= Pakistan national football team results (unofficial matches) =

This is a list of the Pakistan national football team results from 1950 to the present day that, for various reasons, are not accorded the status of official International A Matches.

Key
Win
Draw
Defeat

== 1950s ==
=== 1950 ===
30 October 1950 Friendly	Taj (Iran)	6–1	Pakistan	Tehran, Iran
				Stadium: Amjadieh Stadium

3 November 1950 Friendly	Isfahan XI (Iran)	2–2	Pakistan	Isfahan, Iran

6 November 1950 Friendly	Al-Haras Al-Malaki (Iraq)	1–1	Pakistan	Baghdad, Iraq
	Faraj 38'	Report	Unknown	Stadium: Al-Kashafa Stadium; Attendance: 7,000

=== 1952 ===
25 March 1952 Friendly	Pakistan	11–1	(Dominion of Ceylon) Badulla XI	Ceylon
	Jamil 5'; Ghani 15', 38' (~60); Shafi; Sharif; Fakhri	Report	Fernando (pen.)	Referee: Mr. Hugh Lisk

=== 1954 ===
15 April 1954 Friendly	Pakistan	9–0	(Pakistan) Lahore Garrison XI	Lahore, Pakistan
	Jamil; Kutty; Fakhri	Report		Stadium: Government College ground

16 April 1954 Friendly	Pakistan	1–1	(Pakistan) Civilians XI	Lahore, Pakistan
	Fakhri	Report	Kazi	Stadium: Government College ground

24 April 1954 Friendly	Singapore Selection	1–4	Pakistan	Kallang, Singapore
	Kok Peow (?)	Report	Fakhri 6' (?); Jamil 17'; Kutty (?)	Stadium: Jalan Besar Stadium; Attendance: 11,500; Referee: Greg De Silva

10 December 1954 Friendly	Pakistan	N/A	(Pakistan) Olympians Club	Lahore, Pakistan
				Stadium: Iqbal Park

12 December 1954 Friendly	Pakistan	N/A	(Pakistan) Lahore District FA XI	Lahore, Pakistan
				Stadium: Government College Ground

=== 1955 ===
14 December 1955 Friendly	East Pakistan	1–3	Pakistan	Dhaka, East Pakistan
	Chunna 32'		Jamil 15' (?), 70'	Stadium: Dacca Stadium; Referee: Masudur Rahman

=== 1956 ===
24 August 1956 Friendly	Ceylon Football Association XI (Dominion of Ceylon)	4–6	Pakistan	Colombo, Ceylon
		Report

28 August 1956 Friendly	CFA President's Barefooted XI (Dominion of Ceylon)	1–6	Pakistan	Colombo, Ceylon
	Soono (pen.)		Chowdhury; Moosa; Amin	Stadium: Government Services Ground

30 August 1956 Friendly	Eastern Province XI (Dominion of Ceylon)	1–2	Pakistan	Trincomalee, Ceylon
				Stadium: Rifle Green

5 September 1956 Friendly	Indo Malayan XI (Singapore)	1–6	Pakistan	Kallang, Singapore
	Awang Bakar 43'	Report	Hanif 27', 63'; Umer 31', 58', 84'; Amin (?)	Stadium: Jalan Besar Stadium; Attendance: 3,112

8 September 1956 Friendly	Sino Malayan XI (Singapore)	2–2	Pakistan	Kallang, Singapore
	Johan Hassan (?); Dollah Zainol (?)	Report	Umer 35'; Talib 60'	Stadium: Jalan Besar Stadium

12 September 1956 Friendly	Singapore Selection	1–1	Pakistan	Kallang, Singapore
	John O'Neill 54'	Report	Talib 14'	Stadium: Jalan Besar Stadium; Attendance: 6,400; Referee: P/Lt. Meadows

19 September 1956 Friendly	Guangzhou XI (China)	1–1	Pakistan	Guangzhou, China
	Zhang Wenlu 40'	Report	Hanif 62'	Stadium: Yuexiushan Stadium; Attendance: 50,000; Referee: Zeng Peifu (China)

24 September 1956 Friendly	Shanghai XI (China)	2–2	Pakistan	Shanghai, China
	Chen Longquan 4'; Ma Jinsheng 48'	Report	Moosa 42'; Amin 88'	Stadium: Jiangwan Stadium; Attendance: 40,000

28 September 1956 Friendly	August 1st (China)	1–0	Pakistan	Beijing, China
	Chen Keliang 12'	Report		Stadium: Xiannongtan Stadium; Attendance: 20,000

30 September 1956 Friendly	Beijing Youth (China)	5–0	Pakistan	Beijing, China
	Shi Wanchun 5' (pen.), 14'; Fang Renqiu 66'; Zhang Honggen 82'; Sun Fucheng 86'	Report		Stadium: Xiannongtan Stadium; Attendance: 20,000

=== 1958 ===
28 April 1958 Friendly	Pakistan	5–0	(Pakistan) Army XI	Lahore, Pakistan
		Report

29 April 1958 Friendly	Pakistan	4–0	(Pakistan) Olympians Club	Lahore, Pakistan
	Kabir; Ashraf; Moosa			Stadium: Iqbal Park

30 April 1958 Friendly	Pakistan	5–1	(Pakistan) Combined XI	Lahore, Pakistan
		Report		Stadium: Iqbal Park

1 May 1958 Friendly	Pakistan	3–1	(Pakistan) Combined XI	Lahore, Pakistan
	Umer; Kabir (pen.)	Report	Chowdhury	Stadium: Iqbal Park

13 May 1958 Friendly	Sino-Malayan XI (Federation of Malaya)	2–7	Pakistan	Kuala Lumpur, Malaya
	Kong Leong 49'; Ghani (?)	Report	Chowdhury (?); Umer (?), 47' (?); Ibrahim (?); Kabir (?)	Stadium: Stadium Merdeka; Referee: T. Nadarajah (Malaya)

18 May 1958 Friendly	Singapore Selection	1–0	Pakistan	Kallang, Singapore
	Roy Davey 72'	Report		Stadium: Jalan Besar Stadium; Referee: Lee Pak Tong (Singapore)

=== 1959 ===
18 April 1959 Friendly	East Pakistan	0–7	Pakistan	Dacca, East Pakistan
			Ibrahim; Kabir; Umer; Moosa	Stadium: Dacca Stadium

20 April 1959 Friendly	Chittagong XI (Pakistan)	2–3	Pakistan	Chittagong, East Pakistan
	Raymond 32'; Islam 85'		Umer 15'; Jehan 57'; Abdullah 70'	Stadium: Niaz Stadium; Attendance: 50,000; Referee: Mr. Islam (Pakistan)

30 April 1959 Friendly	Mandalay XI (Myanmar)	N/A	Pakistan	Mandalay, Burma

2 May 1959 Friendly	Mandalay XI (Myanmar)	N/A	Pakistan	Mandalay, Burma

3 May 1959 Friendly	Mandalay XI (Myanmar)	N/A	Pakistan	Mandalay, Burma

8 May 1959 Friendly	Chittagong District Sports Association XI (Pakistan)	1–10	Pakistan	Chittagong, East Pakistan
	Shanker		Moosa; Umer; Ibrahim; Jehan; Saif	Stadium: Niaz Stadium; Referee: Mohammad Islam (Pakistan)

9 May 1959 Friendly	Eastern Bengal Railway (Pakistan)	1–9	Pakistan	Chittagong, East Pakistan
	Shanker		Abdullah; Saif; Jehan	Stadium: Niaz Stadium

10 May 1959 Friendly	Chittagong Mohammedan (Pakistan)	1–12	Pakistan	Chittagong, East Pakistan
	Delwar		Qayyum; Yousuf Sr. Ismail; Abdullah; Saif	Stadium: Niaz Stadium

13 May 1959 Friendly	Dacca City XI (Pakistan)	1–4	Pakistan	Dacca, East Pakistan
	Nuruzzaman 7'		Yousuf Sr. 15'; Qayyum 50', 64'; Abdullah 68'	Referee: Gholam Husain (Pakistan)

14 May 1959 Friendly	East Pakistan	1–2	Pakistan	Dacca, East Pakistan
	Shanker 56'		Yousuf Sr. 10', 16'	Referee: Isa Khan (Pakistan)

May 1958 Friendly	Pakistan	6–3	(Pakistan) Mymensingh XI	Dacca, East Pakistan
	Saif 7', 13'; Qayyum; Kabir		Misbah; Nabi ? (?)	Referee: Amir Ali

16 May 1959 Friendly	Mymensingh XI (Pakistan)	0–3	Pakistan	Mymensingh, East Pakistan
			Abdullah; Saif	Stadium: Circuit House Ground; Referee: Prof. Akhtar Hosain (Pakistan)

18 May 1959 Friendly	North Bengal XI (Pakistan)	0–9	Pakistan	Pabna, East Pakistan
				Stadium: Pabna Jinnah Park Ground

== 1960s ==
=== 1960 ===
August 1960	Pakistan	2–3	(Indonesia) Jakarta XI	Indonesia
		Report

August 1960	Pakistan	0–3	(Indonesia) Surabaya XI	Indonesia
		Report

10 August 1960 1960 Merdeka Tournament G.S.	Pakistan	3–1	Japan B	Kuala Lumpur, Federation of Malaya
	Moosa 46'; Sugiyama 70' (o.g.); Jehan 75'	Report	Miyamoto 11'	Stadium: Stadium Merdeka; Referee: Mak Yeung Fai (Hong Kong)

=== 1962 ===
9 July 1962 Friendly	Pakistan	7–2	(Pakistan) Rawalpindi Commissioners XI	Rawalpindi, Pakistan
	Hashim; Jehan; Abul Khair; Majeed	Report	Aslam Jr.; Jahangir	Stadium: Army Stadium

26 August 1962 Friendly	East Pakistan	1–4	Pakistan	Dacca, East Pakistan
	Irshad (o.g.)	Report	Jehan	Stadium: Dacca Stadium, Dacca

2 September 1962 Friendly	East Pakistan	2–4	Pakistan	Dacca, East Pakistan
	Abbas 13', 86' (pen.)	Report	Abdullah 5'; Umer 70'; Abid 75'; Jehan 79'	Stadium: Dacca Stadium, Dacca; Referee: M. A. Hamza

21 September 1962 Friendly	FA Malaya XI (Malaysia)	3–2	Pakistan	Alor Setar, Malaya
	Ahmad Nordin 22' (pen.); Lim Ban Chang 41'; Abu Hassan 60'	Report	Yaqub 15'; Moosa 30'	Stadium: Darul Aman Stadium

23 September 1962 Friendly	FA Malaya XI (Malaysia)	1–4	Pakistan	Penang, Malaya
	Unknown	Report	Moosa; Abdullah; Ghafoor	Stadium: City Stadium

=== 1963 ===
24 September 1963 Friendly	Pakistan	9–0	(Pakistan) Kalat XI	Mastung, Pakistan
		Report		Stadium: Mastung Stadium

=== 1964 ===
29 September 1964 Friendly	August 1st (China)	2–0	Pakistan	Beijing, China
	Zhao Jingrong 5', 89'	Report		Stadium: Workers' Stadium

7 October 1964 Friendly	Shenyang XI (China)	2–0	Pakistan	Shenyang, China
	Na Xijun 35' (pen.); Mahmood 50' (o.g.)	Report		Stadium: People's Stadium; Attendance: 20,000

11 October 1964 Friendly	Shanghai XI (China)	3–3	Pakistan	Shanghai, China
	Li Wenlong 10'; Gao Jianyun 20'; Zhao Guanghua 79'	Report	Yousuf Sr. 21'; Muhammad Hashim 34'; Ghafoor 83'	Stadium: Jiangwan Stadium; Attendance: 50,000

15 October 1964 Friendly	Hebei Youth (China)	1–0	Pakistan	Shanghai, China
	Wan Liancheng 10'	Report		Stadium: Jiangwan Stadium; Attendance: 25,000

26 November 1964 Friendly	Pakistan	0–4	(Soviet Union) Neftyanik Baku	Dacca, East Pakistan
		Report	Kuznetsov 12'; Tuaev 20'; Markarov 60'; Banishevskiy 75'	Stadium: Dacca Stadium; Referee: Masudur Rahman

2 December 1964 Friendly	Pakistan	1–3	(Soviet Union) Neftyanik Baku	Lahore, Pakistan
		Report		Stadium: Lahore Stadium

6 December 1964 Friendly	Pakistan	0–10	(Soviet Union) Neftyanik Baku	Karachi, Pakistan
		Report	Markarov; Ruslan Abdullayev; Nadir Eynullayev; Trofimov; Tuaev; Valeriy Gadzhiyev	Stadium: National Stadium; Attendance: 15,000; Referee: Bahadur Khan (Pakistan)

=== 1965 ===
2 March 1965 Friendly	Kurunegala XI (Dominion of Ceylon)	2–4	Pakistan	Ceylon
		Report

4 March 1965 Friendly	Nuwara Eliya XI (Dominion of Ceylon)	1–5	Pakistan	Ceylon
		Report

5 March 1965 Friendly	Up-Country XI (Dominion of Ceylon)	1–7	Pakistan	Ceylon
		Report

9 March 1965 Friendly	Rathnapura District (Dominion of Ceylon)	1–3	Pakistan	Ceylon
		Report

11 March 1965 Friendly	Colombo XI (Dominion of Ceylon)	1–7	Pakistan	Ceylon
	Sirisena (pen.)	Report	Umer 2' (?); Ghafoor (?); Faqir 15' (?); Ahmed Ali (?); Abdullah (?)	Stadium: Sugathadasa Stadium, Colombo; Attendance: 15,000

=== 1966 ===
21 November 1966 Friendly	Pakistan	1–3	(Soviet Union) FC Alga	Karachi, Pakistan
	Umer 50'		Rivgat Bibaev 18'; Gennadiy Merzlikin 46'; Lyebedev 90'	Stadium: Hockey Club of Pakistan; Attendance: 15,000; Referee: Bahadur Khan (Pakistan)

22 November 1966 Friendly	Pakistan	2–0	(Pakistan) PIA FC	Karachi, Pakistan
	Dar; Taqi	Report		Stadium: KMC Stadium

27 November 1966 Friendly	Pakistan	0–2	(Soviet Union) FC Alga	Lahore, Pakistan
		Report	Shubin 40', 60'	Referee: Mr. Umard

3 December 1966 Friendly	Pakistan	2–7	(Soviet Union) FC Alga	Dacca, East Pakistan
	Moosa 44' Hashim	Report	Boris Streltsov 37'; Gennadiy Merzlikin 42' (?); Shubin 68'; Vyacheslav Fomin 82'	Stadium: Dacca Stadium; Referee: Masudur Rahman

=== 1967 ===
12 March 1967 Friendly	Pakistan	6–2	(Pakistan) Peshawar DFA XI	Peshawar, Pakistan
	Muhammad Hashim; Abdullah; Bakhsh; Hafiz Uddin	Report	Ghafoor	Stadium: Shahi Bagh Ground

14 March 1967 Friendly	Pakistan	N/A	(Pakistan) Gujranwala XI	Gujranwala, Pakistan

15 March 1967 Friendly	Pakistan	N/A	(Pakistan) Sargodha XI	Lyallpur, Pakistan

27 October 1967 Friendly	Pakistan	0–2	(United States) Dallas Tornado	Karachi, Pakistan
		Report	Younus 44' (o.g.); Chris Bachofner (?)	Stadium: Hockey Club; Attendance: 35,000

29 October 1967 Friendly	Pakistan	4–1	(United States) Dallas Tornado	Lahore, Pakistan
	Bakhsh 32', 53'; Dar 34'; Nawaz 79'	Report	Moorcroft 37' (pen.)	Stadium: Lahore Stadium; Attendance: 25,000; Referee: Fazal Akbar Beg

31 October 1967 Friendly	Pakistan	5–2	(United States) Dallas Tornado	Dacca, East Pakistan
	Aslam 16'; Turab 21'; Jabbar 22', 70'; Akbar 75'	Report	Stofells 32', 34'	Stadium: Dacca Stadium; Referee: Mr.Issa Khan

1 November 1967 Friendly	Pakistan	0–0	(United States) Dallas Tornado	Chittagong, East Pakistan
		Report		Stadium: Niaz Stadium; Referee: Md. Islam

8 November 1967 Friendly	Pakistan	3–1	(Pakistan) KMC	Karachi, Pakistan
	Jabbar 16'; Hafiz Uddin (?); Aslam 59'	Report	Ahmed Ali 24'	Stadium: KMC Stadium

=== 1968 ===
19 March 1968 Friendly	Pakistan	1–6	(Soviet Union) FC Kairat	Karachi, Pakistan
	Bakhsh 34'	Report	Segizbayev 40' 45'; Kvochkin; Viktor Abgolts 9'; Aleksandr Zhuykov	Stadium: KMC Football Stadium; Referee: Nabi Bakhsh (Pakistan)

22 March 1968 Friendly	Pakistan	0–3	(Soviet Union) FC Kairat	Multan, Pakistan
		Report	Adlet Kashaganov; Vladimir Kislyakov; Yuriy Musin	Stadium: Ibn-e-Qasim Bagh Stadium

25 March 1968 Friendly	Pakistan	0–4	(Soviet Union) FC Kairat	Dacca, East Pakistan
		Report	Vladimir Asylbaev 26'; Segizbayev 48'; Adlet Kashaganov 56'; Viktor Abgolts	Stadium: Dacca Stadium; Referee: Sheikh Shaheb Ali (Pakistan)

27 March 1968 Friendly	Pakistan	0–2	(Soviet Union) FC Kairat	Rajshahi, Pakistan
		Report	Viktor Abgolts 45'; Dolmatov 80'	Stadium: Rajshahi Stadium; Attendance: 40,000; Referee: Zahurul Alam (Pakistan)

=== 1969 ===
23 February 1969 Friendly	Pakistan	0–1	(Soviet Union) CSKA Moscow	Jessore, East Pakistan
			? (~80)

25 February 1969 Friendly	Pakistan	1–3	(Soviet Union) CSKA Moscow	Dacca, East Pakistan
	Hafiz Uddin 41'	Report	Boris Kopeykin 28'; Siguot 34'	Stadium: Dacca Stadium; Referee: Issa khan

28 February 1969 Friendly	Pakistan	1–3	(Soviet Union) CSKA Moscow	Karachi, Pakistan
	Jabbar	Report	Vladimir Polikarpov 13'; Anatoliy Maslyaev; Fedotov	Stadium: KMC Football Stadium; Attendance: 10,000; Referee: Bahadur Khan (Pakistan)

6 March 1969 1969 Friendship Cup	Mersin İdman Yurdu (Turkey)	4–1	Pakistan	Tehran, Iran
	Olcay Başarır 6'; Arpacıoğlu 20' (pen.); Aytaç 75'; Ayhan Öz 79'	Report	Hafiz Uddin 86'	Stadium: Amjadieh Stadium; Attendance: 5,000; Referee: Sobhi Adib (Iraq)

8 March 1969 1969 Friendship Cup	Spartak Moscow (Soviet Union)	5–0	Pakistan	Tehran, Iran
	Logofet 15' (pen.); Olshansky 38', 64'; Proskurin 43', 68'	Report		Stadium: Amjadieh Stadium; Attendance: 10,000; Referee: Abolghasem Haj Abolhassan (Iran)

May 1969 Friendly	Pakistan	6–0	(Pakistan) Rawalpindi District	Pakistan
	Jabbar; Nawaz; Maula; Allah Bakhsh	Report

22 May 1969 Friendly	Stroitel Ashgabat (Soviet Union)	2–0	Pakistan	Ashgabat, Soviet Union
	Nikolayev; Hrupunev	Report

25 May 1969 Friendly	Zarafshan XI (Soviet Union)	3–2	Pakistan	Bukhara, Soviet Union
	Kozin 19'; Chuvilin 25'; Nigmidzyanov 44'	Report	Aslam 9'; Bakhsh 11'	Stadium: City Stadium

28 May 1969 Friendly	Neftyanik Fergana (Soviet Union)	2–3	Pakistan	Fergana, Soviet Union
	Yuri Kakhanovsky 30'; Valery Katelin 75'	Report	Bakhsh 7', 65'; Dar 67'	Stadium: Spartak Stadium

16 September 1969 Friendly	Boluspor (Turkey)	1–3	Pakistan	Bolu, Turkey
	Rıdvan Ertan or János Kuszmann (?)	Report	Bakhsh 27'; Haji Ilyas (?); Dar (?)	Stadium: Bolu Sports Stadium

20 September 1969 Friendly	Konyaspor (Turkey)	0–0	Pakistan	Konya, Turkey
		Report		Stadium: Konya City Sports Stadium

23 September 1969 Friendly	Jawanan e Tehran (Iran)	8–0	Pakistan	Tehran, Iran
	Parviz Mirza Hasan 15', 39', 51', 87'; Behzadi 36', 76'; Jabbari 66'; Babakhanloo 84'	Report		Stadium: Amjadieh Stadium; Attendance: 10,000; Referee: Davoud Nasiri (Iran)

26 September 1969 Friendly	Taj (Iran)	3–1	Pakistan	Tehran, Iran
	Jabbari 11' Monshizadeh 17' Mostafavi 82'	Report	Haji Ilyas 14'	Stadium: Amjadieh Stadium; Attendance: 1,000; Referee: Afzal Khan (Pakistan)

28 September 1969 Friendly	Persepolis (Iran)	2–0	Pakistan	Tehran, Iran
	Masihnia 24'; Khordbin 57'	Report		Stadium: Amjadieh Stadium; Attendance: 3,000; Referee: Afzal Khan (Pakistan)

== 1970s ==
=== 1970 ===
12 March 1970 1970 Friendship Cup	Paykan (Iran)	3–1	Pakistan	Tehran, Iran
	Kalani 2', 54'; Asghar Adibi 15'	Report	Allah Bakhsh 27'	Stadium: Amjadieh Stadium; Attendance: 10,000; Referee: Almásy (Hungary)

14 March 1970 1970 Friendship Cup	Ankara Demirspor (Turkey)	1–1	Pakistan	Tehran, Iran
	Aydoğan Aygan 1'	Report	Arshad 84'	Stadium: Amjadieh Stadium; Attendance: 5,000; Referee: Almásy (Hungary)

9 September 1970 1970 RCD Cup	Turkey Amateurs	3–1	Pakistan	Tehran, Iran
	Mustafa Türel 13'; Aldoğan Argon 34'; Cevher Özer 53'	Report	Dar 20'	Stadium: Amjadiyeh Stadium; Referee: Ali Daneifard (Iran)

September 1970 Friendly	Bandar-e Pahlavi (Iran)	2–4	Pakistan	Tehran, Iran
		Report

=== 1973 ===
13 June 1973 Friendly	China Youth	1–1	Pakistan	Beijing, China
		Report		Stadium: Xiannongtan Stadium

16 June 1973 Friendly	Shanghai XI (China)	2–0	Pakistan	Shanghai, China
		Report		Stadium: Hongkou Stadium; Attendance: 30,000

20 June 1973 Friendly	Guangdong XI (China)	4–3	Pakistan	Guangzhou, China
		Report	Sarwar (?), 52'; Ewaz Ali (?)	Stadium: Yuexiushan Stadium; Attendance: 30,000

23 June 1973 Friendly	Tung Sing–Happy Valley Combined XI (Hong Kong)	1–3	Pakistan	Kowloon, British Hong Kong
	Cheung Chi Doy	Report; Report		Stadium: Police Ground; Attendance: 10,000

=== 1974 ===
17 January 1974 1974 RCD Cup	Malavan (Iran)	2–1	Pakistan	Karachi, Pakistan
	Jahani 28'; Espandar 73'	Report	Idrees 19'	Stadium: Hockey Stadium; Attendance: 5,000; Referee: Ziya Türkdogan (Turkey)

=== 1976 ===
17 July 1976 Afghanistan Republic Day Festival Cup	Pakistan	1–2	(Iran) Aboumoslem Mashhad	Kabul, Afghanistan
	Idrees (?)	Report	Mohsen Bemani 6'; Abolfazl Safavi 8'	Stadium: Ghazi Stadium

23 July 1976 Afghanistan Republic Day Festival Cup	Pakistan	0–2	(Soviet Union) CSKA Pamir	Kabul, Afghanistan
		Report		Stadium: Ghazi Stadium

24 July 1976 Afghanistan Republic Day Festival Cup	Pakistan	1–0	Afghanistan B	Kabul, Afghanistan
		Report		Stadium: Ghazi Stadium

13 October 1976 1976 Quaid-e-Azam International Tournament	Guangdong (China)	5–1	Pakistan Greens	Karachi, Pakistan
	Cai Jinbiao 2'; Chen Weihao 6'; Rong Zhixing (?); Ou Weiting (?)	Report	Sarwar (?)	Stadium: Hockey Club; Attendance: 8,000; Referee: (Afghanistan) Majang Sultan

16 October 1976 1976 Quaid-e-Azam International Tournament	Pakistan Greens	3–2	Pakistan Reds	Karachi, Pakistan
	Kazim Ali (?); Sarwar (?)	Report	Muhammad Saleem (?); Zahoor (?)	Stadium: Hockey Club

=== 1978 ===
7 May 1978 1978 Saudi Arabia Football Federation International Tournament	South Korea B	5–0	Pakistan	Riyadh, Saudi Arabia
		Report

== 1980s ==
=== 1981 ===
3 November 1981 Friendly	Aung San Selected (Myanmar)	1–0	Pakistan	Rangoon, Burma
	Soe Moe Kyaw 43'	Report		Stadium: Aung San Stadium; Referee: U. Kyaw Zaw (Burma)

9 November 1981 1981 King's Cup	PSIS Semarang U-23 (Indonesia)	0–0	Pakistan	Bangkok, Thailand
		RSSSF		Stadium: National Stadium; Referee: R Balasubramaniam (India)

15 November 1981 1981 King's Cup	August 1st (China)	1–0	Pakistan	Bangkok, Thailand
		Report		Stadium: National Stadium

=== 1982 ===
20 February 1982 1982 Quaid-e-Azam International Tournament	Pakistan Greens	1–4	(China) Shandong	Karachi, Pakistan
	Wahid 26'	Report	Zou Xinguang 8'; Zhang Luodi (?); Wang Dezhang 80'; Qu Gang 84'	Stadium: National Stadium

23 February 1982 1982 Quaid-e-Azam International Tournament	Pakistan Blues	0–0	Pakistan Greens	Karachi, Pakistan
		Report		Stadium: National Stadium; Referee: (Iran) Behman Bahadur

23 August 1982 1982 Bangladesh President's Gold Cup	Beijing (China)	4–0	Pakistan	Dhaka, Bangladesh
	Jang Di Ping 17'; Ji Jing Lian 18'; Luki Yang Bin 40'; Yang Chaohui 53'	Report		Stadium: Dhaka Stadium

25 August 1982 1982 Bangladesh President's Gold Cup	Harimau Malaysia	4–1	Pakistan	Dhaka, Bangladesh
	Nuruddin Osman 4', 35'; Nasir Yusuf 22'; Hasimuddin 36'	Report	Zulfiqar 84'	Stadium: Dhaka Stadium

27 August 1982 1982 Bangladesh President's Gold Cup	Bangladesh Greens	2–1 (Note: RSSSF misreported the scoreline as 2–0)	Pakistan	Dhaka, Bangladesh
	Badal 57'; Jahangir 59'	Report	Sarwar 39'	Stadium: Dhaka Stadium

=== 1983 ===
3 January 1983 Friendly	Pakistan	0–3	(West Germany) Southwest German FA	Rawalpindi, Pakistan
			Mukhtar (?); Unknown (?); Unknown (?)	Stadium: Army Stadium

8 January 1983 Friendly	Pakistan	0–2	(West Germany) Southwest German FA	Karachi, Pakistan
				Stadium: KMC Stadium

=== 1984 ===
21 August 1984 1984 Merdeka Tournament G.S	Harimau Malaysia	2–0	Pakistan	Kuala Lumpur, Malaysia
	Keegan 44', 89'	Report

23 August 1984 1984 Merdeka Tournament G.S	South Korea U20	6–1	Pakistan	Kuala Lumpur, Malaysia
	Jin-han (?); Yon-ho (?); Kyung-Nam (?)	Report	Sharafat 68'

26 August 1984 1984 Merdeka Tournament G.S	China B	6–1	Pakistan	Kuala Lumpur, Malaysia
	Lin 2'; Qunli 5', 18', 22'; Chunben 20'; Kexing 42'	Report	Butt 21'	Stadium: Perak Stadium

30 August 1984 1984 Merdeka Tournament G.S	Primera B XI (Argentina)	2–1	Pakistan	Kuala Lumpur, Malaysia
	Rojas 62'; Callipo 89'	Report	Sharafat 83'	Stadium: Perak Stadium

3 September 1984 1984 Merdeka Tournament G.S	Algeria U20	0–2	Pakistan	Kuala Lumpur, Malaysia
		Report	Sharafat 39', 69'	Stadium: Perak Stadium

=== 1985 ===
28 April 1985 1985 Quaid-e-Azam International Tournament	Pakistan	0–0	North Korea XI	Peshawar, Pakistan
		Report		Stadium: Qayyum Stadium

3 May 1985 1985 Quaid-e-Azam International Tournament	Pakistan	1–3	Indonesia Youth	Peshawar, Pakistan
		RSSSF		Stadium: Qayyum Stadium

=== 1986 ===
14 February 1986 1986 Fajr International Tournament	Poland U21	3–0	Pakistan	Tehran, Iran
	Kaczmarek 11'; Lesinak 60'; Sikorski 88'			Stadium: Azadi Stadium, Tehran; Attendance: 30000; Referee: Hamid Khoshkhan (Tehran FA)

18 February 1986 1986 Fajr International Tournament	Al-Fotuwa SC (Syria)	1–0	Pakistan	Tehran, Iran
	Kharabah 32'			Stadium: Azadi Stadium, Tehran; Attendance: 25000; Referee: Mohammad Reza Emami (IRAN)

March 1986 1986 President's Gold Cup International Tournament	Pakistan	1–1	(Iran) Mazandaran Province	Karachi, Pakistan
		Report		Stadium: National Stadium

11 March 1986 1986 President's Gold Cup International Tournament	Pakistan	1–0	(China) Shenyang Army Unit	Karachi, Pakistan
	Fida 40'	Report		Stadium: National Stadium

12 March 1986 1986 President's Gold Cup International Tournament	Pakistan	1–1	(Pakistan) President XI	Karachi, Pakistan
	Agha 89'	Report		Stadium: National Stadium

14 March 1986 1986 President's Gold Cup International Tournament	Pakistan	0–0	Pakistan Customs	Karachi, Pakistan
		Report		Stadium: National Stadium

26 April 1986 1986 Quaid-e-Azam International Tournament	Pakistan Greens	1–0	South Korea Works Selection	Islamabad, Pakistan
	Sarwar (?)	Report		Stadium: Jinnah Sports Stadium

30 April 1986 1986 Quaid-e-Azam International Tournament	Pakistan Greens	7–0	Pakistan Whites	Islamabad, Pakistan
		Report		Stadium: Jinnah Sports Stadium

=== 1987 ===
16 September 1987 1987 Quaid-e-Azam International Tournament	Pakistan Greens	1–2	(China) Guangzhou	Lahore, Pakistan
	Wahid 31'	Report	Ma Jiangqiang 24'; Wu Qunli 43'	Stadium: Railway Stadium

19 September 1987 1987 Quaid-e-Azam International Tournament	Pakistan Greens	4–0	Pakistan Yellows	Lahore, Pakistan
	Sharafat 10', 16'; Ijaz 20' (?)	Report		Stadium: Railway Stadium

21 September 1987 1987 Quaid-e-Azam International Tournament	Pakistan Greens	4–0	(Maldives) Victory Sports Club	Lahore, Pakistan
	Sharafat 2', 28'; Ijaz 19'; Saleem Patni 24'	Report		Stadium: Railway Stadium

22 September 1987 1987 Quaid-e-Azam International Tournament	Pakistan Greens	0–1	Pakistan Whites	Lahore, Pakistan
		Report	Sarwar 47' (pen.)	Stadium: Railway Stadium

== 1990s ==
=== 1993 ===
20 July 1993 1993 SAARC Gold Cup	Pakistan Whites	0–2	Pakistan	Lahore, Pakistan
		(Report)	Adeel Sarfraz Butt 7'; Ashfaq 30'	Stadium: Railway Stadium

== 2000s ==
=== 2000 ===
2000 Friendly	Pakistan	3–0	(Pakistan) Saudi Arabia Embassy Selection	Pakistan
		Report

2000 Friendly	Pakistan	8–0	(Pakistan) Afghan Selection	Pakistan
		Report

2000 Friendly	Pakistan	7–0	(Pakistan) Afghan/Iranian Selection	Pakistan
		Report

2000 Friendly	Pakistan	2–0	(Pakistan) Huma FC	Pakistan
		Report

13 December 2000 Friendly	Pakistan	4–0	(Pakistan) Europeans Expat Selection	Islamabad, Pakistan
	Zaman (?); Ghulam Ali (?)	Report		Stadium: Jinnah Sports Stadium

=== 2001 ===
2 March 2001 Friendly	Pakistan	2–4	(Pakistan) Army	Islamabad, Pakistan
	Essa (?); Sarfraz (?)	Report	Sanaullah (?); Shaukat (?); Jaffar Hussain (?)	Stadium: Jinnah Sports Stadium

21 March 2001 Friendly	Pakistan	0–3	(England) Bury	Bury, England
		Report	Conell 44'; Bhutia 60'; Preece 90'	Stadium: Gigg Lane

25 March 2001 Friendly	Pakistan	0–2	(England) Coventry	Coventry, England
		Report	Thomspon (?); Aloisi (?)	Stadium: Highfield Road

=== 2002 ===
11 March 2002 Friendly	Pakistan	1–1	(South Korea) Ulsan HD FC	Karachi, Pakistan
		Report		Stadium: People's Football Stadium

13 March 2002 Friendly	Pakistan	1–0	(South Korea) Ulsan HD FC	Karachi, Pakistan
		Report		Stadium: People's Football Stadium

21 March 2002 Friendly	Sri Lanka U20	1–0	Pakistan	Kandy, Sri Lanka
	R.K. Leonard 43'	Report		Stadium: Bogambara Stadium

=== 2003 ===
11 March 2003 Friendly	Pakistan	6–0	(Pakistan) HESCO WAPDA	Karachi, Pakistan
		Report		Stadium: Quaid-e-Azam Sports Complex

12 March 2003 Friendly	Pakistan	7–1	(Pakistan) KPT	Karachi, Pakistan
		Report		Stadium: Quaid-e-Azam Sports Complex

13 March 2003 Friendly	Pakistan	12–0	(Pakistan) KESC	Karachi, Pakistan
		Report		Stadium: Quaid-e-Azam Sports Complex

15 March 2003 Friendly	Pakistan	5–0	(Pakistan) Bismillah Sports	Karachi, Pakistan
		Report		Stadium: Quaid-e-Azam Sports Complex

March 2003 Friendly	Pakistan	9–0	(Pakistan) Karachi XI	Karachi, Pakistan
		Report		Stadium: Quaid-e-Azam Sports Complex

March 2003 Friendly	Pakistan	8–0	(Pakistan) Lyari Club	Karachi, Pakistan
		Report		Stadium: Quaid-e-Azam Sports Complex

16 November 2003 Friendly	Pakistan	5–0	(Pakistan) Bismillah Sports	Pakistan
		Report

19 November 2003 Friendly	Pakistan	6–0	(Pakistan) DHA XI	Pakistan
		Report

22 November 2003 Friendly	Pakistan	5–0	(Pakistan) Bismillah Sports	Pakistan
		Report

=== 2005 ===
9 April 2005 2005 Islamic Solidarity Games	Morocco B	2–0	Pakistan	Ta'if, Saudi Arabia
	Miri 48'; Erraki 67'	Report		Stadium: King Fahd Stadium

7 June 2005 Friendly	Pakistan	3–1	(Pakistan) Mohammaden Sporting Club Pishin	Pakistan
		Report

23 November 2005 Friendly	Al-Muharraq (Bahrain)	3–1	Pakistan	Manama, Bahrain
		Report		Stadium: Al Ahli Stadium

26 November 2005 Friendly	Al-Najma (Bahrain)	2–2	Pakistan	Manama, Bahrain
	Rashid Jamal	Report	Zahid Hameed; Abdul Aziz	Stadium: Al Ahli Stadium

29 November 2005 Friendly	Busaiteen (Bahrain)	N/A	Pakistan	Bahrain
		Report

=== 2006 ===
February 2006 Friendly	Al Sahel (Bahrain)	2–1	Pakistan	Manama, Bahrain
		Report

February 2006 Friendly	Al Ahli Club (Bahrain)	N/A	Pakistan	Manama, Bahrain
		Report

February 2006 Friendly	Al-Riffa (Bahrain)	N/A	Pakistan	Riffa, Bahrain
		Report

=== 2009 ===
March 2009 Friendly	Pakistan	3–0	Pakistan Steel	Pakistan
		Report

March 2009 Friendly	Pakistan	4–1	(Pakistan) Habib Bank	Pakistan
		Report

March 2009 Friendly	Pakistan	2–1	(Pakistan) Karachi Port Trust	Pakistan
		Report

March 2009 Friendly	Pakistan	3–0	(Pakistan) Sindh Government Press	Pakistan
		Report

8 March 2009 2009 ANFA Cup	Pakistan	1–1	(Bangladesh) Arambagh KS	Kathmandu, Nepal
	Essa (?)	Report	Moloy Barman 76'	Stadium: Dasharath Rangasala

14 July 2009 Friendly	Thailand U23	2–0	Pakistan	Muang Thong Thani, Thailand
	Kirati Keawsombat 14'; Arthit Sunthornpit 30' (pen.)	Report		Stadium: Thunderdome Stadium; Referee: Atthakorn Wetchakan (Thailand)

July 2009 Friendly	Thailand U19	4–0	Pakistan	Muang Thong Thani, Thailand
		Report		Stadium: Thunderdome Stadium

Thailand used nine substitutes in the international friendly.

18 July 2009 International Friendly	Thailand	4–0	Pakistan	Muang Thong Thani, Thailand
	Dangda 8', 17'; Viwatchaichok 9' (pen.); Winothai 46'	Report		Stadium: Thunderdome Stadium

== 2010s ==
=== 2012 ===
16 November 2012 Friendly	Singapore U23	1–0	Pakistan	Bishan, Singapore
	Izzdin Shafiq 45'	Report		Stadium: Bishan Stadium

=== 2013 ===
11 March 2013 Friendly	UAE Armed Forces (United Arab Emirates)	2–1	Pakistan	Dubai, United Arab Emirates
		Report	Naveed Ahmed

=== 2015 ===
23 February 2015 Friendly	Malaysia U19	1–3	Pakistan	Kuala Lumpur, Malaysia
	Amin 61'		Bashir 46'; Ahmed 65'; Riaz 67'	Stadium: Shah Alam Stadium

26 February 2015 Friendly	Malaysia U22	2–1	Pakistan	Shah Alam, Malaysia
	Naim 8'; Sathasivam 73'		Riaz 90+2'	Stadium: UiTM Stadium

3 March 2015 Friendly	Osotspa FC (Thailand)	2–0	Pakistan	Bangkok, Thailand
	Naim 65'; Sathasivam 75'	Report

5 March 2015 Friendly	Thailand U23	2–0	Pakistan	Nonthaburi, Thailand
19:00 UTC+07:00	Thanakorn 51'; Pakorn 72'	Report		Stadium: SCG Stadium; Referee: Suprem Nonthawong (Thailand)

=== 2018 ===
The international friendly match against Palestine was played behind closed doors at the Grand Hamad Stadium.

16 December 2018 International Friendly	Palestine	2–0	Pakistan	Doha, Qatar
	Dabbagh 24'; Maraaba 29'	Report		Stadium: Grand Hamad Stadium

19 December 2018 Friendly	Qatar Army	3–1	Pakistan	Doha, Qatar
	? (?); ? (?); ? (?)	Report	? (?)	Stadium: Grand Hamad Stadium

25 December 2018 Friendly	Afghanistan U23	1–1	Pakistan	Doha, Qatar
	Sharifi 66'	Report	Bashir (?)	Stadium: Grand Hamad Stadium

=== 2019 ===
28 May 2019 Friendly	Bahrain U23	2–1	Pakistan	Riffa, Bahrain
	? 44'; ? (?)	Report	Faheem 6'	Stadium: Bahrain National Stadium

1 June 2019 Friendly	Buri Sports Club (Bahrain)	1–5	Pakistan	Manama, Bahrain
	? (?)	Report	Tabish (?); Faheem (?); Nabi (?); Rehman (?)

== 2020s ==
=== 2020 ===
22 January 2020 Friendly	UKM (Malaysia)	2–2	Pakistan	Kuala Lumpur, Malaysia
	Asnan Ahmad 22'; Rennie 78'	Report	Kaleemullah 5'; Muhammad Afzaal 55'

23 January 2020 Friendly	Felda United (Malaysia)	0–2	Pakistan	Kuala Lumpur, Malaysia
		Report	Waheed 16'; Nisar Ahmad 75'

=== 2026 ===
1 June 2026 Diamond Jubilee Football Tournament	Pakistan	0–0	Bangladesh Olympic	Malé, Maldives
16:00 UTC+5:30		Report		Stadium: National Football Stadium; Attendance: 1,200; Referee: Javiz Mohamed (Maldives)
