= Pakistan national football B team =

Pakistan B
- Nickname(s): Pakistan Reds (1976); Pakistan Blues (1982); Pakistan Whites (1985–1987; 1993); Pakistan A (1993)
- Association: Pakistan Football Federation
- Confederation: AFC
- Sub-confederation: SAFF (South Asia)

The Pakistan national football B team, also referred to as Pakistan A on some occasions, is a secondary national football team run occasionally in support of the Pakistan national football team. The team has at times played against the senior national teams of other countries.

== History ==
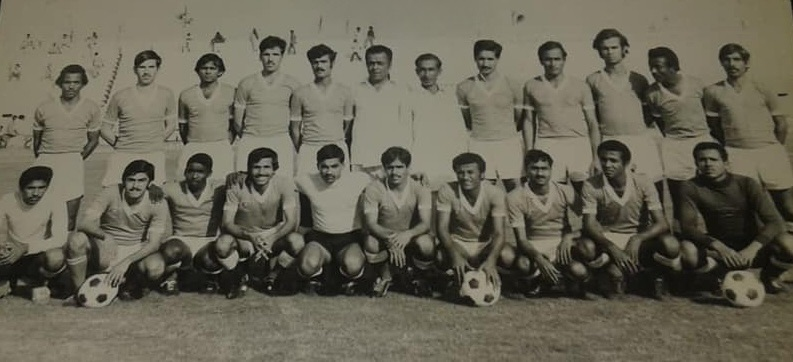
Pakistan Reds at the 1976 Quaid-e-Azam International Tournament

In 1976, the Quaid-e-Azam International Tournament was established in Pakistan to commemorate the centenary of the birth of Muhammad Ali Jinnah, the first leader of Pakistan, in which two Pakistan national teams would participate, the Pakistan national football team under the name of Pakistan Greens, and the national B team under the name of Pakistan Reds, captained by national team player Mujahid Tareen. Although the team was only reserved for exhibition matches, in the next editions, the reserves team formally participated in the tournament under the name of Pakistan Blues in 1982, and Pakistan Whites in 1985, 1986 and 1987.

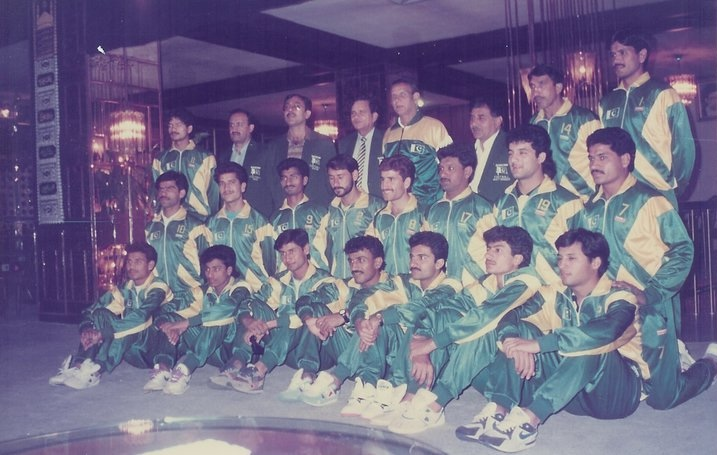
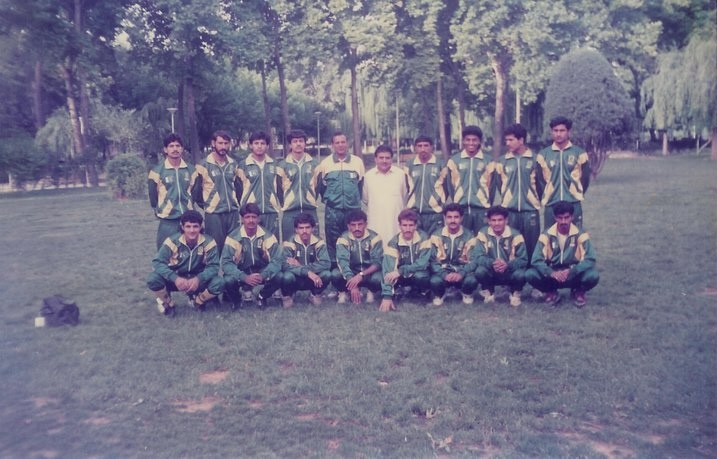
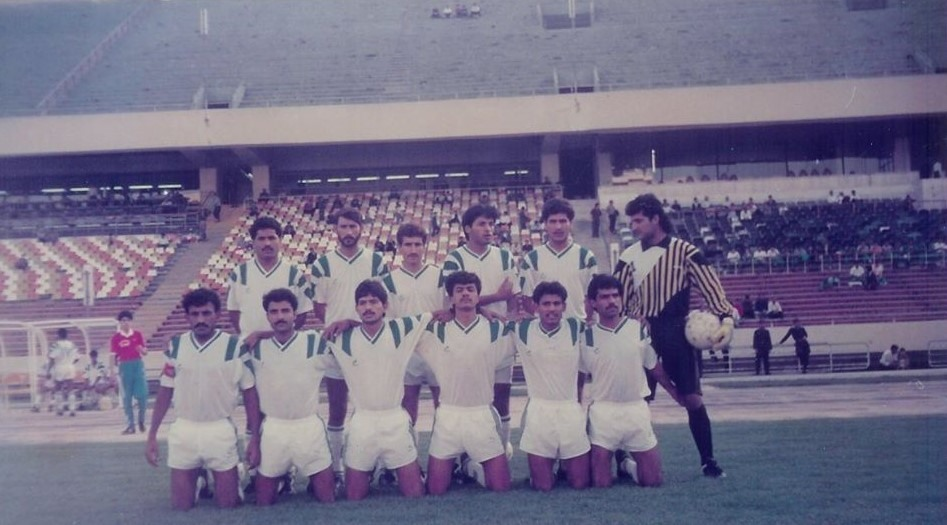
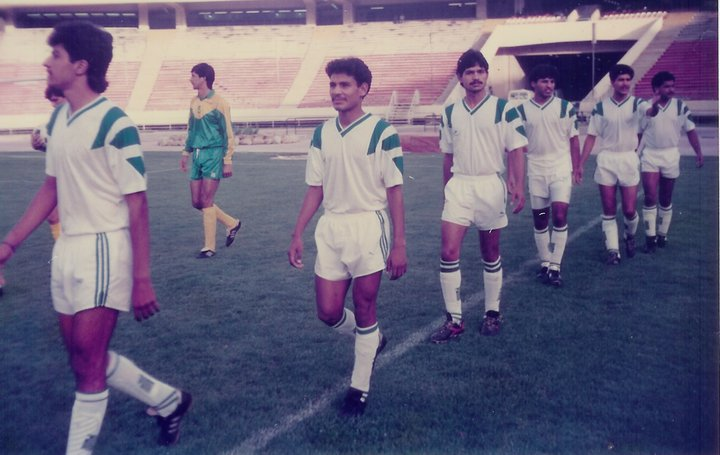
Pakistan during the 1993 ECO Cup

In June 1993, the Pakistan Football Federation sent an alternate team, designated as "Pakistan A", to the 1993 ECO Cup held in Tehran, Iran, while the main national team was participating in the 1994 FIFA World Cup qualifiers. The ECO Cup took place from 6 to 14 June 1993, between two rounds of the group A qualifiers including Pakistan, held from 22 to 30 May (in Jordan) and 12–20 June (in China). The ECO Cup squad was managed by a completely different coaching staff, with former international players Muhammad Latif and Abdul Ghafoor Ajiz at the helm, and captained by forward Lal Muhammad Lalo, while the main national team at the World Cup qualifiers was led by Muhammad Aslam Japani. Few players from that team such as Adeel Sarfraz Butt and Iftikhar Ghani were later selected for the second phase of the qualifiers in China. At the inaugural 1993 SAARC Gold Cup held in Lahore, a second string team named Pakistan Whites also played exhibition matches against the national sides participating in the tournament.

In April 2007, the Pakistan Football Federation fielded a team named Pakistan Football Federation XI at the E. K. Nayanar Memorial Gold Cup in India. Captained by Muhammad Essa and coached by Akhtar Mohiuddin, the side was used to assess players ahead of Pakistan's forthcoming international competitions. The side has also been referred to as Pakistan A.

== Coach history ==
- (Pakistan) Unknown (1976 Quaid-e-Azam International Tournament)
- (Pakistan) Murad Bakhsh (1982 Quaid-e-Azam International Tournament)
- (Pakistan) Unknown (1985 Quaid-e-Azam International Tournament)
- (Pakistan) Muhammad Idrees (1986 Quaid-e-Azam International Tournament)
- (Pakistan) Muhammad Latif (1993 ECO Cup)
- (Pakistan) Akhtar Mohiuddin (E. K. Nayanar Memorial Gold Cup)

== Captains ==
- (Pakistan) Mujahid Tareen (1976 Quaid-e-Azam International Tournament)
- (Pakistan) Mahmood Ahmed (1982 Quaid-e-Azam International Tournament)
- (Pakistan) Zulfiqar Hussain Dogar (1986 Quaid-e-Azam International Tournament)
- (Pakistan) Ghulam Sarwar Teddy (1987 Quaid-e-Azam International Tournament)
- (Pakistan) Lal Muhammad Lalo (1993 ECO Cup)
- (Pakistan) Muhammad Essa (E. K. Nayanar Memorial Gold Cup)

== Results and fixtures ==
=== 1976 ===
16 October 1976 1976 Quaid-e-Azam International Tournament	Pakistan Greens	3–2	Pakistan Reds	Karachi, Pakistan
	Kazim (?); Sarwar (?)	Report	Saleem (?); Zahoor (?)	Stadium: Hockey Club

18 October 1976 1976 Quaid-e-Azam International Tournament	Guangdong (China)	8–2	Pakistan Reds	Karachi, Pakistan
	Chen Xirong (?); Ta Jieqiu (?); Wei Chongjin (?)	Report	Salah Mohammad (?); Mujahid (?)	Stadium: Hockey Club

=== 1982 ===
13 February 1982 1982 Quaid-e-Azam International Tournament	Pakistan Blues	2–1	Oman	Karachi, Pakistan
	Anwar (?)	Report	Nasser Hamdan (?)	Stadium: National Stadium; Referee: (Nepal) Shrestha

14 February 1982 1982 Quaid-e-Azam International Tournament	Pakistan Blues	1–1	Nepal	Karachi, Pakistan
	Shahid Ahmad (?)	Report	Rupak Raj Sharma 90' (pen.)	Stadium: National Stadium; Referee: (Iran) Behman Bahadur

15 February 1982 1982 Quaid-e-Azam International Tournament	Pakistan Blues	2–1	Bangladesh	Karachi, Pakistan
	Zulfiqar 59'; Anwar 73'	Report	Murshedy 46'	Stadium: National Stadium; Referee: (Nepal) Shrestha

17 February 1982 1982 Quaid-e-Azam International Tournament	Pakistan Blues	2–1	(China) Shandong	Karachi, Pakistan
	Anwar 5' (?)	Report	Wang Dezhang 10'	Stadium: National Stadium; Referee: (Iran) Behman Bahadur

18 February 1982 1982 Quaid-e-Azam International Tournament	Iran	4–1	Pakistan Blues	Karachi, Pakistan
	Kargar 3'; Kamil Anjini 59'; Mayeli (?); Mahmoud Haghighian (?)	Report	Zulfiqar 65'	Stadium: National Stadium; Referee: (Nepal) Shrestha

23 February 1982 1982 Quaid-e-Azam International Tournament	Pakistan Blues	0–0	Pakistan Greens	Karachi, Pakistan
		Report		Stadium: National Stadium; Referee: (Iran) Behman Bahadur

=== 1985 ===
29 April 1985 1985 Quaid-e-Azam International Tournament	Indonesia Youth	2–0	Pakistan Whites	Peshawar, Pakistan
	Noach Mariem 14'; Theodorus Bitbit 19'	Report		Stadium: Qayyum Stadium

30 April 1985 1985 Quaid-e-Azam International Tournament	Bangladesh	3–0	Pakistan Whites	Peshawar, Pakistan
	Khurshid Alam Babul 22'; Ashrafuddin Ahmed Chunnu 40'; Elias Hossain 85+'	Report		Stadium: Qayyum Stadium

=== 1986 ===
26 April 1986 1986 Quaid-e-Azam International Tournament	Pakistan Whites	0–7	China	Islamabad, Islamabad
		Report		Stadium: Jinnah Sports Stadium

27 April 1986 1986 Quaid-e-Azam International Tournament	Pakistan Whites	0–4	South Korea Industrial Selection	Islamabad, Islamabad
		Report	Oh Seok-jae (?)	Stadium: Jinnah Sports Stadium

28 April 1986 1986 Quaid-e-Azam International Tournament	Pakistan Whites	2–3	Sri Lanka	Islamabad, Islamabad
		Report		Stadium: Jinnah Sports Stadium

30 April 1986 1986 Quaid-e-Azam International Tournament	Pakistan Greens	7–0	Pakistan Whites	Islamabad, Islamabad
		Report		Stadium: Jinnah Sports Stadium

1 May 1986 1986 Quaid-e-Azam International Tournament	Pakistan Whites	0–2	Nepal	Islamabad, Islamabad
		Report	Umesh Pradhan (?); Kedar Manandhar (?)	Stadium: Jinnah Sports Stadium

=== 1987 ===
15 September 1987 1987 Quaid-e-Azam International Tournament	Pakistan Whites	1–0	Pakistan Blues	Lahore, Pakistan
	Sarwar 54'	Report		Stadium: Railway Stadium

17 September 1987 1987 Quaid-e-Azam International Tournament	Nepal XI	0–2	Pakistan Whites	Lahore, Pakistan
		Report	Sattar 6'; Sarwar 49'	Stadium: Railway Stadium

19 September 1987 1987 Quaid-e-Azam International Tournament	Pakistan Whites	1–1	Bangladesh	Lahore, Pakistan
	Sarwar 85'	Report	Azmat 63'	Stadium: Railway Stadium

22 September 1987 1987 Quaid-e-Azam International Tournament	Pakistan Greens	0–1	Pakistan Whites	Lahore, Pakistan
		Report	Sarwar 47' (pen.)	Stadium: Railway Stadium

24 September 1987 1987 Quaid-e-Azam International Tournament	Guangzhou (China)	3–1	Pakistan Whites	Lahore, Pakistan
	Li Chaobo 12'; Ma Jianqiang 26', 35'	Report	Anees 16'	Stadium: Railway Stadium

=== 1993 ===
6 June 1993 1993 ECO Cup	Iran	5–0	Pakistan A	Tehran, Iran
	Javad Zarincheh 42'; Hamid Derakhshan 49'; Karim Bagheri 65'; Samad Marfavi 70'; Majid Namjoo-Motlagh 75'	Report		Stadium: Azadi Stadium; Attendance: 15,000; Referee: Hossein Khoshkhan (Iran)

7 June 1993 1993 ECO Cup	Turkmenistan	4–0	Pakistan A	Tehran, Iran
	Nurmyradow 5', 10'; Muhadow 60', 80'	Report		Stadium: Azadi Stadium

17 July 1993 1993 SAARC Gold Cup	Pakistan Whites	0–0	Nepal	Lahore, Pakistan
		Report		Stadium: Railway Stadium

18 July 1993 1993 SAARC Gold Cup	Pakistan Whites	1–3	India	Lahore, Pakistan
		Report	Vijayan (?); Kumaresh Bhawal (?)	Stadium: Railway Stadium

20 July 1993 1993 SAARC Gold Cup	Pakistan Whites	0–2	Pakistan	Lahore, Pakistan
		Report	Adeel Sarfraz Butt 7'; Ashfaq 30'	Stadium: Railway Stadium

22 July 1993 1993 SAARC Gold Cup	Pakistan Whites	1–2	Sri Lanka	Lahore, Pakistan
	Athar (?)	Report	Silva (?); Perera (?)	Stadium: Railway Stadium

=== 2007 ===
9 April 2007 E. K. Nayanar Memorial Gold Cup	Pakistan Football Federation XI	0–0	(India) State Bank of Travancore	Kannur, India
		Report		Stadium: Jawahar Municipal Stadium

12 April 2007 E. K. Nayanar Memorial Gold Cup	Pakistan Football Federation XI	0–0	(Ghana) F.C. Nania	Kannur, India
		Report		Stadium: Jawahar Municipal Stadium

13 April 2007 E. K. Nayanar Memorial Gold Cup	Pakistan Football Federation XI	1–2	(India) Vasco SC	Kannur, India
	Shahid 44'	Report	Keke Ibrahim 17'; Agnelo D'Souza 80'	Stadium: Jawahar Municipal Stadium

== Youth teams ==
The Pakistan Football Federation has also fielded additional representative teams at youth level. At the 2006 AFC U-14 Festival, where Pakistan participated as hosts, two sides were entered as Pakistan and Pakistan A. A similar arrangement was used at the 2012 edition in Islamabad, when Pakistan A was added as a second string team to the tournament following the withdrawal of several participating teams. Pakistan and Pakistan A competed separately during the festival and also played against each other.

== Competitive record ==
=== Quaid-e-Azam International Tournament ===
Quaid-e-Azam International Tournament record
Year	Result	Position	GP	W	D	L	GF	GA	Name
1976	N/A	N/A	2	0	0	2	4	11	Pakistan Reds
1982	Runners-up	2nd	6	3	2	1	8	8	Pakistan Blues
1985	Group-stage	5th	2	0	0	2	0	5	Pakistan Whites
1986	Group-stage	5th	5	0	0	5	2	23	Pakistan Whites
1987	Runners-up	2nd	N/A	N/A	N/A	N/A	N/A	N/A	Pakistan Whites

- Source = RSSSF

=== Other tournaments ===
Invitational tournament record
Year	Result	Position	GP	W	D	L	GF	GA	Name
1993 ECO Cup	Group-stage	3rd	2	0	0	0	0	9	Pakistan A

== See also ==
- Pakistan A cricket team
