= Quaid-e-Azam International Tournament =

- Organiser(s): Pakistan Football Federation
- Founded: 1976; 50 years ago
- Abolished: 1987; 39 years ago
- Region: Asia

The Quaid-e-Azam International Tournament was an annual football tournament held in Pakistan. The tournament was established to commemorate the centenary of the birth of Muhammad Ali Jinnah, the first leader of Pakistan, known as Quaid-e-Azam (Great Leader). It was last played in 1987, and a total of five editions were played starting from 1976. The tournament was played with a round robin format in 1976, 1982 and 1986, while the other two editions in 1985 and 1987, were played in a double group format. Both senior national team alongside club teams took part in the tournament.

== Results ==
Year	Winner	Runner-up	Third place	Fourth place	Teams
1976; Details	(China) Guangdong	Pakistan Greens	Afghanistan	None	3
1982; Details	Iran	Pakistan Blues	Pakistan Greens	Oman	7
1985; Details	North Korea XI	Bangladesh	Indonesia Youth	Pakistan Greens	6
1986; Details	China	Pakistan Greens	South Korea Works Selection	Sri Lanka	6
1987; Details	(China) Guangzhou	Pakistan Whites	Pakistan Greens	Bangladesh	8

== Stadiums ==
Year	Stadium	Location
1976	Hockey Club of Pakistan	Karachi, Sindh
1982	National Stadium	Karachi, Sindh
1985	Qayyum Stadium	Peshawar
1986	Jinnah Sports Stadium	Islamabad
1987	Railway Stadium	Lahore

== Awards ==
=== Most Valuable Player ===
Year	Player	Team
1982	(Iran) Abdolali Changiz	Iran

=== Top goalscorer ===
Year	Player	Team	Goals
1976	(China) Rong Zhixing	(China) Guangdong	3
1982	(Iran) Kamil Anjini (Pakistan) Mahmood Anwar	Iran; Pakistan Blues	5
1985	Unknown	Unknown	Unknown
1986	Unknown	Unknown	Unknown
1987	(Pakistan) Ghulam Sarwar Teddy (Pakistan) Sharafat Ali (China) Ma Jianqiang	Pakistan Whites; Pakistan Greens (China) Guangzhou	4

== See also ==
- Football in Asia
- Football in Pakistan
