= Sharafat Ali (footballer) =

Pakistani footballer

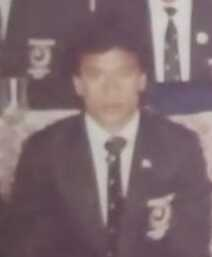
- Sharafat in 1987

Personal information
- Date of birth: 1 June 1966 (age 60)
- Place of birth: Multan, Pakistan
- Position: Striker

Youth career
- Pak Fighters

Senior career*
| Years | Team | Apps | (Gls) |
| 1983–1993 | WAPDA | | |

International career
| 1984–1992 | Pakistan | 32 | (12) |

Managerial career
- 2011–2012: WAPDA
Medal record
Men's football
Representing Pakistan
South Asian Games
| Gold medal – first place | 1989 Islamabad | Team competition |
| Gold medal – first place | 1991 Colombo | Team competition |
| Bronze medal – third place | 1987 Kolkata | Team competition |
- * Club domestic league appearances and goals

Sharafat Ali (Urdu: شرافت علی; born 1 June 1966) is a Pakistani former footballer who played as a striker. Ali was praised for his goalscoring abilities, and is credited for scoring Pakistan's first ever goal in the FIFA World Cup qualifiers in the country's first participation in 1989.

Starting his youth career with local club Pak Fighters, Ali won the 1981 National Youth Championship with the regional Multan Division youth team. He later represented departmental side WAPDA throughout his career at the National Football Championship, winning two national titles.

Ali was a key player for Pakistan in the 1980s and 1990s, initially standing out as a regular goal scorer in the 1984 Merdeka Tournament. In the 1984 AFC Asian Cup qualification, Ali scored a hat trick in a 4–1 victory against North Yemen, registering Pakistan's lone win in the competition. In 1987, Ali was appointed as captain for the 1987 Quaid-e-Azam International Tournament. On 10 February 1989, Ali became the first player to score a goal for Pakistan in the FIFA World Cup qualifiers in their first participation in the 1990 FIFA World Cup qualification, scoring through a penalty kick in a 1–4 loss against UAE. He also won the 1989 and 1991 South Asian Games with Pakistan.

== Early life ==
Ali was born on 1 June 1966 in Multan in the Punjab province of Pakistan. The second oldest among four brothers, Ali matriculated from Government Pilot Secondary School in Multan.

== Club career ==
=== Youth career ===
Ali started playing football at the age of 10, joining Pak Fighters Football Club. During the 1981 National Youth Championship, Ali represented the Multan Division youth team, and scored the lone goal in the final against Sargodha Division youth team.

=== WAPDA ===
In 1983, Ali joined WAPDA, helping the side winning their first trophy in their first participation in the 1983 National Football Championship, scoring in the Penalty shoot-out which resulted in a 5–4 final victory against Habib Bank. Sharafat was also part of WAPDA during the National Games, winning gold in the 24th edition of the National Games in 1992 and winning silver the following year.

== International career ==
Ali was first selected for the Pakistan national football team at the 1982 Bangladesh President's Gold Cup. The next year, he played in two test matches against the visiting South-West Region German team in Rawalpindi and Karachi.

Ali participated in the 1984 Merdeka Tournament, scoring in a 1–2 defeat against South Korea U20, Primera B XI of Argentina, and two goals in a 2–0 victory against Algeria U20. In the 1984 AFC Asian Cup qualification, Ali scored a hat trick in a 4–1 victory against North Yemen, registering Pakistan's lone win in the competition. The next year, he scored two goals at the 1985 Quaid-e-Azam International Tournament held in Peshawar in a 1–0 victory against Nepal and a 1–3 defeat against Bangladesh. He also participated in the subsequent 1986 Quaid-e-Azam International Tournament held in Islamabad.

At the 1988 Summer Olympics qualification in April 1987, he scored a brace in a 2–2 draw against Nepal. In 1987, Ali was appointed as the 36th captain of the Pakistan national team when Quaid-e-Azam International Tournament was held in Lahore. His long range goal in the 1987 South Asian Games against Maldives placed Pakistan second in the group stages, to advance to the third place match against Bangladesh where he again scored the lone goal in the 41st minute to win the bronze medal for Pakistan.

On 10 February 1989, Ali became the first player to score a goal for Pakistan in the FIFA World Cup qualifiers in their first participation in the 1990 FIFA World Cup qualification, scoring through a penalty kick in the 83rd minute in a 1–4 loss against UAE. Ali played in the 1989 South Asian Games, scoring a goal in a 2–0 victory against Maldives along with Qazi Ashfaq, as Pakistan passed the group stages and won the title by defeating Bangladesh in the final.

In the subsequent 1991 South Asian Games in Colombo under the captainship of Ghulam Sarwar Teddy, Ali again won the gold with Pakistan, after defeating Maldives in the final by 2–0. Ali thus became the only Pakistani player to represent the national team in three South Asian Games editions and to have a medal in all three.

== Managerial career ==
Ali served as coach of WAPDA from 2011 to 2012 in absence of Khalid Butt.

== Career statistics ==
=== International goals ===
Scores and results list Pakistan's goal tally first, score column indicates score after each Sharafat goal.

List of international goals scored by Sharafat Ali
| No. | Date | Venue | Opponent | Score | Result | Competition | Ref. |
|---|---|---|---|---|---|---|---|
| 1 | 15 October 1984 | Salt Lake Stadium, Kolkata, India | North Yemen | 1–0 | 4–1 | 1984 AFC Asian Cup qualification | |
| 2 | 15 October 1984 | Salt Lake Stadium, Kolkata, India | North Yemen | 3–1 | 4–1 | 1984 AFC Asian Cup qualification | |
| 3 | 15 October 1984 | Salt Lake Stadium, Kolkata, India | North Yemen | 4–1 | 4–1 | 1984 AFC Asian Cup qualification | |
| 4 | 30 April 1985 | Qayyum Stadium, Peshawar, Pakistan | Nepal | 1–0 | 1–0 | 1985 Quaid-e-Azam International Tournament | |
| 5 | 2 May 1985 | Qayyum Stadium, Peshawar, Pakistan | Bangladesh | 1–2 | 1–3 | 1985 Quaid-e-Azam International Tournament | |
| 6 | 25 April 1987 | Kathmandu, Nepal | Nepal | 1–1 | 2–2 | 1988 Summer Olympics qualification | |
| 7 | 25 April 1987 | Kathmandu, Nepal | Nepal | 2–2 | 2–2 | 1988 Summer Olympics qualification | |
| 8 | 22 November 1987 | Salt Lake Stadium, Kolkata, India | Maldives | 1–0 | 1–0 | 1987 South Asian Games | |
| 9 | 25 November 1987 | Salt Lake Stadium, Kolkata, India | Bangladesh | 1–0 | 1–0 | 1987 South Asian Games | |
| 10 | 10 February 1989 | Jinnah Sports Stadium, Islamabad, Pakistan | United Arab Emirates | 1–4 | 1–4 | 1990 FIFA World Cup qualification | |
| 11 | 24 October 1989 | Jinnah Sports Stadium, Islamabad, Pakistan | Maldives | 2–0 | 2–0 | 1989 South Asian Games | |
| 12 | 27 September 1990 | Xiannongtan Stadium, Beijing, China | Singapore | 1–3 | 1–6 | 1990 Asian Games | |

== Honours ==
=== Multan Youth Division ===
- National Youth Football Championship
  - Winners (1): 1981

=== WAPDA ===
- National Football Championship
  - Winners (2): 1983, 1991

=== Pakistan ===
- South Asian Games
  - Winners (2): 1989, 1991

== See also ==
- List of Pakistan national football team captains
- List of Pakistan national football team hat-tricks
