= 1987 Quaid-e-Azam International Tournament =

Tournament details
- Host country: Pakistan
- Dates: 15 September–24 September 1987
- Teams: 8 (from 1 confederation)
- Venue: Railway Stadium

Final positions
- Champions: (China) Guangzhou (1st title)
- Runners-up: Pakistan Whites
- Third place: Pakistan Greens

Tournament statistics
- Matches played: 15
- Goals scored: 36 (2.4 per match)
- Top scorer(s): (Pakistan) Ghulam Sarwar Teddy (Pakistan) Sharafat Ali (China) Ma Jianqiang (4 goals)

The 1987 Quaid-e-Azam International Tournament was the fifth edition of the Quaid-e-Azam International Tournament. The event was held at the Railway Stadium in Lahore, Pakistan.

== Venue ==
Lahore	1987 Quaid-e-Azam International Tournament is located in Pakistan
Railway Stadium	1987 Quaid-e-Azam International Tournament is located in Pakistan
Capacity: 5,000	1987 Quaid-e-Azam International Tournament is located in Pakistan

== Overview ==
The fifth edition of the Quaid-e-Azam International Football Tournament was held at the Railway Stadium in Lahore from 15 to 24 September 1987. Teams from Bangladesh, China, Maldives and Nepal participated, alongside four Pakistani teams. Pakistan Greens captained by Sharafat Ali was the A team, while Pakistan Whites captained by Ghulam Sarwar Teddy was the B team. Pakistan Blues and Yellows were the youth teams. Guagzhou and possibly Victory Sports Club represented China and Maldives, while the Nepali team was not the full national team, which was playing the Olympics Qualifiers. The status of the Bangladesh team is not clear.

Guangzhou secured a place in the final after defeating Bangladesh 2–0 in the semifinal. In the third-place match, Pakistan Greens were awarded the bronze medal after Bangladesh forfeited the contest by request of the Bangladesh delegation, which resulted in Pakistan Greens winning the third place.

The final match featured Guangzhou against Pakistan Whites, with Guangzhou emerging victorious with a 3–1 win. The Chinese team took an early lead in the 12th minute through a goal by Li Chaobo, assisted by Jiang Guliang. Pakistan Whites equalised shortly after via inside-left Anees, who converted a free kick from the right flank. However, Guangzhou regained the lead with a headed goal by Ma Jianqiang, who also scored again before halftime, giving Guangzhou a 3–1 advantage at the break.

== Group stage ==
=== Group A ===
Pos	Team	Pld	W	D	L	GF	GA	GD	Pts	Qualification
1	Pakistan Whites	3	2	1	0	4	1	+3	5	Advance to the semi-finals
2	Bangladesh	3	1	2	0	3	1	+2	4	Advance to the semi-finals
3	Pakistan Blues	3	1	1	1	1	1	0	3	
4	Nepal XI	3	0	0	3	0	5	−5	0	

Source: RSSSF
15 September 1987

Pakistan Whites	1–0	Pakistan Blues
Sarwar 54'	Report

Railway Stadium, Lahore

17 September 1987

Nepal XI	0–2	Pakistan Whites
	Report	Sattar 6'; Sarwar 49'

Railway Stadium, Lahore

18 September 1987

Nepal XI	0–2	Bangladesh
	Report	Das 68'; Zia Ul Haque Babu 83'

Railway Stadium, Lahore

19 September 1987

Pakistan Whites	1–1	Bangladesh
Sarwar 85'	Report	Azmat 63'

Railway Stadium, Lahore

20 September 1987

Nepal XI	0–1	Pakistan Blues
	Report	Saleem 90' (pen.)

Railway Stadium, Lahore

21 September 1987

Pakistan Blues	0–0	Bangladesh
	Report

Railway Stadium, Lahore

=== Group B ===
Pos	Team	Pld	W	D	L	GF	GA	GD	Pts	Qualification
1	(China) Guangzhou	3	3	0	0	10	1	+9	6	Advance to the semi-finals
2	Pakistan Greens	3	2	0	1	9	2	+7	4	Advance to the semi-finals
3	Maldives XI	3	1	0	2	2	8	−6	2	
4	Pakistan Yellows	3	0	0	3	0	10	−10	0	

Source: RSSSF
16 September 1987

Guangzhou (China)	4–0	Pakistan Yellows
Wu Wang 5'; Gu Guang 41', 44'; Liu Kang (?)	Report

Railway Stadium, Lahore

17 September 1987

Guangzhou (China)	2–1	Pakistan Greens
Ma Jiangqiang 24'; Wu Qunli 43'	Report	Wahid 31'

Railway Stadium, Lahore

18 September 1987

Maldives XI	2–0	Pakistan Yellows
Ahmed Haleem 59'; Hussain Adam 67'	Report

Railway Stadium, Lahore

19 September 1987

Pakistan Greens	4–0	Pakistan Yellows
Sharafat 10', 16'; Ijaz 20' (?)	Report

Railway Stadium, Lahore

20 September 1987

Guangzhou (China)	4–0	Maldives XI
Wang Chang 27'; Ma Jianqiang 38'; Shen Yinghua 58'; Guo Chaoming 68'	Report

Railway Stadium, Lahore

21 September 1987

Pakistan Greens	4–0	Maldives XI
Sharafat 2', 28'; Ijaz 19'; Saleem Patni 24'	Report

Railway Stadium, Lahore

== Knockout stage ==
=== Semi-finals ===
22 September 1987

Pakistan Greens	0–1	Pakistan Whites
	Report	Sarwar 47' (pen.)

Railway Stadium, Lahore

23 September 1987

Guangzhou (China)	2–0	Bangladesh
Wu Qunli 31'; Wang Chang 51'	Report

Railway Stadium, Lahore

=== Third-place match ===
24 September 1987

Pakistan Greens	Walkover	Bangladesh
	Report

Railway Stadium, Lahore

=== Final ===
24 September 1987

Guangzhou (China)	3–1	Pakistan Whites
Li Chaobo 12'; Ma Jianqiang 26', 35'	Report	Anees 16'

Railway Stadium, Lahore

== Statistics ==
=== Goalscorers ===
There were 36 goals scored in 15 matches, for an average of 2.4 goals per match.

4 goals

- (Pakistan) Ghulam Sarwar Teddy
- (Pakistan) Sharafat Ali
- (China) Ma Jianqiang

3 goals

- (Pakistan) Ijaz

2 goals

- (China) Gu Guang
- (China) Wu Qunli
- (China) Wang Chang

1 goal

- (Pakistan) Sattar
- (Bangladesh) Azmat Ali
- (Pakistan) Saleem
- (Bangladesh) Badal Das
- (Bangladesh) Zia Ul Haque Babu
- (China) Wu Wang
- (China) Liu Kang
- (Pakistan) Abdul Wahid
- (Maldives) Ahmed Haleem
- (Maldives) Hussain Adam
- (Pakistan) Saleem Patni
- (China) Shen Yinghua
- (China) Guo Chaoming
- (China) Li Chaobo
- (Pakistan) Anees
