= Zulfiqar Hussain Dogar =

Pakistani footballer (Unknown Birthdate)

Personal information
- Full name: Malik Zulfiqar Hussain Dogar
- Date of birth: Unknown
- Place of birth: Muzaffargarh, Pakistan
- Position: Defender

Senior career*
Years	Team	Apps	(Gls)
1983–1989	WAPDA		

International career
1986	Pakistan Whites		(0)
1987–1989	Pakistan		
- * Club domestic league appearances and goals

Malik Zulfiqar Hussain Dogar (Urdu: ملک ذوالفقار حسین ڈوگر), is a Pakistani former footballer who played as a defender. He is considered as one of the most prominent Pakistani footballers of the 1980s, Dogar played for WAPDA during the 1980s, He also represented the Pakistan national football team, winning the 1989 South Asian Games with the team.

== Club career ==
Dogar played for WAPDA in the 1980s. In his debut season, he helped the club win the 1983 National Football Championship.

== International career ==
Dogar captained the second string Pakistan Whites for the 1986 Quaid-e-Azam International Tournament. He would go on to make his debut for Pakistan senior team in 1987. The next year, he participated in the 1988 AFC Asian Cup qualification.

He was a starting defender at the 1990 FIFA World Cup qualification in the country's first participation in the tournament. He was also included in the starting line-up for the 1989 South Asian Games final where Pakistan won the gold against Bangladesh. In the final, Dogar gave an assist to Abdul Sattar to score the winning goal of the match.

== Political career ==
After retiring as footballer, Dogar became associated with politics. He is associated with the political party Pakistan Tehreek-e-Insaf (PTI).

== Honours ==
=== WAPDA ===
- National Football Championship
  - Winners (1): 1983

=== Pakistan ===
- South Asian Games: 1989
