= 1993 SAARC Gold Cup =

Tournament details
- Host country: Pakistan
- Dates: 16–23 July
- Teams: 4
- Venue: 1 (in 1 host city)

Final positions
- Champions: India (1st title)
- Runners-up: Sri Lanka
- Third place: Nepal
- Fourth place: Pakistan

Tournament statistics
- Matches played: 6
- Goals scored: 11 (1.83 per match)
- Top scorer: (India) I. M. Vijayan (3 goals)

The 1993 South Asian Association of Regional Co-operation Gold Cup was the inaugural international association football championship for national teams from South Asia organised by the South Asian Football Federation (SAFF). Hosted by Pakistan, the competition ran from 16 to 23 July 1993 and was contested by the national teams of India, Nepal, Pakistan and Sri Lanka.

The round robin tournament began with the first round of matches on 16 July 1993 and ended with the final match on 23 July 1993. In addition to the main tournament, a number of friendly matches involving a junior team representing Pakistan – known as Pakistan Whites – were contested.

India were crowned champions of the inaugural tournament after defeating Nepal 1–0 in the penultimate match.

== Background ==
The first edition of the South Asian Football Federation Championship, known as the South Asian Association of Regional Co-operation Gold Cup, was held Lahore, Pakistan.

== Format ==
For the inaugural competition, the four teams would contest a single round robin group to decide the winner. Additionally, each nation played a single match against a junior team representing Pakistan – known as Pakistan Whites. Matches against Pakistan Whites did not count towards the final standings.

=== Participants ===
- India
- Nepal
- Pakistan
- Sri Lanka

== Venue ==
Matches were played at the Railway Stadium in Lahore.

Lahore	1993 SAARC Gold Cup is located in Pakistan
Railway Stadium	1993 SAARC Gold Cup is located in Pakistan
Capacity: 5,000	1993 SAARC Gold Cup is located in Pakistan

== Summary ==
In the opening round of matches on 16 July, India defeated Sri Lanka 2–0 while Nepal and Pakistan played out a 1–1 draw. Two days later, Sri Lanka defeated Pakistan 4–0.

On July 19, Sri Lanka played their final match, a goalless draw with Nepal. The result left Sri Lanka with four points, India with three, Nepal with two and Pakistan with one. As a result, a win for India against Nepal would secure them the inaugural title with a match to spare.

Two days later, India defeated Nepal 1–0 thanks to a goal from I. M. Vijayan as they won the title. India and Pakistan rounded off the competition by playing out a 1–1 draw in the final match on July 23.

== Table ==
Pos	Team	Pld	W	D	L	GF	GA	GD	Pts	Final result
1	India	3	2	1	0	4	1	+3	7	Champions
2	Sri Lanka	3	1	1	1	4	2	+2	4	
3	Nepal	3	0	2	1	1	2	−1	2	
4	Pakistan	3	0	2	1	2	6	−4	2	

== Matches ==
16 July 1993

India	2–0	Sri Lanka
Vijayan; Gunabir Singh

Railway Stadium, Lahore
16 July 1993

Pakistan	1–1	Nepal
Ashfaq 60'		Umesh Pradhan 85'

Railway Stadium, Lahore

18 July 1993

Pakistan	0–4	Sri Lanka
		Roshan Perera 13'; Silva; Amanullah Kabir 54', 72'

Railway Stadium, Lahore

19 July 1993

Sri Lanka	0–0	Nepal

Railway Stadium, Lahore

21 July 1993

India	1–0	Nepal
Vijayan 67'

Railway Stadium, Lahore

23 July 1993

Pakistan	1–1	India
Nauman 47'		Vijayan 90'

Railway Stadium, Lahore
Attendance: 10,000

== Exhibition matches ==
17 July 1993

Pakistan Whites	0–0	Nepal

Railway Stadium, Lahore

18 July 1993

Pakistan Whites	1–3	India
Unknown		Vijayan (x2); Kumaresh Bhawal

Railway Stadium, Lahore

20 July 1993

Pakistan Whites	0–2	Pakistan
		Adeel Sarfraz Butt 7'; Ashfaq 30'

Railway Stadium, Lahore

22 July 1993

Pakistan Whites	1–2	Sri Lanka
Athar		Silva; Perera

Railway Stadium, Lahore
