= Mahmood Anwar =

Pakistani footballer (born 1960)

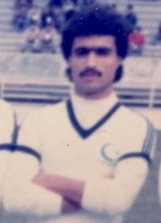
- Anwar with Pakistan at the 1986 Fajr International Tournament

Personal information
- Full name: Mahmood Anwar
- Date of birth: 1 January 1960 (age 66)
- Place of birth: Peshawar, Pakistan
- Position: Winger

Senior career*
| Years | Team | Apps | (Gls) |
| 1981 | National Bank | | |
| 1982–?? | Pakistan Airlines | | |

International career
| 1982 | Pakistan Blues | 6 | (5) |
| 1985–1986 | Pakistan | 3 | (1) |
- * Club domestic league appearances and goals

Mahmood Anwar (Urdu: محمود انور; born 1 January 1960), is a Pakistani former footballer who played as a Winger, he also represented Pakistan from 1985 to 1986.

== Club career ==
Mahmood first played for National Bank in 1981, and then joined Pakistan Airlines in 1982. He helped the club win the Inter-Provincial Championship in 1984.

== International career ==
Anwar was selected to represent the second string Pakistan Blues for the 1982 Quaid-e-Azam International Tournament held in Karachi. He featured in all matches as a starter. In the tournament, he scored a brace against Oman and Shandong XI, and also a goal against Bangladesh, finishing the campaign as joint top goal-scorer alongside Iranian player Kamil Anjini with 5 goals.

In 1985, Anwar received a call-up for the Pakistan national team for the 1985 South Asian Games, where he scored in the third-place play-off against Nepal. He also played at the 1986 Fajr International Tournament in Tehran.

== Career statistics ==
=== International goals ===
Scores and results list Pakistan's goal tally first, score column indicates score after each Anwar goal.

List of international goals scored by Mahmood Anwar
| No. | Date | Venue | Opponent | Score | Result | Competition | Ref. |
|---|---|---|---|---|---|---|---|
| 1 | 25 December 1985 | Dhaka Stadium, Dhaka, Bangladesh | Nepal | | 2–2 | 1985 South Asian Games | |

== Honours ==
=== PIA ===
- Inter-Provincial Championship:
  - Winners (1): 1984

=== Individual ===
- Quaid-e-Azam International Tournament:
  - Joint top goal-scorer: 1982 (5 goals)
