= I. M. Vijayan =

Indian footballer (born 1969)

I.M. Vijayan
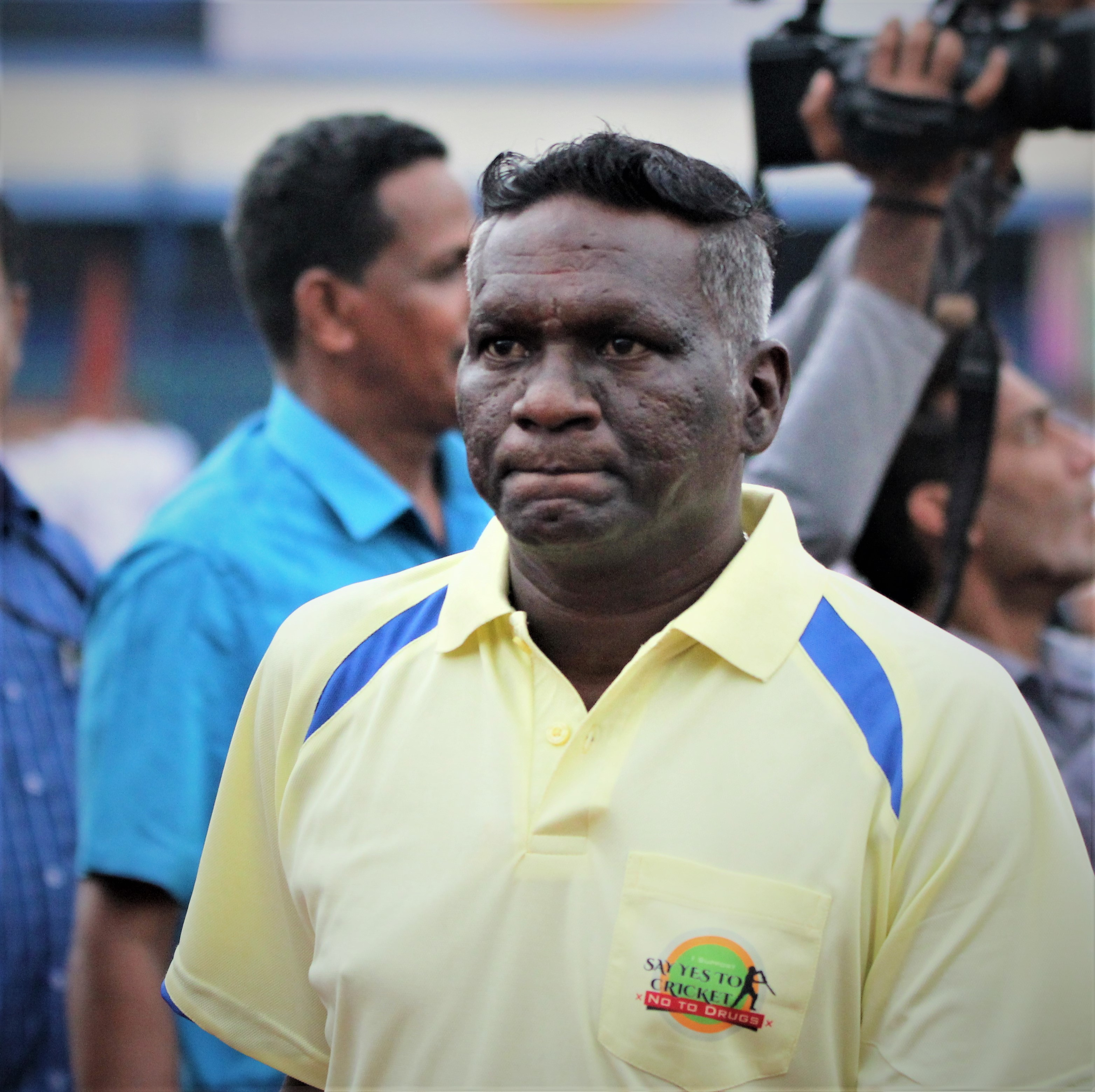
- Vijayan in 2017

Personal information
- Full name: Inivalappil Mani Vijayan
- Date of birth: 25 April 1969 (age 57)
- Place of birth: Thrissur, Kerala, India
- Height: 1.80 m (5 ft 11 in)
- Position: Striker

Senior career*
Years	Team	Apps	(Gls)
1987–1991	Kerala Police	?	(33)
1991–1992	Mohun Bagan	27	(27)
1992–1993	Kerala Police	?	(30)
1993–1994	Mohun Bagan	55	(18)
1994–1997	JCT Mills Phagwara	44	(19)
1997–1998	FC Kochin	50	(24)
1998–1999	Mohun Bagan	33	(15)
1999–2001	FC Kochin	47	(22)
2001–2002	East Bengal FC	18	(19)
2002–2004	JCT	34	(10)
2004–2005	Churchill Brothers	16	(22)
2005–2006	East Bengal FC	41	(11)
Total		365+	(250)

International career
1991–2003	India	74 (Note: The old footages of the match shows that Vijayan scored India's second goal in the South Asian Games final against Nepal which ended in a 2–2 draw and is confirmed by AIFF. However RSSSF doesn't include this goal in their statistics..Vijayan is wrongly credited a brace against Hong Kong in 1994 World Cup qualifier by RSSSF but according to FIFA the goal was scored by V. P. Sathyan.)	(29)
Medal record
Men's football
Representing India
South Asian Games
Gold medal – first place	1995 Madras	Team
Silver medal – second place	1993 Dhaka	Team
Bronze medal – third place	1999 Kathmandu	Team
SAFF Championship
Winner	1993 Lahore	Team
Winner	1997 Kathmandu	Team
Winner	1999 Goa	Team
Third place	2003 Dhaka	Team
- * Club domestic league appearances and goals

Inivalappil Mani Vijayan (Malayalam: [ɐjɐniʋɐɭɐpːil mɐɳi ʋidʒɐjɐn], born 25 April 1969), also known by the nickname Kalo Harin (Blackbuck), is an Indian former professional footballer who captained the India national football team. He played as a striker, where he formed a successful attacking partnership with Bhaichung Bhutia for the India national football team in the late nineties and early 2000s.

Vijayan started his career with the Kerala Police football club and rose to become one of the top names in domestic football. A highly aggressive player, he eventually became the highest earner in Indian club football as well as a regular choice in the Indian team.

Vijayan's talents attracted interest from the clubs in Malaysia and Thailand, although he spent his entire career in India until retirement. By the end of his career he had scored 30 international goals in 72 matches for India. Since retiring from international football, Vijayan has set up a football academy to train young players in his home town. He was the captain of Indian football team from 2000 to 2004.

Vijayan has also acted in some notable roles in many movies. One of his movies, Mmmmm was shortlisted for India's entry into the 93rd Academy Awards.

He received many awards and honors including the Arjuna Award in 2003 and Padma Shri in 2025.

== Early life and domestic career ==
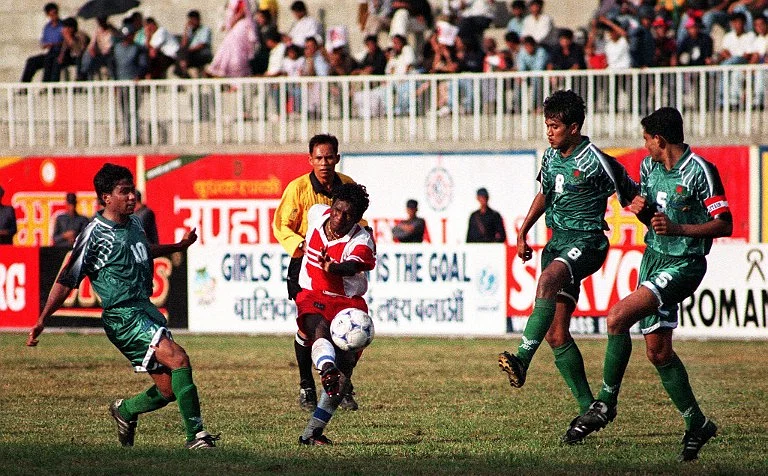
Vijayan in action for India against Bangladesh at the 1999 South Asian Games semi-finals

Vijayan was born into a Malayali family on 25 April 1969 in Thrissur City, Kerala. He began his life in a gravely poor environment and had to sell soda bottles in the Thrissur Municipal Corporation Stadium to help his family. He started out as a soda seller in the Thrissur Municipal Corporation Stadium, Kerala, earning 10 paise (0.02 cents) per bottle. He studied at Church Mission Society High School, Thrissur (CMSHSS, Thrissur).

Vijayan had passion for the game of football, and somehow caught the eye of the then DGP of Kerala, M.K. Joseph who got him selected for the Kerala Police football club at 17 years of age. Vijayan delivered brilliant performances for Kerala Police at Quilon Nationals 1987, and was able to impress the national football fraternity very soon with his impeccable skills and highly aggressive style of playing. He continued to play for Kerala Police until 1991. He then joined Mohun Bagan, before coming back to Kerala Police in 1992 and then switching back to Mohun Bagan the very next year for a second spell at the club. In 1994, he joined JCT Mills Phagwara and stayed with them for 3 more years until 1997, when he left JCT to join FC Kochin. After spending a one year tenure with the club, he moved once more to Mohun Bagan in 1998, his third spell with the club, and then returned to FC Kochin in 1999.

In August 2000, during the off-season, Vijayan joined the Bangladeshi Dhaka Premier Division League club Muktijoddha Sangsad and appeared in five league matches, while the lack of an international transfer certificate behind the signing caused a fine of 50,000 rupees by the All India Football Federation in March 2001. He rejoined FC Kochin later and played until 2001. He later signed with East Bengal before leaving in 2002 to join JCT Mills Phagwara once more. After finishing a two-year stint with the club, he left JCT in 2004 and joined Churchill Brothers S.C. He left the club after one year and joined East Bengal in 2005, which was his last professional football club as an active football player. He left East Bengal in 2006. In the 2020–21 season, Vijayan appeared with Gokulam Kerala's futsal team.

== International career ==
I.M. Vijayan made his debut in international football in the year 1992 and played in a number of tournaments such as Nehru Cup, Pre-Olympics, FIFA World Qualifiers, SAFF Championship and SAF Games. Vijayan was part of the victorious Indian team in the 1999 South Asian Football Federation Cup and scored one of the fastest international goals in history of sport during the tournament, hitting the net against Bhutan after only 12 seconds. He also finished top scorer in the Afro-Asian Games event held in India in 2003 with four goals. Vijayan formally retired from international football after the Afro-Asian Games of 2003.

== Career statistics ==
=== International ===
FIFA Statistics
Year	Apps	Goals
1991	2	0
1992	2	2
1993	17	6 (Note: The old footages of the match shows that Vijayan scored India's second goal in the South Asian Games final against Nepal which ended in a 2–2 draw and is confirmed by AIFF. However RSSSF doesn't include this goal in their statistics..Vijayan is wrongly credited a brace against Hong Kong in 1994 World Cup qualifier by RSSSF but according to FIFA the goal was scored by V. P. Sathyan.)
1994	4	0
1995	3	2
1996	3	0
1997	7	6
1998	7	1
1999	12 (Note: Bhutan Football Federation became a member of FIFA only in the year 2000. so, the match against Bhutan at the 1999 South Asian Games is not considered a FIFA 'A' international match by FIFA.)	10
2000	1	0
2001	8	3
2003	8	2
Total	74	29

Key
Indicates India national football team won the match
Indicates the match ended in draw
Indicates India national football team lost the match

List of international goals scored by I. M. Vijayan Scores and results list India's goal tally first
No.	Date	Venue	Opponent	Score	Result	Competition
1.	9 May 1992	Salt Lake Stadium, Kolkata	Pakistan	1–0	2–0	1992 Asian Cup qualifier
2.	9 May 1992	Salt Lake Stadium, Kolkata	Pakistan	2–0	2–0	1992 Asian Cup qualifier
3.	24 January 1993	Jawaharlal Nehru Stadium, Madras	Cameroon	1–0	1–1	1993 Nehru Cup
4.	13 June 1993	Bourj Hammoud Stadium, Beirut	Hong Kong	3–1	3–1	1994 World Cup qualifier
5.	16 July 1993	Railway Stadium, Lahore	Sri Lanka	1–0	2–0	1993 SAFF Championship
6.	21 July 1993	Railway Stadium, Lahore	Nepal	1–0	1–0	1993 SAFF Championship
7.	23 July 1993	Railway Stadium, Lahore	Pakistan	1–1	1–1	1993 SAFF Championship
8.	23 December 1993	Mirpur Stadium, Dhaka	Nepal	2–1	2–2 (Note: India lost 3–4 on penalty kicks.)	1993 South Asian Games
9.	23 December 1995	Jawaharlal Nehru Stadium, Madras	Sri Lanka	1–0	1–0	1995 South Asian Games
10.	25 December 1995	Jawaharlal Nehru Stadium, Madras	Nepal	1–0	3–0	1995 South Asian Games
11.	7 September 1997	Dasharath Rangasala, Kathmandu	Bangladesh	1–0	3–0	1997 SAFF Championship
12.	7 September 1997	Dasharath Rangasala, Kathmandu	Bangladesh	2–0	3–0	1997 SAFF Championship
13.	11 September 1997	Dasharath Rangasala, Kathmandu	Pakistan	1–0	2–0	1997 SAFF Championship
14.	11 September 1997	Dasharath Rangasala, Kathmandu	Pakistan	2–0	2–0	1997 SAFF Championship
15.	13 September 1997	Dasharath Rangasala, Kathmandu	Maldives	3–0	5–1	1997 SAFF Championship
16.	13 September 1997	Dasharath Rangasala, Kathmandu	Maldives	5–1	5–1	1997 SAFF Championship
17.	7 December 1998	Supachalasai Stadium, Bangkok	Turkmenistan	1–3	2–3	1998 Asian Games
18.	26 September 1999	Dasharath Rangasala, Kathmandu	Pakistan	3–0	5–2	1999 South Asian Games
19.	26 September 1999	Dasharath Rangasala, Kathmandu	Pakistan	4–0	5–2	1999 South Asian Games
20.	26 September 1999	Dasharath Rangasala, Kathmandu	Pakistan	5–0	5–2	1999 South Asian Games
21.	4 October 1999	Dasharath Rangasala, Kathmandu	Maldives	1–1	3–1	1999 South Asian Games
22.	20 November 1999	Tahnoun bin Mohammed Stadium, Abu Dhabi	United Arab Emirates	1–0	1–3	2000 Asian Cup qualifier
23.	24 November 1999	Tahnoun bin Mohammed Stadium, Abu Dhabi	Uzbekistan	2–1	2–3	2000 Asian Cup qualifier
24.	28 November 1999	Tahnoun bin Mohammed Stadium, Abu Dhabi	Bangladesh	1–0	2–2	2000 Asian Cup qualifier
25.	4 May 2001	Althawra Sports City Stadium, Sanaa	Yemen	3–2	3–3	2002 World Cup qualifier
26.	20 May 2001	Bangalore Football Stadium, Bangalore	Brunei	2–0	5–0	2002 World Cup qualifier
27.	26 June 2001	Stadium Merdeka, Kuala Lumpur	Uzbekistan	1–2	1–2	2001 Merdeka Tournament
28.	18 January 2003	Bangabandhu Stadium, Dhaka	Pakistan	1–0	2–1	2003 SAFF Championship
29.	24 March 2003	Fatorda Stadium, Margao	North Korea	1–0	1–1	2004 Asian Cup qualifier

== Honours ==
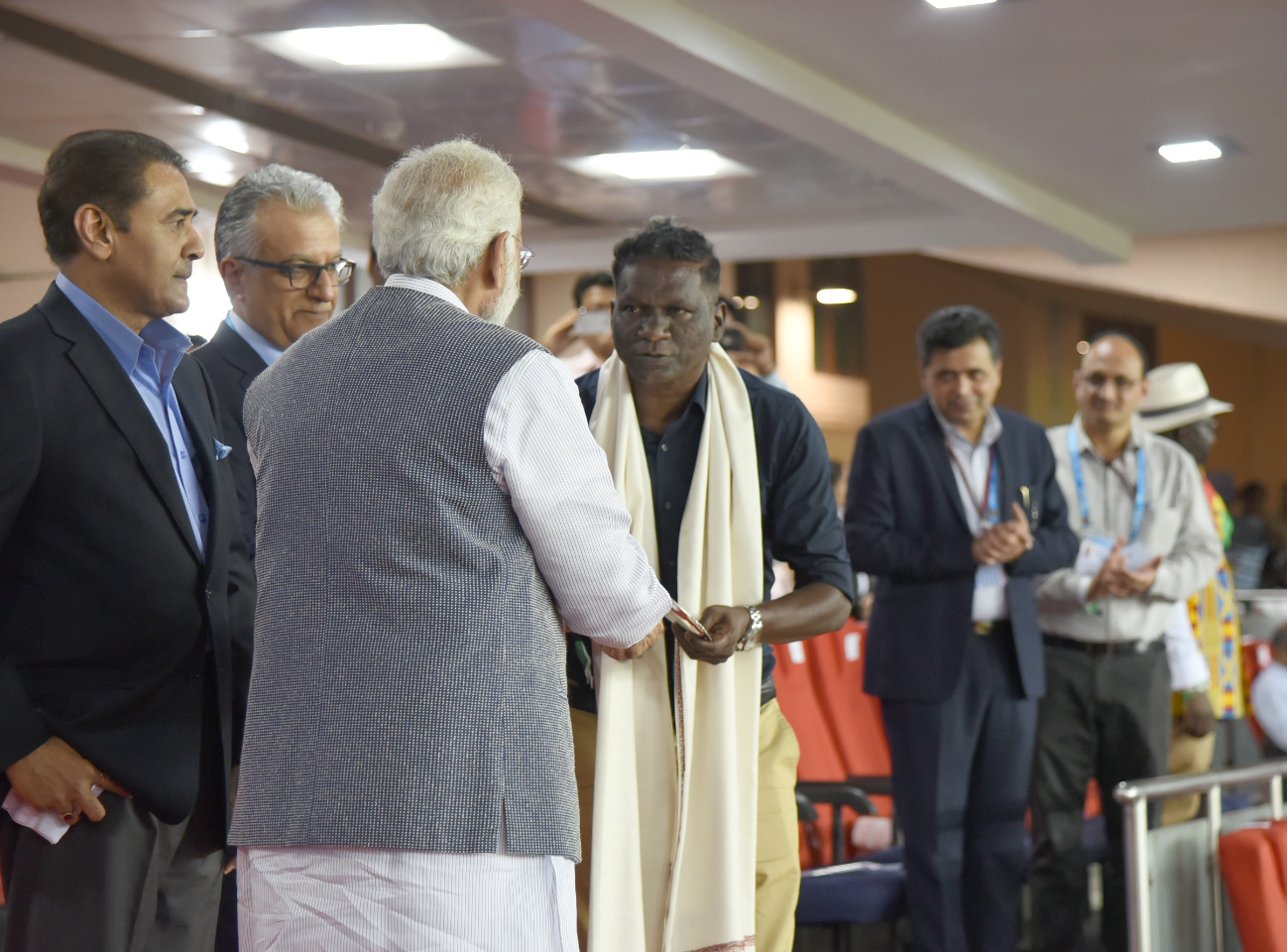
Vijayan being felicitated by Indian Prime Minister Narendra Modi at the 2017 FIFA U-17 World Cup opening ceremony, in New Delhi, 6 October 2017.

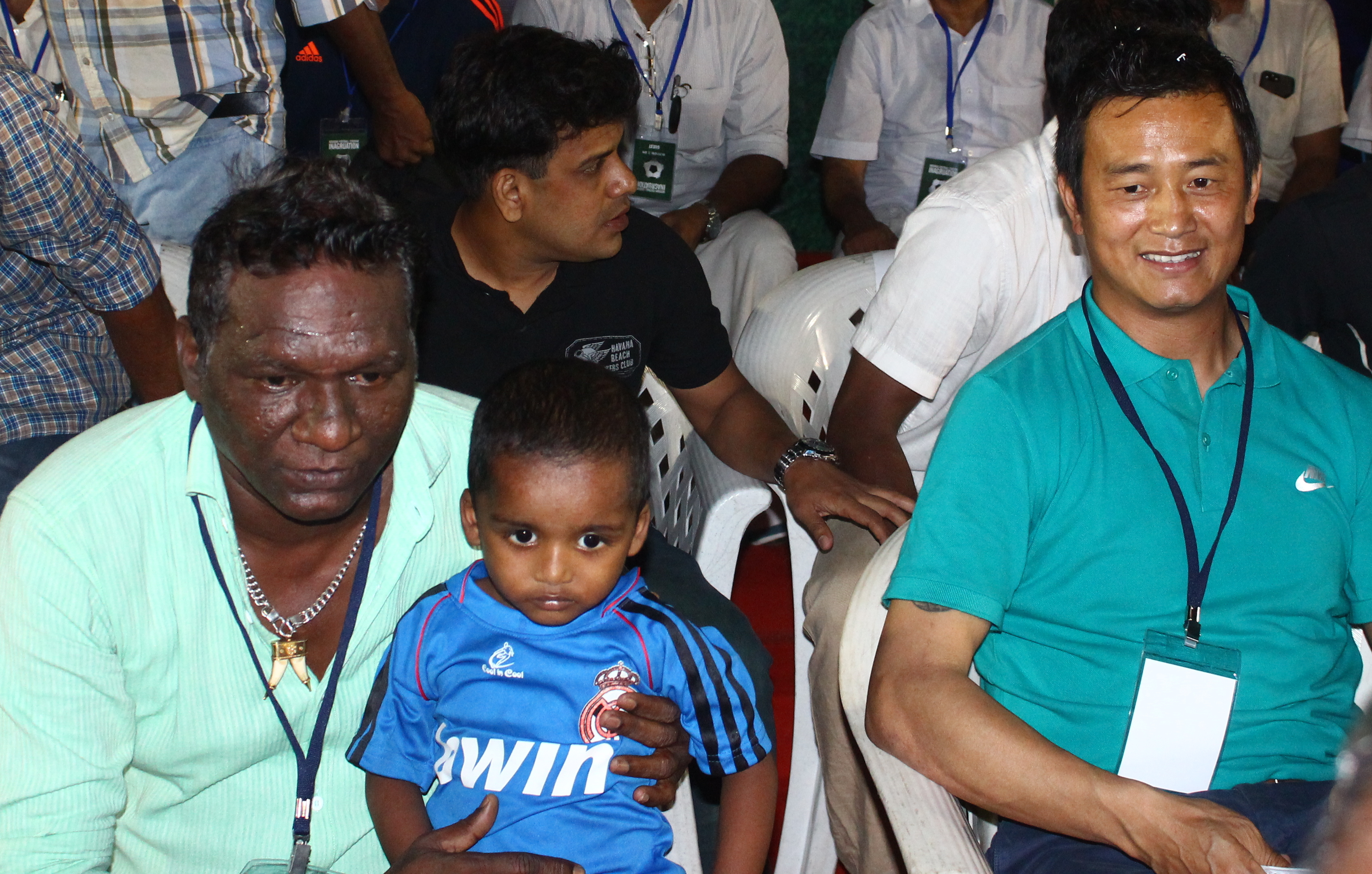
Vijayan with Bhaichung Bhutia in the inauguration ceremony of Palakkad Noorani Football stadium

India

- SAFF Championship: 1993, 1997, 1999; third place: 2003
- South Asian Games Gold medal: 1995; Silver medal: 1993; Bronze medal: 1999
- Afro-Asian Games Silver Medal: 2003

Kerala

- Santosh Trophy:
  - Winners:1992–93
  - Runners-up: 1987–88, 1988–89, 1989–90, 1990–91, 1999–2000

Bengal

- Santosh Trophy: 1993–94

Kerala Police

- Federation Cup: 1990, 1991

Mohun Bagan

- Federation Cup: 1992, 1993, 1994

JCT Mills

- Federation Cup: 1995, 1995-96

Individual

- Padma Shri: 2025
- Arjuna Award: 2003
- AIFF Player of the Year: 1992 , 1997, 2000
- Nehru Cup Best Player: 1993
- SAARC Gold Cup top scorer: 1993
- Afro-Asian Games top scorer: 1993
- Nominated for Padma Shri: 2020
- Honorary Doctorate from Northern State Medical University , Arkhangelsk , Russia .

== Kalo Harin ==
A biographical film, titled Kalo Harin and directed by Cherian Joseph, was released in 1998. The title translates as blackbuck and is a reference to Vijayan's popular nickname during his playing days.

== Acting career ==
After retiring from football, Vijayan started his acting career. His debut was through playing the lead role in the film Shantham, directed by Jayaraj. Later on, he went to act more than 20 films, in Malayalam & Tamil. In 2021, the movie 'Mmmmm' (sound of pain), starring Vijayan in the lead role was shortlisted as one of India's official entries for the Oscars.

Year	Title	Role	Notes
2001	Shantham	Velayudhan	
2001	Akashathile Paravakal	Walayar Manikyam	
2004	Quotation	Vettu Rajan	
2005	Ben Johnson		
2006	Thimiru	Chinna Karuppu	Tamil film
2006	Shyaamam		
2006	Kisan	Himself	
2006	Mahasamudram	Himself	
2012	Asuravithu	Valarpadam Kurudhu Musthafa	
2012	Bachelor Party		
2015	Komban	Muthukalai	Tamil film
2016	Gethu	Rajendran	Tamil film
2017	The Great Father	Anto	
2017	Mythili Veendum Varunnu		
2018	Mattancherry		
2018	Abrahaminte Santhathikal	DYSP Muhammed Jalal	
2019	Ganesha Meendum Santhipom	Katthari	Tamil film
2019	Porinju Mariam Jose	Kuriyachira George	
2019	Bigil	Alex	Tamil film
2021	Muddy		
2021	Mmmmm: Sound of Pain		Oscar shortlisted
2022	Siddy		
2022	The Teacher	Gunashekharan	
2022	Anaparambile Worldcup	Himself	
2024	Idiyan Chandhu		
2024	Adios Amigo	Himself	
2024	Gumasthan	Bhadran	

== Awards ==
Vijayan was crowned Indian Player of the Year in 1993, 1997 and 1999, the first player to win the award multiple times. He was also awarded the Arjuna Award in 2003. He received the Padma Shri in 2025.

== Family ==
Vijayan is married to Raji. He has 3 children: Aromal, Archana and Abhirami. He has a son in law, Abdul Aadil, and a granddaughter named Adeeva.

== Other activities ==
In 2004, he started a sports equipment company named "Boxer Sports Goods Company (BSGC)" in Thrissur.

After retirement from active football, Vijayan concentrated his attention upon his football School that he had opened in Thrissur.

He was also a member of the now defunct National Congress (Indira). In 2010, Vijayan formally took over a coaching job with Southern Samity, a premier division side in the Calcutta Football League. In March 2017, the Ministry of Youth Affairs and Sports, Government of India, appointed Vijayan as the national observer for football. In October 2018, Vijayan announced that he is starting a film production company called 'Bigdaddy Entertainment' jointly with his friends, which will be mainly revolving around football.

In January 2017, Vijayan officially unveiled the club crest of newly formed I-League club Gokulam. In February 2021, Vijayan was appointed as the director of Kerala Police Football Academy, a new police football academy, which is going to be set up in Malappuram.

On 2 September 2022, Vijayan was elected as a member of the technical committee of the All India Football Federation.

== See also ==
- AIFF Player of the Year
- List of India national football team hat-tricks
- List of India national football team captains
