= Siddy (film) =

- Directed by: Pious Raj
- Written by: Pious Raj
- Produced by: Maheswaran Nandagopal
- Starring: Aji John; Rajesh Sharma; Akshaya Udayakumar; I M Vijayan
- Cinematography: Karthik S. Nair
- Edited by: Ajith Unnikrishnan
- Music by: Ramesh Narayan
- Production company: Surya film Productions
- Release date: 7 October 2022
- Country: India
- Language: Malayalam

Siddy is a 2022 Malayalam-language thriller film, directed by Pious Raj for producer Maheswaran Nandagopal. The film stars Aji John and former International footballer I M Vijayan in lead roles. The debut directorial is heavily inspired by Fyodor Dostoevsky' s Crime and Punishment.

Principal photography started in August 2021 and the film will also be dubbed into Tamil.

== Summary ==
Siddy is the journey through the life and mind of a law student who turns into a murderer.

== Cast ==
- Aji John
- I. M. Vijayan
- Rajesh Sharma
- Akshaya Udayakumar
- Haritha Haridas
- Venu Nariyapuram
- Harikrishnan
- Madhu Vibhakar
- Divya Gopinath
- Thanuja Karthik
- Swapna Pillai

== Production ==
Pious Raj, an advertisement films director, inspired by Fyodor Dostoevsky' s Crime and Punishment, launched himself as director as Maheswaran Nandagopal bankrolled the project. Former International footballer and actor I M Vijayan was signed for an important role along with Aji John, an actor as well as director who has helmed Hotel California. Composer Ramesh Narayan who does only selective films was signed for the film with Karthik S.Nair, an associate of Ravi Varman as cinematographer. The film began the shooting at the time of second phase lockdown at the locations of Ernakulam, Vizhinjam harbour and Kovalam. Ramesh Narayan said that he signed the film, as the director wanted him to use Hindustani music as a different genre.
