= Abdul Wahid (footballer) =

Pakistani footballer

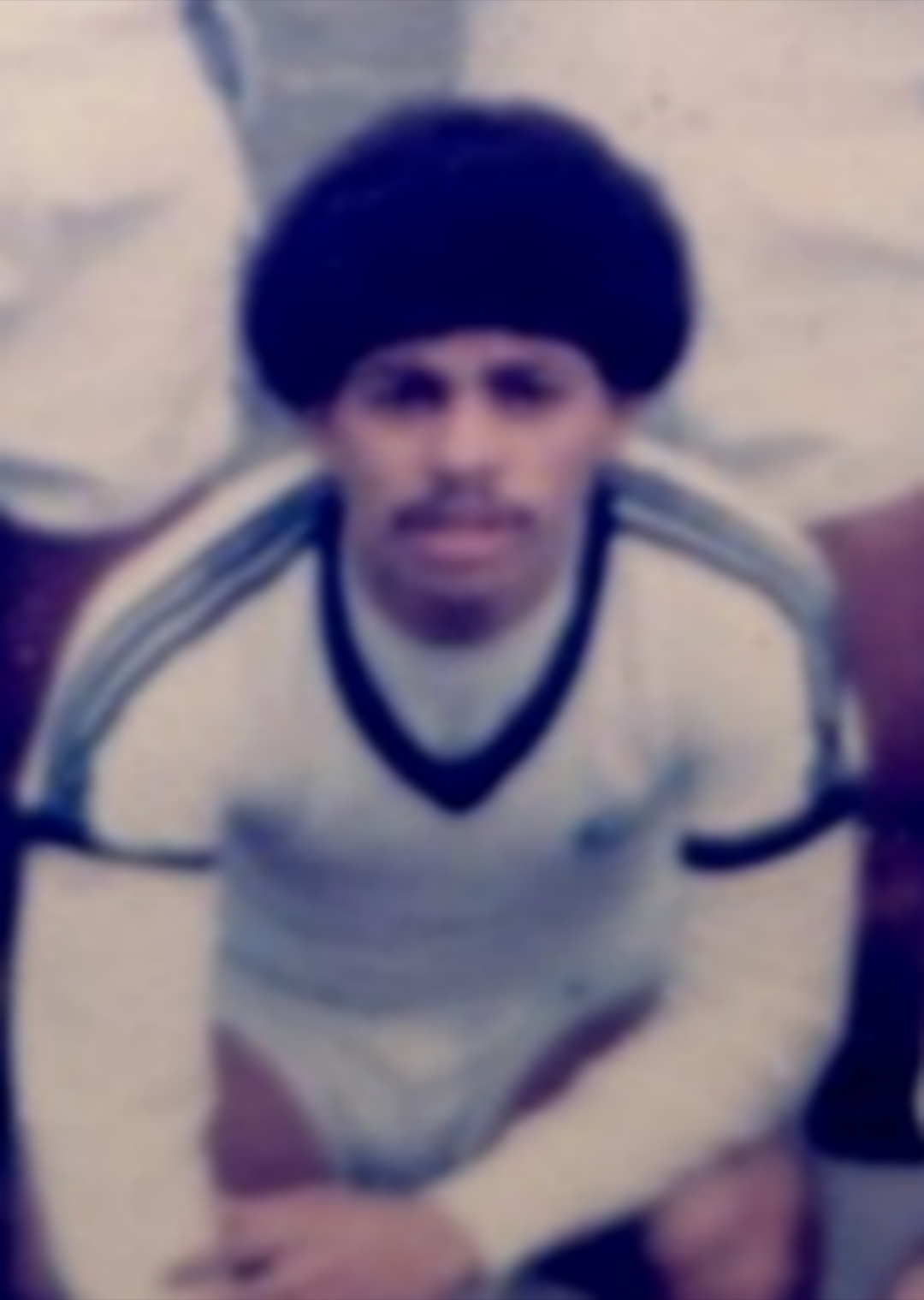
- Wahid with Pakistan at the 1986 Fajr International Tournament

Personal information
- Full name: Abdul Wahid
- Date of birth: 9 October 1965
- Place of birth: Karachi, Pakistan
- Position: Midfielder

Senior career*
Years	Team	Apps	(Gls)
1983–1989	Pakistan Airlines		

International career
1984–1989	Pakistan		
- * Club domestic league appearances and goals

Abdul Wahid (Urdu: عبدالواحد; born 9 October 1965), also known as Abdul Wahid Jr., (Note: differentiating him from Abdul Wahid Sr., another player with a similar name who represented Pakistan and PIA in the early 1980s.) is a Pakistani former footballer who played as a midfielder. Wahid has been considered one of the prominent midfielders to play for Pakistan in the 1980s, and was part of the national team as vice captain which won the 1989 South Asian Games.

== Early life ==
Wahid was born on 9 October 1965, in Karachi, Pakistan.

== Club career ==
Wahid played for Pakistan Airlines throughout his career. In 1985, He played in the National Youth Football Championship.

== International career ==
Wahid was first selected for Pakistan at the 1984 Merdeka Tournament, and was also part of the squad for the 1984 AFC Asian Cup qualification held in Calcutta, India. The next year, he featured in the 1985 Quaid-e-Azam International Tournament, and also played in the latter editions in 1986 and 1987. He also represented Pakistan in the 1986 Asian Games, as well as the 1986 Fajr International Tournament. He continued to play for Pakistan in the 1987 South Asian Games, and the 1988 AFC qualifiers. He was a starting player at the 1990 FIFA World Cup qualification in the country's first participation in the tournament in 1989. The same year, he helped the national side achieve the gold medal in the 1989 South Asian Games, where he acted as vice captain under Mateen Akhtar. Wahid was also part of the squad as an unused substitute which again won the 1991 South Asian Games.

== Honours ==
=== Pakistan ===
- South Asian Games:
  - Winners (1): 1989
