= 1982 Bangladesh President's Gold Cup =

Tournament details
- Host country: Bangladesh
- Dates: 21–30 August 1982
- Teams: 8 (from 1 confederation)
- Venue: Dhaka Stadium

Final positions
- Champions: (China) Beijing (1st title)
- Runners-up: Thailand Youth
- Third place: Harimau Malaysia

Tournament statistics
- Matches played: 15
- Goals scored: 32 (2.13 per match)
- Top scorer(s): (South Korea) Yung Kook (Malaysia) Hasimuddin (3 goals)
- Best player: (China) Yu Jinglian

The 1982 Bangladesh President's Gold Cup was the second edition of the Bangladesh President's Gold Cup. The event was held at the Dhaka Stadium in Dhaka, Bangladesh.

== Venues ==
Dhaka	1982 Bangladesh President's Gold Cup is located in Bangladesh
Dhaka Stadium	1982 Bangladesh President's Gold Cup is located in Bangladesh
Capacity: 36,000	1982 Bangladesh President's Gold Cup is located in Bangladesh

== Group stage ==
=== Group A ===
Pos	Team	Pld	W	D	L	GF	GA	GD	Pts	Qualification
1	(South Korea) Konkuk University	3	3	0	0	5	1	+4	6	Advance to the semi-finals
2	Thailand Youth	3	1	1	1	1	1	0	3	Advance to the semi-finals
3	Iran Youth	3	0	2	1	1	3	−2	2	
4	Bangladesh Red	3	0	1	2	0	2	−2	1	

Source: RSSSF
21 August 1982

Bangladesh Red	0–0	Iran Youth
	Report

Dhaka Stadium, Dhaka

23 August 1982

Konkuk University (South Korea)	1–0	Bangladesh Red
Yung Kook 57'	Report

Dhaka Stadium, Dhaka

24 August 1982

Thailand Youth	0–0	Iran Youth
	Report

Dhaka Stadium, Dhaka

25 August 1982

Iran Youth	1–3	(South Korea) Konkuk University
Rezai 63'	Report	Yung Kook 8', 52'; Joo Ki-Yongsoo 84'

Dhaka Stadium, Dhaka

26 August 1982

Konkuk University (South Korea)	1–0	Thailand Youth
Park Ji-Yong Ill 86'	Report

Dhaka Stadium, Dhaka

27 August 1982

Bangladesh Red	0–1	Thailand Youth
	Report	Panomai 70'

Dhaka Stadium, Dhaka
Referee: AM Bhatti (Pakistan)

=== Group B ===
Pos	Team	Pld	W	D	L	GF	GA	GD	Pts	Qualification
1	Harimau Malaysia (Note: The Malaysian FA sent the Harimau Malaysia team to the tournament, a developmental team of young Malaysian players.)	3	2	1	0	5	1	+4	5	Advance to the semi-finals
2	(China) Beijing	3	2	0	1	6	1	+5	4	Advance to the semi-finals
3	Bangladesh Green	3	1	1	1	2	3	−1	3	
4	Pakistan	3	0	0	3	2	10	−8	0	

Source: RSSSF
22 August 1982

Bangladesh Green	0–0	Harimau Malaysia
	Report

Dhaka Stadium, Dhaka

23 August 1982

Beijing (China)	4–0	Pakistan
Jang Di Ping 17'; Ji Jing Lian 18'; Luki Yang Bin 40'; Yang Chaohui 53'	Report

Dhaka Stadium, Dhaka

24 August 1982

Beijing (China)	2–0	Bangladesh Green
Liu Lifu 37'; Li Gongi 77'	Report

Dhaka Stadium, Dhaka

25 August 1982

Harimau Malaysia	4–1	Pakistan
Nuruddin Osman 4', 35'; Nasir Yusuf 22'; Hasimuddin 36'	Report	Zulfiqar 84'

Dhaka Stadium, Dhaka

26 August 1982

Beijing (China)	0–1	Harimau Malaysia
	Report	Hasimuddin 35'

Dhaka Stadium, Dhaka

27 August 1982

Bangladesh Green	2–1 (Note: RSSSF misreported the scoreline as 2–0)	Pakistan
Badal 57'; Jahangir Hossain 59'	Report	Sarwar 39'

Dhaka Stadium, Dhaka
Referee: Penon (Thailand)

== Knockout stage ==
=== Semi-finals ===
28 August 1982

Beijing (China)	2–0	(South Korea) Konkuk University
Go Dakowan 29'; Yung Kook 57' (o.g.)	Report

Dhaka Stadium, Dhaka

28 August 1982

Thailand Youth	2–1	Harimau Malaysia
Chairat Sidikool 6'; Pengli 78'	Report	Hasimuddin 86'

Dhaka Stadium, Dhaka

=== Third-place ===
30 August 1982

Harimau Malaysia	1–0	(South Korea) Konkuk University
Nasir Yusuf 13'	Report

Dhaka Stadium, Dhaka

=== Final ===
30 August 1982

Beijing (China)	4–0	Thailand Youth
Go Dakowan 14'; Li Gongi 58'; Liu Lifu 60'; Yu Jinglian 68'	Report

Dhaka Stadium, Dhaka
Referee: Munir Hossain (Bangladesh)

== Statistics ==
=== Goalscorers ===
There were 32 goals scored in 15 matches, for an average of 2.13 goals per match.

3 goals

- (South Korea) Yung Kook
- (Malaysia) Hasimuddin

2 goals

- (China) Go Dakowan
- (Malaysia) Nasir Yusuf
- (Malaysia) Nuruddin Osman
- (China) Li Gongi
- (China) Liu Lifu
- (Thailand) Panomai

1 goal

- (China) Yu Jing Lian
- (Pakistan) Ghulam Sarwar
- (Bangladesh) Jahangir Hossain
- (Bangladesh) Badal Roy
- (Pakistan) Muhammad Zulfiqar
- (China) Jang Di Ping
- (China) Ji Jing Lian
- (China) Luki Yang Bin
- (China) Yang Chaohui
- (China) Jang Di Ping
- (South Korea) Joo Ki-Yongsoo
- (South Korea) Park Ji-Yong Ill
- (Iran) Rezai

1 own goal

- (South Korea) Yung Kook (against Beijing)
