= Timur Segizbayev =

Kazakhstani football manager

Personal information
- Full name: Temir Sanzharuly Segizbayev
- Date of birth: 12 May 1941
- Place of birth: Kazakh SSR, Soviet Union
- Date of death: 15 December 2017 (aged 76)
- Place of death: Kazakhstan
- Position: Midfielder

Senior career*
Years	Team	Apps	(Gls)
1958–1959	FC Ordabasy		
1960–1970	FC Kairat	213+	(19+)

Managerial career
- 1971: FC Kaisar
- 1971-1972: FC Shakhter Karagandy
- 1973-1979: FC Kairat
- 1979-1982: South Yemen
- 1983: FC Kaisar
- 1986-1988: FC Kairat
- * Club domestic league appearances and goals

Temir Sanzharuly Segizbayev (Kazakh: Темір Санжарұлы Сегізбаев, romanized: Temır Sanjarūly Segızbaev; 12 May 1941 – 15 December 2017) was a Soviet and Kazakh football manager.

== Career ==
While manager of the South Yemen national team, he installed the first stadium in the country with natural grass, allowing them to compete in the World Cup qualifiers.

After the fall of the USSR, he unsuccessfully attempted to establish a Central Asian League.
