= János Kuszmann =

Hungarian footballer

József Kuzman
Personal information
- Full name: József Kuzman
- Date of birth: 3 December 1938 (age 87)
- Place of birth: Budapest, Hungary
- Position: Defender

Senior career*
Years	Team	Apps	(Gls)
–	MTK Budapest		
–1958	Wiener Sport-Club		
1958–1964	Real Betis	87	(13)
1964–1965	Espanyol	22	(2)
1965–1966	Castilla		
1966–1967	Beşiktaş	21	(8)
1967	Philadelphia Spartans	2	(1)
1968	Cleveland Stokers	15	(2)
1968–1969	Beşiktaş	15	(1)
1969–1970	Boluspor	24	(3)
1970–1971	Panachaiki		
- * Club domestic league appearances and goals

József Kuzman (born 3 December 1938), also known as Joe Erwin Kuzman, is a former football defender who played in Hungary, Spain, Turkey, the United States and Greece.

== Career ==
Born in Budapest, Kuszmann started playing football for local side MTK Budapest FC. He would spend most of his career playing abroad, beginning in Austria with Wiener Sport-Club. Next he moved to Spain, where he spent eight seasons playing in La Liga for Real Betis and RCD Espanyol.

In 1967, Kuszmann moved to Turkey, joining Süper Lig side Beşiktaş J.K. He made 21 appearances and scored 8 goals as the club won the league. A brief stint in the United States followed, playing for Philadelphia Spartans and Cleveland Stokers. He returned to Turkey to play for Beşiktaş during the 1968–69 season. The following season, he played in the second division with Boluspor, and then moved to Greece to finish his career at Panachaiki.
