= Muhammad Zulfiqar =

Pakistani footballer

Personal information
- Date of birth: 1957 (age 68–69)
- Place of birth: Pakistan
- Position: Midfielder

Senior career*
Years	Team	Apps	(Gls)
- Pakistan Airlines

International career
1982	Pakistan Blues	6	(2)
1981–1985	Pakistan		
- * Club domestic league appearances and goals

Muhammad Zulfiqar (Urdu: محمد ذوالفقار; born 1957) also known as Zulfiqar Mangu, is a Pakistani former footballer who played as a midfielder. Zulfiqar served as captain of the Pakistan national football team in 1984 and 1985.

== Club career ==
Zulfiqar started playing football at college where he eventually became captain. He was later selected for the Pakistan Airlines football team, where he won the National Football Championship several times.

== International career ==
Zulfiqar was first selected for the Pakistan national football team in 1981, when the team toured Burma and later played at the 1981 King's Cup in Thailand. The next year, he played for the second string Pakistan Blues team at the 1982 Quaid-e-Azam International Tournament, scoring 2 goals in the tournament against Bangladesh and Iran.

In August 1984, Zulfiqar was selected captain of the Pakistan national team at the age of 27, for the 1984 Merdeka Tournament in Malaysia. The same year, he captained the team at the 1984 AFC Asian Cup qualification in Calcutta, India. He last played with the national team at the 1985 Quaid-e-Azam International Tournament held in Peshawar.

== See also ==
- List of Pakistan national football team captains
