= Anton Silva =

Sri Lankan footballer

Personal information
- Full name: Anton D'Silva
- Date of birth: October 28, 1964 (age 61)
- Place of birth: Colombo, Sri Lanka
- Position: Striker

Senior career*
Years	Team	Apps	(Gls)
1988–1989	Renown SC		
1994–1995	Renown SC		
1998–1999	Indian Bank		

International career
1996	Sri Lanka	2	(1)
- * Club domestic league appearances and goals

Anton Silva (born October 28, 1964) is a former Sri Lankan professional footballer who played as a striker and represented Sri Lanka national football team in 1996 and 1997.

== International career ==
Silva included in the national team in 1996 and debuted against India and Qatar in two matches corresponding to the World Cup 1998 Qualifiers.

== International goals ==
#	Date	Venue	Opponent	Score	Result	Competition
1	24 September 1996	Khalifa Stadium, Doha, Qatar	India	1–0	1–1	World Cup 1998 Qualifying
