= Abdul Ghafoor Ajiz =

Pakistani former footballer

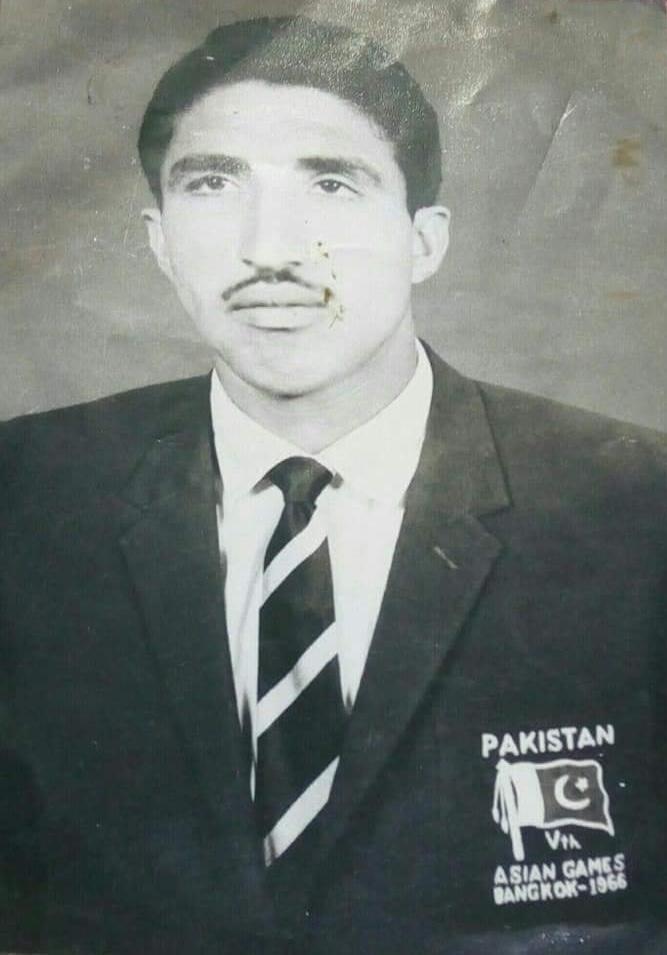
- Ghafoor in 1966

Personal information
- Full name: Abdul Ghafoor Khan Khalil
- Place of birth: Peshawar, Pakistan
- Position: Right winger

Senior career*
Years	Team	Apps	(Gls)
??–1979	Warsak		
1979–??	National Bank		

International career
1974	Pakistan		
- * Club domestic league appearances and goals

Abdul Ghafoor Khan Khalil (Urdu: عبدالغفور خان خلیل), known by his nickname Ajiz, is a Pakistani former footballer who played as a right winger. He represented the Pakistan national football team in the 1960s and 1970s.

== Club career ==
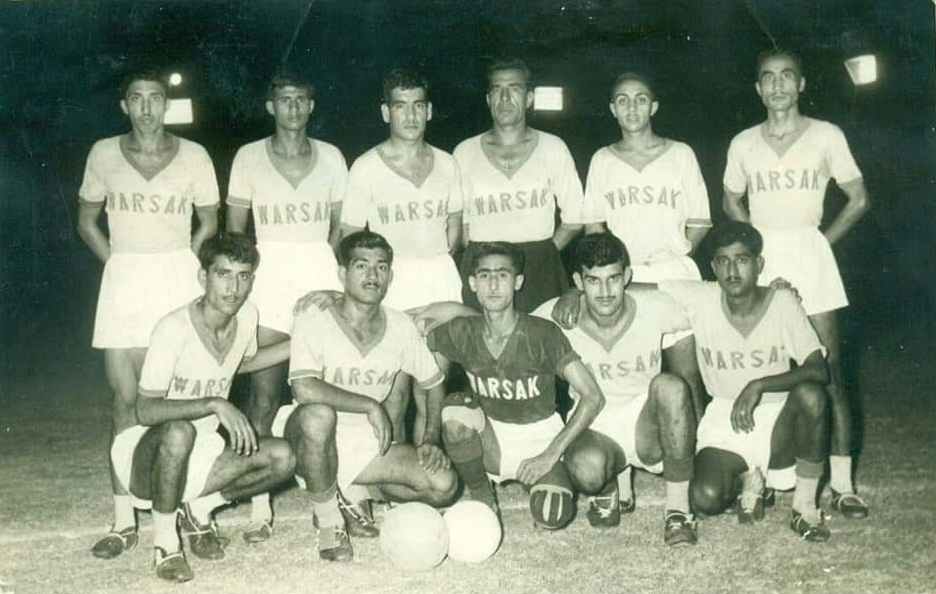
Ghafoor standing far left with Warsak at the 1963 Ismail Gold Shield Tournament

Ghafoor played for Peshawar based Warsak football team throughout his career, and represented Peshawar Division at the National Football Championship, guiding the team to the title in 1968. He played for Warsak in several editions of the Aga Khan Gold Cup, helping the team passing the qualifying stage. On 12 March 1967, he scored a brace for Peshawar Division in an exhibition match against the Pakistan national team in the eventual 2–6 defeat. He also represented Peshawar Division at the 1970 edition of the Aga Khan Gold Cup.

In 1979, he became affiliated with the National Bank departmental team.

== International career ==
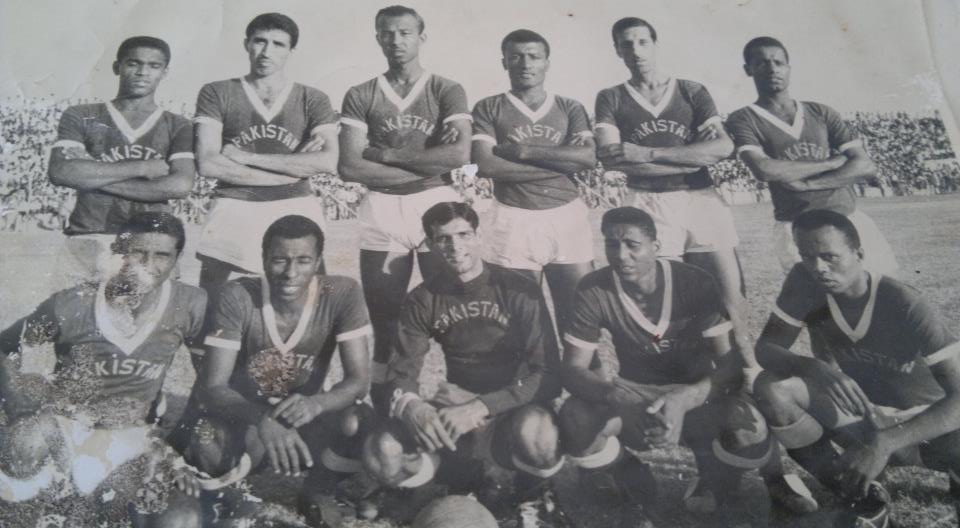
Ghafoor standing second from left with Pakistan in 1966 against Alga

In November 1966, Ghafoor was selected for the Pakistan national team for the 1966 Asian Games. However Pakistan did not participate in the tournament due to financial restrictions. In late 1966, Ghafoor featured as regular starter for the matches against the touring Soviet side Alga.

He later played at the 1974 RCD Cup held in Karachi, and the 1974 Asian Games held in Tehran.

== Post-retirement ==
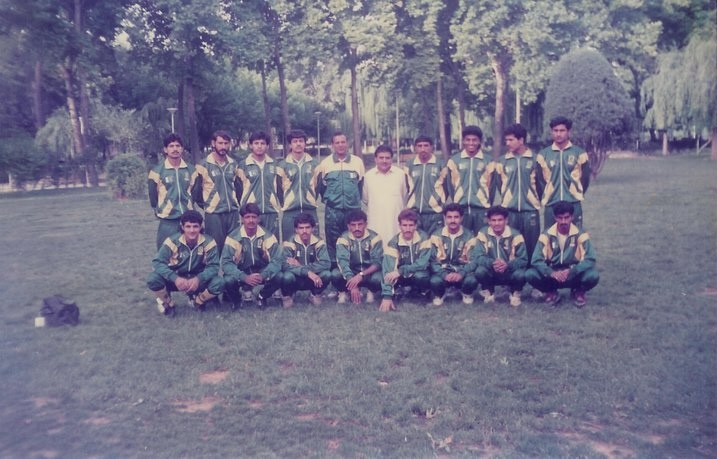
Ghafoor standing seventh from left as assistant coach of Pakistan A at the 1993 ECO Cup

In June 1993, the Pakistan Football Federation sent an alternate team, designated as "Pakistan A", to the 1993 ECO Cup held in Tehran, Iran, while the main national team was participating in the 1994 FIFA World Cup qualifiers. Ghafoor served as assistant coach of the ECO Cup squad, along with former international Muhammad Latif with him as head coach, while the main national team at the World Cup qualifiers was led by Muhammad Aslam Japani.

In the 2010s, he served as member of the selection committee of the Khyber Pakhtunkhwa Football Association.

== Honours ==
Peshawar Division

- National Football Championship: 1968
