= Railway Stadium, Lahore =

Association football stadium in Lahore, Pakistan

Railway Stadium
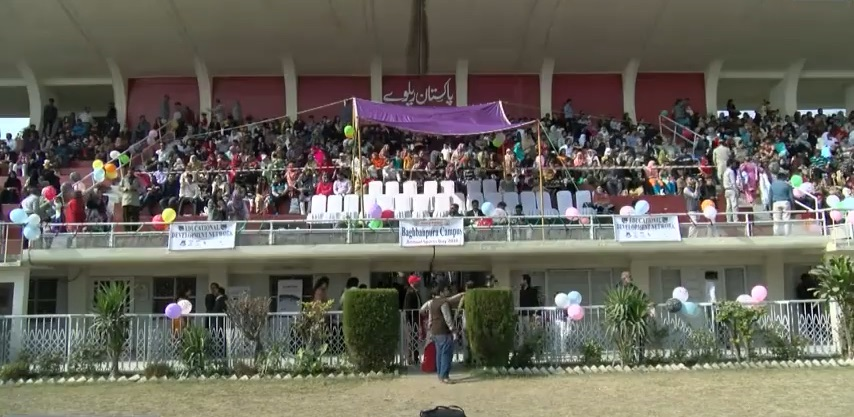
- Interactive map of Railway Stadium
- Location: Garhi Shahu, Lahore, Punjab, Pakistan
- Coordinates: 31°34′N 74°21′E
- Owner: Pakistan Railways Sports Board
- Capacity: 5,000
- Surface: Natural Grass

Construction
- Opened: 18 March 1932; 94 years ago

Tenants
- Pakistan Railways FC (1932–present); Pakistan national football team (1987–1997)

Railway Stadium is a multi-purpose stadium in Garhi Shahu, Lahore, Pakistan. It is currently used mostly for football matches and serves as the home venue for the Pakistan Railways football team, and was one of the primary venues for the Pakistan national football team in the 1990s. The stadium can accommodate around 5,000 spectators. It is owned by the Pakistan Railways Sports Board. Built and opened in 1932, it is the oldest stadium in the city of Lahore.

== History ==
Built and opened as a multi-purpose stadium in 1932, it is the oldest stadium in the city of Lahore. The opening ceremony of the stadium was held on Friday, 18 March 1932.

In the 1990s the Railway Stadium served as one of the primary venues for the Pakistan national football team, until eventually being replaced by the bigger and more advanced Peoples Football Stadium in Karachi and Punjab Stadium in Lahore.

In 1987, the stadium hosted the 1987 Quaid-e-Azam International Tournament as well as the inaugural 1993 SAARC Gold Cup, which was the first edition of the eventually renamed SAFF Championship. It was also the home venue during the 1998 FIFA World Cup qualification for Pakistan.

Apart from being one of the main venues of several national football events such as the Pakistan Premier League and the PFF National Challenge Cup, the stadium was chosen as one of the venues, along with Punjab Stadium, in the 2007 AFC President's Cup held in Lahore.

== Football tournaments ==
=== 1987 Quaid-e-Azam International Tournament ===
The stadium was the venue for the 1987 Quaid-e-Azam International Tournament.

Date	Team #1	Res.	Team #2	Round	Attendance
15 September 1987	Pakistan Whites	1–0	(Pakistan) Pakistan Blues	Group stage	N/A
16 September 1987	(China) Guangzhou	4–0	Nepal	Group stage	N/A
17 September 1987	Nepal XI	0–2	Pakistan Whites	Group stage	N/A
17 September 1987	(China) Guangzhou	2–1	Pakistan Greens	Group stage	N/A
18 September 1987	Nepal XI	0–2	Bangladesh XI	Group stage	N/A
18 September 1987	(Maldives) Victory Sports Club	2–0	Pakistan Yellows	Group stage	N/A
19 September 1987	Pakistan Whites	1–1	Bangladesh XI	Group stage	N/A
19 September 1987	Pakistan Greens	4–0	Pakistan Yellows	Group stage	N/A
20 September 1987	Nepal XI	0–1	(Pakistan) Pakistan Blues	Group stage	N/A
20 September 1987	(China) Guangzhou	4–0	(Maldives) Victory Sports Club	Group stage	N/A
21 September 1987	(Pakistan) Pakistan Blues	0–0	Bangladesh XI	Group stage	N/A
21 September 1987	Pakistan Greens	4–0	(Maldives) Victory Sports Club	Group stage	N/A
22 September 1987	Pakistan Greens	0–1	Pakistan Whites	Semi-finals	N/A
23 September 1987	(China) Guangzhou	2–0	Bangladesh XI	Semi-finals	N/A
24 September 1987	Pakistan Greens	Walkover	Bangladesh XI	Third-place match	N/A
24 September 1987	(China) Guangzhou	3–1	Pakistan Whites	Final	N/A

=== 1993 SAARC Gold Cup ===
The stadium was the venue for the 1993 SAARC Gold Cup.

Date	Team #1	Res.	Team #2	Round	Attendance
16 July 1993	India	2–0	Sri Lanka	Round Robin	N/A
16 July 1993	Pakistan	1–1	Nepal	Round Robin	N/A
17 July 1993	Pakistan Whites	0–0	Nepal	Exhibition match	N/A
18 July 1993	Pakistan Whites	1–3	India	Exhibition match	N/A
18 July 1993	Pakistan	0–4	Sri Lanka	Round Robin	N/A
19 July 1993	Sri Lanka	0–0	Nepal	Round Robin	N/A
20 July 1993	Pakistan Whites	0–2	Pakistan	Exhibition match	N/A
21 July 1993	India	1–0	Nepal	Round Robin	N/A
22 July 1993	Pakistan Whites	1–2	Sri Lanka	Exhibition match	N/A
23 July 1993	Pakistan	1–1	India	Round Robin	N/A

== See also ==
- List of stadiums in Pakistan
