= 1986 Quaid-e-Azam International Tournament =

Tournament details
- Host country: Pakistan
- Dates: 25 April–2 May 1986
- Teams: 6 (from 1 confederation)
- Venue: Jinnah Sports Stadium

Final positions
- Champions: China (1st title)
- Runners-up: Pakistan Greens
- Third place: South Korea Works Selection

Tournament statistics
- Matches played: 15
- Goals scored: 58 (3.87 per match)

The 1986 Quaid-e-Azam International Tournament was the fourth edition of the Quaid-e-Azam International Tournament. The event was held at the Jinnah Sports Stadium in Islamabad, Pakistan.

== Overview ==
The fourth edition of the Quaid-e-Azam International Tournament commenced on 25 April 1986 at Jinnah Stadium in Islamabad. The competition featured six teams, including two from the host nation, Pakistan Greens which was the national team, and Pakistan Whites which was the B team. The national teams of China, Nepal, and Sri Lanka also participated, with the exception of South Korea, which was represented by a works selection composed of players from the country’s semi-professional employer-backed clubs.

The tournament kicked off with Pakistan Greens securing a 1–0 victory over Sri Lanka in a rain-affected match played under floodlights. The winning goal came in the 65th minute from Ghulam Sarwar Teddy, who finished a move initiated from the right wing. Later that day, China defeated Nepal 5–0. Chinese forward Liu Haiguang netted twice in quick succession before halftime. In the second half, substitute Li Zhonghua, who replaced Li Hui, added a third, while Chen Dong contributed two more goals to seal the win.

On the second day of competition, Pakistan Greens recorded a narrow 1–0 win over the South Korean team, with Ghulam Sarwar again on the scoresheet in the 30th minute. Meanwhile, China continued their strong form with a 7–0 win over Pakistan Whites.

South Korea bounced back on the third day by defeating Pakistan Whites 4–0, all goals scored by Oh Suk Jae, marking the tournament's first hat-trick. In a parallel fixture, Sri Lanka surrendered a two-goal lead to settle for a 2–2 draw with Nepal.

China maintained their winning streak with a 3–0 triumph over Pakistan Greens on 29 April, exerting constant pressure and entering halftime with a two-goal lead. In contrast, Sri Lanka mounted a comeback to edge Pakistan Whites 3–2 after trailing 0–2 at the break.

The South Korean team secured a 5–0 win over Nepal the following day. They led 2–0 at halftime and added three more in the second period, with goals from Kim Hyun (2), Choi Teng Kab, Lee Chil Sung, and Lee Young Jai.

On 2 May, China recorded their fourth consecutive win by defeating Sri Lanka 3–0. Goals were scored by Shen Xiangfu, Liu Haiguang, and Chen Dong. Earlier that day, Nepal registered their only win of the tournament, beating Pakistan Whites 2–0 through goals from Umesh Pardhan and Kedar Manandhar.

China secured the championship title with a 1–1 draw against the South Korean in their final group match. Duan Ju opened the scoring for China in the 11th minute, while Lee Chil Sung equalized in the second half. China topped the standings with an unbeaten record. Pakistan Greens finished as runners-up with eight points after a 5–0 win against Nepal in their final match. Early goals by Pakistani players Ghulam Sarwar Teddy, Muhammad Naveed, Fida Ur Rehman and Abdul Majeed set the tone, and despite Pakistan being reduced to ten men after Zafar Iqbal was sent off by the South Korean referee for a foul in the first half, they maintained dominance. Nepal attempted a comeback in the second half with several attacks, but goalkeeper Jamshed Rana produced key saves. Ghulam Sarwar scored his second, and the last goal of Pakistan in the second half of the match to complete the victory. The South Korean team placed third with seven points.

After the finalisation of the tournament, Habib Bank was chosen to play two exhibition matches against China in 4 May and against Sri Lanka in 5 May at the Ibn-e-Qasim Bagh Stadium in Multan. The team drew by 1–1 in their match against Sri Lanka. In 4 May, the South Korean team was also scheduled to play against a Chakwal XI.

== Venue ==
Islamabad	1986 Quaid-e-Azam International Tournament is located in Pakistan
Jinnah Sports Stadium	1986 Quaid-e-Azam International Tournament is located in Pakistan
Capacity: 40,000	1986 Quaid-e-Azam International Tournament is located in Pakistan

== Results ==
Pos	Team	Pld	W	D	L	GF	GA	GD	Pts	Final result
1	China	5	4	1	0	19	1	+18	9	Champions
2	Pakistan Greens	5	4	0	1	14	3	+11	8	
3	South Korea Works Selection	5	3	1	1	14	2	+12	7	
4	Sri Lanka	5	1	1	3	5	12	−7	3	
5	Nepal	5	1	1	3	4	17	−13	3	
6	Pakistan Whites	5	0	0	5	2	23	−21	0	

Source: RSSSF

== Matches ==
25 April 1986

Pakistan Greens	1–0	Sri Lanka
Sarwar 65'	Report

Jinnah Sports Stadium, Islamabad

25 April 1986

China	5–0	Nepal
Liu Haiguang 36', 41'; Li Zhonghua 47'; Chen Dong 67'; Zhao Dayu 80'	Report

Jinnah Sports Stadium, Islamabad

26 April 1986

Pakistan Greens	1–0	South Korea Works Selection
Sarwar 30'	Report

Jinnah Sports Stadium, Islamabad

26 April 1986

Pakistan Whites	0–7	China
	Report

Jinnah Sports Stadium, Islamabad

27 April 1986

Nepal	2–2	Sri Lanka
	Report

Jinnah Sports Stadium, Islamabad

27 April 1986

Pakistan Whites	0–4	South Korea Works Selection
	Report	Oh Seok-jae (?)

Jinnah Sports Stadium, Islamabad

28 April 1986

Pakistan Whites	2–3	Sri Lanka
	Report

Jinnah Sports Stadium, Islamabad

28 April 1986

Pakistan Greens	0–3	China
	Report	Liu Haiguang (?); Li Hui 75'

Jinnah Sports Stadium, Islamabad

29 April 1986

South Korea Works Selection	5–0	Nepal
Choi Jong-gap 16'; Lee Chil-seong (?); Lee Yong-je 50'; Kim Hyeon-oh 69', 73'	Report

Jinnah Sports Stadium, Islamabad

30 April 1986

South Korea Works Selection	4–0	Sri Lanka
	Report

Jinnah Sports Stadium, Islamabad

30 April 1986

Pakistan Greens	7–0	Pakistan Whites
	Report

Jinnah Sports Stadium, Islamabad

1 May 1986

China	3–0	Sri Lanka
Shen Xiangfu 27'; Liu Haiguang 42'; Chen Dong 88'	Report

Jinnah Sports Stadium, Islamabad

1 May 1986

Pakistan Whites	0–2	Nepal
	Report	Umesh Pradhan (?); Kedar Manandhar (?)

Jinnah Sports Stadium, Islamabad

2 May 1986

Pakistan Greens	5–0	Nepal
Ejaz 2'; Naveed 14'; Sarwar 34', 77'; Majeed 41'	Report

Jinnah Sports Stadium, Islamabad

2 May 1986

China	1–1	South Korea Works Selection
Duan Ju 11'	Report	Lee Chil-seong 58'

Jinnah Sports Stadium, Islamabad
