= Ghulam Sarwar Teddy =

Pakistani footballer

Personal information
- Date of birth: 2 February 1962 (age 64)
- Place of birth: Lahore, Pakistan
- Positions: Attacking midfielder; winger

Senior career*
Years	Team	Apps	(Gls)
1977–1978	WAPDA		
1979–1980	Pakistan Army		
1981–1993	Pakistan Airlines		

International career
1984–1992	Pakistan		(6)
- * Club domestic league appearances and goals

Ghulam Sarwar (born 2 February 1962) commonly known as Ghulam Sarwar Teddy, is a Pakistani former footballer who played as an attacking midfielder and winger. Under his captainship, the Pakistan national team retained the gold medal at the 1991 South Asian Games.

== Club career ==
Sarwar started his football career with WAPDA, and later played for Pakistan Army. He also represented Lahore Division team at the National Football Championship.

He then became a part of the Pakistan Airlines football team, for which he was associated with the organisation for the rest of his career. On 26 December 1983, Sarwar also played for the Sindh football team against visiting West Berlin University team from Germany, scoring a goal in the eventual 2–0 victory. In the 1986 Pakistan President's Gold Cup, he played with the President XI team, scoring several goals.

== International career ==
Sarwar made his debut with the Pakistan national football team at the 1982 Bangladesh President's Gold Cup, where he scored a goal against the Bangladesh Green team in a 1–2 defeat.

In the 1986 Quaid-e-Azam International Tournament, he played with the main national team named Pakistan Greens, scoring several goals including against Sri Lanka, a South Korea XI and Nepal, helping the team finish as runners-up behind China. At the 1986 Asian Games, Sarwar scored through a penalty at the 26th minute against Iraq in the eventual 1–5 defeat. He also scored against Japan at the 1988 AFC Asian Cup qualification in the 63rd minute in a 1–5 loss. Sarwar captained the Pakistan national team at the 1991 South Asian Games, where he helped the side reach the final against Maldives, eventually winning by 2–0.

== Post-retirement ==
In 2016, Sarwar became a member of committee consisting of former international footballers, that engages veteran players while also training young footballers. He also served as selector for football teams. In 2024, Sarwar led a meeting in Peshawar aimed to revive veteran football in Pakistan, bringing together former international players from Khyber Pakhtunkhwa.

== Personal life ==
Sarwar came from a family of footballers. His father Ghulam Muhammad Jr. had played football at domestic level in Pakistan. Out of his ten siblings, three of his brothers also represented the Pakistan national team. His oldest brother Ali Asghar played for the Pakistan national team in the 1970s.

== Career statistics ==
=== International goals ===
Scores and results list Pakistan's goal tally first, score column indicates score after each Sarwar goal.

List of international goals scored by Ghulam Sarwar
No.	Date	Venue	Opponent	Score	Result	Competition
1	25 April 1986	Jinnah Sports Stadium, Islamabad	Sri Lanka	1–0	1–0	1986 Quaid-e-Azam International Tournament
2	2 May 1986	Jinnah Sports Stadium, Islamabad	Nepal	3–0	5–0	1986 Quaid-e-Azam International Tournament
3	2 May 1986	Jinnah Sports Stadium, Islamabad	Nepal	5–0	5–0	1986 Quaid-e-Azam International Tournament
4	23 September 1986	Daegu Stadium, Daegu	Iraq	1–2	1–5	1986 Asian Games
5	27 September 1986	Daegu Stadium, Daegu	Oman	1–1	1–3	1986 Asian Games
6	18 April 1988	Kuala Lumpur, Malaysia	Japan	1–2	1–4	1988 AFC Asian Cup qualification

== Honours ==
=== Pakistan Airlines ===
- National Football Championship
  - Champions (3): 1981, 1989, 1992–93
- Inter-Provincial Championship
  - Winners (1): 1984

=== Pakistan ===
- South Asian Games:
  - Winners (1): 1991

== See also ==
- List of Pakistan national football team captains
