= Pakistan national football team results (1950–1989) =

Match results (1950-1989)

The following are the Pakistan national football team results in its official international matches from 1950 to 1989.

== Results ==
Key
| Win |
| Draw |
| Defeat |

=== 1950 ===
| 27 October 1950 Friendly | Iran | 5–1 | Pakistan | Tehran, Iran |
| | Boroumand; Khatami; Shakibi | Report | Wahid | Stadium: Amjadieh Stadium; Attendance: 17,000 |

=== 1952 ===
| 18 March 1952 1952 Asian Quadrangular Football Tournament | Ceylon | 0–2 | Pakistan | Colombo, Ceylon |
| | | Report | Wahid 8'; Kutty 34' | Stadium: Colombo Oval |

| 20 March 1952 1952 Asian Quadrangular Football Tournament | Pakistan | 1–0 | Burma | Colombo, Ceylon |
| | Sharif 45' | Report | | Stadium: Colombo Oval |

| 23 March 1952 1952 Asian Quadrangular Football Tournament | India | 0–0 | Pakistan | Colombo, Ceylon |
| | | Report | | Stadium: Colombo Oval; Attendance: 15,000+ |

| 23 April 1952 Friendly | Pakistan | 0–0 | Iran | Karachi, Pakistan |
| | | Report | | Stadium: YMCA Ground; Attendance: 35,000; Referee: Munshi (Pakistan) |

=== 1953 ===
| 23 October 1953 1953 Asian Quadrangular Football Tournament | India | 1–0 | Pakistan | Rangoon, Burma |
| | D'Souza 59' | Report | | Stadium: Aung San Stadium; Referee: U. Kim Teikh (Myanmar) |

| 28 October 1953 1953 Asian Quadrangular Football Tournament | Burma | 1–1 | Pakistan | Rangoon, Burma |
| | Ba Kyu 60' (pen.) | Report | Jamil 49' | Stadium: Aung San Stadium |

| 2 November 1953 1953 Asian Quadrangular Football Tournament | Pakistan | 6–0 | Ceylon | Rangoon, Burma |
| | Akbar Jan 7'; Jamil 10', 13'; Gunaid 11' (o.g.); Kutty 37', 42' | Report | | Stadium: Aung San Stadium |

| 3 November 1953 Friendly | Pakistan | 1–0 | India | Yangon, Burma |
| | Kutty 65' | Report | | Stadium: Aung San Stadium; Referee: Campbell (IFA) |

=== 1954 ===
| 25 April 1954 Friendly | Singapore | 2–2 | Pakistan | Kallang, Singapore |
| | Bakar (?); Leong (?) | Report | Jamil 58'; Fakhri 80' | Stadium: Jalan Besar Stadium; Attendance: 21,000 |

| 2 May 1954 1954 Asian Games G.S | Singapore | 2–6 | Pakistan | Manila, Philippines |
| | Siang Hock 36', 45' | RSSSF | Jamil 39', 41'; Fakhri 42', 43', 47'; Kutty 52' | Stadium: Rizal Memorial Stadium |

| 5 May 1954 1954 Asian Games G.S | Burma | 2–1 | Pakistan | Manila, Philippines |
| | Samuel 31'; Sein Pe 35' | RSSSF | Fakhri 38' | Stadium: Rizal Memorial Stadium |

| 19 December 1954 1954 Asian Quadrangular Football Tournament | Pakistan | 1–1 | Burma | Calcutta, India |
| | Fakhri 44' | Report | Sein Pe 50' | Stadium: Calcutta FC Ground |

| 21 December 1954 1954 Asian Quadrangular Football Tournament | Pakistan | 2–1 | Ceylon | Calcutta, India |
| | Jamil 46'; Amin 63' | Report | M. Sainoon 1' | Stadium: Calcutta FC Ground |

| 26 December 1954 1954 Asian Quadrangular Football Tournament | India | 3–1 | Pakistan | Calcutta, India |
| | Thapa 48', 70', 71' | Report | Fakhri 57' | Stadium: Calcutta FC Ground; Attendance: 100,000 |

=== 1955 ===
| 17 December 1955 1955 Asian Quadrangular Football Tournament | Pakistan | 4–2 | Burma | Dacca, East Pakistan |
| | Qayyum 10', 50' (pen.), 55' (pen.); Jamil 56' | RSSSF | Bahadur 44'; Kyaw Zan | Stadium: Dacca Stadium |

| 21 December 1955 1955 Asian Quadrangular Football Tournament | Pakistan | 2–1 | Ceylon | Dacca, East Pakistan |
| | Fakhri | RSSSF | Ranasinghe | Stadium: Dacca Stadium |

| 24 December 1955 1955 Asian Quadrangular Football Tournament | Pakistan | 1–2 | India | Dacca, East Pakistan |
| | Fakhri | RSSSF | Banerjee 13'; D'Souza 29' | Stadium: Dacca Stadium; Attendance: 50,000 |

| 25 December 1955 Friendly | Pakistan | 1–0 | India | Dhaka, East Pakistan |
| | Manna | | | Stadium: Dacca Stadium; Attendance: 15,000 |

=== 1956 ===
| 26 August 1956 Friendly | Ceylon | 3–5 | Pakistan | Colombo, Ceylon |
| | Ranasinghe 31' (pen.), 32'; A. Fernando 46' | Report | Qayyum 27', 50' (pen.); Hanif 29'; Talib 34'; Umer 61' | Stadium: Government Services Ground |

| 1 September 1956 Friendly | Ceylon | 2–2 | Pakistan | Colombo, Ceylon |
| | Ranasinghe 20' (pen.); A. Fernando 73' | Report | Talib 50'; Umer 75' | Stadium: Government Services Ground |

| 9 September 1956 Friendly | Singapore | 1–1 | Pakistan | Kallang, Singapore |
| | Radin 18' | Report | Qayyum 42' (pen.) | Stadium: Jalan Besar Stadium; Attendance: 8,503; Referee: Greg De Silva (Malaysia) |

=== 1958 ===
| 14 May 1958 Friendly | Malaya | 4–2 | Pakistan | Kuala Lumpur, Federation of Malaya |
| | Leong 2'; Ghani 7', 23'; Omar 20' | Report | Umer 9'; Chowdhury 66' | Stadium: Merdeka Stadium; Attendance: 6,000; Referee: Lam Thiam Yoong (Malaya) |

| 17 May 1958 Friendly | Singapore | 4–4 | Pakistan | Kallang, Singapore |
| | Koh 6', 27' (pen.), 71' (pen.); Swee 8' | Report | Umer 4', 64', 69'; Chowdhury 20' | Stadium: Jalan Besar Stadium; Attendance: 8,000 |

| 25 May 1958 1958 Asian Games G.S | South Vietnam | 1–1 | Pakistan | Tokyo, Japan |
| | | RSSSF |

| 27 May 1958 1958 Asian Games G.S | Pakistan | 1–3 | Taiwan | Tokyo, Japan |
| | Umer 2' | Report | Ho Ying Fun 6'; Law Kwok-tai 19'; Mok Chun Wah 64' | Stadium: Korakuen Velodrome; Attendance: 2,000 |

=== 1959 ===
| 22 April 1959 Friendly | Burma | 1–0 | Pakistan | Rangoon, Burma |
| | Siddiq 50' (o.g.) | Report | | Stadium: Aung San Stadium |

| 24 April 1959 Friendly | Burma | 2–3 | Pakistan | Rangoon, Burma |
| | Vernon Stiles 35'; Ni Tut 42' | Report | Umer 9', 60'; Abdullah 38' | Stadium: Aung San Stadium |

| 26 April 1959 Friendly | Burma | 4–2 | Pakistan | Rangoon, Burma |
| | Vernon Stiles 38'; Maung Ko 43', 56', 80' | Report | Myo Aung 17' (o.g.); Jehan 19' | Stadium: Aung San Stadium |

| 28 April 1959 Friendly | Burma | 1–4 | Pakistan | Rangoon, Burma |
| | Bahadur 60' | Report | Saif 15', 30'; Kabir 35'; Yousuf Sr. 36' | Stadium: Aung San Stadium |

| 7 December 1959 1960 AFC Asian Cup qualification | India | 1–0 | Pakistan | Ernakulam, India |
| | D'Souza 40' | Report | | Stadium: Maharaja's College Stadium; Attendance: 30,000 |

| 9 December 1959 1960 AFC Asian Cup qualification | Pakistan | 4–1 | Iran | Ernakulam, India |
| | Umer 21', 35', 37'; Faqir 28' | Report | Haji Mokhtar 10' | Stadium: Maharaja's College Stadium; Attendance: 15,000 |

| 10 December 1959 1960 AFC Asian Cup qualification | Israel | 2–0 | Pakistan | Ernakulam, India |
| | R. Levi 55'; Stelmach 65' | Report | | Stadium: Maharaja's College Stadium; Attendance: 15,000; Referee: P. Chakravarthy (India) |

| 13 December 1959 1960 AFC Asian Cup qualification | India | 0–1 | Pakistan | Ernakulam, India |
| | | Report | Abdullah 53' | Stadium: Maharaja's College Stadium; Attendance: 30,000 |

| 15 December 1959 1960 AFC Asian Cup qualification | Iran | 4–1 | Pakistan | Ernakulam, India |
| | Hajari; Jamali | Report | Qayyum | Stadium: Maharaja's College Stadium; Attendance: 16,000 |

| 17 December 1959 1960 AFC Asian Cup qualification | Pakistan | 2–2 | Israel | Ernakulam, India |
| | Umer 49'; Ghafoor 57' | Report | Menchel 60'; Ratzabi 68' | Stadium: Maharaja's College Stadium; Attendance: 15,000; Referee: A. N. Jayaraman (India) |

=== 1960 ===
| 5 August 1960 1960 Merdeka Tournament G.S. | Pakistan | 7–0 | Thailand | Kuala Lumpur, Federation of Malaya |
| | Moosa 16', 70', 72'; Umer 31', 35'; Qayyum 33' (pen.); Jehan 78' | Report | | Stadium: Stadium Merdeka; Referee: Hong Deok-young (South Korea) |

| 12 August 1960 1960 Merdeka Tournament G.S. | Malaya | 1–0 | Pakistan | Kuala Lumpur, Federation of Malaya |
| | Gabrielle 63' | Report | | Stadium: Stadium Merdeka |

| 14 August 1960 1960 Merdeka Tournament Third place | Indonesia | 4–0 | Pakistan | Kuala Lumpur, Federation of Malaya |
| | Suratmo 51' (pen.), 69', 73'; Timisela 64' | Report | | Stadium: Stadium Merdeka; Referee: Hong Bark-Young (South Korea) |

| 18 August 1960 Friendly | South Vietnam | 2–2 | Pakistan | Kallang, Singapore |
| | Irshad (?); Ronn 83' | Report | Qayyum 1'; Moosa (?) | Stadium: Jalan Besar Stadium |

| 19 August 1960 Friendly | Singapore | 4–1 | Pakistan | Kallang, Singapore |
| | Omar 20', 37' (pen.); Hussein 48'; Mansor 58' | Report | Rabbani 32' | Stadium: Jalan Besar Stadium |

| 21 August 1960 Friendly | Indonesia | 5–2 | Pakistan | Jakarta, Indonesia |
| | Timisela 8'; own goal 16'; Suratmo 34' (pen.) 63'; Pietje Timisela 50' | Report | Kabir (?); Moosa (?) | Stadium: Ikada Stadium |

=== 1961 ===
| 18 January 1961 Friendly | Pakistan | 1–3 | Burma | Dhaka, East Pakistan |
| | Jehan 35' | Report | Ko Ko Gyi 9'; Bahadur 10', 57' | Attendance: 50,000; Referee: Masudur Rahman (Pakistan) |

| 20 January 1961 Friendly | Pakistan | 4–0 | Burma | Dhaka, East Pakistan |
| | Jehan 26'; Abbas 35', 83'; Moosa 75' | Report | | Attendance: 20,000; Referee: Masudur Rahman (Pakistan) |

| 27 January 1961 Friendly | Pakistan | 1–1 | Burma | Chittagong, East Pakistan |
| | Abbas (~47) | Report | Ko Ko Gyi 45' | Stadium: Niaz Stadium; Referee: Md. Islam |

=== 1962 ===
| 8 September 1962 1962 Merdeka Tournament G.S | Pakistan | 1–0 | Burma | Kuala Lumpur, Federation of Malaya |
| | Jehan 44' | Report | | Stadium: Stadium Merdeka |

| 12 September 1962 1962 Merdeka Tournament G.S | Pakistan | 1–1 | Japan | Kuala Lumpur, Federation of Malaya |
| | Moosa 29' | Report | Yaegashi 42' | Stadium: Stadium Merdeka |

| 16 September 1962 1962 Merdeka Tournament G.S | Malaya | 0–0 | Pakistan | Kuala Lumpur, Federation of Malaya |
| | | Report | | Stadium: Stadium Merdeka |

| 20 September 1962 1962 Merdeka Tournament Final | Indonesia | 2–1 | Pakistan | Kuala Lumpur, Federation of Malaya |
| | Hajah 35'; Timisela 36' | Report | Moosa 28' | Stadium: Stadium Merdeka |

=== 1963 ===
| 26 January 1963 Friendly | Pakistan | 0–0 | China | Dacca, East Pakistan |
| | | RSSSF | | Stadium: Dacca Stadium |

| 30 January 1963 Friendly | Pakistan | 3–2 | China | Peshawar, Pakistan |
| | Yousuf Sr. 5' (?); Umer | Report | Yunshan Sun 83' (pen.), 86' | Stadium: Peshawar Stadium; Attendance: 15,000 |

| 3 February 1963 Friendly | Pakistan | 1–1 | China | Lahore, Pakistan |
| | Yousuf Sr. 85' | Report | Zhang Kunyue 19' | Stadium: Lahore Stadium |

| 7 February 1963 Friendly | Pakistan | 0–2 | China | Karachi, Pakistan |
| | | Report | Zhang Kunyue 35'; Chen Jiagen 41' | Stadium: National Stadium; Referee: Bahadur Khan (Pakistan) |

| 4 October 1963 1964 Summer Olympics qualification | Iran | 4–1 | Pakistan | Tehran, Iran |
| | Shahrokhi 20'; Shirzadegan 23' (pen.); Behzadi 65', 70' | Report | Abbas 14' | Stadium: Amjadieh Stadium, Tehran; Attendance: 25,000; Referee: Khachator Hakat (Lebanon) |

| 3 November 1963 1964 Summer Olympics qualification | Pakistan | 1–0 | Iran | Lahore, Pakistan |
| | Jehangir Khan 70' | Report | | Stadium: Lahore Stadium; Attendance: 15,000; Referee: Liknakamik (Thailand) |

=== 1964 ===
| 3 October 1964 Friendly | China | 0–2 | Pakistan | Beijing, China |
| | | Report | Saleem 11'; Ghafoor 41' | Stadium: Workers' Stadium; Attendance: 80,000 |

=== 1965 ===
| 28 February 1965 Friendly | Ceylon | 3–1 | Pakistan | Colombo, Ceylon |
| | Amidon 44' de Silva 60'; Zainulabdeen 94' | Report | Umer 19' | Stadium: Sugathadasa Stadium; Attendance: 40,000; Referee: T.B. Bongso (Sri Lanka) |

| 7 March 1965 Friendly | Ceylon | 0–0 | Pakistan | Colombo, Ceylon |
| | | Report | | Stadium: Sugathadasa Stadium |

| 21 July 1965 1965 RCD Cup | Turkey | 3–1 | Pakistan | Tehran, Iran |
| | Ogün 5', 32'; Gürsel 18' | Report | Saleem 80' | Stadium: Amjadiyeh Stadium; Referee: Said Sadri (Islamic Republic of Iran) |

| 23 July 1965 1965 RCD Cup | Iran | 4–1 | Pakistan | Tehran, Iran |
| | Arab 17'; Jabbari 20'; Behzadi 70', 79' | Report | Umer 88' | Stadium: Amjadiyeh Stadium; Attendance: 27,000; Referee: Paru (Turkey) |

=== 1967 ===
| 18 March 1967 Friendly | Pakistan | 3–1 | Saudi Arabia | Lyallpur, Pakistan |
| | Moosa 10', 35' (?) | Report | Mubark 65' | Stadium: Lyallpur Stadium; Referee: Sheikh Shaheb Ali (Pakistan) |

| 21 March 1967 Friendly | Pakistan | 2–4 | Saudi Arabia | Sukkur, Pakistan |
| | Bakhsh; Abdullah | Report | Ghorab; Mubark; Kadour | Stadium: Sukkur Municipal Stadium; Referee: Rifat Ullah Khan (Pakistan) |

| 25 March 1967 Friendly | Pakistan | 2–2 | Saudi Arabia | Hyderabad, Pakistan |
| | Pratap (?); Ghafoor 8' | Report | Ghorab 37' (?) | Stadium: Niaz Stadium; Referee: Fazal Akbar (Pakistan) |

| 29 March 1967 Friendly | Pakistan | 1–1 | Saudi Arabia | Karachi, Pakistan |
| | Qadir 23' | Report | Ghorab 13' | Stadium: KMC Stadium; Referee: Jan Mohammad (Pakistan) |

| 13 November 1967 1968 AFC Asian Cup qualification | Cambodia | 1–0 | Pakistan | Rangoon, Burma |
| | Sieng Tara 80' (pen.) | Report | | Stadium: Aung San Stadium |

| 15 November 1967 1968 AFC Asian Cup qualification | Pakistan | 1–1 | India | Rangoon, Burma |
| | Bakhsh 50' | Report | Chatterjee 1' | Stadium: Aung San Stadium |

| 19 November 1967 1968 AFC Asian Cup qualification | Burma | 2–0 | Pakistan | Rangoon, Burma |
| | Bahadur 61'; Kyi 83' | Report | | Stadium: Aung San Stadium |

| 25 November 1967 1967 RCD Cup | Iran | 2–0 | Pakistan | Dacca, East Pakistan |
| | Esmaili 35'; Behzadi 65' | Report | | Stadium: Dacca Stadium; Attendance: 5,000 |

| 28 November 1967 1967 RCD Cup | Turkey | 7–4 | Pakistan | Dacca, East Pakistan |
| | Zemzem 4', 6'; Acuner 32', 80'; Altıparmak 34'; Elmastaşoğlu 40'; Sarıalioğlu 60' | Report | Aslam 53'; Jabbar 79', 87', 89' | Stadium: Dacca Stadium; Attendance: 55,000; Referee: Orhan Gönül (Turkey) |

=== 1969 ===
| 10 March 1969 1969 Friendship Cup | Pakistan | 2–1 | Iraq | Tehran, Iran |
| | Nawaz 59'; Jabbar 90' | Report | Yousif 57' | Stadium: Amjadieh Stadium; Attendance: 7,000; Referee: Arshad Barazandeh (Iran) |

| 12 March 1969 1969 Friendship Cup | Iran | 9–1 | Pakistan | Tehran, Iran |
| | Jabbari 26', 32', 39'; Vafakhah 30', 34'; Mostafavi 48'; Sharafi 55'; Ghelichkhani 60' (pen.); Mansour Zarabi 62' | Report | Dar 61' | Stadium: Amjadieh Stadium; Attendance: 15,000; Referee: Davoud Heydari (Iran) |

| 13 September 1969 1969 RCD Cup | Iran | 4–2 | Pakistan | Ankara, Turkey |
| | Kalani 9', 14'; Mazloumi 47', 67' | Report | Dar 75'; Akbar 78' | Stadium: Ankara 19 Mayıs Stadium; Attendance: 7,000; Referee: Bagatter (Turkey) |

| 14 September 1969 1969 RCD Cup | Turkey | 4–2 | Pakistan | Ankara, Turkey |
| | Zemzem 17'; Bartu 44', 65'; Sarıalioğlu 75' | Report | Aslam 8'; Nawaz 60' | Stadium: Ankara 19 Mayıs Stadium; Referee: Ferdi Ali Donal (Islamic Republic of Iran) |

=== 1970 ===
| 6 September 1970 1970 RCD Cup | Iran | 7–0 | Pakistan | Tehran, Iran |
| | Mehdi Haj Mohamad 13', 90'; Ghelichkhani 33'; Haghverdian 55'; Kalani 57'; Nurunnabi 71' (o.g.); Vafakhah 84' | Report | | Stadium: Amjadiyeh Stadium; Attendance: 20,000 |

=== 1973 ===
| 11 June 1973 Friendly | China | 7–4 | Pakistan | Beijing, China |
| | Zhang Zhongwei 80' | Report | Idrees 70'; Dar 89' | Stadium: Workers' Stadium; Attendance: 80,000 |

=== 1974 ===
| 18 January 1974 1974 RCD Cup | Turkey | 2–2 | Pakistan | Karachi, Pakistan |
| | Atacan 8'; Yalman 49' | TFF | Sarwar 45' (pen.); Nawaz 85' | Stadium: Hockey Stadium; Referee: Mohsen Zamani (Islamic Republic of Iran) |

| 3 September 1974 1974 Asian Games G.S | Iran | 7–0 | Pakistan | Tehran, Iran |
| | Mazloumi 4', 44', 66'; Jabbari 11'; Parvin 28', 55'; Ghelichkhani 88' | Report | | Stadium: Amjadieh Stadium |

| 5 September 1974 1974 Asian Games G.S | Pakistan | 5–1 | Bahrain | Tehran, Iran |
| | Nawaz 11', 44'; Sarwar 17', 83'; Idrees 20' | RSSSF | Bushager 80' | Stadium: Amjadieh Stadium |

| 7 September 1974 1974 Asian Games G.S | Burma | 5–1 | Pakistan | Tehran, Iran |
| | Than Soe; Mya Kyiang; Ye Nyunt | RSSSF | Idrees | Stadium: Aryamehr Stadium |

=== 1976 ===
| 19 July 1976 Afghanistan Republic Day Festival Cup | Pakistan | 0–1 | Afghanistan | Kabul, Afghanistan |
| | | RSSSF | Rohparwar | Stadium: Ghazi Stadium |

| 21 July 1976 Afghanistan Republic Day Festival Cup | Pakistan | 1–1 | India | Kabul, Afghanistan |
| | Unknown | RSSSF | Harjinder Singh | Stadium: Ghazi Stadium |

| 12 October 1976 1976 Quaid-e-Azam International Tournament | Pakistan | 1–0 | Afghanistan | Karachi, Pakistan |
| | Qasim 8' | RSSSF | | Stadium: Hockey Club; Attendance: 5,000; Referee: (Pakistan) S.A. Dara |

=== 1978 ===
| 3 May 1978 1978 Saudi Arabia Football Federation International Tournament | Saudi Arabia | 6–0 | Pakistan | Riyadh, Saudi Arabia |
| | Abdullah (?) | Report |

| 9 May 1978 1978 Saudi Arabia Football Federation International Tournament | Kenya | 8–3 | Pakistan | Riyadh, Saudi Arabia |
| | | Report | Idrees (?); Khalid Iqbal (?) |

=== 1981 ===
| 5 November 1981 Friendly | Burma | 0–0 | Pakistan | Rangoon, Burma |
| | | Report | | Stadium: Aung San Stadium |

| 11 November 1981 1981 King's Cup | Thailand | 1–0 | Pakistan | Bangkok, Thailand |
| | Piyapong 52' (pen.) | Report | | Stadium: National Stadium; Referee: R Balasubramaniam (India) |

| 13 November 1981 1981 King's Cup | Malaysia | 2–3 | Pakistan | Bangkok, Thailand |
| | Napoleon Rozario 38' (pen.); Zainal Abidin 70' | Report | Shah 28', 56', 67' | Stadium: National Stadium; Referee: Udom Anantapong (Thailand) |

| 17 November 1981 1981 King's Cup | Singapore | 0–1 | Pakistan | Bangkok, Thailand |
| | | Report | Shah 9' | Stadium: National Stadium; Referee: J P Coutinho (India) |

=== 1982 ===
| 12 February 1982 1982 Quaid-e-Azam International Tournament | Pakistan | 2–0 | Nepal | Karachi, Pakistan |
| | Shakoor | Report | | Stadium: National Stadium; Referee: (Oman) Mohsen Abdul-Rahman |

| 16 February 1982 1982 Quaid-e-Azam International Tournament | Iran | 1–0 | Pakistan | Karachi, Pakistan |
| | Anjini 7' | Report | | Stadium: National Stadium; Referee: (Oman) Mohsen Abdul-Rahman |

| 18 February 1982 1982 Quaid-e-Azam International Tournament | Pakistan | 2–1 | Bangladesh | Karachi, Pakistan |
| | Naushad | Report | Wasim | Stadium: National Stadium; Referee: (Iran) Behman Bahadur |

| 24 February 1982 1982 Quaid-e-Azam International Tournament | Pakistan | 0–0 | Oman | Karachi, Pakistan |
| | | Report | | Stadium: National Stadium; Referee: (Iran) Behman Bahadur |

=== 1984 ===
| 11 October 1984 1984 AFC Asian Cup qualification | Malaya | 5–0 | Pakistan | Calcutta, India |
| | Zainal Abidin 44', 59'; Nasir 57'; Kim | Report | | Stadium: Salt Lake Stadium |

| 13 October 1984 1984 AFC Asian Cup qualification | South Korea | 6–0 | Pakistan | Calcutta, India |
| | Lee Tae-ho 10'; Choi Sang-gook 15'; Park Sung-hwa (?); Wang Seon-jae (?) | Report | | Stadium: Salt Lake Stadium |

| 15 October 1984 1984 AFC Asian Cup qualification | Pakistan | 4–1 | North Yemen | Calcutta, India |
| | Sharafat 3', 18', 74'; Shahzada 10' | Report | Nasser 7' (pen.) | Stadium: Salt Lake Stadium; Referee: Zhong Bohong (China) |

| 17 October 1984 1984 AFC Asian Cup qualification | India | 2–0 | Pakistan | Calcutta, India |
| | Shabbir Ali 24', 82' | Report | | Stadium: Salt Lake Stadium |

=== 1985 ===
| 30 April 1985 1985 Quaid-e-Azam International Tournament | Pakistan | 1–0 | Nepal | Peshawar, Pakistan |
| | Sharafat | Report | | Stadium: Qayyum Stadium |

| 2 May 1985 1985 Quaid-e-Azam International Tournament | Pakistan | 1–3 | Bangladesh | Peshawar, Pakistan |
| | Sharafat 74' | Report | Roy 12'; Bhadra 41'; Chunnu 88' (pen.) | Stadium: Qayyum Stadium |

| 21 December 1985 1985 South Asian Games G.S | Bangladesh | 2–1 | Pakistan | Dhaka, Bangladesh |
| | Mahfuzul 27', 89' | Report | Ejaz 11' | Stadium: Dhaka Stadium |

| 22 December 1985 1985 South Asian Games G.S | Pakistan | 3–1 | Maldives | Dhaka, Bangladesh |
| | Agha Saeed 18', 44'; Shaukat 39' | Report | Moosa 48' | Stadium: Dhaka Stadium |

| 25 December 1985 1985 South Asian Games Third Place | Pakistan | 2–2 (2–3 p) | Nepal | Dhaka, Bangladesh |
| | Anwar 11'; Saeed 58' | Report | Dhirendra Kumar Pradhan 44'; AMB Mala 83' | Stadium: Dhaka Stadium |
| | Penalties |
| | Agha Saeed (penalty scored); Mukhtar (penalty scored); Nasir Abbas (penalty missed); Zulfiqar Ahmed (penalty missed); Shaukat (penalty missed) | | Mani Shah (penalty scored); Ganesh Pandey (penalty scored); Dhirendra Kumar Pradhan (penalty scored) |

=== 1986 ===
| 16 February 1986 1986 Fajr International Tournament | Iran | 2–0 | Pakistan | Tehran, Iran |
| | Alidoosti 8'; Changiz 16' | Report | | Stadium: Shahid Shiroudi Stadium, Tehran; Attendance: 20000; Referee: Jamshid Nikmehr (IRAN) |

| 15 March 1986 1986 President's Gold Cup International Tournament | Pakistan | 0–1 | Bangladesh | Karachi, Pakistan |
| | | Report | Shimul 85' | Stadium: National Stadium; Referee: Abdul Shakoor Baloch (Pakistan) |

| 25 April 1986 1986 Quaid-e-Azam International Tournament | Pakistan | 1–0 | Sri Lanka | Islamabad, Pakistan |
| | Sarwar 65' | Report | | Stadium: Jinnah Sports Stadium |

| 28 April 1986 1986 Quaid-e-Azam International Tournament | Pakistan | 0–3 | China | Islamabad, Pakistan |
| | | Report | Haiguang (?); Hui 75' | Stadium: Jinnah Sports Stadium |

| 2 May 1986 1986 Quaid-e-Azam International Tournament | Pakistan | 5–0 | Nepal | Islamabad, Pakistan |
| | Ejaz 2'; Naveed 14'; Sarwar 34', 77'; Majeed 41' | Report | | Stadium: Jinnah Sports Stadium |

| 21 September 1986 1986 Asian Games G.S | United Arab Emirates | 1–0 | Pakistan | Daegu, South Korea |
| | Al-Talyani 25' (pen.) | Report | | Stadium: Daegu Stadium |

| 23 September 1986 1986 Asian Games G.S | Pakistan | 1–5 | Iraq | Daegu, South Korea |
| | Sarwar 26' (pen.) | Report | Radhi 14' (pen.), 36'; Hameed 21'; Mohammed 34', 86' | Stadium: Daegu Stadium |

| 27 September 1986 1986 Asian Games G.S | Oman | 3–1 | Pakistan | Daegu, South Korea |
| | Darwish; Amaan; Unknown | Report | Sarwar | Stadium: Daegu Stadium |

| 29 September 1986 1986 Asian Games G.S | Thailand | 6–0 | Pakistan | Daegu, South Korea |
| | Piyapong; Unknown; Unknown | Report | | Stadium: Daegu Stadium |

=== 1987 ===
| 25 April 1987 1988 Summer Olympics Qualification | Nepal | 2–2 | Pakistan | Kathmandu, Nepal |
| | Ghale 2'; Thapa (?) | Report | Sharafat 44', 89' |

| 28 April 1987 1988 Summer Olympics Qualification | Nepal | 1–0 | Pakistan | Kathmandu, Nepal |
| | Pradhan 55' | Report |

| 24 September 1987 1987 Quaid-e-Azam International Tournament | Pakistan | Walkover | Bangladesh | Lahore, Pakistan |
| | | Report | | Stadium: Railway Stadium |

| 21 November 1987 1987 South Asian Games G.S | India | 0–0 | Pakistan | Calcutta, India |
| | | Report | | Stadium: Salt Lake Stadium |

| 22 November 1987 1987 South Asian Games G.S | Pakistan | 1–0 | Maldives | Calcutta, India |
| | Sharafat | Report | | Stadium: Salt Lake Stadium |

| 25 November 1987 1987 South Asian Games Third place | Pakistan | 1–0 | Bangladesh | Calcutta, India |
| | Sharafat 86' | Report | | Stadium: Salt Lake Stadium |

=== 1988 ===
| 7 April 1988 1988 AFC Asian Cup qualification | Malaysia | 4–0 | Pakistan | Kuala Lumpur, Malaysia |
| | Mat Din 49'; Hassan 79', 80'; Salleh 84' | Report |

| 10 April 1988 1988 AFC Asian Cup qualification | Jordan | 1–0 | Pakistan | Kuala Lumpur, Malaysia |
| | Al-Turk 44' | Report |

| 15 April 1988 1988 AFC Asian Cup qualification | Kuwait | 3–0 | Pakistan | Kuala Lumpur, Malaysia |
| | Al-Haddad; Al-Anezi; Hussain | Report |

| 18 April 1988 1988 AFC Asian Cup qualification | Japan | 4–1 | Pakistan | Kuala Lumpur, Malaysia |
| | Maeda 3'; Oenoki 37'; Matsuyama 69'; Minoguchi 88' | Report | Sarwar 63' |

=== 1989 ===
| 6 January 1989 1990 FIFA World Cup qualification | Pakistan | 0–1 | Kuwait | Islamabad, Pakistan |
| | | Report | Al-Hajeri 5' | Stadium: Jinnah Sports Stadium; Referee: Syed Iqbal (India) |

| 20 January 1989 1990 FIFA World Cup qualification | United Arab Emirates | 5–0 | Pakistan | Sharjah, United Arab Emirates |
| | A. Ibrahim 1', 25'; Khalid Ismaïl 64'; Abdulrahman Mohamed 78'; Abdulaziz Mohamed 85' | Report | | Stadium: Sharjah Stadium; Referee: Abu-Ali (Jordan) |

| 27 January 1989 1990 FIFA World Cup qualification | Kuwait | 2–0 | Pakistan | Kuwait City, Kuwait |
| | Al-Hadyah 42', 78' | Report | | Stadium: Al-Qadisiya Stadium; Referee: Al-Sharif (Saudi Arabia) |

| 10 February 1989 1990 FIFA World Cup qualification | Pakistan | 1–4 | United Arab Emirates | Islamabad, Pakistan |
| | Sharafat 81' | Report | Khalid Ismaïl 7'; A. Ibrahim 26'; Al-Talyani 27'; Abdulaziz Mohamed 70' | Stadium: Jinnah Sports Stadium; Referee: Nazari (Iran) |

| 22 October 1989 1989 South Asian Games G.S | Pakistan | 0–0 | Nepal | Islamabad, Pakistan |
| | | Report | | Stadium: Jinnah Sports Stadium; Referee: Dezfouly Hadi (Iran) |

| 24 October 1989 1989 South Asian Games G.S | Pakistan | 2–0 | Maldives | Islamabad, Pakistan |
| | Ashfaq 38'; Sharafat 54' | Report | | Stadium: Jinnah Sports Stadium; Referee: Mohamad Mushiseen Ariff |

| 26 October 1989 1989 South Asian Games Final | Pakistan | 1–0 | Bangladesh | Islamabad, Pakistan |
| | Sattar 90' | Report | | Stadium: Jinnah Sports Stadium; Attendance: 40,000; Referee: Dezfouly Hadi (Iran) |
