= 1967 RCD Cup =

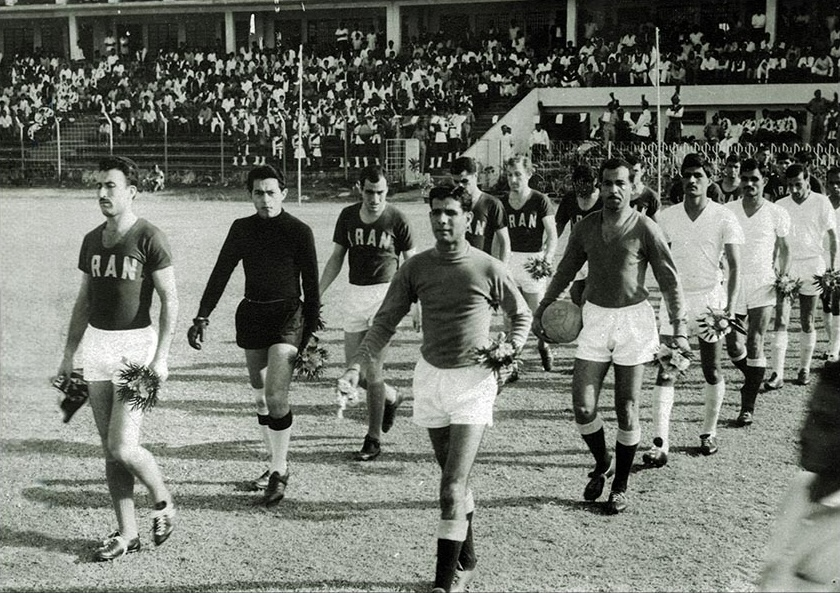
- Pakistan vs Iran during the 1967 RCD Cup

Tournament details
- Country: East Pakistan (currently Bangladesh)
- Venue(s): Dhaka Stadium, Dhaka
- Dates: 25 November – 28 November
- Teams: 3

Final positions
- Champions: Turkey (1st title)
- Runners-up: Iran
- Third place: Pakistan

Tournament statistics
- Matches played: 3
- Goals scored: 14 (4.67 per match)
- Attendance: 65,000 (21,667 per match)
- Top goal scorer: (Pakistan) Abdul Jabbar (3 goals)

The 1967 RCD Cup was the second edition of the RCD Cup. The event was held at the Dhaka Stadium in Dhaka, East Pakistan, (now Bangladesh). This was a three nation tournament played in league format between Iran, Pakistan and Turkey.

== Venue ==
Dhaka	1967 RCD Cup is located in Bangladesh
Dhaka Stadium	1967 RCD Cup is located in Bangladesh
Capacity: 36,000	1967 RCD Cup is located in Bangladesh

== Results ==
Pos	Team	Pld	W	D	L	GF	GA	GD	Pts	Final result
1	Turkey	2	2	0	0	8	4	+4	4	Champions
2	Iran	2	1	0	1	2	1	+1	2	
3	Pakistan	2	0	0	2	4	9	−5	0	

Source: RSSSF

== Matches ==
25 November 1967

Iran	2–0	Pakistan
Esmaili 35'; Behzadi 65'	Report

Dhaka Stadium, Dhaka
Attendance: 5,000
Referee: Orhan Gönül (Turkey)

26 November 1967

Iran	0–1	Turkey
	Report	Güzelırmak 70'

Dhaka Stadium, Dhaka
Attendance: 5,000
Referee: Issa Khan (Pakistan)

28 November 1967

Turkey	7–4	Pakistan
Zemzem 4', 6'; Ergün Acuner 32', 80'; Altıparmak 34'; Elmastaşoğlu 40'; Sarıalioğlu 60'	Report	Aslam 53'; Jabbar 79', 87', 89'

Dhaka Stadium, Dhaka
Attendance: 55,000
Referee: Orhan Gönül (Turkey)

== Top scorers ==
=== 3 Goals ===
- (Pakistan) Abdul Jabbar

2 Goals

- (Turkey) Fevzi Zemzem
- (Turkey) Ergün Acuner

==== 1 Goal ====
- (Pakistan) Sardar Aslam
- (Iran) Fariborz Esmaili
- (Iran) Homayoun Behzadi
- (Turkey) Nevzat Güzelırmak
- (Turkey) Ogün Altıparmak
- (Turkey) Ayhan Elmastaşoğlu
- (Turkey) Sanlı Sarıalioğlu

== Squads ==
=== Iran ===
Head coach: (Iran) Hossein Fekri

No.	Pos.	Player	Date of birth (age)	Caps	Club
1	GK	Faramarz Zelli	31 December 1940 (aged 26)		(Iran) Pas Tehran F.C.
2	DF	Mohammad Ranjbar	1 January 1935 (aged 32)		(Iran) Pas Tehran F.C.
3	DF	Parviz Ghelichkhani	4 December 1945 (aged 21)		(Iran) Kian F.C.
4	DF	Hassan Habibi (c)	7 February 1939 (aged 28)		(Iran) Pas Tehran F.C.
5	DF	Mehrab Shahrokhi	2 February 1944 (aged 23)		(Iran) Persepolis F.C.
6	MF	Asghar Sharafi	22 December 1942 (aged 24)		(Iran) Pas Tehran F.C.
7	MF	Mostafa Arab	31 December 1942 (aged 24)		(Iran) Oghab F.C.
8	MF	Jalal Talebi	23 March 1942 (aged 25)		(Iran) Taj S.C.
9	FW	Hossein Kalani	23 June 1940 (aged 27)		(Iran) Persepolis F.C.
10	FW	Fariborz Esmaili	1 July 1940 (aged 27)		(Iran) Taj S.C.
11	FW	Homayoun Behzadi	20 January 1942 (aged 25)		(Iran) Persepolis F.C.
12	MF	Mahmoud Yavari	11 October 1939 (aged 28)		(Iran) Pas Tehran F.C.
13	MF	Nazem Ganjapour	22 March 1943 (aged 24)		(Iran) Persepolis F.C.

=== Pakistan ===
Head coach: (Pakistan) Muhammad Amin

No.	Pos.	Player	Date of birth (age)	Caps	Club
	GK	Muhammad Latif (c)			Pakistan Western Railway
	GK	Niaz Gul			Pakistan Air Force
	DF	Ghulam Akbar			(Pakistan)
	DF	Hussain Bakhsh			(Pakistan)
	DF	Wali Muhammad			Pakistan Western Railway
	DF	Muhammad Arshad			Pakistan Western Railway
	DF	Murad Bakhsh			Pakistan Airlines
	MF	Younus Rana	10 April 1941 (aged 26)		Pakistan Western Railway
	MF	Maula Bakhsh Momin			(Pakistan)
	FW	Sardar Aslam	1945 (aged 22)		(Pakistan) Dacca Wanderers
	FW	Ali Nawaz Baloch	3 July 1949 (aged 18)		Pakistan Airlines
	FW	Ayub Dar	5 December 1947 (aged 19)		Pakistan Western Railway
	FW	Maula Bakhsh	1947 (aged 20)		(Pakistan) Karachi Port Trust
	FW	Hafiz Uddin Ahmad	29 October 1944 (aged 23)		(Pakistan) Mohammedan Sporting
	FW	Abdul Jabbar	1945 (aged 22)		(Pakistan) Mohammedan Sporting
	FW	Abdullah Akbar	1945 (aged 22)		(Pakistan) EPIDC
		Abid Ali			(Pakistan)

=== Turkey ===
Head coach: (Turkey) Adnan Süvari

No.	Pos.	Player	Date of birth (age)	Caps	Club
2	GK	Aydın Tohumcu	2 January 1944 (aged 23)		(Turkey) Ankaragücü
1	GK	Ali Artuner	5 September 1944 (aged 23)		(Turkey) Göztepe A.Ş.
3	DF	Hüseyin Yazıcı	3 October 1939 (aged 28)		(Turkey) Göztepe A.Ş.
4	DF	Yılmaz Şen	26 October 1943 (aged 24)		(Turkey) Fenerbahçe
5	DF	Fehmi Sağınoğlu	16 April 1937 (aged 30)		(Turkey) Beşiktaş J.K.
6	MF	Nevzat Güzelırmak	1 January 1942 (aged 25)		(Turkey) Göztepe A.Ş.
7	DF	Talat Özkarslı	21 September 1940 (aged 27)		(Turkey) Galatasaray
8	MF	Ayhan Elmastaşoğlu	23 August 1941 (aged 26)		(Turkey) Galatasaray
9	FW	Sanlı Sarıalioğlu	4 July 1945 (aged 22)		(Turkey) Beşiktaş J.K.
10	FW	Ercan Aktuna	26 June 1940 (aged 27)		(Turkey) Fenerbahçe
11	FW	Nedim Doğan	3 February 1943 (aged 24)		(Turkey) Fenerbahçe
12	MF	Şeref Has (c)	27 September 1936 (aged 31)		(Turkey) Fenerbahçe
13	FW	Ogün Altıparmak	10 November 1938 (aged 29)		(Turkey) Fenerbahçe
14	FW	Fevzi Zemzem	27 June 1941 (aged 26)		(Turkey) Göztepe A.Ş.
15	MF	Ergün Acuner	18 June 1941 (aged 26)		(Turkey) Galatasaray
16	MF	Faruk Karadoğan	30 December 1947 (aged 19)		(Turkey) Beşiktaş J.K.
