= Yusuf Tunaoğlu =

Turkish association football player

Personal information
- Full name: Yusuf Kemal Tunaoğlu
- Date of birth: 1 January 1946
- Place of birth: Istanbul, Turkey
- Date of death: 23 October 2000 (aged 54)
- Place of death: Kuşadası, Aydın, Turkey
- Position: Midfielder

Youth career
- 1958–1962: Beşiktaş B

Senior career*
Years	Team	Apps	(Gls)
1962–1974	Beşiktaş	172	(23)
1974–1975	Altay	16	(0)
1975–1976	Beşiktaş	9	(0)
Total		197	(23)

International career
1963–1964	Turkey U-18	5	(1)
1966–1967	Turkey U-21	3	(1)
1964–1971	Turkey	6	(0)
- * Club domestic league appearances and goals

Yusuf Tunaoğlu (1 January 1946 – 22 July 2000) was a Turkish former international footballer and sports writer.

== Career ==
Yusuf Tunaoğlu started to play football at the age of 8. Tunaoğlu started to play club football at Beşiktaş J.K in 1958, where he was promoted to senior team at the age of 17 in 1962–63 season. In June 1970, Tunaoğlu was linked with Belgian side Anderlecht. Tunaoğlu retired from professional football in 1976.

Yusuf Tunaoğlu represented Turkey, making 6 appearances between 1964 and 1971.

With support from senior sports writer, İslam Çupi, Yusuf Tunaoğlu joined Turkish nationwide newspaper Milliyet as a sports writer in 1987.

== Style of play and reception ==
Yusuf Tunaoğlu is regarded as an "unforgettable player" by Beşiktaş J.K. His former teammate Sanlı Sarıalioğlu described his style "magical" whereas his other former teammate Vedat Okyar once expressed about him: "While playing alongside [him], sometimes I was stopping to play for a moment and ruminating as watching him play. This great football talent [Tunaoğlu] astonished everybody". Another former player, Abdullah Akbar, who represented the Pakistan national team in the 1960s, praised and viewed Yusuf as his favourite footballer.

During his professional career, Tunaoğlu possessed renown attributes of vision on pitch, playmaking, precision passing and ball control. He also possessed a high level upper body strength.

== Death and legacy ==
Tunaoğlu died due to cardiac arrest in Kuşadası on 22 July 2000. He was buried in Zincirlikuyu Cemetery. Since then, Tunaoğlu is commemorated annually by Beşiktaş J.K. representatives upon his grave.

In 2001, a charity game held after Tunaoğlu's name where former Big Three players competed at a single-game 6-on-6 teams honorary tournament, including former Beşiktaş players Mehmet Ekşi, Rıza Çalımbay, Metin Tekin, Ziya Doğan, Cem Pamiroğlu, Uğur Tütüneker and Özcan Kızıltan held at Süleyman Seba Hall in Fulya, Beşiktaş.

In 2009, owned by Ministry of Youth and Sports, Yusuf Tunaoğlu Stadium with 2,500 seating capacity was opened in Ayazağa Neighbourhood of Sarıyer District, Istanbul.

On 16 October 2019, Beşiktaş J.K. announced "Yusuf Tunaoğlu Football Directorate" is openened at Nevzat Demir Facilities of the club, located in Ümraniye, Istanbul.

== Achievements ==
Beşiktaş J.K

- Süper Lig (2): 1965–66, 1966–67
- Turkish Super Cup (1): 1966–67
- TSYD Cup (4): 1964–65, 1965–66, 1971–72, 1972–73

Turkey

- ECO Cup (1): 1969

=== Individual ===
- Beşiktaş J.K. Squads of Century (Golden Team)

== Filmography ==
Year	Title	Role	Director
1974	Arkadaş	The Drunk	Yılmaz Güney
