= Qadir Bakhsh =

Pakistani footballer

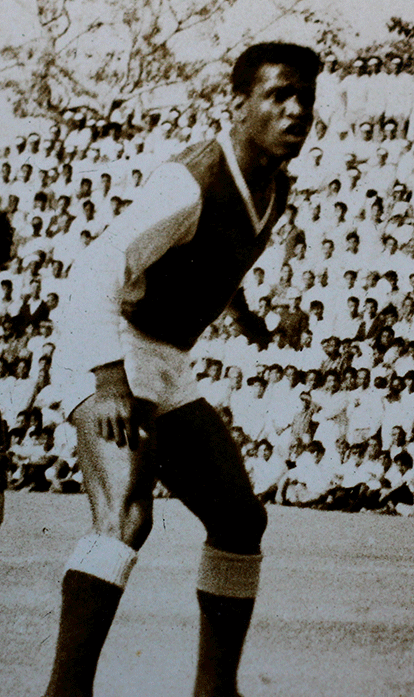
- Bakhsh in 1969

Personal information
- Full name: Ghulam Qadir Bakhsh
- Date of birth: 10 October 1947
- Place of birth: Lyari, Karachi, Pakistan
- Date of death: 2008
- Place of death: Lyari, Karachi, Pakistan
- Position: Midfielder

Youth career
- Baghdad Sports

Senior career*
Years	Team	Apps	(Gls)
1962–1964	Victoria SC		
1965–1968	Mohammedan SC		
1969	Dilkusha SC		
1970	EPIDC		
1971	PWD		
1971–??	KMC		

International career
1967–1974	Pakistan		(1)

Managerial career
- 1986: President XI
- * Club domestic league appearances and goals

Ghulam Qadir Bakhsh (Urdu: غلام قادر بخش; 10 October 1947 – 2008), was a Pakistani footballer who played as a midfielder. Nicknamed as Putla, Qadir played in the 1960s and 1970s and captained the Pakistan national team in 1970.

== Early life ==
Bakhsh was born on 10 October 1947 in the Lyari locality of Karachi. He studied at Jamia Islamia Khada School and Private Education until intermediate level, where he started playing football at school level. He later joined local club Baghdad Sports.

== Club career ==
Bakhsh played football at senior level for Dhaka PIDC, Dhaka Mohammedan, Dilkusha SC, and Victoria SC in the Dhaka First Division League. He also played for PWD Sports Club in 1971. During his stay in the Dhaka League, he also represented Dacca Division at the National Football Championship.

After the independence of Bangladesh, Bakhsh returned to West Pakistan and played for Karachi Municipal Corporation. He represented the Sindh Red selection that clinched the 1975 National Football Championship at Quetta.

== International career ==
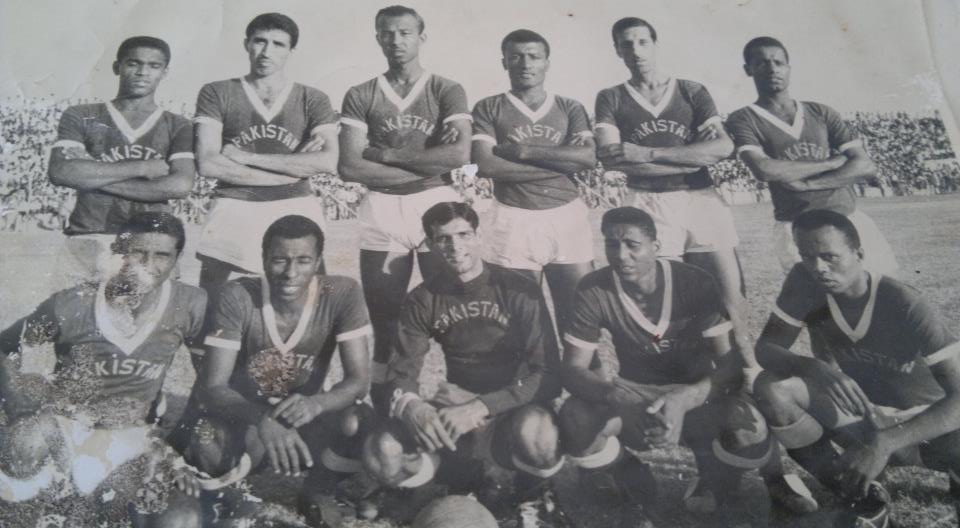
Bakhsh standing at far left with Pakistan in 1966

Bakhsh was noticed while playing for the Karachi Division team that beat a Turkish visiting team 4–0 in a charity match played to benefit the flood victims of East Pakistan. He was subsequently called by the Pakistan national youth team in 1965 which toured Soviet Union. The next year, Qadir played with the national team in a three-test home series for the against FC Alga from the Soviet Union. In 1967, marked his first international appearances with Pakistan in four friendly matches in Pakistan against Saudi Arabia, scoring the equalizer in the last match that ended in a 1–1 draw. In the subsequent years, he also featured with the national team in test series against FC Kairat in 1968, and CSKA Moscow in 1969.

In March 1969, he featured in the Friendship Cup held in Iran, and the 1969 RCD Cup in Turkey. In 1970, he was appointed as the vice-captain of the Pakistan Football Federation XI team for the 1970 Friendship Cup in Iran after Younus Rana. Six months later, Bakhsh was appointed head captain for the 1970 RCD Cup, becoming the fourth player to captain the national team at the RCD Cup tournament after Muhammad Umer in 1965, Muhammad Latif in 1967, and Sardar Aslam in 1969. In 1973, Bakhsh toured China with the national team for friendly matches.

== Managerial career ==
Bakhsh was coach of President's XI that featured in the 1986 Pakistan President's Gold Cup in Karachi which finished second in the tournament.

== Later life ==
After retirement from football, he served as sub engineer in the water board. His sons Badr Qadir played football for Pakistan Airlines, Wasim Qadir for National Bank, and Junaid Qadir for Karachi Port Trust, and are also Pakistan youth international players.

In 2008, it was reported that Bakhsh had been partially paralyzed at the age of 63, and been receiving treatment at the Lyari General Hospital. A stroke had left him unable to use his right leg, and in needs to undergo regular physiotherapy. He died soon after.

== Career statistics ==
=== International goals ===
Scores and results list Pakistan's goal tally first, score column indicates score after each Qadir goal.

List of international goals scored by Qadir Bakhsh
No.	Date	Venue	Opponent	Score	Result	Competition	Ref.
1	29 March 1967	KMC Stadium, Karachi, Pakistan	Saudi Arabia	1–1	1–1	Friendly	

== Honours ==
Mohammedan SC

- Aga Khan Gold Cup: 1968

Sindh Red

- National Football Championship: 1975

== See also ==
- List of Pakistan national football team captains
