= 1969 RCD Cup =

Tournament details
- Country: Turkey
- Venue(s): Ankara 19 Mayıs Stadium, Ankara
- Dates: 13 September–17 September
- Teams: 3

Final positions
- Champions: Turkey (2nd title)
- Runners-up: Iran
- Third place: Pakistan

Tournament statistics
- Matches played: 3
- Goals scored: 16 (5.33 per match)
- Attendance: 47,000 (15,667 per match)
- Top goal scorer: (Turkey) Can Bartu (3 goals)

The 1969 RCD Cup was the third edition of the RCD Cup. The event was held at the Ankara 19 Mayıs Stadium in Ankara, Turkey. This was a three nation tournament played in league format between Iran, Pakistan and Turkey.

== Venue ==
Ankara is located in Turkey	Ankara
Ankara is located in Turkey	Ankara 19 Mayıs Stadium
Ankara is located in Turkey	Capacity: 19,219

== Results ==
Pos	Team	Pld	W	D	L	GF	GA	GD	Pts	Final result
1	Turkey	2	2	0	0	8	2	+6	4	Champions
2	Iran	2	1	0	1	4	6	−2	2	
3	Pakistan	2	0	0	2	4	8	−4	0	

Source: RSSSF

== Matches ==
13 September 1969

Iran	4–2	Pakistan
Kalani 9', 14'; Mazloumi 47', 67'	Report	Dar 75'; Akbar 78'

Ankara 19 Mayıs Stadium, Ankara
Attendance: 7,000
Referee: Bagatter (Turkey)

14 September 1969

Turkey	4–2	Pakistan
Zemzem 17'; C. Bartu 44', 65'; Sarıalioğlu 75'	Report	Aslam 8'; Nawaz 60'

Ankara 19 Mayıs Stadium, Ankara
Referee: Ferdi Ali Donal (Iran)

17 September 1969

Turkey	4–0	Iran
Konca 12', 29'; C. Bartu 32'; Kurt 41'	Report

Ankara 19 Mayıs Stadium, Ankara
Attendance: 40,000
Referee: Afzal Khan (Pakistan)

== Top scorers ==
3 Goals

- (Turkey) Can Bartu

2 Goals

- (Turkey) Ender Konca
- (Iran) Gholam Hossein Mazloumi
- (Iran) Hossein Kalani

=== 1 goal ===
- (Pakistan) Ali Nawaz Baloch
- (Pakistan) Ayub Dar
- (Pakistan) Sardar Aslam
- (Pakistan) Abdullah Akbar
- (Turkey) Metin Kurt
- (Turkey) Sanlı Sarıalioğlu
- (Turkey) Fevzi Zemzem

== Squads ==
=== Iran ===
Head coach: (Iran) Hossein Fekri

No.	Pos.	Player	Date of birth (age)	Caps	Club
1	GK	Nasser Hejazi	19 December 1949 (aged 19)		(Iran) Taj S.C.
2	DF	Dariush Mostafavi	8 September 1944 (aged 25)		(Iran) Persepolis F.C.
3	MF	Parviz Ghelichkhani	4 December 1945 (aged 23)		(Iran) Pas Tehran F.C.
4	DF	Hassan Habibi (c)	7 February 1939 (aged 30)		(Iran) Pas Tehran F.C.
5	DF	Mehrab Shahrokhi	2 February 1944 (aged 25)		(Iran) Persepolis Tehran F.C.
6	MF	Mehdi Monajati	29 June 1947 (aged 22)		(Iran) Pas Tehran F.C.
7	MF	Mostafa Arab	31 December 1942 (aged 26)		(Iran) Oghab F.C.
8	MF	Hossein Babakhanloo			(Iran)
9	FW	Hossein Kalani	23 June 1940 (aged 29)		(Iran) Persepolis Tehran F.C.
10	FW	Gholam Hossein Mazloumi	13 January 1950 (aged 19)		(Iran) Taj S.C.
11	FW	Gholam Vafakhah	23 February 1947 (aged 22)		(Iran) Taj S.C.
12	DF	Ebrahim Ashtiani	4 January 1942 (aged 27)		(Iran) Persepolis Tehran F.C.
13	MF	Parviz Mirzahassan	15 October 1945 (aged 23)		(Iran) Pas Tehran F.C.
14	DF	Mehdi Lavasani	11 July 1947 (aged 22)		(Iran) Taj S.C.
15	DF	Jafar Kashani	4 March 1945 (aged 24)		(Iran) Persepolis Tehran F.C.

=== Pakistan ===
Head coach: (India) Mohammed Rahmatullah

No.	Pos.	Player	Date of birth (age)	Caps	Club
	GK	Shahidur Rahman Shantoo	17 November 1947 (aged 21)		(Pakistan) Mohammedan Sporting
	GK	Fazal Durrani			Pakistan Army
	DF	Muhammad Arshad			Pakistan Railways
	DF	Kazi Mahmud Hasan	28 January 1946 (aged 23)		Pakistan Army
	DF	Miskeen			Pakistan Army
	DF	Ali Muhammad Sr.			(Pakistan) Quetta Division
	DF	Zakaria Pintoo	1 January 1943 (aged 26)		(Pakistan) Mohammedan Sporting
	MF	Younus Rana	10 April 1941 (aged 28)		Pakistan Railways
	MF	Qadir Bakhsh	10 October 1947 (aged 21)		(Pakistan) Dilkusha
	MF	Abdullah Akbar	1945 (aged 24)		(Pakistan) EPIDC
	FW	Sardar Aslam (c)	1945 (aged 24)		(Pakistan) Dacca Wanderers
	FW	Golam Sarwar Tipu	22 October 1945 (aged 23)		(Pakistan) Mohammedan Sporting
	FW	Ali Nawaz Baloch	3 July 1949 (aged 20)		(Pakistan) Mohammedan Sporting
	FW	Maula Bakhsh	1947 (aged 22)		(Pakistan) Mohammedan Sporting
	FW	Abdul Jabbar	1945 (aged 24)		(Pakistan) EPIDC
	FW	Ayub Dar	5 December 1947 (aged 21)		Pakistan Railways
	FW	Hafiz Uddin Ahmad	29 October 1944 (aged 24)		(Pakistan) Mohammedan Sporting
	FW	Haji Ilyas			(Pakistan) Warsak FC

=== Turkey ===
Head coach: (Socialist Federal Republic of Yugoslavia) Abdullah Gegić

No.	Pos.	Player	Date of birth (age)	Caps	Club
1	GK	Mümin Özkasap	1 March 1944 (aged 25)		(Turkey) Eskisehirspor
2	DF	Aydın Tohumcu	1 February 1943 (aged 26)		(Turkey) Ankaragücü
3	DF	Çağlayan Derebaşı	21 October 1941 (aged 27)		(Turkey) Göztepe A.Ş.
4	DF	Mehmet Işıkal	21 November 1941 (aged 27)		(Turkey) Göztepe A.Ş.
5	MF	Ergün Acuner	18 June 1941 (aged 28)		(Turkey) Galatasaray
6	MF	Kamuran Yavuz	30 December 1947 (aged 21)		(Turkey) Eskisehirspor
7	MF	Muzaffer Sipahi	7 March 1941 (aged 28)		(Turkey) Galatasaray
8	MF	Nuri Toygün	9 October 1943 (aged 25)		(Turkey) Eskisehirspor
9	MF	Nihat Yayöz	6 June 1945 (aged 24)		(Turkey) Beşiktaş J.K.
10	FW	Sanlı Sarıalioğlu	4 July 1945 (aged 24)		(Turkey) Beşiktaş J.K.
11	FW	Ercan Aktuna	26 June 1940 (aged 29)		(Turkey) Fenerbahçe
12	FW	Ertan Öznur	2 September 1944 (aged 25)		(Turkey) Göztepe A.Ş.
13	FW	Fevzi Zemzem	27 June 1941 (aged 28)		(Turkey) Göztepe A.Ş.
14	FW	Ersel Altıparmak	10 May 1942 (aged 27)		(Turkey) Bursaspor
15	MF	Can Bartu (c)	30 January 1936 (aged 33)		(Turkey) Fenerbahçe
16	GK	Sabri Dino			(Turkey) Beşiktaş J.K.
17	DF	Ayhan Aşut	11 March 1944 (aged 25)		(Turkey) Eskisehirspor
18	DF	Yılmaz Şen	26 October 1943 (aged 25)		(Turkey) Fenerbahçe
19	MF	Yusuf Tunaoğlu			(Turkey) Beşiktaş J.K.
20	FW	Mesut Şen	12 June 1944 (aged 25)		(Turkey) Bursaspor
21	FW	Ender Konca	22 October 1947 (aged 21)		(Turkey) Eskisehirspor
22	MF	Metin Kurt	15 March 1948 (aged 21)		(Turkey) P.T.T.
