= Abdul Jabbar (footballer) =

Pakistani footballer (1945–2014)

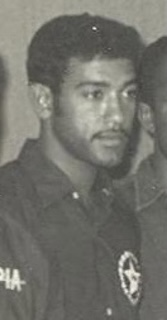
- Jabbar with Pakistan Airlines in 1971

Personal information
- Full name: Abdul Jabbar
- Date of birth: 1945
- Place of birth: Lyari, Karachi, British India
- Date of death: 25 March 2014 (aged 69)
- Place of death: Karachi, Pakistan
- Position: Forward

Youth career
- Bijli Sports Club

Senior career*
Years	Team	Apps	(Gls)
1962–1963	Bijli Sports		
1964	PWD		
1965	Victoria		
1966	EPIDC		
1967–1968	Mohammedan Sporting		
1968	Mersin İdman Yurdu	2	(0)
1969–1970	EPIDC		
1971–??	Pakistan Airlines		

International career
1967–1969	Pakistan	8	(4)
- * Club domestic league appearances and goals

Abdul Jabbar (Urdu: عبدالجبار; 1945 – 25 March 2014), was a Pakistani professional footballer who played as a forward. Jabbar played as an inside left forward. He represented the Pakistan national football team from 1967 to 1969, and is one of the first and few Pakistani footballers to play professional football abroad, joining Mersin İdman Yurdu in 1968.

== Early life ==
Jabbar was born in 1945 in Shah Baig Line, in the Lyari locality of Karachi.

== Club career ==
=== Early career ===
Jabbar started playing football from childhood, and began his senior club career with Bijli Sports Club at the regional Karachi First Division League in 1962. He also represented the Karachi Division team at the National Football Championship.

=== Dhaka League ===
In 1964, Jabbar moved to East Pakistan based departmental side PWD Sports Club, and then moved to Victoria the following year. He later represented EPIDC and Dhaka Mohammedan. During his stay in the Dhaka League, he also represented Dacca Division at the National Football Championship.

=== Turkish league ===
Following the match against Turkey at the 1967 RCD Cup, Jabbar was approached by Turkish Top-flight team, Mersin İdman Yurdu. On 6 April 1968, Jabbar along with his national teammate and fellow Lyari player Maula Bakhsh signed for Turkish First Football League club Mersin İdman Yurdu. Both players stayed at the club for six months. Jabbar made two appearances with the team against Ankara Demirspor and Hacettepe during the 1967–68 Turkish First Football League. Jabbar and Bakhsh then returned to Pakistan, where they rejoined Mohammedan Sporting, and helped them win the 1968 Aga Khan Gold Cup, with both players finding the net in the 5–0 victory over Ceylon Colts in the final.

=== Pakistan Airlines ===
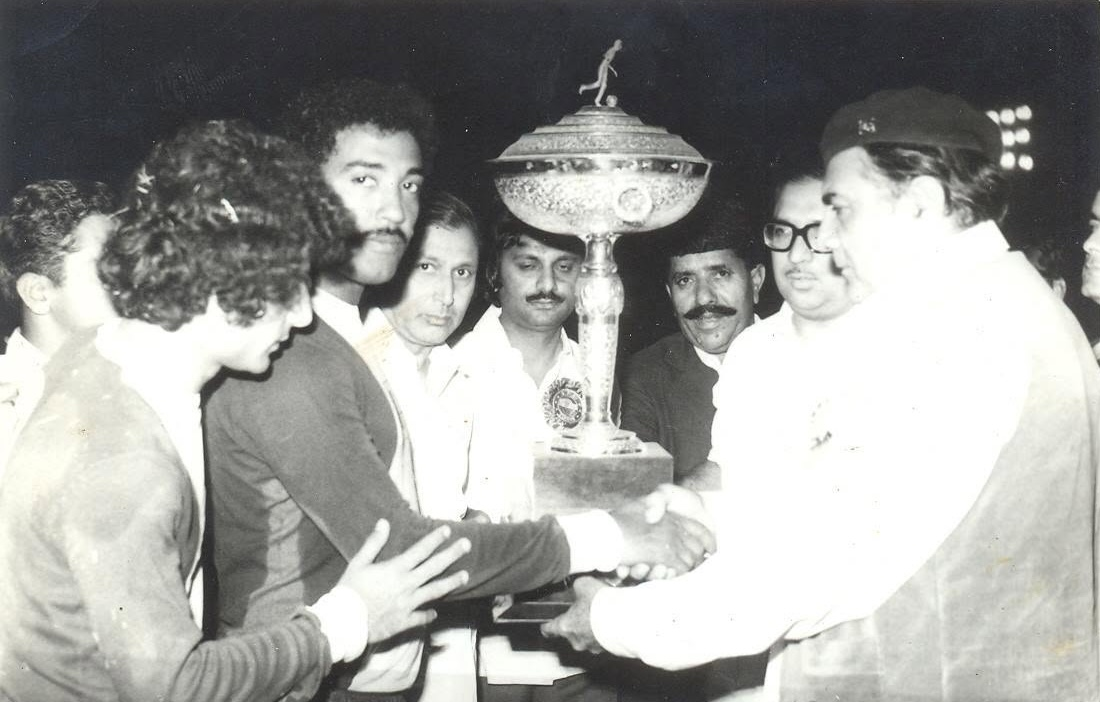
Jabbar receiving the 1976 National Football Championship trophy.

Following the fall of Dhaka, Jabbar joined Pakistan Airlines and continued to play for the team until his retirement from the game. Jabbar played a crucial role in the club's dominance at the National Football Championship, helping them win several editions of the competition. He also served as captain of the club.

In 1976, Jabbar led an 18-member PIA team, to a tour to Abu Dhabi for seven days from 16 December 1976, the team would play two exhibition matches.

== International career ==
In 1967, Jabbar was selected for the Pakistan XI for an unofficial friendly series against the touring American soccer club, Dallas Tornado, during their worldwide tour in October 1967. In the first test played in Lahore, Pakistan XI was defeated by 0–2, but the series was levelled with a victory of 4–1 in Dhaka. He found the back of the net in the final game, which resulted in a 5–2 victory for Pakistan, in which Jabbar scored twice.

Due to his impressive performances, this led Muhammad Amin, along with the national team selection committee, to include him in the national team for the 1968 Asian Cup qualifiers held in Rangoon, Burma. Where he featured in all three of Pakistan's matches. The same year, he was also part of the national team for the 1967 RCD Cup. In the tournament, Jabbar started against Iran in the first match, which Pakistan lost 2–4. The second match held on 28 November, was against Turkey. Although Pakistan lost the game due to the opponents overwhelming experience. Jabbar notably scored a hat-trick, reducing the margin to 4–7, with the other goal scored by fellow striker Sardar Aslam. This impressive performance prompted the Turkish Top-flight league team, Mersin İdman Yurdu to sign Jabbar alongside fellow national teammate Maula Bakhsh.

The following year, he also played in exhibition matches with the national side against teams from Soviet Union, such as FC Kairat in 1968, the Russian Central Army team in 1969, and in May 1969 when the national side went abroad playing against FC Aşgabat, Zarafshan XI, and Neftyanik. In the same year, he also participated in the 1969 Friendship Cup held in Tehran, Iran. Where the team played against Iraq and Iran, against the former, after conceding in the 57th minute of the game, substitute Ali Nawaz would equalize just two minutes later, and Pakistan would defeat their opponents by a goal from Jabbar, who scored the winning goal against Iraq in the 90th minute to seal their victory. Jabbar also started the next match against Iran, however, his team faced a 1–9 loss. At the RCD Cup, Jabbar was included in Pakistan's line-up against Iran, which proved to be his final international appearance for the national team.

== Death ==
Jabbar died on 25 March 2014, at the age of 69.

== Career statistics ==
=== International goals ===
Scores and results list Pakistan's goal tally first, score column indicates score after each Jabbar goal.

List of international goals scored by Abdul Jabbar
No.	Date	Venue	Opponent	Score	Result	Competition	Ref.
1	28 November 1967	Dacca Stadium, Dacca, East Pakistan	Turkey	2–6	4–7	1967 RCD Cup	
2	28 November 1967	Dacca Stadium, Dacca, East Pakistan	Turkey	3–7	4–7	1967 RCD Cup	
3	28 November 1967	Dacca Stadium, Dacca, East Pakistan	Turkey	4–7	4–7	1967 RCD Cup	
4	10 March 1969	Amjadiyeh Stadium, Tehran, Iran	Iraq	2–1	2–1	1969 Friendship Cup	

== Honours ==
=== Mohammedan Sporting ===
- Aga Khan Gold Cup:
  - Winners (1): 1968

== See also ==
- List of Pakistan national football team hat-tricks
