= Niaz Gul =

Pakistani footballer (Unknown birthdate)

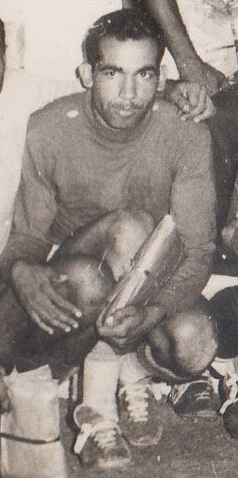
- Gul with Pakistan Air Force in 1963

Personal information
- Full name: Niaz Gul
- Date of birth: Unknown
- Place of birth: British India
- Date of death: 14 January 2021
- Place of death: Karachi, Pakistan

Senior career*
Years	Team	Apps	(Gls)
??–1965	Pakistan Air Force		
1966–??	Pakistan Airlines		

International career
1962–1967	Pakistan		
- * Club domestic league appearances and goals

Niaz Gul (Urdu: نیاز گل; died 14 January 2021) was a Pakistani footballer who played as a goalkeeper. Gul is regarded as one of the most prominent goalkeepers of the Pakistan national football team during the 1960s.

== Club career ==
Gul played for the Pakistan Air Force team in the 1960s, captaining the side several times throughout his career. In 1963, he helped the team reach a runners-up position at the 1963 Mohammad Ali Bogra Football Tournament, finishing behind Victoria SC.

He later joined Pakistan Airlines in 1966, playing for the team until his eventual retirement in the 1970s.

== International career ==
Gul represented the Pakistan national team in the 1960s. He was first selected for the 1962 Merdeka Tournament, Where he was key in protecting the net throughout the tournament, also being included in the final against Indonesia.

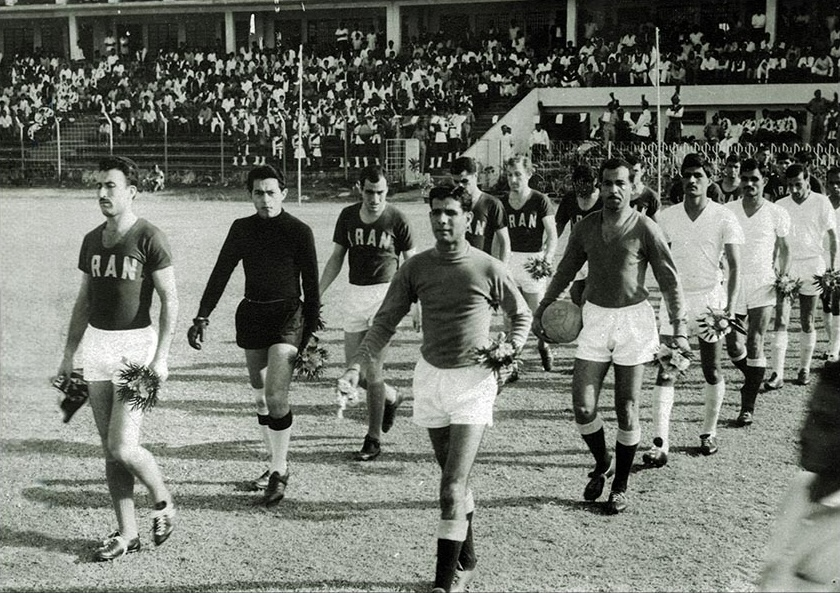
Gul second from front with Pakistan at the 1967 RCD Cup

In 1963, he was the starting goalkeeper for the 1964 Summer Olympics qualification first away leg match. The next year, he took part in the 1965 RCD Cup held in Tehran, Iran, as well as the 1967 RCD Cup, where he came on as a substitute for Muhammad Latif in the second half. Gul also participated with the national team at the 1968 AFC Asian Cup qualification.

== Death ==
Gul died on 14 January 2021.

== Honours ==
=== Pakistan Air Force ===
- All-Pakistan Mohammad Ali Bogra Memorial Tournament:
  - Runners-up (1): 1963
- Inter-Services Football Championship:
  - Winners (1): 1960
