= Wali Muhammad (footballer) =

Pakistani footballer (died 2020)

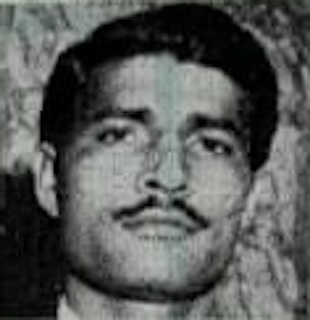
- Wali in 1969

Personal information
- Full name: Wali Muhammad
- Place of birth: Lyallpur, Pakistan
- Date of death: November 2020
- Place of death: Pakistan
- Position: Defender

Senior career*
| Years | Team | Apps | (Gls) |
- Pakistan Railways

International career
| 1967–1974 | Pakistan | | |
- * Club domestic league appearances and goals

Wali Muhammad (Urdu: ولی محمد; died November 2020) was a Pakistani footballer who played as a defender. He served as captain of the Pakistan national football team.

== Club career ==
Wali rose through the ranks from college football. He later played for several teams at the National Football Championship including Pakistan Railways, and divisional teams of Lyallpur and Rawalpindi.

== International career ==
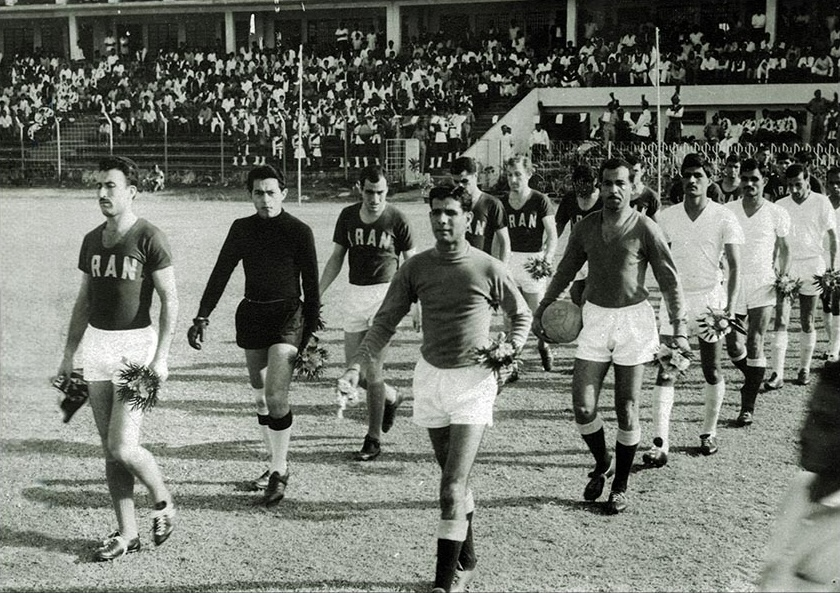
Wali third from front to back with Pakistan against Iran at 1967 RCD Cup

In March 1967, Wali was among members of the junior string squad which served as backup for the Pakistan national team for the friendly matches against Saudi Arabia.

In November 1967, he made his international debut at the 1968 AFC Asian Cup qualification in Burma. He took over the captaincy during the competition, after captain Turab Ali got injured in the second match of the tournament against India. At the 1967 RCD Cup, however he was stripped out of captaincy in favour of goalkeeper Muhammad Latif, where he featured in both matches against Iran and Turkey.

In March 1969, he toured Iran for the Friendship Cup held in Tehran, but failed to make it to the team for the tour to Soviet Union in May 1969 due to knee injury. After five years, he was again selected for the national team for the 1974 RCD Cup and the 1974 Asian Games.

== Death ==
"We will follow FIFA request but it was already decided on Friday to honor Maradona and an ex-Pakistan National Team player Wali Mohammad who passed away recently, as a sign of respect and mourn during the first fixtures of every team in the upcoming National Challenge Cup"

— PFF Director Technical Daniel Limones on 27 November 2020.

Wali died in November 2020. The Pakistan Football Federation instructed a minute silence across each team's opening fixture of the 2020 National Challenge Cup to honour him, alongside a worldwide FIFA-requested tribute to Diego Maradona.

== See also ==
- List of Pakistan national football team captains
