= Mehdi Lavasani =

Iranian footballer

Personal information
- Full name: Mehdi Lari Lavasani
- Date of birth: July 11, 1947 (age 79)
- Place of birth: Tehran, Iran
- Height: 1.80 m (5 ft 11 in)
- Position: Defender

Senior career*
Years	Team	Apps	(Gls)
1969–1979	Taj / Esteghlal		

International career
1969–1973	Iran	7	(0)
- * Club domestic league appearances and goals

Mehdi Lari Lavasani (Persian: مهدی لاری لواسانی, born 11 July 1947 in Tehran) is a retired Iranian defender who played for Iran national football team in 1972 Summer Olympics and 1969 RCD Cup. He was formerly playing for Taj Tehran and Iran national football team.
