= Muhammad Arshad (defender) =

Pakistani former footballer

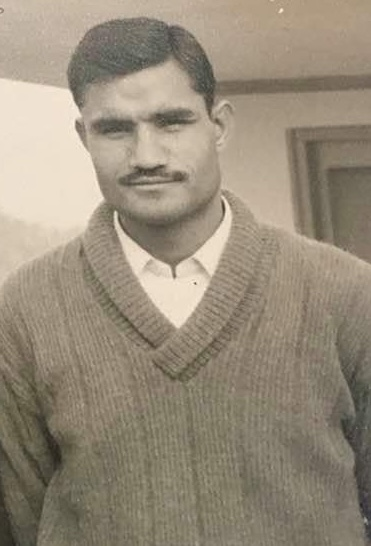
- Arshad in the 1960s

Personal information
- Full name: Chaudhary Muhammad Arshad
- Date of birth: Unknown
- Position: Defender

Senior career*
| Years | Team | Apps | (Gls) |
| 1966–1970s | Pakistan Western Railway | | |

International career
| 1967–1974 | Pakistan | | |
- * Club domestic league appearances and goals

Chaudhary Muhammad Arshad is a Pakistani former footballer who played a defender. He played for Pakistan Western Railway and also represented the Pakistan national football team.

== Club career ==
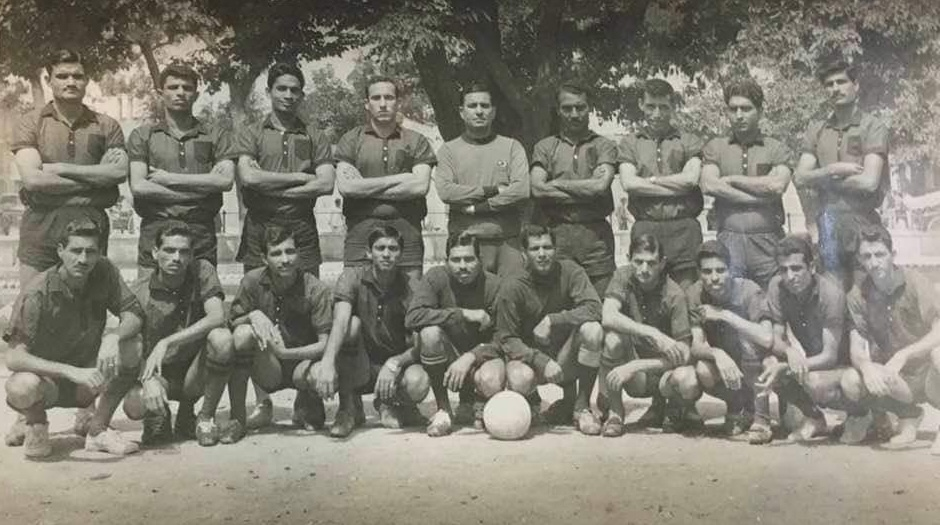
Arshad (standing extreme left) with the 1969 Pakistan Western Railway squad.

Arshad represented Pakistan Western Railway from 1966 till the 1970s. He notably played a key role in helping the team win the National Football Championship in 1969.

== International career ==
In 1967, Arshad was selected for the Pakistan national team at the 1968 AFC Asian Cup qualification, and later the 1967 RCD Cup. He returned to the squad two years later for the 1969 RCD Cup, where he started in both matches against Iran and Turkey. Later in 1969, Arshad travelled with the national team to Tehran, Iran, to take part in the 1969 Friendship Cup.

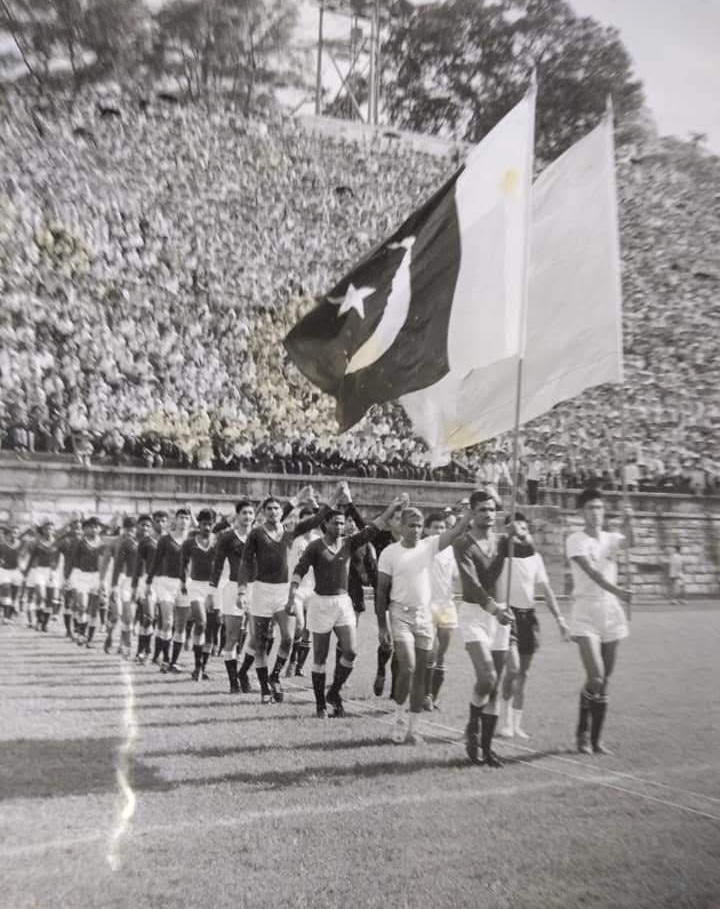
Arshad leading the Pakistan national team with the flag against Guangdong XI in China on 20 June 1973

In 1970, he again toured Iran for the 1970 Friendship Cup, playing against Paykan and Ankara Demirspor. He scored a free kick goal against Ankara Demirspor in a 1–1 draw.

In 1973, Arshad toured China, Hong Kong and North Korea with Pakistan. The following year, he was included in the squad for the 1974 RCD Cup and also represented Pakistan at the 1974 Asian Games.

== Honours ==
=== Pakistan Western Railway ===
- National Football Championship
  - Winners (1): 1969
  - Runners-up (1): 1966
