= 1975–76 UAE Football League =

UAE Football League
- Season: 1975–76
- Champions: Al Ahli
- Matches: 72
- Goals: 184 (2.56 per match)
- Top goalscorer: Ali Nawaz Baloch (13 goals)

Statistics of UAE Football League in season 1975–76.

== Overview ==
- Al-Ahli Football Club - Dubai won the championship.
- Ali Nawaz Baloch of Pakistan emerged as top scorer with 13 goals.

== League standings ==
| Pos | Team | Pld | W | D | L | GF | GA | GD | Pts |
|---|---|---|---|---|---|---|---|---|---|
| 1 | Al Ahli | 16 | 11 | 5 | 0 | 28 | 5 | +23 | 27 |
| 2 | Al Ain | 16 | 10 | 4 | 2 | 33 | 15 | +18 | 24 |
| 3 | Sharjah | 16 | 10 | 2 | 4 | 32 | 12 | +20 | 22 |
| 4 | Al Shabab | 16 | 4 | 8 | 4 | 14 | 17 | −3 | 16 |
| 5 | Emirates | 16 | 3 | 9 | 4 | 22 | 22 | 0 | 15 |
| 6 | Al Wasl | 16 | 4 | 5 | 7 | 19 | 28 | −9 | 13 |
| 7 | Oman | 16 | 3 | 6 | 7 | 17 | 20 | −3 | 12 |
| 8 | Al Shaab | 16 | 3 | 5 | 8 | 9 | 30 | −21 | 11 |
| 9 | Al Wahda | 16 | 1 | 2 | 13 | 10 | 35 | −25 | 4 |

Source: rsssf.com
