= Dad Muhammad =

Pakistani former footballer

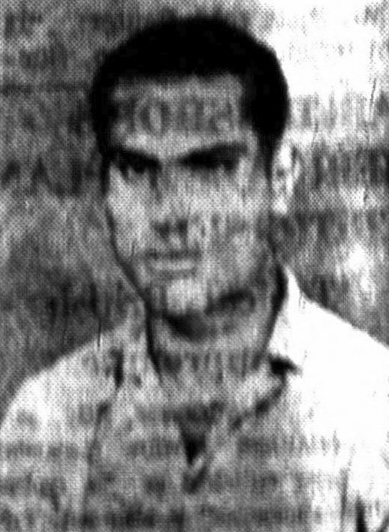
- Muhammad in 1949

Personal information
- Full name: Dad Muhammad Baloch
- Date of birth: Unknown
- Place of birth: Karachi, British India
- Date of death: Unknown
- Position: Midfielder

Senior career*
Years	Team	Apps	(Gls)
1948–1950s	Mohammedan Sporting		
1949	Jinnah Gymkhana		
1950s	Karachi Kickers		

International career
1950–1954	Pakistan		
- * Club domestic league appearances and goals

Dad Muhammad Baloch was a Pakistani footballer who played as a midfielder. He represented the Pakistan national team in the 1950s. Muhammad is regarded as one of the most notable Pakistani footballers of the 1950s.

== Club career ==
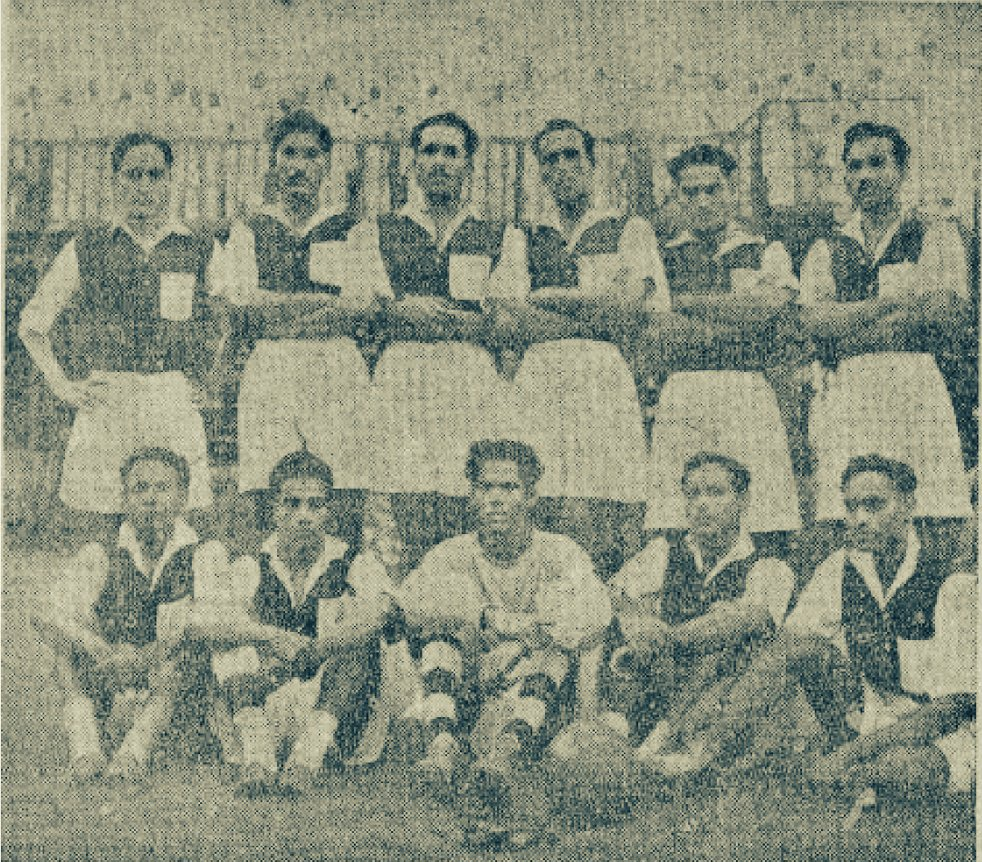
Dad (second from right, standing) with Mohammedan Sporting in 1948.

In the 1940s and 1950s, Muhammad was recruited to play for Mohammedan SC. Notably, he played a key role in the team's success in 1948, the season where Mohammedan Sporting became the first Indian club to win Calcutta League without losing a single match. Playing 24 matches, winning 20 and drawing the rest four. The same year, Dad, alongside teammate Muhammad Ramzan, were selected to represent an I.F.A. XI against the visiting Burma football team.

In 1949, Muhammad was a part of the Jinnah Gymkhana football team, which toured visiting countries Ceylon and Burma.

In 1955, he captained Karachi Kickers during their tour to south India, returning unbeaten after 32 games with 24 wins and 8 draws.

Muhammad also represented the Sindh football team at the National Football Championship in the 1950s.

== International career ==
In 1950, Muhammad was selected to represent the Pakistan national football team on their tour to Iran and Iraq.

In 1954, Muhammad featured in all three matches at the 1954 Asian Quadrangular Football Tournament.

== Personal life ==
Muhammad hailed from Lyari in Karachi. Muhammad's nephew Ali Nawaz Baloch represented the Pakistan national football team in the 1960s and 1970s. Nawaz's elder brother Abdullah Akbar and other brother, Ismail Roshu, were also footballers.
