= Abdullah Akbar =

Pakistani footballer

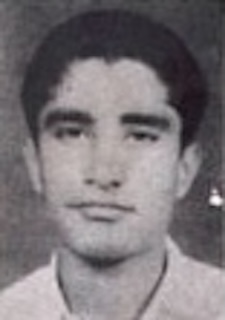

Personal information
- Full name: Abdullah Akbar
- Date of birth: 1945 (age 80–81)
- Place of birth: Karachi, Pakistan
- Positions: Forward; midfielder

Senior career*
Years	Team	Apps	(Gls)
1963	KMC		
1964–1965	Victoria SC		
1966–1970	EPIDC		
1971	KMC		
1972–1973	Pakistan Airlines		

International career
1967–1969	Pakistan	9	(1)
- * Club domestic league appearances and goals

Abdullah Akbar (Urdu: عبداللہ اکبر; born 1945) was a footballer who represented the Pakistan national football team during the late 1960s.

== Club career ==
Akbar's playing style was characterized as being fast, with his dribbling described as crisp and short. He began his professional career playing for KMC in 1963.

In 1964, he joined Victoria SC, helping them win the First Division League that year. The team were runner-up the following year.

Akbar then joined EPIDC, playing alongside his brother Ali Nawaz Baloch. He helped the club win First Division League in 1967, 1968, and 1970. During his time in the Dhaka League, he also represented the Dacca Division at the National Football Championship.

Towards the end of his career, Abdullah returned to his former club KMC. As well as Pakistan Airlines alongside his brother Ali Nawaz Baloch.

== International career ==
In 1967, Akbar was selected to represent the Pakistan national team at the 1968 Asian Cup qualifiers, where he played all three matches. The same year, he featured at the 1967 RCD Cup, being included in the starting line-up against both Iran and Turkey.

Two years later, he featured in the 1969 Friendship Cup. Where he played against Iraq and Iran. And later toured the Soviet Union the same year with the national team. He marked his last international appearances at the 1969 RCD Cup, where he scored against Iran in a 2–4 defeat, and appeared against Turkey.

== Personal life ==
Akbar was born in 1945, in Karachi, British India.

Akbar's uncle Dad Muhammad was also an international footballer in the 1950s. Akbar's younger brothers Ali Nawaz Baloch and Altaf Hussain, and older brother Ismail Roshu were also footballers.

== Career statistics ==
=== International goals ===
Scores and results list Pakistan's goal tally first, score column indicates score after each Akbar goal.

List of international goals scored by Abdullah Akbar
No.	Date	Venue	Opponent	Score	Result	Competition	Ref.
1	13 September 1969	Ankara 19 Mayıs Stadium, Ankara, Turkey	Iran	2–4	2–4	1969 RCD Cup	

== Honours ==
Victoria SC

- Dhaka First Division League:
  - Winners (1): 1964
  - Runners-up (1): 1965

EPIDC

- Dhaka First Division League:
  - Winners (3): 1967, 1968, 1970
