= Ayub Dar =

Pakistani footballer (born 1947)

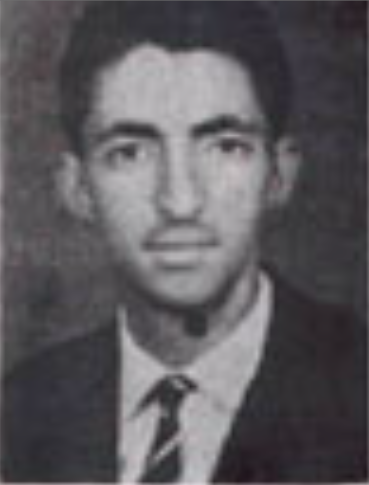
- Ayub Dar in 1967

Personal information
- Full name: Ayub Dar
- Date of birth: 5 December 1947 (age 78)
- Place of birth: Quetta, Pakistan
- Position: Right winger

Senior career*
Years	Team	Apps	(Gls)
1962–1963	Young Afghan Club		
1966–1967	Pakistan Western Railway		
1968–1969	EPIDC	17+	(34)
1970	Mohammedan Sporting		
1971–??	Pakistan Railways		

International career
1967–1974	Pakistan		
- * Club domestic league appearances and goals

Ayub Dar (Urdu: ایوب ڈار; born 5 December 1947) is a former Pakistani footballer, who played as a right winger. Ayub represented the Pakistan national team, and was the country's 25th international captain.

== Early life ==
Ayub was born on 5 December 1947 in Quetta, the provincial capital of Balochistan. His father, Muhammad Hussain, had migrated from Kashmir in 1919.

== Club career ==
=== Early career ===
Ayub completed his matriculation from Government Special High School Quetta, where he represented the school football team from 1962 to 1965. Ayub began his domestic football journey with Young Afghan Club Quetta in 1962–63.

In 1964, he was selected for the youth team of Balochistan, and the following year he was selected to the national youth team during a tour of Russia. In the five matches played there, Ayub scored a goal in every match.

=== Pakistan Western Railway ===
In 1966, Ayub was scouted by Jamil Akhtar, former captain of then North-Western Railway, and the Pakistan national team, after he spotted Ayub playing in the "All-Pakistan Commissioner's Cup" at Larkana, offering him a job in the Railway institution in Quetta. Where he would also represent the football team of the Pakistan Western Railway. With the assistance of Ayub's scoring prowess, Western Railways would go on to win the final of the "All-Pakistan Silver Shield Tournament", after an initial 2–2 draw in which Ayub found the net, they would defeat PIA by 2–0. They later won both the "All-Pakistan Floodlit Football Tournament" in Peshawar, and the "All-Pakistan Nishtar Memorial Football Tournament" in Karachi.

=== EPIDC ===
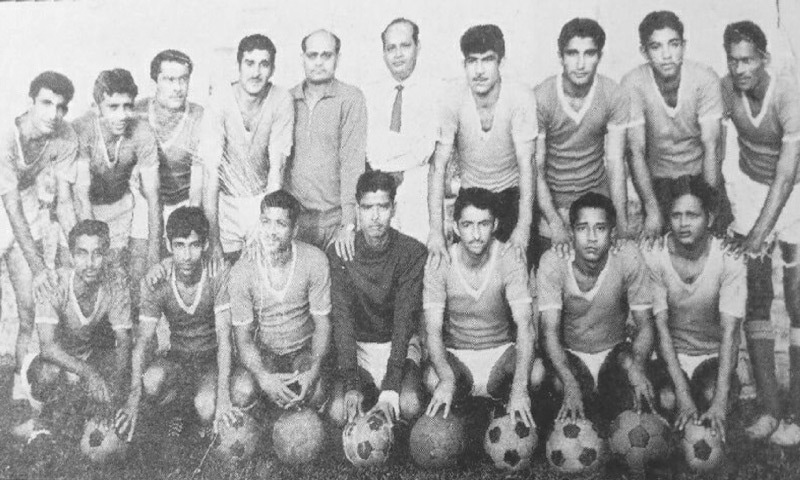
Ayub (third sitting from right) with EPIDC in the 1960s

In 1968, Ayub was recruited to play for EPIDC in the Dhaka First Division League in East Pakistan. During his first season, he scored 31 goals and guided the club to a consecutive league title as the top-scorer. EPIDC officials reportedly rewarded Ayub with Rs 10,000.

=== Mohammedan Sporting ===
In 1970, Ayub signed with Mohammedan Sporting, in exchange, EPIDC brought in Ali Nawaz Baloch from Mohammedan. However, the club would withdraw from the league after taking part in eleven matches, winning eight, and losing once.

The same year, he represented the East Pakistan football team during their King Mahendra Cup triumph in Nepal, and also recorded seven goals in a 9–0 victory against Nepal XI during the tournament.

=== Later career ===
Ayub returned to Pakistan Railways following the Independence of Bangladesh, and went onto represent the team until his retirement.

== International career ==
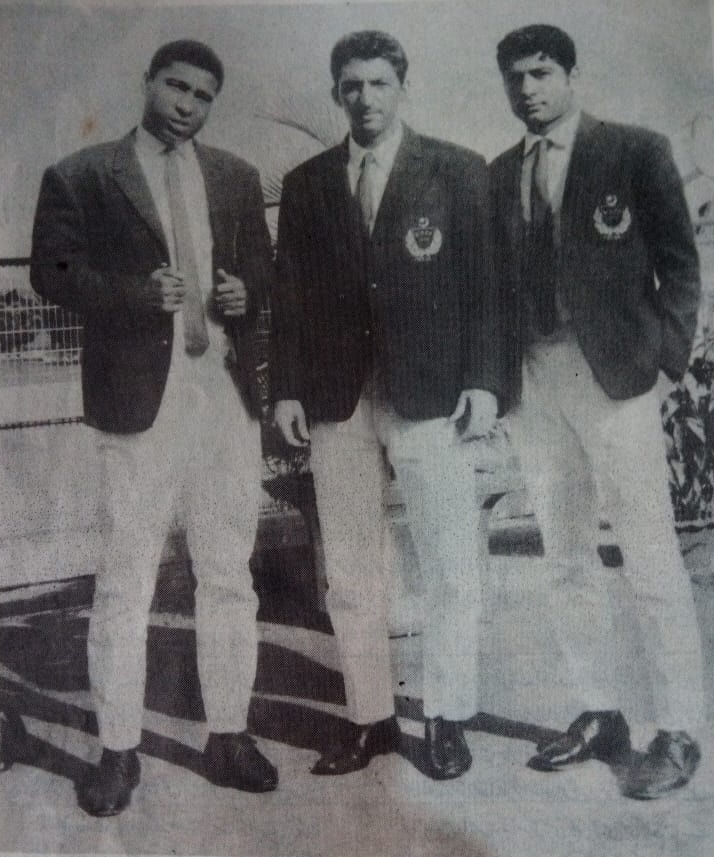
Ayub (centre) with Pakistan during the 1968 AFC Asian Cup qualification in Burma in 1967

In 1967, Ayub was selected for the Pakistan national team to play a series of friendly matches against Soviet club Alga in Karachi, Lahore and Dhaka.

Ayub also featured for Pakistan in four friendly matches in home against Saudi Arabia. He also participated in two friendly matches against Dallas Tornado in Lahore and Karachi. The same year, Ayub was praised by German coach Dettmar Cramer when he came to Pakistan to train the players at the invitation of the Pakistan Football Federation.

Ayub also found the net against Iran in a record 1–9 defeat during the 1969 Friendship Cup in Tehran. Six months later, Ayub again scored against Iran in a 2–4 defeat in the 1969 RCD Cup. At the 1974 RCD Cup, Ayub became the 22nd captain of the national team taking over from Maula Bakhsh, and despite being fit a year later, the national coaches made room for younger players.

== Career statistics ==
=== International goals ===
Scores and results list Pakistan's goal tally first, score column indicates score after each Ayub goal.

List of international goals scored by Ayub Dar
No.	Date	Venue	Opponent	Score	Result	Competition	Ref.
1	12 March 1969	Amjadieh Stadium, Tehran, Iran	Iran	1–8	1–9	1969 Friendship Cup	
2	13 September 1969	Ankara 19 Mayıs Stadium, Ankara, Turkey	Iran	1–4	2–4	1969 RCD Cup	

== Honours ==
EPIDC

- Dhaka First Division League:
  - Winners (1): 1968

East Pakistan

- King Mahendra Cup:
  - Winners (1): 1970

Individual

- Dhaka First Division League top scorer:
  - Winners (1): 1968, (31 goals)

== See also ==
- List of Pakistan national football team captains
