= Sanlı Sarıalioğlu =

Turkish footballer (born 1945)

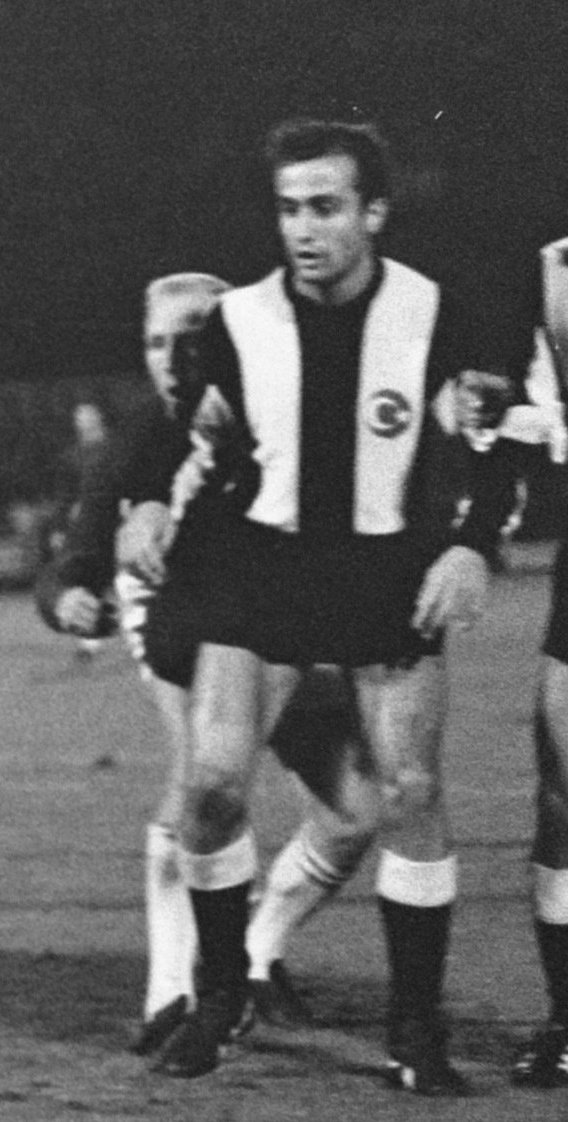
- Sarıalioğlu in 1966

Personal information
- Date of birth: 4 July 1945 (age 81)
- Place of birth: Istanbul, Turkey
- Height: 1.78 m (5 ft 10 in)
- Position: Striker

Youth career
- 1959–1962: Beşiktaş Amatör

Senior career*
Years	Team	Apps	(Gls)
1962–1975	Beşiktaş	314	(65)

International career
1963	Turkey U18	1	(0)
1965–1969	Turkey U21		
1964–1971	Turkey	21	(2)
- * Club domestic league appearances and goals

Sanlı Sarıalioğlu (born 4 July 1945) is a Turkish former footballer and current football columnist and TV pundit. He is a one-club man, served Beşiktaş for 14 years, his entire football career. Sarialioğlu captained Beşiktaş between 1968 and 1975. As of 2013, he writes in the sports section of daily newspaper Yeni Şafak.

== International career ==
Sarialioğlu played once for Turkey U18 national team on 6 November 1963, in a friend game up against Israel. He was called up 12 times for U21 level. He was capped 21 times for senior national team, scoring twice.

== Honours ==
Turkey

- RCD Cup: 1967, 1969

Individual

- Beşiktaş J.K. Squads of Century (Golden Team)
