= Sena Premachandra de Silva =

Sri Lankan footballer and rugby union player

S. P. de Silva
Personal information
- Full name: Sena Premachandra de Silva
- Date of death: 23 November 2024 (aged 84)
- Positions: Half-back; winger

Youth career
- Kalutara Vidyalaya

Senior career*
Years	Team	Apps	(Gls)
- Army

International career
- Ceylon
- * Club domestic league appearances and goals

Sena Premachandra de Silva (died 23 November 2024), commonly known as S. P. de Silva, was a Sri Lankan footballer and rugby union player who represented his country in both sports. He played football for the Army and the Ceylon national team, appearing as a half-back and winger. In rugby, he captained the Army team that shared the Clifford Cup in 1973.

== Early life and military service ==
De Silva attended Kalutara Vidyalaya, where he participated in football, cricket, athletics and volleyball. Brigadier P. D. Ramanayake helped recruit him into the Army as a footballer. He joined the regular force in 1961 and was posted to the 1 Field Engineer Regiment of the Sri Lanka Engineers. Initially a sapper, he later became a commissioned officer and retired in 1984 with the rank of lieutenant.

== Football career ==
=== Club career ===
De Silva represented the Army in domestic football, playing as a half-back and winger.

=== International career ===
De Silva played for Ceylon during the 1960s. He scored in the national team's 3–1 victory over Pakistan at the Sugathadasa Stadium in Colombo in 1965. With the score level at 1–1, de Silva headed in a pass from Edward Wickremasuriya fifteen minutes into the second half to put Ceylon ahead. Azeez Zainulabdeen subsequently scored the team's third goal.

In March 1968, de Silva was included in the eighteen-player squad for Ceylon's overseas tour under captain Mahinda Aluvihare. The tour included Olympic qualifying matches in Israel, followed by visits to West Germany and England. He appeared in both qualifying matches against Israel at Bloomfield Stadium, on 17 and 22 March, which Ceylon lost 7–0 and 4–0 respectively.

== Rugby union career ==
De Silva took up rugby in the Army in 1963, receiving coaching from Roy Tissera. He initially played as a centre and gained international selection in 1970, playing under Hadji Omar.

In 1973, he captained Army to a 19–19 draw against Police in the Clifford Cup final, with the two teams sharing the trophy. His late penalty kicking helped Army secure the draw. He also played at full-back in Army's 18–0 victory over Havelocks in the 1979 final.

== Later life and death ==
By 2002, de Silva was working in Kuwait. During a visit to Sri Lanka that year, he attended a gathering honouring Ramanayake's contribution to Army sport. In 2020, he was among eleven people named as life members of Sri Lanka Rugby.

De Silva died on 23 November 2024, at the age of 84 years. His military funeral took place at Borella Cemetery on 26 November.

== Career statistics ==
=== International goals ===
Scores and results list Ceylon's goal tally first, score column indicates score after each de Silva goal.

Documented international goal scored by Sena Premachandra de Silva
Date	Venue	Opponent	Score	Result	Competition	Ref.
28 February 1965	Sugathadasa Stadium, Colombo, Ceylon	Pakistan	2–1	3–1	Friendly	
