= Sardar Aslam =

Pakistani footballer (born 1945)

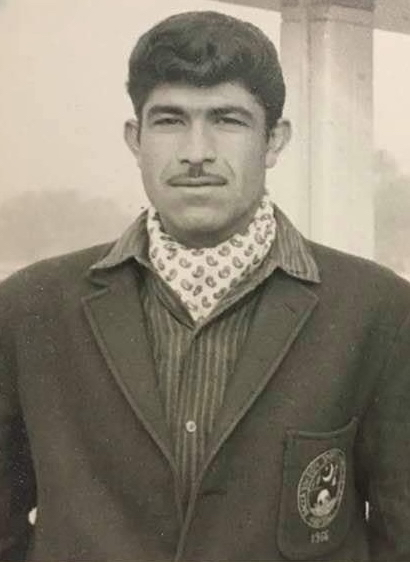
- Aslam in the 1960s

Personal information
- Full name: Sardar Mohammad Aslam
- Date of birth: 1945
- Place of birth: Quetta, British India
- Date of death: Unknown
- Place of death: Unknown
- Position: Striker

Senior career*
Years	Team	Apps	(Gls)
1960–1964	Afghan Club Quetta		
1965–1967	Dacca Wanderers		
1967–1970	EPIDC		

International career
1965–1969	Pakistan	10	(2)
- * Club domestic league appearances and goals

Sardar Aslam (Urdu: سردار اسلم; born 1945) is a Pakistani former footballer, who played as a striker. Aslam played for the Pakistan national football team between 1965 and 1969, and served as captain of the national team at the 1969 RCD Cup.

== Early life ==
Aslam was born in 1945, in Quetta, capital of the Balochistan Agency, British India.

== Club career ==
Aslam made his club debut for Afghan Club Quetta in 1960 at the regional Quetta Football League, and played for them till 1964. He also represented Quetta Division at the National Football Championship.

In 1965, Aslam transferred to Dacca League side, Dacca Wanderers. Eventually, he signed with EPIDC in 1967. During his stay in Dacca League, he also represented Dacca Division at the National Football Championship.

== International career ==
In 1965, Aslam was called up to the Pakistan national team for the 1965 RCD Cup, where he came on as a substitute against Iran and Turkey. He was selected again for the 1966 Asian Games, however, due to financial instability, Pakistan did not appear in the tournament. Aslam was a part of the team for the 1967 RCD Cup, where he appeared against Iran as well as scoring a goal in a 4–7 defeat against Turkey. He also represented Pakistan at the 1968 Asian Cup qualifiers, where he featured against Cambodia and Burma.

The following year, he took part in the 1969 Friendship Cup, where he made appearances against Iraq and Iran. Aslam served as the captain of the squad which participated in the 1969 RCD Cup. In the tournament, he featured against both Iran and Turkey, and scored a goal against the latter, this proved to be his last international appearance for the national team.

== Playing style ==
Aslam played as a striker. He was known for his strong physique and strong shooting power. Due to his build he could overpower opponents in duals.

== Career statistics ==
=== International goals ===
Scores and results list Pakistan's goal tally first, score column indicates score after each Aslam goal.

List of international goals scored by Sardar Aslam
No.	Date	Venue	Opponent	Score	Result	Competition	Ref.
1	28 November 1967	Dacca Stadium, Dacca, East Pakistan	Turkey	1–5	4–7	1967 RCD Cup	
2	10 September 1969	Ankara 19 Mayıs Stadium, Ankara, Turkey	Turkey	1–0	2–4	1969 RCD Cup	

== Honours ==
EPIDC

- Dhaka First Division League:
  - Winners (1): 1967

Dhaka Wanderers

- Dhaka First Division League:
  - Runners-up (1): 1966

== See also ==
- List of Pakistan national football team captains
