= Fariborz Esmaeili =

Iranian football (1940–2020)

Personal information
- Full name: Fariborz Esmaeili
- Date of birth: 1 July 1940
- Place of birth: Iran
- Date of death: 7 April 2020 (aged 79)
- Height: 1.60 m (5 ft 3 in)
- Position: Midfielder

Senior career*
Years	Team	Apps	(Gls)
- Taj SC

International career
1964–1968	Iran	14	(4)
- * Club domestic league appearances and goals

Fariborz Esmaeili (Persian: فریبرز اسماعیلی, 1 July 1940 – 7 April 2020) was an Iranian football midfielder who played for Iran in the 1964 Summer Olympics. He also played for Taj SC.

He died on 7 April 2020.

== Record at Olympic Games ==
National team	Year	Apps	Goals
Iran	1964	2	0
