= Ali Nawaz Baloch =

Pakistani footballer (1949–2022)

Ali Nawaz Baloch PP
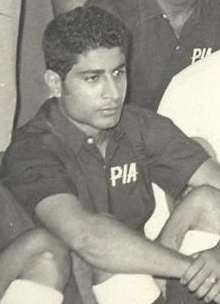
- Nawaz with Pakistan Airlines in 1971

Personal information
- Full name: Ali Nawaz Baloch
- Date of birth: 3 July 1949
- Place of birth: Lyari, Karachi, Pakistan
- Date of death: 28 October 2022 (aged 73)
- Place of death: Karachi, Pakistan
- Position: Striker

Youth career
- 1964: Baghdad Sports

Senior career*
Years	Team	Apps	(Gls)
1964–1965	Baghdad Sports		
1966–1967	KMC		
1967–1968	Pakistan Airlines		
1969	Mohammedan	15	(39)
1970	EPIDC		
1971–1979	Pakistan Airlines		
1975–1976	Emirates		

International career
1967–1974	Pakistan		(5)
- * Club domestic league appearances and goals

Ali Nawaz Baloch PP (Urdu: علی نواز بلوچ; 3 July 1949 – 28 October 2022) was a Pakistani professional footballer who played as a striker. Renowned for his goal-scoring abilities and hat-tricks, he is widely considered as one of the greatest Pakistani footballers of all time.

Rising through the ranks from school football, Nawaz represented clubs from Dhaka in East Pakistan and is one of the Pakistani footballers who represented clubs in the United Arab Emirates in the 1970s. He emerged as the top-scorer of the 1975–76 UAE Football League with Emirates SC. He later represented Pakistan Airlines in his later years. Nawaz also served as a coach in the United Arab Emirates for five years. Nawaz represented the Pakistan national football team from 1967 to 1974, captaining the team in the last year.

In recognition of his contributions to the sport, Nawaz was honored with the Pride of Performance Award by the Government of Pakistan in 1995.

== Early life ==
Nawaz was born in Lyari, Pakistan, on 3 July 1949.

== Club career ==
=== Early career ===
Nawaz started playing football since young. The school he attended, the Jamia Islamia Khadda Haji Sir Abdullah Haroon School, catered specially to aspiring footballers. He started his career with Lyari based club Baghdad Sports in the regional Karachi First Division Football League in 1964. He represented Karachi Division in the National Football Championship the same year.

=== KMC ===
Nawaz then joined departmental side KMC, and played in the DFA Karachi League in 1966. During his stay in the team, he received a meagre salary of 150 Pakistani rupees. In August 1967, he won the Mohammad Ali Bogra Tournament with the team after defeating Dhaka Mohammedan in the final. He also participated in the Ismail Gold Shield Football Tournament with the team.

=== Pakistan Airlines ===
In 1967, he became affiliated with the Pakistan Airlines departmental team. Two years later, in the 1969 National Championship held in Lahore, Nawaz helped the Karachi Division getting the second position. Nawaz also represented the team at the 1968 Aga Khan Gold Cup.

=== Mohammadan Sporting ===
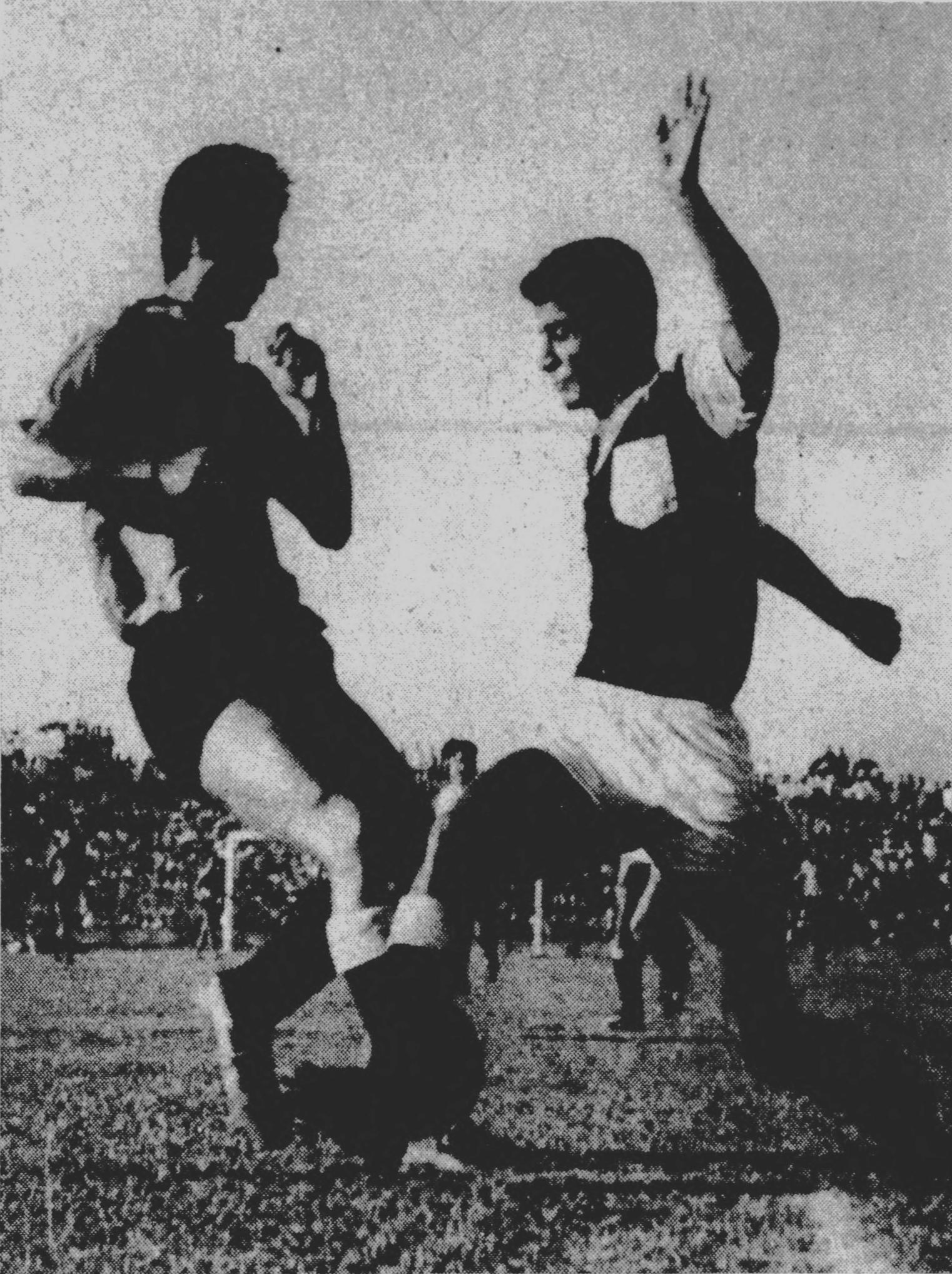
Nawaz (right) trying to win the ball, in a league match against Dilkusha in 1969.

In 1969, Nawaz was recruited to play for Mohammedan Sporting, due to his impressive goal-scoring abilities. In the 1969 Dhaka First Division Football League, he scored 39 goals of the club's 107 goals, finishing as top goal-scorer of the league. During his stay in the Dhaka League, he also represented Dacca Division at the National Football Championship.

=== EPIDC ===
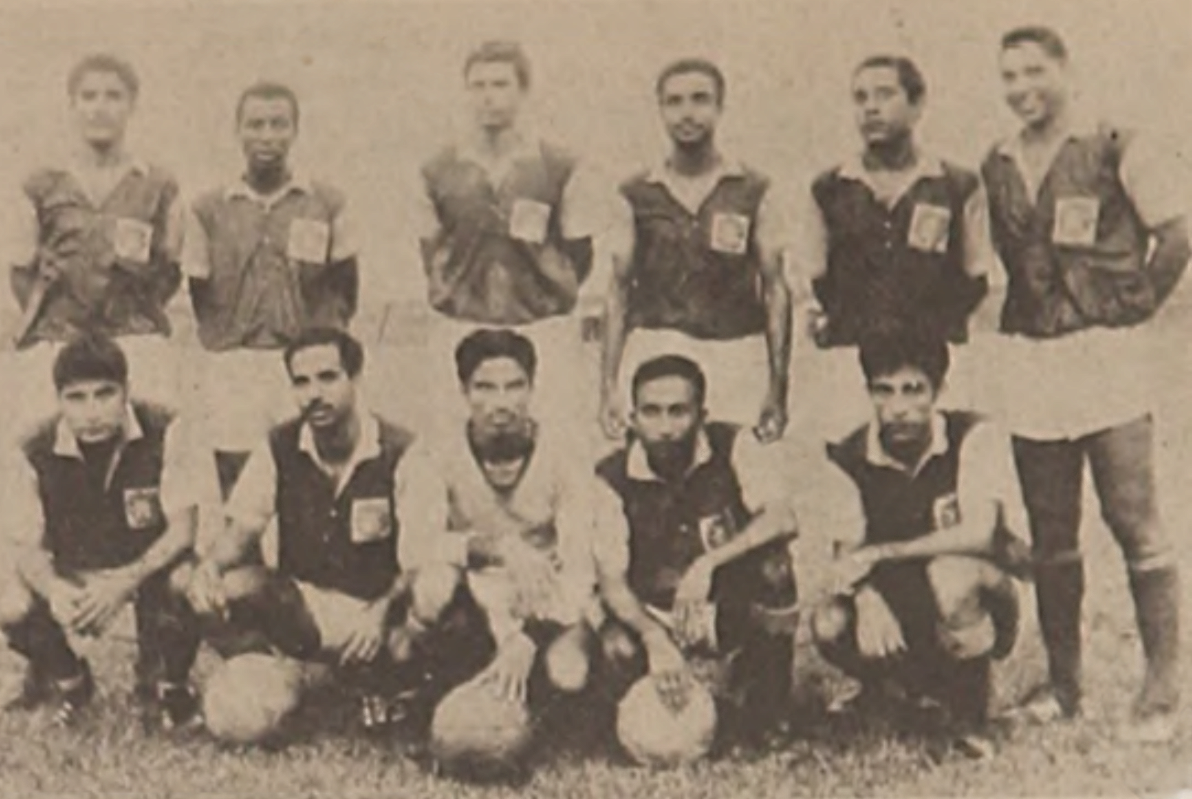
Nawaz (extreme left, sitting row) with EPIDC in 1970.

The following year, Nawaz moved to EPIDC, in exchange, Mohammedan Sporting brought in Ayub Dar from EPIDC. Nawaz, alongside several key players, such as his brother Abdullah Akbar, Abdul Ghafoor, Nazir Ahmed Chowdhury, Maula Bakhsh, helped the club win the league.

=== Return to Pakistan Airlines and UAE stint ===
Nawaz presenting the PIA team to a chief guest in 1975.

After the independence of Bangladesh in 1971, Nawaz returned to Pakistan Airlines.

During the 1970s, several local leagues were launched across the Middle East, where several Pakistani players represented club sides in these leagues and some of these players even coached the clubs’ new youth setups. Subsequently, Nawaz moved to the United Arab Emirates, where he featured for Emirates Club in the mid-1970s. In 1975, Nawaz had impressed the chairman of the club, Sheikh Khalifa Al-Awaisi with his game, and after settling all the matters, Nawaz moved to UAE with his son Javed Nawaz, the latter without the necessity of a passport, visa and any government restrictions. Nawaz played for the Abu Dhabi based club for five years. He emerged as the top-scorer of the 1975–76 UAE Football League season with 13 goals. He also played alongside national teammate Ghulam Sarwar at the club.

Nawaz played the last national championship for PIA in 1979, winning the league title five times during his stay at the club. He also played for local Karachi club Meher Sports FC during the 1970s.

== International career ==
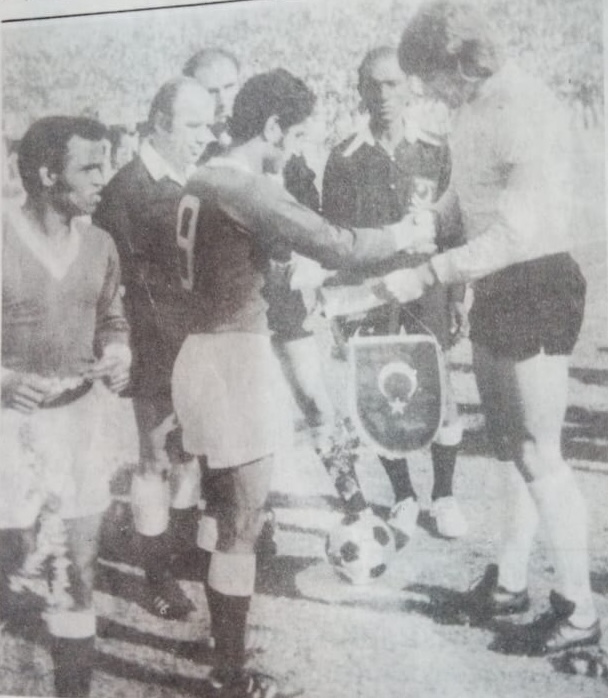
Nawaz (left) with Turkey national team captain at the 1974 RCD Cup.

Nawaz represented Pakistan from 1967 to 1974. On 10 March 1969, he scored his first international goal in a 2–1 victory against Iraq, at the 1969 Friendship Cup held in Iran. During the 1969 RCD Cup held the same year, he scored a goal in a 2–4 defeat against Turkey.

At the 1974 RCD Cup, he was selected as vice captain behind captain Ayub Dar. During Dar's absence, he captained in the second match of the tournament against Turkey, scoring the last goal in the eventual 2–2 draw. He last played with the national team at the 1974 Asian Games held in Tehran, in which Pakistan was defeated by Iran and Burma, but won against Bahrain by 5–1 where Nawaz scored two goals.

== Coaching career ==
Nawaz began his coaching career in the United Arab Emirates before returning to Pakistan where he was coach and manager of the Pakistan Airlines football team. He served as a coach in the United Arab Emirates for five years. Nawaz also took the Pakistan youth football team to UAE in 1993. In 2001, he was member of the coaching staff during the tour of the Pakistan national team to England.

== Personal life ==
Nawaz's uncle, Dad Muhammad, was a professional footballer in the 1940s and 50s, he also represented the Pakistan national team. Nawaz's elder brothers Abdullah Akbar and Ismail Roshu, and younger brother Altaf Hussain were also footballers. His uncle, Amin Baloch, was a prominent footballer in the Dhaka First Division League, and served as assistant coach of the Pakistan national team at the 1993 South Asian Games.

During his stay in the United Arab Emirates, Nawaz was offered nationality of the country, which he reportedly turned down. He returned to Karachi in 1980 after coaching in the gulf. He remained vice president of the Pakistan Football Federation for 16 years beginning in 1986 and as manager of sports in Pakistan Airlines football team, also coaching the club.

Nawaz has cited Diego Maradona as his idol, and was present in the crowd during the opening match of the 1990 FIFA World Cup in Italy, during a match between Argentina against Cameroon. He also served as the member of AFC Expert Committee from 1990 till 1993.

Nawaz was awarded the Pride of Performance Award from the Pakistan government in 1995, due to his contributions to the sport.

In his honour, the D Chaudhary Road in Lyari where the house in which Baloch was born, was renamed as Ali Nawaz Baloch Road on 4 August 2008.

Nawaz received the AFC Distinguished Service Award in 2013, which was presented by FIFA President Sepp Blatter and AFC President Salman bin Ibrahim Al Khalifa. He also served as member of the Sindh Football Association, and as match commissioner of the Pakistan Premier League in his late years.

On 28 June 2013, Nawaz's nephew Saqib Baloch who was a practising boxer was killed in Lyari, allegedly by the Pakistan Rangers.

== Death ==
Nawaz died on 28 October 2022 in Karachi. He had been in hospital for the past several days after suffering a brain haemorrhage. The KMC Stadium where Nawaz played often in the 1960s and 1970s while playing for the Pakistan national team and Pakistan Airlines saw a large gathering of former players, coaches, referees and officials in his funeral prayers.

== Career statistics ==
=== International goals ===
Scores and results list Pakistan's goal tally first, score column indicates score after each Nawaz goal.

List of international goals scored by Ali Nawaz Baloch
No.	Date	Venue	Opponent	Score	Result	Competition	Ref.
1	10 March 1969	Amjadiyeh Stadium, Tehran, Iran	Iraq	1–1	2–1	1969 Friendship Cup	
2	10 September 1969	Ankara 19 Mayıs Stadium, Ankara, Turkey	Turkey	1–2	2–4	1969 RCD Cup	
3	18 January 1974	Hockey Stadium, Karachi, Pakistan	Turkey	2–2	2–2	1974 RCD Cup	
4	5 September 1974	Amjadiyeh Stadium, Tehran, Iran	Bahrain	1–0	5–1	1974 Asian Games	
5	5 September 1974	Amjadiyeh Stadium, Tehran, Iran	Bahrain	4–0	5–1	1974 Asian Games	

== Honours ==
=== Mohammedan Sporting ===
- Dhaka First Division Football League:
  - Winners (1): 1969

=== EPIDC ===
- Dhaka First Division Football League:
  - Winners (1): 1970

=== Individual ===
- Dhaka First Division Football League top goal-scorer: 1969] (39 goals)
- UAE Football League top goal-scorer: 1975–76 (13 goals)
- Pride of Performance Award: 1995

== See also ==
- List of Pakistan national football team captains
