= Yılmaz Şen =

Footballer

Yılmaz Şen (1943 in Istanbul – 14 July 1992 in Istanbul) was a Turkish footballer who played as a defender for Fenerbahçe. He was famous as Gilette by his strong ability. He started his career with İstanbulspor where he played between 1962 and 1965 and then transferred to Fenerbahçe. He played there for ten years between 1965 and 1976. He played 18 matches for the Turkey national team.
