= ECO Cup =

ECO Cup RCD Cup(formerly)
- Organiser(s): RCD (1965–1974); ECO (1993)
- Founded: 1965
- Abolished: 1993
- Region: AFC/UEFA
- Teams: 7 (1993)
- Last champions: Iran
- Most championships: Iran; Turkey (3 titles each)

The ECO Cup was a football competition for members of Economic Cooperation Organization. Previously it was known as RCD Cup, RCD abbreviates Regional Corporation for Development and was an economic cooperation between Iran, Pakistan and Turkey from 1964 to 1979. A new organisation, ECO, was set up in 1985. In 1992, Afghanistan, Uzbekistan, Tajikistan, Turkmenistan, Kazakhstan, Kyrgyzstan and Azerbaijan joined ECO.

The countries that competed in one or more tournaments are Iran, Turkey, Pakistan, Kazakhstan, Kyrgyzstan, Tajikistan and Turkmenistan. Afghanistan and Uzbekistan never participated. Also Turkey did not participate in 1993 Tournament. 1993 was the last time this tournament was held.

== Tournament format ==
RCD Cup from 1964 to 1974 was a three nation tournament and it had a league format structure. ECO Cup 1993 was a seven nation tournament with two groups for a group stage, followed by semi-finals and final. There was no 3rd place match.

Year	Host	Winner	Runner-up	3rd Place
as RCD Cup
1965; Details	Tehran, Iran	Iran	Turkey	Pakistan
1967; Details	Dhaka, Pakistan	Turkey	Iran	Pakistan
1969; Details	Ankara, Turkey	Turkey	Iran	Pakistan
1970; Details	Tehran, Iran	Iran	Turkey Amateur (Note: Turkey sent the Turkey Amateurs team to this tournament.)	Pakistan
1974; Details	Karachi, Pakistan	Turkey	Malavan (Note: Iran sent Malavan F.C. to this tournament.)	Pakistan
as ECO Cup
1993; Details	Tehran, Iran	Iran	Turkmenistan	Tajikistan and Azerbaijan

== Medals (1965–1993) ==
Rank	Nation	Gold	Silver	Bronze	Total
1	Iran	3	3	0	6
2	Turkey	3	2	0	5
3	Turkmenistan	0	1	0	1
4	Pakistan	0	0	5	5
5	Azerbaijan	0	0	1	1
5	Tajikistan	0	0	1	1
Totals (6 entries)		6	6	7	19

== Summary (1965–1993) ==
Rank	Team	Part	M	W	D	L	GF	GA	GD	Points
1	Iran	6	14	9	2	3	30	13	+17	29
2	Turkey	5	10	7	3	0	26	11	+15	24
3	Azerbaijan	1	4	2	1	1	8	8	0	7
4	Turkmenistan	1	4	2	0	2	9	4	+5	6
5	Tajikistan	1	4	1	1	2	4	4	0	4
6	Kyrgyzstan	1	3	0	2	1	3	4	-1	2
7	Kazakhstan	1	3	0	2	1	3	6	-3	2
8	Pakistan	6	12	0	1	11	14	47	-33	1

== Participants ==
Nation	Total	Years
Iran	6	1965, 1967, 1969, 1970, 1993 and including Malavan F.C. in 1974
Pakistan	6	1965, 1967, 1969, 1970, 1974, 1993
Turkey	5	1965, 1967, 1969, 1970, 1974
Tajikistan	1	1993
Turkmenistan	1	1993
Azerbaijan	1	1993
Kyrgyzstan	1	1993
Kazakhstan U21	1	1993

== Comprehensive team results by tournament ==
Legend

- 1st — Champions
- 2nd — Runners-up
- 3rd — Third place
- SF — Semifinals (1993)
- R1 — Round 1
- — Did not enter / Withdrew
- — Hosts

For each tournament, the number of teams in each finals tournament (in brackets) are shown.

Team	(Iran) 1965 (3)	(Pakistan) 1967 (3)	(Turkey) 1969 (3)	(Iran) 1970 (3)	(Pakistan) 1974 (3)	(Iran) 1993 (7)
Azerbaijan						SF; 3rd
Iran	1st	2nd	2nd	1st	2nd	1st
Kazakhstan U21						R1
Kyrgyzstan						R1
Pakistan	3rd	3rd	3rd	3rd	3rd	R1
Tajikistan						SF; 3rd
Turkey	2nd	1st	1st	2nd	1st	
Turkmenistan						2nd

== See also ==
- Asian Football Confederation
- AFC Asian Cup
- AFF Championship
- EAFF East Asian Cup
- Arabian Gulf Cup
- SAFF Championship
- WAFF Championship
- CAFA Nations Cup
