= Muhammad Latif (footballer) =

Pakistani former footballer

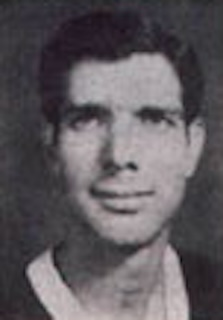
- Latif in 1967

Personal information
- Full name: Agha Muhammad Latif
- Place of birth: Lahore, British India
- Position: Goalkeeper

Senior career*
Years	Team	Apps	(Gls)
- Pakistan Western Railway

International career
1963–1967	Pakistan		

Managerial career
- 1993: Pakistan A
- * Club domestic league appearances and goals

Agha Muhammad Latif (Urdu: آغا محمد لطیف) is a Pakistani former footballer who played as a goalkeeper, and former manager. Latif is among the major goalkeepers of the Pakistan national football team in the 1960s, and captained the national side at the 1967 RCD Cup.

== Club career ==
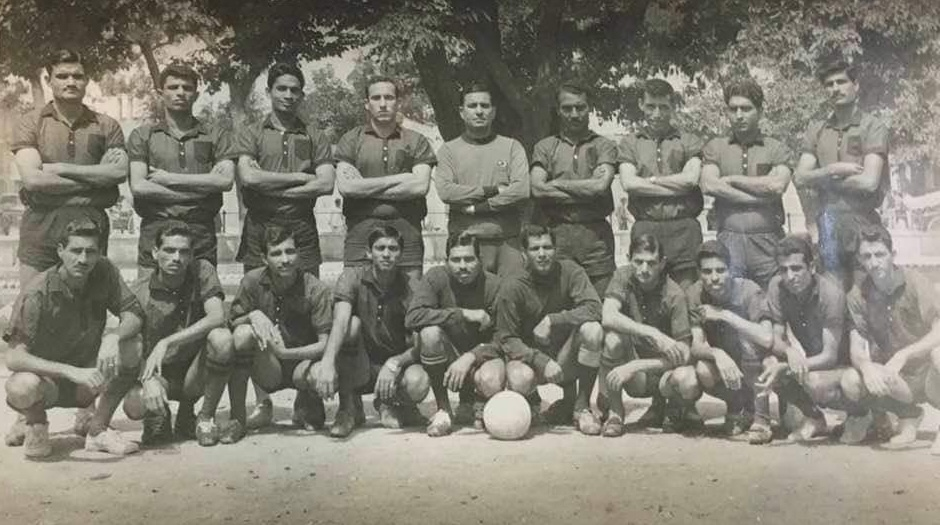
Latif sitting sixth from left with the Pakistan Western Railway team in 1969.

Latif represented Pakistan Western Railway at the National Football Championship, guiding the team to the title in 1969.

In 1966, Latif was suspended for one year by the "Pakistan Western Railway Sports Board" following his involvement in a walk-out during the 1966 National Football Championship final. Fellow teammates Talib Ali and Alam Butt were suspended for two years each, while team captain Younus received a four-month suspension.

== International career ==
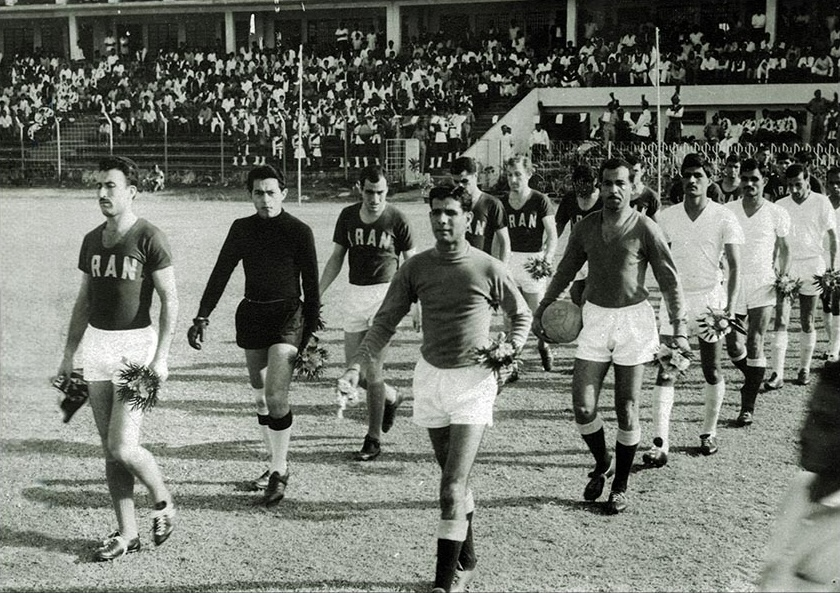
Latif leading the Pakistan national team at the 1967 RCD Cup

In October 1963, Latif was first selected for the Pakistan national team squad for the 1964 Summer Olympics qualification. In 1964 he toured China with the national team. He later played in 1965 during a tour to Ceylon, and later featured at the 1965 RCD Cup. After featuring in the 1968 AFC Asian Cup qualification in November 1967, he replaced Turab Ali as captain at the 1967 RCD Cup, starting in all two matches against Iran and Turkey.

== Post-retirement ==
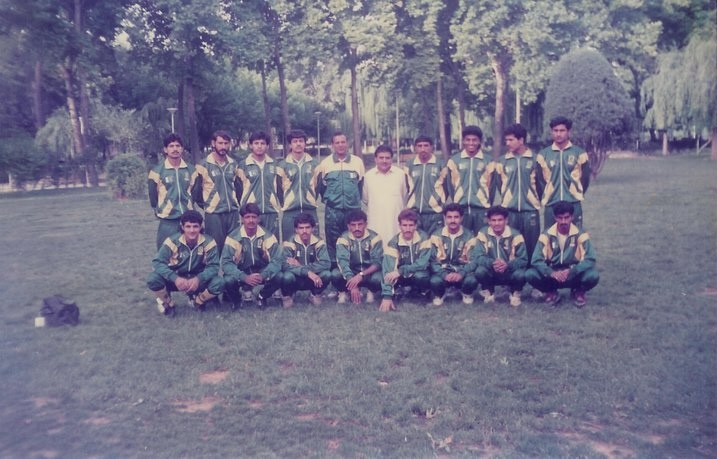
Latif standing fifth from left as coach of Pakistan A at the 1993 ECO Cup

In June 1993, the Pakistan Football Federation sent an alternate team, designated as "Pakistan A", to the 1993 ECO Cup held in Tehran, Iran, while the main national team was participating in the 1994 FIFA World Cup qualifiers. The ECO Cup squad was managed by Latif, along with former international Abdul Ghafoor Ajiz with him, while the main national team at the World Cup qualifiers was led by Muhammad Aslam Japani.

In 2008, he was named as general secretary of the Punjab Football Association. He held the position for the several ensuing years. In late 2010, Latif publicly addressed scheduling and registration concerns related to the DFA Lahore League, noting discrepancies with the Punjab Football Association’s official calendar.

== Honours ==
Pakistan Western Railway

- National Football Championship: 1969

== See also ==
- List of Pakistan national football team captains
