= Team BJMC =

Association football club in Bangladesh

- Full name: Team Bangladesh Jute Mills Corporation
- Nickname: The Jutemen
- Founded: 1963
- Dissolved: 2019
- Ground: BJMC Club Field; Dhaka, Bangladesh
- Owner: Bangladesh Jute Mills Corporation
- Chairman: TD Mitra
| Home colours | Away colours |

Team Bangladesh Jute Mills Corporation (Team BJMC) was a football club in Bangladesh that was mainly located in the city of Dhaka.

== History ==
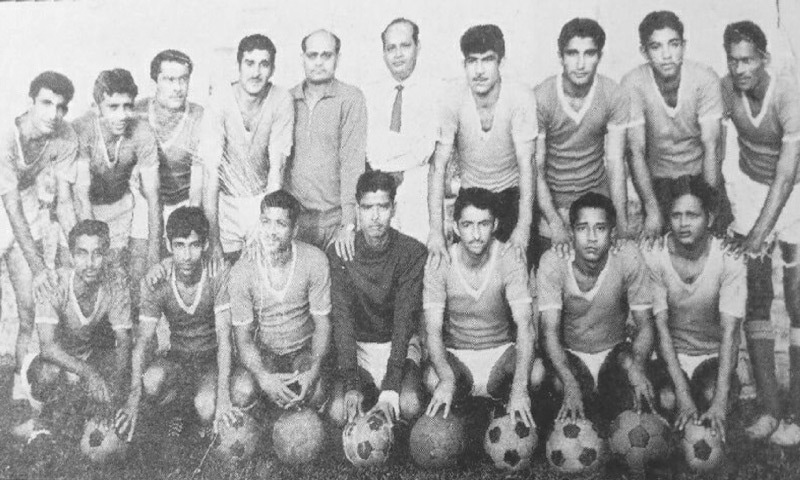
EPIDC team pictured in 1968

The club was formerly known as East Pakistan IDC prior to 1971 and Bangladesh JIC from 1971 until 1975, when the club was renamed as Team BJMC. In 1981, the club had stopped all their football related activities. However, after 29 years, in 2010, they restarted playing professional football under new manager Arif Khan Joy, a former captain of the Bangladesh national team. In 2019, Team BJMC was relegated from the Bangladesh Premier League, the top-tier association football league in Bangladesh and discontinued its football activities the same year.

The Bangladesh Jute Mills Corporation (BJMC), the football club's owner, said the club was being dissolved due to a lack of funds. “Around Tk5-6 crores is required to run a football team. We couldn’t even pay the dues for the players from last season. When we are having trouble paying wages to workers, how can we run [a] football team?” said the BJMC chairman, mentioning that around 1,800 BJMC workers had lost their jobs including athletes from different sports.

== Honours ==
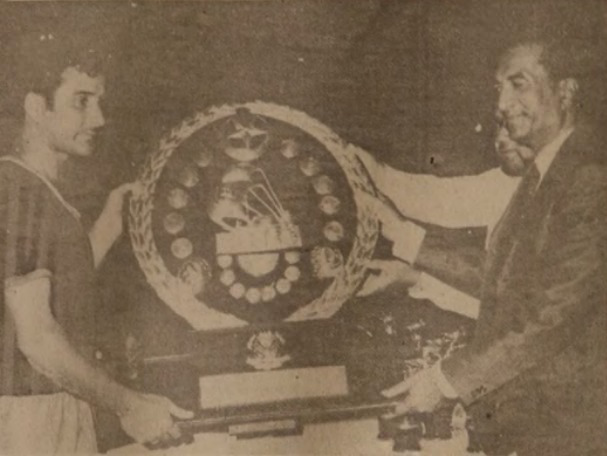
EPIDC captain Hashem Deen (L) receiving the Independence Day Football Trophy from EPSF president Sultan Ahmed in 1969

- Dhaka First Division League
  - Champions (5): 1967, 1968, 1970, 1973, 1979
- Dhaka Second Division League
  - Champions (2): 1965, 1988–89
- Dhaka Third Division League
  - Champions (1): 1964
- Independence Cup
  - Champions (1): 1975
- All-Pakistan Ismail Gold Shield
  - Champions (3): 1967, 1968, 1969
- Independence Day Tournament
  - Champions (3): 1967, 1968, 1969

== Notable players ==
- The players below had senior international cap(s) for their respective countries. Players whose name is listed, represented their countries before or after playing for Team BJMC.

Asia

- (Pakistan) Abdul Gafur Baloch (1966–68; 1972–73)
- (Pakistan) Mari Chowdhury (1966–67)
- (Pakistan) Abdul Jabbar (1966; 1969)
- (Pakistan) Ayub Dar (1968–69)
- (Pakistan) Ali Nawaz Baloch (1970)
- (Pakistan) Qadir Bakhsh (1970)
- (Pakistan) Maula Bakhsh (1970)
- (Pakistan) Abdul Ghafoor (1970)
