= Maula Bakhsh =

Pakistani footballer (1947 – 2021)

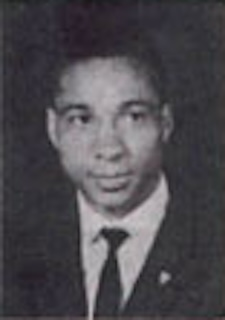
- Bakhsh in 1967

Personal information
- Full name: Maula Bakhsh Gotai
- Date of birth: 1947
- Place of birth: Lyari, Karachi, Pakistan
- Date of death: 30 August 2021 (aged 73–74)
- Place of death: Sharjah, United Arab Emirates
- Position: Forward

Senior career*
Years	Team	Apps	(Gls)
1960s	Karachi Port Trust		
1960s	Pakistan Airlines		
1968–1973	Dhaka Mohammedan		
1968	Mersin İdman Yurdu	2	(0)
1970	EPIDC		
1974–?	Al-Shaab		

International career
1965–1973	Pakistan		
- * Club domestic league appearances and goals

Maula Bakhsh Gotai (Urdu: مولا بخش گوٹائی; 1947 – 30 August 2021), alternatively spelled Maula Bux, was a Pakistani professional footballer who played as a forward. Bakhsh represented the Pakistan national team from 1964 to 1974, and captained the side in 1973. He was also one of the first Pakistani footballers to play professional football abroad, in Turkey and the United Arab Emirates.

== Early life ==
Bakhsh was born in Saifi Lane, in the Lyari locality of Karachi in 1947. He started playing football at an early age for the local Saifi Sports Club. A graduate of Karachi University, Bakhsh played for the NJV School and SM Government Arts & Commerce College school football teams until eventually getting selected for the Karachi Division youth team.

== Club career ==
=== Early career ===
Bakhsh was selected for the Karachi Youth Division in the National Youth Football Championship in 1966.

Bakhsh played for Karachi Port Trust and Pakistan Airlines departmental teams in the domestic setup in the 1960s, while representing the Karachi Division at the National Football Championship.

=== Dhaka Mohammedan ===
Like several notable players of West Pakistan, Bakhsh represented several clubs in East Pakistan at the Dhaka First Division League, where he played for Dhaka Mohammedan and EPIDC. During his stay in the Dhaka League, he also represented Dacca Division at the National Football Championship.

In 1969, Bakhsh received a suspension of two years from the East Pakistan Sports Federation, due to playing for Karachi-based club Karachi Port Trust, while still being registered to Dhaka Mohammedan.

=== Mersin İdman Yurdu ===
After making a good impression with the national team in a match against Turkey at the 1967 RCD Cup, on 6 April 1968, Bakhsh along with national teammate and fellow Lyari resident Abdul Jabbar signed for Turkish First Football League club Mersin İdman Yurdu. Bakhsh made two appearances with the team against Ankara Demirspor and Bursaspor during the 1967–68 Turkish First Football League. Both stayed at the club for six months.

Bakhsh had reportedly later claimed that both faced difficulties, and struggled to match the stamina and fitness required for the Turkish football team, due to lack of focus on the players' fitness level in Pakistan at the time.

=== Al-Shaab ===
During the 1970s, several local leagues were launched across the Middle East, where several Pakistani players represented club sides in these leagues and some of these players even coached the clubs’ new youth setups. Subsequently, Bakhsh moved to the United Arab Emirates, where he featured for Al-Shaab CSC in Sharjah in the mid-1970s, later also coaching the team.

== International career ==
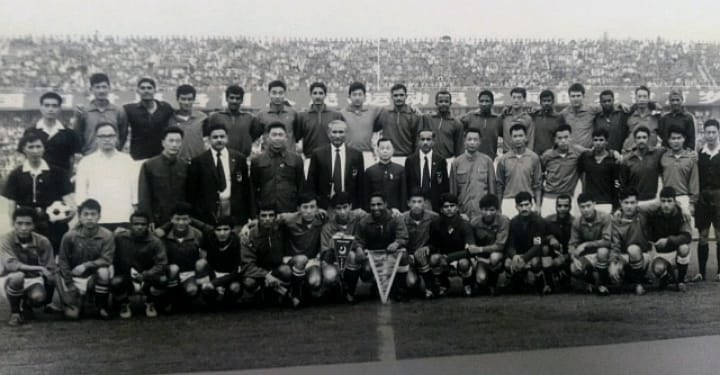
Bakhsh sitting in middle as captain of Pakistan during a tour to China in 1973

Bakhsh represented the Pakistan national football team from 1965 to 1973. Bakhsh captained the national side in 1973, when the national team toured the far east, which included several test matches against local teams and a friendly against China ending in a 4–7 defeat.

== Personal life and death ==
After retiring from football after his last spell in Sharjah, he settled in the United Arab Emirates, where he died on 30 August 2021 at the age of 73.

== Career statistics ==
=== International goals ===
Scores and results list Pakistan's goal tally first, score column indicates score after each Bakhsh goal.

List of international goals scored by Maula Bakhsh
No.	Date	Venue	Opponent	Score	Result	Competition	Ref.
1	21 March 1967	Sukkur Municipal Stadium, Sukkur, Pakistan	Saudi Arabia		2–4	Friendly	
2	15 November 1967	Bogyoke Aung San Stadium, Rangoon, Burma	India		1–1	1968 AFC Asian Cup qualification	

== Honours ==
=== Karachi Youth Division ===
- National Youth Football Championship
  - Winners (1): 1966 (shared)

=== Dhaka Mohammedan ===
- Aga Khan Gold Cup
  - Winners (1): 1968

== See also ==
- List of Pakistan national football team captains
