= List of Göztepe S.K. managers =

Göztepe S.K. are a Turkish multi-discipline sports club, founded in 1925, in İzmir, Turkey. Colloquially known by its football department, the club owns several titles in domestic competitions in Turkey, including 1 titles at Turkish Football Championship in 1950, 2 titles at Turkish Cup in 1968–69, 1969–70 editions, and 4 titles at TFF First League at 1977–78, 1980–81, 1998–99 and, 2000–01 seasons. The club also reached semi-finals at Inter-Cities Fairs Cup in 1968–69 edition, as well as quarter-finales of UEFA Cup Winners' Cup in 1969–70 season.

Below is the list of head coaches of football department of Göztepe S.K., including the respective honours achieved during spells.

== List ==
Name	Nat.	F	T	Honours	Notes
~~"1922–60"~~
András Kuttik	(Hungary)	1960	1961		(Note: The first foreign manager of club)
Adnan Süvari	(Turkey)	1961	1963		
Bülent Eken	(Turkey)	1963	1964		
Adnan Süvari	(Turkey)	1964	1971	2 Turkish Cup champions	
Dincă Schileru	(Romania)	1971	1972		
Sabri Kiraz	(Turkey)	1972	1973		
Suphi Varer	(Turkey)	1972	1973		Managed in place of Sabri Kiraz
Necdet Niş	(Turkey)	1973	1974		
Adnan Süvari	(Turkey)	1974	1975		
Oscar Hold	(England)	1975	1976		
Gürsel Aksel	(Turkey)	1976			
Nevzat Güzelırmak	(Turkey)	1976	1977		
Fevzi Zemzem	(Turkey)	1977	1978	1 TFF First League champions	
Tekin Yolaç	(Turkey)	1978	1979		
Kadri Aytaç	(Turkey)	1979	1980		
Halil Kiraz	(Turkey)	1980			
Nevzat Güzelırmak	(Turkey)	1980			
Fevzi Zemzem	(Turkey)	1980	1981	1 TFF First League champions	
Ilie Datcu	(Romania)	1981			
Ülkü Coşkuner	(Turkey)	1981			
Erkan Velioğlu	(Turkey)	1981			
Adnan Süvari	(Turkey)	1981	1982		
Zoran Ristić	(Socialist Federal Republic of Yugoslavia)	1982			
~~"1982–84"~~
Ilie Datcu	(Romania)	1984	1985		
~~"1985–86"~~
Coşkun Süer	(Turkey)	1986	1987		
~~"1987–89"~~
Fatih Terim	(Turkey)	1989	1990		
Nevzat Güzelırmak	(Turkey)	1990			
Ümit Kayıhan	(Turkey)	1990	1991		
Erkan Velioğlu	(Turkey)	1991	1992		
Ümit Turmuş	(Turkey)	1992	1993		
Fevzi Zemzem	(Turkey)	1994	1995		
Kemal Omeragić	(Bosnia and Herzegovina)	1996			
Hüseyin Hamamcı	(Turkey)	1996			
Erkan Velioğlu	(Turkey)	1996	1997		
Fevzi Zemzem	(Turkey)	1997			
Giray Bulak	(Turkey)	1997	1998		
Erdoğan Arıca	(Turkey)	1998	1999		
Oktay Çevik	(Turkey)	1999			
Jozef Jarabinský	(Czech Republic)	1999	2000		
Celal Kıbrızlı	(Turkey)	2000			
Ümit Kayıhan	(Turkey)	2000	2001	1 TFF First League champions	
Rıza Çalımbay	(Turkey)	2001	2002		
Ali Osman Renklibay	(Turkey)	2002			
Mustafa Fedai	(Turkey)	2002	2003		
Ayfer Elmastaşoğlu	(Turkey)	2003			
Cem Pamiroğlu	(Turkey)	2004	2005		
Oktay Çevik	(Turkey)	2005			
Sadullah Acele	(Turkey)	2005	2006		
Rıza Tuyuran	(Turkey)	2007	2008		
Mustafa Fedai	(Turkey)	2008	2009	1 TFF Third League champions	
Akif Başaran	(Turkey)	2009			
Erol Azgın	(Turkey)	2009	2010		
Nurettin Yılmaz	(Turkey)	2010			
Özcan Kızıltan	(Turkey)	2010	2011	1 TFF Second League champions	
Cihat Arslan	(Turkey)	2011	2012		
Hüseyin Kalpar	(Turkey)	2012			
Kemal Kılıç	(Turkey)	2012	2013		
Erhan Altın	(Turkey)	2013			
Özgür Zengin	(Turkey)	2013	2014		
Zafer Turan	(Turkey)	2014			
Suat Kaya	(Turkey)	2014			
Metin Diyadin	(Turkey)	2014	2016	1 TFF Second League champions	
Önder Özen	(Turkey)	2016			
Mehmet Aurélio	(Turkey)	2016			
Okan Buruk	(Turkey)	2016	2017		
Yılmaz Vural	(Turkey)	2017			
Tamer Tuna	(Turkey)	2017	2018		
Bayram Bektaş	(Turkey)	2018			
Kemal Özdeş	(Turkey)	2018	2019		
Tamer Tuna	(Turkey)	2019			
İlhan Palut	(Turkey)	2019	2021		
Ünal Karaman	(Turkey)	2021			
Nestor El Maestro	(Serbia)	2021	2022		
Stjepan Tomas	(Croatia)	2022			
Serdar Sabuncu	(Turkey)	2022			
Turgay Altay	(Turkey)	2022	2023		
Stanimir Stoilov	(Bulgaria)	2023	Current		
