= 1965 RCD Cup =

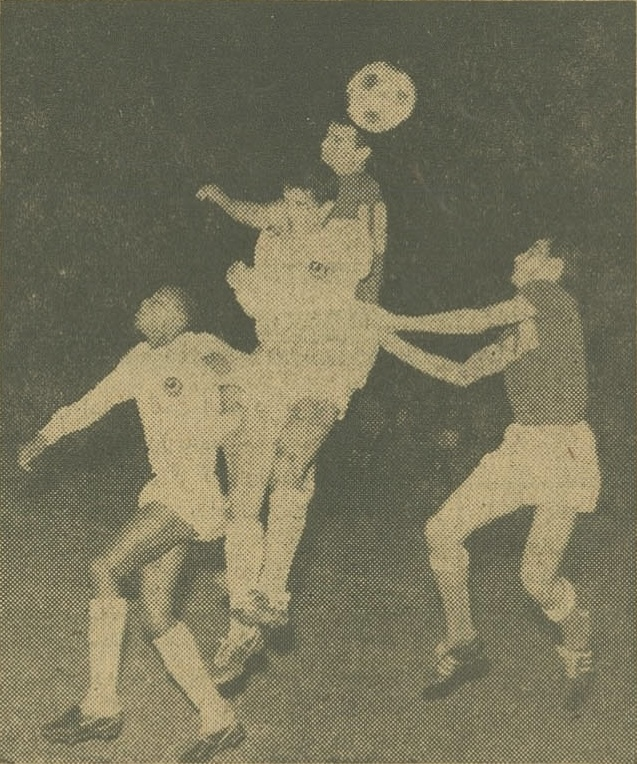
- Iran vs Pakistan at the 1965 RCD Cup

Tournament details
- Country: Iran
- Venue(s): Amjadiyeh Stadium, Tehran
- Dates: 21 July – 25 July; 16 March 1966 (Final replayed)
- Teams: 3

Final positions
- Champions: Iran (1st title)
- Runners-up: Turkey
- Third place: Pakistan

Tournament statistics
- Matches played: 4
- Goals scored: 9 (2.25 per match)
- Attendance: 57,000 (14,250 per match)
- Top goal scorer(s): (Iran) Homayoun Behzadi (Turkey) Ogün Altıparmak (2 goals)

The 1965 RCD Cup was the first edition of the RCD Cup. The event was held at the Amjadieh Stadium in Tehran, Iran. This was a three nation tournament played in league format between Iran, Pakistan and Turkey.

== Venue ==
Tehran is located in Iran	Tehran
Tehran is located in Iran	Amjadieh Stadium
Tehran is located in Iran	Capacity: 30,000

== Results ==
Pos	Team	Pld	W	D	L	GF	GA	GD	Pts	Final result
1	Iran	2	1	1	0	4	1	+3	3	Champions
2	Turkey	2	1	1	0	3	1	+2	3	
3	Pakistan	2	0	0	2	2	7	−5	0	

Source: RSSSF

== Matches ==
21 July 1965

Pakistan	1–3	Turkey
Saleem 80'		Ogün 5', 32'; Gürsel 18'

Amjadiyeh Stadium, Tehran
Attendance: ?
Referee: Said Sadri (Iran)

23 July 1965

Iran	4–1	Pakistan
Mostafa 17'; Jabbari 20'; Behzadi 70', 79'	Report	Umer 88'

Amjadiyeh Stadium, Tehran
Attendance: 27,000
Referee: Bagatter (Turkey)

25 July 1965

Iran	0–0	Turkey
	Report

Amjadiyeh Stadium, Tehran
Attendance: 30,000
Referee: Masudur Rahman (Pakistan)

=== Rematch ===
As the game between Iran and Turkey was abandoned on minute 85 of the match due to broken stadium light, a rematch was organised the following year.

16 March 1966

Iran	0–0	Turkey
	Report

Amjadiyeh Stadium, Tehran
Attendance: 27,000
Referee: Bruno De Marchi (Italy)

== Top scorers ==
2 Goals

- (Iran) Homayoun Behzadi
- (Turkey) Ogun Altiparmak

=== 1 goal ===
- (Pakistan) Muhammad Saleem
- (Pakistan) Muhammad Umer
- (Turkey) Gürsel Aksel
- (Iran) Mostafa Arab
- (Iran) Ali Jabbari

== Squads ==
=== Iran ===
Head coach: (Iran) Hossein Fekri

No.	Pos.	Player	Date of birth (age)	Caps	Club
1	GK	Aziz Asli	9 April 1938 (aged 27)		(Iran) Persepolis f.c.
2	DF	Mohammad Ranjbar			(Iran) Pas Tehran F.C.
3	DF	Parviz Ghelichkhani	4 December 1945 (aged 19)		(Iran) Kian F.C.
4	DF	Hassan Habibi (c)	7 February 1939 (aged 26)		(Iran) Pas Tehran F.C.
5	DF	Mehrab Shahrokhi	2 February 1944 (aged 21)		(Iran) Shahin F.C.
6	MF	Hassan Jamali			(Iran)
7	MF	Mostafa Arab	31 December 1942 (aged 22)		(Iran) Oghab F.C.
8	MF	Jalal Talebi	23 March 1942 (aged 23)		(Iran) Taj S.C.
9	FW	Akbar Eftekhari			(Iran) Taj S.C.
10	FW	Fariborz Esmaili	1 July 1940 (aged 25)		(Iran) Taj S.C.
11	FW	Homayoun Behzadi	20 January 1942 (aged 23)		(Iran) Shahin F.C.
12	MF	Ali Jabbari			(Iran) Shahbaz F.C.
13	MF	Nader Latifi			(Iran)
14	DF	Ezatollah Vatankhah			(Iran) Shahin F.C.

=== Pakistan ===
Manager: (Pakistan) Asghar Hussain

No.	Pos.	Player	Date of birth (age)	Caps	Club
	GK	Muhammad Latif			Pakistan Railways
	GK	Niaz Gul			Pakistan Air Force
	DF	Turab Ali	1943 (aged 22)		(Pakistan) Karachi Division
	DF	Syed Javid			(Pakistan) Peshawar Division
	DF	Samiuddin			(Pakistan) Dacca Division
	DF	Murad Bakhsh	1943 (aged 22)		(Pakistan) Dacca Division
	MF	Younus Rana	10 April 1941 (aged 24)		Pakistan Railways
	MF	Abdul Ghafoor	3 August 1938 (aged 26)		(Pakistan) Dacca Division
	FW	Muhammad Umer (c)	1935 (aged 30)		(Pakistan) Dacca Division
	FW	Faqir Hussain			Pakistan Air Force
	FW	Maula Bakhsh	1947 (aged 18)		(Pakistan)
	FW	Pratap Shankar Hazra	3 April 1943 (aged 22)		(Pakistan) Dacca Division
	FW	Muhammad Saleem	1942 (aged 23)		(Pakistan) Lahore Division
	FW	Muhammad Hashim			(Pakistan) Quetta Division
	FW	Ahmed Ali	7 March 1939 (aged 26)		(Pakistan) Quetta Division
	FW	Sardar Aslam	1945 (aged 20)		(Pakistan) Quetta Division
	FW	Riazul Haq			(Pakistan) Sargodha Division
	FW	Abdullah Rahi	1939 (aged 26)		(Pakistan) Dacca Division

=== Turkey ===
==== 1965 ====
Head coach: (Turkey) Doğan Andaç 1965

No.	Pos.	Player	Date of birth (age)	Caps	Club
1	GK	Yılmaz Urul	8 February 1942 (aged 23)		(Turkey) İstanbulspor
2	FW	Güven Önüt	10 February 1940 (aged 25)		(Turkey) Beşiktaş
3	DF	Muzaffer Sipahi	7 March 1941 (aged 24)		(Turkey) Ankara Demirspor
4	DF	Altan Tetik	1 July 1944 (aged 21)		(Turkey) Harp Okulu
5	DF	Çağlayan Derebaşı	21 October 1941 (aged 23)		(Turkey) Göztepe
6	MF	Nevzat Güzelırmak	1 January 1942 (aged 23)		(Turkey) Göztepe
7	MF	Talat Özkarslı	21 March 1938 (aged 27)		(Turkey) Galatasaray
8	MF	Coşkun Ferman			(Turkey) Ankaragücü
9	FW	Ergin Gürses	24 February 1942 (aged 23)		(Turkey) Muhafızgücü
10	FW	Gürsel Aksel	10 May 1937 (aged 28)		(Turkey) Göztepe
11	FW	Nedim Doğan	3 February 1943 (aged 22)		(Turkey) Fenerbahçe
12	GK	Ali Artuner	5 September 1944 (aged 20)		(Turkey) Göztepe
13	FW	Ogün Altıparmak (c)	10 November 1938 (aged 26)		(Turkey) Fenerbahçe
14	MF	Uğur Köken	28 November 1937 (aged 27)		(Turkey) Galatasaray
15	MF	Talat Yörük	1 February 1939 (aged 26)		(Turkey) Karagücü

==== 1966 ====
Head coach: (Italy) Sandro Puppo 1966

No.	Pos.	Player	Date of birth (age)	Caps	Club
1	GK	Turgay Şeren (c)	15 May 1932 (aged 33)		(Turkey) Galatasaray
2	DF	İhsan Büyükbuğdaypınar	9 November 1942 (aged 23)		(Turkey) Beşiktaş
3	DF	Fehmi Sağınoglu	16 April 1937 (aged 28)		(Turkey) Beşiktaş
4	DF	Muzaffer Sipahi	7 March 1941 (aged 25)		(Turkey) Ankara Demirspor
5	DF	Ercan Aktuna	26 June 1940 (aged 25)		(Turkey) Fenerbahçe
6	MF	Şeref Has	27 September 1936 (aged 29)		(Turkey) Fenerbahçe
7	MF	Talat Özkarslı	21 March 1938 (aged 27)		(Turkey) Galatasaray
8	MF	Onursal Uraz	26 March 1944 (aged 21)		(Turkey) Hacettepe
9	FW	Turan Doğangün	20 August 1941 (aged 24)		(Turkey) Galatasaray
10	FW	Ayhan Elmastaşoğlu	23 August 1941 (aged 24)		(Turkey) Galatasaray
11	FW	Nedim Doğan	3 February 1943 (aged 23)		(Turkey) Fenerbahçe
12	FW	Abdullah Çevrim	20 July 1941 (aged 24)		(Turkey) Gençlerbirliği
13	FW	Ogün Altıparmak	10 November 1938 (aged 27)		(Turkey) Fenerbahçe
14	FW	Fevzi Zemzem	27 June 1941 (aged 24)		(Turkey) Göztepe
