= List of Göztepe S.K. seasons =

Göztepe was founded on 14 June 1925 in the Göztepe/Güzelyalı quarter of İzmir after a split from Altay; the inaugural meeting adopted the club's traditional red and yellow colours and a striped shirt as the first kit. In 1937 the football branch merged with İzmirspor and Egespor under the name Doğanspor; some İzmirspor members opposed the move and formed Ateşspor in 1938. The team soon reverted to the Göztepe name (formally confirmed by a members' vote in 1940). The club's greatest era came under coach Adnan Süvari (1963–71): Göztepe won back-to-back Turkish Cups in 1969 and 1970 and the Presidential/Super Cup in 1970, and made deep European runs (1968–69 Inter-Cities Fairs Cup semi-final; 1969–70 Cup Winners' Cup quarter-final). The core XI of that side is still celebrated by supporters: Ali Artuner; Mehmet "Junior" Işıkal; Çağlayan Derebaşı; Hüseyin Yazıcı; Mehmet "Senior" Aydın; Nevzat "English" Güzelırmak; Nihat Yayöz; Ertan Öznur; Fevzi Zemzem; Gürsel Aksel; Halil Kiraz.

== Past seasons ==
=== Results of League and Cup Competitions by Season ===
Season	League table										Turkish Cup	UEFA	Top scorer	
Season	League	Pos	P	W	D	L	GF	GA	GD	Pts	Turkish Cup	UEFA	Player	Goals
1959	Süper Lig	4th	14	5	5	4	23	21	2	20	–	N/A	Gürsel Aksel	5
1959–60	Süper Lig	14th	38	9	14	15	35	41	−6	41	–	N/A	Gürsel Aksel	9
1960–61	Süper Lig	13th	38	12	10	16	40	53	−13	46	–	N/A	Gürsel Aksel	11
1961–62	Süper Lig	7th	38	12	17	9	46	42	4	53	–	N/A	Gürsel Aksel	19
1962–63	Süper Lig	13th	20	8	3	9	27	25	2	27	QF	N/A	Fevzi Zemzem	12
1963–64	Süper Lig	5th	34	14	12	8	39	31	8	54	R3	N/A	Fevzi Zemzem	17
1964–65	Süper Lig	4th	30	11	9	10	31	33	−2	42	R3	R1	Fevzi Zemzem	12
1965–66	Süper Lig	5th	30	12	8	10	33	27	6	44	R3	R1	Fevzi Zemzem	15
1966–67	Süper Lig	4th	32	14	10	8	47	31	16	52	RU	R1	Fevzi Zemzem	23
1967–68	Süper Lig	4th	32	13	9	10	46	34	12	48	R2	R3	Fevzi Zemzem	21
1968–69	Süper Lig	7th	30	9	12	9	30	26	4	39	W	SF	Fevzi Zemzem	25
1969–70	Süper Lig	5th	30	12	11	7	33	29	4	47	W	QF	Fevzi Zemzem	20
1970–71	Süper Lig	3rd	30	14	9	7	38	21	17	51	SF	R2	Ali Çağlar	12
1971–72	Süper Lig	9th	30	10	9	11	32	32	0	39	R2	N/A	Fevzi Zemzem	15
1972–73	Süper Lig	8th	30	11	8	11	33	31	2	41	R2	N/A	Fevzi Zemzem	16
1973–74	Süper Lig	13th	30	8	10	12	24	28	−4	34	R1	N/A	Mehmet Türken	11
1974–75	Süper Lig	14th	30	4	17	9	36	23	13	29	–	N/A	Mehmet Türken	11
1975–76	Süper Lig	15th	30	7	12	11	31	32	−1	33	SF	N/A	Mehmet Türken	13
1976–77	Süper Lig	15th	30	8	9	13	21	31	−10	33	QF	N/A	Ali Çağlar	8
1977–78	1. Lig	1st	31	21	6	4	70	24	46	69	R2	N/A	–	–
1978–79	Süper Lig	10th	30	9	10	11	30	41	−11	37	L32	N/A	Sadullah Acele	9
1979–80	Süper Lig	14th	30	8	11	11	27	33	−6	35	L16	N/A	Sadullah Acele	9
1980–81	1. Lig	1st	32	22	8	4	71	18	53	74	R4	N/A	–	–
1981–82	Süper Lig	16th	32	4	8	20	17	53	−36	20	L32	N/A	Sadullah Acele	5
1982–83	1. Lig	5th	30	14	8	8	31	19	12	50	L32	N/A	–	–
1983–84	1. Lig	4th	30	11	12	7	38	31	7	45	R2	N/A	–	–
1984–85	1. Lig	3rd	30	14	10	6	38	23	15	52	L16	N/A	Sadullah Acele	11
1985–86	1. Lig	5th	34	13	11	10	48	41	7	50	R3	N/A	Sadullah Acele	13
1986–87	1. Lig	7th	34	16	7	11	47	37	10	55	L32	N/A	Sadullah Acele	11
1987–88	1. Lig	5th	32	14	6	12	50	47	3	48	–	N/A	–	–
1988–89	1. Lig	5th	34	17	5	12	46	31	15	56	R1	N/A	Zafer Altındağ	10
1989–90	1. Lig	2th	32	18	9	5	58	32	26	63	R1	N/A	Tahir Karapınar	10
1990–91	1. Lig	2th	34	25	4	5	81	30	51	79	R2	N/A	Hüsnü Akın	23
1991–92	1. Lig	4th	34	14	11	9	48	42	6	53	R2	N/A	Yaşar Akçura	13
1992–93	1. Lig	9th	38	14	6	18	44	54	−10	48	R1	N/A	İsmail Alan	11
1993–94	1. Lig	4th	32	14	7	11	42	39	3	49	R1	N/A	–	–
1994–95	1. Lig	4th	32	14	7	11	42	34	8	49	R2	N/A	Ayhan Korkmaz	15
1995–96	1. Lig	7th	36	15	8	13	45	40	5	53	R3	N/A	–	–
1996–97	1. Lig	7th	32	10	10	12	41	44	−3	40	–	N/A	–	–
1997–98	1. Lig	6th	32	10	12	10	39	44	−5	42	–	N/A	–	–
1998–99	1. Lig	3rd	39	23	6	10	68	51	17	75	–	N/A	–	–
1999–00	Süper Lig	17th	34	7	5	22	26	54	−28	26	R3	N/A	–	–
2000–01	1. Lig	1st	38	24	7	7	30	17	13	79	–	N/A	–	–
2001–02	Süper Lig	7th	34	12	9	13	38	56	−18	45	R4	N/A	Mustafa Özkan	11
2002–03	Süper Lig	17th	34	5	11	18	32	57	−25	26	R3	N/A	Zafer Biryol	8
2003–04	1. Lig	17th	34	8	9	17	36	62	−26	26	–	N/A	Nedim Vatansever	10
2004–05	2. Lig	16th	32	6	7	19	35	60	−25	25	–	N/A	–	–
2005–06	3. Lig	11th	30	9	8	13	29	31	−2	35	–	N/A	–	–
2006–07	3. Lig	15th	30	8	4	18	21	47	−26	28	–	N/A	–	–
2007–08	Amateur	2nd	22	14	4	4	53	17	36	46	–	N/A	Oliveira Junior	38
2008–09	3. Lig	1st	36	20	11	5	48	29	19	71	–	N/A	Recep Gayık	10
2009–10	2. Lig	8th	36	13	11	12	33	30	3	50	R1	N/A	Ferhat Çulcuoğlu	6
2010–11	2. Lig	1st	34	22	8	4	70	27	43	74	R1	N/A	Tayfun Özkan	18
2011–12	1. Lig	13th	34	11	8	15	36	43	−7	41	R2	N/A	İlhan Şahin	11
2012–13	1. Lig	16th	34	10	7	17	28	40	−12	37	L16	N/A	Ali Kuçik	8
2013–14	2. Lig	2nd	38	21	12	5	57	30	27	75	R2	N/A	Şaban Genişyürek	17
2014–15	2. Lig	1st	34	19	12	3	57	30	27	69	R3	N/A	Timur Kosovalı	13
2015–16	1. Lig	13th	34	9	11	14	38	40	−2	38	R3	N/A	Gökhan Karadeniz	9
2016–17	1. Lig	5th	33	15	7	11	54	50	4	52	GS	N/A	Adis Jahović	21
2017–18	Süper Lig	6th	34	13	10	11	49	50	−1	50	R3	N/A	Adis Jahović	14
2018–19	Süper Lig	15th	34	11	5	18	37	42	−5	38	QF	N/A	Yasin Öztekin	10
2019–20	Süper Lig	11th	34	11	9	14	44	49	−5	42	L16	N/A	Serdar Gürler	7
2020–21	Süper Lig	10th	40	13	12	15	59	59	0	51	L32	N/A	Cherif Ndiaye	12
2021–22	Süper Lig	19th	38	7	7	24	40	77	−37	28	L16	N/A	Cherif Ndiaye	10
2022–23	1. Lig	7th	36	17	9	10	45	31	14	60	R5	N/A	Yasin Öztekin	9
2023–24	1. Lig	2nd	34	21	7	6	60	20	40	70	R5	N/A	Yalçın Kayan	9
2024–25	Süper Lig	8th	36	13	11	12	59	50	9	50	SF	N/A	Romulo	17

=== League participations ===
- Süper Lig: 1959–77, 1978–80, 1981–82, 1999–2000, 2001–03, 2017–2022, 2024-
- 1. Lig: 1977–78, 1980–81, 1982–99, 2000–01, 2003–04, 2011–13, 2015–2017, 2022–2024
- 2. Lig: 2004–05, 2009–11, 2013–15
- 3. Lig: 2005–07, 2008–09
- Amateur League: 2007–08
