= 1969 Presidential Cup =

- Event: Turkish Super Cup
Galatasaray	Göztepe
2	0
- Date: 29 June 1969
- Venue: Ankara 19 Mayıs Stadium, Ankara, Turkey

1969 Presidential Cup was the third edition of the national super cup of Turkish Football Federation. The match was contested between 1968–69 1.Lig champions Galatasaray and 1968–69 Turkish Cup winners Göztepe.

== Match details ==
1969 Presidential Cup
29 June 1969
Final

Galatasaray	2–0	Göztepe
76' Özdenak; 80' Celović	Report

Ankara 19 Mayıs Stadium, Ankara
Referee: (Turkey) Sebahattin Ladikli

Galatasaray:
1	(Turkey) Nihat Akbay
2	(Turkey) Ali Elveren
3	(Turkey) Akın Aksaçlı
4	(Turkey) Muzaffer Sipahi
5	(Turkey) Talat Özkarslı
6	(Turkey) Turan Doğangün
7	(Socialist Federal Republic of Yugoslavia) Ahmet Celović
8	(Turkey) Ergün Acuner	(substituted off) 23'
9	(Turkey) Gökmen Özdenak
10	(Turkey) Metin Oktay
11	(Turkey) Uğur Köken
Substitutes:
	(Turkey) Mazlum Fırtına	(substituted on) 23'
	(Turkey) Muhlis Gülen	(substituted on) 54' (substituted off) 54'
Manager:
(Socialist Federal Republic of Yugoslavia) Tomislav Kaloperović

Göztepe
1	(Turkey) Ali Artuner
2	(Turkey) Mehmet Işıkal
3	(Turkey) Halil Kiraz
4	(Turkey) Özer Yurteri	(substituted off) 72'
5	(Turkey) Mehmet Aydın
6	(Turkey) Ali İhsan Okçuoğlu
7	(Turkey) Nihat Yayöz
8	(Turkey) Ertan Öznur
9	(Turkey) Fevzi Zemzem
10	(Turkey) Gürsel Aksel
11	(Turkey) Mehmet Türkkan
Substitutes:
	(Turkey) Hüseyin Yazıcı	(substituted on) 72'
Manager:
(Turkey) Adnan Süvari

Assistant referees:
(Turkey) Cevdet Güvenli
(Turkey) Hamza Alan

== See also ==
- 1968–69 1.Lig
- 1968–69 Turkish Cup
