= 1968–69 Galatasaray S.K. season =

Galatasaray
1968–69 season
- President: (Turkey) Suphi Batur (until 18 January 1969) (Turkey) Selahattin Beyazıt
- Manager: (Socialist Federal Republic of Yugoslavia) Tomislav Kaloperović
- Stadium: Ali Sami Yen Stadium; Mithatpaşa Stadi
- 1.Lig: 1st
- Türkiye Kupası: finalist
- Süper Kupa: Winners
- Top goalscorer: League: Metin Oktay (17); All: Metin Oktay (21)
- Highest home attendance: 42,946 vs Fenerbahçe SK (Türkiye Kupası, 6 June 1969)
- Lowest home attendance: 12,672 vs Ankara Demirspor (1. Lig, 30 November 1968)
- Average home league attendance: 30,939
Home colours	Away colours

The 1968–69 season was Galatasaray's 65th season in existence and the 11th consecutive season in the 1. Lig. This article shows statistics of the club's players in the season, and also lists all matches that the club have played in the season.

== Squad statistics ==
No.	Pos.	Name	1. Lig		Türkiye Kupası		Süper Kupa		Total	
No.	Pos.	Name	Apps	Goals	Apps	Goals	Apps	Goals	Apps	Goals
1	GK	(Turkey) Yasin Özdenak	0	0	0	0	0	0	0	0
-	GK	(Turkey) Nihat Akbay	28	0	7	0	1	0	36	0
-	GK	(Turkey) Varol Ürkmez	4	0	2	0	0	0	6	0
-	DF	(Turkey) Muzaffer Sipahi	28	0	8	0	1	0	37	0
-	DF	(Turkey) Ergün Acuner	29	0	9	2	1	0	39	2
-	DF	(Turkey) Doğan Sel	0	0	0	0	0	0	0	0
-	DF	(Turkey) Erdal Tuncer	0	0	0	0	0	0	0	0
-	DF	(Turkey) Bekir Türkgeldi	2	0	0	0	0	0	2	0
-	DF	(Turkey) Tuncer İnceler	2	0	0	0	0	0	2	0
-	DF	(Turkey) Akın Aksaçlı	19	0	6	0	1	0	26	0
-	DF	(Turkey) Ali Elveren	13	0	5	0	1	0	19	0
-	DF	(Turkey) Ural Metiner	0	0	0	0	0	0	0	0
-	MF	(Turkey) Turan Doğangün	30	4	9	2	1	0	40	6
-	MF	(Turkey) Onursal Uraz	0	0	0	0	0	0	0	0
-	MF	(Turkey) Mehmet Oğuz	30	3	8	2	0	0	38	5
-	MF	(Turkey) Talat Özkarslı	24	0	7	0	1	0	32	0
-	MF	(Turkey) Mustafa Yürür	0	0	0	0	0	0	0	0
-	FW	(Turkey) Ayhan Elmastaşoğlu	28	7	7	1	0	0	35	8
-	FW	(Turkey) Uğur Köken	29	1	8	1	1	0	28	2
-	FW	(Turkey) Mazlum Fırtına	16	2	5	0	1	0	22	2
-	FW	(Socialist Federal Republic of Yugoslavia) Ahmet Celovic	6	3	3	2	1	1	10	6
-	FW	(Turkey) Atılay Özgür	3	1	0	0	0	0	3	1
-	FW	(Turkey) Ergin Gürses	5	0	2	0	0	0	7	0
-	FW	(Turkey) Muhlis Gülen	11	0	3	0	1	0	15	0
9	FW	(Turkey) Gökmen Özdenak	26	9	9	1	1	1	36	11
10	FW	(Turkey) Metin Oktay(C)	30	17	8	4	1	0	39	21

=== Players in / out ===
==== In ====
Pos.	Nat.	Name	Age	Moving from
GK	(Turkey)	Nihat Akbay	23	Beykoz 1908 S.K.D.
GK	(Turkey)	Varol Ürkmez	31	Altay SK
DF	(Turkey)	Muzaffer Sipahi	27	Ankara Demirspor
MF	(Turkey)	Mehmet Oğuz	18	Galatasaray A2
DF	(Turkey)	Akın Aksaçlı	21	Balıkesirspor
DF	(Turkey)	Ali Elveren	22	İzmir Denizgücü SK SK
FW	(Turkey)	Mazlum Fırtına	22	İzmir Denizgücü SK SK
FW	(Socialist Federal Republic of Yugoslavia)	Ahmet Celovic	28	

==== Out ====
Pos.	Nat.	Name	Age	Moving from
GK	(Socialist Federal Republic of Yugoslavia)	Tatomir Radunović	28	
GK	(Turkey)	Faruk Özceylan	20	Trabzonspor
DF	(Turkey)	Doğan Sel	32	Vefa SK
DF	(Turkey)	Erdal Tuncer	26	
MF	(Turkey)	Onursal Uraz	24	Şekerspor
MF	(Turkey)	Mustafa Yürür	30	İzmirspor
FW	(Turkey)	Yılmaz Gökdel	28	Vefa SK

== 1.Lig ==
=== Standings ===
Pos	Team	Pld	W	D	L	GF	GA	GD	Pts	Qualification or relegation
1	Galatasaray (C)	30	19	8	3	49	14	+35	46	Qualification to European Cup first round
2	Eskişehirspor	30	17	9	4	39	18	+21	43	Invitation to Balkans Cup
3	Beşiktaş	30	14	10	6	30	20	+10	38	
4	Fenerbahçe	30	13	9	8	34	25	+9	35	
5	Bursaspor	30	12	8	10	32	28	+4	32	

Rules for classification: 1) points; 2) goal difference; 3) number of goals scored.
(C) Champions

=== Matches ===
15 September 1968 1	Galatasaray SK	1–0	Vefa SK	Istanbul
15:45 EET	Ayhan Elmastaşoğlu 41'	(Report)		Stadium: Ali Sami Yen Stadium; Attendance: 27,508; Referee: Nejat Şener

22 September 1968 2	PTT SK	1–0	Galatasaray SK	Ankara
15:45 EET	Ertan Adatepe 18'	(Report)		Stadium: 19 Mayıs Stadı; Attendance: n/a Referee: Fehmi Pazarcı

29 September 1968 3	Galatasaray SK	1–1	Istanbulspor	Istanbul
15:30 EET	Ayhan Elmastaşoğlu 26'	(Report)	Kosta Kasapoğlu 34'	Stadium: Ali Sami Yen Stadium; Attendance: 30,161; Referee: Nejat Şener

6 October 1968 4	İzmirspor	0–2	Galatasaray SK	İzmir
15:30 EET		(Report)	Metin Oktay 44'; Ayhan Elmastaşoğlu 60'	Stadium: Alsancak Stadium; Attendance: n/a Referee: Cezmi Başar

13 October 1968 5	Eskişehirspor	0–2	Galatasaray SK	Eskişehir
15:00 EET		(Report)	Metin Oktay 6', 58'	Stadium: Atatürk Stadı); Attendance: n/a Referee: Ertuğrul Dilek

27 October 1968 6	Galatasaray SK	4–0	Altınordu F.K.	Istanbul
15:00 EET	Metin Oktay 2', 38'; Ayhan Elmastaşoğlu 25', 54'	(Report)		Stadium: Ali Sami Yen Stadium; Attendance: n/a Referee: Necdet Oralalp

3 November 1968 7	Galatasaray SK	2–0	Bursaspor	Istanbul
15:00 EET	Gökmen Özdenak 35'; Mazlum Fırtına 75'	(Report)		Stadium: Ali Sami Yen Stadium; Attendance: n/a Referee: Cezmi Başar

17 November 1968 8	Galatasaray SK	1–1	Fenerbahçe SK	Istanbul
14:30 EET	Metin Oktay 55'	(Report)	Abdullah Çevrim 85'	Stadium: Ali Sami Yen Stadium; Attendance: 40,000; Referee: Vaclav Davidek

24 November 1968 9	Gençlerbirliği SK	2–1	Galatasaray SK	Ankara
14:15 EET	Burhan Tözer 14'; İlhan Söyler 81'	(Report)	Metin Oktay 69'	Stadium: 19 Mayıs Stadı; Attendance: n/a Referee: Paul Schiller

30 November 1968 10	Galatasaray SK	1–0	Ankara Demirspor	Istanbul
14:00 EET	Metin Oktay 43' (pen.)	(Report)		Stadium: Ali Sami Yen Stadium; Attendance: 12,672; Referee: Luigi Grassi

15 December 1968 11	Göztepe SK	0–0	Galatasaray SK	İzmir
14:30 EET		(Report)		Stadium: Alsancak Stadium; Attendance: 22,915; Referee: Edgar Deuschel

21 December 1968 12	Galatasaray SK	1–0	Altay SK	Istanbul
14:00 EET	Roland Magnusson 58' (o.g.)	(Report)		Stadium: Ali Sami Yen Stadium; Attendance: n/a Referee: Cezmi Başar

29 December 1968 13	Galatasaray SK	2–0	Beşiktaş JK	Istanbul
14:00 EET	Turan Doğangün 12', 61'	(Report)		Stadium: Ali Sami Yen Stadium; Attendance: 40,000; Referee: Nejat Şener]

5 January 1969 14	Galatasaray SK	3–1	Mersin İdmanyurdu	Istanbul
14:30 EET	Ayhan Elmastaşoğlu 47', 85'; Ahmet Celovic 58'	(Report)	Ali Açıkgöz 4'	Stadium: Ali Sami Yen Stadium; Attendance: n/a Referee: Macit Sarıdana

11 January 1969 15	Galatasaray SK	4–2	Şekerspor	Istanbul
14:30 EET	Mehmet Oğuz 21'; Turan Doğangün 24'; Metin Oktay 49'; Gökmen Özdenak 81'	(Report)	Ata Özbay 30', 83'	Stadium: Ali Sami Yen Stadium; Attendance: n/a Referee: Walter Fercher

15 February 1969 16	Vefa SK	0–3	Galatasaray SK	Istanbul
14:45 EET		(Report)	Turan Doğangün 37'; Çetin Noyan 63' (o.g.); Metin Oktay 82'	Stadium: Ali Sami Yen Stadium; Attendance: n/a Referee: Faruk Talu

22 February 1969 17	Galatasaray SK	5–0	PTT SK	Istanbul
14:45 EET	Metin Oktay 1', 70'; Gökmen Özdenak 4', 52'; Mehmet Oğuz 87'	(Report)		Stadium: Ali Sami Yen Stadium; Attendance: n/a Referee: Ertuğrul Dilek

2 March 1969 18	Istanbulspor	0–0	Galatasaray SK	Istanbul
14:45 EET		(Report)		Stadium: Mithatpaşa Stadi; Attendance: 41,184; Referee: Eugen Boller

8 March 1969 19	Galatasaray SK	3–1	İzmirspor	Istanbul
15:00 EET	Gökmen Özdenak 39', 57'; Metin Oktay 46'	(Report)	İbrahim Ayhan 11'	Stadium: Ali Sami Yen Stadium; Attendance: n/a Referee: Karl Niemeyer

16 March 1969 20	Galatasaray SK	2–2	Eskişehirspor	Istanbul
15:00 EET	Atılay Özgür 46'; Metin Oktay 48' (pen.)	(Report)	Nihat Atacan 23', 25'	Stadium: Ali Sami Yen Stadium; Attendance: 35,297; Referee: Herbert Schram

23 March 1969 21	Altınordu F.K.	0–2	Galatasaray SK	İzmir
15:30 EET		(Report)	Metin Oktay 18'; Mazlum Fırtına 69'	Stadium: Alsancak Stadium; Attendance: n/a Referee: Mario Clematide

30 March 1969 22	Bursaspor	0–0	Galatasaray SK	Bursa
14:45 EET		(Report)		Stadium: Atatürk Stadı; Attendance: n/a Referee: Muzaffer Sarvan

6 April 1969 23	Fenerbahçe SK	1–0	Galatasaray SK	Istanbul
15:15 EET	Salim Görür 16'	(Report)		Stadium: Mithatpaşa Stadi; Attendance: 40,177; Referee: Gian Gaetano Vacchini

13 April 1969 24	Galatasaray SK	1–0	Gençlerbirliği SK	Istanbul
15:15 EET	Metin Oktay 49'	(Report)		Stadium: Ali Sami Yen Stadium; Attendance: n/a Referee: Joseph Heimann

20 April 1969 25	Ankara Demirspor	1–1	Galatasaray SK	Ankara
15:00 EET	Fikri Elma 19'	(Report)	Metin Oktay 60'	Stadium: 19 Mayıs Stadı; Attendance: n/a Referee: Danilo Bigi

4 May 1969 26	Altay SK	0–2	Galatasaray SK	İzmir
15:45 EET		(Report)	Gökmen Özdenak 50'; Metin Oktay 87'	Stadium: Alsancak Stadium; Attendance: n/a Referee: Cezmi Başar

11 May 1969 27	Beşiktaş JK	0–1	Galatasaray SK	Istanbul
15:30 EET		(Report)	Uğur Köken 76'	Stadium: Mithatpaşa Stadi; Attendance: 30,389; Referee: Erich Linemayr

14 May 1969 28	Galatasaray SK	2–0	Göztepe SK	Istanbul
16:00 EET	Ayhan Elmastaşoğlu 1'; Gökmen Özdenak 45'	(Report)		Stadium: Ali Sami Yen Stadium; Attendance: n/a Referee: Veli Necdet Arığ

18 May 1969 29	Mersin İdmanyurdu	0–0	Galatasaray SK	Mersin
15:15 EET		(Report)		Stadium: Tevfik Sırrı Gür Stadı; Attendance: n/a Referee: Cezmi Başar

25 May 1969 30	Şekerspor	1–2	Galatasaray SK	Ankara
15:30 EET	Cengiz Erkazan 69'	(Report)	Ahmet Celovic 22'; Gökmen Özdenak 58'	Stadium: 19 Mayıs Stadı; Attendance: 31,329; Referee: Walter Eschweiler

== Türkiye Kupası ==
Kick-off listed in local time (EET)

=== 1st round ===
30 October 1968 1	Kütahyaspor	1–3	Galatasaray SK	Kütahya
14:30 EET	Levent Saltuk 33'; Cemal 37'; Faik Bıkmaz 40'; Ali Öktem 89'	(Report)	Mehmet Oğuz 10'; Turan Doğangün 12', 39'	Stadium: Dumlupinar Stadı; Attendance: n/a Referee: Ziya Türkdoğan

13 November 1968 2	Galatasaray SK	2–1	Kütahyaspor	Istanbul
19:00 EET	Gökmen Özdenak 14'; Mehmet Oğuz 71'	(Report)	Kemal Keskin 44'	Stadium: Mithatpaşa Stadi; Attendance: n/a Referee: Nevzat Tansuk

=== 2nd round ===
26 February 1969 1	Eskişehirspor	0–1	Galatasaray SK	Eskişehir
14:45 EET		(Report)	Ergün Acuner 29' (pen.)	Stadium: Atatürk Stadı); Attendance: n/a Referee: Rudolf Schreiner

26 March 1969 2	Galatasaray SK	2–1	Eskişehirspor	Istanbul
15:30 EET	Ayhan Elmastaşoğlu 36'; Metin Oktay 44'	(Report)	Fethi Heper 8'	Stadium: Mithatpaşa Stadi; Attendance: n/a Referee: Cezmi Başar

=== 1/4 Final ===
21 May 1969 1	Altay SK	0–2	Galatasaray SK	İzmir
20:00 EET		(Report)	Metin Oktay 3'; Ahmet Celovic 10'	Stadium: Alsancak Stadium; Attendance: n/a Referee: Veli Necdet Arığ

28 May 1969 2	Galatasaray SK	2–0	Altay SK	Istanbul
20:00 EET	Metin Oktay 8'; Uğur Köken 43'	(Report)		Stadium: Mithatpaşa Stadi; Attendance: 18,788; Referee: Necdet Oralalp

=== 1/2 Final ===
6 June 1969 1	Galatasaray SK	2–1	Fenerbahçe SK	Istanbul
20:00 EET	Ergün Acuner 20'; Metin Oktay 78'	(Report)	Ogün Altıparmak 15'	Stadium: Mithatpaşa Stadi; Attendance: 42,946; Referee: Rudolf Kreitlein

=== Final ===
15 June 1969 1	Göztepe SK	1–0	Galatasaray SK	İzmir
20:30 EET	Ertan Öznur 26'	(Report)		Stadium: Alsancak Stadium; Attendance: n/a Referee: Cezmi Başar

18 June 1969 2	Galatasaray SK	1–1	Göztepe SK	Istanbul
20:15 EET	Ahmet Celovic 23'	(Report)	Nihat Yayöz 99'	Stadium: Mithatpaşa Stadi; Attendance: 24,830; Referee: Ferdinand Biwersi

== Süper Kupa ==
Kick-off listed in local time (EET)

29 June 1969	Galatasaray SK	2–0	Göztepe SK	Ankara
17:00 EET	Gökmen Özdenak 76'; Ahmet Celovic 80'	(Report)		Stadium: 19 Mayıs Stadı; Attendance: n/a Referee: Sabahattin Ladikli

== Friendly Matches ==
2 February 1969	Beşiktaş JK	1–0	Galatasaray SK	Istanbul
15:00 EET	Ahmet Şahin 74'	(Report)		Stadium: Mithatpaşa Stadi; Attendance: 13,365; Referee: Hüseyin Maloğlu

=== Spor Toto Kupası ===
10 August 1968 1	Vefa SK	2–0	Galatasaray SK	Istanbul
17:00 EET	Zeki Temizer 61'; Yılmaz Gökdel 88'	(Report)		Stadium: Ali Sami Yen Stadium; Attendance: 16,174; Referee: Faruk Talu

18 August 1968 2	Galatasaray SK	0–0	Beşiktaş JK	Istanbul
17:00 EET		(Report)		Stadium: Ali Sami Yen Stadium; Attendance: n/a Referee: Faruk Talu

=== Ali Sami Yen-Galip Kulaksızoğlu Kupası ===
24 August 1968	Galatasaray SK	0–0	Fenerbahçe SK	Istanbul
15:00 EET		(Report)		Stadium: Ali Sami Yen Stadium; Attendance: n/a Referee: Rıfat Atakanı

== Attendance ==
Competition	Av. Att.	Total Att.
1. Lig	30,939	185,638
Türkiye Kupası	28,855	86,564
Total	30,245	272,202
