= Gürsel Aksel Stadium =

Association football stadium in İzmir, Turkey

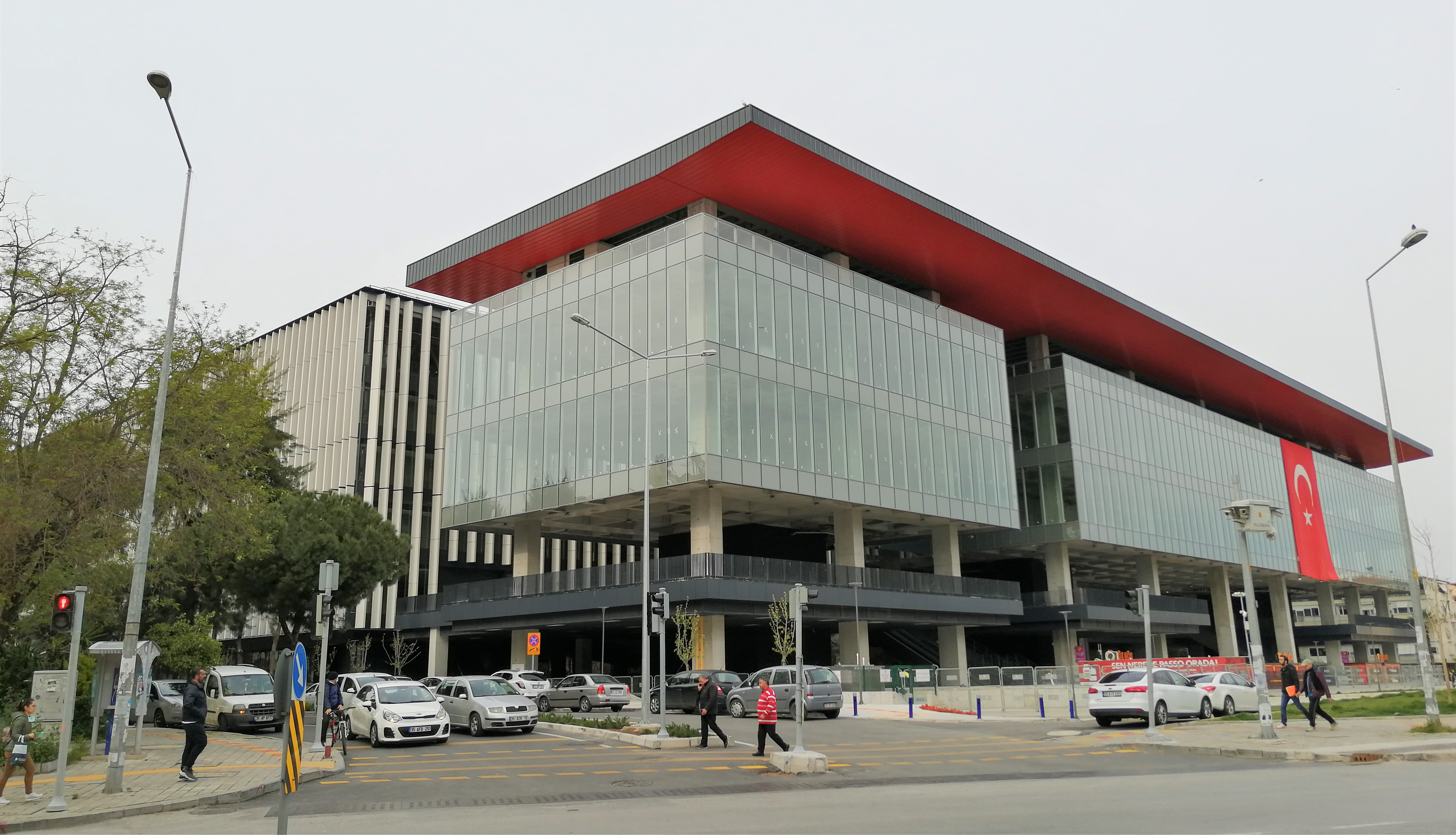

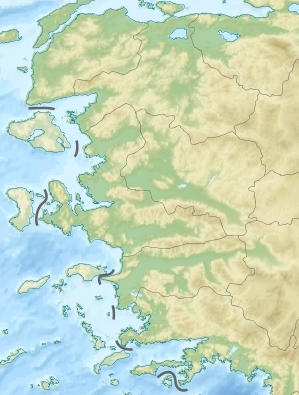
- Location in Western Turkey Location in Turkey
- Full name: Gürsel Aksel Spor ve Sağlıklı Yaşam Merkezi
- Location: Konak, İzmir, Turkey
- Coordinates: 38.396821°N 27.075950°E
- Capacity: 23,376 Capacity history: 19,713 (2018–2024) 20,756 (2024–2025) 23,376 (2025–)
- Executive suites: 41
- Surface: Grass
- Record attendance: 19,472 (Göztepe–Beşiktaş, 19 September 2025)
- Field size: 105 m × 68 m (344 ft × 223 ft)

Construction
- Groundbreaking: 9 September 2017
- Built: 2017–2019
- Opened: 26 January 2020
- Cost: ₺218,900,000.00
- Architect: DBArchitects
- General contractor: TOKI
- Main contractor: Rönesans Holding

Tenants
- Göztepe S.K. Turkey national football team (selected matches)

The Gürsel Aksel Stadium at the Gürsel Aksel Sports and Healthy Life Center (Turkish: Gürsel Aksel Spor ve Sağlıklı Yaşam Merkezi) is a football stadium located in Üçkuyular, Göztepe, a neighbourhood in the Konak district of İzmir, Turkey. The stadium is the home ground of İzmir-based sports club Göztepe S.K.

The stadium is commemorated after Gürsel Aksel who served entirely to club during his professional career, officially dubbed as "the great captain" by the club.

== History ==
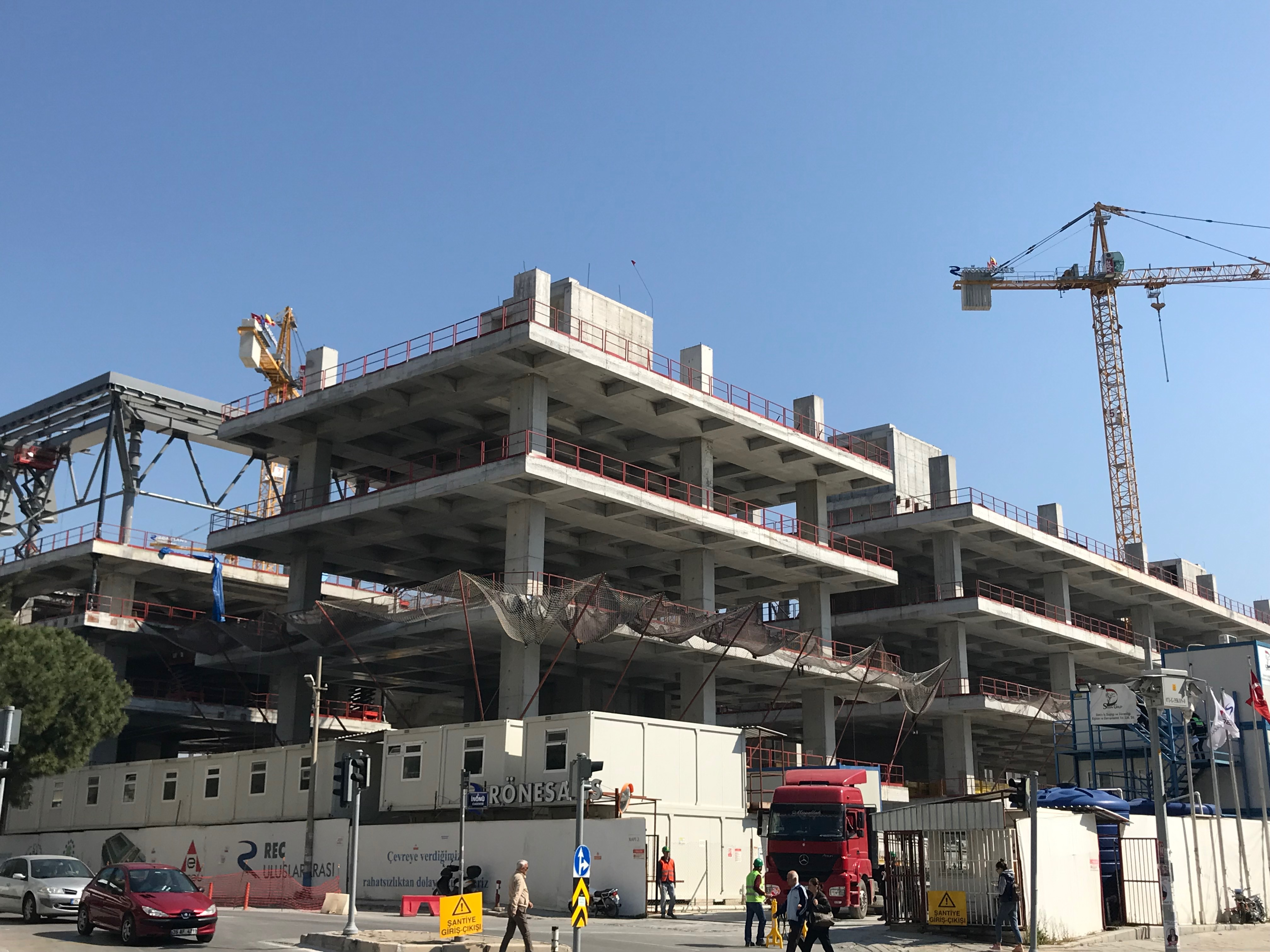
Construction site in March 2019

Göztepe S.K. announced their agreement with TOKI, governmental housing agency of Turkey, for construction of a stadium on 22 February 2017. Groundbreaking of stadium was 9 September 2017. Stadium is planned to be built total of 12 thousand m^{2}. Initial projected capacity of stadium was announced as 20,035. In July 2019, projected capacity was increased up to 25,035. In 2020, the construction cost of the stadium was reported by Anadolu Agency as 218,900,000.00 ₺.

The first ever season tickets of the stadium were released on 8 November 2019, covering the second half of the 2019–20 Süper Lig season.

The stadium was opened on 26 January 2020, Monday, at 16:00 local time, at the week 19 game of 2019–20 Süper Lig season, between Göztepe and Beşiktaş J.K. The game ended 2–1 in favour of Göztepe S.K. On 25th minute of the game, Halil Akbunar scored the first goal ever scored in Gürsel Aksel Stadium. 17,855 spectators attended the opening game.

Turkish Football Federation announced their decision on 14 April 2021, revealing that 2020–21 Turkish Cup Final to take place at Gürsel Aksel Stadium. Played on 18 May 2021 between Antalyaspor and Beşiktaş, the game ended with 0–2 final score, sealing the cup title of Beşiktaş.

On 11 June 2023, the stadium hosted the 2023 Turkish Cup final, which was played between Fenerbahçe and İstanbul Başakşehir. Fenerbahçe won the match 2–0.

== Facilities ==
Final layout of Gürsel Aksel Stadium lies on 34.651 m^{2} of building area with a total construction presence of 94.541 m^{2}. There is the official sports museum of Göztepe S.K., exhibition halls, food courts and a parking garage located inside and underground of the stadium. On the roof of stadium, there is a 650 metres long walking track built.

== Transportation ==
As of 2020 information, stadium is accessible via ESHOT bus services with related connections of bus numbers 5, 6, 7, 24, 25 and 480 from Balçova, Narlıdere districts and Kavacık and Oyunlar Köyü neighbourhoods, bus number 486 from Oyak Sitesi neighbourhood, bus numbers 17, 650, 671, 690 and 873 from surrounding high ways, bus number 510 from Gaziemir district, bus number 202 from Adnan Menderes Airport.
