= List of Kasımpaşa S.K. managers =

This is a list of all managers of Kasımpaşa, including honours.

== Managers ==
Nat.	Name	From	To	Notes	Ref			
Nat.	Name	From	To	(Turkey)	Ref	Eşref Bilgiç	1953	1956
(Turkey)	Mehmet Reşat Nayır	1956	1957					
(Turkey)	Cihat Arman	1957	1959					
(Turkey)	Recep Adanır	1959	1960	caretaker manager				
(Turkey)	Rebii Erkal	1960						
(Turkey)	Burhan Sümersan	1961						
(Italy)	Renato Vignolini	1961	1963					
(Turkey)	Esat Kaner	1963	1964					
(Italy)	Renato Vignolini	1964						
~~1964-1972~~
(Turkey)	Fehmi Sağınoğlu	1972						
~~1972-1988~~
(Turkey)	Cihat Erbil	1988	1989	1 TFF Third League champions				
(Turkey)	Ali Yavaş	1989						
~~1989-1992~~
(Turkey)	Nail Çetin Noyan	1992	1993					
(Turkey)	Ömer Gülen	1993	1994					
~~1994-1995~~
(Turkey)	Nevruz Şerif	1995						
(Turkey)	İsmail Demiriz	1995	1996					
(Turkey)	Mehmet Şansal	1996	1998	1 TFF Third League champions				
(Turkey)	Ergun Ortakçı	1998	1999					
(Turkey)	Mehmet Şansal	1999						
(Turkey)	Nevruz Şerif	1999	2000					
(Turkey)	Ethem Adlığ	2000						
~~2000-2002~~
(Turkey)	İlhami Şarkan	2002	2003					
(Turkey)	Hasan Vezir	2003	2004					
~~2004-2005~~
(Turkey)	Akif Başaran	2005		1 TFF Third League champions				
(Turkey)	Abdülkerim Durmaz	2005						
~~2005-2006~~
(Turkey)	Akif Başaran	2006	2007					
(Turkey)	Kadir Özcan	2007						
(Turkey)	Serdar Dayat	2007		caretaker manager				
(Germany)	Werner Lorant	2007						
(Turkey)	Cihat Arslan	2007		caretaker manager				
(Turkey)	Uğur Tütüneker	2007	2009					
(Turkey)	Besim Durmuş	2009						
(Turkey)	Yılmaz Vural	2009	2011					
(Turkey)	Fuat Çapa	2011						
(Turkey)	Uğur Tütüneker	2011	2012					
(Turkey)	Metin Diyadin	2012						
(Germany)	Fuat Kılıç	2012		caretaker manager				
(Georgia (country))	Shota Arveladze	2012	2015					
(Netherlands)	Jan Wouters	2015		caretaker manager				
(Turkey)	Önder Özen	2015						
(Turkey)	Rıza Çalımbay	2015	2016					
(Turkey)	Kemal Özdeş	2016	Present					

== Records ==
=== Nationalities ===
Country	Managers	Trophies
(Turkey)	32	3
(Germany)	2	0
(Italy)	1	0
(Georgia (country))	1	0
(Netherlands)	1	0

=== Most games managed ===
Name	Nat.	Games
Renato Vignolini	(Italy)	99
Shota Arveladze	(Georgia (country))	91
Uğur Tütüneker	(Turkey)	77
Eşref Bilgiç	(Turkey)	70
Yılmaz Vural	(Turkey)	54
Cihat Arman	(Turkey)	47
Akif Başaran	(Turkey)	47
