= Suphi Varer =

Turkish Laz football manager

Personal information
- Date of birth: 1936
- Place of birth: Ardeşen, Rize Province, Turkey
- Date of death: 11 March 2015 (aged 78-79)

Managerial career
- Years: Team
- 1972-1973: Göztepe S.K.
- 1973: MKE Kırıkkalespor
- 1973-1974: Kocaelispor
- 1974-1975: Elazığspor
- 1979: İzmirspor
- 1981: Antalyaspor
- 1983: Çaykur Rizespor
- 1986: Kırşehirspor
- 1989: Samsunspor
- 1991-1992: Yeni Sincanspor

Suphi Varer (b. 1936 – March 11, 2015), was a Turkish technical director, educator and security officer of Laz descent.

== Life ==
Varer was born in 1936 in the Ardeşen district of Rize province. He completed his education up to university in Rize. He graduated from the Department of Physical Education Teaching at Gazi University in 1959. He worked as a physical education teacher at Ankara Police College. Afterwards, he worked as Ankara Physical Education regional director, 19 Mayıs Youth and Sports Academy football specialization faculty member, Football Federation course director and General Directorate of Physical Education and Sports chief advisor. In the following years, he worked at the General Directorate of Security. He wrote a book called Football Field Practices. He died on March 11, 2015.

== Coaching career ==
He first served as coach for Göztepe in the 1972-73 season when Sabri Kiraz was not the coach, then MKE Kırıkkalespor in the first week of the 1973-74 season, then Kocaelispor in the 1973-74 season when Suat Mamat was not the coach), Çaykur Rizespor for the first 4 weeks of the 1983-84 season, Samsunspor in the first week of the 1989-90 season and finally Yeni Sincanspor (in the 1991-92 season).
