= Güzelyalı Bridge =

Güzelyalı Bridge Güzelyalı Köprüsü
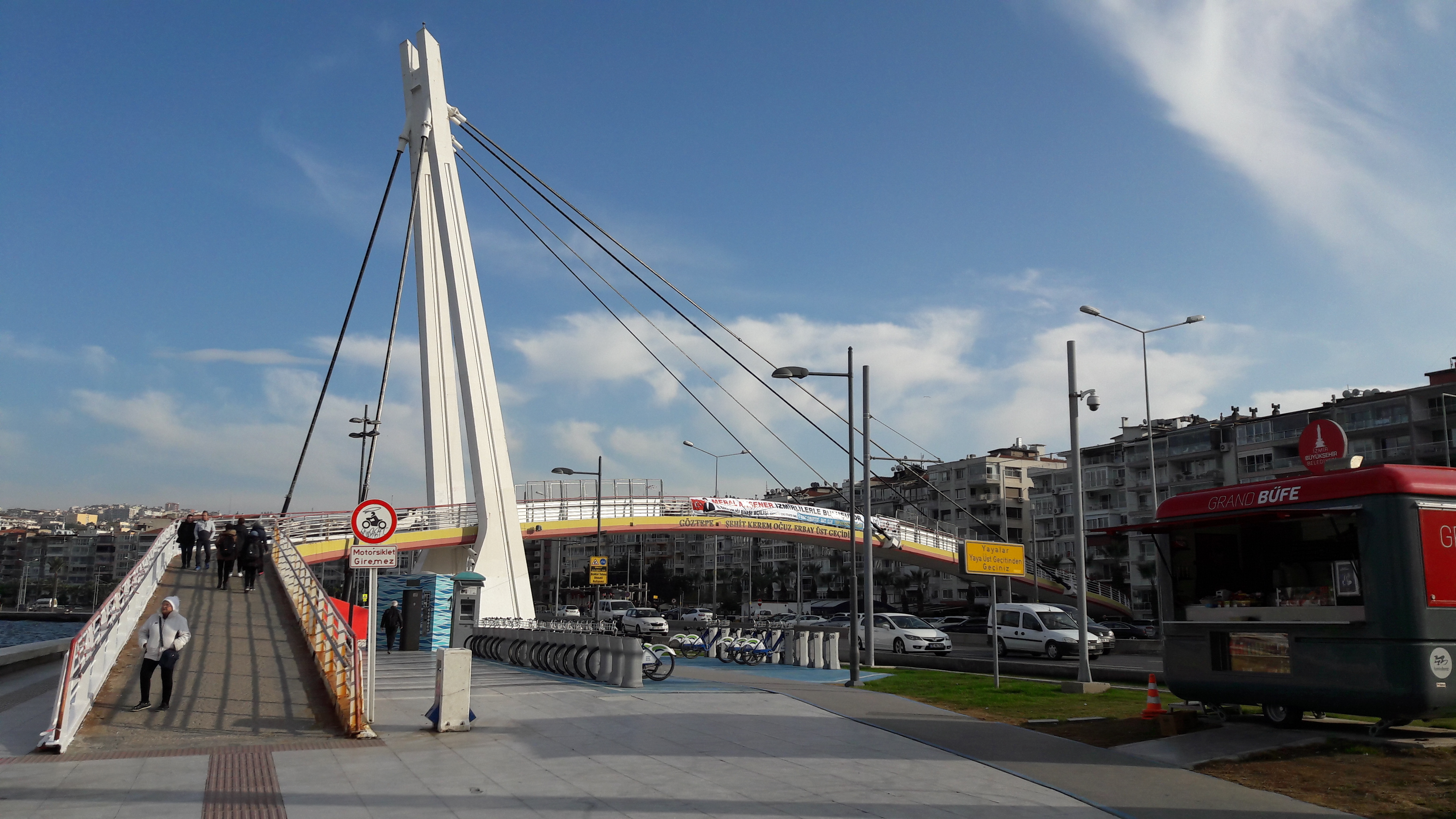
- The overpass seen from the west.
- Coordinates: 38.3989°N 27.0839°E
- Crosses: Mustafa Kemal Coastal Boulevard
- Official name: Göztepe Şehit Kerem Oğuz Erbay Üstgeçidi
- Named for: Pvt. Kerem Oğuz Erbay
- Owner: İzmir Metropolitan Municipality

Characteristics
- Design: Cable-stayed bridge
- Total length: 125 m (410 ft)

History
- Opened: October 1997

Location
- Interactive map of Güzelyalı Bridge

The Göztepe Şehit Kerem Oğuz Erbay Overpass (Turkish: Göztepe Şehit Kerem Oğuz Erbay Üstgeçidi), commonly known as Güzelyalı Bridge (Turkish: Güzelyalı Köprüsü) or just the Bridge Turkish: Köprü), is a 125 m (410 ft) long cable-stayed bridge in İzmir, Turkey. Located in southwest Konak, the bridge is a pedestrian overpass that crosses the Mustafa Kemal Coastal Boulevard. Opened in October 1997, the overpass has become a symbol of Göztepe and its surrounding neighborhoods.

Güzelyalı Bridge was renamed to its current name in 2010, after the death of Private Kerem Oğuz Erbay in a terrorist attack in İskenderun. A large ceremony was held on the bridge for Erbay and Private Serhat Aslan, both İzmir natives, who died in the attack.
