= Ali Artuner =

Turkish footballer (1944–2001)

Personal information
- Full name: Ali Artuner
- Date of birth: 5 September 1944
- Place of birth: İzmir, Turkey
- Date of death: 16 February 2001 (aged 56)
- Place of death: Istanbul, Turkey
- Height: 1.80 m (5 ft 11 in)
- Position: Goalkeeper

Youth career
- –1961: Göztepe

Senior career*
Years	Team	Apps	(Gls)
1961–1975	Göztepe	265	(0)

International career
1963	Turkey U18	4	(0)
1965–1966	Turkey U21	3	(0)
1965–1971	Turkey	24	(0)
- * Club domestic league appearances and goals

Ali Artuner (5 September 1944 – 16 February 2001) was a Turkish footballer who played as a goalkeeper for Göztepe and the Turkey national team in the 1960s, rising to the position of captain on both teams. In his hometown of İzmir, there are many sports complexes and tournaments bearing his name.

He is also the uncle of former Turkish international goalkeeper, Cenk Gönen.

== Playing career ==
=== Club career ===
Born in İzmir, Artuner started out as a halfback. However, he left school at the age of 17, and made his professional debut for Göztepe as goalkeeper that same year (1961). He went on to play 15 consecutive seasons for his team in the Süper Lig. He also helped them win the 1968–69 and 1969–70 editions of the Turkish Cup, as well as the 1970 Turkish Super Cup. He is widely seen as a club legend, and was nicknamed "Moskova panteri" (Moscow Panther).

=== International career ===
Artuner made his debut for the senior national team on 21 July 1965, in a 3–1 win over Pakistan in the 1965 RCD Cup. He represented Turkey at the 1966 FIFA World Cup qualification, playing in one game. He then played in six games at the UEFA Euro 1968 qualifying, as well as two games at the 1970 FIFA World Cup qualification. The last major tournament he played in was the UEFA Euro 1972 qualifying, where he played in five games. He captained his team in four of those games (two against West Germany, and one each against Albania and Poland).
