= Muhammad Saleem (footballer) =

Pakistani footballer

- Saleem with Pakistan during the 1965 RCD Cup

Personal information
- Date of birth: 1942 (age 83–84)
- Place of birth: Nathwala, Sheikhupura, British India
- Position: Forward

Youth career
- 1959–1960: Board of Secondary Education
- 1960–1961: Islamia College Lahore

Senior career*
Years	Team	Apps	(Gls)
- Pakistan Western Railway

International career
1962	Pakistan Youth		
1964–1965	Pakistan	?	(2)
- * Club domestic league appearances and goals

Muhammad Saleem (born 1942) was a Pakistani football player who played as an inside left forward. Saleem captained Pakistan national youth team in the 1962 AFC Youth Championship, and represented the Pakistan national football team between 1964 and 1965.

== Early life ==
Saleem was born in 1942, in the village of Nathwala, in the Sheikhupura district of Punjab province, British India.

== Club career ==
Saleem started playing football in his school in 1956. In 1959, he was selected as captain of the Board of Secondary Education Lahore team, and was sent for training in Dacca. During this time, he enrolled in Islamia College Lahore, and became captain of the football team of the institution in 1960.

In 1961, he was selected by the Lahore Division selection for the National Football Championship. Saleem went on to play for Pakistan Western Railway.

== International career ==
Saleem captained Pakistan national youth team at 1962 AFC Youth Championship held in Bangkok. In 1964, was selected by the senior Pakistan national football team for their tour to China. Saleem scored a goal in their match against the China national team which ended in a 2–0 victory for Pakistan, the second goal of the match was scored by Abdul Ghafoor. The next year, Saleem toured Ceylon with the national team. Later in the 1965 RCD Cup, Saleem scored the consolation goal for Pakistan against Turkey, which ended in a 1–3 defeat.

== Career statistics ==
=== International goals ===
Scores and results list Pakistan's goal tally first, score column indicates score after each Saleem goal.

List of international goals scored by Muhammad Saleem
No.	Date	Venue	Opponent	Score	Result	Competition	Ref.
1	3 October 1964	Workers' Stadium, Beijing, China	China	2–0	2–0	Friendly	
2	21 July 1965	Amjadiyeh Stadium, Tehran, Iran	Turkey	1–3	1–3	1965 RCD Cup	
