= Yılmaz Urul =

Turkish footballer (1942–2025)

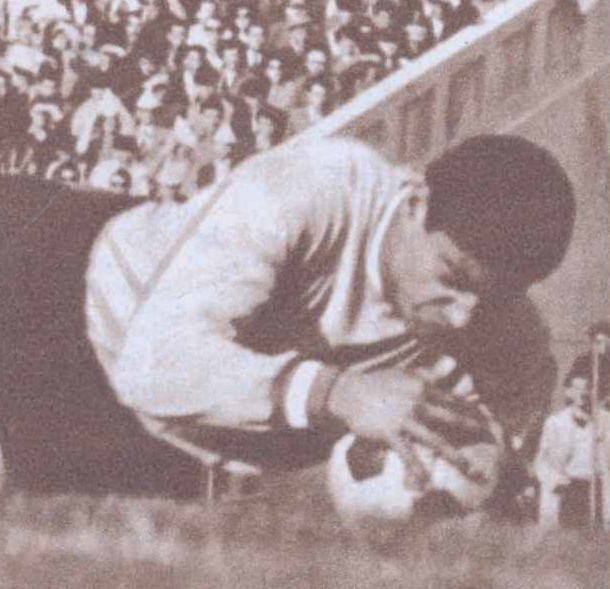

Personal information
- Date of birth: 8 February 1942
- Date of death: 4 January 2025 (aged 82)
- Position: Goalkeeper

Senior career*
Years	Team	Apps	(Gls)
1960–1965	İstanbulspor	79	(0)
1965–1966	Fenerbahçe	5	(0)
1966–1972	İstanbulspor	129	(0)
1972–1973	Mersin İdmanyurdu	23	(0)
Total		236	(0)

International career
1964–1965	Turkey	4	(0)
- * Club domestic league appearances and goals

Yılmaz Urul (8 February 1942 – 4 January 2025) was a Turkish footballer who played as a goalkeeper. He made four appearances for the Turkey national team from 1964 to 1965. Urul died on 4 January 2025, at the age of 82.
