= Hüseyin Hamamcı =

Turkish footballer

Personal information
- Full name: Hüseyin Cahit Hamamcı
- Date of birth: 1 January 1951 (age 75)
- Place of birth: Manisa, Turkey

Managerial career
- Years: Team
- 1986: Diyarbakırspor
- 1988–1991: Karşıyaka (assistant)
- 1991: Karşıyaka
- 1991–1992: Ayvalıkgücü Belediye
- 1992–1994: Çanakkale Dardanelspor
- 1994–1995: Karşıyaka
- 1996: Göztepe
- 1996: Balıkesirspor
- 1996–1997: Erzurumspor
- 1997–1998: İzmirspor
- 1998: Zeytinburnuspor
- 1998–1999: Karşıyaka
- 1999–2000: Mobellaspor
- 2000–2001: Elazığspor
- 2001–2002: Konyaspor
- 2002–2003: Sakaryaspor
- 2003–2004: Kayserispor
- 2004–2005: Karşıyaka
- 2012–2014: Karşıyaka (assistant)
- 2015–2016: Karşıyaka

Hüseyin Cahit Hamamcı (born 1 January 1951) is a Turkish football manager.
