= Serdar Sabuncu =

Turkish footballer and manager

Personal information
- Date of birth: 22 October 1977 (age 49)
- Place of birth: İzmir, Turkey

Team information
- Current team: Sökespor (Sport Director)

Managerial career
- Years: Team
- 2007–2008: Altay (youth)
- 2013–2014: Altınordu (youth)
- 2014–2015: Tirespor 1922
- 2015–2016: Altay
- 2016–2017: 24 Erzincanspor
- 2018–2019: İzmirspor
- 2019–2020: İstanbul Başakşehir (youth)
- 2022: Göztepe (caretaker)
- 2022–: Muş 1984 Muşspor

Serdar Sabuncu (born 22 October 1977) is a Turkish football manager who is the manager of TFF Third League club Muş 1984 Muşspor.

== Managerial career ==
Never a footballer, Sabuncu graduate with a degree in sports in 2001 and began working at the youth academy of Altay in 2007. He had several stints at youth academies and clubs in Turkey. He has been the head of the youth academies of İzmirspor, Altınordu, Göztepe, Bucaspor, and İstanbul Başakşehir. He was the manager of the semi-pro sides Tirespor 1922, Altay, 24 Erzincanspor and İzmirspor. He returned to Göztepe's youth academy on 2 August 2021. On 6 May 2022, Sabuncu was named the interim manager at Göztepe in the Süper Lig after Stjepan Tomas was sacked.
