= Varol Ürkmez =

Turkish footballer (1937–2021)

Personal information
- Date of birth: 17 July 1937
- Place of birth: Adapazarı, Turkey
- Date of death: 28 January 2021 (aged 83)
- Height: 1.75 m (5 ft 9 in)
- Position: Goalkeeper

Senior career*
Years	Team	Apps	(Gls)
1954–1960	Beşiktaş		
1960–1968	Altay Izmir		
1968–1970	Galatasaray		
1970–1971	Manisaspor		
1971–1972	Gençlerbirliği		
1972–1973	Manisaspor		

International career
1958–1965	Turkey	4	(0)
- * Club domestic league appearances and goals

Varol Ürkmez (17 July 1937 – 28 January 2021) was a Turkish footballer who played as a goalkeeper. He made four appearances for the Turkey from 1958 to 1965.
