= Akif Başaran =

Turkish footballer

Personal information
- Full name: Mehmet Akif Başaran
- Date of birth: 15 February 1956 (age 70)
- Place of birth: İzmir, Turkey
- Position: Midfielder

Senior career*
Years	Team	Apps	(Gls)
1974–1979	Altay Izmir		
1979–1981	Beşiktaş		
1981–1982	Bursaspor		
1982–1983	Altay Izmir		

Managerial career
- 1987–1988: Altay Izmir (assistant)
- 1988: Altay Izmir
- 1988–1989: Altay Izmir (assistant)
- 1989: Altay Izmir
- 1989–1990: Altay Izmir (assistant)
- 1990–1991: Petrolofisi
- 1991–1992: İzmirspor
- 1992–1993: Aliağa Genclik
- 1993–1994: Petrolofisi (youth director)
- 1994: Sakaryaspor
- 1994: Karabükspor
- 1995–1996: Malatyaspor
- 1998: Dardanelspor (assistant)
- 1998–1999: Eskişehirspor
- 2000: Adıyamanspor
- 2001: Karşıyaka
- 2002: Zeytinburnuspor
- 2005–2007: Kasımpaşa
- 2007: Giresunspor
- 2009: Göztepe
- 2010: Sarıyer
- 2013–2014: Akçaabat Sebatspor
- 2014–2015: Aydınspor
- 2016–2017: Fethiyespor
- 2017–2018: Aydınspor
- * Club domestic league appearances and goals

Mehmet Akif Başaran (born 15 February 1956) is a Turkish former football player and manager who played as a midfielder.
