= Oscar Hold =

English footballer and manager

Personal information
- Date of birth: 19 October 1918
- Place of birth: Carlton, England
- Date of death: 11 October 2005 (aged 86)
- Place of death: Sunderland, England
- Position: Striker

Senior career*
Years	Team	Apps	(Gls)
1937–1939	Barnsley		
1946–1947	Aldershot	14	(3)
1946–1949	Norwich City	44	(18)
1948–1949	Notts County	19	(9)
1949–1950	Chelmsford City		
1949–1951	Everton	22	(5)
1951–1953	Queens Park Rangers	5	(1)

Managerial career
- 1961–1962: Cambridge City
- 1962–1964: Doncaster Rovers
- 1964–1965: Fenerbahçe
- 1965–1967: Ankara Demirspor
- 1967–1971: Al-Ahli (Jeddah)
- 1973–1974: Apollon Limassol
- 1975–1976: Göztepe
- 1983–1984: Apollon Limassol
- * Club domestic league appearances and goals

Oscar Hold (19 October 1918 – 11 October 2005) was an English football player and manager. Hold played for Everton and Norwich City He became manager of Doncaster Rovers in 1962, taking over from Danny Malloy, and also managed Turkish champion Fenerbahçe SK on (1964–65), with whom he won the Turkish League title and Atatürk Cup titles. Then he trained the Saudi Al-Ahli club in Jeddah and won four titles, including the league title three times with two different names (General League Shield, King's Cup League) in 1968, 1970 and 1971 and the Saudi Crown Prince Cup in 1970. In 1983–84, he managed Apollon Limassol.

== Honours ==
=== Manager ===
Fenerbahçe

- 1. Lig: 1964–65
