= Mostafa Arab =

Iranian footballer (born 1941)

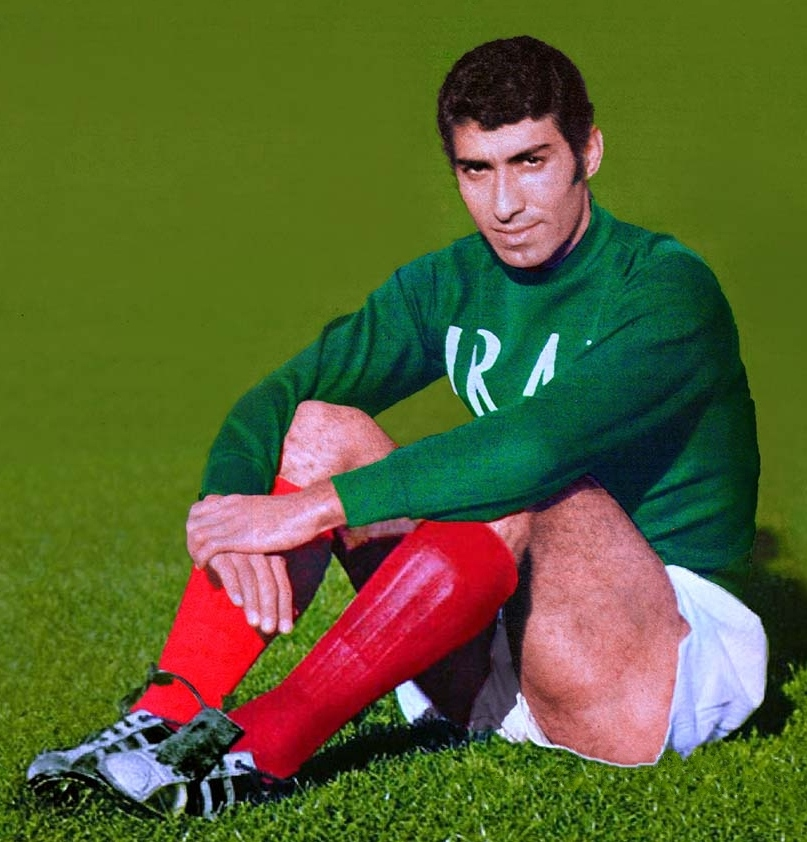
- Mostafa Arab in 1972

Personal information
- Full name: Mostafa Arab
- Date of birth: August 13, 1941 (age 85)
- Place of birth: Tehran, Iran
- Height: 1.78 m (5 ft 10 in)
- Position: Defender

Senior career*
Years	Team	Apps	(Gls)
1950–1954	Daraei F.C.		
1954–1958	Shahpar		
1958–1973	Oghab FC		

International career
1959–1972	Iran	48	(2)
- * Club domestic league appearances and goals

Mostafa Arab (born August 13, 1941) is a retired Iranian association football defender. After Hossein Kaebi, Arab is the second youngest Iran national football team player of all time, debuting at the age of 16. He played three games at the 1964 Summer Olympics in Tokyo, won a silver medal at the 1966 Asian Games, and held the 1968 and 1972 AFC Asian Cups.

== Education ==
Arab is married and has five children. He holds six different master's degrees from colleges and universities in Iran and U.S. He also has a Ph.D. in philosophy, leadership and human behavior. Arab teaches at a private academy and runs a publication company in Southern California ("Pajouhesh" monthly and "Arya" newsletter).

== Achievements ==
- Selected All Star team in the Continental of Asia twice (1966–1968)
- Athlete of the Year 3 times in [[Iran]]
- Bronze medalist at the World Armed Forces Championship in 1968, Athens, Greece
- Silver medalist of the Asian games in 1966, Bangkok, Thailand
- Gold medalist of the Asian Nations Cup 1972, Bangkok, Thailand
- Gold medalist of the Asian Nations Cup 1968, Tehran, Iran
- Captain/Player of Iranian national team in pre Olympic Games in 1972, Germany
- Captain/Player of Iranian national team in Olympic Games in 1964, Tokyo, Japan
- Captain/Player in the Iranian Imperial Air Force team for 18 years
- Captain/Player and Iranian Armed Forces for 16 years
