= Tahir Karapınar =

Turkish footballer

Personal information
- Date of birth: 20 April 1967 (age 59)
- Place of birth: İzmir, Turkey
- Height: 1.80 m (5 ft 11 in)
- Position: Midfielder

Senior career*
Years	Team	Apps	(Gls)
1988–1989	Manisaspor		
1989–1991	Göztepe		
1991–2003	Altay		

Managerial career
- 2009: Altay
- 2011–2012: Gaziantepspor (assistant)
- 2013–2014: Manisaspor (assistant)
- 2017–2018: Konyaspor (assistant)
- 2020: Fenerbahçe (caretaker)
- 2020–2023: Fenerbahçe (youth)
- * Club domestic league appearances and goals

Tahir Karapınar (born 20 April 1967) is a Turkish football coach and former player who most recently managed Fenerbahçe youth team. He played as a midfielder.

He currently serves as development coach of Fenerbahçe.
