= Cem Pamiroğlu =

Turkish footballer

Şenol Çorlu
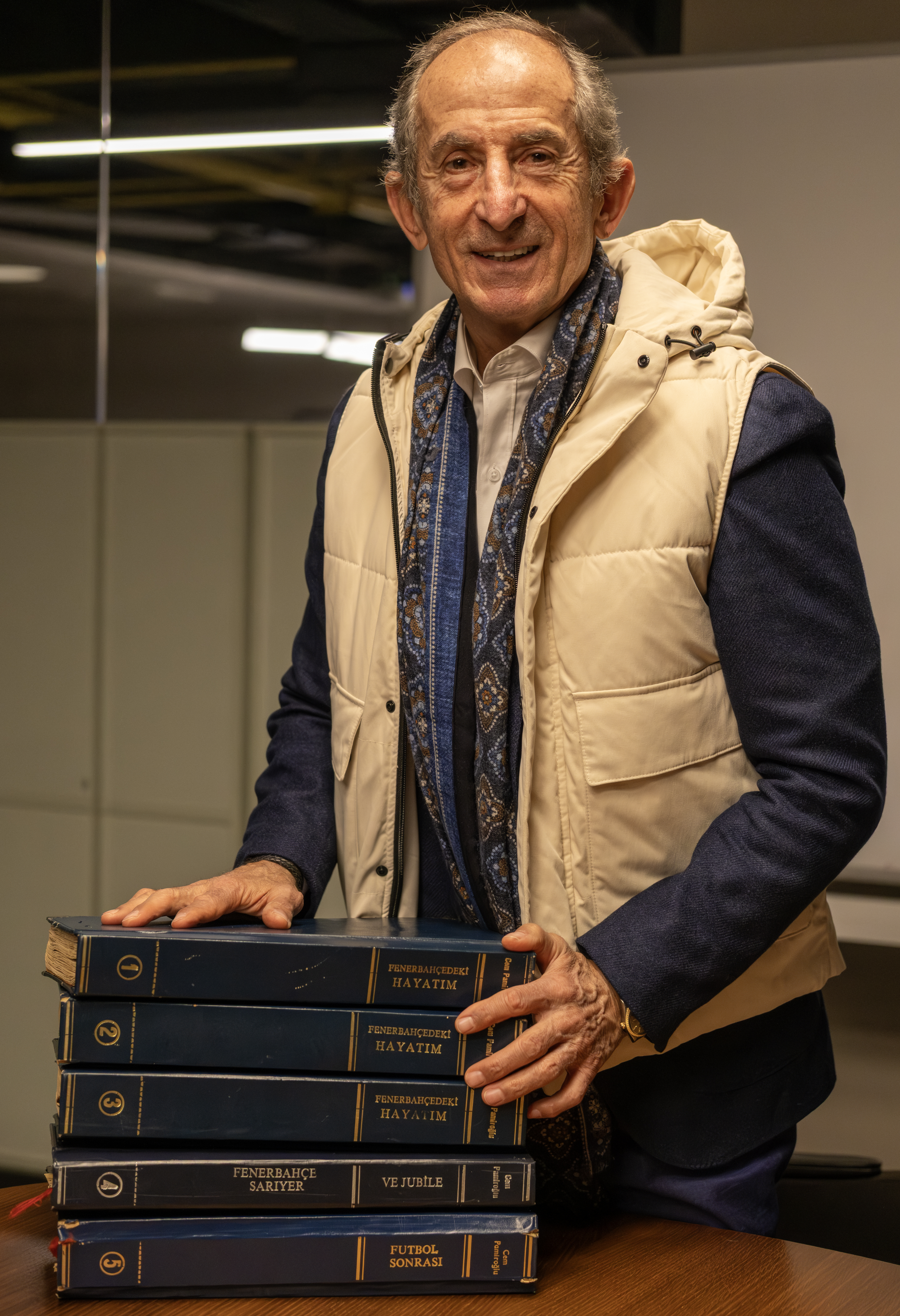
- Pamiroğlu in 2026

Personal information
- Date of birth: 17 September 1957 (age 69)
- Place of birth: Istanbul, Turkey
- Positions: Left-back; centre-back

Youth career
- 1969–1975: Fenerbahçe

Senior career*
| Years | Team | Apps | (Gls) |
| 1975–1987 | Fenerbahçe | 279 | (5) |
| 1987–1990 | Sarıyer | 86 | (0) |
| Total | | 365 | (5) |

International career
| 1977–1986 | Turkey | 23 | (0) |

Managerial career
- 1992–1993: Fenerbahçe (youth)
- 1996: Orduspor
- 1998–1999: Ağrıspor
- 1999–2000: Çaykur Rizespor
- 2004: Göztepe
- 2008: Çanakkale Dardanelspor
- * Club domestic league appearances and goals

Cem Pamiroğlu (born 17 September 1957) is a Turkish former footballer who played as a left-back, most notably for Fenerbahçe.

== Biography ==
Pamiroğlu was born on 17 September 1957 in Istanbul. He started his career in Fenerbahçe PAF then up to Fenerbahçe in 1975. He won three Turkish League titles and two Turkish Cup with Fenerbahçe. He also played 23 times for Turkey, six times for Turkey U21 and 14 times for Turkey U18.

He capped 508 times for Fenerbahçe and been fourth most capped (after Müjdat Yetkiner, Lefter Küçükandonyadis and Şeref Has). He was initially loaned to Sarıyer in 1986 and finally transferred to Sarıyer in 1987 and played for her two seasons before his retirement in 1989.

Now he is manager of Turkey U18 and Turkey U19 national football teams. He also managed Çaykur Rizespor, Şekerspor and Göztepe.
