= Ümit Turmuş =

Turkish football coach (born 1960)

Ümit Turmuş (born 21 June 1960, Turkey) is a Turkish football coach.

== Career ==
Turmuş started his coaching career from 1984 to 1985 at Antalyaspor. Two years later he joined up with English club Arsenal. At Arsenal he at first took up the role as a coach of the club's Academy. During the following season he went on to coach the club's senior side. Turmuş eventually returned to Turkey where he coached at sides Malatyaspor and Balikesirspor. At Balikesirspor he picked up a winners medal as they lifted the 1991–92 3rd division title. In 2001 he again left Turkey to coach at Cameroon's Racing FC Bafoussam. Turmuş was very popular in Cameroon and he was even nicknamed the 'Lion of Bafoussam'. He once stated an aim to coach the Cameroon national football team which is a move that's so far been unfruitful. Turmuş later returned to Turkey to work as a coach at clubs Altai, Elazığspor, Yozgatspor and Altay.
