= Önder Özen =

Turkish soccer coach and former player (born 1969)

Personal information
- Full name: Zeki Önder Özen
- Date of birth: 17 October 1969 (age 57)
- Place of birth: Eskişehir, Turkey
- Height: 1.78 m (5 ft 10 in)

Managerial career
- Years: Team
- 2001–2002: Eskispor (Trainer)
- 2003–2005: Fenerbahçe A2
- 2005–2009: Fenerbahçe (Assistant coach)
- 2009–2010: Hacettepe
- 2010–2011: Polatlı Bugsaşspor
- 2013–2014: Beşiktaş (Director of Football)
- 2015: Kasımpaşa
- 2016: Göztepe

Zeki Önder Özen (born 17 October 1969 in Eskişehir) is a Turkish football coach and former player. He managed Bugsaş Spor and had been an assistant coach and match analyst of Fenerbahçe.

He qualified for a coaching license in 1997. He has been working for Fenerbahçe and Fenerbahçe Youth Academy from January 2002 to 2008. He also managed Hacettepe Spor Kulübü in 2009–10 season. In 2012, he started to appear on Ntvspor as a commentator.

President of Beşiktaş JK, Fikret Orman made a press conference on 22 May 2013, to announce that Özen was the new Director of football of the club.

== Management mentality ==
On 22 March 2013, Özen declared his football mentality during his presentation for Beşiktaş. For him a perfect football team should comprise 24 players, divided to three groups of eight players. According to him, first group of players must be well-experienced, international and winner. Second group of players must be local heroes, fighters and good team-workers. The last group should be formed as young, determined and disciplined players.

== Managerial statistics ==
As of 4 May 2015

Team	From	To	Record				
Team	From	To	G	W	D	L	Win %
Hacettepe	2009	2010	18	4	2	12	22.22
Polatlı Bugsaşspor	2010	2011	37	20	10	7	54.05
Kasımpaşa	2015	May 2015	8	2	2	4	25.00
Göztepe	2016	April 2016	5	1	2	2	20.00
Total			58	26	12	20	44.83
