= Sabri Kiraz =

Turkish football manager

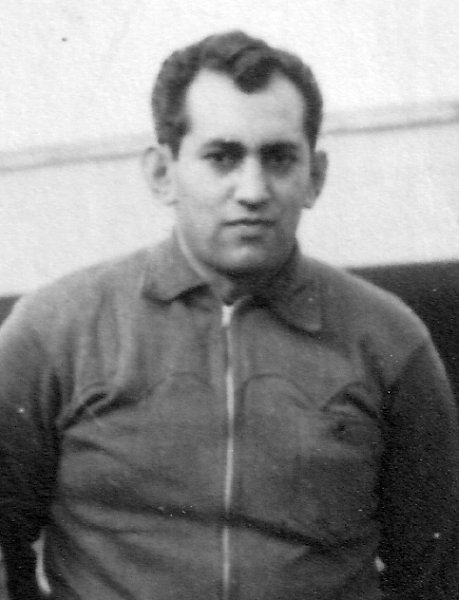

Personal information
- Date of birth: 1918
- Date of death: 12 January 1985 (aged 66–67)

Managerial career
- Years: Team
- 1966–1968: Bursaspor
- 1971–1972: Fenerbahçe
- 1972–1973: Göztepe
- 1974: Ankaragücü
- 1976: Ankaragücü
- 1978–1980: Turkey

Sabri Kiraz (1918 – 12 January 1985) was a Turkish football manager. He managed the Turkish national team.
