= Onursal Uraz =

Turkish footballer

Personal information
- Date of birth: 26 March 1944
- Date of death: 24 July 2021 (aged 77)

International career
Years	Team	Apps	(Gls)
1965–1966	Turkey	4	(0)

Onursal Uraz (26 March 1944 – 24 July 2021) was a Turkish footballer. He played in four matches for the Turkey national football team from 1965 to 1966.
