= Nevzat Güzelırmak =

Turkish footballer (1942–2020)

Personal information
- Date of birth: 1 January 1942
- Place of birth: İzmir, Turkey
- Date of death: 12 October 2020 (aged 78)
- Height: 1.76 m (5 ft 9 in)
- Position: Defender

Senior career*
Years	Team	Apps	(Gls)
1960–1975	Göztepe		

International career
1962–1968	Turkey	18	(1)

Managerial career
- 1977–1980: Turkey U21
- 1978–1981: Turkey (assistant)
- 1979–1980: Antalyaspor
- 1980: Göztepe
- 1981–1983: Boluspor
- 1983–1986: Denizlispor
- 1985–1986: Afyonspor
- 1986–1987: Konyaspor
- 1987–1988: Bursaspor
- 1988–1989: Altay
- 1989–1990: Karşıyaka
- 1991: Göztepe
- 1991–1992: Kayseri Erciyesspor
- 1992–1993: Sarıyer
- 1993: Aydınspor
- 1993–1994: Bursaspor
- 1994–1995: Kayseri Erciyesspor
- 1996: Adana Demirspor
- 1997: Kuşadasıspor
- * Club domestic league appearances and goals

Nevzat Güzelırmak (1 January 1942 – 12 October 2020) was a Turkish football defender and later manager. He was capped 18 times for Turkey.
