= TOKİ =

Turkey's government-backed housing agency

Mass Housing Development Administration
- Toplu Konut İdaresi
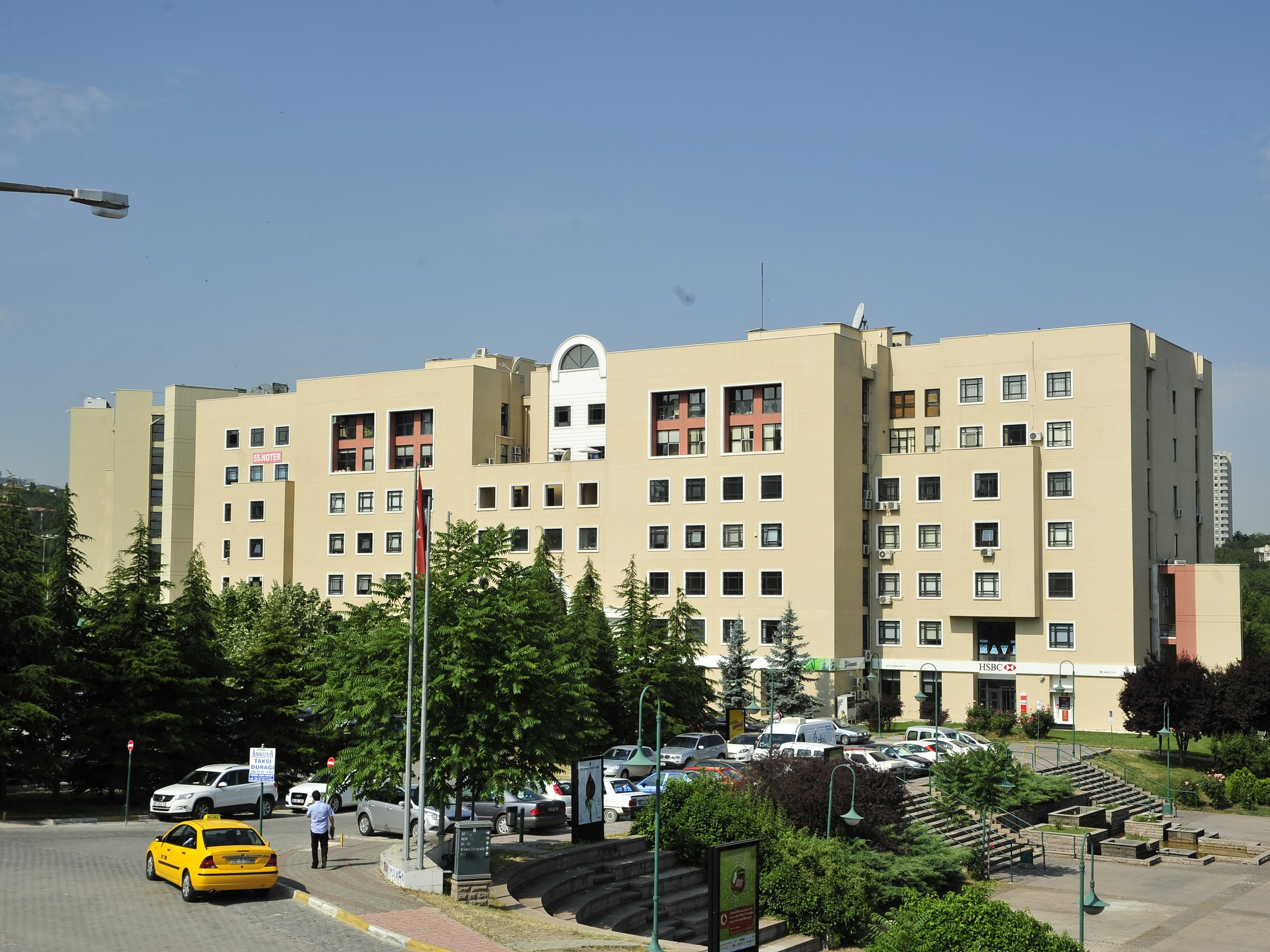
- Bilkent Plaza in Ankara, the Headquarters of TOKİ.

Department overview
- Formed: 1984
- Jurisdiction: Turkey
- Headquarters: Ankara
- Department executive: Levent Sungur
- Parent Ministry: Ministry of Environment and Urban Planning (Turkey)
- Website: www.toki.gov.tr

TOKİ (Turkish: Toplu Konut İdaresi Başkanlığı, lit. 'Mass Housing Development Administration') is Turkey's government-backed housing agency.

Founded in 1984, TOKİ carries out projects and activities primarily throughout Turkey in line with the government building and mass housing priorities. In 2004 the Government enabled the Districts with a new municipality law to cooperate with TOKİ to develop unprivileged areas.

== Domestic projects ==
Projects include:

- Regeneration and transformation of informal areas and settlements (gecekondu)
- Social housing projects toward the middle- and low-income categories
- Establishing model settlement units in our medium-scale provinces and districts
- Developing historic fabric and local architecture
- Educational and social facilities
- Reconstruction activities and disaster relief

TOKİ aims to complete 1 million housing units by the end of 2023 and plans to complete 64,000 units in 2017, worth $2.5 billion.

As of June 2017, TOKİ has delivered;

- Over 590,000 housing units, 86% of which are classified as social housing which targets lower income groups.
- 563 schools
- Over 10,000 social facilities including sport halls, cultural centers, libraries, mosques, commercial centers and hospitals.

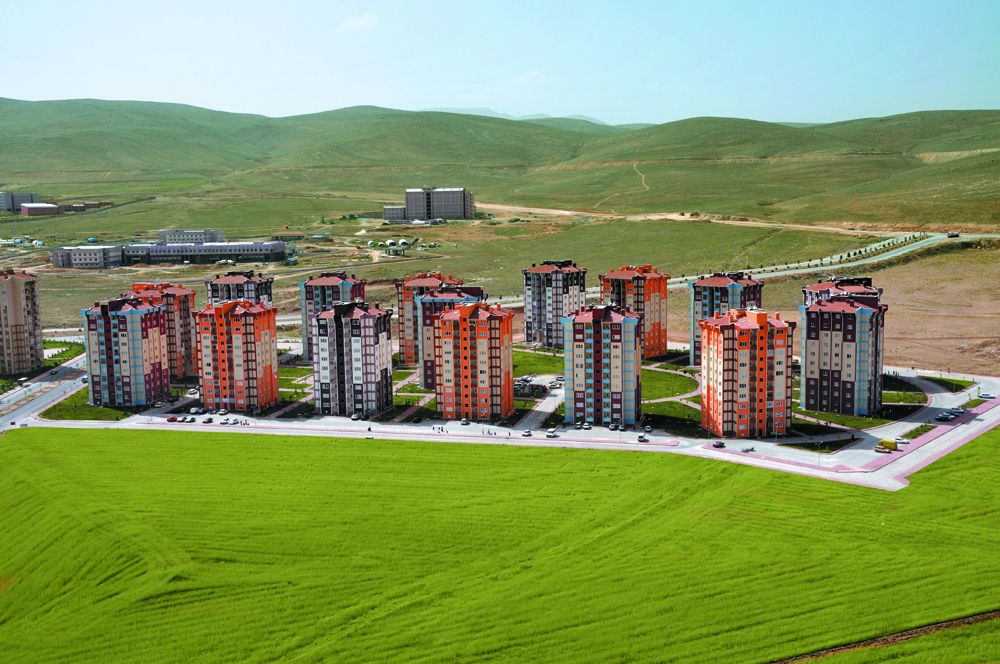
A TOKI development outside of Konya

== International projects ==
TOKİ carries out mainly disaster relief and reconstruction activities worldwide, in cooperation with other international aid agencies.

Projects completed include;

- 1050 houses in Aceh, Indonesia
- 500 houses in Sri Lanka
- 4620 houses and 37 social facilities in Pakistan
- 200-bed hospital and 40-class nurse college in Somalia

== Awards ==
- HABITAT Scroll of HONOR in 1994 for the Erzincan Earthquake Reconstruction Project.
- International Award for Entrepreneurship in Real Estate and Housing Development in 2008, Expo Italia Real Estate
- HABITAT Best Practice Award in 2008 for the Erzincan Çarşı Quarter Urban Renewal-Slum Transformation Project
