= Göztepe S.K. =

Turkish sports club

Göztepe
- Full name: Göztepe Spor Kulübü
- Nickname: Göz Göz
- Founded: 14 June 1925; 101 years ago (as Göztepe Gençlik Kulübü)
- Ground: Gürsel Aksel Stadium
- Capacity: 23376
- Coordinates: 38°23′49″N 27°04′33″E
- Owner: Sport Republic
- Chairman: Rasmus Ankersen
- Head coach: Stanimir Stoilov
- League: Süper Lig
- 2025–26: Süper Lig, 6th of 18
- Website: goztepe.org.tr
Home colours	Away colours	Third colours

Göztepe Spor Kulübü (Turkish pronunciation: [ɟœztepe spoɾ kulyby], Göztepe Sports Club), commonly referred to as Göztepe, is a Turkish multi-sport club based in the Göztepe and Güzelyalı neighborhoods of İzmir. Founded on 14 June 1925 as Göztepe Gençlik Kulübü (Göztepe Youth Club), it is one of the oldest sports institutions in Turkey with a rich history spanning over a century.

Originally formed as a neighborhood club, Göztepe became nationally prominent in the mid-20th century, particularly after becoming Turkish champions in 1950. In 1969, the club made history by becoming the first Turkish team to reach the semi-finals of a European competition, achieving this milestone in the Inter-Cities Fairs Cup (a predecessor to the UEFA Europa League).

Besides football, the club operates as a joint-stock company (AŞ) and includes multiple branches in fencing, triathlon, handball, volleyball, basketball, gymnastics, archery, billiards, sailing, swimming, and windsurfing, making it one of the most comprehensive sports institutions in the country.

Despite facing relegation and financial hardship between 2002 and 2008, Göztepe maintained one of the most loyal fan bases in Turkey. Even during their time in the Turkish Regional Amateur League, the club continued to attract higher average attendances than many top-flight clubs. Their resilience and support culminated in a return to the Süper Lig, where they continue to compete under the ownership of Sport Republic and the leadership of Rasmus Ankersen.

As of the 2024–25 season, Göztepe competes in the Süper Lig, and currently ranks 8th out of 19 teams in the league table. In the "all-time table" of Turkish football, Göztepe holds the 13th place overall based on historic performance and points.

== History ==
Göztepe was founded on 14 June 1925 in the Göztepe, Güzelyalı quarter of Konak, İzmir, following a split from Altay; at the inaugural meeting the club adopted red and yellow as its colours and set a striped shirt as the first football kit.

Contemporary accounts describe these short-lived İzmir "mergers" as a policy pushed by the provincial governor to field stronger representatives in the new national competition (Milli Küme): alongside Doğanspor (Göztepe–İzmirspor–Egespor), Altay–Altınordu–Yüce combined as Üçok and Karşıyaka–Bornova as Yamanlar. Doğanspor competed in the İzmir League and the Milli Küme in 1937–39 (contemporary match reports list the club under that name), while Ateşspor formed by İzmirspor members opposed to the merger played the same competitions before İzmirspor reverted to its historic name. According to the club's official history, Doğanspor won the local league in 1938–39 and, following a members' congress on 12 September 1940, the football branch formally restored the Göztepe name.

Göztepe's early national honours came in the pre-league era: they won the Turkish Football Championship in 1950 (Final Group hosted in İzmir) and finished runners-up in 1942. The club's "golden era" under coach Adnan Süvari (mid-1960s to 1971) produced back-to-back Turkish Cup wins in 1968–69 and 1969–70 and the Turkish Super Cup in 1970. In Europe, Süvari's Göztepe became the first Turkish side to reach a European semi-final: the 1968–69 Inter-Cities Fairs Cup, advancing past Marseille, Argeș Pitești and OFK Beograd before losing to Újpest in the last four. The following season they reached the 1969–70 European Cup Winners' Cup quarter-finals (eliminating Union Luxembourg and Cardiff City) and went out to Roma (0–2, 0–0).

Starting with 2002–03 season which brought relegation from Süper Lig, Göztepe struggled with financial problems. Due to the inability to reduce their outstanding debt, the football club was banned from signing new players, which resulted in a free-fall with the team being relegated four times in the next five seasons. On 21 April 2007 they lost their last home game 2–0 against Aliağa Belediyespor in TFF Third League and were relegated to the Regional Amateur League.

On 20 August 2007, the club was sold in an auction to the Istanbul-based business conglomerate Altınbaş Holdings. The owner, businessman İmam Altınbaş, vowed to take Göztepe back to the Süper Lig, making them one of the top five clubs in Turkish football. The owners of the club were met by the local fan base with initial suspicion. Altınbaş Holdings sold the club to Mehmet Sepil in June 2014, for a sum rumored to be around $9 million.

The team competed in the Regional Amateur League for the 2007–08 season but were eliminated by Ayazağaspor after a 6–5 penalty kick shootout in Eskişehir. Following relegation to the Regional Amateur League, Göztepe re-entered the professional pyramid at the start of 2008–09 by acquiring Aliağa Belediyespor's competition/naming rights. On 18 June 2008 the Turkish Football Federation approved Aliağa Belediyespor's request to change its name, colours and crest to Göztepe, allowing the club to take Aliağa's place in the TFF Third League; contemporary reports and officials described this as a transfer of competition rights rather than a full merger.

Göztepe returned to the professional leagues in 2008–09 and won the TFF Third League overall title, defeating Tepecik Belediyespor 2–0 to seal promotion to the TFF Second League. After finishing eighth in the Second League in 2009–10, the club won the White Group in 2010–11 and were promoted to the TFF First League.

Göztepe again won promotion from the Second League in 2014–15, clinching the Red Group and receiving the championship trophy before the final matchday. On 4 June 2017, they returned to the Süper Lig for the first time since 2002–03 by defeating Eskişehirspor on penalties in the First League play-off final in Antalya (1–1 a.e.t., 4–3 pens). The club were relegated from the Süper Lig at the end of the 2021–22 season, along with Altay and Yeni Malatyaspor.

In August 2022 London-based investment firm Sport Republic purchased a 70% controlling stake and named co-founder Rasmus Ankersen as club chairman. In the first full season under the new ownership (2022–23), the team finished 7th in the TFF First League with 60 points.

On 21 November 2023, Bulgarian coach Stanimir Stoilov was appointed head coach on a 2.5-year deal. Under Stoilov, Göztepe secured automatic promotion in 2023–24 by beating Gençlerbirliği 2–0 at Gürsel Aksel Stadium on 28 April 2024, returning to the Süper Lig after two seasons. The club subsequently extended Stoilov's contract through the end of the 2026–27 season.

== Rivalries ==
Göztepe's principal rivalry is with fellow İzmir side Karşıyaka, a derby commonly known as the İzmir derby. The clubs are rooted on opposite shores of the gulf Göztepe in the Göztepe quarter of Konak, and Karşıyaka in the Karşıyaka district which underpins the local intensity of the fixture.

The best-known meeting was on 16 May 1981 at İzmir Atatürk Stadium in the Turkish second tier the match ended Karşıyaka 0–0 Göztepe. Contemporary lists record an official paid attendance of 67,696, while many reports describe a crowd of around 80,000 and frequently cite it as a Guinness-recognised record for a second-division game and The Guardian published an article named "The biggest non-top-flight attendance ever" including this match. The derby has been marked by fervent atmospheres and, at times, security concerns reported in the Turkish press.

Beyond Karşıyaka, Göztepe also play fiercely contested İzmir derbies with Altay, Altınordu, Bucaspor and İzmirspor. The Altay rivalry is rooted in the club's origin Göztepe's 1925 foundation followed disputes within Altay and the departure of several Altay players to the new club. The fixture has produced flashpoints, notably on 27 November 2022 when the Altay–Göztepe match in İzmir was abandoned after a pitch invader attacked Altay goalkeeper Ozan Evrim Özenç with a corner flag the TFF condemned the incident and media detailed subsequent arrests and how fireworks reached the stands. Altınordu are another major city rival, regularly facing Göztepe in league competition. The same applies to Bucaspor and its successor Bucaspor 1928, with whom Göztepe have had numerous derby clashes across league and cup. İzmirspor, although now competing in lower divisions, were historically part of the city's core football rivalry structure, especially during the early and mid-20th century.

== Stadium ==
For much of the club's history, Göztepe played at the old Alsancak Stadium in Konak; the team were still hosting fixtures there in 2010, before shifting home games to İzmir Atatürk Stadium from 2011 to 2016.

From October 2016, Göztepe temporarily played home matches at the Bornova Aziz Kocaoğlu Stadium in İzmir while their new venue was built. The club's new ground, the Gürsel Aksel Stadium, opened on 26 January 2020 with a Süper Lig match against Beşiktaş. The Gürsel Aksel complex was developed by TOKİ and Rönesans and includes club-oriented amenities such as a Göztepe museum and retail/food areas. A distinctive 650-metre walking track on the roof is open to the public on non-match days. The stadium has also hosted major domestic finals, including the 2021 Turkish Cup final and the 2023 Turkish Cup final.

=== Stadium history ===
#	Stadium	Years	Capacity	Ref
1	Alsancak Stadium	1925–2011	15358	
2	İzmir Atatürk Stadium	2011–2016	51337	
3	Bornova Stadium	2016–2020	12500	
4	Gürsel Aksel Stadium	2020–	19713	

== Colors and crest ==
Göztepe's traditional colours are red and yellow, adopted at the club's foundation in 1925; the inaugural general meeting also set a striped shirt as the first kit design.

The current crest is a red-and-yellow shield surmounted by a scroll bearing "Göztepe" and the foundation year "1925". Inside the shield, a vintage laced football sits alongside a distinctive chequered panel; according to the club's corporate guidelines, the chequers represent Göztepe's amateur sports branches. The same guide specifies red and yellow as the primary identity colours, with black, grey and white as approved auxiliary tones for applications.

Göztepe kits have generally combined the club colours in striped, halved, quartered or chequered layouts; recent home shirts have prominently used a chequered motif that echoes the crest. The club has worn Umbro kits since 2021, following earlier deals with Puma (2019–2021), Lotto (2016–2019) and Kappa (2014–2016). The club has also released occasional retro-themed shirts celebrating anniversaries and historic designs.

=== Kit manufacturers and shirt sponsors ===
Period	Kit manufacturer	Shirt sponsor	Ref
1923–92	none	—	
1992–95	adidas	—	
1996–98	Puma	—	
1998–99	adidas	JETPA	
1999–00	Umbro	JETPA	
2000–01	Le Coq Sportif	İzmir Büyükşehir	
2001–02	Fila	—	
2004–05	Umbro	Alpet	
2005–06	Lotto	Alpet	
2006–07	Lotto	Alpet	
2007–08	Umbro	Samgaz	
2008–10	Gozza	—	
2010–12	In-house	—	
2012–13	Puma	SporToto	
2014–16	Kappa	Folkart	
2016–19	Lotto	Mahall Bomonti	
2019–21	Puma	Türkerler	
2021–22	Umbro	Folkart	
2022–23	Umbro	—	
2023–24	Umbro	Lemar Lojistik	
2024–	Umbro	Yunusoğlu	

== Ownership and finances ==
Göztepe are operated by the joint-stock company Göztepe Sportif Yatırımlar A.Ş. (registered at the Gürsel Aksel Stadium address in Konak, İzmir). After the club's financial collapse in the mid-2000s, the Turkish Savings Deposit Insurance Fund (TMSF) auctioned the team in August 2007; Altınbaş Holding won the tender and ran the club through 2014. In June 2014 Altınbaş sold all shares to businessman Mehmet Sepil.

On 19 August 2022, London-based sports investment firm Sport Republic reached a deal to acquire a 70% controlling stake in Göztepe, with the existing shareholders (including Sepil) retaining 30%. The transaction marked the first foreign majority investment in a Turkish professional club; Sport Republic appointed co-founder Rasmus Ankersen as club president/chairman. Sport Republic also holds a controlling stake in Southampton, indicating a multi-club ownership model.

In addition to matchday and commercial income, the club has experimented with digital fan engagement revenues. In 2021 Göztepe launched the GOZ fan token in partnership with Chiliz/Socios.com, later migrated to the Chiliz Chain with other tokens in 2023.

== Honours ==
=== League ===
- Turkish Football Championship
  - Champions: 1950
  - Runners-up: 1942
- TFF First League
  - Winners: 1977–78, 1980–81, 1998–99, 2000–01
  - Runners-up: 1989–90, 1990–91, 2023–24
- TFF Second League
  - Winners: 2010–11, 2014–15
  - Runners-up: 2013–14
- TFF Third League
  - Winners: 2008–09

=== Cups ===
- Turkish Cup
  - Winners: 1968–69, 1969–70
  - Runners-up: 1966–67
- Turkish Super Cup
  - Winners: 1970
  - Runners-up: 1969
- Prime Minister's Cup
  - Runners-up: 1950

=== Europe ===
- Inter-Cities Fairs Cup
  - Semi-finalist: 1968–69
- UEFA Cup Winners' Cup
  - Quarter-finalist: 1969–70

=== Other achievements ===
- Turkish Federation Cup
  - Winners: 1962–63
- İzmir Football League
  - Winners (5): 1941–42, 1942–43, 1943–44, 1949–50, 1952–53

== Statistics ==
=== Results of League and Cup Competitions by Season ===
Season	League table										Turkish Cup	UEFA	Top scorer	
Season	League	Pos	P	W	D	L	GF	GA	GD	Pts	Turkish Cup	UEFA	Player	Goals
1959	Süper Lig	4th	14	5	5	4	23	21	2	20	–	N/A	Gürsel Aksel	5
1959–60	Süper Lig	14th	38	9	14	15	35	41	−6	41	–	N/A	Gürsel Aksel	9
1960–61	Süper Lig	13th	38	12	10	16	40	53	−13	46	–	N/A	Gürsel Aksel	11
1961–62	Süper Lig	7th	38	12	17	9	46	42	4	53	–	N/A	Gürsel Aksel	19
1962–63	Süper Lig	13th	20	8	3	9	27	25	2	27	QF	N/A	Fevzi Zemzem	12
1963–64	Süper Lig	5th	34	14	12	8	39	31	8	54	R3	N/A	Fevzi Zemzem	17
1964–65	Süper Lig	4th	30	11	9	10	31	33	−2	42	R3	R1	Fevzi Zemzem	12
1965–66	Süper Lig	5th	30	12	8	10	33	27	6	44	R3	R1	Fevzi Zemzem	15
1966–67	Süper Lig	4th	32	14	10	8	47	31	16	52	RU	R1	Fevzi Zemzem	23
1967–68	Süper Lig	4th	32	13	9	10	46	34	12	48	R2	R3	Fevzi Zemzem	21
1968–69	Süper Lig	7th	30	9	12	9	30	26	4	39	W	SF	Fevzi Zemzem	25
1969–70	Süper Lig	5th	30	12	11	7	33	29	4	47	W	QF	Fevzi Zemzem	20
1970–71	Süper Lig	3rd	30	14	9	7	38	21	17	51	SF	R2	Ali Çağlar	12
1971–72	Süper Lig	9th	30	10	9	11	32	32	0	39	R2	N/A	Fevzi Zemzem	15
1972–73	Süper Lig	8th	30	11	8	11	33	31	2	41	R2	N/A	Fevzi Zemzem	16
1973–74	Süper Lig	13th	30	8	10	12	24	28	−4	34	R1	N/A	Mehmet Türken	11
1974–75	Süper Lig	14th	30	4	17	9	36	23	13	29	–	N/A	Mehmet Türken	11
1975–76	Süper Lig	15th	30	7	12	11	31	32	−1	33	SF	N/A	Mehmet Türken	13
1976–77	Süper Lig	15th	30	8	9	13	21	31	−10	33	QF	N/A	Ali Çağlar	8
1977–78	1. Lig	1st	31	21	6	4	70	24	46	69	R2	N/A	–	–
1978–79	Süper Lig	10th	30	9	10	11	30	41	−11	37	L32	N/A	Sadullah Acele	9
1979–80	Süper Lig	14th	30	8	11	11	27	33	−6	35	L16	N/A	Sadullah Acele	9
1980–81	1. Lig	1st	32	22	8	4	71	18	53	74	R4	N/A	–	–
1981–82	Süper Lig	16th	32	4	8	20	17	53	−36	20	L32	N/A	Sadullah Acele	5
1982–83	1. Lig	5th	30	14	8	8	31	19	12	50	L32	N/A	–	–
1983–84	1. Lig	4th	30	11	12	7	38	31	7	45	R2	N/A	–	–
1984–85	1. Lig	3rd	30	14	10	6	38	23	15	52	L16	N/A	Sadullah Acele	11
1985–86	1. Lig	5th	34	13	11	10	48	41	7	50	R3	N/A	Sadullah Acele	13
1986–87	1. Lig	7th	34	16	7	11	47	37	10	55	L32	N/A	Sadullah Acele	11
1987–88	1. Lig	5th	32	14	6	12	50	47	3	48	–	N/A	–	–
1988–89	1. Lig	5th	34	17	5	12	46	31	15	56	R1	N/A	Zafer Altındağ	10
1989–90	1. Lig	2th	32	18	9	5	58	32	26	63	R1	N/A	Tahir Karapınar	10
1990–91	1. Lig	2th	34	25	4	5	81	30	51	79	R2	N/A	Hüsnü Akın	23
1991–92	1. Lig	4th	34	14	11	9	48	42	6	53	R2	N/A	Yaşar Akçura	13
1992–93	1. Lig	9th	38	14	6	18	44	54	−10	48	R1	N/A	İsmail Alan	11
1993–94	1. Lig	4th	32	14	7	11	42	39	3	49	R1	N/A	–	–
1994–95	1. Lig	4th	32	14	7	11	42	34	8	49	R2	N/A	Ayhan Korkmaz	15
1995–96	1. Lig	7th	36	15	8	13	45	40	5	53	R3	N/A	–	–
1996–97	1. Lig	7th	32	10	10	12	41	44	−3	40	–	N/A	–	–
1997–98	1. Lig	6th	32	10	12	10	39	44	−5	42	–	N/A	–	–
1998–99	1. Lig	3rd	39	23	6	10	68	51	17	75	–	N/A	–	–
1999–00	Süper Lig	17th	34	7	5	22	26	54	−28	26	R3	N/A	–	–
2000–01	1. Lig	1st	38	24	7	7	30	17	13	79	–	N/A	–	–
2001–02	Süper Lig	7th	34	12	9	13	38	56	−18	45	R4	N/A	Mustafa Özkan	11
2002–03	Süper Lig	17th	34	5	11	18	32	57	−25	26	R3	N/A	Zafer Biryol	8
2003–04	1. Lig	17th	34	8	9	17	36	62	−26	26	–	N/A	Nedim Vatansever	10
2004–05	2. Lig	16th	32	6	7	19	35	60	−25	25	–	N/A	–	–
2005–06	3. Lig	11th	30	9	8	13	29	31	−2	35	–	N/A	–	–
2006–07	3. Lig	15th	30	8	4	18	21	47	−26	28	–	N/A	–	–
2007–08	Amateur	2nd	22	14	4	4	53	17	36	46	–	N/A	Oliveira Junior	38
2008–09	3. Lig	1st	36	20	11	5	48	29	19	71	–	N/A	Recep Gayık	10
2009–10	2. Lig	8th	36	13	11	12	33	30	3	50	R1	N/A	Ferhat Çulcuoğlu	6
2010–11	2. Lig	1st	34	22	8	4	70	27	43	74	R1	N/A	Tayfun Özkan	18
2011–12	1. Lig	13th	34	11	8	15	36	43	−7	41	R2	N/A	İlhan Şahin	11
2012–13	1. Lig	16th	34	10	7	17	28	40	−12	37	L16	N/A	Ali Kuçik	8
2013–14	2. Lig	2nd	38	21	12	5	57	30	27	75	R2	N/A	Şaban Genişyürek	17
2014–15	2. Lig	1st	34	19	12	3	57	30	27	69	R3	N/A	Timur Kosovalı	13
2015–16	1. Lig	13th	34	9	11	14	38	40	−2	38	R3	N/A	Gökhan Karadeniz	9
2016–17	1. Lig	5th	33	15	7	11	54	50	4	52	GS	N/A	Adis Jahović	21
2017–18	Süper Lig	6th	34	13	10	11	49	50	−1	50	R3	N/A	Adis Jahović	14
2018–19	Süper Lig	15th	34	11	5	18	37	42	−5	38	QF	N/A	Yasin Öztekin	10
2019–20	Süper Lig	11th	34	11	9	14	44	49	−5	42	L16	N/A	Serdar Gürler	7
2020–21	Süper Lig	10th	40	13	12	15	59	59	0	51	L32	N/A	Cherif Ndiaye	12
2021–22	Süper Lig	19th	38	7	7	24	40	77	−37	28	L16	N/A	Cherif Ndiaye	10
2022–23	1. Lig	7th	36	17	9	10	45	31	14	60	R5	N/A	Yasin Öztekin	9
2023–24	1. Lig	2nd	34	21	7	6	60	20	40	70	R5	N/A	Yalçın Kayan	9
2024–25	Süper Lig	8th	36	13	11	12	59	50	9	50	SF	N/A	Rômulo	17
2025–26	Süper Lig	TBD												

=== League participations ===
- Süper Lig: 1959–77, 1978–80, 1981–82, 1999–2000, 2001–03, 2017–2022, 2024-
- 1. Lig: 1977–78, 1980–81, 1982–99, 2000–01, 2003–04, 2011–13, 2015–2017, 2022–2024
- 2. Lig: 2004–05, 2009–11, 2013–15
- 3. Lig: 2005–07, 2008–09
- Amateur League: 2007–08

== Göztepe in Europe ==
Göztepe competed in Europe seven times between 1964–65 and 1970–71: five editions of the Inter-Cities Fairs Cup and two of the UEFA Cup Winners' Cup, for a total of 30 official European matches (10 wins, 2 draws, 18 losses; goals 36–49). The club's best run came in the 1968–69 Inter-Cities Fairs Cup, when Göztepe became the first Turkish team to reach a European semi-final, eliminating Marseille, Argeș Pitești and OFK Beograd before falling to Újpest in the last four.

Back-to-back Turkish Cup wins took the club to the 1969–70 Cup Winners' Cup, where Göztepe knocked out Union Luxembourg and Cardiff City to reach the quarter-finals, losing to Roma (0–2 agg.; 0–2 in Rome, 0–0 in İzmir). In the 1970–71 Cup Winners' Cup they again beat Union Luxembourg in the first round before going out to Górnik Zabrze in the last 16 (0–4 agg.; 0–1 İzmir, 0–3 Zabrze). Göztepe's biggest European win was 5–0 against Union Luxembourg in İzmir (1970–71 Cup Winners' Cup), while their heaviest defeat was 9–1 away to 1860 München in the 1965–66 Fairs Cup.

=== Summary ===
As of 6 September 1972

Competition	Pld	W	D	L	GF	GA	GD
UEFA Cup Winners' Cup	10	4	1	5	14	10	+4
Inter-Cities Fairs Cup	20	6	1	13	22	39	−17
Balkans Cup	4	2	1	1	6	4	+2
Overall Total	34	12	3	19	42	53	–11

=== Achievements ===
Season	Achievement	Notes
Inter-Cities Fairs Cup
1968–69	Semi-finalist	eliminated by (Hungary) Újpest FC 1–4 in İzmir, 0–4 in Budapest
UEFA Cup Winners' Cup
1969–70	Quarter-finalist	eliminated by (Italy) Roma 0–0 in İzmir, 0–2 in Rome
Balkans Cup
1972	Group Stage	eliminated by (Bulgaria) Trakia Plovdiv, (Romania) Steagul Roșu Brașov

=== Results ===
Season	Competition	Round	Club	Home	Away	Aggregate
1964–65	Inter-Cities Fairs Cup	R1	(Romania) Petrolul Ploiești	0–1	1–2	1–3
1965–66	Inter-Cities Fairs Cup	R1	(West Germany) 1860 Munich	2–1	1–9	3–10
1966–67	Inter-Cities Fairs Cup	R1	(Italy) Bologna	1–2	1–3	2–5
1967–68	Inter-Cities Fairs Cup	R1	(Belgium) Royal Antwerp	0–0	2–1	2–1
1967–68	Inter-Cities Fairs Cup	R2	(Spain) Atlético Madrid	3–0	0–2	3–2
1967–68	Inter-Cities Fairs Cup	R3	(Socialist Federal Republic of Yugoslavia) Vojvodina	0–1	0–1	0–2
1968–69	Inter-Cities Fairs Cup	R1	(France) Marseille	2–0	0–2	2–2 (c)
1968–69	Inter-Cities Fairs Cup	R2	(Romania) Argeș Pitești	3–0	2–3	5–3
1968–69	Inter-Cities Fairs Cup	R3	(Socialist Federal Republic of Yugoslavia) OFK Beograd	2–0	1–3	3–3 (a)
1968–69	Inter-Cities Fairs Cup	QF	(West Germany) Hamburg	Hamburg withdrew		
1968–69	Inter-Cities Fairs Cup	SF	(Hungary) Újpest	1–4	0–4	1–8
1969–70	UEFA Cup Winners' Cup	R1	Union Luxembourg	3–0	3–2	6–2
1969–70	UEFA Cup Winners' Cup	R2	(Wales) Cardiff City	3–0	0–1	3–1
1969–70	UEFA Cup Winners' Cup	QF	(Italy) Roma	0–0	0–2	0–2
1970–71	UEFA Cup Winners' Cup	R1	Union Luxembourg	5–0	0–1	5–1
1970–71	UEFA Cup Winners' Cup	R2	(Poland) Górnik Zabrze	0–1	0–3	0–4

==== Balkans Cup ====
Season	Round	Club	Home	Away	Aggregate
1972	Group Stage (Group B)	(Bulgaria) Trakia Plovdiv	0–0	0–3	2nd
1972	Group Stage (Group B)	(Romania) Steagul Roșu Brașov	5–1	1–0	2nd

==== UEFA Ranking history ====
As of 1975

Season	Rank	Points	Ref.
1966	112 ▲	1.000	
1967	125 ▼	1.000	
1968	84 ▲	1.833	
1969	69 ▲	2.708	
1970	33 ▲	4.041	
1971	48 ▼	3.541	
1972	46 ▲	3.541	
1973	69 ▲	2.708	
1974	101 ▼	1.833	
1975	203 ▼	0.500	

== Current squad ==
As of 4 September 2026

Note: Flags indicate national team as defined under FIFA eligibility rules; some limited exceptions apply. Players may hold more than one non-FIFA nationality.

No.	Pos.	Nation	Player
1	GK	TUR	Arda Özçimen
2	MF	ALB	Arda Okan Kurtulan
3	DF	BRA	Allan Godói
4	DF	TUR	Taha Altıkardeş
5	MF	BRA	Rhaldney
6	MF	ENG	Alex Matos (on loan from Sheffield United)
7	FW	BRA	André Henrique
8	MF	SUI	Alexis Antunes
9	FW	BRA	Juan
10	MF	TUR	Efkan Bekiroğlu
12	DF	UAE	Richard Akonnor (on loan from Al Jazira)
13	DF	TUR	Ege Yıldırım
14	FW	TUR	Bekir Turaç Böke

No.	Pos.	Nation	Player
16	DF	TUR	Ogün Bayrak (captain)
17	FW	TUR	Gökdeniz Bayrakdar
18	MF	ENG	Tino Anjorin (on loan from Torino)
19	DF	GAM	Noah Sonko Sundberg
20	DF	TAN	Novatus Miroshi
21	GK	TUR	Nevzat Üzel
22	FW	IRL	Sinclair Armstrong
23	DF	TUR	Furkan Bayır
25	GK	GEO	Luka Gugeshashvili (on loan from PAOK)
26	DF	CMR	Malcom Bokele
27	FW	JOR	Ibrahim Sabra
33	GK	TUR	Mehmet Şamil Öztürk
39	FW	BRA	Janderson

=== Out on loan ===
Note: Flags indicate national team as defined under FIFA eligibility rules; some limited exceptions apply. Players may hold more than one non-FIFA nationality.

No.	Pos.	Nation	Player
—	FW	BRA	Jeh (at Partizan until 30 June 2027)
—	FW	TUN	Salem Bouajila (at Muğlaspor until 30 June 2027)
—	MF	TUR	Furkan Malak (at Aliağa FK until 30 June 2027)

No.	Pos.	Nation	Player
—	DF	TUR	Efe Can Mete (at Kırıkkale F.K. until 30 June 2027)
—	FW	BRA	Guilherme Luiz (at Radomiak Radom until 30 June 2027)
—	MF	TUN	Amin Cherni (at Nantes until 30 June 2027)

== Non-playing staff ==
=== Administrative Staff ===
Position	Name
Chairman	(Denmark) Rasmus Ankersen
Chief Executive Officer	(Denmark) Henrik Kraft
Executive Assistant	(Turkey) Ali Dönmez
Board of Directors	(Turkey) Kerem Ertan
Chief Operating Officer	(Italy) Roberto Gagliardi
Board Member	(Turkey) Enes Memiş
Honorary President	(Turkey) Mehmet Sepil

=== Coaching staff ===
Position	Name
Sporting Director	(Croatia) Ivan Mance
Head coach	(Bulgaria) Stanimir Stoilov
Assistant Coach	(Turkey) Ahmet Balcı
Assistant Coach	(Bulgaria) Tsanko Tsvetanov
Assistant Coach	(Bulgaria) Yontcho Arsov
Goalkeeping Coach	(Turkey) Süha Özen
Athletic Coach	(Turkey) Bumin Yıldız
Athletic Coach	(Croatia) Boris Peyrek
Match Analyst	(Turkey) Süleyman Yolcu
Scout	(Italy) Alessio Del Sarto
Scout	(Turkey) Yağmur Akyol

== Managerial history ==
Göztepe has seen a varied managerial history since its founding in 1925. The first officially recorded coach was Ruhi Karaduman, active in the late 1950s. The club's most iconic manager was Adnan Süvari, who led Göztepe to the semi-finals of the 1968–69 Inter-Cities Fairs Cup and the quarter-finals of the 1969–70 Cup Winners' Cup historic firsts for a Turkish side. Göztepe has employed a mix of domestic and international managers, including Oscar Hold (England), András Kuttik (Hungary), Ilie Datcu (Romania), and Stanimir Stoilov (Bulgaria).

Season(s)	Manager
1925–55	Unknown
1956–57	(Turkey) Ruhi Karaduman
1957–58	Unknown
1959–60	(Turkey) Ruhi Karaduman
1960	(Hungary) András Kuttik
1961–63	(Turkey) Adnan Süvari
1963–64	(Turkey) Bülent Eken
1964–71	(Turkey) Adnan Süvari
1971–72	(Romania) Dincă Schileru
1972–73	(Turkey) Sabri Kiraz
1972–73	(Turkey) Suphi Varer
1973–74	(Turkey) Necdet Niş
1974–75	(Turkey) Adnan Süvari
1975–76	(England) Oscar Hold
1976	(Turkey) Gürsel Aksel
1976–77	(Turkey) Nevzat Güzelırmak
1977–78	(Turkey) Fevzi Zemzem
1978–79	(Turkey) Tekin Yolaç
1979–80	(Turkey) Kadri Aytaç
1980	(Turkey) Halil Kiraz
1980	(Turkey) Nevzat Güzelırmak
1980–81	(Turkey) Fevzi Zemzem
1981	(Romania) Ilie Datcu
1981	(Turkey) Ülkü Coşkuner
1981	(Turkey) Erkan Velioğlu
1981–82	(Turkey) Adnan Süvari
1982	(Socialist Federal Republic of Yugoslavia) Zoran Ristić
1984–85	(Romania) Ilie Datcu
1986–87	(Turkey) Coşkun Süer
1989–90	(Turkey) Fatih Terim
1990	(Turkey) Nevzat Güzelırmak
1990–91	(Turkey) Ümit Kayihan
1991–92	(Turkey) Erkan Velioğlu
1992–93	(Turkey) Ümit Turmuş
1994–95	(Turkey) Fevzi Zemzem
1996	(Bosnia and Herzegovina) Kemal Omeragić
1996	(Turkey) Hüseyin Hamamcı
1996–97	(Turkey) Erkan Velioğlu
1997	(Turkey) Fevzi Zemzem
1997–98	(Turkey) Giray Bulak
1998–99	(Turkey) Erdoğan Arıca
1999	(Turkey) Oktay Çevik

Season(s)	Manager
1999–00	(Czech Republic) Jozef Jarabinský
2000	(Turkey) Celal Kıbrızlı
2000–01	(Turkey) Ümit Kayihan
2001–02	(Turkey) Rıza Çalımbay
2002	(Turkey) Ali Osman Renklibay
2002–03	(Turkey) Mustafa Fedai
2003	(Turkey) Ayfer Elmastaşoğlu
2004–05	(Turkey) Cem Pamiroğlu
2005	(Turkey) Oktay Çevik
2005–06	(Turkey) Sadullah Acele
2007–08	(Turkey) Rıza Tuyuran
2008–09	(Turkey) Mustafa Fedai
2009	(Turkey) Akif Başaran
2009–10	(Turkey) Erol Azgın
2010	(Turkey) Nurettin Yılmaz
2010–11	(Turkey) Özcan Kızıltan
2011–12	(Turkey) Cihat Arslan
2012	(Turkey) Hüseyin Kalpar
2012–13	(Turkey) Kemal Kılıç
2013	(Turkey) Erhan Altın
2013–14	(Turkey) Özgür Zengin
2014	(Turkey) Suat Kaya
2014–16	(Turkey) Metin Diyadin
2016	(Turkey) Önder Özen
2016	(Turkey) Mehmet Aurélio
2016–17	(Turkey) Okan Buruk
2017	(Turkey) Yılmaz Vural
2017–18	(Turkey) Tamer Tuna
2018	(Turkey) Bayram Bektaş
2018–19	(Turkey) Kemal Özdeş
2019	(Turkey) Tamer Tuna
2019–21	(Turkey) İlhan Palut
2021	(Turkey) Ünal Karaman
2021–22	(Serbia) Nestor El Maestro
2022	(Croatia) Stjepan Tomas
2022	(Turkey) Serdar Sabuncu
2022–23	(Turkey) Turgay Altay
2023–	(Bulgaria) Stanimir Stoilov

== Presidential history ==
Göztepe's presidential history reflects the club's long-standing connection with İzmir's local figures and business community. The club was led for decades by the Filibeli family, with Fehmi Simsaroğlu and later Şevket Filibeli serving during the formative years. In the modern era, Mehmet Sepil played a pivotal role in the club's resurgence, overseeing the club's return to the Süper Lig and laying the groundwork for professionalization and international partnerships. In 2022, Danish executive Rasmus Ankersen, co-founder of Sport Republic, assumed control as part of a broader strategic investment, marking the club's first foreign presidency.

Season(s)	President
1925	(Turkey) Rahmi Filibeli
1925–50	(Turkey) Fehmi Simsaroğlu
1950–62	(Turkey) Şevket Filibeli
1962–63	(Turkey) Şerif Tikveşli
1962–63	(Turkey) Sebahattin Süvari
1963–65	(Turkey) Saffet Kuyaş
1965–67	(Turkey) Macit Birsel
1967–68	(Turkey) Süleyman Filibeli
1968–70	(Turkey) Sebahattin Süvari
1970–73	(Turkey) Nuri Öz
1973	(Turkey) Rüştü Ünsal
1973	(Turkey) İsmail Tiryakiler
1973	(Turkey) Mekin Kutucular
1974	(Turkey) Nuri Öz
1975	(Turkey) Mekin Kutucular
1976	(Turkey) Özdemir Arnas
1976–78	(Turkey) Orhan Daut
1979	(Turkey) Selamet Batur
1980	(Turkey) Tacettin Hiçyılmaz
1981	(Turkey) Özdemir Arnas
1982–83	(Turkey) Muzaffer Atılgan
1984	(Turkey) Şerif Tikveşli
1985	(Turkey) Özdemir Arnas
1986–87	(Turkey) Coşkun Gencerler

Season(s)	President
1987	(Turkey) Halit Horozoğlu
1988	(Turkey) Ömer Köymen
1988	(Turkey) İbrahim Şavkar
1989	(Turkey) Cemal Gözümoğulları
1989–92	(Turkey) Özdemir Arnas
1993	(Turkey) Kenan Bilgiç
1993–94	(Turkey) Atilla Türkkal
1994	(Turkey) Taşdan Erdan
1995	(Turkey) Mustafa Cücen
1996	(Turkey) Bülen Özkul
1997	(Turkey) Levent Ürkmez
1997	(Turkey) Kamil Uçar
1998–00	(Turkey) Aydın Bilgin
2000–02	(Turkey) Hamdi Türkmen
2002–03	(Turkey) Feyyaz Gülmen
2003–05	(Turkey) İskender Tuğsuz
2005–06	(Turkey) Uğur Bostancıoğlu
2006–07	(Turkey) Levent Ürkmez
2007–08	(Turkey) Gündüz Balkan
2008	(Turkey) İsmail Hakkı Gül
2008–13	(Turkey) İmam Altınbaş
2013–14	(Turkey) Hüseyin Altınbaş
2014–22	(Turkey) Mehmet Sepil
2022–	(Denmark) Rasmus Ankersen

== Other sports ==
In addition to football, Göztepe operates as a multi-sport club with several active departments, continuing the Turkish tradition of comprehensive sports institutions. The club promotes participation and excellence across a wide variety of athletic disciplines:

- Volleyball – Göztepe has a long-standing presence in men's and women's volleyball, competing at regional and national levels. Their youth teams are known for producing local talent.
- Handball – The handball branch includes men's and women's teams, participating in amateur leagues and youth tournaments organized by the Turkish Handball Federation.
- Basketball – The club periodically competes in lower divisions of Turkish basketball and maintains basketball training programs for youth and schools in İzmir.
- Sailing – Located near the İzmir Gulf, Göztepe also has a strong tradition in sailing. The sailing branch trains young athletes and regularly participates in local regattas.
- Swimming & Windsurfing – Capitalizing on İzmir's coastal geography, Göztepe maintains competitive swimming and windsurfing teams, which have earned accolades in junior and amateur national events.
- Fencing, Archery, Gymnastics, and Triathlon – The club supports developmental programs in niche Olympic sports such as fencing, archery, gymnastics, and triathlon. These branches focus heavily on youth development and sports education.

Göztepe's dedication to multiple sports exemplifies its mission to build a sporting culture beyond football, nurturing athletic excellence and community involvement in İzmir and beyond.
