= Göztepe, Konak =

Göztepe
- Neighbourhood
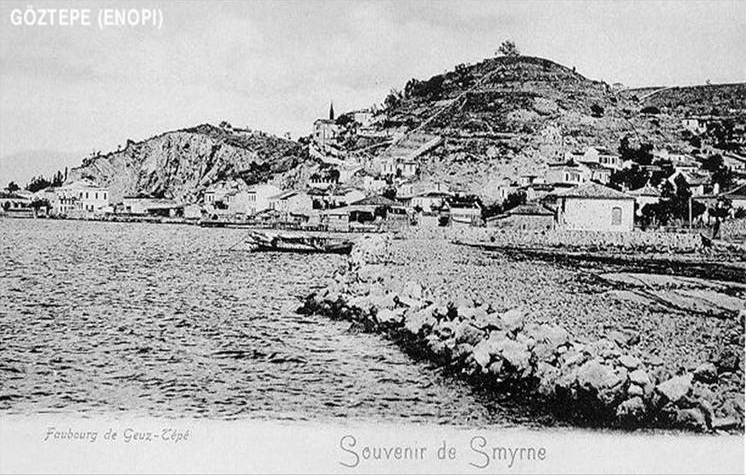
- Göztepe circa 1880

- Location within Turkey Location within İzmir
- Coordinates: 38°23′55″N 27°5′32″E
- Country: Turkey
- Province: İzmir
- District: Konak
- Population (2022): 15,897
- Time zone: UTC+3 (TRT)
- Area code: 0232

Göztepe is a neighbourhood in the municipality and district of Konak, İzmir Province, Turkey. Its population is 15,897 (2022). It is situated on the southern shore of the Gulf of İzmir. The neighborhood is also one of the eight quays of İzmir's urban ferry services operated by İzdeniz.

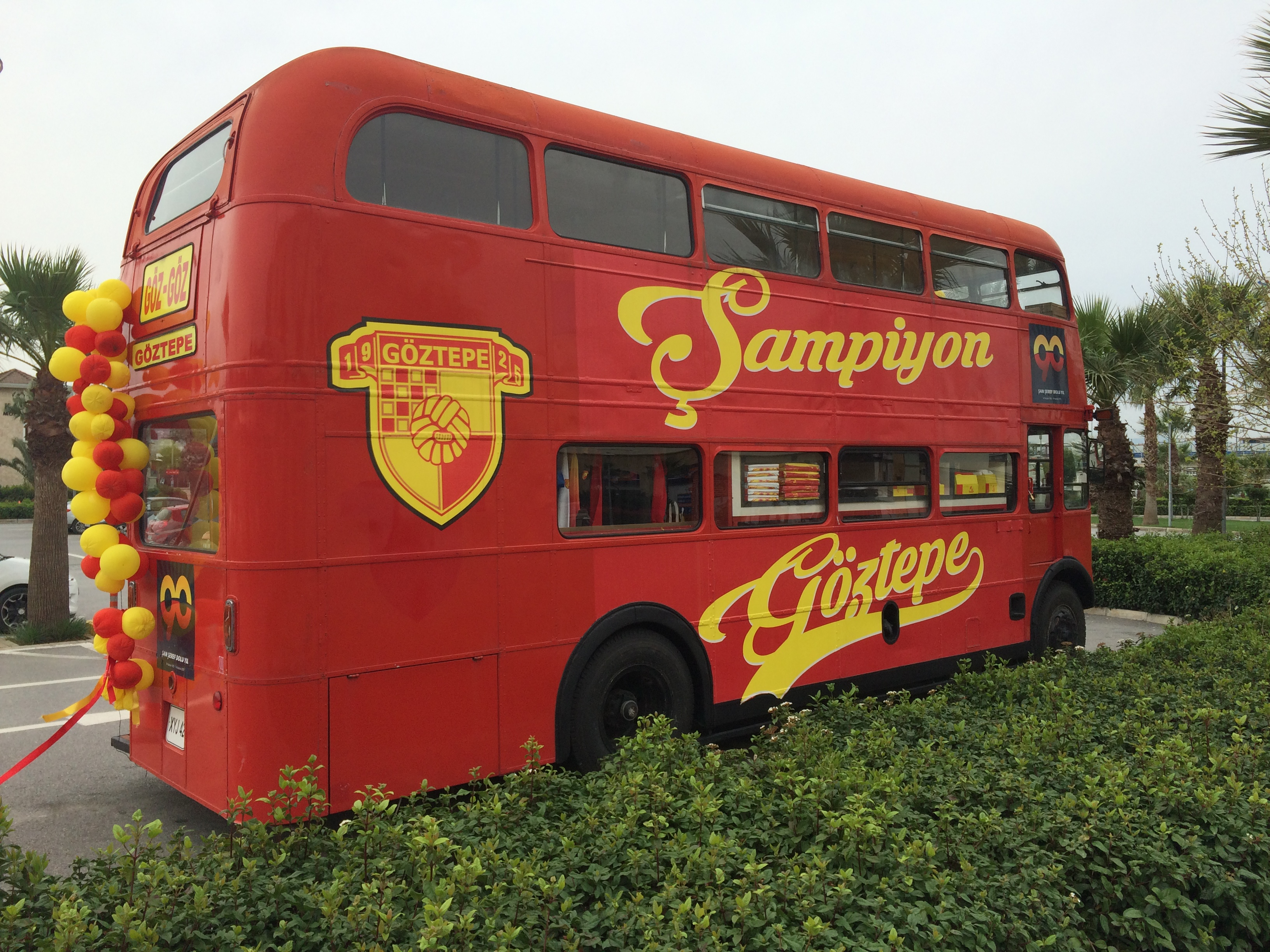
A double-decker bus decorated by Göztepe S.K. supporters

It is notable for its football club Göztepe S.K.

In Ottoman times, the alternative Greek name for Göztepe was "Enopi" and the area was a rich suburb inhabited principally by richer Greeks of İzmir.
