= Adnan Süvari =

Turkish football manager

Adnan Süvari (born 1926, Aydın, Turkey – d. 6 June 1991, Antalya, Turkey) was a Turkish football coach.

Under his leadership, Turkish side Göztepe played semifinals in the Inter-Cities Fairs Cup (1968–69) and quarterfinals in the UEFA Cup Winners' Cup (1969–70).

He died of a heart attack on June 6, 1991.

The 2026–27 Süper Lig season was named after him.
