= Gürsel Aksel =

Turkish footballer (1937–1978)

Personal information
- Full name: Gürsel Aksel
- Date of birth: 10 May 1937
- Place of birth: Uzunköprü, Turkey
- Date of death: 13 October 1978 (aged 41)
- Place of death: Rize, Turkey
- Height: 1.68 m (5 ft 6 in)
- Position: Midfielder

Youth career
- 1955–1959: Göztepe

Senior career*
Years	Team	Apps	(Gls)
1959–1972	Göztepe	390	(81)

International career
1964	Turkey U21	2	(0)
1965–1968	Turkey	3	(1)

Managerial career
- 1975–1976: Göztepe
- 1976–1977: Orduspor
- 1977–1978: Çaykur Rizespor
- * Club domestic league appearances and goals

Gürsel Aksel (10 May 1937 – 13 October 1978), was a Turkish footballer who played as a midfielder. Aksel spent his entire professional career with Göztepe, and is their most capped player in their history. He had three caps with the Turkey national football team, and after retiring was briefly a manager before his death in 1978.

== Professional career and death ==
Aksel joined Göztepe in 1955, at the same time as his brother Güler Aksel who was the first footballer to sign professionally for the team. He debuted professionally in 1959, and played 390 games with 81 goals over his 14 seasons with the team in the Süper Lig. He is the all-time appearance leader in the history of Göztepe, and their second-most prolific scorer.

After his career, Aksel had a brief stint in management with Göztepe, Orduspor, and Çaykur Rizespor. On 13 October 1978, Aksel died in an explosion in a gas station in Rize, Turkey. He was survived by his wife and two children. Göztepe's home stadium, Gürsel Aksel Stadium, is named in his honour.

== Honours ==
Göztepe

- Turkish Cup (2): 1968–69, 1969–70
