= Fevzi Zemzem =

Turkish footballer (1941–2022)

Personal information
- Date of birth: 27 June 1941
- Place of birth: İskenderun, Hatay, Turkey
- Date of death: 21 March 2022 (aged 80)
- Position: Striker

Senior career*
Years	Team	Apps	(Gls)
1960–1974	Göztepe	356	(144)

International career
1965	Turkey U21	2	(0)
1965–1969	Turkey	18	(6)
- * Club domestic league appearances and goals

Fevzi Zemzem (27 June 1941 – 21 March 2022) was a Turkish professional footballer who played as a striker for Göztepe and the Turkey national team.

== Playing career ==
Zemzem played for Göztepe for his entire fourteen-year professional career. He scored 136 goals Turkish league goals during that time and was the top scorer in the 1967–68 season. He was also the joint top-scorer in the 1968–69 season with 17 goals but asked that Metin Oktay receive the trophy instead.

In the second leg of the Turkish Cup final on 20 May 1970, Zemzem scored twice to help Göztepe to a 3–1 win on the night and a 4–3 win on aggregate against Eskişehirspor. On 28 June 1970, he scored in the Turkish Super Cup as Göztepe defeated Fenerbahçe 3–1 to secure the title.

At the international level, Zemzem played 18 times for the Turkey senior national team.

== Managerial career ==
His first accomplishment came when he was the coach of Orduspor. That year Orduspor finished fourth in the league and qualified for the UEFA Cup. Samsunspor (1981–82) and Diyarbakırspor (in 1985–86 season) were promoted to premier league thanks to Zemzem's coaching. Tanju Çolak and Dobi Hasan were his students.

== Honours ==
Göztepe

- Turkish Cup: 1968–69, 1969–70; runner-up: 1966–67
- Turkish Super Cup: 1970; runner-up: 1969

Individual

- Gol Kralı: 1967–68
- Turkish Cup top scorer: 1969–70

== See also ==
- List of Süper Lig top scorers
- Metin Oktay
