= Afghanistan–Pakistan sports rivalries =

Afghanistan–Pakistan sporting relations

- Pakistan: Afghanistan

Pakistan and Afghanistan share a regional sporting rivalry that extends into various sports, especially cricket and football. The rivalry is attributed to the historical, cultural and political relationship between the neighbouring countries.

== History ==
In Afghanistan, sporting contests against Pakistan are followed intensely. The rivalry, stemming from geopolitical and cultural ties between the two states, has been compared in some aspects to the more longstanding, traditional archrivalry between India and Pakistan in sports.

The two countries share a long and porous international border dating back to the 19th century, with a history of immigration and economic relations. People on both sides of the border, primarily the Pashtuns, share ethnic and cultural ties. However, at a political level, relations between both governments in the past have often been characterised as frosty, thus paving the way for a competitive rivalry in sporting encounters in recent times.

== Olympics ==
Afghanistan made its first appearance at the Summer Olympics in 1936, while Pakistan's first appearance was in 1948. Pakistan have won 11 Olympic medals since 1956, including four golds. Afghanistan have won two bronze medals, in 2008 and 2012, with The Guardian reporting that there was "elation that Afghanistan had bettered" their medal tally against Pakistan in the 2012 games.

As of the 2024 Summer Olympics:

	Pakistan	Afghanistan
Medal ranking	78th	150th
Gold	4	0
Silver	3	0
Bronze	4	2
Total	11	2

=== Head to head ===
Pakistani and Afghan athletes have only directly competed against each other at the Olympics in men's wrestling events. Every time Pakistani athletes have come out on top. In 1960, Pakistan's Muhammad Akhtar defeated Afghanistan's Mohammad Ebrahim Khedri in the first round of the freestyle featherweight category by 4–0. In the freestyle middleweight category, Pakistan's Faiz Muhammad beat Afghanistan's Mohammad Asif Kohkan in the third round by 3–1. In the freestyle heavyweight category, Pakistan's Muhammad Nazir also won against Afghanistan's Nizamuddin Subhani in the second round by 3–1.

In 1972, Pakistan's Muhammad Yaghoub and Afghanistan's Shakar Khan Shakar drew in the second round of the freestyle 74 kg event.

== Cricket ==
Afghanistan–Pakistan cricket rivalry
- Sport: Cricket
- Teams: Pakistan; Afghanistan
- First meeting: 10 February 2012 (ODI); 8 December 2013 (T20I)
- Latest meeting: 23 October 2023 (ODI); 2 September 2025 (T20I)

Statistics
- Total meetings: ODI: 8 T20I: 9
- Most wins: ODI: Pakistan (7); T20I: Pakistan (5)

=== History ===
Cricket in Afghanistan was popularised by Afghan expatriates who learnt the sport while living in Pakistan in the 1980s and 1990s, during the post-Soviet invasion era. Most members of the early Afghanistan national cricket team grew up in northwest Pakistan and participated in the country's domestic cricket structure, making use of cricket facilities in Peshawar with the support of the Pakistan Cricket Board (PCB). It was during this time that the Afghanistan Cricket Federation (now ACB) was also founded, in 1995. The ACF received recognition from the International Cricket Council (ICC) in 2001.

Several future cricketers representing Afghanistan emerged from Peshawar's club cricket scene, establishing an Afghan cricket club to compete against other local Pakistani sides in the 1990s. Afghanistan fielded their cricket team in Pakistan's domestic setup for the first time in the 2001–02 season, participating in the second division of the Quaid-e-Azam Trophy where they drew two and lost three of their five games. They returned for the Cornelius Trophy in the 2002–03 season, drawing one and losing three matches. In the 2003–04 season, they made an appearance in the PCB's inter-district tournament in Peshawar, where they registered their lone victory against Swabi, drew twice and lost two matches.

The Afghanistan national team was coached by former Pakistani cricketers Kabir Khan and Rashid Latif in its initial years. During this period, a number of Afghan international cricketers made appearances for Pakistani domestic outfits in the first-class circuit. In 2010, Afghanistan competed at the Asian Games, a non-ICC T20 event hosted by China, where they defeated a second-string Pakistan side by 22 runs in the semi-finals in what was considered an upset. In May 2011, the Afghan side embarked on a tour of Pakistan to partake in a three-match limited overs series against Pakistan A, where they were whitewashed by the home side 3–0. They followed this up with another tour in September to participate in Pakistan's domestic National T20 Cup in Karachi as the Afghan Cheetahs, but had another poor outing, losing all three of their matches.

On 10 February 2012, Afghanistan played a one-off One Day International (ODI) match against Pakistan at Sharjah, the first ever official game between the two sides and also the first ever ODI between an Affiliate and a Test-playing nation. Billed as a historic occasion for Afghan cricket, the game was won comfortably by Pakistan by seven wickets with 13 overs to spare.

In February 2013, Afghanistan visited Pakistan to play a series of limited-overs matches against the Pakistan A team and some regional sides. They played five one-dayers and a Twenty20 at three venues around the country. They won their first limited overs game against Hyderabad–Karachi by nine wickets, but lost their matches against Bahawalpur–Multan and Faisalabad–Rawalpindi. In their matches against Pakistan A, they were clean swept by the Pakistani side 2–0 in the one day series and 1–0 in the T20 series. In March, the PCB and ACB inked a two-year memorandum of understanding allowing Afghanistan to use Pakistan's cricket facilities such as the National Cricket Academy and seek technical assistance for the purpose of further developing Afghan cricket. Later in December that year, Pakistan and Afghanistan faced each other in a one-off T20I in Sharjah, where Pakistan prevailed with a six wicket victory with a ball to spare. Since then, the two sides have clashed in the ODI and T20I formats on multiple occasions. In World Cup 2023 Afghanistan beat Pakistan in a match played on October 23, 2023. Ibrahim Zadran, who was awarded player of the match award, dedicated the win to “people who are sent from Pakistan back home to Afghanistan”. His statement was considered controversial especially from Pakistan side amid the decision from Pakistan to deport all illegal Afghan citizens.

=== Results ===
Format	Matches played	Pakistan won	Afghanistan won	Draw/Tie/No Result	Notes
ODI	8	7	1	0	
T20I	10	6	4	0	
Total	18	13	5	0	

==== ICC tournaments ====
The teams have met on three occasions in ICC tournaments, with Pakistan winning two of these meetings and Afghanistan winning one.

Tournament	Matches played	Pakistan won	Afghanistan won	Draw/Tie/No result
World Cup	2	1	1	0
T20 World Cup	1	1	0	0
Total	3	2	1	0

==== ACC tournaments ====
In Asian Cricket Council (ACC) tournaments, both sides have met on five occasions. Pakistan have won on three occasions, while Afghanistan have won two games.

Tournament	Matches played	Pakistan won	Afghanistan won	Draw/Tie/No result
Asia Cup ODI	2	2	0	0
Asia Cup T20	1	1	0	0
Asian Games	1	0	1	0
Total	5	3	1	0

=== List of ODI series ===
Year(s)	Host	Date of first match	Matches	Pakistan won	Afghanistan won	Tie/No Result	Winner
2011–12	United Arab Emirates	10 February 2012	1	1	0	0	Pakistan
2023	Sri Lankan	22 August 2023	3	3	0	0	Pakistan

=== List of T20I series ===
Year(s)	Host	Date of first match	Matches	Pakistan won	Afghanistan won	Tie/No Result	Winner
2013–14	United Arab Emirates	8 December 2013	1	1	0	0	Pakistan
2022–23	United Arab Emirates	24 March 2023	3	1	2	0	Afghanistan

=== Records ===
==== ODI records ====
The following are team and individual records in One Day Internationals played between the two sides.

===== Team =====
Highest innings total
Score	Team	Venue	Season
302/9 (49.5 overs)	Pakistan	Hambantota	2023
257/6 (50.0 overs)	Afghanistan	Abu Dhabi	2018–19
248/8 (50.0 overs)	Pakistan	Fatullah	2013–14
258/7 (49.3 overs)	Pakistan	Abu Dhabi	2018–19
257/6 (50.0 overs)	Afghanistan	Abu Dhabi	2018–19
248/8 (50.0 overs)	Pakistan	Fatullah	2013–14
Source: ESPNcricinfo.

Lowest innings total
Score	Team	Venue	Season
59 (19.2 overs)	Afghanistan	Hambantota	2023
195 (48.3 overs)	Afghanistan	Sharjah	2011–12
176 (47.2 overs)	Afghanistan	Fatullah	2013–14
195 (48.3 overs)	Afghanistan	Sharjah	2011–12
227/9 (50.0 overs)	Afghanistan	Leeds	2019
Source: ESPNcricinfo.

Largest victory (by runs)
Margin	Winning team	Venue	Season
142 runs	Pakistan	Hambantota	2023
72 runs	Pakistan	Fatullah	2013–14
Source: ESPNcricinfo.

Smallest victory (by wickets)
Margin	Winning team	Venue	Season
1 wickets	Pakistan	Hambantota	2023
3 wickets	Pakistan	Abu Dhabi	2018–19
3 wickets	Pakistan	Leeds	2019
Source: ESPNcricinfo.

===== Individual =====
Most career runs
Runs	Player	Years
149 (3 innings)	Asghar Afghan (Afghanistan)	2014–19
116 (2 innings)	Imam-ul-Haq (Pakistan)	2018–present
111 (2 innings)	Babar Azam (Pakistan)	2018–present
Source: ESPNcricinfo.

Highest individual score
Runs	Player	Venue	Date
102*	Umar Akmal (Pakistan)	Fatullah	27 Feb 2014
97*	Hashmatullah Shahidi (Afghanistan)	Abu Dhabi	21 Sep 2018
80	Imam-ul-Haq (Pakistan)	Abu Dhabi	21 Sep 2018
Source: ESPNcricinfo.

Most career wickets
Wickets	Player	Matches	Bowling average
6	Shahid Afridi (Pakistan)	2	11.16
6	Shaheen Shah Afridi (Pakistan)	2	14.16
4	Wahab Riaz (Pakistan)	2	16.50
Source: ESPNcricinfo.

Best bowling figures
Bowling	Player	Venue	Date
5/36	Shahid Afridi (Pakistan)	Sharjah	10 Feb 2012
4/47	Shaheen Shah Afridi (Pakistan)	Leeds	29 Jun 2019
3/29	Mohammad Hafeez (Pakistan)	Fatullah	27 Feb 2014
Source: ESPNcricinfo.

==== T20I records ====
The following are team and individual records in Twenty20 Internationals played between the two sides.

===== Team =====
Highest innings total
Score	Team	Venue	Season				
182/7 (20.0 overs)	Pakistan	Sharjah	2025-26	148/5 (19.0 overs)	Pakistan	Dubai	2021–22
147/6 (20.0 overs)	Afghanistan	Dubai	2021–22				
138/4 (19.5 overs)	Pakistan	Sharjah	2013–14				
Source: ESPNcricinfo.

Lowest innings total
Score	Team	Venue	Season
129/6 (20.0 overs)	Afghanistan	Sharjah	2022
137/8 (20.0 overs)	Afghanistan	Sharjah	2013–14
147/6 (20.0 overs)	Afghanistan	Dubai	2021–22
Source: ESPNcricinfo.

Largest victory (by wickets)
Margin	Winning team	Venue	Season
6 wickets	Pakistan	Sharjah	2013–14
Source: ESPNcricinfo.

Smallest victory (by wickets)
Margin	Winning team	Venue	Season
1 wicket	Pakistan	Sharjah	2022
Source: ESPNcricinfo.

===== Individual =====
Most career runs
Runs	Player	Years
88 (4 innings)	Mohammad Nabi (Afghanistan)	2013–present
77 (4 innings)	Najibullah Zadran (Afghanistan)	2013–present
52 (2 innings)	Mohammad Hafeez (Pakistan)	2013–2021
Source: ESPNcricinfo.

Highest individual score
Runs	Player	Venue	Date
51	Babar Azam (Pakistan)	Dubai	29 Oct 2021
42*	Mohammad Hafeez (Pakistan)	Sharjah	8 Dec 2013
38	Najibullah Zadran (Afghanistan)	Sharjah	8 Dec 2013
Source: ESPNcricinfo.

Most career wickets
Wickets	Player	Matches	Bowling average
4	Rashid Khan (Afghanistan)	2	12.75
3	Junaid Khan (Pakistan)	1	8.00
3	Fareed Ahmad (Afghanistan)	1	10.33
Source: ESPNcricinfo.

Best bowling figures
Bowling	Player	Venue	Date
3/24	Junaid Khan (Pakistan)	Sharjah	8 Dec 2013
3/31	Fazalhaq Farooqi (Afghanistan)	Sharjah	7 Sep 2022
3/31	Fareed Ahmad (Afghanistan)	Sharjah	7 Sep 2022
Source: ESPNcricinfo.

== Football ==
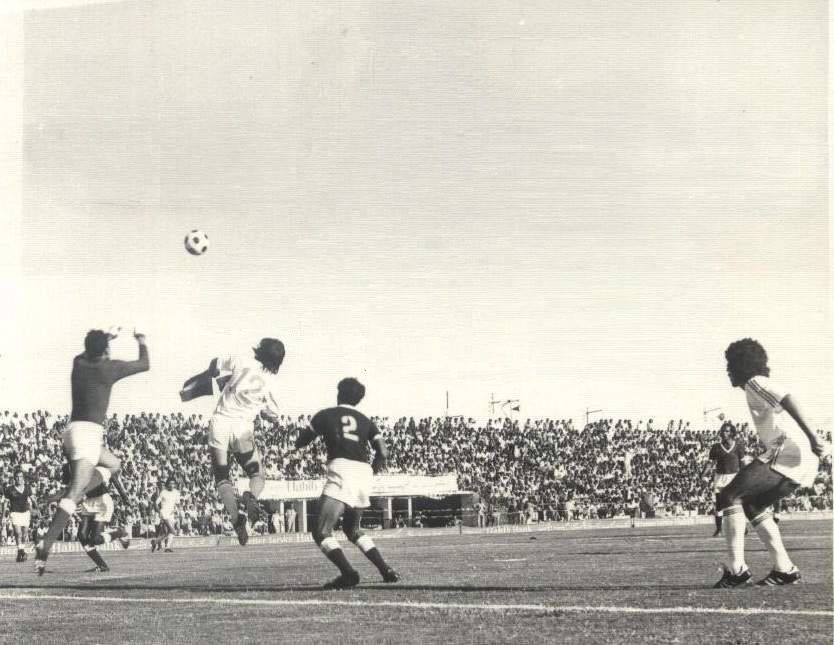
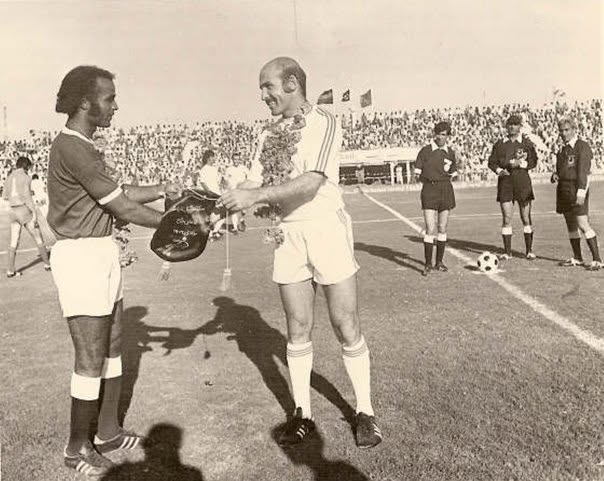
Pakistan vs Afghanistan at the 1976 Quaid-e-Azam International Tournament

The national teams of Pakistan and Afghanistan first met at the 1976 Afghanistan Republic Day Festival Cup, where the A team of Afghanistan won by 1–0, with Mohammad Saber Rohparwar scoring the lone goal on a corner kick minutes before game's end. Because of rising tensions between the two countries in the 1970s, Afghan president Mohammad Daoud Khan handed each player 5,000 afghanis as a celebration and gift for their victory. Both teams met again at the 1976 Quaid-e-Azam International Tournament the same year where Pakistan avenged by winning by the same score, with forward Afzal Qasim scoring the winning goal in the eighth minute after the kick off. A Pakistani selection named Shaheen FC again participated in the Afghan tournament in 1977.

The ensuing civil war and political instability in Afghanistan prevented the two sides from meeting again until 2003. Contests against Pakistan generate much enthusiasm amongst football fans on account of their mutual relations and have been referred to as a "rivalry".

=== Matches ===
#	Date	Venue	Competition	Home team	Score	Away team	Goals (home)	Goals (away)
1	19 July 1976	Ghazi Stadium, Kabul, Afghanistan	Afghanistan Republic Day Festival Cup	Afghanistan	1–0	Pakistan	Rohparwar	
2	12 October 1976	Hockey Club, Karachi, Pakistan	1976 Quaid-e-Azam International Tournament	Pakistan	1–0	Afghanistan	Qasim 8'	
3	14 January 2003	Bangabandhu Stadium Dhaka, Bangladesh	2003 South Asian Football Federation Gold Cup	Pakistan	1–0	Afghanistan	Rasool 9'	
4	9 December 2005	People's Football Stadium Karachi, Pakistan	2005 South Asian Football Federation Gold Cup	Pakistan	1–0	Afghanistan	Essa 55'	
5	20 August 2013	Afghanistan Football Federation Stadium Kabul, Afghanistan	Friendly	Afghanistan	3–0	Pakistan	Ahmadi 20' Hatifi 32' Mohammadi 71'	
6	6 February 2015	Punjab Stadium Lahore, Pakistan	Friendly	Pakistan	2–1	Afghanistan	Riaz 18' Saadullah 91'	Sharifi 56'
7	9 October 2025	Jinnah Stadium Islamabad, Pakistan	2027 AFC Asian Cup qualification	Pakistan	0–0	Afghanistan		
8	14 October 2025	Ali Sabah Al-Salem Stadium Farwaniya, Kuwait	2027 AFC Asian Cup qualification	Afghanistan	1–1	Pakistan	Hanifi 5'	Hussain 29'
9	7 June 2026	National Football Stadium Malé, Maldives	2026 Diamond Jubilee International Football Tournament	Afghanistan	0–2	Pakistan		Nawaz 5', Hamid 90+2'
10	10 June 2026	National Football Stadium Malé, Maldives	2026 Diamond Jubilee International Football Tournament	Pakistan	2–0	Afghanistan	Dost 24', Hamid 90+4'	

=== Results ===
Pakistan wins	6
Afghanistan wins	2
Draws	2
Total matches	10

Pakistan goals	10
Afghanistan goals	6

== See also ==
- Afghanistan–Pakistan relations
