= 1983 National Football Championship (Pakistan) =

Tournament details
- Country: Pakistan
- Venue(s): Railway Stadium, Lahore
- Dates: 18 October 1983 – 18 November 1983

Final positions
- Champions: WAPDA
- Runners-up: Habib Bank

The 1983 National Football Championship was the 31st edition of the National Football Championship, Pakistan's premier domestic football competition. It was played from 18 October to 18 November 1983. Preliminary rounds were held at Peshawar, Multan, Karachi and Quetta, and eight teams qualified for the final round, which was contested on a round-robin league pattern at Railway Stadium from 7 November onwards.

== Overview ==
The 1983 National Football Championship was played from 18 October to 18 November 1983. Preliminary rounds were held at Peshawar, Multan, Karachi and Quetta, and eight teams qualified for the final round, which was contested on a round-robin league pattern at Railway Stadium from 7 November onwards. Group A was composed of Pakistan Army, Pakistan Airlines, Sibi Division and WAPDA, while group B consisted of Habib Bank, National Bank, Pakistan Railways and Quetta Division.

In the opening match of the final round, Habib Bank defeated Pakistan Railways 1–0, thanks to a goal by Iqbal Yousaf in the 38th minute following a play by Lal Bakhsh and Faiz Sr. In the other fixture, Pakistan Army defeated Sibi 3–0, with an opening goal in the 22nd minute through their captain Shoaibullah Khan on a pass from left-winger Aziz. In the second half Sibi conceded two more goals.

The match between PIA and WAPDA ended in a 1–1 draw. Ghulam Sarwar Sr. scored for PIA in the 3rd minute, but their defender Naeem Gul deflected a kick from WAPDA's Baqar Ali into his own goal in the 29th minute. WAPDA failed to score a penalty-kick in the 52nd minute.

Habib Bank won their second successive match by defeating Quetta 2–0. Lal Bakhsh scored in the 40th minute on a move initiated by Ejaz, the second goal came in the 86th minute through substitute Salah. In the other fixture of the day, WAPDA defeated Pakistan Army 3–0. Army defender Muhammad Naveed, while making clearance, deflected the ball in his own goal in the 12th minute, Imtiaz Rana scored in the 33rd minute and the third goal was scored in the 67th minute by Sharafat Ali who was put through by Naseem Zaidi.

PIA were eliminated after losing to Pakistan Army, the lone goal was scored by Shoaibullah Khan in the 24th minute. PIA completed their three-match group stage collecting only 3 points while Army collected four points. Pakistan Railways scored a lone goal victory over National Bank through Javed in the 20th minute from a pass by right-winger Muhammad Rasheed. Habib Bank defeated National Bank 2–1. Habib Bank scored in the 16th minute through Yousaf Khan off a pass by Lal Bakhsh, but 10 minutes later Asif Siddiqui equalised for National Bank through a cross pass by Rashid. In the second half NBP were awarded a penalty-kick but Qazi Asif failed to score it. HBL scored the match winner in the 77th minute through Ejaz. In the other match WAPDA won the match against Sibi by 7–2. Quetta entered into the semifinals with a 2–0 win over Pakistan Railways. Karim scored in the final moments of the first half while Khaliq scored in the 7th minute of the second half.

In the first semi-final, Habib Bank defeated Pakistan Army 2–0. Abdul Latif scored in the 43rd minute while striker Faiz Sr. scored in the 50th minute. In the other semi-final, WAPDA won by 3–1 over Quetta. WAPDA scored in the 11th minute through Sharafat Ali but it was equalised in the 40th minute by Sharif. Sharafat scored again in the 60th minute and captain Khalid Butt scored the third goal for WAPDA in the 72nd minute.

In the final, WAPDA won against Habib Bank 5–4 in the penalty shoot-out thanks to the last save by WAPDA goalkeeper Taj Mohammad. Habib Bank's left-half Iqbal Umar scored in the 8th minute, but WAPDA equalised later with the game ending in a 1–1 scoreline.

== Preliminary round ==
Preliminary rounds were held at Peshawar, Multan, Karachi and Quetta, and eight teams qualified for the final round.

== Final round ==
=== Group A ===
Pos	Team	Pld	W	D	L	GF	GA	GD	Pts	Qualification
1	WAPDA	3	2	1	0	11	3	+8	5	Qualified for semi-finals
2	Pakistan Army	3	2	0	1	4	3	+1	4	Qualified for semi-finals
3	PIA	2	0	1	1	1	2	−1	1	
4	Sibi Division	2	0	0	2	2	10	−8	0	

7 November 1983

Pakistan Army	3–0	Sibi Division
Shoaibullah Khan 22' ? ?

November 1983

PIA	1–1	WAPDA
Sarwar Sr. 3'		Gul 29' (o.g.)

November 1983

WAPDA	3–0	Pakistan Army
Naveed 12' (o.g.); Imtiaz Rana 33'; Sharafat 67'

November 1983

WAPDA	7–2	Sibi Division

November 1983

Pakistan Army	1–0	PIA
Shoaibullah Khan 24'

November 1983

PIA	N/A	Sibi Division

=== Group B ===
Pos	Team	Pld	W	D	L	GF	GA	GD	Pts	Qualification
1	Habib Bank	3	3	0	0	5	1	+4	6	Qualified for semi-finals
2	Quetta Division	2	1	0	1	2	2	0	2	Qualified for semi-finals
3	Pakistan Railways	3	1	0	2	1	3	−2	2	
4	National Bank of Pakistan	2	0	0	2	1	3	−2	0	

7 November 1983

Habib Bank	1–0	Pakistan Railways
Iqbal Yousaf 38'

November 1983

Habib Bank	2–0	Quetta Division
Lal Bakhsh 40'; Salah 86'

November 1983

Pakistan Railways	1–0	National Bank of Pakistan
Javed 20'

November 1983

Habib Bank	2–1	National Bank of Pakistan
Yousaf Khan 16'; Ejaz 77'		Asif Siddiqui 26'

November 1983

Quetta Division	2–0	Pakistan Railways
Karim 45'; Khaliq 52'

November 1983

Quetta Division	N/A	National Bank of Pakistan

== Knockout stage ==
=== Semi-finals ===
November 1983

Habib Bank	2–0	Pakistan Army
Abdul Latif 43'; Faiz Sr. 50'

November 1983

WAPDA	3–1	Quetta Division
Sharafat 11', 60'; Butt 72'		Sharif 40'

=== Final ===
18 November 1983

WAPDA	1–1	Habib Bank
?		Iqbal Umar 8'
Penalties
	5–4
