= Muhammad Idrees (footballer) =

Pakistani footballer and manager

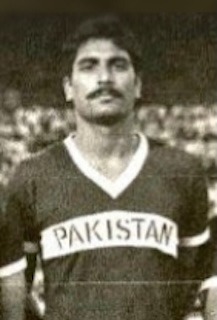
- Idrees with Pakistan in 1978

Personal information
- Full name: Muhammad Idrees
- Date of birth: Unknown
- Position: Left winger

Senior career*
Years	Team	Apps	(Gls)
1973–1975	Pakistan Railways		
1975–1985	Pakistan Airlines		

International career
1973	Pakistan Youth		
1973–1978	Pakistan		

Managerial career
- 1986: Pakistan B
- 1995: Pakistan U23
- 1996–1999: Pakistan
- * Club domestic league appearances and goals

Muhammad Idrees (Urdu: محمد ادریس) is a Pakistani former footballer who played as a left winger, and manager. Idrees represented Pakistan national team from 1973 till 1978, and later served as head coach of the national team from 1996 till 1999.

== Club career ==
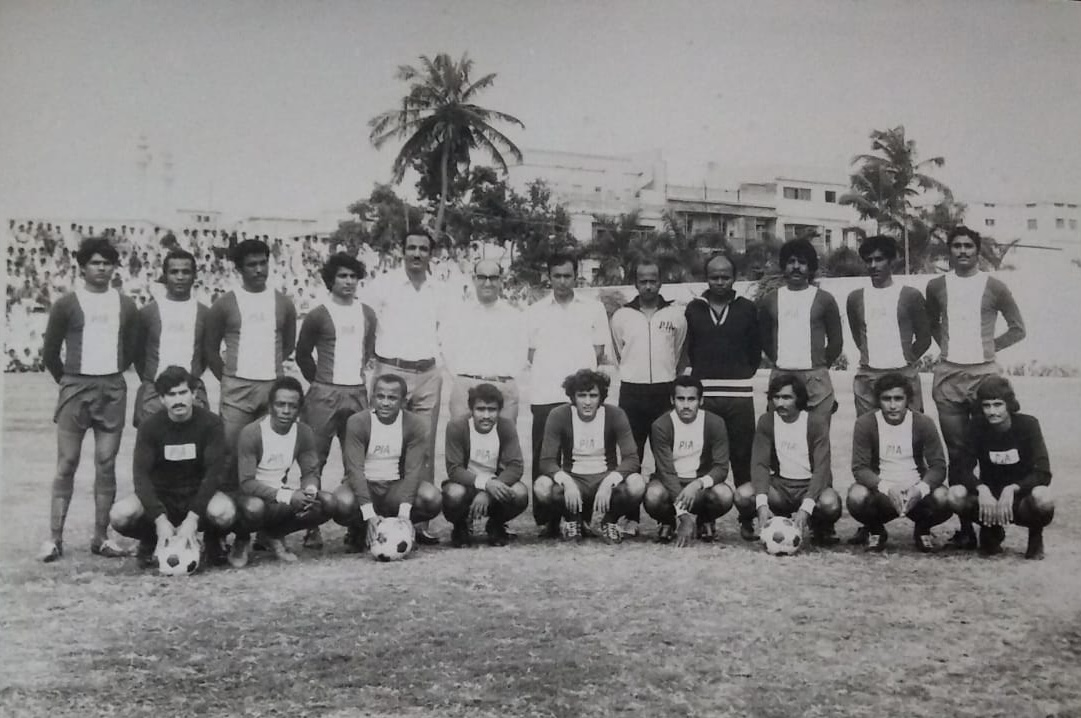
Idrees standing far right with Pakistan Airlines in 1975

Idrees played for Lahore based Pakistan Railways before moving to Karachi based team Pakistan Airlines in 1975. He won the National Football Championship four times with Pakistan Airlines. In the 1981 final, Idrees scored a brace in a 2–2 draw against Pakistan Air Force, until winning the title through penalties. He also helped them win the 1984 Inter-Provincial Championship. He represented Pakistan Airlines in the 1977 and 1982 editions of the Aga Khan Gold Cup.

During the 1970s, Idrees was one of several Pakistani players which represented club sides in and coached the clubs’ new youth setups in the Middle East.

== International career ==
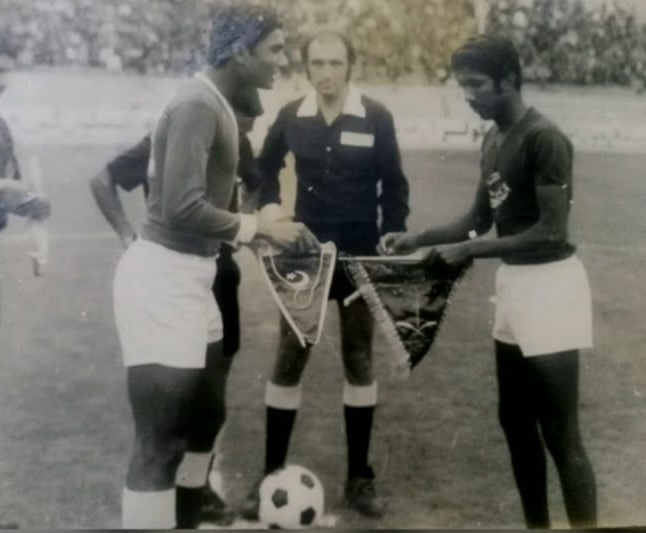
Muhammad Idrees (left) and Saudi Arabia captain (right) exchanging pennant flags during the 1973 AFC Youth Championship

Idrees captained the Pakistan Youth team at the 1973 AFC Youth Championship. He was then selected to play for Pakistan for a tour to the far east, where he scored against China on 10 June 1973, in a 4–7 defeat. The following year, Idrees scored against the Iranian opposition in a 1–2 defeat, and provided a last moment assist to Ali Nawaz Baloch in the eventual 2–2 tie against Turkey in the 1974 RCD Cup. The same year, he participated in the 1974 Asian Games, scoring a goal in a 1–5 defeat against Burma.

In 1976, Idrees participated at the Afghanistan Republic Day Festival Cup with the national team. Idrees then played at the 1976 Quaid-e-Azam International Tournament representing the Pakistan Greens. In 1978, Idrees participated with the national team at the Saudi Arabia Football Federation International Tournament, where he scored a brace against Kenya in a 8–3 defeat.

== Coaching career ==
In 1985, Idrees served as head coach of the second string Pakistan Whites at the 1986 Quaid-e-Azam International Tournament. In 1995, he served as head coach of the Pakistan national under-23 football team at the 1996 Summer Olympics Qualifiers.

In 1996, Idrees was appointed as the head coach of the Pakistan national football team for the 1996 AFC Asian Cup qualification. The next year, he coached the team for the FIFA World Cup qualifiers. Under his supervision in the 1997 SAFF Gold Cup, Pakistan went on to achieve a third-place finish in the tournament. He last served as coach at the 1999 SAFF Gold Cup.

== Career statistics ==
=== International goals ===
Scores and results list Pakistan's goal tally first, score column indicates score after each Idrees goal.

List of international goals scored by Muhammad Idrees
No.	Date	Venue	Opponent	Score	Result	Competition	Ref.
1	10 June 1973	Workers' Stadium, Beijing, China	China		4–7	Friendly	
2	5 September 1974	Amjadieh Stadium, Tehran, Iran	Bahrain	3–0	5–1	1974 Asian Games	
3	7 September 1974	Aryamehr Stadium, Tehran, Iran	Burma		1–5	1974 Asian Games	
4	9 May 1978	Riyadh, Saudi Arabia	Kenya		3–8	Saudi Arabia Football Federation International Tournament	
5	9 May 1978	Riyadh, Saudi Arabia	Kenya		3–8	Saudi Arabia Football Federation International Tournament	

== Honours ==
=== Pakistan Airlines ===
- National Football Championship:
  - Winners (4): 1975, 1976, 1978, 1981
- Inter-Provincial Championship:
  - Winners (1): 1984

=== Managerial ===
==== Pakistan ====
- SAFF Gold Cup:
  - third-place: 1997

== See also ==
- List of Pakistan national football team managers
