= Afghan cricket team against Pakistan in the UAE in 2011–12 =

Afghan cricket team vs Pakistan in the UAE in 2011–12
	Afghanistan	Pakistan
- Date: 10 February 2012
Captains	Nawroz Mangal	Misbah-ul-Haq

One Day International series
- Results: Pakistan won the 1-match series 1–0
Most runs	Karim Sadiq (40)	Younis Khan (70)
Most wickets	Dawlat Zadran (2)	Shahid Afridi (5)
- Player of the series: Shahid Afridi (Pak)

The Afghanistan national cricket team played a single One Day International (ODI) cricket match against the Pakistan national cricket team on 10 February 2012. The match took place at a time when Pakistan were due to play England in a follow-up ODI series in the UAE after defeating them 3–0 in a Test series.

Held at the Sharjah Cricket Association Stadium in the United Arab Emirates, it was the first time that the Pakistani cricket team had faced Afghanistan in a formal international-level cricket series. This was also Afghanistan's first time playing against a Test-playing nation and a Full Member of the International Cricket Council in an ODI, since achieving their own ODI status at the 2009 Cricket World Cup Qualifier.

Afghanistan batted first after winning the toss, posting a modest total of 195 after being bowled out in the 49th over. Pakistan reached their target comfortably by seven wickets with thirteen overs to spare. The match was seen as significant for Afghanistan, who had made rapid progress in international cricket over the preceding five years, as well as politically, with Afghanistan and Pakistan sharing a tense relationship between the neighboring countries.

== Background ==
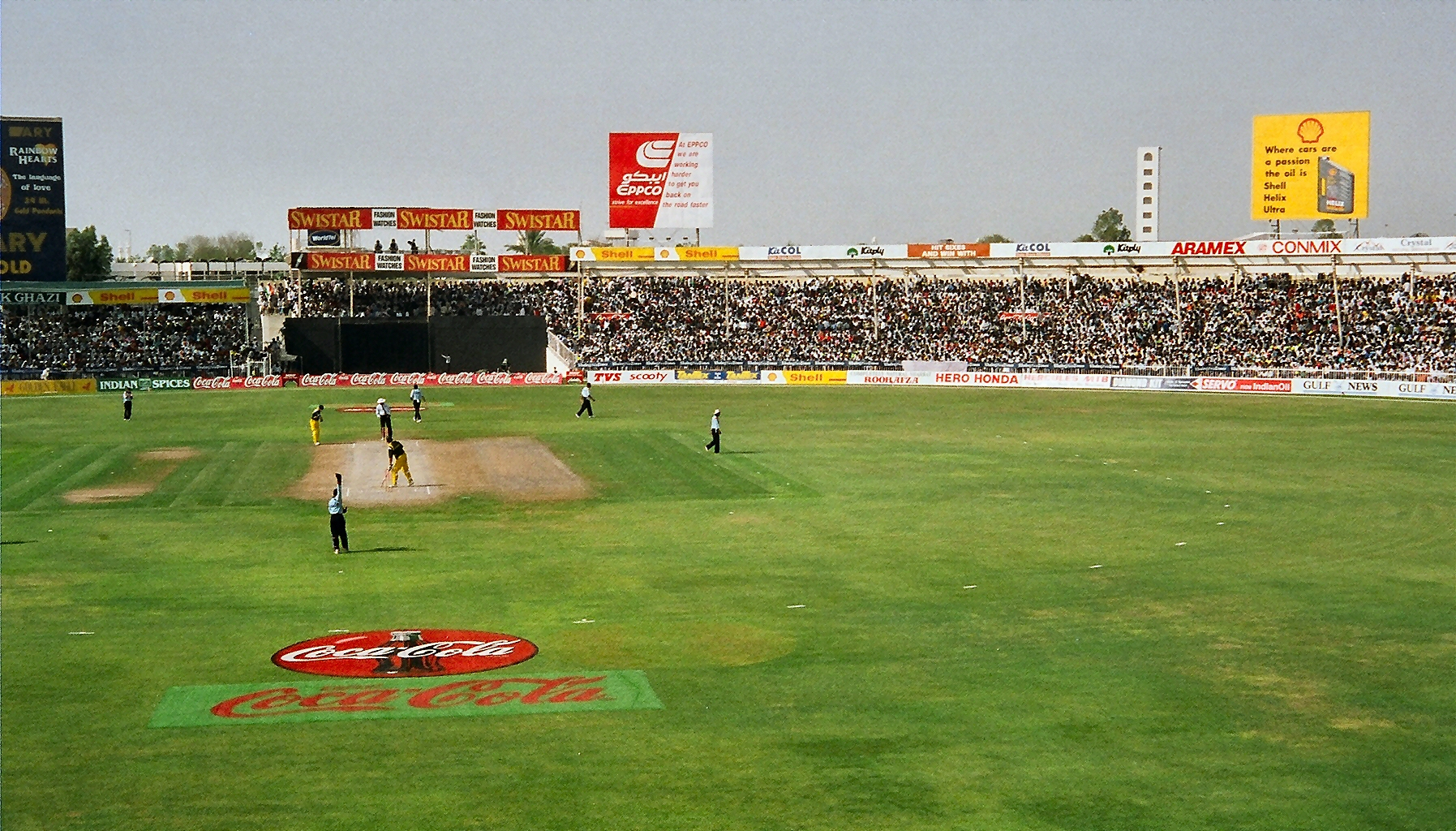
The Sharjah Cricket Association Stadium hosted the match.

An article published in the Indian Express described the match as one that would be one of cricket's "famous rivalries", noting the unstable and often tense political relations between the two neighboring countries as well as the complex historical, geographical and cultural links between Pakistan and Afghanistan. The Sharjah cricket stadium is famous for having previously hosted many cricket duels between arch-rivals India and Pakistan and the intense atmosphere surrounding this latest contest brings the ground back into the spotlight again. Many Afghan cricketers grew up and learnt cricket while living as refugees in Pakistan. Afghan fast bowler Hamid Hassan, who himself had been ruled out of the match through injury, said that the entire country was eagerly counting down to the big game with Pakistan, while all-rounder Mohammad Nabi added that the opportunity to play against a top team like Pakistan was a dream come true.

With the lack of international standard playing facilities and the ongoing security problems in Afghanistan, the Sharjah Cricket Association Stadium in Sharjah, United Arab Emirates has been Afghanistan's adopted 'home' ground since February 2010. Acknowledging the remarkable significance of the game for Afghan cricket, a local ground official expected the stadium to entertain a full house of spectators on the day, consisting especially of Afghan expatriates.

The only other occasion on which the Afghan cricket team has faced Pakistan at the world stage was at a semi-final of the 2010 Asian Games, a match which they went on to win. However, the Pakistani team at that tournament was a second-string domestic outfit and had almost no international players. This one-day international was hence the first occasion when Afghanistan was to compete against the proper Pakistani national team. The match was also significant for being the first time that an Affiliate Member of the International Cricket Council played a Full Member Test-playing nation.

Omar Zakhilwal, president of the Afghanistan Cricket Board, told reporters that cricket had become the most widely played game in Afghanistan and that the match was such a big milestone for the country that even the once cricket-hating Taliban had sent a message of support to the Afghan team.

== Squads ==
Pakistan	Afghanistan
Misbah-ul-Haq (c); Adnan Akmal (wk); Asad Shafiq; Hammad Azam; Junaid Khan; Saeed Ajmal; Shoaib Malik; Umar Gul; Younis Khan; Abdur Rehman; Aizaz Cheema; Azhar Ali; Imran Farhat; Mohammad Hafeez; Shahid Afridi; Umar Akmal; Wahab Riaz	Nawroz Mangal (c); Mohammad Shahzad (wk); Izatullah Dawlatzai; Karim Sadiq; Mohammad Nabi; Noor Ali Zadran; Shabir Noori; Dawlat Zadran; Amir Hamza; Javed Ahmadi; Mirwais Ashraf; Gulbodin Naib; Samiullah Shenwari; Shapoor Zadran

== Match ==
=== Report ===
==== Afghan innings ====
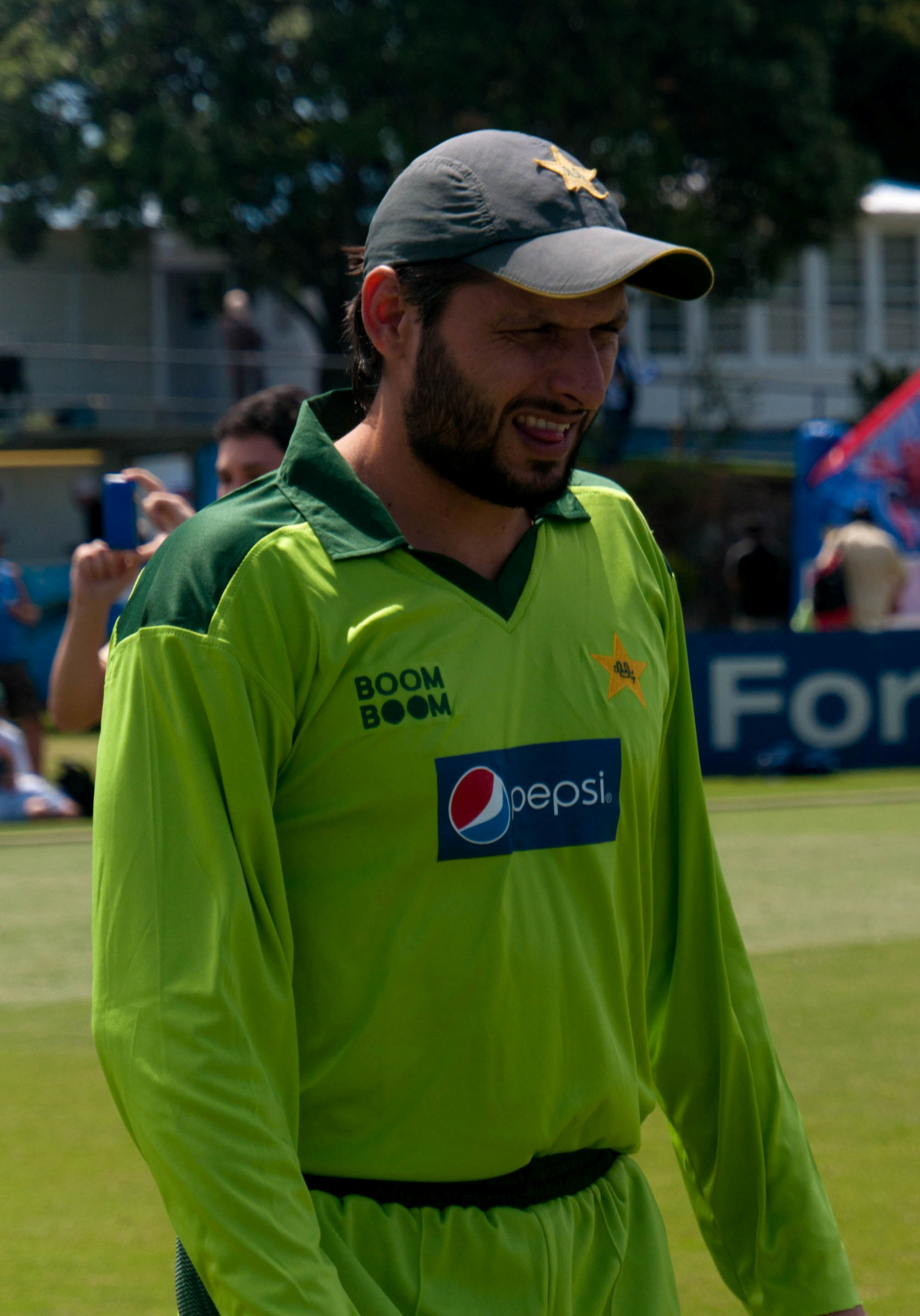
Shahid Afridi took figures of 5/36 to limit Afghanistan to 195.

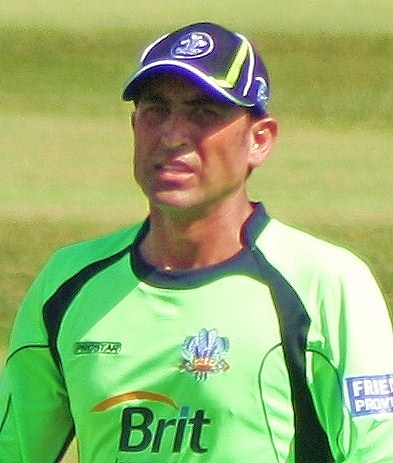
Younis Khan scored an unbeaten 70 guided Pakistan to a 7 wicket victory.

Under a cloudless late afternoon sky at Sharjah, full to capacity with 14,000 spectators, Afghanistan captain Nawroz Mangal won the toss and elected to bat on a wicket which favoured batting. The opening pair of Karim Sadiq and Noor Ali Zadran started brightly, with Sadiq scoring the first boundary of the innings from the fourth ball with a flick off Umar Gul. Zadran was dismissed midway through the fifth over, caught and bowled by Gul for 9. Wicket-keeper Mohammad Shahzad joined Sadiq at the crease and the two batted aggressively against the opening bowlers of Gul and Wahab Riaz. Sadiq recorded the first six of the match in the seventh over, striking a slower ball from Gul over the long on boundary. The following over Shahzad struck Riaz for three consecutive fours, which by the end of the eighth over took Afghanistan to 47, with a run rate close to 6 runs per over. This aggressive start by the Afghan batsman against the opening bowlers prompted Pakistani captain Misbah-ul-Haq to introduce spinner Saeed Ajmal early to the attack in the ninth over. The introduction of Ajmal, who had just come off the back of taking 24 wickets in Pakistans recently concluded Test series against England, didn't change the attacking mindset of Sadiq and Shahzad. The third delivery of Ajmal's first over was reverse swept for a six by Shahzad. The next over Shahid Afridi came into the attack and almost immediately dismissed Shahzad, thanks largely to a "moment of brilliance" in the field by Asad Shafiq, whose one-handed catch ended an entertaining stand of 31 for the second wicket. The introduction of Afridi to the attack lowered the run-rate considerably, with Afridi's variations of pace and spin leaving the Afghan batsman hesitant in their shot selection. At 71/2 in fourteenth over, Mangal mistimed a slog off Afridi, who bowled the Afghan captain for 11. He followed this up in the sixteenth by dismissing Sadiq to reduce them to 88/4. Gulbodin Naib became his fourth victim of the innings when he misread a googly and was adjudged leg before by umpire Simon Taufel. Mohammad Nabi and Samiullah Shenwari then combined to arrest the Afghan slump, through a measured but at times aggressive partnership. They added 46 runs for the sixth wicket to take the total to 147/4, however Nabi was run out for 32 from 56 balls by a combination of Khan and Mohammad Hafeez, after backing-up too far out of his crease with the score on 165. Mirwais Ashraf then became Afidi's fifth wicket of the match, while Dawlat Zadran and Shenwari took the score to 193. They soon fell and Afghanistan were all out for 195 from 48.3 overs. Karim Sadiq's 40 was the top score in the Afghan innings, while Afridi finished with figures with 5/36 from his ten overs. Gul and Riaz also chipped in with two wickets each, with Ajmal was the most economical bowler.

==== Pakistani innings ====
Set 196 to win under the floodlights, Pakistans innings started poorly when Hafeez was dismissed by Dawlat Zadran after edging back onto his stumps. Hafeez's opening partner Imran Farhat was then joined at the crease by Shafiq, with the two adding 33 for the second wicket. Shafiq fell for quickfire 20 from 21 balls in the tenth over to Dawlat Zadran, bowled by a "pacy indipper". The first ten overs, bowled entirely by Dawlat Zadran and his new ball partner Shapoor Zadran (of no relation), had conceded 42 runs, with the Pakistani run-rate at 4.20 runs per over. Spin was introduced in the eleventh, with the introduction of Ashraf. During the eleven overs that followed, no further wickets fell, while Pakistans run-rate remained around four runs per over, however by this point they only required a little over three runs per over. The spin of debutant Amir Hamza, Sadiq and Nabi, as well as the medium pace of Ashraf was used during this period of play, with the Pakistani batsman rotating the strike well and scoring the odd boundary. Farhat reached his fifty at the end of the twentieth over, though fell two overs later off the bowling of Shenwari for 52, having combined with Younis Khan to adding 57 for the third wicket, which took the score to 99/3. Khan was joined at the crease by Misbah-ul-Haq. Khan passed fifty at the end of the thirty-third over with a straight drive off Dawlat Zadran. Both batsman increased their scoring pace as they neared the target, with Misbah striking the winning runs with a reverse swept four off Nabi, to lead Pakistan home by seven wickets and with thirteen overs to spare. Khan and Misbah's unbeaten partnership was worth 99 from 93 balls, with Khan ending with 70 from 65 balls and Misbah ending with 40 runs from 55 balls. Dawlat Zadran, with figures of 2/38, was Afghanistan's most economical bowler.

During the presentation ceremony that followed immediately after match, Afridi was named man of the match for his five wickets. Afridi reached two notable landmarks during his performance: He surpassed Anil Kumble's tally of 337 wickets to become the second highest wicket taker in ODIs (behind Muttiah Muralitharan's 534), while his man of the match award was his 28th in ODIs, equally Saeed Anwar's record. Speaking after the match, Afghan captain Mangal stated that he thought Afghanistan were 40 runs short of an adequate total, while also commenting that he thought Afghanistan had performed satisfactorily, stating "This was our first-ever one-dayer against a top team and I am happy with the performance of the team". He also thanked the Pakistan Cricket Board for giving them the opportunity to play Pakistan and requested the International Cricket Council to provide them with more matches against Full Members. Misbah, also commenting during the presentation ceremony in which he accepted the victors trophy, stated, "I am really happy with the spirit of the Afghanistan players," expanding on that by commenting, "There were times in the match when they put us on the back foot and that was expected, so we did well to win in the end."

=== Summary ===
10 February
Scorecard

Afghanistan; 195 (48.3 overs)	v	Pakistan; 198/3 (37.1 overs)
Karim Sadiq 40 (47); Shahid Afridi 5/36 (10 overs)		Younis Khan 70* (65); Dawlat Zadran 2/38 (9 overs)

Pakistan won by 7 wickets
Sharjah Cricket Association Stadium, Sharjah
Umpires: Shozab Raza (Pak) and Simon Taufel (Aus)
Player of the match: Shahid Afridi (Pak)

- Afghanistan won the toss and elected to bat.

=== Full scorecard ===
Afghanistan batting innings
Batsman	Method of dismissal	Runs	Balls	Strike-rate
Karim Sadiq	c U Akmal b Afridi	40	47	85.11
Noor Ali Zadran	c and b Gul	9	8	112.50
Mohammad Shahzad †	c Shafiq b Afridi	20	17	117.65
Nawroz Mangal *	b Afridi	11	17	64.71
Mohammad Nabi	run out (Y. Khan → Hafeez)	37	56	66.07
Gulbudeen Naib	lbw Afridi	7	23	30.43
Samiullah Shenwari	lbw Gul	32	68	47.06
Mirwais Ashraf	lbw Afridi	12	27	44.44
Dawlat Zadran	b Riaz	12	19	63.16
Amir Hamza	c U Akmal b Riaz	0	6	0.00
Shapoor Zadran	not out	2	3	66.67
Extras	(4 byes, 5 leg-byes, 4 wides)	13		
Totals	(48.3 overs)	195 all out		

Pakistan bowling
Bowler	Overs	Maidens	Runs	Wickets	Economy
Umar Gul	8	0	32	2	3.75
Wahab Riaz	9.3	1	37	2	3.89
Saeed Ajmal	10	1	32	0	3.20
Shahid Afridi	10	0	36	5	3.60
Mohammad Hafeez	7	1	28	0	4.00
Shoaib Malik	4	0	23	0	5.75

Pakistan batting innings
Batsman	Method of dismissal	Runs	Balls	Strike-rate
Mohammad Hafeez	b D. Zadran	8	17	47.06
Imran Farhat	c and b Shenwari	52	67	77.61
Asad Shafiq	lbw D. Zadran	20	21	95.24
Younis Khan	not out	70	65	107.69
Misbah-ul-Haq *	not out	40	55	72.73
Shahid Afridi	did not bat	–	–	–
Umar Akmal †	did not bat	–	–	–
Shoaib Malik	did not bat	–	–	–
Saeed Ajmal	did not bat	–	–	–
Umar Gul	did not bat	–	–	–
Wahab Riaz	did not bat	–	–	–
Extras	(1 leg-bye, 2 no-balls, 5 wides)	8		
Totals	(37.1 overs)	198/3		

Afghanistan bowling
Bowler	Overs	Maidens	Runs	Wickets	Economy
Shapoor Zadran	8	1	49	0	6.12
Dawlat Zadran	9	2	38	2	4.22
Mirwais Ashraf	5	0	27	0	5.40
Karim Sadiq	2	0	10	0	5.00
Amir Hamza	4	0	22	0	5.50
Mohammad Nabi	5.1	0	29	0	5.61
Samiullah Shenwari	4	0	22	1	5.50
