= Muhammad Akbar Raisani =

Pakistani footballer

Akbar Raisani
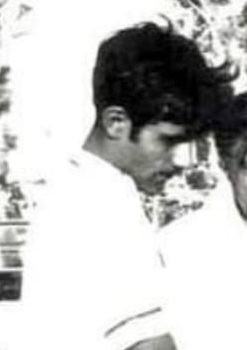
- Akbar in 1973

Personal information
- Full name: Muhammad Akbar Raisani
- Date of birth: 1953 (age 72–73)
- Place of birth: Quetta, Pakistan
- Position: Defender

Youth career
- Baloch Quetta

Senior career*
Years	Team	Apps	(Gls)
–1977	Ordnance Depot Quetta		
1977–1982	National Bank		

International career
1976–1982	Pakistan		
- * Club domestic league appearances and goals

Muhammad Akbar Raisani (Urdu: محمد اکبر رئیسانی; born 1953) is a Pakistani former footballer who played as a defender. Akbar is among the major players of the Pakistan national football team in the 1980s, and served as captain of the national side in 1981–82.

== Early life ==
Akbar was born in 1953 in Quetta, capital of the Balochistan province of Pakistan.

== Club career ==
Akbar started his career with Baloch Quetta, and later joined departmental side Ordnance Depot Quetta.

In 1972, Akbar featured in the National Youth Football Championship. In 1977, he joined National Football Championship departmental side National Bank.

== International career ==
Akbar was first selected for Pakistan in 1976 and played in the Afghanistan Republic Day Festival Cup and the 1976 Quaid-e-Azam International Tournament the same year.

In 1981, after the team did a goodwill tour to Burma, Akbar served as captain of the Pakistan national team at the 1981 King's Cup in Thailand. Under his captaincy, the team achieved victories over Malaysia and Singapore, a draw against Indonesia, and a defeat against Thailand during the tournament.

He also served as captain at the 1982 Quaid-e-Azam International Tournament held in Karachi with the Pakistan national team, where he featured in all the matches as starter.

== Post-retirement ==
From 2001 till 2003, Akbar was chief selector of Balochistan province and part of the Pakistan Football Federation selection committee.

In March 2020, Akbar was selected as secretary of the Balochistan Football Association by the normalisation committee in charge of the Pakistan Football Federation installed by FIFA.

== See also ==
- List of Pakistan national football team captains
