= Ahmad Shah Lali =

Afghan footballer

Personal information
- Full name: Ahmad Shah Rahim Lali
- Date of birth: 1953
- Place of birth: Kabul, Afghanistan
- Date of death: 30 December 2021 (aged 68)
- Place of death: Germany
- Position: Forward

Senior career*
Years	Team	Apps	(Gls)
- Bamika
- Hindukush Kabul
- Alemannia Aachen

International career
1970s	Afghanistan		
- * Club domestic league appearances and goals

Ahmad Shah Rahim Lali (Persian: احمد شاه رحیم لعلی; 1953 – 30 December 2021) was an Afghan footballer who played as a forward. Shah is regarded as one of the most prominent players of the Afghanistan national team in the 1970s.

== Club career ==
Shah represented several clubs at domestic level including Bamika and Hindukush Kabul.

== International career ==
Shah represented the Afghanistan national team in the 1970s. At the 1976 Quaid-e-Azam International Tournament, he scored a goal against Guangdong in a 2–6 defeat.

== Personal life and death ==
After leaving Afghanistan and emigrating to Germany, he spent some time playing for Alemannia Aachen, which at that time competed in the second tier of German football. He later emigrated to the United States. His younger cousin Ali Askar Lali also represented the Afghanistan national team.

Shah died in Germany on 30 December 2021. His death was condoled by the Afghanistan Football Federation.
