= Mohsen Yousefi =

Mohsen Yousefi may refer to:

- Mohsen Yousefi (footballer, born 1984), Iranian footballer
- Mohsen Yousefi (footballer, born 1954), Iranian footballer
