= Ghulam Sarwar Sr. =

Pakistani footballer (1953–2024)

Ghulam Sarwar
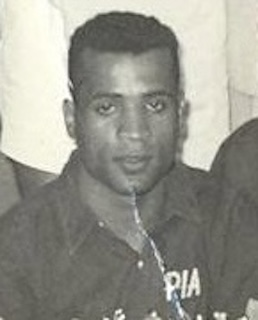
- Sarwar with Pakistan Airlines in 1971

Personal information
- Full name: Ghulam Sarwar Baloch
- Date of birth: 1953
- Place of birth: Lyari, Karachi, Pakistan
- Date of death: 10 October 2024 (aged 70–71)
- Place of death: Karachi, Pakistan
- Position: Forward

Youth career
- Baghdad Sports

Senior career*
Years	Team	Apps	(Gls)
1969	Sindh Government Press		
1969	KMC		
1969–1970	Karachi Port Trust		
1970–1985	Pakistan Airlines		
1975–1976	Emirates		

International career
1970–1978	Pakistan		
- * Club domestic league appearances and goals

Ghulam Sarwar Baloch (Urdu: غلام سرور بلوچ; 1953 – 10 October 2024). commonly known as Ghulam Sarwar Sr., was a Pakistani footballer who played as a forward. Sarwar played for the Pakistan national team in the 1970s, and captained the national team on several occasions.

== Club career ==
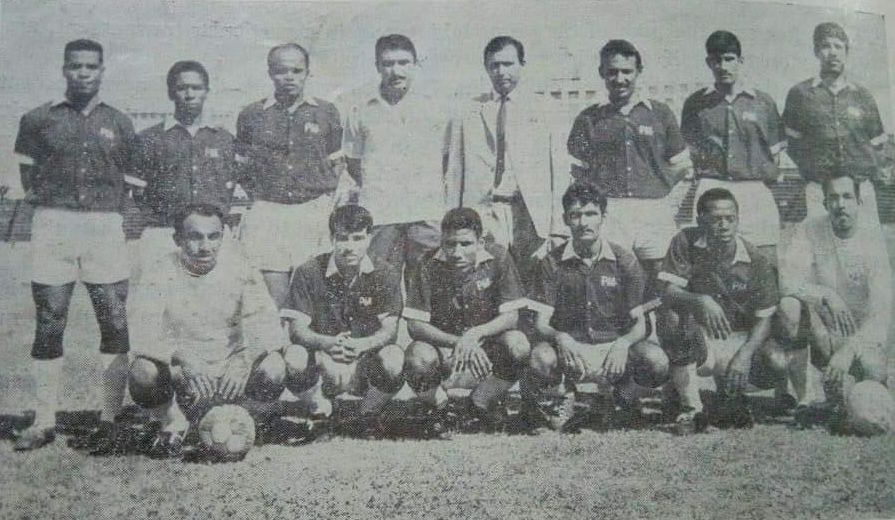
Sarwar standing at far left with Pakistan Airlines in 1970

Hailing from Lyari, Sarwar rose through the ranks from school football.

In 1969, Sarwar played for departmental sides Sindh Government Press and KMC. The same year he joined Karachi Port Trust. He represented Karachi Port Trust at the 1969 Aga Khan Gold Cup. In May 1967, he won the Governor's Gold Cup with the team, defeating Sindh Government Press in the final. In April 1970, he played at the Services Cup. He also represented Karachi Division at the National Football Championship.

In 1970, he joined Pakistan Airlines. At the 1977–78 Aga Khan Gold Cup, Sarwar scored the lone goal for PIA in the victory against Abahani Krira Chakra. After the tournament, Sarwar was reportedly offered to play for Abahani, but the transfer seemingly failed to materialise.

During the 1970s, several local leagues were launched across the Middle East, where several Pakistani players represented club sides in these leagues and some of these players even coached the clubs’ new youth setups. Subsequently, Sarwar moved to the United Arab Emirates, where he featured for Emirates Club in the mid-1970s. He played for the Abu Dhabi based club alongside national teammate Ali Nawaz Baloch at the top-tier UAE Football League. Both also played for Pakistan Airlines simultaneously.

== International career ==
Sarwar made his senior international debut with Pakistan which competed under the name of Pakistan Football Federation XI for the 1970 Friendship Cup, and later participated in the 1970 RCD Cup, both held in Iran.

In 1973, he toured China, Hong Kong and North Korea with the national team, and the next year he played at the 1974 RCD Cup and the 1974 Asian Games.

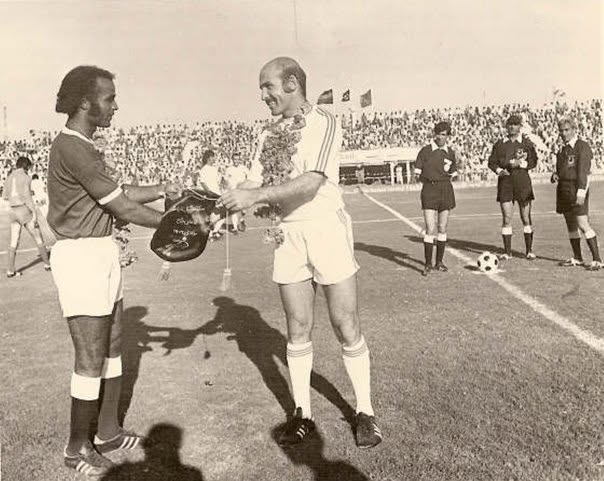
Sarwar (left), and Afghanistan captain Rahmatullah Ahmadzai (right) before match at the 1976 Quaid-e-Azam International Tournament

When Mohammad Daoud Khan was ruling Afghanistan in the 1970s, Sarwar participated twice in the Afghanistan Republic Day Festival Cup, with the Pakistan national team in 1976 and with a national selection called Shaheen XI in 1977, captaining in both editions. He also served as captain at the 1976 Quaid-e-Azam International Tournament.

In 1978, Sarwar featured for the national team for their participation in the Saudi Arabia Football Federation International Tournament.

== Post-retirement ==
Sarwar's younger brother Muhammad Saleem also played as footballer for PIA, and represented the Pakistan national team in the 1980s. Sarwar retired from the Pakistan Airlines department in 1998.

On 6 May 2014, The News International reported the unfortunate conditions of Sarwar at the age of 60. The amount of money he gathered after his retirement had been spent on his family. Since retirement, he had been receiving only 7000 PKR per month as pension. Apart from supporting his own family, the amount was insufficient to look after the families of his two brothers, who had died earlier. Adding to the earlier issues, his four sons were also jobless. Financial problems forced him to work with the Sindh Sports Board as a coach on a meagre monthly salary of 7000 PKR per month. He was also expecting a grant from the Sindh government which could help him to minimise his hardships.

== Death ==
Sarwar died on 10 October 2024.

== Career statistics ==
=== International goals ===
Scores and results list Pakistan's goal tally first, score column indicates score after each Sarwar goal.

List of international goals scored by Ghulam Sarwar
No.	Date	Venue	Opponent	Score	Result	Competition	Ref.
1	18 January 1974	Hockey Stadium, Karachi, Pakistan	Turkey	1–1	2–2	1974 RCD Cup	
2	5 September 1974	Amjadieh Stadium, Tehran, Iran	Bahrain	2–0	5–1	1974 Asian Games	
3	5 September 1974	Amjadieh Stadium, Tehran, Iran	Bahrain	5–1	5–1	1974 Asian Games	

== See also ==
- List of Pakistan national football team captains
