= Ali Asghar (footballer) =

Pakistani footballer (1950 – 2001)

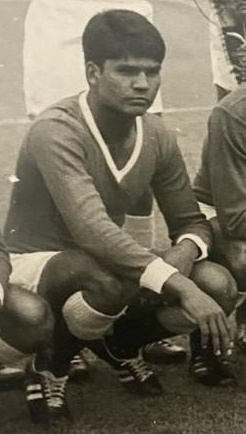
- Asghar with Pakistan youth team at the 1973 AFC Youth Championship

Personal information
- Date of birth: 1950
- Place of birth: Lahore, Pakistan
- Date of death: 4 January 2001 (aged 50–51)
- Place of death: Lahore, Pakistan
- Position: Midfielder

Youth career
- Al-Fatah FC Lahore

Senior career*
Years	Team	Apps	(Gls)
1969–1974	WAPDA		
1975–??	Pakistan Airlines		

International career
1973	Pakistan Youth		
1973–1978	Pakistan		
- * Club domestic league appearances and goals

Ali Asghar (Urdu: علی اصغر; 1950 – 4 January 2001) also known as Asghar Tony, was a Pakistani footballer who played as a midfielder. Asghar played for the Pakistan national football team in the 1970s, and played for Pakistan Airlines for the major part of his domestic career.

== Early life ==
Asghar was born in 1950 in Lahore, Pakistan. He started playing football from an early age as a right winger from Al-Fatah Football Club of Lahore. Later, he also played for Sir Amin Academy in Karachi. Asghar received his initial coaching from his father, Ghulam Muhammad Jr., a former domestic-level footballer in Pakistan, as well as from Ghulam Muhammad Sr., a former Pakistan international footballer.

== Club career ==
Asghar was associated with departmental side WAPDA, and also represented National Football Championship selection Lahore Division.

He later became a part of the Pakistan Airlines football team, for which he was associated with the organisation for the rest of his life. In his first match for PIA, he scored 6 goals against WAPDA, while in the 1975 National Football Championship held in Multan, Asghar scored 14 goals and was declared the top scorer for Pakistan Airlines, playing a crucial role to win the third club's title. He scored a goal against a Chinese team in 1975. On 9 March 1978, Asghar also played with Pakistan Airlines against the Berlin University football team from Germany at the KMC Stadium.

== International career ==
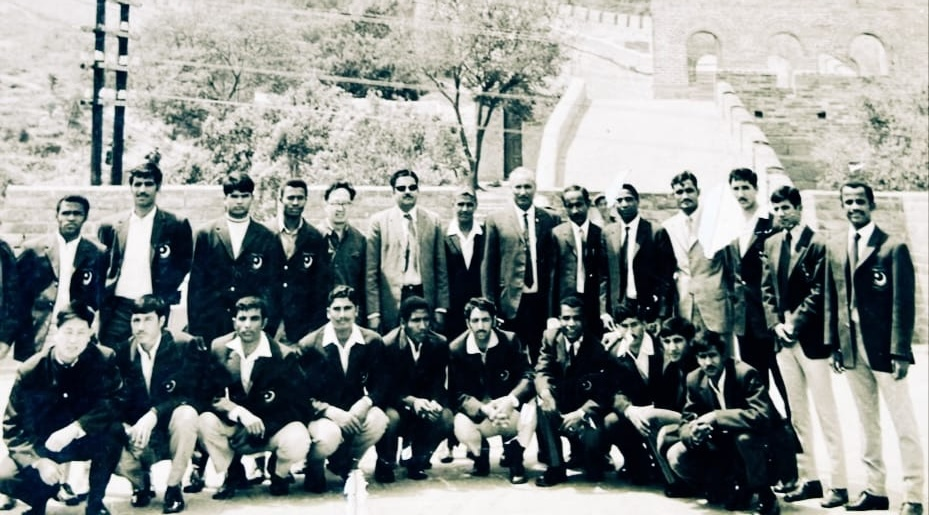
Pakistan national team visiting the Great Wall of China in 1973. Asghar standing third from left to right

In 1970, Asghar was first selected for the Pakistan national team which competed under the name of PFF XI at the 1970 Jaam-e-Doosti Cup (Friendship Cup) in Iran. He also represented the Pakistan youth team at the 1973 AFC Youth Championship in Iran. The same year, he toured China with the senior team where the national side played friendlies against local sides including a match against China. The next year, Asghar was part of the squad during the 1974 Asian Games, featuring in several matches.

He also participated at the Afghanistan Republic Day Festival Cup with the national team. He was also part of the Pakistan national team for the Saudi Arabia Football Federation International Tournament in 1978.

== Personal life ==
Asghar came from a family of footballers. Asghar was eldest of ten siblings, and three of his brothers also represented the Pakistan national team. His younger brother Ghulam Sarwar Teddy captained the gold winning national team at the 1991 South Asian Games in Sri Lanka.

== Death ==
Asghar died on 4 January 2001 in a traffic collision. At 10:30 in the night, Asghar was returning home on a motorcycle after performing his duty in Pakistan Airlines in Lahore when a speeding motorcycle coming from behind hit him near the railway gate in Mughalpura, Lahore, due to which he lost his life after a ten-day struggle in hospital.

== Honours ==
=== Pakistan Airlines ===
- National Football Championship (?):
