= 1974 RCD Cup =

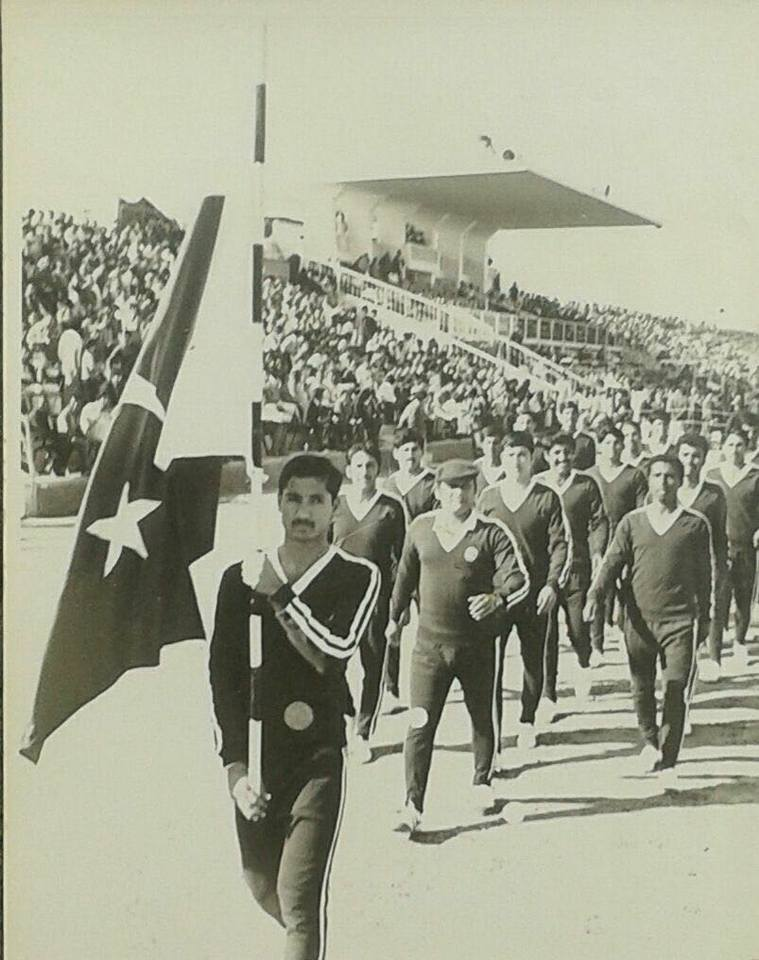
- Inauguration of the 1974 RCD Cup at the Hockey Club Stadium, Karachi

Tournament details
- Country: Pakistan
- Venue(s): Hockey Stadium, Karachi
- Dates: 17 January – 20 January
- Teams: 3

Final positions
- Champions: Turkey (3rd title)
- Runners-up: Iran
- Third place: Pakistan

Tournament statistics
- Matches played: 3
- Goals scored: 8 (2.67 per match)
- Attendance: 5,000 (1,667 per match)

The 1974 RCD Cup was the fifth edition of the RCD Cup. The event was held at the Hockey Club Stadium in Karachi, Pakistan.

== Overview ==
This was the fifth edition of the RCD Cup, and the second to be held in Pakistan. Three nation tournament played in league format between Pakistan, Turkey, and Iran. Following the Iranian club Malavan's fifth-place finish in the inaugural 1973–74 Takht Jamshid Cup, where it was the highest-placed club from outside Tehran, the Iranian Football Federation selected the Malavan squad to represent Iran at the 1974 RCD Cup, in recognition of the club's performance during its debut national league campaign. The team was managed officially by Iran national coach Danny McLennan, with Bahman Salehnia serving as captain and player.

== Venue ==
Karachi	1974 RCD Cup is located in Pakistan
Hockey Stadium	1974 RCD Cup is located in Pakistan
Capacity: 30,000	1974 RCD Cup is located in Pakistan

== Results ==
Pos	Team	Pld	W	D	L	GF	GA	GD	Pts	Final result
1	Turkey	2	1	1	0	3	2	+1	3	Champions
2	Iran	2	1	0	1	2	2	0	2	
3	Pakistan	2	0	1	1	3	4	−1	1	

Source: RSSSF

== Matches ==
17 January 1974

Iran	2–1	Pakistan
Jahani 28'; Espandar 73'	Report	Idrees 19'

Hockey Club Stadium, Karachi
Attendance: 5,000
Referee: Ziya Türkdogan (Turkey)

18 January 1974

Pakistan	2–2 (Note: Pakistani sources, including Dawn, credit Ali Nawaz Baloch with Pakistan's second goal assisted by Muhammad Idrees, and Müjdat Yalman with Turkey's second goal. Turkish sources instead credit Muhammad Idrees and Melih Atacan, respectively.)	Turkey
Sarwar 45' (pen.); Nawaz 85'	Report	Atacan 8'; Yalman 49'

Hockey Club Stadium, Karachi
Referee: Mohsen Zamani (Iran)

20 January 1974

Iran	0–1	Turkey
	Report	Alayoğlu 85'

Hockey Club Stadium, Karachi
Referee: Yaqoob Ahmed (Pakistan)

== Top scorers ==
1 goal

- (Turkey) Melih Atacan
- (Turkey) Sinan Alayoğlu
- (Turkey) Müjdat Yalman
- (Iran) Ghafour Jahani
- (Iran) Aziz Espandar
- (Pakistan) Muhammad Idrees
- (Pakistan) Ghulam Sarwar
- (Pakistan) Ali Nawaz Baloch

== Squads ==
=== Iran ===
Head coach: (Scotland) Danny McLennan

No.	Pos.	Player	Date of birth (age)	Caps	Club
	GK	Ali Sayyad	1946 (aged 28)		(Iran) Malavan
	DF	Qader Ezatollahi			(Iran) Malavan
	DF	Bahman Salehnia (c)	11 March 1939 (aged 34)		(Iran) Malavan
	DF	Majid Janani			(Iran) Malavan
	DF	Farhad Sayyad-Mosleh			(Iran) Malavan
	DF	Manouchehr Navaran	1945 (aged 29)		(Iran) Malavan
	MF	Mohammad Reza Vishgahi			(Iran) Malavan
	MF	Qasem Soltanzadi	1954 (aged 20)		(Iran) Malavan
	MF	Nosrat Irandoost	1 May 1949 (aged 24)		(Iran) Malavan
	MF	Javid Jahangiri	1939 (aged 35)		(Iran) Malavan
	FW	Ghafour Jahani	19 June 1951 (aged 22)		(Iran) Malavan
	FW	Aziz Espandar	2 February 1948 (aged 25)		(Iran) Malavan
	FW	Ali Niakani	8 January 1951 (aged 23)		(Iran) Malavan
		Mohammad Sharifi			(Iran) Malavan
		Hossien Kamyab			(Iran) Malavan
		Reza Raffat			(Iran) Malavan
		Khedmat Naurizadeh			(Iran) Malavan
		Karim Samadi			(Iran) Malavan

=== Pakistan ===
Head coach: (India) Mohammed Rahmatullah

No.	Pos.	Player	Date of birth (age)	Caps	Goals	Club
	GK	Afzal Hussain				(Pakistan Football Federation) Pakistan Airlines
	GK	Muhammad Iqbal				(Pakistan Football Federation) Karachi Division
	DF	Amir Bakhsh				(Pakistan Football Federation) Karachi Division
	DF	Ali Muhammad				(Pakistan Football Federation) Pakistan Airlines
	DF	Mujahid Tareen	11 August 1949 (aged 25)			(Pakistan Football Federation) Pakistan Army
	DF	Wali Muhammad				(Pakistan Football Federation) Rawalpindi Division
	DF	Ghulam Akbar				(Pakistan Football Federation) Pakistan Airlines
	DF	Miskeen				(Pakistan Football Federation) Pakistan Army
	DF	Ashok Kumar				(Pakistan Football Federation) Khairpur Division
	MF	Muhammad Sharif				(Pakistan Football Federation) Pakistan Airlines
	MF	Ali Asghar	1950 (aged 24)			(Pakistan Football Federation) Lahore Division
	MF	Qadir Bakhsh	10 October 1947 (aged 26)			(Pakistan Football Federation) Lahore Division
	MF	Muhammad Nazir				(Pakistan Football Federation) Peshawar Division
	MF	Muhammad Yousuf				(Pakistan Football Federation) Rawalpindi Division
	MF	Rasool Bakhsh				(Pakistan Football Federation) Rawalpindi Division
	FW	Ayub Dar (c)	5 December 1947 (aged 26)			(Pakistan Football Federation) Pakistan Western Raiway
	FW	Ali Nawaz Baloch	3 July 1949 (aged 25)			(Pakistan Football Federation) Pakistan Airlines
	FW	Muhammad Idrees				(Pakistan Football Federation) Pakistan Western Railway
	FW	Ghulam Sarwar	1953 (aged 21)			(Pakistan Football Federation) Pakistan Airlines
	FW	Taj Muhammad				(Pakistan Football Federation) Karachi Division
	FW	Ewaz Ali				(Pakistan Football Federation) Quetta Division
	FW	Afzal Qasim				(Pakistan Football Federation) Karachi Division
	FW	Abdul Ghafoor Ajiz				(Pakistan Football Federation) Peshawar Division

=== Turkey ===
Head coach: (Turkey) Coskun Özari

No.	Pos.	Player	Date of birth (age)	Caps	Club
1	GK	Sabri Dino	1 January 1942 (aged 32)		(Turkey) Beşiktaş J.K.
2	DF	Ekrem Günalp	20 September 1949 (aged 24)		(Turkey) Galatasaray
3	DF	Tuncay Temeller	20 November 1951 (aged 22)		(Turkey) Galatasaray
4	DF	İsmail Arca (c)	5 September 1948 (aged 25)		(Turkey) Eskisehirspor
5	DF	Müjdat Yalman	14 August 1949 (aged 24)		(Turkey) Ankaragücü
6	MF	Köksal Mesci	1 November 1945 (aged 28)		(Turkey) Adanaspor
7	MF	Bülent Ünder	16 January 1942 (aged 32)		(Turkey) Galatasaray
8	MF	Ahmet Börtücene	5 October 1950 (aged 23)		(Turkey) Beşiktaş J.K.
9	FW	Melih Atacan	3 September 1953 (aged 20)		(Turkey) Ankaragücü
10	FW	Sinan Alayoğlu	14 December 1949 (aged 24)		(Turkey) Boluspor
11	FW	Tuğrul Şener	19 May 1949 (aged 24)		(Turkey) Beşiktaş J.K.
12	GK	Yasin Özdenak	11 October 1948 (aged 25)		(Turkey) Galatasaray
13	MF	Ömer Kaner	21 May 1951 (aged 22)		(Turkey) Eskisehirspor
14	DF	Nikos Kovis	6 January 1953 (aged 21)		(Turkey) Beşiktaş J.K.
15	FW	Mehmet Türkkan	30 March 1948 (aged 25)		(Turkey) Göztepe A.Ş.
16	FW	Doğan Küçükduru	16 September 1954 (aged 19)		(Turkey) Göztepe A.Ş.
