= Rahmatullah Ahmadzai =

Afghan footballer

- Ahmadzai during the 1976 Quaid-e-Azam International Tournament

Personal information
- Date of birth: 22 November 1949 (age 76)
- Place of birth: Kabul, Afghanistan
- Position: Defender

Senior career*
Years	Team	Apps	(Gls)
- Bamika
- Hindukush Kabul

International career
1970s	Afghanistan		
- * Club domestic league appearances and goals

Rahmatullah Ahmadzai (Pashto: رحمت الله احمدزی; born 22 November 1949), also known as Rahmat Ahmadzai, is an Afghan former footballer who played as a defender. Rahmatullah represented the Afghanistan national team in the 1970s, and also served as captain.

== Club career ==
Ahmadzai represented several clubs at domestic level including Bamika and Hindukush Kabul.

== International career ==
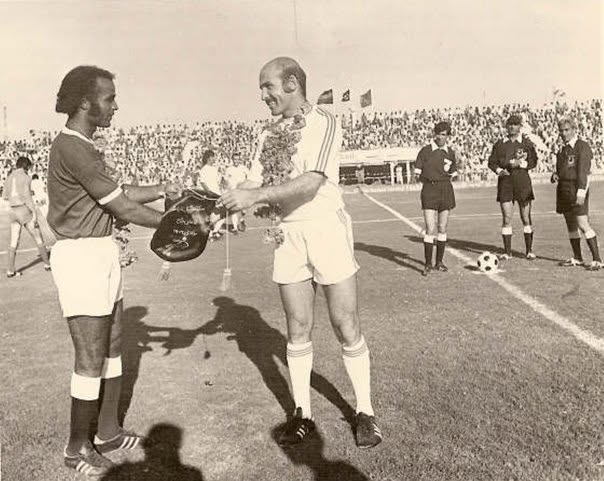
Ahmadzai (right), and Pakistan captain Ghulam Sarwar (left) before match at the 1976 Quaid-e-Azam International Tournament

Ahmadzai represented the Afghanistan national team in the 1970s. He served as captain during the 1976 Quaid-e-Azam International Tournament. The next year, he also served as captain at the Afghanistan Republic Day Festival Cup.
