= Yoshiharu Horii =

Japanese footballer and manager (1953–2025)

Yoshiharu Horii 堀井 美晴
Personal information
- Date of birth: 16 March 1953
- Place of birth: Fujieda, Shizuoka, Japan
- Date of death: 23 August 2025 (aged 72)
- Height: 1.73 m (5 ft 8 in)
- Position: Forward

Youth career
- 1968–1970: Fujieda Higashi High School

Senior career*
Years	Team	Apps	(Gls)
1971–1987	Yanmar Diesel	204	(46)
Total		204	(46)

Managerial career
- 2001: Kawasaki Frontale
Medal record
Yanmar Diesel
Winner	Japan Soccer League	1971
Winner	Japan Soccer League	1974
Winner	Japan Soccer League	1975
Winner	Japan Soccer League	1980
Runner-up	Japan Soccer League	1972
Runner-up	Japan Soccer League	1978
Winner	JSL Cup	1983
Winner	JSL Cup	1984
Runner-up	JSL Cup	1977
Runner-up	JSL Cup	1982
Winner	Emperor's Cup	1974
Runner-up	Emperor's Cup	1971
Runner-up	Emperor's Cup	1972
Runner-up	Emperor's Cup	1976
Runner-up	Emperor's Cup	1977
Runner-up	Emperor's Cup	1983
Representing Japan
AFC U-19 Championship
Silver medal – second place	1973 Iran
- * Club domestic league appearances and goals

Yoshiharu Horii (堀井 美晴, Horii Yoshiharu; 16 March 1953 – 23 August 2025) was a Japanese football player and manager.

== Playing career ==
Horii was born in Fujieda on 16 March 1953. After graduating from high school, he played for Yanmar Diesel from 1971 to 1987. He played 204 games and scored 46 goals.

== Coaching career ==
After retirement, Horii became a coach at Yanmar Diesel (later Cerezo Osaka) until 1995. In 1996, he moved to Gamba Osaka and coached until 2000. In 2001, he became a manager for Kawasaki Frontale.

== Death ==
Horii died on 23 August 2025, at the age of 72.

== Managerial statistics ==
Team	From	To	Record				
Team	From	To	G	W	D	L	Win %
Kawasaki Frontale	2001	2001	20	8	2	10	40.00
Total			20	8	2	10	40.00
