= Afzal Qasim =

Pakistani former footballer

Personal information
- Full name: Afzal Qasim
- Date of birth: Unknown
- Place of birth: Karachi, Pakistan
- Position: Striker

Senior career*
Years	Team	Apps	(Gls)
??–1976	KMC		
1977–??	Pakistan Airlines		

International career
1973	Pakistan Youth		(1)
1974–1976	Pakistan		(1)
- * Club domestic league appearances and goals

Afzal Qasim was a Pakistani footballer who played as a forward. He represented the Pakistan national team in the 1970s.

== Club career ==
Qasim first played for Karachi based departmental side KMC, and also represented the Karachi Division at the National Football Championship. He then joined Pakistan Airlines in 1977, playing for them throughout the 1970s, helping them win several titles. He notably scored in the 1978 National Football Championship final against Sindh Red. He also participated at the 1977–78 and 1981–82 editions of the Aga Khan Gold Cup with PIA, notably scoring against Brothers Union to enable a 1–1 draw in the 1977–78 edition.

== International career ==
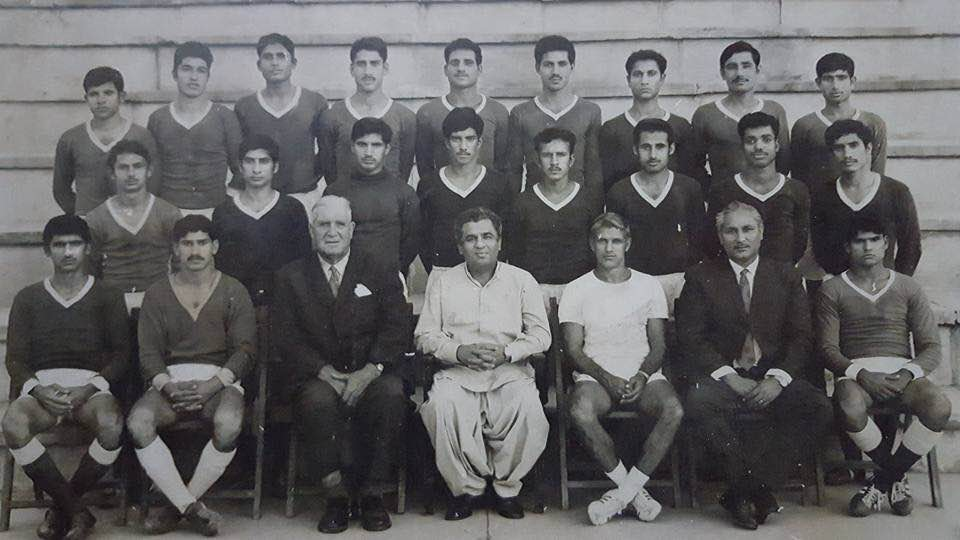
Qasim standing second from extreme right (middle row), with Pakistan Youth in 1973.

In 1973, Qasim participated in the 1973 AFC Youth Championship held in Iran with the Pakistan Youth team. In the tournament, Qasim managed to score against Saudi Arabia in a 1–2 loss.

The following year, Qasim would get selected to represent the Pakistan senior team at the 1974 RCD Cup as a substitute. Qasim was also included in the national team for the 1974 Asian Games later that year.

In 1976, Qasim represented the Pakistan Greens team at the 1976 Quaid-e-Azam International Tournament, where he would score the winning goal at the 8th minute against Afghanistan which enabled the team to get a 1–0 win. He was also included in the starting line-up for the next match against Guangdong XI.

== Career statistics ==
=== International goals ===
Scores and results list Pakistan's goal tally first, score column indicates score after each Qasim goal.

List of international goals scored by Afzal Qasim
No.	Date	Venue	Opponent	Score	Result	Competition	Ref.
1	12 October 1976	Hockey Stadium, Karachi, Pakistan	Afghanistan	1–0	1–0	1976 Quaid-e-Azam International Tournament	
