= Abdul Haq (footballer) =

Pakistani former footballer

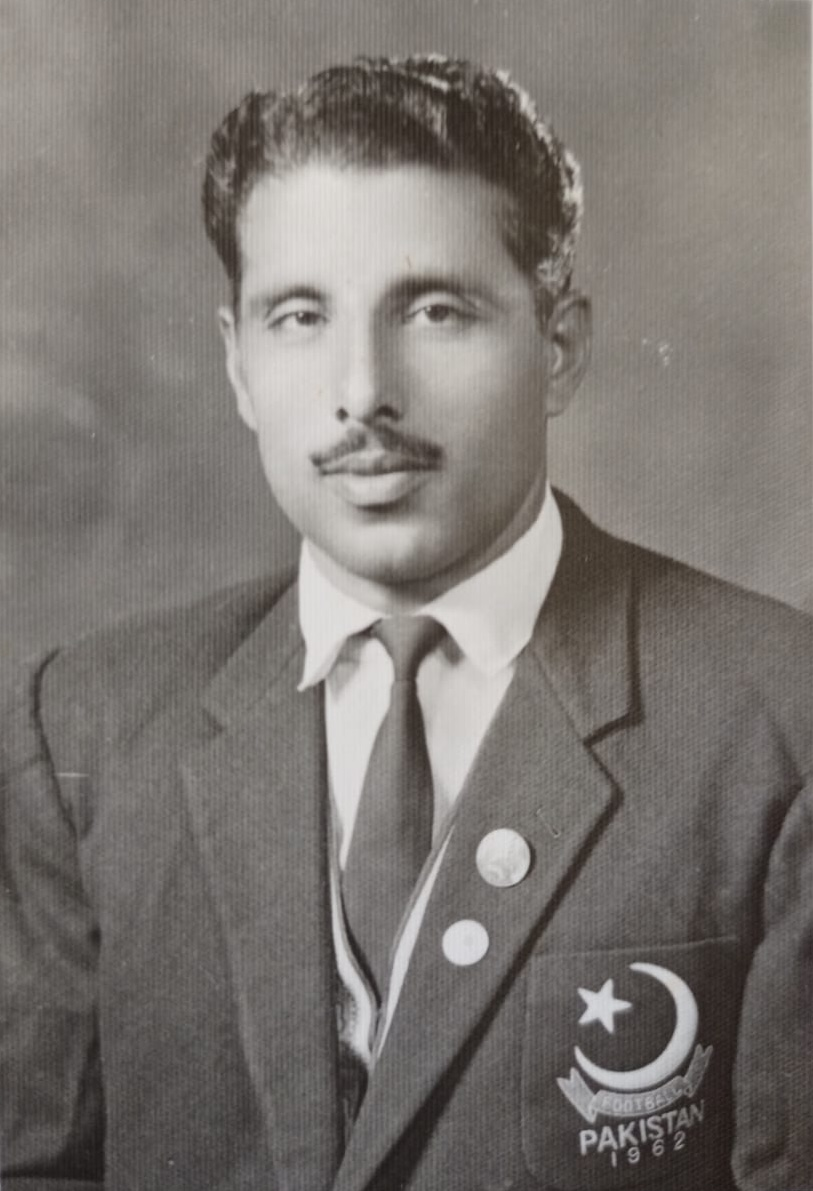
- Abdul Haq in 1962

Personal information
- Full name: Chaudhry Abdul Haq Gujjar
- Date of birth: Unknown
- Place of birth: Punjab, British India
- Date of death: Unknown
- Position: Defender

Youth career
- 1952–1953: Punjab University

Senior career*
Years	Team	Apps	(Gls)
1955	East Bengal		
1956–??	Pakistan Western Railway		

International career
1953–1963	Pakistan		
- * Club domestic league appearances and goals

Abdul Haq was a Pakistani footballer who played as a defender. He played for Pakistan Railways and Punjab throughout his career, and is one of the prominent players of the Pakistan national team during the 1950s and 1960s.

== Club career ==
Haq represented the Punjab University football team from 1952 to 1953. He was also selected for Punjab football team at the National Football Championship, helping them win several championships.

In 1955, Haq played for Calcutta based club East Bengal for a single season. He joined the team along with fellow national Sumbal Khan. After his stint in India, Haq would return to Pakistan, joining Pakistan Western Railway.

== International career ==
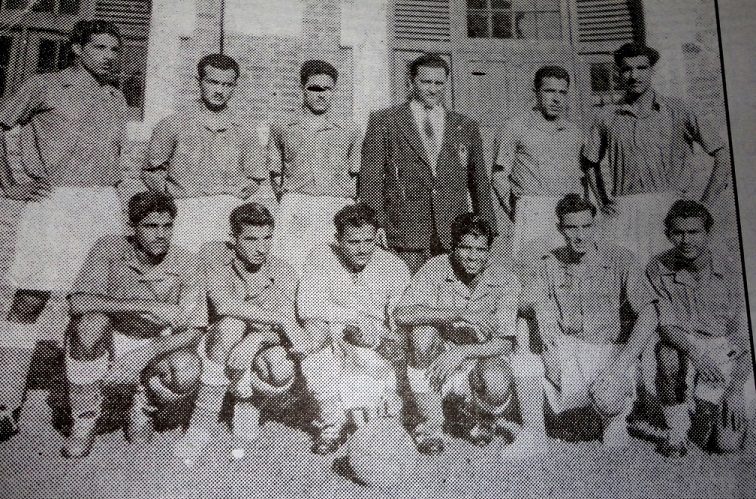
Haq with the Pakistan national team in 1953 (standing extreme left)

In 1953, Haq was selected by the Pakistan football team for the 1953 Asian Quadrangular Football Tournament held in Rangoon, Burma. The following year, he would participate in the 1954 Asian Games. In 1956, Haq toured Ceylon with the Pakistan national team for their far eastern tour, where he suffered an injury.

He served as the vice-captain of the national team at the 1958 Asian Games. He also served as the vice-captain for the 1962 Merdeka Tournament, playing an important role in the tournament, also being included in the starting line-up for the final. He made his final appearances with the national during a friendly series against China in 1963.

== Honours ==
=== Punjab ===
- National Football Championship
  - Winners (6): 1952, 1953, 1954, 1955, 1957, 1958

=== Pakistan Western Railway ===
- Aga Khan Gold Cup
  - Winners (1): 1963

== See also ==
- List of Pakistan national football team captains
