= Knuckle ball (cricket) =

Type of bowling delivery

In the sport of cricket, a knuckle ball (or knuckleball) is a type of delivery employed by a fast bowler, and a type of slower ball. Similar to a slower ball, the bowler's intention is to deceive the batter into playing too early so that they either miss the ball completely or mishit it, creating chances for the batter to be out caught.

The ball is bowled by the bowler positioning the ball underneath the knuckles of their index and middle finger, instead of in the fingers themselves. The delivery deceives the batsman as from a batter's perspective, the ball appears to be a stock delivery. However, when it is released it is slower than expected.

The delivery was adopted from baseball’s knuckleball. The physics of the operation are largely the same. However, the seam on a cricket ball is equatorial, and thus the extent of erratic movement is reduced due to the symmetry (at least in the conventional release position where the planes of the ball's trajectory and the seam are nearly co-planar).

Though Jeetan Sareen developed the knuckle ball for cricket as early as 1989, the Knuckle ball was first introduced to the world stage by India's Zaheer Khan in the 2011 Cricket World Cup . Bowlers who often use the knuckleball include India's Bhuvneshwar Kumar, Shardul Thakur, Sandeep Sharma, Deepak Chahar, Vyshak Vijay Kumar, New Zealand's Trent Boult and Australia's Andrew Tye. Tye's lethal use of the knuckleball leads to vast success in limited overs competitions, and his eventual selection for Australia. Tye's fame is largely due to his world-renowned use of the knuckleball. Jofra Archer successfully deployed the knuckleball during the 2019 Cricket World Cup and subsequent Ashes Test series against Australia while Trent Boult successfully deployed the knuckleball during the 2023 Cricket World Cup
