= Abdul Latif (footballer) =

Pakistani former footballer

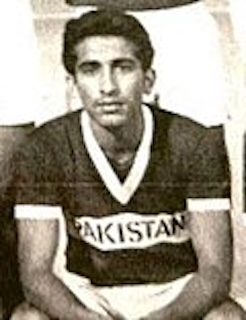
- Latif with Pakistan in 1978

Personal information
- Full name: Abdul Latif Baloch
- Date of birth: Unknown
- Place of birth: Karachi, Pakistan
- Position: Midfielder

Youth career
- Baghdad Sports

Senior career*
Years	Team	Apps	(Gls)
- Sindh Government Press
- KMC
- Habib Bank

International career
1976–1978	Pakistan		
- * Club domestic league appearances and goals

Abdul Latif Baloch (Urdu: عبداللطیف بلوچ) is a Pakistani former footballer who played as a midfielder. Latif has represented the Pakistan national team.

== Early life ==
Latif was born in Karachi, Pakistan. He started his youth career with Lyari based Baghdad Sports club.

== Club career ==
Latif played for several Karachi based departmental teams such as Sindh Government Press and KMC until eventually joining Habib Bank where he spent most part of his career. He contributed to their win in 1982 National Championship, and their runners-up position at the 1983 edition, where he scored a goal in the semi-finals in a 2–0 win against Pakistan Army. He featured at the 1986 Asian Club Championship with Habib Bank.

== International career ==
In 1976, he represented the Pakistan national team at the 1976 Quaid-e-Azam International Tournament. In 1978, Latif was selected to play for the Pakistan national team for their participation in the Saudi Arabia Football Federation International Tournament.

Four years later, he represented the second string Pakistan Blues at the 1982 Quaid-e-Azam International Tournament. In 1984, he was again selected for the Pakistan national team for the 1984 Merdeka Tournament.

== Honours ==
- National Football Championship:
  - Winners (1): 1982
  - Runners-up (1): 1983
