= Mohammad Saber Rohparwar =

Afghan footballer

Personal information
- Full name: Mohammad Saber Rohparwar
- Date of birth: 1953 (age 72–73)
- Place of birth: Mazar-i-Sharif, Afghanistan
- Position: Right winger

Senior career*
Years	Team	Apps	(Gls)
- PAS Kabul
- Kabul University
- Bamika
- Hindukush Kabul

International career
1975–1979	Afghanistan		
- * Club domestic league appearances and goals

Mohammad Saber Rohparwar (Persian: محمد صابر روح پرور; born 1953) is an Afghan former footballer who played as a right winger. He represented the Afghanistan national team in the 1970s.

== Club career ==
Rohparwar represented PAS Kabul, Kabul University, Bamika and Hindukush Kabul at domestic level. In June 1977, he scored a hat trick for Hindukush Kabul against visiting Sattar Club of Pakistan in the 7–2 victory.

== International career ==
In August 1974, Rohparwar toured China with Kabul XI, which was the de facto Afghanistan national team drawn of players selected from Kabul based clubs, and played friendly matches against local sides.

Rohparwar represented Afghanistan Youth at the 1975 AFC Youth Championship, scoring both goals in a 2–2 draw against China. In late 1975, he played with the senior national team at the 1976 AFC Asian Cup qualification.

In 1976, he scored the lone goal against rivals Pakistan during the Afghanistan Republic Day Festival Cup, scoring the winning goal on a corner kick minutes before game's end as a substitute. The same year he participated at the 1976 Quaid-e-Azam International Tournament in Pakistan.

At the 1977 edition of the Afghan Republic Day Cup, he scored the goal against Iran XI in a 1–1 draw.

In 1979, he last represented Afghanistan as captain at the 1980 AFC Asian Cup qualification, before the Soviet invasion of Afghanistan.

== Coaching career ==
He was the coach of the Kaur club. During his time as a coach he trained players such as Najib Kohyar.

== Personal life ==
Rohparwar graduated with a degree in Agricultural economics from the Kabul University in 1977.

In 1980, during the Soviet invasion and two years after the communist war, he fled to Hamburg in Germany and founded a taxi business. He then created a local Afghan football club called Ariana SV which he is currently a chairman.

His son Rohollah Rohparwar is also a footballer.

== Career statistics ==
=== International goals ===
Scores and results list Afghanistan's goal tally first, score column indicates score after each Rohparwar goal.

List of international goals scored by Mohammad Saber Rohparwar
No.	Date	Venue	Opponent	Score	Result	Competition	Ref.
1	19 July 1976	Ghazi Stadium, Kabul, Afghanistan	Pakistan	1–0	1–0	Afghanistan Republic Day Festival Cup	
2	5 March 1979	Dhaka Stadium, Dhaka, Bangladesh	Bangladesh	2–2	2–3	1980 AFC Asian Cup qualification	
