= Mateen Akhtar =

Pakistani footballer (born 1962)

Personal information
- Full name: Malik Mateen Akhtar
- Date of birth: 3 March 1962 (age 64)
- Place of birth: Rawalpindi, Pakistan
- Position: Goalkeeper

Senior career*
Years	Team	Apps	(Gls)
1982–1984	Heavy Mechanical Complex		
1985–1994	WAPDA		
1992	→ Wohaib (loan)		

International career
1984–1993	Pakistan		
- * Club domestic league appearances and goals

Malik Mateen Akhtar (born 3 March 1962), alternatively spelled Matin Akhtar, is a Pakistani former footballer who played as a goalkeeper. A former captain, Akhtar is among the major players of the Pakistan national football team in the 1980s and 1990s.

He won the 1989 and 1991 South Asian Games with Pakistan captaining the national side in the former edition, and was the starting goalkeeper at the 1990 FIFA World Cup qualification in the country's first participation in the tournament. He also captained the national team at the 1990 Asian Games.

== Club career ==
In 1982, Akhtar featured in the National Youth Football Championship. He first started his career with Heavy Mechanical Complex football team of Taxila in the Rawalpindi League.

He later became associated with WAPDA. He was also borrowed by Wohaib FC to take part in the qualifying round of the 1992–93 Asian Club Championship, where the team earned victories over Club Valencia from Maldives and Brothers Union from Bangladesh to qualify for Group B, becoming the first Pakistani club to pass the qualifying round of an Asian competition. However after the qualification, Akhtar returned to WAPDA after the start of the 1992–1993 National Football Championship, held from 20 October 1992 to 14 February 1993.

== International career ==
Akhtar made his international debut at the Merdeka Tournament in 1984, where he was praised for his performance.

He was the starting goalkeeper and captain at the 1990 FIFA World Cup qualification in the country's first participation in the tournament, featuring in all the four games. He subsequently captained the national team at the 1989 South Asian Games, helping the national side achieve the gold medal. The next year, he retained his captaincy in the 1990 Asian Games. In 1991, he won the 1991 South Asian Games as starter goalkeeper.

He featured in Pakistan's second participation at the 1994 FIFA World Cup qualification in 1993, playing in all three matches where Pakistan again ended up unsuccessful.

== Honours ==
=== Pakistan ===
- South Asian Games:
  - Winners (2): 1989, 1991

== See also ==
- List of Pakistan national football team captains
