= 1976 Quaid-e-Azam International Tournament =

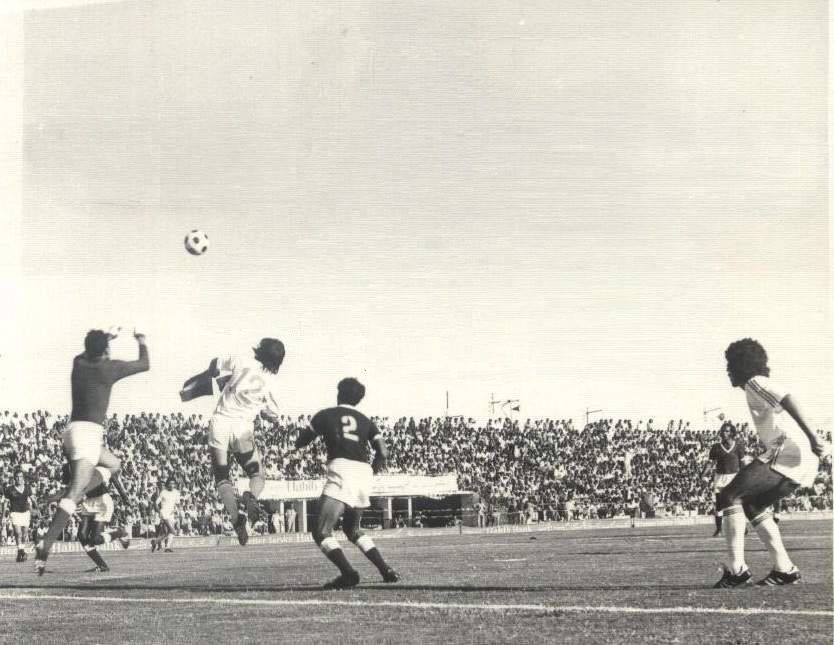
- Pakistan vs Afghanistan on 12 October 1976

Tournament details
- Host country: Pakistan
- Dates: 12–18 October 1976
- Teams: 3 (from 1 confederation)
- Venue: Hockey Club of Pakistan

Final positions
- Champions: (China) Guangdong (1st title)
- Runners-up: Pakistan Greens
- Third place: Afghanistan

Tournament statistics
- Matches played: 3
- Goals scored: 15 (5 per match)
- Top scorer: (China) Rong Zhixing (3 goals)

The 1976 Quaid-e-Azam International Tournament also called Quaid-e-Azam Birth Centenary International Football Tournament, was the first edition of the Quaid-e-Azam International Tournament. The event was held at the Hockey Stadium in Karachi, Pakistan.

== Overview ==
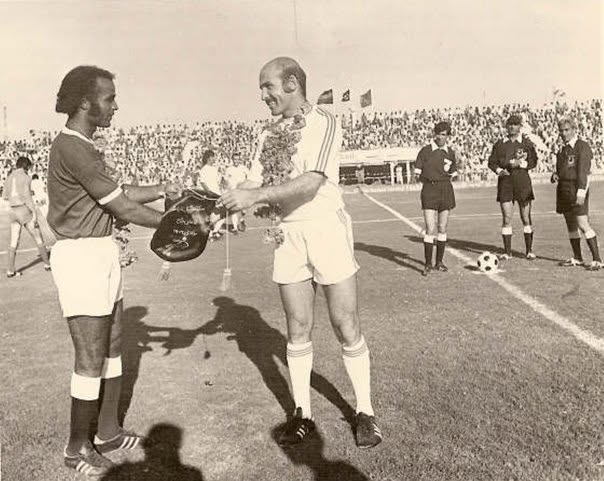
Pakistan captain Ghulam Sarwar Sr. (left), and Afghanistan captain Rahmatullah Ahmadzai (right) before the opening match between Pakistan Greens and Afghanistan

Originally scheduled for 22 October, the tournament was initially designed with two groups, Group A consisting of Chinese team Guangdong, the full Afghanistan national team, and Pakistan Greens (the full Pakistan national team). The Group B comprised Malaysia, Mauritius, and Pakistan Reds (Pakistan B team). However, in early October, the tournament's start date was abruptly moved up to 12 October. Malaysia (originally set to arrive on the 18th) and Mauritius (on the 19th) were unable to adjust their travel plans on short notice. As a result, only Group A matches were played in the initial days of the tournament.

By 16 October, the Pakistan Football Federation declared that the tournament would only include Group A, citing Malaysia's withdrawal. Additionally, Mauritius was slated to participate in exhibition matches against Pakistan and China. Subsequently, on 20 October, it was announced that Mauritius had decided to cancel its visit altogether. The Chinese team departed on 21 October.

== Venue ==
Karachi	1976 Quaid-e-Azam International Tournament is located in Pakistan
Hockey Stadium	1976 Quaid-e-Azam International Tournament is located in Pakistan
Capacity: 30,000	1976 Quaid-e-Azam International Tournament is located in Pakistan

== Squads ==
Source: RSSSF

Guangdong (China)	Afghanistan	Pakistan Greens	Pakistan Reds
Leader: Yang Guofeng; Deputy leader: Zhang Riyang; Coaches: Su Yongshun, Chen Hanlin	Leader: Zainul Abideen Usmani; Deputy leader: Sadullah Ahmadzai; Coach: Sergey Salnikov	Manager: Pir Bux; Coach: Géza Kalocsay	Manager: Allah Bux
He Jia (captain); Yang Fusheng; Jia Yuehua; Ye Xiquan; Du Qingen; Wu Zhiying; Du Zhiren; Yang Weixiang; Wei Chongjin; Rong Zhixing; Ta Jieqiu; Cai Jinbiao; Xie Zhiguang; Chen Xirong; Ou Weiting; Chen Weihao; He Jinlun; Guan Zhirui	Abdul Wakil Arghandiwal (GK); Shah Mahmood (GK); Abdul Basir Nasiri (DF); Asadullah Kazimi (DF); Mohammad Ismail (DF); Rahmatullah Ahmadzai (DF) (captain); Farid Ahmad Mawlawi (DF); Azimshah Gharibzada; Mohammad Zaman Usman (MF); Abdul Monim Kabir (FW); Mohammad Farooq Sidiq (MF); Abdul Karim Karimi (MF); Abdullah Nekzad (MF); Mohammad Yasin Safdari (MF); Mohammad Sabir Rohparwar (FW); Ahmad Shah Lali (FW); Mohammad Ibrahim Hashimi; Babar (FW); Najibullah Kargar (MF); Abdul Ghafoor Sahebi; Kalendar Shah	Ghulam Sarwar (captain); Muhammad Ishaq Changezi; Sadiq; Masood; Muhammad Akbar Raisani; Amir Bakhsh; Shafi; Saleem Butt; Abdul Latif; Rahman; Jan Muhammad; Shamim Khan; Pir Muhammad; Kazim Ali; Afzal Qasim; Muhammad Idrees; Niaz Ali Naji; Abdul Wahid Sr.	Mujahid Tareen (captain); Muhammad Naqi Khan; Tahir Jamshed; Taj; Naeem Gul; Muhammad Siddiq Raisani; Anwar; Mian Muhammad Sohail; Aziz; Lal Mohammad; Iftikhar; Salah Mohammad; Lal Bux; Muhammad Saleem; Zahoor; Ashiq; Ayub; Shamrez; Akhtar Baloch; Maqbool Ahmed Jumma

== Results ==
Pos	Team	Pld	W	D	L	GF	GA	GD	Pts	Final result
1	(China) Guangdong	2	2	0	0	11	3	+8	4	Champions
2	Pakistan Greens	2	1	0	1	2	5	−3	2	
3	Afghanistan	2	0	0	2	2	7	−5	0	

Source: RSSSF

== Matches ==
12 October 1976

Pakistan Greens	1–0	Afghanistan
Qasim 8'	Report

Hockey Club, Karachi
Attendance: 5,000
Referee: (Pakistan) Sardar Ali Dara

13 October 1976

Guangdong (China)	5–1	Pakistan Greens
Cai Jinbiao 2'; Chen Weihao 6'; Rong Zhixing; Ou Weiting	Report	Sarwar

Hockey Club, Karachi
Attendance: 8,000
Referee: (Afghanistan) Majang Sultan

17 October 1976

Guangdong (China)	6–2	Afghanistan
Wei Chongjin 6', 32'; Rong Zhixing; Ye Xiquan; Ta Jieqiu	Report	Shah 41'; Abdul Karim Karimi 75'

Hockey Club, Karachi
Attendance: 10,000
Referee: (Pakistan) Sardar Ali Dara

== Exhibition matches ==
16 October 1976

Pakistan Greens	3–2	Pakistan Reds
Kazim Ali; Sarwar	Report	Muhammad Saleem; Zahoor

Hockey Club, Karachi
18 October 1976

Guangdong (China)	8–2	Pakistan Reds
Chen Xirong; Ta Jieqiu; Wei Chongjin	Report	Salah Mohammad; Mujahid

Hockey Club, Karachi

== Statistics ==
=== Goalscorers ===
There were 15 goals scored in 3 matches, for an average of 5 goals per match.

3 goals

- (China) Rong Zhixing

2 goals

- (China) Wei Chongjin
- (China) Ou Weiting

1 goal

- (China) Cai Jinbiao
- (China) Chen Weihao
- (China) Ye Xiquan
- (China) Ta Jieqiu
- (Pakistan) Afzal Qasim
- (Pakistan) Ghulam Sarwar
- (Afghanistan) Ahmad Shah Lali
- (Afghanistan) Abdul Karim Karimi
