= Mujahid Tareen =

Pakistani footballer (born 1949)

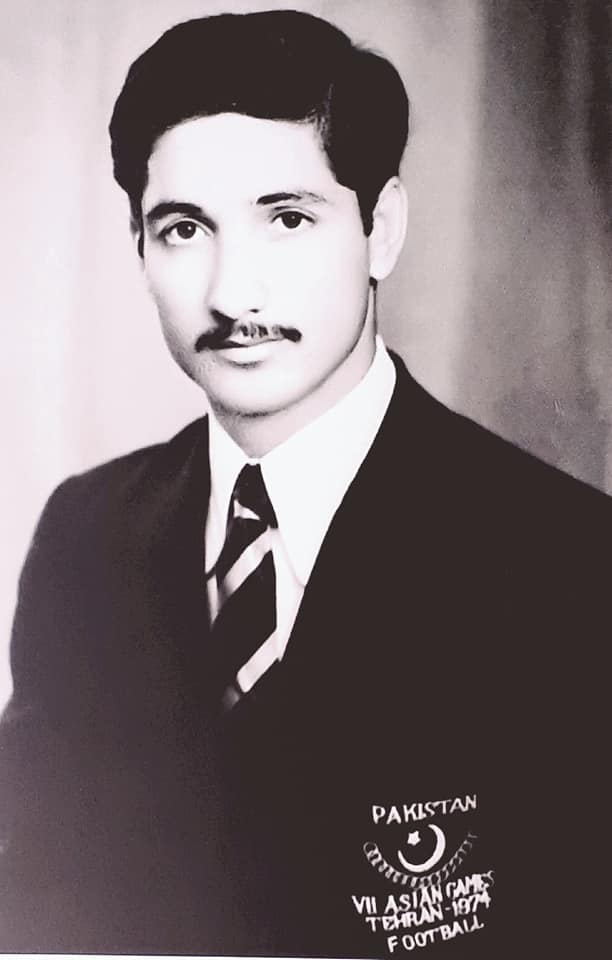
- Tareen with the Pakistan national football team at the 1974 Asian Games

Personal information
- Full name: Mujahidullah Khan Tareen
- Date of birth: 11 August 1949 (age 77)
- Place of birth: Vehari, Pakistan
- Position: Defender

Senior career*
Years	Team	Apps	(Gls)
–??	Afghan FC Multan		
1972–1982	Pakistan Army		

International career
1970–1974	Pakistan		

Managerial career
- 1985–1994: Pakistan Army
- * Club domestic league appearances and goals

Mujahidullah Khan Tareen (born 11 August 1949), commonly known as Mujahid Tareen, is a Pakistani former footballer who played as a defender. Tareen played for Pakistan Army throughout his career, and later also coached the team. He was member of the Pakistan national team in the 1970s. He also served as a Lieutenant Colonel in the Pakistan Army.

== Early life ==
Tareen was born on 11 August 1949 in Maqsooda, in the Vehari district of Pakistan.

== Club career ==
He started his football career in 1962 as a left-out in his family team named Tareen Football Club. Later, he joined Afghan Club. In 1966, he represented DFA Multan in the Youth Championship. In 1969, Tareen played for Multan Division team at the National Football Championship held in Quetta.

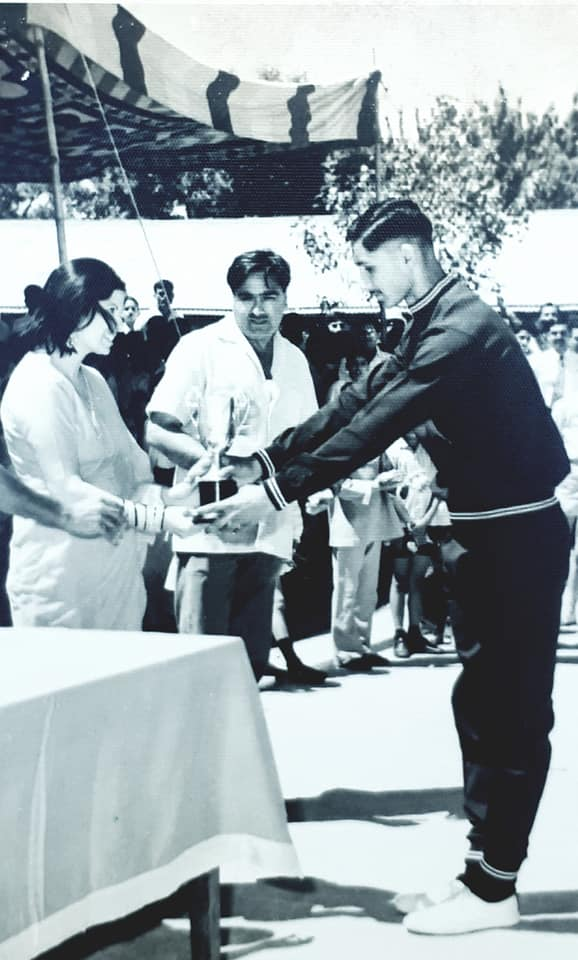
Tareen receiving best player award at the Pakistan Military Academy in July 1972

He later joined the Pakistan Army in 1972, where he became member of the Pakistan Army football team and participated in the National Championship with the team for ten consecutive years from 1973 till 1982.

== International career ==
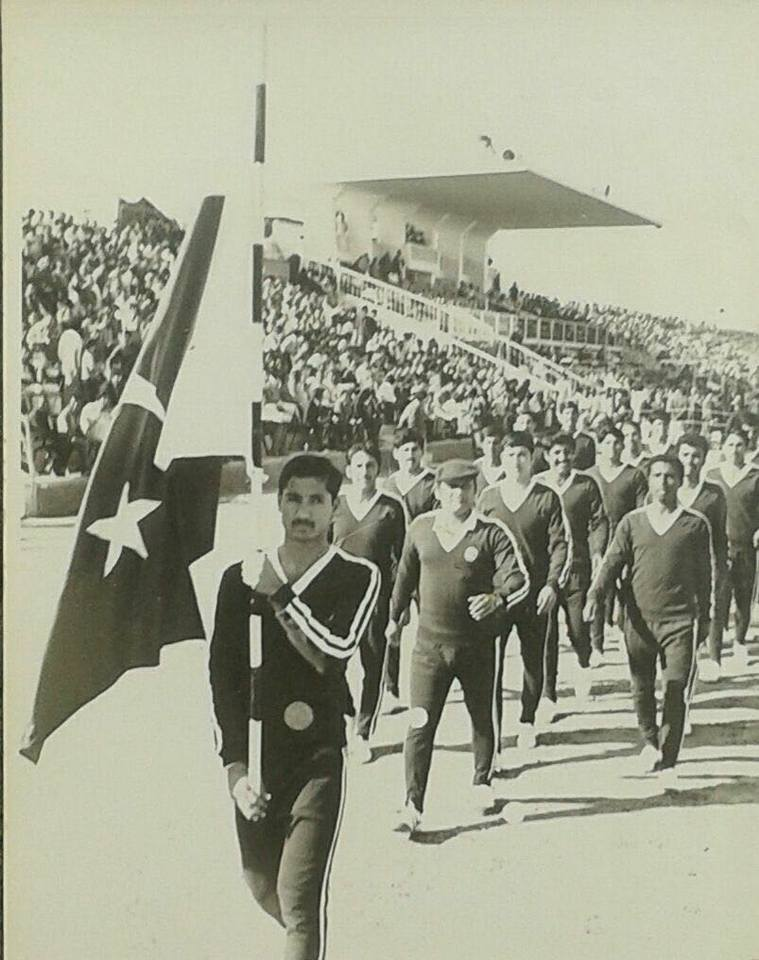
Tareen heading the Pakistan national football team at the 1974 RCD Cup

Tareen was first selected for the Pakistan national team in 1970, when the team under the name of PFF XI participated at the 1970 Friendship Cup in Tehran. The same year he participated in the 1970 RCD Cup. In 1973, he toured China, Hong Kong and North Korea with the national team.

He was also member of the team which participated at the 1974 RCD Cup and the 1974 Asian Games.

At the inaugural 1976 Quaid-e-Azam International Tournament, Tareen captained the second string Pakistan Reds football team.

== Coaching career ==
In 1985, Tareen was appointed as head coach of Pakistan Army, where he led the team to win the National Football Championship for the first time in 1993.

== Post-retirement ==
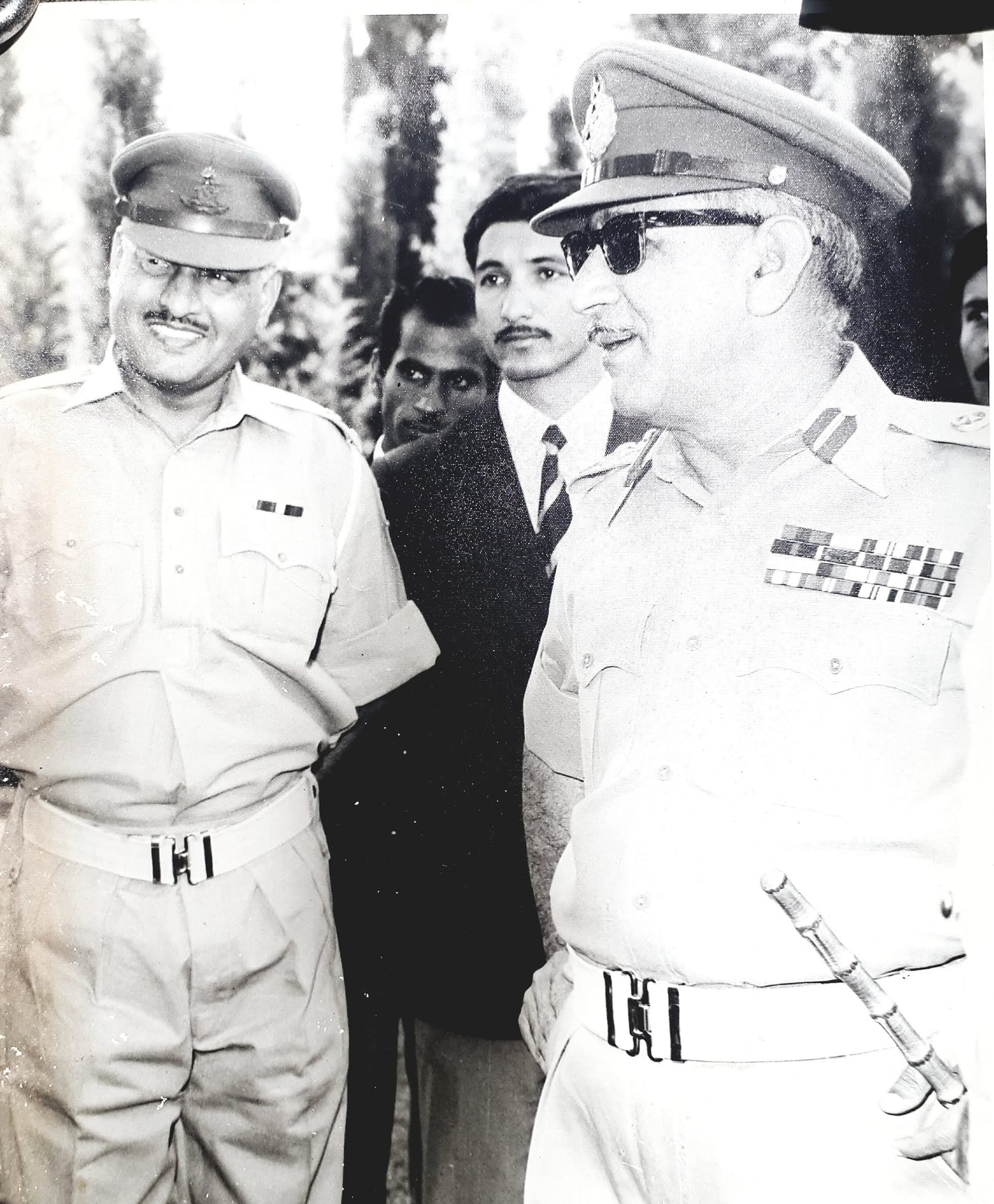
Tareen (middle) with Tikka Khan on return from the 1974 Asian Games

In 1989, Tareen got the responsibility of secretary of the Pakistan Football Federation for 6 months, when he organized the national championship in Lahore in short period, and played a crucial role in building the national team which won the gold medal at the 1989 South Asian Games in Islamabad. He retired from the Army in 1994.

Colonel Mujahid lost by one vote to Ghulam Abbas Baloch in the election for the secretary of the federation position in 1995, but in 1997–98, the president of the federation, Mian Muhammad Azhar, entrusted him with the responsibility of the federation secretariat. Tareen was crucial in voting Azhar as Army representative in PFF, which helped defeat Faisal Saleh Hayat by only one vote. From 2003 till 2007, Tareen worked with the next PFF president Faisal Saleh Hayat as technical director, and was behind the successful launch of the Pakistan Premier League in 2004, before quitting the post after differences with the PFF chief.

In 2013, Tareen was appointed as media manager of the Pakistan Olympic Association.

Tareen was appointed member of the Normalization Committee for the Pakistan Football Federation in September 2019, whose task was to hold elections of the country's football governing body and bring it would bring an end to a four-year crisis that resulted in Pakistan suffering significantly in the game. He replaced Ahmed Yar Khan Lodhi, assuming the role of interim secretary general. He was replaced in January 2021, when FIFA appointed Pakistani Canadian Haroon Malik as new chairman of the Pakistan Football Federation Normalisation Committee.
