= Said Azimshah Garibzada =

Afghan footballer

Personal information
- Full name: Said Azimshah Garibzada
- Date of birth: 5 May 1957 (age 69)
- Place of birth: Kabul, Afghanistan
- Position: Midfielder

Youth career
- 1970–1972: Parwana Club Kabul
- 1972–1974: Habibia School Kabul
- 1974–1976: Marif School Kabul

Senior career*
| Years | Team | Apps | (Gls) |
| 1976–1980 | Hindukush Kabul F.C. | | |
| 1980–1984 | TuS Schloß Neuhaus | | |
| 1984–1987 | SC Paderborn 07 | | |
| 1987–1989 | TuRa Elsen | | |
| 1989–1992 | BV Bad Lippspringe | | |
| 1992–1997 | SV Marienloh | | |

International career
| 1976–1977 | Afghanistan U20 | | |
| 1976–1979 | Afghanistan | | |

Managerial career
- 1993–1997: SV Marienloh Youth Team
- 1998–2000, 2003–2004: SV Marienloh
- * Club domestic league appearances and goals

Said Azimshah Garibzada (Persian: سیدعظیم شاه غریب زاده; born 5 May 1957) is an Afghan former football player and trainer. In 1980, he moved to Germany as a refugee and lived many years in Paderborn. He now lives in Germany.

== International career ==
He made his senior national team debut in 1976 Quaid-e-Azam International Tournament, hosted by Pakistan. He also was a member of the Afghanistan under-20 national football team and took part in the 1977 AFC Youth Championship hosted by Iran. He also took part in the at the 1980 AFC Asian Cup qualification and 1979 Aga Khan Gold Cup in Bangladesh.
