= 1973 AFC Youth Championship =

Tournament details
- Host country: Iran
- Dates: 14–27 April
- Teams: 14 (from 1 confederation)

Final positions
- Champions: Iran (1st title)
- Runners-up: Japan
- Third place: South Korea
- Fourth place: Saudi Arabia

Tournament statistics
- Matches played: 26
- Goals scored: 61 (2.35 per match)
- Top scorer(s): (Iran) Hadi Maraghi (Iran) Parviz Mazloumi (Lebanon) Hovsep Moudjoghlian (Thailand) Dusit Chaichangmee (3 goals each)

The 1973 AFC Youth Championship was held in Tehran, Iran.

== Teams ==
The following teams entered the tournament:

- Bahrain
- Burma
- Hong Kong
- India
- Indonesia
- Iran
- Japan
- Lebanon
- Malaysia
- Pakistan
- Saudi Arabia
- Singapore
- South Korea
- Thailand

== Venues ==
Tehran
Amjadieh Stadium (Field No. 2)	Amjadieh Stadium	Aryamehr Stadium
Capacity: 3,000	Capacity: 30,000	Capacity: 100,000
No Image		

== Group stage ==
=== Group A ===
Pos	Team	Pld	W	D	L	GF	GA	GD	Pts
1	Lebanon	3	1	2	0	2	0	+2	4
2	South Korea	3	1	2	0	1	0	+1	4
3	India	3	0	2	1	1	2	−1	2
4	Bahrain	3	0	2	1	1	3	−2	2

Source: RSSSF
14 April 1973

South Korea	0–0	Bahrain

14 April 1973

Lebanon	0–0	India

16 April 1973

India	1–1	Bahrain
Ali		Almas

16 April 1973

South Korea	0–0	Lebanon

18 April 1973

Lebanon	2–0	Bahrain
Moudjoghlian

20 April 1973

South Korea	1–0	India
Yoo Dong-choon

=== Group B ===
Pos	Team	Pld	W	D	L	GF	GA	GD	Pts
1	Burma	3	3	0	0	8	2	+6	6
2	Saudi Arabia	3	2	0	1	4	4	0	4
3	Indonesia	3	1	0	2	10	5	+5	2
4	Pakistan	3	0	0	3	1	12	−11	0

Source: RSSSF
15 April 1973

Burma	3–2	Indonesia
Maung Myint Kyu; Maung Mya Kyaing; Maung Ye Tun		Manaf; Hadi

15 April 1973

Saudi Arabia	2–1	Pakistan
Al-Fouzan		Qasim

18 April 1973

Indonesia	7–0	Pakistan
Sukma; Asmara; Parling; Makum; Suwendi; Sutendi

18 April 1973

Burma	2–0	Saudi Arabia
Maung Kyo Kyaing; (o.g.)

20 April 1973

Burma	3–0	Pakistan
Maung Ye Tun; Maung Myint Kyu; Sein Win Gye

21 April 1973

Saudi Arabia	2–1	Indonesia
Said		Asmara (pen.)

=== Group C ===
Pos	Team	Pld	W	D	L	GF	GA	GD	Pts
1	Thailand	2	1	0	1	5	2	+3	2
2	Singapore	2	1	0	1	2	3	−1	2
3	Hong Kong	2	1	0	1	2	4	−2	2

Source: RSSSF
17 April 1973

Thailand	4–0	Hong Kong
Dusit; Nut

20 April 1973

Singapore	2–1	Thailand
Brian Batchelor		Prayoon

21 April 1973

Hong Kong	2–0	Singapore
Lau Wing Yip

=== Group D ===
Pos	Team	Pld	W	D	L	GF	GA	GD	Pts
1	Iran	2	2	0	0	6	1	+5	4
2	Japan	2	0	1	1	2	4	−2	1
3	Malaysia	2	0	1	1	3	6	−3	1

Source: RSSSF
13 April 1973

Iran	2–0	Japan
Mazloumi; Moussafi

16 April 1973

Malaysia	2–2	Japan
Mokhtar Dahari (pen.); Fadzi Ahmad		Ohata; Usui

20 April 1973

Iran	4–1	Malaysia
Mazloumi; Maraghi		Vincent Doss

== Knockout stage ==
=== Quarterfinals ===
23 April 1973

South Korea	1–0	Burma
Song Byung-duk

23 April 1973

Saudi Arabia	1–1	Lebanon
Harith		Moudjoghlian
Penalties
	8–7

23 April 1973

Iran	1–0	Singapore
Mazloumi

23 April 1973

Japan	0–0	Thailand
Penalties
	5–3

=== Semifinals ===
25 April 1973

Japan	3–0	Saudi Arabia
Nakai; Ohata; Horii

25 April 1973

Iran	1–0	South Korea
Yousefi

=== Third-place match ===
27 April 1973

South Korea	3–0	Saudi Arabia
Yoo Dong-choon; Park Jon-won; Shin Hyung-ho

=== Final ===
27 April 1973

Iran	2–0	Japan
Masihnia; Yousefi

Aryamehr Stadium

1973 AFC Youth Championship

Iran
First title

== Goalscorers ==
There were 61 goals scored in 26 matches, for an average of 2.35 goals per match.

3 goals

- (Iran) Hadi Maraghi
- (Iran) Parviz Mazloumi
- (Lebanon) Hovsep Moudjoghlian
- (Thailand) Dusit Chaichangmee

2 goals

- (Myanmar) Maung Myint Kyu
- (Myanmar) Maung Ye Tun
- (Hong Kong) Lau Wing Yip
- (Indonesia) Anjas Asmara
- (Indonesia) Suwendi
- (Iran) Mohsen Yousefi
- (Japan) Yukio Ohata
- (South Korea) Yoo Dong-choon
- (Saudi Arabia) Said Al-Fouzan
- (Saudi Arabia) Abdul-Mohsen Said
- (Singapore) Brian Batchelor

1 goal

- (Bahrain) Johar Almas
- (Myanmar) Maung Mya Kyaing
- (Myanmar) Maung Kyo Kyaing
- (Myanmar) Sein Win Gye
- (Indonesia) Abdul Manaf
- (India) Shabbir Ali
- (Indonesia) Sofyan Hadi
- (Indonesia) Makum
- (Indonesia) Parling
- (Indonesia) Irwan Sukma
- (Indonesia) Sutendi
- (Iran) Masih Masihnia
- (Iran) Mohsen Moussafi
- (Japan) Hiroshi Nakai
- (Japan) Hiroyuki Usui
- (Japan) Yoshiharu Horii
- (South Korea) Park Jon-won
- (South Korea) Shin Hyung-ho
- (South Korea) Song Byung-duk
- (Malaysia) Fadzi Ahmad
- (Malaysia) Mokhtar Dahari
- (Malaysia) Vincent Doss
- (Pakistan) Afzal Qasim
- (Saudi Arabia) Abdul-Aziz Harith
- (Thailand) Nut Numrongveit
- (Thailand) Prayoon Shachana

1 own goal

- (Saudi Arabia) (against Burma)
