= Ali Askar Lali =

Afghan footballer and trainer

Personal information
- Full name: Ali Askar Lali
- Date of birth: 1957 (age 68–69)
- Place of birth: Afghanistan
- Position: Midfielder

Senior career*
Years	Team	Apps	(Gls)
?–1979	Kabul F.C.		
1980s	SC Paderborn 07		
1980s	TuS Schloß Neuhaus		
1990s	Delbrücker SC		
1990s	VfL Lichtenau		

International career
1977	Afghanistan U20		
1975–1979	Afghanistan		

Managerial career
- TuRa Elsen
- VfL Lichtenau
- Türk Gücü Paderborn
- 2002: Afghanistan U-23
- 2003–2005: Afghanistan
- 2007–2008: Afghanistan Women
- 2009–2010: Afghanistan U-15
- 2011–2016: Afghanistan(Assistant manager)
- * Club domestic league appearances and goals

Ali Askar Lali (Persian: علی عسکر لعلی) is an Afghan former football player and trainer. In 1981, he moved to Germany as a refugee and lived for many years in Paderborn. He now lives in Germany and Afghanistan. He was previously the assistant manager of the Afghanistan national football team.

As a coach Lali currently participates in a project of the Foreign Office to promote Afghan women's football and trained the Afghan women's national team.

== National career ==
He was included in the Afghanistan national under-20 football team at the 1977 AFC Youth Championship hosted by Iran. At senior level, he participated in 1976 Quaid-e Azam International Football Tournament hosted by Pakistan and the 1980 Olympic Games qualification.
