= Muhammad Naveed (footballer) =

Pakistani footballer

Personal information
- Full name: Muhammad Naveed
- Date of birth: Unknown
- Place of birth: Faisalabad, Pakistan
- Position: Centre-back

Senior career*
Years	Team	Apps	(Gls)
- Pakistan Army

International career
1984–1989	Pakistan		(1)
- * Club domestic league appearances and goals

Muhammad Naveed (Urdu: محمد نوید) also known as Chaudhry Naveed, is a Pakistani former footballer who played as a centre-back. Naveed served as captain of the Pakistan national team from 1986 to 1988, including at the 1986 Asian Games held in Seoul. He also won the 1989 South Asian Games with Pakistan, and was the starting defender at the 1990 FIFA World Cup qualification, marking the country's first ever participation in the tournament.

== Club career ==
Naveed played for Pakistan Army throughout his career at the National Football Championship.

== International career ==
Naveed served as captain of the Pakistan national team from 1986 to 1988. He was the captain at the 1986 Asian Games held in Seoul, marking the country's return to the football tournament after 12 years. He also won the 1989 South Asian Games, and started in the final against Bangladesh which ended in a 1–0 victory. Naveed was also the starting defender in all the four matches at the 1990 FIFA World Cup qualification, the country's first ever participation in the tournament.

== Career statistics ==
=== International goals ===
Scores and results list Pakistan's goal tally first, score column indicates score after each Naveed goal.

List of international goals scored by Muhammad Naveed
No.	Date	Venue	Opponent	Score	Result	Competition	Ref.
1	2 May 1986	Jinnah Sports Stadium, Islamabad	Nepal	2–0	5–0	1986 Quaid-e-Azam International Tournament	

== Honours ==
=== Pakistan ===
- South Asian Games:
  - Winners (1): 1989

== See also ==
- List of Pakistan national football team captains
