= Slower ball =

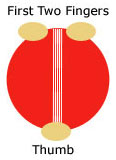
Slower ball grip

In the sport of cricket, a slower ball is a slower-than-usual delivery from a fast bowler. The bowler's intention is to deceive the batsman into playing too early so that he either misses the ball completely or mishits it, creating chances for him to be out caught. It is analogous to a changeup in baseball.

The slower ball technique was popularised in response to the demands of limited-overs cricket, not only to get wickets but also to slow down the scoring rate, as a slower ball will not carry to the boundary as easily as a normal fast delivery if it is hit square or behind the wicket. It is especially used in the last ten or so overs as variation in speed, in addition to line and length, is the key to preventing a late flurry of runs from the batsmen.

To be effective, the slower ball must be directed at or near the stumps in order to force the batsman to play, and the bowler's action must appear entirely normal. There are various tricks that the bowler can employ to slow the ball down:

- Bowling from the back of the hand, effectively a fast googly
- Bowling with split fingers: the fingers are placed either side of the seam of the ball, and the ball is bowled full-length; when done correctly the delivery will appear to be a full toss until it suddenly drops. A similar technique is used to throw the split-finger fastball in baseball. Sri Lankan Dilhara Fernando holds the ball between the index and middle finger, and just fits it in the webbing between the two. This leads to the delivery of a slow loopy ball
- Bowling a knuckleball, where the ball is held on the knuckles of the index and middle fingers. To a batsman, it resembles a stock ball due to it appearing as if the bowler was holding the ball in a regulation manner
- Off cutter: instead of placing the index and middle fingers in the orthodox position together on the seam, the middle finger is moved round the ball slightly and then pulled down as the ball is released. The ball will tend to "break" or "cut in" from left to right as it pitches, as it does with off spin bowling. It can be effective to only bowl this ball with a single finger on top and it typically rests to the right hand side of the seam
- Leg cutter: the same as an off cutter except that the fingers go the other way and the ball will tend to cut from right to left. Harder to keep straight than an off cutter
- Palm ball: the ball is held in the palm instead of the fingers; this can be effective but is hard to disguise
- Holding the ball deeper in the fingers. Typically, quick bowlers hold the ball at their fingertips. Holding the ball deeper within the fingers slows the release of the ball. Brett Lee is an exponent of this method
- Reduction in the speed of the action: Can be quite effective as a "different" type of change of pace. Effectively you change only the rotation of your arm and retain your action
- Cross-seam: This type of slower delivery is also popularly employed by medium pacers wherein the bowler holds the ball across the seam instead of holding it on the seam thereby the pace of delivery is reduced when the ball hits the ground. New Zealand medium pace bowler Gavin Larsen used this effectively in the 1999 Cricket World Cup. This can be coupled with a "split fingers" style release to result in a delivery which dips sharply at the end of its trajectory or spits from a pitched-up length
- Zero rotation: Using a specific type of grip & release it is possible to impart little or no rotation on the ball. This lack of rotation causes an instability in air pressure, which makes the ball move erratically through the air
- Single finger: Using a variation on the in-swinger grip where the index finger and thumb are both fully on the seam of the ball and the second finger barely touches it. Less force on the ball at the point of release results in reduced pace
- Thumb ball: Bowled using the same grip as a stock delivery, barring the palm position, which is facing up instead of down, so that it looks like a back of the hand grip. This can be an effective delivery, but it is hard to produce

== Faster ball ==
Although a slower ball is usually the result when a bowler tries a change of pace, some bowlers have a delivery which is even faster. Pakistani Imran Khan was one example: in his coaching book, he mentioned that it was far more effective to have a faster ball than a slower one.

Spinners and slow bowlers generally employ the faster ball more often than pacemen. Pakistan's Shahid Afridi has used this ball quite successfully over his career.
