= Naeem Gul =

Pakistani footballer

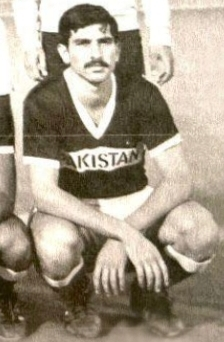
- Gul with Pakistan in 1978

Personal information
- Full name: Naeem Gul
- Date of birth: 27 February 1954 (age 72)
- Place of birth: Abbottabad, Pakistan
- Position: Defender

Senior career*
Years	Team	Apps	(Gls)
??–1976	Hazara Zamindar		
1977–1987	Pakistan Airlines		

International career
1978–1982	Pakistan		
- * Club domestic league appearances and goals

Naeem Gul (Urdu: نعیم گل; born 27 February 1954) is a Pakistani former footballer who played as a defender. He is regarded as one of the best defenders to play for Pakistan in the 1980s. He also served as captain of the national team in 1982 –1983.

== Early life ==
Gul was born on 27 February 1954 in Abbottabad, in the Hazara region of Pakistan.

== Club career ==
Gul played for Abbottabad based club Hazara Zamindar, before joining Pakistan Airlines. He became one of the key players of the side winning the National Football Championship several times.

== International career ==
Gul was part of the Pakistan Reds team at the 1976 Quaid-e-Azam International Tournament. Two years later, he was part of the Pakistan national team for the Saudi Arabia Football Federation International Tournament in 1978.

In 1981, he toured Burma with the national team and featured at the 1981 King's Cup in Thailand. The next year, he was selected vice captain at the 1982 Quaid-e-Azam International Tournament in Karachi, which included national teams from Bangladesh, Iran, Nepal, and Oman. He was a starter in all matches for Pakistan. He later captained the national team at the 1982 Bangladesh President's Gold Cup. He also captained the national team during the two matches against the touring Southwest German FA in January 1983. He last represented the national team at the 1984 Merdeka Tournament.

== Post-retirement ==
Gul served as Khyber Pakhtunkhwa Assistant Director of Youth Affairs in 2022.

== See also ==
- List of Pakistan national football team captains
