= Ye Xiquan =

Chinese footballer (born 1955)

Ye Xiquan 叶细权
Personal information
- Full name: Ye Xiquan
- Date of birth: 1955 (age 70–71)
- Place of birth: Meizhou, Guangdong, China
- Position: Left-back

Senior career*
| Years | Team | Apps | (Gls) |
| 1974–1983 | Guangdong | | |

Managerial career
- 1986–1987: Guangdong
- * Club domestic league appearances and goals

Ye Xiquan
- Simplified Chinese: 叶细权
- Traditional Chinese: 葉細權
Transcriptions
Standard Mandarin
- Hanyu Pinyin: Yè xìquán
- Wade–Giles: Yè^{1}xì^{1}quán^{2}

Ye Xiquan (Chinese: 叶细权; pinyin: Yè xìquán; born 1955) is a Chinese retired footballer and politician. As a player, he played as a left-back for Guangdong throughout the 1970s and early 1980s, winning many titles for the club. He currently serves as chairman of the Guangdong Football Association since 2016.

== Career as a player ==
Ye began his career within Guangdong following the re-establishment of a domestic football league within China. He gained his first taste of success through the 1975 National Games of China where he was part of the winning squad for the tournament. He also won the 1979 National Football Jia League with his performance throughout the tournament earning him the honor of National-Level Athlete before retiring in 1983.

== Career as a manager ==
Ye continued to remain active in the world of football even with his retirement as he immediately served as manager of the youth sector within Guangdong. His relative success led him to be promoted to the senior squad in 1986 with his greatest achievement with the club being through their victory at the 1987 National Games of China.

== Administrative career ==
Despite his success in managing clubs, Ye chose to work within the administrative sector of Guangdong football, becoming the Deputy Director of the Guangdong Provincial Sports Bureau in 1998. His career progressed into the 2000s as he later became the Deputy Director of the Sports Bureau. One of his greatest contributions to Guangdong football came in 2010 as he was part of the organizing committee for the 2010 Asian Games as Deputy Secretary-General. In 2016, he was made Chairman of the 10th Guangdong Football Association with his first tenure seeing him receiving the Guangdong Sports Work Contribution Medal in 2017 and the Guangdong Football 70-Year Honorary Award in 2019. Due to this, his position as chairman remained intact for the 11th Association in 2020. Throughout his tenure as Chairman, he aimed to promote youth football in his home province, increasing the number of youth football registrations to 15,051 and helped organize the establishment of 4,236 schools specializing in football. As of 2024, he has remained in position of Chairman for the 12th association.
