= Mohsen Yousefi (footballer, born 1954) =

Iranian footballer

Personal information
- Date of birth: 26 May 1954 (age 72)
- Place of birth: Iran
- Height: 1.68 m (5 ft 6 in)
- Position: Midfielder

Senior career*
Years	Team	Apps	(Gls)
1973–1975	Rah Ahan		
1975–1978	Daraei		

International career
1977–1978	Iran	2	(1)
- * Club domestic league appearances and goals

Mohsen Yousefi (Persian: محسن یوسفی, born 26 May 1954) is an Iranian retired association footballer. He has played for Iran national football team twice, scoring a goal against Saudi Arabia.
