= Abdul Sattar Edhi Hockey Stadium =

Hockey Stadium in Karachi, Pakistan

Coordinates: 24°51′1″N 67°2′17″E

- عبدالستار ایدھی ہاکی سٹیڈیم
- Interactive map of Abdul Sattar Edhi Hockey Stadium
- Former names: Hockey Club of Pakistan
- Location: Hockey Club of Pakistan Road, Karachi Cantonment, Karachi, Pakistan
- Owner: Karachi Cantonment Board
- Operator: Pakistan Hockey Federation
- Capacity: 30,000
- Surface: AstroTurf

Construction
- Opened: 1963; 63 years ago

Tenant
- Pakistan national field hockey team

Abdul Sattar Edhi Hockey Stadium, known until 2016 as the Hockey Club of Pakistan, is a field hockey stadium located in Karachi, Sindh, Pakistan.

== History ==
The stadium was constructed in 1963 under the administration of Karachi Cantonment Board. It was opened in 1966. The stadium was leased to Pakistan Hockey Federation for a period of 30 years, until 1993. The lease was renewed for another 30 years, till 2023. However, the structure has been declared as dangerous by the Karachi Cantonment Board and Sindh Building Control Authority.

In July 2022, plans were announced to renovate the stadium by the Pakistan Hockey Federation and the Government of Sindh. Frontier Works Organization has been contracted to conduct the work at a budget of Rs. 1.5 billion. The project is stated to include the installation of seats, indoor gyms, swimming pools, boys' hostel, and changing rooms.

== Tournaments hosted ==
The stadium has hosted matches of the 1980, 1981, 1983, 1984, 1986, and 1992 editions of the Champions Trophy. The stadium has a capacity of 30,000 people. However, the International Hockey Federation stripped it of its international status in 2008 since it no longer had a practice pitch and a parking lot. Two editions of National Games of Pakistan have taken place here.

The stadium was also the venue for football matches during the 1974 RCD Cup and the inaugural 1976 Quaid-e-Azam International Tournament.

== Football tournaments ==
=== 1974 RCD Cup ===
The stadium was the venue for the 1974 RCD Cup.

Date	Team #1	Res.	Team #2	Round	Attendance
17 January 1974	Malavan (Iran)	2–1	Pakistan	Round Robin	5,000
18 January 1974	Pakistan	2–2	Turkey	Round Robin	N/A
20 January 1974	Malavan (Iran)	0–1	Turkey	Round Robin	N/A

=== 1976 Quaid-e-Azam International Tournament ===
The stadium was the venue for the 1976 Quaid-e-Azam International Tournament.

Date	Team #1	Res.	Team #2	Round	Attendance
12 October 1976	Pakistan Greens	1–0	Afghanistan	Round Robin	5,000
13 October 1976	(China) Guangdong	5–1	Pakistan Greens	Round Robin	8,000
16 October 1976	Pakistan Greens	3–2	Pakistan Reds	Exhibition match	N/A
17 October 1976	(China) Guangdong	6–2	Afghanistan	Round Robin	10,000
18 October 1976	(China) Guangdong	8–2	Pakistan Reds	Exhibition match	N/A
