= Afghanistan Republic Day Festival Cup =

Football tournament in Afghanistan

- Organiser(s): Afghanistan Football Federation
- Founded: 1974; 52 years ago
- Abolished: 1977; 49 years ago
- Region: Asia

The Afghanistan Republic Day Festival Cup was an annual football tournament held in Ghazi Stadium, Afghanistan. The football tournament was part of a festival of sporting and cultural events staged annually in Kabul from 1974 till 1977 to commemorate the anniversary of the Republic of Afghanistan, following its foundation on 17 July 1973 when Mohammad Daoud Khan came to power following the 1973 Afghan coup d'état. It was stopped following Daoud's assassination on 28 April 1978 during a coup d'état (the Saur Revolution) which formed the Democratic Republic of Afghanistan. The anniversary of the Saur Revolution was also celebrated with a similar Jashn festival later on in 1979, which was won by Pamir Dushanbe for the fifth consecutive time. The 1976 edition also featured the official national teams of India and Pakistan.

== Etymology ==
The festival was referred to as Jashn-e-Jamhouriat (lit. 'Republic festival'), Jashn-e-Kabul, or simply Jashn. It was also referred to in the Kabul Times newspaper as the Jame-Jamhouriat Cup (lit. 'Republic Day Cup'), or as Jamhouriat Cup.

== Results ==
Year	Winner	Runner-up	Third place	Fourth place	Fifth place	Sixth place	Teams
1974; Details	(Soviet Union); CSKA Pamir	(Iran); Sanat Naft Abadan	Afghanistan	(India); Indian Air Force			4
1975; Details	(Soviet Union); CSKA Pamir	(Iran); Isfahan XI	(Turkey); Orduspor	Afghanistan	Afghanistan Youth		5
1976; Details	(Soviet Union); CSKA Pamir	Afghanistan A	India	(Iran); Aboomoslem	Pakistan	Afghanistan B	6
1977; Details	(Soviet Union); CSKA Pamir	(Iran); Shahbaz	India	Afghanistan A	Afghanistan B	(Pakistan); Shaheen Club	6

== See also ==
- Football in Asia
- Football in Afghanistan
