= 1963 Dhaka First Division Football League =

Dhaka First Division Football League
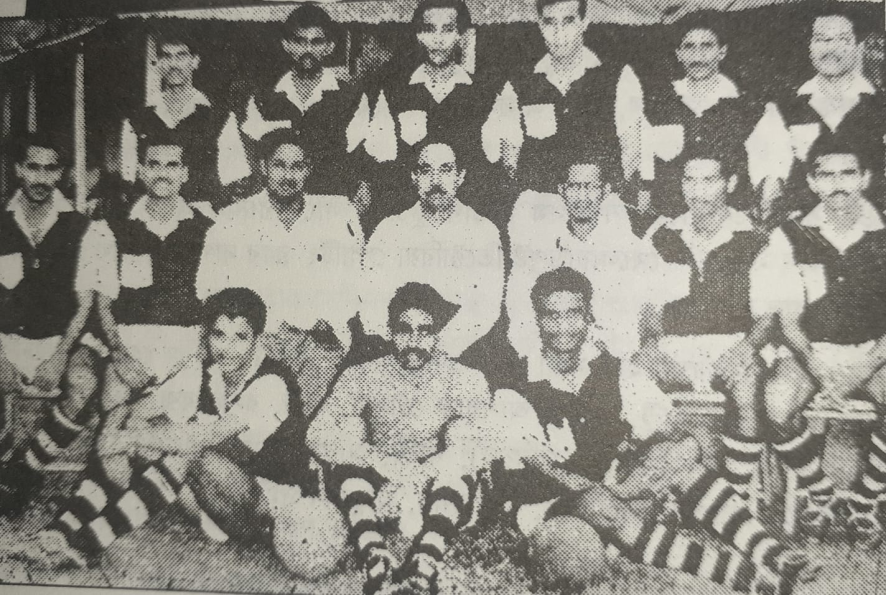
- The Mohammedan Sporting team which won the league
- Season: 1963
- Dates: 15 May 1963 – 29 August 1963
- Teams: 13 (Victoria withdrew)
- Champions: Mohammedan Sporting
- Relegated: None
- Matches: 324
- Goals: 648 (2 per match)
- Top goalscorer: (Pakistan) Qayyum Changezi (27 goals)

The 1963 Dhaka First Division Football League, was the 16th edition of the Dhaka First Division Football League following the partition of India. It was played from 15 May 1963 to 29 August 1963, with the venues being the Inner Stadium, Outer Stadium, and the Dacca Stadium. The league was won by Mohammedan Sporting, who finished with 42 points.

== Overview ==
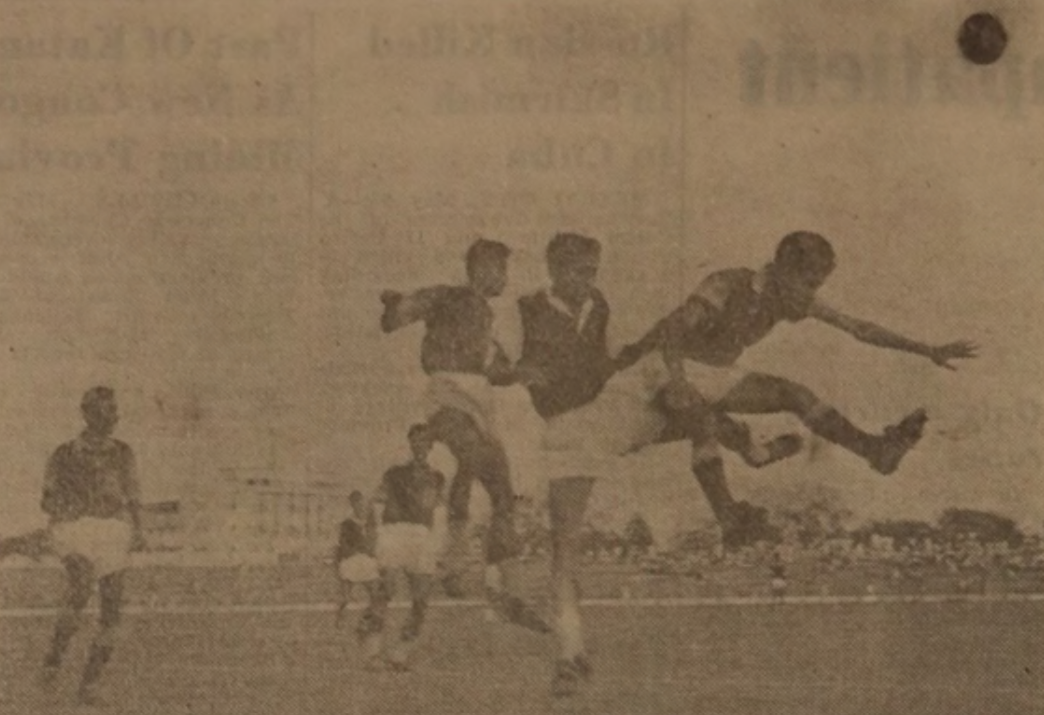
Action between P.E. Railway and Dacca Wanderers, on 23 May 1963.

The 1963 Dhaka First Division Football League began on 15 May 1963 and ran till 29 August 1963, several players were imported from various regions, such as, Qayyum Changezi from Quetta signed with Dhaka Mohammedan, along with mid season additions of striker, Mohammed Rahmatullah, and Rafat Ali of Kolkata Mohammedan, due to the recruitment experience of official Amir Jang Ghaznavi. Dhaka Wanderers also signed Hanif, and Aslam of West Pakistan.

The league would be won by Dhaka Mohammedan Club, who had played 22 games, accumulated 42 points in total, with Qayyum Changezi finishing the top goal-scorer of the league with 27 goals to his name. With Dacca Wanderers and PWD finishing second and third respectively.

=== Controversy ===
On 27 July 1963, Victoria Sporting Club announced their withdrawal from the First Division League, lodging a complaint to the East Pakistan Sports Federation, due to several factors regarding discrimination and unfair means. The club argued that:

- Several of Victoria's players were treated with racial abuse and discrimination. Even proclaiming that the Pakistan Observer deliberately spread racial prejudice regarding their players, labelling the team as the "Makrani XI".
- The club tent was attacked on a regular basis on numerous occasions by fans on the Outer Stadium.
- Players of the club felt unsafe and concerned for their safety as bystanders would misbehave and call out slurs to them.
- Victoria's board of directors also argued that the rematch between Victoria and Mohammedan Sporting was deemed unnecessary and unfair, stating that it was a clear violation of international rules.
- The board also brought up how no action was taken on Nabi Chowdhury for misbehaving in a match between Victoria and Police.
- Yousuf Sr., a player of Victoria and Pakistan International, faced severe physical abuse, even being openly slapped in field of play.

The Pakistan Observer, fired back, stating that several of the statements given by the club were false, and that the club had used the East Pakistan Sports Federation, fans, and the daily itself as scapegoats. Mentioning that one of the club's players reportedly beat an almond seller after a drawn game between Victoria and PWD. The daily also wrote that promoting East Pakistani talent was far more of a better approach than importing and employing West Pakistani players. Denying any form of racism or discriminatory publishing.

Muhammad Umer, the captain of the team also came out and criticised the newspaper, stating that it deliberately labelled the team as a "Makrani XI" to stir up hatred among the two wings.

== League table ==
Pos	Team	Pld	W	D	L	GF	GA	GD	Pts
1	Mohammedan	22	21	0	1	60	12	+48	42
2	Dhaka Wanderers	21	12	5	4	48	11	+37	29
3	PWD	21	12	3	6	31	20	+11	27
4	Ispahani Club	22	10	4	8	35	21	+14	24
5	Azad	18	10	3	5	34	29	+5	23
6	Police	19	8	4	7	19	15	+4	20
7	Wari	19	6	5	8	21	32	−11	17
8	P.E. Railway	21	6	4	11	22	33	−11	16
9	Central Stationary	20	6	3	11	21	28	−7	15
10	EGP Press	20	3	5	12	14	32	−18	11
11	EP Rifles	17	2	4	11	15	36	−21	8
12	Central Jail	18	2	2	14	4	55	−51	6

Source: Matches
Rules for classification: 1) Points; 2) Goal difference; 3) Goals scored;

== Matches ==
15 May 1963	Pakistan Eastern Railway	1–1	Azad Sporting	Dacca, East Pakistan
	Shanker 25'	Report	Hafiz 69'	Stadium: Dacca Stadium; Referee: Issa Khan

16 May 1969	PWD	1–0	Central Printing Stationary	Dacca, East Pakistan
	Faiz 52'	Report		Stadium: Dacca Stadium; Referee: Nani Bashak

17 May 1963	Victoria	'Abandoned' at 3–0	Dacca Central Jail	Dacca, East Pakistan
	Yousuf Sr. Abdullah	Report		Stadium: Dacca Stadium

18 May 1963	Mohammedan Sporting	1–0	East Pakistan Rifles	Dacca, East Pakistan
	Ashraf 13'	Report		Stadium: Dacca Stadium; Referee: Issa Khan

19 May 1963	Dacca Wanderers	1–1	EGP Press	Dacca, East Pakistan
	Aziz 45'		Anil 48'	Stadium: Dacca Stadium; Referee: M. A. Hamza

20 May 1963	Ispahani Club	2–1	PWD	Dacca, East Pakistan
	Nishith	Report	Manzoor	Stadium: Dacca Stadium; Referee: Nani Bashak

20 May 1963	Pakistan Eastern Railway	3–0	Central Jail	Dacca, East Pakistan
	Macwa 21'; Bashir 50'; Mukul 56'	Report		Stadium: Dacca Stadium; Referee: Munir Hossain

21 May 1963	Victoria	2–0	Central Printing Stationary	Dacca, East Pakistan
	Umer 10'; Yousuf Sr. 44'			Stadium: Dacca Stadium; Referee: Masudur Rahman

22 May 1963	Mohammedan Sporting	1–0	Police	Dacca, East Pakistan
	Qayyum 40'	Report		Stadium: Dacca Stadium; Referee: M.A. Hamza

23 May 1963	Dacca Wanderers	1–0	Pakistan Eastern Railway	Dacca, East Pakistan
	Raymond 24'	Report		Stadium: Dacca Stadium; Referee: Mohammad Ali

23 May 1963	Ispahani Club	5–0	Central Jail	Dacca, East Pakistan
	Nishith 8', 10', 50' (pen.); Pratul 55'	Report		Stadium: Dacca Stadium; Referee: Nazar Mohammad

24 May 1963	Victoria	4–1	PWD	Dacca, East Pakistan
	Yousuf Sr. 17', 45'; Yousuf Jr. Umer 55'	Report		Stadium: Dacca Stadium; Referee: Zahurul Alam

24 May 1963	Central Printing Stationary	0–0	East Pakistan Rifles	Dacca, East Pakistan
		Report		Stadium: Outer Stadium; Referee: Masudur Rahman

25 May 1963	Mohammedan Sporting	4–1	Wari	Dacca, East Pakistan
	Bashir 10'; Qayyum 45', 55'; Kabir 60'	Report	? 15'	Stadium: Dacca Stadium; Referee: Nani Bashak

26 May 1963	Dacca Wanderers	1–1	Azad Sporting	Dacca, East Pakistan
	Patrick 29'		Milal 42'	Stadium: Dacca Stadium; Referee: Munshi

27 May 1963	Victoria	12–0	Ispahani Club	Dacca, East Pakistan
	Umer; Abbas; Yousuf Sr.	Report		Stadium: Dacca Stadium; Referee: Zahurul Alam

27 May 1963	Pakistan Eastern Railway	1–1	East Pakistan Rifles	Dacca, East Pakistan
	Shanker 43'	Report	Taju 47'	Stadium: Dacca Stadium; Referee: M. Hamza

28 May 1963	Mohammedan Sporting	3–0	EGP Press	Dacca, East Pakistan
	Qayyum 8', 10', 18'	Report		Stadium: Dacca Stadium; Referee: Issa Khan

28 May 1963	Wari	0–0	Dacca Central Jail	Dacca, East Pakistan
		Report		Stadium: Dacca Stadium; Referee: Nazar Mohammad

29 May 1963	Dacca Wanderers	2–0	Central Printing Stationary	Dacca, East Pakistan
	Patrick 50', 55'	Report		Stadium: Dacca Stadium; Referee: Zahurul Alam

29 May 1963	Ispahani Club	2–0	Police	Dacca, East Pakistan
	Nishith 23'; Bishtoo 40'	Report		Stadium: Dacca Stadium; Referee: Nani Bashak

30 May 1963	PWD	1–0	Azad Sporting	Dacca, East Pakistan
	Shova 69'	Report		Stadium: Dacca Stadium; Referee: Issa Khan

30 May 1963	EGP Press	2–0	Pakistan Eastern Railway	Dacca, East Pakistan
		Report		Stadium: Dacca Stadium; Referee: Mohammad Ali

31 May 1963	Victoria	6–0	East Pakistan Rifles	Dacca, East Pakistan
	Umer 6', 8', 34'; Abdullah 19'; Abbas 40'; Yousuf Sr. 69'	Report		Stadium: Dacca Stadium; Referee: Issa Khan

31 May 1963	Police	4–0	Dacca Central Jail	Dacca, East Pakistan
	Sattar 5', 42', 49'; Shapur 47'	Report		Stadium: Dacca Stadium; Referee: Rashid Chunna

1 June 1963	Mohammedan Sporting	1–0	Central Printing Stationary	Dacca, East Pakistan
	Qayyum 29'	Report		Stadium: Dacca Stadium; Referee: Masudur Rahman

1 June 1963	EGP Press	1–0	Wari	Dacca, East Pakistan
	Malik 54'	Report		Stadium: Dacca Stadium; Referee: Zahurul Alam

2 June 1963	PWD	1–1	Dacca Wanderers	Dacca, East Pakistan
	Manju 28'	Report	Patrick 55'	Stadium: Dacca Stadium; Referee: Munshi

2 June 1963	Police	1–1	Pakistan Eastern Railway	Dacca, East Pakistan
		Report	Bashir 20'	Stadium: Outer Stadium; Referee: Issa Khan

A charity match was held between league champions Victoria and a selected combined XI of the rest, in aid of cyclone victims, the charity match raised a total amount of Rs. 10,000.

5 June 1963	Victoria	1–0	Rest XI	Dacca, East Pakistan
	Yousuf Jr. 55'			Stadium: Dacca Stadium; Referee: Zahurul Alam

=== Teams ===
Victoria: Ghulam Hussain, Khuda Bakhsh, Lal Muhammad Khamisa, Hussain Killer, Murad Bakhsh, Abdul Ghafoor, Abdullah Jr., Yousuf Jr., Muhammad Umer, Ghulam Abbas Baloch, Yousuf Sr.

Rest XI: Abdul Hakim, Zahirul Haque, Amin Baloch, Abid Hussain Ghazi, Abdul Gafur Baloch, Mobasher, Aslam, Ghani, Qayyum Changezi, Bashir Ahmed, Moosa Ghazi

7 June 1963	Mohammedan Sporting	2–0	Pakistan Eastern Railway	Dacca, East Pakistan
	Ashraf 18'; Qayyum 62'	Report		Stadium: Dacca Stadium; Referee: Masudur Rahman

8 June 1963	Ispahani Club	1–0	Dacca Wanderers	Dacca, East Pakistan
	Protul 40'	Report		Stadium: Dacca Stadium; Referee: Zahurul Alam

9 June 1963	Mohammedan Sporting	6–0	Dacca Central Jail	Dacca, East Pakistan
	Shamsu 8', 14', 20', 29', 39'; Qayyum 24'	Report		Stadium: Dacca Stadium; Referee: Nani Bashak

10 June 1963	Pakistan Eastern Railway	2–0	Central Printing Stationary	Dacca, East Pakistan
	Mukul 15', 35'	Report		Stadium: Outer Stadium; Referee: Nazar Mohammad

11 June 1963	Dacca Wanderers	6–0	East Pakistan Rifles	Dacca, East Pakistan
	Amin; Aziz; Raymond 36'	Report		Stadium: Dacca Stadium; Referee: Nani Bashak

12 June 1963	Azad Sporting	2–2	Wari	Dacca, East Pakistan
	Samad 15', 33'	Report	Zaman 20'; Mukta 59'	Stadium: Dacca Stadium; Referee: Zahurul Alam

12 June 1963	Ispahani Club	2–1	EGP Press	Dacca, East Pakistan
	Nishith 3'; Dijesh 10'	Report	Salim 21'	Stadium: Dacca Stadium; Referee: Mohammad Ali

13 June 1963	Victoria	7–1	Pakistan Eastern Railway	Dacca, East Pakistan
	Yousuf Jr. 3', 8', 29'; Abbas 4', 21'; Jamal 18'; Umer 38'	Report	Mukul 59'	Stadium: Dacca Stadium; Referee: Rashid Chunna

13 June 1963	Central Printing Stationary	2–0	Dacca Central Jail	Dacca, East Pakistan
	Anil 22', 40'	Report		Stadium: Dacca Stadium; Referee: Mir Kabiruddin

14 June 1963	Mohammedan Sporting	1–0	Dacca Wanderers	Dacca, East Pakistan
	Qayyum 48'	Report		Stadium: Dacca Stadium; Attendance: 20,000; Referee: Zahurul Alam

14 June 1963	PWD	2–1	East Pakistan Rifles	Dacca, East Pakistan
	Aslam 3'; Nazir 46'	Report	Latif 43'	Stadium: Outer Stadium; Referee: Munir Hossain

15 June 1963	Wari	1–1	Ispahani Club	Dacca, East Pakistan
	Gias 13'	Report	Nishith 9'	Stadium: Dacca Stadium; Referee: Mani Bassak

15 June 1963	Azad Sporting	4–1	Dacca Central Jail	Dacca, East Pakistan
	Kamal 20'; Murree 45'; Mobasher 56'	Report	Matin 55'	Stadium: Outer Stadium; Referee: Zahurul Alam

16 June 1963	Victoria	6–0	Police	Dacca, East Pakistan
	Yousuf Sr. 18'; Abbas 24', 38'; Ghafoor 37'; Umer 53'; Hussain	Report		Stadium: Dacca Stadium; Referee: Masudur Rahman

16 June 1963	Central Printing Stationary	4–1	EGP Press	Dacca, East Pakistan
	Shuja 15', 50'; Janu 17'; Anil 20'	Report	Jalal 2'	Stadium: Outer Stadium; Referee: Osman Gani

17 June 1963	PWD	2–1	Mohammedan Sporting	Dacca, East Pakistan
	Saiful 17'; Nazir 50'	Report	Qayyum 25'	Stadium: Dacca Stadium; Referee: M. A. Hamza

17 June 1963	Wari	2–1	Pakistan Eastern Railway	Dacca, East Pakistan
	Amin; Mahmud	Report	Shankar	Stadium: Outer Stadium; Referee: Mohammad Ali

18 June 1963	Dacca Wanderers	5–0	Dacca Central Jail	Dacca, East Pakistan
	Sikander 2', 9'; Amin 8'; Hanif 29'; Mohsin 58'	Report		Stadium: Dacca Stadium; Referee: Rashid Chunna

18 June 1963	Ispahani Club	1–0	East Pakistan Rifles	Dacca, East Pakistan
	Nishith 3'	Report		Stadium: Outer Stadium; Referee: Munir Hossain

19 June 1963	Victoria	(Abandoned due to rain)	Azad Sporting	Dacca, East Pakistan
				Stadium: Dacca Stadium

20 June 1963	Dacca Wanderers	2–1	Wari	Dacca, East Pakistan
	Mohsin 2'; Sirisena 27'	Report	Samad 8'	Stadium: Dacca Stadium; Referee: Zahurul Alam

20 June 1963	Police	2–0	East Pakistan Rifles	Dacca, East Pakistan
	Latif 27'; Dhiren 29'	Report		Stadium: Outer Stadium; Referee: Mohammad Ali

21 June 1963	Central Printing Stationary	3–1	Ispahani Club	Dacca, East Pakistan
	Hossain Ali 4', 48'	Report		Stadium: Dacca Stadium; Referee: Masudur Rahman

22 June 1963	EGP Press	4–0	Dacca Central Jail	Dacca, East Pakistan
	Jalal 18', 50', 55'; Masum 33'	Report		Stadium: Outer Stadium; Referee: Nani Bashak

24 June 1963	Azad Sporting	2–1	Central Printing Stationary	Dacca, East Pakistan
	Mobasher 52'; Batu	Report	Shuja 18'	Stadium: Dacca Stadium; Referee: Munir Hossain

24 June 1963	PWD	2–1	Pakistan Eastern Railway	Dacca, East Pakistan
	Manju 15', 23'	Report	Bimal 20'	Stadium: Outer Stadium; Referee: Mohammad Ali

25 June 1963	East Pakistan Rifles	6–0	Dacca Central Jail	Dacca, East Pakistan
	Sagir 10', 56'; Anwar 22'; Kibria 48', 57'	Report		Stadium: Dacca Stadium; Referee: Moinuddin Chowdhury

26 June 1963	Dacca Wanderers	0–0	Police	Dacca, East Pakistan
		Report		Stadium: Dacca Stadium; Referee: Zahurul Alam

26 June 1963	PWD	1–1	Wari	Dacca, East Pakistan
	Imam 35'	Report	Faiz 43'	Stadium: Outer Stadium; Referee: Masudur Rahman

27 June 1963	Pakistan Eastern Railway	2–1	Ispahani Club	Dacca, East Pakistan
	Bashir 41'; Bimal 54'	Report	Nishith 14'	Stadium: Dacca Stadium; Referee: A. Hamza

28 June 1963	Police	1–0	PWD	Dacca, East Pakistan
	Sattar 2'	Report		Stadium: Dacca Stadium; Referee: Masudur Rahman

30 June 1963	Azad Sporting	2–0	Ispahani Club	Dacca, East Pakistan
	Murre 38', 55'	Report		Stadium: Dacca Stadium; Referee: Nani Bashak

1 July 1963	Police	0–0	Wari	Dacca, East Pakistan
		Report		Stadium: Dacca Stadium; Referee: Zahurul Alam

2 July 1963	PWD	2–0	EGP Press	Dacca, East Pakistan
	Aslam 41'; Faiz 52'	Report		Stadium: Dacca Stadium; Referee: Nazar Mohammad

4 July 1963	Victoria	4–0	Azad Sporting	Dacca, East Pakistan
	Abbas 21', 25'; Ghafoor 32' (pen.); Yousuf Jr. 59'	Report		Stadium: Dacca Stadium; Referee: M. A. Munshi

5 July 1963	Mohammedan Sporting	2–1	Ispahani Club	Dacca, East Pakistan
	Shamsu 1'; Kabir 48' (pen.)	Report	Samad 40'	Stadium: Dacca Stadium

5 July 1963	East Pakistan Rifles	1–1 (Abandoned)	EGP Press	Dacca, East Pakistan
		Report		Stadium: Outer Stadium

6 July 1963	Victoria	4–0	Wari	Dacca, East Pakistan
	Abbas 15'; Umer 34'; Yousuf Jr. 37'; Hussain	Report		Stadium: Dacca Stadium; Referee: Zahurul Alam

6 July 1963	Central Printing Stationary	1–1	PWD	Dacca, East Pakistan
	Fakir 6'	Report	Shuja 15'	Stadium: Outer Stadium; Referee: Nani Bashak

7 July 1963	Mohammedan Sporting	3–1	Azad Sporting	Dacca, East Pakistan
	Qayyum 5', 55'; Bashir 56'	Report	Muree 14'	Stadium: Dacca Stadium; Referee: Masudur Rahman

7 July 1963	Ispahani Club	5–0	Pakistan Eastern Railway	Dacca, East Pakistan
	Nishith 12'; Bishtoo 32'; Gada; Samad	Report		Stadium: Dacca Stadium; Referee: M. A. Hamza

8 July 1963	Victoria	3–1	Dacca Wanderers	Dacca, East Pakistan
	Yousuf Sr. 13'; Abbas 14'; Umer 36'	Newspaper report	Sirisena 29'	Stadium: Dacca Stadium; Referee: M. A. Munshi

8 July 1963	Central Printing Stationary	4–0	Wari	Dacca, East Pakistan
	Hossain Ali; Anil	Report		Stadium: Outer Stadium; Referee: Rashid Chunna

9 July 1963	Mohammedan Sporting	2–1	East Pakistan Rifles	Dacca, East Pakistan
	Bashir 2', 50'	Report	Latif 20'	Stadium: Dacca Stadium; Referee: M. A. Hamza

10 July 1963	Victoria	5–0	EGP Press	Dacca, East Pakistan
	Yousuf Sr. 11', 17'; Abdullah Jr. 36'; Abbas 45'; Ghafoor 51'	Report		Stadium: Dacca Stadium; Referee: Mohammad Ali

10 July 1963	Wari	2–0	East Pakistan Rifles	Dacca, East Pakistan
	Ali Imam 52', 57'	Report		Stadium: Outer Stadium; Referee: Nani Bashak

11 July 1963	Azad Sporting	2–1	Police	Dacca, East Pakistan
	Muree 29'; Kamal 34'	Report		Stadium: Dacca Stadium; Referee: Munir Hossain

12 July 1963	Victoria	1–0	Mohammedan Sporting	Dacca, East Pakistan
	Pintoo 24' (o.g.)	Report		Stadium: Dacca Stadium; Referee: Masudur Rahman

13 July 1963	PWD	1–0	EGP Press	Dacca, East Pakistan
	Lytton 1'	Report		Stadium: Dacca Stadium; Referee: Zahurul Alam

13 July 1963	East Pakistan Rifles	1–0	Central Printing Stationary	Dacca, East Pakistan
	Sagir 18'	Report		Stadium: Outer Stadium; Referee: M. A. Hamza

14 July 1963	Victoria	10–0	Dacca Central Jail	Dacca, East Pakistan
	Abbas 8', 11', 26'; Yousuf Jr. 28', 33'; Yousuf Sr.	Report		Stadium: Dacca Stadium; Referee: M. A. Hamza

15 July 1963	Dacca Wanderers	8–0	East Pakistan Rifles	Dacca, East Pakistan
	Sikander 1'; Hanif 29'; Ghani 35'; Aziz 39'	Report		Stadium: Dacca Stadium; Referee: Zahurul Alam

15 July 1963	Wari	3–0	Pakistan Eastern Railway	Dacca, East Pakistan
	Nazrul 10'; J. I. Das 29' (o.g.); Imam 45'	Report		Stadium: Outer Stadium; Referee: Nani Bashak

16 July 1963	Victoria	2–1	Central Printing Stationary	Dacca, East Pakistan
	Umer 14'; Abbas 40'	Report	Shuja 8'	Stadium: Dacca Stadium; Referee: Masudur Rahman

16 July 1963	PWD	4–0	Dacca Central Jail	Dacca, East Pakistan
	Saiful 35', 55'; Fakir 60'; Fakhru 63'	Report		Stadium: Outer Stadium; Referee: Shekih Shaheb Ali

17 July 1963	Mohammedan Sporting	5–0	Wari	Dacca, East Pakistan
	Qayyum 4', 10', 48', 54'; Rasool Bakhsh 46'	Report		Stadium: Dacca Stadium; Referee: M. A. Munshi

17 July 1963	Police	0–0	EGP Press	Dacca, East Pakistan
		Report		Stadium: Outer Stadium; Referee: M. A. Hamza

18 July 1963	Victoria	4–1	Ispahani Club	Dacca, East Pakistan
	Ghafoor 16'; Umer	Report	Nishith 52'	Stadium: Dacca Stadium; Referee: Zahurul Alam

18 July 1963	Pakistan Eastern Railway	2–0	East Pakistan Rifles	Dacca, East Pakistan
	Shanker 2', 45'	Report		Stadium: Outer Stadium

19 July 1963	Dacca Wanderers	5–1	Azad Sporting	Dacca, East Pakistan
	Raymond 14'; Aziz 25'; Sirisena; Hanif			Stadium: Dacca Stadium; Referee: Sheikh Shaheb Ali

20 July 1963	Mohammedan Sporting	5–1	EGP Press	Dacca, East Pakistan
	Qayyum 19', 48', 55'; Samad 42'; Pratap 47'	Report	Anil 16'	Stadium: Dacca Stadium; Referee: Nani Bashak

20 July 1963	Pakistan Eastern Railway	1–0	PWD	Dacca, East Pakistan
	Shanker 26'	Report		Stadium: Outer Stadium; Referee: Rashid Chunna

21 July 1963	Victoria	4–1	Police	Dacca, East Pakistan
	Umer 22'; Abbas 29', 42'; Yousuf Jr. 37'	Report	Nabi 15' (pen.)	Stadium: Dacca Stadium; Referee: Sheikh Shaheb Ali

21 July 1963	Ispahani Club	3–0	Dacca Central Jail	Dacca, East Pakistan
	Nishith 15', 20', 40'	Report		Stadium: Outer Stadium; Referee: Noor Hossain

22 July 1963	Mohammedan Sporting	3–2	Pakistan Eastern Railway	Dacca, East Pakistan
	Qayyum 8', 60'; Rasool Bakhsh 40'	Report	Bashir 24'; Macwa 55'	Stadium: Outer Stadium; Referee: Nawaz Alam

22 July 1963	Dacca Wanderers	2–0	Central Printing Stationary	Dacca, East Pakistan
	Aziz 56'; Sirisena 57'	Report		Stadium: Dacca Stadium; Referee: Zahurul Alam

23 July 1963	PWD	3–2	Azad Sporting	Dacca, East Pakistan
	Kanu 22' (pen.); Muree 27'; Fakir 46'	Report	Milal 4'; Manjur 41'	Stadium: Dacca Stadium; Referee: Nazar Mohammad

23 July 1963	Wari	3–0	EGP Press	Dacca, East Pakistan
	Imam 55', 57'; Tulu 59'	Report		Stadium: Outer Stadium; Referee: Mr. Hamid

24 July 1963	Pakistan Eastern Railway	2–2	Victoria	Dacca, East Pakistan
	Shanker 49', 56'	Report	Abbas 35', 38'	Stadium: Dacca Stadium; Referee: Munir Hossain

24 July 1963	Police	3–0	Central Printing Stationary	Dacca, East Pakistan
	Angoor; Nani; Gafur	Report		Stadium: Outer Stadium; Referee: Mohammad Ali

25 July 1963	Ispahani Club	0–0	Dacca Wanderers	Dacca, East Pakistan
		Report		Stadium: Dacca Stadium; Referee: M. A. Hamza

25 July 1963	Azad Sporting	2–1	East Pakistan Rifles	Dacca, East Pakistan
	Muree 20'; Batu 56'	Report	Sagir 10'	Stadium: Dacca Stadium; Referee: Rashid Chunna

26 July 1963	Victoria	4–2	PWD	Dacca, East Pakistan
	Ghafoor 10', 13'; Yousuf Jr. 15'; Yousuf Sr. 27'		Jalalabad 32'; Fakir 42'	Stadium: Inner Stadium; Referee: Shekih Shaheb Ali

27 July 1963	Mohammedan Sporting	7–1	Azad Sporting	Dacca, East Pakistan
	Bashir 14' 45'; Qayyum 38'; Rasool Bakhsh; Pratap	Report	Muree 51'	Stadium: Inner Stadium; Attendance: 1,000; Referee: Masudur Rahman

27 July 1963	Ispahani Club	1–1	EGP Press	Dacca, East Pakistan
	Samad 21'	Report	Abul 36'	Stadium: Outer Stadium

28 July 1963	Wari	2–1	Police	Dacca, East Pakistan
	Jamboo 36'; Mahmood 52'	Report	Sattar 12'	Stadium: Dacca Stadium; Referee: Zahurul Alam

29 July 1963	Dacca Wanderers	2–0	EGP Press	Dacca, East Pakistan
	Hanif 12'; Jamil Akhtar 60'	Report		Stadium: Inner Stadium; Referee: Zahurul Alam

29 July 1963	Ispahani Club	3–0	Central Printing Stationary	Dacca, East Pakistan
	Samad; Nishith; Bishtoo	Report		Stadium: Outer Stadium; Referee: Nawaz Alam

30 July 1963	Mohammedan Sporting	2–0	PWD	Dacca, East Pakistan
	Rahmatullah	Report		Stadium: Dacca Stadium; Referee: Sheikh Shaheb Ali

30 July 1963	Azad Sporting	4–0	Dacca Central Jail	Dacca, East Pakistan
	Zaman; Kamal; Shajal	Report		Stadium: Outer Stadium; Referee: Mohammad Ali

31 July 1963	Pakistan Eastern Railway	2–1	EGP Press	Dacca, East Pakistan
	Shanker 1', 46'	Report	Jalal 17'	Referee: Nani Bashak

1 August 1963	Mohammedan Sporting	4–1	Central Printing Stationary	Dacca, East Pakistan
	Kabir 24', 48'; Bashir 25'; Qayyum 29'	Report	Hossain Ali 55'	Stadium: Dacca Stadium; Referee: Zahurul Alam

1 August 1963	PWD	5–2	East Pakistan Rifles	Dacca, East Pakistan
	Saiful; Fakir; Lytton	Report	Latif; Jabbar	Stadium: Outer Stadium; Referee: Rashid Chunna

2 August 1963	Azad Sporting	3–0	Wari	Dacca, East Pakistan
	Zaman 2', 58'; Batu 35'	Report		Stadium: Dacca Stadium; Referee: Masudur Rahman

2 August 1963	Ispahani Club	1–1	East Pakistan Rifles	Dacca, East Pakistan
	Bistoo	Report	Jabbar	Stadium: Outer Stadium; Referee: Golam Hossain

3 August 1963	Dacca Wanderers	4–1	Police	Dacca, East Pakistan
	Sirisena 15', 45'; Ghani 58'	Report	Dhiren 30'	Stadium: Dacca Stadium; Referee: Issa Khan

3 August 1963	Pakistan Eastern Railway	2–2	Central Printing Stationary	Dacca, East Pakistan
	Bashir; Shanker	Report	Bazlu; Shuja	Stadium: Outer Stadium; Referee: Nawaz Alam

5 August 1963	Dacca Central Jail	0–0	EGP Press	Dacca, East Pakistan
		Report		Stadium: Dacca Stadium; Referee: Mohammad Ali

6 August 1963	Police	2–1	Ispahani Club	Dacca, East Pakistan
	Nani 21'; Dhiren 60'	Report	Bhola 41'	Stadium: Dacca Stadium; Referee: Zahurul Alam

7 August 1963	PWD	1–0	Dacca Wanderers	Dacca, East Pakistan
	Jalalabad 52'	Report		Stadium: Dacca Stadium

7 August 1963	Dacca Central Jail	2–1	Pakistan Eastern Railway	Dacca, East Pakistan
	Mantu 47', 51'	Report	Sukul 21'	Stadium: Outer Stadium; Referee: Nani Bashak

8 August 1963	Mohammedan Sporting	1–0	Police	Dacca, East Pakistan
	Pratap 37'	Report		Stadium: Dacca Stadium; Referee: Issa Khan

9 August 1963	Azad Sporting	2–1	Ispahani Club	Dacca, East Pakistan
	Hafiz 44'; Abul	Report	Samad 32'	Stadium: Dacca Stadium; Referee: M. A. Hamza

9 August 1963	Central Printing Stationary	2–0	EGP Press	Dacca, East Pakistan
	Shuja; Nimai	Report		Stadium: Outer Stadium; Referee: Nazar Mohammad

15 August 1963	Wari	3–1	Ispahani Club	Dacca, East Pakistan
	Samad 3'; Tulu 34', 41'	Report	Nishith 20'	Stadium: Dacca Stadium; Referee: Zahurul Alam

16 August 1963	Dacca Wanderers	4–0	Pakistan Eastern Railway	Dacca, East Pakistan
	Sikander 6'; Jamil 22', 46'; Moosa 36'	Report		Stadium: Dacca Stadium; Referee: M. A. Hamza

16 August 1963	Dacca Central Jail	1–0	Police	Dacca, East Pakistan
	Mahboob	Report		Stadium: Outer Stadium; Referee: Masudur Rahman

17 August 1963	PWD	3–0	Wari	Dacca, East Pakistan
	Fakir 3', 48' ? 43'	Report		Stadium: Dacca Stadium; Referee: M. A. Hamza

18 August 1963	Mohammedan Sporting	Walkover (Note: The game was awarded to Mohammedan as their opponents failed to arrive)	Ispahani Club	Dacca, East Pakistan
		Report

18 August 1963	Police	1–0	EGP Press	Dacca, East Pakistan
	Hafiz 60'	Report		Stadium: Dacca Stadium; Referee: M. A. Hamza

20 August 1963	Mohammedan Sporting	4–0	Dacca Central Jail	Dacca, East Pakistan
	Qayyum 36', 52'; Pratap 49'; Ansar 56'	Report		Stadium: Dacca Stadium; Referee: Rashid Chunna

20 August 1963	Police	Walkover (Note: The game was awarded to Police as their opponents failed to arrive)	Pakistan Eastern Railway	Dacca, East Pakistan
		Report

21 August 1963	Ispahani Club	2–0	PWD	Dacca, East Pakistan
	Nishith 40'; Samad 52'	Report		Stadium: Dacca Stadium; Referee: Nawaz Alam

21 August 1963	Azad Sporting	2–0	EGP Press	Dacca, East Pakistan
	Abul 25'; Morsehd 24'	Report		Stadium: Outer Stadium; Referee: Issa Khan

22 August 1963	Mohammedan Sporting	2–1	Dacca Wanderers	Dacca, East Pakistan
	Moosa 1'; Bashir 19'	Report	Sikander 44'	Stadium: Dacca Stadium; Referee: Sheikh Shaheb Ali

23 August 1963	Police	2–0	PWD	Dacca, East Pakistan
	Nabi 24', 38'	Report		Stadium: Dacca Stadium; Referee: Masudur Rahman

23 August 1963	Central Printing Stationary	Walkover (Note: The game was awarded to Central Printing Stationary as their opponents failed to arrive)	Dacca Central Jail	Dacca, East Pakistan
		Report		Stadium: Dacca Stadium

29 August 1963	Dacca Wanderers	3–0	Wari	Dacca, East Pakistan
	Sirisena 21', 55'; Jamil 48'	Report		Stadium: Dacca Stadium; Referee: K. M. Munshi

29 August 1963	Azad Sporting	2–1	Central Printing Stationary	Dacca, East Pakistan
	Shuja 20'; Faruque 40'	Report	Muree 24'	Stadium: Outer Stadium
