= 1962 Dhaka First Division Football League =

Dhaka First Division Football League
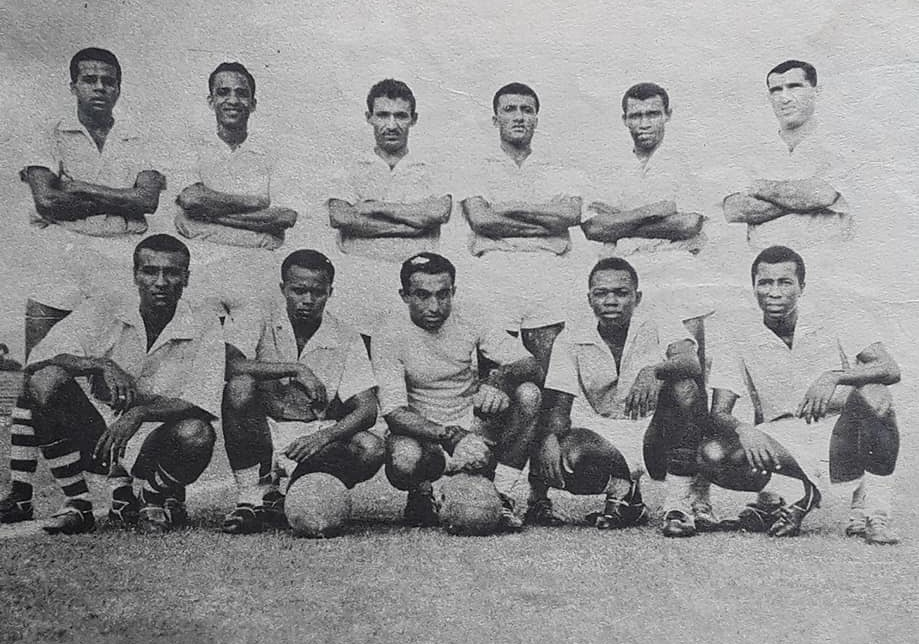
- Victoria line-up before a league match
- Season: 1962
- Dates: 5 May 1962 – 31 August 1962
- Teams: 13 (EPR withdrew)
- Champions: Victoria
- Relegated: Fire Service
- Top goalscorer: (Pakistan) Ghulam Abbas Baloch (38 goals)
- Longest winning run: 148
- Longest unbeaten run: 505

The 1962 Dhaka First Division Football League, was the 15th edition of the Dhaka First Division Football League following the partition of India. It was played from 5 May 1962 to 31 August 1962, with the matches being played at the Outer Stadium and the Dacca Stadium. The league was won by Victoria. Matches lasted 60 mins, with 5 mins rest.

East Pakistan Rifles were permitted to withdraw from the league after participating in 8 games.

== League table ==
Pos	Team	Pld	W	D	L	GF	GA	GD	Pts	Qualification or relegation
1	Victoria	23	22	1	0	119	13	+106	45	
2	Dacca Wanderers	22	16	3	3	42	18	+24	35	
3	Mohammedan	22	17	0	5	75	21	+54	34	
4	PWD	23	11	5	7	36	23	+13	27	
5	Ispahani Club	24	11	3	10	29	48	−19	25	
6	Azad	22	11	2	9	31	28	+3	24	
7	Police	22	6	6	10	26	41	−15	18	
8	EGP Press	23	6	4	13	22	40	−18	16	
9	Central Stationary	22	6	4	12	27	46	−19	16	
10	Wari	21	6	3	12	22	44	−22	15	
11	DC Mills	24	4	7	13	26	52	−26	15	
12	P.E. Railway	25	6	3	16	27	62	−35	15	
13	Fire Service	23	5	1	17	23	69	−46	11	Relegation to the 1963 Dhaka Second Division League

Source: Matches
Rules for classification: 1) Points; 2) Goal difference; 3) Goals scored;

== Matches ==
(Note: Matches not sourced from Pakistan Observer are sourced from The Morning News.)

5 May 1962	Ispahani Club	2–0	Azad Sporting	Dacca, East Pakistan
	Biren 37'; Gada 58'	Report		Referee: Zahurul Alam

5 May 1962	East Pakistan Rifles	1–1	EGP Press	Dacca, East Pakistan
	Sobhan 10'	Report	Jalal 16'	Stadium: Outer Stadium

6 May 1962	Victoria	1–0	PWD	Dacca, East Pakistan
	Abdullah 59'	Report		Stadium: Dacca Stadium; Referee: Ishaque

6 May 1962	Police	0–0	DC Mills	Dacca, East Pakistan
		Report		Stadium: Outer Stadium; Referee: Hamid

7 May 1962	Mohammedan Sporting	6–0	Pakistan Eastern Railway	Dacca, East Pakistan
	Ashraf 30'; Abid 27'; Samad 33'; Moosa; Muree	Report		Referee: Zahurul Alam

8 May 1962	Dacca Wanderers	1–0	Ispahani Club	Dacca, East Pakistan
	Mohsin 5'	Report		Stadium: Dacca Stadium; Referee: Issa Khan

8 May 1962	PWD	2–0	Fire Service	Dacca, East Pakistan
	Nazir; Faiz	Report		Stadium: Outer Stadium; Referee: M. A. Hamza

10 May 1962	Mohammedan Sporting	2–0	EGP Press	Dacca, East Pakistan
	Kabir 38'; Moosa 53'	Report		Stadium: Dacca Stadium; Referee: Zahurul Alam

10 May 1962	Central Printing Stationary	2–2	Wari	Dacca, East Pakistan
	Shuja 29'	Report	Samad; Hakim	Stadium: Outer Stadium

11 May 1962	Victoria	7–0	Pakistan Eastern Railway	Dacca, East Pakistan
	Abdullah 5', 40', 57'; Abbas 10'; Umer 30'; Yousuf Sr. 42'; Yousuf Jr. 43'	Report		Stadium: Dacca Stadium; Referee: M. A. Hamza

11 May 1962	Police	2–0	Fire Service	Dacca, East Pakistan
	Nabi 10'; Rouf 28'	Report		Stadium: Outer Stadium; Referee: Issa Khan

12 May 1962	Dacca Wanderers	2–0	PWD	Dacca, East Pakistan
	Yaqub 25'; Lari	Report		Stadium: Dacca Stadium; Referee: Sheikh Shaheb Ali

12 May 1962	Ispahani Club	1–0	East Pakistan Rifles	Dacca, East Pakistan
		Report		Stadium: Dacca Stadium

League matches were postponed due to celebration of Eid-Ul-Azha.

18 May 1962	Mohammedan Sporting	2–0	DC Mills	Dacca, East Pakistan
	Moosa 14', 15'	Report		Stadium: Dacca Stadium; Referee: Issa Khan

18 May 1962	Azad Sporting	2–0	EGP Press	Dacca, East Pakistan
	Nishith 4'	Report		Stadium: Outer Stadium; Referee: Sheikh Shaheb Ali

19 May 1962	Wari	4–2	Pakistan Eastern Railway	Dacca, East Pakistan
	Hakim 12', 40', 51'	Report	Shanker 50'; Sharfuddin 52'	Stadium: Outer Stadium

19 May 1962	Central Printing Stationary	3–0	Fire Service	Dacca, East Pakistan
	Ilyas 35', 48'; Badsha 52'	Report		Stadium: Dacca Stadium; Referee: M. A. Hamza

20 May 1962	Victoria	6–1	Pakistan Eastern Railway	Dacca, East Pakistan
	Abbas 18'; Ghafoor 22'; Abdullah 39', 47'; Umer 55'; Hussain 60'	Report	Saber 19' (pen.)	Stadium: Dacca Stadium; Referee: Shekih Shaheb Ali

20 May 1962	Ispahani Club	2–1	PWD	Dacca, East Pakistan
	? 15'; Rauf 20'	Report	Nazrul 42'	Stadium: Dacca Stadium; Referee: Issa Khan

21 May 1962	Azad Sporting	2–2	DC Mills	Dacca, East Pakistan
	Mukta 11'; Sharif 46'	Report	Salahuddin; Badrul 24'	Stadium: Dacca Stadium; Referee: Munir Hossain

21 May 1962	Dacca Wanderers	1–0	Police	Dacca, East Pakistan
	Rabbani 54'	Report		Stadium: Outer Stadium; Referee: Amir Hamza

22 May 1962	Mohammedan Sporting	3–0	Wari	Dacca, East Pakistan
	Moosa 12'; Kabir 32'; Muree 56'	Report		Stadium: Dacca Stadium; Referee: Issa Khan

22 May 1962	Central Printing Stationary	3–0	EGP Press	Dacca, East Pakistan
	Shuja 10'; Hossain Ali 50' ? 57'	Report		Stadium: Outer Stadium; Referee: Sheikh Shaheb Ali

23 May 1962	Victoria	8–1	Fire Service	Dacca, East Pakistan
	Abdullah 10'; Abbas 20', 32', 34'; Umer; Ghafoor	Report	Sarfuddin 33'	Stadium: Outer Stadium; Referee: Nani Bashak

23 May 1962	PWD	3–2	Police	Dacca, East Pakistan
	Manzoor 15', 41'; Saiful	Report	Sattar 32'; Dhiren 43'	Stadium: Dacca Stadium; Referee: M. A. Hamza

24 May 1962	Ispahani Club	1–1	Pakistan Eastern Railway	Dacca, East Pakistan
	Biren 40'	Report	Shankar 17'	Stadium: Dacca Stadium; Referee: Shekih Shaheb Ali

24 May 1962	EGP Press	2–1	DC Mills	Dacca, East Pakistan
	Shiraj 36'; Jalal 52'	Report	Shamsu 2'	Stadium: Outer Stadium; Referee: Ishaque

25 May 1962	Dacca Wanderers	2–2	Azad Sporting	Dacca, East Pakistan
	Shahjahan 9'; Gafur 22' (pen.)	Report	Jamil 20'; Nishith 27'	Stadium: Dacca Stadium; Referee: Issa Khan

25 May 1962	Wari	1–0	PWD	Dacca, East Pakistan
	Protul 55'	Report		Stadium: Outer Stadium; Referee: Sheikh Shaheb Ali

26 May 1962	Central Printing Stationary	1–0	East Pakistan Rifles	Dacca, East Pakistan
	Elias 33'	Report		Stadium: Outer Stadium; Referee: Muhammad Husain

26 May 1962	DC Mills	6–2	Fire Service	Dacca, East Pakistan
	Badrul 2'; Shamsu 15', 26', 39', 42'; Gias 34'	Report	Sharfuddin	Stadium: Dacca Stadium; Referee: Zahurul Alam

27 May 1962	Mohammedan Sporting	4–1 (Note: The goals were scored by Ashraf Chowdhury, not Muree, due to a printing mistake by the Pakistan Observer)	Police	Dacca, East Pakistan
	Ashraf 10', 26', 36', 52'	Report	Nabi 53' (pen.)	Stadium: Dacca Stadium; Referee: Zahurul Alam

27 May 1962	EGP Press	Walkover (Note: The game was awarded to Press as their opponents failed to arrive)	Pakistan Eastern Railway	Dacca, East Pakistan
		Report

28 May 1962	Victoria	7–1	Ispahani Club	Dacca, East Pakistan
	Yousuf Jr. 3'; Abdullah 9', 18', 23', 28'; Abbas 44'; Yousuf Sr. 52'	Report	Samad 13'	Stadium: Dacca Stadium; Referee: Ali

29 May 1962	Dacca Wanderers	2–1	EGP Press	Dacca, East Pakistan
	Yaqub 18'	Report	Shantu 15'	Stadium: Dacca Stadium; Referee: M. A. Munshi

30 May 1962	Pakistan Eastern Railway	2–0	DC Mills	Dacca, East Pakistan
	Mukul 33'; Shankar 54'			Stadium: Outer Stadium; Referee: Nazar Mohammad

30 May 1962	Mohammedan Sporting	3–0 (Abandoned)	East Pakistan Rifles	Dacca, East Pakistan
				Stadium: Dacca Stadium

31 May 1962	Wari	2–1	Police	Dacca, East Pakistan
	Mahmood 5', 54'	Report	Rouf 12'	Stadium: Dacca Stadium; Referee: Issa Khan

31 May 1962	Azad Sporting	1–0	Fire Service	Dacca, East Pakistan
	Batu 24'	Report		Stadium: Outer Stadium; Referee: Mohammad Ali

1 June 1962	Ispahani Club	1–1	EGP Press	Dacca, East Pakistan
	Arun 25'	Report	Jalal 2'	Stadium: Dacca Stadium; Referee: Nani Bashak

1 June 1962	Central Printing Stationary	2–0	PWD	Dacca, East Pakistan
	Shuja 24'	Report		Stadium: Outer Stadium; Referee: Issa Khan

2 June 1962	Azad Sporting	3–0	East Pakistan Rifles	Dacca, East Pakistan
	Shahjahan 35'; Abul; Batu 59'	Report		Stadium: Outer Stadium; Referee: Hamza

2 June 1962	Wari	3–1	Fire Service	Dacca, East Pakistan
	Hakim	Report	Sharfuddin 1'	Stadium: Dacca Stadium

3 June 1962	Victoria	8–1	Dacca Wanderers	Dacca, East Pakistan
	Yousuf Sr. 5'; Abbas 10', 17', 25', 32', 39'; Umer 52'; Abdullah 58'	Report	Yaqub 41'	Stadium: Dacca Stadium; Attendance: 20,000; Referee: Zahurul Alam

4 June 1962	Pakistan Eastern Railway	4–3	Police	Dacca, East Pakistan
	Shankar 13', 47'; Prokash 28'; Mukul 49'	Report	Rob 10'; Nabi 57'; Dhiren 59'	Stadium: Dacca Stadium; Referee: Sheikh Shaheb Ali

4 June 1962	DC Mills	0–0	Ispahani Club	Dacca, East Pakistan
		Report		Stadium: Outer Stadium; Referee: Mohammad

5 June 1962	Mohammedan Sporting	3–0	Fire Service	Dacca, East Pakistan
	Abid 17'; Rasool Bakhsh 35'; Muree 60'	Report		Stadium: Outer Stadium; Referee: M. A. Munshi

5 June 1962	PWD	4–0	EGP Press	Dacca, East Pakistan
	Shova 36', 58'; Nazir 42'; Jamboo 59'	Report		Stadium: Dacca Stadium; Referee: Nani Bashak

6 June 1962	Azad Sporting	4–0	Central Printing Stationary	Dacca, East Pakistan
	Shahjahan 5'; Abul 12'; Hafiz; Batu	Report		Stadium: Outer Stadium; Referee: Zahurul Alam

6 June 1962	Wari	1–1	East Pakistan Rifles	Dacca, East Pakistan
	Samad 59'	Report	Latif 21'	Stadium: Dacca Stadium; Referee: M. A. Munshi

7 June 1962	Victoria	2–2	Police	Dacca, East Pakistan
	Sultan 49'; Abbas 56'	Report	Nabi 2'; Akhtar 33'	Stadium: Dacca Stadium; Referee: Issa Khan

7 June 1962	Pakistan Eastern Railway	4–0	Fire Service	Dacca, East Pakistan
	? 18' (o.g.) ? 20', 50'; Shankar	Report		Stadium: Outer Stadium; Referee: Mohammad Ali

8 June 1962	Dacca Wanderers	3–0	DC Mills	Dacca, East Pakistan
	Jamil 24'; Patrick 58'	Report		Stadium: Dacca Stadium; Referee: Zahurul Alam

8 June 1962	Ispahani Club	1–0	Central Printing Stationary	Dacca, East Pakistan
	Anu 25'	Report		Stadium: Outer Stadium; Referee: Hamza

9 June 1962	Mohammedan Sporting	1–0	PWD	Dacca, East Pakistan
	Kabir 56'	Report		Stadium: Dacca Stadium; Referee: Sheikh Shaheb Ali

9 June 1962	Police	1–1	East Pakistan Rifles	Dacca, East Pakistan
	Hafiz 5'	Report	? 34' (o.g.)	Stadium: Dacca Stadium; Referee: Issa Khan

10 June 1962	Victoria	3–0	EGP Press	Dacca, East Pakistan
	Abbas 22'; Yousuf Sr. 25'; Ghafoor 46'	Report		Stadium: Dacca Stadium; Referee: Nani Bashak

10 June 1962	Ispahani Club	2–1	Wari	Dacca, East Pakistan
	Hakim 12'	Report	Biren; Arun 50'	Stadium: Outer Stadium; Referee: Zahurul Alam

11 June 1962	Dacca Wanderers	4–0	Fire Service	Dacca, East Pakistan
	Tulu 5'; Raymond 26', 28', 55'	Report		Stadium: Dacca Stadium; Referee: Munir Hossain

11 June 1962	Central Printing Stationary	3–3	DC Mills	Dacca, East Pakistan
	Taslim 2' ? ?	Report	Faruque; Punna; Badrul	Stadium: Outer Stadium

12 June 1962	Azad Sporting	3–1	Pakistan Eastern Railway	Dacca, East Pakistan
	Nishith 36', 41'; Abul 58'	Report	Shankar 27'	Stadium: Dacca Stadium

League was not held on Wednesday and Thursday due to Muharram.

15 June 1962	Dacca Wanderers	3–2	Mohammedan Sporting	Dacca, East Pakistan
	Yaqub 18'; Patrick 28', 41'	Report	Moosa 19', 51'	Stadium: Dacca Stadium; Referee: M. A. Munshi

16 June 1962	Victoria	6–0	Central Printing Stationary	Dacca, East Pakistan
	Hussain; Umer 24'; Abbas 33', 42', 49'; Yousuf Sr. 50'	Report		Stadium: Dacca Stadium; Referee: M. A. Munshi

16 June 1962	DC Mills	1–1	PWD	Dacca, East Pakistan
	Anil 47'	Report	Shamboo 45'	Stadium: Outer Stadium; Referee: Munir Hossain

17 June 1962	Dacca Wanderers	1–0	Wari	Dacca, East Pakistan
	Khokon 16' (o.g.)	Report		Stadium: Dacca Stadium; Referee: Nani Bashak

17 June 1962	East Pakistan Rifles	3–0	Pakistan Eastern Railway	Dacca, East Pakistan
	Saber; Sagir; Anwar 50'	Report		Stadium: Outer Stadium; Referee: Hamza

18 June 1962	Mohammedan Sporting	3–0	Central Printing Stationary	Dacca, East Pakistan
	Hussain 33'; Moosa 39', 47'	Report		Stadium: Dacca Stadium; Referee: Zahurul Alam

18 June 1962	EGP Press	0–0	Police	Dacca, East Pakistan
		Report		Stadium: Outer Stadium; Referee: Mohammad Ali

19 June 1962	DC Mills	1–0	Wari	Dacca, East Pakistan
	Kabel 60'	Report		Stadium: Dacca Stadium; Referee: Nazar Mohammad

19 June 1962	Azad Sporting	Cancelled	PWD	Dacca, East Pakistan
		Report

20 June 1962	Victoria	3–0	Azad Sporting	Dacca, East Pakistan
	Yousuf Sr. 17'; Abbas 47'; Ghafoor 49'	Report		Stadium: Dacca Stadium; Referee: Zahurul Alam

20 June 1962	Fire Service	1–1	East Pakistan Rifles	Dacca, East Pakistan
	Sharfuddin 4'	Report	Jabbar	Stadium: Outer Stadium; Referee: Moinuddin Chowdhury

21 June 1962	Dacca Wanderers	1–0	Central Printing Stationary	Dacca, East Pakistan
	Jamil 55'	Report		Stadium: Dacca Stadium; Referee: M. A. Hamza

21 June 1962	PWD	1–0	Pakistan Eastern Railway	Dacca, East Pakistan
	? 28'	Report		Stadium: Outer Stadium; Referee: Nazar Mohammad

22 June 1962	Victoria	4–1	DC Mills	Dacca, East Pakistan
	Umer 6', 25'; Ghafoor 7'; Yousuf Jr. 34'	Report	Lytton 48'	Stadium: Dacca Stadium; Referee: Issa Khan

22 June 1962	Ispahani Club	3–2	Fire Service	Dacca, East Pakistan
	Gadadher 15', 16'; Biren 48'	Report	Munir 27'	Stadium: Outer Stadium; Referee: Zahurul Alam

23 June 1962	Pakistan Eastern Railway	2–0	EGP Press	Dacca, East Pakistan
	? 4' ? 54'	Report		Stadium: Dacca Stadium; Referee: Nani Bashak

24 June 1962	Dacca Wanderers	1–1 (Abandoned)	East Pakistan Rifles	Dacca, East Pakistan
	Yaqub 5'	Report	Jabbar 7'	Stadium: Dacca Stadium

24 June 1962	Police	0–0	Central Printing Stationary	Dacca, East Pakistan
		Report		Stadium: Outer Stadium; Referee: Mohammad Ali

25 June 1962	Victoria	5–0	Mohammedan Sporting	Dacca, East Pakistan
	Ghafoor 5'; Yousuf Jr. 6', 40'; Abbas 45'; Umer 52'	Report		Stadium: Dacca Stadium; Attendance: 35,000; Referee: Zahurul Alam

26 June 1962	Police	2–0	Azad Sporting	Dacca, East Pakistan
	Dhiren 9'; Angoor 35'	Report		Stadium: Dacca Stadium; Referee: M. A. Hamza

26 June 1962	EGP Press	2–1	Fire Service	Dacca, East Pakistan
	Malik 13', 33'	Report	Munir 5'	Stadium: Outer Stadium; Referee: Munir Hossain

27 June 1962	Mohammedan Sporting	3–1	Ispahani Club	Dacca, East Pakistan
	Ansar 8', 10'; Muree 48'	Report	Samad 17'	Stadium: Dacca Stadium; Referee: Zahurul Alam

The East Pakistan Rifles and PWD has currently not been found.

28 June 1962	Dacca Wanderers	2–1	Pakistan Eastern Railway	Dacca, East Pakistan
	Raymond 17'; Jamil Akhtar	Report	Khaiz	Stadium: Dacca Stadium; Referee: M. A. Hamza

29 June 1962	Police	2–0	Ispahani Club	Dacca, East Pakistan
	Dhiren 15'; Tapan 46' (o.g.)	Report		Stadium: Dacca Stadium; Referee: Zahurul Alam

30 June 1962	PWD	1–0	Azad Sporting	Dacca, East Pakistan
	Jamboo 40'	Report		Stadium: Dacca Stadium; Referee: M. A. Munshi

1 July 1962	Victoria	3–1	Wari	Dacca, East Pakistan
	Yousuf Sr. 2'; Umer 6'; Abbas 45'	Report	Samad 18'	Stadium: Dacca Stadium; Referee: Issa Khan

Mohammedan Sporting and East Pakistan Rifles match report has currently not been found.

2 July 1962	DC Mills	2–1	Pakistan Eastern Railway	Dacca, East Pakistan
	Gias 22'; Badal 58'	Report	Shafiq 26'	Stadium: Dacca Stadium; Referee: Nani Bashak

4 July 1962	Mohammedan Sporting	1–0	Azad Sporting	Dacca, East Pakistan
	Moosa 24'	Report		Stadium: Dacca Stadium; Referee: M. A. Hamza

5 July 1962	Dacca Wanderers	4–1	EGP Press	Dacca, East Pakistan
	Rabbani 5'; Yaqub 13', 56'; Gafur 36' (pen.)	Report	Jalal	Stadium: Dacca Stadium; Referee: Zahurul Alam

6 July 1962	Victoria	10–0	DC Mills	Dacca, East Pakistan
	Abbas 1', 41'; Umer; Abdullah 46', 48'; Ghafoor			Stadium: Dacca Stadium; Referee: M. A. Hamza

6 July 1962	Fire Service	3–1	Pakistan Eastern Railway	Dacca, East Pakistan
	Rahim 18'; Mizan 43'		Ash Muhammad 50'	Stadium: Outer Stadium; Referee: Munir Hossain

7 July 1962	Mohammedan Sporting	4–1	Police	Dacca, East Pakistan
	Aboojan 2', 20', 44'; Moosa 49'	Report	Nabi 48' (pen.)	Stadium: Dacca Stadium; Referee: M. A. Munshi

7 July 1962	Wari	2–0	EGP Press	Dacca, East Pakistan
	Protul 14' ? 36'	Report		Stadium: Outer Stadium

8 July 1962	Azad Sporting	1–0	Central Printing Stationary	Dacca, East Pakistan
	Hafiz 29'	Report		Stadium: Dacca Stadium; Referee: Issa Khan

9 July 1962	PWD	6–1	Ispahani Club	Dacca, East Pakistan
	Saiful 5'; Jamboo 11', 17', 33'; Nazrul 44'; Shova 50'	Report	Rouf 54'	Stadium: Dacca Stadium; Referee: M. A. Hamza

10 July 1962	Dacca Wanderers	0–0	Pakistan Eastern Railway	Dacca, East Pakistan
		Report		Stadium: Dacca Stadium; Referee: Zahurul Alam

10 July 1962	Azad Sporting	1–0	EGP Press	Dacca, East Pakistan
	Abul 47'	Report		Stadium: Outer Stadium; Referee: Nazar Mohammad

11 July 1962	PWD	2–0	Pakistan Eastern Railway	Dacca, East Pakistan
	Zamboo 5'; Shova 47'	Report		Stadium: Outer Stadium; Referee: Munir Hossain

12 July 1962	Mohammedan Sporting	6–0	Fire Service	Dacca, East Pakistan
	Aboojan; Ansar 9'; Abid 27'	Report		Stadium: Dacca Stadium; Referee: Zahurul Alam

12 July 1962	Ispahani Club	2–1	Central Printing Stationary	Dacca, East Pakistan
	Samad 23'; Sunil 36'	Report	Eugene 59'	Stadium: Outer Stadium

13 July 1962	Dacca Wanderers	3–0	Police	Dacca, East Pakistan
	Yaqub 13', 39'; Aziz	Report		Stadium: Dacca Stadium; Referee: M. A. Munshi

13 July 1962	Wari	1–0	DC Mills	Dacca, East Pakistan
	Arun 46'	Report		Stadium: Outer Stadium; Referee: Nani Bashak

14 July 1962	Central Printing Stationary	3–1	Fire Service	Dacca, East Pakistan
	Hossain Ali 5'; Shuja 15'	Report	?	Stadium: Outer Stadium; Referee: A. Hamid

15 July 1962	PWD	2–1	Mohammedan Sporting	Dacca, East Pakistan
	Nazir 5'; Faiz 39'	Report	Kabir 45' (pen.)	Stadium: Dacca Stadium; Referee: Zahurul Alam

15 July 1962	EGP Press	6–1	Ispahani Club	Dacca, East Pakistan
	Jalal 15', 25', 40'; Shantu 50'; Rashid 55'	Report	Anu 59'	Stadium: Outer Stadium; Referee: M. A. Hamza

16 July 1962	Dacca Wanderers	0–0	Wari	Dacca, East Pakistan
		Report		Stadium: Dacca Stadium; Referee: Issa Khan

16 July 1962	Azad Sporting	2–0	DC Mills	Dacca, East Pakistan
	? 10'	Report		Stadium: Outer Stadium; Referee: M. A. Munshi

17 July 1962	Victoria	8–1	Fire Service	Dacca, East Pakistan
	Abbas 2'; Umer 5', 29', 58'; Abdullah 25', 27'; Ghafoor 28'; Yousuf Sr. 57'	Report	Moni 32' (pen.)	Stadium: Dacca Stadium; Referee: M. A. Munshi

17 July 1862	Police	2–1	Central Printing Stationary	Dacca, East Pakistan
	Angoor 4'; Kafil 15'	Report	Kabir	Stadium: Outer Stadium; Referee: A. Hamid

18 July 1962	Mohammedan Sporting	3–0	EGP Press	Dacca, East Pakistan
	Ansar 2'; Ashraf; Moosa 55'	Report		Stadium: Dacca Stadium; Referee: M. A. Hamza

18 July 1962	Ispahani Club	1–0	Pakistan Eastern Railway	Dacca, East Pakistan
	Bishtoo 5'	Report		Stadium: Outer Stadium; Referee: Zahurul Alam

19 July 1962	PWD	3–1	Azad Sporting	Dacca, East Pakistan
	Jamboo 18', 26'; Shova 20'	Report	Nishith 28'	Stadium: Dacca Stadium; Referee: Issa Khan

19 July 1962	Pakistan Eastern Railway	1–1	Wari	Dacca, East Pakistan
	Shankar 12'	Report	Salam 46'	Stadium: Dacca Stadium; Referee: Nani Bashak

20 July 1962	Police	1–0	Ispahani Club	Dacca, East Pakistan
	Nabi 10' (pen.)	Report		Stadium: Outer Stadium; Referee: Nazar Mohammad

23 July 1962	PWD	1–1	DC Mills	Dacca, East Pakistan
	Sadeque 16' (o.g.)	Report	Manju	Stadium: Dacca Stadium; Referee: M. A. Hamid

24 July 1962	Victoria	6–0	Police	Dacca, East Pakistan
	Umer 7', 32', 37'; Abbas 42', 44', 58'	Report		Stadium: Dacca Stadium; Referee: Zahurul Alam

24 July 1962	Fire Service	2–0	EGP Press	Dacca, East Pakistan
	Rahim 48'	Report	Sharfuddin	Stadium: Outer Stadium; Referee: Nani Bashak

25 July 1962	Mohammedan Sporting	8–1	Wari	Dacca, East Pakistan
	Aboojan 11', 38', 44'; Muree 20', 55'; Abid 37', 53'; Kabir 47'	Report	Samad 36'	Stadium: Dacca Stadium; Referee: M. A. Munshi

25 July 1962	Central Printing Stationary	3–0	Pakistan Eastern Railway	Dacca, East Pakistan
	Elias 17'; Kabir 19'; Kashem 45'	Report		Stadium: Outer Stadium

26 July 1962	Dacca Wanderers	5–0	Fire Service	Dacca, East Pakistan
	Jamil 48'; Patrick 22'; Raymond 30'; Yaqub 59'	Report		Stadium: Dacca Stadium; Referee: M. A. Munshi

26 July 1962	Azad Sporting	5–0	Pakistan Eastern Railway	Dacca, East Pakistan
	Hafiz 5'; Shahjahan; Nishith 47'	Report		Stadium: Outer Stadium; Referee: Nazar Mohammad

27 July 1962	Victoria	1–0	PWD	Dacca, East Pakistan
	Umer 52'	Report		Stadium: Dacca Stadium; Referee: Zahurul Alam

28 July 1962	Ispahani Club	2–1	DC Mills	Dacca, East Pakistan
	Biren 5'; Samad 10'	Report	Badrul 55'	Stadium: Outer Stadium

28 July 1962	Azad Sporting	3–0	Police	Dacca, East Pakistan
	Nishith; Zaman	Report		Stadium: Dacca Stadium; Referee: Issa Khan

Mohammedan Sporting and Dacca Wanderers match was postponed by the EPSF.

31 July 1962	Azad Sporting	2–1	Ispahani Club	Dacca, East Pakistan
	Nishith 5'; Mantu 40'	Report	Bishtoo	Stadium: Dacca Stadium; Referee: M. A. Munshi

31 July 1962	Fire Service	1–1	PWD	Dacca, East Pakistan
	Mannan 49'	Report	Mannan 11'	Stadium: Outer Stadium; Referee: Zahurul Alam

1 August 1962	DC Mills	2–1	Mohammedan Sporting	Dacca, East Pakistan
	Pabirtha; Govinda 25'		Abid 59'	Stadium: Dacca Stadium; Referee: Afzal

1 August 1962	Pakistan Eastern Railway	2–0	Police	Dacca, East Pakistan
	Mukul; Shankar			Stadium: Outer Stadium; Referee: Nazar Mohammad

2 August 1962	Fire Service	2–0	Wari	Dacca, East Pakistan
	Rahim; Nantu		Mujibar	Stadium: Outer Stadium; Referee: Nani Bashak

2 August 1962	Dacca Wanderers	2–0	Central Printing Stationary	Dacca, East Pakistan
	Yaqub; Raymond			Stadium: Dacca Stadium

3 August 1962	Victoria	5–0	Azad Sporting	Dacca, East Pakistan
	Umer 18', 43'; Mantu (o.g.); Yousuf Jr. 38'; Abbas 45'			Stadium: Dacca Stadium; Referee: Issa Khan

3 August 1962	EGP Press	1–1	DC Mills	Dacca, East Pakistan
	Jalal 33'	Report	Pijsuh 14'	Stadium: Outer Stadium; Referee: Zahurul Alam

4 August 1962	Mohammedan Sporting	9–0	Pakistan Eastern Railway	Dacca, East Pakistan
	Aboojan; Abid; Moosa; Muree			Stadium: Dacca Stadium; Referee: A. Hamza

4 August 1962	Ispahani Club	3–2	Wari	Dacca, East Pakistan
	Bistoo; Biren		Nasir	Stadium: Outer Stadium

5 August 1962	Victoria	2–1	Dacca Wanderers	Dacca, East Pakistan
	Ghafoor 27'; Abdullah 40'	Report	Patrick 13'	Stadium: Dacca Stadium; Referee: M. A. Munshi

6 August 1962	PWD	3–3	Police	Dacca, East Pakistan
	Jamboo 11', 40'; Saiful 42'	Report	Nabi 49', 52' (pen.), 59'	Stadium: Dacca Stadium; Referee: Zahurul Alam

6 August 1962	EGP Press	3–1	Central Printing Stationary	Dacca, East Pakistan
	Shamsu 15', 33'; Abul 20'	Report	Anwar	Stadium: Outer Stadium; Referee: M. A. Hamza

7 August 1962	Pakistan Eastern Railway	4–1	DC Mills	Dacca, East Pakistan
	Gias 26'; Mukul 42', 50', 59'	Report	Shanker 35'	Stadium: Dacca Stadium; Referee: Issa Khan

8 August 1962	Victoria	5–2	Mohammedan Sporting	Dacca, East Pakistan
	Abbas 10'; Abdullah 21', 44', 55'; Umer 33'	Report	Ashraf 47'; Muree 59'	Stadium: Dacca Stadium; Attendance: 40,000; Referee: Sheikh Shaheb Ali

16 August 1962	Victoria	9–0	Wari	Dacca, East Pakistan
	Abbas; Umer 26'; Yousuf Sr. Yousuf Jr.	Report		Stadium: Dacca Stadium; Referee: M. A. Munshi

16 August 1962	Central Printing Stationary	3–1	DC Mills	Dacca, East Pakistan
	Ajab Ali 5'; Shuja 15'; Elias 59'	Report	Badal 50'	Stadium: Dacca Stadium; Referee: Nazar Mohammad

17 August 1962	Ispahani Club	2–1	Fire Service	Dacca, East Pakistan
	Halim; Bishtoo	Report	Sharfuddin 57'	Stadium: Dacca Stadium; Referee: M. A. Hamza

18 August 1962	Mohammedan Sporting	6–0	Central Printing Stationary	Dacca, East Pakistan
	Aboojan 12', 34'; Moosa 15'; Muree 24', 32'; Kabir 26'	Report	Shuja; Abu	Stadium: Dacca Stadium; Referee: Issa Khan

18 August 1962	Police	1–0	Wari	Dacca, East Pakistan
	Akhtar 6'	Report		Stadium: Outer Stadium; Referee: Munir Hossain

19 August 1962	Dacca Wanderers	3–0	Azad Sporting	Dacca, East Pakistan
	Akhtar 10', 59'; Mantu 15' (o.g.)	Report		Stadium: Dacca Stadium; Referee: Nazar Mohammad

19 August 1962	Fire Service	4–2	DC Mills	Dacca, East Pakistan
	Amalesh 5'; Sharfuddin 32', 34'	Report	Binu 23', 59'	Stadium: Outer Stadium

Matches abandoned due to heavy rain.

21 August 1962	Azad Sporting	2–1	Wari	Dacca, East Pakistan
	Nishith		Pratul	Stadium: Dacca Stadium

22 August 1962	EGP Press	2–0	Pakistan Eastern Railway	Dacca, East Pakistan
	Jalal 42', 54'			Stadium: Outer Stadium

22 August 1962	Central Printing Stationary	2–2	PWD	Dacca, East Pakistan
	Eugene; Aziz		Saiful; Shova	Stadium: Dacca Stadium

23 August 1962	Dacca Wanderers	1–0	DC Mills	Dacca, East Pakistan
	Gafur 52'	Report		Stadium: Dacca Stadium

23 August 1962	Fire Service	1–0	Azad Sporting	Dacca, East Pakistan
		Report		Stadium: Outer Stadium

24 August 1962	Victoria	6–0	Central Printing Stationary	Dacca, East Pakistan
	Abbas; Umer; Ghafoor	Report		Stadium: Dacca Stadium; Referee: Zahurul Alam

26 August 1962	Police	3–3	EGP Press	Dacca, East Pakistan
	Dhiren 18'; Sattar 21'; Hafiz 35'		Jalal 39', 40', 45'	Stadium: Dacca Stadium; Referee: Nazar Mohammad

27 August 1962	Victoria	4–1	Ispahani Club	Dacca, East Pakistan
	Yousuf Sr. Umer; Abbas	Report	Samad	Stadium: Dacca Stadium; Referee: M. A. Hamza

28 August 1962	PWD	2–0	Wari	Dacca, East Pakistan
	Shova 1'; Faiz 17'	Report		Stadium: Dacca Stadium; Referee: Issa Khan

29 August 1962	Ispahani Club	1–0	Dacca Wanderers	Dacca, East Pakistan
	Samad 32'	Report		Stadium: Dacca Stadium

30 August 1962	PWD	1–0	EGP Press	Dacca, East Pakistan
	Nazrul 50'	Report		Stadium: Dacca Stadium; Referee: Nazar Mohammad

31 August 1962	Mohammedan Sporting	5–0	Ispahani Club	Dacca, East Pakistan
	Aboojan; Rasool Bakhsh; Ansar; Kabir; Muree	Report		Stadium: Dacca Stadium; Referee: M. A. Hamza
