= 1962 Aga Khan Gold Cup =

- Muhammad Umer (left), receiving the Aga Khan Gold Cup trophy from Tunku Abdul Rahman.

Tournament details
- Host country: East Pakistan (now Bangladesh)
- Dates: 27 September – 20 October 1962
- Teams: 19 (from 1 confederation)
- Venue: Dacca Stadium (in Dhaka host cities)

Final positions
- Champions: (Pakistan) Victoria (1st title)

Tournament statistics
- Matches played: 20
- Goals scored: 102 (5.1 per match)
- Top scorer: (Pakistan) Muhammad Umer (12 goals)

The 1962 Aga Khan Gold Cup was the fifth edition of the Aga Khan Gold Cup. The tournament was organized by the East Pakistan Sports Federation (EPSF) and all games were held at the Dhaka Stadium in Dhaka, East Pakistan (now Bangladesh), from 27 September 1962 to 20 October 1962. The matches lasted 70 minutes.

== Venues ==
Dhaka
Dhaka Stadium
Capacity: 25,000
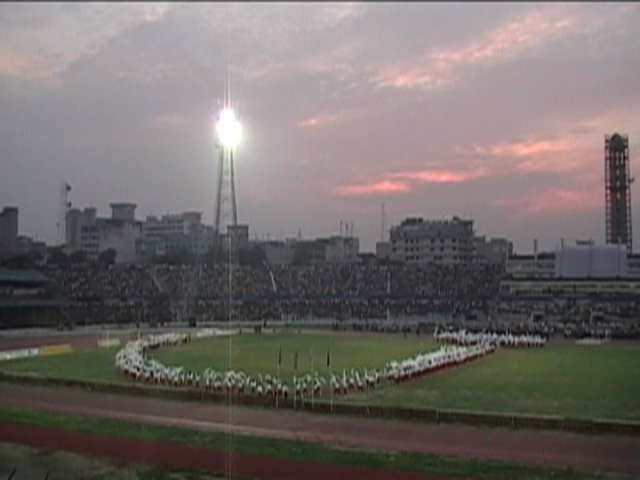

== First phase ==
27 September 1962

Fire Service (Pakistan)	1–0	(Pakistan) EPG Press
Hakim 50'	Report

Dhaka Stadium, Dhaka
Referee: M.A. Hamza (Pakistan)

28 September 1962

Dinajpur DC's XI (Pakistan)	0–0	(Pakistan) Police
	Report

Dhaka Stadium, Dhaka
Referee: Zahurul Alam (Pakistan)

Replay

3 October 1962

Dinajpur DC's XI (Pakistan)	3–1	(Pakistan) Police
N/A 10'; Mohsin 45'; Shamsu 60'	Report	Akhter 14'

Dhaka Stadium, Dhaka
Referee: Zahurul Alam (Pakistan)

29 September 1962

Victoria (Pakistan)	9–0	(Pakistan) Dacca University
Yousuf Sr. 8', 38' (?); Abbas 15'; Abdullah 45'; Umer 48' (?)	Report

Dhaka Stadium, Dhaka
Referee: Issa Khan (Pakistan)

30 September 1962

Mohammedan Sporting (Pakistan)	Abandoned (Note: Game abandoned after 15 minutes due to heavy rain and poor lighting at the Dhaka Stadium.)	Pakistan Eastern Railway
	Report

Dhaka Stadium, Dhaka

Replay

4 October 1962

Mohammedan Sporting (Pakistan)	7–0	Pakistan Eastern Railway
Moosa 15', 18', 40'; Rasool Bakhsh; Yaqub 49', 51'; Aboojan	Report

Dhaka Stadium, Dhaka
Referee: Issa Khan (Pakistan)

1 October 1962

Chittagong Port Trust (Pakistan)	2–2	(Pakistan) PWD SC
Chakma 32', 62'	Report	Manzur 59'; Jamboo 67'

Dhaka Stadium, Dhaka
Referee: Zahurul Alam (Pakistan)

Replay

3 October 1962

Chittagong Port Trust (Pakistan)	0–1	(Pakistan) PWD SC
	Report	Nazrul

Dhaka Stadium, Dhaka
Referee: Sheikh Shaheb Ali (Pakistan)

Byes to the second phase: Young Taegeuk FA, Bandung FA, Azad SC, Baloch Eleven, Dhaka Central Jail, Ceylon FA XI, Pakistan Airlines and Central Printing Press.

== Second phase ==
5 October 1962

Young Taegeuk (South Korea)	4–2	(Pakistan) PWD SC
Kuk-chan Lim 12', 16' (?); Lee Yi-woo 34'	Report	Shova 51'; Jamboo

Dhaka Stadium, Dhaka
Referee: M.A. Munshi (Pakistan)

6 October 1962

Bandung FA (Indonesia)	5–0	(Pakistan) Azad SC
Ismail 10'; Rukmon 11'; Witersu 50'; Djadjang 53'; Suratmo 58'	Report

Dhaka Stadium, Dhaka
Referee: M.A. Munshi (Pakistan)

9 October 1962

Pakistan Western Railway	3–0	(Pakistan) Dinajpur DC's XI
Rashid 10'; Ghani 20'; Jehan	Report

Dhaka Stadium, Dhaka
Referee: Zahurul Alam (Pakistan)

10 October 1962

Baloch Eleven (Pakistan)	1–3	(Pakistan) Victoria
Mehrab	Report	Yousuf Sr. 15'; Umer 32'; Abdullah 55'

Dhaka Stadium, Dhaka
Referee: Sheikh Shaheb Ali (Pakistan)

11 October 1962

Ceylon FA XI	9–1	(Pakistan) Dhaka Central Jail
Zainulabdeen 18' (?), 61', 64'; Sirisena 32'; T.H. Kurulasooriya 37', 67'; S.K. Kasinathan 54'; E. Wickremasooriya 59'	Report	Ghazi 7'

Dhaka Stadium, Dhaka
Referee: Issa Khan (Pakistan)

12 October 1962

Pakistan Airlines	8–4	(Pakistan) Central Printing Press
Nazar 10', 11' (?); Majid; Mahmood; Changez	Report	Shuja 8' (?); Milan

Dhaka Stadium, Dhaka
Referee: M.A. Munshi (Pakistan)
- Dhaka Mohammedan and Fire Service AC both received byes to the quarter-finals after their respective opponents, Pakistan Moghuls and Keamari Muhammadan, were unable to participate in the tournament.

== Quarter-finals ==
12 October 1962

Young Taegeuk (South Korea)	5–0	(Pakistan) Fire Service
Lee Yi-woo 11', 56'; Cho Ke Taik 57', 69'; Kim Young-bae 58'	Report

Dhaka Stadium, Dhaka
Referee: Zahurul Alam (Pakistan)

13 October 1962

Bandung FA (Indonesia)	0–2	Pakistan Western Railway
	Report	Jehan 29', 41'

Dhaka Stadium, Dhaka
Referee: Sheikh Shaheb Ali (Pakistan)

14 October 1962

Victoria (Pakistan)	7–1	Ceylon FA XI
Umer 11' (?), 46'; Yousuf Sr. 30'; Abbas; Ghafoor	Report	Aluvihare 18'

Dhaka Stadium, Dhaka
Attendance: 20,000
Referee: M.A. Munshi (Pakistan)

15 October 1962

Mohammedan Sporting (Pakistan)	2–2	Pakistan Airlines
Moosa	Report	Changez 19'; Majid 53'

Dhaka Stadium, Dhaka
Referee: M.A. Hamza (Pakistan)

Replay

17 October 1962

Mohammedan Sporting (Pakistan)	Abandoned (Note: Mohammedan refused to play extra time without Moosa Ghazi, who had been sent off during regular time. A minute after extra time began, Moosa re-entered the field. When the referee, M.A. Hamza, asked him to leave, Mohammedan refused to continue the match. Later that day, the tournament committee awarded the match to Pakistan Airlines while the East Pakistan Sports Federation imposed a six-month suspension on Moosa.) (0–0) (a.e.t.)	Pakistan Airlines
	Report

Dhaka Stadium, Dhaka
Referee: M.A. Hamza (Pakistan)

== Semi-finals ==
16 October 1962

Victoria (Pakistan)	Abandoned (Note: Game abandoned 5 minutes before full-time at 3–2 due to poor lighting. Notably, the game started at 4:36pm instead of 4:00 pm as the East Pakistan Sports Federation failed to provide Pakistan Western Railway transport to Dhaka Stadium.) (3–2)	Pakistan Western Railway
Umer 9', 10'; Abbas 51'	Report	Jehan 14', 42'

Dhaka Stadium, Dhaka
Referee: M.A. Munshi (Pakistan)

Replay

18 October 1962

Victoria (Pakistan)	5–1	Pakistan Western Railway
Yousuf Sr. 20'; Ghafoor 30' (pen.); Umer 45', 54', 62'	Report	Jehan 18'

Dhaka Stadium, Dhaka
Referee: Zahurul Alam (Pakistan)

19 October 1962

Young Taegeuk (South Korea)	4–1	Pakistan Airlines
Chun Kang-moon 4'; Kuk-chan Lim 8', 12'; Lee Yi-woo	Report	Saeed 17'

Dhaka Stadium, Dhaka
Referee: Sheikh Shaheb Ali (Pakistan)

== Final ==
=== Match ===
Abdul Ghafoor's free-kick goal, where Yang Woo-Sik, Korea's goalkeeper, tried to save.

The 1962 Aga Khan Gold Cup final took place on 20 October, the final which was held at the Dhaka Stadium, between Victoria and Young Taegeuk, which was South Korea's youth representative for the tournament.

The match kicked off on a fast note with Muhammad Umer opening the scoring in the 3rd minute of the game. Immediately afterwards, Victoria were awarded a free-kick, taken by Abdul Ghafoor, found the back of the net with a powerful right foot strike. Leading by 2–0, Victoria continued to press, finding key passes movements through their forwards. The opposition also made attacking plays every once in a while, as in the 10th minute, centre-forward Lee Yi-woo tried to connect the ball to the goal, but failed.

In the 23rd minute, the Korean team managed to reduce the margin through Lee Yi-woo, made possible through a left flank opening. Later on in the 34th minute, Abdullah Rahi, headed the ball into the goal through a lob from Yousuf Sr., After half-time. Both teams exchanged sides, and began the second-half on a fierce note, after a mistake made by Yang Woo-Sik, Ghulam Abbas Baloch tried a first-time shot, which did not succeed, the ball instead rolled over to Muhammad Umer, who made no mistake by putting the ball in the net. The last goal came in the 67th minute, which was scored by Ghulam Abbas Baloch, who registered his name on the scoresheet after heading home the fifth and final goal.

20 October 1962

Victoria (Pakistan)	5–1	(South Korea) Young Taegeuk
Umer 3', 43'; Ghafoor 4'; Abdullah 34'; Abbas 67'	Report	Lee Yi-woo 23'

Dhaka Stadium, Dhaka
Attendance: 35,000
Referee: M.A. Munshi (Pakistan)

=== Line-ups ===
- Victoria: Ghulam Hussain, Khuda Bakhsh, Gafur Baloch, Murad Bakhsh, Hussain Killer, Abdul Ghafoor, Ghulam Rabbani, Abdullah Rahi, Muhammad Umer, Ghulam Abbas Baloch, Yousuf Sr. (Yousuf Jr.).
- Young Taegeuk: Yang Woo-Sik, Lim Yong Kook, Um Kyong Jim, Lee Woo Bong, Kim Chong, Nam Un Kyong, Kim Yong Bai, Choh-Kae-Tai, Lim Kong Chan, Lee Yi-Woo, Chung Kang Moon.

== Statistics ==
=== 12 goals ===
- Muhammad Umer (Victoria)

=== 7 goals ===
- Yousuf Sr. (Victoria)

=== 5 goals ===
- Moosa Ghazi (Mohammedan)

=== 4 goals ===
- Ghulam Abbas Baloch (Victoria)
- M.N. Jehan (Pakistan Western Railway)
