= 1968 Aga Khan Gold Cup =

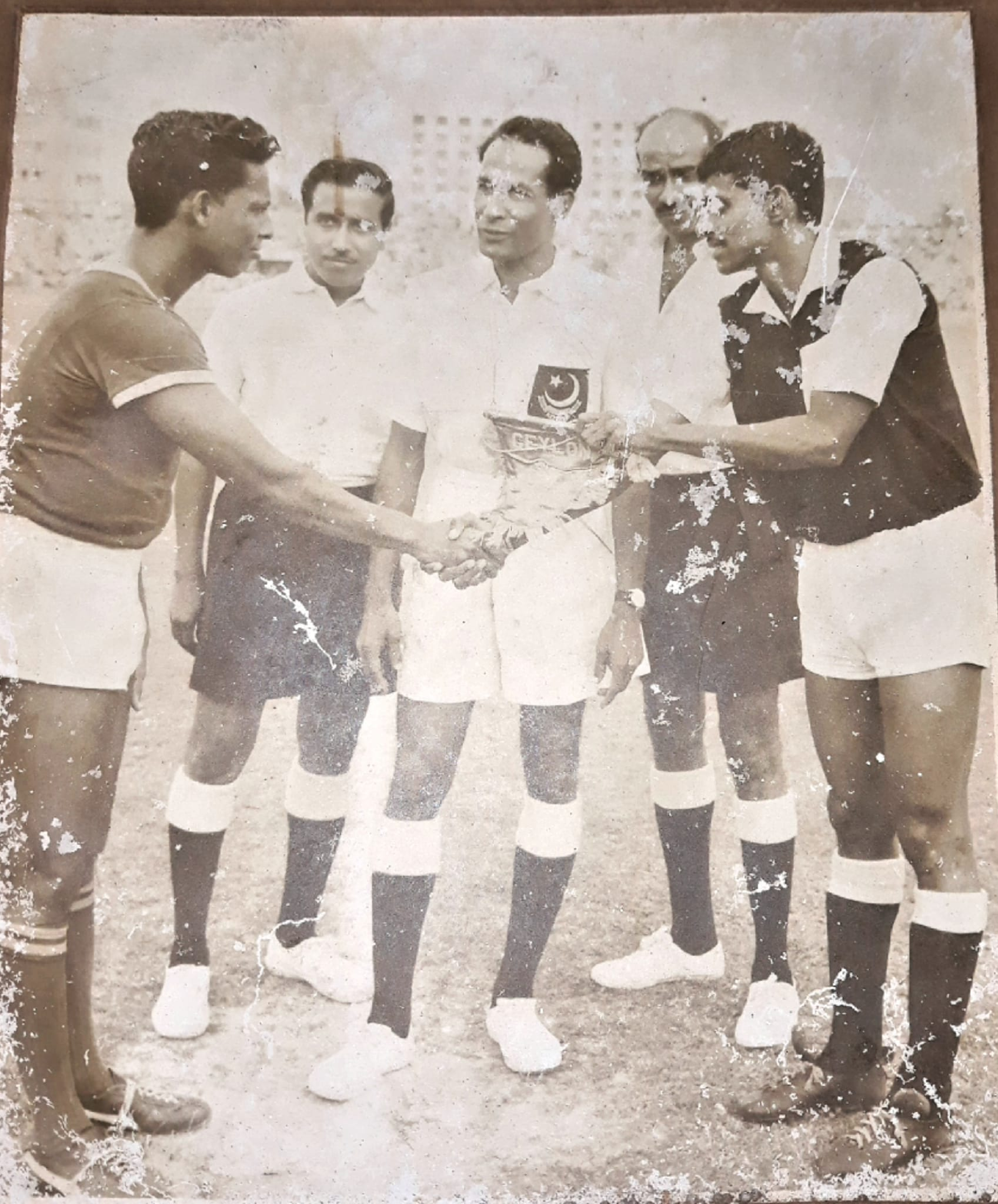
- Ceylon Colts captain Azeez Zainulabdeen (left) and Mohammedan captain Zakaria Pintoo (right) shaking hands before kickoff at the 1968 Aga Khan Gold Cup Final.

Tournament details
- Host country: East Pakistan (now Bangladesh)
- Dates: 25 October –12 November 1968
- Teams: 12 (from 1 confederation)
- Venue: Dhaka Stadium (in Dhaka host cities)

Final positions
- Champions: (Pakistan) Mohammedan SC (3rd title)

Tournament statistics
- Matches played: 16
- Goals scored: 45 (2.81 per match)

The 1968 Aga Khan Gold Cup was the tenth edition of the Aga Khan Gold Cup. The tournament was organized by the East Pakistan Sports Federation (EPSF) and all games were held at the Dhaka Stadium in Dhaka, East Pakistan (now Bangladesh), from 25 October 1968 to 12 November 1968. Matches lasted 70 minutes, with an additional 15 minutes of extra time if required during the knockout stages.

== Venues ==
Dhaka
Dhaka Stadium
Capacity: 25,000
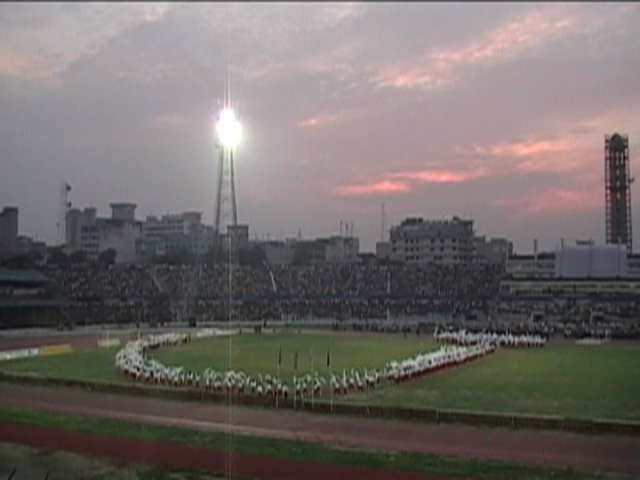

== Preliminary round ==
=== First phase ===
25 October 1968
15:30 UTC+6

| Dilkusha (Pakistan) | 0–1 | (Pakistan) Rahmatganj |
|---|---|---|
| | Report | Nasim 36' |

Dhaka Stadium, Dacca
Referee: Issa Khan (Pakistan)

26 October 1968
15:30 UTC+6

| PWD (Pakistan) | 5–0 | (Pakistan) East End Club |
|---|---|---|
| Abid 18' (pen.), 50'; Jamboo 52'; Jani 53'; Sharfuddin 57' | Report |

Dhaka Stadium, Dacca
Referee: M.Kabir (Pakistan)

=== Second phase ===
27 October 1968
15:30 UTC+6

| EPIDC (Pakistan) | 2–0 | (Pakistan) Rahmatganj |
|---|---|---|
| Aslam 33'; Yousuf Jr. 34' | Report |

Dhaka Stadium, Dacca
Referee: Zahurul Alam (Pakistan)

28 October 1968
15:30 UTC+6

| Warsak (Pakistan) | 3–0 | (Pakistan) Dhaka Wanderers |
|---|---|---|
| Jehangir Khan 8', 15'; Ghafoor 62' | Report |

Dhaka Stadium, Dacca
Referee: Mond Ali (Pakistan)

29 October 1968
15:30 UTC+6

| PWD (Pakistan) | 2–2 | (Pakistan) KMC |
|---|---|---|
| Jhunu 23'; Sharfuddin 31' | Report | Umer 40'; Taqi 65' |

Dhaka Stadium, Dacca
Referee: Mond Ali (Pakistan)

Replay

30 October 1968
15:30 UTC+6

| PWD (Pakistan) | 0–3 | (Pakistan) KMC |
|---|---|---|
| | Report | Taqi 4', 12'; Umer 5' |

Dhaka Stadium, Dacca
Referee: Issa Khan (Pakistan)

30 October 1968
15:30 UTC+6

| Pakistan Airlines | 3–1 | (Pakistan) Warsak |
|---|---|---|
| Allah Bakhsh 15', 60'; Nawaz 23' | Report | Jehangir Khan 62' |

Dhaka Stadium, Dacca
Referee: Issa Khan (Pakistan)

== Robin league ==
=== Group A ===
| Pos | Team | Pld | W | D | L | GF | GA | GD | Pts | Qualification |
|---|---|---|---|---|---|---|---|---|---|---|
| 1 | (Pakistan) EPIDC | 2 | 2 | 0 | 0 | 4 | 2 | +2 | 4 | Advance to the Semi-finals |
| 2 | Indonesia XI | 2 | 1 | 0 | 1 | 5 | 3 | +2 | 2 | Advance to the Semi-finals |
| 3 | Pakistan Airlines | 2 | 0 | 0 | 2 | 2 | 6 | −4 | 0 | |

Source: Pakistan Observer
1 November 1968
15:30 UTC+6

| EPIDC (Pakistan) | 2–1 | Pakistan Airlines |
|---|---|---|
| Hasheem 14'; Ayub 67' | Report | Allah Bakhsh |

Dhaka Stadium, Dacca
Referee: Zahurul Alam (Pakistan)

3 November 1968
15:30 UTC+6

| Pakistan Airlines | 1–4 | Indonesia XI |
|---|---|---|
| Siddik 50' | Report | Iswadi 25', 26', 40'; Waskito |

Dhaka Stadium, Dacca
Referee: Zahurul Alam (Pakistan)

5 November 1968
15:30 UTC+6

| EPIDC (Pakistan) | 2–1 | Indonesia XI |
|---|---|---|
| Yousuf Jr. 24'; Amin 57' | Report | Kadir 60'; Waskito |

Dhaka Stadium, Dacca
Referee: Zahurul Alam (Pakistan)

=== Group B ===
| Pos | Team | Pld | W | D | L | GF | GA | GD | Pts | Qualification |
|---|---|---|---|---|---|---|---|---|---|---|
| 1 | (Pakistan) Mohammedan | 2 | 1 | 1 | 0 | 3 | 1 | +2 | 3 | Advance to the Semi-finals |
| 2 | (Dominion of Ceylon) Ceylon Colts XI (Note: The Ceylon Football Association sent a CFA Colts XI, a development/second-string representative squad, selected because the senior national team was unavailable.) | 2 | 0 | 2 | 0 | 1 | 1 | 0 | 2 | Advance to the Semi-finals |
| 3 | (Pakistan) KMC | 2 | 0 | 1 | 1 | 2 | 4 | −2 | 1 | |

Source: Pakistan Observer
1 November 1968
15:30 UTC+6

| Ceylon Colts XI (Dominion of Ceylon) | 1–1 | (Pakistan) KMC |
|---|---|---|
| Wanigaratne 5' | Report | Taj Abdullah |

Dhaka Stadium, Dacca
Referee: S.A. Rashid (Pakistan)

2 November 1968
15:30 UTC+6

| Mohammedan (Pakistan) | 0–0 | (Dominion of Ceylon) Ceylon Colts XI |
|---|---|---|
| | Report |

Dhaka Stadium, Dacca
Referee: Issa Khan (Pakistan)

4 November 1968
15:30 UTC+6

| Mohammedan (Pakistan) | 3–1 | (Pakistan) KMC |
|---|---|---|
| Pratap 10'; Jabbar; Moosa | Report | Lari 50' |

Dhaka Stadium, Dacca
Referee: Mohd Ali (Pakistan)

== Knockout stage ==
=== Semi-finals ===
6 November 1968
15:30 UTC+6

| EPIDC (Pakistan) | 0–1 (a.e.t.) | (Dominion of Ceylon) Ceylon Colts XI |
|---|---|---|
| | Report | P.H.S. Albert 84' |

Dhaka Stadium, Dacca
Referee: Issa Khan (Pakistan)

7 November 1968
15:30 UTC+6

| Indonesia XI | Abandoned (Note: Indonesia XI abandoned the game, while leading 2–0, in protest after a penalty was awarded to Mohammedan SC fifteen minutes into the second-half.) (2–0) | (Pakistan) Mohammedan |
|---|---|---|
| Soetjipto 3'; Iswadi 23' | Report |

Dhaka Stadium, Dacca
Referee: Issa Khan (Pakistan)

=== Finals ===
12 November 1968
15:30 UTC+6

| Mohammedan (Pakistan) | 5–0 | (Dominion of Ceylon) Ceylon Colts XI |
|---|---|---|
| Tipu 21', 36'; Bakhsh 42'; Moosa 52'; Jabbar 65' | Report |

Dhaka Stadium, Dacca
Referee: Zahurul Alam (Pakistan)

| Mohammedan | Ceylon Colts XI |

| GK | Matin (GK) |
| RB | Zahirul Haque |
| LB | Abdul Ghafoor |
| CB | Zakaria Pintoo (c) |
| MF | Qadir Bakhsh |
| MF | Rasool Bakhsh |
| FW | Pratap Shankar Hazra |
| FW | Golam Sarwar Tipu | 21', 36' |
| FW | Moosa Ghazi | 52' |
| FW | Abdul Jabbar | 65' |
| FW | Maula Bakhsh | 42' |
Substitutions:
None

| GK | Piyadasa Perera (GK) |
| DF | John Fernando |
| DF | Rajasingham |
| DF | T. Halideen |
| MF | Ananda Peries | Substituted off |
| MF | P.H.S. Albert |
| MF | Judy Preena |
| FW | S.P. de Silva |
| FW | Azeez Zainulabdeen (c) |
| FW | Subhani Hassimdeen |
| FW | Mahinda Aluvihare |
Substitutions:
| MF | Wanigaratne | Substituted on |

== Indonesia XI vs Mohammedan; 7 November 1968 ==
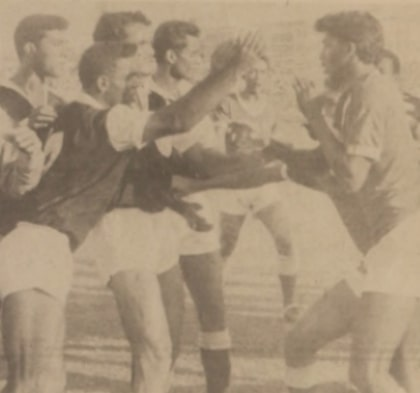
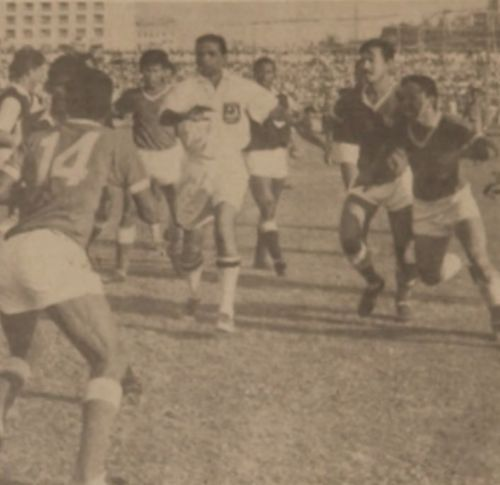
A physical altercation between the two teams in the first-half (above), Indonesian players protesting refree, Issa Khan's, penalty decision in the second-half (below).

"After 15 minutes of play in the second half a penalty kick was awarded in favour of Mohammedan side for handling the ball inside the penalty box of Indonesian side intentionally by a player of Indonesia. I placed the ball on the penalty mark but the Indonesian side started obstruction… and eventually the full team left the ground under the instigation of their Manager and Coach. I then allowed the kick to be taken by the Mohammedan side, but the game could not be restarted as the opponent was absent."

— Excerpt from Issa Khan's match report following the semi-finals.

"Just after 15 minutes of the game in second half, the Indonesian player No. 8 handed the ball intentionally inside the penalty area and the referee awarded a penalty kick. The players of Indonesian team kicked the ball out of the field when it was placed on the penalty spot and physically attacked the referee. The Manager of the team was requested to continue the game, but the Indonesian Team walked out of the ground and refused to participate as a protest against the decision of the referee. Considering the facts, the Committee unanimously resolves that the Indonesian Team be scratched from the tournament and the game be declared in favour of Mohammedan Sporting Club."

— Excerpt from the East Pakistan Sports Federation (EPSF) handout regarding the semi-final.

The semi-finals between Mohammedan Sporting Club and Indonesia XI, held at Dhaka Stadium on 7 November, ended in a controversial manner. Tensions begun rising when Indonesia scored their second goal in the 23rd minute. Following this, the local team reportedly applied rough tactics, with the Indonesian outside right Tumsila was fouled by Qadir Bakhsh, and in retaliation, Tumsila stamped on the prostrate Bakhsh. Mohammedan's outside left Golam Sarwar Tipu rushed to intervene and attacked Tumsila, leading to a brief scuffle involving multiple players from both sides. Police officers on duty entered the field, but the players themselves managed to calm the situation. After a three-minute halt, the match resumed and continued without further disturbances until the second-half.

Shortly after the second-half began, a penalty was awarded to Mohammedan after an Indonesian player picked up the ball with his hands inside the penalty box before the referee's whistle following an initial Indonesian appeal for a handball. This prompted the referee, Issa Khan, to award the penalty, enraging the Indonesian team, who physically confronted the referee and repeatedly kicked the ball away to prevent the penalty from being taken.

Despite multiple attempts by the referee and tournament officials to calm the situation and resume play, the Indonesian team refused to continue. After several minutes, the full Indonesian team, reportedly under the direction of their manager and coach, walked off the field in protest. Following this incident, the Tournament Committee reviewed the referee's report and unanimously decided to scratch Indonesia from the tournament, awarding the match to Mohammedan Sporting Club.
