= Azeez Zainulabdeen =

Sri Lankan footballer

- Zainul pictured post-retirement

Personal information
- Full name: Azeez Zainulabdeen
- Date of birth: Unknown
- Place of birth: Colombo, British Ceylon (present-day Sri Lanka)
- Date of death: 13 September 2010
- Place of death: Colombo, Sri Lanka
- Position: Inside right

Senior career*
Years	Team	Apps	(Gls)
- Victory FC

International career
1963–1968	Ceylon		
- * Club domestic league appearances and goals

Azeez Zainulabdeen (Sinhala: අසීස් සයිනුලාබ්දීන්; died 13 September 2010) was a Sri Lankan football player who primarily played as an inside-right. He was captain of the Sri Lanka national team in 1968.

== Club career ==
Zainul spent majority of his club career with Victory Football Club of Colombo.

== International career ==
Zainul represented the Ceylon FA XI the de facto national team at the 1962 Aga Khan Gold Cup. During the tournament, he scored four goals in a 9–1 demolishing of Dhaka Central Jail. In 1963, he was part of the Ceylon national team that played home and away matches against India in the 1964 Summer Olympics qualifiers.

On 28 February 1965, Ceylon secured their first international victory on home soil, defeating Pakistan 3–1 at the Sugathadasa Stadium in Colombo, with Zainul scoring the finishing goal, a "thirty metres bullet shot just before the final whistle" to beat Pakistani custodian, Muhammad Latif. In March 1968, he represented the team in two 1968 Summer Olympics qualification matches against Israel. In the same year, Zainul, who had represented Ceylon Colts XI in the Aga Khan Gold Cup in every edition starting from 1962, captained the team to a runners-up finish in the 1968 Aga Khan Gold Cup, losing the final 0–5 to locals Mohammedan SC.

== Post-retirement ==
Zainul served Victory Football Club as both player and coach. In 1962, he contested the Municipal Council elections as an independent candidate but was unsuccessful. He served as a board member under Mr. F.A. Yaseen and held several key roles, including as Technical Advisor. Additionally, he was the President of both the City Football League and the Colombo Football League, and served as the Secretary of the Nationalized Services.

== Death ==
On 13 September 2010, Zainul died after a brief illness. His funeral took place at the Jawatte Muslim Cemetery in Colombo.

In March 2014, the inaugural Zainulabdeen Memorial Challenge Trophy Invitation Football Tournament, an invitational competition was organised by Victory Football Club.

== Career statistics ==
=== International goals ===
List of international goals scored by Azeez Zainulabdeen
No.	Date	Venue	Opponent	Score	Result	Competition	Ref.
1	28 February 1965	Sugathadasa Stadium, Colombo, Ceylon	Pakistan	3–1	3–1	Friendly	
