= Ghulam Abbas Baloch =

Pakistani footballer (1942–2014)

Abbas
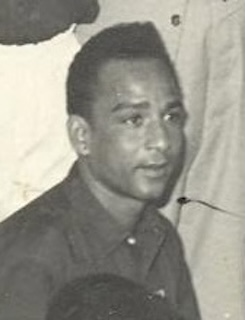
- Abbas with Pakistan Airlines in 1971

Personal information
- Full name: Ghulam Abbas Baloch
- Date of birth: October 1942
- Place of birth: Lyari, Karachi, British India
- Date of death: 4 April 2014 (aged 71)
- Place of death: Lyari, Karachi, Pakistan
- Position: Forward

Senior career*
Years	Team	Apps	(Gls)
1961	Mohammedan Sporting		(42)
1962–1965	Victoria	46+	(70+)
1966	Dacca Wanderers		
1967–??	KMC		
1970s	Pakistan Airlines		

International career
1961–1964	Pakistan		
- * Club domestic league appearances and goals

Ghulam Abbas Baloch (October 1942 – 4 April 2014), was a Pakistani professional footballer who played as a forward. Abbas represented the Pakistan national football team from 1961 to 1963.

== Early life ==
Abbas grew up in a poor family in Saifi Lane, Baghdadi, Lyari, in Karachi. Belonging to the Sheedi community, Abbas' paternal ancestors hailed from East Africa, who were brought to the subcontinent during the Indian Ocean slave trade. His relatives from Zanzibar and Dar es Salaam in present-day Tanzania often came to Pakistan to visit his grandfather, and Bilawal Belgium, a famous banjo musician who also belonged to Abbas's family.

He completed his primary education at SM Lyari School and passed his matriculation examination privately. He studied up to the intermediate level at SM College, earned a BA from Urdu College, and obtained both an LLB and an MA from Karachi University.

== Club career ==
=== Early career ===
Abbas started his career with Saifi Sports Club of Lyari. He also plied his trade in other clubs in Karachi such as Baloch Eleven, Gul Muhammad Lane, Nisar Sports Club, Pakistan Tobacco Company.

=== Dhaka Mohammedan ===
In 1961, Abbas represented Mohammedan Sporting, where he won the domestic double in his lone season. He also finished top goal-scorer in the league with Mohammedan with 42 goals including 5 hat-tricks.

=== Victoria ===
The following year, he joined the East Pakistan-based club Victoria SC and won three titles, including the First Division League, Aga Khan Gold Cup, and Independence Day Tournament. During the Aga Khan Gold Cup final against feeder team for South Korea, Abbas, who played as an inside-left, scored in a 5–1 victory, and also repeated his individual feat of being the top goal-scorer of the Dhaka League by netting in 38 goals.

=== Later career ===
In 1967, Abbas won the All-Pakistan Mohammad Ali Bogra Memorial Tournament while representing KMC, toppling runners-up Mohammedan SC by two points in the four team round-robin tournament. He last played for Pakistan Airlines until his eventual retirement.

== International career ==
Abbas received his first callup to the Pakistan national team for three exhibition matches against Burma on home soil. In the second friendly, held in Karachi on 20 January 1961, he scored a brace in a 4–0. Abbas scored the first goal for Pakistan in the Summer Olympics qualifiers against Iran on 4 October 1963. The game held in Tehran ended in a 4–1 defeat, and after Pakistan won their home leg in Karachi by a single goal, they were knocked out of the qualifiers on aggregate score. In 1964, Abbas was selected by the Pakistan national football team for their tour to China.

== Post–playing career ==
Abbas was appointed Pakistan Football Federation General Secretary in 1995, and held that position till 1999. He was also the founding general secretary and Chairman of the Sindh FA. During his time as Sindh FA chairman, Abbas was accused of selecting provincial teams based on personal bias.

On 31 December 2010, the Pakistan Football Federation awarded him with an honorary AFC gold medal.

== Personal life and death ==
Abbas' elder brother Fida Hussain died after an addiction to drugs. His younger brothers, Ghulam Ali was also a footballer, while his other younger sibling Saba Dashtyari was a popular professor who died by gunshot wounds amidst the political turmoil in Balochistan.

Abbas had a profound friendship with fellow teammates Abdul Ghafoor and Abdullah Rahi, who hailed from the same neighbourhood. He died on 4 April 2014 due to a long-term illness. His death was condoled by FIFA president Sepp Blatter and AFC president Salman Bin Ebrahim Al Khalifa.

== Career statistics ==
=== International goals ===
Scores and results list Pakistan's goal tally first, score column indicates score after each Abbas goal.

List of international goals scored by Ghulam Abbas Baloch
No.	Date	Venue	Opponent	Score	Result	Competition	Ref.
1	20 January 1961	Dhaka, East Pakistan	Burma		4–0	Friendly	
2	20 January 1961	Dhaka, East Pakistan	Burma		4–0	Friendly	
3	27 January 1961	Niaz Stadium, Chittagong, East Pakistan	Burma		1–1	Friendly	
4	4 October 1963	Amjadieh Stadium, Tehran, Iran	Iran	1–0	1–4	1964 Summer Olympics qualification	

== Honours ==
=== Victoria SC ===
- Dhaka First Division League
  - Winners (2): 1962, 1964
- Aga Khan Gold Cup
  - Winners (1): 1962

=== Mohammedan SC ===
- Dhaka First Division League
  - Winners (1): 1961

=== Individual ===
- 1961 − Most goals in Dhaka First Division League: 42 (with Mohammedan Sporting)
- 1962 – Most goals in Dhaka First Division League: 40 (with Victoria)
