= Yousuf Jr. =

Pakistani footballer (1940 – 2015)

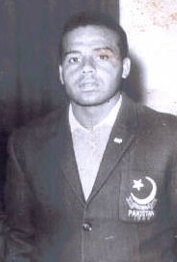

Personal information
- Date of birth: 1940
- Place of birth: Karachi, British India
- Date of death: 20 June 2015 (aged 75)
- Place of death: Karachi, Pakistan
- Position: Right winger

Youth career
- Rangiwara FC
- Baloch Eleven

Senior career*
Years	Team	Apps	(Gls)
- KMC
- Sindh Government Press
1957–1961	Mohammedan Sporting		
1962–1963	Victoria	38	(17)
1968	EPIDC		
1969	Dilkusha	8	(2)
1971–??	Karachi Port Trust		

International career
1963–1964	Pakistan		
- * Club domestic league appearances and goals

Yousuf Jr. (1940 – 20 June 2015) was a former Pakistani footballer who played as a winger. Yousuf is regarded as one of the best forwards of his era, he also represented the Pakistan national team from 1963–1964.

== Early life ==
Yousuf was born in Ragiwara, Lyari, Karachi.

== Club career ==
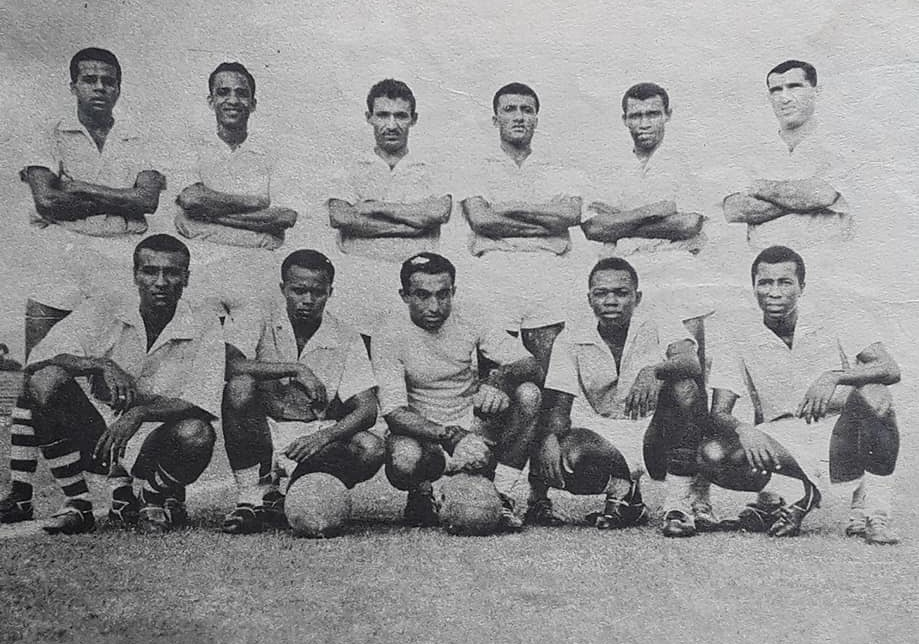
Yousuf standing first from left with Victoria in 1962.

Yousuf started his football career with Rangiwara FC, and later moved to Karachi club Baloch Eleven. Over the course of his career, he also represented KMC and Sindh Government Press.

In 1957, he joined Dhaka League side Dhaka Mohammedan. During his time there, he helped the club secure two Dhaka League titles and also appeared as a guest player for several clubs, he also represented Victoria throughout the 1960s. And played for EPIDC later on.

Following the secession of East Pakistan in 1971, he returned to Karachi and concluded his playing career with Karachi Port Trust.

== International career ==
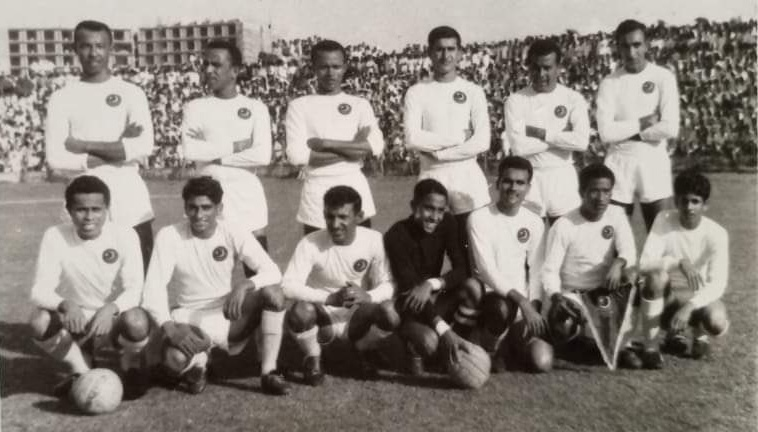
Yousuf standing second from right with the Pakistan national team in 1964

In 1963, Yousuf represented Pakistan in the 1964 Summer Olympics qualification against Iran, and was part of international tours to China and the Soviet Union in 1964.

== Personal life and death ==
Yousuf's son Pervez Yousaf served as national referee and Amjad Yousaf as footballer.

Yousuf died at the age of 75 on 20 June 2015 in Karachi. He was buried at the Mewah Shah Graveyard.

== Honours ==
Mohammedan Sporting

- Dhaka First Division Football League:
  - Winners (3): 1957, 1959, 1961

Victoria

- Dhaka First Division Football League:
  - Winners (1): 1962
- Aga Khan Gold Cup:
  - Winners (1): 1962
