= Outer Stadium Ground =

Sports venue in Dhaka, Bangladesh

Coordinates: 23.7266°N 90.4144°E

The Outer Stadium Ground is a major public sports venue in Dhaka, the capital of Bangladesh. It is a multi-use stadium with a capacity of 10,000.
