= BG Press S&RC =

- Full name: Bangladesh Government Press Sports and Recreation Club
- Nickname: The Pressmen
- Founded: 1949; 77 years ago
- Ground: BG Press Club Ground, Tejgaon
- Owner: Bangladesh Government Press
- Manager: Md Shahadat Hossain
- League: Dhaka Second Division League
- 2026–27: TBD
Home colours	Away colours

Bangladesh Government Press Sports and Recreation Club (Bengali: বাংলাদেশ গভর্নমেন্ট প্রেস স্পোর্টস এন্ড রিক্রিয়েশন ক্লাব), also referred as BG Press S&RC, is an association football club based in Dhaka, Bangladesh. The club currently participates in the Dhaka Second Division League, the fourth-tier of football in Bangladesh. They were champions of the First Division in 1952, and were relegated from the league while it was still the country's top-tier in 1976.

== History ==
=== Early years ===
The club was founded in 1949 as the East Bengal Government Press Sports and Recreation Club in Dhaka by the East Bengal Government Press (now Bangladesh Government Press), which had been relocated from Calcutta, West Bengal following the partition of India. The club was based in Azimpur. Its founding president, Superintendent N. H. Kahndoker, had served with the Government Press in Calcutta for nearly three decades prior to the partition. The club entered the Second Division of the Dhaka Football League in 1950. Under the captaincy of Ashrafuddin Mallick, it won the Second Division title unbeaten in 1951, securing promotion to the First Division.

=== First Division triumph and aftermath ===

E.B.G Press's starting line-up in their 1952 First Division title securing match against Dhaka Wanderers on 1 August 1952 (Exact formation and player positions unknown).

In 1952, the club appointed former Kolkata Mohammedan player Abdus Sattar as head coach and signed Rashid Chunna as a player. Under Rashid's captaincy, the Pressmen won the Dhaka Football League First Division title in their debut season following promotion. They secured the championship with a 2–0 victory over defending champions Dhaka Wanderers in their final league match on 1 August, with Rashid scoring both goals despite the team requiring only a draw to clinch the title. Rashid also finished as the league's top scorer that season. The club secured 18 victories, 1 draw, and 1 defeat, scoring 60 goals while conceding 20.

In the same month as their league triumph, the club participated in the IFA Shield in West Bengal, India. Entering the tournament from the second round, they were eliminated after losing the replay 2–1 to Calcutta Football League Second Division side Beniatola on 24 August, following a 1–1 draw in the original match held two days earlier. Abdur Razzak scored in the first match, while Rashid scored in the replay. The club also finished as runners-up in the Ronaldshay Shield, losing the final 2–0 to E.B. Railway on 15 September.

In 1953, the club won the Ronaldshay Shield by defeating Azad 3–0 in the final on 27 September. The goals were scored by Rashid and Razzak, with Razzak netting a brace. The following year, the Pressmen finished as league runners-up, three points behind champions Dhaka Wanderers. In 1955, the club was renamed East Pakistan Government Press Sports and Recreation Club.

On 12 November 1963, then club president A.K.M. Zakaria inaugurated the club ground in Tejgaon.

=== Relegation ===
Following the independence of Bangladesh, the club was renamed Bangladesh Government Press Sports and Recreation Club. Eventually in 1976, the club was relegated from the First Division after 25 years.

On 10 November 2022, Bangladesh Football Federation found the club guilty of match-fixing following its defeat to bottom-placed Khilgaon SC in the 2021–22 Second Division and imposed a fine of Tk 500,000. The club was also deducted three points, while its general secretary, Shikdar Moshiur Rahman, head coach Md Delowar Hossain, team manager Md Rafiqul Islam Sarkar, and five players—Salman Rahman, Mostafizur Rahman, Shahin Alam Pranto, Swadhin Biswas, and Mehedi Hasan—were banned from all football-related activities for six months. Another player, Md Tanis Mia, received a three-month suspension. Despite qualifying, the club was barred from participating in the Super League round, extending its stay in the Second Division (the fourth-tier since 2012) to 45 years.

== Current squad ==
As of 13 July 2026

Note: Flags indicate national team as defined under FIFA eligibility rules; some limited exceptions apply. Players may hold more than one non-FIFA nationality.

No.	Pos.	Nation	Player
1	GK	BAN	Rakibul Islam Rony
2	DF	BAN	Md Rabbi Mia
3	DF	BAN	Md Mostakim
4	DF	BAN	Dipu Das
5	DF	BAN	Kumaresh Mohanto Porom
6	MF	BAN	Abu Sakin
7	MF	BAN	Masum Ali Mujahid
8	MF	BAN	Md Sabbir
9	MF	BAN	Md Asaduzzaman Munna (Captain)
10	FW	BAN	Md Mifta Hosen Antor
11	FW	BAN	Akash Tripura
12	FW	BAN	Ridoy Ahmod Forhad
13	MF	BAN	Md Shahdullah
14	FW	BAN	Samiul Islam Jidan
15	DF	BAN	Md Nowshad Ali
16	MF	BAN	Nobogit Hajong
17	MF	BAN	Polash Chandro Roy
18	DF	BAN	Md Monir Uddin Fahim

No.	Pos.	Nation	Player
19	DF	BAN	Md Abdul Koddus
20	FW	BAN	Md Naj Morshed
21	FW	BAN	Md Shezan
22	GK	BAN	Shihab Ahammed
23	GK	BAN	Md Milon
24	GK	BAN	Md Tanbir
25	DF	BAN	Torikul Islam Fahim
26	DF	BAN	Arpon Chakma
27	DF	BAN	Md Yeasin Khan
28	MF	BAN	Samir Mojumder
29	FW	BAN	Md Rabbi Miya
30	FW	BAN	Md Jihad
31	MF	BAN	Md Nishan Sarkar Rifat
32	FW	BAN	Jihad Mondol
33	FW	BAN	Md Tawhid Mahmud
34	FW	BAN	Junaed Islam Himu
35	MF	BAN	Arafat Rahman

== Team records ==
=== Coaching records ===
As of 4 July 2026

Head Coach	From	To	P	W	D	L	GS	GA	%W
(Bangladesh) Md Shahadat Hossain	15 April 2026	Present	1	0	0	1	0	2	0.00

== Personnel ==
=== Current technical staff ===
As of 13 July 2026

Position	Name
Head coach	(Bangladesh) Md Shahadat Hossain
Team Manager	(Bangladesh) Md Hedayetul Islam
Team Leader	(Bangladesh) Md Abu Yunus
Assistant Manager	(Bangladesh) Md Zahirul Islam
Media Officer	(Bangladesh) Md Mustafizur Islam
Equipment Manager	(Bangladesh) Md Rasel Khan
Security Officer	(Bangladesh) Md Abdul Kalam Azad
Fitness Coach	(Bangladesh) Md Moniruzzaman Mithun

== Honours ==
- Dhaka First Division League
  - Champions (1): 1952
- Dhaka Second Division League
  - Champions (1): 1951
- Ronaldshay Shield
  - Winners (1): 1953

== See also ==
- List of football clubs in Bangladesh
- History of football in Bangladesh
