= Indonesia XI =

Association football team

Indonesia XI (also known as Indonesia Selection, Indonesia All-Stars, Indonesia Dream Team or Liga Selection) is a football team which represents the Indonesian top-tier league. Indonesia XI mainly plays friendly matches against foreign clubs.

== Matches ==
24 May 2012	Liga Selection (Indonesia)	0–3	(Italy) Inter Milan^{1}	Jakarta, Indonesia
			Longo 36'; Pazzini 53'; Tremolada 71'	Stadium: Gelora Bung Karno Main Stadium; Referee: Faulur Rosy (Indonesia)

26 May 2012	Indonesia	2–4	(Italy) Inter Milan^{1}	Jakarta, Indonesia
19:00 UTC+7	Patrich 11'; Yosua 90+3'		Coutinho 5', 42'; Pazzini 61', 73'	Stadium: Gelora Bung Karno Main Stadium; Attendance: 50,000; Referee: Nagor Amir Noor Mohamed (Malaysia)

4 August 2012	Indonesia	0–5	(Spain) Valencia^{1}	Jakarta, Indonesia
21:30 UTC+7		Report	Piatti 4'; Alcácer 12', 56'; R. Costa 25'; Hernández 52'	Stadium: Gelora Bung Karno Main Stadium; Referee: Faulur Rosy (Indonesia)

14 July 2013	Indonesia Dream Team	0–7	(England) Arsenal^{1}	Jakarta, Indonesia
20:45 UTC+7		Report	Walcott 19'; Akpom 54'; Giroud 70', 73'; Podolski 83'; Olsson 85'; Eisfeld 86'	Stadium: Gelora Bung Karno Main Stadium; Attendance: 85,000; Referee: Suhaizi Shukri (Malaysia)

20 July 2013	Indonesia All-Stars	0–2	(England) Liverpool^{1}	Jakarta, Indonesia
18:30 UTC+7		Report	Coutinho 19'; Sterling 87'	Stadium: Gelora Bung Karno Main Stadium; Attendance: 85,000; Referee: Mohd Nafeez Abdul Wahab (Malaysia)

25 July 2013	Indonesia All-Stars	1–8	(England) Chelsea^{1}	Jakarta, Indonesia
18:30 UTC+7	Kalas 69' (o.g.)	Report	Hazard 22' (pen.); Ramires 30', 57'; Ba 32'; Terry 45'; Traoré 52'; Lukaku 53', 66'	Stadium: Gelora Bung Karno Main Stadium; Attendance: 88,000

11 January 2018	Indonesia Selection	0–6	Iceland^{1}	Sleman, Indonesia
18:30 UTC+7		Report	Bjarnason 30'; Finnbogason 47'; Karlsson 66'; Haraldsson 68'; Hermansson 81'; Eyjólfsson 82'	Stadium: Maguwoharjo Stadium; Attendance: 7,000; Referee: Yudai Yamamoto (Japan)

6 July 2025	Liga Indonesia All-Stars	3–6	(England) Oxford United^{1}	Jakarta, Indonesia
18:30 UTC+7	Simanjuntak 14'; Rizky Dwi 75'; Runtukahu 81'	Report	Harris 2', 30'; Helik 45'; Bradshaw 53'; Płacheta 56'; Keersmaecker 68'	Stadium: Gelora Bung Karno Stadium; Attendance: 41,026; Referee: Muhammad Taqi (Singapore)

1 August 2026	Indonesia All Stars	1–3	(England) Aston Villa^{1}	Jakarta, Indonesia
19:00 UTC+7	Arkhan 83'	Report	Buendía 3'; Barkley 45'; Madjo 57'	Stadium: Gelora Bung Karno Stadium; Attendance: 40,000; Referee: Thoriq Alkatiri (Indonesia)

- ^{1} Non FIFA international match

== Honours ==
- Aga Khan Gold Cup (Unofficial Asian Champions' Cup)
  - Winners (1): 1961

== See also ==
- Indonesia national under-23 football team
- Indonesia national under-21 football team
- Indonesia national under-19 football team
- Indonesia national under-17 football team
- Indonesia women's national football team
- Indonesia national futsal team
- Indonesia national football team records and statistics
- ASEAN All-Stars
- Malaysia League XI
- Singapore Selection XI
