= Aboojan (footballer) =

Pakistani former footballer

Personal information
- Full name: Aboojan
- Date of birth: 1943 (age 82–83)
- Place of birth: British India
- Position: Centre-forward

Youth career
- West Pakistan Sports Club

Senior career*
Years	Team	Apps	(Gls)
1960s	Mohammedan Sporting	27+	(18+)
1960s	PWD		
1960s	SGP		

International career
1962	Pakistan Youth	1+	(1)
- * Club domestic league appearances and goals

Aboojan, alternatively spelled as Abujan, (Urdu: ابوجان; born 1943) is a former Pakistani footballer, Aboojan was a part of the Pakistan Youth team in 1962.

== Club career ==
=== Early career ===
Aboojan began his career at the age of 15, participating in first division football tournament, he also toured Dacca, Bombay, and Saudi Arabia, with various clubs. He captained the West Pakistan Sports Club, and Government FC. During his playing career, he represented the Karachi Division at the National Football Championship.

=== Senior career ===
Later on, Aboojan joined Mohammedan Sporting, one of the leading team's of the Dacca Top-flight league. Creating a significant impact whenever brought on, scoring several goals for the club during his time. Before joining PWD, forming a solid partnership with fellow striker, Abdul Jabbar.

In addition, he represented the Sindh Government Press.

== International career ==
In 1962, Aboojan represented the Pakistan Youth team at the 1962 AFC Youth Championship. Where he scored a goal against Indonesia Youth on 21 April 1962, which resulted in a 3–0 win for Pakistan Youth.
