= Issa Khan (referee) =

Pakistani football referee

- Born: Unknown; British India
- Died: Unknown

Domestic
Years	League	Role
1960s	National Football Championship	Referee
1960s	Dacca Football League	Referee

International
Years	League	Role
1960s	FIFA listed	Referee

Issa Khan, was a international referee for Pakistan. He is regarded as one of the most prominent footballers of his era.

== Career ==
Khan regularly referred matches at the National Football Championship and the Dacca Football League. Alongside frequently being selected to officiate matches at the Aga Khan Gold Cup, notably, supervising 1964 and 1967 editions of the finals.

Khan was also affiliated FIFA referee. He referred several of the Pakistan national team's matches. He also referred the match between Iran and Turkey at the 1967 RCD Cup.

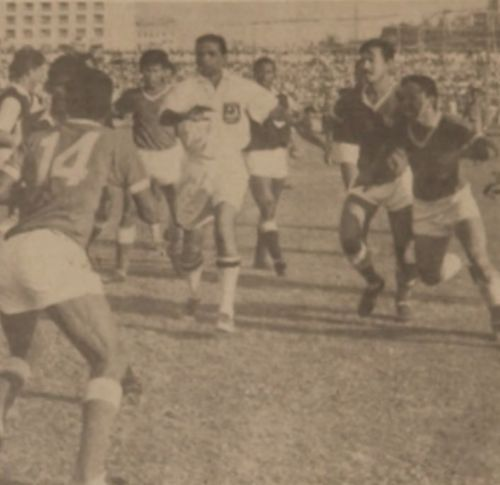
Indonesian players rushing to Issa Khan.

In 1968, while supervising the semi-final match between Indonesia XI and Mohammedan Sporting, after a penalty was awarded to Mohammedan Sporting in the second-half, the Indonesians protested and an altercation ensured, the match was eventually abandoned after physical battle between both teams.

"After 15 minutes of play in the second half a penalty kick was awarded in favour of Mohammedan side for handling the ball inside the penalty box of Indonesian side intentionally by a player of Indonesia. I placed the ball on the penalty mark but the Indonesian side started obstruction… and eventually the full team left the ground under the instigation of their Manager and Coach. I then allowed the kick to be taken by the Mohammedan side, but the game could not be restarted as the opponent was absent."

— Excerpt from Issa Khan's match report following the semi-finals.

Later on, Mohammedan Sporting were awarded the match and entered the final, where they beat the Ceylon Colts XI, winning the competition.
