= Zahurul Alam =

Bangladeshi FIFA referee (1926–2017)

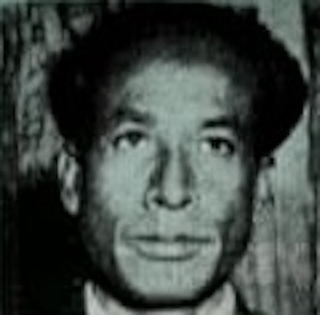
- Alam in 1969
- Born: 1926; British India
- Died: 27 October 2017 (aged 91); Dhaka, Bangladesh

Domestic
Years	League	Role
1955–1980	Dhaka Football League	Referee

International
Years	League	Role
1968–1980	FIFA listed	Referee

Zahurul Alam (Bengali: জহুরুল আলম; 1926 – 27 October 2017), commonly known as Z Alam, was a Bangladeshi FIFA referee.

== Refereeing career ==
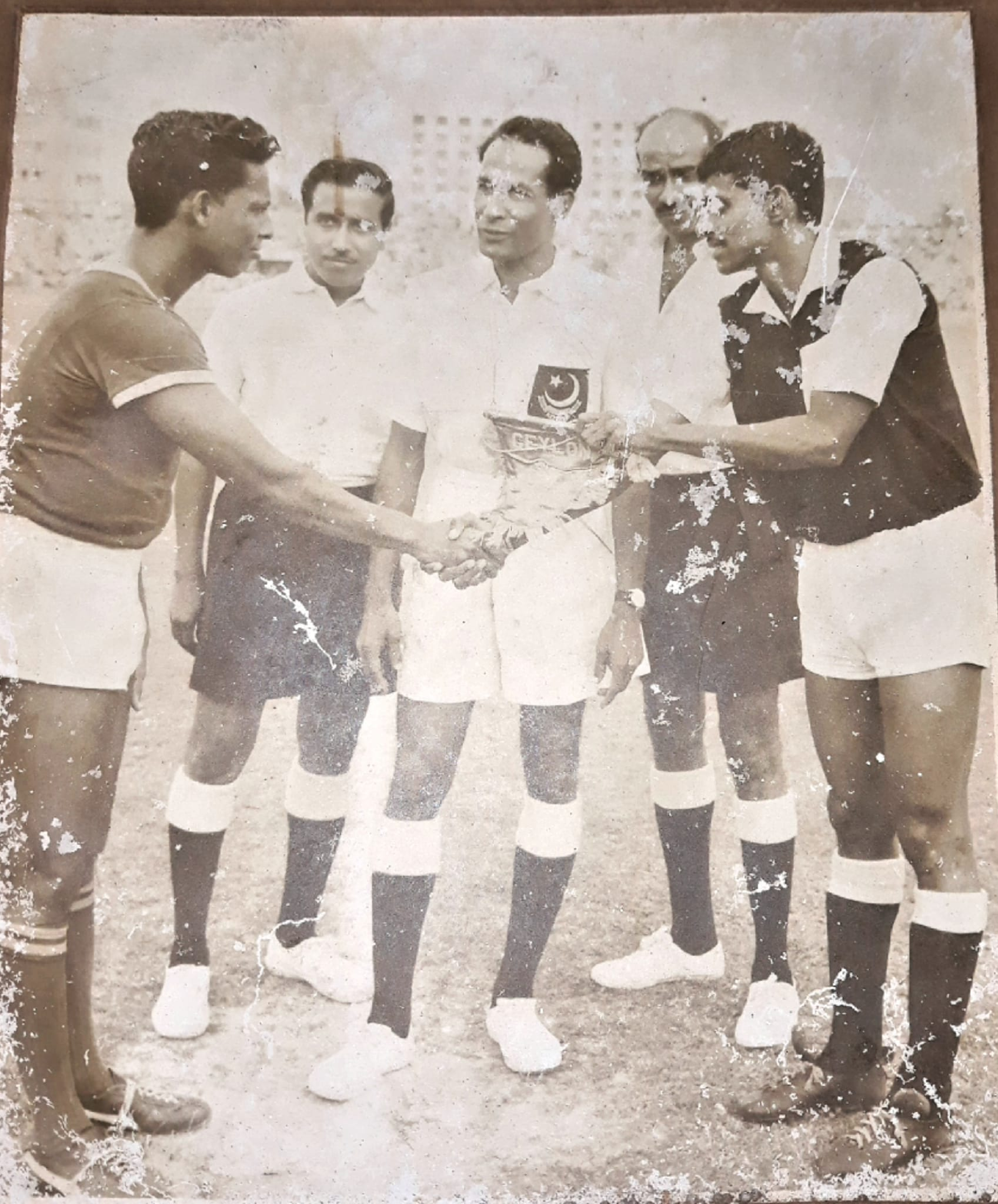
Alam (middle) supervising the 1968 Aga Khan Gold Cup final match between Ceylon Colts and Dhaka Mohammedan

Alam began his refereeing career in 1955, and earned FIFA recognition in 1968 as member of the Pakistan Football Federation. The following year, he began refereeing at international level at the 1969 Friendship Cup in Iran. After the independence of Bangladesh, he supervised the 1972 Summer Olympics Asian Qualifiers in Tehran in 1971, 1973 Merdeka Tournament in Malaysia, 1975 King’s Cup in Thailand, 1978 AFC Youth Championship, and formally retired in 1980.

== Post-retirement ==
After his retirement in 1980, he was secretary of the Football Referees Committee of the Bangladesh Football Federation from 1982 until 2003. He also worked as a Kabaddi organiser from 1908 till 1998 during his tenure as vice-president of the Bangladesh Kabaddi Federation from 1990 till 2005.

He was awarded a gold medal of Kazi Mahbub Ullah and Zebunnesa Welfare Trust in 1995.

== Personal life and death ==
Alam died on 27 October 2017 at BIRDEM Hospital in Dhaka at the age of 91. He left behind two sons and three daughters.

In 2021, a football tournament was organised in his memory by the Bangladesh football referee association.
