= Bangladesh Railway S.A. =

Bangladeshi institutional football club

- Full name: Bangladesh Railway Sports Association
- Nickname: The Railwaymen
- Founded: c. 1911 (as Assam-Bengal Railway Sports Association)
- Ground: M. A. Aziz Stadium
- Capacity: 30,000
- Owner: Bangladesh Railway
- League: CJKS-CDFA Second Division
Home colours	Away colours

Bangladesh Railway Sports Association (Bengali: বাংলাদেশ রেলওয়ে স্পোর্টস অ্যাসোসিয়েশন) is the sports section of Bangladesh Railway, the state-owned railway operator of Bangladesh. Established in the early 1900s in Chittagong during the British Raj as the Assam–Bengal Railway Sports Association, it is best known for its football team.

During the British era, the team competed in local football leagues and tournaments across Chittagong and Dhaka. Following the Partition of India, it continued to participate in regional football leagues in both regions until the Independence of Bangladesh. After independence, the club consolidated its operations in Chittagong. The football team currently competes in the Second Division of the Chittagong Football League.

== History ==
=== Assam–Bengal Railway (1900s–1942) ===
The Assam–Bengal Railway Football Challenge Shield was established in 1908 at Pahartali Thana, in the Chittagong District of British India. The competition was contested by teams representing different units of the Assam Bengal Railway and was open exclusively to railway employees below officer rank. Teams were organized according to the division of employees into volunteer companies. A. J. Cooper, Lieutenant Colonel of the Assam Bengal Railway Battalion, Indian Army, served as President of the Railway Football Committee. The Chittagong Railway Institute emerged as an early dominant force in the tournament, winning the championship in both 1909 and 1910. On 23 June 1909, an exhibition match was played between the Railway and Station in the port city, which the Railway won by 3–1. Notably, both teams were composed of British railwaymen and officials. The success and popularity of the recreational competition played a significant role in the development of organized football within the railway system and led to the formation of the Assam–Bengal Railway football team. In 1911, the team participated in the Sen and Sen Cup in Chittagong. The team advanced to the semi-finals but was eliminated following a narrow 1–0 defeat to eventual champions, United Ordinary on 6 September 1911.

=== Bengal–Assam Railway (1942–1947) ===
On 1 January 1942, the Assam Bengal Railway merged with the Eastern Bengal Railway to form the Bengal and Assam Railway, and the sports club was subsequently renamed to reflect this change. The club later began operating its football team in Dhaka and soon entered the Dhaka First Division Football League. The Railway club tent was notably maintained in Chittagong. Before each match, the team traveled from the port city to Dhaka in two separate railway carriages and stayed in separate compartments at Fulbaria railway station. During that period, league matches were primarily held at the Dhaka Sports Association Ground in Paltan, which was within walking distance from the station. In 1946, the Railway team, composed of British and Bengali players, won the First Division League title. On 15 July, they defeated the Dhaka Central Jail 3–0, with goals from Jones and S. K. Achary, the latter scoring a brace. Two days later, on 17 July, the club secured the league championship by defeating Wari Club 4–1 at the Dhaka Sports Association Ground, with goals from D. Ganguly, N. Guha, and another brace from S. K. Achary.

The team also reached the semi-finals of the A.R.P. Cup after defeating Ramna Club 1–0 on 20 July, with centre-forward Jones scoring the winning goal. They were scheduled to face that year's Second Division champions, New East Bengal Club, in the semi-final, however, match reports of this encounter have yet to be located.

=== Eastern Bengal Railway (1947–1961) ===

Eastern Bengal Railway's starting line-up at the 1952 Ronaldshay Shield final against Bengal Government Press.

Following the Partition of India, the team was renamed Eastern Bengal Railway, and was also referred to as East Bengal Railway. The team was re-organized by Yusuf Khan, formerly of Eastern Railway FC of Calcutta. In 1948, Railwaymen won the inaugural Independence Day Football Tournament in Dhaka. In 1949, the team finished bottom of the Dhaka First Division League, however, they continued their participation in the First Division until dropping out of the league in 1952. In 1946, a football league was inaugurated in Chittagong. With the Railwaymen shifting their focus back to the port city, they won the Chittagong First Division League several times, including in 1950. In the same year, the team reached the final of the Independence Day Football Tournament in Dhaka, losing 0–1 to Dhaka City XI in the final held on 14 August 1950.

The team also won the Ronaldshay Shield in Dhaka in both 1951 and 1952. In the final of the latter, they defeated Dhaka First Division League champions Bengal Government Press 2–0, with goals from Mari Chowdhury and Alauddin Khan. During this period, the Railwaymen introduced the Anglo-Indian attacking trio of George Macwa, Isaac, and Rowshan Ali "Robson", of whom Macwa represented the club for almost a decade and also served as club captain.

In 1953, they again reached the Independence Day Football Tournament final held in Dhaka. After two replays that ended in draws, the team ultimately succumbed to a 1–2 defeat against Dhaka University on 4 September 1953, with Razzak scoring the only goal for the Railwaymen. In 1957, the team finished runners-up in the Pakistan Inter-Railway Football Championship held in Chittagong, losing the tournament final 1–3 on 20 October at the Niaz Stadium. In 1958, the club won the Dhaka Second Division League, however, were unable to participate in the First Division the following season, thus, runners-up, Tejgaon Sports Club were promoted instead. In 1959, the club once again won the Chittagong First Division League and also participated in the 1959 Aga Khan Gold Cup, where they were eliminated in the second-round, after receiving a bye in the first-round.

From 1950 to 1960, Eastern Railway players represented the Pakistan Combined Railway team in the National Football Championship. Notable players who represented the combined team included George Macwa, Alauddin Khan, Mohammed Rashidullah, and Shankar. Notably, Yusuf Khan of Eastern Railway captained the combined team during the 1952 edition. Additionally, in 1956, two separate Railway teams participated in the National Championship. On 9 May 1959, the Railwaymen played an exhibition match against the Pakistan national team at the Niaz Stadium and lost the game by 1–9. The home team's only goal was scored by Shankar.

=== Pakistan Eastern Railway (1961–1971) ===

Pakistan Eastern Railway's starting line-up at the 1963 National Football Championship East Zone final against Chittagong Division.

In 1961, the Eastern Bengal Railway was renamed Pakistan Eastern Railway, and the club's name was changed accordingly. A separate side, Pakistan Western Railway, represented the railway division in West Pakistan. The two teams then became eligible to participate separately in the National Football Championship.

The Railwaymen returned to the Dhaka First Division League in 1962 after being crowned champions of the Second Division. That same year, the club reached the Ronaldshay Shield final in Chittagong but narrowly lost 0–1 to Jagannath College in the replayed final match held at the Niaz Stadium on 21 November, following a 2–2 draw two days prior. During this decade, the team would simultaneously participate in the Chittagong First Division League.

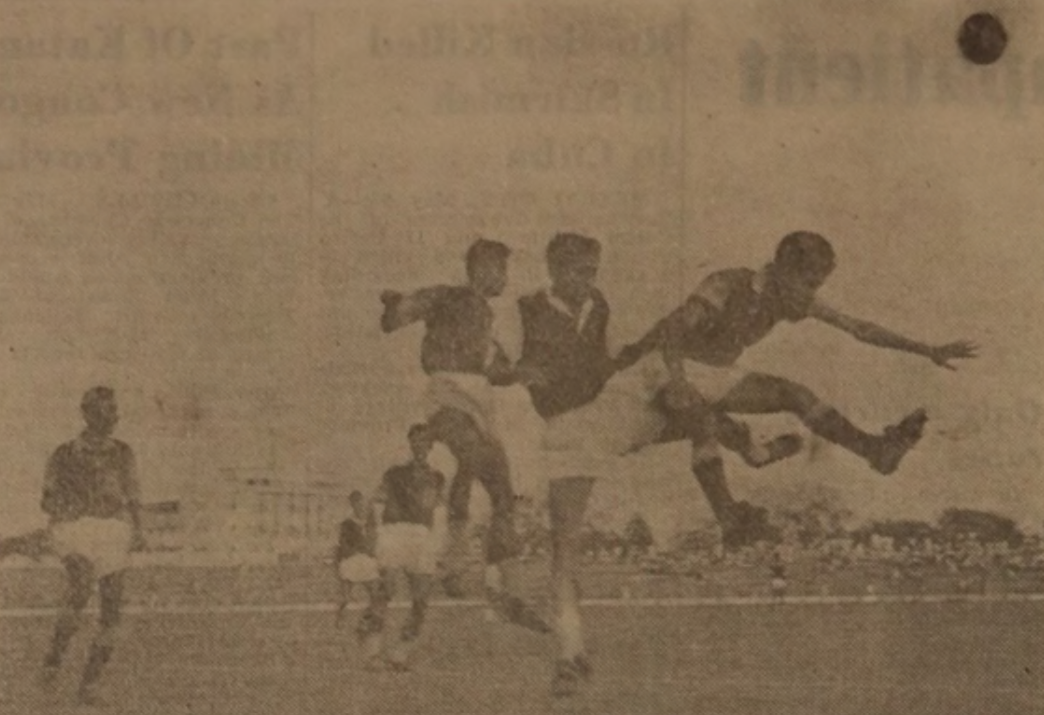
First Division League game between P.E. Railway and Dhaka Wanderers Club, held on 23 May 1963 at the Dhaka Stadium.

In 1963, they achieved a significant milestone by winning the National Football Championship East Zone final held in Chittagong, defeating Chittagong Division 3–2 at the Niaz Stadium on 28 November. The Railwaymen's goals were scored by Shankar, Prakash, and Mukul. Both teams advanced to the main tournament in Karachi, where the Railwaymen were eventually eliminated in the round-robin stage following defeats to Sargodha Division and Pakistan Western Railway.

In 1965, the team finished bottom of the First Division in Dhaka. However, the East Pakistan Sports Federation (EPSF) allowed them to retain their First Division status in consideration of their past performances. Despite this reprieve, the team once again finished at the bottom of the league the following year, managing just one victory and suffering 18 defeats in 24 matches. They conceded 69 goals while scoring only 17, a record that ultimately confirmed their relegation from the First Division.

Following their second relegation from the First Division of Dhaka, the Railwaymen returned to competing exclusively in Chittagong. The team's decline was largely attributed to the spending priorities of the Pakistan Eastern Railways Sports Control Board. At the time, the board allocated its largest share of funding, Rs 40,000, to its annual athletics meet, while hockey received Rs 10,000. Football, by contrast, was heavily neglected, with only a meagre Rs 5,000 allocated for the entire six-month season. Their final success during that decade came on 21 September 1967, when the Railwaymen defeated Dhaka University in the final of the Ronaldshay Shield by 1–0 at the Niaz Stadium.

=== Bangladesh Railway (1971–present) ===
Following the Independence of Bangladesh, the team was taken over by the Bangladesh Railway and was subsequently renamed. In 1977, the club finished as runners-up to Chittagong Mohammedan in the Chittagong First Division Football League. The team also participated in the 1979 Aga Khan Gold Cup in Dhaka, but was eliminated in the qualification round after a 1–3 defeat to Rahmatganj MFS.

In the following years, the club faced severe financial constraints, which hindered its ability to assemble competitive squads. As a result, the team suffered successive relegations, first to the Second Division and later to the Third Division. The club achieved a turnaround in the 2022–23 season by winning the Chittagong Third Division Football League, thereby securing promotion back to the Second Division.

== Honours ==
- Dhaka First Division League
  - Champions (1): (Note: The Dhaka Football League has been held since at least 1911. However, champions from before the Partition of India, particularly in the First Division, have not yet been officially recognized by the Bangladesh Football Federation (BFF). In addition, a complete list of champions from its current three-tier structure during the British Raj is still incomplete and under research.) 1946
- Dhaka Second Division League
  - Champions (2+): 1958, 1961
- Chittagong First Division League
  - Champions (2+): 1950, 1959
- Chittagong Third Division League
  - Champions (1): 2022–23
- Independence Day Football Tournament
  - Champions (1): 1948
- Ronaldshay Shield
  - Champions (3): 1951, 1952, 1967

== Other departments ==
=== Field Hockey ===
Railway had a formidable field hockey team that competed in the Dhaka First Division Hockey League prior to the Independence of Bangladesh. They won the league title most notably in 1959, 1960, 1961, 1962, and 1965. The team also participated in the National Hockey Championship prior to independence. Following independence and the introduction of the Premier Division, the team failed to compete at the top level. In 2016, they returned to the Premier Division after earning promotion the previous season, however, the team was relegated soon after and returned to the First Division Hockey League.

Honours

- Dhaka First Division League (level 1)
  - Champions (5+): 1959, 1960, 1961, 1962, 1965

== See also ==
- List of football clubs in Bangladesh
- History of football in Bangladesh
