= East Pakistan Sports Federation =

East Pakistani sports organisation

- পূর্ব পাকিস্তান ক্রীড়া ফেডারেশন

Agency overview
- Formed: 1947; 79 years ago 20 May 1951; 75 years ago (merged with East Pakistan Sports Association)
- Dissolved: 16 December 1971; 54 years ago
- Jurisdiction: Government of East Pakistan
- Headquarters: Purana Paltan, Dhaka (present-day Bangladesh)

The East Pakistan Sports Federation (EPSF) was the provincial governing body responsible for the administration and coordination of sports in East Pakistan. It oversaw several sporting disciplines, including football, cricket, field hockey, wrestling, volleyball, boxing, badminton, cycling, athletics, gymnastics, and shooting. The federation became defunct following Bangladesh's victory in the Liberation War on 16 December 1971, and its responsibilities were subsequently assumed by the National Sports Council (NSC), which became the national governing authority for sports in Bangladesh.

== History ==
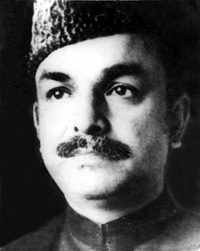
Habibullah Bahar Chowdhury served as EPSF's first president after merger from 1951 to 1953.

In 1947, the East Pakistan Sports Federation (EPSF) was formed in Calcutta with Khwaja Nooruddin and Mohammad Shahjahan, both members of Calcutta Mohammedan, elected as its general secretary and assistant secretary, respectively. However, the organisation initially existed solely on paper. Following the partition of India, the Dhaka Sports Association (DSA) in Dhaka, East Pakistan, was renamed the East Pakistan Sports Association (EPSA) in January 1951. On 20 May 1951, EPSF was merged with the EPSA and reintroduced, with Habibullah Bahar and Siddikur Rahman serving as its president and general secretary, respectively. EPSF served as the province's primary sports body from 1951 to 1971. It was affiliated with the District Sports Associations, Inter-University, Police, Eastern Command and Railway Sports Board. It operated sports activities in Dhaka alongside the Dhaka District Sports Association (DDSA), while supervising the other DSAs and Sports Boards. The EPSF was also responsible for forming teams for inter-provincial competitions. In both 1958 and 1969, the EPSF governing body was dissolved by Martial Law Administration.

== Office-bearer ==
=== Presidents ===
Name	Period	Notes
(Pakistan) Habibullah Bahar	1951–1953	
(Pakistan) Nurul Amin	1953–1954	
(Pakistan) Abu Hussain Sarkar	1955–1956	
(Pakistan) Ataur Rahman Khan	1956–1958	
(Pakistan) Brig. Sahib Dad Khan	1959–1961	
(Pakistan) G.Ahmed	1961–1966	
(Pakistan) S.B. Chaudhuri	1966–1967	
(Pakistan) Sultan Ahmed	1967–1969	
(Pakistan) Mazharul Haq	1970–1971	
