= 1962 Victoria SC season =

Victoria Sporting Club
1962 season
- Stadium: Dacca Stadium, Dacca
- Dacca First Division: 1st
- Aga Khan Gold Cup: Winners
- Top goalscorer: (Pakistan) Ghulam Abbas Baloch (38)
Home colours	Away colours

Victoria Sporting Club played in Dacca First Division, the first level division for the 1962 season. The team were crowned champions, and had additionally secured the 1962 Independence Day Football Tournament and the 1962 Aga Khan Gold Cup respectively, without losing a single game their whole domestic season.

== Dhaka First Division Football League ==
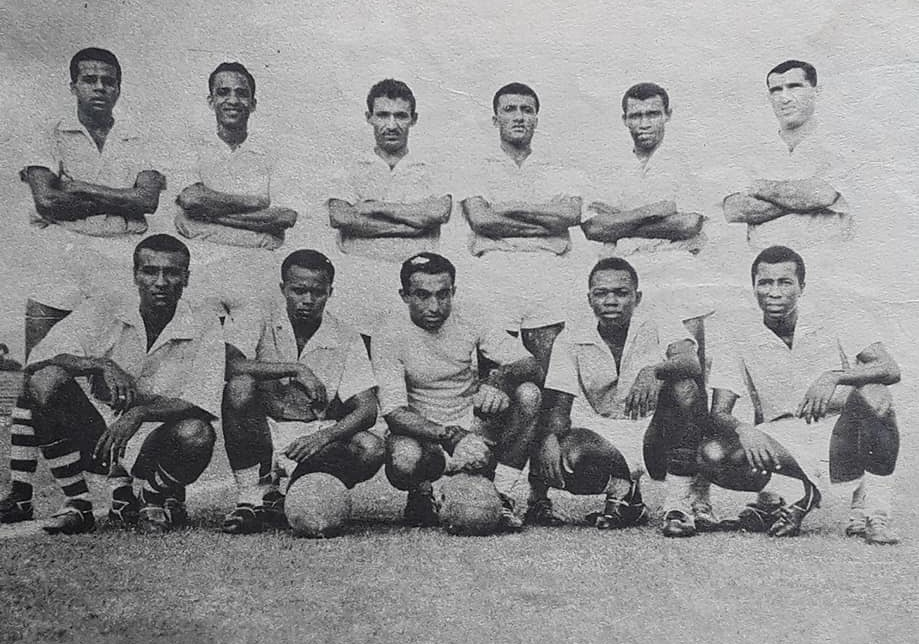
Victoria's line-up against Wari on 16 August 1962.

The club won the 1962 edition of the Dacca League, which took place from 5 May to 31 August. In total, the club played 23 games, won 22, and drew once, without losing a single game. The top goal-scorer of the league was Ghulam Abbas Baloch, who netted in 38 goals, and following him were his teammates, Muhammad Umer and Abdullah Rahi, scoring 27 and 20 goals respectively.

=== Matches ===
6 May 1962	Victoria	1–0	PWD	Dacca, East Pakistan
	Abdullah 59'	Report		Stadium: Dacca Stadium; Referee: Ishaque

11 May 1962	Victoria	7–0	Pakistan Eastern Railway	Dacca, East Pakistan
	Abdullah 5', 40', 57'; Abbas 10'; Umer 30'; Yousuf Sr. 42'; Yousuf Jr. 43'	Report		Stadium: Dacca Stadium; Referee: M. A. Hamza

20 May 1962	Victoria	6–1	Pakistan Eastern Railway	Dacca, East Pakistan
	Abbas 18'; Ghafoor 22'; Abdullah 39', 47'; Umer 55'; Hussain 60'	Report	Saber 19' (pen.)	Stadium: Dacca Stadium; Referee: Shekih Shaheb Ali

23 May 1962	Victoria	8–1	Fire Service	Dacca, East Pakistan
	Abdullah 10'; Abbas 20', 32', 34'; Umer; Ghafoor	Report	Sarfuddin 33'	Stadium: Outer Stadium; Referee: Nani Bashak

28 May 1962	Victoria	7–1	Ispahani Club	Dacca, East Pakistan
	Yousuf Jr. 3'; Abdullah 9', 18', 23', 28'; Abbas 44'; Yousuf Sr. 52'	Report	Samad 13'	Stadium: Dacca Stadium; Referee: Ali

3 June 1962	Victoria	8–1	Dacca Wanderers	Dacca, East Pakistan
	Yousuf Sr. 5'; Abbas 10', 17', 25', 32', 39'; Umer 52'; Abdullah 58'	Report	Yaqub 41'	Stadium: Dacca Stadium; Attendance: 20,000; Referee: Zahurul Alam

7 June 1962	Victoria	2–2	Police	Dacca, East Pakistan
	Sultan 49'; Abbas 56'	Report	Nabi 2'; Akhtar 33'	Stadium: Dacca Stadium; Referee: Issa Khan

10 June 1962	Victoria	3–0	EGP Press	Dacca, East Pakistan
	Abbas 22'; Yousuf Sr. 25'; Ghafoor 46'	Report		Stadium: Dacca Stadium; Referee: Nani Bashak

16 June 1962	Victoria	6–0	Central Printing Stationary	Dacca, East Pakistan
	Hussain; Umer 24'; Abbas 33', 42', 49'; Yousuf Sr. 50'	Report		Stadium: Dacca Stadium; Referee: M. A. Munshi

20 June 1962	Victoria	3–0	Azad Sporting	Dacca, East Pakistan
	Yousuf Sr. 17'; Abbas 47'; Ghafoor 49'	Report		Stadium: Dacca Stadium; Referee: Zahurul Alam

22 June 1962	Victoria	4–1	DC Mills	Dacca, East Pakistan
	Umer 6', 25'; Ghafoor 7'; Yousuf Jr. 34'	Report	Lytton 48'	Stadium: Dacca Stadium; Referee: Issa Khan

25 June 1962	Victoria	5–0	Mohammedan Sporting	Dacca, East Pakistan
	Ghafoor 5'; Yousuf Jr. 6', 40'; Abbas 45'; Umer 52'	Report		Stadium: Dacca Stadium; Attendance: 35,000; Referee: Zahurul Alam

1 July 1962	Victoria	3–1	Wari	Dacca, East Pakistan
	Yousuf Sr. 2'; Umer 6'; Abbas 45'	Report	Samad 18'	Stadium: Dacca Stadium; Referee: Issa Khan

6 July 1962	Victoria	10–0	DC Mills	Dacca, East Pakistan
	Abbas 1', 41'; Umer; Abdullah 46', 48'; Ghafoor			Stadium: Dacca Stadium; Referee: M. A. Hamza

17 July 1962	Victoria	8–1	Fire Service	Dacca, East Pakistan
	Abbas 2'; Umer 5', 29', 58'; Abdullah 25', 27'; Ghafoor 28'; Yousuf Sr. 57'	Report	Moni 32' (pen.)	Stadium: Dacca Stadium; Referee: M. A. Munshi

24 July 1962	Victoria	6–0	Police	Dacca, East Pakistan
	Umer 7', 32', 37'; Abbas 42', 44', 58'	Report		Stadium: Dacca Stadium; Referee: Zahurul Alam

27 July 1962	Victoria	1–0	PWD	Dacca, East Pakistan
	Umer 52'	Report		Stadium: Dacca Stadium; Referee: Zahurul Alam

3 August 1962	Victoria	5–0	Azad Sporting	Dacca, East Pakistan
	Umer 18', 43'; Mantu (o.g.); Yousuf Jr. 38'; Abbas 45'			Stadium: Dacca Stadium; Referee: Issa Khan

5 August 1962	Victoria	2–1	Dacca Wanderers	Dacca, East Pakistan
	Ghafoor 27'; Abdullah 40'	Report	Patrick 13'	Stadium: Dacca Stadium; Referee: M. A. Munshi

8 August 1962	Victoria	5–2	Mohammedan Sporting	Dacca, East Pakistan
	Abbas 10'; Abdullah 21', 44', 55'; Umer 33'	Report	Ashraf 47'; Muree 59'	Stadium: Dacca Stadium; Attendance: 40,000; Referee: Sheikh Shaheb Ali

16 August 1962	Victoria	9–0	Wari	Dacca, East Pakistan
	Abbas; Umer 26'; Yousuf Sr. Yousuf Jr.	Report		Stadium: Dacca Stadium; Referee: M. A. Munshi

24 August 1962	Victoria	6–0	Central Printing Stationary	Dacca, East Pakistan
	Abbas; Umer; Ghafoor	Report		Stadium: Dacca Stadium; Referee: Zahurul Alam

27 August 1962	Victoria	4–1	Ispahani Club	Dacca, East Pakistan
	Yousuf Sr. Umer; Abbas	Report	Samad	Stadium: Dacca Stadium; Referee: M. A. Hamza

== Independence Day Football Tournament ==
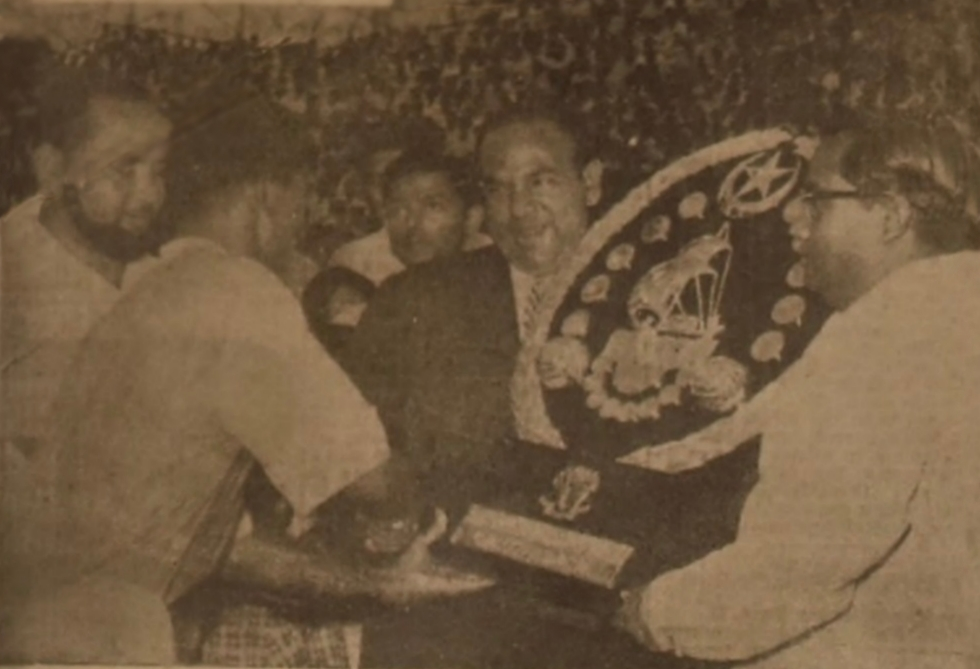
Muhammad Umer (left), receiving the Independence Day Football Tournament trophy from A.T.M. Mustafa.

The Independence Day Football Tournament was also won by Victoria, who were placed in the semi-finals against Azad Sporting. The match was won by Victoria with a scoreline of 7–1.

The final which took place on 14 August, against Mohammedan Sporting, who were the joint-winners with Victoria the previous edition, failed to capture the trophy as Victoria defeated their rivals 2–0.

=== Matches ===
11 August 1962 Semi-finals	Victoria (Pakistan)	7–1	(Pakistan) Azad Sporting	Dacca Stadium
	Abdullah 18'; Abbas 19', 28'; Umer 20', 55', 57'; Yousuf Sr. 61'	Report	Hafiz	Referee: Zahurul Alam

14 August 1962 Final	Victoria (Pakistan)	2–0	(Pakistan) Mohammedan Sporting	Dacca Stadium
	Yousuf Sr. 3'; Abbas 58'			Referee: M. A. Hamza

== Aga Khan Gold Cup ==
Muhammad Umer (left), receiving the Aga Khan Gold Cup trophy from Tunku Abdul Rahman.

Prior to the tournament, Victoria loaned several of Pakistan's top footballers from other clubs, the likes of Ghulam Rabbani, Mohamed Abdul Hakim, and Abdul Gafur Baloch from Dacca Wanderers joined the squad for the tournament. The tournament ran through 27 September till 20 October. And saw Victoria securing yet another title, after defeating Dacca University, Baloch XI, Ceylon FA, and Pakistan Western Railway in the semi-finals, booking their ticket to the final where they dismantled the South Korea Youth Selection in the final by 5–1.

=== Matches ===
29 September 1962 First Phase	Victoria (Pakistan)	9–0	(Pakistan) Dacca University	Dacca Stadium
	Yousuf Sr. Abbas 15'; Abdullah 45'; Umer	Report		Referee: Issa Khan

10 October 1962 Second Phase	Victoria (Pakistan)	3–1	(Pakistan) Baloch Eleven	Dacca Stadium
	Yousuf Sr. 15'; Umer 32'; Abdullah 55'	Report	Mehrab	Referee: Shekih Shaheb Ali

14 October 1962 Quarter-finals	Victoria (Pakistan)	7–1	(Sri Lanka) Ceylon FA	Dacca Stadium
	Umer; Yousuf Sr. 30'; Abbas; Ghafoor	Report	Aluvihare 18'	Referee: M. A. Munshi

16 October 1962 Semi-finals	Victoria (Pakistan)	Abandoned (Note: Game abandoned 5 minutes before full-time at 3–2 due to poor lighting. Notably, the game started at 4:36pm instead of 4:00 pm as the East Pakistan Sports Federation failed to provide Pakistan Western Railway transport to Dhaka Stadium.) (3–2)	Pakistan Western Railway	Dacca Stadium
	Umer 9', 10'; Abbas 51'	Report	Jehan 14', 42'	Referee: M. A. Munshi

18 October 1962 Semi-finals (Replay)	Victoria (Pakistan)	5–1	Pakistan Western Railway	Dacca Stadium
	Yousuf Sr. 20'; Ghafoor 30'; Umer 45', 54', 62'	Report	Jehan 18'	Referee: Zahurul Alam

20 October 1962 Final	Victoria (Pakistan)	5–1	(South Korea) Young Taegeuk	Dacca Stadium
	Umer 3', 43'; Ghafoor 4'; Abdullah 34'; Abbas 67'	Report	Lee Yi-woo 23'	Attendance: 35,000; Referee: M. A. Munshi

== Squad ==
Includes players loaned for Aga Khan Gold Cup participation

Nat	Name	Birth	Born	Pos	LA	LG	CA	CG	TA	TG
(Pakistan)	Ghulam Hussain		Karachi	GK	23	0	5	0	28	0
(Pakistan)	Mohamed Abdul Hakim		Rajshahi	GK	0	0	1	0	1	0
(Pakistan)	Murad Bakhsh	1943	Karachi	DF	23	0	4	0	27	0
(Pakistan)	Muhammad Hussain "Killer"		Karachi	DF	18	2	5	0	23	2
(Pakistan)	Lal Muhammad Khamisa		Karachi	DF	23	0	1	0	24	0
(Pakistan)	Khuda Bakhsh		Karachi	DF	20	0	5	0	25	0
(Pakistan)	Abdul Gafur Baloch	1936	Karachi	MF	0	0	4	0	4	0
(Pakistan)	Abdul Ghafoor "Majna"	1938	Karachi	MF	21	10	5	3	26	13
(Pakistan)	Abdullah Jr.			MF	3	0	0	0	3	0
(Pakistan)	Ghulam Abbas Baloch	1942	Karachi	FW	23	38	5	4	28	42
(Pakistan)	Yousuf Jr.	1940	Karachi	FW	23	7	1	0	24	7
(Pakistan)	Yousuf Sr.	1939	Karachi	FW	20	11	5	7	25	18
(Pakistan)	Abdullah Rahi	1939	Karachi	FW	20	20	5	3	25	23
(Pakistan)	Muhammad Umer	1935	Karachi	FW	20	27	5	12	25	39
(Pakistan)	Ghulam Rabbani	1936	Delhi	FW	0	0	5	0	5	0
(Pakistan)	Sultan Jan				8	0	0	0	8	0
(Pakistan)	Pratap Shankar Hazra	1943	Munshiganj	FW	4	0	0	0	4	0
(Pakistan)	Bashir Ahmed	1941	Dacca	FW	2	0	0	0	2	0

Transfer information from Pakistan Observer:

- Transfers in (1962 League): Abdullah Rahi (Mohammedan), Abdul Ghafoor (Mohammedan).
- Transfer out (1962 League): Moosa Ghazi (Mohammedan), Muhammad Hussain (Mohammedan).

== See also ==
- 1962 Dhaka First Division Football League
- 1962 Aga Khan Gold Cup
