= Dhaka Wanderers Club =

Bangladeshi association football club

- Full name: Dhaka Wanderers Club
- Nickname: The Wanderers
- Founded: 1937; 89 years ago
- Ground: Chandpur Stadium
- Capacity: 5,000
- President: Mohammad Abdus Salam
- Head Coach: Prajwal Pratip Chetri
- League: Bangladesh Football League
- 2026–27: TBD
Home colours	Away colours

Dhaka Wanderers Club (Bengali: ঢাকা ওয়ান্ডারার্স ক্লাব) is a professional football club from Motijheel area of Dhaka, Bangladesh. It currently competes in the Bangladesh Football League, the first-tier of Bangladeshi football, having been promoted from the 2025–26 Bangladesh Championship League.

The Wanderers are one of the oldest and most successful clubs in the country. They won seven domestic First Division titles prior to the Independence of Bangladesh. The club has also won the Independence Day Football Tournament five times. In continental football, their greatest achievement remains a runners-up trophy in the 1963 Aga Khan Gold Cup. However, their only success post-independence was a runners-up finish in the 1987 Federation Cup.

The club uses the BSSS Mostafa Kamal Stadium in Dhaka as their home venue. Wanderers have a long-standing rivalry with Dhaka Mohammedan, which dates back to the East Pakistan era, although its intensity has decreased over the years. The club's traditional home colours are black and white, similar to their arch-rivals.

== History ==
=== Establishment and early years (1937–1948) ===
The club was established as the Dhaka Muslim Wanderers Club in 1937 in the Kalta Bazar market area of Dhaka, British regime. The founding members consisted of the area's Muslim youth community, including notable figures such as Yar Mohammed, Abdullah Hai, Siraj Uddin, Abdul Qader, Abdus Sadek Shona, Mohon, Abdus Sayeed Mutkar, Alauddin, Chan Mia, Shamsuddin Shaju, Jumman Bepari, and Shahabuddin. Among them, Yar Mohammed and Abdullah Hai served as the club's first president and secretary, respectively. The club initially concentrated exclusively on football but later broadened its scope to incorporate hockey and cricket teams.

Following the growing influence of sports-loving members from the Nawab family of Dhaka, the club was renamed Dhaka Wanderers Club in 1939. In the same year, they won the Second Division Football League of Dhaka and entered the First Division in 1940. During this period, Sheikh Mujibur Rahman (later known as Bangabandhu) was known to have played for the club. In 1944, Wanderers reached the semi-finals of the prestigious Ronaldshay Shield, which was the club's biggest achievement during the British rule. The club tent at that time was located south of the land now occupied by the Outer Stadium Ground.

=== Strongest in East Pakistan (1948–1956) ===
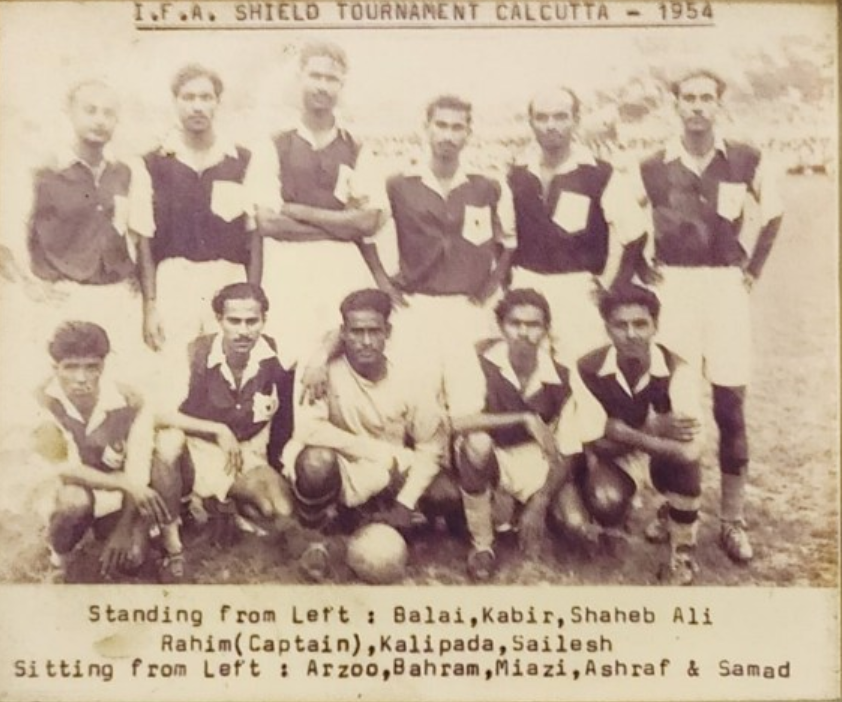
Dhaka Wanderers Club at the 1954 IFA Shield.

Following the Partition of India, Wajeed Ali Miazi, the club's goalkeeper and captain, served as its football secretary from 1949–1950 and joint secretary from 1951–1960. Notably, Miazi had begun acting as player-cum-coach in 1947. In 1949, the club finished runners-up in the First Division and were also joint champions of the Ronaldshay Shield. The tournament final against Commilla Mohammedan, held at the Dhaka Sporting Association ground on 25 September 1949, ended in a 0–0 draw. The Wanderers' starting eleven consisted of Wajeed Ali Miazi, Sheikh Shaheb Ali, Nur Mia, Mahbub, Nozor Mohammed, Soleman, Khan Majlish, Moharaj, Sadek, Yusuf Reza, and Shamsu. This joint cup triumph marked the beginning of the club's domination of the domestic football scene over the next decade.

The club won its maiden First Division title in 1950 and achieved successive league triumphs by 1951. The following year, Bengal Government Press stopped Wanderers from claiming their third-consecutive league title. In the title-deciding match on 1 August 1952, Pressmen defeated Wanderers 2–0. Although Wanderers still had two league matches remaining, they were seven points behind the eventual champions, confirming their finish as runners-up. Nonetheless, in 1953, the club clinched their third First Division title. Notably, they defeated Wari Club 12–1 in a league fixture held on 27 July, during which center-forward, Abu Sayed Rafiqul Bari, better known as Bahram, scored five goals. On 31 July, the club sealed the league title with a 3–0 victory over eventual runners-up, Azad SC, with goals coming from Raushan Ali "Robson", George Macwa, and Abdur Rahim. In the same year, the club traveled to West Bengal to participate in the IFA Shield in Calcutta, India. After receiving a bye in the first round, the club drew twice 0–0 against compatriot side Chittagong Mohammedan before winning the third replay of their second round fixture on 10 September by 2–0. The scorers were Abdur Rahim and Rashid. In the third round, the club were eliminated 1–0 by Hindustan Aircraft FC in the replay on 13 September after a goalless draw.

In 1954, under the captaincy of Abdur Rahim, Wanderers retained the First Division League title. The club's center-forward, Bahram, finished as the league's top scorer, while their left-inside, Ashraf Chowdhury, finished second on the goal scorers list. In the same year, Wanderers once again participated in the IFA Shield. In the first-round match, held on 7 September, the club defeated local side, Kalighat Club 3–1, with goals from Bahram, Ashraf, and Rashid. In the second-round match against local league champions, Mohun Bagan, held on 11 September, the game was abandoned due to poor lighting at the East Bengal–Mohun Bagan Ground, while the visitors trailed 1–2 in front of more than 30,000 spectators. The visitors scored their only goal through Ashraf. Eventually, in the replayed match held on 14 September, Wanderers were eliminated from the tournament after losing 0–4 to Mohun Bagan.

In 1955, Wanderers won their third-consecutive First Division League title. However, controversy over the league season remains, as it was abandoned midway due to regional flood. The club was leading the points table until the league was abandoned, and according to their officials during that period, Wanderers were eventually declared champions by the authorities that year. On 14 August 1955, the club defeated I.G. Police XI 2–1 in the Independence Day Tournament final held in Mohammedan Sports Ground in Dhaka. Both goals were scored by the club's Anglo-Indian right-outside, Robson. In the same year, the club participated in the IFA Shield for the third consecutive year. Beginning in the first round on 21 September, they defeated Maharana Club of Guwahati 2–0, with goals from Abdur Rahim and Tajul Islam Manna. In the second round, held on 23 September, the club were eliminated after a 1–0 defeat to Sibasagar Amateur Club.

=== Rivalry with Dhaka Mohammedan (1956–1966) ===
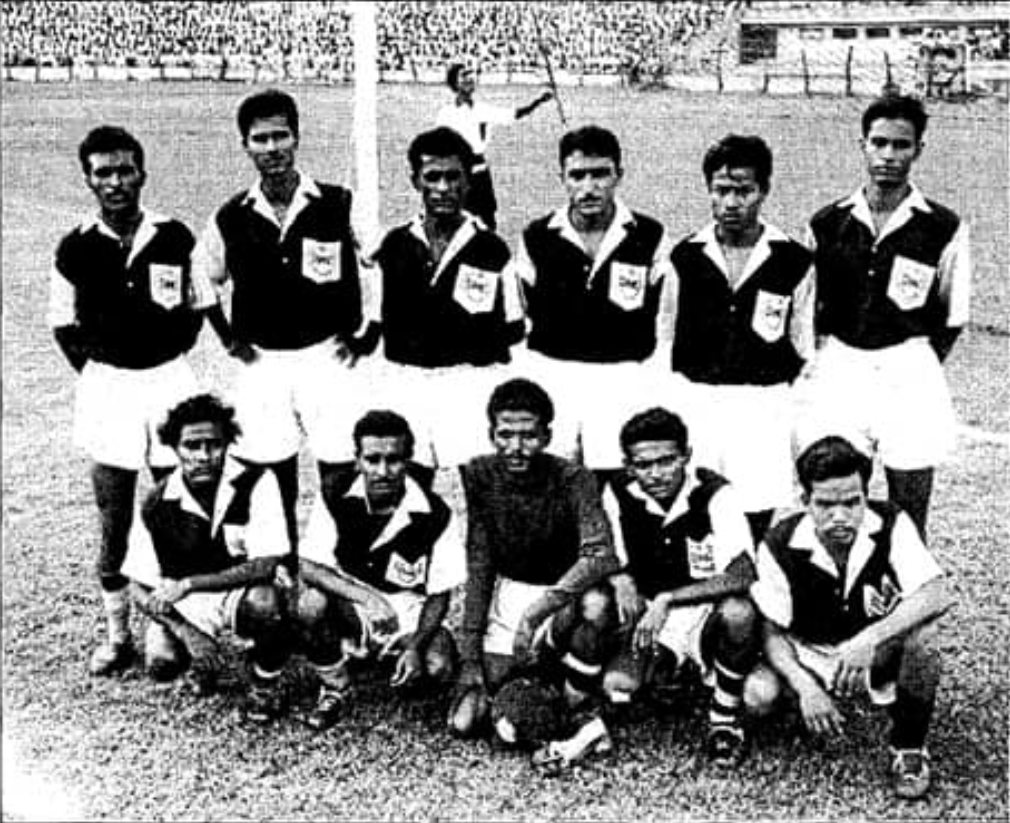
Dhaka Wanderers Club at the 1960 Aga Khan Gold Cup in Dhaka.

In 1956, many key players from the club, including Amir Jang Ghaznavi, Bahram, Fazlur Rahman Arzu, Kabir Ahmed, Shoki Samad, and Ashraf Chowdhury, joined Mohammedan Sporting Club following an internal conflict with the club's officials, despite this, the club signed centre-half Nabi Chowdhury, who led a young team to a record fourth consecutive First Division title. Mohammedan, the initial favourites, finished as runner-up and were level on points with Wanderers after the league was held in a single-leg format, but their refusal to play a playoff final led the East Pakistan Sports Federation (EPSF) to award the trophy to the Wanderers. In September, Wanderers again participated in the IFA Shield, defeating Maharana Club 2–1 in the first round on 5 September with goals from Rashid Chunna and SA Jamman Mukta, before drawing the first two matches against Bally Protiva Club and losing the third replay 0–3 on 12 September.

On 14 August 1957, Wanderers tied 1–1 with Police AC to gain joint ownership of the Independence Day Tournament. However, their league dominance was finally put to an end by arch-rivals, Mohammedan, who won their maiden First Division title that year. In 1958, the club withdrew mid-season after disagreements with the EPSF over the association's handling of league fixtures. On 23 August 1959, the club jointly won the Ronaldshay Shield alongside Lahore's Rangers Club, playing out a goalless draw in the final held at the Dhaka Stadium. Wanderers earned the right to keep the trophy for the first six months through a coin toss.

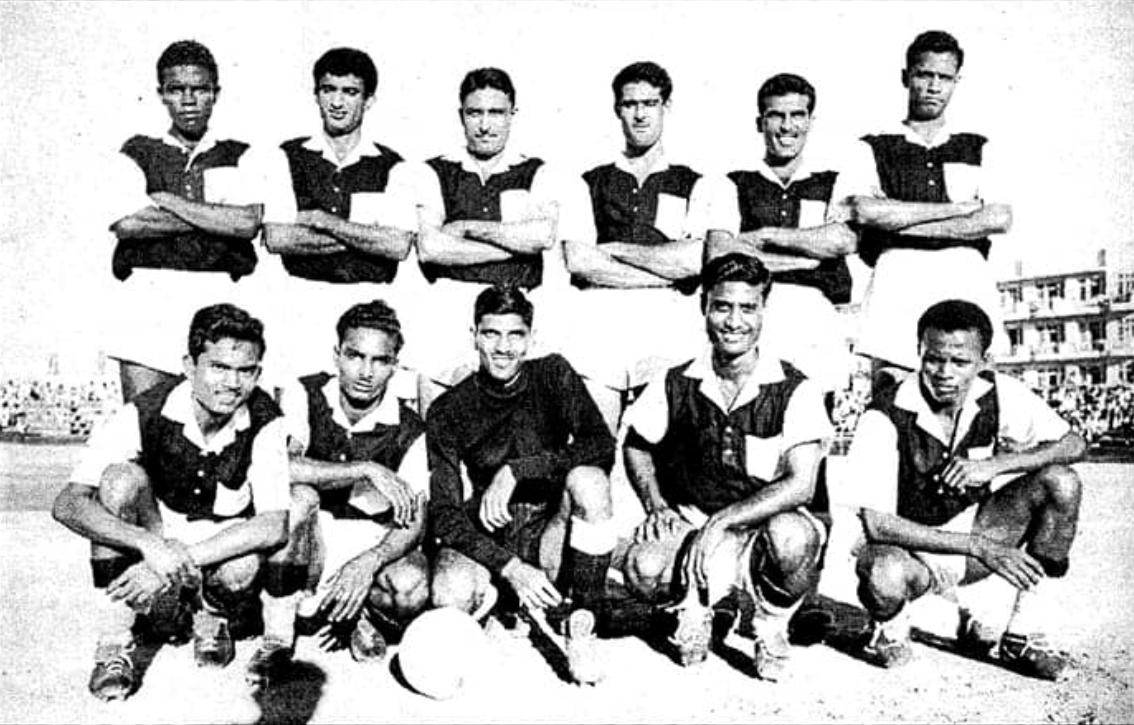
Dhaka Wanderers Club at the 1961 President's Gold Cup in Karachi

In 1960, Wanderers brought in Makrani players Lari and Murad Bakhsh, while also having a strong local contingent of Zakaria Pintoo, Patrick, Sekander Ali, Kazi Mobassar Hossain, Mari Chowdhury and Debinash Sangma. Other notable players included Rasool Bakhsh, Abdul Gafur Baloch, Muhammad Yaqub, Leo Gomes and Ghulam Rabbani. Eventually, the team, coached by Abdur Rahim and captained by Manzur Hasan Mintu, won their seventh First Division League title. In the single league, the club scored 61 goals in 14 games, only losing their final league game to the defending champions, Mohammedan. On 9 September 1960, the club were defeated 8–0 by Indonesian club PSM Makassar in the semi-finals of the Aga Khan Gold Cup in Dhaka. In 1961, the club participated in the President's Gold Cup held in Karachi. In the same year, Wajeed Ali Miazi was made the club's general secretary. However, the club failed to defend the league title, which was won by Mohammedan.

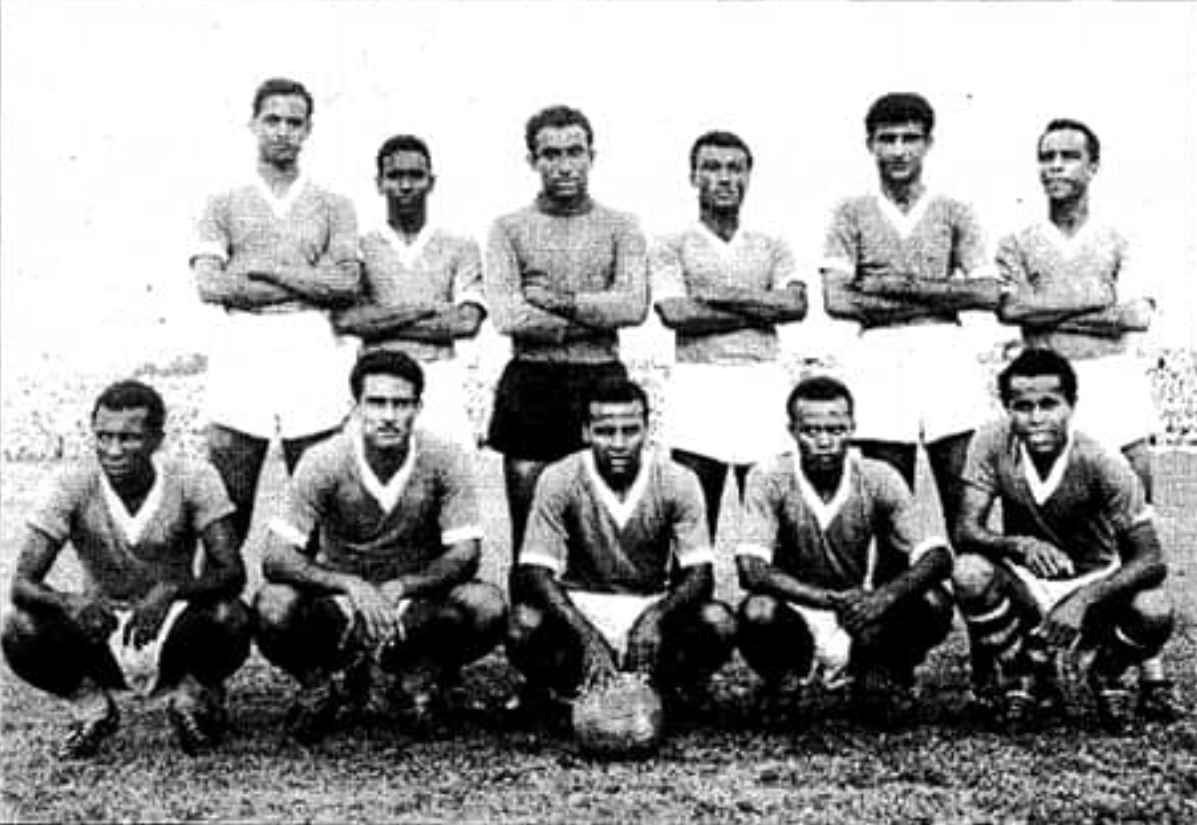
1963 Independence Day Tournament joint-winners Dhaka Wanderers Club

The following season, the club disappointed, culminating in a 1–8 defeat to eventual league champions, Victoria Sporting Club.The club formed a strong team to participate in the 1963 Aga Khan Gold Cup, acquiring Muhammad Umer, Ghulam Abbas Baloch, Abdul Ghafoor, Ghulam Hossain, Abdullah Rahi, Yousuf Jr., and Yousuf Sr. from defending champions Victoria, who had refused to partake in the tournament. Wanderers got off to a good start by defeating Police AC and Nepal XI 7–0, and Pakistan Western Railway 2–0. The club finished as group champions and went on to defeat Indonesia XI 5–0 in the semi-final. In the final, held on 29 October 1963, tournament favorites Wanderers lost 1–2 to Pakistan Western Railway. The Wanderers' starting eleven for the game consisted of Ghulam Hossain, Khuda Bakhsh, Abdul Gafur Baloch, Amin, Murad Bakhsh, Abdul Ghafoor, Yousuf Sr., Yousuf Jr., Abdullah Rahi, Abbas, and Umer, the latter being their only scorer in the final.

In 1965, Wanderers moved their club tent near the Baitul Mukarram Mosque, angering local residents who set the tent ablaze, resulting in the loss of most of their trophies and documents. In 1966, the club's general secretary, Wajeed Ali, was made vice-president, while Aga Yousuf served as the president. That year, Wanderers signed Muhammad Umer and Ghulam Abbas Baloch from Victoria on a permanent deal. On 7 July 1966, the club lost 0–2 to Mohammedan in the All-Pakistan Mohammad Ali Bogra Memorial Tournament final held in Rawalpindi. The club also finished in third-place behind Mohammedan and EPIDC in the league. On 17 July, Wanderers played their derby match against Mohammedan and lost 0–1. Notably, the game was played as a charity match and raised Rs. 31,968 from ticket sales, which were used to aid Sylhet flood victims. On 14 August, Wanderers played out a 1–1 draw with Mohammedan to be crowned joint Independence Day Tournament champions.

=== Steady decline (1966–1994) ===
In the late 60s, the club struggled to compete for the league title due to the presence of EPIDC and Mohammedan. They finished as league runners-up in 1970 after Mohammedan withdrew from the league mid-season. Following the Independence of Bangladesh, the club, led by Kazi Abdur Rafiq, again finished as runners-up in the league, this time jointly with Mohammedan and Dhaka Abahani in 1973. The season prior, which was abandoned, striker Nazir Ahmed scored a hat-trick against Dilkusha SC, becoming the first player to do so since the country's independence. Wanderers failed to form a strong team post-independence, even though one of their main patrons was the country's first president, Sheikh Mujibur Rahman. In 1976, the club managed to reach the Super League round in the First Division; however, they finished bottom of their group. In 1977, Wanderers finished second from the bottom and were only one point clear of the eventually relegated Shantinagar Club.

In 1980, Wajeed Ali Miazi, who had been with the club since 1939 and serving as general secretary for four years, departed. Eventually, the club moved their tent near the Motijheel police station. Following the Assassination of Sheikh Mujibur Rahman, and the onset of Military rule, the Wanderers, according to its officials at the time, were a victims to football politics. The club would spend the following decade as a mid-table side, while sometimes being tagged as "Giant Killers." In 1987, under coach and former player Abdul Hakim, the club reached the finals of the Federation Cup, where they were defeated 0–1 by former rivals, Mohammedan. In the 1989/90 season, Wanderers were penalized for match-fixing and also lost a relegation play-off match against Team BJMC, making the club Second Division bound. However, after the First Division was not held in 1991, the Bangladesh Football Federation decided against their relegation.

Notably, from 1986–1988 and again from 1990–1992, former club captain Manzur Hasan Mintu served as the club's general secretary. In 1992, Wanderers finished fourteenth in the twenty-club league and were initially safe from relegation. However, the club eventually lost their top-tier status at the start of the following year with the introduction of the new top-tier Premier Division League. The bottom 10 teams from the 1992 First Division League remained in the league, which began to serve below the Premier Division. In 1994, the club was relegated to the third-tier, the Second Division, marking an end to their 54-year stay in the First Division.

=== Yo-yo years (1994–2019) ===
In the 1996–97 season, the club finished runners-up in the Second Division and returned to the First Division. They finished fifth in their first season back in the First Division. However, they were once again relegated after finishing bottom of the league table with 4 points from 16 games in 1999. Eventually, the club returned to the First Division after finishing third in the 2001 Second Division League held in 2002, behind Sheikh Russel KC and East End Club, with 37 points from 17 games. In July 2002, Wanderers returned to the First Division and finished league champions in September, securing their return to the top-tier after a decade of absence.

The club entered the Premier Division in 2003–04 season, with general secretary Mohammed Selim, promising to form a strong team. Nevertheless, Wanderers finished seventh in the ten team league, five points clear of relegation. Notably, the Wanderers held defending champions and former rivals Mohammedan to a 1–1 draw. The club were eventually relegated from the Premier Division in 2005, finishing eight with 13 points from 18 games. On 20 September 2005, the club formed a two-member inquiry committee including vice-president Mohammad Mohon and hockey secretary Mohammad Kamrul Islam Kismat in order to investigate their relegation. In 2007, the club appointed former captain and general secretary Manzur Hasan Mintu as their president.

In 2008, Wanderers began participating in the Senior Division League, a merger of the Premier and First Division, which served as the second tier below the country's first professional football league, the Bangladesh Premier League. The club finished sixth that season, led by their striker Hirok Joarder. In the following decade, with the introduction of the second-tier professional league, the Bangladesh Championship League, the Senior Division, now serving as the third tier, was only held five times. Eventually, the club finished runners-up in the 2018–19 season, securing their place in the professional second-tier league.

=== Casino scandal and reformation (2019–2023) ===
On 18 September 2019, Wanderers was among four clubs in Motijheel raided by the Bangladesh Police, who discovered an illegal casino operating within the club's premises. The club tent housed a variety of gambling activities, including casinos, gutters, gambling tokens, and lotteries. According to reports, the casino's activities were controlled by AKM Mominul Haque Sayeed, who was at the time a commissioner of Dhaka South City Corporation Ward-9. Molla Mohammad Abu Kawser, the club's president and also the president of Awami League's associate wing Swechasebak League, jointly ran the casino. On 26 September, seven cases were filed against Awami League leader and club director Enamul Haque Enu and his brother Rupon Bhuiyan. The brothers were eventually arrested on 13 January 2020. The club secretary Joy Gopal Sarkar, who allegedly began the gambling culture in the club in 2007, was arrested by the CID on 13 July 2020.

11 years ago a party rented the club auditorium. They used to pay 30 thousand rupees to the club every day for gambling. The investigation revealed that the rent increased to 50,000 per day within 2 years. An official said that this 'indoor game' was going on in the club with proper permission.

— Report made by Prothom Alo in October 2020.

Following the casino raid, president Molla Mohammad Abu Kawsar resigned citing personal reasons leading to vice-president Kazi Shahidullah Liton being nominated as the president and joint secretary Vipul Ghosh Shankar as the general secretary. With the Championship League being cancelled in the 2019–20 season due to the COVID-19 pandemic, Wanderers began participating in the second-tier professional league from the 2020–21 season. The club finished seventh during their first season in the Championship League with 7 victories from 22 games. In March 2021, it was revealed that the team's coach, Kamal Babu, paid Tk 18,000 to the footballers out of his own pocket, foregoing his own salary. Despite their struggles to participate in the league, the Bangladesh Football Federation had allegedly not yet paid the club their participation fee. Amid this challenging situation, a major football-related institution provided the club with a check for Rs 3 lakh.

On 15 September 2021, the club formed a 28-member executive committee, with Kazi Shahidullah Liton remaining as president, while Nizam Uddin Chowdhury Parvez and Kamal Hossain were elected as vice-president and general secretary, respectively. It was also revealed that Md Sumon Alam would serve as the club's football secretary. The club finished the 2021–22 season in ninth place and were only two points clear of relegation back to semi-professional football. The following season, under the coaching of Arman Hossain, Wanderers finished seventh, five points clear of relegation.

=== Premier League status (2023–present) ===
On 1 September 2023, the club premises were reopened after being under lockdown for almost four years. The club hired experienced coach Abu Yusuf and appointed long-time servant Jahid Hossain as club captain for the 2023–24 Championship League. They secured promotion to the Bangladesh Premier League as league runners-up after a goalless draw against Bff Elite Academy on 24 April 2024. This marked their return to the top flight after 19 years and their first-ever participation in the Premier League. On 29 July 2024, Kazi Shahidullah Liton was again elected as the club president following an uncontested election.

Following the Non-cooperation movement on 5 August 2024, Liton distanced himself from the club, prompting the formation of a new team for the Premier League under convener Abdus Salam. On 25 September 2024, less than two months after the previous committee's formation, BNP politician Abdus Salam and sports organizer Mahbubur Rahman Shahin were elected as the new club president and general secretary, respectively.

== Rivalries ==
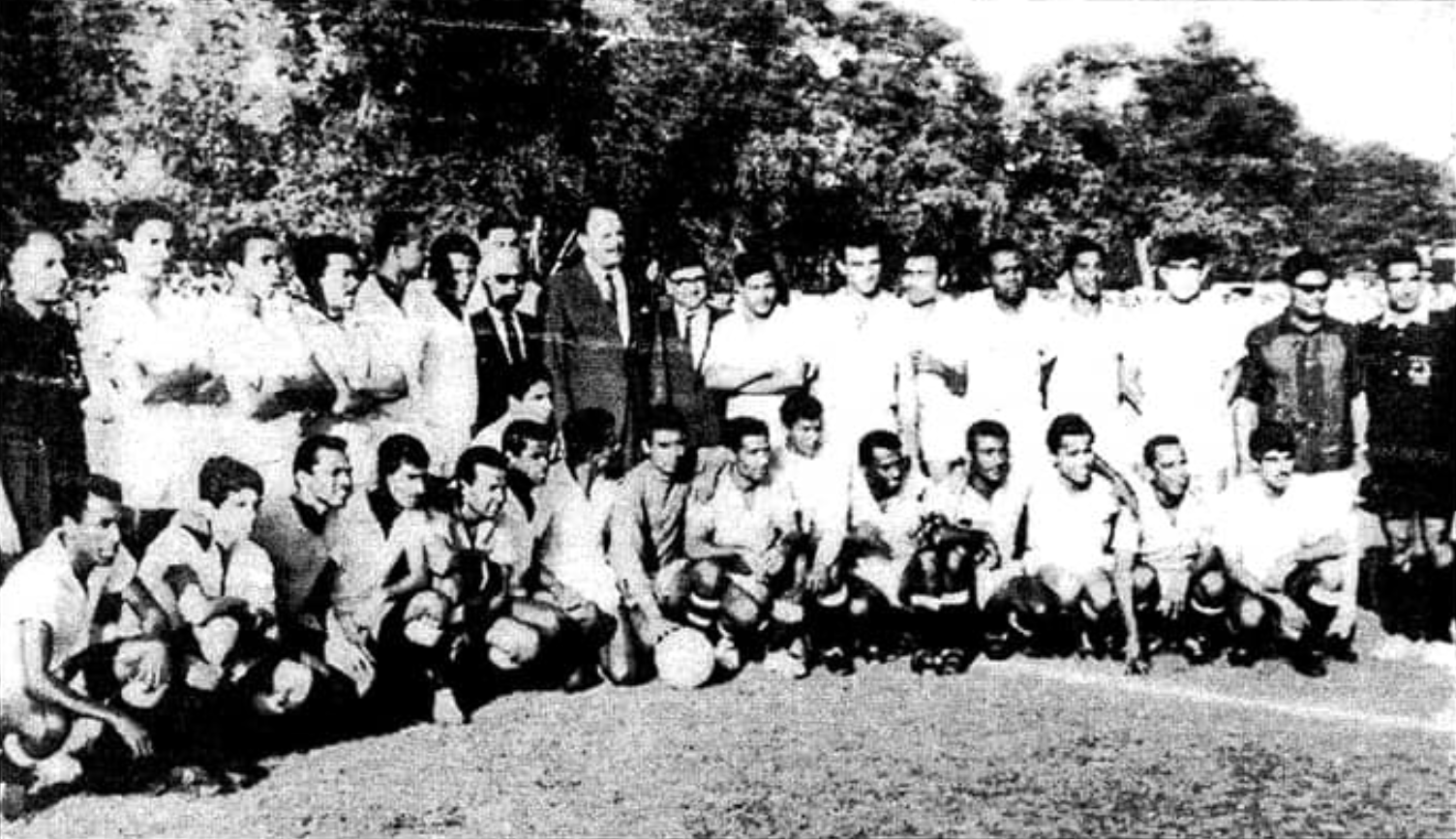
Ayub Khan, standing eighth from the left, with Dhaka Wanderers and Mohammedan players after the 1966 All-Pakistan Mohammad Ali Bogra Memorial Tournament final.

The club's main local rival is Dhaka Mohammedan. The rivalry dates back to 1956 when Mohammedan acquired numerous players from Dhaka Wanderers, who had left due to internal conflicts within their club. Despite this, Wanderers were crowned champions that year. Both clubs were tied on points, and Mohammedan's refusal to play a playoff final resulted in the league title being awarded to Wanderers. Following their final First Division title in 1960, the rest of the decade saw Mohammedan's dominance. Notably, Wanderers lost the All-Pakistan Mohammad Ali Bogra Memorial Tournament final in 1966, contested by the two Dhaka-based teams in Rawalpindi.

Prior to the Independence of Bangladesh, both clubs had won seven Dhaka First Division League titles. However, following the Bangladesh Liberation War, Wanderers struggled to compete with the financial power of EPIDC and Dhaka Abahani. Abahani eventually overtook Wanderers to become the country's second most successful club with 11 First Division titles, behind Mohammedan's 19. This placed Wanderers as the third most successful club in the country.

In 1972, Wanderers faced Abahani in the first league season following the country's independence. The match, where Abahani led 1-0, was suspended after Wanderers supporters entered the field and attacked the opposition players with wooden sticks. However, the club's fan base soon diminished with the rise of popular teams such as Abahani, Brothers Union, and Muktijoddha Sangsad KC in the late 70s and early 80s.

Since the introduction of the top-tier professional league, Wanderers waited 19 years to face their rivals once more. Following the club's promotion from the 2023–24 Championship League, they faced Mohammedan in the opening league game of the 2024–25 Premier League season on 29 November 2024, losing 0–6.

== Current squad ==
As of September 2026

Note: Flags indicate national team as defined under FIFA eligibility rules; some limited exceptions apply. Players may hold more than one non-FIFA nationality.

No.	Pos.	Nation	Player
1	GK	BAN	Mohiuddin Ranu
2	DF	BAN	Monir Hossain
3	DF	BAN	Shakil Ahmed
5	DF	CMR	Obono Biloa
7	MF	BAN	Abu Shaeid
8	MF	BAN	Mahadud Fahim
9	FW	BAN	Mannaf Rabby
10	MF	AUS	Angus Bailey
11	MF	NEP	Yubraj Dhakal
12	FW	BAN	Shawon Ritchil
13	MF	BAN	Tariqul Islam
16	FW	BAN	Jobayer Ahmed
17	FW	BAN	Md Mahid Sheikh
19	MF	BAN	Akkas Ali
20	DF	BAN	Munna Ahmed
21	DF	BAN	Rasedul Islam Rased
22	GK	BAN	Md Jasim Uddin
24	GK	NEP	Saurav Bikram Karki

No.	Pos.	Nation	Player
25	DF	BAN	Md Apon Shorker
26	MF	BAN	Md Jamim Hossain
27	MF	BAN	Akash Ahammed
30	FW	BAN	Rony Mia
31	DF	BAN	Tanvirul Islam
34	FW	BAN	Rafayatullah Mashrafi
35	FW	BAN	Tashib Bepari
35	FW	BAN	Maruf Himel
40	GK	BAN	Md Tanvir Ahamed
41	DF	BAN	Mohammad Asif
45	FW	IDN	Usman Diarra
55	FW	BAN	Arifur Rahman Raju
66	MF	BAN	Jahid Hossain
77	FW	BAN	Md Rayhan
80	FW	BAN	Redwan Hussein
81	FW	BAN	Md Sozib Uddin
99	MF	BAN	Hemanta Vincent Biswas

== Current technical staff ==
=== Coaching staff ===
As of 21 November 2026

Position	Name
Head coach	(Nepal) Prajwal Pratip Chetri
Team manager	(Bangladesh) MA Jalil
Assistant manager	(Bangladesh) Rashed Hossain Biplob
Goalkeeping coach	(Nepal) Deepak Damase
Team official	(Bangladesh) Md Salim

=== Board of directors ===
As of 21 November 2026

Position	Name
President	(Bangladesh) Mohammad Abdus Salam
General secretary	(Bangladesh) Mahbubur Rahman Shahin
General secretary	(Bangladesh) Md Mezbaha Uddin Mezu
Treasurer	(Bangladesh) MA Jalil

== Team records ==
=== Head coach's record ===
As of 20 November 2026

Head Coach	From	To	P	W	D	L	GS	GA	%W
(Bangladesh) Mashiur Rahman	20 February 2021	25 December 2021	22	7	6	9	22	28	31.82
(Bangladesh) Ekramur Rahman Rana	10 January 2022	13 June 2022	22	6	7	9	26	34	27.27
(Bangladesh) Md Arman Hossain	7 November 2022	19 April 2023	20	6	6	8	26	27	30.00
(Bangladesh) Abu Yusuf	24 February 2024	1 May 2024	14	6	6	2	17	8	42.86
(Bangladesh) Shahadat Hossain	1 November 2024	16 April 2025	15	1	1	13	7	56	6.67
(Bangladesh) Tajuddin Taju	17 April 2025	29 May 2025	6	2	0	4	5	11	33.33
(France) Laurent Anies	24 January 2026	7 May 2026	18	8	5	5	25	18	44.44
(Bangladesh) Asaduzzaman Asad	18 September 2026	24 October 2026	6	0	1	5	4	25	0.00
(Nepal) Prajwal Pratap Chetri	20 November 2026	Present	0	0	0	0	0	0	—

== Season by season record ==
Record as Professional Football League member
Season	Division	League								Federation Cup	Independence Cup	Asian club competition	Top league scorer(s)	
Season	Division	P	W	D	L	GF	GA	Pts	Position	Federation Cup	Independence Cup	Asian club competition	Player	Goals
2019–20	BCL	Cancelled								DNP	DNP	—	—	—
2020–21	BCL	22	7	6	9	22	28	27	6th	DNP	DNP	—	(Bangladesh) Md Jewel Mia	4
2021–22	BCL	22	6	7	9	26	34	25	6th	DNP	DNP	—		
2022–23	BCL	20	6	6	7	26	27	24	7th	DNP	DNP	—	(Bangladesh) Sourov Dewan	10
2023–24	BCL	14	6	6	2	17	8	24	Runners-up	DNP	DNP	—	(Bangladesh) Imran H. Pappu	6

Champions	Runners-up	Promoted	Relegated

== Honours ==
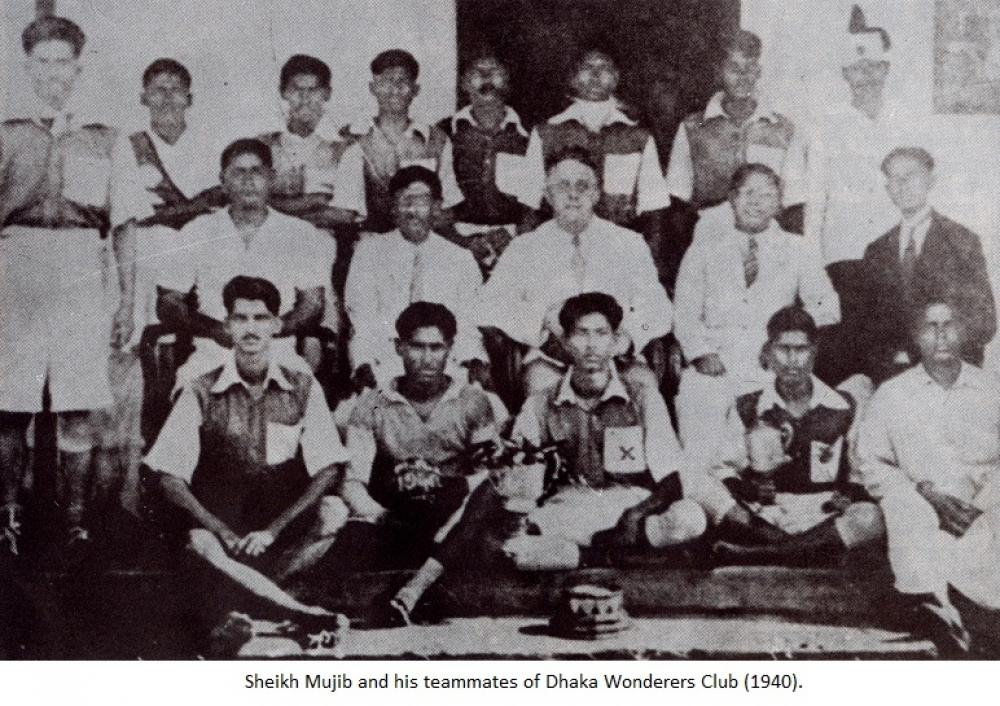
1940 Bogura Cup winning Dhaka Wanderers team, captained by Sheikh Mujibur Rahman.

=== League ===
- Dhaka First Division League (level 1)
  - Champions (7): 1950, 1951, 1953, 1954, 1955, 1956, 1960
  - Runners-up (7): 1949, 1952, 1957, 1959, 1963, 1966, 1970
- Dhaka First Division League (level 2)
  - Champions (1): 2002
- Bangladesh Championship League
  - Runners-up (1): 2023–24
- Dhaka Senior Division League (level 3)
  - Runners-up (1): 2018–19
- Dhaka Second Division League (level 3)
  - Runners-up (1): 1996

=== Cup ===
- Ronaldshay Shield
  - Champions (2): 1949, 1959
- Independence Day Tournament
  - Champions (4): 1955, 1957, 1963, 1966
  - Runners-up (1): 1960
- Aga Khan Gold Cup (Note: The competition is widely regarded as the predecessor of AFC Champions League (held for the first time in 1967), since it was the first organized international competition that involved club teams around Asia, organized by the football authorities of East Pakistan, in collaboration with Asian Football Confederation (AFC).)
  - Runners-up (1): 1963
- All-Pakistan Mohammad Ali Bogra Memorial Tournament
  - Runners-up (1): 1966
- Federation Cup
  - Runners-up (1): 1987

== Notable players ==
- (Pakistan) Wajeed Ali Miazi (1939–63)
- (Pakistan) Sheikh Shaheb Ali (1948–51)
- (Pakistan) Abdur Rahim (1948–52; 1953–56)
- (Pakistan) Fazlur Rahman Arzu (1953–1956)
- (Pakistan) Ghulam Rabbani (1959–65)
- (Pakistan) Kabir Ahmed (1955)
- (Pakistan) Amir Jang Ghaznavi (1954–56)
- (Pakistan) Nabi Chowdhury (1954–57)
- (Pakistan) Manzur Hasan Mintu (1958–64)
- (Pakistan) Mari Chowdhury (1959–60)
- (Pakistan) Gafur Baloch (1959–65; 1969–71)
- (Pakistan) Muhammad Yaqub (1960–62)
- (Pakistan) Abdullah Rahi (1963)
- (Pakistan) Abdul Ghafoor (1963)
- (Pakistan) Yousuf Sr. (1963)
- (Pakistan) Murad Bakhsh (1960–63)
- (Pakistan) Abdul Jabbar (1960s)
- (Sri Lanka) P.D. Sirisena (1963; 1965)
- (Pakistan) Muhammad Umer (1963; 1966)
- (Pakistan) Hussain Killer (1966)
- (Pakistan) Lal Muhammad Khamisa (1966)
- (Pakistan) Ghulam Abbas Baloch (1963; 1966)
- (India) Mohammed Rahmatullah (1965–66)
- (Pakistan) Hafizuddin Ahmed (1966–67)
- (Pakistan) Moosa Ghazi (1970)
- (Nepal) Ganesh Thapa (1983)

== Other departments ==
=== Field hockey ===
Dhaka Wanderers Club has a field hockey team that competes in the First Division Hockey League, the second tier of Bangladeshi hockey. The club was relegated from the top-tier Premier Division in 2018. In that season, they finished at the bottom of the league with 10 losses and just 1 point from 11 matches.

=== Swimming ===
The club, unlike most sports clubs in Bangladesh, has a swimming team. In 2017, the team won 18 gold medals in the Inter-club Swimming Competition held in Chittagong. However, due to the lack of regular swimming competitions in the country, the club rarely invests in the team.

=== Kabaddi ===
The club's Kabaddi team participates in the Premier Division Kabaddi League. In 2008, the Wanderers formed a women's team to participate in the Exim Bank Women's Kabaddi Tournament.

== See also ==
- List of football clubs in Bangladesh
- History of football in Bangladesh
