= Muhammad Umer =

Pakistani footballer (1935–2004)

Muhammad Umer TI FIFAOM
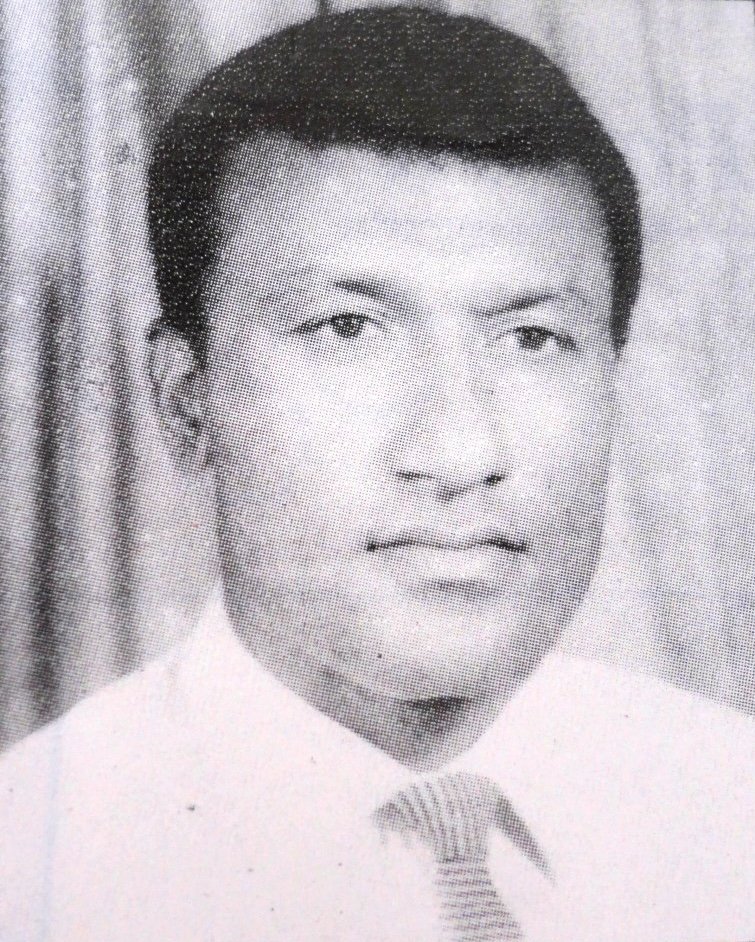
- Umer during his playing days

Personal information
- Full name: Muhammad Umer Baloch
- Date of birth: 1935
- Place of birth: Lyari, Karachi, British India
- Date of death: 21 March 2004 (aged 69)
- Place of death: Karachi, Pakistan
- Position: Striker

Youth career
- 1948: Qadri Sports
- 1950: Haroon Sons

Senior career*
Years	Team	Apps	(Gls)
1953–??	KMC		
1956–1960	Kolkata Mohammedan		
1961–1965	Victoria	56+	(93+)
1966	Dacca Wanderers	17	(20)
1967–1968	KMC		
1969	Dilkusha	14	(9)
1970–??	KMC		

International career
1956–1965	Pakistan		(18)
- * Club domestic league appearances and goals

Muhammad Umer Baloch (Note: Name variously transliterated as Umar, Omer, and Omar in historical sources.) TI FIFAOM (Urdu: محمد عمر بلوچ; 1935 – 21 March 2004), popularly known as Captain Umer, was a Pakistani professional footballer who played as a striker. Renowned for his goal-scoring abilities, prolific finishing, and hat-tricks, he is widely considered as one of the greatest Pakistani footballers of all time. Since 1965, Umer is the all-time top goalscorer of the Pakistan national team with 18 goals.

Starting his sport career in clubs in Karachi, Umer later represented Kolkata Mohammedan in the late 1950s. In his first year, he became the Calcutta League's top scorer, while also guiding Mohammedan to the title, also captaining the side to win the 1960 Aga Khan Gold Cup. He continued his professional career in various clubs in East Pakistan, winning various titles across his spells. Despite the fact that most of his goals are unregistered, Umer has reportedly scored around 1,000 goals in domestic football.

Umer represented the Pakistan national football team from 1956 to 1965, and was the country's 13th international captain. He also represented Pakistan at the 1958 Tokyo Asian Games. Under his captaincy, he helped the side finish runner-ups at the 1962 Merdeka Tournament.

In recognition of his contributions to the sport of football, Umer was honored with the Tamgha-e-Imtiaz in 1989. In 2004, a few months after his death he was awarded the FIFA Order of Merit, the highest honour awarded by FIFA.

== Early life ==
Umer was born in Gul Muhammad Lane, in the Lyari locality of Karachi in 1935. He belonged to the Makrani Baloch community (also known as Sheedi) of African descent. Initially rising through the ranks from school football, Umer began his career in 1948, aged 13, as a goalkeeper for Karachi-based Qadri Sports. However, his attacking ability soon saw him convert into a centre-forward, eventually earning the nickname "Black Horse".

== Club career ==
=== Early career ===
In 1950, Umer debuted for Haroon Sons in Karachi's Abu Bakr Tournament against Quetta. In 1953, he joined the Karachi Municipal Corporation football team for which he remained for the ensuing years. In 1954, he toured southern India with Friends Union as a guest player under the captaicy of Taj Mohammad Jr.. At the 1954 Rovers Cup in India, Umer went on another Indian tour with Keamari Union as guest player, finishing runners-up to Hyderabad Police. During the tournament, he also scored eight goals in a single game in a 9–0 victory over an Love–Veer Club of India.

Umer earned a spot on Karachi team for the National Football Championship in 1955 held in Bahawalpur. He made another tour with Karachi Kickers in India in 1955 under the captaincy of Dad Muhammad, earning acclaim for scoring six goals in a game in Ernakulam and achieving a hat-trick in Mysore.

=== Kolkata Mohammedan ===
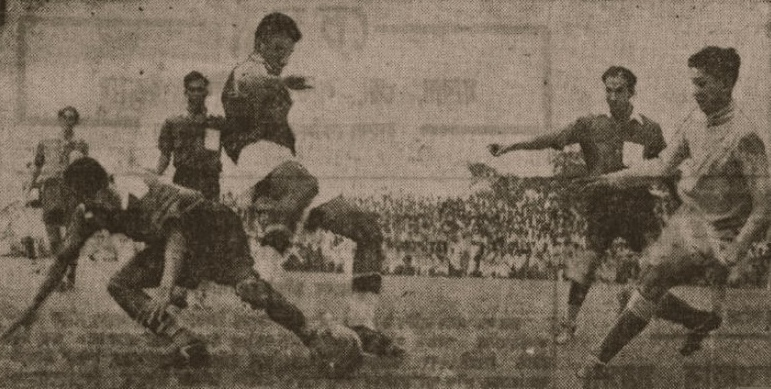
Nikhil Nandy (L) tackling Umer during a 1956 Calcutta League match between Mohammedan SC & Eastern Railway

In 1956, Umer was recruited by Calcutta League club Kolkata Mohammedan. The following year, he became the league's top goal-scorer, while also guiding Mohammedan to the title. The same year, he helped the team win the Rovers Cup, notably scoring a hat-trick in the quarter-finals against Burmah-Shell Sports Club, along with a goal in the final against Mohun Bagan.

In 1958, Umer played a key role in securing the DCM Trophy for the club, even scoring in the final. He also contributed to the team's runners-up position at the 1959 Durand Cup, as well as finding the net in the replayed final.

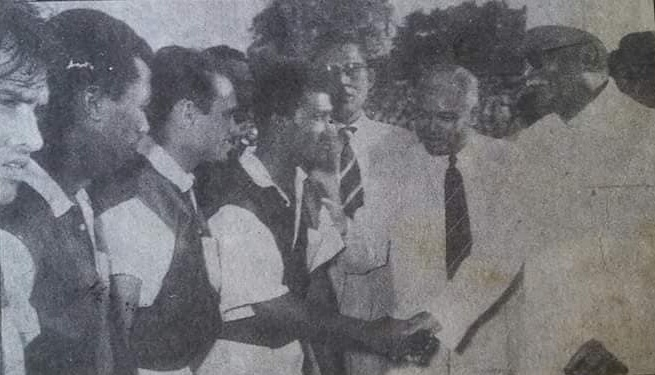
Umer meeting with Rajendra Prasad

In 1960, Mohammedan captained by Umer, won the 1960 Aga Khan Gold Cup held in Dhaka, East Pakistan (now Bangladesh), where they defeated Indonesian club PSM Makassar 4–1 in the final, with Umer scoring a brace.

Umer enjoyed star status during his stay in India, and featured in several magazine headlines and advertisements of companies in the country media. He was admired by then Indian prime minister Jawaharlal Nehru and Bollywood actor Dilip Kumar, who reportedly insisted Umer to stay in India, although in the end he left Mohammedan in the early 1960s and returned to Pakistan.

=== Victoria SC ===
In 1961, Umer returned to Pakistan joining East Pakistan-based Victoria Sporting Club. During his stay in the Dhaka League, he also represented Dacca Division at the National Football Championship.

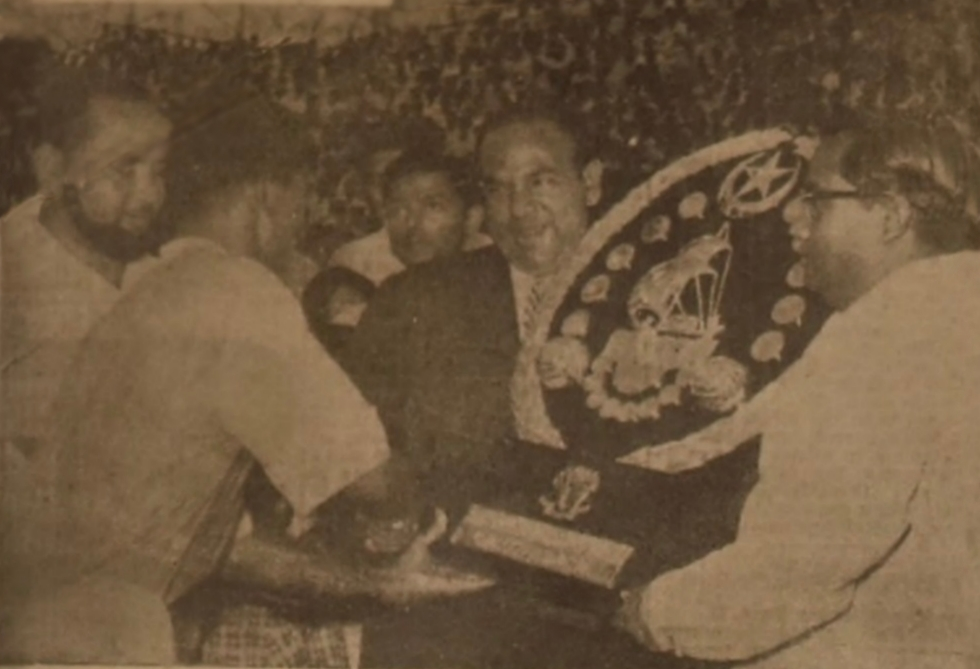
Umer (left), receiving the Independence Day Football Tournament trophy.

Umer led Victoria to both the Dhaka First Division League and the 1962 Aga Khan Gold Cup as coach-cum-captain, scoring 27 goals in the league. He also scored twice as Victoria triumphed 5–1 over Young Taegeuk FA in the Aga Khan Gold Cup final. Umer also won the National Championship with Dacca Division in both the 1961–62 and 1962 seasons, notably scoring in both finals respectively, and captaining the team in the latter. On 1 July 1964, Umer set up a scoring record, after netting 10 of the 13 goals against Wari Club Dhaka in the First Division in a 13–0 victory.

In 1963, Dhaka Wanderers formed a strong team to participate in the Aga Khan Gold Cup, acquiring Umer along with national teammates Ghulam Abbas Baloch, Abdul Ghafoor, Abdullah Rahi, Yousuf Jr., and Yousuf Sr. from defending champions Victoria, who had withdrawn from the tournament. After defeating Police AC, Nepal XI, Pakistan Eastern Railway and Indonesia XI in the semi-final, the club eventually lost 1–2 to Pakistan Western Railways, with Umer being the only scorer in the final.

On August 14, he represented the team in the Independence Day Football Tournament final against Dhaka Mohammedan, receiving a red card after deliberately stomping on Mohammedan goalkeeper Balai Dey as both teams shared the trophy.

=== Dhaka Wanderers ===
In 1966, he joined Dhaka Wanderers on permanent basis and was given the club's captaincy.

=== Later years ===
In the 1960s, Umer was still playing with his departmental team KMC while subsequently playing for clubs in India and East Pakistan. In 1967, he won the All-Pakistan Mohammad Ali Bogra Tournament with the team after defeating Dhaka Mohammedan in the final. Umer also represented the Karachi Division selection at the National Football Championship. In the 1969 edition, Umer helped the team secure a runners-up position, scoring in all three group stage matches. He also scored against Quetta Division and Pakistan Army in the quarter-finals and semi-finals, and scored his teams lone goal in the final.

In 1969, he also played for Dilkusha, helping them secure a runners-up position in the league. He played for KMC until his eventual retirement as player in the 1970s.

== International career ==
=== Early years (1956–1960) ===
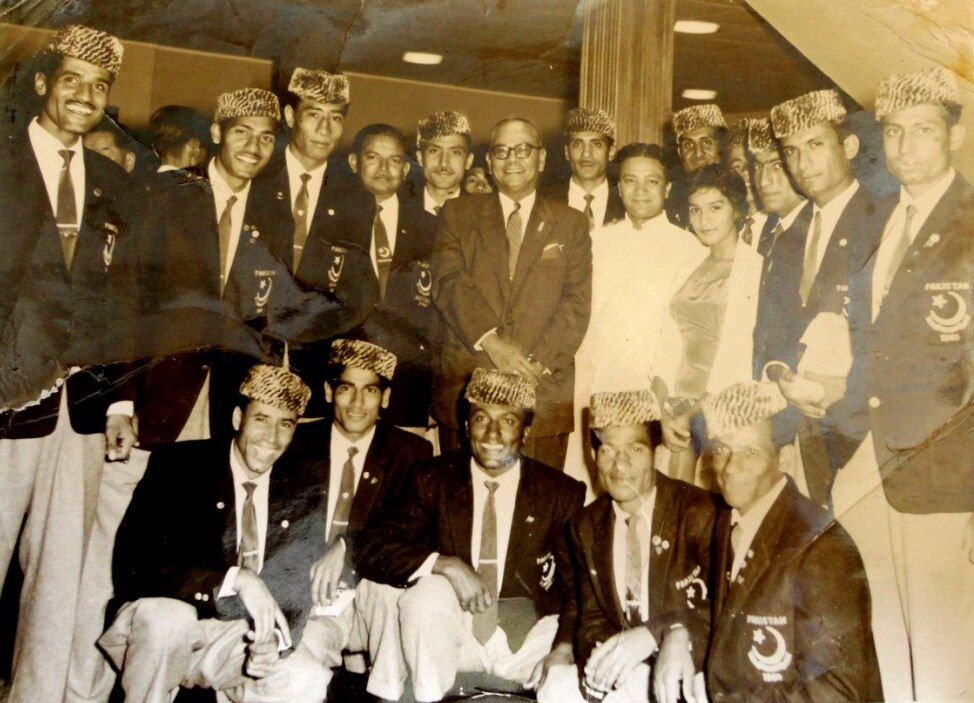
Pakistan national team at the 1960 Merdeka Tournament. Umer sitting in the middle

Umer first toured with the Pakistan national team to Sri Lanka, Singapore, and China in 1956. He later represented Pakistan at the 1958 Tokyo Asian Games. In 1959, he participated in the tour to Burma and the 1960 AFC Asian Cup qualifiers, where he scored a hat-trick against Iran in a 4–1 victory. He also managed to score during a 2–2 draw with Israel. The qualifying tournament held in Ernakulam, India, also saw Pakistan earn a notable victory over India, nonetheless, failed to qualify for the main stage, finishing third out of four teams. At the 1960 Merdeka Tournament, he scored twice in a record 7–0 win against Thailand and helped the team reach the semifinal where Pakistan lost to hosts Malaysia.

=== Captaincy (1962–1965) ===
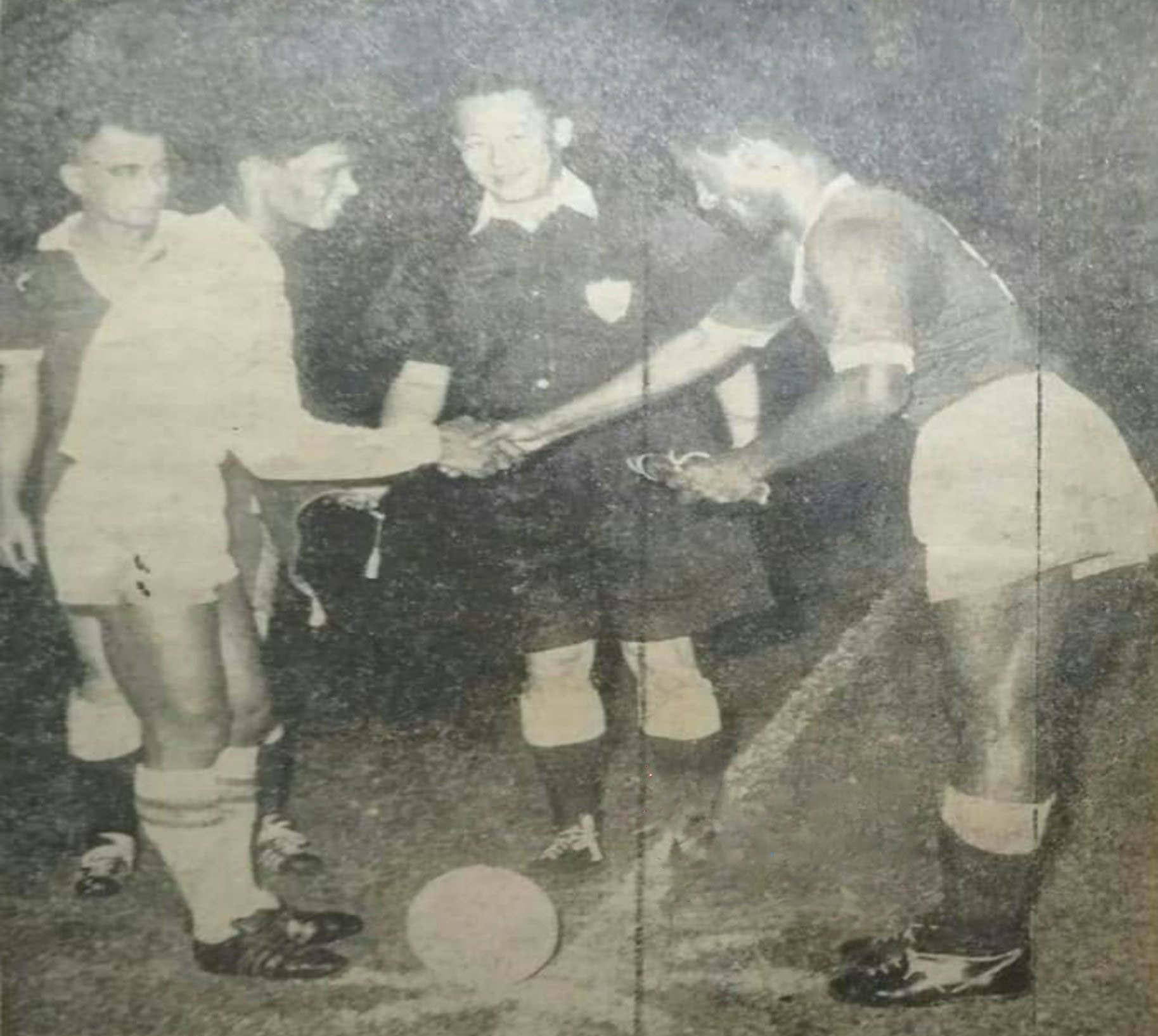
Umer with Burma national team captain Suk Bahadur (left) during the 1962 Merdeka Tournament

In the 1962 Merdeka Tournament, Pakistan reached the final under Umer's captaincy, ultimately losing to Indonesia. Umer also captained Pakistan during China's football tour in Pakistan in 1963. The first test in Dhaka in East Pakistan (now Bangladesh) ended in a 0–0 tie. The second match in Peshawar ended in a 3–2 victory for Umer's side, with the third fixture in Lahore ending in another 1–1 draw. The final fourth match in Karachi ended in a 2–0 defeat for Pakistan. Umer was suspended from the national team for the 1964 Summer Olympic Qualifiers, due to reporting late to training camp. However, he would return to the team for the tour to Ceylon, where he captained the side, scoring a goal in a 1–3 defeat against the Ceylon national team. He lastly captained the team at his last tour at the 1965 RCD Cup, where he scored in a 1–4 defeat against Iran in his last official match. After featuring in test matches against FC Alga from the Soviet Union in 1966, Umer was dropped in March 1967 due to his declining form attributed to age, ahead of a series of matches against a touring Saudi Arabia.

== Post-playing career ==
Following his retirement from playing, Umer continued his involvement in football as a coach. From 1971 to 1974, he served on Sindh's football selection committee while also coaching the Karachi Municipal Corporation from 1971 to 1985, and later the Karachi Water & Sewerage Board team. In recognition of his contributions to the sport, Umer was honored with the Tamgha-e-Imtiaz in 1989.

== Personal life and death ==
Umer's sons Farooq Umer and Tariq Umer were also footballers. Umer, who spent most his final decades in abject poverty, died on 21 March 2004. He was buried at the Mewa Shah graveyard in Karachi. A few months later, FIFA reportedly decided to award Umer with the FIFA Order of Merit in recognition of his contributions to football. The award was to be presented to his family by Pakistan Football Federation president Faisal Saleh Hayat.

== Career statistics ==
=== Club ===
Appearances and goals by club, season, and competition. Only official games are included in this table.
Club	Season	League		Cup		Aga Khan Gold Cup		Total	
Club	Season	Apps	Goals	Apps	Goals	Apps	Goals	Apps	Goals
Victoria	1961	??	??	??	??	??	??	??	??
Victoria	1962	20	27	1	3	5	14	27	44
Victoria	1963	14	20	3	4	0	0	17	24
Victoria	1964	14	32	4	11	2	1	20	44
Victoria	1965	11	16	0	0	0	0	11	16
Dacca Wanderers	1963	0	0	1	0	5	8	6	8
Dacca Wanderers	1966	17	20	2	2	2	0	21	22
Dilkusha	1969	14	9	3	4	0	0	17	13
Dilkusha	Total	90	121	14	24	14	23	118	171

=== International goals ===
Scores and results list Pakistan's goal tally first, score column indicates score after each Umer goal.

List of international goals scored by Muhammad Umer
No.	Date	Venue	Opponent	Score	Result	Competition	Ref.
1	26 August 1956	Government Services Ground, Colombo, Ceylon	Ceylon	5–3	5–3	Friendly	
2	1 September 1956	Government Services Ground, Colombo, Ceylon	Ceylon	2–2	2–2	Friendly	
3	14 May 1958	Stadium Merdeka, Kuala Lumpur, Federation of Malaya	Malaya	1–2	2–4	Friendly	
4	17 May 1958	Jalan Besar Stadium, Kallang, Singapore	Singapore	1–0	4–4	Friendly	
5	17 May 1958	Jalan Besar Stadium, Kallang, Singapore	Singapore	3–3	4–4	Friendly	
6	17 May 1958	Jalan Besar Stadium, Kallang, Singapore	Singapore	4–3	4–4	Friendly	
7	27 May 1958	Korakuen Velodrome, Tokyo, Japan	Taiwan	1–0	1–3	1958 Asian Games	
8	24 April 1959	Aung San Stadium, Rangoon, Burma	Burma	1–0	3–2	Friendly	
9	24 April 1959	Aung San Stadium, Rangoon, Burma	Burma	3–2	3–2	Friendly	
10	9 December 1959	Maharaja's College Stadium, Ernakulam, India	Iran	1–1	4–1	1960 AFC Asian Cup qualification	
11	9 December 1959	Maharaja's College Stadium, Ernakulam, India	Iran	3–1	4–1	1960 AFC Asian Cup qualification	
12	9 December 1959	Maharaja's College Stadium, Ernakulam, India	Iran	4–1	4–1	1960 AFC Asian Cup qualification	
13	17 December 1959	Maharaja's College Stadium, Ernakulam, India	Israel	1–0	2–2	1960 AFC Asian Cup qualification	
14	5 August 1960	Stadium Merdeka, Kuala Lumpur, Federation of Malaya	Thailand	2–0	7–0	1960 Merdeka Tournament	
15	5 August 1960	Stadium Merdeka, Kuala Lumpur, Federation of Malaya	Thailand	3–0	7–0	1960 Merdeka Tournament	
16	30 January 1963	Peshawar, Pakistan	China		3–2	Friendly	
17	28 February 1965	Sugathadasa Stadium, Colombo, Ceylon	Ceylon	1–0	1–3	Friendly	
18	23 July 1965	Amjadieh Stadium, Tehran, Iran	Iran	1–4	1–4	1965 RCD Cup	

== Honours ==
Pakistan

- Merdeka Tournament
  - Runners-up (1): 1962

Karachi Kickers

- Sait Nagjee Football Tournament:
  - Winners (1): 1955

Kolkata Mohammedan

- Calcutta League:
  - Winners (1): 1957
  - Runners-up (1): 1960
- IFA Shield:
  - Winners (1): 1957
- Aga Khan Gold Cup:
  - Winners (1): 1960
- Durand Cup:
  - Runners-up (1): 1959
- Rovers Cup:
  - Winners (2): 1956, 1959
  - Runners-up: 1957, 1958
- DCM Trophy:
  - Winners (1): 1958
  - Runners-up (1): 1960

Victoria SC

- Dhaka First Division League:
  - Winners (2): 1962, 1964
  - Runners-up (1): 1961
- Aga Khan Gold Cup:
  - Winners (1): 1962
- Independence Day Football Tournament:
  - Winners (2): 1962, 1964
  - Runners-up (1): 1965

Dhaka Wanderers

- Independence Day Tournament:
  - Winners (1): 1963
- Aga Khan Gold Cup:
  - runners-up: 1963

Dacca Division

- National Football Championship:
  - Winners (2): 1961–62, 1962

Individual

- 1957 − Calcutta Football League top goal-scorer
- 1964 − Dhaka First Division League top goal-scorer: 32 (with Victoria SC)
- 1989 − Tamgha-e-Imtiaz
- 2004 − FIFA Order of Merit

== See also ==
- List of Pakistan national football team captains
- List of Pakistan national football team hat-tricks
- List of top international men's football goalscorers by country
