= Debinash Sangma =

Bangladeshi footballer

- Sangma post-retirement

Personal information
- Full name: Debinash Sangma
- Date of birth: 1936
- Place of birth: Dhobaura, Mymensingh District, British India (present-day Bangladesh)
- Date of death: 7 August 2005 (aged 75)
- Place of death: Dhaka, Bangladesh
- Position: Full-back

Senior career*
Years	Team	Apps	(Gls)
1958–1959	Mohammedan Sporting		
1960	Dacca Wanderers		
1961–1965	Mohammedan Sporting		
1966	Dacca Wanderers		
1967	Victoria		
1968–1969	Mohammedan Sporting		

International career
1962	Pakistan Youth		
1963	Pakistan	0	(0)
- * Club domestic league appearances and goals

Debinash Sangma (Bengali: দেবীনাশ সাংমা; 1936 – 7 August 2005) was a former Bangladeshi football player.

== Early life ==
Debinash was born in 1936 in Dhairpara village of Dhobaura Upazila in Mymensingh District, British India. He represented the Mymensingh District football team in the East Pakistan inter-district football tournaments starting in 1956.

== Club career ==
Debinash began his First Division career with Mohammedan SC, having three stints at the club from 1958 to 1959, 1961–1965, and 1968–1969. He won five league titles and three Aga Khan Gold Cup titles during these periods. Debinash also represented Dhaka Wanderers Club in 1966 and Victoria Sporting Club in 1967. Debinash also featured in the 1958 Rovers Cup held in Bombay as a guest player for Keamari Muhammadan.

=== Dacca Division ===
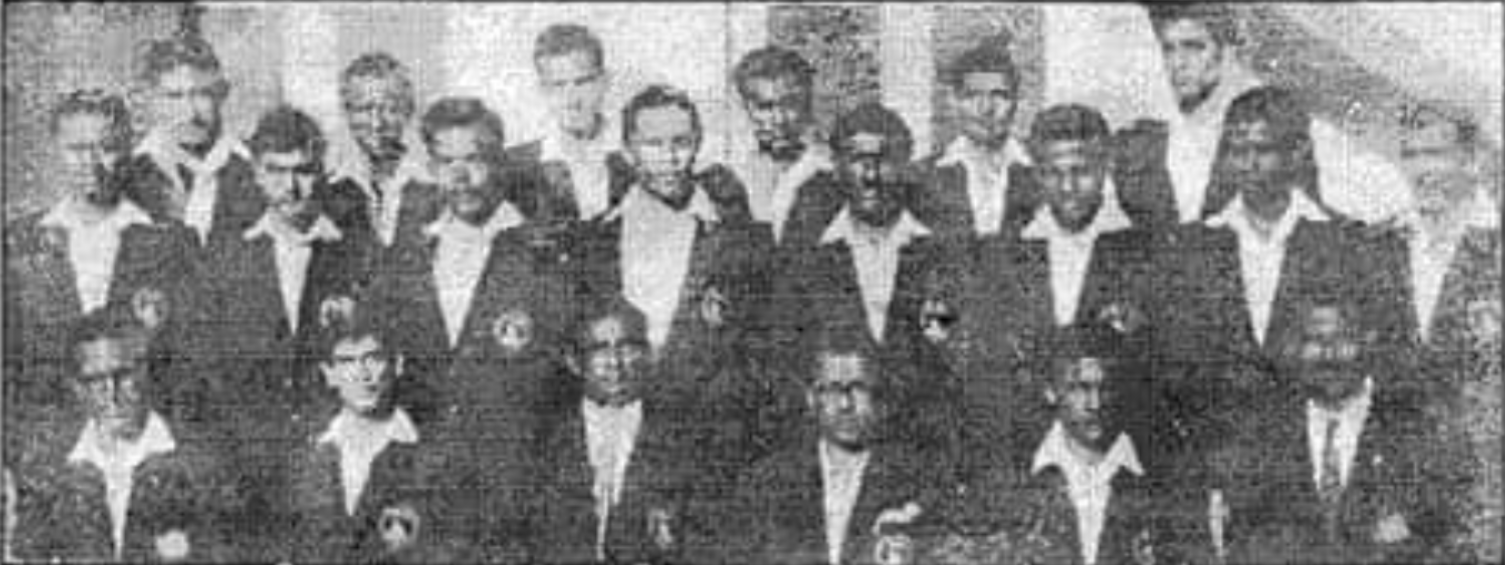
Debinash (third from left in the middle row) with the 1961 National Football Championship-winning Dhaka Division team.

Debinash represented Dacca Division in the National Football Championship from the 1961–62 edition. During the tournament, he was the only East Pakistani player to feature for the eventual champions. Debinash was also present in the team when Dacca defeated Karaci Blues 6–1 in the final held in Karachi. He was also part of the team that retained the title the following edition, defeating hosts Karachi 4–0.

== International career ==
Due to his performances in the National Championship, Debinash was selected in the Pakistan U19 that went on to participate in the 1962 AFC Youth Championship held in Bangkok, Thailand. The following year, he was the only East Pakistani player selected by coach, Sheikh Shaheb Ali, to represent the Pakistan national team at the 1964 Summer Olympics qualifiers. The team were knocked out of the qualifiers in the preliminary round after losing 2–4 to Iran on aggregate.

== Personal life ==
Following his retirement from football in 1969, Debinash began working as a salaried employee at the National Housing Authority.

== Death ==
Debinash, who had been suffering from bladder cancer since 1997, was critically ill and being treated at a local hospital. On 7 August 2005, Debinash died while receiving treatment at the Abir General Hospital in Dhaka. His body was buried in his native village, Dhairpara, in Dhobaura Upazila, Mymensingh District. He is survived by his wife and two sons.

== Honours ==
Mohammedan SC

- Dhaka First Division League: 1959, 1961, 1963, 1965, 1969
- Aga Khan Gold Cup: 1959, 1964, 1968
- Independence Day Cup: 1958, 1961, 1963

Dacca Division

- National Championship: 1961–62, 1962

== Bibliography ==
- Mahmud, Dulal (2014). পাকিস্তান জাতীয় দল বাঙালি খেলোয়াড় (transl. Bengali players in the Pakistan national team) (in Bengali). Bishhoshahitto Bhobon.
- Mahmud, Dulal (2020). খেলার মাঠে মুক্তিযুদ্ধ (transl. Liberation war in the playground) (in Bengali). Bishhoshahitto Bhobon. ISBN 978-984-8218-31-0.
- Alam, Masud (2017). ফুটবলের গল্প ফুটবলারদের গল্প (transl. The story of football the story of footballers) (in Bengali). Bishhoshahitto Bhobon. ISBN 9789849134688.
