= Abdul Ghafoor (footballer) =

Pakistani footballer

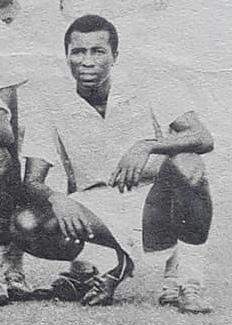
- Ghafoor with Victoria Sporting Club

Personal information
- Full name: Abdul Ghafoor
- Date of birth: 3 August 1938
- Place of birth: Karachi, Sind, British India
- Date of death: 7 September 2012 (aged 74)
- Place of death: Karachi, Pakistan
- Position: Midfielder

Senior career*
Years	Team	Apps	(Gls)
1957	Saifi Sports		
1958	Karachi Kickers		
1959	West Pakistan Government Press		
1960	Kolkata Mohammedan		
1961	Dhaka Mohammedan		
1962–1964	Victoria		
1965–1968	Dhaka Mohammedan		
1969	Dilkusha	20	(8)
1970	EPIDC		
1971–1976	Karachi Port Trust		
1977	Dhaka Mohammedan		

International career
1959–1974	Pakistan		
- * Club domestic league appearances and goals

Abdul Ghafoor (3 August 1938 – 7 September 2012), commonly known by his nickname Majna, was a Pakistani professional footballer who played as a midfielder. He captained the Pakistan national football team during the 1974 Asian Games. He was nicknamed the Pakistani Pelé and Black Pearl of Pakistan, for his resemblance to the Brazilian football player, Pelé, and his playing abilities, he is also regarded as one of the greatest Pakistani footballers of all time.

== Early life ==
Ghafoor was born in Saifi Lane, Baghdadi, a neighbourhood of Lyari in Karachi in British India on 3 August 1938. Belonging to the Sheedi community, his grandparents reportedly migrated from Africa and settled in Saifi Lane. Ghafoor was fond of football since early age, and often ran away during classes to nearby grounds to join boys playing football. Ghafoor claimed that he had to sell his school bags in order to buy sports shoes. He was popularly known by his nickname Majna.

== Club career ==
=== Early career ===
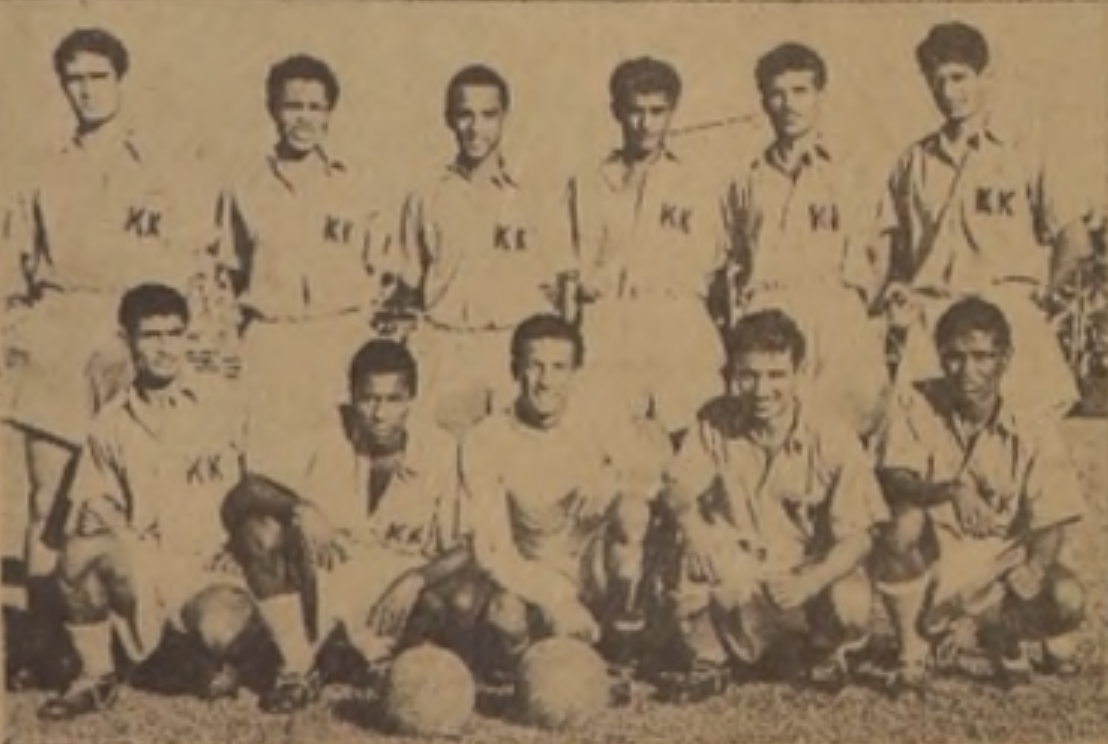
Ghafoor sitting second from the left with the 1958 Aga Khan Gold Cup winning Karachi Kickers team

Ghafoor began his football career in 1957, representing his local side Saifi Sports in Lyari.

In 1958, he led Karachi Kickers to victory in the Aga Khan Gold Cup. He also played in the 1959 All-Pakistan President's Cup for the West Pakistan Government Press. He represented Karachi selection team at the National Football Championship.

=== Kolkata Mohammedan ===
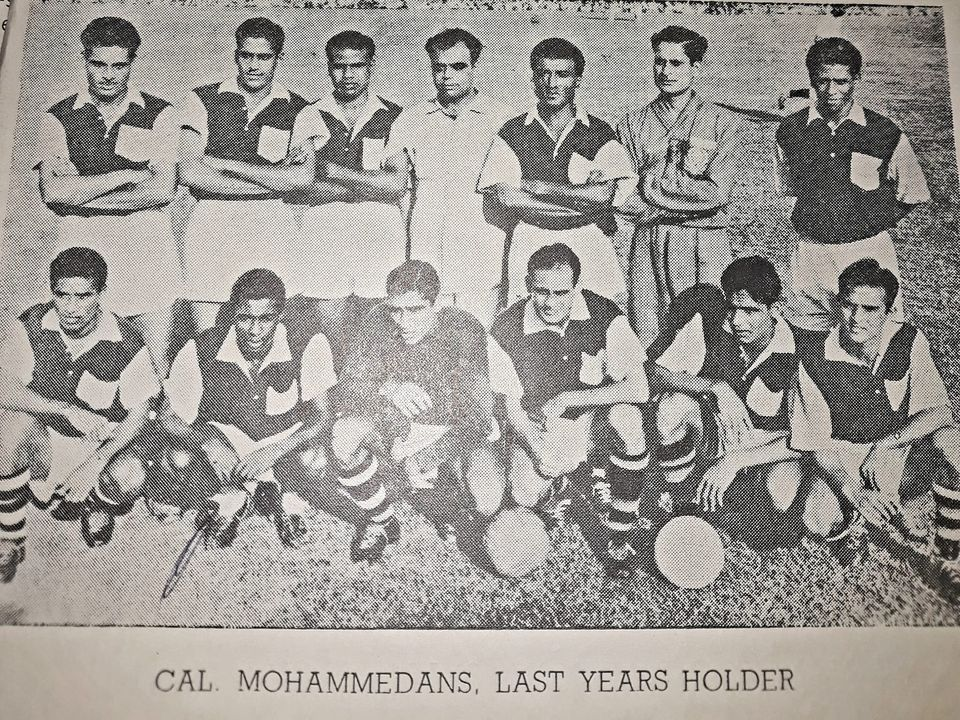
Ghafoor sitting second from the left with the 1960 Aga Khan Gold Cup winning Kolkata Mohammedan team

In 1960, Ghafoor was recommended by fellow national teammate and club captain Muhammad Umer to add more depth to the Mohammedan Sporting squad. The same year, Ghafoor played an influential role in the team's midfield, contributing to the team securing the 1960 Aga Khan Gold Cup.

=== Dhaka Mohammedan ===
In 1961, Ghafoor joined Dhaka Mohammedan. Helping them win the First Division League in his debut year with the team. Aside from the league, Ghafoor assisted the team to securing a runners-up spot in the 1961 edition of the Aga Khan Gold Cup.

During his stay in the Dhaka League, he also represented Dacca Division at the National Football Championship.

=== Victoria ===
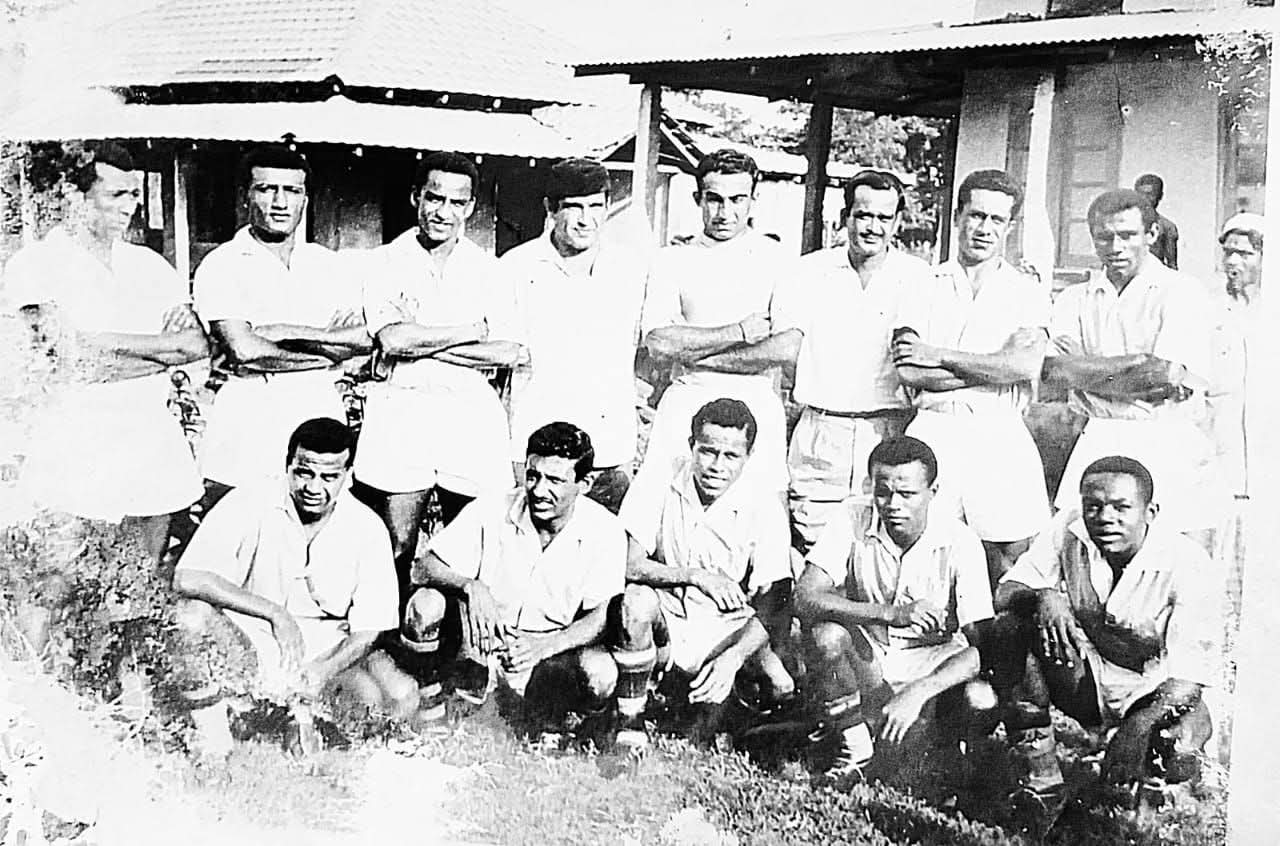
Ghafoor (extreme left, standing row) with Victoria in the 1960s.

After representing Dhaka Mohammedan, Ghafoor joined Victoria the following year, he represented them from 1962 to 1964. Where he won the Dacca League twice in 1962 and 1964. Ghafoor also won the 1962 Aga Khan Gold Cup with the club, scoring a free-kick in the final of the tournament.

=== Dhaka Wanderers ===
In 1963, Dhaka Wanderers formed a strong team to participate in the 1963 Aga Khan Gold Cup, acquiring Ghafoor along with national teammates Ghulam Abbas Baloch, Muhammad Umer, Abdullah Rahi, Yousuf Sr., and Yousuf Jr. from defending champions Victoria, who had withdrawn from the tournament. After defeating Police AC, Nepal XI, Pakistan Eastern Railway, and Indonesia XI in the semi-final, the club eventually lost 1–2 to Pakistan Railways in the final.

=== Dilkusha ===
In 1969, Dilkusha, who were a newly promoted side, acquired Ghafoor alongside his fellow teammates, the likes of Moosa Ghazi, Yousuf Jr., Muhammad Umer, Abid Hussain Ghazi, Qadir Bakhsh. Due to a strong squad made up of former Pakistani internationals, the club finished runners-up in the First Division.

=== EPIDC ===
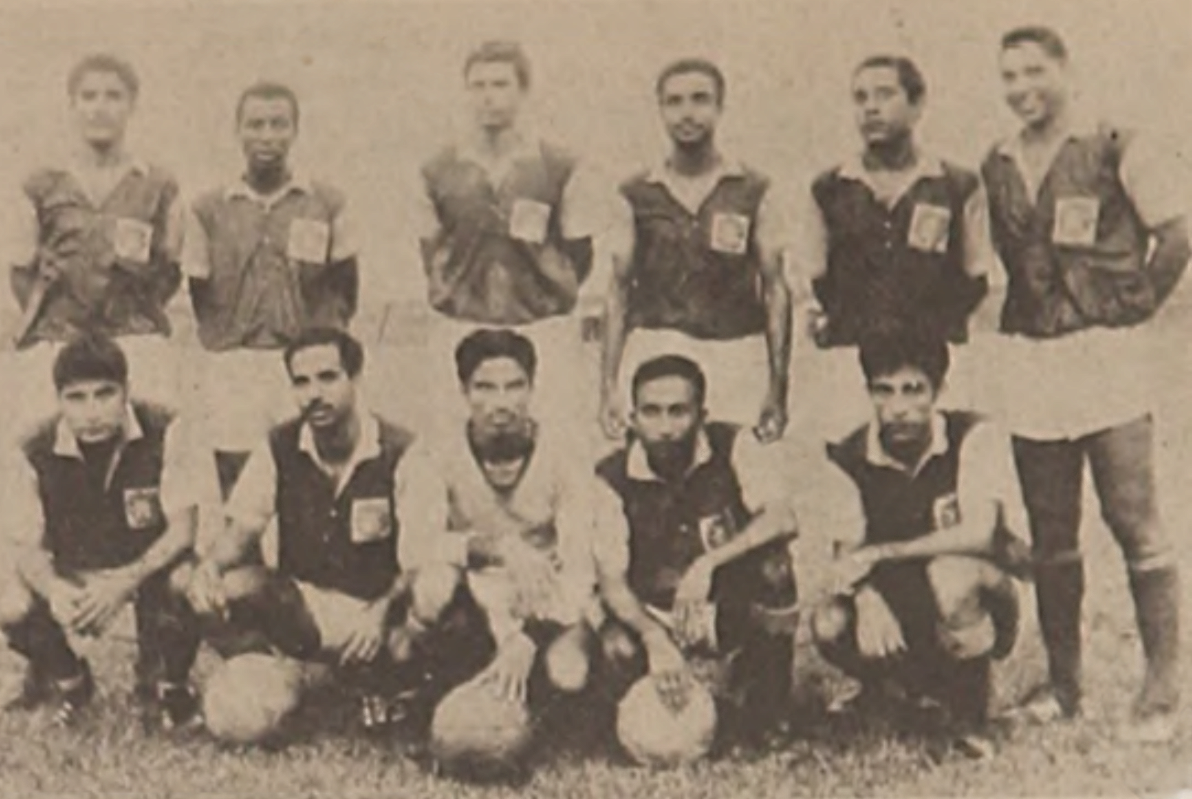
Ghafoor (second from extreme left, standing row) with EPIDC in 1970.

Ghafoor transferred to EPIDC in 1970. In his lone spell at the club, he helped the club win the First Division.

=== Karachi Port Trust ===
Following the independence of Bangladesh in 1971, Ghafoor joined Karachi Port Trust as a player and then became coach of the club before retiring from the team via golden handshake in 2000.

=== Return to Dhaka Mohammedan ===
In 1977, Ghafoor was among several Pakistani footballers recruited by Bangladeshi club Dhaka Mohammedan, alongside Ashiq Ali, Afzal Hussain and Fazlur Rahman. Ghafoor was the only one to remain for the entire season. Fellow Pakistani international Amir Bakhsh subsequently arrived at Mohammedan in 1979, but illness prevented him from making an appearance.

== International career ==
In 1959, Ghafoor received a call-up from coach John McBride, for a friendly tour in Burma and Indo-China. He subsequently played in December the same year at the 1960 AFC Asian Cup qualification held in India. Ghafoor along with fellow national teammate Qayyum Changezi were also the only Pakistani players selected to be part of the preliminary West Asian Region All-Stars team after the tournament.

Ghafoor was also part of the Pakistan team under the captainship of Muhammad Umer that played the 1962 Merdeka Tournament, where Pakistan reached the final but lost narrowly to Indonesia by 1–2.

In 1964, Abdul Ghafoor toured China with the national team and then was made vice-captain for a friendly tour in Ceylon in 1965 and the 1965 RCD Cup in Iran.

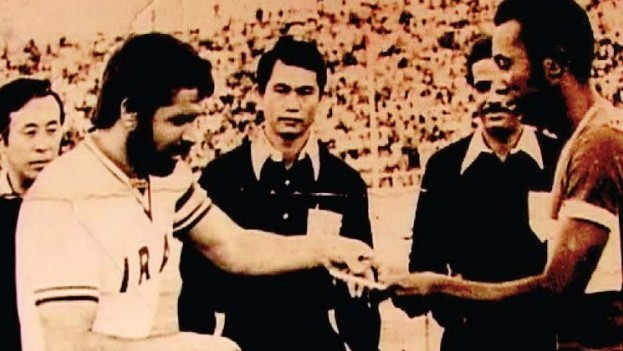
Abdul Ghafoor with Iran national team captain Parviz Ghelichkhani (left) during the 1974 Asian Games

In April 1967, Abdul Ghafoor announced his retirement from the national team after he and numerous footballers from Karachi had a falling out with then Pakistan Football Federation general secretary, Major Malik Muhammad Hussain. However, in 1974, Ghafoor came out of retirement on the special request of then Pakistan Football Federation president Abdul Sattar Gabol, to play for Pakistan once more at the 1974 Asian Games.

Ghafoor was part of Pakistan national football team in their golden era, when the national side recorded their best results against strong opponent sides.

== Personal life and legacy ==
"There was not a single player close to his quality in the subcontinent. He was such a quality player that we felt comfortable with the knowledge that he was playing for our side. Had he played in Europe, he would've been as famous as Pelé."

— Zakaria Pintoo during an interview to The Daily Star

Ghafoor was nicknamed the Pakistani Pelé during his playing days for his resemblance to the Brazilian football legend and his playing abilities. According to Ghafoor's son, when Pelé in Brazil heard about his look-alike in Pakistan, he expressed his desire to meet Ghafoor although that didn't happen. During his time in Dhaka, Ghafoor reportedly received offers to play for clubs in the Soviet Union and China.

When playing for Mohammedan Sporting Club in Dhaka, Ghafoor met his wife Sabiha. His wife's parents were originally from Allahabad in India, and the couple married after her father, who was a government servant, served as driver for a minister in Dhaka and was impressed by Ghafoor during football matches. The couple then later lived in Lyari, Karachi.

Ghafoor worked for Karachi Port Trust in his later years until his retirement. He natively spoke the Balochi language along with Urdu. After his retirement he was involved with the sport, visiting football grounds and spending his time at his former team Saifi Club, coaching younger players.

In May 2006, it was reported that Ghafoor had loss of hearing and nearly impaired vision. During his interview with Dawn before the 2006 FIFA World Cup, Ghafoor expressed his support for Brazil, and demanded the freedom of his jailed son Abdul Ghani, also a footballer and employee of Habib Bank who was arrested in early 2004 from his home in Karachi in a crackdown against extremists, after he was accused of planning terrorist acts. This also resulted in Ghafoor getting paralyzed due to the shock after local security authorities raided the house and detained his son. Ghani was later released from prison.

In 2006, the Bangladesh Football Federation also contacted Ghafoor again to suggest some players from Pakistan to play in their league. However, the letter never reached Ghafoor, and was sent to the Pakistan Football Federation as the Bangladesh football authorities believed that a player such as Ghafoor would be running the affairs of football in the country. The Pakistan Football Federation sent its own team of boys to Bangladesh instead of forwarding the letter to Ghafoor.

Ghafoor's sons also played football. His son Abdul Ghani played for Habib Bank, and his other son Abdul Waheed played for Pakistan Army FC. His nephews Allah Bakhsh played for PIA and Muhammad Shafi played for Habib Bank, while his brother-in-law Ishtiaq Ahmed played as a goalkeeper for Habib Bank.

== Death ==
Ghafoor died in Lyari, Karachi on 7 September 2012 after suffering from a paralysis attack four years prior. He was survived by his wife, his two sons and three daughters. He spent his last years in abject poverty. Although Faisal Saleh Hayat, the President of the Pakistan Football Federation released a statement after Ghafoor's death, the federation came under criticism from the Pakistani media over its lack of support for Ghafoor in his five years of illness.

== Career statistics ==
=== International goals ===
Scores and results list Pakistan's goal tally first, score column indicates score after each Ghafoor goal.

List of international goals scored by Abdul Ghafoor
No.	Date	Venue	Opponent	Score	Result	Competition	Ref.
1	17 December 1959	Maharaja's College Stadium, Ernakulam, India	Israel	2–0	2–2	1960 AFC Asian Cup qualification	
2	3 October 1964	Workers' Stadium, Beijing, China	China	2–0	2–0	Friendly	
3	25 March 1967	Niaz Stadium, Hyderabad, Pakistan	Saudi Arabia	2–0	2–2	Friendly	

== Honours ==
=== Pakistan ===
- Merdeka Tournament:
  - runners-up (1): 1962

=== Karachi Kickers ===
- Aga Khan Gold Cup (1): 1958

=== Mohammedan SC (Calcutta) ===
- Aga Khan Gold Cup (1): 1960
- Calcutta Football League
  - runners-up: 1960

=== Mohammedan SC (Dhaka) ===
- Aga Khan Gold Cup:
  - Winners (1): 1968
  - runners-up (1): 1961
- Dhaka First Division League
  - Winners (1): 1961
- Independence Day Football Tournament (1): 1961

=== Victoria SC ===
- Aga Khan Gold Cup:
  - Winners (1): 1962
- Dhaka First Division League
  - Winners (2): 1962, 1964
- Independence Day Football Tournament:
  - Winners (2): 1962, 1964

=== Dhaka Wanderers ===
- Dhaka First Division League runners-up (1): 1963
- Independence Day Tournament (1): 1963
- Aga Khan Gold Cup runners-up (1): 1963

=== EPIDC ===
- Dhaka First Division League: 1970

=== Individual ===
- AFC Asian All Stars: 1959

== See also ==
- List of Pakistan national football team captains
