= Victoria Sporting Club =

Bangladeshi association football club

Victoria SC
- Full name: Victoria Sporting Club, Dhaka
- Founded: 1903; 123 years ago
- Ground: BSSS Mostafa Kamal Stadium
- Capacity: 25,000
- President: Nesar Uddin Ahmed
- Manager: Md Murad Ahmed Milon
- League: Dhaka Second Division League
- 2026–27: TBD
Home colours	Away colours

Victoria Sporting Club (Bengali: ভিক্টোরিয়া স্পোর্টিং ক্লাব), commonly known as Victoria SC, is a football club based in Dhaka, Bangladesh. Founded in 1903, the club competes in the Dhaka Second Division League, the fourth tier of football in Bangladesh. They were relegated from the Bangladesh Championship League and Dhaka Senior Division League in 2021 and 2022, respectively.

== History ==
=== Foundation (1903–1933) ===
Victoria Sporting Club was established in 1903 and named after Queen Victoria during the British Raj. The club was founded by five zamindars from the Province of Bengal before its partition. The founding members were Babu Suresh Chandra Dham, Babu Nripen Roy Chowdhury, Ray Bahadur Keshav Chandra Banerjee, Dinesh Chandra Banerjee, and Babu Sunil Kumar Bosh. Initially, the club tent was located at the Paltan Maidan in Dhaka, now replaced by the Bhasani Hockey Stadium. The divisional commissioners were elected as uncontested presidents, while Babu Suresh Chandra, one of the founders, served as the first general secretary.

The club initially focused solely on football before expanding to include hockey and cricket teams in the 1930s. This expansion was overseen by Shahadat Ali Bhuiyan and Babu Nani Gopal Basak. The club was one of the constitutive members of the Dhaka Sporting Association (DSA), established near its club tent at the Paltan Maidan in 1895. The "Football Magician", Syed Abdus Samad, also played for the club in 1927.

=== Early years (1934–1959) ===
Before the Partition of India, Victoria regularly participated in the IFA Shield. (Note: Fourth oldest football tournament, organized by the IFA (W.B.), and played between the local clubs of West Bengal and other invited ones.) In 1944, Victoria was among eleven clubs from present-day Bangladesh that participated in the tournament. The club also played in inter-province competitions, notably in a tournament organized by the IFA in 1943 in Dhaka, and in 1945 alongside Bombay Province in a tournament held at the Cooperage Ground in Bombay (present-day Mumbai). In domestic football, Victoria participated in the Dhaka First Division Football League, held annually at the Paltan Maidan in Dhaka, and were main title contenders alongside Wari Club and Dhaka Farm.

Some of the club's notable players at the time included Sheikh Shaheb Ali, Babu Kshitish Chandra Roy, Gaur Basak, Noor Hossain, Dhirendra Chandra Bhawal, Arun Kumar Das and Abul Hasheem, to name a few. However, following the separation of India and Pakistan in 1947, saw the club lose majority of its Hindu players, who had migrated to clubs in West Bengal. Following the separation, Victoria would operate its club activities as part of a Muslim-majority East Bengal province of Pakistan. Nonetheless, the club made history a year later, in 1948, by becoming the first official champions of the province's prestigious Dhaka First Division Football League.

In 1949, the general secretary and one of the founding members, Babu Suresh Chandra Dham, departed for India. Meanwhile, the president of the club, the then Division Commissioner, S. Rahmat Ullah, was succeeded by the city's Superintendent of Police, Ali Irteja. It was during this time that the club began selecting officials through elections and initiated their own patron membership. Since 1951, Ali Reza Shaheb oversaw the club's development. From 1953, Victoria financially supported players from other clubs, leading to their own financial struggles and mid-table standings throughout the decade.

=== Golden era (1960–1964) ===
Following the establishment of East Pakistan, the club relocated its clubhouse twice. Initially near the Bhasani Hockey Stadium in 1960, then to a location near the Baitul Mukarram Mosque in Dhaka. However, the latter clubhouse was later burnt down by the Muslim residency, prompting the club to move to present-day Uttara. On the pitch, Victoria showed signs of improvement compared to the previous decade.

Muhammad Umer (left), receiving the 1962 Aga Khan Gold Cup trophy from Tunku Abdul Rahman.

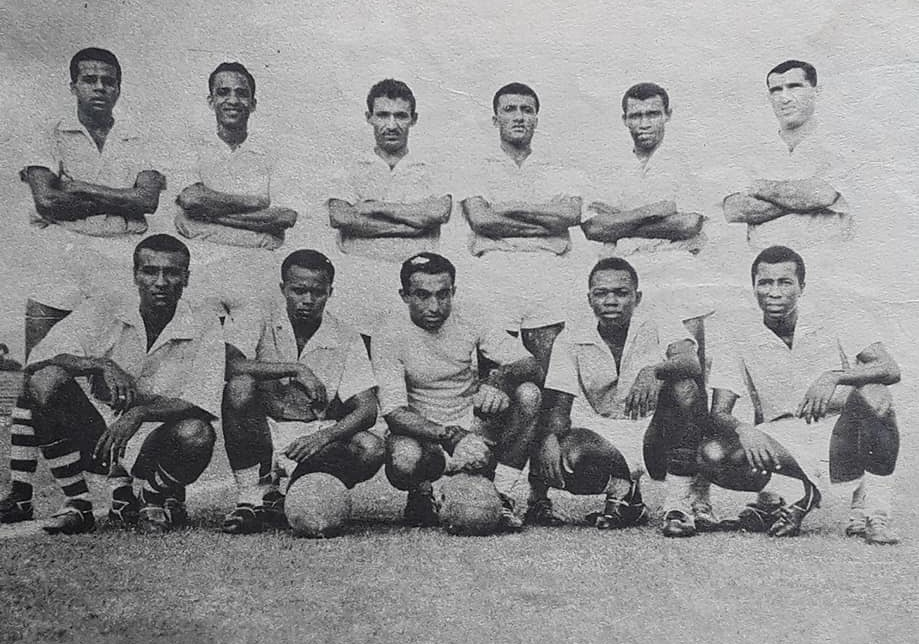
The line-up of Victoria before a league match in 1962.

In 1961, Victoria signed several West Pakistani talent and internationals, forming a solid squad, with the likes of Moosa Ghazi, Muhammad Umer, Hussain Killer, who were fresh off their stints in India, among many more, the club would finish runner-ups behind Mohammedan Sporting, in the league, and share the Independence Day Football Tournament with them as well.

The following season, with the additions of forwards, Ghulam Abbas and Abdullah Rahi, Yousuf Jr., Yousuf Sr. from Mohammedan, along with Abdul Ghafoor and Murad Bakhsh in midfield and defense respectively, and under the leadership of coach-cum-captain, Muhammad Umer, the club was undefeated champions of the First Division League, while also winning the Independence Day Tournament. Victoria also won the prestigious 1962 Aga Khan Gold Cup title, dismantling the feeder team for South Korea, Young Taegeuk Football Association 5–1. In the league, Victoria defeated defending champions, Mohammedan 5–0 and 5–2 over two phases, while captain Umer, also recorded 10 goals in a single league game against Wari Club.

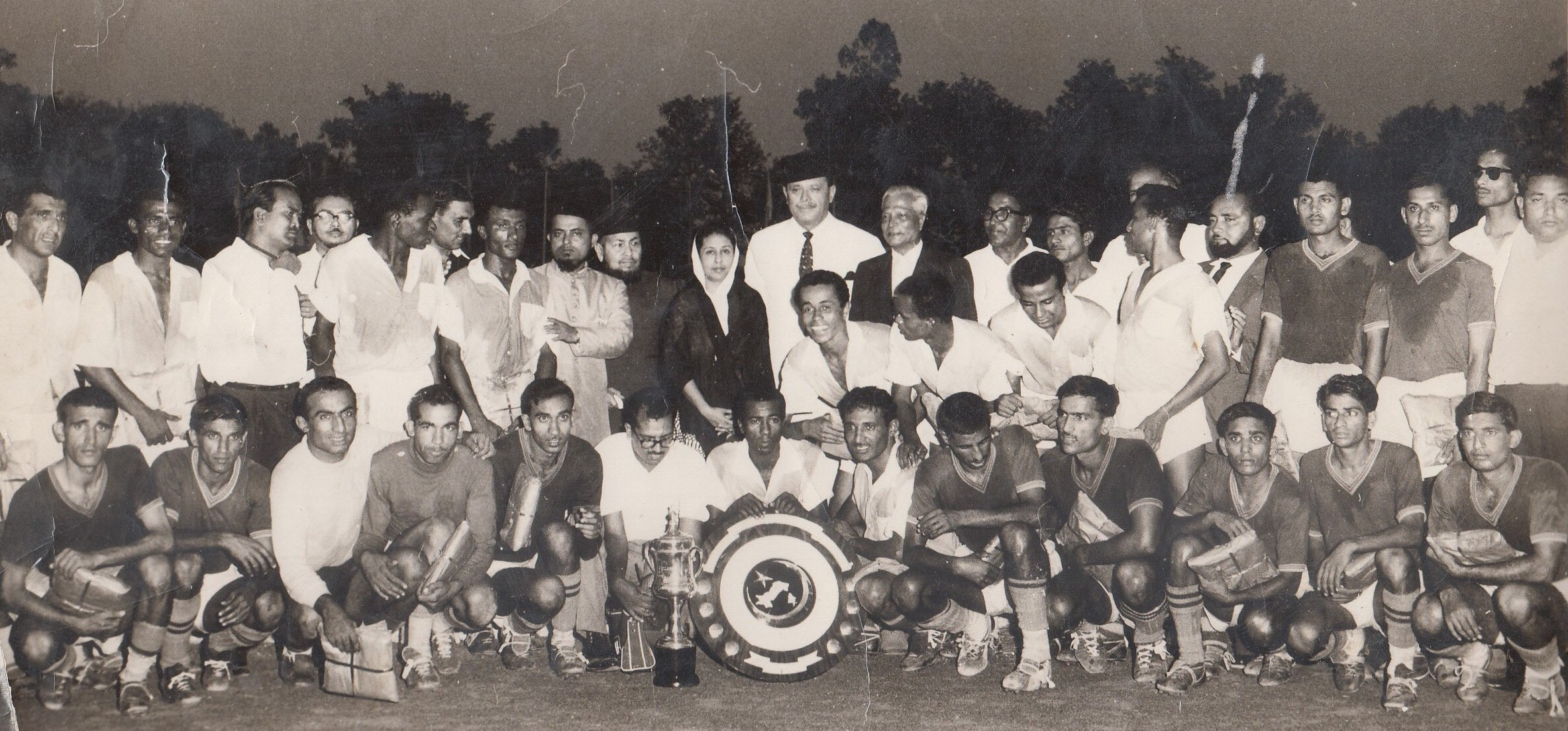
Victoria SC and Pakistan Air Force during the 1963 All-Pakistan Mohammad Ali Bogra Memorial Tournament final pictured with Ayub Khan

However, after issues with the EP Sports Federation, Victoria withdrew from the league with few games remaining in 1963. Nevertheless, they managed to win the inaugural All-Pakistan Mohammad Ali Bogra Memorial Tournament, defeating the Pakistan Air Force in the final held in Rawalpindi. The following year, Victoria regained the league title alongside the Independence Day Tournament. They also won again the All-Pakistan Mohammad Ali Bogra Memorial Tournament after defeating Pakistan Railways in the final. From 1962 to 1965, the club enjoyed an unbeaten run that lasted for 67 games. Nonetheless, the club, consisting primarily of Makrani players from the Pakistan national team, was often criticized for not prioritizing Bengali players and was often branded as the "Makrani XI" by Bengali newspapers.

=== Downfall and relegation (1965–1993) ===
In 1965, football in Dhaka took a long break due to the Indo-Pakistani war, killing the momentum the club had found at the start of the decade. Following the resumption of the First Division that year, the club's unbeaten streak, which had lasted for over three years, came to an end when they suffered a 3–2 defeat to PWD Sports Club in the sixth round. In 1969, the club withdrew from the First Division after being forced out of their club tent, a move that was expected to result in relegation. However, they were later granted a pardon and allowed to rejoin the league the following season.

Following the Independence of Bangladesh, Victoria's Makrani players returned to West Pakistan, which saw the club lose its pre-independence strength. In 1973, the club finished in tenth place in the first league season held following independence, trailing behind the likes of PWD and WAPDA Sports Club.

From 1975 to 1980, Victoria were led by coach Abdur Rahim, under whom the club focused on youth football, producing future national players such as, Sheikh Mohammad Aslam and Khurshid Alam Babul. Although the club failed to achieve the same level of success as they did before Bangladesh's independence, Victoria managed to win local tournaments such as the Rakib Uddin Gold Cup Tournament held in Cumilla in 1978 and the Abdul Motaleb Gold Cup Tournament held in Noakhali in 1982. The club also moved to a permanent tent in 1988, located in the heart of the city, Motijheel.

Nonetheless, the decade saw the club threatened with relegation, finishing in the relegation zone and eventually managing to survive in 1984, 1985, 1986, 1987, and 1988/89. The club, one of the founding members and the first-ever champions of the First Division, were eventually relegated in the first edition of the Dhaka Premier Division Football League in 1993 after finishing bottom of the table, marking an end to its 45-year stay in the top division.

=== Yo-yo years and professionalization (1994–2018) ===
In 1994, the club entered the Dhaka First Division Football League, which had become the second-tier below the Premier Division the previous year. In 1996, under coach Abu Yusuf, the club earned promotion back to the Premier Division as champions. However, they were relegated again in their first season back in the top-flight. In 1999, Yusuf guided the club back to the Premier Division, this time with the help of striker Azizur Rahman Sohag, who scored 16 goals on their way to the title. They suffered a similar fate in their first season back and were relegated, but were again promoted as 2001 First Division champions.

They faced their final relegation from the top-flight in the 2003/04 season. Although Victoria, guided by star striker Mithun Chowdhury, had secured promotion back to the top-tier after finishing third in the 2004/05 First Division League, the Senior Division was not held for the following two seasons, and the club was also not granted entry to the inaugural season of the country's first professional league, the Bangladesh Premier League.

In 2008, the club began participating in the Dhaka Senior Division Football League, a merger of the Premier and First Division, serving as the second-tier. In 2010, Victoria finished runners-up and were bound to participate in the 2010–11 professional league, however, their entry was denied by the BFF. In 2012, Victoria were one of the seven founding members of the second-tier professional football league, the Bangladesh Championship League. Despite mid-table finishes in the first five editions, they came third in the 2017 edition, narrowly missing promotion by six points.

=== Casino scandal and consecutive relegations (2019–present) ===
In September 2019, the Bangladesh Police raided four sporting organizations in Motijheel, among which Victoria was the leading name found to have an illegal casino inside the club premises, with nine betting tables and Tk1 lakh being recovered from the club. It was also reported that the club premises were regularly filled by influential leaders of the ruling Awami League's associate wings such as Jubo League and Swechchhasebak League throughout the political party's rule.

Gambling through card games has been there since the Pakistan regime. We have seen many wives come to club tents looking for their husbands who did not return home at night.

— Statement made by an anonymous club official to The Daily Star.

With the club premises being closed down after the police raid and the additional financial strain due to COVID-19 the following year, the club resumed its operations in 2021 and managed to organize a team for the 2020–21 Bangladesh Championship League. Nonetheless, they were relegated to semi-professional football that season, finishing bottom of the table with 4 draws and 18 defeats from 22 games. The club also conceded a total of 65 goals while scoring only 8 times.

They entered the third tier from the 2021–22 Dhaka Senior Division League season and marked their return to Dhaka football after almost a decade by defeating Dilkusha SC 4–1. However, by the end of the season, the club would taste only one more victory, and for the first time in its history, it was relegated to the Dhaka Second Division Football League, now serving as the fourth-tier football league in Bangladesh and the country's second-highest division of semi-professional football.

On 4 September 2023, after almost four years of being closed, the club's tent was finally reopened under new guidelines. Nonetheless, it was also reported that the premise suffered heavily from the closure and would require renovations worth Tk 1 crore. According to long-term club president Showkat Ali Khan Jahangir, all of the club's achievements, including their 1962 Aga Khan Gold Cup trophy, were stolen while the club tent was shut down.

== Competitive record ==
Record as Professional Football League member
Season	Division	League								Federation Cup	Independence Cup	Top league scorer(s)	
Season	Division	P	W	D	L	GF	GA	Pts	Position	Federation Cup	Independence Cup	Player	Goals
2012	BCL	12	3	4	5	10	13	13	6th	DNP	DNP	(Bangladesh) Toklis Ahmed	3
2013	BCL	14	3	6	5	11	22	15	7th	DNP	DNP	(Bangladesh) Md Abu Hanif	3
2014	BCL	18	5	3	10	19	28	18	6th	DNP	DNP	(Bangladesh) Faisal Ahmed Shitol	7
2014–15	BCL	14	3	6	5	12	15	15	6th	DNP	DNP	(Bangladesh) Rashedul Islam Shuvo	6
2015–16	BCL	14	3	5	6	14	16	14	6th	DNP	DNP	(Bangladesh) Arifur Rahman	6
2017	BCL	18	6	4	8	24	16	10	3rd	DNP	DNP		
2018–19	BCL	20	6	8	6	20	19	26	5th	DNP	DNP		
2019–20	BCL	Cancelled								DNP	DNP	—	—
2020–21	BCL	22	0	4	18	8	65	4	12th	DNP	DNP	(Bangladesh) Santo Tudu	3

Champions	Runners-up	Promoted	Relegated

== Team records ==
=== Coaching records ===
As of 5 July 2026

Head Coach	From	To	P	W	D	L	GS	GA	%W
(Bangladesh) Md Murad Ahmed Milon	1 March 2026	Present	1	1	0	0	2	1	100.00

== Honours ==
=== Domestic ===
- Dhaka First Division League (level 1)
  - Winner (3): 1948, 1962, 1964
  - Runners-up (3): 1960, 1961, 1965
- Dhaka First Division League (level 2)
  - Winner (3): 1996, 1999, 2001
- Aga Khan Gold Cup (Note: The competition is widely regarded as the predecessor of AFC Champions League (held for the first time in 1967), since it was the first organized international competition that involved club teams around Asia, organized by the football authorities of East Pakistan, in collaboration with Asian Football Confederation (AFC).)
  - Winner (1): 1962
- Nar Narayan Shield
  - Winners (1): 1948
- Independence Day Football Tournament
  - Winners (3): 1961, 1962, 1964
  - Runners-up (1): 1965
- All-Pakistan Mohammad Ali Bogra Memorial Tournament
  - Winners (2): 1963, 1964

=== Invitational ===
- Sikkim Governor's Gold Cup
  - Runners-up (1): 1993

== Notable players ==
- (British Raj) Syed Abdus Samad (1927)
- (Pakistan) Sheikh Shaheb Ali (1939–1944)
- (Pakistan) Mari Chowdhury (1958)
- (Pakistan) Abid Hussain Ghazi (1958)
- (Pakistan) Muhammad Umer (1961–1965)
- (Pakistan) Hussain Killer (1961–1965)
- (Pakistan) Lal Muhammad Khamisa (1960s)
- (Pakistan) Abdullah Rahi (1962–1963)
- (Pakistan) Abdul Ghafoor Majna (1962–1964)
- (Pakistan) Ghulam Rabbani (1962)
- (Pakistan) Abdul Gafur Baloch (1962)
- (Pakistan) Murad Bakhsh (1962–1965)
- (Pakistan) Yousuf Sr. (1962–1964)
- (Pakistan) Ghulam Abbas Baloch (1962–1965)
- (Pakistan) Moosa Ghazi (1961)
- (Pakistan) Qadir Bakhsh (1962)
- (Pakistan) Abdul Jabbar (1965)
- (Pakistan) Kazi Mahmud Hasan (1966)
- (Pakistan) Kabir Ahmed (1967)
- (Pakistan) Debinash Sangma (1967)
- (Pakistan) Golam Sarwar Tipu (1967)
- (Pakistan) Younus Changezi (1967–1968)
- (India) Shabbir Ali (1984–1985)
- (Nepal) Raju Kaji Shakya (1986–1988)

== Notable matches ==
Competition	Round	Year	Opposition	Score	Venue	City	GF	GA
Aga Khan Gold Cup	Final	1962	(South Korea) Young Taegeuk FA	5–1	Dhaka Stadium	Dhaka	Umer 3', 43'; Ghafoor 4'; Abdullah 34'; Abbas 67'	Lee Yi-woo 24'
Victoria SC XI	Ghulam Hussain, Khuda Bakhsh, Baloch, Murad, Hussain Killer, Ghafoor, Rabbani, Abdullah, Umer, Abbas, Yousuf Sr. (Yousuf Jr.)							
Young Taegeuk FA XI	Yang Woo-Sik, Lim Young-kook, Um Kyoung-jim, Lee Woo-bong, Kim Jung-nam, Um Kyung-Bai (Kim Young-bai), Cho Ke-taik, Kuk-chan Lim, Lee Yi-woo, You Chun Suk, Chung-kang Moon							
Match played on 20 October 1962

== Other departments ==
=== Field hockey ===
Victoria Sporting Club has a field hockey team which participates in the Dhaka Premier Division Hockey League and Club Cup Hockey Tournament. They clinched the Atiqullah Cup in 1958. Legendary hockey player Bashir Ahmed, one of only three East Pakistani players to represent the Pakistan national field hockey team, played both football and hockey for the club from 1957 to 1962.

=== Cricket ===
The club's cricket team currently participates in the Dhaka First Division Cricket League after suffering relegation from the Dhaka Premier Division Cricket League during the 2016–17 season. They were also champions of the National Premier League in 2002 and 2003.

== See also ==
- List of football clubs in Bangladesh
- History of football in Bangladesh
