= Murad Bakhsh (footballer) =

Pakistani footballer (1943 – 2019)

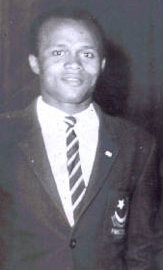
- Bakhsh in the 1960s

Personal information
- Full name: Murad Bakhsh Makwa
- Date of birth: 1943
- Place of birth: Lyari, Karachi, British India
- Date of death: 2019 (aged 76)
- Place of death: Karachi, Pakistan
- Position: Defender

Senior career*
Years	Team	Apps	(Gls)
1960–1963	Dhaka Wanderers		
1962–1965	Victoria SC		
1966–1970	Pakistan Airlines		

International career
1963–1969	Pakistan		
- * Club domestic league appearances and goals

Murad Bakhsh Makwa (1943 – 2019) was a Pakistani footballer who played as a defender. Bakhsh played for various clubs during his playing days. He also represented the Pakistan national team during the 1960s.

== Club career ==
=== Early career ===
Bakhsh initially played for clubs in Karachi, and was also selected by the Karachi football team at the National Football Championship in late 1950s and early 1960s.

=== Dhaka Wanderers ===
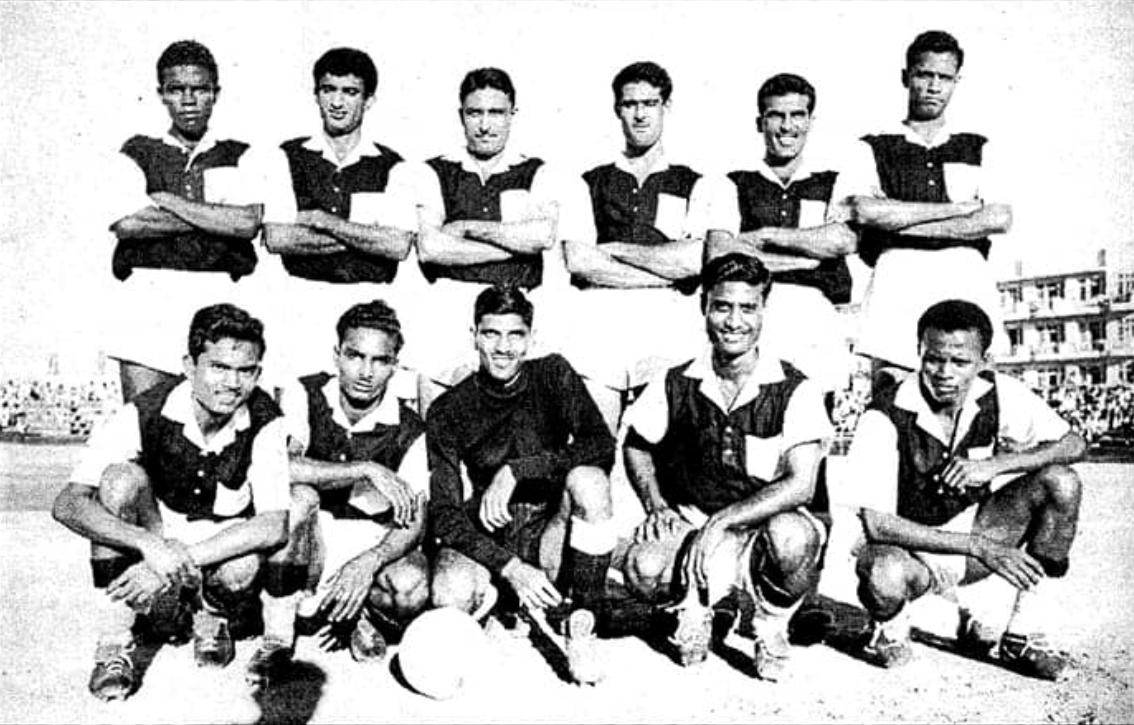
Bakhsh sitting at the far right with Dhaka Wanderers Club at the Pakistan President's Gold Cup in Karachi in 1961.

In 1960, following his performances, Dhaka Wanderers brought Bakhsh in, winning their seventh First Division League title. During his stay in the Dhaka League, he also represented the Dacca Division at the National Football Championship. In 1963, the club finished as runner-up of the Aga Khan Gold Cup after defeating Police AC, Nepal XI, Pakistan Western Railway and Indonesia XI in the semi-final. In the final, held on 29 October 1963, Wanderers lost 1–2 to Pakistan Railways, with Bakhsh included in the starting eleven of the game.

=== Victoria SC ===
In 1962, Bakhsh represented the Victoria Sporting Club, at the 1962 Aga Khan Gold Cup held in Dacca, playing a key role throughout the tournament, also being included in the final. Bakhsh also captained and played for the side throughout the 1960s.

=== Pakistan Airlines ===
In 1966, Murad then transferred to Pakistan Airlines, playing and captaining them on several occasions.

== International career ==
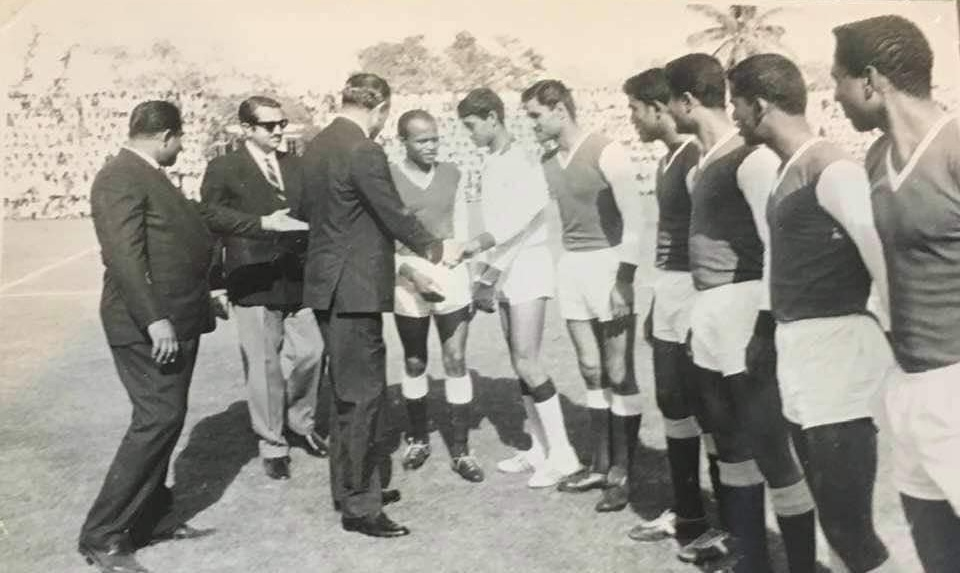
Bakhsh presenting the team to chief guests before a match against CSKA Moscow at the KMC Stadium on 28 February 1969

In 1963, Bakhsh represented the Pakistan national football team against Iran at the 1964 Summer Olympics qualification. The following year, he toured China with the national team.

In 1965, he toured Ceylon with the national team, and also later played the 1965 RCD Cup. Where he was praised for his defensive abilities as left fullback, preventing several goals in the eventual 1–3 defeat against Turkey. In 1967, Bakhsh was selected to play for Pakistan, for their participation at the 1967 RCD Cup. He also featured in the 1968 AFC Asian Cup qualification in Burma.

In 1969, Bakhsh was appointed as the captain when the national side toured the Soviet Union for unofficial test matches against club sides, and led the team during the 1969 Friendship Cup held in Tehran, Iran, marking his last appearances with the team.

== Coaching career ==
After retiring as player, Bakhsh served as assistant coach of the Pakistan Airlines football team. He served as head coach of the Pakistan Blues team at the 1982 Quaid-e-Azam International Tournament.

== Death ==
In his last years, Bakhsh spent his life in Karachi, and featured as special guest in several local tournaments. He died in 2019 in Karachi, at the age of 76.

== Honours ==
Dhaka Wanderers

- Dhaka First Division League:
  - Winners (1): 1960

Victoria SC

- Aga Khan Gold Cup:
  - Winners (1): 1962

== See also ==
- List of Pakistan national football team captains
