= Abdullah Rahi =

Pakistani footballer (1939–2026)

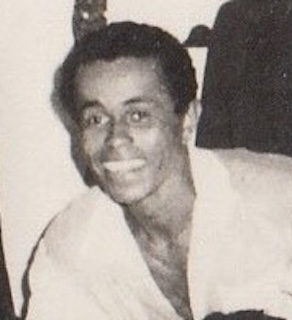
- Rahi with Victoria SC in 1963

Personal information
- Date of birth: 1939
- Place of birth: Karachi, British India
- Date of death: 23 April 2026 (aged 86–87)
- Place of death: Multan, Pakistan
- Position: Inside forward

Senior career*
Years	Team	Apps	(Gls)
- Baghdad Sports
- Sindh Government Press
- Keamari Muhammadan
1960–1961	Mohammedan Sporting		
1962–1963	Victoria	34	(22)
1964–1970	Mohammedan Sporting		
1971–?	Karachi Port Trust		

International career
1959–1967	Pakistan		
- * Club domestic league appearances and goals

Abdullah Rahi (Urdu: عبداللہ راہی; 1939 – 23 April 2026) was a Pakistani footballer who played as an inside forward. He represented the Pakistan national team in the 1960s, and was member of the national squad which finished finalists at the 1962 Merdeka Tournament.

== Early life ==
Abdullah was born in the Lyari locality of Karachi. He belonged to the Makrani Baloch community (also known as Sheedi) of African descent.

== Club career ==
=== Early career ===
Abdullah started his playing career in 1954 for several Karachi based clubs such as Baghdad Sports, Sindh Government Press, and Keamari Muhammadan in the regional Karachi First Division Football League. In 1958, he embarked in a tour to Saudi Arabia with Karachi Kickers. He represented Karachi at the National Football Championship.

=== Dhaka Mohammedan ===
Abdullah later represented several clubs in East Pakistan at the Dhaka First Division League starting in 1960 when he moved to Dhaka Mohammedan. He also represented East Pakistan and Dacca Division selections in the National Football Championship.

=== Victoria ===
Abdullah represented Victoria in 1962–1963. Helping the team win the 1962 league, and he also scored a goal against Young Taegeuk FA in the 1962 Aga Khan Gold Cup final winning by five goals to one.

The next year, he represented Dhaka Wanderers as a guest player and helped the side finish runner-up at the 1963 Aga Khan Gold Cup.

=== Return to Dhaka Mohammedan ===
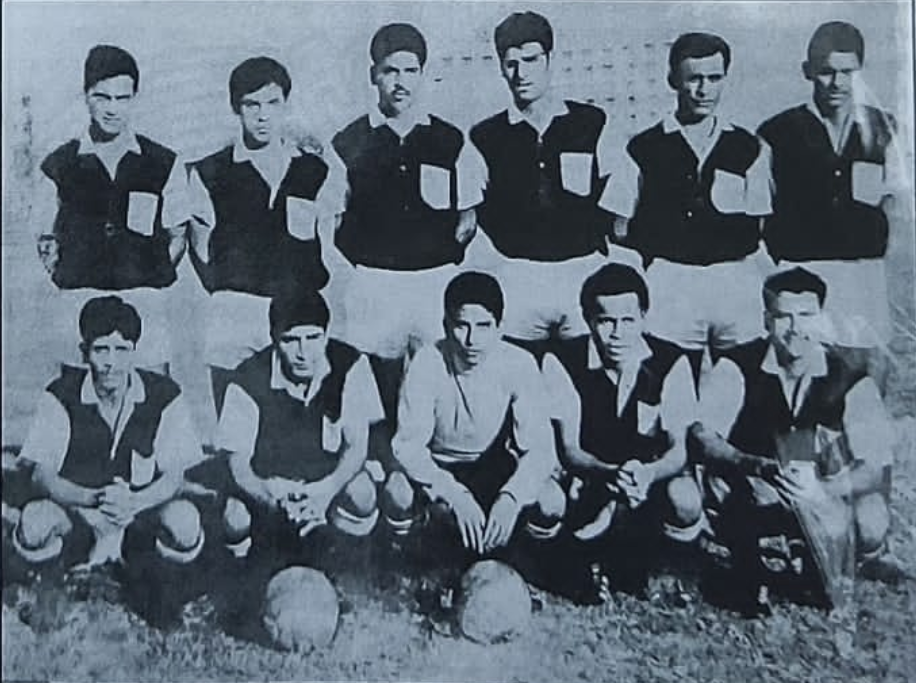
Abdullah second sitting from right to left with the 1969 unbeaten league champions Dhaka Mohammedan

Upon his return to Dhaka Mohammedan, he captained the side in 1967. And in 1969, Abdullah helped Dhaka Mohammedan win the league title as unbeaten champions. His attacking partnership with Golam Sarwar Tipu, Pratap Shankar Hazra, and fellow Pakistan national team forward Ali Nawaz Baloch being integral to their success that season.

=== Karachi Port Trust ===
After Bangladesh gained independence in 1971, Abdullah played with Karachi Port Trust.

== International career ==
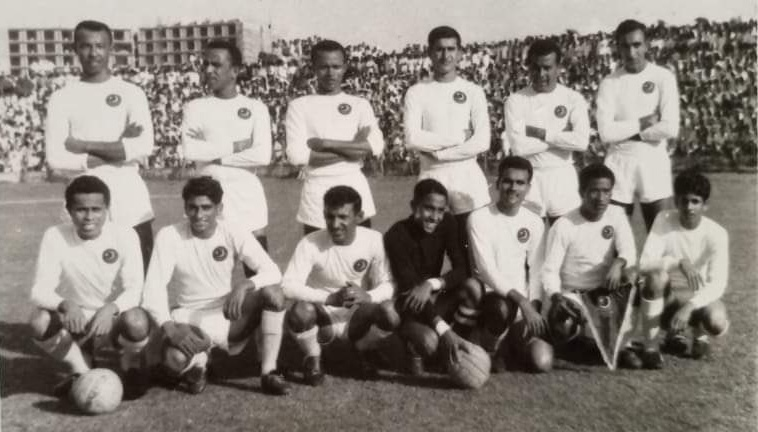
Abdullah sitting far left with the Pakistan national team in 1964

In 1959, Abdullah was first selected of the Pakistan national team for a tour to Burma. The same year he participated at the 1960 AFC Asian Cup qualification in Ernakulam, India. Abdullah recorded the winning goal at the 53rd minute in Pakistan's first official victory over India, during the 1960 AFC Asian Cup qualification. The following year, Abdullah featured at the 1960 Merdeka Tournament. The next year he played against Burma in a home test series.

In 1962, Abdullah was member of the national squad which finished runners-up at the 1962 Merdeka Tournament after falling in the final against Indonesia by 1–2. The next year he played against China in a friendly, and also appeared against Iran at the 1964 Summer Olympics qualification. In 1964, he was part of the national squad which toured China, and in 1965 he toured Ceylon, and later Iran during the 1965 RCD Cup. In 1967, Abdullah played his last international matches in a test series against Saudi Arabia scoring a goal in a 2–4 loss.

== Personal life and death ==
During his time in East Pakistan, Abdullah was married to a woman of Bihari descent.

Abdullah died in Multan, Punjab on 23 April 2026. His body was transported to his native Lyari in Karachi for burial.

== Career statistics ==
Scores and results list Pakistan's goal tally first, score column indicates score after each Rahi goal.

List of international goals scored by Abdullah Rahi
No.	Date	Venue	Opponent	Score	Result	Competition	Ref.
1	24 April 1959	Aung San Stadium, Rangoon, Burma	Burma	2–1	3–2	Friendly	
2	13 December 1959	Maharaja College Stadium, Ernakulam, India	India	1–0	1–0	1960 AFC Asian Cup qualification	
3	21 March 1967	Sukkur Municipal Stadium, Sukkur, Pakistan	Saudi Arabia		2–4	Friendly	

== Honours ==
Victoria SC

- Dhaka First Division League:
  - Winners (1): 1962
- Aga Khan Gold Cup:
  - Winners (1): 1962
- Independence Day Tournament:
  - Winners (1): 1962

Dhaka Mohammedan

- Dhaka First Division Football League:
  - Winners (2): 1961, 1969
- Aga Khan Gold Cup:
  - Winners (1): 1961
- Independence Day Football Tournament:
  - Winners (2): 1960, 1961

Dhaka Wanderers

- Aga Khan Gold Cup:
  - Winners (1): 1963
- Independence Day Football Tournament:
  - Winners (1): 1963

Pakistan

- Merdeka Tournament
  - Runners-up (1): 1962
