= Pakistan International Airlines FC in international football =

Pakistan International Airlines FC in International Football
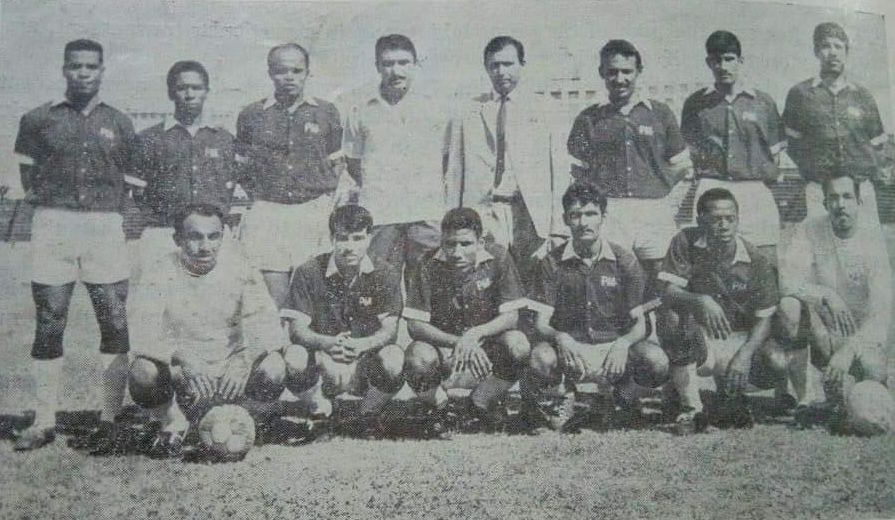
- PIA team which participated in 1970 Aga Khan Gold Cup
- Club: Pakistan International Airlines
- First entry: 1985–86
- Latest entry: 1990–91

Pakistan International Airlines FC, abbreviated as PIA FC, served as the football section of Pakistan International Airlines. Based in Karachi, Sindh, the club used to compete in the National Football Championship and Pakistan Premier League. The club is the most successful club in Pakistan at the National Football Championship with nine titles, with their first title in 1971 and their last title win in the 1998–99 season.

The team became the first Pakistani club to feature in an Asian club competition, when it played the 1985–86 Asian Club Championship, as winners of the 1984 Inter-Provincial Championship. It again featured at the 1990–91 Asian Club Championship based on their National Championship victories.

A separate Asian Cup Winners' Cup was introduced in 1990 intended for domestic cup champions. Pakistan Airlines were due to feature in the 1992–93 and 1998–99 editions, although the team withdrew in the qualifying matches.

== Major appearances ==
Competition	No. of appearances	Seasons	Best result
Asian Club Championship (Note: Was known as AFC Champions League from 2002 till 2024 and is now known as the AFC Champions League Elite since 2024.)	2	1985–86, 1990–91	Group stages (1985–86, 1990–91)

== Participation record ==
AFC Tournaments
Season	Competition	Result
1985–86	Central Asia Champions' Cup	Group stage
1990–91	Asian Club Championship	Group stage
1992–93	Asian Cup Winners' Cup	Withdrew
1998–99	Asian Cup Winners' Cup	Withdrew

Invitational Tournaments
Season	Country	Competition	Result
1960	Pakistan	1960 Aga Khan Gold Cup	N/A
1962	Pakistan	1962 Aga Khan Gold Cup	Semi Finals
1963	Pakistan	1963 Aga Khan Gold Cup	Group stage
1964	Pakistan	1964 Aga Khan Gold Cup	Qualifying stage
1968	Pakistan	1968 Aga Khan Gold Cup	Group stage
1970	Pakistan	1970 Aga Khan Gold Cup	Group stage
1977–78	Bangladesh	1977–78 Aga Khan Gold Cup	Group stage
1981–82	Bangladesh	1981–82 Aga Khan Gold Cup	Group stage
1982–83	India	1982–83 DCM Trophy	Group stage
1991	Nepal	1991 TAAN Cup	Third place

== Statistics ==
=== Overall Record in Continental Competitions ===
Includes records from qualifier and preliminary stage matches as well.

Competition	First match	Last match	Record							
Competition	First match	Last match	Pld	W	D	L	GF	GA	GD	Win %
Asian Club Championship	2 August 1985	17 July 1990	7	2	3	2	9	8	+1	28.57
Total			7	2	3	2	9	8	+1	28.57

Source: Competitions

== Asian Club Championship ==
The AFC Champions League is an annual continental club football competition organised by the Asian Football Confederation. Introduced in 1967 as the Asian Club Championship, the competition rebranded and took on its current name in 2002 as a result of the merger between the Asian Club Championship, the Asian Cup Winners' Cup and the Asian Super Cup. Pakistan Airlines took part in the competition twice (1985–86 and 1990–91), failing to go past the group stage/first round both times.

=== 1985–86 Asian Club Championship ===
==== 1985 Central Asia Champions' Cup ====
Pos	Team	Pld	W	D	L	GF	GA	GD	Pts	Qualification
1	(India) East Bengal	5	5	0	0	20	0	+20	10	Qualified for 1985–86 Asian Club Championship
2	(Bangladesh) Abahani Krira Chakra	5	4	0	1	17	4	+13	8	
3	(Sri Lanka) Saunders (H)	5	2	1	2	12	8	+4	5	
4	(Pakistan) PIA	5	1	2	2	8	8	0	4	
5	(Nepal) New Road Team	5	1	1	3	8	11	−3	3	
6	(Maldives) Club Valencia	5	0	0	5	2	36	−34	0	

Source: Champions' Cup 1985/86
(H) Hosts
- Afghanistan and Iran champions withdrew.

Pakistan Airlines became the first Pakistani club to feature in an Asian club competition, when it played the 1985–86 Asian Club Championship, as winners of the 1984 Inter-Provincial Championship. The format of the tournament was different with different zonal tournaments that were held and the winners of these zonal tournaments would progress into the main finals to be held in Jedah, Saudi Arabia. Pakistan Airlines was part of the Central Asia Zone, and the tournament was named Coca-Cola Cup. They were to face the champions of Sri Lanka, Bangladesh, Nepal, India, Afghanistan, Iran and Maldives however, the two teams from Iran and Afghanistan withdrew their names.

===== Matches =====
Win Draw Loss

2 August 1985 1	Pakistan Airlines	0–3	(Bangladesh) Abahani Krira Chakra	Colombo, Sri Lanka
			Aslam; Kamal; Chunnu (pen.)	Stadium: Sugathadasa Stadium

4 August 1985 2	Pakistan Airlines	6–1	(Maldives) Club Valencia	Colombo, Sri Lanka
				Stadium: Sugathadasa Stadium

7 August 1985 3	Pakistan Airlines	0–2	(India) East Bengal	Colombo, Sri Lanka
			Bhattacharya; Roy	Stadium: Sugathadasa Stadium

11 August 1985 4	Pakistan Airlines	2–2	(Sri Lanka) Saunders	Colombo, Sri Lanka
				Stadium: Sugathadasa Stadium

13 August 1985 5	Pakistan Airlines	0–0	(Nepal) New Road Team	Colombo, Sri Lanka
				Stadium: Sugathadasa Stadium

=== 1990–91 Asian Club Championship ===
==== Group stage ====
Pos	Team	Pld	W	D	L	GF	GA	GD	Pts	Qualification
1	(Oman) Al-Nasr	2	1	1	0	2	0	+2	3	Qualify to Quarter-finals
2	Pakistan Airlines (H)	2	1	1	0	1	0	+1	3	
3	(Nepal) Ranipokhari	2	0	0	2	0	3	−3	0	

Source: RSSSF
(H) Hosts

PIA qualified for the 1990–91 Asian Club Championship, after winning the National Football Championship. The team faced Al-Nasr SC from Oman and Ranipokhari Corner Team from Nepal at the Ayub National Stadium in Quetta. In 17 July, the team played to a goalless draw against the Omani side. Despite both teams finishing with three points, Oman advanced to the next round based on a superior goal difference. PIA, the tournament's sponsor, had a solid chance of qualifying for the second round but failed to capitalize on their opportunities despite controlling much of the match. In the 28th minute, Naushad Baloch made a threatening run, though it did not result in a goal. He was also cautioned with a yellow card for charging into the opposing goalkeeper. The best opportunity for PIA came when Baloch's header from a cross by Majeed sailed over the bar. Al-Nasr responded with a dangerous attack, and Salim Juman found the net, but the goal was ruled offside by Bahraini linesman Matal Al Mahlood. Just before halftime, Mukhtar Ali saved a certain goal with an acrobatic overhead kick after PIA goalkeeper Jamshed Rana had been beaten. In the second half, PIA dominated early on. Al-Nasr, focused more on securing a draw, made two substitutions, but were unable to score. Late in the game, PIA received two more yellow cards from Sri Lankan referee Mohsin Arif due to player disputes. In the final minutes, Salah Musyiah launched a powerful shot at the PIA goal, but Jamshed Rana was able to punch it over the bar.

==== Matches ====
Win Draw Loss

13 July 1990 First Round	Pakistan Airlines	1–0	(Nepal) Ranipokhari	Quetta, Pakistan
				Stadium: Ayub National Stadium

17 July 1990 First Round	Pakistan Airlines	0–0	(Oman) Al-Nasr	Quetta, Pakistan
				Stadium: Ayub National Stadium

== Asian Cup Winners' Cup ==
The Asian Cup Winners' Cup was a football competition run by the Asian Football Confederation. The competition was started in 1991 as a tournament for all the domestic cup winners from countries affiliated to the AFC. Pakistan Airlines were due to feature in the 1992–93 edition against York Sporting Club of Sri Lanka, and 1998–99 edition against Happy Valley, although the team withdrew in the qualifying matches.

== Other International Tournaments ==
The Aga Khan Gold Cup is widely regarded as the predecessor of AFC Champions League (held for the first time in 1967), since it was the first organised international competition that involved club teams around Asia, organised by the football authorities of East Pakistan (later Bangladesh), in collaboration with Asian Football Confederation (AFC).

=== 1962 Aga Khan Gold Cup ===
==== Matches ====
Win Draw Loss

15 October 1962 Qualifying stage	Pakistan Airlines	2–2	(Pakistan) Mohammedan SC	Dhaka, Pakistan
	Changez 19'; Majid 53'	Report	Moosa	Stadium: Dhaka Stadium; Referee: M.A. Hamza (Pakistan)

17 October 1962 Qualifying stage replay	Pakistan Airlines	Abandoned (Note: Mohammedan refused to play extra time without Moosa Ghazi, who had been sent off during regular time. A minute after extra time began, Moosa re-entered the field. When the referee, M.A. Hamza, asked him to leave, Mohammedan refused to continue the match. Later that day, the tournament committee awarded the match to Pakistan Airlines while the East Pakistan Sports Federation imposed a six-month suspension on Moosa.) (0–0) (a.e.t.)	(Pakistan) Mohammedan SC	Dhaka, Pakistan
		Report		Stadium: Dhaka Stadium; Referee: M.A. Hamza (Pakistan)

19 October 1962 Semifinals	Pakistan Airlines	1–4 (a.e.t.)	(South Korea) Young Taegeuk FA	Dhaka, Pakistan
	Saeed 17'	Report	Chun Kang-moon 4'; Kuk-chan Lim 8', 12'; Lee Ei Woo	Stadium: Dhaka Stadium; Referee: Sheikh Shaheb Ali (Pakistan)

=== 1963 Aga Khan Gold Cup ===
==== Matches ====
Win Draw Loss

13 October 1963 Qualifying stage	Pakistan Airlines	3–0	(Pakistan) PWD	Dhaka, Pakistan
	Sayeed 28'; Changeez Khan 38' (?)	Report		Stadium: Dhaka Stadium; Referee: M.A. Munshi (Pakistan)

Pos	Team	Pld	W	D	L	GF	GA	GD	Pts	Qualification
1	(Pakistan) Mohammedan	3	3	0	0	8	2	+6	6	Advance to the Semi-finals
2	Indonesia U23	3	1	0	2	7	7	0	2	Advance to the Semi-finals
3	(Pakistan) Warsak	3	1	0	2	5	6	−1	2	
4	(Pakistan) PIA	3	1	0	2	3	8	−5	2	

17 October 1963 Group stage	Pakistan Airlines	3–0	(Pakistan) Warsak	Dhaka, Pakistan
	Sarfaz 39', 65' (?)	Report		Stadium: Dhaka Stadium; Referee: Masudur Rahman (Pakistan)

19 October 1963 Group stage	Pakistan Airlines	3–2	Indonesia U23	Dhaka, Pakistan
	Sayeed 3', 10' (?)	Report	Alvandu 32'; Soemarno 40'	Stadium: Dhaka Stadium; Referee: Isa Khan (Pakistan)

21 October 1963 Group stage	Pakistan Airlines	0–3	(Pakistan) Mohammedan	Dhaka, Pakistan
		Report	Rahmatullah 12'; Pratap 25'; Moosa 61'	Stadium: Dhaka Stadium; Referee: Masudur Rahman (Pakistan)

=== 1964 Aga Khan Gold Cup ===
==== Matches ====
Win Draw Loss

21 October 1964 Qualifying stage	Pakistan Airlines	0–5	Pakistan Western Railway	Dhaka, Pakistan
		Report	Saleem 10', 22'; Idrees Sr. 25', 30'; Qayyum 51'	Stadium: Dhaka Stadium; Referee: Zahurul Alam (Pakistan)

=== 1968 Aga Khan Gold Cup ===
==== Matches ====
Win Draw Loss

30 October 1968 Qualifying stage	Pakistan Airlines	3–1	(Pakistan) Warsak	Dhaka, Pakistan
	Allah Bakhsh 15', 60'; Ali Nawaz 23'	Report	Jehangir 62'	Stadium: Dhaka Stadium; Referee: Issa Khan (Pakistan)

Pos	Team	Pld	W	D	L	GF	GA	GD	Pts	Qualification
1	(Pakistan) EPIDC	2	2	0	0	4	2	+2	4	Advance to the Semi-finals
2	Indonesia XI	2	1	0	1	5	3	+2	2	Advance to the Semi-finals
3	Pakistan Airlines	2	0	0	2	2	6	−4	0	

Source: Pakistan Observer

1 November 1968 Group stage	Pakistan Airlines	1–2	(Pakistan) EPIDC	Dhaka, Pakistan
	Allah Bakhsh	Report	Hasheem 14'; Ayub 67'	Stadium: Dhaka Stadium; Referee: Zahurul Alam (Pakistan)

3 November 1968 Group stage	Pakistan Airlines	1–4	Indonesia XI	Dhaka, Pakistan
	Siddik 50'	Report	Iswadi 25', 26', 40'; Waskito	Stadium: Dhaka Stadium; Referee: Zahurul Alam (Pakistan)

=== 1970 Aga Khan Gold Cup ===
11 October 1970 Qualifying stage	Pakistan Airlines	1–0	(Pakistan) EP WAPDA	Dhaka, Pakistan
	Allah Bakhsh 20'	Report		Stadium: Dhaka Stadium; Referee: S.A. Rashid (Pakistan)

Pos	Team	Pld	W	D	L	GF	GA	GD	Pts	Qualification
1	(Indonesia) Persebaya Surabaya	3	2	1	0	4	1	+3	5	Advance to the semi-finals
2	(Pakistan) Dhaka Mohammedan	3	1	2	0	5	3	+2	4	Advance to the semi-finals
3	(Pakistan) Dhaka Wanderers	3	0	2	1	3	4	−1	2	
4	Pakistan Airlines	3	0	1	2	1	5	−4	1	

Source: RSSSF

14 October 1970 Group stage	Pakistan Airlines	0–2	(Pakistan) Dhaka Mohammedan	Dhaka, Pakistan
		Report	Idrees Sr. 27'; Dar 38'	Stadium: Dhaka Stadium; Referee: Zahurul Alam (Pakistan)

16 October 1970 Group stage	Dhaka Wanderers (Pakistan)	1–1	Pakistan Airlines	Dhaka, Pakistan
	Moosa 2'	Report	Jani 15'	Stadium: Dhaka Stadium; Referee: Zahurul Alam (Pakistan)

21 October 1970 Group stage	Pakistan Airlines	0–2	(Indonesia) Persebaya Surabaya	Dhaka, Pakistan
		Report	Lesmana 4'; Abdillah	Stadium: Dhaka Stadium; Referee: S.A. Rashid (Pakistan)

=== 1977–78 Aga Khan Gold Cup ===
==== Known Results ====
Win Draw Loss

7 December 1977 Group stage	Pakistan Airlines	1–1	(Bangladesh) Brothers Union	Dhaka, Bangladesh
	Afzal Qasim	Report	Bablu 41'	Stadium: Dhaka Stadium

11 December 1977 Group stage	Pakistan Airlines	0–1	(Thailand) Bangkok Bank	Dhaka, Bangladesh
			Senchaovanich 69'	Stadium: Dhaka Stadium; Referee: Soetoya

16 December 1977 Group stage	Pakistan Airlines	2–2	Bangladesh Army	Dhaka, Bangladesh
	Wahid Sr. Iftikhar		Akkas Miah 34' Naruttam 48'	Stadium: Dhaka Stadium

19 December 1977 Group stage	Pakistan Airlines	1–0	(Bangladesh) Abahani Krira Chakra	Dhaka, Bangladesh
	Iftikhar 39'	Report		Stadium: Dhaka Stadium

26 December 1977 Group stage	Pakistan Airlines	3–3	(Malaysia) Penang	Dhaka, Bangladesh
	Idrees; Amir Bakhsh	Report	Isa Bakar; Noordin	Stadium: Dhaka Stadium

=== 1981–82 Aga Khan Gold Cup ===
==== Group stage ====
Pos	Team	Pld	W	D	L	GF	GA	GD	Pts	Qualification
1	Oman	4	2	2	0	7	3	+4	6	Advance to the semi-finals
2	(Bangladesh) Dhaka Mohammedan	4	2	2	0	8	5	+3	6	Advance to the semi-finals
3	(Bangladesh) BJMC	4	1	2	1	2	2	0	4	
4	Pakistan Airlines	4	1	1	2	4	6	−2	3	
5	(Singapore) Farrer Park United	4	0	1	3	4	9	−5	1	

Source: RSSSF

==== Matches ====
Win Draw Loss

2 January 1982 Group stage	Pakistan Airlines	0–0	(Bangladesh) BJMC	Dhaka, Bangladesh
		Report		Stadium: Dhaka Stadium

5 January 1982 Group stage	Pakistan Airlines	0–3	Oman	Dhaka, Bangladesh
		Report	Salem Jumaan 32'; Younis Amaan 67'; Nasser Hamdan 73'	Stadium: Dhaka Stadium

7 January 1982 Group stage	Pakistan Airlines	4–2	(Singapore) Farrer Park United	Dhaka, Bangladesh
	Idrees 14', 29'; Shah 82'; Wahid Sr. 87'	Report	Nasir Jalil 26'; Jerry Lewis 85'	Stadium: Dhaka Stadium

10 January 1982 Group stage	Pakistan Airlines	0–1	(Bangladesh) Dhaka Mohammedan	Dhaka, Bangladesh
		Report	Rama 30' (pen.)	Stadium: Dhaka Stadium

=== 1982–83 DCM Trophy ===
Pos	Team	Pld	W	D	L	GF	GA	GD	Pts	Qualification
1	(India) Kolkata Mohammedan	4	3	1	0	10	2	+8	7	Advance to the semi-finals
2	(India) Mafatlal	4	1	2	1	5	3	+2	4	Advance to the semi-finals
3	(Australia) East Fremantle Tricolore	4	2	0	2	6	5	+1	4	
4	(India) Gorka Brigade	4	1	1	2	5	6	−1	3	
5	Pakistan Airlines	4	1	0	3	2	12	−10	2	

Source: RSSSF

==== Matches ====
Win Draw Loss

19 December 1982 Group stage	Pakistan Airlines	0–3	(India) Mafatlal	India
		Report

22 December 1982 Group stage	Pakistan Airlines	1–0	(India) Gorkha Brigade	India
		Report

24 December 1982 Group stage	Pakistan Airlines	0–4	(Australia) East Frimantle Tricolore	India
		Report

28 December 1982 Group stage	Pakistan Airlines	1–5	(India) Kolkata Mohammedan	India
		Report

=== 1991 TAAN Cup ===
In September 1991, PIA participated in the TAAN (Trekking Agencies Association of Nepal) Cup tournament, held in Kathmandhu, Nepal. The team finished in third place, with PIA player Fida Ur Rehman ending as top goal-scorer with 6 goals.

18 September 1991 Group stage	Pakistan Airlines	1–1	Nepal Reserves	Kathmandu, Nepal
		Report

September 1991 Group stage	Pakistan Airlines	N/A	(Russia) Aeroflot	Kathmandu, Nepal
		Report

September 1991 Group stage	Pakistan Airlines	N/A	Malaysia Reserves	Kathmandu, Nepal
		Report

24 September 1991 Semifinal	Pakistan Airlines	1–2	(Singapore) Tiong Bahru CSC	Kathmandu, Nepal
	Ejaz 65'	Report	Rafi Ali; Abdul Latif

September 1991 Third place	Pakistan Airlines	N/A	(Germany) Lufthansa	Kathmandu, Nepal

== PIA International Tours ==
=== Abu Dhabi tour, 1976 ===
At the end of the year, an 18-member PIA team captained by Abdul Jabbar, toured Abu Dhabi for seven days from 16 December 1976 and played two exhibition matches there.

== Matches against foreign touring teams ==
=== Hopei XI, 1975 ===
In July 1975, the Chinese Hopei provincial team visited Pakistan playing several matches across the country. PIA drew the match against the visitors in Rawalpindi.

July 1975 Friendly	Pakistan Airlines	N/A	(China) Hopei XI	Rawalpindi, Pakistan

=== Berlin University, 1978 ===
On 9 March 1978, PIA played against the Berlin University football team from Germany at the KMC Stadium. The Germans ultimately won the match by three goals to one.

9 March 1978 Friendly	Pakistan Airlines	1–3	(Germany) Berlin University	Karachi, Pakistan
				Stadium: KMC Stadium
