= 1982 Quaid-e-Azam International Tournament =

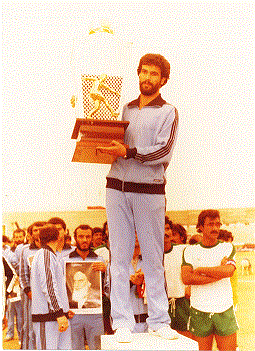
- Iran captain Mahmoud Haghighian with the 1982 Quaid-e-Azam International Tournament trophy

Tournament details
- Host country: Pakistan
- Dates: 12–24 February 1982
- Teams: 7 (from 1 confederation)
- Venue: National Stadium

Final positions
- Champions: Iran (1st title)
- Runners-up: Pakistan Blues
- Third place: Pakistan Greens

Tournament statistics
- Matches played: 21
- Goals scored: 49 (2.33 per match)
- Top scorer(s): (Iran) Kamil Anjini (Pakistan) Mahmood Anwar (5 goals)
- Best player: (Iran) Abdolali Changiz

The 1982 Quaid-e-Azam International Tournament was the second edition of the Quaid-e-Azam International Tournament. The event was held at the National Stadium in Karachi, Pakistan.

== Venue ==
Karachi	1982 Quaid-e-Azam International Tournament is located in Pakistan
National Stadium	1982 Quaid-e-Azam International Tournament is located in Pakistan
Capacity: 30,000	1982 Quaid-e-Azam International Tournament is located in Pakistan

== Squads ==
Source: RSSSF

=== Bangladesh ===
Head coach: (Bangladesh) Abdul Gafur Baloch

No.	Pos.	Player	Date of birth (age)	Caps	Club
	GK	Shahidur Rahman Shantoo	17 November 1947 (aged 34)		(Bangladesh) Brothers Union
	GK	Lal Mohammad	1956 (aged 26)		(Bangladesh) Dhaka Mohammedan
	DF	Abul Hossain	2 July 1957 (aged 24)		(Bangladesh) Dhaka Mohammedan
	DF	Azmat Ali	15 March 1956 (aged 25)		(Bangladesh) Brothers Union
	DF	Sawpan Kumar Das	10 November 1958 (aged 23)		(Bangladesh) Dhaka Mohammedan
	DF	Dewan Shafiul Arefin Tutul	1 March 1960 (aged 21)		(Bangladesh) Brothers Union
	DF	Mazidul Islam Moni			(Bangladesh) Dhaka Abahani
	MF	Hasanuzzaman Khan Bablu	5 May 1955 (aged 26)		(Bangladesh) Brothers Union
	MF	Ashish Bhadra	14 March 1960 (aged 21)		(Bangladesh) Dhaka Abahani
	FW	Khandoker Wasim Iqbal	21 November 1961 (aged 20)		(Bangladesh) Brothers Union
	FW	Abdus Salam Murshedy	6 October 1963 (aged 18)		(Bangladesh) Dhaka Mohammedan
	FW	Sheikh Mohammad Aslam	1 March 1958 (aged 23)		(Bangladesh) Team BJMC
	FW	Ashraf Uddin Ahmed Chunnu (captain)	1 August 1956 (aged 25)		(Bangladesh) Dhaka Abahani
	FW	Badal Roy	4 July 1957 (aged 24)		(Bangladesh) Dhaka Mohammedan
	FW	Golam Rabbani Helal			(Bangladesh) Dhaka Abahani

=== Iran ===
Head coach: (Iran) Nasser Ebrahimi

No.	Pos.	Player	Date of birth (age)	Caps	Club
	GK	Nader Faryadshiran	15 December 1954 (aged 27)		(Iran) Shahin Tehran
	GK	Vazgen Safarian	10 June 1954 (aged 27)		(Iran) Ararat Tehran
	DF	Ruhollah Ebadzadeh	22 March 1960 (aged 21)		(Iran) Persepolis
	DF	Ebrahim Tahmasebi	27 May 1954 (aged 27)		(Iran) Persepolis
	DF	Amir Marzoughi	21 April 1957 (aged 24)		(Iran) Shahin Tehran
	DF	Mohammad Panjali	26 July 1955 (aged 26)		(Iran) Persepolis
	DF	Hamid Farzamnia	7 August 1959 (aged 22)		(Iran) Niroye Zamini
		Mehdi Fardalinia			
	DF	Mehdi Dinvarzadeh	12 March 1955 (aged 26)		(Iran) Shahin Tehran
	MF	Mahmoud Haghighian (captain)	16 November 1954 (aged 27)		(Iran) Shahin Tehran
	FW	Abbas Kargar	21 March 1956 (aged 25)		(Iran) Persepolis
	MF	Mohammad Mayeli Kohan	20 June 1954 (aged 27)		(Iran) Persepolis
	MF	Saeid Maragehchian	17 March 1957 (aged 24)		(Iran) Esteghlal
		Manouchehr Taherkhani			
	FW	Abdolali Changiz	13 March 1959 (aged 22)		(Iran) Esteghlal
	FW	Kamil Anjini	7 May 1954 (aged 27)		(Iran) Tehranjavan
	FW	Nasser Mohammadkhani	7 September 1957 (aged 24)		(Iran) Persepolis
	FW	Alireza Heidari	6 January 1955 (aged 27)		(Iran) Persepolis

=== Nepal ===
Head coach: (China) Zeng Shi Chui

No.	Pos.	Player	Date of birth (age)	Caps	Club
	MF	Rupak Raj Sharma (captain)	21 March 1954 (aged 27)		
		Ashok K.C.			
	GK	Lok Bahadur Shahi	12 December 1956 (aged 25)		
		G.Shrestha			
	DF	Suresh Panthi			(Nepal) Boys Union Club
	DF	Bhakta Raj Karnikar			
	DF	Dhirendra Pradhan			
		Narendra Bahadur Shrestha			
	MF	Shree Ram Ranjitkar			
		Bidur Bista			
	MF	Man Bahadur Malla			
	MF	Krishna Thapa	8 August 1955 (aged 26)		
	FW	Narendra Man Singh			(India) Mafatlal
	DF	Raju Kaji Shakya	7 July 1960 (aged 21)		(Nepal) New Road Team
	MF	Ganesh Thapa	9 October 1960 (aged 21)		(Bangladesh) Dhaka Abahani
		Binaya Shrestha			
		Deepak Bajracharya			

=== Oman ===
Head coach: (Tunisia) Moncef Melliti

No.	Pos.	Player	Date of birth (age)	Caps	Club
		Mohammed Salem Muflah			
		Suleiman Mohammed Khalef			
		Abdul-Rahman Awadh			
		Khalil Mourad			
		Hadib Khamis			
		Salem Juma (captain)			
		Mohammed Juma			
		Abdullah Hamoud			
		Juma Habib			
		Nasser Hamdan			
	MF	Ghulam Khamis	1959 (aged 23)		(Oman) Ahli Sidab Club
		Karim Bakhsh			
		Salim Awadh			
		Abdul-Wahid Qasim			
		Mohammed Saeed Musayeda			
		Thani Nassib			
		Saeed Fayil			
		Salim Ali Mansour			
		Mousa Hindawi			

=== Pakistan Greens ===
Head coach: (Pakistan) Younus Rana

No.	Pos.	Player	Date of birth (age)	Caps	Club
	GK	Pervez Ramzan			Pakistan Air Force
	GK	Sajid Hussain			Pakistan Airlines
	DF	Naeem Gul	27 February 1954 (aged 27)		Pakistan Airlines
	DF	Shaukat Ali Alvi			
	DF	Muhammad Jan			
	DF	Shaukat Mufti	10 January 1955 (aged 27)		(Pakistan) National Bank
	DF	Muhammad Akbar Raisani (captain)	1953 (aged 29)		(Pakistan) National Bank
	DF	Ayaz Butt	27 September 1957 (aged 24)		(Pakistan)
	FW	Naushad Baloch	1960 (aged 22)		(Pakistan) Habib Bank
	MF	Nasir Abbas	23 March 1959 (aged 22)		(Pakistan) KMC
	MF	Shamim Khan	15 December 1955 (aged 26)		Pakistan Airlines
	MF	Qazi Asif	7 May 1950 (aged 31)		(Pakistan) National Bank
	FW	Abdul Wahid			Pakistan Airlines
	FW	Muhammad Saleem			Pakistan Airlines
	FW	Abdul Shakoor			
	FW	Muhammad Ejaz Kara			(Pakistan) KMC
	FW	Muhammad Fiaz			
	FW	Muhammad Ali Shah			Pakistan Airlines
	FW	Muhammad Rasheed	20 March 1956 (aged 25)		Pakistan Railways

=== Pakistan Blues ===
Head coach: (Pakistan) Murad Bakhsh

No.	Pos.	Player	Date of birth (age)	Caps	Club
		Tahir Jamshed			
		Ajmal			
		Lal Muhammad			
		Muhammad Talib			
		Muhammad Siddiq Raisani			
		Mahmood Ahmed (captain)			
		Muhammad Rashid Jr.			
		Nafees Ahmed			
		Abdul Latif			(Pakistan) Habib Bank
		Muhammad Zulfiqar	1957 (aged 25)		Pakistan Airlines
		Abid Hussain			
		Abdul Ghafoor			
		Khalid Butt	30 November 1958 (aged 23)		(Pakistan) WAPDA
		Muhammad Sharif			
		Muhammad Faqir			
		Mahmood Anwar	1 January 1960 (aged 22)		Pakistan Airlines
		Shahid Ahmad			
		Najeeb Ullah Najmi	10 October 1958 (aged 23)		Pakistan Air Force
		Muhammad Bashir			

=== Shandong ===
Head coach: (China) Li Zhongwei

No.	Pos.	Player	Date of birth (age)	Caps	Club
		Song Zhongsheng			(China) Shandong
		Dai Renqing			(China) Shandong
		Zhang Chonglai			(China) Shandong
		Yang Peiheng			(China) Shandong
		Sun Chongjun			(China) Shandong
		Zhang Luodi			(China) Shandong
		Guo Kuowei			(China) Shandong
		Yin Tiesheng	16 August 1956 (aged 25)		(China) Shandong
		Wang Dezhang			(China) Shandong
		Qu Gang			(China) Shandong
	FW	Xu Yonglai (captain)	16 August 1954 (aged 27)		(China) Shandong
		Zou Xinguang			(China) Shandong
		Liu Luoyang			(China) Shandong
		Wang Baocheng			(China) Shandong
		Luo Xucheng			(China) Shandong

== Results ==
Pos	Team	Pld	W	D	L	GF	GA	GD	Pts	Final result
1	Iran	6	5	1	0	22	1	+21	11	Champions
2	Pakistan Blues	6	3	2	1	8	8	0	8	
3	Pakistan Greens	6	2	2	2	5	6	−1	6	
4	Oman	6	2	2	2	5	7	−2	6	
5	(China) Shandong	6	1	3	2	5	4	+1	5	
6	Nepal	6	1	2	3	3	9	−6	4	
7	Bangladesh	6	0	2	4	4	17	−13	2	

Source: RSSSF

== Matches ==
12 February 1982

Pakistan Greens	2–0	Nepal
Abdul Shakoor (?)	Report

National Stadium, Karachi
Referee: (Oman) Mohsen Abdul-Rahman

13 February 1982

Pakistan Blues	2–1	Oman
Anwar (?)	Report	Nasser Hamdan (?)

National Stadium, Karachi
Referee: (Nepal) Shrestha

14 February 1982

Pakistan Blues	1–1	Nepal
Shahid Ahmad (?)	Report	Rupak Raj Sharma 90' (pen.)

National Stadium, Karachi
Referee: (Iran) Behman Bahadur

14 February 1982

Oman	0–0	(China) Shandong
	Report

National Stadium, Karachi
Referee: (Pakistan) Sultan Jindrani

15 February 1982

Pakistan Blues	2–1	Bangladesh
Zulfiqar 59'; Anwar 73'	Report	Murshedy 46'

National Stadium, Karachi
Referee: (Nepal) Shrestha

15 February 1982

Iran	0–0	(China) Shandong
	Report

National Stadium, Karachi
Referee: (Pakistan) Sardar Ali Dara

16 February 1982

Iran	1–0	Pakistan Greens
Kamil Anjini 7'	Report

National Stadium, Karachi
Referee: (Oman) Mohsen Abdul-Rahman

16 February 1982

Nepal	1–1	Bangladesh
Bidur Bista 86'	Report	Bhadra (?)

National Stadium, Karachi
Referee: (Pakistan) Anwar Sultan Bhatti

17 February 1982

Oman	1–0	Nepal
Mousa Hindawi 29'	Report

National Stadium, Karachi
Referee: (Pakistan) Syed Karimuddin Nawab

17 February 1982

Pakistan Blues	2–1	(China) Shandong
Anwar 5' (?)	Report	Wang Dezhang 10'

National Stadium, Karachi
Referee: (Iran) Behman Bahadur

18 February 1982

Iran	4–1	Pakistan Blues
Kargar 3'; Kamil Anjini 59'; Mayeli (?); Mahmoud Haghighian (?)	Report	Zulfiqar 65'

National Stadium, Karachi
Referee: (Nepal) Shrestha

18 February 1982

Pakistan Greens	2–1	Bangladesh
Naushad Baloch (?)	Report	Wasim (?)

National Stadium, Karachi
Referee: (Iran) Behman Bahadur

19 February 1982

Shandong (China)	0–1	Nepal
	Report	Thapa 79'

National Stadium, Karachi
Referee: (Pakistan) Mohammad Aslam

19 February 1982

Oman	3–1	Bangladesh
Nasser Hamdan 40'; Khalil Mourad 43'; Mohammed Saeed Musayeda 67'	Report	Chunnu (?)

National Stadium, Karachi
Referee: (Pakistan) Sultan Jindrani

20 February 1982

Iran	4–0	Nepal
Ali-Reza Heydari 2'; Dinvarzadeh (?); Mehdi Fardalinia 50'; Changiz 62' (pen.)	Report

National Stadium, Karachi
Referee: (Pakistan) Anwar Sultan Bhatti

20 February 1982

Pakistan Greens	1–4	(China) Shandong
Wahid 26'	Report	Zou Xinguang 8'; Zhang Luodi (?); Wang Dezhang 80'; Qu Gang 84'

National Stadium, Karachi

21 February 1982

Iran	4–0	Oman
Changiz 27'; Mahmoud Haghighian (?); Ebrahim Tahmasebi (?); Kamil Anjini 76'	Report

National Stadium, Karachi
Referee: (Pakistan) Syed Karimuddin Nawab

22 February 1982

Shandong (China)	0–0	Bangladesh
	Report

National Stadium, Karachi
Referee: (Pakistan) Sardar Ali Dara

23 February 1982

Pakistan Blues	0–0	Pakistan Greens
	Report

National Stadium, Karachi
Referee: (Iran) Behman Bahadur

23 February 1982

Iran	9–0	Bangladesh
Ali-Reza Heydari 7', 38'; Mehdi Fardalinia 22', 44'; Ebrahim Tahmasebi 58'; Changiz 66', 70'; Kamil Anjini 79', 88'	Report

National Stadium, Karachi
Referee: (Oman) Mohsen Abdul-Rahman

24 February 1982

Pakistan Greens	0–0	Oman
	Report

National Stadium, Karachi
Referee: (Iran) Behman Bahadur

== Statistics ==
=== Goalscorers ===
There were 52 goals scored in 21 matches, for an average of 2.48 goals per match.

5 goals

- (Iran) Kamil Anjini
- (Pakistan) Mahmood Anwar

4 goals

- (Iran) Abdolali Changiz

3 goals

- (Iran) Ali-Reza Heydari
- (Iran) Mehdi Fardalinia

2 goals

- (Oman) Nasser Hamdan
- (Pakistan) Muhammad Zulfiqar
- (China) Wang Dezhang
- (Pakistan) Abdul Shakoor
- (Pakistan) Naushad Baloch
- (Iran) Mahmoud Haghighian
- (Iran) Ebrahim Tahmasebi

1 goal

- (Bangladesh) Khandoker Wasim Iqbal
- (Pakistan) Shahid Ahmad
- (Pakistan) Abdul Wahid
- (Bangladesh) Ashraf Uddin Ahmed Chunnu
- (Bangladesh) Abdus Salam Murshedy
- (Nepal) Rupak Raj Sharma
- (Nepal) Bidur Bista
- (Bangladesh) Ashish Bhadra
- (Oman) Mousa Hindawi
- (Iran) Abbas Kargar
- (Iran) Mohammad Mayeli Kohan
- (Oman) Khalil Mourad
- (Iran) Mohammed Saeed Musayeda
- (Iran) Mehdi Dinvarzadeh
- (China) Zou Xinguang
- (China) Zhang Luodi
- (China) Qu Gang
- (Nepal) Ganesh Thapa

== Awards ==
Most Valuable Player	Top Scorer
(Iran) Abdolali Changiz	(Iran) Kamil Anjini (Pakistan) Mahmood Anwar (5 goals)
