= 1960 Aga Khan Gold Cup =

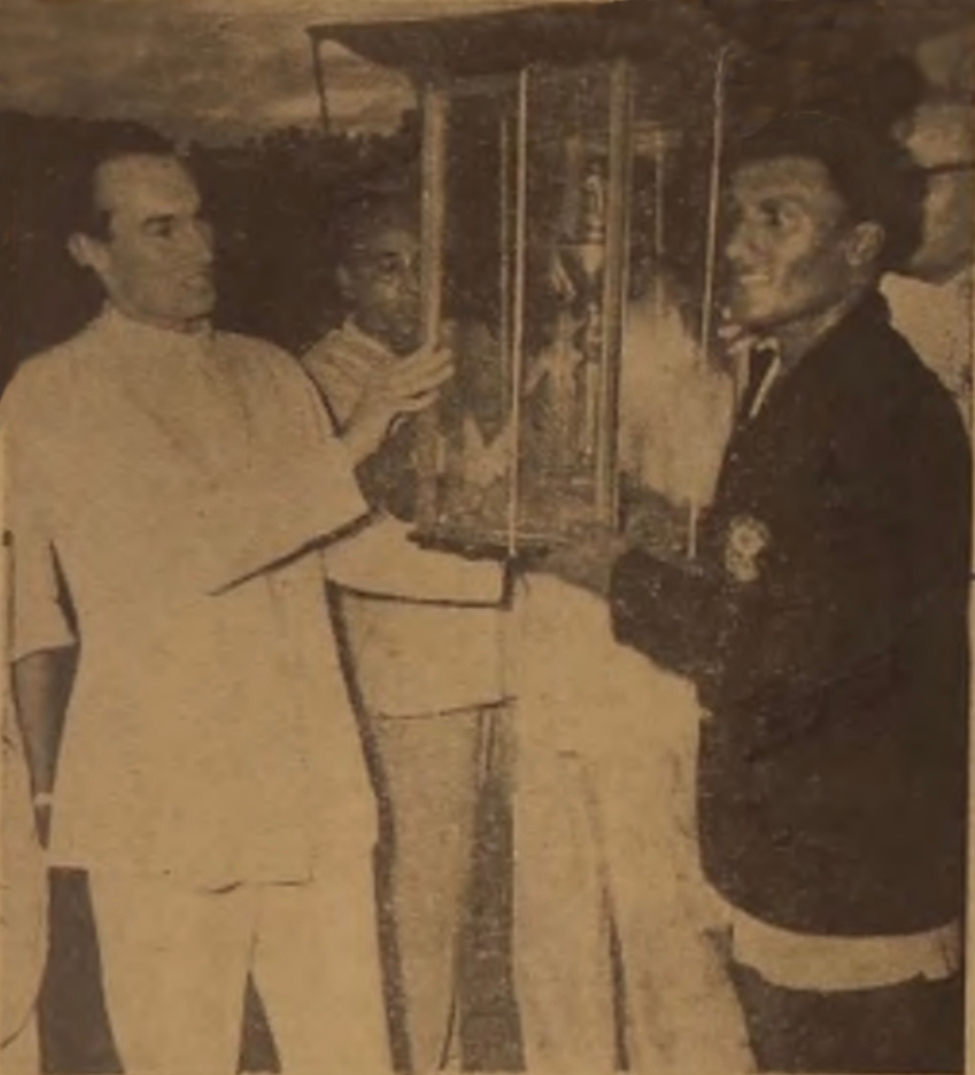
- Muhammad Umer receiving the Aga Khan Gold Cup trophy from Aga Khan IV on 11 October 1960.

Tournament details
- Country: East Pakistan, (Now Bangladesh)
- Venue: Dacca Stadium
- Dates: 12 September 1960 – 11 October 1960

Final positions
- Champions: (India) Kolkata Mohammedan
- Runners-up: (Indonesia) PSM Makassar

Tournament statistics
- Top goal scorer: (India) Mohammed Rahmatullah (10 goals)

The 1960 Aga Khan Gold Cup was the third edition of the Aga Khan Gold Cup. Organized by the East Pakistan Sports Federation, with the games being held at the Dacca Stadium, from 12 September till 11 October 1960, matches lasted 70 minutes, with 5 minutes recess.

== First Round ==
12 September 1960

Pakistan Eastern Rifles	1–0	DC Mills (Pakistan)
Ismail 25'	Report

Dacca Stadium, Dacca

13 September 1960

Azad Sporting (Pakistan)	5–1	Police (Pakistan)
	Report

Dacca Stadium, Dacca

14 September 1960

Wari Club (Pakistan)	2–2	Pakistan Eastern Railway
Samad 29'		Shankar 12'

Dacca Stadium, Dacca
Referee: Sheikh Shaheb Ali (Pakistan)

15 September 1960

Fire Service (Pakistan)	5–0	Bakerganj F. A. (Pakistan)
Malik; Zaman; Jalal	Report

Dacca Stadium, Dacca
Referee: Sgt. Rahman (Pakistan)

16 September 1960

Dacca Wanderers (Pakistan)	10–0	Faridpur F. A. (Pakistan)
Moosa Jr. 5'; Raymond 9'; Yaqub; Rabbani; Muree

Dacca Stadium, Dacca
Referee: M. Nawaz (Pakistan)

17 September 1960

Dhaka Mohammedan (Pakistan)	1–1	Fire Service (Pakistan)
Sadeq		Rahim

Dacca Stadium, Dacca
Referee: K. Rahman (Pakistan)

18 September 1960

Pakistan Army	5–0	Dacca University (Pakistan)
Sikander Ali 14', 15'; Abul Khair 40', 42'; Barkharder 60'	Report

Dacca Stadium, Dacca
Referee: Sheikh Shaheb Ali (Pakistan)

=== Replay ===
19 September 1960

Pakistan Eastern Railway	3–1	Wari Club (Pakistan)
Mahmood 34'		Islam 35', 70'; Shankar 50'

Dacca Stadium, Dacca

=== Replay ===
20 September 1960

Dhaka Mohammedan (Pakistan)	6–0	Fire Service (Pakistan)
Ashraf 5'; Aboojan 30' ? 5' (o.g.); Sadeq 60'	Report

Dacca Stadium, Dacca
Referee: M. Nawaz (Pakistan)

== Second round ==
24 September 1960

Pakistan Airlines	2–1 (Abandoned)	Dacca Wanderers (Pakistan)
Changez 26', 30'	Report	Rabbani 9'

Dacca Stadium, Dacca
Referee: Sheikh Shaheb Ali (Pakistan)

25 September 1960

Al-Hilal (Pakistan)	1–1	Pakistan Eastern Railway
Jehan 62'		Badal 69'

Dacca Stadium, Dacca
Referee: Noor Hossain (Pakistan)

25 September 1960

Pakistan Moghuls	1–0	PWD (Pakistan)
	Report

Dacca Stadium, Dacca

=== Replay ===
27 September 1960

Al-Hilal (Pakistan)	4–0	Pakistan Eastern Railway
Jehan; Abid		Shankar 25'

Dacca Stadium, Dacca
Referee: S. Ali (Pakistan)

27 September 1960

Azad Sporting (Pakistan)	2–1	502 Workshop (Pakistan)
Zamboo; Manna 25'	Report	Sami

Dacca Stadium, Dacca
Referee: Masudur Rahman (Pakistan)

== Third round ==
28 September 1960

Al-Hilal (Pakistan)	1–0	Pakistan Army
Talib 18'	Report

Dacca Stadium, Dacca
Referee: S. Ali (Pakistan)

29 September 1960

Baloch XI (Pakistan)	3–1	East Pakistan Rifles
Ghani 37'; Nabi Bakhsh 66'	Report	Ismail 22'

Dacca Stadium, Dacca
Referee: Stg. Rahman (Pakistan)

1 October 1960

Azad Sporting (Pakistan)	5–1	Muslim Sports (Pakistan)
Manna; Batu 50'

Dacca Stadium, Dacca

=== Replay ===
2 October 1960

Dacca Wanderers (Pakistan)	2–2	Pakistan Airlines
Muree 1'; Raymond 4'		Ejaz Rasool 28'; Changez 54'

Dacca Stadium, Dacca
Referee: Masudur Rahman (Pakistan)

=== Second Replay ===
4 October 1960

Dacca Wanderers (Pakistan)	3–2	Pakistan Airlines
Muree 16'; Rabbani; Yaqub	Report	Abdullah 10'; Lari 65' (pen.)

Dacca Stadium, Dacca
Referee: S. Ali (Pakistan)

== Quarter-finals ==
30 September 1960

Pakistan Moghuls	2–1	Dhaka Mohammedan (Pakistan)
Taj Sr. 21'; Anwar 32' (pen.)		Ghaznavi 51' (pen.)

Dacca Stadium, Dacca
Referee: M. Nawaz (Pakistan)

3 October 1960

PSM Makassar (Indonesia)	8–1	Al-Hilal (Pakistan)
Noor Salam 9'; Mannan; Kurnia; Suwardi 50', 60'		Jehan 35'

Dacca Stadium, Dacca
Referee: Masudur Rahman (Pakistan)

5 October 1960

Kolkata Mohammedan (India)	7–0	Azad Sporting (Pakistan)
Moosa 9'; Rahmatullah 25', 30', 41', 45', 59', 70'	Report

Dacca Stadium, Dacca
Attendance: 15,000
Referee: S. Ali (Pakistan)

6 October 1960

Dacca Wanderers (Pakistan)	3–1	Baloch XI (Pakistan)
Badsha 7'; Yaqub; Rabbani 53'	Report	Amin (pen.)

Dacca Stadium, Dacca
Referee: Masudur Rahman (Pakistan)

== Semi-finals ==
7 October 1960

Kolkata Mohammedan (India)	5–2	Pakistan Moghuls
Umer 27'; Moosa 28'; Rahmatullah	Report	Anwar 10' (pen.); Kasem 69'

Dacca Stadium, Dacca
Referee: Masudur Rahman (Pakistan)

8 October 1960

PSM Makassar (Indonesia)	8–0	Dacca Wanderers (Pakistan)
Kurnia; Ramang; Suwardi; Noor Salam	Report

Dacca Stadium, Dacca
Attendance: 20,000
Referee: Masudur Rahman (Pakistan)

== Final ==
=== Match ===
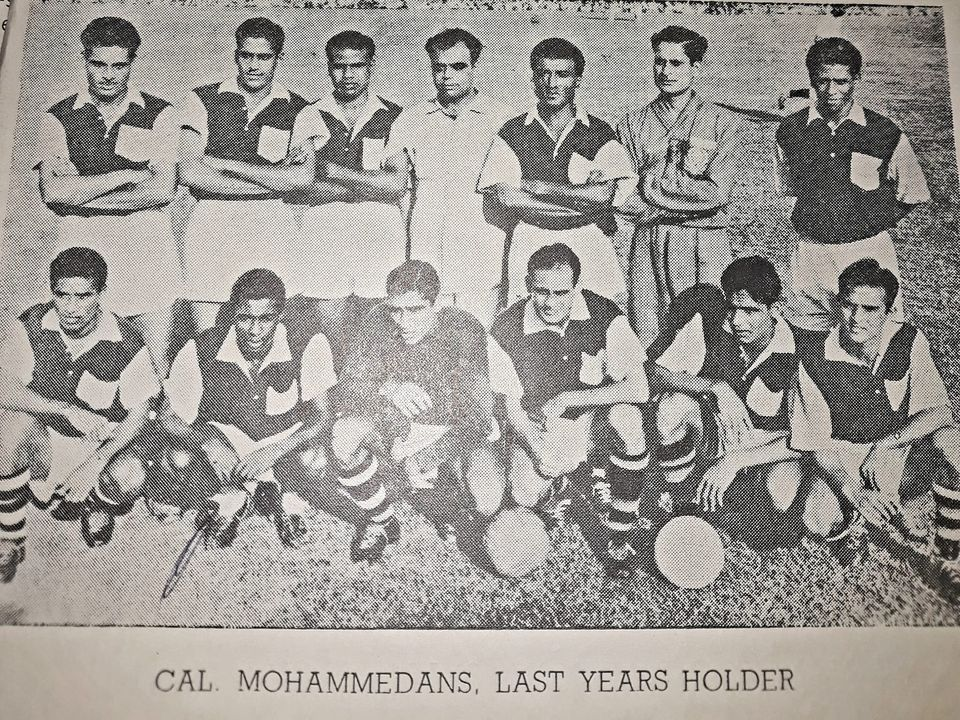
Kolkata Mohammedan squad pictured before the final.

The final took place on 11 October 1960, at the Dacca Stadium, with a jam-packed 40,000 spectators looking on. Kolkata Mohammedan and PSM Makassar would clash against each other, the match began on a quick note, with the Indian side taking the lead in the very first minute through forward, Zafar, after a quick combination of passes between Rahmatullah and Umer found Zafar free, with the latter giving his team the lead. Another chance was enabled in the 13th minute, in which Moosa shot a half-volleyball, which went wide. After several back and forth movements between both teams, Kolkata Mohammedan would increase their lead through star striker Umer, who scored from a cross by Zafar.

The second-half saw the Mohammedan's continue dominating the game, after two corner-kicks near the 24th minute. They would consolidate their lead through Umer again, who found the net open after several attempts at the goalpost of the opposition. Right afterwards, Mohammedan would continue pressing, and won the ball, Inside forward Mohammed Rahmatullah quickly shot out from 30 yards and found the back of the net, which gave Kolkata Mohammedan a lead of 4–0, just before the end of the game, the Indonesian side made a good move, which resulted in Noor Salam reducing the margin, scoring from a difficult angle.

11 October 1960

Kolkata Mohammedan (India)	4–1	PSM Makassar (Indonesia)
Zafar 1'; Umer 34', 61'; Rahmatullah 62'	Report	Noor Salam 69'

Dacca Stadium, Dacca
Attendance: 40,000
Referee: Masudur Rahman (Pakistan)

=== Line-ups ===
- Kolkata Mohammedan: Rehman, Musthaq, Hussain Ahmed, Abdul Ghafoor, Abid Hussain Ghazi, Mohammad Ali, Zafar, (Note: Name is spelt as "Jaffer" by Dawn sources.) Mohammad Rahmatullah, Muhammad Umer, Latif Khan, Moosa Ghazi.
- PSM Makassar: Harry Tjong, Sampara, Rairatu, Rashid, Simon, Itjing, Mannan, Suwardi Arland, Andi Ramang, Noor Salam, Kurnia.
