= Baloch Eleven FC =

Pakistani football club

- Full name: Baloch Eleven Football Club
- Short name: Baloch XI

Baloch Eleven Football Club also known as Baloch XI, is a football club based in the Lyari locality of Karachi, Pakistan. The club was among the prominent football teams of Karachi during the 1950s and 1960s, notably participating in the Aga Khan Gold Cup.

== History ==
From the 1950s, the team already started competing in the Karachi First Division Football League. In the late 1950s, the team started competing in the Ismail Gold Shield Football Tournament held in Multan which featured several foreign teams.

In 1961, the team won the All-Pakistan Quaid-i-Azam Football Tournament in Multan, defeating Karachi Port Trust in the final.

In the 1960s, the team notably featured at the 1960 and 1962 editions of the Aga Khan Gold Cup in Dacca, East Pakistan, primarily dominated by Makrani Baloch (also known as Sheedi) players. During the period, the team had services of international players such as Ghulam Hussain, Yousuf Sr., Ghulam Abbas Baloch, Yousuf Jr., Amin Baloch, among others. The team also featured in other tournaments in East Pakistan such as the Ronaldshay Shield.

In 1962, the team won the Karachi Football League.

In the 1980s, the team produced international players such as Abdul Samad.

In 2001, the team participated in the Lyari Festival Football Tournament and All-Karachi Jashan-e-Azadi Football Tournament. From 2004 onwards, the team participated in the KASB Karachi League.

In the 2010s, the team participated in several local tournaments in Karachi.

== Rivalries ==
The team shares a rivalry with Karachi based club Keamari Union. In 1956, in a match between the two teams, the pavilion of the KMC Stadium collapsed with close to 100 people getting injured.

== Honours ==
- Quaid-i-Azam Football Tournament
  - Winners: 1961
- Karachi Football League
  - Winners: 1962
