= 1984 National Football Championship (Pakistan) =

Tournament details
- Country: Pakistan
- Venue(s): KMC Stadium, Karachi
- Dates: 26 October 1984 – 24 November 1984
- Teams: 32

Final positions
- Champions: Pakistan Railways
- Runners-up: WAPDA

The 1984 National Football Championship was the 32nd edition of the National Football Championship, Pakistan's premier domestic football competition. Qualifying round was held from 26 October till 2 November, and the final tournament was held at KMC Stadium from 11 November onwards.

== Overview ==
=== Qualifying round ===
The qualifying round of the 1984 National Football Championships was simultaneously held at four centres (Sahiwal, Karachi, Peshawar, Quetta) from 26 Oct to 2 Nov 1984. 32 total teams participated, and were equally divided into four groups. The first two teams from each centre qualified for the final round played on robin-league system at Karachi from 11 November onwards.

At Sahiwal centre, PIA and Pakistan Railways played goalless draw in the final, and PIA won 2–1 on penalties. At Karachi, WAPDA won the final against Karachi Greens by coin toss after a 1–1 draw. At Peshawar centre, Pakistan Army and Malakand Division qualified for the final round while Karachi Blues and Quetta Division qualified from Quetta centre.

=== Final round ===
The final tournament started on 11 November. Pakistan Army and Karachi Blues drew in the opening match by 1–1. Army took the lead in the 9th minute through striker Haider Shah off a pass from left flankman Naveed, and Karachi Blues scored the equaliser 7 minutes before the final whistle through their pivot Karim Bux.

In the second fixture, WAPDA defeated PIA 1–2. WAPDA scored first in the second minute through inside-right Khalid Butt from a cross pass by left-winger Sattar. Four minutes from the half time WAPDA again scored through Sattar from a pass by Khalid Butt. Soon after resumption of second half, PIA reduced through centre-half Sohail.

Pakistan Railways defeated Quetta Division 2–1. Quetta took the lead in the 28th minute through striker Shareef who beat Railways goalkeeper Khaliq. Five minutes before the end of first half, Pakistan Railways drew through striker Nafees. After second half, Railways scored the winner through left-winger Wazir. Pakistan Army defeated WAPDA by a solitary goal scored in the 57th minute through inside-right Siraj, who defeated WAPDA goalkeeper Ather Hussain. In the other match, Malakand Division after taking an early lead went down 1–3 against Karachi Greens. Left-winger Islamuddin, inside-right Ghulam Asghar and right-back Fazal Mohammad scored for Karachi Greens while inside-left Nisar scored for Malakand.

PIA scored their first victory of the championship when they defeated Karachi Blues 1–0, after nine minutes of second half PIA scored the match winner through right-winger Mahmood Anwar. Quetta Division defeated Malakand Division 5–0. All the goals were scored during the last 14 minutes. The match between Karachi Blues and WAPDA ended in a 2–2 draw. In group A, Pakistan Army reached the semi-finals by defeating PIA by a lone goal while in group B, Railways scored a 6–1 win over Malakand Division.

In the first semi-final, Railways defeated Pakistan Army by two extra time goals after playing goalless 90 minute game. Railways forward Nafees scored in 105th minute when he was put through by Arif, and again scored in the last minute of the match. In the second semifinal, WAPDA scored a lone goal win over Quetta Division through left-winger Sattar in the 75th minute.

Railways won the championship by defeating WAPDA by 2–0 in the final. Muhammad Rasheed scored first beating WAPDA goalkeeper Athar Hussain, and the second goal was scored through Nafees. Quetta Division scored a lone goal win over Pakistan Army to finish third.

== Qualifying round ==
A qualifying round (26 October – 2 November) was staged simultaneously at four centres (Sahiwal, Karachi, Peshawar, Quetta) with 32 teams divided into four groups. The top two from each centre reached the Final Round.

=== Sahiwal Centre ===
==== Final ====
PIA	0–0	Pakistan Railways
Penalties
	2–1

=== Karachi Centre ===
==== Final ====
WAPDA	1–1	Karachi Greens

WAPDA won on coin toss

=== Peshawar Centre ===
==== Final ====
Pakistan Army	N/A	Malakand Division

=== Quetta Centre ===
==== Final ====
Karachi Blues	N/A	Quetta Division

== Final round ==
=== Group A ===
Pos	Team	Pld	W	D	L	GF	GA	GD	Pts	Qualification
1	Pakistan Army	3	2	1	0	3	1	+2	5	Qualified for semi-finals
2	WAPDA	3	1	1	1	4	4	0	3	Qualified for semi-finals
3	Karachi Blues	3	0	2	1	3	4	−1	2	
4	PIA	3	1	0	2	2	3	−1	2	

Source: RSSSF
November 1984

Pakistan Army	1–1	Karachi Blues
Haider Shah 9'		Karim Bux 83'

November 1984

WAPDA	2–1	PIA
Butt 2'; Sattar 41'		Sohail 46'

November 1984

Pakistan Army	1–0	WAPDA
Siraj 57'

November 1984

Karachi Greens	3–1	Malakand Division
Islamuddin; Ghulam Asghar; Fazal Mohammad		Nisar

November 1984

PIA	1–0	Karachi Blues
Anwar 54'

November 1984

Karachi Blues	2–2	WAPDA

November 1984

Pakistan Army	1–0	PIA

=== Group B ===
Pos	Team	Pld	W	D	L	GF	GA	GD	Pts	Qualification
1	Quetta Division	3	2	0	1	11	2	+9	4	Qualified for semi-finals
2	Pakistan Railways	3	2	0	1	9	5	+4	4	Qualified for semi-finals
3	Karachi Greens	3	2	0	1	6	7	−1	4	
4	Malakand Division	3	0	0	3	2	14	−12	0	

Source: RSSSF
November 1984

Pakistan Railways	2–1	Quetta Division
Nafees 40'; Wazir		Shareef 28'

November 1984

Karachi Greens	3–1	Malakand Division
Islamuddin; Ghulam Asghar; Fazal Mohammad		Nisar

November 1984

Quetta Division	5–0	Malakand Division

November 1984

Pakistan Railways	6–1	Malakand Division

November 1984

Quetta Division	5–0	Karachi Greens

November 1984

Karachi Greens	3–1	Pakistan Railways

== Knockout stage ==
=== Semi-finals ===
November 1984

Pakistan Army	0–2 (a.e.t.)	Pakistan Railways
		Nafees 105' 120'

November 1984

Quetta Division	0–1	WAPDA
		Sattar 75'

=== Third place match ===
November 1984

Quetta Division	1–0	Pakistan Army

=== Final ===
24 November 1984

WAPDA	0–2	Pakistan Railways
		Rasheed; Nafees
