= Iftikhar Gaga =

Pakistani footballer (died 2013)

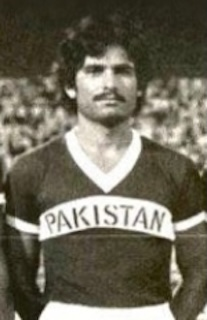
- Iftikhar with Pakistan in 1978

Personal information
- Full name: Iftikhar Siddique
- Date of birth: 1954 or 1955
- Place of birth: Pakistan
- Date of death: 12 March 2013 (aged 58)
- Place of death: Pakistan
- Position: Forward

Senior career*
Years	Team	Apps	(Gls)
??–1977	Pakistan Railways		
1977–??	Pakistan Airlines		

International career
1978	Pakistan		
- * Club domestic league appearances and goals

Iftikhar Siddique (1954 or 1955 – 12 March 2013), commonly known as Iftikhar Gaga, was a Pakistani footballer who played as forward. He played for the Pakistan national team during the 1970s.

== Club career ==
Iftikhar played for Pakistan Railways before joining Pakistan Airlines.

Iftikhar was a part of both the PIA squads which travelled to Bangladesh to participate in the 1977–78 and 1981–82 editions of the Aga Khan Gold Cup. In the 1977–78 edition, he found the back of the net against Bangladesh Army and Abahani, which resulted in a 2–2 draw and a 1–0 victory respectively.

== International career ==
Iftikhar played for the Pakistan national team during the 1970s. He was part of the Pakistan national team for the Saudi Arabia Football Federation International Tournament in 1978.

== Death ==
Iftikhar died of a stroke on 12 March 2013, at the age of 58.
