= Muhammad Rasheed =

Pakistani former footballer and manager

Personal information
- Date of birth: 20 March 1956 (age 70)
- Place of birth: Pakistan
- Position: Right winger

Senior career*
Years	Team	Apps	(Gls)
- Pakistan Railways

International career
1981–??	Pakistan		

Managerial career
- 2007: Pakistan U23
- 2008–2018: Pakistan Railways
- 2018: Pakistan women U17
- 2018–: Muslim Hands
- * Club domestic league appearances and goals

Muhammad Rasheed, alternatively spelled Muhammad Rashid, is a Pakistani former footballer who played as a right winger, and manager. A regular starter during his playing days, Rasheed is among the major players of the Pakistan national football team in the 1980s.

== Club career ==
Rasheed represented departmental side Pakistan Railways at the National Football Championship. He won the 1984 edition with the side, scoring the lone goal for Railways in the final against WAPDA.

== International career ==
Rasheed served as a regular starter at the Pakistan national football team during the 1980s, making his debut at the 1981 King's Cup in Thailand. The next year he played at the 1982 Quaid-e-Azam International Tournament. He also played at the 1984 AFC Asian Cup qualification.

== Coaching career ==
In 2005, Rasheed served as member of the supervision staff for the Pakistan national team.

In 2007, he served as head coach of the Pakistan under-23 team for the 2008 Summer Olympics Asian qualifiers, previously serving as assistant coach under Salman Sharida.

Following the relegation of Pakistan Railways at the top-tier 2007–08 Pakistan Premier League under head coach Chaudhry Muhammad Asghar, Rasheed was appointed as the successor for the post. He retired from the Pakistan Railways department in 2018. The same year he served as head coach of the Pakistan women's national under-17 football team.

He later started coaching the Muslim Hands Street Children Football Team, the football section of Nottingham-based Non-governmental organization Muslim Hands. He also coached the side at the 2023–24 PFF National Challenge Cup.

== Honours ==
=== Pakistan Railways ===
- National Football Championship: 1984
