= Mahmoud Haghighian =

Iranian footballer

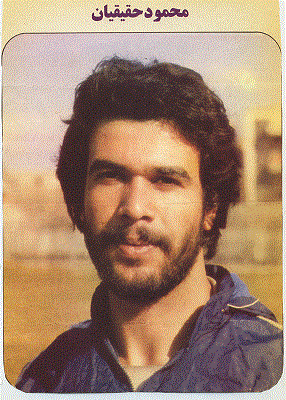

Personal information
- Date of birth: 15 November 1955 (age 70)
- Place of birth: Tehran, Iran
- Height: 1.81 m (5 ft 11 in)
- Position: Midfielder

Youth career
- PAS Tehran

Senior career*
Years	Team	Apps	(Gls)
1977–1979	PAS Tehran		
1980–1984	Shahin Tehran		
1985–1986	Payam Tehran		
1987–1988	Naft Tehran		

International career
1977–1982	Iran	23	(1)
- * Club domestic league appearances and goals

Mahmoud Haghighian (born 15 November 1955) is a former Iranian football player. He has played and coached for Pas Tehran and Shahin Tehran. He also played for the Iran national football team. He played at the 1980 AFC Asian Cup, and captained the national team at the 1982 Quaid-e-Azam International Tournament.

== Club career ==
He started playing for PAS Tehran and later played for Shahin Tehran.

== International career ==
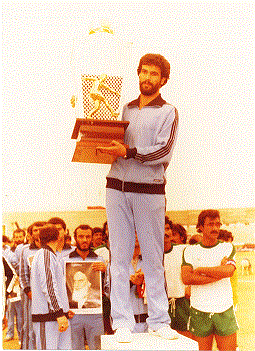
Haghighian with the 1982 Quaid-e-Azam International Tournament trophy

Haghighian played for Iran at youth level and won the Asian Youth Title in 1976 in Thailand. He was selected for the Iran national football team in 1977. He played at the 1980 AFC Asian Cup, and captained the national team at the 1982 Quaid-e-Azam International Tournament.

== Career statistics ==
=== International goals ===
Scores and results list Iran's goal tally first, score column indicates score after each Haghighian goal.

List of international goals scored by Mahmoud Haghighian
No.	Date	Venue	Opponent	Score	Result	Competition
1	21 February 1982	National Stadium, Karachi, Pakistan	Oman	2–0	4–0	1982 Quaid-e-Azam International Tournament
