= Abdul Samad (footballer) =

Pakistani footballer

Personal information
- Full name: Abdul Samad Baloch
- Date of birth: 1964 (age 61–62)
- Place of birth: Karachi, Pakistan
- Position: Midfielder

Senior career*
Years	Team	Apps	(Gls)
- Karachi Port Trust
- Pakistan Steel
- KESC

International career
1986	Pakistan		
- * Club domestic league appearances and goals

Abdul Samad Baloch (Urdu: عبدالصمد بلوچ; born 1964) is a Pakistani former footballer who played as a midfielder. He represented the Pakistan national team at the 1986 Asian Games.

== Early life ==
Samad was born in Lyari as the third eldest of his six brothers.

== Club career ==
Samad started his football career as a right winger with Lucky Star Football Club Lyari. He then played for 17 years with Baloch Eleven, and then joined Baloch Muhammad Lyari in 1995.

He played at the National Football Championship with departmental sides KPT, Pakistan Steel and KESC. On 6 May 1985, he scored the lone goal in the surprise win of Pakistan Steel against the Nepal national team which featured at the 1985 Quaid-e-Azam International Tournament, and played an exhibition match against the club after finalisation of the tournament.

== International career ==
Samad represented the Pakistan national team at the 1986 Asian Games as a regular starter.

== Playing style ==
Samad was praised for his dodges, ball control and timely passes.

== Personal life ==
Samad's younger brothers Ghulam Shabbir and Ghulam Ali, and cousins Ayub Taj, Muhammad Jan and Saeed Taj are also footballers.

In 2016, Samad participated in a football-related protest in Karachi alongside other former Pakistan international players amidst FIFA suspension on the Pakistan Football Federation and domestic football turbulence. In 2017, Samad was among former players associated with Baloch Muhammadan who attended the club’s golden jubilee celebrations.
