= 1963 Aga Khan Gold Cup =

- M.N. Jehan receiving the Aga Khan Gold Cup trophy from Mr. Abdul Hamid Chowdhury

Tournament details
- Host country: East Pakistan (now Bangladesh)
- Dates: 9 – 29 October 1964
- Teams: 15 (from 1 confederation)
- Venue: Dhaka Stadium (in Dhaka host cities)

Final positions
- Champions: Pakistan Western Railway

Tournament statistics
- Matches played: 22
- Goals scored: 94 (4.27 per match)
- Top scorer(s): (Pakistan) Idrees Sr. (Pakistan) Ghulam Abbas Baloch (9 goals)

The 1963 Aga Khan Gold Cup was the sixth edition of the Aga Khan Gold Cup. The tournament was organized by the East Pakistan Sports Federation (EPSF) and all games were held at the Dhaka Stadium in Dacca, East Pakistan (now Bangladesh), from 9 to 29 October 1959. Matches lasted 70 minutes, with 5 minutes recess.

== Venues ==
Dhaka
Dhaka Stadium
Capacity: 25,000
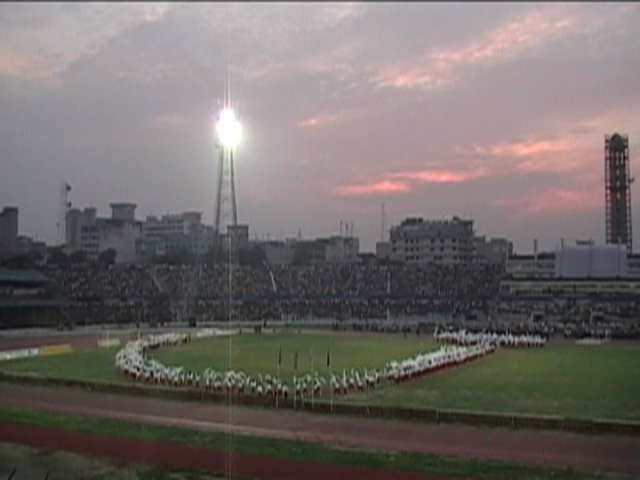

== Qualifying stage ==
=== First phase ===
9 October 1963

| Ispahani Club (Pakistan) | 0–1 | (Pakistan) Baluch FC |
|---|---|---|
| | Report | Azim |

Dhaka Stadium, Dacca
Referee: Khalilur Rahman (Pakistan)

=== Second phase ===
11 October 1963

| Dhaka Wanderers (Pakistan) | 8–0 | Pakistan Eastern Railway |
|---|---|---|
| Umer (?), 39'; Abbas (?), 14' (?), 61'; Yousuf Jr. 58'; Musa | Report |

Dhaka Stadium, Dacca
Referee: Issa Khan (Pakistan)

11 October 1963

| East-West Union FC (Pakistan) | 3–5 | (Pakistan) EP Police |
|---|---|---|
| Sarwaruddin 12', 42'; Mohammad Zaman 55' (pen.) | Report | Nabi 9', 25'; Jamil Akhtar 17', 22'; Bimal Kar 63' |

Dhaka Stadium, Dacca
Referee: Amir Hamza (Pakistan)

12 October 1963

| Azad (Pakistan) | 0–1 | (Pakistan) Warsak |
|---|---|---|
| | Report | Ghafoor 30', 57' |

Dhaka Stadium, Dacca
Referee: Zahurul Alam (Pakistan)

12 October 1963

| Mohammedan (Pakistan) | 4–2 | (Pakistan) Baluch FC |
|---|---|---|
| Ali Mohammad 3' (o.g.); Pratap 34'; Moosa; Kabir | Report | Azim 30', 57' |

Dhaka Stadium, Dacca
Referee: Masudur Rahman (Pakistan)

13 October 1963

| PWD (Pakistan) | 0–3 | (Pakistan) PIA |
|---|---|---|
| | Report | Sayeed 28'; Changeez Khan 38' (?) |

Dhaka Stadium, Dacca
Referee: M.A. Munshi (Pakistan)

14 October 1963

| Pakistan Western Railway | 4–0 | (Pakistan) Wari Club |
|---|---|---|
| Idrees Sr. 7'; Jehan 18', 52', 65' | Report |

Dhaka Stadium, Dacca
Referee: Zahurul Alam (Pakistan)

Byes to the round robin league: Nepal and Indonesia U23.

== Round robin league ==
=== Group A ===
| Pos | Team | Pld | W | D | L | GF | GA | GD | Pts | Qualification |
|---|---|---|---|---|---|---|---|---|---|---|
| 1 | (Pakistan) Dhaka Wanderers | 3 | 3 | 0 | 0 | 16 | 0 | +16 | 6 | Advance to the Semi-finals |
| 2 | Pakistan Western Railway | 3 | 2 | 0 | 1 | 10 | 2 | +8 | 4 | Advance to the Semi-finals |
| 3 | Nepal | 3 | 1 | 0 | 2 | 1 | 15 | −14 | 2 | |
| 4 | (Pakistan) EP Police | 3 | 0 | 0 | 3 | 0 | 10 | −10 | 0 | |

Source: []
16 October 1963

| Dhaka Wanderers (Pakistan) | 7–0 | (Pakistan) EP Police |
|---|---|---|
| Abbas 2' (?); Umer 7' (?); Yousuf Jr. 53'; Ghani 58', 69' | Report |

Dhaka Stadium, Dacca
Referee: M.A. Munshi (Pakistan)

18 October 1963

| Pakistan Western Railway | 8–0 | Nepal |
|---|---|---|
| Idrees Sr. 15', 31', 32', 43', 55', 59'; Jehan 65'; Talib | Report |

Dhaka Stadium, Dacca
Referee: Golam Hossain (Pakistan)

18 October 1963

| Nepal | 0–7 | (Pakistan) Dhaka Wanderers |
|---|---|---|
| | Report | Umer 3', 20' (?); Yousuf Jr. 7'; Abdullah 25'; Abbas 60', 64' |

Dhaka Stadium, Dacca
Referee: M.A. Munshi (Pakistan)

22 October 1963

| Pakistan Western Railway | 0–2 | (Pakistan) Dhaka Wanderers |
|---|---|---|
| | Report | Umer 25' (?) |

Dhaka Stadium, Dacca
Referee: Zahurul Alam (Pakistan)

24 October 1963

| EP Police (Pakistan) | 0–1 | Nepal |
|---|---|---|
| | Report | Prakash Bikram Shah 51' |

Dhaka Stadium, Dacca
Referee: Zahurul Alam (Pakistan)

25 October 1963

| Pakistan Western Railway | 2–0 | (Pakistan) EP Police |
|---|---|---|
| Talib 37'; Idrees Sr. 68' | Report |

Dhaka Stadium, Dacca
Referee: M.A. Munshi (Pakistan)

=== Group B ===
| Pos | Team | Pld | W | D | L | GF | GA | GD | Pts | Qualification |
|---|---|---|---|---|---|---|---|---|---|---|
| 1 | (Pakistan) Mohammedan | 3 | 3 | 0 | 0 | 8 | 2 | +6 | 6 | Advance to the Semi-finals |
| 2 | Indonesia U23 | 3 | 1 | 0 | 2 | 7 | 7 | 0 | 2 | Advance to the Semi-finals |
| 3 | (Pakistan) Warsak | 3 | 1 | 0 | 2 | 5 | 6 | −1 | 2 | |
| 4 | (Pakistan) PIA | 3 | 1 | 0 | 2 | 3 | 8 | −5 | 2 | |

Source: []
15 October 1963

| Mohammedan (Pakistan) | 2–1 | (Pakistan) Warsak |
|---|---|---|
| Moosa 22'; Rahmatullah | Report | Ghafoor |

Dhaka Stadium, Dacca
Referee: M.A. Munshi (Pakistan)

17 October 1963

| PIA (Pakistan) | 0–3 | (Pakistan) Warsak |
|---|---|---|
| | Report | Sarfaz 39', 65' (?) |

Dhaka Stadium, Dacca
Referee: Masudur Rahman (Pakistan)

19 October 1963

| PIA (Pakistan) | 3–2 | Indonesia U23 |
|---|---|---|
| Sayeed 3', 10' (?) | Report | Alvandu 32'; Soemarno 40' |

Dhaka Stadium, Dacca
Referee: Issa Khan (Pakistan)

21 October 1963

| PIA (Pakistan) | 0–3 | (Pakistan) Mohammedan |
|---|---|---|
| | Report | Rahmatullah 12'; Pratap 25'; Moosa 61' |

Dhaka Stadium, Dacca
Referee: Masudur Rahman (Pakistan)

23 October 1963

| Mohammedan (Pakistan) | 3–1 | Indonesia U23 |
|---|---|---|
| Moosa 33'; Qayyum 40'; Bashir 45' | Report | Dominicus 2' |

Dhaka Stadium, Dacca
Referee: Golam Hossain (Pakistan)

25 October 1963

| Warsak (Pakistan) | 1–4 | Indonesia U23 |
|---|---|---|
| Nasarullah 45' | Report | Dominicus 16', 32', 52'; Sujitno 67' |

Dhaka Stadium, Dacca
Referee: Masudur Rahman (Pakistan)

== Knockout stage ==
=== Semi-finals ===
26 October 1963

| Dhaka Wanderers (Pakistan) | 5–0 | Indonesia U23 |
|---|---|---|
| Ghafoor 22'; Yousuf Sr. 45', 48', 57' (?) | Report |

Dhaka Stadium, Dacca
Referee: Zahurul Alam (Pakistan)

27 October 1963

| Pakistan Western Railway | 3–2 | (Pakistan) Mohammedan |
|---|---|---|
| Idrees Sr. 15'; Talib 17'; Ramzan | Report | Rahmatullah; Moosa 45' |

Dhaka Stadium, Dacca
Referee: Masudur Rahman (Pakistan)

== Final ==
=== Match ===
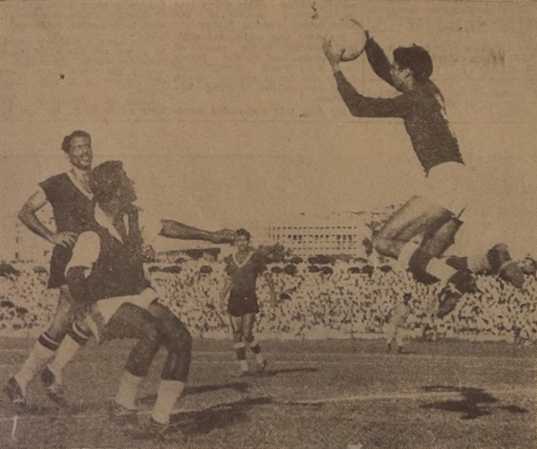
Railway goalkeeper Muhammad Latif catching the ball during the final between Pakistan Western Railway and Dacca Wanderers.

The 1963 Aga Khan Gold Cup final was held at the Dhaka Stadium on 29 October 1963.

The final began in front of 45,000 spectators, an important chance was created in the fourth minute when Yousuf Sr. ran down the left flank and tried a shot, but was turnt down by goalkeeper Muhammad Latif. After several passing combinations taking place between both teams, Muhammad Umer put his side ahead in the 29th minute, where he capitalised on a mistake by defender Alam Butt, which enabled him to striker the ball past Latif, giving the Wanderers a 1–0 lead.

This however did not discourage the Railwaymen, as they found the back of the net through their star player, M.N. Jehan, who also scored on a mistake, this time from Gafur Baloch, who misjudged a pass, which Jehan equalized from.

After the interval, both teams fought harshly, however, it was the Railwaymen who would take the trophy home, as they scored the winning goal through striker, Idrees Sr., who headed the ball in the goal nearing the end of the game.

29 October 1963

| Pakistan Western Railway | 2–1 | (Pakistan) Dhaka Wanderers |
|---|---|---|
| Jehan 35'; Idrees Sr. 60' | Report | Umer 29' |

Dhaka Stadium, Dacca
Attendance: 45,000
Referee: M.A. Munshi (Pakistan)

| Pakistan Western Railway | Dhaka Wanderers |

| GK | Muhammad Latif (GK) |
| RB | Alam Butt (c) |
| LB | Abdul Haq |
| MF | Ramzan |
| MF | Rashid |
| MF | Younus Rana |
| FW | Talib Ali |
| FW | Muhammad Saleem |
| FW | Idrees Sr. | 60' |
| FW | M.N. Jehan | 35' |
| FW | Jawed |
Substitutions:
None

| GK | Ghulam Hussain (GK) |
| DF | Khuda Bakhsh |
| DF | Abdul Gafur Baloch |
| DF | Amin Baloch |
| MF | Murad Bakhsh |
| MF | Abdul Ghafoor |
| FW | Yousuf Jr. |
| FW | Abdullah Rahi |
| FW | Muhammad Umer (c) | 29' |
| FW | Ghulam Abbas Baloch |
| FW | Yousuf Sr. |
Substitutions:
None

== Statistics ==
=== 9 Goals ===
- (Pakistan) Muhammad Idrees Sr.
- (Pakistan) Ghulam Abbas Baloch

=== 5 Goals ===
- (Pakistan) M.N. Jehan
- (Pakistan) Muhammad Umer
- (Pakistan) Yousuf Sr.
