= Chaudhry Muhammad Asghar =

Pakistani footballer (1945–2022)

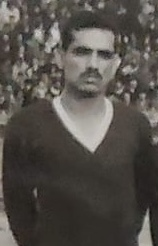
- Asghar in 1970

Personal information
- Date of birth: 1945
- Place of birth: Faisalabad, British India
- Date of death: 28 July 2022 (aged 76–77)
- Place of death: Lahore, Pakistan
- Position: Defender

Senior career*
Years	Team	Apps	(Gls)
1966–1984	Pakistan Railways		

International career
1970	Pakistan	1	(0)

Managerial career
- ??–2008: Pakistan Railways
- 1996: Pakistan U19
- 1998: Pakistan U16
- * Club domestic league appearances and goals

Chaudhry Muhammad Asghar (Urdu: چوہدری محمد اصغر; 1945 – 28 July 2022) was a Pakistani footballer who played as a defender, and manager.

Asghar played for the Pakistan national football team in the 1970, and played for Pakistan Railways for the major part of his domestic career, serving as manager of the team after his retirement as player. He also served as head coach of the Pakistan under-19 national team at the 1996 AFC Youth Championship qualifiers and the Pakistan national under-16 football team at the 1998 AFC U-16 Championship qualification.

== Club career ==
In 1964, Asghar featured in the National Youth Football Championship. He represented National Football Championship side Pakistan Railways for the major part of his ensuing domestic career, helping the side clinch the national title in 1969.

== International career ==
In 1970, Asghar was first selected for the Pakistan national team which competed under the name of Pakistan Football Federation XI at the 1970 Jaam-e-Doosti Cup (Friendship Cup) in Iran. The same year, he again toured Iran during the 1970 RCD Cup under the captainship of Qadir Bakhsh. In the latter tournament, he made an official appearance as substitute in a 0–7 defeat against Iran.

== Post-retirement ==
After his retirement as player, Asghar coached his club Pakistan Railways for several years until being replaced by Muhammad Rasheed in 2008. Afterwards he served as coach at the Model Town Football Academy in Lahore. He later also served as match commissioner of the Pakistan Premier League.

Asghar was also head coach of the Pakistan under-19 national team for the 1996 AFC Youth Championship qualification in Kannur, India. Two years later, he coached Pakistan national under-16 football team at the 1998 AFC U-16 Championship qualification in Hyderabad.

== Honours ==
=== Pakistan Railways ===
- National Football Championship: 1969
