= Talib Ali =

Pakistani footballer (1940–2011)

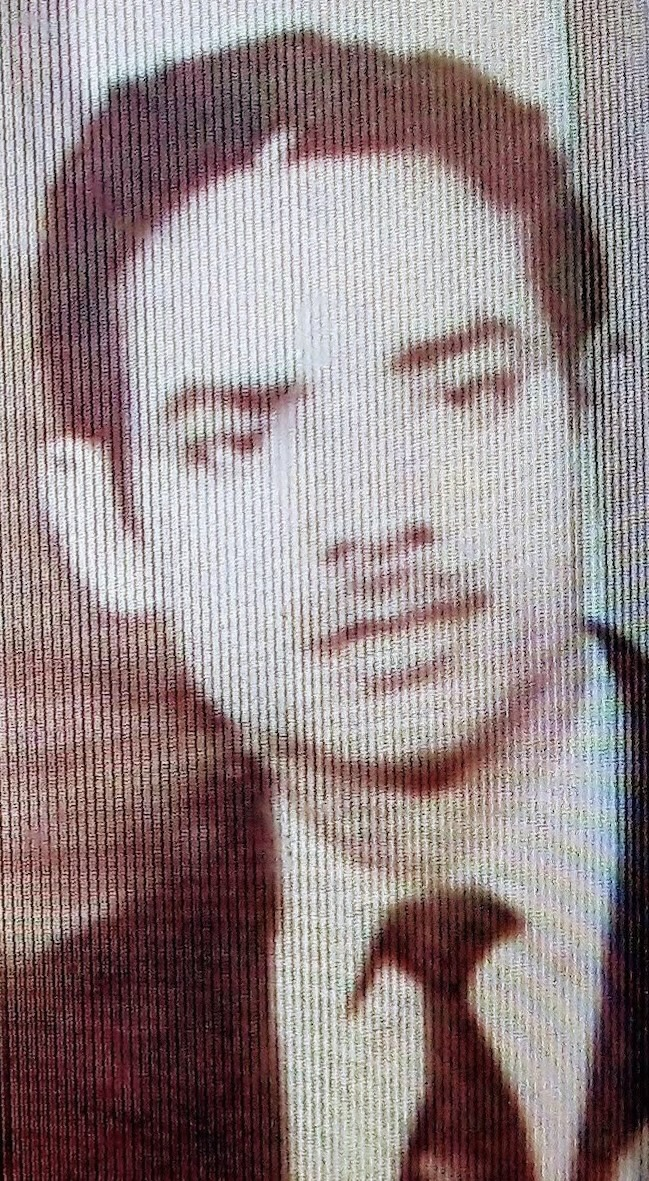

Personal information
- Full name: Talib Ali
- Date of birth: 1940
- Place of birth: Gujranwala, Pakistan
- Date of death: 6 February 2011 (aged 70)
- Place of death: Lahore, Pakistan
- Position: Winger

Senior career*
Years	Team	Apps	(Gls)
??–1957	Sutlej Cotton Mills		
1958–1960	Colony Textile Mills		
1958–1961	Bata Sports		
1962–1963	Rovers		
1961–1971	Pakistan Western Railway		

International career
1953–1958	Pakistan		
- * Club domestic league appearances and goals

Talib Ali (Urdu: طالب علی; 1940 – 6 February 2011) was a Pakistani footballer who played as a winger and represented Pakistan during the 1950s.

== Club career ==
Talib represented the Olympians and Islamia College football team early in his career. He then played for Okara based departmental side Sutlej Cotton Mills till 1957. After 1958, he played for Multan based Colony Textile Mills. At the Lahore District Football League, Talib represented the Bata Sports Club from 1958 to 1961 and the Rovers from 1962 to 1963.

In addition, he played for Pakistan Western Railway from 1961 to 1971. In 1966, Talib was suspended by the "Pakistan Western Railway Sports Board" for two years after taking part in a walk-out during the 1966 National Football Championship final. Fellow players, Alam Butt received the same punishment, while Muhammad Latif was suspended for one year and captain of the team, Younus was suspended for four months.

Talib was also selected to represent the Punjab football team selection at the National Football Championship. Talib was instrumental in Punjab's six National Football titles during the decade.

== International career ==
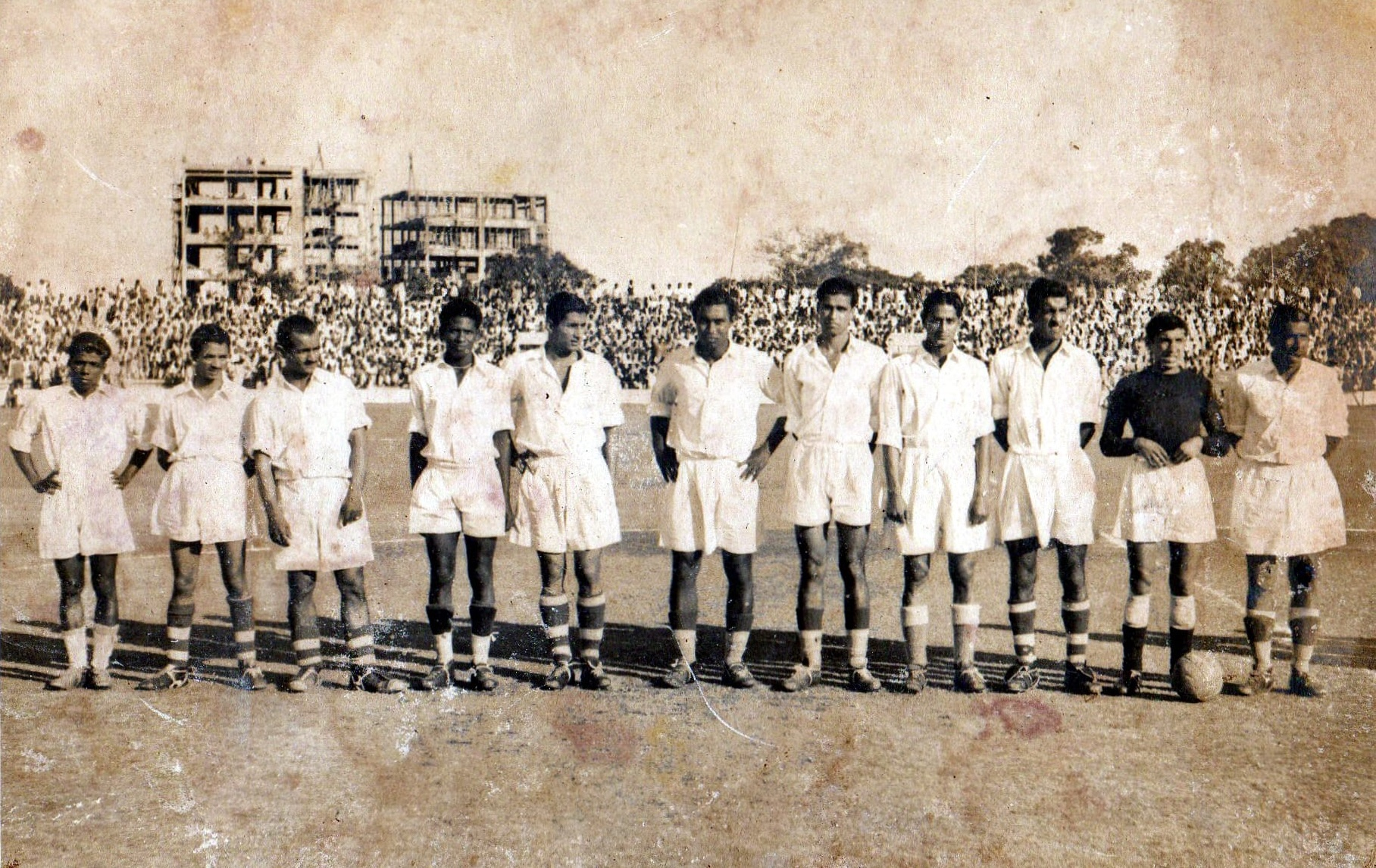
Talib second from left to right with Pakistan in 1955

Talib was first selected by the Pakistan national team for the 1953 Asian Quadrangular Football Tournament. Two years later, amidst the 1955 Asian Quadrangular Tournament in Dhaka, where he was flown from West Pakistan to East to fill a gap for an injured player. In 1956, he toured Ceylon, Singapore, and China with the national team. He scored in an exhibition matches against Sino Malayan XI, and Singapore Selection. He also played for Pakistan in the 1958 Asian Games.

== Post-retirement ==
Talib was appointed as the chief coordinator alongside Muhammad Rasheed and Muhammad Aslam for the Pakistan U20 team, which played in the 2006 AFC Youth Championship qualification in Tajikistan.

== Death ==
Talib died on 6 February 2011 at the age of 70.

== Career statistics ==
=== International goals ===
Scores and results list Pakistan's goal tally first, score column indicates score after each Ali goal.

List of international goals scored by Talib Ali
No.	Date	Venue	Opponent	Score	Result	Competition	Ref.
1	26 August 1956	Government Services Ground, Colombo, Ceylon	Ceylon	3–2	5–3	Friendly	
2	1 September 1956	Government Service Ground, Colombo, Ceylon	Ceylon	1–1	2–2	Friendly	

== Honours ==
=== Punjab ===
- National Football Championship:
  - Winners (6): 1952, 1953, 1954, 1955, 1957, 1958

=== Pakistan Western Railway ===
- National Football Championship:
  - Winners (1): 1969
  - Runners-up (2): 1963, 1965
- Governor's Cup:
  - Winners (1): 1963
- Aga Khan Gold Cup:
  - Winners (1): 1963
