= Yousuf Sr. =

Pakistani footballer (1939 – 2021)

Muhammad Yousuf
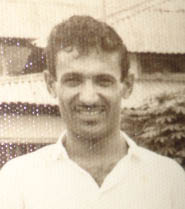

Personal information
- Date of birth: 1939
- Place of birth: Lyari, Karachi, British India
- Date of death: 19 May 2021 (aged 81–82)
- Place of death: Karachi, Pakistan
- Position: Right winger

Senior career*
Years	Team	Apps	(Gls)
1952	Usmania		
1952–1955	Pakistan Tobacco Company		
1956	North-Western Railway		
1957–1960	KMC		
1961	Mohammedan		
1962–1964	Victoria		
1965–1972	Pakistan Airlines		

International career
1959–1964	Pakistan		

Managerial career
- 1972–1977: Sindh
- * Club domestic league appearances and goals

Muhammad Yousuf (1939 – 19 May 2021) commonly known as Yousuf Sr. or Yousuf Senior, was a Pakistani footballer who played as a right winger.

== Early life ==
Yousuf was born in Gul Muhammad Lane, in the Lyari locality of Karachi in 1939. He received his primary education from SM Lyari High School, and started playing football since his childhood. During his student days, he was selected in the school team with which he visited Lahore in 1950 and Quetta in 1951.

== Club career ==
=== Early career ===
Yousuf participated in the Karachi Championship with the Lyari Combined XI, after impressing the selectors, he travelled to India to play at the Rovers Cup with the Karachi–Sind XI in 1952. In the meantime, Yousuf joined his local Karachi club Usmania, which refused to give him playtime due to his young age years back. The same year, he was included in the football team of Pakistan Tobacco Company. At representative level, Yousuf played for Sindh in the National Football Championship from 1953 to 1955.

=== KMC ===
He joined North-Western Railway in 1956, and subsequently played for KMC from 1957 to 1960, while also representing Karachi selection in the National Championship during the same period. In 1958, he travelled to Dacca with Karachi Kickers as guest player to compete in the Aga Khan Gold Cup in Dhaka, which the team eventually won. In 1959, he also toured India with Makran Sports for three months, playing friendly matches in Madras, Bangalore, Hyderabad, and Malabar.

=== Mohammedan ===
Yousuf, (far left), with teammates Rasool Bakhsh and Abdullah Rahi in 1961.

In 1961, Yousuf joined Dhaka First Division Football League side, Mohammedan Sporting, helping them win the league and the Independence Day Football Tournament in his lone season with the club.

=== Victoria ===
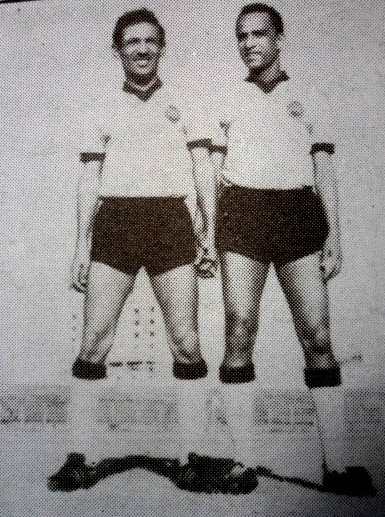
Yousuf (left) with Ghulam Abbas Baloch during the Aga Khan Gold Cup

From 1962 till 1964 Yousuf represented Victoria SC from Dhaka. winning the Dhaka League in 1962 and 1964, alongside with the 1962 Aga Khan Gold Cup. He also represented Dhaka Wanderers Club as a guest player at the 1963 Aga Khan Gold Cup, during which he managed to score four goals against Indonesia XI in the semi-finals.

=== Pakistan Airlines ===
Yousuf then joined Pakistan Airlines in 1965, captaining the side from 1970 till 1972.

== International career ==
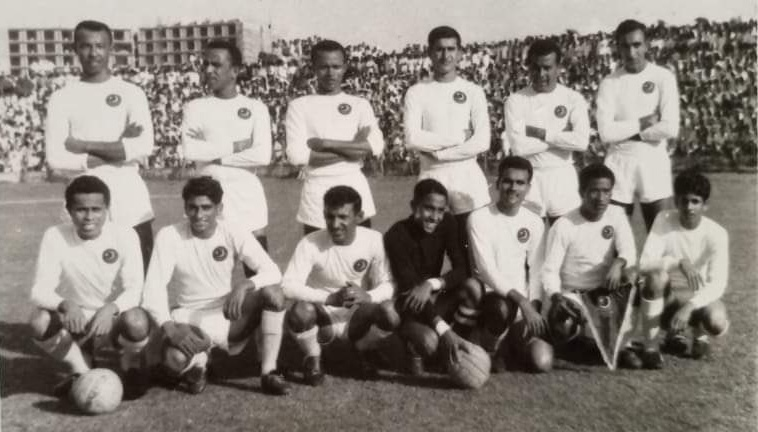
Yousuf sitting third from left with the Pakistan national team in 1964

In 1959, Yousuf was selected to represent Pakistan during a tour Burma. In the same year, he represented the national team in the 1960 AFC Asian Cup qualification in Ernakulam, India. Yousuf was then again selected in 1963, For a friendly series against China. Where he scored a brace in one of the matches, alongside another goal in another.

== Post-playing career ==
After retiring as footballer in 1972, Yousuf was associated with the Sindh team as a coach and selector from 1972 till 1977 and was also a national team selector from 1980 till 1983. He was also member of the coaching staff of Pakistan Airlines in 1981, and of the Pakistan national team in 1983. Yousuf also occasionally supervised several matches along with Ghulam Abbas Baloch.

In 1987, he entered the field of administration and was also the secretary of district football federations. He also served as chairman of the selection committee of the Sindh Sports Board and also a coach. He retired from the Pakistan Airlines department in 1997. In the early 2000s, he also served as chief selector of Sindh province as part of the Pakistan Football Federation selection committee, and later as guest in several football tournaments.

== Career statistics ==
=== International goals ===
Scores and results list Pakistan's goal tally first, score column indicates score after each Yousuf goal.

List of international goals scored by Yousuf Sr.
No.	Date	Venue	Opponent	Score	Result	Competition	Ref.
1	28 April 1959	Aung San Stadium, Rangoon, Burma	Burma	4–0	4–1	Friendly	
2	30 January 1963	Peshawar, Pakistan	China	1–0	3–2	Friendly	
3	30 January 1963	Peshawar, Pakistan	China		3–2	Friendly	
4	3 February 1963	Lahore, Pakistan	China	1–1	1–1	Friendly	

== Honours ==
Victoria SC

- Aga Khan Gold Cup (1): 1962
