= Allah Bakhsh (footballer) =

Pakistani footballer

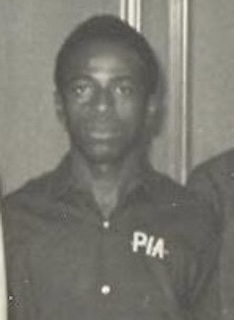
- Bakhsh with Pakistan Airlines in 1971

Personal information
- Date of birth: 1949
- Place of birth: Karachi, Pakistan
- Date of death: Unknown
- Position: Forward

Senior career*
Years	Team	Apps	(Gls)
1964–1969	KMC		
1970–??	Pakistan Airlines		

International career
1970	Pakistan	1	(0)
- * Club domestic league appearances and goals

Allah Bakhsh (Urdu: اللہ بخش), alternatively spelled Allah Bux, was a Pakistani footballer who played as a forward. Bakhsh represented the Pakistan national team in 1969–1970.

== Early life ==
Bakhsh hailed from Karachi. He was nephew of former Pakistan national football team player Abdul Ghafoor.

== Club career ==
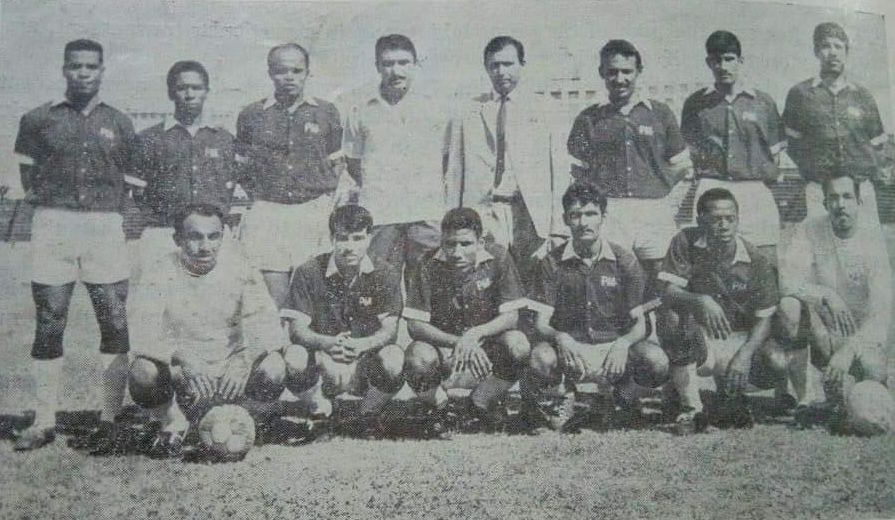
Bakhsh sitting second from right to left with Pakistan Airlines in 1970

Bakhsh started playing for the youth team of Karachi Municipal Corporation between 1964 and 1966. He was then selected for Pakistan Youths in 1967, and played for the Karachi team against Turkey, which was returning home after participating in the 1967 RCD Cup. He also represented Karachi Division in the National Football Championship.

Bakhsh later joined the Pakistan Airlines football team.

Bakhsh was also a part of the Karachi Youth Division team for the 1966 National Youth Football Championship, where they shared the trophy with Dacca Youth Division.

== International career ==
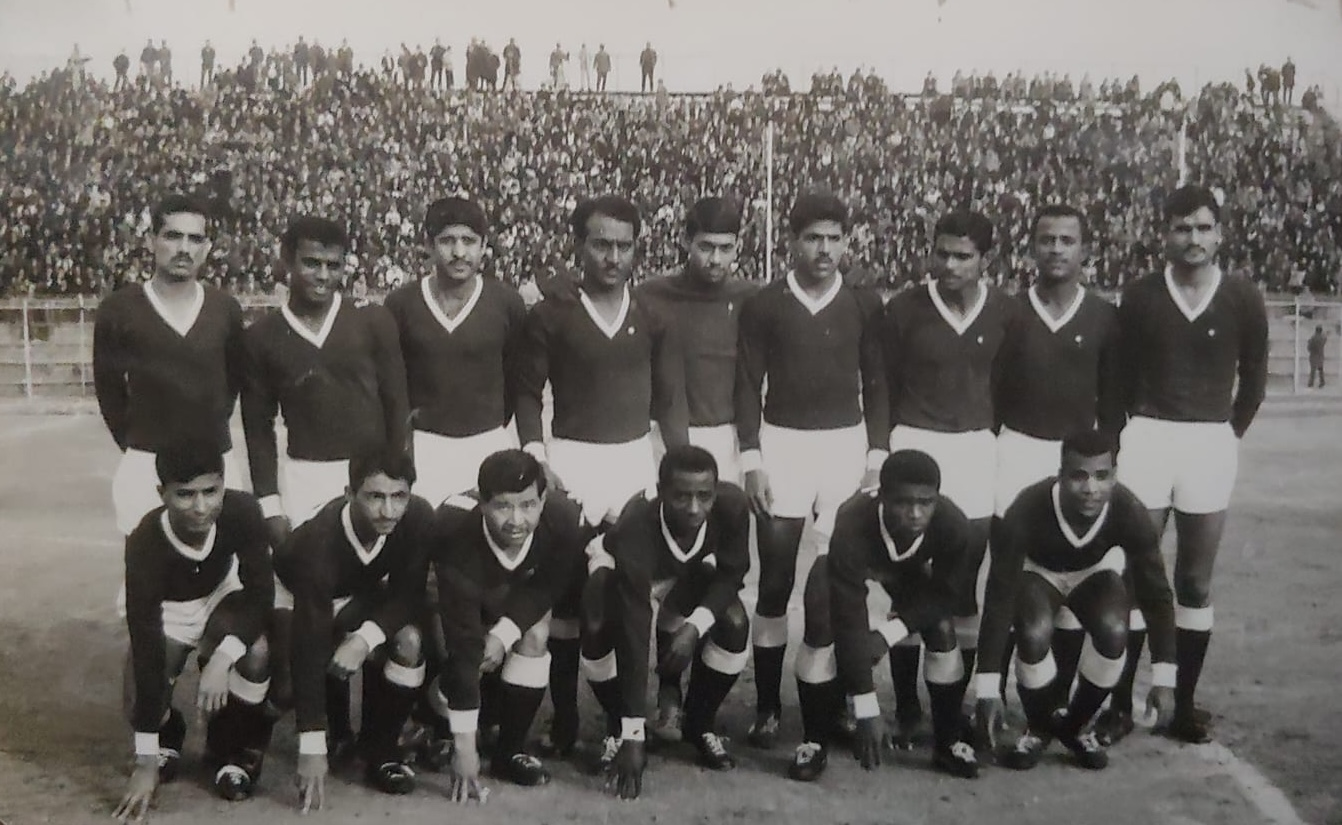
Bakhsh sitting fourth from left to right with the Pakistan team at the 1970 Friendship Cup

After being held as stand bye for the Pakistan national team squad for the 1969 Friendship Cup held in Iran, Bakhsh was selected for the tour to Soviet Union in May 1969, at the age of 20. The next year, he played at the 1970 Friendship Cup in Iran, scoring against Paykan in a 1–3 defeat. The same year he competed at the 1970 RCD Cup, where he played against both Iran and Turkey Amateurs.
