= M.N. Jehan =

Pakistani footballer

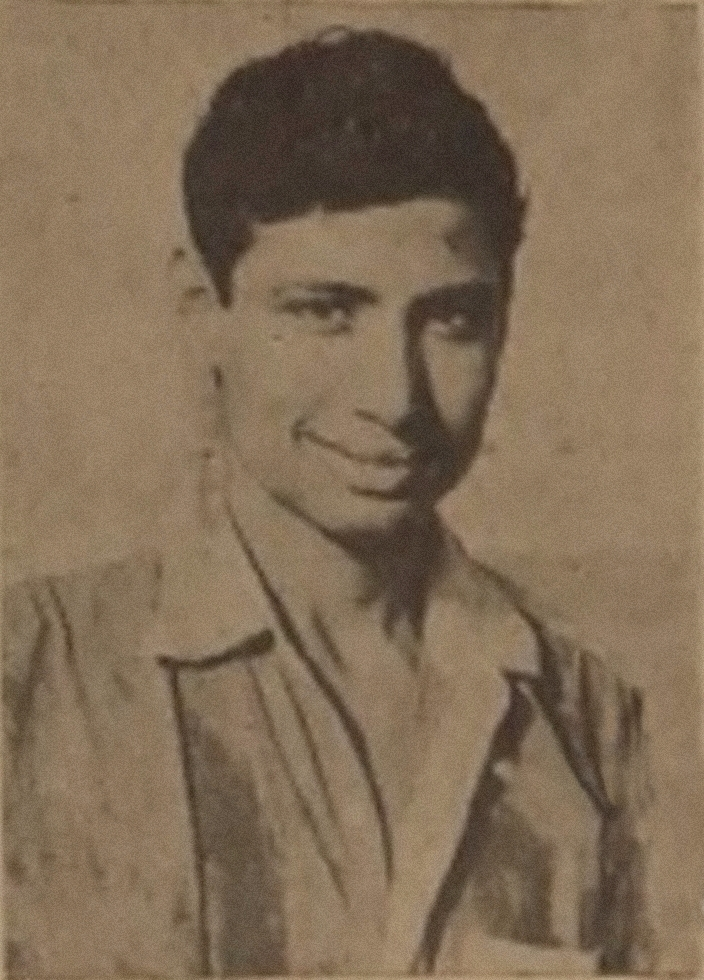
- Jehan during his playing days

Personal information
- Full name: Muhammad Noor Jehan
- Date of birth: 11 April 1940
- Place of birth: Bahawalpur, British India
- Date of death: 8 June 2005 (aged 65)
- Place of death: Lahore, Pakistan
- Position: Forward

Youth career
- 1958–1960: Islamia College

Senior career*
| Years | Team | Apps | (Gls) |
| 1958–1959 | Olympians | | |
| 1960–1961 | Bata Sports | | |
| 1963 | Rovers | | |
| 1961–?? | Pakistan Western Railway | | |

International career
| 1959–1963 | Pakistan | | |
- * Club domestic league appearances and goals

Muhammad Noor Jehan (11 April 1940 – 8 June 2005), commonly known as M.N. Jehan, was a Pakistani footballer who played as an inside left forward. Jehan represented the Pakistan national football team in the 1960s, and was member of the national squad which finished finalists at the 1962 Merdeka Tournament. He also served the Pakistan Football Federation as chief selector in the 1990s.

== Early life ==
Jehan was born on 11 April 1940 in Bahawalpur. He started playing football at the age of 13 in the football team of Bahawalpur High School.

== Club career ==
=== Early career ===
Jehan earned recognition through climbing up the ranks of school football, he represented the educational institution football team of Islamia College early in his career, appearing for them in the "Punjab University Junior Football League", along with the "Punjab University Senior League". Due to his impressive performances with the team, Jehan was elected as the captain of the "Tigers" team, one of the two team formed under the Punjab University to represent the university at the Inter-Varsity Football Championship.

Jehan was selected to be a part of the Bahawalpur football selection at the age of seventeen, which participated in the 1957 National Football Championship.

From 1958 to 1959, Jehan accompanied the Olympians at the Lahore District Football League, along with several district tournaments. He joined Bata Sports the following year. And represented the Rovers in 1963. Notably, Jehan was the league's top goal-scorer in 1958, with 12 goals.

In 1959, Jehan was selected for the Punjab football team for the National Football Championship. Aside from football, Jehan also participated in hockey.

=== Pakistan Western Railway ===
In July 1961, Jehan joined National Football Championship departmental side Pakistan Western Railway, where he was also employed as platform and luggage inspector.

In 1962, Jehan played a key role in helping Pakistan Western Railway reach the semi-finals of the 1962 Aga Khan Gold Cup, but they ultimately lost to Victoria.

Jehan receiving the 1963 Aga Khan Gold Cup trophy.

The following year, Jehan went on to win the 1963 Aga Khan Gold Cup, scoring five goals throughout the tournament. Including a hat-trick in the quarter-finals, and a goal in the final.

== International career ==
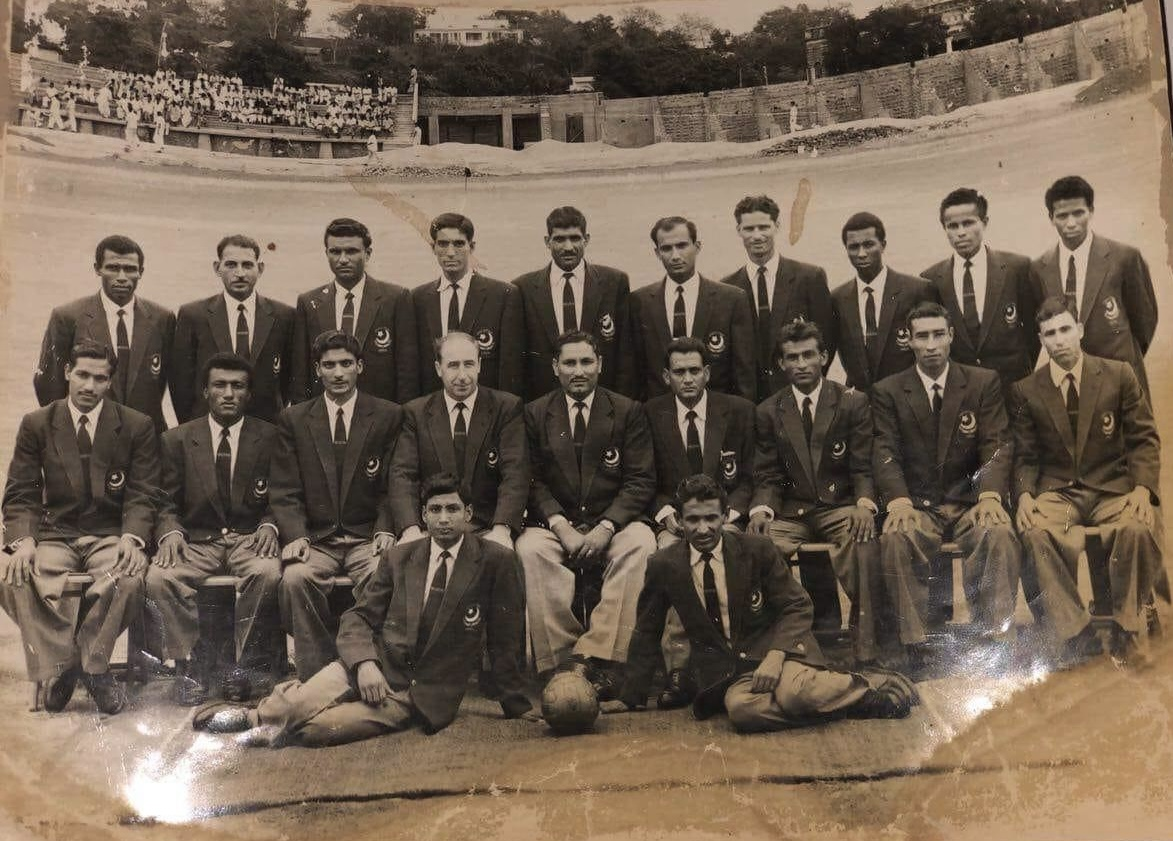
Jehan sitting bottom left with the Pakistan national team squad for the tour to Burma in 1959

In 1959, Jehan was first selected by the Pakistan national team for the tour to Burma, where he scored in a 2–4 loss.

In 1960, Jehan represented Pakistan in the Merdeka Tournament held in Malaya where he scored a goal in a record 7–0 victory over Thailand. The next year, Jehan managed to score in the 26th minute in a 4–0 victory over Burma during one of the test matches in East Pakistan.

On 26 August 1962, he scored all goals in a 4–1 victory during an exhibition game against East Pakistan XI before the next Merdeka Tournament. He was member of the national squad which finished runner-ups at the next 1962 Merdeka Tournament where he scored the lone goal in the first match against Burma in the 44th minute. He also played in the friendly series against China in 1963. He also played against Iran in the Summer Olympics qualifiers.

== Post-retirement ==
Jehan served the Pakistan Football Federation as chief selector in the 1990s during the tenure of former PFF president Mian Muhammad Azhar. Following the appointment of the next president Faisal Saleh Hayat in August 2003, Jehan was replaced by Qayyum Changezi. He also served as football TV commentator and provided live commentary on domestic and foreign matches. Jehan accompanied the national team as a team manager in the 1997 SAFF Gold Cup in Nepal, and as Chief of Mission with the national youth team in the World Youth Qualifying Round in Hyderabad, India in July 1998.

== Personal life ==
Jehan married his wife Tahira on 14 July 1969, in Lahore.

== Death ==
Jehan died on 8 June 2005 in Lahore at the age of 65, due to cancer.

== Career statistics ==
=== International goals ===
Scores and results list Pakistan's goal tally first, score column indicates score after each Jehan goal.

List of international goals scored by M.N. Jehan
| No. | Date | Venue | Opponent | Score | Result | Competition | Ref. |
|---|---|---|---|---|---|---|---|
| 1 | 26 April 1959 | Aung San Stadium, Rangoon, Burma | Burma | 2–0 | 2–4 | Friendly | |
| 2 | 5 August 1960 | Stadium Merdeka, Kuala Lumpur, Malaya | Thailand | 7–0 | 7–0 | 1960 Merdeka Tournament | |
| 3 | 18 January 1961 | Dhaka, East Pakistan | Burma | | 1–3 | Friendly | |
| 4 | 20 January 1961 | Dhaka, East Pakistan | Burma | 1–0 | 4–0 | Friendly | |
| 5 | 8 September 1962 | Stadium Merdeka, Kuala Lumpur, Malaya | Burma | 1–0 | 1–0 | 1962 Merdeka Tournament | |

== Honours ==
=== Pakistan Western Railway ===
- Aga Khan Gold Cup
  - Winners (1): 1963
  - Runners-up: 1962
- Governor's Cup
  - Winners (1): 1963

=== Pakistan ===
- Merdeka Tournament
  - Runners-up: 1962

=== Individual ===
- Lahore District Football League:
  - Top goal-scorer: 1958 (12 goals)
