= Naushad Baloch =

Pakistani footballer

Personal information
- Full name: Muhammad Naushad Baloch
- Date of birth: 1960 (age 65–66)
- Place of birth: Lyari, Karachi, Pakistan
- Position: Forward

Youth career
- Young Hilal FC

Senior career*
Years	Team	Apps	(Gls)
1976–1981	KMC		
1982–1983	Habib Bank		
1984–1998	Pakistan Airlines		

International career
1982	Pakistan	3	(2)
- * Club domestic league appearances and goals

Muhammad Naushad Baloch (Urdu: محمد نوشاد بلوچ), is a Pakistani former footballer who played as a forward. Considered one of the major Pakistani footballers of the 1980s, Naushad played for Pakistan Airlines at club level, later coaching the team. He also represented the Pakistan national football team.

== Early life ==
Naushad was born in the Gul Muhammad Lane area of Lyari, Karachi in 1960. His uncle Akhtar Hussain Baloch was also a footballer who represented Pakistan at international level and later became a member of the Pakistan National Party.

== Club career ==
Naushad started his youth career with local club Young Hilal. In 1976, he was selected for the KMC football team by coach Muhammad Umer. In 1979, Naushad also featured in the National Youth Football Championship. Naushad left KMC in 1981, and moved to National Football Championship side Habib Bank. In 1986, he also represented the President XI team at the 1986 Pakistan President's Gold Cup in Karachi under the coaching of Qadir Bakhsh.

He later represented Pakistan Airlines, where he served as captain from 1987 to 1989 and remained with team till his retirement in 1998.

== International career ==
Baloch was first selected for Pakistan at the 1982 Quaid-e-Azam International Tournament held in Karachi which featured Bangladesh, Iran, Nepal, and Oman national teams, Naushad scored twice for Pakistan against Bangladesh in a 2–1 victory. In 1984, he was last selected for the national squad for the Merdeka Tournament.

== Post-playing career ==
After retiring as player, Naushad served as assistant coach of Pakistan Airlines team.

== Career statistics ==
=== International ===
Appearances and goals by national team and year
National team	Year	Apps	Goals
Pakistan	1982	3	2
Total		3	2

=== International goals ===
Scores and results list Pakistan's goal tally first, score column indicates score after each Naushad goal.

List of international goals scored by Naushad Baloch
No.	Date	Venue	Opponent	Score	Result	Competition	Ref.
1	18 February 1982	National Stadium, Karachi, Pakistan	Bangladesh		2–1	1982 Quaid-e-Azam International Tournament	
2	18 February 1982	National Stadium, Karachi, Pakistan	Bangladesh		2–1	1982 Quaid-e-Azam International Tournament	
