= Nader Faryadshiran =

Iranian football coach

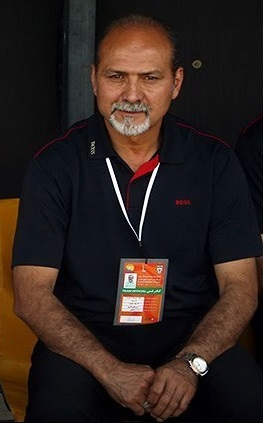

Personal information
- Full name: Nader Faryadshiran
- Date of birth: 15 December 1954 (age 71)
- Place of birth: Ahvaz, Iran
- Position: Goalkeeper

International career
Years	Team	Apps	(Gls)
1980–1982	Iran		

Managerial career
- 1996–2006: Foolad B (assistant)
- 2006–2007: Foolad (assistant)
- 2008–2011: Saipa (assistant)
- 2012–2013: Gahar Zagros (assistant)
- 2013–2014: Saba Qom (assistant)
- 2016–2017: Malavan (assistant)

Nader Faryadshiran (Persian: نادر فریادشیران; born 15 December 1954) is an Iranian former football player and coach. He is a long-time assistant of Mohammad Mayeli Kohan, as they worked together at Foolad, Saipa, Gahar and Malavan.
