= Abbas Kargar =

Iranian footballer

Personal information
- Full name: Abbas Kargar
- Date of birth: March 21, 1956 (age 70)
- Place of birth: Ray, Iran
- Position: Left winger

Senior career*
Years	Team	Apps	(Gls)
1976–1979	Teraktor Sazi		
1979–1988	Persepolis		
1989–1990	Mehr Shemiran		
1991–1992	Poora		

International career
1982	Iran	6	(0)
- * Club domestic league appearances and goals

Abbas Kargar (born 21 March 1956) is an Iranian former footballer who played as a midfielder for Persepolis and the Iran national football team.
