= Saeid Maragehchian =

Iranian footballer

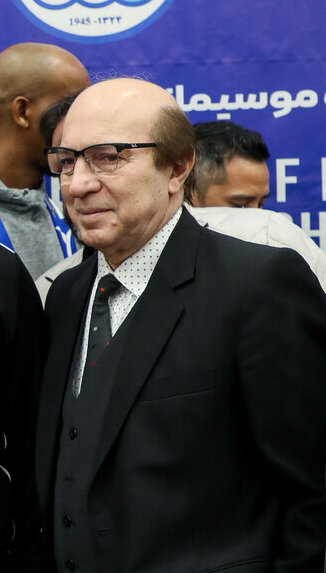
- Maragehchian in 2024

Personal information
- Date of birth: 17 March 1957 (age 69)
- Place of birth: Tehran, Iran
- Position: Midfielder

Senior career*
Years	Team	Apps	(Gls)
- Esteghlal

International career
1982	Iran	2	(0)
- * Club domestic league appearances and goals

Saeid Maragehchian (born 17 March 1957) is an Iranian footballer who played as a midfielder. He took part for Iran in the 1984 Asian Cup, without playing any game.

== Honours ==
- Asian Cup:

Fourth Place : 1984
