= Muhammad Idrees Sr. =

Pakistani former footballer

Muhammad Idrees
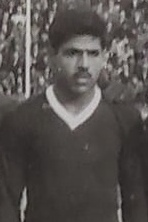
- Idrees in 1970

Personal information
- Full name: Muhammad Idrees Sr.
- Position: Striker

Youth career
- Raiders

Senior career*
Years	Team	Apps	(Gls)
1960s	Pakistan Western Railway		
1960s	Dhaka Mohammedan		

International career
1965–1970	Pakistan		
- * Club domestic league appearances and goals

Muhammad Idrees (Urdu: محمد ادریس) also known as Idrees Sr., was a former footballer, who played as a striker. He played for Pakistan Western Railway and Dhaka Mohammedan on the club level, and also represented the Pakistan national football team in the 1960s.

== Club career ==
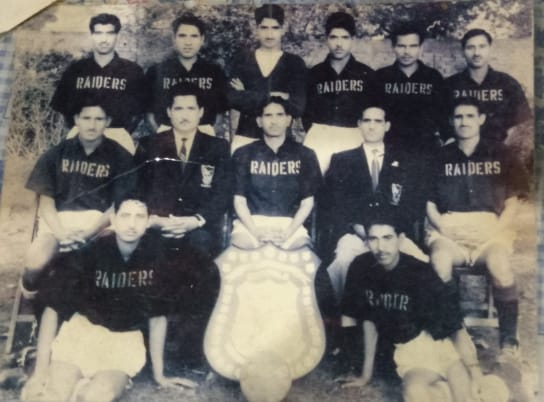
Idrees standing fourth from left with Raiders FC, winners of 1962 Lahore District Football League

Idrees played for Lahore-based Raiders FC, and represented Pakistan Western Railway at the National Football Championship. He won the 1962 Lahore District Football League with Raiders.

Idrees was crucial to Pakistan Western Railway win triumph at the 1963 Aga Khan Gold Cup, being the top goal-scorer of the tournament with 9 goals to his name. He scored a double hat-trick against Nepal, and the winning goal in the final. In the 1964 edition, he found the net twice against PIA in the qualifying stage, helping his team reach the semi-finals of the tournament.

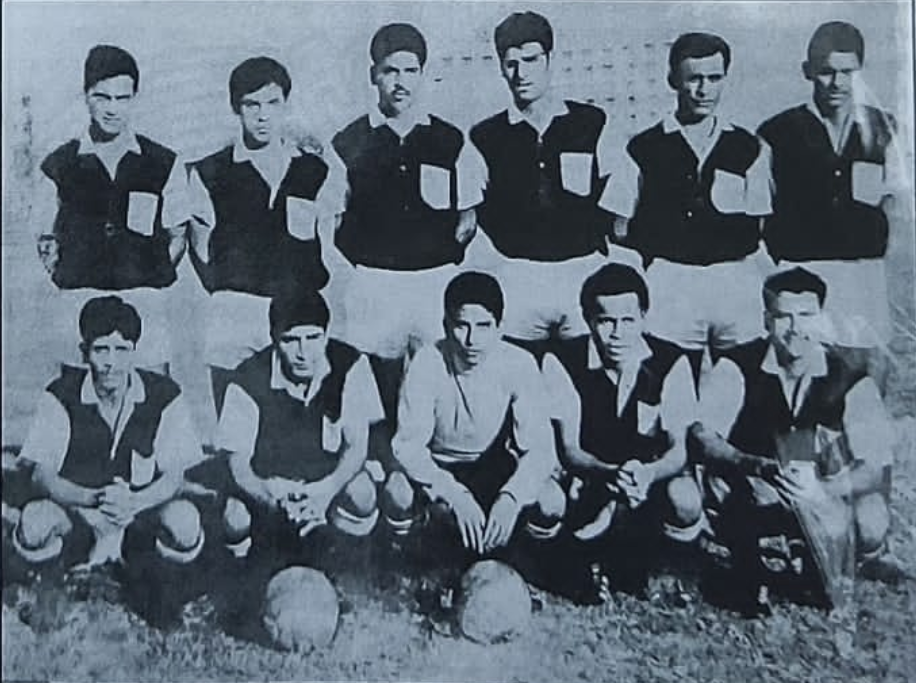
Idrees (third from left, standing row) with the 1969 unbeaten league champions Dhaka Mohammedan

Idrees also played for Dhaka Mohammedan, being a part of the team which won the 1969 Dacca League with an invincible season.

== International career ==
In 1965, Idrees was selected to represent the Pakistan national football team on their tour to Ceylon. Four years later, he was selected for the national team for their tour to the Soviet Union, and for the 1969 and 1970 editions of the Friendship Cup. Idrees also represented the national team at the 1970 RCD Cup.

== Honours ==
=== Pakistan Western Railway ===
- National Football Championship
  - Winners (1): 1969

=== Dhaka Mohammedan ===
- Dhaka First Division Football League:
  - Winners (1): 1969

=== Invitational ===
- Aga Khan Gold Cup
  - Winners (1): 1963
