= Abdul Wahid Sr. =

Pakistani former footballer

- Wahid with Pakistan in 1978

Personal information
- Full name: Abdul Wahid
- Date of birth: Unknown
- Place of birth: Pakistan
- Position: Inside right

Senior career*
Years	Team	Apps	(Gls)
1977–1985	Pakistan Airlines		

International career
1976–1982	Pakistan		(0)
- * Club domestic league appearances and goals

Abdul Wahid (Urdu: عبدالواحد), also known as Abdul Wahid Senior (Note: differentiating him from Abdul Wahid Jr., another player with a similar name who represented Pakistan and PIA in the early 1980s.) and Abdul Wahid Abbo, is a Pakistani former footballer who played as a forward. He also represented the national team in the 1970s and 1980s.

== Club career ==
In 1977, after the appointment of Muhammad Amin as head coach of Pakistan Airlines by Air Marshall Nur Khan, he would bring in new players to form a competitive squad, one of them was Abdul Wahid. He participated in the 1977 Aga Khan Gold Cup.

In 1979, Wahid helped PIA defeat Karachi Port Trust by 2–1 in the All-Pakistan KMC Silver Shield final on 20 November 1979 at the KMC Stadium. He also participated in the 1977–78 and 1981–82, in which he scored in a 2–2 draw against Bangladesh Army in the 1977–78 edition and found the net in a 4–2 victory against Farrer Park United in the 1981–82 edition. Wahid also helped the team win the 1981 National Football Championship and the 1984 Inter-Provincial Championship.

== International career ==
In 1976, Wahid represented the Pakistan Greens at the 1976 Quaid-e-Azam International Tournament. Two years later, he was included in the squad list for the 1978 Saudi Arabia Football Federation International Tournament.

He was also a part of the national team for the 1982 Quaid-e-Azam International Tournament, where he scored a goal in the 26th minute against Shandong XI in a 1–4 loss.

== Honours ==
=== Pakistan Airlines ===
- National Football Championship
  - Champions (1): 1981
- Inter-Provincial Championship
  - Winners (1): 1984
