= Muhammad Ali Shah (footballer) =

Pakistani footballer

Personal information
- Full name: Syed Muhammad Ali Shah
- Date of birth: Unknown
- Place of birth: Quetta, Pakistan
- Position: Striker

Youth career
- 1976: Hazara Club

Senior career*
Years	Team	Apps	(Gls)
1977–1987	Pakistan Police		
1982	→ Pakistan Airlines (loan)		

International career
1981–1982	Pakistan	7	(4)
- * Club domestic league appearances and goals

Muhammad Ali Shah (Urdu: محمد علی شاہ) is a Pakistani former footballer who played as a striker. He is regarded as one of the best forwards to represent the Pakistan during the 1980s.

== Club career ==
In 1972, Shah featured in the National Youth Football Championship.

Shah began playing with Hazara Club Quetta before joining departmental side Pakistan Police. He represented National Football Championship provincial side Balochistan. He played a key role in helping Balochistan secure runners-up position in the 1984 Inter-Provincial Championship held in Quetta. He also represented Pakistan Airlines as a guest player at the 1981–82 Aga Khan Gold Cup, where he scored a goal against Farrer Park United in a 4–2 victory.

== International career ==
Shah made his international debut in 1981 during a tour to Burma, and at the 1981 King's Cup, delivering a impressive performance that included a hat-trick against Malaysia, and a goal against Singapore. The following year, he represented the Pakistan Greens at the 1982 Quaid-e-Azam International Tournament, featuring in three matches.

== Career statistics ==
=== International goals ===
Scores and results list Pakistan's goal tally first, score column indicates score after each Shah goal.

List of international goals scored by Muhammad Ali Shah
No.	Date	Venue	Opponent	Score	Result	Competition	Ref.
1	13 November 1981	National Stadium, Bangkok, Thailand	Malaysia	1–0	3–2	1981 King's Cup	
2	13 November 1981	National Stadium, Bangkok, Thailand	Malaysia	2–1	3–2	1981 King's Cup	
3	13 November 1981	National Stadium, Bangkok, Thailand	Malaysia	3–1	3–2	1981 King's Cup	
4	17 November 1981	National Stadium, Bangkok, Thailand	Singapore	1–0	1–2	1981 King's Cup	

== See also ==
- List of Pakistan national football team hat-tricks
