= Suwardi Arland =

Indonesian footballer and manager (d. 2005)

Personal information
- Date of birth: 1936
- Place of birth: Indonesia
- Date of death: 24 August 2005 (age 65)
- Place of death: Indonesia
- Position: Midfielder

Senior career*
Years	Team	Apps	(Gls)
- PSM Makassar

Managerial career
- 1972–1974: Indonesia
- 1976–1978: Indonesia
- * Club domestic league appearances and goals

Suwardi Arland (died 24 August 2005) was an Indonesian former football manager and footballer.

== Playing career ==
Arland played for Indonesian side PSM Makassar and was regarded as one of the club's most important players.

== Managerial career ==
Arland managed the Indonesia national football team.
