= 1981 King's Cup =

Tournament details
- Host country: Thailand
- Dates: 9–24 November
- Teams: 12

Final positions
- Champions: Thailand (4th title)
- Runners-up: (North Korea) North Korean Army
- Third place: (Poland) Polonia Warszawa
- Fourth place: (China) August 1

Tournament statistics
- Matches played: 35
- Goals scored: 75 (2.14 per match)

The 1981 King's Cup was held from 9 to 24 November 1981 in Thailand.

== Overview ==
Most of the matches were held in the National Stadium in Bangkok, and for the first time in the tournament some of the preliminary matches were held outside the capital, in Chonburi, Lopburi and Kanchanaburi.

Group 1 comprised several national teams, including Thailand which entered with a similar squad in the 1981 Merdeka Tournament, Pakistan which returned to international football after several years of inactivity, Singapore, and Malaysia with a young squad captained by R. Arumugam. China was represented by the August 1 team, while Indonesia was represented by the U-23 side of PSIS Semarang, winners of the 1981 U-23 Perserikatan competition. The match between Malaysia and Semarang was abandoned after 15 minutes due to heavy rain with the score at nil.

Group 2 comprised India, along with the representative sides North Korean Army, Polonia Warszawa, South Korea Army, Wollongong from Australia, and Thailand B.

== Group stage ==
=== Group 1 ===
Team	Pld	W	D	L	GF	GA	GD	Pts
Thailand	5	4	0	1	7	2	+5	8
(China) August 1	5	3	2	0	7	3	+4	8
Singapore	5	2	1	2	5	4	+1	5
Pakistan	5	2	1	2	4	4	0	5
(Indonesia) PSIS Semarang U-23	4	0	1	3	2	8	−6	1
Malaysia	4	0	1	3	2	6	−4	1

Source: RSSSF
9 November 1981

Thailand	2–1	Singapore
Chitavanich 70', 82'	Report	Fandi 40'

National Stadium, Bangkok

9 November 1981

PSIS Semarang U-23 (Indonesia)	0–0	Pakistan

National Stadium, Bangkok

9 November 1981

August 1 (China)	0–0	Malaysia

National Stadium, Bangkok

11 November 1981

Thailand	1–0	Pakistan
Piyapong 52' (pen.)	Report

National Stadium, Bangkok

11 November 1981

Singapore	1–0	Malaysia
Hashim Hosni 11'	Report

Chonburi Stadium, Chonburi

11 November 1981

August 1 (China)	4–2	(Indonesia) PSIS Semarang U-23

National Stadium, Bangkok

13 November 1981

August 1 (China)	1–1	Singapore
Sheng Baihua 49'	Report	Awab 9'

Lopburi Stadium, Lopburi

13 November 1981

Pakistan	3–2	Malaysia
Shah 28', 56', 67'	Report	Napoleon Rozario 38' (pen.); Zainal Abidin 70'

National Stadium, Bangkok

13 November 1981

Thailand	2–0	(Indonesia) PSIS Semarang U-23

National Stadium, Bangkok

15 November 1981

August 1 (China)	1–0	Pakistan

National Stadium, Bangkok

15 November 1981

Singapore	2–0	(Indonesia) PSIS Semarang U-23
Fandi 51', 85'	Report

National Stadium, Bangkok
Attendance: 6,000

15 November 1981

Thailand	2–0	Malaysia

National Stadium, Bangkok

17 November 1981

August 1 (China)	1–0	Thailand

National Stadium, Bangkok

17 November 1981

Pakistan	1–0	Singapore
Shah 9'	Report

National Stadium, Bangkok

17 November 1981

Malaysia	N/A	(Indonesia) PSIS Semarang U-23

Phetchaburi

=== Group 2 ===
Team	Pld	W	D	L	GF	GA	GD	Pts
(North Korea) North Korean Army	5	3	2	0	6	1	+5	8
(Poland) Polonia Warszawa	5	3	1	1	9	5	+4	7
South Korea Army	5	3	0	2	9	5	+4	6
(Australia) Wollongong	5	2	2	1	6	3	+3	6
Thailand B	5	1	0	4	6	12	−6	2
India	5	0	1	4	2	12	−10	1

Source: RSSSF
10 November 1981

Polonia Warszawa (Poland)	1–0	India
Unknown 83' (pen.)	Report

National Stadium, Bangkok

10 November 1981

South Korea Army	1–0	Thailand B
Ha Duk Yoon	Report

Bangkok

10 November 1981

North Korean Army (North Korea)	0–0	(Australia) Wollongong
	Report

Bangkok

12 November 1981

Wollongong (Australia)	4–1	Thailand B
Roy Cotton 23', 35', 44'; John Fleming	Report	Atphorn Pansook 19'

National Stadium, Bangkok

12 November 1981

North Korean Army (North Korea)	1–1	India

National Stadium, Bangkok

12 November 1981

Polonia Warszawa (Poland)	3–1	South Korea Army
Kim Yong Sae 43' (o.g.); Karpinski Adam 68'; Sieradzki Andrzej 77'	Report	Kang Kyung Ho 65'

National Stadium, Bangkok
Attendance: 20,000

14 November 1981

North Korean Army (North Korea)	2–0	South Korea Army
	Report

Bangkok

14 November 1981

Wollongong (Australia)	1–0	India
Unknown	Report

Bangkok

14 November 1981

Polonia Warszawa (Poland)	4–2	Thailand B
Sieradzki Andrzej; Karpinski Adam; Kopec Janusz	Report	Vichit Sachana; Sakaarin Thongmee

Bangkok

16 November 1981

North Korean Army (North Korea)	2–0	Thailand B
	Report

Bangkok

16 November 1981

South Korea Army	6–0	India
	Report

Bangkok

16 November 1981

Polonia Warszawa (Poland)	1–1	(Australia) Wollongong
Sieradzki Andrzej 84'	Report	John Flemming 68'

Bangkok

18 November 1981

Thailand B	3–1	India
	Report

National Stadium, Bangkok

18 November 1981

South Korea Army	1–0	(Australia) Wollongong
Ha Duk Yoon 15'	Report

National Stadium, Bangkok

18 November 1981

North Korean Army (North Korea)	1–0	(Poland) Polonia Warszawa
Li Song Ho	Report

Phetchaburi

== Knockout stage ==
=== Semi-finals ===
==== First legs ====
20 November 1981

North Korean Army (North Korea)	2–0	(China) August 1
Hang Kyung Ho 15'; Hwang Hang Hae 44'	Report

National Stadium, Bangkok

20 November 1981

Thailand	2–0	(Poland) Polonia Warszawa
Chitavanich 5'; Piyapong	Report

National Stadium, Bangkok

==== Second legs ====
22 November 1981

August 1 (China)	0–0	(North Korea) North Korean Army
	Report

National Stadium, Bangkok

22 November 1981

Polonia Warszawa (Poland)	1–0	Thailand
	Report

National Stadium, Bangkok

=== Third place play-off ===
24 November 1981

Polonia Warszawa (Poland)	2–0	(China) August 1
Kopec Janusz	Report

National Stadium, Bangkok

=== Final ===
24 November 1981

Thailand	2–1 (a.e.t.)	(North Korea) North Korean Army
Banharn Somprasong 59' (?)	Report	Oh Yong Nam 6'

National Stadium, Bangkok

== Winner ==
1981 King's Cup champion

Thailand
4th title
