= Amin Baloch =

Pakistani footballer

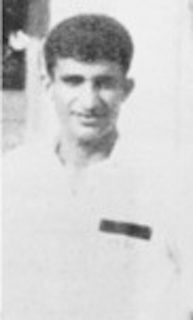

Personal information
- Full name: Muhammad Amin Baloch
- Date of birth: 1943 (age 82–83)
- Place of birth: Karachi, British India
- Position: Defender

Senior career*
Years	Team	Apps	(Gls)
1958	Karachi Kickers		
1959–1966	Dhaka Wanderers		
1966–1971	EPIDC		

International career
1967	Pakistan		

Managerial career
- 1993: Pakistan (assistant)
- * Club domestic league appearances and goals

Amin Baloch (Urdu: امین بلوچ; born 1943), also known as Master Amin, is a Pakistani former footballer who played as a defender, and manager. He is regarded as one of the most prominent Pakistani footballers of the 1960s. He represented the Pakistan national team in matches against Dallas Tornado during their tour in 1967. He also served as assistant coach of the Pakistan national team at the 1993 South Asian Games.

== Early life ==
Amin was born in 1943 in Gul Muhammad Lane, in the Lyari locality of Karachi. He studied until the ninth grade, and began playing football since childhood.

== Club career ==
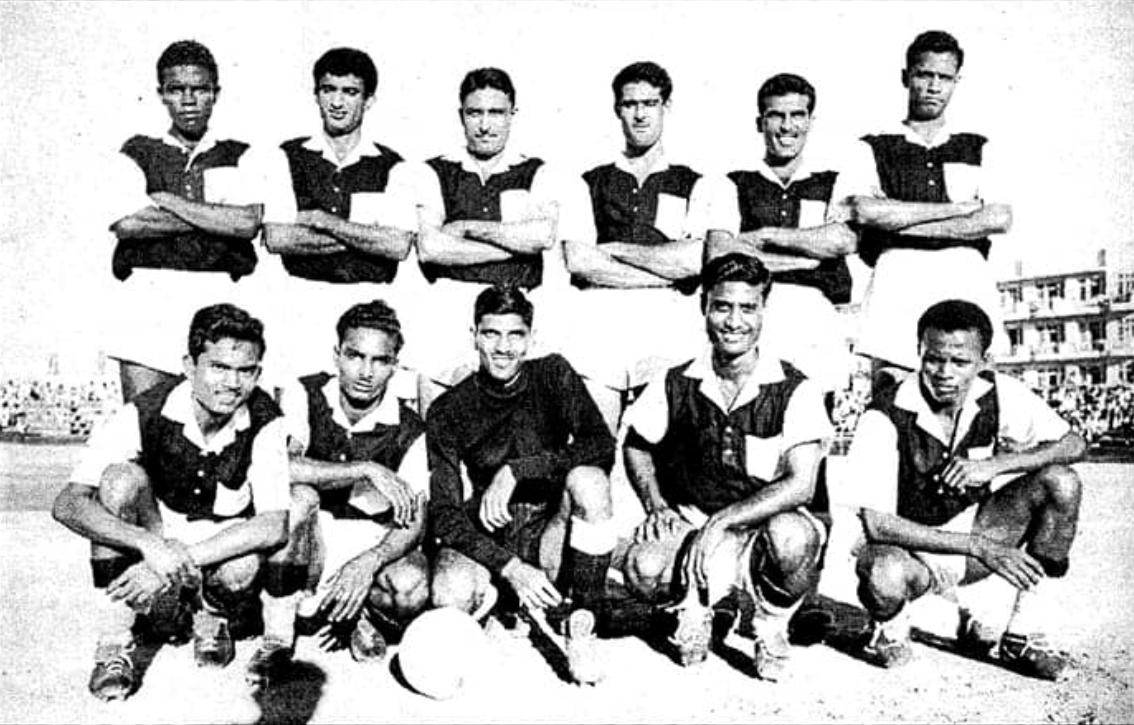
Amin standing second from left with Dhaka Wanderers Club at the Pakistan President's Gold Cup in Karachi in 1961.

Amin started his football career from SM Lyari School and soon got called up by Baloch Eleven football team. Later, he played for departmental side National Motors and in 1958, he played a crucial role helping Karachi Kickers to win the inaugural Aga Khan Gold Cup in Dhaka.

Amin participated in the Dhaka First Division League from 1959 with Dhaka Wanderers, and for EPIDC from 1966 till 1970.

He also played for the Karachi team in an exhibition match against the Pakistan national team in the 1970s.

== International career ==
In 1967, Amin played for the Pakistan national team during one of the matches against Dallas Tornado during their tour, defeating the visitors by 5–2 at the Dhaka Stadium.

== Coaching career ==
After retirement as player, Amin began his career as coach. Under his coaching, MCB defeated nine-time national champions PIA in the final of the All Pakistan Usman Ghani Football Tournament. He served as assistant coach of the Pakistan national team at the 1993 South Asian Games in Dhaka.

== Personal life ==
Amin has four brothers. He is uncle of Pakistani international footballer Ali Nawaz Baloch .
