= 1981–82 Aga Khan Gold Cup =

Tournament details
- Host country: Bangladesh
- Dates: 20 December 1981 – 15 January 1982
- Teams: 16 (from 1 confederation)
- Venue: Dhaka Stadium (in Dhaka host cities)

Final positions
- Champions: (Bangladesh) Brothers Union (Thailand) Bangkok Bank

The 1981–82 Aga Khan Gold Cup was held in Dhaka, Bangladesh, from 20 December 1981 to 15 January 1982. Brothers Union and Bangkok Bank were declared joint winners after the final ended 1–1 after extra time.

== Preliminary round ==
20 December 1981

BWAPDA (Bangladesh)	0–1	(Bangladesh) Dhaka Wanderers
	Report

Dhaka Stadium, Dhaka
21 December 1981

Wari Club (Bangladesh)	1–0	(Bangladesh) Sadharan Bima
	Report

Dhaka Stadium, Dhaka

== Qualifying round ==
22 December 1981

Brothers Union (Bangladesh)	3–2	(Bangladesh) Combined Services XI
	Report

Dhaka Stadium, Dhaka
23 December 1981

BJMC (Bangladesh)	2–2	(Bangladesh) Dhaka Wanderers
	Report
Penalties
	3–0

Dhaka Stadium, Dhaka
24 December 1981

Rahmatganj (Bangladesh)	0–0	Bangladesh Army
	Report
Penalties
	4–2

Dhaka Stadium, Dhaka
25 December 1981

Dhaka Mohammedan (Bangladesh)	4–1	(Bangladesh) Wari Club
	Report

Dhaka Stadium, Dhaka

== Group stage ==
=== Group A ===
Pos	Team	Pld	W	D	L	GF	GA	GD	Pts	Qualification
1	Oman	4	2	2	0	7	3	+4	6	Advance to the semi-finals
2	(Bangladesh) Dhaka Mohammedan	4	2	2	0	8	5	+3	6	Advance to the semi-finals
3	(Bangladesh) BJMC	4	1	2	1	2	2	0	4	
4	Pakistan Airlines	4	1	1	2	4	6	−2	3	
5	(Singapore) Farrer Park United	4	0	1	3	4	9	−5	1	

Source: RSSSF
29 December 1981

Oman	0–0	(Bangladesh) BJMC
	Report

Dhaka Stadium, Dhaka
1 January 1982

Oman	1–0	(Singapore) Farrer Park United
Nasser Hamdan 56'	Report

Dhaka Stadium, Dhaka
2 January 1982

Pakistan Airlines	0–0	(Bangladesh) BJMC
	Report

Dhaka Stadium, Dhaka
4 January 1982

Farrer Park United (Singapore)	2–2	(Bangladesh) Dhaka Mohammedan
Rahman Nongchik	Report	Badal

Dhaka Stadium, Dhaka
5 January 1982

Oman	3–0	Pakistan Airlines
Salem Jumaan 32'; Younis Amaan 67'; Nasser Hamdan 73'	Report

Dhaka Stadium, Dhaka
6 January 1982

BJMC (Bangladesh)	0–2	(Bangladesh) Dhaka Mohammedan
	Report

Dhaka Stadium, Dhaka
7 January 1982

Pakistan Airlines	4–2	(Singapore) Farrer Park United
Idrees 14', 29'; Shah 82'; Wahid Sr. 87'	Report	Nasir Jalil 26'; Jerry Lewis 85'

Dhaka Stadium, Dhaka
Referee: Mohinuddin Chowdhury
9 January 1982

Farrer Park United (Singapore)	0–2	(Bangladesh) BJMC
	Report

Dhaka Stadium, Dhaka
10 January 1982

Pakistan Airlines	0–1	(Bangladesh) Dhaka Mohammedan
	Report	Rama 30' (pen.)

Dhaka Stadium, Dhaka
Referee: H.M. Dhillon
12 January 1982

Oman	3–3	(Bangladesh) Dhaka Mohammedan
Salem Jumaan 14'; Ghulam Khamis; Younis Amaan	Report	Kohinoor 22', 51'; Rama 49' (pen.)

Dhaka Stadium, Dhaka

=== Group B ===
Pos	Team	Pld	W	D	L	GF	GA	GD	Pts	Qualification
1	(Thailand) Bangkok Bank	4	3	1	0	8	2	+6	7	Advance to the semi-finals
2	(Bangladesh) Brothers Union	4	2	1	1	8	5	+3	5	Advance to the semi-finals
3	(Bangladesh) Abahani Krira Chakra	4	2	0	2	8	5	+3	4	
4	(Bangladesh) Rahmatganj	4	1	1	2	2	5	−3	3	
5	(Indonesia) Persipal	4	0	1	3	1	10	−9	1	

Source: RSSSF
28 December 1981

Bangkok Bank (Thailand)	1–0	(Indonesia) Persipal
Boonnum Sukswat	Report

Dhaka Stadium, Dhaka
30 December 1981

Brothers Union (Bangladesh)	1–0	(Bangladesh) Rahmatganj
	Report

Dhaka Stadium, Dhaka
1 January 1982

Abahani Krira Chakra (Bangladesh)	0–2	(Thailand) Bangkok Bank
	Report	Pichai Kongsri 22'; Longkot Phenchapak 41'

Dhaka Stadium, Dhaka
2 January 1982

Rahmatganj (Bangladesh)	1–1	(Indonesia) Persipal
	Report

Dhaka Stadium, Dhaka
3 January 1982

Abahani Krira Chakra (Bangladesh)	3–2	(Bangladesh) Brothers Union
	Report

Dhaka Stadium, Dhaka
4 January 1982

Bangkok Bank (Thailand)	3–0	(Bangladesh) Rahmatganj
	Report

Dhaka Stadium, Dhaka
5 January 1982

Brothers Union (Bangladesh)	3–0	(Indonesia) Persipal
Babul 50', 53', 65'	Report

Dhaka Stadium, Dhaka
7 January 1982

Abahani Krira Chakra (Bangladesh)	0–1	(Bangladesh) Rahmatganj
	Report

Dhaka Stadium, Dhaka
9 January 1982

Abahani Krira Chakra (Bangladesh)	5–0	(Indonesia) Persipal
	Report

Dhaka Stadium, Dhaka
11 January 1982

Brothers Union (Bangladesh)	2–2	(Thailand) Bangkok Bank
	Report

Dhaka Stadium, Dhaka

== Knockout stage ==
=== Semi-finals ===
14 January 1982

Brothers Union (Bangladesh)	3–1 abandoned 88'	Oman
Wasim 65'; Fazlu 78'; Bablu 88'	Report

Dhaka Stadium, Dhaka
14 January 1982

Bangkok Bank (Thailand)	3–1	(Bangladesh) Dhaka Mohammedan
Sripitaya 12'; Boonnum Sukswat 22'; Pichai Kongsri 33'	Report	Somboon Suparrop 60' (o.g.)

Dhaka Stadium, Dhaka

=== Final ===
15 January 1982

Brothers Union (Bangladesh)	1–1 (aet; trophy shared)	(Thailand) Bangkok Bank
	Report

Dhaka Stadium, Dhaka
