= 1969 Dhaka First Division Football League =

Dhaka First Division Football League
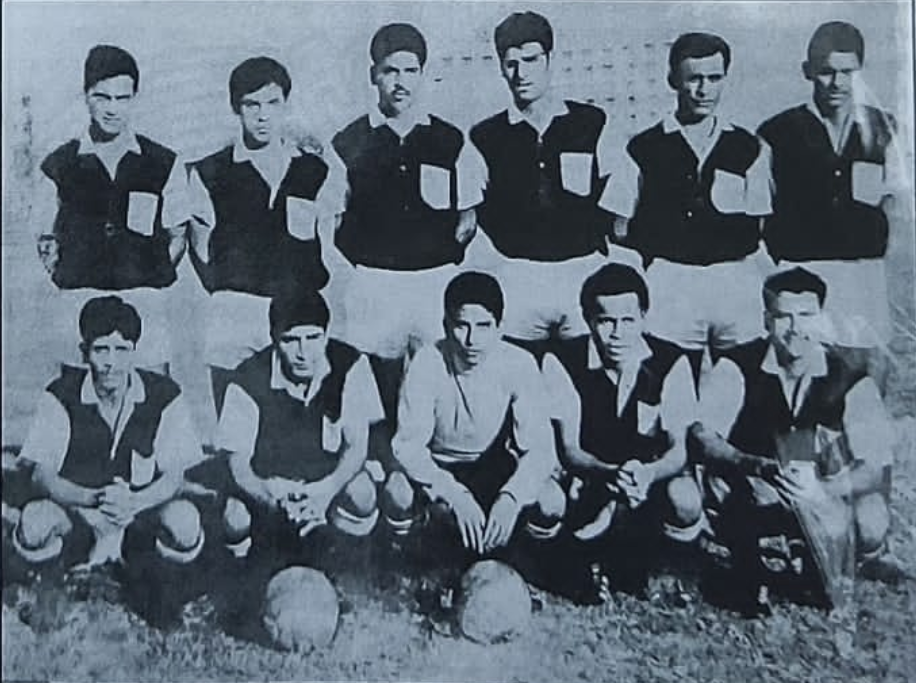
- The Mohammedan Sporting team which finished unbeaten in the league
- Season: 1969
- Dates: 18 May – 23 October
- Champions: Mohammedan Sporting
- Relegated: None
- Matches: 249
- Goals: 978 (3.93 per match)
- Top goalscorer: (Pakistan) Ali Nawaz Baloch (39 goals)
- Highest scoring: Mohammedan Sporting 11–0 Police (7 October 1969)
- Longest winning run: Mohammedan Sporting
- Longest unbeaten run: Mohammedan Sporting

The 1969 Dhaka First Division Football League, was the 22nd edition of the Dhaka First Division Football League following the partition of India. It was played from 18 May 1969 to 23 October 1969, with the venues being the Inner Stadium, Outer Stadium, and the Dacca Stadium. The league was won by Mohammedan Sporting, who achieved an unbeatable season, finishing with 39 points.

== Overview ==
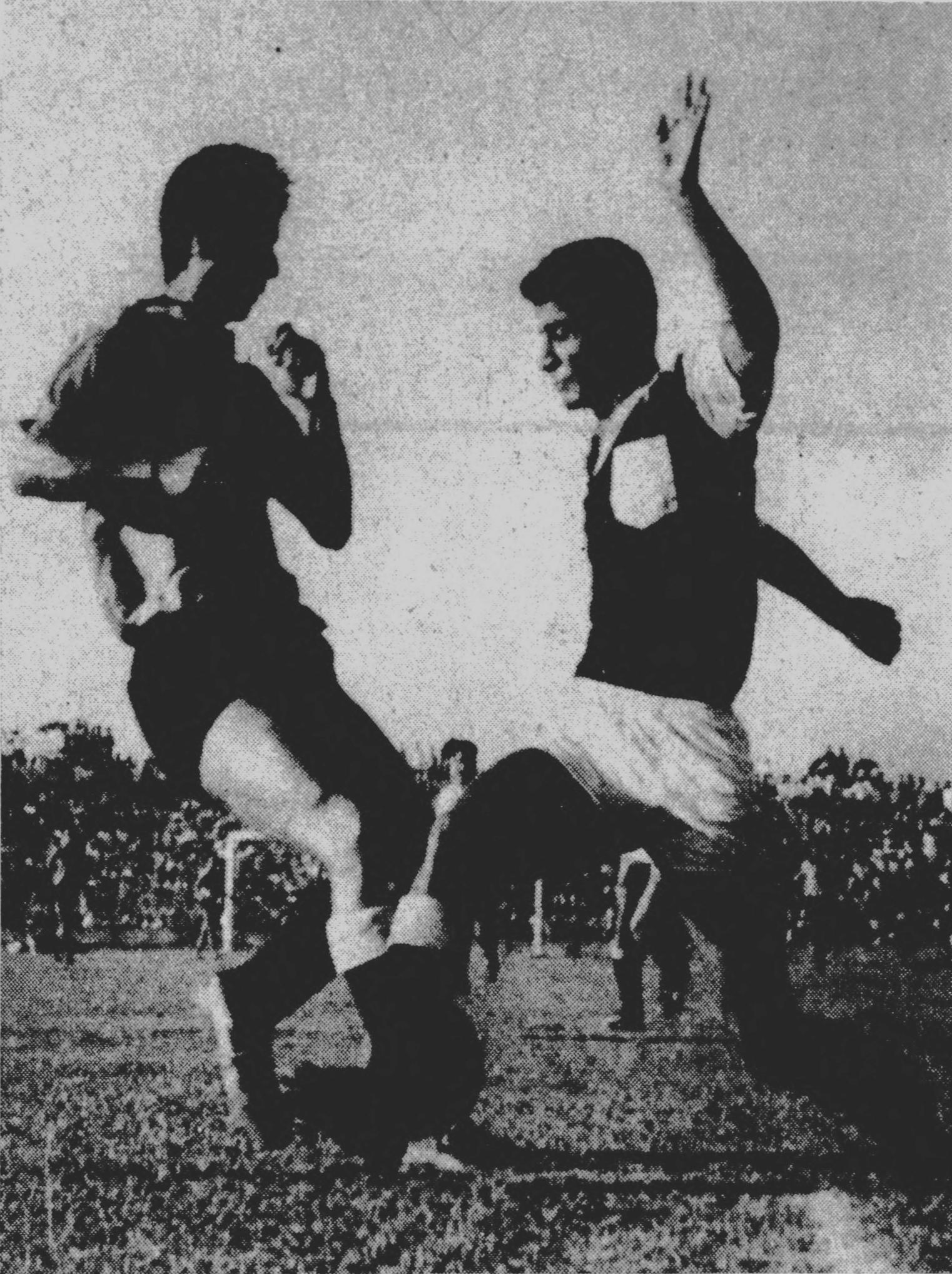
Sadeque (left) and Ali Nawaz Baloch (right), attempt to win the ball against each other during a match between Dilkusha and Mohammedan Sporting in 1969.

The 1969 Dacca Football League, began on 18 May, and ran till 23 October. Victoria announced their withdrawal from the league on 19th May after being forced out of their club tent, a move that was expected to result in relegation. However, they were later granted a pardon and allowed to rejoin the league the following season.

Mohammedan achieved a historic league triumph, winning twenty, drawing once, and finishing with no losses. Ali Nawaz Baloch of Mohammedan finished as the top goal-scorer of the league with 45 goals in 19 appearances to his name. Runners-up Dilkusha, who had notably assembled a side, which included several former Pakistani internationals, such as, Moosa Ghazi, Muhammad Umer, Qadir Bakhsh, Abid Hussain Ghazi, Yousuf Jr., etc. EPIDC, who withdrew after 18 games, finished third place in the league, with the inner-trio of Sardar Aslam, Abdul Jabbar, and Ayub Dar contributing to several of the team's wins. Overall, 12 teams participated in the league, with EGP Press finishing at the last place.

Throughout the league season, several incidents occurred that were criticised by majority of the spectators, critics, and governing sportsmen, the East Pakistan Sports Federation was heavily criticised due to its lack of proper management regarding matches and schedule.

== Final standings ==
Pos	Team	Pld	W	D	L	GF	GA	GD	Pts
1	Mohammedan Sporting (C)	20	19	1	0	107	15	+92	39
2	Dilkusha	21	16	4	1	65	16	+49	36
3	EPIDC	18	16	1	1	66	16	+50	33
4	Wari Club	21	13	3	5	42	34	+8	29
5	Rahmatganj	21	11	0	10	34	30	+4	22
6	Azad Sporting	21	8	4	9	27	37	−10	20
7	East End	21	5	4	12	24	46	−22	14
8	PWD	21	6	2	13	30	54	−24	14
9	Dacca Wanderers	22	7	1	14	36	59	−23	15
10	Police	20	4	2	14	18	68	−50	10
11	Fire Service	21	4	4	13	24	48	−24	12
12	EGP Press	21	2	2	17	17	65	−48	6

(C) Champions

== Matches ==
18 May 1969	Dilkusha	4–1	EGP Press	Dacca, East Pakistan
	Shahjahan 15' ? 18'; Moosa 42'; Umer	Report	Shubash	Stadium: Dacca Stadium; Referee: Zahurul Alam

19 May 1969	Azad Sporting	4–2	Dacca Wanderers	Dacca, East Pakistan
	Dibu 24', 54'; Nazrul 50', 52'; Mantu 56'	Report	Bhutto 39'	Stadium: Dacca Stadium; Referee: Mohammad Ali

20 May 1969	East End	2–1	Fire Service	Dacca, East Pakistan
	Sahabuddin 25', 58'	Report	Nowsher 48'	Stadium: Dacca Stadium; Referee: Mir Kabiruddin

21 May 1969	Rahmatganj	3–0	Police	Dacca, East Pakistan
	Sultan 24'; Hye 59'; Gafur	Report		Stadium: Dacca Stadium; Referee: Rashid Chunna

22 May 1969	PWD	4–2	EGP Press	Dacca, East Pakistan
	Monir 1', 36'; Mahmud 38'	Report	Shawkat 8'; Babul 47'; Jhunu 56'	Stadium: Inner Stadium; Referee: Munir H

23 May 1969	Dilkusha	2–1	East End	Dacca, East Pakistan
	Moosa 14'; Shahjahan 37'	Report	Derick 5'	Stadium: Dacca Stadium; Referee: Mohammad Ah.

24 May 1969	Dacca Wanderers	1–0	Police	Dacca, East Pakistan
	Kader 48'	Report		Stadium: Dacca Stadium; Referee: Moinuddin Chowdhury

25 May 1969	Azad Sporting	3–0	PWD	Dacca, East Pakistan
	Mantu 33'; Gokul 40', 55'	Report		Stadium: Inner Stadium; Referee: Noor Hossain

26 May 1969	Wari Club	1–0	Fire Service	Dacca, East Pakistan
	Nishith	Report		Stadium: Dacca Stadium; Referee: Mir Kabiruddin

27 May 1969	Dilkusha	3–0	PWD	Dacca, East Pakistan
	Moosa 10', 40', 60'	Report		Stadium: Inner Stadium; Referee: Zahurul Alam

27 May 1969	Azad Sporting	2–0	East End	Dacca, East Pakistan
	Batu 34'; Mantu 45'	Report		Stadium: Outer Stadium; Referee: Nazar Mohammed

28 May 1969	Dacca Wanderers	3–1	EGP Press	Dacca, East Pakistan
	Kadir 25'	Report	Babul 2'	Stadium: Dacca Stadium; Referee: Mohammad Ali

29 May 1969	Wari Club	2–1	Azad Sporting	Dacca, East Pakistan
		Report		Stadium: Outer Stadium

29 May 1969	Rahmatganj	3–2	Fire Service	Dacca, East Pakistan
		Report		Stadium: Inner Stadium

30 May 1969	Dilkusha	5–1	Police	Dacca, East Pakistan
	Ghafoor 25', 39'; Moosa 38', 64'; Umer 47'	Report	Sattar 49'	Stadium: Inner Stadium

31 May 1969	PWD	3–2	Dacca Wanderers	Dacca, East Pakistan
	Benu 20', 66'; Jhunu 44'	Report	Kadir 40', 43'	Referee: Rashid Chunna

1 June 1969	Wari Club	4–1	Rahmatganj	Dacca, East Pakistan
	Salahuddin 23', 43'; Aziz 50', 66'	Report	Mala 19'	Referee: Zahurul Alam

2 June 1969	Dilkusha	3–1	Fire Service	Dacca, East Pakistan
	Ghafoor 2', 15'; Umer 49'	Report	Wahab 12'	Stadium: Dacca Stadium; Referee: Munir Hossain

3 June 1969	Wari Club	1–1	Dacca Wanderers	Dacca, East Pakistan
	Jamil 20'	Report	James 25'	Stadium: Inner Stadium; Referee: Issa Khan

3 June 1969	Rahmatganj	4–1	EGP Press	Dacca, East Pakistan
	Gafur 20'; Sultan 28'; Mala 61'; Hye 67'	Report	Kambil 3'	Stadium: Outer Stadium; Referee: Mir Kabiruddin

4 June 1969	PWD	4–0	Police	Dacca, East Pakistan
	Jhunu 2', 41'; Hossain 42'; Mahmud	Report		Stadium: Dacca Stadium; Referee: Mohammad Ali

5 June 1969	Mohammedan Sporting	4–1	Fire Service	Dacca, East Pakistan
	Ashraf 20'; Tipu 52'; Rasool Bakhsh 58', 69'	Report	Wahab 1'	Stadium: Inner Stadium; Referee: Zahurul Alam

6 June 1969	Dilkusha	7–0	Wari Club	Dacca, East Pakistan
	Shahjahan 6', 51'; Umer; Ghafoor 25'; Moosa 55'	Report		Stadium: Inner Stadium; Referee: Mohammad Ali

7 June 1969	EPIDC	3–1	Dacca Wanderers	Dacca, East Pakistan
	Gazi 1' ? Hashem	Report		Stadium: Inner Stadium; Referee: Mir Kabiruddin

8 June 1969	Mohammedan Sporting	2–0	Rahmatganj	Dacca, East Pakistan
	Tipu 8', 50'	Report		Referee: M. Mohammad Ali

9 June 1969	EPIDC	5–1	Police	Dacca, East Pakistan
	Fazlu 17'; Dar 62'; Pratul 55'; Akbar 61'	Report	Salim 27'	Stadium: Dacca Stadium; Referee: Rashid Chunna

9 June 1969	Wari Club	4–2	EGP Press	Dacca, East Pakistan
	Salahuddin 11', 59'; Aziz 13'; Jamil 44'	Report	Tajul 25'; Subhash 63'	Stadium: Outer Stadium; Referee: Munir Hossain

10 June 1969	Dilkusha	4–1	Dacca Wanderers	Dacca, East Pakistan
	Abid 3'; Moosa; Umer	Report	Imam 23'	Stadium: Inner Stadium; Referee: Moinuddin Chowdhury

10 June 1969	Rahmatganj	4–1	PWD	Dacca, East Pakistan
	Hye; Nurullah; Tamiz; Gafur	Report	Mahmud	Stadium: Outer Stadium; Referee: Zahurul Alam

11 June 1969	Mohammedan Sporting	4–2	Azad Sporting	Dacca, East Pakistan
	Abdullah 19', 27'; Tipu 28', 69'	Report	Nazrul; Mantu	Stadium: Inner Stadium; Referee: Nani Bashak

12 June 1969	EPIDC	4–2	PWD	Dacca, East Pakistan
	Jabbar; Nazir 56'; Hashem 60'	Report	Mahmud 30'; Benu	Stadium: Inner Stadium; Referee: Mir Kabiruddin

12 June 1969	Wari Club	2–1	Police	Dacca, East Pakistan
	Alim 18'; Lutfar 24'	Report	Fazlu 43'	Stadium: Outer Stadium; Referee: Nani Bashak

13 June 1969	Mohammedan Sporting	1–1	East End	Dacca, East Pakistan
	Shamsu 34'	Report	Shahabuddin 2'	Referee: Issa Khan

14 June 1969	EGP Press	2–1	Azad Sporting	Dacca, East Pakistan
	Subash 30', 37'	Report	Nazrul 36'	Stadium: Inner Stadium; Referee: Nazir Mohammed

15 June 1969	EPIDC	4–2	Wari Club	Dacca, East Pakistan
	Hashem 15', 20'; Salimullah 16'; Ghazi	Report	Salahuddin 59'; Nishith 61'	Stadium: Inner Stadium; Referee: Mohammad Ali

16 June 1969	East End	1–1	Police	Dacca, East Pakistan
	Jahangir 7'	Report	Fazlu 45'	Stadium: Outer Stadium; Referee: Nani Bashak

16 June 1969	Mohammedan Sporting	4–0	Dacca Wanderers	Dacca, East Pakistan
	Ashraf 35'; Nawaz 38' (?); Tipu 50'	Report		Stadium: Dacca Stadium; Referee: Mir Kabiruddin

17 June 1969	EPIDC	2–0	Rahmatganj	Dacca, East Pakistan
	Aslam 1'; Jabbar 17'	Report		Stadium: Dacca Stadium; Referee: Munir Hossain

18 June 1969	East End	2–1	EGP Press	Dacca, East Pakistan
	Sohrab 40'; Feroj 66'	Report	Enayetur	Stadium: Inner Stadium; Referee: Mir Kabiruddin

19 June 1969	Dilkusha	2–0	Azad Sporting	Dacca, East Pakistan
	Amir Bakhsh 41', 48'	Report		Stadium: Inner Stadium; Referee: Zahurul Alam

20 June 1969	Mohammedan Sporting	11–0	Police	Dacca, East Pakistan
	Nawaz 12', 14', 27' (?); Idrees Sr. 21', 26'; Shamsu 47', 49' (?); Tipu	Report		Stadium: Inner Stadium; Referee: Mohammad Ali

20 June 1969	Wari Club	2–1	PWD	Dacca, East Pakistan
	Nawab 55'; Nishith 69'	Report	Kanu 21'	Stadium: Outer Stadium; Referee: Nani Bashak

21 June 1969	Dacca Wanderers	2–0	Rahmatganj	Dacca, East Pakistan
	Raghunath 45'; Kader 51'	Report		Stadium: Inner Stadium; Referee: Rashid Chunna

22 June 1969	EPIDC	1–1	Dilkusha	Dacca, East Pakistan
	Jabbar 21'	Report	Shahjahan 57'	Stadium: Inner Stadium; Referee: Nani Bashak

24 June 1969	Mohammedan Sporting	6–1	EGP Press	Dacca, East Pakistan
	Tipu 2'; Shamsu 7', 15'; Nawaz 12'; Amir Bakhsh 39'; Pratap	Report	Babul 20'	Stadium: Inner Stadium; Referee: Nani Bashak

24 June 1969	Rahmatganj	1–0	Azad Sporting	Dacca, East Pakistan
	Gafur 50'	Report		Stadium: Outer Stadium; Referee: Mir Kabiruddin

25 June 1969	EPIDC	2–1	Fire Service	Dacca, East Pakistan
	Dar 28'; Aslam 34'	Report	Bimal	Stadium: Inner Stadium; Referee: Munir Hossain

26 June 1969	Mohammedan Sporting	6–0	PWD	Dacca, East Pakistan
	Nawaz 3', 25', 47', 54', 56', 59'	Report		Stadium: Inner Stadium; Referee: Mohammad Ali

27 June 1969	EGP Press	1–1	Police	Dacca, East Pakistan
	Enayetur 49'	Report	Nasir	Referee: Nazar Mohammad

28 June 1969	East End	6–0	Dacca Wanderers	Dacca, East Pakistan
	Sohrab 30'; Feroz 16'; Sayeed 55'	Report		Stadium: Dacca Stadium; Referee: Issa Khan

29 June 1969	Mohammedan Sporting	3–1	EPIDC	Dacca, East Pakistan
17:00	Idrees Sr. 34'; Nawaz 38'; Pratap 45'	Report	Aslam 69'	Stadium: Dacca Stadium; Referee: Mohammad Ali

30 June 1969	Rahmatganj	2–0	East End	Dacca, East Pakistan
	Hye 25'; Sultan	Report		Stadium: Inner Stadium; Referee: Issa Khan

1 July 1969	EGP Press	2–1	Fire Service	Dacca, East Pakistan
	Shaukat ?	Report	Amin	Stadium: Inner Stadium; Referee: Osman Ghani

3 July 1969	Dacca Wanderers	5–1	Fire Service	Dacca, East Pakistan
	Kader 5', 30', 56'; James 40'; Ghani 69'	Report	Jamil 31'	Stadium: Inner Stadium; Referee: Ghulam Hussain

4 July 1969	Mohammedan Sporting	2–0	Dilkusha	Dacca, East Pakistan
4:30	Rasool Bakhsh; Tipu 34'	Report		Stadium: Dacca Stadium; Referee: Zahurul Alam

5 July 1969	EPIDC	2–1	Azad Sporting	Dacca, East Pakistan
	Jabbar 10', 40'	Report	Dilip Barua 55'	Stadium: Dacca Stadium; Referee: Moinuddin Chowdhury

6 July 1969	Wari Club	2–0	East End	Dacca, East Pakistan
	Salahuddin 14'; Jamil 69'	Report		Stadium: Inner Stadium; Referee: Mir Kabiruddin

7 July 1969	Dilkusha	2–1	Rahmatganj	Dacca, East Pakistan
	Moosa 6'; Alamgir 42'	Report	Sultan	Stadium: Inner Stadium; Referee: Munir Hossain

8 July 1969	EPIDC	9–0	EGP Press	Dacca, East Pakistan
	Jabbar 15' (?), 66'; Lalu ?, ? Hashem 34'; Salimullah	Report		Stadium: Inner Stadium; Referee: Nazar Mohammad

9 July 1969	Mohammedan Sporting	3–0	Wari Club	Dacca, East Pakistan
	Tipu 15', 23'; Abdullah 69'	Report		Stadium: Inner Stadium; Referee: Mir Kabiruddin

10 July 1969	EPIDC	7–0	East End	Dacca, East Pakistan
	Hashem 13'; Lalu 14'; Salimullah 19'; Jabbar 25', 49', 69'	Report		Referee: Munir Hossain

11 July 1969	Rahmatganj	3–0	EGP Press	Dacca, East Pakistan
	Sultan 41'; Hye 45'; Nasim 60'	Report		Referee: Mohammad Ali

12 July 1969	Mohammedan Sporting	4–0	Fire Service	Dacca, East Pakistan
	Ashraf 15' (?); Nawaz 17', 32'	Report		Stadium: Inner Stadium; Referee: Zahurul Alam

13 July 1969	EPIDC	3–0	Azad Sporting	Dacca, East Pakistan
	Akbar; Jabbar 61', 67'	Report		Referee: Moinuddin Chowdhury

14 July 1969	Dacca Wanderers	6–2	Police	Dacca, East Pakistan
	James 14' (?); Kader 15', 19', 44'; Kazi 69'	Report	Tipu 20'; Sattar 49'	Stadium: Inner Stadium; Referee: Munir Hossain

15 July 1969	Wari Club	2–0	PWD	Dacca, East Pakistan
	Jamil 39'; Salahuddin 16'	Report		Stadium: Inner Stadium; Referee: M. Khan

East End vs EGP Press match sources are yet to be found

17 July 1969	Rahmatganj	2–1	Fire Service	Dacca, East Pakistan
	Nurullah 21'; Sultan 36'	Report	Aman 60'	Stadium: Inner Stadium; Referee: Issa Khan

18 July 1969	EPIDC	10–0	Police	Dacca, East Pakistan
	Aslam; Jabbar 10', 25', 32', ?, ? Gazi	Report		Stadium: Inner Stadium; Referee: Noor Hossain

19 July 1969	Dilkusha	2–2	PWD	Dacca, East Pakistan
	Shahjahan 40' (~45)	Report	M. Hossain 13', 17'	Stadium: Dacca Stadium; Referee: Munir Hossain

21 July 1969	Azad Sporting	1–0	EGP Press	Dacca, East Pakistan
	Sunil	Report		Stadium: Inner Stadium; Referee: Nazar Mohammad

22 July 1969	EPIDC	Abandoned (3–0)	East End	Dacca, East Pakistan
	Dar 1'; Jabbar 20'; Aslam 30'	Report		Referee: Mohammad Ali

23 July 1969	Dilkusha	2–1	EGP Press	Dacca, East Pakistan
	Salahuddin 43'; Qadir 61'	Report	Shubash 21'	Stadium: Dacca Stadium; Referee: Zahurul Alam

23 July 1969	Azad Sporting	2–0	PWD	Dacca, East Pakistan
	Bilal 12', 57'	Report		Stadium: Outer Stadium; Referee: Mir Kabiruddin

24 July 1969	Fire Service	3–1	Dacca Wanderers	Dacca, East Pakistan
	Amin 48', 55'; Sharifuzzaman 67'	Report	James 69'	Stadium: Inner Stadium; Referee: Moinuddin Chowdhury

25 July 1969	EPIDC	2–0	Rahmatganj	Dacca, East Pakistan
	Jabbar 23'; Hashem 61'	Report		Stadium: Dacca Stadium; Referee: Issa Khan

25 July 1969	Police	2–0	East End	Dacca, East Pakistan
	Nuru 50'; Sattar 60'	Report		Stadium: Outer Stadium; Referee: Nazar Mohammad

26 July 1969	Dilkusha	6–0	Azad Sporting	Dacca, East Pakistan
	Yousuf Jr. 4'; Alamgir; Shahjahan; Abid 58'	Report		Stadium: Inner Stadium; Referee: Jamil Ahmed

26 July 1969	PWD	2–0	EGP Press	Dacca, East Pakistan
	Hossain 15'; Kanu	Report		Stadium: Outer Stadium; Referee: Rashid Chunna

27 July 1969	Mohammedan Sporting	3–1	Dacca Wanderers	Dacca, East Pakistan
	Nawaz 10', 26'; Tipu 52'	Report	Pintoo 69'	Stadium: Dacca Stadium; Referee: Rashid Chunna

27 July 1969	Fire Service	3–1	Wari Club	Dacca, East Pakistan
	Nowsher 44', 60', 70'	Report	Jamil 56'	Stadium: Outer Stadium; Referee: Moinuddin Chowdhury

28 July 1969	Rahmatganj	2–0	East End	Dacca, East Pakistan
	Nurullah 5'; Hye 24'	Report		Stadium: Inner Stadium; Referee: Munir Hossain

29 July 1969	Dilkusha	0–0	Wari Club	Dacca, East Pakistan
		Report		Stadium: Inner Stadium; Referee: Munir Hossain

29 July 1969	Police	1–0	EGP Press	Dacca, East Pakistan
	Fazlu 67'	Report		Stadium: Outer Stadium; Referee: Rashid Chunna

30 July 1969	Azad Sporting	2–1	Dacca Wanderers	Dacca, East Pakistan
	Kader 34'; Montu 61'	Report	Sunil 58'	Referee: Mir Kabiruddin

31 July 1969	Mohammedan Sporting	7–2	PWD	Dacca, East Pakistan
	Tipu 17', 32'; Ashraf 19'; Nawaz; Idrees Sr., 66'	Report	Abul 30'; Kanu (pen.)	Stadium: Inner Stadium; Referee: Mir Kabiruddin

1 August 1969	EPIDC	4–3	Fire Service	Dacca, East Pakistan
	Habib 11'; Jabbar 15', 59'; Akbar	Report	Sharifuzzaman 34'; Nabi Bakhsh 53'; Amin 69'	Stadium: Dacca Stadium; Referee: Moinuddin Chowdhury

1 August 1969	Police	2–1	Rahmatganj	Dacca, East Pakistan
	Nasir 6', 48'	Report	Nurullah 57'	Stadium: Outer Stadium; Referee: Zahurul Alam

4 August 1969	Azad Sporting	2–1	Police	Dacca, East Pakistan
	Mantu 30'; Sunil 65'	Report	Fazlu 49'	Stadium: Outer Stadium; Referee: Dalil Khan

4 August 1969	East End	1–1	Fire Service	Dacca, East Pakistan
	Sohrab 12'	Report	Nowsher 48'	Stadium: Inner Stadium; Referee: Issa Khan

5 August 1969	EPIDC	2–1	Dacca Wanderers	Dacca, East Pakistan
	Bhutto 61' (o.g.); Akbar 69'	Report		Stadium: Inner Stadium; Referee: Mir Kabiruddin

6 August 1969	Mohammedan Sporting	9–0	EGP Press	Dacca, East Pakistan
	Nawaz 21'; Tipu; Amir Bakhsh; Rasool Bakhsh; Ashraf; Pratap; Abdullah	Report		Stadium: Inner Stadium; Referee: Mohammad Ali

7 August 1969	Wari Club	2–0	Rahmatganj	Dacca, East Pakistan
	Alim 5', 15'	Report		Stadium: Inner Stadium; Referee: Mir Kabiruddin

7 August 1969	Police	3–0	PWD	Dacca, East Pakistan
	Fazlu 15', Tipu 40'	Report		Stadium: Outer Stadium; Referee: Noor Hossain

The league was temporarily stopped due to the Dacca Stadium being the venue for the 1969 Independence Day Football Tournament. It was resumed on 19 August.

19 August 1969	Azad Sporting	1–1	Fire Service	Dacca, East Pakistan
	Bilal 27'	Report	Jahangir 8'	Stadium: Inner Stadium; Referee: Munir Hossain

20 August 1969	Wari Club	2–0	Police	Dacca, East Pakistan
	Aziz 25', 57'	Report		Stadium: Dacca Stadium; Referee: Moinuddin Chowdhury

22 August 1969	Rahmatganj	2–1	Dacca Wanderers	Dacca, East Pakistan
	Sultan 13'; Ghafur 34'	Report	Kader	Stadium: Dacca Stadium; Referee: Mohammad Ali

23 August 1969	East End	3–0	EGP Press	Dacca, East Pakistan
	Amalesh 13'; Jahangir 60', 67'	Report		Stadium: Dacca Stadium; Referee: Noor Hossain

The match between Dilkusha and Fire Service, which was to be held on 24 August, was postponed due to two of Dilkusha's players attending a coaching camp. League matches from August 26 till September 6 were also suspended due to the celebration of Pakistan Defence Day.

24 August 1969	Azad Sporting	0–0	East End	Dacca, East Pakistan
		Report		Stadium: Dacca Stadium; Referee: Moinuddin Chowdhury

7 September 1969	Wari Club	2–0	EGP Press	Dacca, East Pakistan
	Salahuddin 8', 30'	Report		Stadium: Dacca Stadium; Referee: Zahurul Alam

The match between Dilkusha and Dacca Wanderers, which was to be held on 8 September, was postponed by the East Pakistan Sports Federation.

9 September 1969	East End	4–2	PWD	Dacca, East Pakistan
	Feroj 17', 58'; Salim 42'	Report	Benu; Derick 48'; Jahangir 69'	Stadium: Inner Stadium; Referee: Rashid Chunna

10 September 1969	Wari Club	9–1	Dacca Wanderers	Dacca, East Pakistan
	Lutfal 5'; Jamil 8', 28'; Jahur 33', 57', 59', 61'; Salahuddin 36', 63'	Report	Kazi	Stadium: Inner Stadium; Referee: Mohammad Ali

15 September 1969	Wari Club	2–1	East End	Dacca, East Pakistan
	Lutfar 50'; Jainul 65'	Report	Jahangir 32'	Stadium: Inner Stadium; Referee: Ziauddin

Matches were suspended due to the 1969 RCD Cup and several other tournaments taking place, the matches were then resumed on 3 October.

3 October 1969	Dilkusha	9–0	Fire Service	Dacca, East Pakistan
	Umer 19'; Moosa 27', 30', Kashem; Shahjahan	Report		Stadium: Inner Stadium; Referee: Moinuddin Chowdhury

4 October 1969	Rahmatganj	3–0	PWD	Dacca, East Pakistan
	Sultan 2'; Gafur 14'; Mala 64'	Report		Stadium: Inner Stadium; Referee: Zahurul Alam

5 October 1969	Mohammedan Sporting	9–1	Police	Dacca, East Pakistan
	Nawaz 9', 22', 50', 69'; Idress 46'; Pratap 55'; Amir Bakhsh 61', 62'	Report	Fazlu 59'	Referee: Mir Kabiruddin

6 October 1969	Dilkusha	3–1	Rahmatganj	Dacca, East Pakistan
	Umer 19'; Moosa 42', 47'	Report	Jalil 36'	Stadium: Inner Stadium; Referee: Moinuddin Chowdhury

7 October 1969	PWD	3–1	Dacca Wanderers	Dacca, East Pakistan
	Benu 8'; Jhunu 27'; Mahmud	Report	James 34'	Stadium: Inner Stadium; Referee: Mohammad Ali

7 October 1969	Police	Abandoned (0–0) (Note: The game was abandoned 11 minutes early due to Zahurul Alam, for reasons unclear, blowing the final whistle; this led several of Fire Service's supporters to aggressively protest, which caused several casualties)	Fire Service	Dacca, East Pakistan
		Report		Stadium: Outer Stadium; Referee: Zahurul Alam

9 October 1969	Mohammedan Sporting	10–1	East End	Dacca, East Pakistan
	Nawaz 9', 23', 52', 58', 67'; Ashraf 10'; Idrees Sr. 14', 50', 64'; Tipu 18'	Report	Amolesh 63'	Stadium: Inner Stadium; Referee: Noor Hossain

10 October 1969	Rahmatganj	2–0	Azad Sporting	Dacca, East Pakistan
	Mala; Sultan 30'	Report		Stadium: Inner Stadium; Referee: Zahurul Alam

11 October 1969	EPIDC	2–1	EGP Press	Dacca, East Pakistan
	Musa 10'; Akbar 20'	Report	Lulu 40'	Stadium: Inner Stadium; Referee: Mir Kabiruddin

12 October 1969	Mohammedan Sporting	2–2	Dilkusha	Dacca, East Pakistan
	Idrees Sr. 2'; Nawaz	Report	Moosa 18'; Taslim 51'	Stadium: Dacca Stadium; Referee: Mohammad Ali

13 October 1969	Wari Club	1–1	Azad Sporting	Dacca, East Pakistan
	Jamil	Report	Sunil 49'	Stadium: Inner Stadium; Referee: Nazar Mohammad

14 October 1969	Mohammedan Sporting	3–0	Rahmatganj	Dacca, East Pakistan
	Nawaz 26', 55', 69'	Report		Stadium: Inner Stadium; Referee: Moinuddin Chowdhury

EPIDC withdrew from the league in a letter to the East Pakistan Sports Federation, due to not being satisfied with the fact that a fixture of the EPIDC and PWD could not be replayed.

16 October 1969	Mohammedan Sporting	8–1	Azad Sporting	Dacca, East Pakistan
	Nawaz 4', 14', Amir Bakhsh 26'; Tipu 29'; Idrees Sr.	Report	Iqbal 29'	Stadium: Inner Stadium; Referee: Noor Hossain

17 October 1969	Dacca Wanderers	2–0	East End	Dacca, East Pakistan
	Kader 9', 18'	Report		Stadium: Inner Stadium; Referee: Rashid Chunna

17 October 1969	Fire Service	0–0	EGP Press	Dacca, East Pakistan
		Report		Stadium: Outer Stadium; Referee: Munir Hossain

The Dilkusha and Police match which was to be held on 19 October, was postponed.

20 October 1969	Dacca Wanderers	4–1	EGP Press	Dacca, East Pakistan
	James 3'; Imam 16'; Ansar 45'; Kader	Report	Lulu 44'	Stadium: Inner Stadium; Referee: Noor Hossain

21 October 1969	Dilkusha	3–1	East End	Dacca, East Pakistan
	Shahjahan 8'; Moosa	Report	Tipu 18'	Stadium: Inner Stadium; Referee: Mir Kabiruddin

22 October 1969	Fire Service	2–1	PWD	Dacca, East Pakistan
	Bimal 10'; Nowsher	Report	Benu 57'	Stadium: Inner Stadium; Referee: Jamil Ahmed

23 October 1969	Dilkusha	5–0	Dacca Wanderers	Dacca, East Pakistan
	Umer 21', 39'; Moosa 24'; Ghafoor 44'; Yousuf Jr. 62'	Report		Stadium: Inner Stadium; Referee: Dalil Khan
