= 1967 Aga Khan Gold Cup =

Tournament details
- Host country: East Pakistan (now Bangladesh)
- Dates: 20 October – 6 November 1967
- Teams: 11 (from 1 confederation)
- Venue: Dhaka Stadium (in Dhaka host cities)

Final positions
- Champions: (Indonesia) PSMS Medan (1st title)

Tournament statistics
- Matches played: 15
- Goals scored: 48 (3.2 per match)

The 1967 Aga Khan Gold Cup was the ninth edition of the Aga Khan Gold Cup. The tournament was organized by the East Pakistan Sports Federation (EPSF) and all games were held at the Dhaka Stadium in Dhaka, East Pakistan (now Bangladesh), from 20 October to 6 November 1967. Apart from the opening game, which lasted 90 minutes, the matches lasted 70 minutes.

== Venues ==
Dhaka
Dhaka Stadium
Capacity: 25,00
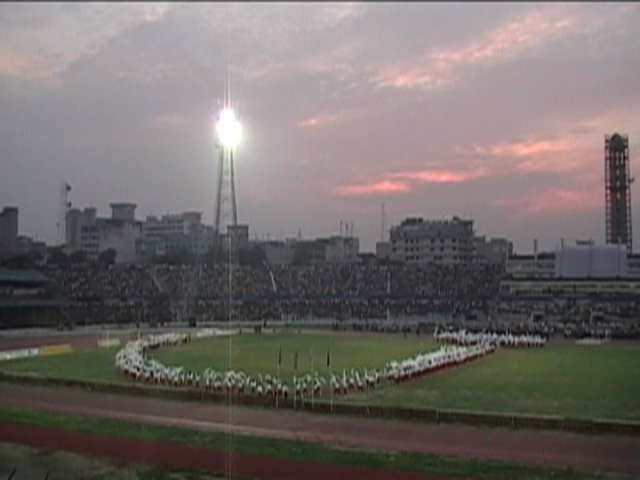

== Qualifying stage ==
=== First phase ===
19 October 1967

Fire Service (Pakistan)	2–1	(Pakistan) Rahmatganj
Aman 43'; Dipu 50'	Report	Sultan 10'

Dhaka Stadium, Dacca
Referee: Nani Bashak (Pakistan)

20 October 1967

Azad (Pakistan)	3–0	(Pakistan) East End
Saber 13', 59', 68'	Report

Dhaka Stadium, Dacca
Referee: Mohammad Ali (Pakistan)

Byes to the second phase: PWD, Pakistan Air Force and KMC, EPIDC.

=== Second phase ===
22 October 1967

Azad (Pakistan)	0–2	(Pakistan) EPIDC
	Report	Aslam 60'; Jabbar 65'

Dhaka Stadium, Dacca
Referee: Osman Gani (Pakistan)

23 October 1967

PWD (Pakistan)	2–2	Pakistan Air Force
Shuja 37', 60'	Report	Bashir 25'; Rahman 29'

Dhaka Stadium, Dacca
Referee: M Kabir (Pakistan)

Replay

24 October 1967

PWD (Pakistan)	1–0	Pakistan Air Force
Yusuf 51'	Report

Dhaka Stadium, Dacca
Referee: Mohiuddin Chowdhury (Pakistan)

27 October 1967

KMC (Pakistan)	4–0	(Pakistan) Fire Service
Umed Ali; Umer; Abbas	Report

Dhaka Stadium, Dacca
Referee: Munir Hossain (Pakistan)

== Round robin league ==
=== Group A ===
Pos	Team	Pld	W	D	L	GF	GA	GD	Pts	Qualification
1	(Indonesia) PSMS Medan	2	1	1	0	4	3	+1	3	Advance to the Semi-finals
2	(Pakistan) Dhaka Wanderers	2	1	0	1	3	3	0	2	Advance to the Semi-finals
3	(Pakistan) EPIDC	2	0	1	1	3	4	−1	1	

Source: Pakistan Observer
25 October 1967

Dhaka Wanderers (Pakistan)	2–1	(Pakistan) EPIDC
Sadeque 30'; Taslim 65'	Report	Jabbar 55'

Dhaka Stadium, Dacca
Referee: Sayed Abdur Rashid (Pakistan)

28 October 1967

PSMS Medan (Indonesia)	2–1	(Pakistan) Dhaka Wanderers
Zulkarnain Pasaribu 12' (?)	Report	James 55'

Dhaka Stadium, Dacca
Referee: Zahurul Alam (Pakistan)

29 October 1967

PSMS Medan (Indonesia)	2–2	(Pakistan) EPIDC
Zulkarnain Pasaribu 9'; Dr.Muslim 60'	Report	Abdullah 39'; Gazi 55'

Dhaka Stadium, Dacca
Referee: Issa Khan (Pakistan)

=== Group B ===
Pos	Team	Pld	W	D	L	GF	GA	GD	Pts	Qualification
1	(Pakistan) Mohammedan	2	2	0	0	6	1	+5	4	Advance to the Semi-finals
2	(Pakistan) PWD	2	1	0	1	2	4	−2	2	Advance to the Semi-finals
3	(Pakistan) KMC	2	0	0	2	2	5	−3	0	

Source: []
25 October 1967

Mohammedan (Pakistan)	3–0	(Pakistan) PWD
Rasool Bux 19', 25'; Abdullah 52'	Report

Dhaka Stadium, Dacca
Referee: Nani Bashak (Pakistan)

30 October 1967

Mohammedan (Pakistan)	3–1	(Pakistan) KMC
Moosa 15', 57' (?)	Report	Allah Bux 45'

Dhaka Stadium, Dacca
Referee: Zahurul Alam (Pakistan)

1 November 1967

PWD (Pakistan)	2–1	(Pakistan) KMC
Ghani; Dhiren	Report	Umer 40'

Dhaka Stadium, Dacca
Referee: Mohammed Ali (Pakistan)

== Knockout stage ==
=== Semi-finals ===
3 November 1967

PWD (Pakistan)	1–2	(Indonesia) PSMS Medan
Yusuf 40'	Report	Zulkarnain Pasaribu 30'; Ipong Silalahi 70'

Dhaka Stadium, Dacca
Referee: Zahurul Alam (Pakistan)

4 November 1967

Mohammedan (Pakistan)	5–1	(Pakistan) Dhaka Wanderers
Moosa 5', 9', 30'; Shamsul Islam Molla 57'; Hafizuddin	Report	Taslim 37'

Dhaka Stadium, Dacca
Referee: Issa Khan (Pakistan)

=== Finals ===
6 November 1967

PSMS Medan (Indonesia)	2–0	(Pakistan) Mohammedan
Tumsila 60', 70'	Report

Dhaka Stadium, Dacca
Referee: Issa Khan (Pakistan)
