= Sheikh Ashraf Ali =

Bangladeshi footballer and coach

Ashraf Ali
Personal information
- Full name: Sheikh Ashraf Ali
- Date of birth: May 1946 (age 80)
- Place of birth: Calcutta, Bengal, British India (present-day Kolkata, India)
- Positions: Center-back; right-back

Youth career
- 1963–1964: Mohun Bagan

Senior career*
Years	Team	Apps	(Gls)
1966–1968	Fire Service AC		
1969	Mohammedan SC		
1970	East End Club		
1971	Sporting Union		
1972–1980	Dhaka Abahani		
1981	WAPDA SC		

International career
1971	Shadhin Bangla		
1973–1975	Bangladesh		

Managerial career
- 1984–1986: BRTC SC (assistant)
- 1987: Victoria SC
- 1991: Dhaka Abahani (assistant)
- 1994: Muktijoddha Sangsad (assistant)
- 1994: Bangladesh U19
- * Club domestic league appearances and goals

Sheikh Ashraf Ali (Bengali: শেখ আশরাফ আলী; born May 1946) is a former a Bangladeshi football player and coach.

== Early life ==
Sheikh Ashraf Ali was born in Calcutta, British India, in 1946, the son of Sheikh Shahzada and Rahatunnessa. His father was a police officer. During the 1946 Calcutta Killings, the majority of Ashraf's joint-family members died, leading them to move to Jessore (now part of Bangladesh). In 1950, only two years after the partition of India, Ashraf's family returned to Calcutta due to an epidemic in Jessore. Eventually, he joined the junior team of Mohun Bagan on the advice of his father's friend, B.D. Chatterjee. He represented Mohun Bagan Jr. in the Calcutta Power League from 1963 to 1964. However, after failing to earn promotion to the main team, he permanently moved to East Pakistan in 1965.

== Club career ==
In 1966, Ashraf joined Fire Service AC as a left-winger after impressing coach Bazlur Rahman during trials. He played in the Dhaka First Division League and the Aga Khan Gold Cup for three seasons. In 1968, he was recruited by Mohammedan SC for a tournament in Peshawar as a guest player and joined permanently the following year. In his debut season, Mohammedan consisting of Pakistan national team forwards Ali Nawaz Baloch and Abdullah Rahi, won the league title as unbeaten champions, with Ashraf earning limited game time. However, after one season, he moved to East End Club in 1970, where he shifted to a more defensive role.

Following the Independence of Bangladesh, Ashraf returned to Dhaka, where he joined the newly formed, Abahani Krira Chakra. He featured for the team during their inaugural First Division League game against BJIC on 11 June 1972. The game finished goalless, and eventually, the league was cancelled after only 7 matchdays. Ashraf was mainly deployed as a center-back under Abahani's Irish coach William Bill Hart, and led the defence alongside Abdus Sadeque as the team won its first league title in 1974. In 1977, Ashraf was made captain and led the defense alongside Monwar Hossain Nannu as Abahani became the first club after independence to become unbeaten league champions. He retired from playing after representing WAPDA Sports Club in 1981 at the age of 35.

== International career ==
=== Shadhin Bangla football team ===
Ashraf returned to Calcutta after the 1971 Bangladesh Liberation War began and resided in Park Circus where his parents lived. He started representing Sporting Union in the Calcutta Football League. While practicing with the Calcutta-based club, he met his former Mohammedan SC teammate Pratap Shankar Hazra, who informed him that Ali Imam, another Dhaka First Division League player, was residing in the Mohun Bagan clubhouse. By July 1971, Ali Imam, Ashraf, and Pratap came into contact with the Provisional Government of Bangladesh and began recruiting Bangladeshi players from Agartala, eventually forming the Shadhin Bangla football team. On July 25, Ashraf was part of the starting XI during the team's inaugural match, played in Nadia district against Nadia XI, which ended in a 2–2 draw. The team went on to play a total of 16 friendly matches in India to raise international awareness and economic support for the liberation war.

=== Dhaka football team ===
On 13 February 1972, Ashraf took part in the first football match in the newly independent Bangladesh, representing the Bangladesh XI against President XI at the Dhaka Stadium. The Bangladesh XI was made of former members of the Shadhin Bangla football team, nonetheless, the experienced team ended up losing 2–0. In 1972, Ashraf represented Dhaka XI (unofficial Bangladesh national football team) at the Bordoloi Trophy in Guwahati, India. His team finished runner-up, losing 1–5 to East Bengal Club in the final. On 11 November 1973, he played an exhibition match representing Dhaka Metropolis XI during their 0–3 defeat to the travelling Soviet club, Dinamo Minsk. He was also captain of the Dhaka District team to win the first edition of the Sher-e-Bangla Cup held after independence. Prior to this, he had represented the Dhaka Division team at the 1968 National Football Championship held in Jessore.

=== Bangladesh football team ===
On 27 July 1973, Ashraf featured in a 2–2 draw against Thailand at the 1973 Merdeka Tournament in Malaysia, in what was the inaugural international match played by the Bangladesh national football team. Throughout the tournament he was mainly deployed as a right-back, in a defence which included Zakaria Pintoo, Nazir Ahmed and Abdul Hakim. Ashraf was one of the two players selected from Abahani Krira Chakra by coach Sheikh Shaheb Ali to be selected in the team, the other being star-striker, Kazi Salahuddin. He was also part of the team which recorded the country's first international victory against Singapore in an exhibition match played on their trip back from Malaysia, on 13 August 1973. He made his final international appearances for Bangladesh at the 1975 edition of the Merdeka Tournament.

== Coaching career ==
Ashraf served as assistant coach of BRTC Sports Club under head coach Mari Chowdhury from 1984 to 1986. During that period, BRTC reached the Super League round after finishing fifth in the 1984 First Division League. Ashraf served as head coach of Victoria SC in 1987, guiding them to a 13th-place finish in the 16-club league. He later returned to the role of assistant with Abahani Limited Dhaka and Muktijoddha Sangsad KC in 1991 and 1994, respectively. He served as the head coach of the Bangladesh U19 team at the 1994 AFC Youth Championship qualifiers in Saudi Arabia. In the three games played, Bangladesh suffered 0–5 and 0–2 defeats to Saudi Arabia U19 and Syria U19, respectively, but managed to clinch a 2–0 victory over Hong Kong U19, ultimately failing to qualify for the main tournament. Notable players in that team included captain Arman Mia, Alfaz Ahmed, and Zulfiker Mahmud Mintu.

== Personal life ==
Ashraf married Rashida Khatun in 1979, with whom he has two children.

On 27 December 2018, Ashraf, who attended an event arranged by the Bangladesh Football Federation in recognition of the Shadhin Bangla football team, left the venue despite attending the reception, expressing his dissatisfaction with the seating arrangement.

In September 2021, Ashraf along with former Bangladesh national team captain, the late Monem Munna, were given residential flats by PM Sheikh Hasina.

== Honours ==
Mohammedan SC

- Dhaka First Division League: 1969

Abahani Krira Chakra

- Dhaka First Division League: 1974, 1977
- Liberation Cup: 1977

Dhaka District

- Sher-e-Bangla Cup: 1973

Individual

- National Sports Awards: 1999

== Bibliography ==
- Mahmud, Dulal (2020). খেলার মাঠে মুক্তিযুদ্ধ (transl. Liberation war in the playground) (in Bengali). Bishhoshahitto Bhobon. ISBN 978-984-8218-31-0.
- Mahmud, Dulal (2014). পাকিস্তান জাতীয় দল বাঙালি খেলোয়াড় (transl. Bengali players in the Pakistan national team) (in Bengali). Bishhoshahitto Bhobon.
- Alam, Masud (2017). ফুটবলের গল্প ফুটবলারদের গল্প (transl. The story of football the story of footballers) (in Bengali). Bishhoshahitto Bhobon. ISBN 9789849134688.
- Mahmud, Noman (2018). ফুটবল পায়ে মুক্তির যুদ্ধ (transl. Liberation war fought by football) (in Bengali). Agamee Prakashani. ISBN 978-984-8218-31-0.
- Mahmud, Dulal (2018). আমাদের ফুটবলাররা (transl. Our Footballers) (in Bengali). Agamee Prakashani.
