= Ainul Haque =

Bangladeshi footballer (1947–2022)

S.M. Ainul Haque
- Ainul post-retirement

Personal information
- Full name: Sheikh Mohamed Ainul Haque
- Date of birth: 1947
- Place of birth: Gopalganj, East Bengal, Pakistan (present-day Bangladesh)
- Date of death: 28 August 2017 (aged 69)
- Place of death: Dhaka, Bangladesh
- Height: 1.83 m (6 ft 0 in)
- Positions: Centre-back; left-back

Senior career*
Years	Team	Apps	(Gls)
1964–1966	EP Police		
1967	Fire Service		
1968–1976	Mohammedan		
1977–1979	PWD		

International career
1968	East Pakistan		
1971	Shadhin Bangla		
- * Club domestic league appearances and goals

SM Ainul Haque (Bengali: এস এম আইনুল হক; 1947 – 28 August 2017) was a Bangladeshi footballer who played as a defender. He represented the Shadhin Bangla football team during the Bangladesh Liberation War.

== Early life ==
Sheikh Mohamed Ainul Haque was born in 1947 in Muksudpur Upazila, Gopalganj District in East Bengal, Pakistan. At an early age, he moved to Faridpur to live with his uncle after the death of his parents. He completed his SSC examinations from Faridpur High School in 1963 and in the following year joined the East Pakistan Police.

== Club career ==
In 1964, Ainul debuted in the Dhaka First Division League with East Pakistan Police. However, due to his job as a Policeman, he was unable to play in local tournaments, which, at the time, generated significant profits for players. In 1967, he joined the Fire Service and represented its football team in the First Division.

In 1968, Ainul joined Mohammedan SC under the recommendation of Amir Jang Ghaznavi. With the Black and Whites, Ainul won the First Division title in 1969, 1975 and 1976. He was also part of the team that won the Aga Khan Gold Cup in 1968. During his time at the club, Ainul marshalled the Mohammedan defence alongside Zakaria Pintoo and Zahirul Haque. Additionally, Ainul represented Dacca Division in the 1968 National Championship held in Jessore District.

He also played for Mohammedan during a 0–1 defeat to the touring Mohun Bagan AC on 11 May 1972 at the Dhaka Stadium. Following, the Independence of Bangladesh, Ainul participated in the first football match held post-independence on 13 February 1972, representing Bangladesh XI against President XI. The team, composed of Shadhin Bangla football team players, suffered a 2–0 defeat.

== International career ==
=== East Pakistan ===
Ainul represented the East Pakistan football team in the Bordoloi Trophy held in Guwahati, India in 1968.

=== Shadhin Bangla ===
Before the Bangladesh Liberation War began, Ainul was set to participate in a local tournament in Cox's Bazar with Narayanganj's Dhakeshwari Cotton Mills in March 1971, and when the war commenced, Ainul took shelter in Comilla with his teammate, Shitanshu. Eventually, they both travelled to Agartala, India, to receive training in order to join the war. In Agartala, Ainul met with fellow Dhaka footballers, including Enayetur Rahman and AKM Nowsheruzzaman, who were both playing in the Agartala football league at the time. He eventually began participating in the local league with Collectors football team, under the alias "Ashish".

In May 1971, fellow Mohamemdan teammate, Pratap Shankar Hazra came to Agartala to recruit players for Shadhin Bangla football team, with Ainul joining the selected players after following the conclusion of the Agartala league. Prior to joining the final team in Kolkata, Ainul played in an exhibition match, representing "Joy Bangla XI" against Tripura XI on 2 July 1971, in Agartala, Tripura. On 25 July 1971, the Shadhin Bangla team played its inaugural match against Nadia XI, in Nadia district, with Ainul marshalling the defence alongside captain Zakaria Pintoo. Ainul also served as captain during several matches, notably against Burdwan XI at the Burdwan University ground, which finished in a 2–1 victory for Ainul's team.

=== Dhaka XI ===
On 13 May 1972, two days after their match against Mohammedan, Mohun Bagan AC played against "Dhaka XI," the unofficial Bangladesh national team. Ainul played in defense alongside Zakaria Pintoo, Abdul Hakim and Nazir Ahmed Chowdhury as the Dhaka side defeated the Indians 1–0 at Dhaka Stadium.

In August of that year, he traveled to Guwahati, India, with Dhaka XI to take part in the Bordoloi Trophy. The team finished as runners-up after losing to East Bengal Club in the final. In November 1972, Ainul was part of the Dhaka XI that played two goalless draws against East Bengal Club in Dhaka. However, he lost his position in the team before the Bangladesh national team's debut in the 1973 Merdeka Tournament in Malaysia.

== Personal life ==
Following retirement, Ainul worked as a security supervisor for a private organization.

On August 28, 2017, Ainul died of lung cancer at his residence in Jhigatola, Dhaka, following a long illness. Despite receiving financial assistance from BNP Secretary General Mirza Fakhrul Islam Alamgir and his former teammate, Kazi Salahuddin, who was then the president of the Bangladesh Football Federation, he was unable to afford the costly treatment. He is survived by his wife and daughter. Prime Minister Sheikh Hasina donated 1.5 to 2 million taka to his family after his death.

== Honours ==
Mohammedan SC

- Dhaka First Division League: 1969, 1975, 1976
- Aga Khan Gold Cup: 1968

== Bibliography ==
- Mahmud, Dulal (2020). খেলার মাঠে মুক্তিযুদ্ধ (transl. Liberation war in the playground) (in Bengali). Bishhoshahitto Bhobon. ISBN 978-984-8218-31-0.
- Mahmud, Dulal (2014). পাকিস্তান জাতীয় দল বাঙালি খেলোয়াড় (transl. Bengali players in the Pakistan national team) (in Bengali). Bishhoshahitto Bhobon.
- Alam, Masud (2017). ফুটবলের গল্প ফুটবলারদের গল্প (transl. The story of football the story of footballers) (in Bengali). Bishhoshahitto Bhobon. ISBN 9789849134688.
- Mahmud, Noman (2018). ফুটবল পায়ে মুক্তির যুদ্ধ (transl. Liberation war fought by football) (in Bengali). Agamee Prakashani. ISBN 978-984-8218-31-0.
