= Hassan Ahmedul Haque =

Bangladeshi footballer

Hassan
Personal information
- Full name: Hassan Ahmedul Haque
- Date of birth: 2 January 1958 (age 68)
- Place of birth: Dacca, East Pakistan (present-day Dhaka, Bangladesh)
- Height: 5 ft 9 in (1.75 m)
- Position: Striker

Senior career*
Years	Team	Apps	(Gls)
1973–1974	Fire Service AC		
1975	Dilkusha SC		
1976	Mohammedan SC		
1977	Rahmatganj MFS		
1978–1981	Team BJMC		
1982–1984	Rahmatganj MFS		

International career
1978	Bangladesh U19		
1978–1979	Bangladesh		
- * Club domestic league appearances and goals

Hassan Ahmedul Haque (Bengali: হাসান আহমেদুল হক; born 2 January 1958) is a former Bangladeshi footballer who played as a striker. He represented the Bangladesh national team from 1978 to 1979.

== Early life ==
Hassan was born on 2 January 1958 in Chowk Bazaar area of Dhaka, Bangladesh.

Representing Pogose School, Hassan, an amateur sprinter, clinched first place in the men's 100-meter run at the Dhaka South Amateur Athletics Competition, clocking 11.7 seconds. In 1972, Hassan showcased his talent in an exhibition match, scoring two goals as Pogose School defeated Kamal Sporting Club 4–2. Impressed by his performance, Kamal Sporting's coach, Bazlur Rahman, offered Hassan the chance to play for Fire Service AC in the First Division.

== Club career ==
After spending two seasons with Fire Service, coach Bazlur Rahman, fixed Hassan's move to Dilkusha SC in 1975. Hassan formed a lethal partnership with fellow striker Golam Shahid Neelu, as Dilkusha finished runners-up behind Abahani Krira Chakra, only on goal average.

In 1976, Hassan's mentor, Bazlur Rahman, sent him to Mohammedan SC. He started in only one game as Mohammedan clinched the First Division title. The following year, Hassan joined Old Dhaka-based Rahmatganj MFS, where he was a runner-up in both the Liberation Cup and First Division. Hassan even scored in the 1–3 defeat to Abahani, which ultimately decided the league title that year.

In 1978, Hassan joined the office club Team BJMC. In his debut season, he scored a hat-trick against PWD SC. However, it was the following year when Hassan hit his peak form. Tied to the club on a deal worth Tk 1.2 lakh, he scored a total of 12 league goals, including 6 goals in the Super League round, as BJMC were crowned champions. He even scored a hat-trick in the title-deciding game, leading BJMC to a 4–1 victory over Wari Club.

In 1980, Hassan captained Dhaka District to a runners-up position in the National Football Championship. In the same year, he suffered a major knee injury during the league-opening game against East End Club. Hassan soon became irregular on the field and eventually retired in 1984 while playing for Rahmatganj MFS.

== International career ==
In 1978, Hassan participated in the 1978 AFC Youth Championship held in Dhaka, Bangladesh. On 10 October 1978, he scored the only goal as Bangladesh U19 defeated Yemen U19. The victory also marked the country's first at any age level on home soil. In the same year, German coach Werner Bickelhaupt included Hassan in the squad for the 1978 Asian Games in Bangkok, Thailand.

Hassan's only other appearances for the national team came during the 1980 AFC Asian Cup qualifiers in Dhaka. He was not included in the team that participated in the 1980 AFC Asian Cup due to injury.

== Honours ==
Mohammedan SC

- Dhaka First Division League: 1976

Team BJMC

- Dhaka First Division League: 1979
