= Mohamed Salimullah =

Bangladeshi footballer (1944–2024)

Salimullah
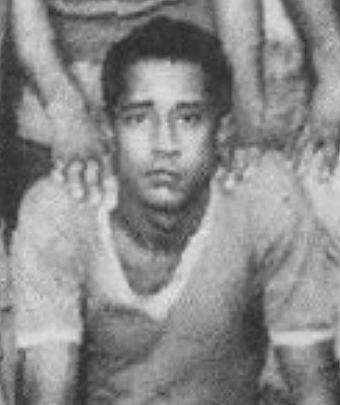
- Salimullah with EPIDC in 1968

Personal information
- Full name: Mohamed Salimullah
- Date of birth: 1 November 1944
- Place of birth: Comilla, Bengal, British India (present-day Bangladesh)
- Date of death: 26 November 2024 (aged 80)
- Place of death: Dhaka, Bangladesh
- Positions: Right winger; right wing-back

Senior career*
Years	Team	Apps	(Gls)
1963–1976	BJMC		

International career
1975	Bangladesh		

Managerial career
- 1978–1983: BJMC
- * Club domestic league appearances and goals

Mohamed Salimullah (Bengali: মোহাম্মদ সলিমুল্লাহ; 1 November 1944 – 26 November 2024) was a Bangladeshi football coach and former player. He spent his club career with Team BJMC and also represented the Bangladesh national team.

== Early life ==
Salimullah was born on 1 November 1944 in Chandina Upazila of Comilla District, Bengal.

== Club career ==
He moved to Dhaka and found employment in the East Pakistan Industrial Development Corporation.

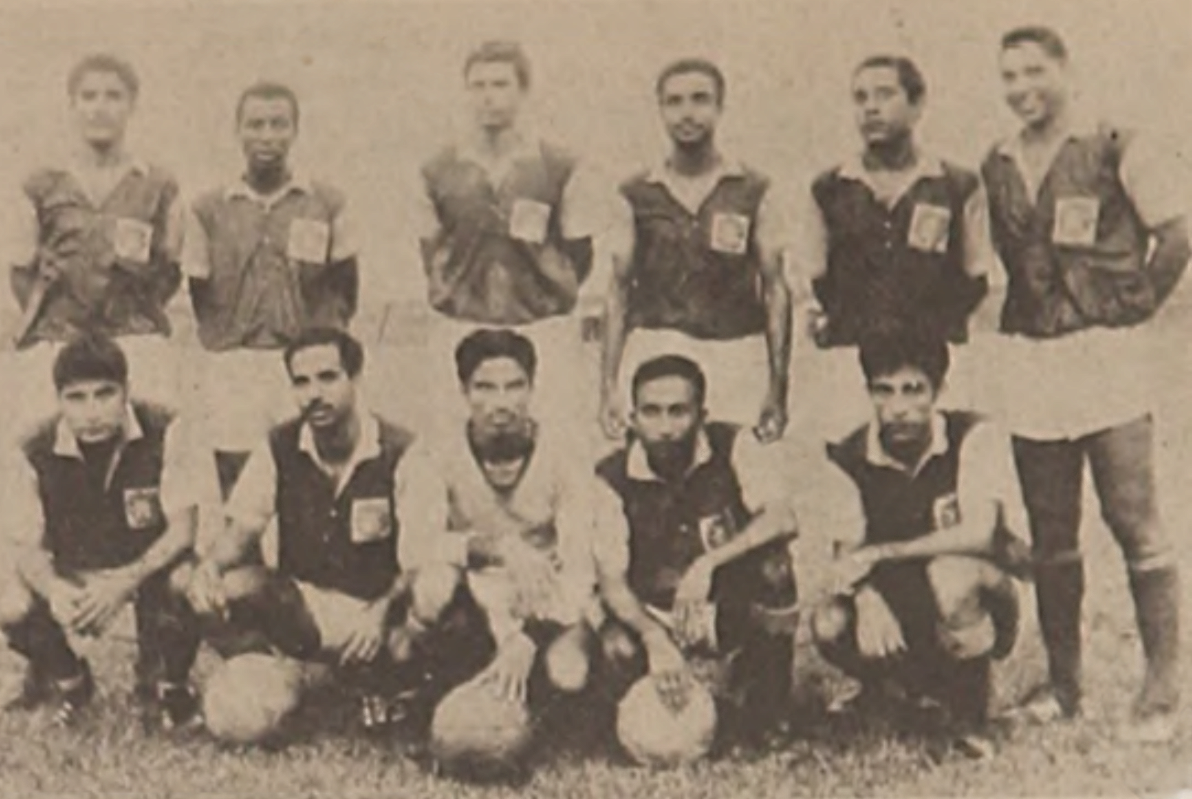
Salimullah (standing second from right) with the 1970 First Division champions EPIDC.

In 1963, Salimullah began playing as a right winger for EPIDC in the Dhaka Office Football League, helping the club win the championship that year. He played an integral role in the club's Third Division and Second Division title triumphs in 1964 and 1965, respectively. During his 16-year playing career, he went on to win five First Division titles with the club. Notably, in the championship play-off against Mohammedan on 23 November 1967, Salimullah scored alongside Abdul Jabbar in a 2–0 victory to secure the club's inaugural First Division title. He helped the club retain the First Division title the following year under the leadership of Gafur Baloch.

On 14 August 1967, Salimullah scored in a 4–0 victory over Mohammedan in the Independence Day Football Tournament final at the Dhaka Stadium. On the same day in 1969, he scored in a 3–2 victory over Dilkusha SC in the final of the same tournament. Notably, this marked the third consecutive time the club had won the tournament. The following year, he won the National Football Championship with Chittagong Division, held in Comilla, after a 1–0 victory over Peshawar Division in the final on 14 January 1970. Later that year, he helped EPIDC win its third First Division title.

On 13 February 1972, Salimullah represented President's XI against Bangladesh XI during what was the first football game held since the independence of Bangladesh. Following the independence, EPIDC was initially renamed BIDC in 1972 and later BJMC in 1976, with Salimullah being appointed the club's first captain in the post-independence era. Under his leadership, the club became the first First Division champions of Bangladesh in 1973. Playing as a right wing-back, Salimullah also helped the club win the inaugural Independence Cup in 1975, with BIDC defeating Police AC 1–0 in the final on 27 March. He remained club captain until his retirement, handing the captaincy over to player-coach Enayetur Rahman Khan in 1977.

== International career ==
In September 1969, Salimullah was selected for the East Pakistan squad for the Tribhuvan Challenge Shield in Kathmandu, Nepal, but East Pakistan eventually withdrew from the tournament before it began.

Salimullah was a member of the Bangladesh national team at the 1975 Merdeka Tournament in Malaysia, having been selected as one of the senior players by coach Abdur Rahim. During the tournament, he made appearances against Thailand, Japan, Malaysia and South Korea.

== Coaching career ==
Salimullah began his coaching career with BJMC in 1978, leading the club to a fourth-place finish in the league. The following season, he guided the club to its fifth and final First Division title, from which he won the first four as a player. The title-winning team included the likes of Abdus Salam Murshedy, Milon Karmakar Basu, and Hassan Ahmedul Haque. In 1980, Salimullah guided BJMC to an unbeaten runners-up finish in the league, ending the season one point behind Mohammedan with 37 points from 22 matches (15 wins and 7 draws). They finished as joint runners-up alongside Mohammedan in 1981. Nevertheless, the club was relegated to the Second Division in 1983 after finishing bottom of the table, following which Salimullah became involved in the club's administration.

== Death ==
Salimullah died on 26 November 2024.

== Honours ==
=== Player ===
BJMC

- Dhaka First Division League: 1967, 1968, 1970, 1973
- Dhaka Second Division League: 1965
- Dhaka Third Division League: 1964
- Independence Cup: 1975
- Independence Day Tournament: 1967, 1968, 1969
- All-Pakistan Ismail Gold Shield: 1967, 1968, 1969

=== Manager ===
BJMC

- Dhaka First Division League: 1979
