= Abdul Hakim (footballer) =

Bangladeshi footballer (died 2022)

Personal information
- Full name: Sheikh Abdul Hakim
- Date of birth: 4 December 1949
- Place of birth: Barasat, West Bengal, India
- Date of death: 28 August 2022 (aged 72)
- Place of death: Dhaka, Bangladesh
- Positions: Right-back; left-back

Senior career*
Years	Team	Apps	(Gls)
1968–1969	Dilkusha SC		
1970–1976	Team BJMC		
1977	Dhaka Wanderers		
1978	Wari Club		

International career
1969	East Pakistan Youth		
1971	Shadhin Bangla		
1973–1975	Bangladesh		
- * Club domestic league appearances and goals

Abdul Hakim (Bengali: আব্দুল হাকিম; 4 December 1949 – 28 August 2022) was a Bangladeshi football player. He played for the first ever Bangladesh national football team and was in the starting XI during the country's first official game. He was also a member of the Shadhin Bangla football team during the Bangladesh Liberation War.

== Club career ==
Hakim moved to Jessore in 1963 and completed his HSC examination from MM College, in 1968. In 1965, he became the inter-school Khulna divisional champion for Jessore Model High School. That same year he played for the Jessore district football team. He joined Khulna Jute Mills in 1968 as a football player, and became the only player from Jessore to get a chance in the East Pakistan Youth Team. He played for East Pakistan Combined University team in 1969. He joined Dilkusha SC in the Dhaka Second Division League, in 1968 and earned promotion to the First Division within a season. In 1970, he joined EPIDC, which was renamed as BIDC and later BJMC after the Independence of Bangladesh. With BJMC, he won the First Division in both 1970 and 1973. He retired in 1978, while playing for Wari Club Dhaka.

== International career ==
During the 1971 Bangladesh Liberation War, Hakim played exhibition matches with the Shadhin Bangla football team, in India. He played against teams from various parts of India, including Prayagraj, Bihar, Varanasi and Punjab. He played for Bangladesh XI against Dhaka XI, in the first official football match in independent Bangladesh, on 13 February 1972. Hakim was also part of the Dhaka XI team that defeated Mohun Bagan AC 1–0 at the Dhaka Stadium, on 13 May 1972.

During the latter stages of 1972, he travelled to India with the Dhaka XI (unofficial Bangladesh national team, as the country was not a FIFA or AFC member yet), to take part in the Bordoloi Trophy, held in Guwahati. Although he was a second choice left-back to the late Ainul Haque, coach Sheikh Shaheb Ali later transitioned Hakim into a starter. The coach also selected him for the first Bangladesh national football team, following year, after Bangladesh joined AFC. He made his debut against Thailand, as the starting left-back in the 1973 Merdeka Cup in Malaysia. He also played the 1975 edition of the tournament, which was his last for Bangladesh.

== Personal life ==
Hakim was bedridden since 2019, after suffering an Intracerebral hemorrhage and could not afford better treatment according to an interview his family gave. On 28 August 2022, he died while under treatment at the Dhaka Medical College Hospital, leaving behind a wife, a son and three daughters.

== Honours ==
Dilkusha

- Dhaka Second Division League: 1968

EPIDC

- Dhaka First Division League: 1970, 1973

== Bibliography ==
- Dulal, Mahmud (2020). খেলার মাঠে মুক্তিযুদ্ধ (transl. Liberation war in the playground) (in Bengali). Bishhoshahitto Bhobon. ISBN 978-984-8218-31-0.
