= Munir Hossain =

Bangladeshi football referee (1934–2018)

- Munir pictured post-retirement
- Full name: Munir Hossain
- Born: 1934; Dhaka, British India
- Died: 10 May 2018 (aged 84); Dhaka, Bangladesh

Domestic
Years	League	Role
1960–1983	Dhaka Football League	Referee

International
Years	League	Role
1974–1983	FIFA listed	Referee

Munir Alam (Bengali: মুনীর হোসেন; 1934 – 10 May 2018) was a Bangladeshi former football player and FIFA referee.

== Early life ==
Munir Alam was born in Dhaka, British India in 1934. He attended Dhaka Government Muslim High School and Nawabpur Government High School, and captained the football teams at both schools.

== Playing career ==
Munir began playing in the Third Division with Brothers Union, and was also the club's general-secretary. In 1952, Munir played in the Second Division of Dhaka, with Kamalapur Pragati Sangha, playing as a right-inside. From 1955 to 1958, he represented Signal Wings in the First Division. In 1959, he joined Fire Service AC, and in the same season an injury ended his playing career.

== Refereeing career ==
Munir was inspired to take up refereeing by veteran referee Masudur Rahman, who was then the general secretary of Brothers Union. He passed the level-3 referee examinations in 1960, earned level-2 recognition in 1963, and in 1968 placed first in the level-1 referees’ exam held across Pakistan. Munir went on to officiate in the Dhaka First Division Football League, the lower tiers of Dhaka football, and the National Football Championship. After the Independence of Bangladesh, he became one of the first four referees from the country to receive a FIFA Badge in 1974. He later refereed at the 1975 AFC Youth Championship, the 1976 King's Cup, the finals of the 1976 and 1977 Aga Khan Gold Cup, and the final of the 1982 President's Gold Cup, which was his last international assignment.

== 1982 Dhaka derby incident ==
On 21 September 1982, Munir refereed the Dhaka derby First Division League match between Dhaka Abahani and Mohammedan Sporting Club in the Dhaka Stadium. Following the game, six Abahani players were arrested for inciting crowd violence after the referee denied them a goal and were, unexpectedly, tried for plotting to overthrow the martial law government under Lt. General Hussain Muhammad Ershad.

== Post-retirement ==
Munir was involved with the Bangladesh Kabaddi Federation in various capacities over a period of 26 years. He became the federation's general secretary in 1988 and served in that role during different terms until 2004. He was also the technical committee chairman of the Asian Kabaddi Federation from 1988 to 2004.

== Death ==
Munir died after a prolonged illness in Dhaka, on 10 May 2018, at the age of 84. He was laid to rest at the Gopibagh Graveyard in Dhaka.

A day-long football tournament in his honor was organized by the Bangladesh Football Federation Referees Association on 18 March 2021.
