= Mohammed Sultan Ahmed =

Bangladeshi footballer (born 1948)

Personal information
- Full name: Sultan Ahmed
- Date of birth: 15 October 1948 (age 78)
- Place of birth: Dhaka, East Bengal, Pakistan (present-day Bangladesh)
- Position: Striker

Senior career*
Years	Team	Apps	(Gls)
1963–1976	Rahmatganj MFS		
1977–1980	Dhaka Wanderers		
1981	Rahmatganj MFS		

International career
1970	East Pakistan		
1975	Bangladesh		
- * Club domestic league appearances and goals

Mohammed Sultan Ahmed (Bengali: মোহাম্মদ সুলতান আহমেদ; born 15 October 1948) is a retired Bangladeshi footballer who played as a striker. He spent most of his career at Rahmatganj MFS and represented the Bangladesh national team in 1975.

== Early life ==
Sultan Ahmed was born on 15 October 1948, at his ancestral home on Haji Ballu Road in Rahmatganj, Old Dhaka. His older brothers, Awal and Amin, both played football for Rahmatganj MFS in Dhaka, inspiring Sultan to take up the sport while he was still a student at Nabakumar Institution.

== Club career ==
Sultan started his career with Rahmatganj MFS in the Third Division in 1963. Eventually, in 1965, he debuted in the First Division. Sultan captained Rahmatganj from 1973 to 1976, under coach Noor Hossain. Notably, he scored a brace against eventual league champions, Mohammedan SC, in a 2–0 victory in 1975, which resulted to be Mohammedan's only defeat that season. In 1974, Sultan represented Rahmatganj in the Bordoloi Trophy held in Guwahati, India. He also represented Dhaka Abahani in the IFA Shield and Mohammedan in the Aga Khan Gold Cup as a guest player, in 1974 and 1975, respectively. In 1977, due to a disagreement with the club officials, Sultan joined Dhaka Wanderers Club. He played for Wanderers for four years before hanging up his boots at Rahmatganj in 1981.

Sultan debuted for the Dhaka Division team at the 1966 Pakistan National Championship held in Karachi. The team exited the championship following a first round defeat to hosts, Karachi Division. In 1967, Sultan represented Dhaka Division at the East Zone of the National Championship. Dhaka defeated Pabna Division 3–0 in the final, with Sultan scoring a hat-trick. The victory secured Dacca's place in the main tournament held in Jessore in 1968. Following the Independence of Bangladesh, Sultan captained Dhaka District in the Bangladesh National Championship from 1974 to 1975, leading the team to the championship on both occasions. In 1973, Sultan played two exhibition matches against the touring Dinamo Minsk while representing Dhaka Metropolis XI and Comilla XI.

== International career ==
In 1970, Sultan won the King Mahendra Cup in Kathmandu, Nepal with the East Pakistan football team. In 1972, a year after Bangladesh's independence, Sultan was part of the Dhaka XI team which played two exhibition matches against India's East Bengal Club at the Dhaka Stadium.

In 1975, Sultan represented the Bangladesh national team in the Merdeka Tournament held in Malaysia. During the tournament he appeared against the likes of Japan, Hong Kong and South Korea.

== Post-retirement ==
On 16 December 2015, Sultan took part in a veterans exhibition match between BFF XI and Sonali Otit Club.

== Honours ==
Rahmatganj MFS

- Dhaka Second Division League: 1964
- Dhaka Third Division League: 1963

East Pakistan

- King Mahendra Cup: 1970

== Bibliography ==
- Mahmud, Dulal (2020). খেলার মাঠে মুক্তিযুদ্ধ (transl. Liberation war in the playground) (in Bengali). Bishhoshahitto Bhobon. ISBN 978-984-8218-31-0.
- Alam, Masud (2017). ফুটবলের গল্প ফুটবলারদের গল্প (transl. The story of football the story of footballers) (in Bengali). Bishhoshahitto Bhobon. ISBN 9789849134688.
