= Golam Sarwar Tipu =

Bangladeshi footballer (born 1945)

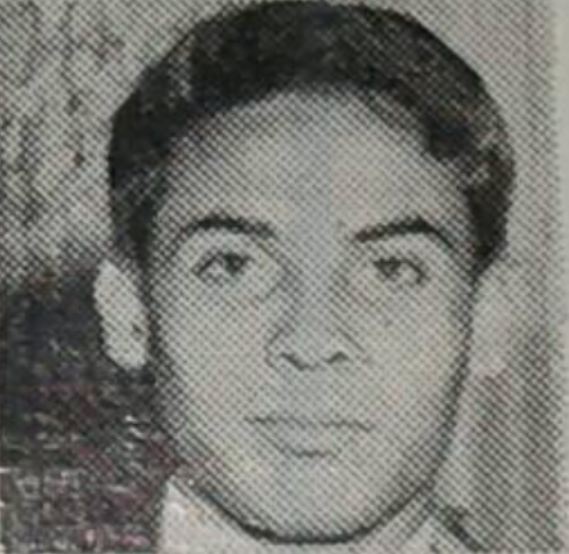
- Tipu on national duty in 1969

Personal information
- Full name: S.M. Golam Sarwar Mostafa Tipu
- Date of birth: 22 October 1945 (age 81)
- Place of birth: Barisal, Bengal Presidency, British India (present-day Barisal, Bangladesh)
- Height: 1.68 m (5 ft 6 in)
- Position: Left winger

Youth career
- 1963: Tejgaon Friends Union

Senior career*
Years	Team	Apps	(Gls)
1964	EPG Press		
1965	Wari Club		
1966	Rahmatganj MFS		
1967	Victoria SC		
1968–1972	Mohammedan SC		
1972–1974	Abahani Krira Chakra		
1975–1979	Mohammedan SC		

International career
1969	Pakistan		

Managerial career
- 1980–1984: Mohammedan SC
- 1982: Bangladesh B
- 1984: Bangladesh U19
- 1984: Bangladesh
- 1985: Bangladesh
- 1986: Bangladesh
- 1987: Arambagh KS
- 1988–1989: Agrani Bank Ltd
- 1994: Mohammedan SC
- 1998: Bangladesh U16
- 2003: Bangladesh
- 2009–2010: Muktijoddha Sangsad
- * Club domestic league appearances and goals

Golam Sarwar Tipu (Bengali: গোলাম সারোয়ার টিপু; born 22 October 1945), is a former Bangladeshi football player and manager. He is one of the few East Pakistani footballers to represent the Pakistan national football team.

== Club career ==
While studying in Tejgaon school, Tipu was introduced to neighbourhood club Tejgaon Friends Union, which he joined in 1963, after completing his Matriculation examination the previous year. With the club he took part in the Dhaka Second Division. In 1964, he was signed up by ex-Pakistani international Rashid Chunna's EPG Press, with them he played in the First Division without remuneration, before Rashid fixed his move to Wari Club the following year.

Tipu had his breakthrough season with Wari Club in 1965, and after a year at Rahmatganj MFS, he was snapped up by Makrani dominated Victoria SC. In 1968, Tipu got his move to Pakistan's strongest team, Mohammedan SC, after impressing the club's official Amir Jang Ghaznavi. Tipu made his Mohammedan debut against his former club Rahmatganj MFS, replacing Pakistani forward Moosa Ghazi. In his debut season he won the 1968 Aga Khan Gold Cup, and in the final against Ceylon Colts, he scored a brace in a 5–0 win. With the Black and Whites, he won his first league title in 1969, establishing a lethal partnership with Pakistani striker Ali Nawaz Baloch.

In 1972, almost a year after Bangladesh Liberation War, Tipu joined the newly established Abahani Krira Chakra, after being persuaded by Sheikh Kamal. Although he suffered a serious knee injury the previous year, he was made the club captain in 1973. The following year, although not in his best form, he won league title with Abahani. In 1975, Tipu returned to Mohammedan, and became hat trick champions, winning the league title in 1975, 1976 and 1978. He announced his retirement after playing against Kolkata Mohammedan in a charity match, and during the match he got an assist for Sheikh Mohammad Aslam's goal, as the game ended 1–1.

== International career ==
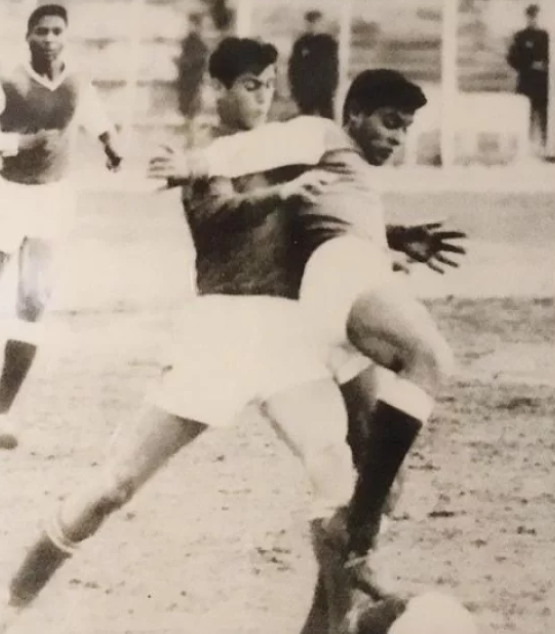
Tipu (R) in action for Pakistan against Iraq in 1969

In 1967, he trialed for the Pakistan national football team while still at Victoria SC, and after getting his move to Mohammedan SC, he made his official debut for Pakistan during the 1969 Friendship Cup, held in Tehran, Iran. He is one of the few East Pakistani players to get a chance in the Pakistan national team which was dominated by West Pakistan. During the tournament, Tipu played against Soviet club Spartak Moscow.

In September of that year, Tipu was part of the Pakistan team which played against both Turkey and Iran at the 1969 RCD Cup, held in Ankara, Turkey. Tipu represented Dhaka Division in the National Football Championship from 1965 to 1970. He also featured for the East Pakistan football team during their 1970 King Mahendra Cup triumph in Nepal.

"We could clearly feel the discrimination from West Pakistanis, especially the Punjabis."

— Tipu on his time with the Pakistan national football team.

On 13 February, during the first in independent Bangladesh, which was between President XI and Bangladesh XI, Tipu was the vice-captain of the President XI and scored the first goal of the match, which ended in his team winning 2–0 (Scooter Abdul Gafoor scored the second goal). On 11 May 1972, Tipu's Mohammedan SC took on Mohun Bagan AC, who were the first foreign team to visit Bangladesh after independence. Although Tipu was on the losing side at the end of the game, two days later on 13 May, Tipu defeated the Indian side as a member of the Dhaka XI, with Kazi Salahuddin scoring the only goal.

Later on that year, Tipu played for the Dhaka XI in India's Bordoloi Trophy, and scored in the final against East Bengal Club, as his team finished runner-up. However, a knee injury he suffered in 1972, prevented him a place in the first Bangladesh national football team, which played in Malaysia's Merdeka Tournament, in 1973. After returning from injury, Tipu could not regain his old form, and retired in 1979, without getting a chance to play for Bangladesh.

== Coaching career ==
In 1980, a year after his retirement from playing, Tipu took charge of Mohammedan SC. With them he won the league title in 1980 and 1982. During his debut year as coach, Tipu also got an opportunity to train in England. He managed the Bangladesh U19 at the qualifying round of the 1985 AFC Youth Championship, eventually failing to guide the team to the main tournament. The same year he managed the senior national team at the 1984 AFC Asian Cup qualifiers in Jakarta, Indonesia. His first win as the national team coach came against Philippines, during the qualifiers. In 1986, he was in charge of the national team again, this time during the 1986 Asian Games, in Seoul, South Korea, and the only game Bangladesh won during the tournament came against Nepal.

Tipu returned to domestic football, coaching both Arambagh KS and Agrani Bank Ltd, until 1989. He returned to Mohammedan for his second stint as coach, in 1993. He managed the Bangladesh U16 team at the 1998 AFC U-16 Championship and during the tournament his side earned a hard-fought 2–2 draw with Japan U16. His last coaching job with the national team came during the 2006 FIFA World Cup qualification – AFC first round, where Bangladesh lost 4–0 to Tajikistan on aggregate. During the 2009–10 Bangladesh League, Tipu guided a financially struggling Muktijoddha Sangsad KC to a sixth-place finish.

== Post-retirement ==
Following his retirement from football as a coach and player, Tipu regularly appears as a football pundit for various news outlets.

== Honours ==
=== Player ===
Dhaka Mohammedan

- Dhaka First Division League: 1969, 1975, 1976, 1978
- Aga Khan Gold Cup: 1968
- Independence Cup: 1972

Abahani Krira Chakra

- Dhaka First Division League: 1974

East Pakistan

- King Mahendra Cup: 1970

=== Manager ===
Dhaka Mohammedan

- Dhaka First Division League: 1980, 1982
- Federation Cup: 1980*, 1981, 1982*, 1983
- Ashis-Jabbar Shield Tournament: 1982

=== Awards and accolades ===
- 1979 − National Sports Awards.
- 2013 − National Sports Awards Lifetime Honour.
- 2018 − Rupchada Prothom Alo Award 2018.

== See also ==
- List of Bangladesh national football team managers

== Bibliography ==
- Mahmud, Dulal (2014). পাকিস্তান জাতীয় দল বাঙালি খেলোয়াড় (transl. Bengali players in the Pakistan national team) (in Bengali). Bishhoshahitto Bhobon.
- Mahmud, Dulal (2020). খেলার মাঠে মুক্তিযুদ্ধ (transl. Liberation war in the playground) (in Bengali). Bishhoshahitto Bhobon. ISBN 978-984-8218-31-0.
- Alam, Masud (2017). ফুটবলের গল্প ফুটবলারদের গল্প (transl. The story of football the story of footballers) (in Bengali). Bishhoshahitto Bhobon. ISBN 9789849134688.
