= Rashid Chunna =

Pakistani footballer

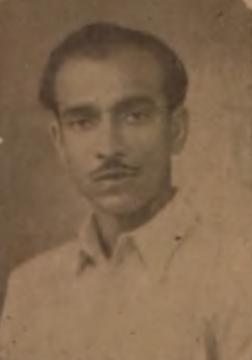
- Rashid in 1958

Personal information
- Full name: Syed Abdur Rashid
- Place of birth: Calcutta, British India
- Date of death: 1985
- Place of death: Kuwait
- Position: Forward

Senior career*
Years	Team	Apps	(Gls)
- Kolkata Mohammedan
1948–1949	Mohun Bagan		
- Bhawanipore
–1950	Aryan		
1951	Fire Service		
1952–1961	EPG Press		
1956	Dhaka Wanderers		
1958	Dhaka Mohammedan		

International career
1952–1954	Pakistan		
- * Club domestic league appearances and goals

Syed Abdur Rashid (Urdu: سید عبدالرشید; died 1985), commonly known as Rashid Chunna, was a Pakistani football player who played as a forward, and manager. He represented the Pakistan national football team between 1952 and 1954.

== Early life ==
Rashid was born in Calcutta in Bengal, British India.

== Club career ==
Rashid played in the Calcutta League for Kolkata Mohammedan, Mohun Bagan and Aryan and Bhawanipore Club. He also played for the IFA XI against foreign teams from China, Burma, and Sweden. He played for the Bengal team in the Santosh Trophy.

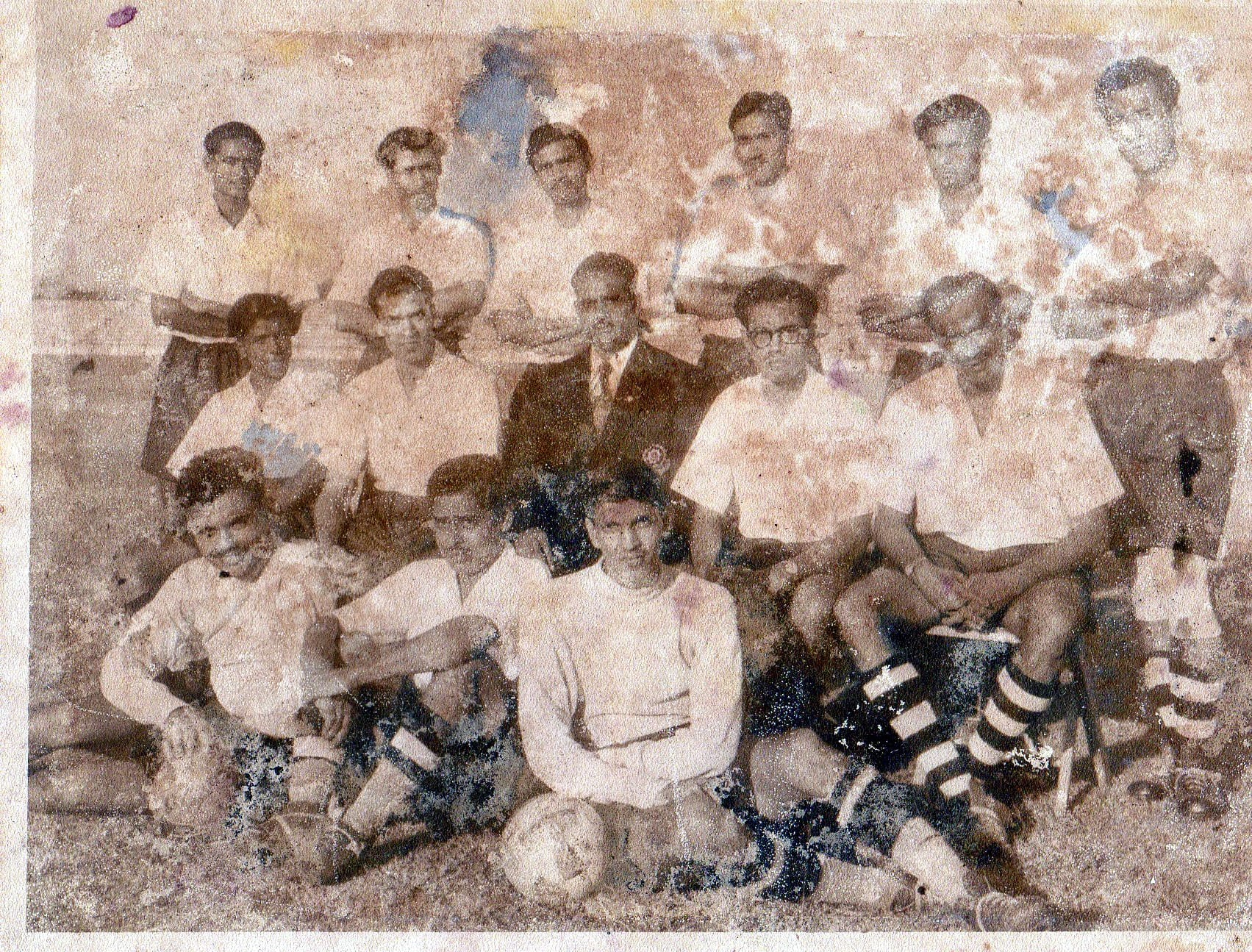
Rashid sitting far right in middle, with the East Pakistan White team in 1957

After playing for Aryan in 1950, he moved to the Dhaka First Division League in East Pakistan. In 1951, he started playing for Fire Service. In 1952, he joined EPG Press, winning the First Division title, and finishing as the highest scorer in the league. In the same year, he played for East Pakistan Governor's XI against the Indian national team which toured Dhaka before playing in the 1952 Summer Olympics, where Rashid scored the lone goal of the match.

Apart from EPG Press, he also played for Dhaka Wanderers at the Aga Khan Gold Cup, and Dhaka Mohammedan in 1958. He also played in the IFA Shield in Kolkata in 1958.

At the National Football Championship, Rashid represented and captained the East Pakistan team. In the 1957 edition, he played for the eventual runners-up East Pakistan White team. In 1963, he represented Dhaka Division.

== International career ==
In 1952, Rashid was selected by the Pakistan national football team to play at the 1952 Asian Quadrangular Football Tournament in Colombo, Ceylon. He made two appearances, against Ceylon, and in the last match against India, which ended in a goalless draw and both teams emerged as joint winners of the tournament after finishing with the same points in the table.

He was later part of the international squad at the 1954 Asian Games.

== Post-retirement ==
Rashid served as a coach of EGP Press. In 1965, he was appointed as one of the coaches of the Pakistan Sports Board. He also became a referee later on, officiating in the Dhaka Football League. Later on, he developed several players who later played at international level, such as Golam Sarwar Tipu and Kazi Salahuddin. Rashid also served as a referee in several domestic matches.

== Personal life and death ==
Rashid, who was a native Urdu speaker, moved to Karachi after the independence of Bangladesh. After a few years of his stay there, he moved to Kuwait where he died in 1985.

== Honours ==
EPG Press

- Dhaka First Division Football League: 1952

Pakistan

- Asian Quadrangular Football Tournament: 1952
