= Nani Bashak =

Bangladeshi football referee and coach

- Born: November 17, 1917; Dacca, Bengal, British India
- Died: 25 October 1996 (aged 78); Kolkata, West Bengal, India
Refereeing career
Domestic
Years	League	Role
1950s–?	Dhaka League	Referee
International
Years	League	Role
1975–?	FIFA listed	Referee
Association football career
Managerial career
- Years: Team
- 1971: Shadhin Bangla
- 1972: Bangladesh XI

Nani Bashak (Bengali: ননী বসাক; 17 November 1917 – 25 October 1996) was a Bangladeshi football referee and coach. He was the coach of the Shadhin Bangla football team, the national team of Bangladesh, during the Bangladesh Liberation War.

== Early life ==
Bashak, born on 17 November 1917, was the only son of a noble family residing on Madan Mohan Basak Lane in Dhaka, a location historically tied to his lineage.

== Career ==
He began his refereeing career in the Dhaka League in the mid-1950s and also officiated in cup competitions such as the Aga Khan Gold Cup, Sher-e-Bangla Cup, and the Independence Day Football Tournament.

Bashak was the coach of the Shadhin Bangla football team, formed during the Bangladesh Liberation War. However, according to the team's captain, Zakaria Pintoo, Bashak was only a coach on paper, as Ali Imam, one of the team's founders, usually carried out the coaching duties. The claim was later confirmed by the team's official, Saidur Rahman Patel.

On 13 February 1972, in the first football match held in post-independent Bangladesh, between the Bangladesh XI and President XI, Bashak served as the coach of the Bangladesh XI team, which mainly consisted of players from the Shadhin Bangla football team. The team lost the game, held at Dhaka Stadium, by 0–2.

He refereed at the 1975 Merdeka Tournament held in Malaysia.

== Personal life ==
Bashak's daughter, Jharna Basak Shabnam, was a famous movie star in Pakistan. He was married to Usha Basak.

== Death ==
Bashak died on 25 October 1996 in Kolkata, India.

== Legacy ==
Bashak's character in Damal, a movie about the Shadhin Bangla football team, was renamed to Arun Bashak.

== Bibliography ==
- Mahmud, Dulal (2020). খেলার মাঠে মুক্তিযুদ্ধ (transl. Liberation war in the playground) (in Bengali). Bishhoshahitto Bhobon. ISBN 978-984-8218-31-0.
- Alam, Masud (2017). ফুটবলের গল্প ফুটবলারদের গল্প (transl. The story of football the story of footballers) (in Bengali). Bishhoshahitto Bhobon. ISBN 9789849134688.
- Mahmud, Noman (2018). ফুটবল পায়ে মুক্তির যুদ্ধ (transl. Liberation war fought by football) (in Bengali). Agamee Prakashani. ISBN 978-984-8218-31-0.
