= Dilkusha SC =

Dilkusha SC দিলকুশা স্পোর্টিং ক্লাব
- Full name: Dilkusha Sporting Club
- Founded: 1964; 62 years ago
- Ground: BSSS Mostafa Kamal Stadium
- Capacity: 25,000
- President: Syed Riazul Karim
- Head Coach: Md Monowar Hossain
- League: Dhaka Second Division League
- 2026–27 season: TBD
Home colours	Away colours

Dilkusha Sporting Club (Bengali: দিলকুশা স্পোর্টিং ক্লাব), also referred to as Dilkusha SC, is an association football club based in the Dilkusha area of Dhaka, Bangladesh. The club currently competes in the Dhaka Second Division League, the fourth-tier of Bangladeshi Football.

== History ==
=== Early years ===
Dilkusha Sporting Club, based in Dilkusha, Dhaka, was founded in 1964 by an organizer that left Mohammedan Sporting Club. In 1968, a young Kazi Salahuddin scored 14 goals in the Dhaka Second Division League to confirm the club's place in the 1969 edition of the First Division Football League.

=== A period of success ===
In 1969, the club contracted a strong team for its first season in the top-flight league, being nicknamed the "Babes of Dacca Football", the side included Pakistani internationals such as Moosa Ghazi, Yousuf Jr., Abdul Ghafoor, Qadir Bakhsh, Abid Hussain Ghazi, and Muhammad Umer. Aside from the Makrani talent, Bengali players like Abdul Hakim and Shahjahan Ahmed played integral roles as the club finished league runners-up behind Mohammedan.

In 1974, the club again finished runners-up in the Dhaka League, this time behind Abahani Krira Chakra. However, there was controversy surrounding the champions, as in the last match of the league Dilkusha faced Abahani's arch-rivals Mohammedan, who planned to lose willingly to deny Abahani the championship. Mohammedan needed to lose by a four-goal margin to hand Dilkusha the trophy, and they were succeeding in their goal. But one of their foreign recruits, not knowing Mohammedan's intentions, scored a long-ranger. Nonetheless, Dilkusha still went on to win the match 5–1. The result meant that Dilkusha were still champions, but FIFA rules were not followed as instead of using goal difference to differentiate positions, the league used average goal scored, thus denying Dilkusha their first league trophy.

Throughout the seventies, the club produced many talented players such as, Golam Shahid Neelu who was the 1974 Dhaka League top scorer with 16 goals, while Bangladesh's leading goalscorer Ashrafuddin Ahmed Chunnu also represented the club in 1973, before moving to Rahmatganj MFS. Nonetheless, the club suffered relegation to the Second Division in 1984, failing to return to the First Division since.

=== Casino scandal ===
In September 2019, Dilkusha were one of the clubs from the Motijheel area of Dhaka, who were found guilty of having an illegal casino inside of their clubhouse.

== Team records ==
=== Coaching records ===
As of 4 July 2026

Head Coach	From	To	P	W	D	L	GS	GA	%W
(Bangladesh) Md Monowar Hossain	5 May 2026	Present	1	0	0	1	0	2	0.00

== Honours ==
- Dhaka Third Division League
  - Champions (3): 1965, 2011, 2015
- Bangladesh Pioneer League
  - Champions (1): 2001
- Dhaka Second Division League
  - Champions (1): 1968
- Dhaka First Division League
  - Runners-up (2): 1969, 1974

== Notable players ==
- The players below had senior international cap(s) for their respective countries. Players whose name is listed, represented their countries before or after playing for Dilkusha SC.

Asia

- (Pakistan) Muhammad Umer (1969)
- (Pakistan) Abdul Ghafoor (1969)
- (Pakistan) Qadir Bakhsh (1969)
- (Pakistan) Moosa Ghazi (1969)
- (Pakistan) Abid Hussain Ghazi (1969)

== See also ==
- List of football clubs in Bangladesh
- History of football in Bangladesh
