= Sheikh Shaheb Ali =

Bangladeshi footballer and coach

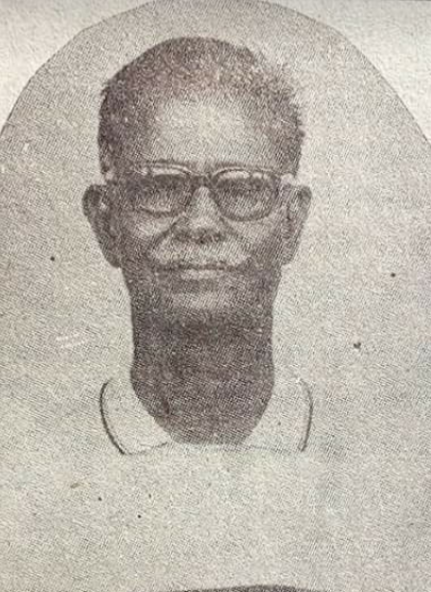
- Sheikh Shaheb Ali in 1990

Personal information
- Full name: Sheikh Mohammed Shaheb Ali
- Date of birth: 1 July 1915
- Place of birth: Dacca, Bengal, British India
- Date of death: 1 June 2004 (aged 88)
- Place of death: Dhaka, Bangladesh
- Height: 1.83 m (6 ft 0 in)
- Position: Full-back

Senior career*
| Years | Team | Apps | (Gls) |
| 1938 | Dhaka Mohammedan | | |
| 1939–1944 | Victoria | | |
| 1945–1947 | Wari Club | | |
| 1945 | Kolkata Mohammedan | | |
| 1948–1949 | Dhaka Wanderers | | |
| 1950–1957 | Fire Service | | |

International career
| 1954 | Pakistan | 0 | (0) |

Managerial career
- Fire Service
- 1959–1960: East Pakistan
- 1960–1961: Pakistan
- 1961–1962: Dhaka Division
- 1962: Combined University
- 1963: Pakistan
- 1964: Dhaka Division
- 1972–1973: Bangladesh
- 1979: Bangladesh
- 1983: Victoria
- * Club domestic league appearances and goals

Sheikh Shaheb Ali (Bengali: শেখ সাহেব আলী; 1 July 1915 – 1 June 2004) was a Bangladeshi football player and coach. He is the only East Pakistani to have both played for and coached the Pakistan national football team. He was the first head coach of the Bangladesh national football team, guiding them at the 1973 Merdeka Cup. He holds the record of coaching Bangladesh to their first ever victory in international football.

Ali was a key member of the Dhaka Mohammedan team that made its First Division League debut in 1938. He also represented the East Pakistan football team both as a player and a coach, while also earning the honor of captaining the side. Later, he guided the team to its first National Football Championship as a coach. From 1960 to 1962, he won two consecutive National Championship titles as the coach of East Pakistan and Dacca Division, respectively.

He also enjoyed a successful career as a FIFA referee, officiating in both domestic and continental competitions. Ali was also a member of the Bangladesh Football Federation following his retirement from coaching. Ali also played a major role in the administration of Kabaddi following the independence of Bangladesh.

Ali received both the Tamgha-i-Khidmat and the Pride of Performance Award from Pakistan, as well as the National Sports Award from Bangladesh, further emphasizing the significance of his contribution to football in the subcontinent.

== Early life ==
Sheikh Shaheb Ali was born in Matuail area of Dacca, on 1 July 1915. He began his football career at Kabi Nazrul Government College, where he was a student and after graduation joined the newly formed Dhaka Mohammedan.

== Club career ==
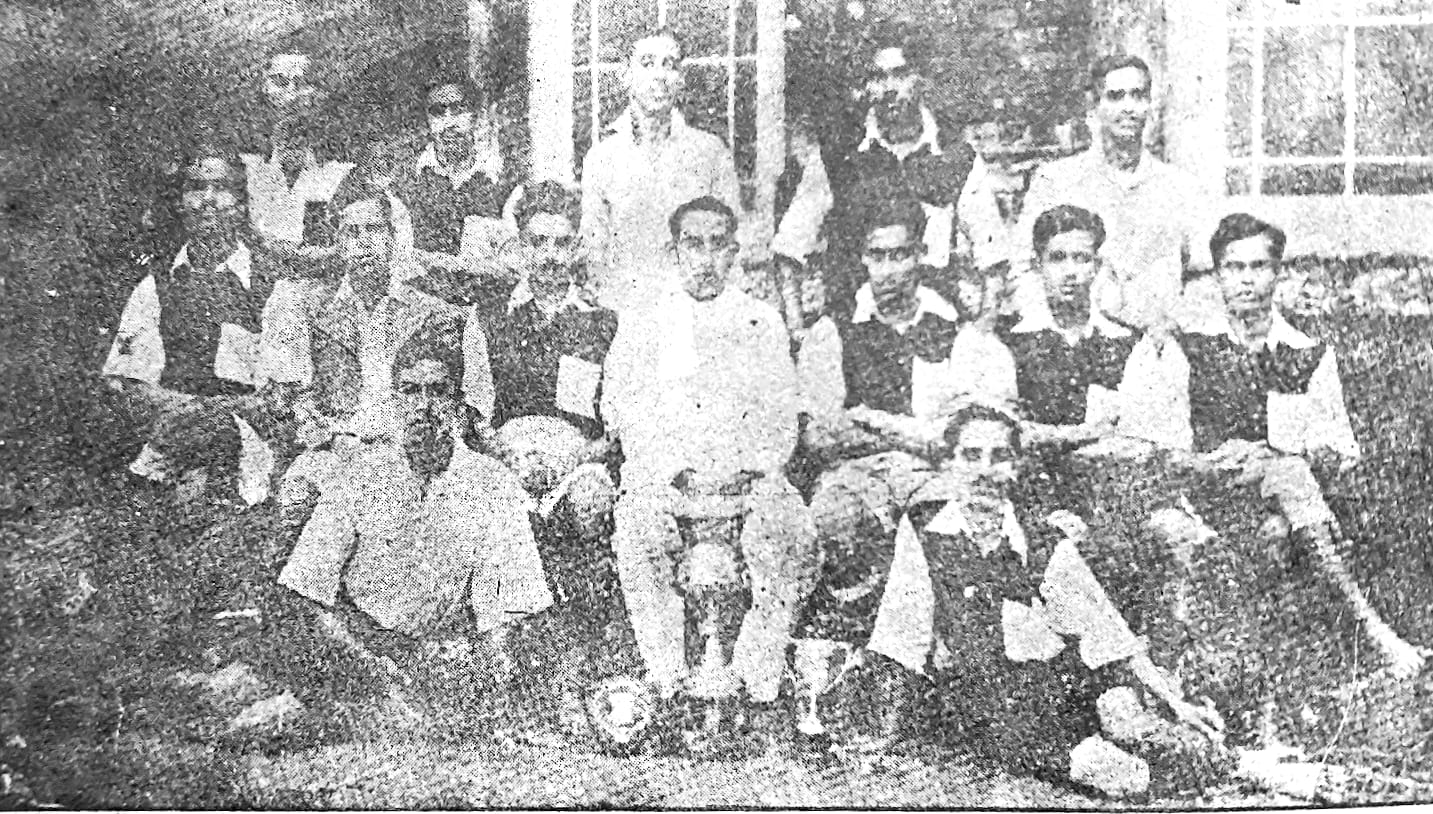
Mohammedan SC in 1938, Ali seated furthest to the left, middle row.

Ali began his domestic football career in 1938, playing for Dhaka Mohammedan as part of the club's first-ever team in the First Division. However, the following year, Mohammedan was unable to form a team for the competition, forcing Ali to leave. He joined Victoria SC later that year. In 1942, while playing for Victoria SC in the Ronaldshay Shield, he gained experience as a makeshift goalkeeper. Two years later, in 1944, he represented Wari Club in the IFA Shield in West Bengal. Wari reached the quarter-finals but were eliminated by Mohun Bagan AC, with Ali playing as an outside-left.

Ali represented Dacca in the 1944–45 Santosh Trophy, where his team were defeated by Bengal in the preliminary round held on home ground. He also played for Dacca in the 1945–46 Santosh Trophy in Bombay, where his team were knocked-out after a 0–3 defeat to the hosts. Ali also played for Kolkata Mohammedan in 1945, following an offer from the club's football secretary Abdul Rashid and captain Mohammad Shahjahan. He notably played in a pre-season match against Barrackpur Army, a team only consisting of British players. The game had to be abandoned following the death of a British player during the game.

Following the partition of India, he played for Dhaka Wanderers in the First Division until 1949. In 1950, he joined Fire Service AC and won the Second Division. He played in the 1954 IFA Shield for Dhaka Wanderers, while employed in the Fire Service. He retired from playing in 1957 after captaining the East Pakistan Green team at the National Football Championship. Notably, he had represented the provincial team since 1948.

== International career ==
Ali and another Bengali player, Nabi Chowdhury, represented the Pakistan national football team at the 1954 Asian Games in Manila, Philippines.

== Coaching career ==
=== Pakistan ===
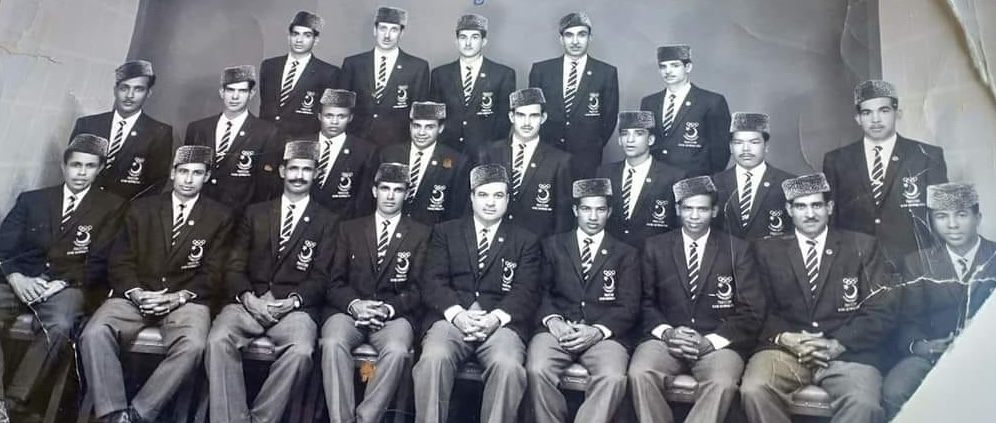
Ali sitting third from left with Pakistan national squad for the 1964 Summer Olympics qualifiers

Ali started his career as a referee in 1943 and became a FIFA referee by 1962, while working with the Pakistan Football Federation which he joined in 1958. He later trained both the East Pakistan and Dhaka University football teams.

In 1960, under his guidance, East Pakistan won the National Football Championship. Ali was rewarded with the head coach role of the Pakistan national team at the 1960 Merdeka Cup, where Pakistan finished in fourth place by claiming victories against both Japan (3–1) and Thailand (7–0). After the finalisation of the tournament he led Pakistan in friendlies against South Vietnam, Singapore and Indonesia. The next year, he also acted as coach of Pakistan national team during the test series against Burma in home venue.

Ali completed consecutive individual National Football Championship triumphs, after guiding Dhaka Division to the title in 1961–62. In 1962, he coached Dhaka University to victory in the Inter-University Football Tournament. That same year, he also led the East Pakistan Combined University to a runner-up finish in the Zonal Football Championship held in Dhaka.

He again took charge of the Pakistan national team in 1963 for four friendly matches against the touring China national team. Ali remained in charge of the Pakistan team during the 1964 Summer Olympics qualifiers against Iran, as the team failed to advance to the main round on goal average, losing the first leg in Tehran 1–4 before consolidating a 1–0 victory in the second leg held in Lahore.

In 1965, he completed advanced coaching and refereeing training in London. During his two-month stay, Ali received a week-long specialized training in both football and gymnastics at the Tottenham Hotspur Club. He also became a member of the English Football Association.

=== Bangladesh ===

Shaheb Ali's chosen starting XI for Bangladesh's first ever international fixture. The team drew 2–2 with Thailand, with goals from Enayetur and Salahuddin. According to FIFA records Bangladesh later lost the tie-breakers 5–6.

After the Independence of Bangladesh, Ali guided the President's XI team against Bangladesh XI, in the first football match in the newly liberated country, on 13 February 1972. Ali's President's XI team won the game 2–0 with goals from Golam Sarwar Tipu and Scooter Gafoor. On 13 May 1972, Ali served as the head coach of "Dhaka XI", the unofficial Bangladesh national team (not affiliated with a FIFA Confederation), in a match against Mohun Bagan. Dhaka XI striker Kazi Salahuddin scored the only goal in front of more than 35,000 spectators at the Dhaka Stadium. Later that year, he again coached Dhaka XI, travelling to India's Guwahati to take part in the Bordoloi Trophy. The team finished runners-up behind East Bengal Club.

In July 1973, Ali travelled to Malaysia as the head coach of the first Bangladesh national football team, when they took part in the Merdeka Cup. Bangladesh tied their first two games, 2–2 against Thailand and 1–1 against South Vietnam. Other than the 0–6 thrashing at the hands of Burma the team managed respectable results losing 1–2 against Kuwait and drawing with Singapore (1–1). They finished their Malaysia tour with a 0–2 defeat against Thailand. On their way back, Ali's side played a friendly in Singapore and earned their first international football win by defeating the hosts 1–0.

In September 1979, Ali was put incharge of the national team again, as Bangladesh partook in the Korean President's Cup, during the tournament Ali guided Bangladesh to only their third ever international victory, with a 3–1 thrashing of Sri Lanka. However, his side also suffered their biggest ever defeat, as hosts South Korea outplayed them with a 0–9 scoreline. Ali was the technical advisor of BJMC in 1979 and head coach of Victoria SC in 1983. He retired from all football activities after working with the executive committee of the Bangladesh Football Federation from 1992 to 1993.

== Personal life ==
Ali was one of the architects behind Sonali Otit Club, which is an organisation made of former footballers. His son, Showkat Ali Selim, is also a retired footballer.

== Legacy ==
Ali was the second troupe leader of the Dacca Boys' Scout. In 1942, he was awarded a first-class certificate in physical training. He joined the Bengal Fire Service in 1943, where he rose to the rank of Class I Instructor, having been promoted from Station Officer Class III. In 1965, he was honored with the Tamgha-e-Khidmat by president of Pakistan, Ayub Khan. The following year, Ali received the Pride of Performance Award.

Aside from football, Ali was a prominent local figure in various sporting events. In 1944, he earned the title of Bangali Bahadur from Shamsul Huda of Jinjira after defeating him in a solo kabaddi challenge. Later, in 1950, he represented the East Bengal XI in a volleyball match against the West Bengal XI, held at Sabji Mahal (River View) in Dhaka. He also took part in numerous long-distance swimming and field hockey events.

After the independence of Bangladesh in 1971, Ali retired as a football referee and transitioned to coaching the Bangladesh national kabaddi team. He became the team's first coach and led them during their inaugural international match against India in 1974. Ali also pioneered the beginning of women's football in Bangladesh, arranging a training camp at Viqarunnisa Noon School and College in 1977. From 1977 to 1983, he served as the chief sports coach of the National Sports Council. In 1977, Ali received the National Sports Awards from the Ministry of Youth and Sports of the government of Bangladesh.

== Death ==
On 1 June 2004, Ali died in his home in Gopibagh, Dhaka. He left behind his wife, three sons and six daughters.

== Managerial statistics ==
As of 16 September 1979

| Team | From | To | Record | | | | | | | |
| Team | From | To | G | W | D | L | GF | GA | GD | Win % |
|---|---|---|---|---|---|---|---|---|---|---|
| Pakistan | 5 August 1960 | 27 January 1961 | 10 | 3 | 2 | 5 | 21 | 19 | +2 | 30.00 |
| Pakistan | 26 January 1963 | 3 November 1963 | 6 | 2 | 2 | 2 | 6 | 9 | −3 | 33.33 |
| Bangladesh | 13 May 1972 | 13 August 1973 | 7 | 1 | 3 | 3 | 6 | 14 | −8 | 14.29 |
| Bangladesh | 15 August 1979 | 16 September 1979 | 4 | 1 | 0 | 3 | 4 | 16 | −12 | 25.00 |

== Honours ==
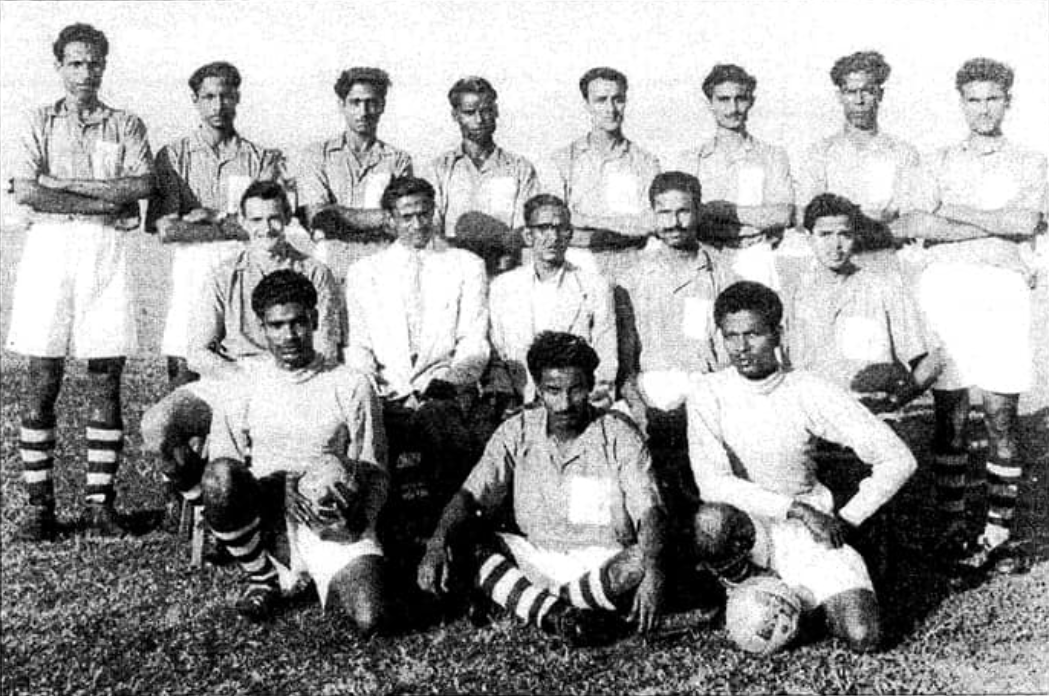
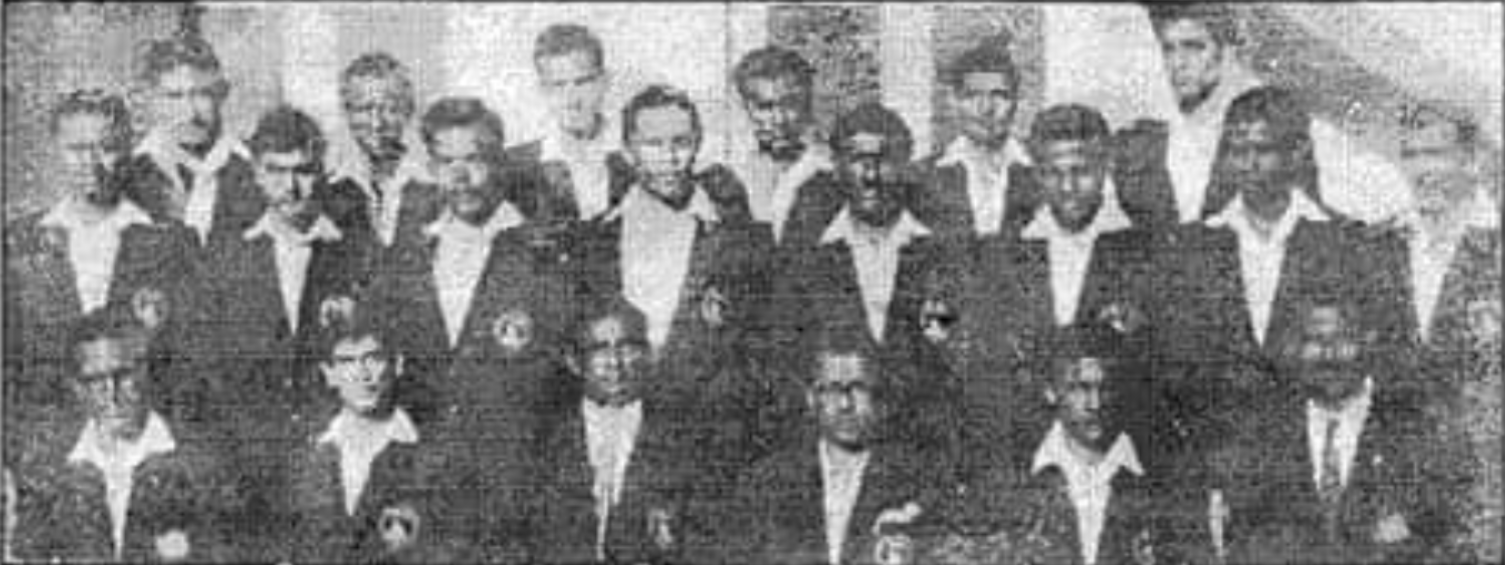
Ali as captain of the East Pakistan Green football team at the 1957 National Championship (above); and coach of eventual champions, Dhaka Division, at the 1961 National Championship (below).

=== Player ===
Fire Service AC

- Dhaka Second Division League: 1950

=== Manager ===
Dhaka XI

- Bordoloi Trophy runner-up: 1972

East Pakistan

- National Football Championship: 1960; runner-up: 1959

Dhaka Division

- National Football Championship: 1961–62

=== Awards and accolades ===
- 1965 − Tamgha-i-Khidmat.
- 1966 − Pride of Performance Awards.
- 1977 − National Sports Awards.

== See also ==
- List of Bangladesh national football team managers

== Bibliography ==
- Dulal, Mahmud (2014). পাকিস্তান জাতীয় দল বাঙালি খেলোয়াড় (transl. Bengali players in the Pakistan national team) (in Bengali). Bishhoshahitto Bhobon.
- Dulal, Mahmud (2020). খেলার মাঠে মুক্তিযুদ্ধ (transl. Liberation war in the playground) (in Bengali). Bishhoshahitto Bhobon. ISBN 978-984-8218-31-0.
- Alam, Masud (2017). ফুটবলের গল্প ফুটবলারদের গল্প (transl. The story of football the story of footballers) (in Bengali). Bishhoshahitto Bhobon. ISBN 9789849134688.
