= Aga Khan Gold Cup =

- Organiser(s): (Pakistan) EPSF (1958–1970); (Bangladesh) BFF (1975–1982)
- Founded: 1958
- Abolished: 1982; 44 years ago
- Region: Asia (AFC)
- Teams: various
- Last champions: Bangkok Bank; Brothers Union (shared) (1st title)
- Most championships: Dhaka Mohammedan (3 titles)

The Aga Khan Gold Cup was a tournament played in Dhaka, Bangladesh which invited the club sides from leading football nations of Asia to compete. Many renowned football pundits regard this competition as a predecessor of the AFC Champions League (held for the first time in 1967), since it was the first organized international competition that involved club teams around the continent. From the late 1950s to the early 1980s, it was a prestigious tournament among Asian clubs.

== History ==
When Prince Shah Karim Al Hussaini of Iran, now known as the Aga Khan IV, visited Dhaka in 1958, he expressed his interest in starting a major international football club tournament in the region. With his highness providing the funding required for the Gold Cup, the football authorities of East Pakistan, in collaboration with Asian Football Confederation, decided to go ahead with the idea. Dhaka, the football capital of the country, was the choice as the venue. The hope was to gradually develop this event into the main international club competition of Asia, with the winning team as (unofficial) Asian Champions. However, this tournament expectation was not reached, as various associations insisted on sending national selections (the team that was formed by top clubs players in the National League) rather than clubs, and the tournament was discontinued after the 1981–82 edition.

=== 1958–1970 ===
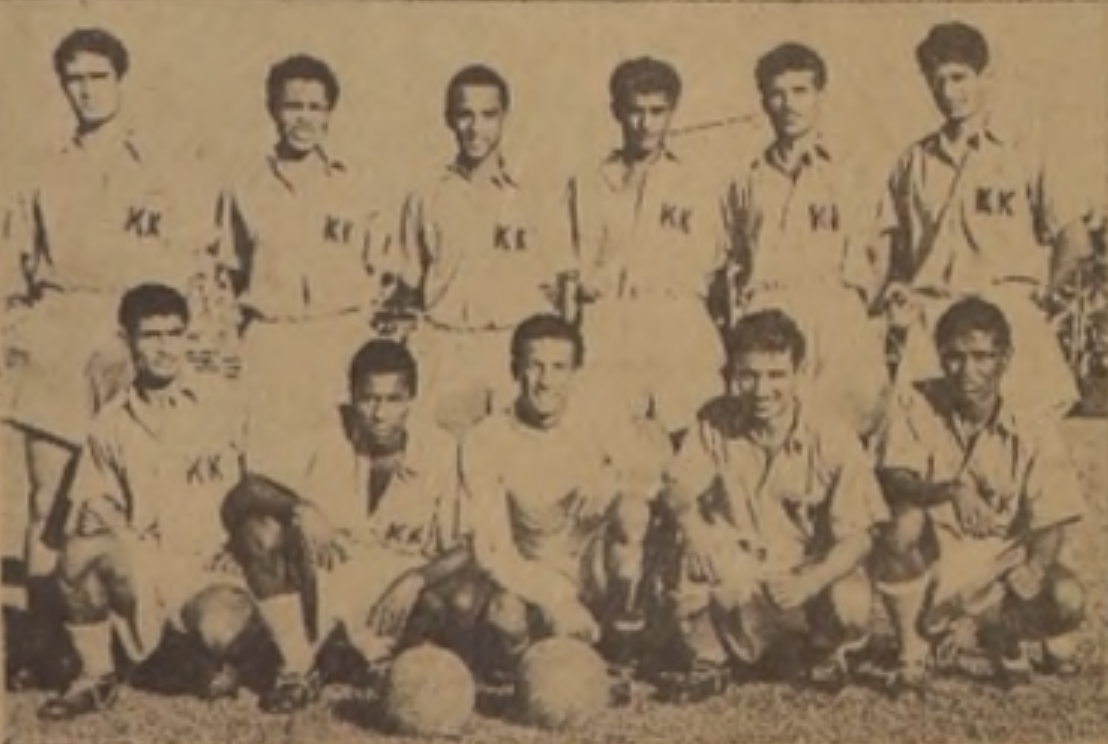
1958 Aga Khan Gold Cup winners Karachi Kickers.

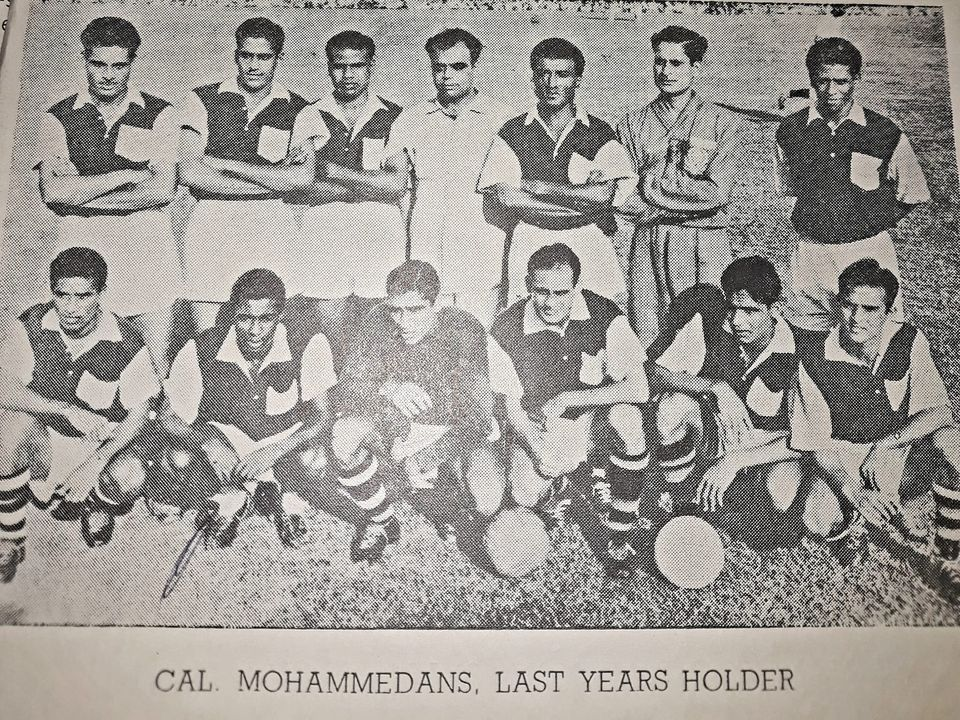
1960 Aga Khan Gold Cup winners Calcutta Mohammedan.

Teams from both East Pakistan and West Pakistan regularly participated in the event. Among other countries, Indonesia almost always sent a team, and their teams won the event three times. The Indian club from Calcutta, Mohammedan Sporting, played brilliant football to lift the 1960 trophy. Sri Lanka also sent teams regularly, with modest success, while the uneasy political relationship between Malaysia and Indonesia meant that the Malaysian football authorities frequently declined invitation to participate, and it was not until 1976 when Penang FA won it.

In 1958, the Karachi Kickers, led by Abdul Ghafoor Majna became the first champions, defeating their city rivals Keamari Muhammadan. The Dhaka Mohammedan won the double next year, winning the Aga Khan Gold Cup along with the Dhaka First Division League title.

In 1960, it was another Mohammedan, this time the black and whites from Calcutta, who lifted the trophy. The final between the Calcutta giants and PSM Makassar from Indonesia is still regarded as one of the best matches ever played at Dhaka. The Indonesians went into the final as the favorites, but the Makran players of Calcutta Mohammedan triumphed in the final, winning 4–1. The following year, Indonesia triumphed with a 5–0 win in the final against Pakistan Western Railway, and Indonesian football at that time was on a high: in August, their national team had lifted the Merdeka cup in Malaysia, while their junior team was joint champions in Asian Youth football. The team at Dhaka was a mixture of these teams, but it was officially regarded as the Indonesia XI.

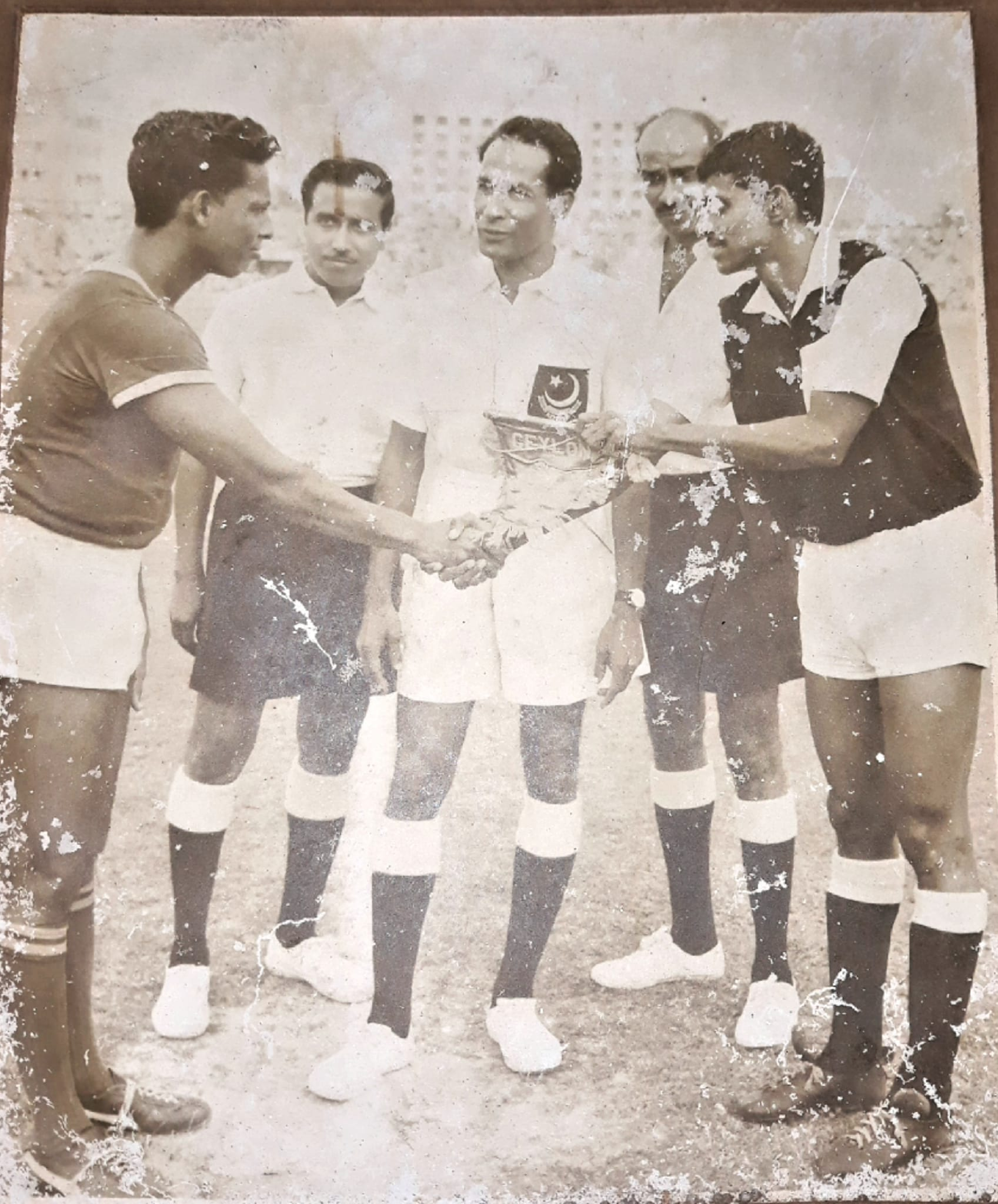
Ceylon Colts captain Zainul Abedin (left) and Dhaka Mohammedan captain Zakaria Pintoo (right) shaking hands before kickoff at the 1968 Aga Khan Gold Cup final.

After two years of foreign domination, local pride was restored by Dhaka First Division League inaugural champions, Victoria SC, in 1962. In another one-sided final, they thrashed the Young Taegeuk Football Association, the feeder team from South Korea, 5–1 in the final. Like the Calcutta Mohammedan, the Victoria side was filled with Makran players. Many at the time considered Victoria SC side to be the strongest club side in South Asia. To further emphasize the strength of Pakistani football at the time, the Pakistan Western Railway won the trophy the next year. Dhaka Mohammedan and Karachi Port Trust shared the honour in 1964, drawing the final match by nil, and the replay match by 1–1.

As Pakistan got involved in a war with India in 1965, no tournament was held that year. When the event restarted a year later, the PSSI Young Garuda or the feeder team from Indonesia emerged as the champs. They defeated Dhaka Mohammedan in the final 2–1. PSMS Medan (Indonesia) won the cup in 1967. But, the Indonesian domination was broken in 1968, as Dhaka Mohammedan, the most successful club in Aga Khan Gold Cup history, won the cup once more. In the final, East Pakistani forward Golam Sarwar Tipu scored a brace as they defeated Ceylon Colts by 5–0.

After abandonment in 1969 due to mismanagement, the 1970 final saw the Bargh Shiraz of Iran defeat the Persebaya Surabaya of Indonesia 2–1 in the final. This was the last Aga Khan Gold Cup in Pakistan, as the East was separated from West in 1971, with the eastern half emerging as the new independent nation of Bangladesh, with Dhaka as its capital.

=== After independence (1975–1982) ===
The nine-month long liberation war of Bangladesh devastated the region. There was widespread genocide and most of the Bengali football players had to flee to Calcutta (West Bengal, India) to save their lives. There they formed a team called Shadhin Bangla Football Team, under the leadership of Dhaka Mohammedan captain Zakaria Pintoo. Also included in the side was the budding striker Kazi Salahuddin, who became the greatest footballer from Bangladesh. On 28 April, 2008, he was elected as the president of Bangladesh Football Federation (BFF). Back in 1971, the Shadhin Bangla team had played a number of exhibition games against different teams of West Bengal to increase the support for the independence of Bangladesh. After the war, the authorities gradually tried to rebuild the infrastructure of football. The First Division League restarted in 1973, and in 1975, the authorities were ready to restart the Aga khan Gold Cup. Raj-Vithi of Thailand and the FC Punjab Police team from India were among the foreign participants. However, the political situation of Dhaka became very volatile, forcing the organizers to abandon the event. In November 1976, Penang FC, Malaysia took on Dhaka Mohammedan in the final. The black and whites where the First Division champions, and their supporters were hoping for a double. However, the one-sided final saw Penang win 3–0. Shukor Salleh dominated the midfield, and both the Bakar brothers, Isa Bakar and Ali Bakar got in the scoresheet. The Iranian club from Sepidrood Rasht lifted the 1977/78 season trophy, defeating an AIFF XI 3–0 in the final.

In October 1978, Dhaka hosted the Asian Youth Football Championship, meaning there would be no space on the football calendar for the tournament that year. The next event took place in 1979, the biggest event (in terms of teams or matches) after independence. However, it was felt that two group stages were unnecessary, and there was a huge discrepancy among the strengths of the different sides. The Chinese team, Liaoning Whowin, started their campaign with a 9–0 drubbing of Nepal XI Selection. The Burmese side, Finance and Revenue thrashed the Dhaka Wanderers 8–0. Abahani was the most successful local side, but for the third time in a row, they lost in the semifinal to eventual champions (this time NIAC Mitra from Indonesia). Like the Chinese, the team from Indonesia showed their strength early in the event, as they beat a strong Korea League XI Selection side 4–1 in the first group stages. The striker Dullah Rahim and midfielder Shamsul Arefin were among the best players of the tournament. In their semifinal, they easily beat Abahani 2–0. The Liaoning side defeated Finance and Revenue 2–1 in the other semifinal. The final was a drab affair; after a 1–1 draw, the NIAC Mitra side prevailed in the penalty shoot-out win against Liaoning Whowin.

In 1981–82 Aga Khan Gold Cup, the ten-team event proved much more successful. Good crowds gathered to watch the matches, despite the simultaneous World Cup Hockey tournament in Mumbai. However, some internal disputes among the football authorities of the country meant that this was the last edition of the cup. For the second time since independence, two local teams made it to the semifinals. Three-time winner Dhaka Mohammedan, was joined by Brothers Union. Brothers won in an upset in the first semifinal, defeating the Oman XI Selection. In the other semifinal, Bangkok Bank won 3–1. The Bangkok side was the clear favorite for the finals, but having got so close, the Brothers Union side was determined to show their best and achieved a 1–1 draw. There was no provision for a penalty shoot-out and the two teams were declared join champions. In March 1981, Dhaka hosted the President's Gold Cup. The organizers of the new event declared their intention to make it a competition among the national teams of the region. However, very soon it was clear that the invited countries were sending their youth teams or club teams for the event. Two international club competitions in the same city was unnecessary, and federation decided to continue with the President's Gold Cup, meaning the Aga Khan Gold Cup would be shut down. The President's Gold Cup itself became a start and stop affair before its axing in 1993.

=== Possible revival ===
Over the last two decades there has been a big change in the sporting culture of Bangladesh: cricket had replaced football as the number one sport. In this situation, Kazi Salahuddin took over the Bangladesh Football Federation presidency in 2008. Salahuddin immediately took some steps to restore the image of football within the country. However, after the initial euphoria, the idea subsided.

== Champions ==
Below are the list of champions in Aga Khan Gold Cup tournament since 1958.

Season	Champion	Country
1958	Karachi Kickers	West Pakistan
1959	Dhaka Mohammedan	East Pakistan
1960	Kolkata Mohammedan	India
1961	Indonesia XI	Indonesia
1962	Victoria SC	East Pakistan
1963	Pakistan Western Railway	West Pakistan
1964	Dhaka Mohammedan; Karachi Port Trust (shared)	East Pakistan; West Pakistan
1965	Not held due to Indo-Pakistani War of 1965	
1966	Indonesia U-23	Indonesia
1967	PSMS Medan	Indonesia
1968	Dhaka Mohammedan	East Pakistan
1969	Tournament abandoned	
1970	Bargh Shiraz	Iran
1971	Not held due to Bangladesh Liberation War	
1972	Not held	
1973	Not held	
1974	Not held	
1975	Tournament abandoned	
1976	Penang FA	Malaysia
1977–78	Sepidrood Rasht	Iran
1978	Not held	
1979	Niac Mitra	Indonesia
1980	Not held	
1981–82	Bangkok Bank; Brothers Union (shared)	Thailand; Bangladesh

== Finals ==
Season	Champion	Score	Runner-up
1958	(Pakistan) Karachi Kickers	2–0	(Pakistan) Keamari Muhammadan
1959	(Pakistan) Dhaka Mohammedan	2–0	(Pakistan) Karachi Municipal Corporation
1960	(India) Kolkata Mohammedan	4–1	(Indonesia) PSM Makassar
1961	Indonesia XI	5–0	Pakistan Western Railway
1962	(Pakistan) Victoria SC	5–1	(South Korea) Young Taegeuk
1963	Pakistan Western Railway	2–1	(Pakistan) Dhaka Wanderers
1964	(Pakistan) Dhaka Mohammedan (Pakistan) Karachi Port Trust (shared)	1–1	None
1965	Not held due to Indo-Pakistani War of 1965		
1966	Indonesia U-23	2–1	(Pakistan) Dhaka Mohammedan
1967	(Indonesia) PSMS Medan	2–0	(Pakistan) Dhaka Mohammedan
1968	(Pakistan) Dhaka Mohammedan	5–0	(Sri Lanka) Ceylon Colts XI
1969	Tournament abandoned		
1970	(Iran) Bargh Shiraz	2–1	(Indonesia) Persebaya Surabaya
1971	Not held due to Bangladesh Liberation War		
1972	Not held		
1973	Not held		
1974	Not held		
1975	Tournament abandoned		
1976	(Malaysia) Penang FA	3–0	(Bangladesh) Dhaka Mohammedan
1977–78	(Iran) Sepidrood Rasht	3–0	(India) AIFF XI
1978	Not held		
1979	(Indonesia) NIAC Mitra	1–1 (4–2 p)	(China) Liaoning Whowin
1980	Not held		
1981/82	(Thailand) Bangkok Bank (Bangladesh) Brothers Union (shared)	1–1	None

=== Referees of finals ===
- 1958 : (Pakistan) Golam Hossain
- 1959: (Pakistan) Masudur Rahman
- 1960 : (Pakistan) Masudur Rahman
- 1961 : (Pakistan) Sheikh Shaheb Ali
- 1962: (Pakistan) M.A. Munshi
- 1963 : (Pakistan) M.A. Munshi
- 1964 : (Pakistan) Issa Khan
- 1965 : Not held due to Indo-Pakistani War of 1965
- 1966 : (Pakistan) Masudur Rahman
- 1967 : (Pakistan) Issa Khan
- 1968 : (Pakistan) Zahurul Alam
- 1969 : Tournament abandoned
- 1970 : (Pakistan) Zahurul Alam
- 1971 : Not held due to Bangladesh Liberation War
- 1972 : Not held
- 1973 : Not held
- 1974 : Not held
- 1975 : Tournament abandoned
- 1976 : Unknown
- 1977–78 : Unknown
- 1978 : Not held
- 1979 : Unknown
- 1980 : Not held
- 1981/82 : Unknown

== Top-performing countries ==
Performances by nation
Country	Titles
Bangladesh^{1}	5
Indonesia	4
Pakistan^{2}	3
Iran	2
India	1
Malaysia	1
Thailand	1

^{1} Includes four titles as East Pakistan.
^{2} Pakistan competed as West Pakistan.
