= Fire Service AC =

Bangladeshi football club

- Full name: Fire Service Athletic Club
- Nickname: The Firemen
- Short name: FSC

Fire Service Athletic Club (Bengali: ফায়ার সার্ভিস অ্যাথলেটিক ক্লাব), also referred to as Fire Service AC, was an association football club based in Dhaka, Bangladesh. The club was operated by the Bangladesh Fire Service. It participated in the Dhaka Football League until the turn of the century.

== History ==
The club was formed after the partition of India with the help of William Holden, the British director of the East Pakistan Fire Service at the time. The team, composed mainly of Fire Service employees, won the Dhaka Second Division League as unbeaten champions in 1950, entering the First Division the following year.

The club roped in numerous Calcutta-based players, namely, Lal Mohammed, Nozor Mohammad, Newaz Alam, while Pakistani national footballer Sheikh Shaheb Ali, began serving as coach-cum-player from 1952. Nevertheless, the club were relegated to the Second Division in 1962. In the same year, they reached the quarter-finals of the 1962 Aga Khan Gold Cup, where they were defeated 5–0 by the feeder team for South Korea, Young Taegeuk Football Association.

In 1963, the Firemen won the Second Division as unbeaten champions and secured their return to the First Division. Following their title triumph, the team played a celebratory exhibition match against First Division outfit, Police AC, winning 4–1. In the same year, the club won the inaugural Dhaka District Sports Association Football League, a virtual reserve league introduced by the Dhaka Sports Association. In the league-deciding match on 7 October, the Firemen defeated EP Government Press 1–0. On 26 December, they finished runners-up in the Sher-e-Bangla Memorial Football Tournament held in Dhaka, losing 1–0 against EPIDC.

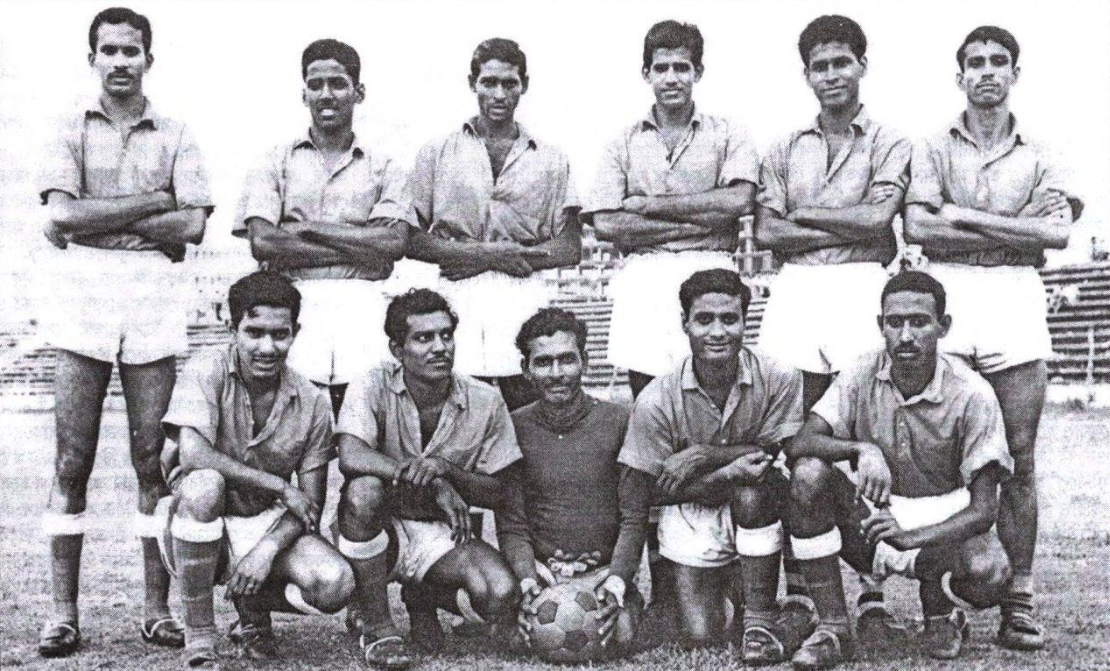
Fire Service Athletic Club in 1964

In 1964, upon their return to the First Division, the team featured players such as Hafizuddin Ahmed, Samad, Jalil Ansari, Shitangshu, Bimal Chandra Pal, and Mujibur Rahman. The team was trained by local coaches, Bazlur Rahman and Nazar Mohammad. Notably, the club defeated reigning champions Mohammedan SC 3–2 in the return-leg fixture. Mohammedan took a first-half lead through goals from Moosa Ghazi and Mohammed Rahmatullah, which the Firemen overturned with a brace from Kamruzzaman and a lone goal from Obaidullah.

The club remained mid-table throughout the decade, and occasionally caused upsets. The team finished fifth and sixth in 1966 and 1967, respectively. In the 1970 Aga Khan Gold Cup, the club caused a major upset by defeating reigning league champions EPIDC 3–2 to reach the round-robin league, as one of the only three local clubs. Although the goals were scored by attackers, Salam, Kader and Angoor, it was the club's custodian, Shitangshu, who was mainly credited for the victory. In the round-robin league, the club began with a 1–1 draw against Peshawar DFA. In their second group game, they were defeated 5–0 by eventual tournament winners, Bargh Shiraz from Iran. The firemen concluded their tournament losing 11–0 to Ceylon FA, finishing bottom of their group.

Following the independence of Bangladesh in 1971, the club suffered relegation in 1974, after going through the season without a single victory. In 1978, they returned to the top-flight as 1977 Second Division champions, only to be relegated from the First Division for the final time in 1979. The club suffered further relegation to the Third Division in 1987. The firemen remained competing in the Third Division until the turn of the century.

== Honours ==
- Dhaka Second Division League
  - Champions (3): 1950, 1963, 1977

== Notable players ==
- (Pakistan) Rashid Chunna (1952)
- (Pakistan) Abdur Rahim (1952)
- (Pakistan) Sheikh Shaheb Ali (1952–1957)
- (Pakistan) Ashraf Chowdhury (1953)
- (Pakistan) Hafizuddin Ahmed (1962–63; 1964–66)

== See also ==
- List of football clubs in Bangladesh
- History of football in Bangladesh
