= Amir Jang Ghaznavi =

Bangladeshi footballer and manager

- Post-retirement portrait of Ghaznavi

Personal information
- Full name: Abu Anwar Mohammed Amir Jang Ghaznavi
- Date of birth: 17 June 1933
- Place of birth: Bhola, Bengal (present-day Bangladesh)
- Date of death: 22 August 1995 (aged 62)
- Place of death: Los Angeles, United States
- Position: Full-back

Senior career*
Years	Team	Apps	(Gls)
1952–1954	Wari Club		
1954–1956	Dhaka Wanderers		
1956–1964	Dhaka Mohammedan		
1956	George Telegraph	6	(0)
1957	Kolkata Mohammedan		

International career
1955	East Pakistan		
1958	Pakistan		
- * Club domestic league appearances and goals

Amir Jang Ghaznavi (Bengali: আমীর জাং গজনবী; 1933 June 17 – 22 August 1995) was a former Bangladeshi footballer and sports organizer.

== Early life ==
Amir Jang Ghaznavi was born on 17 June 1933, in Daulatkhan Thana of Bhola District, Bengal.

== Club career ==
=== Early career ===
Ghaznavi enrolled in the junior commission of the East Pakistan Army while studying in ninth grade at Daulatkhandi High School. In 1949, he represented the Army team in the Ronaldshay Shield in Dhaka. In 1952, he joined Wari Club in the Dhaka First Division League, where he remained for the next two seasons.

=== Dhaka Wanderers Club ===
In 1954, Ghaznavi joined East Pakistan's strongest club, Dhaka Wanderers Club, and won the league title for consecutive years, while in 1955, he was part of the team that participated in the IFA Shield held in Calcutta, India. Following their 1955 league triumph, a fallout with club officials saw many top players depart the club alongside him.

=== Dhaka Mohammedan ===
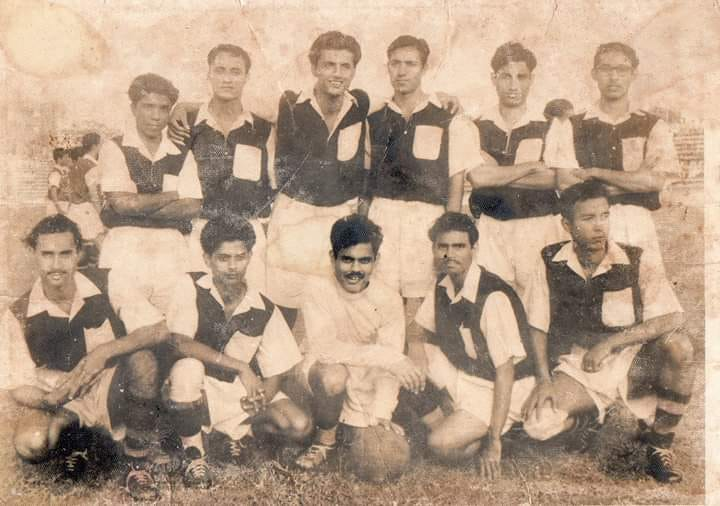
Ghaznavi (kneeling first from right) with Dhaka Mohammedan in 1956.

In 1956, Ghaznavi along with numerous teammates from Dhaka Wanderers, including Bahram, Fazlur Rahman Arzu, Ashraf Chowdhury and Kabir Ahmed joined at the time, mid-table team, Dhaka Mohammedan. In same year, he played six games for George Telegraph SC in the latter stages of the Calcutta League, helping the club escape relegation. In his second season at Mohammedan, in 1957, the club won its inaugural First Division League title. In the same year, Ghaznavi again participated in the Calcutta League, this time representing Kolkata Mohammedan.

In 1959, Ghaznavi played a pivotal role as Dhaka Mohammedan won the double, remaining unbeaten champions in the First Division and the Aga Khan Gold Cup. However, in 1960, during an Aga Khan Gold Cup match against Karachi Mughals Club, Ghaznavi was involved in a brawl after being subjected to rough challenges. This led to the abandonment of the game and the suspension of five players from Mohammedan by the East Pakistan Sports Federation. Ghaznavi, who was initially handed a five-year suspension, had his punishment reduced. However, he played fewer games thereafter. In 1964, he was part of the Mohammedan first-team squad but did not take the field.

=== East Pakistan ===
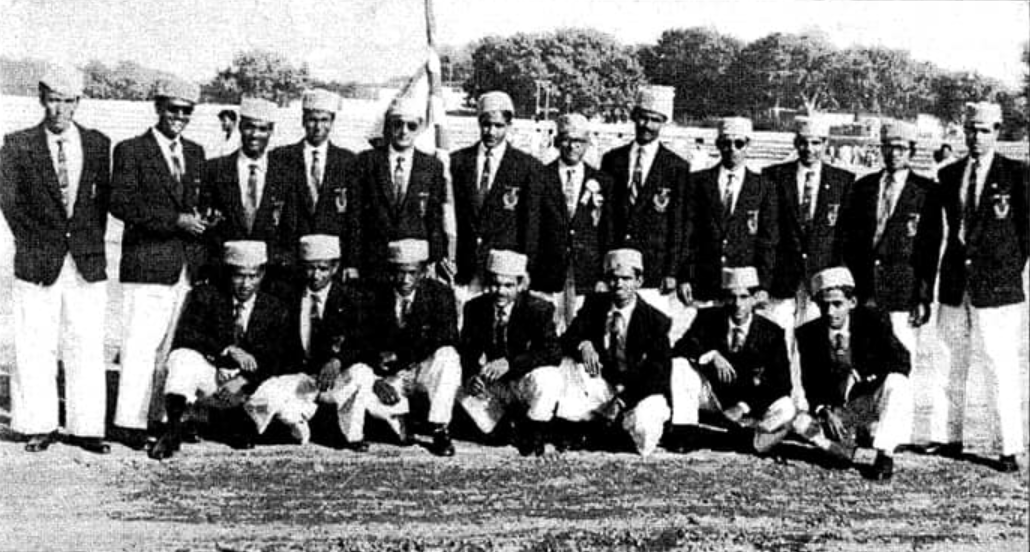
Ghaznavi (standing first from left) with the East Pakistan team in 1959

Ghaznavi first represented East Pakistan during the 1955 National Football Championship held in Bahawalpur.

In 1957, he was part of the runners-up East Pakistan White team that lost the National Championship final, held on home soil in Dacca, 2–1 to Punjab. The team, captained by Chinghla Mong Chowdhury Mari, was heavily applauded, although the region would win its first National Championship in 1960, which Ghaznavi missed due to suspension. Ghaznavi's final appearance for the team came during the 1959 edition in Hyderabad, during which the team once again finished as runners-up.

== International career ==
On 14 December 1955, Ghaznavi represented East Pakistan in an exhibition match against the Pakistan national team prior to the 1955 Asian Quadrangular Football Tournament in Dhaka. His team were defeated 1–3.

In 1958, Ghaznavi, although not selected in the initial squad for the 1958 Tokyo Asian Games, was contacted through a telegram and flown to Tokyo on a private plane to join the Pakistan national team. The team consisted of a record six Bengali players including captain Nabi Chowdhury. Pakistan tied the first game 1–1 with South Vietnam and lost its final game 1–3 to the Republic of China.

== Organizing career ==
In the early 60s, during which Victoria Sporting Club dominated Dhaka football, Ghaznavi took on the role of coach, team manager and organizer of Dhaka Mohammedan upon the request of the club's president at the time, Moinul Islam.

As the club's organizer, Ghaznavi brought in players from West Pakistan, notably central defender Turab Ali from Karachi Port Trust and Pakistan's national captain, Qayyum Changezi. He also had an eye for local talents. Assisted by former teammate Kabir Ahmed, Ghaznavi brought in a 16-year-old, Balai Dey from Khulna in 1962, and Victoria's winger Bashir Ahmed, helping the club clinch the title in 1963. The Black and Whites continued their dominance in the league, becoming champions in 1965, 1966, and 1969. In 1966, he acted as the assistant manager during Mohammedan's Mohammad Ali Bogra Shield triumph.

In the late 60s, he brought in Bengali forward Golam Sarwar Tipu and Hafizuddin Ahmed to Mohammedan. Both players helped the club win the 1968 Aga Khan Gold Cup and the 1969 league title as unbeaten champions and later represented the Pakistan national football team.

It would be wrong to say he (Ghaznavi) was only a coach, he was Mohammedan's heart

— Moinuddin Ahmed, former Dhaka Mohammedan player.

Following the Independence of Bangladesh, Ghaznavi served in the Bangladesh Football Federation from 1972 to 1979. He was part of the committee which selected the first Bangladesh national football team in 1973. In 1980, Ghaznavi brought Azad Sporting Club forward Abdus Salam Murshedy to Mohammedan, who would repay his faith by scoring a record 27 league goals in 1982, as Mohammedan won its fifth league title after the country's independence. In the same year, they would become the first Bangladeshi club to win a title on foreign soil, clinching the Ashish Jabbar football tournament in Durgapur, India.

== Personal life ==
Bhola Stadium was named Ghaznavi Stadium in his honor.

Ghaznavi died on 22 August 1995 while undergoing treatment for hepatitis for four years in Los Angeles, US. He is buried in Banani graveyard in Dhaka, Bangladesh.

== Honours ==
Dhaka Wanderers

- Dhaka First Division League: 1954, 1955
- Independence Day Football Tournament: 1955

Dhaka Mohammedan

- Dhaka First Division League: 1957, 1959, 1961, 1963
- Independence Day Football Tournament: 1958, 1960, 1961, 1963
- Aga Khan Gold Cup: 1959

East Pakistan White

- National Football Championship runner-up: 1957

East Pakistan

- National Football Championship runner-up: 1959

Individual

- 1996 − National Sports Awards.

== Bibliography ==
- Dulal, Mahmud (2014). পাকিস্তান জাতীয় দল বাঙালি খেলোয়াড় (transl. Bengali players in the Pakistan national team) (in Bengali). Bishhoshahitto Bhobon.
- Dulal, Mahmud (2020). খেলার মাঠে মুক্তিযুদ্ধ (transl. Liberation war in the playground) (in Bengali). Bishhoshahitto Bhobon. ISBN 978-984-8218-31-0.
- Alam, Masud (2017). ফুটবলের গল্প ফুটবলারদের গল্প (transl. The story of football the story of footballers) (in Bengali). Bishhoshahitto Bhobon. ISBN 9789849134688.
