= Lal Muhammad Khamisa =

Pakistani former footballer

Personal information
- Full name: Lal Muhammad Khamisa
- Date of birth: Unknown
- Place of birth: Karachi, British India
- Position: Defender

Senior career*
Years	Team	Apps	(Gls)
19??–1965	Victoria		
1966	Dacca Wanderers		
1968–1970s	Pakistan Airlines		
- * Club domestic league appearances and goals

Lal Muhammad Khamisa, known by his nickname, Khamisa Boss, was a Pakistani footballer who played in the 1960s, Khamisa was known as one of the best defenders of his era.

== Early life ==
Khamisa was born in Lyari, British India, being native to the Sheedi community.

== Playing career ==
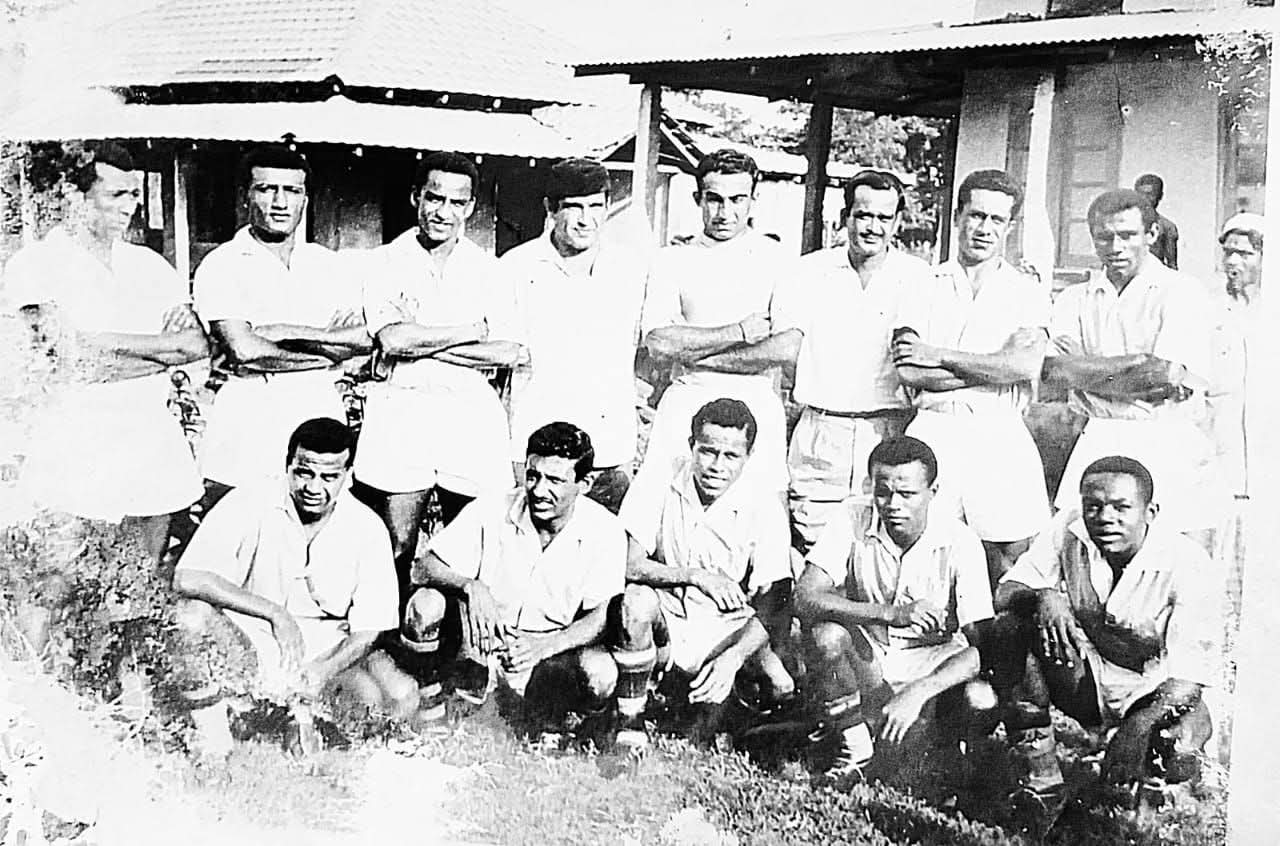
Khamisa (extreme right, sitting row) with Victoria in the 1960s.

Khamisa was notably known for his time at Victoria Sporting Club of Dacca, forming a solid partnership with fellow defender Hussain Killer. During his time at the club, he helped the club win the 1962 Aga Khan Gold Cup, the Dhaka Football League twice in 1962 and 1964, along with the Independence Day Football Tournament, and the All-Pakistan Mohammad Ali Bogra Memorial Tournament. During his time at the Dhaka League, he represented the Dacca Division football team at the 1962 National Football Championship.

On 29 May 1964, Khamisa, along with Wari's Zamboo, were handed a one match suspension each from the Dhaka First Division Football League by the East Pakistan Sports Federation, due to an incident which occurred in a match between Victoria and Wari, where both players attacked each other.

Khamisa was also selected for the East Pakistan football team during his time at Victoria, for an exhibition match against Fortuna Düsseldorf of Germany. The match would end in a 1–4 defeat.

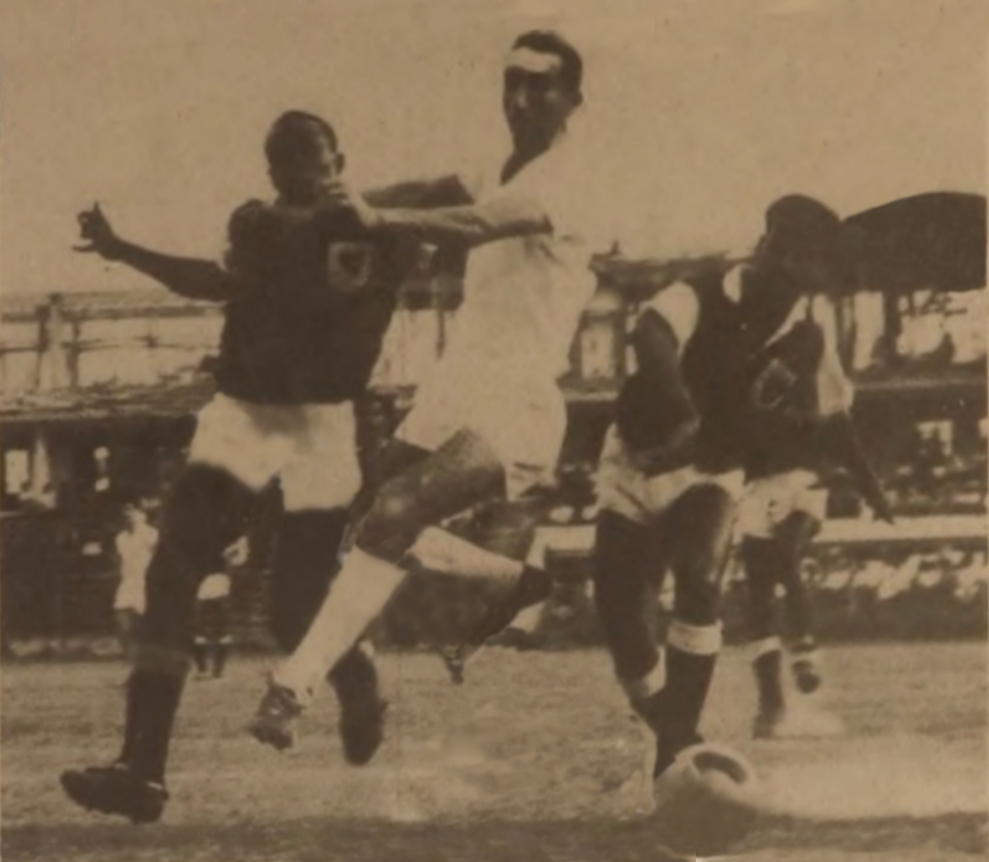
Khamisa (left) trying to win the ball in a match of the Aga Khan Gold Cup between Dacca Wanderers and Iran in 1966.

In 1966, Khamisa joined Dacca Wanderers, helping them earn a runners-up position in the league, as well as helping them reach the semi-finals of the 1966 Aga Khan Gold Cup.

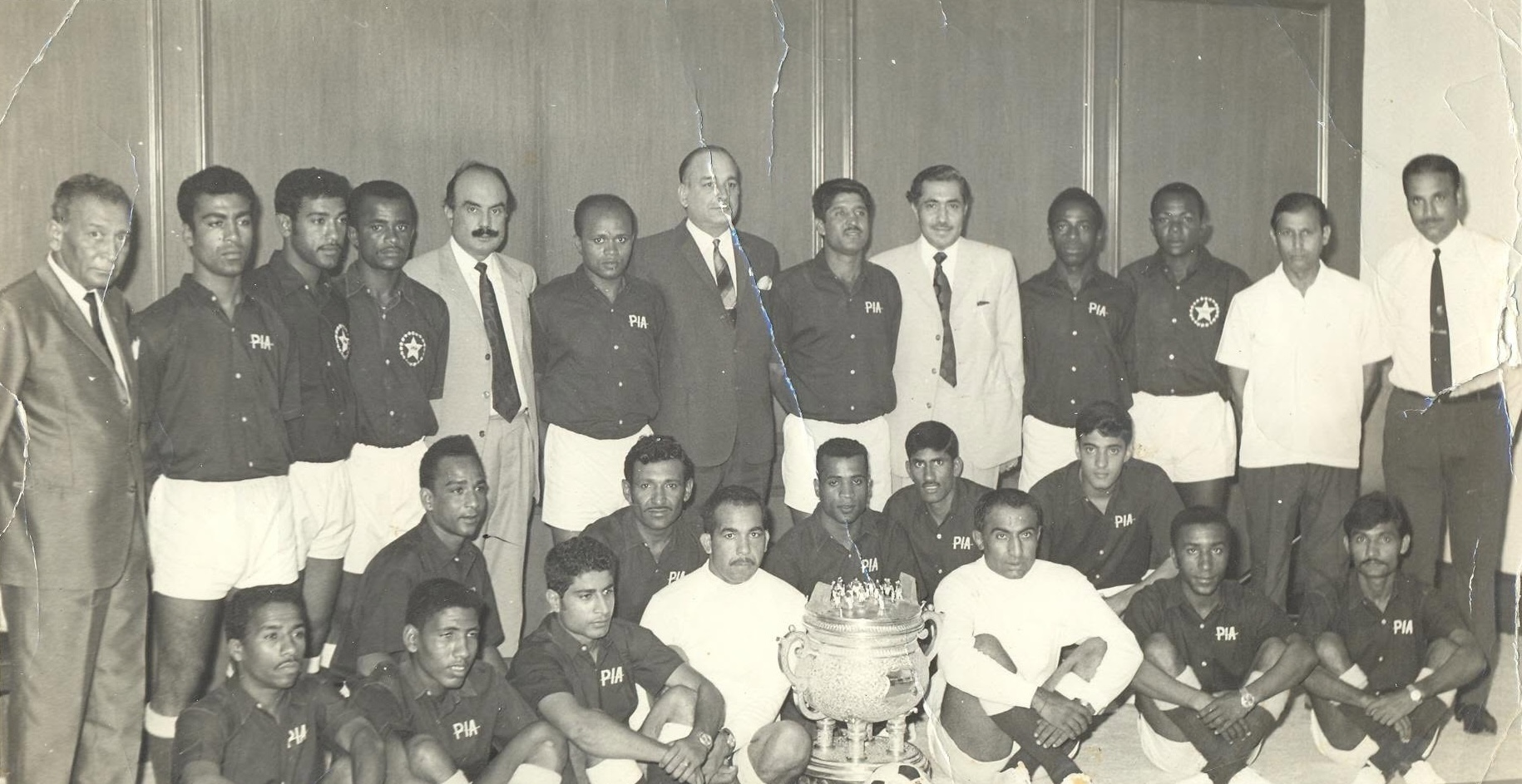
Khamisa (third from right, standing row) with Pakistan Airlines in 1971.

Later on in 1968, Khamisa would join Pakistan Airlines, playing for the departmental team for several years until retiring.

Khamisa also trialed for the Pakistan national football, however, never made the cut to the senior team.

== Honours ==
=== Victoria ===
- Dhaka First Division League:
  - Winners (2): 1962, 1964
  - Runners-up (1): 1965
- Aga Khan Gold Cup:
  - Winners (1): 1962
- Independence Day Football Tournament:
  - Winners (3): 1961, 1962, 1964
  - Runners-up (1): 1965
- All-Pakistan Mohammad Ali Bogra Memorial Tournament:
  - Winners (2): 1963, 1964

=== Dacca Wanderers ===
- Dhaka First Division League:
  - Runners-up (1): 1966

=== Pakistan Airlines ===
- All-Pakistan Quaid-e-Azam Football League Tournament:
  - Winners (1): 1971
