= George Macwa =

Bangladeshi footballer (1931–1998)

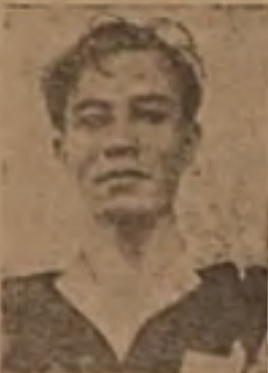
- Macwa with Dhaka Wanderers Club in 1954

Personal information
- Full name: George Macwa
- Date of birth: 1931
- Place of birth: Chittagong, Bengal, British India
- Date of death: December 1998 (aged 66–67)
- Place of death: Chittagong, Bangladesh
- Height: 1.80 m (5 ft 11 in)
- Position: Inside left

Senior career*
Years	Team	Apps	(Gls)
1950–1952	Railway		
1952–1955	Chittagong Mohammedan		
1953–1954	Dhaka Wanderers		
1955	Kolkata Mohammedan		
1955–1965	Railway		
- * Club domestic league appearances and goals

George Macwa (1931 – December 1998), alternatively spelled Mackwa, was an Anglo-Indian footballer from Bangladesh who played as a left-inside. He represented the East Pakistan team and is considered one of the best footballers from Chittagong. He spent most of his career playing for Railway S.A. in both Dhaka and Chittagong.

== Early life ==
Macwa was born in 1931 into an Anglo-Indian family in Chittagong, Bengal. He attended St. Placid's School in Chittagong, where he began playing football for the school team.

== Playing career ==
In 1948, Macwa began playing competitive football with Chittagong Medical College in the CDSA Football Tournament. In 1949, he played for Chittagong's Firingi Bazar FC in the regional competition.

In 1950, Macwa became employed at East Bengal Railway in Chittagong. He began representing Railway S.A. in both the Chittagong and Dhaka First Division Football League. In debut season, he played in the Independence Day Football Tournament final on 14 August, which Railways lost by 1–0 to Dhaka City. In 1952, he left his Railway job and joined Chittagong Mohammedan, a club he represented in the regional league for the following three years. In 1953, he participated in the IFA Shield in West Bengal, India with Chittagong Mohammedan.

Macwa represented Dhaka Wanderers Club in the First Division of Dhaka from 1953 to 1952, and won the league title in both seasons. In the 1953 First Division title deciding match against Azad SC on 31 July, Macwa scorerd in a 3–0 victory for the Wanderers. In 1955, he played for Kolkata Mohammedan in the First Division of the Calcutta Football League. He also participated in the Durand Cup and Rovers Cup during his short stay with the team. In the same year, he was re-employed at the Railways. On 9 May 1959, he represented Railway S.A. in an exhibition match against the Pakistan national team at Niaz Stadium in Chittagong, which his team lost 9–1.

In the National Football Championship of Pakistan, Macwa represented East Pakistan in 1950 in Quetta and Pakistan Combined Railway in 1952 in Dhaka. In 1962, he was part of the Railway team which finished runner-up in the Ronaldshay Shield, losing to Jagannath University in the final. In 1963, he helped Eastern Railway qualify for the National Championship main round as champions of the East Zone. In the final against Chittagong District, which Railway won 3–2, Macwa assisted their second goal. However, he did not represent the team in the main round of the championship. He represented Azad SC in the 1964 Aga Khan Gold Cup. He kept playing for the Railway team in the First Division of Dhaka until 1965. In 1951, he featured for runner-up Chittagong District in the Inter-District Football Tournament. In 1964, he became an Inter-District champion with Chittagong District, a team he represented until 1966.

== Personal life and death ==
Macwa died in December 1998 in Chittagong, Bangladesh.

In March 2024, he was posthumously honoured with the Independence Memorial Award by the Chattogram City Corporation.

== Honours ==
Dhaka Wanderers Club

- Dhaka First Division League: 1953, 1954

Chittagong District

- Inter-District Football Tournament: 1964
