= Muhammad Siddiq (footballer) =

Pakistani footballer (1933 – 2020)

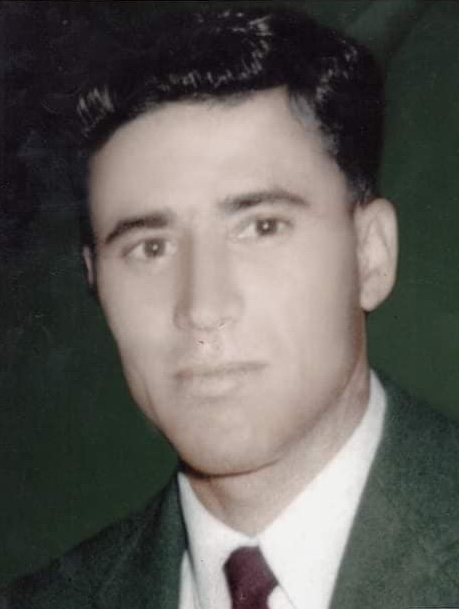
- Siddiq in 1960

Personal information
- Full name: Muhammad Siddiq Tajik
- Date of birth: 1933
- Place of birth: Quetta, British India
- Date of death: 26 May 2020 (aged 86–87)
- Place of death: Quetta, Pakistan
- Position: Goalkeeper

Youth career
- Hazara Club Quetta
- Baloch Club

Senior career*
| Years | Team | Apps | (Gls) |
- Pakistan Railways
- Ordnance Depot Quetta
| 1960–1961 | Dhaka Mohammedan | | |

International career
| 1958–1961 | Pakistan | | |
- * Club domestic league appearances and goals

Muhammad Siddiq (Urdu: محمد صدیق; 1933 – 26 May 2020), also known as Master Siddiq or Siddiq Tajik, was a Pakistani footballer who played as a goalkeeper. Siddiq is among the major players of the Pakistan national football team in the 1950s and 1960s, and is considered one of the most successful goalkeepers to play for Pakistan in the nation's early years.

== Early life ==
Siddiq was born in Quetta, the capital in the Baluchistan Agency of British India in 1933.

== Club career ==
Siddiq started his youth career with Hazara Club Quetta, and later played for Baloch Club, Pakistan Railways, and Ordnance Depot Quetta. He also played out of position as a centre-half and inside-right in his school team. He also represented the Balochistan provincial team at the National Football Championship.

He also played at Dhaka Mohammedan at the Dhaka League in East Pakistan. During his stay at the club, he represented the East Pakistan football team selection and won the 1960 National Football Championship.

== International career ==
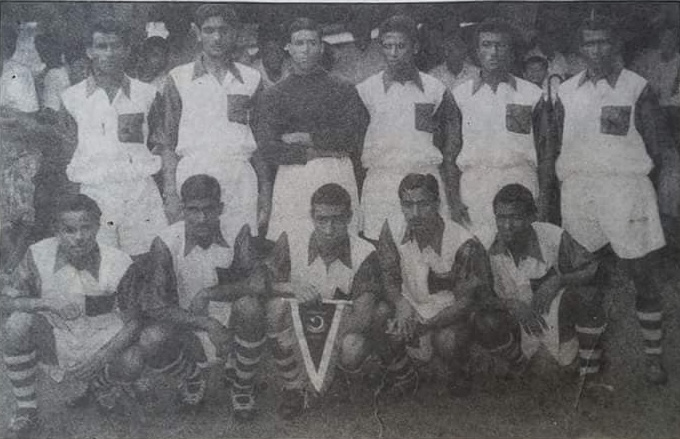
Siddiq (standing third from left) with the Pakistan national team, c. 1959

Siddiq represented the Pakistan national team as a regular starter from 1958 till 1961.

After impressing national team selector and coach John McBride, he was included as of the goalkeepers of the squad along with East Pakistani Manzur Hasan Mintu for the 1958 Asian Games held in Tokyo, Japan.

The next year, he toured Burma with the national team, where his fellow goalkeeper was Raza from Karachi. The same year, he featured at the 1960 AFC Asian Cup qualification held in Kochi, India.

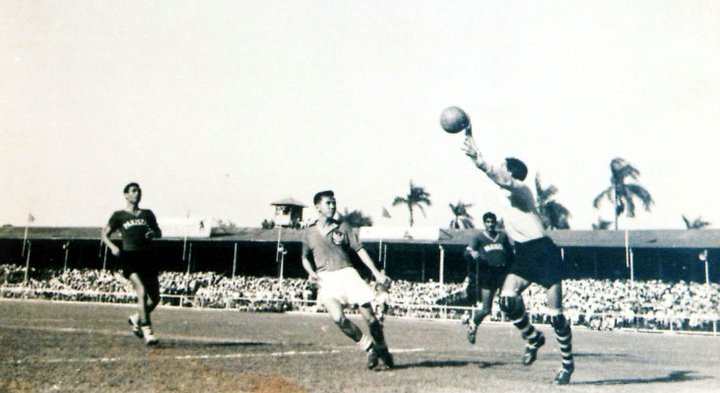
Siddiq stopping a shot during a friendly match against Indonesia in 1960

The next year, he featured at the 1960 Merdeka Tournament in Malaya, and at post-tournament friendlies. He last represented the national team in 1961, when Burma toured East Pakistan for friendly matches.

== Personal life ==
After his retirement as player, Siddiq worked as teacher in a school in Quetta. On 14 February 2017, at the age of 84, Siddiq was handed a lifetime award in the yearly sport festival at the Sardar Bahadur Khan Women's University by Muhammad Khan Achakzai, the Governor of Balochistan.

== Honours ==
Balochistan

- National Football Championship: 1956, 1959
