= Saint Placid's School and College =

School in Chittagong, Bangladesh

Location
- Chittagong; Bangladesh; 22.3333°N 91.8390°E

Information
- Former name: Bandel Catholic Free School
- Religious affiliation: Catholic Church
- Established: 1853; 173 years ago
- Founders: Anglo Belgian Benedictines
- Principal: Bro. Samuel Sabuj Bala, CSC
- Faculty: 78
- Enrollment: 3200+ (2026)
- Website: School Website

Saint Placid's School and College (SPSC) is a Catholic secondary school run by the Congregation of Holy Cross in Chittagong, Bangladesh. It was founded by the Anglo Belgian Benedictines in 1853. As of 2026, it had a faculty of 78 to teach more than 3000 students.

== History ==
The school was founded in 1853 as Bandel Catholic Free School by the Anglo Belgian Benedictines. Two years later it was transferred to the Congregation of Holy Cross. It was renamed St. Placid's School in 1883, after a Benedictine Saint of the 6th century.

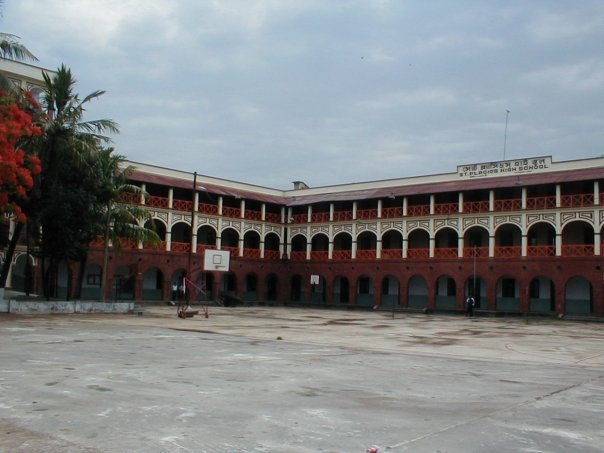
View of SPHSC

Saint Placid's is one of many English medium schools that were started by Christian missionaries during the time of the British rule. The schools were used to educate the Christian community of the regions they served to give them the advantages of education in the British ruled Indian subcontinent. They were also used to promote the conversion of people to Christianity especially from the poor who saw the schools as an added benefit for their children. Throughout their history though, these schools also took in students who were the children of the wealthy who could afford the fees that were charged to non-Christians. These students may have formed the majority and also provided income to the schools. After independence, the schools remained and adapted to the new countries they served (India, Pakistan and later Bangladesh as it became independent of Pakistan). They catered more and more to the children of the emerging middle class and also had a secular public front that was aligned with the religious sensitivities of the local people. At St. Placid's in the 1960s for example, the day started with the national anthem at assembly and when the students reached their "home room" they recited the Lord's Prayer, which was deemed consistent with both Muslim and Christian beliefs.

Throughout recent history, the success of such schools was due in part to what the educated classes saw as the failure of the public education system. St. Placid's as well as similar schools filled the gap between what was seen by the educated and affluent members of society as the best education for obtaining the most desirable jobs in the government and business, and what the public education offered.

As of 2026, principal Samuel Sabuj Bala heads 78 teachers instructing more than 3,200 pupils.

== Curriculum ==
St. Placid's School and College converted to Bengali medium shortly after the country became independent Bangladesh.

== Notable alumni ==
- Asif Iqbal - lyricist, music composer and corporate personality
- Shantanu Biswas (25 October 1954 – 12 July 2019), dramatist, playwright, singer-songwriter
- Abdul Mannan, Chairman, University Grants Commission of Bangladesh (2015-2019)
- Aftab Ahmad, Vice-Chancellor, National University of Bangladesh (2003-2005)
- Saifuzzaman Chowdhury Javed, Member Parliament, Minister, Government of Bangladesh
- George Macwa (1931 – December 1998), Footballer, East Pakistan football team, Kolkata Mohammedan
