= Wajeed Ali Miazi =

Bangladeshi footballer (1925–2000)

Wajeed Ali
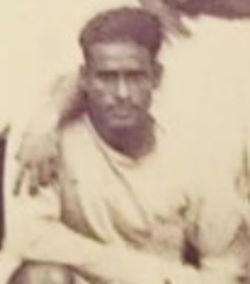
- Miazi in 1954

Personal information
- Full name: Wajeed Ali Miazi
- Date of birth: 25 November 1925
- Place of birth: Dacca, Bengal, British India (present-day Bangladesh)
- Date of death: 11 August 2000 (aged 74)
- Place of death: Dhaka, Bangladesh
- Position: Goalkeeper

Senior career*
| Years | Team | Apps | (Gls) |
| 1939–1944 | Dhaka Wanderers | | |
| 1945–1946 | Kolkata Mohammedan | | |
| 1947–1963 | Dhaka Wanderers | | |

International career
| 1956 | Pakistan | | |
- * Club domestic league appearances and goals

Wajeed Ali Miazi (Bengali: ওয়াজিদ আলী মিয়াজি; 25 November 1925 – 11 August 2000), alternatively spelled Wazed Ali Miyazi, was a Bangladeshi football player, coach and sports administrator.

== Early life ==
Miazi was born on 25 November 1925 in Dacca of Bengal, British India. His interest in football grew during his school days. He initially played as a central forward in local school tournaments before shifting to goalkeeping after earning a chance to practice with First Division clubs Victoria SC and Dhaka Mohammedan.

== Club career ==
In 1939, Miazi began playing for Dhaka Wanderers Club in the Second Division, and in the same year the club would gain promotion to the First Division as league champions. Aside from the domestic league, Miazi also represented the Wanderers in the Ronaldshay Shield, and was part of the team which reached the tournament semi-finals in 1944. In the same year, he represented Victoria SC as a guest player in the IFA Shield in West Bengal and attracted interest from many Calcutta-based clubs.

In 1945, Miazi joined Kolkata Mohammedan and spent two years in West Bengal prior to the partition of India, following which he returned to Dhaka Wanderers. He led the Wanderers as captain from 1947 to 1948. Apart from a two-year break from 1952 to 1953, Miazi represented Wanderers until 1963, during which he won the First Division six times and also represented the club in the IFA Shield in both 1954 and 1955.

Aside from club football, Miazi also represented East Bengal Governor XI against the West Bengal Governor XI in an Inter-Dominion exhibition match held in Dhaka on 19 September 1949, during which his team lost 1–4. The Indian team included majority of the players that represented India in the 1948 Summer Olympics in Great Britain, notable among them were Talimeren Ao and Sheoo Mewalal, the latter scoring a brace past Miazi. In the second exhibition match, held a day later, Miazi was replaced by Khan Mozlish, as his team lost 0–1. Miazi represented the East Pakistan football team from 1951 to 1956 and served as captain in the 1956 National Football Championship.

== International career ==
Initially called up to the Pakistan national team in 1955, Miazi withdrew due to an injury. From August to September 1956, Pakistan toured Ceylon, Singapore and China. Prior to the team's visit to Singapore, first-choice goalkeeper, Fazalur Rehman sustained an injury which ruled him out of the tour, leading the PFF to call up Miazi as a back-up goalkeeper. During their tour of China, Miazi featured for Pakistan in a 2–2 against Shanghai XI on 24 September 1956.

== Sports administration ==
Miazi served as the secretary of Dhaka Wanderers Club from 1949 to 1950 while also playing actively for the club. He was the club's joint secretary from 1951 to 1960, general secretary from 1961 to 1965, and vice president from 1966 to 1976. He returned as general secretary in 1977 and served until 1980. Notably, he resigned from the club's executive committee in 1969, citing his disdain for club politics. From 1947 to 1975, Miazi also served as the club's head coach, and at times acted as an assistant to Abdur Rahim.

Beyond Dhaka Wanderers, he worked as an assistant secretary and a member of the Football Selection Committee of the East Pakistan Sports Federation (EPSF) from 1958 to 1963. Following his departure, he became a vocal critic of the federation's mismanagement. In 1957, he managed the East Pakistan Whites team, which finished as runners-up in the National Football Championship in Dhaka. He later served as the associate manager of the Pakistan men's national basketball team during their 1964 tour of Ceylon. Miazi was also a member of the ad hoc committee of the Bangladesh Football Federation (BFF) in both 1976 and 1979 and the team leader of the Bangladesh national team during the 1980 AFC Asian Cup qualifiers in Dhaka.

== Death ==
Miazi died on 11 August 2000, following long-term illness. Miazi was married and had ten children, five sons and five daughters.

== Honours ==
Dhaka Wanderers Club

- Dhaka First Division League: 1950, 1951, 1954, 1955, 1956, 1960
- Independence Day Tournament: 1955

Individual

- 1979 − National Sports Award
