= Fazlur Rahman Arzu =

Bangladeshi footballer and coach

- Arzu, post-retirement

Personal information
- Full name: Mohamed Fazlur Rahman Arzu
- Date of birth: 31 March 1928
- Place of birth: Narayanganj, Bengal, British India
- Date of death: 22 March 2016 (aged 87)
- Place of death: Chittagong, Bangladesh
- Height: 1.58 m (5 ft 2 in)
- Position: Right-half

Senior career*
Years	Team	Apps	(Gls)
1949	EP Gymkhana		
1950–1952	Wari Club		
1953–1955	Dhaka Wanderers		
1956–1958	Mohammedan		

International career
1955	East Pakistan		
1955	Pakistan	1	(0)
- * Club domestic league appearances and goals

Fazlur Rahman Arzu (Bengali: ফজলুর রহমান আরজু; 31 March 1928 – 22 March 2016), alternatively spelled Fazlur Rahman Arzoo, was a Bangladeshi football player and coach. He was one of the few East Pakistani players to have represented the Pakistan national football team.

== Early career ==
Arzu was born in Duptara Union, Araihazar Upazila in Narayanganj District of Bengal on 31 March 1928. His football career began with inter-school tournaments, and in 1946, he represented Dhaka College in the Inter-College Football Tournament. He studied at Haraganga College, Munshiganj in 1947-1948 and participated in various local knockout football tournaments.

== Club career ==
In 1948, Arzu began representing the Dhaka Salimullah Muslim Hall football team in Inter-hall and in the Inter-college tournaments. In the same year, he began playing in the Dhaka First Division Football League with promotees, East Pakistan Gymkhana. That year, Gymkhana won the league title, while Arzu also went on win the Independence Day Football Tournament while representing Dhaka University. In the final his team defeated Dhaka City XI 2–1.

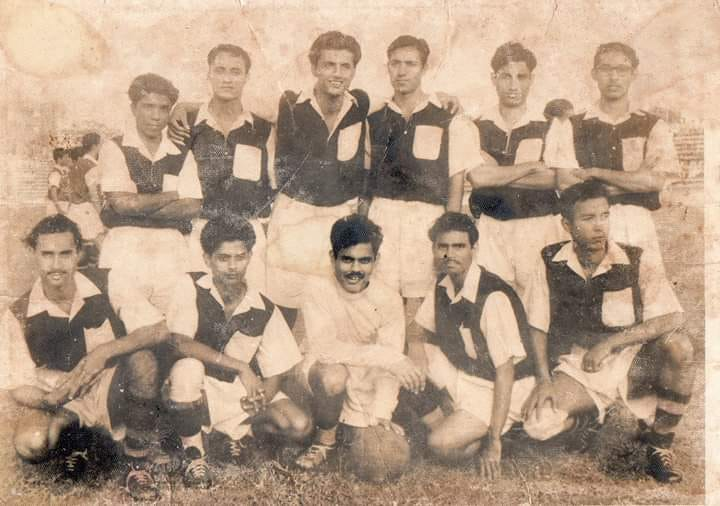
Arzu (captain) standing first from left with Mohammedan Sporting Club in 1956.

From 1951 to 1952, Arzu represented Chittagong Mohammedan in the Chittagong First Division Football League, and won the league title. In 1952, Arzu won the Inter-District Football Tournament while representing Chittagong District. In the same year, Arzu participated in the IFA Shield held in West Bengal, with Wari Club. He again participated in tournament in 1954 and 1955 with Dhaka Wanderers. He also won the First Division League title five times in between 1952 and 1956 with the Wanderers.

Arzu also represented the East Pakistan football team in the National Football Championship in all five editions from 1953 to 1957. In 1956, Arzu along with numerous teammates from Dhaka Wanderers, including Amir Jang Ghaznavi, Ashraf Chowdhury and Kabir Ahmed joined Dhaka Mohammedan. He was the club captain that year, as Mohammedan finished runners-up in the league behind the Wanderers. The following year, the club won its maiden First Division League title. Arzu played league football until 1958, and in the same year, participated in the Aga Khan Gold Cup with Azad Sporting Club.

== International career ==
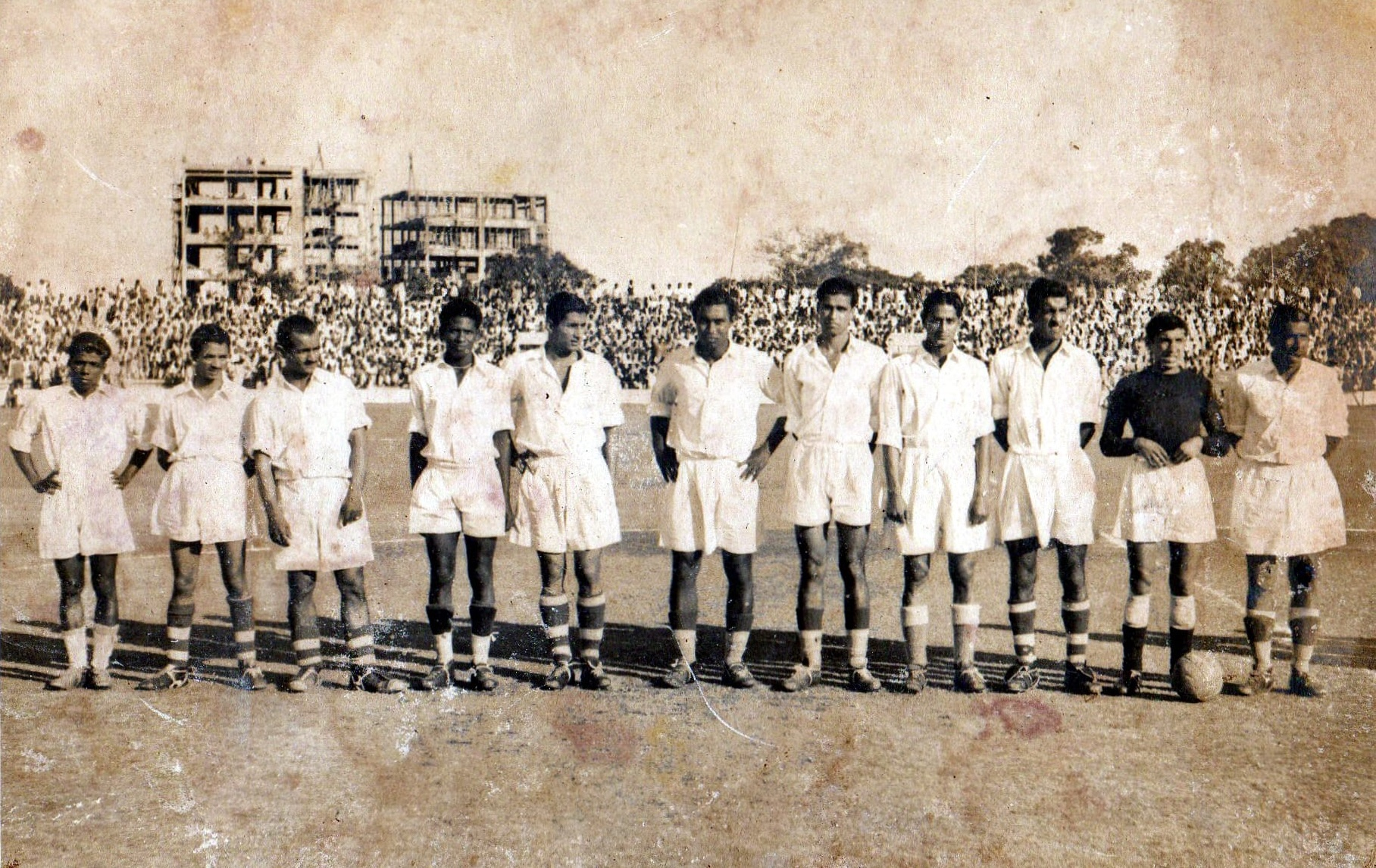
Arzu standing first from left with Pakistan before their friendly match against India in 1955.

On 14 December 1955, Arzu represented East Pakistan in an exhibition match against the Pakistan national team. Although his team were defeated 1–3, Arzu was eventually included in the Pakistan national team in the 1955 Asian Quadrangular Football Tournament held in Dacca, East Pakistan (now Bangladesh). However, he did not make an appearance in the tournament, and eventually made his debut in an exhibition match held against India after the tournament's conclusion, which Pakistan won 1–0.

== Retirement ==
Arzu found employment in the Chittagong Customs and also represented their football team in the Chittagong First Division Football League. He later held positions of general secretary and coach of the Chittagong Customs Sports Club. He eventually worked as a volunteer football coach for Bangladesh Krira Shikkha Protishtan (BKSP), Fauzdarhat Cadet College, Chittagong Naval Base, and the Chittagong Cantonment football team.

He served as a member of the ad hoc committee of the Bangladesh Football Federation (BFF) in 1979 and 1980. He was also an executive member of the Chittagong District Sports Council. In 1979, he served as the joint-mangaer of the Bangladesh national team in the 1980 AFC Asian Cup qualification held in Dhaka, Bangladesh. He eventually received the National Sports Awards in 1979, a silver shield from the Narayanganj Sports Association, and an award and blazer from the Chittagong District Sports Council.

== Death ==
He died on 22 March 2016 at his Halishahar Thana residence in Chittagong from old-age complications.

== Honours ==
Dhaka University

- Independence Day Football Tournament: 1949

East Pakistan Gymkhana

- Dhaka First Division League: 1949

Dhaka Wanderers

- Dhaka First Division League: 1953, 1954, 1955, 1956

Dhaka Mohammedan

- Dhaka First Division League: 1957

East Pakistan White

- National Football Championship runner-up: 1957

Individual

- 1979 − National Sports Awards.
