= Bashir Ahmed (field hockey, born 1941) =

Bangladeshi athlete

- বশির আহমেদ
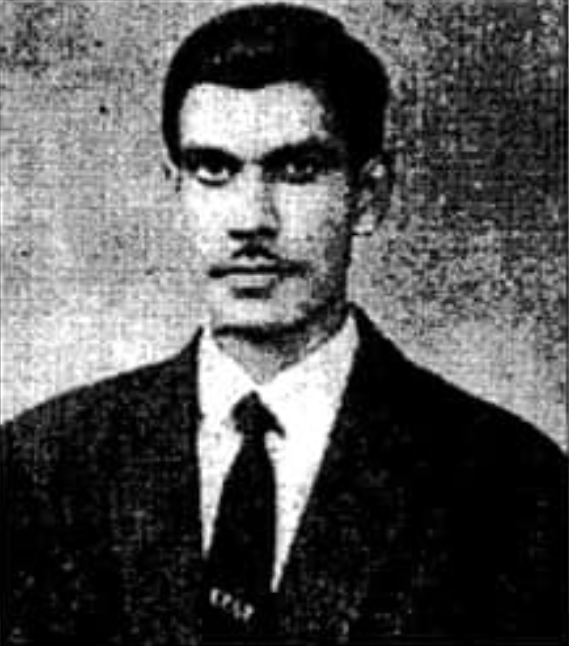
- Bashir in 1962
- Born: 1941 (age 84–85); Dhaka, Bengal Province, British India
- Education: University of Dhaka
- Field hockey career
- Sport: Field hockey
- Position: Right-out, Left-in
Senior career
Years	Team	Caps	Goals
1957–1962	Victoria SC	-	-
1963–1970	National Bank of Pakistan	-	-
1971–1976	Sonali Bank	-	-
National team
Years	Team	Caps	Goals
1960–1967	East Pakistan		-
1962	Pakistan		-
Coaching career
- 1977–1978: Dhaka Mohammedan
- 1978: Bangladesh
- 1982: Bangladesh women
Association football career
- Position: Winger
Senior career*
Years	Team	Apps	(Gls)
1956	Dhaka SC		
1957–1962	Victoria SC		
1963–1967	Dhaka Mohammedan		
International career
1959–1963	East Pakistan		
- * Club domestic league appearances and goals

Bashir Ahmed (born 1941) is a retired Bangladeshi international field hockey player and is the first Bengali player to represent the Pakistan men's national field hockey team. He was also a prominent football player and referee.

== Early life ==
Bashir Ahmed was born in Mahut-tuli area in Dhaka. He studied in Armanitola Government High School. After he enrolled in the University of Dhaka, he took part in field hockey, football, cricket and athletics. He was an active sportsman during the late '50s and '60s. The Dhaka clubs he played for included Mohammedan Sporting, Victoria Sporting, Brothers Union and National Bank of Pakistan (now Sonali Bank).

== Field hockey career ==
=== National Hockey Championship ===
Bashir represented East Pakistan in the National Hockey Championship for several years. He was also a member of the East Pakistan Sports Federation's hockey team that won its only match in the history of the championship. This match against Pakistan Navy was played at Karachi on 1 April 1967.

=== International matches ===
In 1962, Bashir played two international matches from the Pakistan field hockey team against visiting foreign hockey teams, becoming the first Bengali player to do so. The games were played against teams of Kenya and Holland. Both of these matches were played at Dacca, where Bashir played at right-out position.

=== Coaching and umpiring ===
Bashir was the head coach of the Bangladesh men's national field hockey team at the 1978 Asian Games in Bangkok, Thailand. He coached Dhaka Mohammedan to the 1977-78 Dhaka Hockey First Division League title. In 1982, Bashir served as the coach of the first ever Bangladesh women. He was also an international hockey umpire and umpired in both the 1985 Men's Hockey Asia Cup and the 1989 Men's Hockey Asia Cup.

== Football career ==
=== Playing career ===
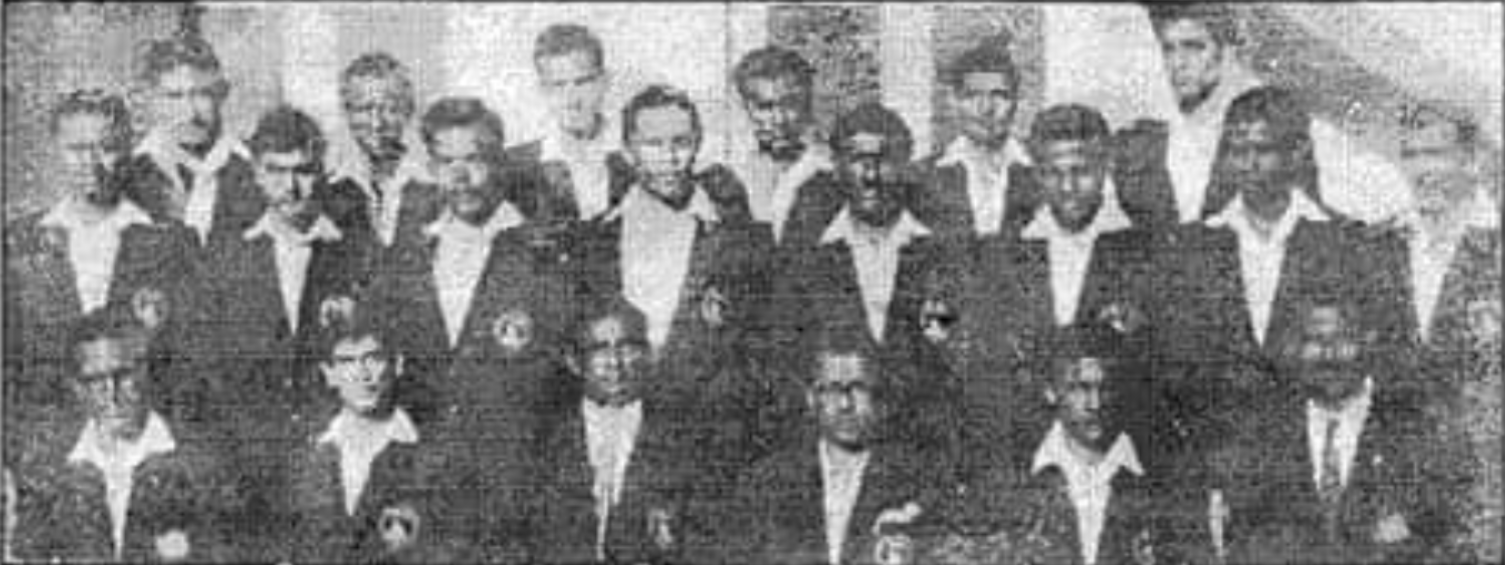
Bashir sitting second from left with the 1961 National Football Championship-winning Dhaka Division team.

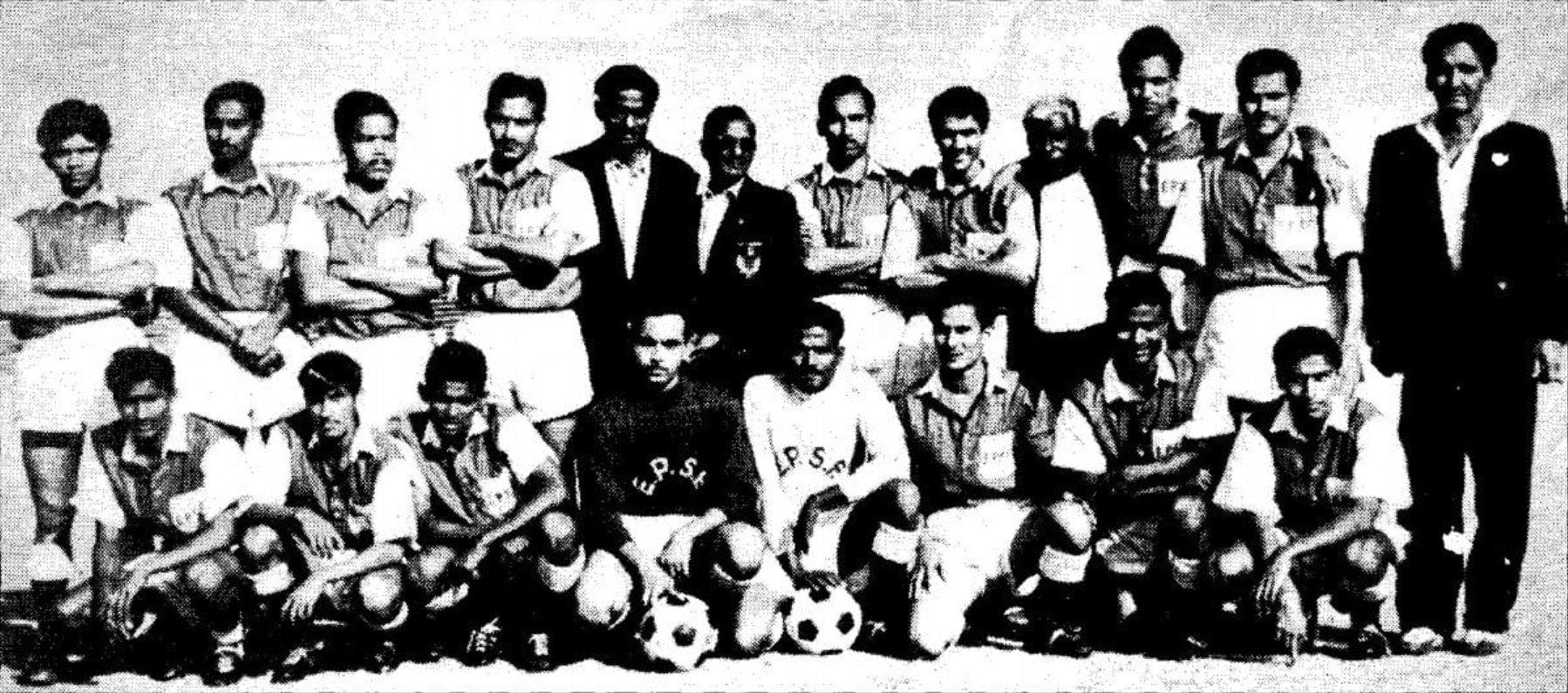
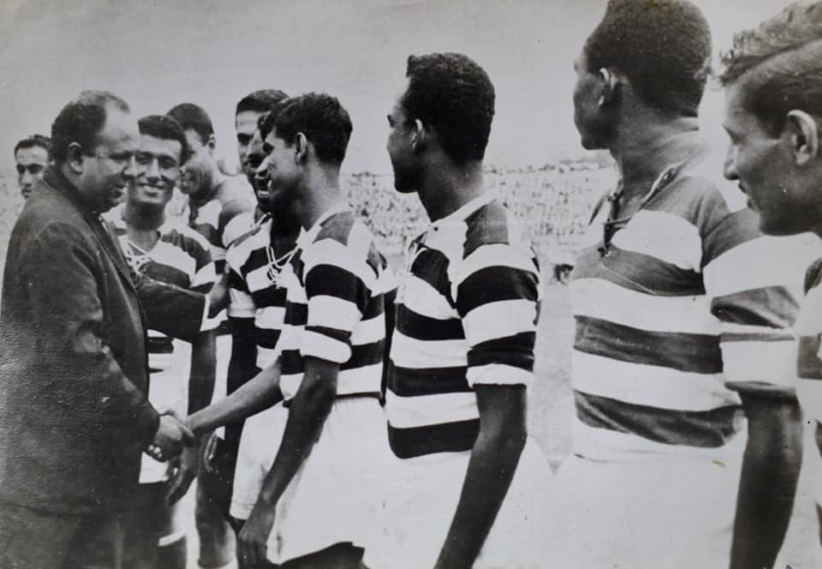
Bashir sitting second from left with the East Pakistan football team in 1963 before an exhibition game against China (above), shaking hands with Minister A.T.M Mustafa (below) prior to an exhibition game against Fortuna Düsseldorf.

Bashir began his football career with Dhaka SC in the Second Division League. In 1962, he won three titles with Victoria SC, including the First Division, Aga Khan Gold Cup, and Independence Day Tournament. In 1959, he was a guest player for the Dhaka Mohammedan team, which became the first East Pakistani club to lift the Aga Khan Gold Cup. He represented East Pakistan at the National Football Championship in 1958, 1959, and 1960, emerging as champions in the latter.

In 1959, Bashir represented EPSF XI in two exhibition matches against the Pakistan national team. The first game held on 18 April, ended in a 0–7 defeat, while the second match on 14 May, saw EPSF XI suffer a 1–2 defeat. Bashir was the vice-captain of Dhaka Division during their National Championship triumph in 1961–62. In 1961 and 1963, Bashir represented East Pakistan in exhibition games against Burma and China, scoring during a 1–11 defeat to China in a game held at the Dhaka Stadium on 24 January 1963. In June 1963, he represented the East Pakistan Sports Federation XI during an exhibition match against Germany's Bundesliga club Fortuna Düsseldorf in Dhaka. He also represented the football teams of both Dhaka University and Jagannath College from 1952 to 1967.

=== Refereeing career ===
Bashir was a referee in domestic football. In 2008, he served as the chairman of Bangladesh Football Federation's Referees' Committee.

== Honours ==
=== Hockey ===
Victoria SC

- Atiqullah Cup: 1958

National Bank of Pakistan

- Pakistan Hockey League: 1963–64, 1966–67

Sonali Bank

- Shaheed Smriti Hockey Tournament: 1976

Dhaka Mohammedan

- Dhaka Hockey First Division League: 1977–78 (as coach)

=== Football ===
Victoria SC

- Dhaka First Division League: 1962
- Aga Khan Gold Cup: 1962
- Independence Day Football Tournament: 1962

Dhaka Mohammedan

- Dhaka First Division League: 1963, 1965, 1966
- Aga Khan Gold Cup: 1959 (guest player), 1964
- Independence Day Football Tournament: 1963, 1966
- All-Pakistan Mohammad Ali Bogra Memorial Football Tournament: 1966
- Liaquat Ali Gold Cup: 1967

East Pakistan

- National Football Championship: 1960

Dhaka Division

- National Football Championship: 1961–62

Jagannath College

- Ronaldshay Shield: 1962

== Awards and accolades ==
- Best Sportsperson Award by the East Pakistan Sports Press Association (1966)
- National Sports Award (1980) in field hockey
- Grameenphone-Prothom Alo Lifetime Achievement Award (2008)
- Star Lifetime Award (2016)

== Bibliography ==
- Mahmud, Dulal (2020). খেলার মাঠে মুক্তিযুদ্ধ (transl. Liberation war in the playground) (in Bengali). Bishhoshahitto Bhobon. ISBN 978-984-8218-31-0.
- Alam, Masud (2017). ফুটবলের গল্প ফুটবলারদের গল্প (transl. The story of football the story of footballers) (in Bengali). Bishhoshahitto Bhobon. ISBN 9789849134688.
- Mahmud, Noman (2018). ফুটবল পায়ে মুক্তির যুদ্ধ (transl. Liberation war fought by football) (in Bengali). Agamee Prakashani. ISBN 978-984-8218-31-0.
