= Nazir Ahmed Chowdhury =

Bangladeshi footballer

Nazir Ahmed
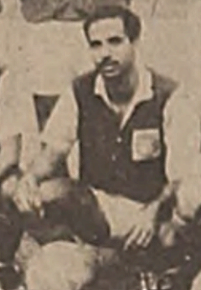
- Nazir with EPIDC in 1970

Personal information
- Full name: Nazir Ahmed Chowdhury
- Place of birth: Sunamganj, East Pakistan (present-day Bangladesh)
- Position: Center-back

Youth career
- 1964: Sunamganj Brothers

Senior career*
Years	Team	Apps	(Gls)
1966	EP Railway		
1967	Central Stationary		
1968	EPG Press		
1969	Wari		
1970–1977	BJMC		
1977–1978	WAPDA		
1979	Shadharan Bima		

International career
1970	East Pakistan		
1973–1975	Bangladesh		
- * Club domestic league appearances and goals

Nazir Ahmed Chowdhury (Bengali: নাজির আহমেদ চৌধুরী), better known as Nazir Junior or Choto Nazir, is a retired Bangladeshi footballer who played as a center-back. He is a member of the first Bangladesh national football team.

== Early life ==
Nazir Ahmed Chowdhury was born in Sunamganj, East Pakistan (present-day Bangladesh). Alongside football he was also involved with athletics, he was the divisional champion in 400 meters race. In 1964, Nazir started playing football with Sunamganj Brothers and his school team. In the same year, the Sunamganj Government School won the title in inter-departmental games, and Nazir was called up to the Sunamganj divisional team, however, he played for them the following year as he was still a student at the time. In 1965, Nazir won the Sunamganj First Division title, earning him a chance to join East Pakistan Railway in the Dhaka First Division League.

== Club career ==
In Nazir's debut season in the First Division, East Pakistan Railway were relegated to the Second Division. The following season, he joined Central Stationary in the First Division, however, his team were once again relegated. In 1968, Nazir remained in the top-tier with EPG Press. In 1970, Nazir found a long-term address, in EPIDC. With the Jutemen, Nazir became league champions in both 1970 and 1973, the latter being the first complete domestic football season after the Independence of Bangladesh. Following BJMC's (formerly EPIDC) title triumph in 1973, Nazir was named the Sports Writers Association's Best Footballer. Although Sheikh Kamal attempted to bring him to Abahani Krira Chakra, Nazir remained loyal to BJMC, and eventually retired in 1979, while playing for Sadharan Bima CSC.

== International career ==
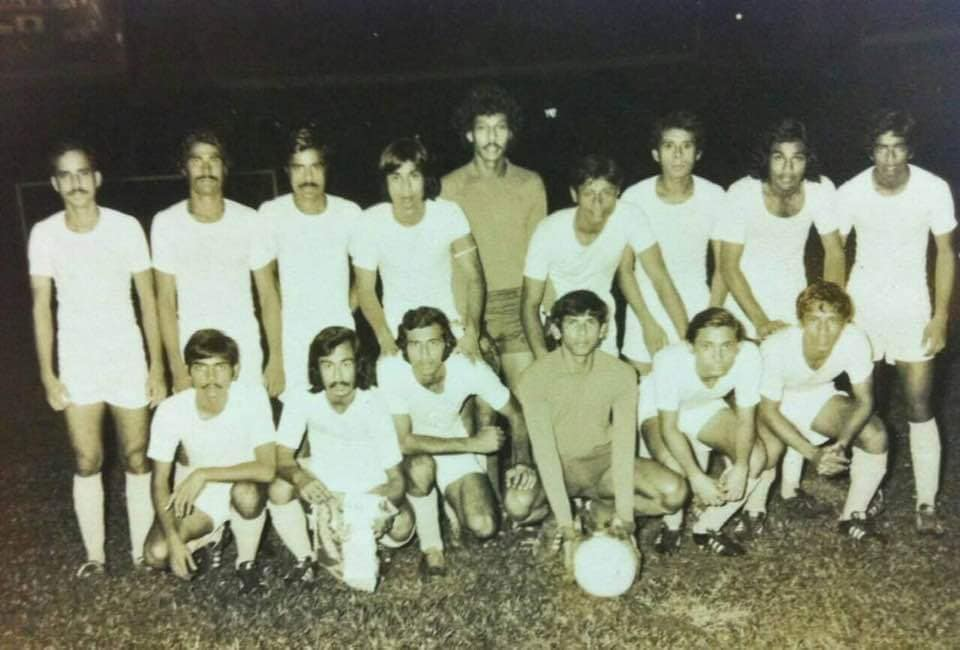
Nazir (standing first from left) with Bangladesh at the 1975 Merdeka Tournament in Malaysia.

In 1970, Nazir won the King Mahendra Cup tournament in Nepal with East Pakistan. In the same year, he was called up to the trials for the Pakistan national team, nonetheless, he eventually failed to make the final squad. On 13 May 1972, Nazir played in an exhibition match for Dhaka XI against Indian giants Mohun Bagan, who were the first foreign club to play in Bangladesh following its independence. Nazir played an integral role in defense alongside captain Zakaria Pintoo, as they defeated the visitors 1–0. In the same year, he participated in the Bordoloi Trophy with the team. The following year, he was called up to the first Bangladesh national football team by head coach Sheikh Shaheb Ali. With the national team, he participated in the 1973 and 1975 editions of Malaysia's Medeka Cup. On 27 July 1973, he made his international debut in the Merdeka Cup against Thailand, in what was Bangladesh's maiden international match. In the latter stages of 1973, he sustained a serious injury while playing for Dhaka XI against the visiting Dinamo Minsk from the Soviet Union.

== Nickname ==
Nazir earned the nickname Choto Nazir, which translates to "Small Nazir" in Bengali, due to his much senior former teammate and Team BJMC striker Nazir Ahmed Senior or Boro Nazir, the latter translates to "Big Nazir" in Bengali.

== Honours ==
Team BJMC

- Dhaka First Division League: 1970, 1973
- Independence Cup: 1975

East Pakistan

- King Mahendra Cup: 1970

=== Awards and accolades ===
- 1973 − Sports Writers Association's Best Footballer Award

== Bibliography ==
- Alam, Masud (2017). ফুটবলের গল্প ফুটবলারদের গল্প (transl. The story of football the story of footballers) (in Bengali). Bishhoshahitto Bhobon. ISBN 9789849134688.
