= East Pakistan football team =

Association football team

East Pakistan
- Emblem of East Pakistan
- Founded: 1948
- Dissolved: 1971
- Ground: Dacca Stadium
- Association: EPSF

The East Pakistan football team (Bengali: পূর্ব পাকিস্তান ফুটবল দল) was a provincial team operated by the East Pakistan Sports Federation (EPSF) and represented East Pakistan in national and international matches from 1948 till the Independence of Bangladesh in 1971, which led to the eventual formation of the Bangladesh national football team.

The team participated in the National Football Championship from 1948 to 1960, becoming champions in their final year, after which the EPSF began sending divisional teams to the tournament. East Pakistan won their maiden international trophy in 1970, the King Mahendra Cup in Kathmandu, Nepal, during which they also played their final competitive games, as the team was dissolved during the Bangladesh Liberation War. Apart from East Pakistanis, the team often included players from West Pakistan, who, at the time, participated in the Dhaka First Division League. This contributed significantly to their success.

== History ==
The East Pakistan football team traces its origins back to 1948, when a team from the province of East Bengal was invited to take part in the inaugural Inter-Provincial Football Tournament, which would later be known as the National Football Championship. In 1951, the East Pakistan Sports Federation (EPSF), now known as the National Sports Council, was merged with the East Pakistan Sports Association (EPSA) and began acting as the province's primary sports body. Habibullah Bahar Chowdhury and Siddikur Rahman served as the reintroduced organizations first president and general secretary, respectively. The East Pakistan football team became a provincial member under the EPSF, which formed teams to participate in the National Football Championship, exhibition games, and international invitation tournaments.

=== Teams ===
| Team | Formed | Note |
|---|---|---|
| East Bengal | 1948–55 | Main team |
| East Pakistan | 1956–71 | Main team |
| East Bengal Whites | 1952 | Formed for the 1952 National Football Championship in Dacca |
| East Bengal Green | 1952 | Formed for the 1952 National Football Championship in Dacca |
| East Pakistan Whites | 1957 | Formed for the 1957 National Football Championship in Dacca |
| East Pakistan Green | 1957 | Formed for the 1957 National Football Championship in Dacca |
| East Pakistan Sports Federation President's XI | 1957 | Formed for an exhibition match against Calcutta Mohammedan in Dacca |
| East Pakistan Sports Federation XI | 1963 | Formed for an exhibition match against Fortuna Düsseldorf in Dacca |

== National Championship record ==
=== 1948 Karachi; unknown ===
In April 1948, invitations were sent to East Bengal to field a team for the inaugural National Football Championship, held in Karachi in May of that year. However, it is unlikely that a team was ultimately sent, as the province lacked an established central sports governing body at the time, aside from district-level sports associations.

=== 1950 Quetta–1954 Lahore ===
The second National Football Championship was held in Quetta in September 1950. The provisionally selected squad played four friendly matches, including two goalless draws against Kolkata Mohammedan as the Dhaka XI and the Governor's XI on 31 August and 1 September in the provincial capital. Former Kolkata Mohammedan captain Abbas Mirza served as the Quetta-bound team's coach. The team won their first match against R.P.N. by 1–0 on 8 September, with Aminur Rahman Dhonu scoring in the 4th minute. Although much coverage isn't available, it is unlikely that the team progressed much further in the competition.

The third National Championship was scheduled to be held in Dacca, East Pakistan, starting on 10 September 1951. However, it was initially postponed and ultimately canceled a month prior due to the ongoing Kashmir conflict between India and Pakistan.

The following year, the East Pakistan Sports Federation (EPSF) successfully hosted the National Football Championship in Dacca from 16 February to 4 March 1952. For the first time, the EPSF fielded two teams: East Bengal White and East Bengal Green. The White team, captained by Amin Asad of Ispahani Club, exited the championship after a 0–6 defeat to Pakistan Military XI on the opening day at the EPSF Ground. The Green team began their campaign on 24 February after a significant delay. They reached the semi-finals after defeating the Sindh team 2–0 in their first match. Sindh defender Wahed opened the scoring with an own goal in the 28th minute, and Rashid Chunna sealed the victory in the latter stages of the game. The Green team eventually exited the tournament in the semi-final, losing 0–1 against North-West Frontier Province on 27 February. Hussaini scored the opponents lone goal in the1 17 minute of the second-half.

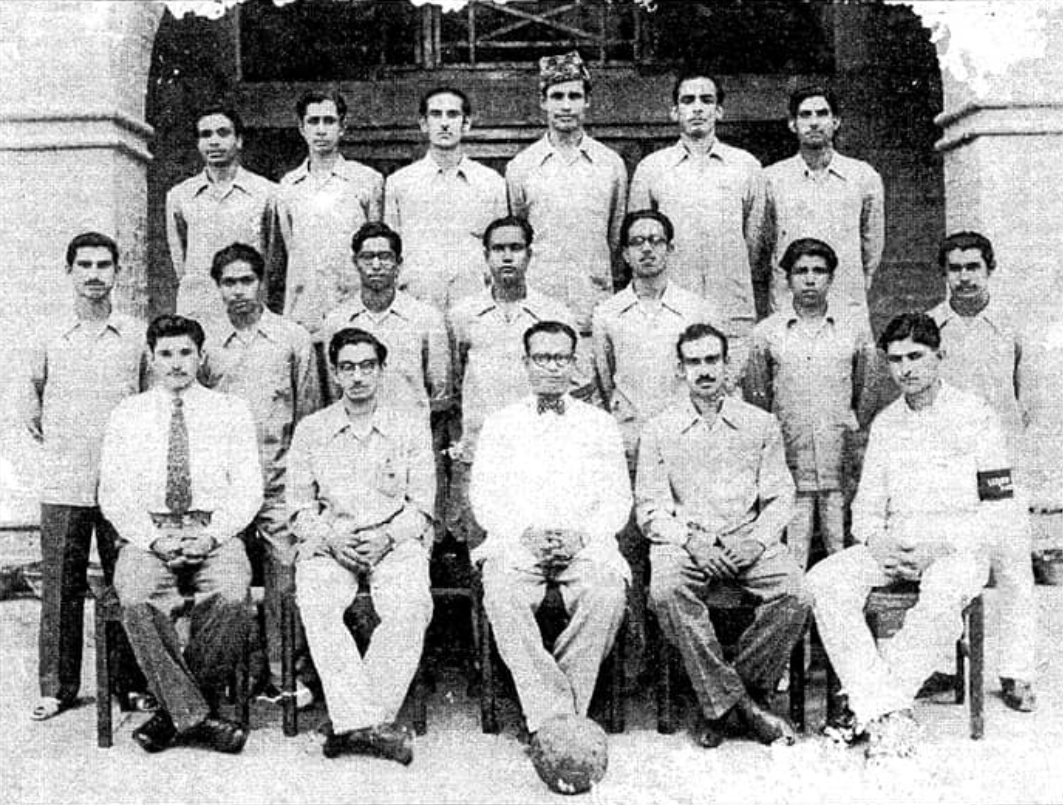
East Pakistan team at the 1953 National Championship in Peshawar

The East Bengal football team (also simultaneously mentioned as East Pakistan) also participated in the National Football Championship during the fourth edition of the tournament, held in Peshawar in 1953. Captained by K.A. Ansari, the team exited the championship after losing their opening match 1–6 to North-West Frontier Province White on 27 April. East Bengal's only goal was scored by Fazlu in the second half, when the team was already six goals down.

The following year, they toured Chittagong and played two exhibition matches in preparation for the fifth National Championship in Lahore. The team was coached by Mohammad Shahjahan and captained by Police Athletic Club's Anglo-Indian right-outside, Raushan Ali, better known as Robson. The team exited the competition after losing by an unknown margin in their first match against eventual champions Punjab Blue on 24 October.

=== 1955 Bahawalpur and 1956 Karachi ===
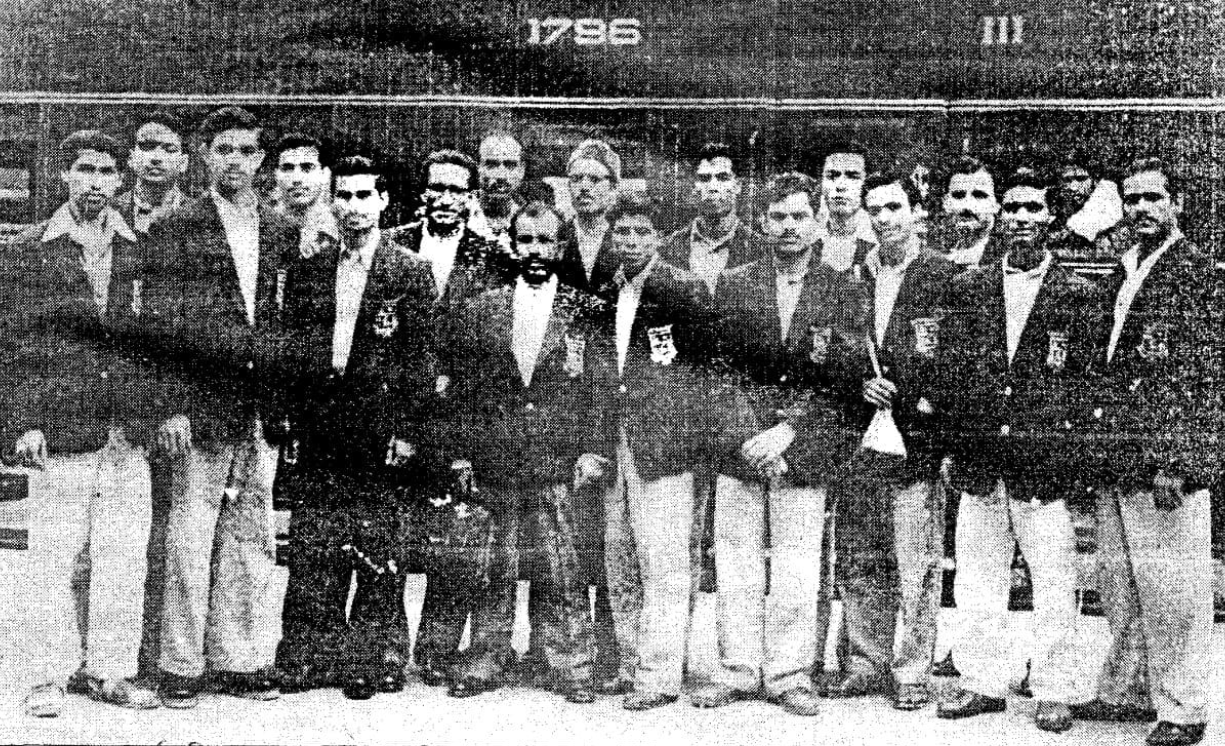
East Pakistan team pictured at the Dhaka railway station; bound for the 1955 National Championship in Bahawalpur

In the 1955 edition of the championship, held in Bahawalpur, East Bengal (also referred to as East Pakistan), captained by Pakistan national football team forward Rashid Chunna, the team received a bye from the first round and exited the tournament in the quarter-finals after losing 1–3 to Baluchistan in a replayed match on 21 November. The initial match on 20 November had ended before full time, with East Pakistan trailing 0–2. Iqbal scored twice, while Taj Muhammad Jr. added the third for Baluchistan, and Chunna netted the consolation goal for East Pakistan.

Following the One Unit Scheme, the team was effectively renamed as East Pakistan. In 1956, Wajeed Ali Miazi captained the team during the seventh National Championship in Karachi. The team began the tournament with a 4–2 victory over Bahawalpur on 26 October, reaching the quarter-finals. The team's goals came from braces by both Ashraf Chowdhury and Rashid Chunna. The team eventually exited in the quarter-finals, held on 28 October, losing 1–5 to Punjab, with Kabir Ahmed scoring their consolation goal.

=== 1957 Dacca; runners-up ===
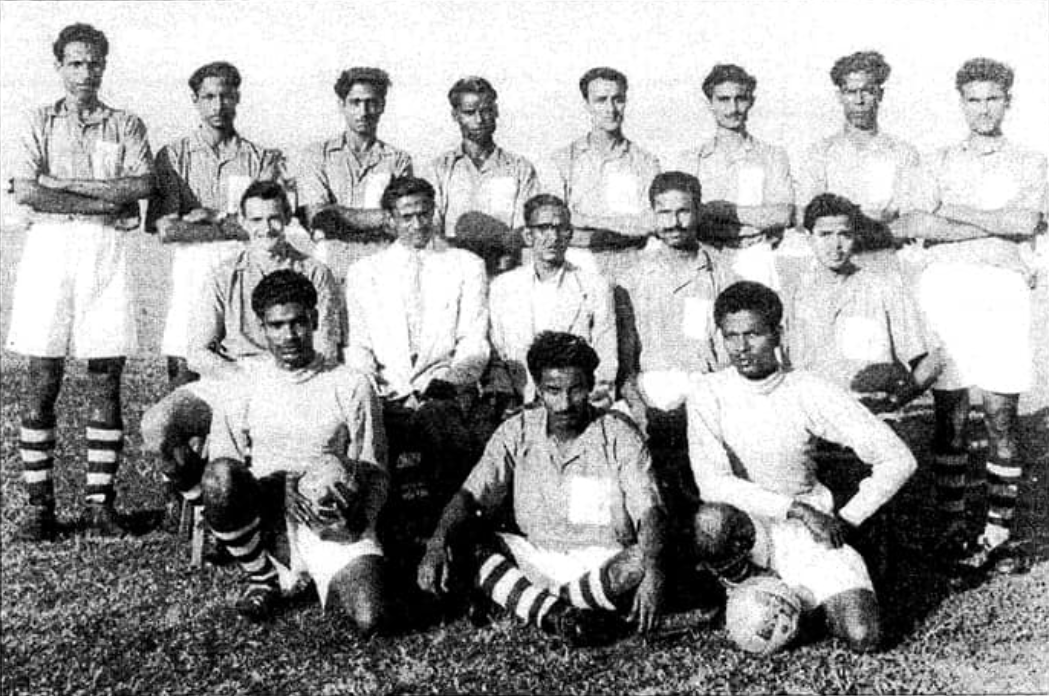
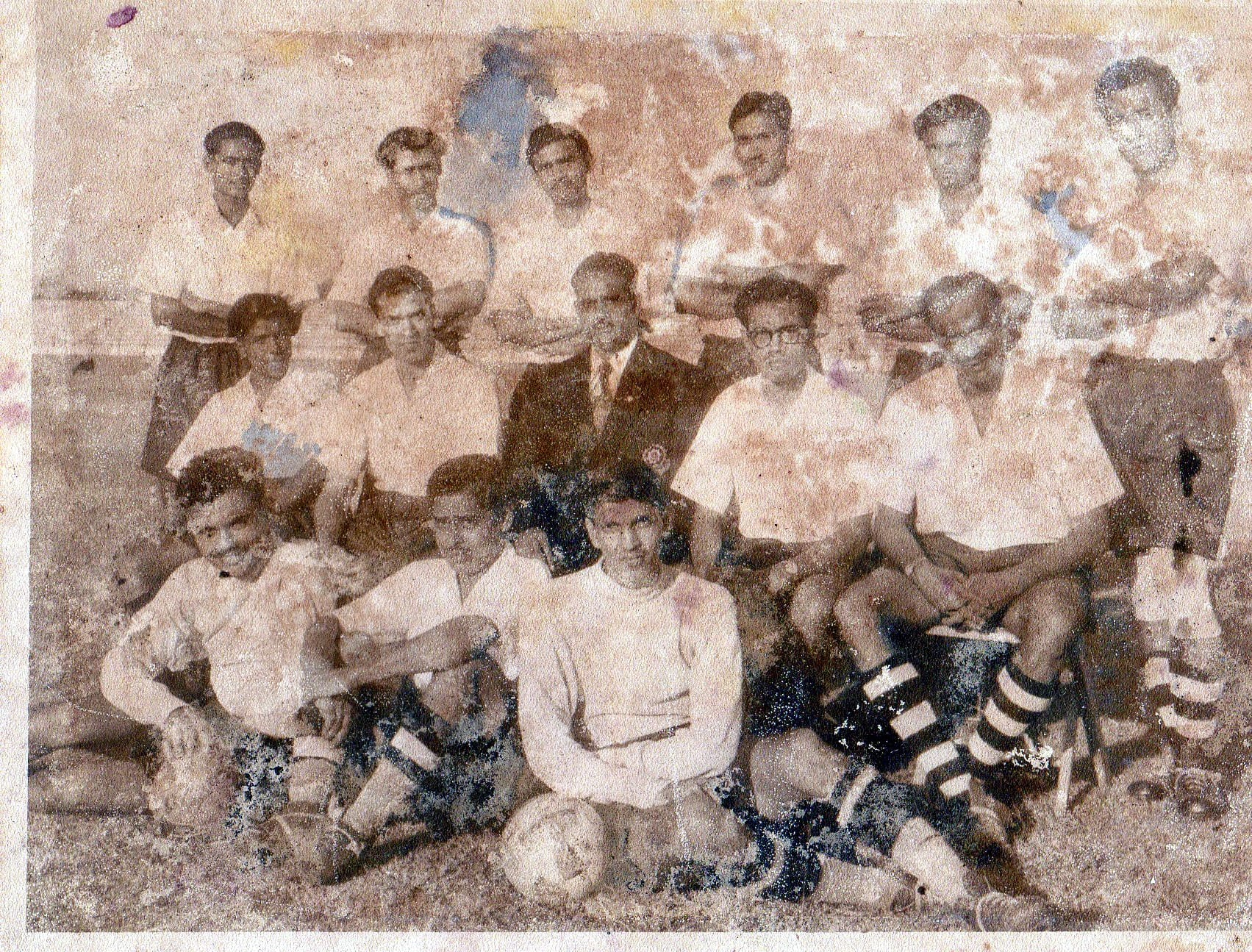
East Pakistan Green team (above), and the White team (below) at the 1957 National Championship in Dacca

On 17 June 1957, Ashraful Huq, the football secretary of the East Pakistan Sports Federation (EPSF) and the organizing secretary of the National Football Championship, confirmed that the eighth edition of the championship would be held in Dacca, the administrative capital of East Pakistan. The festive atmosphere leading up to the championship included free shows at local cinema halls for participating teams, as well as arranged trips to Adamjee Jute Mills and Cotton Mills in Narayanganj for the participants. After much delay due to many teams facing passport issues, the tournament began on 21 October.

Similar to 1952, the EPSF formed two teams to participate in the tournament: East Pakistan Whites and East Pakistan Greens. Khondkar Nasim Ahmed played a major role in the team selections. Notably, the tournament matches lasted a full 90 minutes, which was rare in the region at the time. Mari Chowdhury captained the Whites, while Sheikh Shaheb Ali led the Greens. The Green team was knocked out in the first round on 21 October, losing 1–4 to Pakistan Army. On 22 October, the East Pakistan Whites began the championship with a 5–2 victory over Pakistan Navy, with Ashraf Chowdhury scoring a hat-trick, while Nabi Chowdhury and Kabir Ahmed added the other goals. In the second round against Sindh on 26 October, the Whites won the game 5–0. The goals were scored by Rashid Chunna, Ashraf, and Mari, with the latter scoring three times.

In the semi-finals against Baluchistan on 3 November, Ashraf and Kabir scored in a 2–3 defeat. The loss on home turf led to local fans throwing stones at referee Mahmood Shah due to his alleged controversial decisions during the match. Police had to intervene and eventually retaliated. The governor of East Pakistan at the time, A. K. Fazlul Huq, was present at Dacca Stadium to witness the chaos. On 4 November, the East Pakistan government directed the Dacca Divisional Commissioner and the Deputy Inspector of Police in Dacca to conduct an inquiry into the clash, which resulted in seventy-seven people being injured, including fifty-four policemen. The semi-final was eventually replayed on 5 November, with the Whites winning 2–1.

In the final against favorites Punjab, held on 8 November, an unprecedented 80,000 local fans packed the stadium, with some even sitting inside the playing area, causing players from both teams to refuse to play, an exhibition match of 25 minutes per half was eventually held, during which the hosts' centre-forward, Ashraf, was injured. The match finally got underway on 10 November in front of 40,000 spectators, with S.A. Jamman Mukta replacing Ashraf, East Pakistan Whites lost 1–2, with Rashid Chunna scoring the team's only goal, and the chief minister of East Pakistan, Ataur Rahman Khan, handed over the prizes.

East Pakistan Whites XI: Ranjit, Ghaznavi, Eugene Gomes, Arzu, Nabi, Shamsu, Rashid Chunna, S.A. Jamman Mukta, Kabir, Mari (captain), Shah Alam.

Punjab XI: Sharafuddin, Riasat, Niamat, Shaukat, Masood ul Hassan, Naiir, Talib, Mazhar, Saif, Hanif, Rabbani.

The following year, six players from East Pakistan Whites were selected for the Pakistan national team bound for the Tokyo Asian Games, including Amir Jang Ghaznavi, Kabir Ahmed, Nabi Chowdhury, Mari Chowdhury, Ashraf Chowdhury, and Manzur Hasan Mintu.

=== 1958 Multan; quarter-finalist ===
In the ninth National Championship, held in Multan, the East Pakistan football team was captained by Nabi Chowdhury, who had earlier in the year also led the Pakistan national football team at the Tokyo Asian Games. The squad featured four other internationals: Manzur Hasan Mintu, Mari Chowdhury, Kabir Ahmed, and Abid Hussain Ghazi, the latter hailing from Karachi, West Pakistan. However, with leading striker Ashraf Chowdhury, the top scorer in the previous edition, absent due to injury, the inclusion of veteran Rashid Chunna, who had a poor domestic campaign, was criticised by the local newspapers. Prior to traveling to Multan, East Pakistan played a practice match on 6 November against a Selected XI comprising reserve and local league players, winning 5–2. Nevertheless, despite their strong lineup, they were eliminated from the tournament after a 1–3 defeat in their opening match against Punjab Reds, the junior side of reigning champions Punjab, on 15 November 1958. The loss was largely blamed on goalkeeper Ranjit Das, whose lack of height was said to have contributed to conceding the first two goals, while Rashid Chunna once again scored the lone consolation goal for East Pakistan.

=== 1959 Hyderabad; runners-up ===
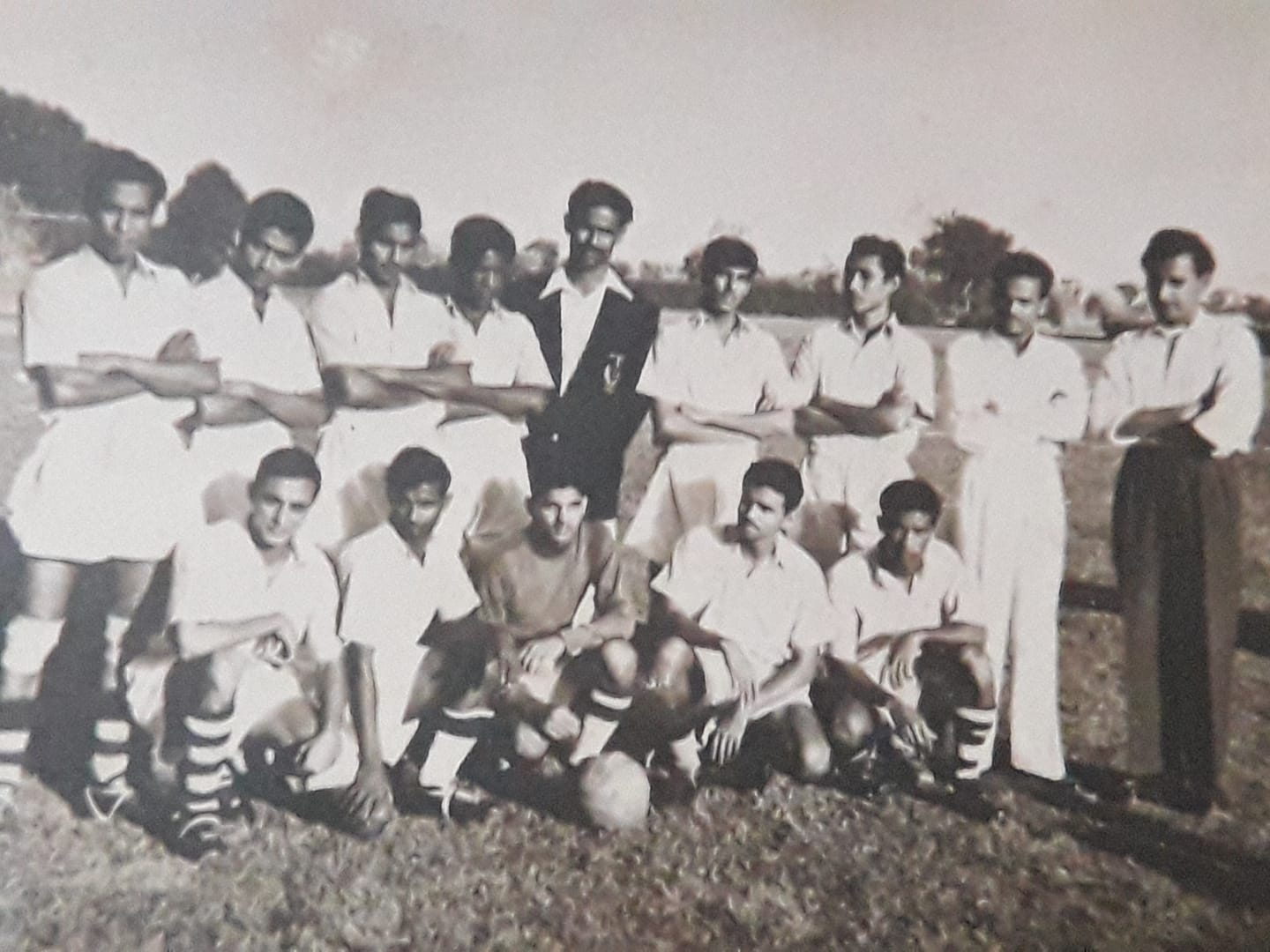
East Pakistan team at Montgomery, 1959

Prior to the tenth National Championship, held in Hyderabad, three trial matches were held at the Dacca Stadium by the EPSF selection committee from 27 to 30 October. Eventually, Sheikh Shaheb Ali, who had represented the team from 1948 to 1957, was appointed coach-cum-assistant manager of the final selected team, captained by Kabir Ahmed. In preparation for the championship, the team also toured Lahore, Montgomery, and Gujranwala in West Pakistan, where they played numerous exhibition matches.

On 13 October, East Pakistan played their first exhibition match in Lahore, defeating Carson Institute FC 4–2, with goals from Nabi Chowdhury, Ashraf Chowdhury, Kabir Ahmed, and Noor Islam. They lost their second exhibition match in Lahore on 14 October, going down 0–2 to Bata Sports Club. On 16 October, East Pakistan secured a 2–1 victory in Gujranwala against the local Al Hilal Club, with goals from Nabi Chowdhury and Shah Alam. The tour concluded on 17 October with a 2–1 win over Montgomery XI in Montgomery, as Ghazi and Kabir scored the goals.

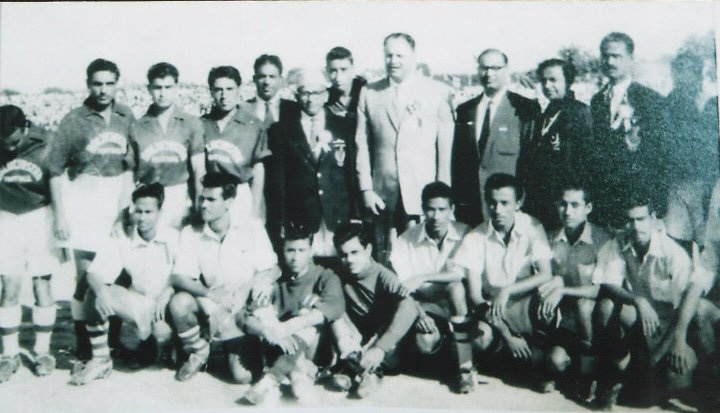
East Pakistan and Balochistan teams pictured at the 1959 National Championship final with Ayub Khan

The team began their National Championship campaign on 31 October, defeating Sindh 1–0 to reach the semi-finals, with the match’s only goal scored in the first half by skipper Kabir. In the semi-final on 3 November, East Pakistan defeated Punjab 1–0, courtesy of a solitary goal by Shah Alam in the sixth minute of the first-half. Notably, the defending champions fielded six international players: M.N. Jehan, Sher Mohammed, Shaukat, Masood, Hanif, and Niamat. The final, held on 7 November before a crowd of 20,000 that included President Ayub Khan, saw East Pakistan lose 0–1 to Baluchistan, with the only goal coming after goalkeeper Ranjit Das was beaten by a 30-yard strike from Taj Muhammad Jr. within two minutes of the second half.

East Pakistan XI: Ranjit, Zahir, Ghaznavi, Nabi, Abid, Imam Bakhsh, Islam, Kabir (captain), Ashraf, Mari, Shah Alam.

Baluchistan XI: Siddiq, Afzal, Qayyum (captain), Ahmad Munir, Qamar Ali, Ashique Hossain, Agha Gul, Taj Jr., Ghulam Rasool, Hussain Bakhsh, Ahmad.

=== 1960 Karachi; champions ===
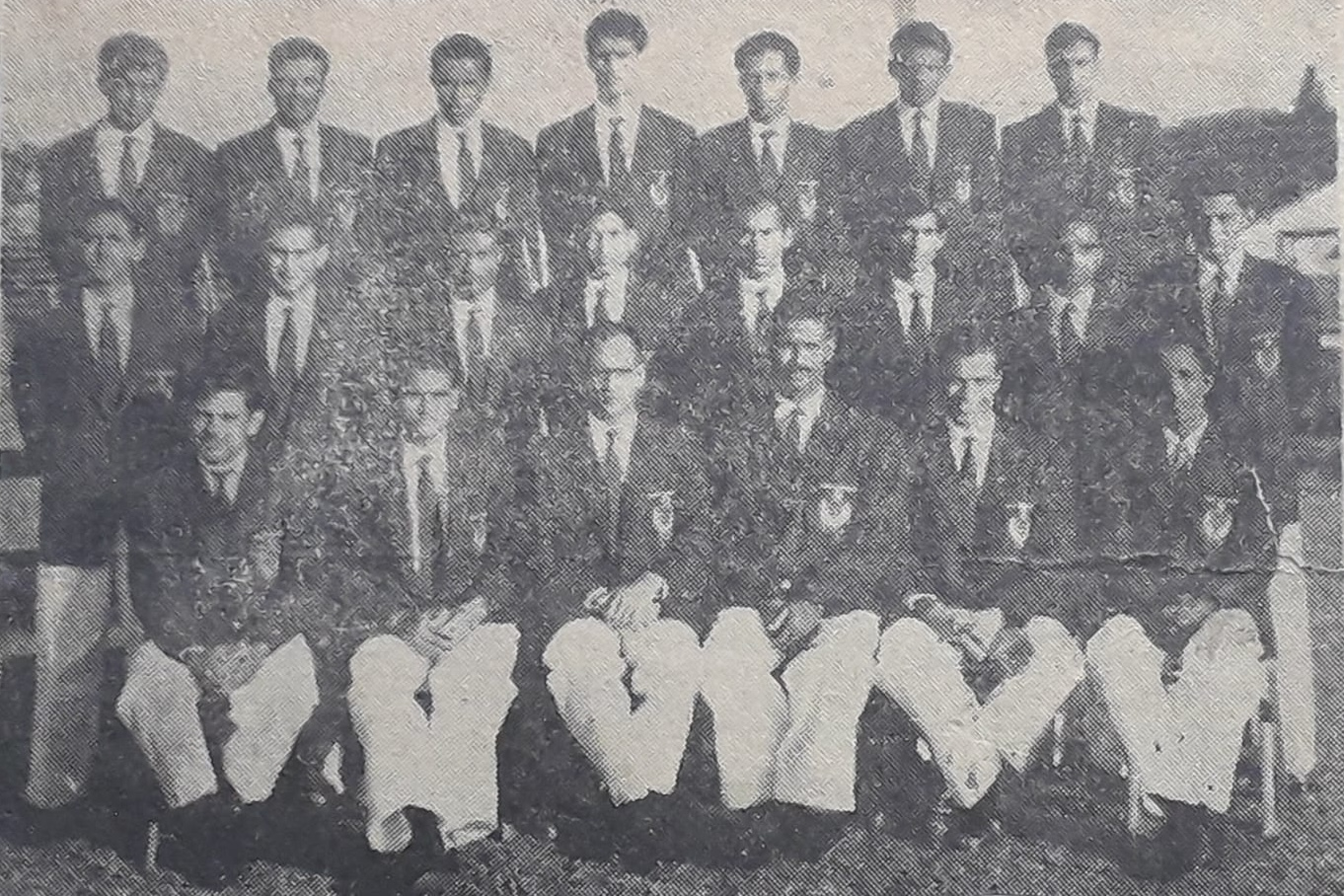
East Pakistan football team pictured before 1960 National Football Championship

In November 1960, East Pakistan participated in the eleventh National Championship held in Karachi. The team coached by Sheikh Shaheb Ali, entered the tournament without key players Amir Jang Ghaznavi, Kabir Ahmed, Aman Chowdhury, Abu Jan, and Qamruzzaman Qamru, all of whom were suspended while playing for Mohammedan SC in the Aga Khan Gold Cup. To fill the gaps, the East Pakistan Sports Federation included several West Pakistani players who were playing in the regional league, such as Gafur Baloch, Ghulam Rabbani, Moosa Jr., and Muhammad Yaqub. On the eve of their departure for Karachi, the team played an exhibition match against 502 Workshop on 7 November, winning 3–1.

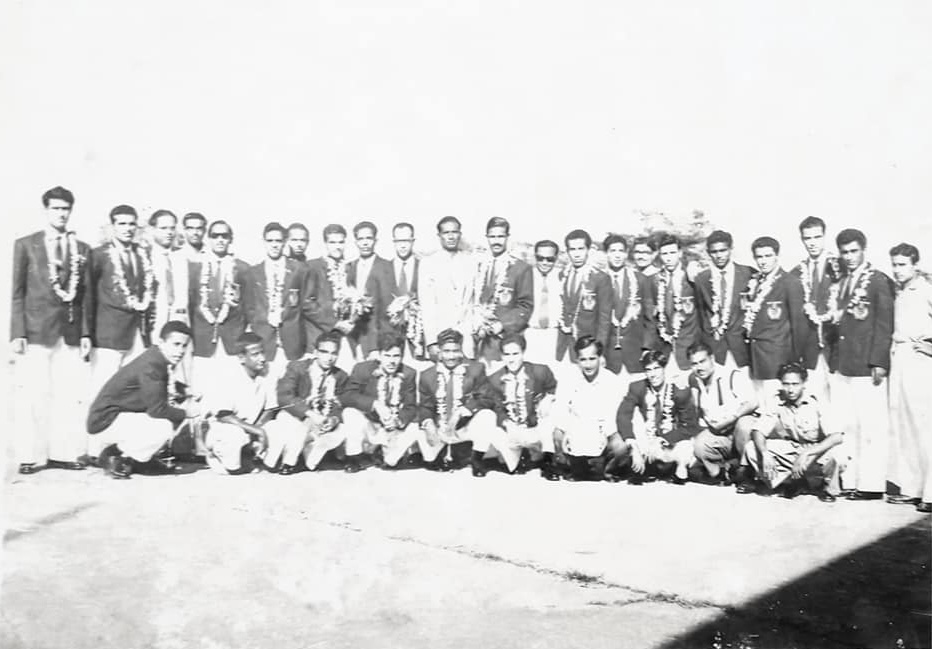
1960 National Championship winning East Pakistan team

Under the captaincy of Zahirul Haque, East Pakistan began their round-robin league campaign with a 3–1 victory over Karachi Greens, the junior string of Karachi, on 12 November, Muhammad Yaqub scoring all three goals for his side. The team followed this with a comprehensive 5–0 win against Pakistan Combined Railways on 16 November in their second group fixture. Goals were scored by Moosa Jr., Rabbani, an own goal by Abdul Haq, and Muhammad Yaqub, who netted twice. In their final group match on 19 November against Pakistan Army, East Pakistan were held to a 1–1 draw, with left-inside Abdullah Rahi scoring the equaliser, a result that ensured they finished top of the group and progressed to the semi-finals.

In the semi-final held on 24 November, the team defeated Punjab Blues 3–0 to reach the championship final for a second consecutive time, with a brace from Muhammad Yaqub and a lone strike from Rabbani. In the final against Karachi Whites, held on 27 November, a goal in the 75th minute by Moosa Jr., clinched the team's first-ever National Championship title. The game was enjoyed by more than 15,000 spectators at the Railway Stadium.

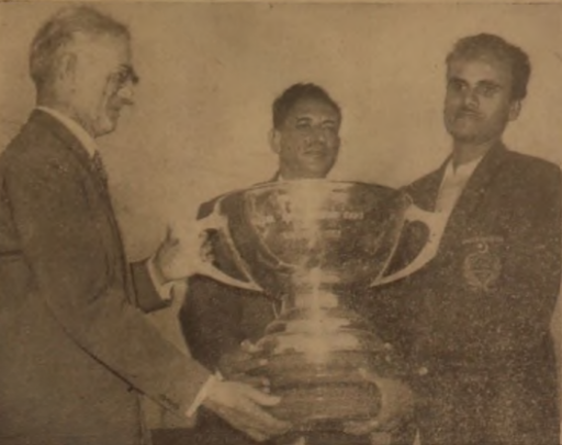
East Pakistan captain Zahirul Haque receiving the National Championship trophy from F.M. Khan on 27 November 1960

The team returned to Dacca on 30 November via Pakistan International Airlines, where they were warmly received by high-ranking government officials, passionate football fans, and, most notably, Brig. Sahib Dad Khan, the President of the East Pakistan Sports Federation, at Tejgaon Airport. The following day, 1 December, they were honored with a civic reception at Dacca Stadium.

East Pakistan XI: Muhammad Siddiq, Zahir (captain), Saifuddin Ahmed, Rasool Bakhsh, Gafur Baloch, MA Samad, Bashir, Moosa Jr., Yaqub, Abdullah, Rabbani.

Karachi Whites XI: Ghulam Hussain, Khuda Bakhsh, Ali, Ismail Roshu, Ismail Sr., Mirdad, Taqi, Mahmud, Yousuf Sr.

Following this success, the National Football Championship was restricted to divisional teams starting in 1961. Consequently, the EPSF introduced teams from Dacca, Chittagong, Khulna, and Rajshahi, marking the end of the provincial team's participation in the tournament.

== International and Friendly record ==
=== Pakistan (1955, 1959, 1962) ===
==== 1955 ====
Prior to the 1955 Colombo Cup in Dacca, East Pakistan, the Pakistan national football team played an exhibition match against an East Pakistan provincial selection (also referred to as East Bengal) at Dacca Stadium on 14 December 1955. The hosts suffered a 1–3 defeat, with Jamil Akhtar scoring a hat-trick for Pakistan, while Rashid Chunna netted the lone goal for the East Wing. Notably, Pakistan's final squad for the tournament included three players from East Pakistan: Abdur Rahim, Fazlur Rahman Arzu, and Nabi Chowdhury. Eventually, another East Pakistani, Tajul Islam Manna from Azad Sporting Club was also called up to the squad.

East Pakistan XI: Ranjit, Ghaznavi, Saudagar, Solaiman, Shokhi Samad, Newaz Alam, Arzu, Kabir, Rashid Sr., Rahim, Rashid Jr.

Pakistan XI: Nasir, Bali, Qayyum, Nabi, Sumbal, Abdul Majid, Sher Shah, Taj Jr., Kutty, Jamil, Moosa.

==== 1959 ====
On 18 April 1959, just a few days before touring Burma, the Pakistan national team defeated East Pakistan Sports Federation XI (EPSF XI) 7–0 in Dacca in an exhibition match at Dhaka Stadium. Notably, the Pakistan national team included Kabir Ahmed from the East Wing, who scored a brace, while centre-forward Muhammad Umer scored a hat-trick. The other goals were scored by Moosa Ghazi and Ibrahim.

EPSF XI: Mintu (Abdus Sadeq), Zahir, Eugene Gomes, Qamruzzaman Qamru, Samad, Zia (Saber), Badsha, Bashir, Saghir (Shuja), Mari, Manzoor.

Pakistan XI: Siddiq, Irshad, Qayyum, Hussain, Masood, Ghafoor, Ibrahim, Umer, Abdullah, Moosa.

In May 1959, the Pakistan national team toured the Eastern Province, playing exhibition matches in Chittagong, Dhaka, Mymensingh, and Pabna. During their stay in Dhaka, the team played the East Pakistan Sports Federation XI for the second time within a month, on 14 May at Dhaka Stadium. Pakistan won the match 2–1, with Yousuf Sr. scoring both goals. The home side's lone goal was scored by Railway forward Shankar. The home side's 19-year-old custodian, Manzur Hasan Mintu, was blamed for both goals conceded in the first half and was replaced by Manash at half-time.

EPSF XI: Mintu (Manash), Zahir, Imam Bakhsh, Nabi, Gafur Baloch, Qamruzzaman Qamru (Kasem), Ejaz Rasool (Aman Chowdhury), Bashir, Shankar, Mari, Taher.

Pakistan XI: Siddiq, Irshad, Niamat, Shaukat, Masood, Ghafoor, Ibrahim, Kabir, Qayyum, Abdullah, Yousuf Sr.

==== 1962 ====
On 25 August 1962, Pakistan defeated the East Pakistan Sports Federation XI 4–1, with M.N. Jehan scoring all four goals. The East Wing scored their only goal when Muhammad Irshad put the ball into his own net. The match was played as preparation for the 1962 Merdeka Tournament, and the Pakistan team, coached by former East Pakistan coach Sheikh Shaheb Ali, once again included Kabir Ahmed, who had represented the EPSF XI in the exhibition match.

EPSF XI: Ghulam Hussain, Khuda Bakhsh, Murad, Debinash (Khamisa), Rasool Bakhsh, Qamruzzaman Qamru (Kasem), Pintoo, Kabir, Yousuf Jr., Aboojan, Abbas, Yousuf Sr.

Pakistan XI: Niaz, Irshad, Gafur Baloch, Haq, Abid, Ghafoor, Mirdad, Abdullah, Umer, Jehan, Moosa.

Another fixture was arranged on 2 September 1962, Pakistan would defeat East Pakistan XI by 4–2. The East Pakistan team scored both goals through Ghulam Abbas Baloch, while Pakistan found their goals from forwards Abdullah Rahi, Muhammad Umer, Abid Hussain Ghazi, and M.N. Jehan.

EPSF XI: Ghulam Hussain, Khuda Bakhsh, Murad Bakhsh, Khamisa, Rasool Bakhsh (Kazi Mobasher), Zakaria Pintoo, Anwar, Yousuf Jr., Ghulam Abbas, Jamboo, Yousuf Sr..

Pakistan XI: Niaz, Irshad, Gafur Baloch, Haq, Abid, Ghafoor, Rabbani, Abdullah, Umer, Jehan, Moosa.

=== Burma (1961) ===
In January 1961, the Burma national team toured East Pakistan and played three exhibition matches against the Pakistan national team in both Dacca and Chittagong. Prior to their first match against Pakistan in Dacca, Burma played an exhibition match against an East Pakistan XI on 17 January 1961, defeating the hosts 0–3. Suk Bahadur scored the first and last goal, the first through a free kick. Maung Ko scored the second goal for Burma.

East Pakistan XI: Ranjit, Zahir, Nabi, Saifuddin, Dijesh, Samad, Rabbani, Abdullah, Yaqub, Prakash, Batu (Mobasser, Gadadhar, Jamboo)

Burma XI: Hla Baw, Tun Aung, Tin Oo, S. Tin Tun, Aung Thein, Tin Kyi, Bahadur, Ko Ko Gyi, Toe Aung, Kyaw Zaw, Hla Win (Kyi Thein, Tin Thaung, Vernon Stiles, Hla Htay, Thaw Htwe, Maung Ko)

On 25 January, Burma played another exhibition match against the East Wing, winning 1–9 in the game held at Chittagong's Niaz Stadium. The East Wing took the lead in the second minute through Liton. Following this, Burma's center-forward, Ko Ko Gyi, scored six goals. The other Burmese scorers were Kyaw Zaw, Aung Thein and Thaw Htwe. Other sources note Ko Ko Gyi scoring five, Kyaw Zaw scoring two, and Aung Thein and Thaw Htwe scoring one each.

East Pakistan XI: Ranjit, Sudhir, Nabi, Saifuddin, Dinesh, Saber, Liton, Shankar, Nishit, Gada, Taher

=== China (1963) ===
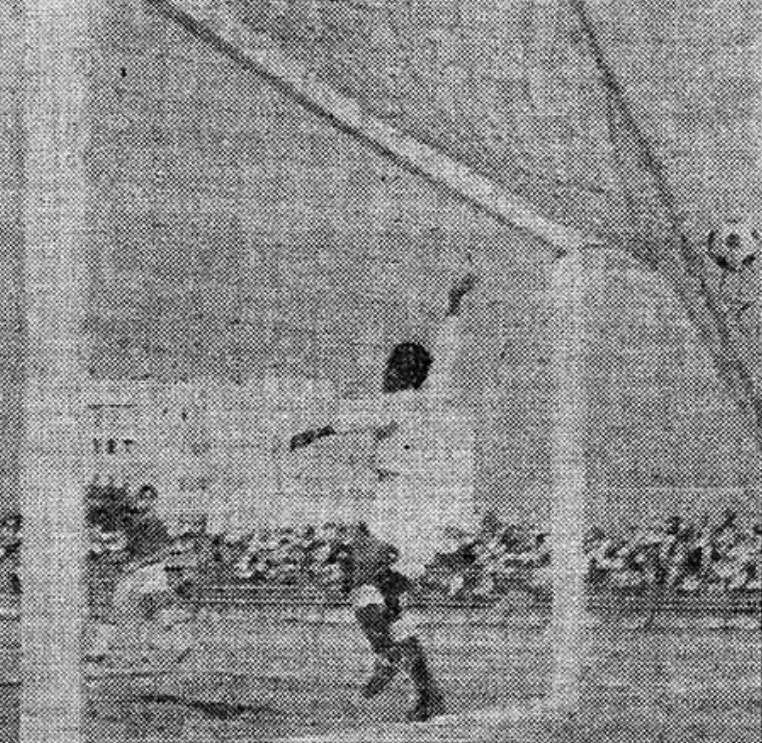
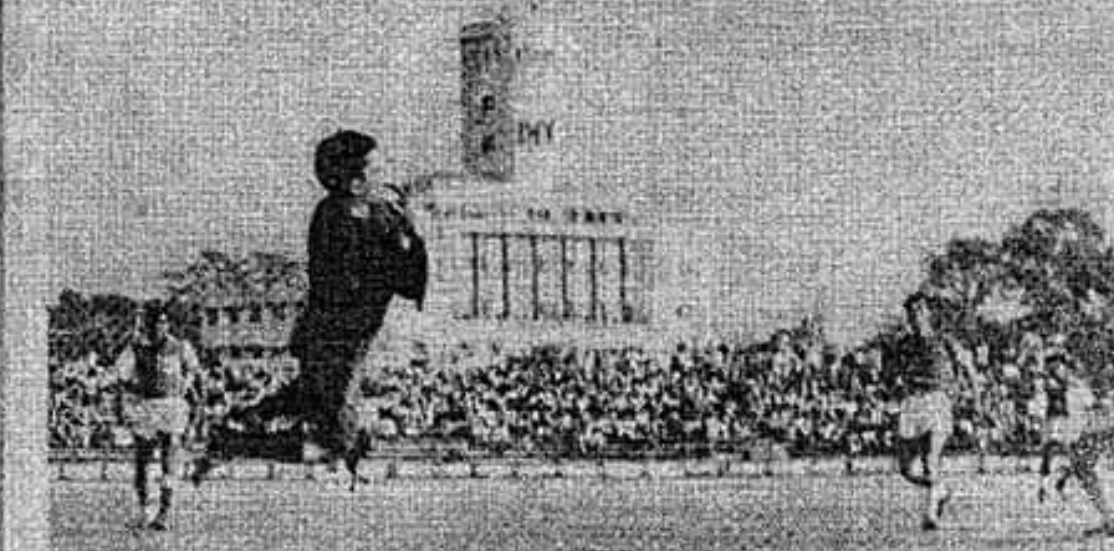
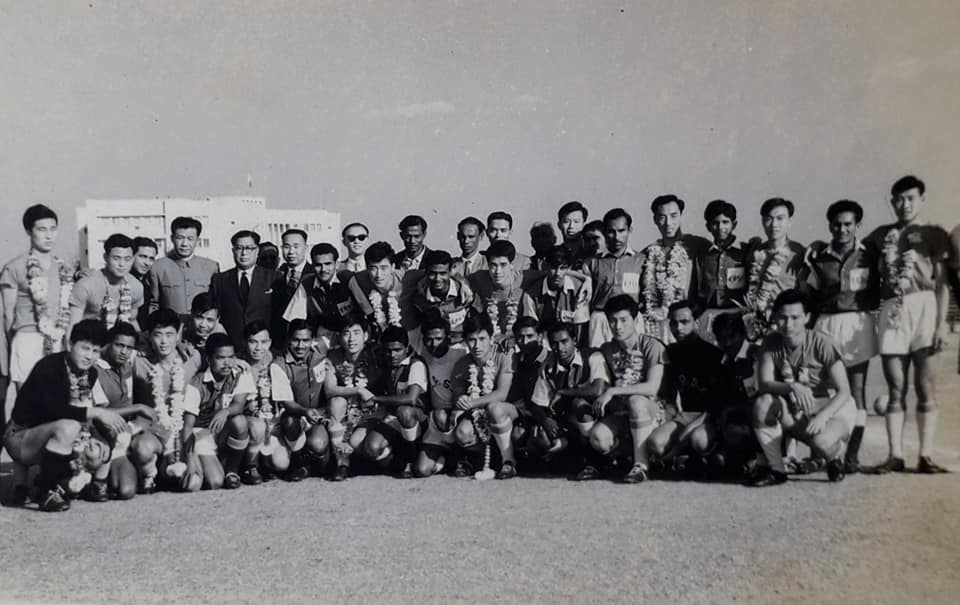
East Pakistan vs China, exhibition match held in Dacca on 24 January 1963

In January 1963, the China national football team toured Pakistan to play four exhibition matches against the Pakistan national team. Before their first match, China played a warm-up game against the "East Pakistan Sports Federation XI" in Dacca. The East Pakistan team was missing Pakistan internationals Gafur Baloch, Muhammad Umer, and Abdul Ghafoor, all of whom had represented the Dacca Division in that year's National Championship. This led to the formation of a new squad under coach Abdus Sattar. In the match held at Dacca Stadium on 24 January 1963, China dominated East Pakistan, winning 11–1. Chinese inside-right Zhang Honggen scored thrice, inside-left Chen Jialiang scored twice, and centre-forward Chang Ching-tien, Chen Jiagen, Sun Yu-yun, Uchup-hua, Chen Weng-fan, and Sun En-nu scored one each. East Pakistan's lone consolation goal was scored by Bashir Ahmed.

ESPF XI: Abdus Sadek (Zafar Imam), Zahir, Kazi Mobassar Hossain, Saifuddin Ahmed, Debinash, Shokhi Samad, Pintoo, Kabir, Bashir, Shamsul Islam Mollah, Jamil Akhter (Batu), Pratap.

China players (starting XI unspecified): Chang Chon-shiu (Sang Ting-ling), Sun Yu-min, Sun Pao-jung, Kao Fen-wen, Sun En-nu, Wang Feng-chu, Kang Ke-pin, Chang Ching-tien, Chen Jiagen, Chen Weng-fan, Chen Jialiang, Zhang Honggen, Sun Yuan-yun, Uchup-hua, Ni Che-te.

=== Fortuna Düsseldorf (1963) ===
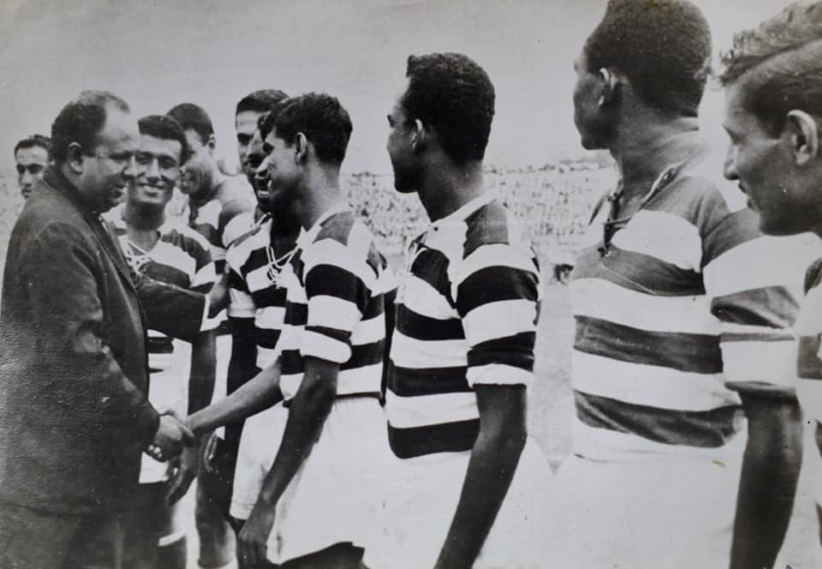
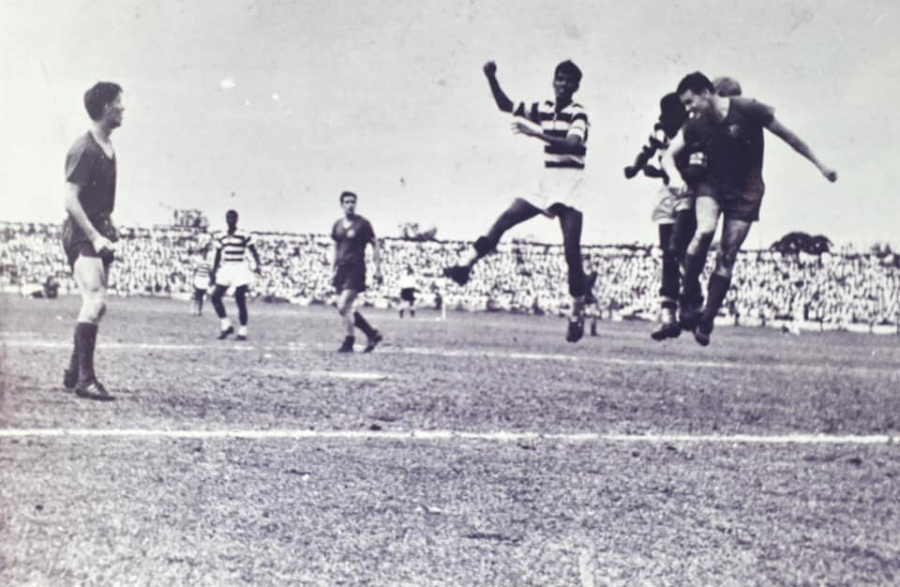
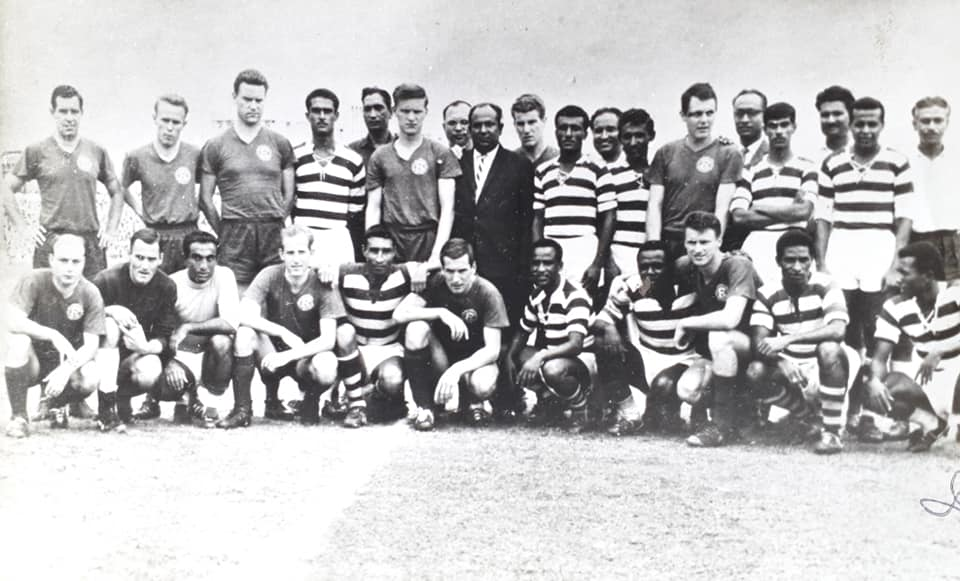
East Pakistan Sports Federation XI vs Fortuna Düsseldorf, exhibition match held in Dacca on 9 June 1963

In 1963, during a global tour, Germany's Bundesliga club Fortuna Düsseldorf encountered aircraft problems, resulting in an unplanned stay in Pakistan. The Pakistan Football Federation seized the opportunity to invite the team to play friendly matches against select XI teams from East and West Pakistan. Fortuna eagerly accepted the invitation and faced the East Pakistan Sports Federation XI in Dacca on June 9. The team, captained by veteran forward and former Pakistan national team captain Qayyum Changezi, was defeated 1–4 by the Germans at the Dacca Stadium. Changezi scored East Pakistan's consolation goal from a long-distance free-kick.

EPSF XI: Ghulam Hussain, Qayyum (Debinash), Khamisa (Amin Baloch), Abid, Abdul Ghafoor, Gafur Baloch, Yousuf Jr., Bashir, Umer, Ghulam Abbas, Yousuf Sr.

Fortuna Düsseldorf XI: Görtz, Klessa, Hoffmann, Hellingrath, Vigna, Krafft, Volberg, Wolfframm, Lindackers, Straschitz, Meyer.

=== Other matches ===
In December 1957, the "East Pakistan Sports Federation President's XI" played three exhibition matches against the touring Calcutta Football League champions, Calcutta Mohammedan in Dacca. On 15 December, the teams played their final exhibition match, which was watched by the chief minister of East Pakistan, Ataur Rahman Khan, and ended in a 1–1 draw, largely credited to East Pakistan's goalkeeper, Ranjit Das.

On 24 November 1964, East Pakistan played a test match against Soviet side Neftyanik at the Niaz Stadium in Chittagong, the Soviet side also played several test matches later against the Pakistan national football team. The match ended in a 0–2 defeat for the eastern wing.

In 1969, the East Pakistan XI played two exhibition matches against the touring Yangzee FC from South Korea.

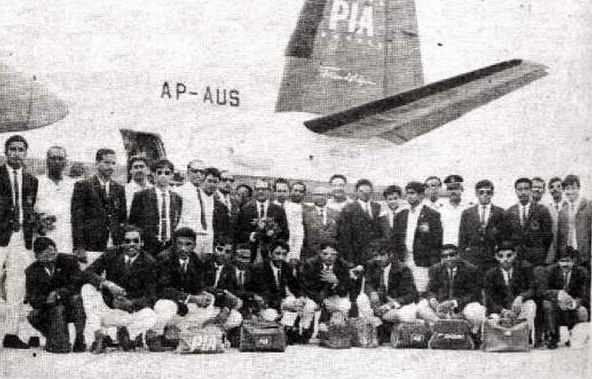
EPSF team which won the 1970 King Mahendra Cup in Nepal. The team consisted of players from both East and West regions of Pakistan.

On 11 June 1970, the All Nepal Football Association arranged a football tournament to celebrate the 50th birth anniversary of King Mahendra, which was eventually won by the East Pakistan Sports Federation team. East Pakistan defeated Border Security Force team from India by 2–0 in the title-deciding game of the tournament, which was held in a round-robin league format, with Maula Bakhsh scoring a brace. This was the team's first and only international title. Notably the East Pakistan team included seven players from West Pakistan, all of whom were playing in the Dhaka First Division League at the time. On 21 June, the team extended their stay in Nepal by playing an exhibition match against a national selection and winning 3–0.

Following the start of the Bangladesh Liberation War, the Shadhin Bangla football team was formed, marking the first instance of a national football team composed entirely of East Pakistani players. The team was captained by Zakaria Pintoo, with Pratap Shankar Hazra as vice-captain and Mohammed Shajahan as a forward; all three had previously played for the East Pakistan football team. After Bangladesh gained independence, the newly formed Bangladesh national football team made its international debut in 1973, with six players from the first squad being former members of the East Pakistan football team.

== Youth team ==
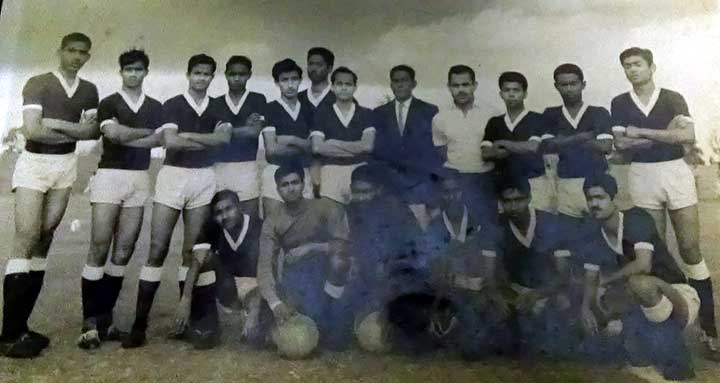
The youth team at the 1968 National Youth Championship in Mymensingh

In 1967, German coach Räsli Kotier arrived in Dacca to conduct trials for the East Pakistan Youth Team in preparation for the Pakistan National Youth Championship (East Zone). He initially selected eighty players, eventually narrowing it down to a final squad of sixteen. The East Pakistan Youth Team went on to defeat Chittagong Division 3–1 in the championship final, with striker Iqbal Chowdhury scoring twice.

The following year, the National Youth Championship (East Zone) took place in Mymensingh. Under the guidance of coach Ranjit Das, the youth team once again reached the final after defeating Chittagong Division 2–1 in the semi-final. However, in the final held at Mymensingh Stadium, they lost 0–1 to the Combined University XI after 120 minutes of extra time.

== Squads ==
1950 National Football Championship:

- Elias, Ataul, Shudhir, Samad Khan, Aminur Rahman Dhonu, Mohamed Rashidullah, Shofi, Dalil, Rashid, Fazlu, Abed, George Macwa, Alauddin Khan, Raushan Ali "Robson", Razzak, Lt. Zayda.

1952 National Football Championship:

- East Bengal Whites: Momtaz, Eugene Gomes, Amin Asad (Captain), Fazlur Rahman Arzu, Sgt. Rahman, Koraishi, Akram, Shahjahan, Raushan Ali "Robson", Abul Hossain, Abdur Rahim, Sultan, Kodrut Ullah Bhuiyan, Nur Miya, Anwar Hossain, Noor Hossain.
- East Bengal Greens: Hamid, Chad, Ketu, Daliluddin Khan, Hannan, Newaz Alam, Lal Mohammed, Fazlu, Rashid Chunna, Khalek Sarkar, Ashrafuddin Mallik, Taslim, Solaiman, Shamsu, Charles.

1953 National Football Championship:

- Dhirendra Chandra Bhawal, Momtaz, K.A. Anasari (Captain), Rashid Chunna (Vice-captain), Newaz Alam, Sailesh, Sheikh Shaheb Ali, A.M. Rahman, Abdur Rahim, Fazlu, Nurul Islam Nanna, Khalek Sarkar, Bhanu, Fazlur Rahman Arzu, Tarapada Roy.

1954 National Football Championship:

- Wajeed Ali Miazi, Nabi Khan, Eugene Gomes, Hannan, Sheikh Shaheb Ali (Vice-captain), Bhuloo, Solaiman, Bachu, Nuru, Illias Uddin Ahmed, Rashid, F.R. Khan, Raushan Ali "Robson" (Captain), Ashraf Chowdhury, Shah Alam, S.A. Jamman Mukta, Abdur Rahim.

1955 National Football Championship:

- Wajeed Ali Miazi, Rashid Chunna (Captain), S.A. Jamman Mukta, Abdul Khalek Chowdhury, Abdur Rahim (Vice-captain), Fazlur Rahman Arzu, Ranjit Das, Newaz Alam, Shokhi Samad, Showkat Khan Chowdhury, Kabir Ahmed, Saghir, Bachu, Rafiq, Amir Jang Ghaznavi, Tajul Islam Manna, Hannan.

1956 National Football Championship:

- Wajeed Ali Miazi (Captain), Ranjit Das, Amir Jang Ghaznavi, Sheikh Shaheb Ali, Eugene Gomes, Bachu, Dhonu, MA Samad, Shokhi Samad, Rashid Chunna, Kabir Ahmed, Ashraf Chowdhury, Mari Chowdhury, Shah Alam, S.A. Jamman Mukta, Batu.

1957 National Football Championship:

- East Pakistan Whites: Ranjit Das, Manzur Hasan Mintu, Amir Jang Ghaznavi, Eugene Gomes, Habib, Fazlur Rahman Arzu (Vice-captain), Nabi Chowdhury, MA Samad, Shokhi Samad, Rashid Jr., Kabir Ahmed, Ashraf Chowdhury, Mari Chowdhury (Captain), Shah Alam, Rashid Chunna, S.A. Jamman Mukta.
- East Pakistan Greens: Abdus Sadek, P. Gosh, Zahirul Haque, Sheikh Shaheb Ali (Captain), Shamsu, Qamruzzaman Qamru, Phani, Ratin Bose, Shamsul Haque, Humayun Kabir, Habib Ahmed (Vice-captain), Saghir, Rafiq, Kanti, Gadadhar, Raushan Ali "Robson".

1958 National Football Championship:

- Ranjit Das (Vice-captain), Nabi Chowdhury (Captain), Manzur Hasan Mintu, Zahirul Haque, Imam Bakhsh, Eugene Gomes, Kasem, Abid Hussain Ghazi, Shokhi Samad, Aman Chowdhury, Kabir Ahmed, Habib Ahmed, Mari Chowdhury, Shah Alam, Rashid Chunna, Bashir Ahmed.

1959 National Football Championship:

- Ranjit Das, Kabir Ahmed (Captain), Amir Jang Ghaznavi, Zahirul Haque, MA Samad, Islam, Nabi Chowdhury, Qamruzzaman Qamru, Shah Alam, Manzur Hasan Mintu, Mari Chowdhury, Abid Hussain Ghazi, Habib, Ghazi, Ashraf Chowdhury, Bashir Ahmed, Ejaz Rasool.

1960 National Football Championship:

- Muhammad Siddiq, Ranjit Das, Zahirul Haque (Captain), Saifuddin Ahmed, Gour Saha, Nabi Chowdhury, MA Samad, Zakaria Pintoo, Gafur Baloch, Rasool Bakhsh, Naoroz, Patrick, Selim Zamboo, Abdullah Rahi, Moosa Jr., Yaqub, Bashir Ahmed, Batu, Ghulam Rabbani.

Pakistan national team, 14 December 1955

- Ranjit Das, Shariq, Hannan, Amir Jang Ghaznavi, Bulu, Shokhi Samad, Newaz Alam, Bachu, Solaiman, Rashid Chunna (Captain), Kabir Ahmed, Tajul Islam Manna, Ashraf Chowdhury, F.R. Khan, Abdur Rahim, Rashid Jr., Shah Alam.

China national team, 24 January 1963

- Zafar Imam, Abdus Sadek, Pratap Shankar Hazra, Saiful, Debinash Sangma, Kabir Ahmed, Saifuddin Ahmed, Jamil Akhter, Kazi Mobassar Hossain, Zahirul Haque, Shamsul Islam Mollah, Bashir Ahmed, Zakaria Pintoo, Abu Taher Putu, Batu, Shokhi Samad.

Fortuna Düsseldorf, 9 June 1963

- Rezaul Haque Rana, Abdul Hakim, Qayyum Changezi (Captain), Bashir Ahmed, Kazi Mobassar Hossain, Gafur Baloch, Mari Chowdhury, Moosa Ghazi, Abid Hussain Ghazi, Faruk, Zahirul Haque, Milal.

Nepal King Mahendra Cup, 1970

- Shahidur Rahman Shantoo, Kasheem, Zakaria Pintoo (Captain), Mohammed Shajahan (Vice-captain), Nazir Ahmed Chowdhury, Farukuzzaman Faruk, Monwar Hossain Nannu, Amir Bakhsh, Abdullah Akbar, Ayub Dar, Ali Nawaz Baloch, Maula Bakhsh, Sultan Ahmed, Abdul Jabbar Baloch, Gafur, Golam Sarwar Tipu, Wazed Gazi.

== Honours ==
- National Football Championship
  - (gold) Champions (1): 1960
  - (silver) Runners-up (2): 1957, 1959
- King Mahendra Cup
  - (gold) Champions (1): 1970

== See also ==
- Football in Bangladesh
- Football in Pakistan
- List of Pakistan football champions
- Dacca football team
- Shadhin Bangla football team
- Bangladesh national football team
- Punjab football team
- Sindh football team
- Balochistan football team
- North-West Frontier Province football team
- Karachi football team
