= Muhammad Irshad =

Pakistani former footballer

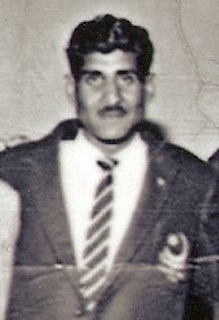
- Irshad in 1963

Personal information
- Full name: Muhammad Irshad
- Date of birth: Unknown
- Place of birth: British India
- Date of death: Unknown
- Positions: Defender; full-back

Senior career*
Years	Team	Apps	(Gls)
- Pakistan Army
1960	Mohammedan		

International career
1959–1963	Pakistan		
- * Club domestic league appearances and goals

Muhammad Irshad was a Pakistani footballer who played as a defender. Irshad played for Pakistan Army throughout his career, and is also considered as one of the best defenders to play for the Pakistan national team during 1960s.

== Club career ==
Irshad was a player of Pakistan Army from the 1960s till the end of his career. He also served as Havildar in the Pakistan Army.

In 1960, he represented Mohammedan Sporting Club in the Dhaka First Division Football League. The club finished unbeaten runners-up that season, missing out on the league title by two points.

== International career ==
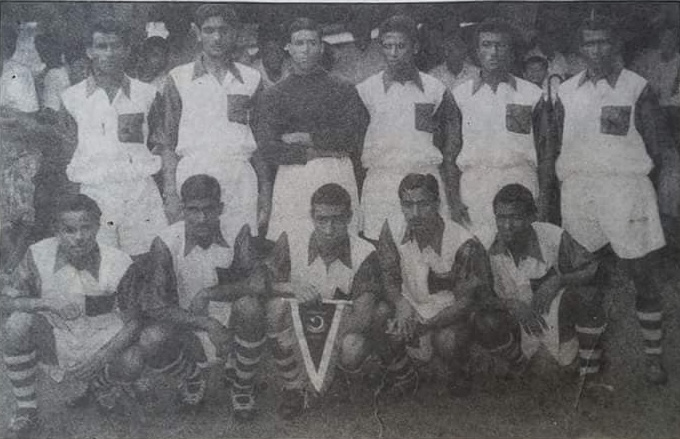
Irshad sitting second from left with the Pakistan national football team in 1959.

In 1959, Irshad was called up to the Pakistan national team by Scottish coach John McBride for their tour to Burma. The same year, he played in the 1960 AFC Asian Cup qualification.

The following year, Irshad was selected to play in the 1960 Merdeka Tournament held in Malaya.

In 1962, Irshad took part in the 1962 Merdeka Tournament, being an instrumental player throughout the tournament, also being included in the squad list for the final against Indonesia, Which Pakistan lost 1–2. The next year, Irshad also participated in the 1964 Summer Olympics Qualification.
