= Manzur Hasan Mintu =

Bangladeshi footballer (1940–2014)

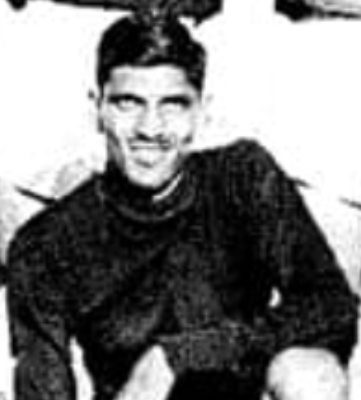
- Mintu with Dhaka Wanderers Club, 1961

Personal information
- Date of birth: 7 April 1940
- Place of birth: Dhaka, Bengal, British India
- Date of death: 18 November 2014 (aged 74)
- Place of death: Jaipur, India
- Position: Goalkeeper

Senior career*
Years	Team	Apps	(Gls)
1951–1955	Kamal Sporting		
1956–1957	Fire Service		
1958–1964	Dhaka Wanderers		

International career
1959	East Pakistan		
1958	Pakistan		
- * Club domestic league appearances and goals

Manzur Hasan Mintu (Bengali: মনজুর হাসান মিন্টু; 7 April 1940 – 18 November 2014) was a Bangladeshi footballer who played as a goalkeeper. He worked for radio and television as a sports commentator for 40 years since 1973. He was awarded National Sports Award for football and badminton by the Government of Bangladesh in 1978.

== Early life ==
Mintu was born on 7 April 1940, in Bakshi Bazar neighbourhood of Dhaka, Bengal, British India. He was a student of Dhaka College from 1956.

== Club career ==
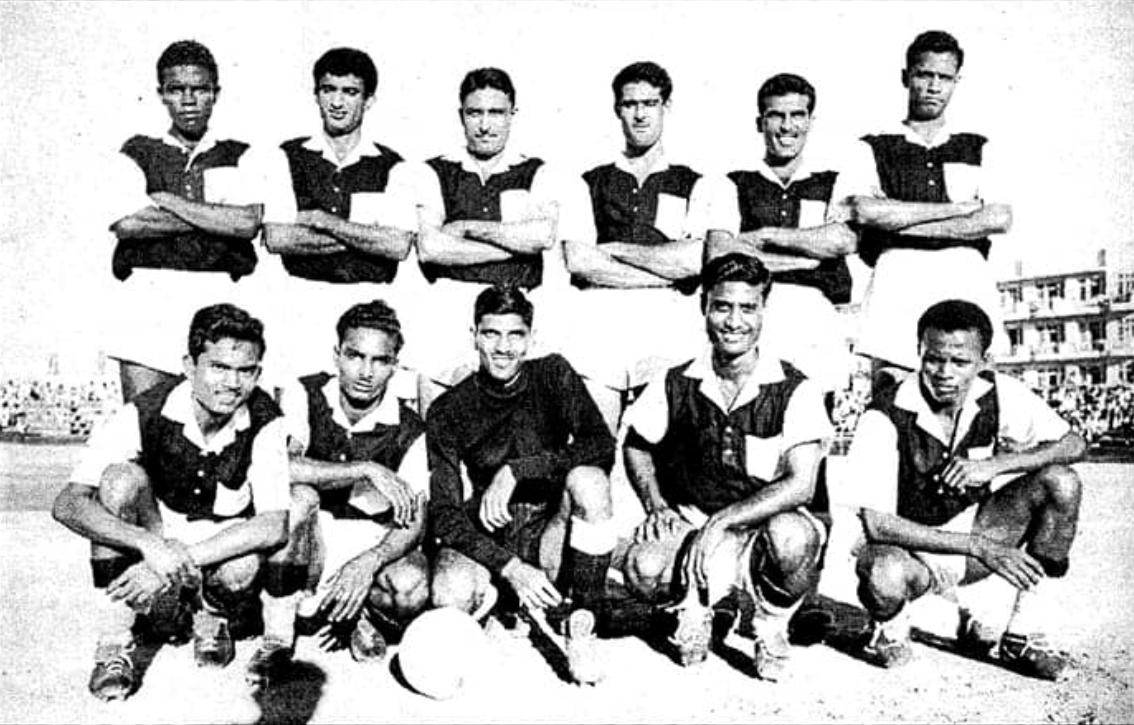
Mintu sitting third from right with Dhaka Wanderers prior to a match in the 1961 President's Gold Cup in Karachi

Mintu began playing in the Third Division of Dhaka with Kamal Sporting Club in 1951, where he was trained by local coach Bazlur Rahman. He started playing in the Second Division in 1953 and remained at the club until 1955.

In 1956, at the age of 16, Mintu made his debut in the First Division with Fire Service AC. In 1958, he joined Dhaka Wanderers and captained the team to a runners-up finish in 1959 and a league title in 1960. Notably, he represented the Wanderers in the 1957 IFA Shield in Calcutta and the 1961 President's Gold Cup in Karachi. He also represented Dhaka University in the 1961 Aga Khan Gold Cup. He represented East Pakistan in the National Football Championship from 1957 to 1959 and later played for Dhaka Division from 1961 to 1963.

== International career ==
In 1959, Mintu represented East Pakistan Sports Federation XI in two exhibition matches against the Pakistan national team. The first game held on 18 April, ended in a 0–7 defeat, while the second match on 14 May, saw EPSF XI suffer a 1–2 defeat.

Mintu played for the Pakistan national team in the 1958 Asian Games in Tokyo. Notably, the team included six Bengali players, including captain, Nabi Chowdhury.

== Post-retirement ==
Mintu graduated from the University of Dhaka with a major in political science in 1961 and began working as an income tax commissioner in 1964. After the retirement, he served as the treasurer of the National Sports Council, and began his career as a sports commentator from 1973. Mintu also played cricket, badminton, and hockey at the domestic level. He served as the joint-secretary of the Bangladesh Football Federation (BFF) from 1972 to 1975. He was also the general secretary of Dhaka Wanderers in 1986–88 and 1991–92, and the president in 2007–08.

== Death ==
Mintu died on 18 November 2014, after suffering a cardiac arrest in Jaipur, India.

== Honours ==
Dhaka Wanderers Club

- Dhaka First Division League: 1960

East Pakistan White

- National Championship runner-up: 1957

East Pakistan

- National Championship runner-up: 1959

Dhaka Division

- National Championship: 1961–62, 1962

Individual

- 1978 − National Sports Awards.

== Bibliography ==
- Dulal, Mahmud (2020). খেলার মাঠে মুক্তিযুদ্ধ (transl. Liberation war in the playground) (in Bengali). Bishhoshahitto Bhobon. ISBN 978-984-8218-31-0.
- Dulal, Mahmud (2014). পাকিস্তান জাতীয় দল বাঙালি খেলোয়াড় (transl. Bengali players in the Pakistan national team) (in Bengali). Bishhoshahitto Bhobon.
- Alam, Masud (2017). ফুটবলের গল্প ফুটবলারদের গল্প (transl. The story of football the story of footballers) (in Bengali). Bishhoshahitto Bhobon. ISBN 9789849134688.
- Mahmud, Noman (2018). ফুটবল পায়ে মুক্তির যুদ্ধ (transl. Liberation war fought by football) (in Bengali). Agamee Prakashani. ISBN 978-984-8218-31-0.
