= Independence Day Football Tournament =

Association football tournament in Bangladesh

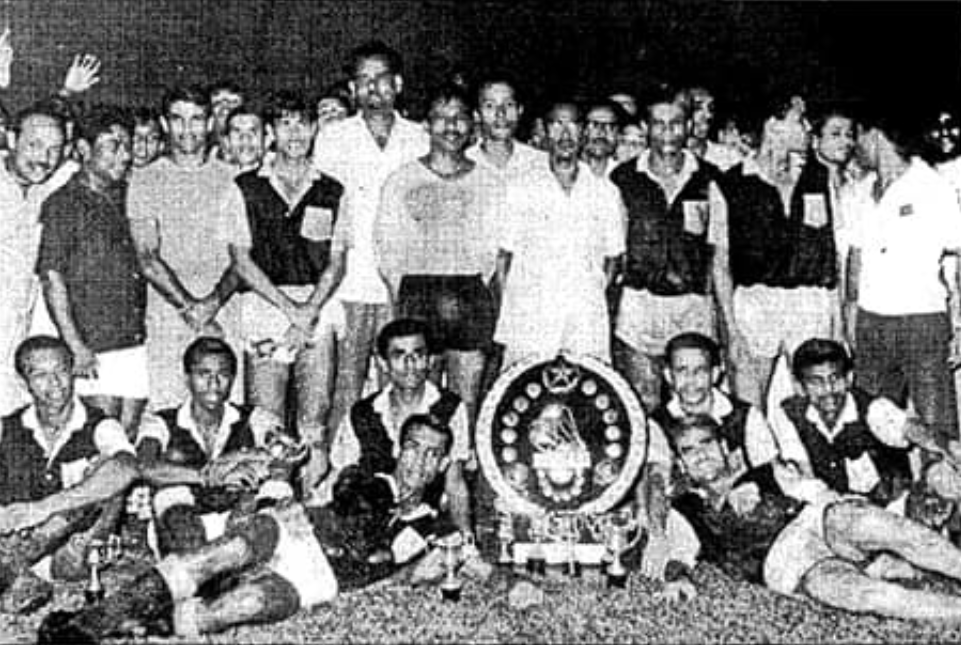
- 1965 Independence Day Tournament winners, Mohammedan SC
- Organiser(s): East Pakistan Sports Federation
- Founded: 1948
- Abolished: 1970
- Region: East Pakistan
- Teams: 8 (1970)
- Last champions: EPIDC (3rd title)
- Most championships: Mohammedan (6 titles)

The Independence Day Football Tournament, alternatively known as the Pakistan Day Football Tournament or the Azadi Day Football Tournament was a knock-out men's association football tournament held in Dhaka, East Pakistan by the East Pakistan Sports Federation (EPSF). The final was held annually on 14 August, the Pakistan's Independence Day. Following the Independence of Bangladesh, the Bangladesh Football Federation (BFF) introduced the tournament's successor in 1972, the Bangladesh Independence Cup, held to kick off domestic football following the Liberation War.

== Finals ==
Edition	Year	Champion	Runners-up	Score
1st	1948	East Bengal Railway	n/a	n/a
2nd	1949	Dhaka University	Dhaka City XI	2–1
3rd	1950	Dhaka City XI	East Bengal Railway	1–0
–	1951	not held		
–	1952	not held		
4th	1953	Dhaka University	East Bengal Railway	2–1
5th	1954	I.G. Police XI	Dhaka City XI	1–0
6th	1955	Dhaka Wanderers	I.G. Police XI	2–1
7th	1956	East Pakistan Secretariat XI	Dhaka Wanderers	2–1
8th	1957	Dhaka Wanderers & Police (shared)		1–1
9th	1958	Mohammedan	Dhaka University	2–1
10th	1959	Azad & Police (shared)		0–0
11th	1960	Mohammedan	Dhaka Wanderers	1–0
12th	1961	Mohammedan & Victoria (shared)		2–2
13th	1962	Victoria	Mohammedan	2–0
14th	1963	Dhaka Wanderers & Mohammedan (shared)		1–1
15th	1964	Victoria	Mohammedan	1–0
16th	1965	Mohammedan	Victoria	3–0
17th	1966	Dhaka Wanderers & Mohammedan (shared)		1–1
18th	1967	EPIDC	Mohammedan	4–0
19th	1968	EPIDC	Mohammedan	2–0
20th	1969	EPIDC	Dilkusha	3–2
21st	1970	Final abandoned due to riots		(Note: The final between EPIDC and Mohammedan abandoned at 2–0 due to riots which saw four spectators killed and 200 injured.)

== See also ==
- Independence Cup
- Dhaka First Division League
- Aga Khan Gold Cup
