= 1959 Aga Khan Gold Cup =

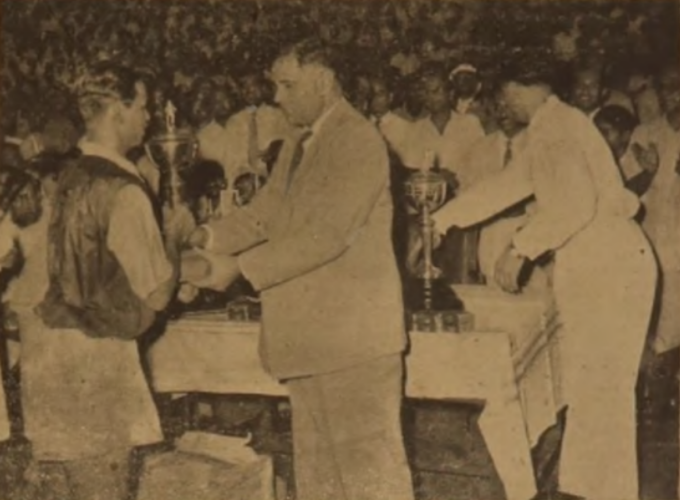
- Mohammedan SC captain, Ashraf Chowdhury, receiving the 1959 Aga Khan Gold Cup from Major General Umrao Khan

Tournament details
- Host country: East Pakistan (now Bangladesh)
- Dates: 24 August – 23 September 1959
- Teams: 20 (from 1 confederation)
- Venue: Various (in Dacca host cities)

Final positions
- Champions: (Pakistan) Mohammedan SC (1st title)

Tournament statistics
- Matches played: 19
- Goals scored: 64 (3.37 per match)

The 1959 Aga Khan Gold Cup was the second edition of the Aga Khan Gold Cup. The tournament was organized by the East Pakistan Sports Federation (EPSF) and most games were held at the Dhaka Stadium in Dacca, East Pakistan (now Bangladesh), from 24 August to 23 September 1959. Matches lasted 70 minutes, with 5 minutes recess.

== Venues ==
| Location | Name | Capacity | Image | Notes |
|---|---|---|---|---|
| Dacca | Dacca Stadium | 18,000 | | |
| Dacca | Mohammedan Sporting Club Ground | n/a | | |

== First round ==
24 August 1959

| Azad SC (Pakistan) | 2–1 | (Pakistan) Police AC |
|---|---|---|
| S.A. Jamman Mukta 28'; Zamboo 33' | | Rouf 60' |

Dacca Stadium, Dacca
Referee: Masudur Rahman (Pakistan)

Replay

On 4 September 1959, the EPSF scratched Azad SC from the tournament and awarded the match to Police AC after it was found that the winners had fielded an ineligible player during their match. Eventually, following an appeal from Azad SC, the EPSF decided to hold a replay of the match on 11 September 1959.

11 September 1959

| Azad SC (Pakistan) | 0–3 | (Pakistan) Police AC |
|---|---|---|
| | | Rouf; Nabi |

Mohammedan Sporting Club ground, Dacca
Referee: Masudur Rahman (Pakistan)

25 August 1959

| Karachi Youngmen Club (Pakistan) | 2–1 | (Pakistan) PWD SC |
|---|---|---|
| Sujit; Yaqub 66' | | Anjam Hossain 52' |

Dacca Stadium, Dacca
Referee: Hamza (Pakistan)

26 August 1959

| Dhaka Wanderers (Pakistan) | 2–1 | (Pakistan) Pak Moghuls |
|---|---|---|
| Moosa; Habib | | Rabbani |

Dacca Stadium, Dacca
Referee: Issa Khan (Pakistan)

31 August 1959

| East Pakistan Rifles | 1–2 | (Pakistan) Bogra Cotton Mills |
|---|---|---|
| Saghir | | N/A (og.); Ali 65' |

Dacca Stadium, Dacca
Referee: Ghulam Hossain (Pakistan)

1 September 1959

| Dhakeshwari Cotton Mills (Pakistan) | 0–0 | (Pakistan) Saidpur T.C. |

Dacca Stadium, Dacca
Referee: Issa Khan (Pakistan)

Replay

3 September 1959

| Dhakeshwari Cotton Mills (Pakistan) | 5–1 | (Pakistan) Saidpur T.C. |
|---|---|---|
| Nishith Chowdhury 14', 27' (?) | | Yaseen 10' |

Dacca Stadium, Dacca
Referee: Issa Khan (Pakistan)

== Second round ==
28 August 1959

| Dhaka Wanderers (Pakistan) | 2–0 | (Pakistan) Karachi Youngmen Club |
|---|---|---|
| Ghazi; Paltu |

Dacca Stadium, Dacca
Referee: Issa Khan (Pakistan)

Replay

The game was replayed after Karachi Youngmen Club protested that it had been concluded earlier than scheduled.

6 September 1959

| Dhaka Wanderers (Pakistan) | 1–0 | (Pakistan) Karachi Youngmen Club |
|---|---|---|
| Patrick 51' |

Dacca Stadium, Dacca
Referee: Golam Hossain (Pakistan)

29 August 1959

| East Bengal Railway (Pakistan) | 1–3 | (Pakistan) Central Stationary |
|---|---|---|
| Shankar | | Wasi; Aziz |

Dacca Stadium, Dacca
Referee: Masudur Rahman (Pakistan)

30 August 1959

| Mohammedan SC (Pakistan) | 4–1 | (Pakistan) Rajshahi University |
|---|---|---|
| Asharf; Mahtab (og.); Ilyas | | S.F. Bari |

Dacca Stadium, Dacca
Referee: Afzal Khan (Pakistan)

9 September 1959

| Bogra Cotton Mills (Pakistan) | Walkover (Note: The game was awarded to Bogra Cotton Mills as their opponents failed to arrive in Dhaka on time.) | (Pakistan) Usmania |

Dacca Stadium, Dacca

13 September 1959

| Karachi Municipal Corporation (Pakistan) | 2–0 | (Pakistan) Wari Club |
|---|---|---|
| Abbas 25', 28' |

Dacca Stadium, Dacca
Referee: Issa Khan (Pakistan)

14 September 1959

| Karachi Port Trust (Pakistan) | 4–2 | (Pakistan) Police AC |
|---|---|---|
| Mahmood 16', 69'; Kasim 45'; Mirdad 65' | | Kabir 29' (pen.); Samir 31' |

Dacca Stadium, Dacca
Referee: Golam Hossain (Pakistan)

== Third round ==
11 September 1959

| Mohammedan SC (Pakistan) | Abandoned (3–0) (Note: The game was abandoned 12 minutes earlier due to heavy rain while Mohammedan were leading 3–0.) | (Pakistan) Bogra Cotton Mills |
|---|---|---|
| Aman Chowdhury 25'; Shah Alam 43'; Asharf 47' |

Dacca Stadium, Dacca
Referee: Issa Khan (Pakistan)

Replay

13 September 1959

| Mohammedan SC (Pakistan) | 3–1 | (Pakistan) Bogra Cotton Mills |
|---|---|---|
| Aman Chowdhury 44'; Abid 68'; Asharf 69' | | Salam 25' |

Dacca Stadium, Dacca
Referee: Afzal Khan (Pakistan)

8 September 1959

| Dhaka Wanderers (Pakistan) | 1–2 | (Sri Lanka) Ceylon F.A. |
|---|---|---|
| Moosa 38' (pen.) | | Andrew Fernando 45', 64' |

Dacca Stadium, Dacca
Referee: Masudur Rahman (Pakistan)

15 September 1959

| Karachi Municipal Corporation (Pakistan) | 1–0 | (Pakistan) Central Stationary |
|---|---|---|
| Aslam 13' |

Dacca Stadium, Dacca
Referee: Masudur Rahman (Pakistan)

16 September 1959

| Karachi Port Trust (Pakistan) | 4–0 | (Pakistan) Dhakeshwari Cotton Mills |
|---|---|---|
| Mahmud 10', 11', 51' (pen.); Ibrahim 67' |

Dacca Stadium, Dacca
Referee: Afzal Khan (Pakistan)

== Semi-finals ==
17 September 1959

| Karachi Municipal Corporation (Pakistan) | 3–0 | (Sri Lanka) Ceylon F.A. |
|---|---|---|
| Abdullah 10'; Abbas 25'; Rasool Bux 30' (pen.) |

Dacca Stadium, Dacca
Referee: Golam Hossain (Pakistan)

18 September 1959

| Mohammedan SC (Pakistan) | 2–0 | (Pakistan) Karachi Port Trust |
|---|---|---|
| Ashraf 25' (?) |

Dacca Stadium, Dacca
Referee: Masudur Rahman (Pakistan)

== Third-place ==
19 September 1959

| Ceylon F.A. (Sri Lanka) | 7–2 | (Pakistan) Karachi Port Trust |
|---|---|---|
| Yogoraja 5'; Andrew Fernando 6'; Nicholas (?), 67'; Aluwihara | | Ibrahim 65'; Mahmud |

Dacca Stadium, Dacca
Referee: Hamza (Pakistan)

== Final ==
20 September 1959
16:30 UTC+6

| Mohammedan SC (Pakistan) | Abandoned (3–0) (Note: The game was abandoned 15 minutes from full-time due to heavy rain and poor lighting, with Mohammedan leading 3–0.) | (Pakistan) Karachi Municipal Corporation |
|---|---|---|
| Madan 8'; Bashir 15'; Ashraf |

Dacca Stadium, Dacca
Attendance: 35,000
Referee: Golam Hossain (Pakistan) (Note: Golam Hossain was replaced by Masudur Rahman following the interval.)

Replay

23 September 1959
16:30 UTC+6

| Mohammedan SC (Pakistan) | 2–0 | (Pakistan) Karachi Municipal Corporation |
|---|---|---|
| Madan 30'; Ashraf 38' |

Dacca Stadium, Dacca
Referee: Masudur Rahman (Pakistan)

| Mohammedan | KMC |

| GK | Ranjit Das (GK) |
| DF | Habib Ahmed |
| DF | Amir Jang Ghaznavi |
| DF | Qamruzzaman Qamru |
| MF | Abid Hussain Ghazi |
| MF | Imam Bux |
| FW | Bashir Ahmed |
| FW | Aman Chowdhury |
| FW | Madan | 30' |
| FW | Shah Alam |
| FW | Ashraf Chowdhury (c) | 38' |
Substitutions:
None

| GK | Ghulam Hussain (GK) |
| DF | Allah Bux |
| DF | Ghafoor |
| DF | Yar Mohammad |
| MF | Saleh |
| MF | Golam |
| MF | Rasool Bux |
| FW | Haroon |
| FW | Ghulam Abbas Baloch |
| FW | Abdullah Rahi |
| FW | Yousuf Sr. |
Substitutions:
None
