= Ranjit Das (footballer) =

Bangladeshi football player and coach (1932–2026)

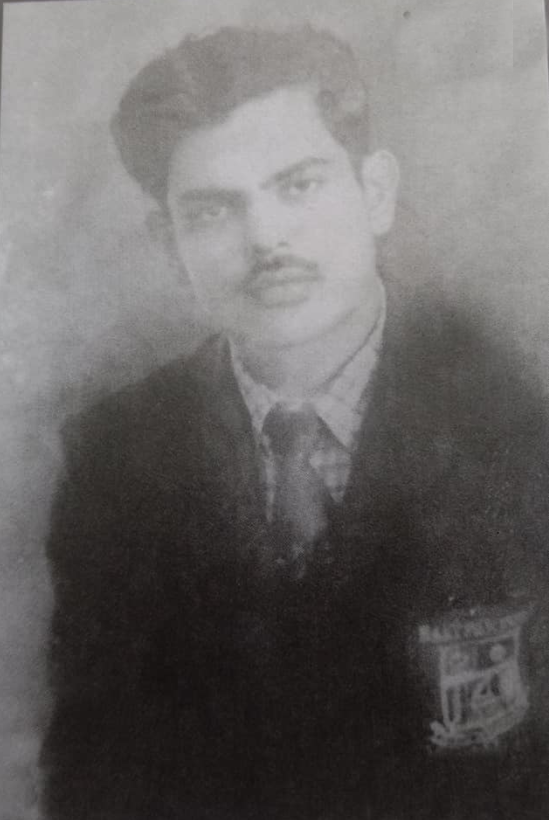
- Das in 1955

Personal information
- Date of birth: 29 October 1932
- Place of birth: Sylhet, Bengal Presidency, British India
- Date of death: 2 February 2026 (aged 93)
- Place of death: Sylhet, Bangladesh
- Height: 1.63 m (5 ft 4 in)
- Position: Goalkeeper

Senior career*
Years	Team	Apps	(Gls)
1955	Ispahani Club		
1956–1958	Azad Sporting Club		
1958–1959	Dhaka Mohammedan		
1960–1964	Azad Sporting Club		

International career
1955–1961	East Pakistan		

Managerial career
- 1968: East Pakistan Youth
- Azad Sporting Club
- * Club domestic league appearances and goals

Ranjit Das (Bengali: রণজিৎ দাস; 29 October 1932 – 2 February 2026) was a Bangladeshi football player and coach. He represented the East Pakistan football team from 1955 to 1961, and also served as captain of Chittagong Division team.

== Early life ==
Das was born on 29 October 1932 in Sylhet, Bengal Presidency, British India, the fifth and youngest child of Kamala Kant Das and Vasantilata Das. In 1947, he got an opportunity to play cricket for Town Club. Nonetheless, his cricket career ended following the 1947 Sylhet referendum in British India, as a large part of the elite body who managed cricket moved to India, while Sylhet became part of Pakistan.

== Club career ==
=== Early career ===
On 7 August 1954, Das represented Town Club in the final of a local tournament against United Friends Club in Habiganj. His team won the game 1–0, with Das's performance against the opposing team's striker, Balai Das, a member of the East Pakistan football team, standing out. Following the game, he was offered a position to play for Merchant Club and crossed the border to Agartala, where his team drew goalless in an exhibition game against hosts Birendra Club. This game was observed by S. D. Burman, who later praised Das's performance. In 1955, East Bengal Club from Kolkata played an invitational match in Comilla. Das, representing the hosts, Comilla XI, kept a clean sheet in a 3–0 victory. In the same year, he represented Ispahani Club in the Dhaka First Division League and played four games before the league was suspended due to flooding.

=== Azad Sporting Club ===
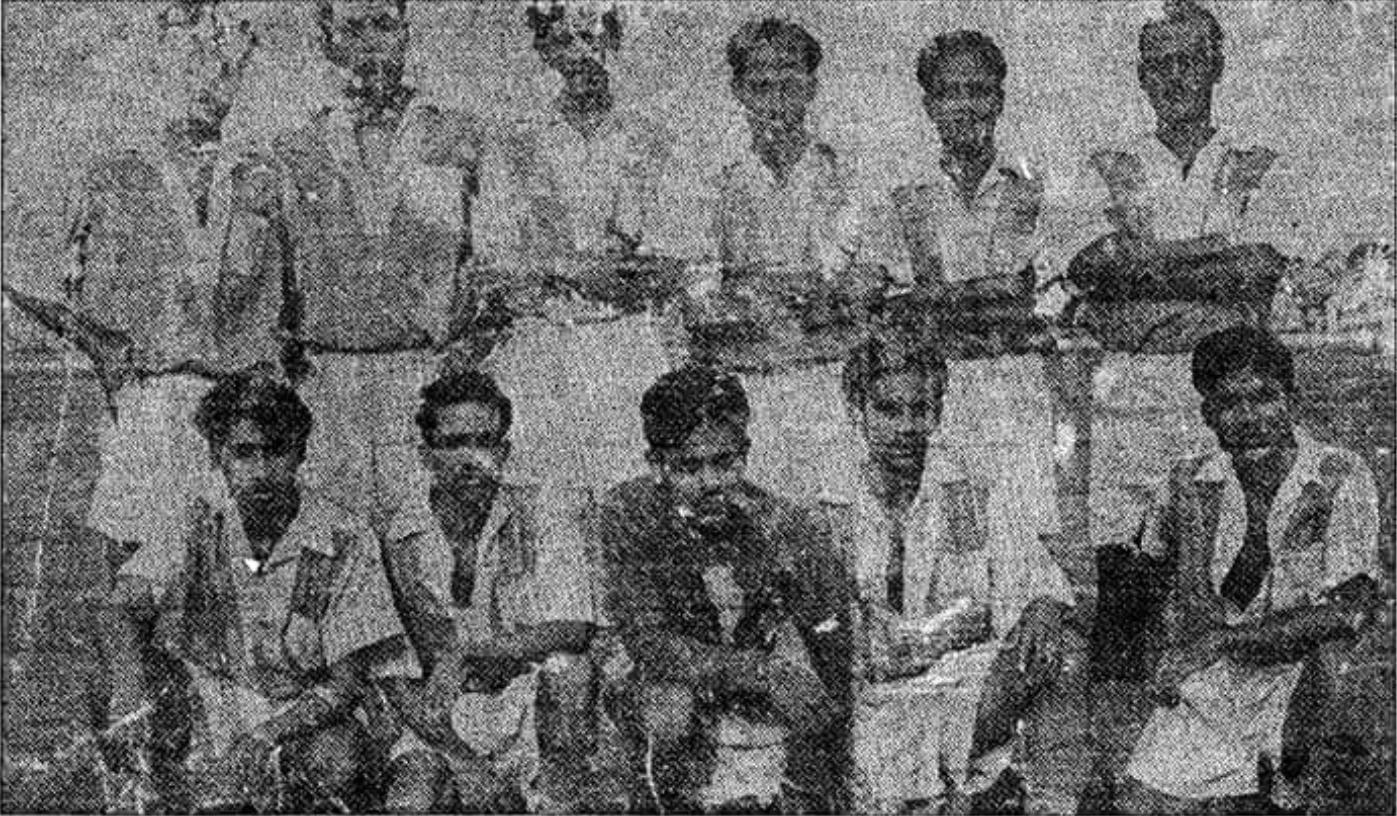
Das (sitting third from the left) with Azad Sporting Club, champions of the 1958 Dhaka First Division League

In 1956, Das joined Azad Sporting Club, a team that was composed entirely of Bengali players at the time. He captained the team in 1957 and 1958, and during the latter year led them to their sole First Division title. The team, which included notable players such as S. A. Jamman Mukta, Tajul Islam Manna, Khandoker Abul Hasan, and other representatives of the East Pakistan football team, managed to outperform traditional giants Dhaka Mohammedan and Dhaka Wanderers. They secured the league title with a 3–2 victory in the play-off game against Central Station & Printing Press.

=== Dhaka Mohammedan ===
In 1958, Das represented Dhaka Mohammedan at the IFA Shield in Kolkata. The team reached the quarter-finals but eventually lost 3–0 to Kolkata Mohammedan. Nonetheless, due to his impressive performances, he was acquired as a guest player by the Kolkata-based side for the 1957 Durand Cup held in Delhi. Prior to that, Das had represented Tripura XI in the IFA Shield. He was also part of the Dhaka Mohammedan team, which won both the First Division and the 1959 Aga Khan Gold Cup title.

=== East Pakistan ===
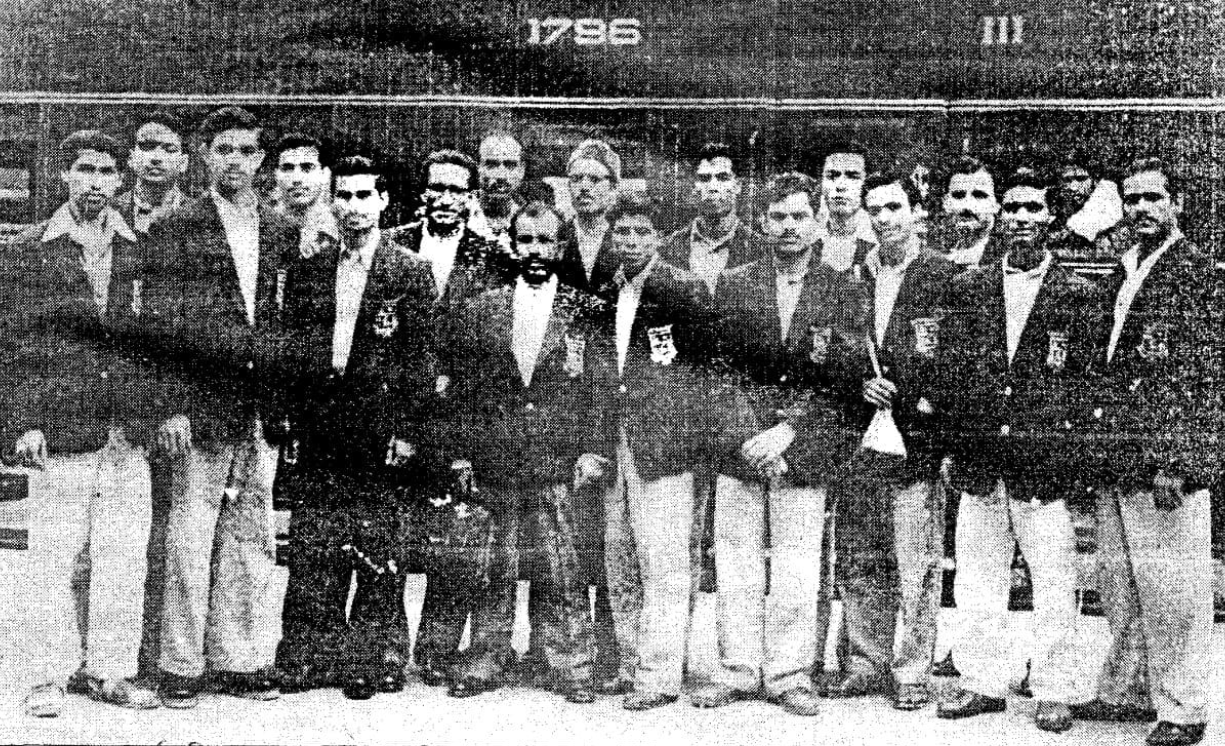
Das (fourth from right; front row) with the 1955 National Championship bound East Pakistan football team

Das first represented the East Pakistan football team at the sixth National Football Championship held in Bahawalpur. His team exited the tournament from the quarter-finals after suffering a 3–1 defeat to Baluchistan on 21 November 1955. He was also an integral part of the East Pakistan Whites, the eventual runners-up at the eighth National Football Championship held in Dhaka. The team captained by Mari Chowdhury, lost the final 2–1 to Punjab on 10 November 1957.

In the ninth National Football Championship, held in Multan, the East Pakistan team was knocked out by Punjab Reds, the junior side of the defending champions, Punjab, losing 3–1 in the match played on 15 November 1958; vice-captain Das’s lack of height was blamed for misjudging aerial clearances that led to the concession of the first two goals. In the tenth National Football Championship, held in Hyderabad, East Pakistan lost the final to Baluchistan on 7 November 1959, with Das again blamed for the defeat after conceding a long-range goal that proved to be the only goal of the match.

Das was made second-choice goalkeeper to Muhammad Siddiq, who hailed from Quetta, at the eleventh National Football Championship held in Karachi. The team eventually went on to win their maiden title by defeating Karachi White 1–0 in the final held on 27 November 1960.

=== Retirement ===
In 1960, Das returned to Azad Sporting Club. He represented the club in the Aga Khan Gold Cup that year and went on to spend the following four years as a player-cum-coach. From 1962 to 1964, he represented the Chittagong Division in the National Football Championship, serving as captain during the first two years. In 1963 and 1964, Das coached Khandoker Mohammad Nurunnabi, who became Azad's first-choice goalkeeper, eventually overtaking Das's position.

== International career ==
On 14 December 1955, Ranjit represented East Pakistan in an exhibition match against the Pakistan national team. His team were defeated 1–3. On 14 December 1957, Das represented East Pakistan Sports Federation XI in an exhibition match against Kolkata Mohammedan in Dhaka. He produced a man of the match performance in a 1–1 draw, denying the likes of Abid Ghazi and Mohammed Rahmatullah on numerous occasions. On 5 April 1958, Das was among six players from East Pakistan selected by the PFF for a training camp in preparation for the Tokyo Asian Games. Nonetheless, he failed to make the final squad.

In 1961, Das represented East Pakistan XI in two exhibition matches against the Burma national team. The first game held on 17 January in Dhaka, ended in a 0–3 defeat, while the second match held in Chittagong on 25 January, saw East Pakistan suffer a 1–9 defeat. The hosts scored their only goal through winger Liton.

== Coaching career ==
In 1968, Das coached the East Pakistan Youth football team to a runners-up place in the Pakistan National Youth Football Championship (East Zone). In the final held at Mymensingh Stadium, his team lost 0–1 to East Pakistan Combined University. He also served as the head coach of Azad Sporting Club in the 1970s.

== Post-retirement ==
Following the foundation of the Bangladesh Football Federation (BFF) on 15 July 1972, Das was elected as its Joint Secretary. He played a major role in selecting the first Bangladesh national football team in 1973, alongside Nabi Chowdhury, Sheikh Shaheb Ali and Manzur Hasan Mintu. In 1981, he was again nominated as a member of the federation's executive committee.

== Hockey career ==
Das joined the National Bank of Pakistan as an officer in 1959. He also played as a goalkeeper for the bank's field hockey team and won the Dhaka First Division League in both 1963 and 1965. In 1967, he got a chance to play for the East Pakistan hockey team and was eventually appointed the team's captain the following year. He represented the team in the Pakistan National Hockey Championship. Ranijit retired from the game after representing the Sylhet hockey team in 1979.

== Death ==
Das died on 2 February 2026, at the age of 93, while undergoing treatment at Sylhet City Hospital after suffering a cardiac arrest. (Note: Many sources mislabel his age as "94".) He was survived by his wife, four daughters, and a son.

== Honours ==
Azad Sporting Club

- Dhaka First Division League: 1958

Dhaka Mohammedan

- Dhaka First Division League: 1959
- Aga Khan Gold Cup: 1959

East Pakistan

- National Championship: 1960

Individual

- National Sports Award: 2007
- Grameenphone – Prothom Alo Sports Lifetime award of the Year: 2006

== Bibliography ==
- Alam, Masud (2017). ফুটবলের গল্প ফুটবলারদের গল্প [The story of football the story of footballers] (in Bengali). Bishhoshahitto Bhobon. ISBN 9789849134688.
- Mahmud, Dulal (2014). পাকিস্তান জাতীয় দল বাঙালি খেলোয়াড় [Bengali players in the Pakistan national team] (in Bengali). Bishhoshahitto Bhobon.
- Mahmud, Dulal (2020). খেলার মাঠে মুক্তিযুদ্ধ [Liberation war in the playground] (in Bengali). Bishhoshahitto Bhobon. ISBN 978-984-8218-31-0.
