= 2019–20 Mohammedan SC (Dhaka) season =

Mohammedan SC
2019–20 season
- Managing Director: (Bangladesh) Golam Md Alamgir
- Head coach: (England) Sean Brendan Lane
- Stadium: Shaheed Dhirendranath Stadium, Comilla
- Bangladesh Premier League: 4th(Season Cancelled)
- Federation Cup: Semi Final
- Independence Cup: Not held
- Top goalscorer: League: 3 goals (Nigeria) Ugochukwu Obi Moneke; All: 4 goals (Mali) Souleymane Diabate
- Biggest win: Dhaka Mohammedan 4–1 Uttar Baridhara SC (14 March 2020)
- Biggest defeat: Dhaka Mohammedan 0–4 Dhaka Abahani (4 March 2020)

The 2019–20 season was Mohammedan SC's 12th competitive season. The season began on 13 February 2020 and was suspended on 15 March 2020, due to the COVID-19 pandemic in the Bangladesh. On 17 May 2020, the league was declared void by the BFF executive committee.

== Current squad ==
Dhaka Mohammedan squad for 2019–20 season.

Note: Flags indicate national team as defined under FIFA eligibility rules; some limited exceptions apply. Players may hold more than one non-FIFA nationality.

No.	Pos.	Nation	Player
1	GK	BAN	Mazharul Islam Himel (Captain)
4	DF	MLI	Ousmane Berthe
5	DF	NGR	Stanley Onyekachi Amadi
6	MF	BAN	Anik Hossain
7	MF	BAN	Habibur Rahman Shohag
8	MF	BAN	Shamol Bapari
9	FW	BAN	Aminur Rahman Sajib
10	FW	MLI	Souleymane Diabate
11	MF	BAN	Yousuf Sifat
12	MF	BAN	Sahed Hossain
13	GK	BAN	Ahsan Habib Bipu
14	MF	BAN	Anik Ghosh
15	DF	BAN	Mohammad Atiquzzaman
16	MF	NGR	Ugochukwu Obi Moneke
17	MF	BAN	Mohammad Mithu
18	FW	BAN	Ousai Mong Marma
19	MF	JPN	Uryu Nagata (2nd captain)
20	MF	BAN	Sayed Rakib Khan Evan
21	MF	BAN	Farhad Mona
22	GK	BAN	Jasim Uddin
23	DF	BAN	Mohammed Abid Hossain
24	DF	BAN	Masud Rana Mredha
25	DF	BAN	Humayun Kabir Khan
26	MF	BAN	Sohanur Rahman
27	MF	BAN	Rumon Hossain
28	DF	BAN	Kamrul Islam
29	FW	BAN	Amir Hakim Bappy
30	GK	BAN	Mohammad Sujon
32	DF	BAN	Emon Khan
33	DF	BAN	Sadekujaman Fahim

== Competitions ==
Competition	First match	Last match	Starting round	Final position	Record							
Competition	First match	Last match	Starting round	Final position	Pld	W	D	L	GF	GA	GD	Win %
BPL	13 February 2020	14 March 2020	Matchday 1	4th(season cancelle)	6	4	0	2	8	7	+1	66.67
Federation Cup	19 December 2019	2 January 2020	Semi Final	Group Stage	5	2	2	1	4	2	+2	40.00
Independence Cup	-	-	Not held	-	0	0	0	0	0	0	+0	—
Total					11	6	2	3	12	9	+3	54.55

Last updated: 15 February 2020
Source: UNB

=== Group D ===
Pos	Team	Pld	W	D	L	GF	GA	GD	Pts	Qualification
1	Muktijoddha SKC	3	1	2	0	4	3	+1	5	Quarter-Finals
2	Dhaka Mohammedan	3	1	2	0	2	1	+1	5	Quarter-Finals
3	Sheikh Russel KC	3	1	2	0	2	1	+1	5	
4	Uttar Baridhara SC	3	0	0	3	1	4	−3	0	

Source: Soccerway

20 December 2019 2019 Bangladesh Federation Cup Group stage	Muktijoddha Sangsad KC	1–1	Dhaka Mohammedan	Dhaka
18:15 UTC+6:00	Ashik 34'	Report	Bappy 3'	Stadium: Bangabandhu National Stadium; Referee: Ferdous Ahmed

24 December 2019 2019 Bangladesh Federation Cup Group stage	Dhaka Mohammedan	0–0	Sheikh Russel KC	Dhaka
18:15 BST		Report		Stadium: Bangabandhu National Stadium; Referee: Bovon Mohon Talukdar

28 December 2019 2019 Bangladesh Federation Cup Group stage	Dhaka Mohammedan	1–0	Uttar Baridhara SC	Dhaka
18:15 BST	Diabate 8'	Report		Stadium: Bangabandhu National Stadium; Referee: Mohammed Jalaluddin

=== Knockout stage ===
30 December 2019 2019 Bangladesh Federation Cup Quarter-Finals	Dhaka Mohammedan	2–0	Chittagong Abahani	Dhaka
18:30 BST	Shahed 25'; Diabate 30'	Report		Stadium: Bangabandhu National Stadium; Referee: Bhovon Mohon Talukdar

2 January 2020 2019 Bangladesh Federation Cup Semi-Finals	Dhaka Mohammedan	0–1	Rahmatganj MFS	Dhaka
16:00 BST		Report	Turaev 16'	Stadium: Bangabandhu National Stadium; Referee: Mohammed Jalaluddin

=== Premier League ===
==== League table ====
Pos	Team	Pld	W	D	L	GF	GA	GD	Pts
2	Chittagong Abahani Ltd.	6	4	1	1	13	7	+6	13
3	Lt. Sheikh Jamal DC	5	4	0	1	10	5	+5	12
4	Dhaka Mohammedan SC Ltd.	6	4	0	2	8	7	+1	12
5	Saif Sporting Club	6	3	2	1	8	5	+3	11
6	Bashundhara Kings	6	3	1	2	10	9	+1	10

Source: Soccerway
Rules for classification: 1) Points; 2) Goal difference; 3) Goals scored.

==== Results summary ====
Overall								Home						Away					
Pld	W	D	L	GF	GA	GD	Pts	W	D	L	GF	GA	GD	W	D	L	GF	GA	GD
6	4	0	2	8	7	+1	12	1	0	0	1	0	+1	3	0	2	7	7	0

Last updated: 16 March 2020.
Source: Soccerway

==== Results by round ====
Round	1	2	3	4	5	6	7	8	9	10	11	12	13	14	15	16	17	18	19	20	21	22
Ground	A	A	A	A	H	A																
Result	W	L	W	L	W	W																
Position	4	6	6	6	6	4																

Updated to match(es) played on 13 March 2020. Source: Matches
A = Away; H = Home; W = Win; D = Draw; L = Loss; P = Postponed

==== Matches ====
14 February 2020 1	Arambagh KS	0-1	Dhaka Mohammedan	Dhaka
18:30 UTC+6:00		Report	Moneke 30'	Stadium: Bangabandhu National Stadium; Referee: M. Nahid (Bangladesh)

17 February 2020 2	Saif Sporting Club	1-0	Dhaka Mohammedan	Mymensingh
15:15 UTC+6:00	Arafat 55'	Report		Stadium: Rafiq Uddin Bhuiyan Stadium; Referee: M. Rahman (Bangladesh)

24 February 2020 3	Sheikh Russel KC	1-2	Dhaka Mohammedan	Sylhet
18:30 UTC+6:00	Henrique 42'	Report	Diabate 6'; Hossain 86'	Stadium: Sylhet District Stadium; Referee: A. Rahman (Bangladesh)

4 March 2020 4	Dhaka Abahani	4-0	Dhaka Mohammedan	Dhaka
18:30 UTC+6:00	Belfort 16', 43'; Bernhardt 33'; Jibon 64'	Report		Stadium: Bangabandhu National Stadium; Referee: B. Torofdar (Bangladesh)

7 March 2020 5	Dhaka Mohammedan	1-0	Bashundhara Kings	Comilla
15:15 UTC+6:00	Moneke 25'	Report		Stadium: Shaheed Dhirendranath Stadium; Referee: Jalaluddun (Bangladesh)

14 March 2020 6	Uttar Baridhara SC	1-4	Dhaka Mohammedan	Dhaka
18:30 UTC+6:00	Ahmed 53'	Report	Reza 31' (o.g.); Bappy 71'; Diabate 76'; Moneke 90+3'	Stadium: Bangabandhu National Stadium; Referee: B. Raz (Bangladesh)

7	v

8	v

9	v

10	v

11	v

12	v

13	v

14	v

15	v

16	v

17	v

18	v

19	v

20	v

21	v

22	v

23	v

24	v

== Statistics ==
=== Goals ===
As of matches played till 14 March 2020

Rank	Player	Position	Total	BPL	Federation Cup	Independence Cup
1	(Mali) Souleymane Diabate	FW	4	2	2	-
2	(Nigeria) Ugochukwu Obi Moneke	FW	3	3	0	-
3	(Bangladesh) Sahed Hossain	MF	2	1	1	-
4	(Bangladesh) Amir Hakim Bappy	FW	2	1	1	-
Total			11	7	4	
