= Grameenphone Prothom-alo sports awards =

Grameenphone - Prothom Alo Sports Awards
- Awarded for: Excellence in sports
- Sponsored by: Grameenphone
- Location: Ruposhi Bangla Hotel, Dhaka
- Country: Bangladesh
- Presented by: Prothom Alo
- First award: 2005
- Final award: 2012
- Currently held by: Shakib Al Hasan

The Grameenphone Prothom Alo Sports Awards ceremony that takes place annually since 2005. The award jury formed by five reputed sports persons of country.

The five categories for the award are as follows..

- Grameenphone - Prothom Alo Sports Person of the Year
- Grameenphone - Prothom Alo Sports Runners-up of the Year
- Grameenphone - Prothom Alo Sport Woman of the Year
- Grameenphone - Prothom Alo Sports Lifetime award of the Year
- Grameenphone - Prothom Alo Best Emerging sports Person of the Year

The winners of Lifetime Achievement and Sportsperson of the Year each received Tk 1 lakh and the other winners got Tk 50,000 each.

== Winners ==
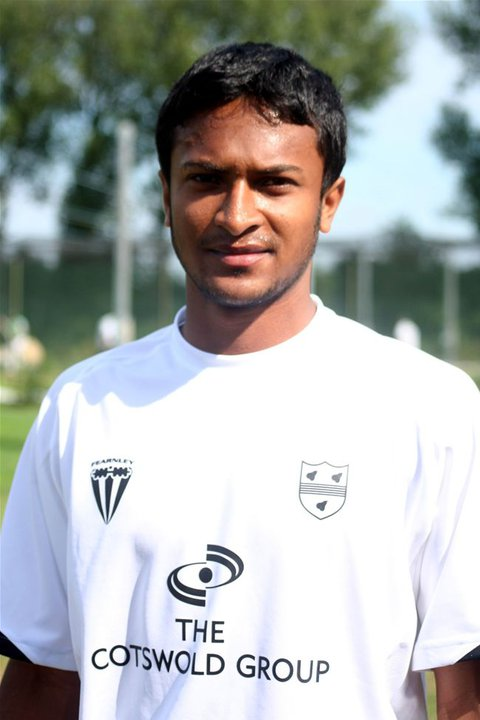
Shakib Al Hasan, three times Grameenphone-Prothom Alo sports person of the year award winner

=== Sports Person of the year ===
Year	Sports Person of the year		Runners-up of the year	
Year	Name	Sport	Name	Sport
2011	Shakib Al Hasan	Cricket	Siddikur Rahman	Golf
2011	Shakib Al Hasan	Cricket	Salma Khatun	Cricket
2010	Siddikur Rahman	Golf	Tamim Iqbal	Cricket
2010	Siddikur Rahman	Golf	Sharmin Aktar Ratna	Shooting
2009	Shakib Al Hasan	Cricket	Tamim Iqbal	Cricket
2009	Shakib Al Hasan	Cricket	Akashi Sultana	-
2008	Shakib Al Hasan	Cricket	Fahima Akhter Moyna	Weightlifting
2008	Shakib Al Hasan	Cricket	Asif Hossain Khan	Shooting
2007	Mohammad Ashraful	Cricket	Ziaur Rahman	Kabaddi
2007	Mohammad Ashraful	Cricket	Enamul Hossain Rajib	Chess
2006	Shahriar Nafees	Cricket	Mashrafee bin Mortuza	Cricket
2006	Shahriar Nafees	Cricket	Mahfuzur Rahman Mithu	Athletics
2005	Habibul Bashar	Cricket	Mohammad Ashraful	Cricket
2005	Habibul Bashar	Cricket	Mohammed Sujan	Football

=== Woman of the year ===
Year	Woman of the year	
Year	Name	Sport
2012	Molla Shabira Sultana	Weightlifting
2011	Khadijatul Kobra	Cricket
2009	Babita Khatun	Swimming
2008	Salma Khatun	Cricket
2007	Shamsunahar Beauty	Athletics
2006	Fouzia Huda Jui	Athletics
2005	Molla Shabira Sultana	Weightlifting

=== Lifetime award of the Year ===
Year	Lifetime award of the year	
Year	Name	Sport
2011	Sayed Altaf Hossain	Cricket
2010	Rani Hamid	Chess
2009	Kabir Ahmed	Football
2008	Bashir Ahmed	Football, Hockey & Athletics
2007	Abul Hasan	Volleyball, Football & Athletics
2006	Ranjit Das	Football, Hockey & Cricket
2005	Chinghla Mong Chowdhury Mari	Football
2012	Zahirul Haque	Football

=== Best Emerging award of the Year ===
Year	Best Emerging award of the Year	
Year	Name	Sport
2008	Minhazuddin Ahmed Sagar	Chess
2007	Tamim Iqbal	Cricket
2006	Sakib Al Hasan	Cricket
2005	Zahid Hasan Ameli	Football
