= Chinghla Mong Chowdhury Mari =

Bangladeshi footballer (1938–2012)

Mari Chowdhury
- Mari after reitirement

Personal information
- Full name: Chinghla Mong Chowdhury Mari
- Date of birth: 29 September 1938
- Place of birth: Rangamati, Bengal, British India (present-day Bangladesh)
- Date of death: 9 May 2012 (aged 73)
- Place of death: Dhaka, Bangladesh
- Positions: Left winger; striker

Senior career*
| Years | Team | Apps | (Gls) |
| 1956 | Azad SC | | |
| 1957–1958 | Mohammedan SC | | |
| 1959–1960 | Dhaka Wanderers | | |
| 1961–1962 | Mohammedan SC | | |
| 1963–1965 | Azad SC | | |
| 1966–1967 | EPIDC | | |

International career
| 1959 | East Pakistan | | |
| 1956–1958 | Pakistan | | |

Managerial career
- 1982–1986: BRTC SC
- * Club domestic league appearances and goals

Chinghla Mong Chowdhury Mari (Bengali: চিং হ্লা মং চৌধুরী মারী; 29 September 1938 – 10 May 2012), commonly known as Mari Chowdhury, was a Bangladeshi football player who played as a left-winger. He is considered to be the best East Pakistani footballer of all time, and one of the few East Pakistanis to play for the Pakistan national team.

Despite the fact that most of his goals are unregistered, Mari is the unrecognised all-time top scorer in both Dhaka First Division League and Bangladesh top-tier football history with 234 goals.

== Early life ==
Mari was born in Chandraghona, Rangamati on 29 September 1938. He lost his father at a young age, and was raised by his mother. Mari's mother, Occho Moyee, and father, Pastor Thysau Chowdhury, were from the Bomang Royal Family but were expelled from the royal family for converting to Christianity. Mari was the youngest in a family of three brothers and one sister.

Mari's school life began at the Baptist Mission Boys School in Barishal. In 1951, Mari played for Firingi Bazar in the Chittagong League while still in tenth grade. The following year, he played league football for Chittagong Medical School. Mari completed his HSC from Jagannath University in 1956 and finished his studies from the same university in 1959.

== Career ==
=== Player ===
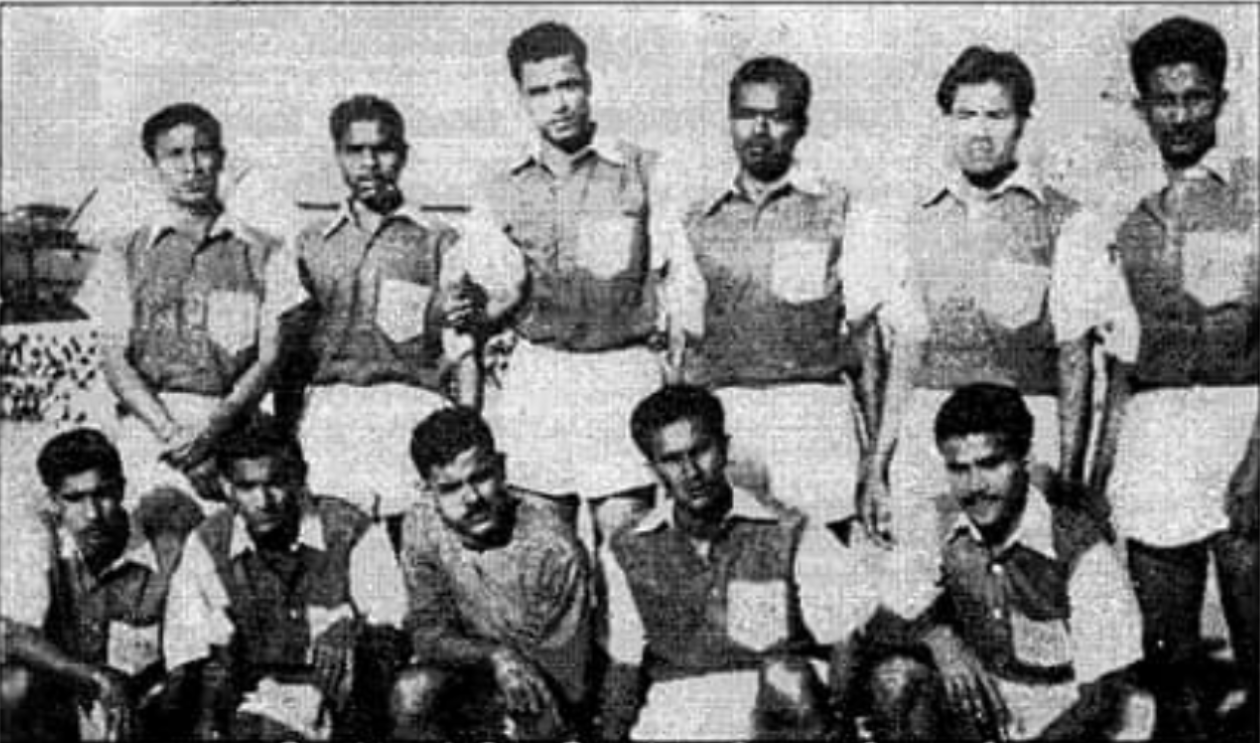
Mari standing second from right with Chittagong Division in 1961.

Mari represented Barisal District and East Bengal Railway in the Ronaldshay Shield in 1951 and 1952 respectively. He spent five consecutive seasons playing in the Chittagong League, before moving to Azad Sporting Club in the Dhaka First Division in 1956. The same year, Mari and Nabi Chowdhury, were the only Bengali footballers to find a place in the Pakistan national team for two friendlies against Singapore and Ceylon. In the 1957 National Football Championship, the East Pakistan White team captained by Mari finished runners-up, losing to Punjab 2–1 in the final. Mari was named the best player of the tournament.

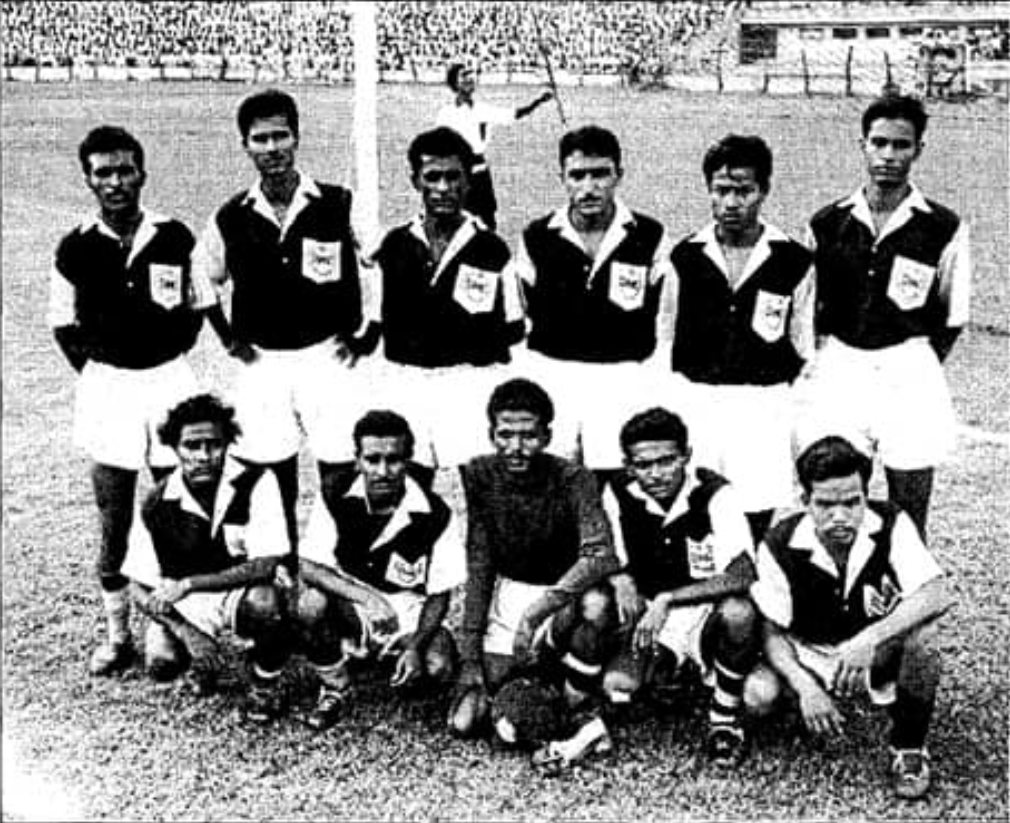
Mari standing fifth from left with Dhaka Wanderers Club in 1960.

You have not seen Mari brother play. I saw, I played with him. He was an indescribable thing. If the body is bent even a little, two or three of the opponent's players would fall to the ground after being dodged! He was magical.

— Enayetur Rahman Khan, former Bangladesh national team striker, to Daily Janakantha in November 2021.

In 1958, the famous East Pakistani attacking trio of Kabir Ahmed, Ashraf Chowdhury and Mari caught the eye of India while representing Dhaka Mohammedan in the IFA Shield. The same attacking line represented Pakistan in the 1958 Asian Games in Tokyo, Japan. During the tournament, Mari suffered a knee injury. As a result, he walked away from the national team, however, he continued to play in the domestic league for another decade.

He went on to play for Azad Sporting Club, Dhaka Wanderers and EPIDC the latter being his final club in 1967. Aside from domestic football, Mari again played in the National Football Championship in 1959, with East Pakistan. He played for Dhaka Jagannath College in 1957–58 and won the Sir AF Rahman Shield and Governors Cup for them.

In 1959, Mari represented EPSF XI (East Pakistan) in two exhibition matches against the Pakistan national team. The first game held on 18 April, ended in a 0–7 defeat, while the second match on 14 May, saw EPSF XI suffer a 1–2 defeat.

Mari also appeared in the Aga Khan Gold Cup, notably as a guest player for Victoria SC and Chittagong Port Trust in 1958 and 1962, respectively.

=== Coach ===
Following the Independence of Bangladesh, he served as the head coach of Team BJMC (formerly EPIDC), Bangladesh Government Press and Bangladesh Trading Corporation. In 1982, he guided BRTC Sports Club to promotion to the First Division as champions of the Dhaka Second Division League. He remained as the head coach of the club until 1986, and had a fairly successful stint coaching in the top-tier.

== Career statistics ==
=== International ===
Scores and results list Pakistan's goal tally first.

| # | Date | Venue | Opponent | Score | Result | Competition | Ref. |
|---|---|---|---|---|---|---|---|
| 1 | 14 May 1958 | Stadium Merdeka, Kuala Lumpur, Federation of Malaya | Malaya | 2–4 | 2–4 | Friendly | |
| 2 | 17 May 1958 | Jalan Besar Stadium, Kallang, Singapore | Singapore | 2–3 | 4–4 | Friendly | |

== Honours ==
=== Player ===
Mohammedan SC

- Dhaka First Division League: 1957, 1961

Dhaka Wanderers Club

- Dhaka First Division League: 1960

EPIDC

- Dhaka First Division League: 1967

East Pakistan White

- National Championship runner-up: 1957

East Pakistan

- National Championship runner-up: 1959

=== Manager ===
BRTC Sports Club

- Dhaka Second Division League: 1982

=== Awards and accolades ===
- 1981 − National Sports Awards
- 2005 − Grameenphone - Prothom Alo Sports Lifetime award of the Year

== Personal life and legacy ==
Mari, was also involved in other sports, in 1954, he won gold in high jump and silver in 100m sprint at the National Olympics for Pakistan. Mari was a regular member of the East Pakistan Volleyball team and also captained the side.

During the Bangladesh Liberation War in 1971, he served as captain of Sector 1 in Agartala and later as Quartermaster under Major Ziaur Rahman, for nine months.

He was married to late Indulekha Mari (renowned sports journalist-Kira Jagat Magazine) with three sons (Eldest-Hla Sumon Chowdhury Mari, Middle-Hla Mong Bobby Mari, Youngest-Hlaching Mong Issac Mari).

Mari received the National Sports Awards, in 1981. In 2001, Mari was given a special award as the Best Footballer from the Rangamati Hill District Council.

On 9 May 2012, Mari died, while being admitted at the Holy Family Hospital. He had been suffering from Alzheimer's since 2008, and also had skin cirrhoses, which forced him to be hospitalised. He left behind a wife and three sons.

In 2012, the National Sports Council changed the name of the Rangamati Stadium to Ching Lah Mong Chowdhury Murruy Rangamati Stadium, to commemorate the late footballer. In February 2020, a mural of the Mari was inaugurated in Rangamati.

== Bibliography ==
- Mahmud, Dulal (2014). পাকিস্তান জাতীয় দল বাঙালি খেলোয়াড় (transl. Bengali players in the Pakistan national team) (in Bengali). Bishhoshahitto Bhobon.
- Alam, Masud (2017). ফুটবলের গল্প ফুটবলারদের গল্প (transl. The story of football the story of footballers) (in Bengali). Bishhoshahitto Bhobon. ISBN 9789849134688.
- Mahmud, Dulal (2020). খেলার মাঠে মুক্তিযুদ্ধ (transl. Liberation war in the playground) (in Bengali). Bishhoshahitto Bhobon. ISBN 978-984-8218-31-0.
