= Ashraf Chowdhury =

Bangladeshi footballer and coach

- Ashraf post-retirement

Personal information
- Date of birth: c. 1935
- Place of birth: Daudkandi, Comilla District, British India (present-day Bangladesh)
- Date of death: 28 December 1998 (aged 63)
- Place of death: Dhaka, Bangladesh
- Position: Centre-forward

Senior career*
| Years | Team | Apps | (Gls) |
| 1950 | Wari Club | | |
| 1950 | Mohammedan | | |
| 1951–1952 | Wari | | |
| 1953 | Fire Service | | |
| 1954–1955 | Dhaka Wanderers | | |
| 1956–1963 | Mohammedan | | |

International career
| 1958 | Pakistan | | |

Managerial career
- 1975–1976: Mohammedan
- 1978–1979: Mohammedan
- 1981: Arambagh
- 1987: BRTC
- 1995–1998: Prantik
- * Club domestic league appearances and goals

Ashraf Chowdhury (Bengali: আশরাফ চৌধুরী; c. 1935 – 28 December 1998) was a Bangladeshi football player and coach.

== Early career ==
Ashraf was born in Daudkandi Upazila of Comilla District, British India. On 14 August 1947, he played for Lalmonirhat High School during an exhibition match against East Pakistan Railway. His performances led him to represent the eventual runners-up, Gaibandha Town Club, in the Cooch Behar Cup in India in 1949. During the tournament, he played alongside Goda Rashid of Wari Club Dhaka, who later brought Ashraf to the Dhaka-based club.

== Club career ==
In 1950, Ashraf joined Wari Club; however, he departed after being benched for the first three games. Eventually, he was brought to Dhaka Mohammedan by coach Abdus Sattar in the same year. Ashraf repaid his coach's faith by scoring in his Dhaka League debut against Wari Club. He returned to Wari in 1951 and remained at the club for two seasons.

In 1954, after spending a year at Fire Service, Ashraf joined Dhaka Wanderers Club. He won the league title with the Wanderers in both 1954 and 1955. Ashraf also represented the club in the IFA Shield during both years. However, after a fallout with the club's officials, Ashraf, along with nine other Wanderers players, joined Dhaka Mohammedan in 1956.

In 1957, Ashraf was made Mohammedan's captain, and in the same year, he led the club to its first league title. The following year, the attacking trio of Kabir Ahmed, Mari Chowdhury, and Ashraf helped Mohammedan reach the quarter-finals of the IFA Shield. In the quarter-final against Kolkata Mohammedan, the Dhaka side lost 0–3, with Ashraf missing the majority of the game due to injury. In 1959, he was the league's top scorer with 16 goals, including three hat-tricks, and again helped Mohammedan win the league title. In the same year, the club won the 1959 Aga Khan Gold Cup, with Ashraf scoring in a 2–0 victory over KMC in the final. Ashraf scored a total of 56 goals in all competitions that year. He remained club captain till 1960, during which the Black and Whites became one of the strongest teams on the continent.

=== East Pakistan ===
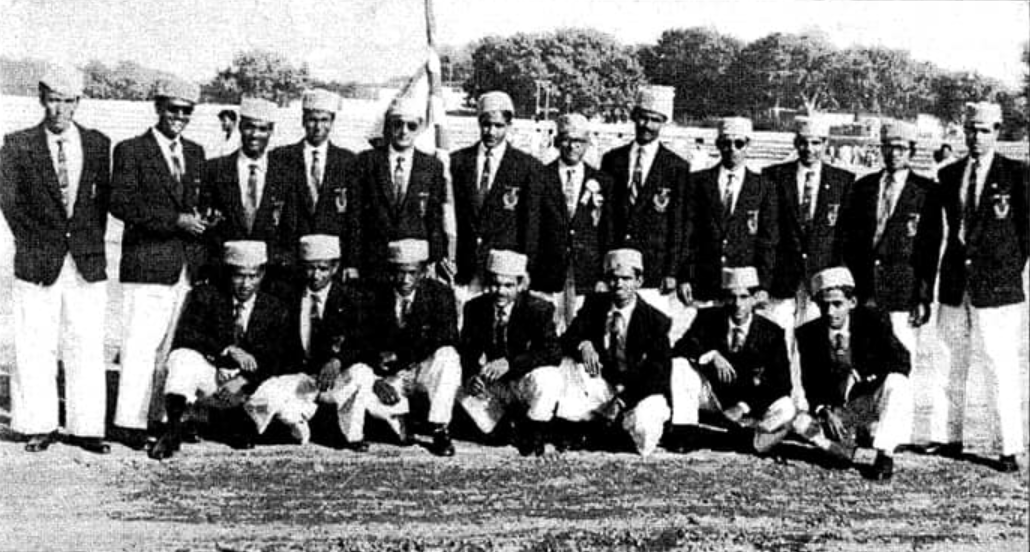
Ashraf sitting third from left with East Pakistan at 1959 National Football Championship in Hyderabad

Ashraf made his debut for the East Pakistan football team at the National Football Championship held in Lahore in 1954. He was a regular face in the team until 1959, with his only absence being in 1958 due to an injury.

In 1957, he played an integral role alongside Kabir Ahmed and Mari Chowdhury as the East Pakistan White team finished runners-up in the National Championship held in Dacca. During the tournament, he scored a hat-trick against Pakistan Navy in a 5–2 victory, with the other goals being scored by Kabir Ahmed and Nabi Chowdhury. Prior to the final against Punjab, Ashraf was injured and was replaced by S.A. Jamman Mukta in the game, which was won 2–1 by Punjab.

In 1959, he was part of the team that again finished runners-up after being defeated by Balochistan 0–1 in the final held in Hyderabad on 7 November 1959.

== International career ==
Ashraf was one of the six Bengali played present in the Pakistan national team at the 1958 Tokyo Asian Games. The team, tied the first game 1–1 with South Vietnam and lost its final game 1–3 to the Republic of China. Prior to the tournament, he participated in exhibition matches against the likes of Malaya and Singapore.

== Coaching career ==
Following his retirement from playing in 1963, Ashraf distanced himself from football until Dhaka Mohammedan general secretary Moinul Islam appointed him as the club's head coach in 1975. Ashraf guided the club to consecutive First Division titles in 1975 and 1976. In his second stint as head coach in 1978, Ashraf again helped the Black and Whites win the league title. In 1981, he coached Arambagh KS to a runners-up finish in Nepal's ANFA Cup. In 1998, Ashraf guided Prantik KC to the Dhaka Second Division League title.

== Death ==
On 28 December 1998, only two weeks after receiving the National Sports Award, Ashraf died at the age of 63.

A local football tournament is regularly held in his memory in Daudkandi Upazila.

== Honours ==
=== Player ===
Mohammedan SC

- Dhaka First Division League: 1957, 1959, 1961, 1963
- Independence Day Tournament: 1958, 1959, 1961, 1963
- Aga Khan Gold Cup: 1959

Dhaka Wanderers

- Dhaka First Division League: 1954, 1955
- Independence Day Tournament: 1955

East Pakistan White

- National Championship runner-up: 1957

East Pakistan

- National Championship runner-up: 1959

=== Manager ===
Mohammedan SC

- Dhaka First Division League: 1975, 1976, 1978

Prantik KC

- Dhaka Second Division League: 1997–98
- Dhaka Third Division League: 1995

=== Individual ===
- 1959 − Dhaka First Division League top scorer
- 1998 − National Sports Award.

== Bibliography ==
- Mahmud, Dulal (2014). পাকিস্তান জাতীয় দল বাঙালি খেলোয়াড় (transl. Bengali players in the Pakistan national team) (in Bengali). Bishhoshahitto Bhobon.
- Mahmud, Dulal (2020). খেলার মাঠে মুক্তিযুদ্ধ (transl. Liberation war in the playground) (in Bengali). Bishhoshahitto Bhobon. ISBN 978-984-8218-31-0.
- Alam, Masud (2017). ফুটবলের গল্প ফুটবলারদের গল্প (transl. The story of football the story of footballers) (in Bengali). Bishhoshahitto Bhobon. ISBN 9789849134688.
