= Kabir Ahmed (footballer) =

Bangladeshi footballer

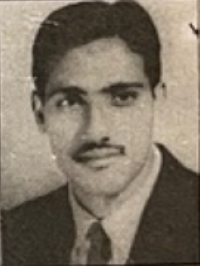
- Kabir post-retirement

Personal information
- Full name: Kabir Ahmed
- Date of birth: 2 February 1935
- Place of birth: Jhalokati, Bengal, British India (present-day Bangladesh)
- Date of death: 3 January 2019 (aged 83)
- Place of death: Dhaka, Bangladesh
- Height: 1.75 m (5 ft 9 in)
- Position: Right winger

Senior career*
Years	Team	Apps	(Gls)
1952–1954	BG Press		
1955	Dhaka Wanderers		
1956–1958	Mohammedan		
1959	Police AC		
1960–1966	Mohammedan		
1967	Victoria		

International career
1955–1963	East Pakistan		
1958–1960	Pakistan		

Managerial career
- 1972–1973: Abahani Krira Chakra
- * Club domestic league appearances and goals

Kabir Ahmed (Bengali: কবির আহমেদ; 2 February 1935 – 3 January 2019) was a Bangladeshi football player and coach. He was one of the few East Pakistani players to have represented the Pakistan national team. He was part of the legendary East Pakistani attacking trio alongside Mari Chowdhury and Ashraf Chowdhury.

== Club career ==
Kabir began his career with Town Club in the Barishal First Division in 1951. At 17, he joined Bengal Government Press and won the First Division League of Dhaka. In 1953, he played for Governors XI against Kolkata Mohammedan, during an exhibition match in Dhaka. In 1955, Kabir joined Dhaka Wanderers and won the league. The following year, he and several teammates joined Dhaka Mohammedan after a dispute with Wanderers authorities. At Mohammedan, Kabir won the league five times and the Aga Khan Gold Cup once. In 1958, led by Kabir, Mari Chowdhury, and Ashraf Chowdhury, Mohammedan reached the quarter-finals of India's IFA Shield. In 1959, he played for Police AC with national teammates Nabi Chowdhury and Zahirul Haque. He retired in 1967 due to a serious knee injury.

== International career ==
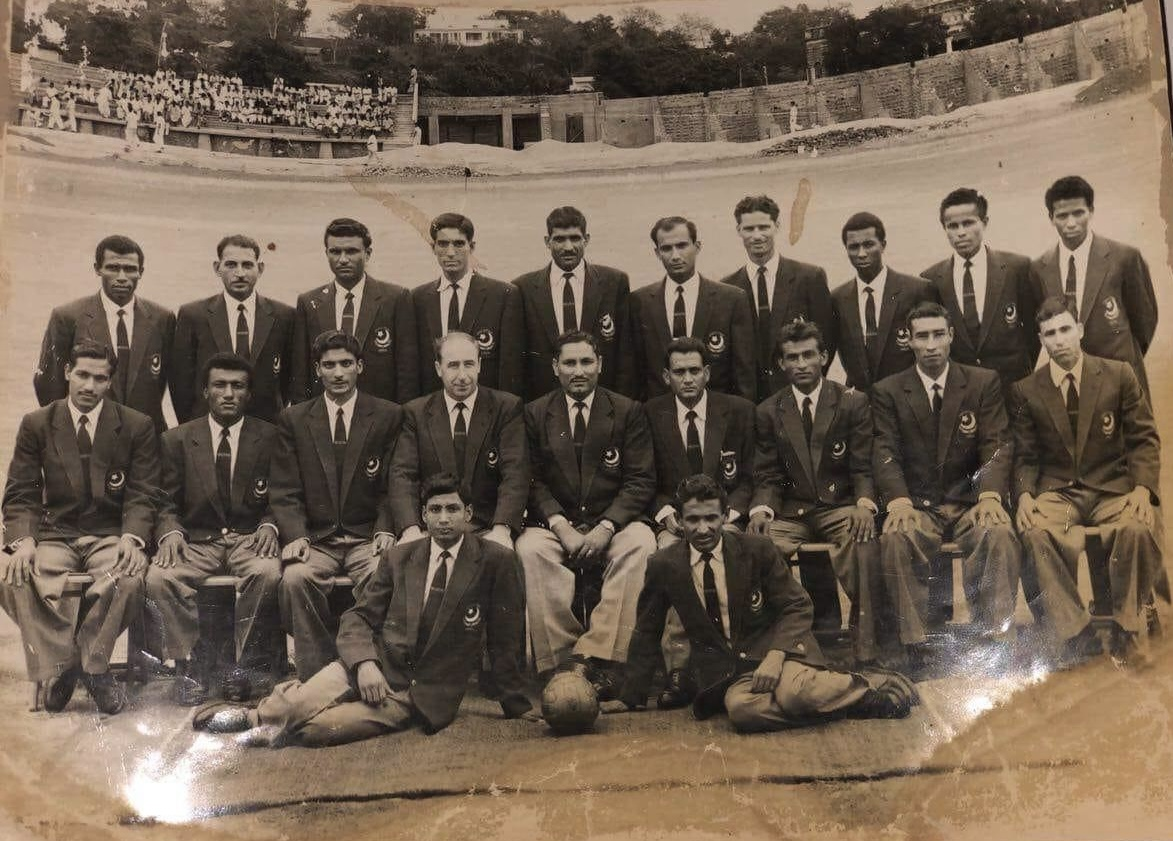
Kabir (seated first from left) with the Pakistan national team squad for the tour to Burma in 1959

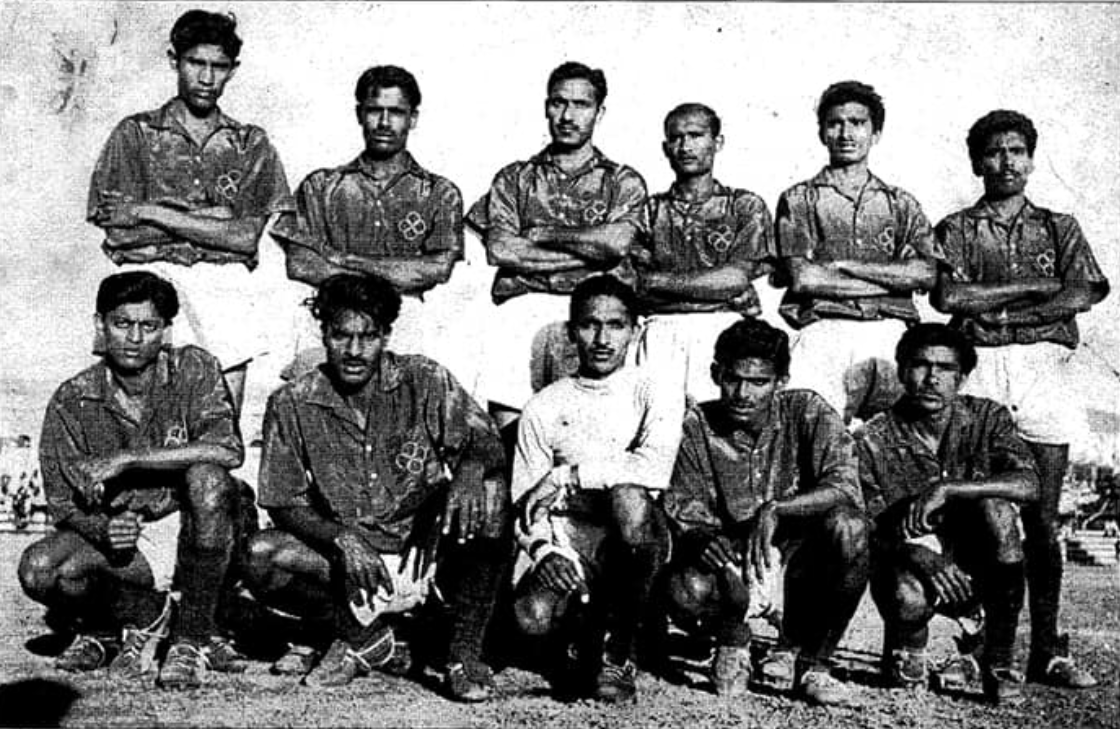
Khulna Divisional football team 1963, Kabir standing third from left

Kabir represented East Pakistan at the National Football Championship between 1955 and 1959. He captained the team in 1959 when they finished runners-up. He was among the six East Pakistani footballers in the Pakistan national team at the 1958 Asian Games in Tokyo, Japan and was also appointed as vice-captain. Before the tournament he played practice matches in Singapore and Malaysia. In 1959, he toured Burma and later that year also participated in the 1960 AFC Asian Cup qualifiers, in Kochi, India where he was appointed as vice-captain behind Qayyum Changezi. His last international tour came the following year, under a fellow East Pakistani, head coach Sheikh Shaheb Ali, as Pakistan finished in fourth place in the Merdeka Cup. Kabir captained Khulna Division in the National Championship from 1960 to 1963.

== Post–playing career ==
In 1966, Kabir joined the East Pakistan Sports Federation. Kabir, alongside coaches Sheikh Shaheb Ali and Rashid Chunna, was in-charge of recruiting players and coaches for the East Pakistan football team from different districts. In 1972, he was appointed the first ever head coach of Abahani Krira Chakra.

In 1979, he joined the ad hoc committee of the Bangladesh Football Federation (BFF) and in the same year he was appointed general manager of the national team during 1980 AFC Asian Cup qualification. He also served as an assistant to Amir Jang Ghaznavi as a team organizer and scout for Dhaka Mohammedan following his retirement. In 2001, he received the National Sports Awards, for his contribution to the country's football.

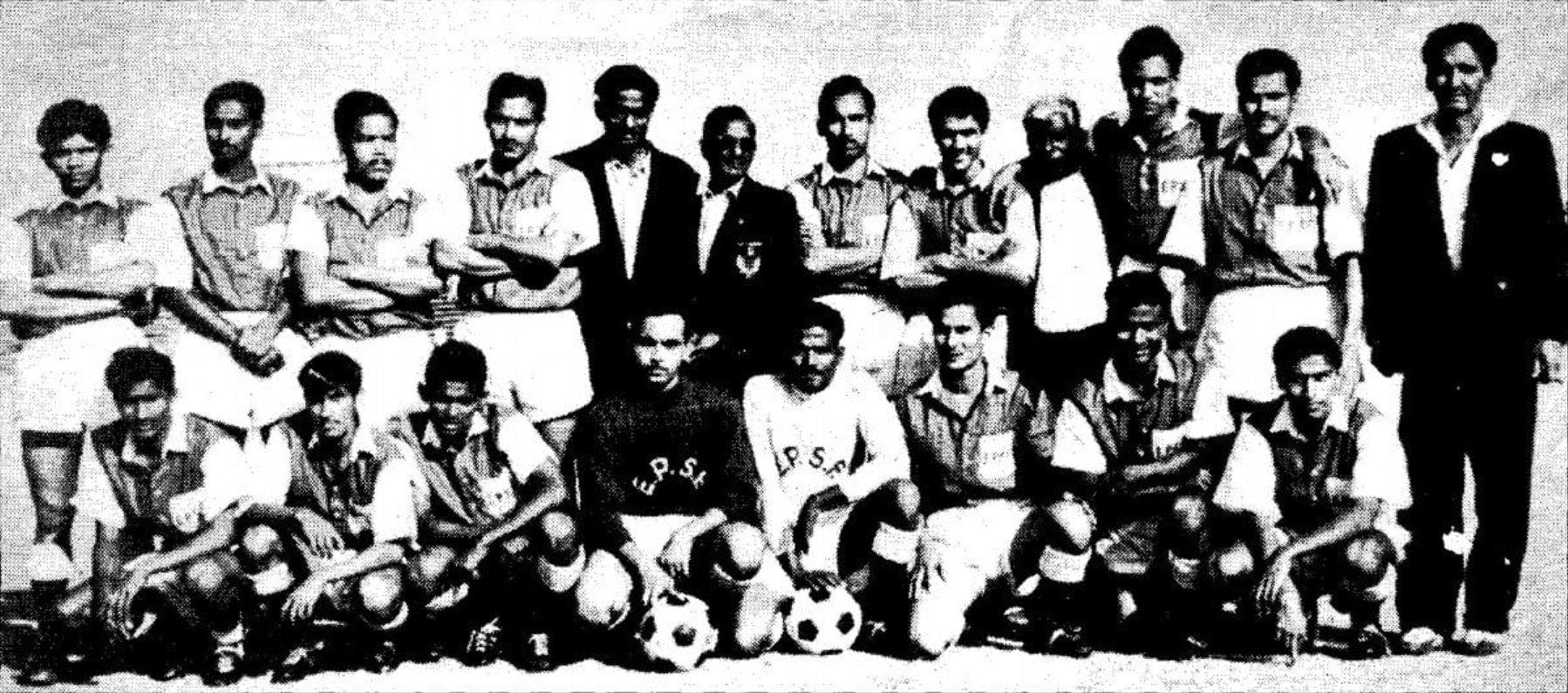
East Pakistan football team in 1963 before an exhibition game against China, Kabir standing fourth from left

== Death ==
Kabir died on 3 January 2019, at the age of 83. Following a stroke in 2001, he had been paralyzed for 17 years prior to his death. He was buried in the Azimpur graveyard, in Dhaka, Bangladesh.

== Career statistics ==
=== International ===
Scores and results list Pakistan's goal tally first, score column indicates score after each Kabir goal.

List of international goals scored by Kabir Ahmed
No.	Date	Venue	Opponent	Score	Result	Competition	Ref.
1	28 April 1959	Aung San Stadium, Rangoon, Burma	Burma	3–0	4–1	Friendly	
2	21 August 1960	Ikada Stadium, Jakarta, Indonesia	Indonesia		2–5	Friendly	

== Honours ==
BG Press SRC

- Dhaka First Division League: 1952

Dhaka Wanderers

- Dhaka First Division League: 1955
- Pakistan Day Football Tournament: 1955

Mohammedan SC

- Dhaka First Division League: 1957, 1961, 1963, 1965, 1966
- Aga Khan Gold Cup: 1964
- Independence Day Cup: 1958, 1960, 1961, 1963, 1966
- All-Pakistan Mohammad Ali Bogra Memorial Tournament : 1966

East Pakistan White

- National Football Championship runner-up: 1957

East Pakistan

- National Football Championship runner-up: 1959

=== Awards and accolades ===
- 2001 − National Sports Awards
- 2009 − Grameenphone - Prothom Alo Sports Lifetime award of the Year

== Bibliography ==
- Mahmud, Dulal (2014). পাকিস্তান জাতীয় দল বাঙালি খেলোয়াড় (transl. Bengali players in the Pakistan national team) (in Bengali). Bishhoshahitto Bhobon.
- Alam, Masud (2017). ফুটবলের গল্প ফুটবলারদের গল্প (transl. The story of football the story of footballers) (in Bengali). Bishhoshahitto Bhobon. ISBN 9789849134688.
- Mahmud, Dulal (2020). খেলার মাঠে মুক্তিযুদ্ধ (transl. Liberation war in the playground) (in Bengali). Bishhoshahitto Bhobon. ISBN 978-984-8218-31-0.
