= Masudur Rahman (referee) =

Bengali footballer and referee (1916–1967)

Personal information
- Date of birth: 5 September 1916
- Place of birth: Calcutta, British India
- Date of death: 20 June 1967 (aged 50)
- Place of death: Sir Salimullah Medical College, Dhaka
- Position: Goalkeeper

Senior career*
Years	Team	Apps	(Gls)
1932–1938	Kolkata Mohammedan		
1939–1946	Khulna Town Club		
1939–	East Bengal		
- Mohun Bagan
- * Club domestic league appearances and goals

Masudur Rahman alternatively spelled Masoodur Rahman (Bengali: মাসুদুর রহমান; 5 September 1916 – 20 June 1967) was a footballer who played as goalkeeper, after retirement, he became a FIFA referee.

== Early life ==
Rahman was born on 5 September 1916, In Calcutta, British India. He used to take a keen interest in games such as field hockey and football. He started his career as early as 1933.

== Football career ==
Rahman represented Calcutta Mohammedan from 1932 to 1938 in both football and hockey, before moving to Khulna Town Club and playing for them from 1939 till 1946. He also had a spell at East Bengal in 1939, and also played for Mohun Bagan till the Independence of Pakistan.

== Hockey career ==
Rahman played for clubs like Kolkata Mohammedan and the East Bengal field hockey team. He was selected as a goalkeeper to represent Bengal in the "All-India Inter-Provincial Hockey Championship" which was held in bombay in 1944. He also played for India XI in 1943 and also 1945. After Pakistan independence, he represented East Pakistan from 1952 till 1956, captaining the team on many occasions in the National Hockey Championship. Due to his experience he was appointed to coach the East Pakistan School Hockey XI in 1954. He briefly coached East Pakistan from the years 1958 and 1960–1961.

Alongside football and hockey, He participated in the "All-India Badminton Championship" from the years 1937 to 1943, In Athletics he assisted the Bengal Heroes.

== Refereeing career ==
Masud joined the East Pakistan referee Association in 1948. He also served as the manager of the Pakistan Basketball Team in the 2nd Asian Quadrangular Basketball Tournament in 1962. And served as a regular member leading the team.

He was a part of the Referee Association of England from 1957 to 1959. In 1959, he supervised matches at the 1960 AFC Asian Cup qualification. In 1960, he was the manager of the East Pakistan hockey team for their participation in the National Hockey Championship held in Hyderabad and also for an exhibition match against the Pakistan Olympic Hockey team.

The following year, he supervised the international friendly series against the touring Burma national team in East Pakistan. Due to his exceptional supervision, he was eventually awarded a FIFA Badge in 1962.

Masud also referred the 1959, 1960, and 1966 finals of the Aga Khan Gold Cup. Additionally, officiating the 1963 National Football Championship final. He acted as assistant manager and referee for Pakistan in the 1965 RCD Cup, where he performed as head referee of the final match of the tournament between Iran and Turkey. He also refereed matches at the 1964 Aga Khan Gold Cup.

== Personal life and death ==
Masudur Rahman had 8 children, He was admitted on 1 April 1967. It was later found that he was suffering from Leukemia. He underwent an operation on 28 April but with very little signs of improvement. Referees saved up around Rs.500 to donate to Masud. He died on 20 June 1967, at 4 pm. He was buried at Azimpur Graveyard.
