= Sean Lane (footballer) =

English footballer

Personal information
- Full name: Sean Brendan Lane
- Date of birth: 16 January 1964 (age 62)
- Place of birth: Bristol, England
- Positions: Striker; midfielder

Senior career*
Years	Team	Apps	(Gls)
1980–1983	Hereford United	61	(3)
1983–1984	Derby County	1	(0)
1984–1986	Preston Lions FC	54	(11)
1987–1990	Brunswick Zebras FC	38	(5)
1991–1992	Preston Lions FC	9	(1)
1992–1994	Brunswick Zebras FC	65	(15)
1994–1995	Preston Lions FC	50	(12)

International career
1985	Australia B	1	(0)

Managerial career
- 2016–2017: Brisbane Strikers FC
- 2017–2018: Gold Coast United FC
- 2018–2019: Gold Coast Knights FC (assistant)
- 2019–2022: Dhaka Mohammedan SC
- 2022: Gold Coast Knights FC (assistant)
- * Club domestic league appearances and goals

Sean Brendan Lane (born 16 January 1964) is an English former professional footballer who played mostly as a striker or midfielder for Hereford United and Derby County.

Lane moved to play in the National Soccer League in Australia, playing well over 100 games for Preston Macedonia and Brunswick Juventus. He currently coaches Brisbane Strikers in the Football Queensland Premier League.

== Playing career ==
Lane's playing career that showed great promise from very early on, when Lane won selection at 15 in the England Schoolboys side before earning his first professional contract at the age of 16 with Fourth Division club Hereford United FC. After four seasons with Hereford the young midfielder earned a transfer to Second Division outfit Derby County FC, then coached by the legendary Peter Taylor. After being released by Derby County Lane's next move was to Australia, acting on an invitation from ex Hereford United colleague Ian Dobson, who was playing football in Melbourne. After several seasons with Preston, Lane was transferred to Brunswick Juventus for a then-record Australian football transfer fee of $30,000 – "that was my claim to fame for a while" – with Lane yo-yoing for several years between the two clubs in the NSL and the Victorian Premier League.

His second stint with Preston led to that first experience in coaching when Peter Ollerton fell victim to the team's poor start to the season. But despite his team losing only five of his thirteen games in charge Lane, at 31, felt he was not ready for coaching and he instead handed over to Norrie Pate before season's end.

== Coaching career ==
=== Brisbane Strikers FC ===
In 2016, Brisbane Strikers promoted Youth Men's coach Sean Lane to the club's Head Coach role for the PlayStation 4 National Premier Leagues 2017 season. The appointment marks Lane's first foray into senior head coaching in two decades. His last similar position was at Preston Lions in the Victorian Premier League in the mid-nineties. Lane guided Brisbane Strikers to National Premier league titles in 2016 and 2017. Lane also won the National Premier League Coach of the year in 2017.

=== Gold Coast United FC ===
In 2017, Gold Coast United FC scored a major coup leading into their inaugural NPLQ season in 2018, signing Sean Lane as senior men's coach. Lane took Brisbane Strikers to the league title in the just-completed NPLQ season, but has opted to join the new Gold Coast franchise. In 2018, Sean Lane resigned from the position of Head Coach of the Gold Coast United Men's squad at the end of the regular season.

=== Gold Coast Knights FC ===
Lane worked as an assistant coach with Australian outfit Gold Coast Knights FC for 2018–19 season.

=== Dhaka Mohammedan SC ===
==== 2018–19 season ====
On 6 April 2019, Lane was named as the new Head Coach of Bangladesh Premier League side Dhaka Mohammedan. Mohammedan lost Lane's first league match 4–1 to Bashundhara Kings. On 10 May 2019, Lane won his first 2018–19 Bangladesh Premier League season match 2–1 against Team BJMC. It was the club's second win in the Premier League after a hundred and ten days.

In his first Dhaka Derby in charge, Lane guided Dhaka Mohammedan to their first win in four years with a 4–0 victory over Dhaka Abahani in 2018–19 Bangladesh Premier League. This win also equal their biggest ever Dhaka Derby victory.

==== 2019–20 season ====
"We were sleeping when they pressed us in the first 15 minutes. We tried everything for the equalizer but their defence was very organized to make it difficult for us to break through."

— Lane after losing the semi against Rahmatganj MFS

On 30 December 2019, Dhaka Mohammedan reached the semifinal of the TVS 31st Federation Cup eliminating Chittagong Abahani by 2-0 goals in the second quarterfinal. The team reached the semi-finals for the first time after three editions under Sean. However, his team lost the semi-final to Rahmatganj MFS by a solitary goal from Akobir Turaev.

On 14 February 2020, Mohammedan Sporting Club Limited got off to a winning start in the 2019–20 Bangladesh Premier League, beating Arambagh KS 1-0 at Bangabandhu National Stadium. Mohammedan, under British head coach Sean Lane, prevailed thanks to Nigerian Ugochukwu Obi Moneke's strike at the half-hour mark.

On 7 March 2020, Mohammedan hogging the spotlight with a 1-0 win over defending champions Bashundhara Kings in their home debut at the Shaheed Dhirendranath Dutta Stadium in Cumilla. Nigerian forward Obi Moneke's 25th minute strike, a superb curling effort from the edge of the box, proving to be enough to split the sides. Both sides had chances to score more in front of a decent crowd which was made up mostly of travelling Bashundhara Kings supporters, but Sean Lane's charges had the last laugh. On 14 March 2020, Mohammedan Sporting Club moved to the top of the Bangladesh Premier League alongside Sheikh Jamal DC with a 4-1 thrashing of Uttar Baridhara SC.

==== 2020–21 season ====
On 17 January 2021, Mohammedan made a flying start in Bangladesh Premier League outplaying Arambagh KS by 3-0 goals. For the first time since the 2015 Bangladesh Premier League, Mohammedan remain unbeaten in both legs of Dhaka Derby. Lane's side has won 12 of the league's 24 matches, As a percentage which is the highest since the 2009–10 season.

On 29 May 2022, Lane announced he had quit Mohammedan, citing board interference.

== Statistics ==
As of 29 May 2022

Team	From	To	P	W	D	L	GS	GA	%W
(Australia) Brisbane Strikers FC	2016	2017	46	30	8	8	121	44	65.22
(Australia) Gold Coast United FC	2017	2018	26	8	3	15	38	67	30.77
(Bangladesh) Dhaka Mohammedan SC	6 April 2019	2022	75	32	23	20	112	89	42.67

== Honours ==
=== Coach ===
Brisbane Strikers FC

- National Premier Leagues Queensland: 2016, 2017

Gold Coast Knights F.C.

- National Premier Leagues Queensland: 2022 (As assistant)

=== Individual ===
- NPL coach of the year: 2017
