= Mohammedan SC (Dhaka) =

Association football club in Bangladesh

Mohammedan Sporting Club
- Full name: Mohammedan Sporting Club Limited
- Nicknames: The Black & Whites
- Short name: MSC
- Founded: 1936; 90 years ago
- Ground: Shaheed Dhirendranath Datta Stadium
- Capacity: 18,000
- President: Barkat Ullah Bulu,m.p.
- Head Coach: Fernando Santiago Varela
- League: Bangladesh Football League
- 2025–26: Bangladesh Football League, 5th of 10
Home colours	Away colours

Mohammedan Sporting Club Limited is a Bangladeshi professional football club based in Dhaka. Founded in 1936, it is one of the oldest and the most successful football club in the country, with a support base in all parts of the country. The club currently competes in the Bangladesh Football League.

== History ==
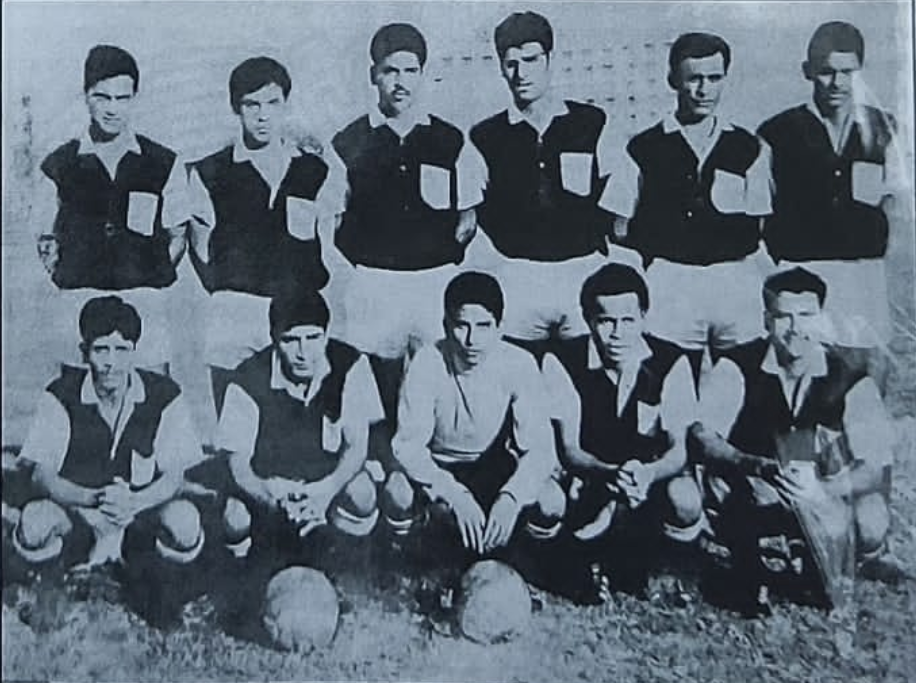
Members of the unbeaten league champions Mohammedan SC in 1969

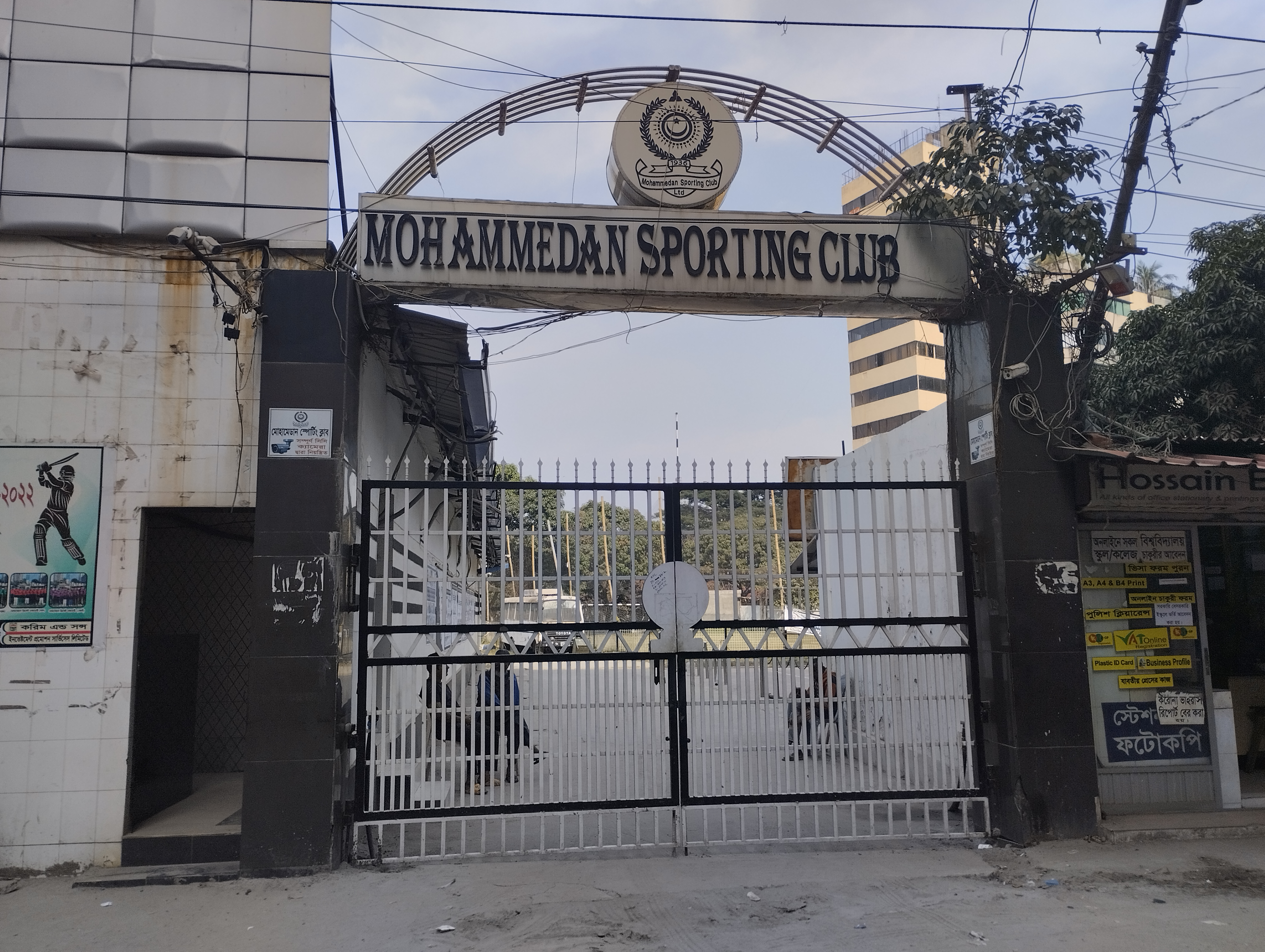
Headquarter of Mohammedan SC

The club began in Hazaribagh. Members of the famed Nawab family of Dhaka wanted to establish a local club for the youth. As a result, Muslim Sports Club came into being in 1927. Nine years later, with Khwaja Ajmal as its president, it was renamed Mohammedan Sporting Club, after its more renowned predecessor the Kolkata Mohammedan.

Though it was established to create enthusiasm for sports amongst the local Muslim community, the club later broke the race, class and ethnicity barriers and became a crowd favorite.

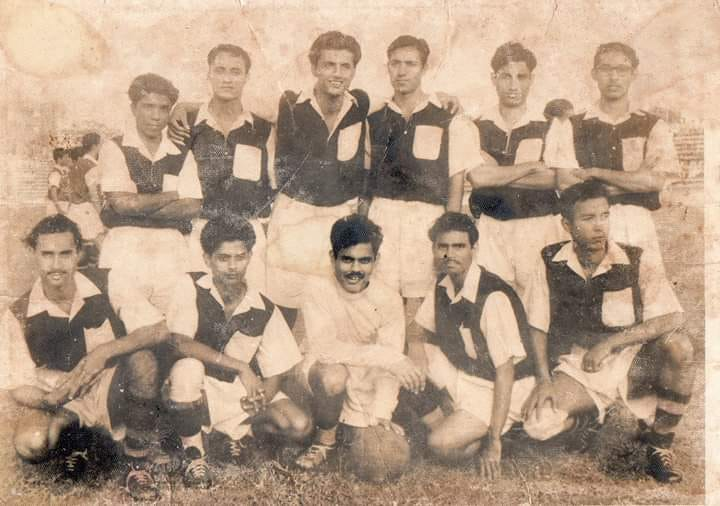
Mohammedan SC players in 1956

In the late 1940s, MSC started to flourish with Mohammad Shahjahan at the helm. Shahjahan left Kolkata Mohammedan and came to Bangladesh after the partition of India. The 1950s was a time when Dhaka Wanderers were the top dog in the sporting arena. In 1956, some of their star players and senior officials joined MSC and started restructuring the club. The results were evident as MSC secured their first league title in 1957. The same year they won the Independence Cup, thus ensuring their domestic double. The trophies kept coming over the next two decades.

Before independence, Mohammedan also clinched the First Division title in the year of 1959, '61, '63, '66 and '69. It was not easy to find success against teams like Dhaka Wanderers and Victoria SC. Yet, Mohammedan did not yield to failure, they pursued their way. Mohammedan won the Aga Khan Gold Cup for the first time in 1959. They repeated the feat twice, in 1964 and 1968.

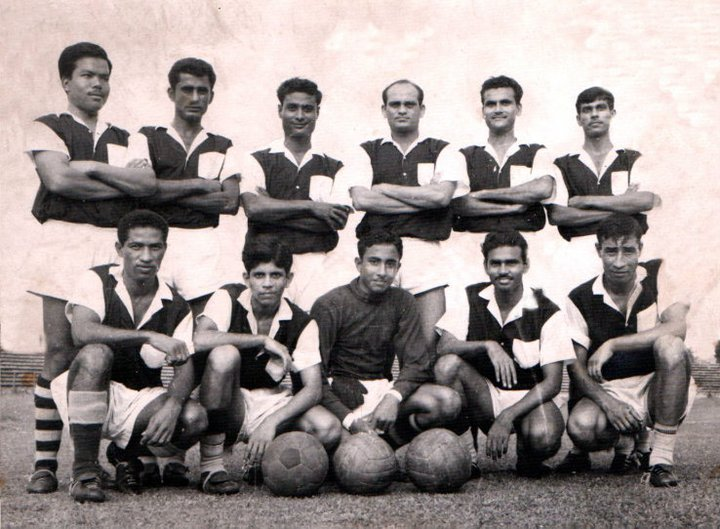
Mohammedan SC players in 1963

On 11 May 1972, Mohammedan played against Indian club Mohun Bagan under captaincy of Zakaria Pintoo, which was the first visit of a foreign team in independent Bangladesh. Dhaka Abahani adds a new dimension to domestic football in the post-independent era. And it begins a new rivalry involving Dhaka Abahani and Dhaka Mohammedan termed Dhaka Derby which took no time to spread the passion and madness throughout the country. Abahani won the league in 1974 and 1977 but the decade, however, belonged to Mohammedan as they got the better of their hardcore rival to win the league in 1975, 1976, 1978 and 1980.

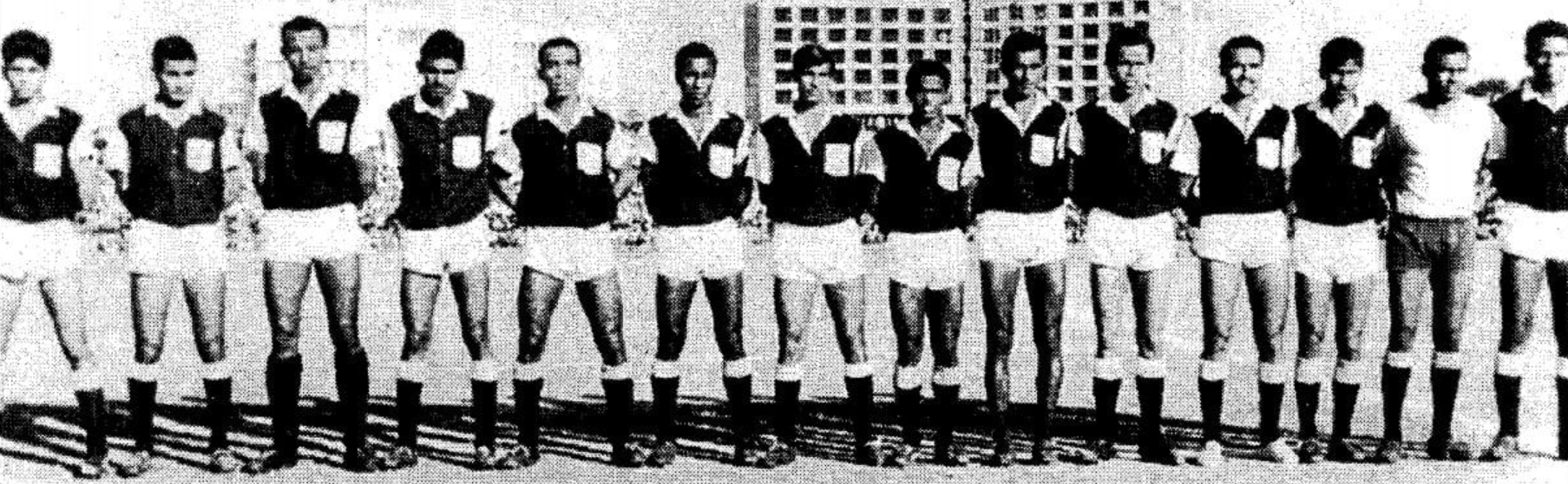
Mohammedan SC players pictured before the 1966 Aga Khan Gold Cup final.

They were unbeaten in the first division league from 8 September 1985 to 15 March 1990. They played 76 league games during those one thousand six hundred and fifty days winning 63 of them and drawing 13 times. They scored 160 and conceded 24 goals. The Black and Whites took the league title three times in a row from 1986 to 1988. They continued their success in the next decade by winning titles in 1993, 1996 & 1999. Mohammedan last won the league in 2002, yet despite the intervening years, they still hold the record for the most league titles in Bangladesh with 19 wins. In the 2024-25 season, Mohammedan finally broke their 22-year league title drought by winning the BPL, securing their first BPL title and their 20th first-tier title overall.

Mohammedan won the Federation Cup eleven times, beating Abahani seven times in the final. They won their last Federation Cup title back in 2023. Mohammedan also won the most expensive domestic football tournament of the country, Super Cup twice by taking the inaugural edition in 2009 and then the one in 2013. Their record attendance for a football game is nearly 45,000 which took place in 2009.

They had their touch on Independence Cup title three times in 1972, 1991 and 2014 with being runners up in 1990 and 2023.

Dhaka Mohammedan was the most dominating force in continental competitions among Bangladeshi clubs as well. They made it to the Asian Club Championship (the then Asian Champions League) semi-final round in 1988 thus becoming the first-ever Bangladeshi club to do so. They participated in this tournament a record six times making it to the finals thrice, a record yet to be matched by any South Asian club.

== Rivalries ==
=== Dhaka Derby ===
The Dhaka Derby is a football rivalry between Abahani and Dhaka Mohammedan, although the rivalry was bigger in the past. Dhaka Mohammedan and Dhaka Abahani first met each other during 1973 First Division League. Before Abahani's arrival, Mohammedan were the most dominant force in the country, and overthrew their previous rivals Dhaka Wanderers Club, by becoming the team with most league titles won.

=== Dhaka Wanderers ===
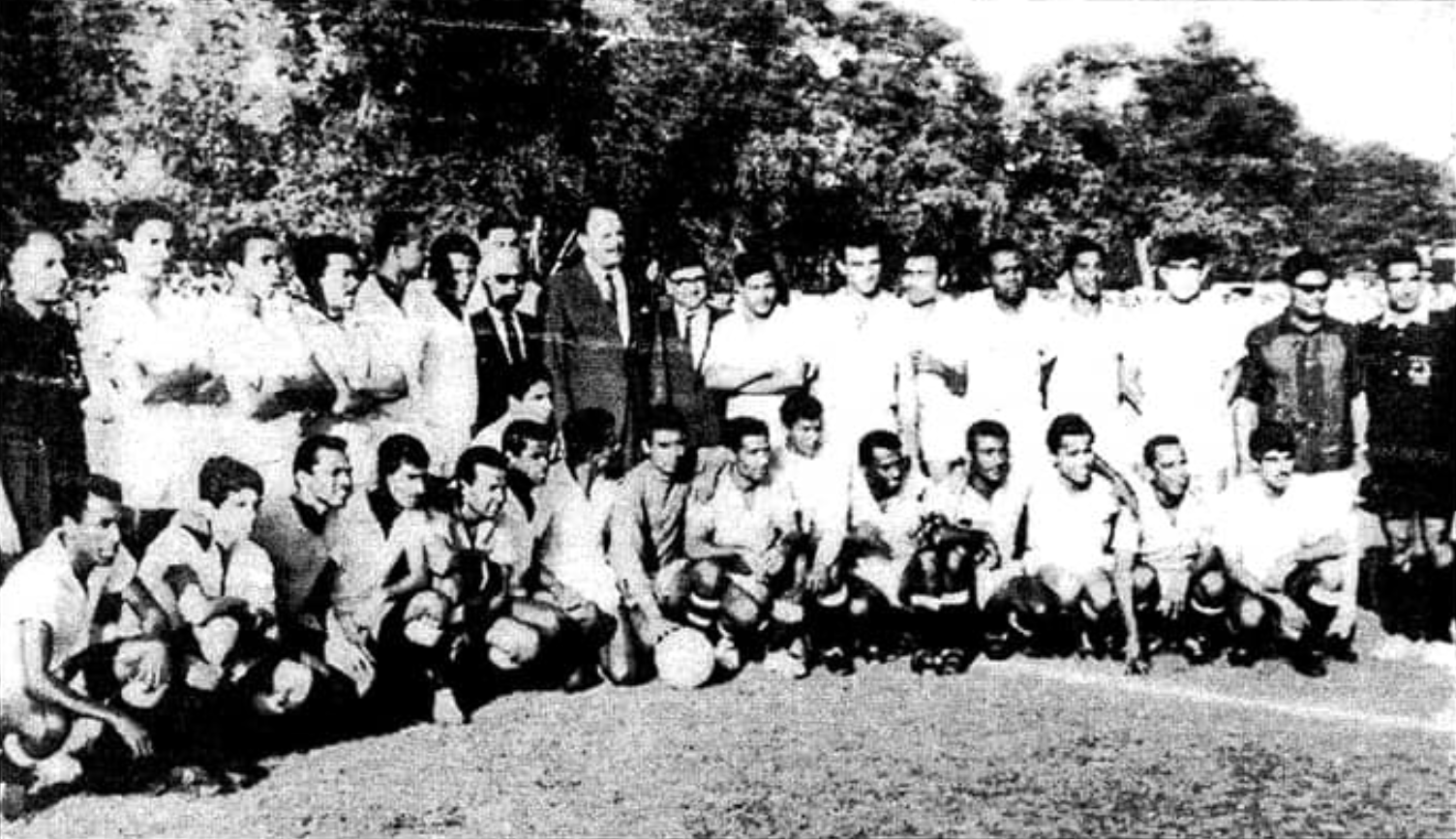
Ayub Khan, standing eighth from the left, with Dhaka Wanderers and Mohammedan players after the 1966 All-Pakistan Mohammad Ali Bogra Memorial Tournament final.

Prior independence, the club's main local rival was Dhaka Wanderers. The rivalry dates back to 1956 when Mohammedan acquired numerous players from Dhaka Wanderers, who had left due to internal conflicts within their club. Despite this, Wanderers were crowned champions that year. Both clubs were tied on points, and Mohammedan's refusal to play a playoff final resulted in the league title being awarded to Wanderers. Following their final First Division title in 1960, the rest of the decade saw Mohammedan's dominance. Notably, Wanderers lost the All-Pakistan Mohammad Ali Bogra Memorial Tournament final in 1966, contested by the two Dhaka-based teams in Rawalpindi.

== Supporters ==
=== The Black & White Warriors ===
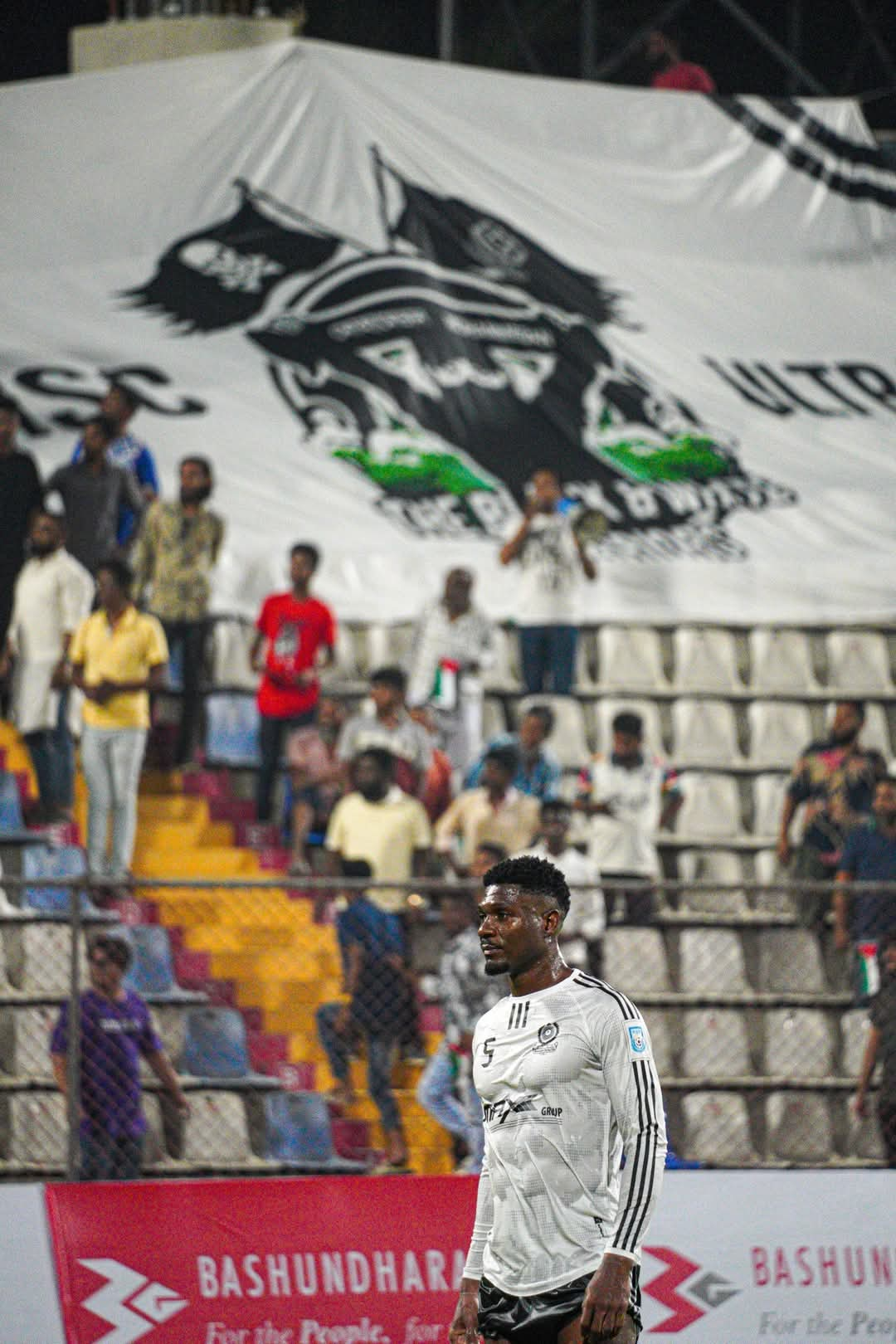
Flag of MSC Ultras is displayed by their members in an away match in Kings Arena!

The fanbase of Dhaka Mohammedan SC is organized into various supporter groups, most notably MSC Ultras also known as Mohammedan Ultras officially The Black & White Warriors , the ultras group of Dhaka Mohammedan. MSC Ultras play a key role in organizing events and creating a vibrant atmosphere during matches. This group often displays banners, leads chants, and creates coordinated displays, ensuring the team feels supported at every game.

=== Tribute to 'Ata Bhai' ===
At the final of Federation Cup 2025-26, Mohammedan Ultras gave tribute to Mohammad Ataur Rahman, popularly known as 'Ata Bhai' by showing a record breaking 50*30 feet TIFO and honoured his contribution to the club as well as to the wider football community of Bangladesh.

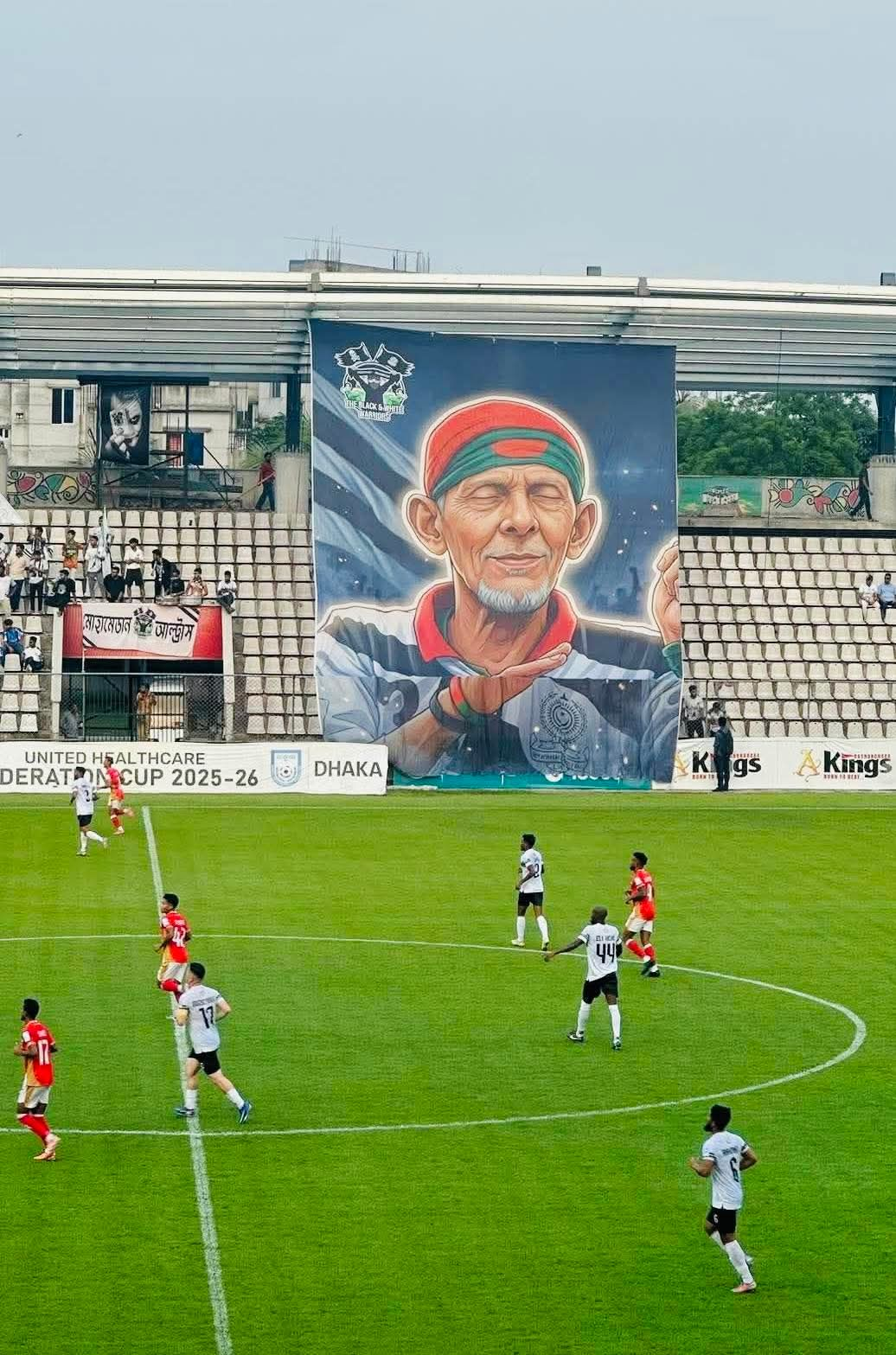
The Black & White Warriors giving tribute to legend 'Ata Bhai'

The group has also participated in social activities like Free Palestine Campaign.

== Crest and colours ==
Club crest, with Bengali alphabet

== Stadium ==
From the 2019–2020 season the club started playing their matches at the 18,000 capacity Bhasha Shoinik Shaheed Dhirendranath Datta Stadium. On 7 March 2020, Mohammedan Sporting Club hogging the spotlight with a 1–0 win over defending champions Bashundhara Kings in their home debut.

Currently the club is using Bhasha Shoinik Shaheed Dhirendranath Datta Stadium as its home venue.

== Shirt sponsors ==
Period	Kit manufacturer	Shirt sponsor
2005	None	Tibet
2008	None	Fresh Cement
2009–10	None	NTV
2011–17	None	Orion Group
2018–19	Cosco	K–Sports
2020–2021	Cosco	Orion Group
2022	Sports Apparel Design	Fresh Drinking Water
2022–2023	Sports Apparel Design	Max Group
2023–2024	Wings Sportswear	Max Group
2024–2025	Wings Sportswear	Max Group

== Current squad ==
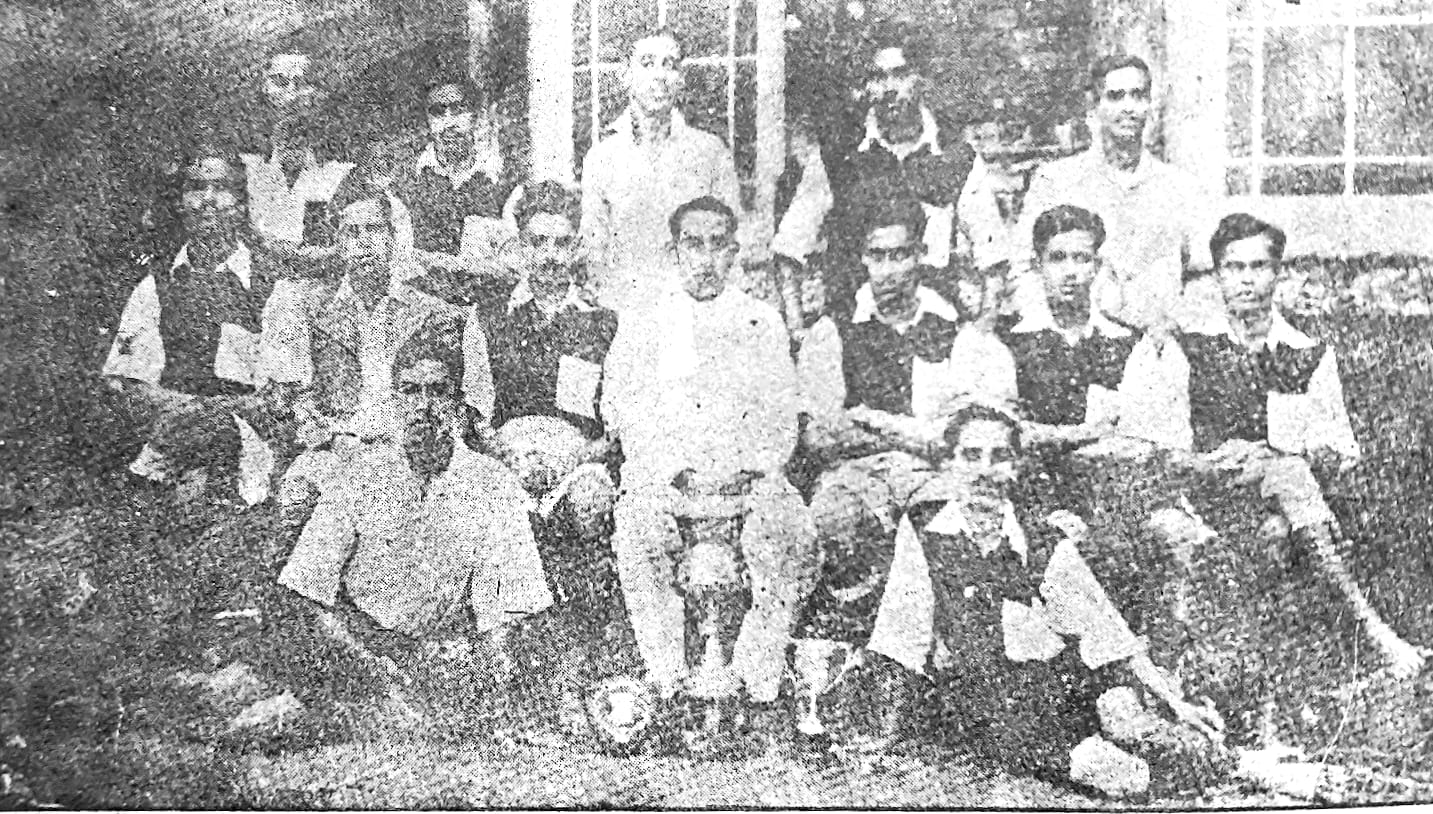
Mohammedan SC in 1938 with its first president Khwaja Ajmal

Note: Flags indicate national team as defined under FIFA eligibility rules; some limited exceptions apply. Players may hold more than one non-FIFA nationality.

No.	Pos.	Nation	Player
1	GK	BAN	Sujon Hossain
2	DF	BAN	Md. Shakil Ahad Topu
3	DF	BAN	Jahid Hasan Shanto
4	DF	BAN	Ismail Hossain
6	MF	BAN	Md Sohel Rana
7	MF	BAN	Minhajul Abedin Ballu
8	MF	BAN	Mehedi Hasan Royal
9	FW	BAN	Rahim Uddin
10	FW	MLI	Souleymane Diabate (Captain)
11	FW	BAN	Md Foysal Ahmed Fahim
12	FW	BAN	Md Joy Ahmed
13	GK	BAN	Ahsan Habib Bipu
15	DF	BAN	Shahin Ahammad
16	FW	BAN	Jewel Mia
17	MF	UZB	Muzaffar Muzaffarov
18	FW	BAN	Sourav Dewan
19	FW	BAN	Raju Ahmed Zisan

No.	Pos.	Nation	Player
20	MF	BAN	Md Mojibur Rahman Jony
21	MF	BAN	Md Safiul Hossain
22	DF	BAN	Saad Uddin
23	GK	BAN	Anisur Rahman
26	DF	BAN	Azizul Haque Anonto
28	DF	BAN	Hafizur Rahman Babu
29	FW	BAN	Amir Hakim Bappy
33	GK	BAN	Ismail Hossain Mahin
34	MF	BAN	Md Kamal Mredha
35	MF	BAN	Mahedi Hasan
37	FW	NGR	Sunday Emmanuel
55	DF	NGR	Emmanuel Tony Agbaji
71	DF	BAN	Rimon Hossain
77	FW	BAN	Arif Hossain
98	DF	BAN	Md. Rahmat Mia
99	MF	BAN	Shahriar Emon

== Personnel ==
=== Current technical staff ===
As of 29 November 2024

Role	Name
Head coach	(Bangladesh) Abdul Kayum Sentu
Team leader	(Bangladesh) Ameril Islam Babu
Goalkeeping coach	(Bangladesh) Sayeed Hassan Kanan
Team Manager	(Bangladesh) Imtiaz Ahmed Nakib
Assistant manager	(Bangladesh) Sayed Mohammad Abdul Kahhar Siddique
Physiotherapist	(Bangladesh) Md Nurul Islam
Masseur	(Bangladesh) Md Ubadullah
Masseur	(Bangladesh) Md Arman Hosen

=== Board of directors ===
As of March 2023.

Role	Name
President	(Bangladesh) Barkat Ullah Bulu,m.p.
Director in charge	(Bangladesh) Kazi Firoz Rashid
Chairman	(Bangladesh) Ghulam Mohammed Alamgir
Head of Technical Committee	(Bangladesh) Imtiaz Sultan Johnny
Technical Committee	(Bangladesh) Hasanuzzaman Khan Bablu
Technical Committee	(Bangladesh) Rumman Bin Wali Sabbir
Technical Committee	(Bangladesh) Elias Hossain
Technical Committee	(Bangladesh) Jasimuddin Ahmed Joshi
Technical Committee	(Bangladesh) Fazlur Rahman Babul

== Coaching records ==
=== Managerial history ===
- (Bangladesh) Amanuddin Chowdhury (1972–1973)
- (Bangladesh) Ashraf Chowdhury (1975–1976)
- (Bangladesh) Zakaria Pintoo (1977)
- (Bangladesh) Ashraf Chowdhury (1978–1979)
- (Bangladesh) Golam Sarwar Tipu (1980–1984)
- (Bangladesh) Enayetur Rahman (1985)
- (Bangladesh) Ali Imam (1986)
- (Bangladesh) Pratap Shankar Hazra (1987)
- (Iran) Nasser Hejazi (1987–1992)
- (Bangladesh) Mohammed Kaikobad (1992)
- (Russia) Yulkin Ivanovich (1993)
- (Bangladesh) Golam Sarwar Tipu (1994)
- (Bangladesh) Abu Yusuf (1995)
- (Nigeria) Kadiri Ikhana (1995)
- (Bangladesh) Abu Yusuf (1995, interim)
- (South Korea) Kang Man-young (1996, interim)
- (Iraq) Samir Shaker (1997–1998)
- (Bangladesh) Abul Hossain (1998, interim)
- (Bangladesh) Hasanuzzaman Bablu (1999–2000)
- (Sri Lanka) Pakir Ali (2001)
- (Bangladesh) Abul Hossain (2001–2004)
- (South Korea) Kang Man-young (2004–2005)
- (Bangladesh) Saiful Bari Titu and (Bangladesh) Mohammed Ponir (2005, interim)
- (Bangladesh) Jasimuddin Ahmed Joshi (2005)
- (Bangladesh) Shafiqul Islam Manik (2005–2008)
- (Bangladesh) Maruful Haque (2008–2010)
- (Bangladesh) Mohammed Ponir (2010, interim)
- (Bangladesh) Shafiqul Islam Manik (2010–2011)
- (Nigeria) Emeka Ezeugo (2011–2012)
- (Bangladesh) Saiful Bari Titu (2012–2013)
- (Portugal) Rui Capela (2013–2014)
- (Bangladesh) Alfaz Ahmed (2014, interim)
- (Bangladesh) Mohammed Jewel Rana (2014, interim)
- (Bangladesh) Jasimuddin Ahmed Joshi (2014–2016)
- (Bangladesh) Mizanur Rahman Dawn (2016, interim)
- (Bangladesh) Abdul Qaium Sentu (2017)
- (India) Syed Nayeemuddin (2017)
- (Bangladesh) Rashed Ahmed Pappu (2017–2018)
- (Wales) Christopher Evans (2018–2019)
- (Bangladesh) Ali Asgar Nasir (2019, interim)
- (Bangladesh) Shahidul Islam Jewel (2019, interim)
- (England) Sean Lane (2019–2022)
- (Bangladesh) Shafiqul Islam Manik (2022–2023)
- (Bangladesh) Alfaz Ahmed (2023–2026)
- (Bangladesh) Abdul Qaium Sentu (2026, interim)
- (Argentina) Fernando Santiago Varela (2026-Present)

=== Managerial statistics ===
As of 23 May 2026

Head coach	Nat.	From	To	P	W	D	L	GS	GA	%W
Maruful Haque	(Bangladesh)	July 2008	13 May 2010	61	48	11	2	150	33	78.69
Rui Capela	(Portugal)	31 December 2013	July 2014	29	13	10	6	37	24	44.83
Alfaz Ahmed^	(Bangladesh)	May 2014	May 2014	1	1	0	0	1	0	100.00
Mohammed Jewel Rana^	(Bangladesh)	May 2014	June 2014	2	2	0	0	5	3	100.00
Jasimuddin Ahmed Joshi	(Bangladesh)	24 November 2014	7 October 2016	44	17	13	14	73	52	38.64
Mizanur Rahman Dawn^	(Bangladesh)	14 October 2016	29 December 2016	13	3	5	5	12	15	23.08
Abdul Qaium Sentu	(Bangladesh)	10 January 2017	24 February 2017	3	1	1	1	2	3	33.33
Syed Nayeemuddin	(India)	9 May 2017	31 October 2017	14	6	2	6	21	17	42.86
Rashed Ahmed Pappu^	(Bangladesh)	November 2017	February 2018	13	4	5	4	14	14	30.77
Christopher Evans	(Wales)	19 September 2018	3 January 2019	6	1	3	2	5	8	16.67
Ali Asgar Nasir^	(Bangladesh)	3 January 2019	16 February 2019	5	1	0	4	4	11	20.00
Shahidul Islam Jewel^	(Bangladesh)	18 February 2019	4 March 2019	4	0	2	2	1	5	0.00
Sean Lane	(England)	4 April 2019	28 May 2022	75	32	23	20	112	89	42.67
Shafiqul Islam Manik	(Bangladesh)	5 June 2022	24 February 2023	24	10	6	8	47	29	41.67
Alfaz Ahmed	(Bangladesh)	25 February 2023	10 April 2026	80	42	23	15	163	84	52.50
Abdul Qaium Sentu^	(Bangladesh)	11 April 2026	30 May 2026	10	7	0	3	25	9	70.00
Fernando Santiago Varela	(Argentina)	10 August 2026	Present	0	0	0	0	0	0	—

^– Interim P – Total of played matches W – Won matches D – Drawn matches L – Lost matches GS – Goal scored GA – Goals against
%W – Percentage of matches won

== Season by season record ==
=== Professional league (2007–present) ===
Record as Bangladesh Premier League member
Season	Division		League							Federation Cup	Independence Cup	Asian club competition	Top league scorer(s)	
Season	Division	Position	P	W	D	L	GF	GA	Pts	Federation Cup	Independence Cup	Asian club competition	Player	Goals
2007	B.League	Runners-up	20	11	7	2	40	13	40	—	—	—	(Nigeria) Paul Nwakuchu	14
2008/09	B.League	Runners-up	20	13	5	2	42	12	44	Champions	—	—	(Nigeria) Alamu Bukola Olaken	18
2009/10	B.League	Runners-up	24	19	5	0	63	12	62	Champions	—	—	(Bangladesh) Zahid Hasan Ameli	19
2010	BPL	6th	22	8	6	8	26	26	30	Group Stage	Semi-finals	—	(Nigeria) Sunday Chizoba	12
2011/12	BPL	3rd	20	9	7	4	33	21	34	Group Stage	—	—	(Nigeria) Bazden Wilcox	7
2012/13	BPL	5th	16	7	4	5	17	17	25	Semi-finals	Semi-finals	—	(Ghana) Osei Morrison	12
2013/14	BPL	4th	27	12	9	6	36	25	45	Quarter-finals	Champions	—	(Bangladesh) Wahed Ahmed	15
2014/15	BPL	3rd	20	11	5	4	38	17	38	Semi-finals	—	—	(Guinea) Ismael Bangoura	17
2015/16	BPL	10th	22	3	11	8	20	29	20	Group Stage	Group Stage	—	(Bangladesh) Tawhidul Alam Sabuz	8
2017/18	BPL	5th	22	9	5	8	31	26	32	Quarter-finals	Group Stage	—	(Nigeria) Nkwocha Kingsley Chigozie	13
2018/19	BPL	9th	24	6	7	11	31	40	25	Group Stage	Group Stage	—	(Mali) Souleymane Diabate	8
2019/20	BPL		Abandoned							Semi-finals	—	—	(Nigeria) Ugochukwu Obi Moneke	3
2020/21	BPL	6th	24	12	7	5	36	25	43	Quarter-finals	—	—	(Mali) Souleymane Diabate	13
2021/22	BPL	5th	22	8	9	5	39	26	33	Semi-finals	Group Stage	—	(Mali) Souleymane Diabate	21
2022/23	BPL	4th	20	9	5	6	38	21	32	Champion	Quarter-finals	—	(Mali) Souleymane Diabate	16
2023/24	BPL	Runners-up	18	9	8	1	40	17	35	Runners-up	Runners-up	—	(Mali) Souleymane Diabate	17

Champions	Runners-up	Third place	Promoted	Relegated

== Honours ==
Type	Competitions	Titles	Seasons
Domestic	Bangladesh Football League	1	2024–25
Domestic	Dhaka First Division/Premier Division League	19	1957, 1959, 1961, 1963, 1965, 1966, 1969, 1975, 1976, 1978, 1980, 1982, 1986, 1987, 1988–89, 1993, 1996, 1999, 2002
Domestic	National League	2	2001–02, 2005–06
Domestic	Federation Cup	11	1980*, 1981, 1982*, 1983, 1987, 1989, 1995, 2002, 2008, 2009, 2022–23
Domestic	Independence Cup	3	1972, 1991, 2014
Domestic	Super Cup	2	2009, 2013
Domestic	Independence Day Tournament	6	1958, 1960, 1961*, 1963*, 1965, 1966*
Domestic	DMFA Cup	3	1984*, 1993, 1995

=== Invitational ===
- (Bangladesh) Ma-O-Moni Gold Cup
  - Winners (1): 1990
- All-Pakistan Mohammad Ali Bogra Memorial Tournament
  - Winners (1): 1966
  - Runners-up (1): 1967
- (India) All Airlines Gold Cup
  - Winners (1): 1999
- (India) Ashis-Jabbar Shield Tournament
  - Winners (1): 1982
- (India) Bordoloi Trophy
  - Runners-up (1): 1989
- (India) J.C. Guha Memorial Trophy
  - Runners-up (1): 1988
- (India) IFA Shield
  - Runners-up (1): 1995

=== Continental ===
- (Bangladesh) Aga Khan Gold Cup (Note: The competition is widely regarded as the predecessor of AFC Champions League (held for the first time in 1967), since it was the first organized international competition that involved club teams around Asia, organized by the football authorities of East Pakistan, in collaboration with Asian Football Confederation (AFC).)
  - Winners (3): 1959, 1964 (shared), 1968

== Performance in AFC competitions ==
Asian Club Championship/AFC Champions League: 6 appearances

- 1987 : Qualifying Round
- 1988–89 : Semi Final League
- 1989–90 : Qualifying Round
- 1990–91 : Quarter Final League
- 1991 : Group Stage
- 1997–98 : First Round

Asian Cup Winners' Cup: 4 appearances

- 1990–91 : Second Round
- 1992–93 : Intermediate Round
- 1993–94 : Second Round
- 1996–97 : Second Round

AFC Cup: 1 appearance

- 2006 : Group Stage

== Notable players ==
- The players below had senior international cap(s) for their respective countries. Players listed represented their countries before or after playing for Mohammedan Sporting Club (Dhaka).

Asia

- (Pakistan) Sheikh Shaheb Ali (1938)
- (Pakistan) Ashraf Chowdhury (1950; 1956–63)
- (Pakistan) Amir Jang Ghaznavi (1956–63)
- (Pakistan) Fazlur Rahman Arzu (1956–1958)
- (Pakistan) Kabir Ahmed (1956–58; 1960–66)
- (Pakistan) Mari Chowdhury (1957–58; 1961–62)
- (Pakistan) Nabi Chowdhury (1958)
- (Pakistan) Debinash Sangma (1958–59; 1961–65; 1968–69)
- (Pakistan) Abid Hussain Ghazi (1959–66)
- (Pakistan) Muhammad Irshad (1960)
- (Pakistan) Zahirul Haque (1960–76)
- (Pakistan) Abdullah Rahi (1960–61; 1964–70)
- (Pakistan) Turab Ali (1965–68)
- (Pakistan) Ghulam Abbas Baloch (1961)
- (Pakistan) Abdul Ghafoor (1961; 1965–68; 1977)
- (Pakistan) Moosa Ghazi (1962–68)
- (Pakistan) (India) Balai Dey (1962; 1963–64)
- (Pakistan) Qayyum Changezi (1963)
- (Pakistan) Muhammad Amin (1964)
- (Pakistan) Khandoker Mohammad Nurunnabi (1965–70)
- (Pakistan) Qadir Bakhsh (1967)
- (Pakistan) Hafizuddin Ahmed (1967–78)
- (Pakistan) Abdul Jabbar (1967–68)
- (Pakistan) Maula Bakhsh (1968)
- (Pakistan) Golam Sarwar Tipu (1968–72; 1975–79)
- (Pakistan) Ali Nawaz Baloch (1969)
- (Pakistan) Ayub Dar (1970)
- (India) Mohammed Rahmatullah (1963–64)
- (Pakistan) Ashiq Ali (1977)
- (Pakistan) Afzal Hussain (1977)
- (Pakistan) Fazlur Rehman (1977)
- (Pakistan) Amir Bakhsh (1979)
- (Bhutan) Khare Basnet (1980)
- (Nepal) Ganesh Thapa (1981–82; 1985–86)
- (Iran) Nasser Hejazi (1987)
- (Iran) Morteza Yekkeh (1987)
- (Iran) Bijan Taheri (1988–89)
- (Iran) Reza Naalchegar (1987–89)
- (Thailand) Ronnachai Sayomchai (1988)
- (Uzbekistan) Azamat Abduraimov (1991–92)
- (Bhutan) Wangay Dorji (2000)

Africa

- (Nigeria) Emeka Ezeugo (1987–89)
- (Mali) Ousmane Berthé (2019–20)
- (Central African Republic) Yassan Ouatching (2021)
- (Nigeria) Sunday Emmanuel (2023–2025)

== See also ==
- Mohammedan Sporting Club cricket team
- Kolkata Mohammedan
- Chittagong Mohammedan
