= Nabi Chowdhury =

Bangladeshi footballer and manager

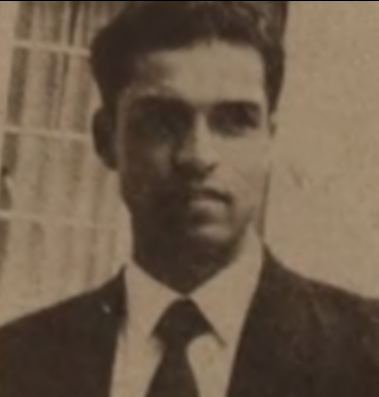
- Nabi Chowdhury in 1958

Personal information
- Full name: Nurunnabi Chowdhury
- Date of birth: 1934
- Place of birth: Feni, Noakhali District, Bengal Presidency, British India (present-day Bangladesh)
- Date of death: January 2003 (aged 68–69)
- Place of death: Dhaka, Bangladesh
- Positions: Center-half; right half

Senior career*
Years	Team	Apps	(Gls)
1952–1956	Pakistan Air Force		
1956–1957	Dhaka Wanderers		
1958	PWD		
1959–1968	Police		

International career
1959–1961	East Pakistan		
1954–1958	Pakistan		
- * Club domestic league appearances and goals

Nurunnabi Chowdhury (Bengali: নুরুন্নবী চৌধুরী; 1934 – January 2003), better known as Nabi Chowdhury, was a former Bangladeshi football player and the first East Pakistani or Bengali to captain the Pakistan national football team.

== Early life ==
Nabi Chowdhury was born in Aziz Fazilpur village in the Feni sub-division of Noakhali District, Bengal. Nabi began his career in inter-school football after being inspired by headmaster Jalaluddin Ahmed. He represented Comilla Victoria College while simultaneously playing in the Comilla Football League with Pak United. He joined the Pakistan Air Force following his intermediate examinations.

== Club career ==
=== Pakistan Air Force ===
Nabi represented Royal Pakistan Air Force in the Inter-Service Championship from 1952 to 1956. He came into the limelight in 1953, scoring a hat-trick for Pakistan Combined Services football team against a touring Austrian team in Karachi. In 1955, he toured Tehran, Iran, with the Pakistan Combined Services team as an Air Force member and participated in a football tournament which reportedly included teams from Turkey, India, Iraq and Syria. In the same year, he represented Air Force in the National Football Championship in Bahawalpur. During the first-round, Nabi scored in 5–0 victory against Sindh on 16 November. The team eventually exited the tournament from the quarter-finals, losing 4–2 to eventual champions, Punjab on 20 November. In 1956, he again toured Iran with the Armed Forces team, which played three exhibition matches in Tehran against the Iranian Army–Air Force XI, a civil team, and the Navy–Civil XI.

=== Dhaka Football League ===
Nabi left the Air Force in 1957 after moving back to East Pakistan. He began playing for Dhaka Wanderers Club from 1956 and represented the team until 1957. In his first year, Wanderers, coming off a hat-trick of Dhaka First Division League titles, lost many of their senior players to Mohammedan SC following a fallout with club officials. Nevertheless, Nabi led a young Wanderers side to his first league championship and the club's fourth consecutive title. In 1957, he assisted the club in its joint triumph at the Independence Day Football Tournament alongside Police AC. However, that season saw Wanderers finally lose the league title to Mohammedan.

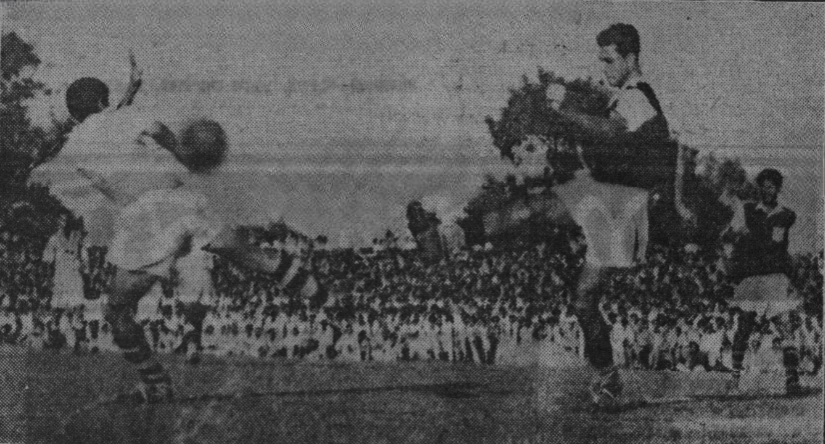
Nabi's (R) attempt at clearing the ball blocked by Yamani (L) during the 1958 IFA Shield quarter-final between Dhaka and Kolkata Mohammedan.

In 1958, he joined newly promoted First Division side PWD SC. He also captained the club during the inaugural Aga Khan Gold Cup in Dhaka. In the same year, he won the Independence Day Football Tournament as a guest player for Mohammedan, with the club defeating Dhaka University 2–1 in the final. He also represented Mohammedan in the IFA Shield in Calcutta, India, playing as a centre-half. Mohammedan defeated Calcutta Police, Aryan FC, and Punjab XI before exiting in the quarter-finals following a 3–0 defeat to the defending champions, Kolkata Mohammedan.

Nabi also helped Noakhali District win the 1958 Inter-District Football Tournament. In the final held at Dhaka Stadium, Noakhali tied 2–2 with Dhaka District, with their goals coming from Nabi and Bimal. They were eventually awarded the trophy after a coin toss. This was the first time a trophy was awarded to a sole team based on the toss in the region.

He eventually joined the East Pakistan Police as a Sergeant and represented Police AC as captain from 1959 until his retirement in 1968. In his debut season at the club in 1959, he helped Police jointly win the Independence Day Football Tournament alongside Azad SC after both teams finished level in the final. Towards the end of his career, Nabi began playing in a more attacking role. On 23 July 1967, he scored three goals against Central Stationary in the First Division in only his second appearance of the season. In the same year, he captained Dhaka Police in the Zakir Hossain Shield, leading the team to a 6–1 victory over Bakerganj Police XI in the final on 24 September, during which he scored a brace.

=== East Pakistan ===
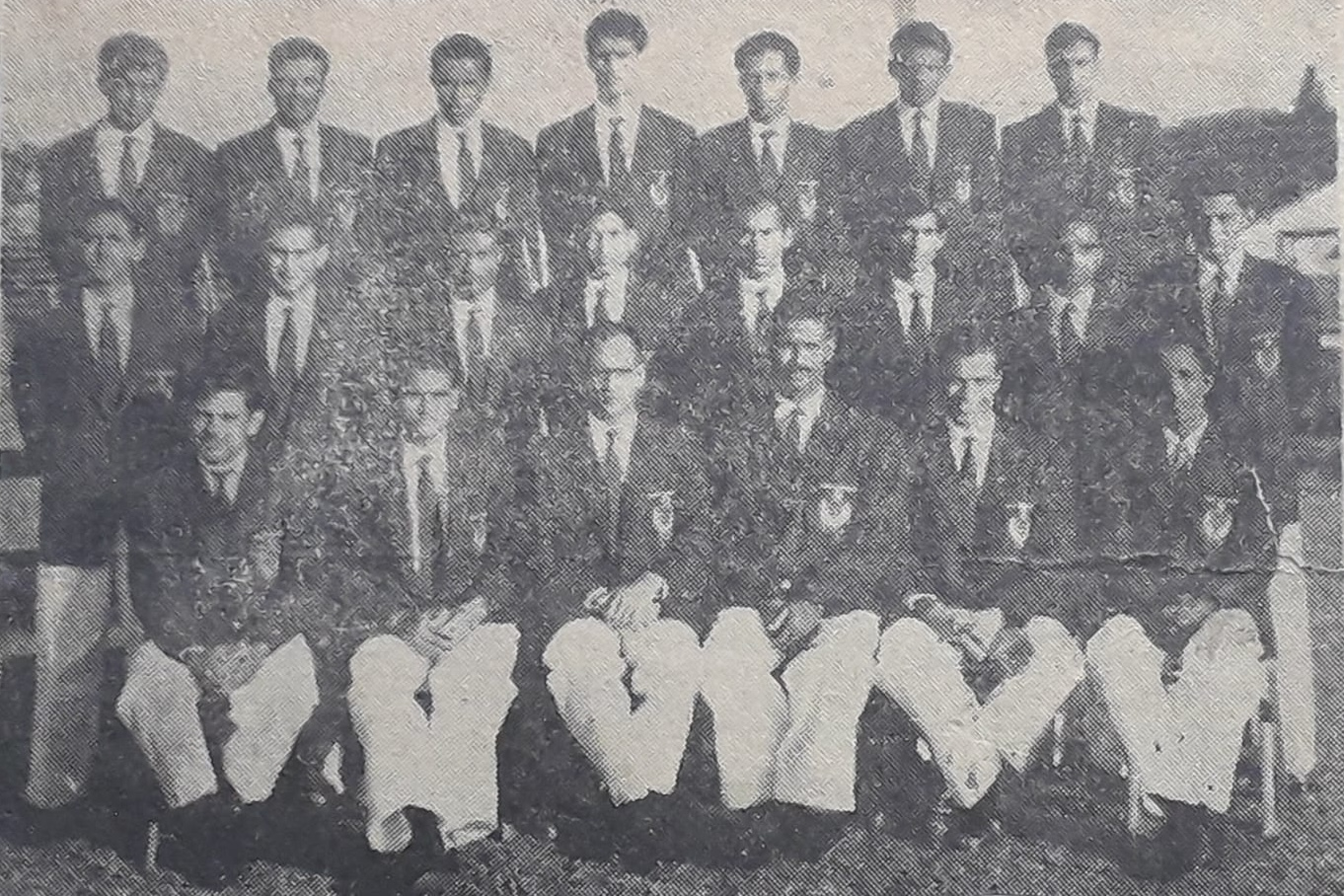
Nabi (sitting second from left) with the 1960 National Champions, East Pakistan.

In 1957, Nabi participated in the National Football Championship held in Dhaka as a member of the eventual runners-up, East Pakistan Whites. He played as a center-half, alongside fullbacks Amir Jang Ghaznavi and Eugene Gomes. He scored in the first round against Pakistan Navy FC in a 5–2 victory on 22 October, during which Ashraf Chowdhury scored a hat-trick. In the final against Punjab, held in Dhaka Stadium on 10 November, Nabi was forced to leave the field for five minutes after sustaining a nose injury, during which time his team conceded a goal and would eventually go on to lose the game 1–2.

In the 1958 edition of the National Championship held in Multan, Nabi captained East Pakistan, as his team exited the tournament in the quarter-final, falling 1–3 to Punjab Reds, the junior string of the team they had faced in the previous year's final. On 16 October 1959, Nabi represented East Pakistan during an exhibition match in Gujranwala against the local Al Hilal Club, scoring the winner in a 2–1 victory from a direct corner after Shah Alam scored the first for East Pakistan.

Following the exhibition matches, Nabi represented East Pakistan in the 1959 National Championship held in Hyderabad, where his team again finished runners-up, losing to 0–1 to Baluchistan in the final held on 7 November 1959. Eventually, in the following edition held in Karachi, he was part of the East Pakistan team that won its maiden National Championship, defeating Karachi White 1–0 in the final held on 27 November 1960.

Following 1960, when the EP Sports Federation began sending divisional teams to the National Championship, Nabi started representing the Chittagong Division.

== International career ==
=== East Pakistan ===
On 14 May 1959, Nabi represented the East Pakistan football team (East Pakistan Sports Federation XI) in an exhibition match against the Pakistan national team in Dhaka. The game held at Dhaka Stadium finished in a 2–1 defeat for the East Wing. In January 1961, he represented East Pakistan in two exhibition matches against the touring Burma national team in Dhaka and Chittagong. The games held on 17 and 26 January ended in 3–0 and 9–1 defeats, respectively.

=== Pakistan ===
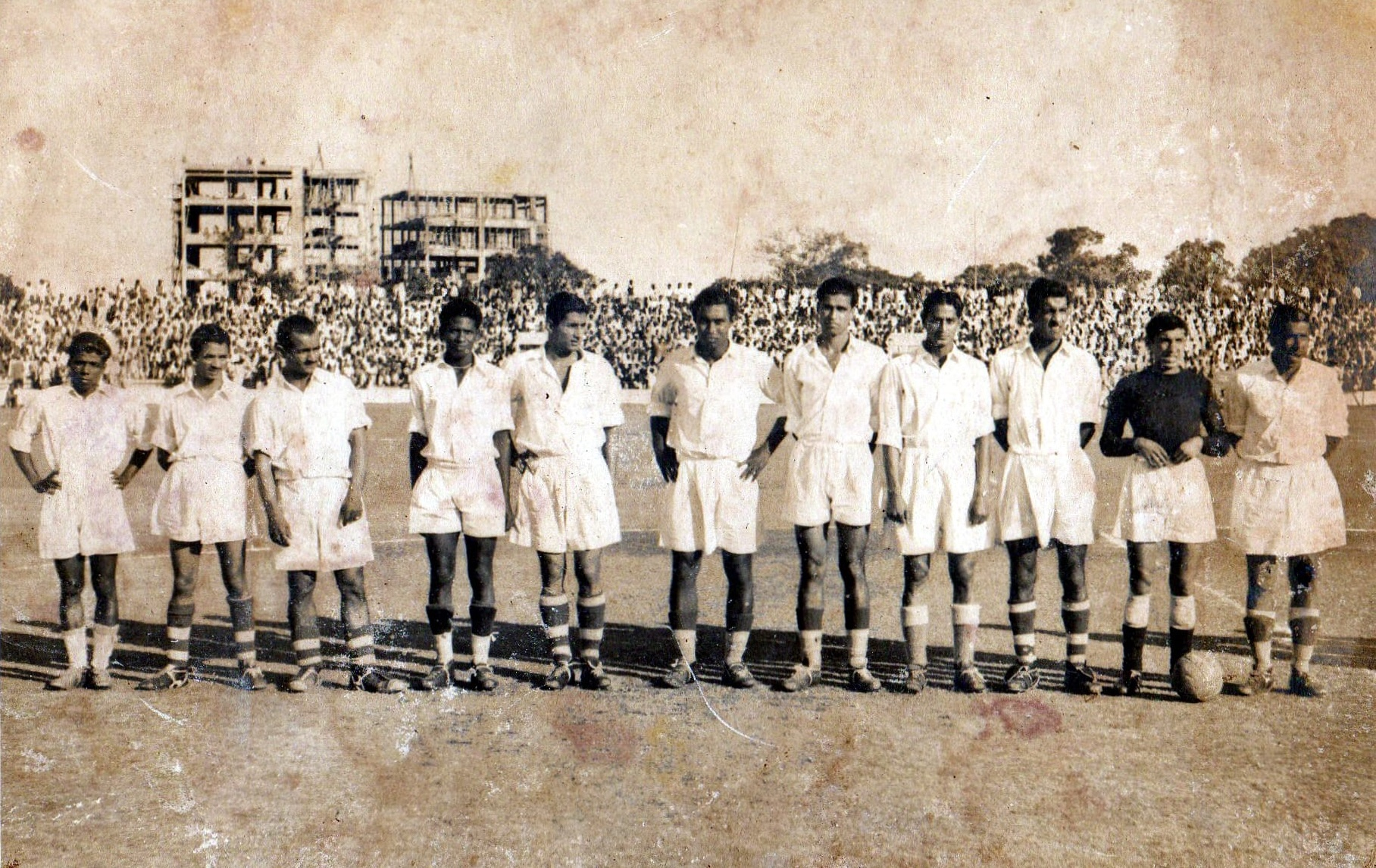
Nabi (standing fifth from right) with the Pakistan team in 1955 at Dhaka Stadium prior to an exhibition match against India.

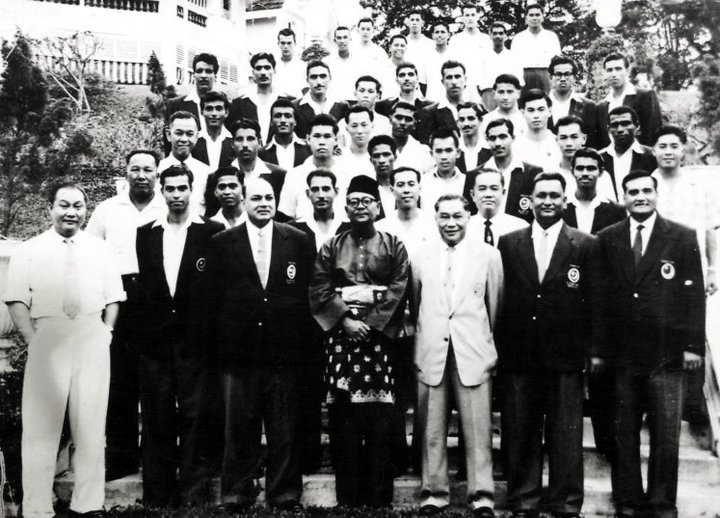
Nabi (second from left in the front row) with the Pakistan and Malaya national teams for the 1958 Asian Games pictured with Tunku Abdul Rahman prior to the tournament

Nabi made his debut for the Pakistan national team in a friendly against Singapore in Kallang, which ended in a 2–2 draw. He subsequently represented the team at the 1954 Manila Asian Games.

He later participated in both the 1954 Asian Quadrangular Football Tournament and 1955 Asian Quadrangular Football Tournament, with the latter held on home soil, in Dacca, East Pakistan (now Bangladesh).

In 1956, he toured Singapore, China and Ceylon with the national team. Nabi captained Pakistan at the 1958 Tokyo Asian Games, the first Bengali to do so. The team, including six Bengali players, tied the first game 1–1 with South Vietnam and lost its final game 1–3 to the Republic of China. Prior to the tournament, he captained the team during exhibition matches against the likes of Malaya and Singapore.

== Organizing career ==
Following the Independence of Bangladesh, Nabi served as a Deputy Police Commissioner of Dhaka Metropolitan Police. Nabi served as the chairman of the Bangladesh Football Federation (BFF) national team selection committee from 1973 to 1974 and as the general secretary in 1979. He was a member for four terms, specifically in 1975, 1977, 1982, and 1992–1993. Nabi played an integral role in selecting the first Bangladesh national team alongside Sheikh Shaheb Ali, Manzur Hasan Mintu, and Ranjit Das for the 1973 Merdeka Tournament. He served as the team manager of the Bangladesh U20 team under Werner Bickelhaupt at the 1978 AFC Youth Championship in Dhaka.

== Death ==
Nabi died of diabetes-related complications in January 2003.

== Honours ==
Dhaka Wanderers

- Dhaka First Division League: 1956
- Independence Day Tournament: 1957

Mohammedan

- Independence Day Tournament: 1958

Police

- Independence Day Tournament: 1959

East Pakistan

- National Championship: 1960; runner-up: 1957, 1959

Pakistan

- Asian Quadrangular Football Tournament runner-up: 1955

Individual

- National Sports Award of Bangladesh: 1978

== See also ==
- List of Pakistan national football team captains

== Bibliography ==
- Mahmud, Dulal (2014). পাকিস্তান জাতীয় দল বাঙালি খেলোয়াড় (transl. Bengali players in the Pakistan national team) (in Bengali). Bishhoshahitto Bhobon.
- Mahmud, Dulal (2020). খেলার মাঠে মুক্তিযুদ্ধ (transl. Liberation war in the playground) (in Bengali). Bishhoshahitto Bhobon. ISBN 978-984-8218-31-0.
- Alam, Masud (2017). ফুটবলের গল্প ফুটবলারদের গল্প (transl. The story of football the story of footballers) (in Bengali). Bishhoshahitto Bhobon. ISBN 9789849134688.
