= Pakistan national football team records and statistics =

Records of Pakistan national football team

The following is a list of the Pakistan national football team's competitive records and statistics.

The Pakistan national football team represents Pakistan in men's international football in FIFA-authorised events and is controlled by the Pakistan Football Federation, the governing body for football in Pakistan. Pakistan became a member of FIFA in 1948 and joined the Asian Football Confederation in 1950.

Pakistan's national team debuted in 1950 and has yet to qualify for the FIFA World Cup finals. Pakistan has never qualified for any major tournament outside the South Asian region, although on regional level the team has won the 1952 Asian Quadrangular Football Tournament, and has achieved gold at the South Asian Games in 1989 and 1991. Pakistan had a brief period of emergence in the 1950s and early 1960s, but as the global popularity of football surged, the sport's standing in Pakistan deteriorated. The standard achieved in the early years could not be maintained because of lack of organization of the game and the administration's lack of attention to football. Football has also struggled to gain popularity in Pakistan largely due to the heavy influence of cricket in South Asia.

== Individual records ==
=== Player records ===
As of 2 October 2026
Players in bold are still active with Pakistan.

=== Most appearances ===
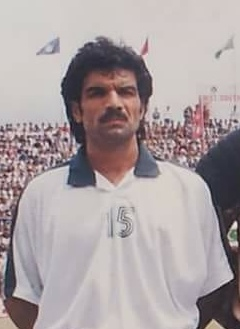
Haroon Yousaf is Pakistan's most capped player with 49 appearances.

Rank	Player	Caps	Goals	Period
1	Haroon Yousaf	49	3	1992–2003
2	Jaffar Khan	47	0	2001–2013
3	Zafar Iqbal	45	1	1985–1995
4	Samar Ishaq	44	3	2006–2013
5	Muhammad Essa	40	11	2001–2009
5	Muhammad Tariq Hussain	40	0	1987–2003
7	**Yousuf Butt**	36	0	2012–present
8	Muhammad Umer	35	18	1956–1965
8	Abdul Ghafoor	35	3	1959–1974
8	Abdullah Rahi	35	3	1959–1967

NB Exact figures of old long-serving players such as Muhammad Umer, Abdul Ghafoor, Abdullah Rahi & Abid Hussain Ghazi, who are likely to have accumulated between 30 and 40 caps, are not yet known and yet to be researched. Additionally, player appearances are also missing in the 2000 AFC Asian Cup qualification, two of the 2002 friendly matches against Sri Lanka, 2005 Islamic Solidarity Games match against Malaysia, and 2006 friendly against Palestine in the primary source and yet to be updated.

=== Top goalscorers ===
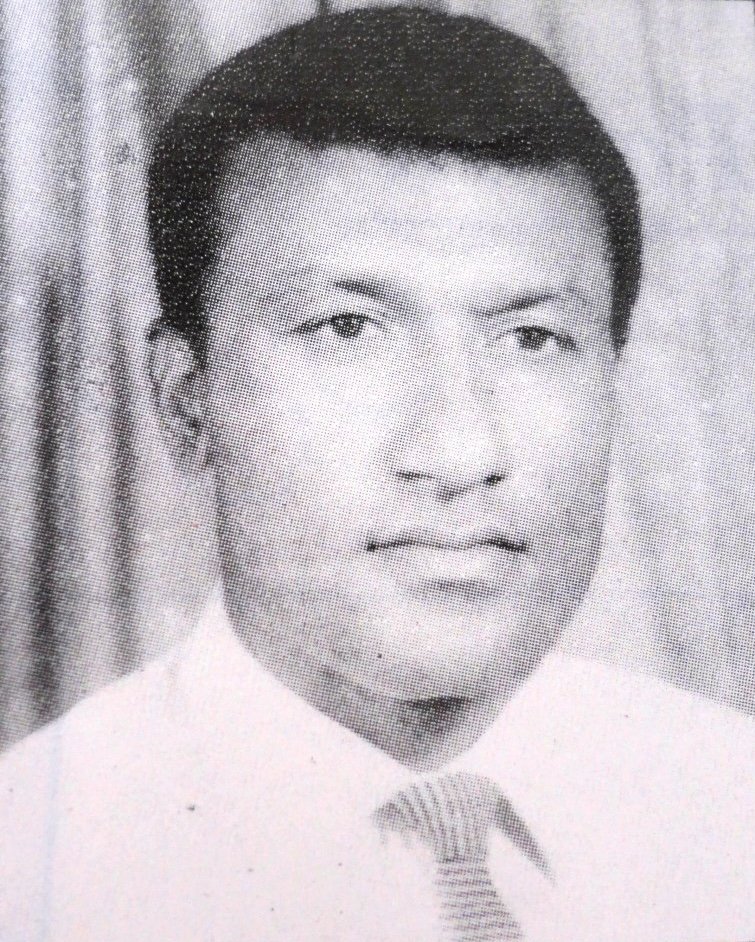
Muhammad Umer is Pakistan's all-time top scorer with 18 goals.

Rank	Player	Goals	Caps	Ratio	Period
1	Muhammad Umer	18	35	0.51	1956–1965
2	Sharafat Ali	12	32	0.38	1984–1992
3	Moosa Ghazi	11	25	0.44	1955–1967
3	Muhammad Essa	11	40	0.28	2001–2009
5	Masood Fakhri	10	13	0.77	1952–1955
6	Qayyum Changezi	9	—	—	1955–1963
6	Hassan Bashir	9	29	0.31	2012–2023
8	Jamil Akhtar	8	14	0.57	1952–1955
9	Arif Mehmood	7	21	0.33	2005–2012
10	Ghulam Sarwar Teddy	6	—	—	1984–1992
10	Muhammad Nauman Khan	6	18	0.33	1991–1997
10	Sarfraz Rasool	6	23	0.26	1997–2003

NB Goalscorer information is currently missing and yet to be researched for the 1–1 draw against India at the 1976 Afghanistan Republic Day Festival Cup, the 4–7 friendly defeat against China in 1973, and the 1–1 draw against South Vietnam at the 1958 Asian Games.

=== Captains ===
- In major Continental and International tournaments. For the complete list, see the main article.

Player	Tournament(s)
Moideen Kutty	1954 Asian Games
Nabi Chowdhury	1958 Asian Games
Abdul Ghafoor	1974 Asian Games
Muhammad Naveed	1986 Asian Games
Mateen Akhtar	1990 Asian Games
Jaffar Khan	2006 AFC Challenge Cup

== Competition records ==
=== FIFA World Cup ===
FIFA World Cup record									Qualification record					
Year	Result	Position	Pld	W	D*	L	GF	GA	Pld	W	D*	L	GF	GA
1930 to 1938	Part of United Kingdom								Part of United Kingdom					
1950 to 1986	Did not enter								Did not enter					
(Italy) 1990	Did not qualify								4	0	0	4	1	12
(United States) 1994	Did not qualify								8	0	0	8	2	36
(France) 1998	Did not qualify								4	0	0	4	3	22
(South Korea) (Japan) 2002	Did not qualify								6	0	1	5	5	29
(Germany) 2006	Did not qualify								2	0	0	2	0	6
(South Africa) 2010	Did not qualify								2	0	1	1	0	7
(Brazil) 2014	Did not qualify								2	0	1	1	0	3
(Russia) 2018	Did not qualify								2	0	1	1	1	3
(Qatar) 2022	Did not qualify								2	0	0	2	1	4
(Canada) (Mexico) (United States) 2026	Did not qualify								8	1	1	6	2	26
(Morocco) (Portugal) (Spain) 2030	To be determined								To be determined					
(Saudi Arabia) 2034	To be determined								To be determined					
Total		0/20	—	—	—	—	—	—	40	1	5	34	15	148

=== AFC Asian Cup ===
AFC Asian Cup record									Qualification record					
Year	Result	Position	Pld	W	D*	L	GF	GA	Pld	W	D*	L	GF	GA
(Hong Kong) 1956	Withdrew								Withdrew					
(South Korea) 1960	Did not qualify								6	2	1	3	8	10
(Israel) 1964	Withdrew								Withdrew					
(Iran) 1968	Did not qualify								3	0	1	2	1	4
(Thailand) 1972	Withdrew								Withdrew					
(Iran) 1976	Withdrew								Withdrew					
(Kuwait) 1980	Withdrew								Withdrew					
(Singapore) 1984	Did not qualify								4	1	0	3	4	14
(Qatar) 1988	Did not qualify								4	0	0	4	1	12
(Japan) 1992	Did not qualify								2	0	0	2	0	9
(United Arab Emirates) 1996	Did not qualify								2	0	0	2	0	7
(Lebanon) 2000	Did not qualify								4	0	0	4	0	16
(China) 2004	Did not qualify								2	1	0	1	3	3
(Indonesia) (Malaysia) (Thailand) (Vietnam) 2007	Did not qualify								8	0	1	7	4	23
(Qatar) 2011	Did not enter								Did not enter					
(Australia) 2015	Did not enter								Did not enter					
(United Arab Emirates) 2019	Did not qualify								2	0	1	1	1	3
(Qatar) 2023	Did not qualify								2	0	0	2	1	4
(Saudi Arabia) 2027	Did not qualify								12	1	3	8	3	30
Total		0/19	—	—	—	—	—	—	51	5	7	39	26	135

=== AFC Challenge Cup ===
The AFC Challenge Cup was held every two years from 2006 through 2014.

AFC Challenge Cup record									Qualification record					
Year	Result	Position	Pld	W	D	L	GF	GA	Pld	W	D*	L	GF	GA
(Bangladesh) 2006	Group stage	10th	3	1	1	1	3	4	No qualification					
(India) 2008	Did not qualify								3	2	0	1	12	10
(Sri Lanka) 2010	Did not qualify								3	1	2	0	9	3
(Nepal) 2012	Did not qualify								3	1	0	2	3	6
(Maldives) 2014	Did not qualify								3	1	0	2	2	2
Total	Group stage	1/5	3	1	1	1	3	4	12	5	2	5	26	21

=== Asian Games ===
Football at the Asian Games has been an under-23 tournament since 2002.

Asian Games record
Year	Position	Pld	W	D	L	GF	GA
(India) 1951	Did not enter						
(Philippines) 1954	Round 1	2	1	0	1	7	4
(Japan) 1958	Round 1	2	0	1	1	2	4
(Indonesia) 1962	Did not enter						
(Thailand) 1966	Did not enter						
(Thailand) 1970	Did not enter						
(Iran) 1974	Round 1	3	1	0	2	6	13
(Thailand) 1978	Did not enter						
(India) 1982	Did not enter						
(South Korea) 1986	Round 1	4	0	0	4	2	15
(China) 1990	Round 1	3	0	0	3	1	16
(Japan) 1994	Did not enter						
(Thailand) 1998	Did not enter						
2002 to present	See Pakistan national under-23 football team						
Total	5/13	14	2	1	11	18	52

=== South Asian Games ===
Football at the South Asian Games has been an under-23 tournament since 2004.

South Asian Games record
Year	Position	Pld	W	D*	L	GF	GA
(Nepal) 1984	Did not enter						
(Bangladesh) 1985	Fourth place	3	1	1	1	6	5
(India) 1987	Third place	3	2	1	0	2	0
(Pakistan) 1989	Champions	3	2	1	0	5	2
(Sri Lanka) 1991	Champions	3	2	1	0	3	0
(Bangladesh) 1993	Group stage	2	0	1	1	3	4
(India) 1995	Withdrew						
(Nepal) 1999	Group stage	3	1	0	2	5	9
2004 to present	See Pakistan national under-23 football team						
Total	6/8	17	8	5	4	24	20

=== SAFF Championship ===
SAFF Championship record
Year	Result	Position	Pld	W	D*	L	GF	GA
(Pakistan) 1993	Fourth place	4th	3	0	2	1	2	6
(Sri Lanka) 1995	Group stage	5th	2	1	0	1	1	2
(Nepal) 1997	Third place	3rd	4	2	0	2	3	4
(India) 1999	Group stage	6th	2	0	0	2	0	6
(Bangladesh) 2003	Fourth place	4th	5	3	0	2	5	4
(Pakistan) 2005	Semi-finals	4th	4	2	1	1	2	1
(Sri Lanka) (Maldives) 2008	Group stage	8th	3	0	0	3	2	9
(Bangladesh) 2009	Group stage	5th	3	1	1	1	7	1
(India) 2011	Group stage	5th	3	0	3	0	1	1
(Nepal) 2013	Group stage	5th	3	1	1	1	3	3
(India) 2015	Withdrew							
(Bangladesh) 2018	Semi-finals	4th	4	2	0	2	6	5
(Maldives) 2021	Suspended							
(India) 2023	Group stage	8th	3	0	0	3	0	9
Total	Third place	12/14	39	12	8	19	32	51

=== RCD Cup ===
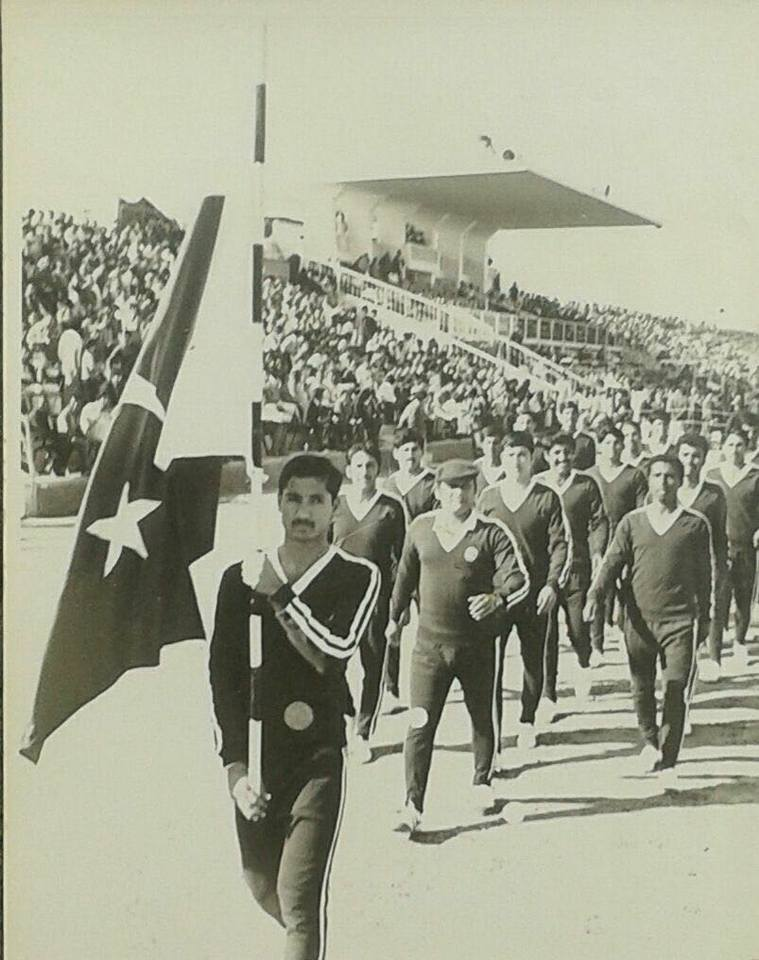
Pakistan at the 1974 RCD Cup

RCD Cup record
Year	Position	Pld	W	D*	L	GF	GA
(Iran) 1965	Third place	2	0	0	2	2	7
(Pakistan) 1967	Third place	2	0	0	2	4	9
(Turkey) 1969	Third place	2	0	0	2	4	8
(Iran) 1970	Third place	2	0	0	2	1	10
(Pakistan) 1974	Third place	2	0	1	1	3	4
Total	5/6	10	0	1	9	14	38

=== Other tournaments ===
==== Asian Quadrangular Tournament ====
Year	Position	Pld	W	D*	L	GF	GA
(Sri Lanka) 1952	Joint champions	3	2	0	1	3	1
(Myanmar) 1953	Runners-up	3	1	1	1	7	2
(India) 1954	Runners-up	3	1	1	1	4	5
(Pakistan) 1955	Runners-up	3	1	1	1	4	4
Total	1 Title	12	5	3	4	18	12

==== Diamond Jubilee International Football Tournament ====
The Diamond Jubilee International Football Tournament is an invitational four-nation friendly tournament organized by the Football Association of Maldives to celebrate the 75th anniversary of Maldivian football.

Year	Result	Position	Pld	W	D*	L	GF	GA
(Maldives) 2026	Champions	1st	4	3	1	0	7	0
Total	—	1/1	4	3	1	0	7	0

== Head-to-head record ==
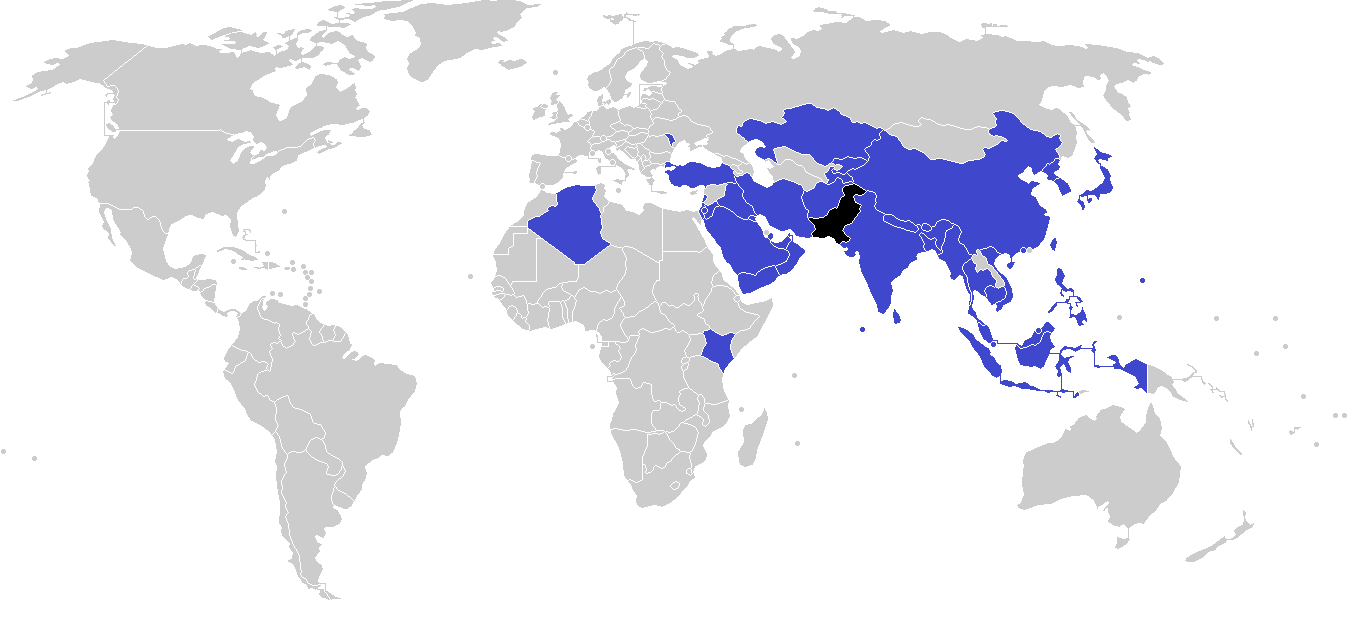
Opponents of Pakistan men's national football team, as of June 2019.

Last match updated: Maldives on 8 November 2026.

Key
Positive balance (more Wins)
Neutral balance (equal W/L ratio)
Negative balance (more Losses)

Pakistan national football team head-to-head records
Opponents	Pld	W	D	L	GF	GA	GD	Confederation
Afghanistan	8	5	2	1	9	5	+4	AFC
Bahrain	1	1	0	0	5	1	+4	AFC
Bangladesh	18	6	5	7	10	17	−8	AFC
Bhutan	3	3	0	0	13	1	+12	AFC
Brunei	1	1	0	0	6	0	+6	AFC
Cambodia	5	1	1	3	2	5	−3	AFC
China	8	1	2	5	8	23	−15	AFC
Chinese Taipei	5	3	1	1	7	5	+2	AFC
Djibouti	1	0	0	1	1	3	−2	CAF
Guam	1	1	0	0	9	2	+7	AFC
India	27	3	9	15	23	44	−21	AFC
Indonesia	4	0	1	3	2	9	−7	AFC
Iran	14	1	1	12	11	66	−55	AFC
Iraq	9	1	1	7	6	40	−34	AFC
Israel	2	0	1	1	2	4	−2	UEFA
Japan	3	1	1	1	5	6	−1	AFC
Jordan	9	0	0	9	1	34	−33	AFC
Kazakhstan	3	0	0	3	0	14	−14	UEFA
Kenya	1	0	0	1	0	1	−1	CAF
Kuwait	4	0	0	4	0	10	−10	AFC
Kyrgyzstan	4	1	0	3	1	7	−6	AFC
Lebanon	3	0	0	3	2	17	−15	AFC
Macau	3	2	1	0	7	2	+5	AFC
Malaysia	6	1	1	4	4	16	−12	AFC
Maldives	13	6	3	4	15	10	5	AFC
Mauritius	1	0	0	1	0	3	−3	CAF
Moldova	1	0	0	1	0	5	−5	UEFA
Myanmar (inc. Burma)	10	3	2	5	11	16	−5	AFC
Nepal	18	7	4	7	18	19	−1	AFC
Oman	4	0	1	3	2	12	−10	AFC
Palestine	6	0	0	6	2	13	−11	AFC
Philippines	2	0	1	1	3	5	−2	AFC
Qatar	1	0	0	1	0	5	−5	AFC
Saudi Arabia	2	0	0	2	0	7	−7	AFC
Singapore	7	2	1	4	9	17	−8	AFC
South Korea	3	0	0	3	1	19	−18	AFC
Sri Lanka	20	8	4	8	28	31	−3	AFC
Syria	2	0	0	2	0	7	−7	AFC
Tajikistan	4	0	0	4	1	12	−11	AFC
Thailand	7	1	0	6	7	24	−17	AFC
Turkey	4	0	1	3	9	16	−7	UEFA
Turkmenistan	1	0	0	1	0	3	−3	AFC
United Arab Emirates	5	0	0	5	4	17	−13	AFC
Vietnam (inc. South Vietnam)	3	0	2	1	5	7	-2	AFC
Yemen (inc. North Yemen)	5	1	1	3	6	11	−5	AFC
Total	257	58	44	153	243	586	−345	45 Nations

== Other records ==
=== Biggest victories ===
- Pakistan 7–0 Thailand (5 August 1960)
- Pakistan 9–2 Guam (6 April 2008)
- Pakistan 7–0 Bhutan (8 December 2009)

=== Biggest defeats ===
- Iran 9–1 Pakistan (12 March 1969)
- Pakistan 0–8 Iraq (28 May 1993)

== Honours ==
=== Regional ===
- South Asian Games
  - (gold) Gold medal (2): 1989, 1991
  - (bronze) Bronze medal (1): 1987
- SAFF Championship
  - (bronze) Third place (1): 1997

=== Friendly ===
- RCD Cup
  - (bronze) Third place (5): 1965, 1967, 1969, 1970, 1974
- Asian Quadrangular Football Tournament
  - (gold) Champions (1): 1952
  - (silver) Runners-up (2): 1953, 1955
  - (bronze) Third place (1): 1954
- Diamond Jubilee Football Tournament
  - (gold) Champions (1): 2026
- Merdeka Cup
  - (silver) Runners-up (1): 1962
- Quaid-e-Azam International Tournament
  - (silver) Runners-up (2): 1976, 1986
  - (bronze) Third place (2): 1982, 1987
- Philippine Peace Cup
  - (bronze) Third place (1): 2013

== See also ==
- Pakistan national football team
- Pakistan national football team results
- List of Pakistan national football team hat-tricks
