= Younus Changezi =

Pakistani footballer and politician

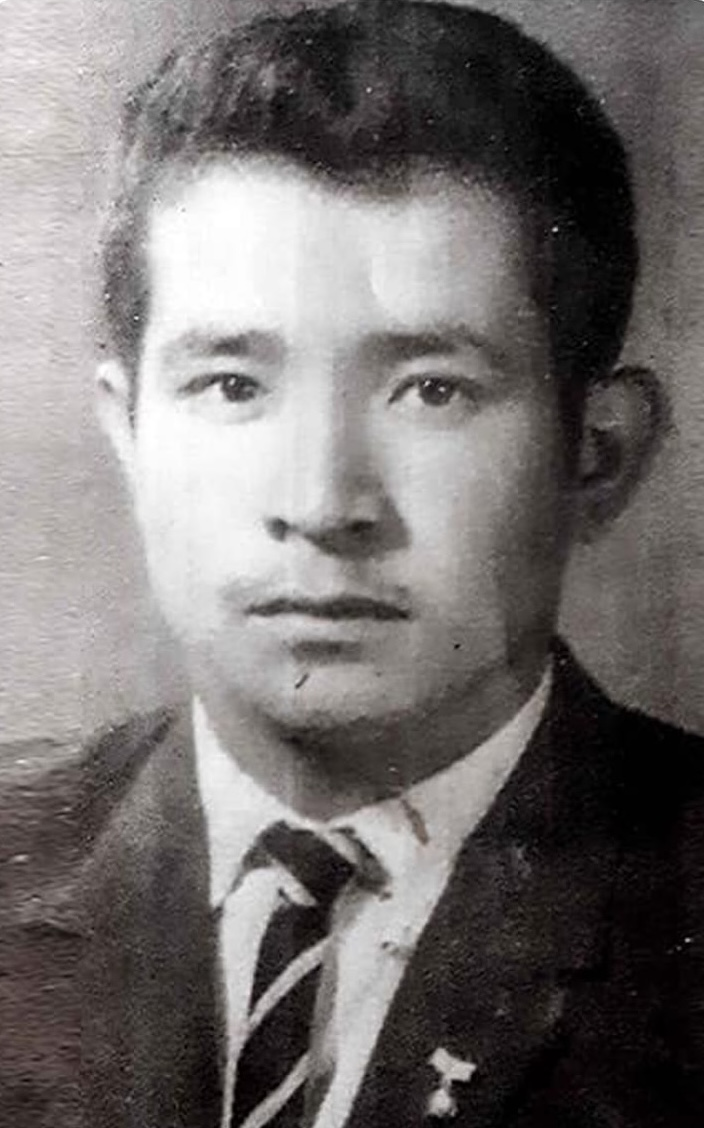

Personal information
- Full name: Muhammad Younus Changezi
- Date of birth: 4 November 1944 (age 82)
- Place of birth: Quetta, British India
- Position: Left winger

Senior career*
Years	Team	Apps	(Gls)
1960–??	Young Afghan Club		
- President Club Quetta
- Hazara Club Quetta
1966–1968	Victoria		
1970–1971	Pakistan Army		
1974–1977	Pakistan Army		

International career
1965	Pakistan Youth		
1970	Pakistan	1	(0)

Managerial career
- 1986: Pakistan
- 2011: Zarai Taraqiati
- * Club domestic league appearances and goals

Muhammad Younus Changezi (Urdu: محمد یونس چنگیزی; born 4 November 1944) is a Pakistani former footballer who played as left-winger, and former manager. Changezi played for the Pakistan national team in 1970, and was later appointed as manager in the 1980s. He also served as a soldier in the Pakistan Army in the 1971 war.

== Early life ==
Belonging to the ethnic Hazara community in Quetta, Younus was born on 4 November 1944.

He started playing football under the teaching of his older cousin Qayyum Ali Changezi, former captain of the Pakistan national team. Younus acquired his high school education from Cadet College Petaro, where he studied from 1966 to 1968 and completed his Intermediate. While in school, he was given the nickname of "Tarzan" for his athleticism, and has been known by this name all along.

== Club career ==
Changezi started his club career with Young Afghan Club in Quetta in 1960. He later represented President Club Quetta and Hazara Club Quetta. He was also affiliated with Ordnance Depot Quetta. In 1964, he featured in the National Youth Football Championship. He represented and later captained the Quetta Division team in the National Football Championship.

He joined the Pakistan Army in 1969 where he not only started his military journey but also captained the Pakistan Army team of the institution.

He also played for Victoria in Dhaka. Younus played a key role in Victoria's attacking line, however, was also involved in several controversies. His first year at the club, Younus alleged that he was physically attacked by Muhammad Umer, this would make the club lodge a complain to the East Pakistan Sports Federation, and Younus was eventually about to be forced to return to West Pakistan, but he stayed.

Later on in 1969, Younas, along with five other teammates, Ali Mohammad, Saleh Mohammad, Azim, were suspended up until 31st July 1969, due to alleged misbehaviour.

== International career ==
In 1965, Changezi was selected by the Pakistan youth national team, and playing in the left-out position, he toured the Soviet Union with the team. In the tour, he scored twice against Shinnik Club and Oryol Club.

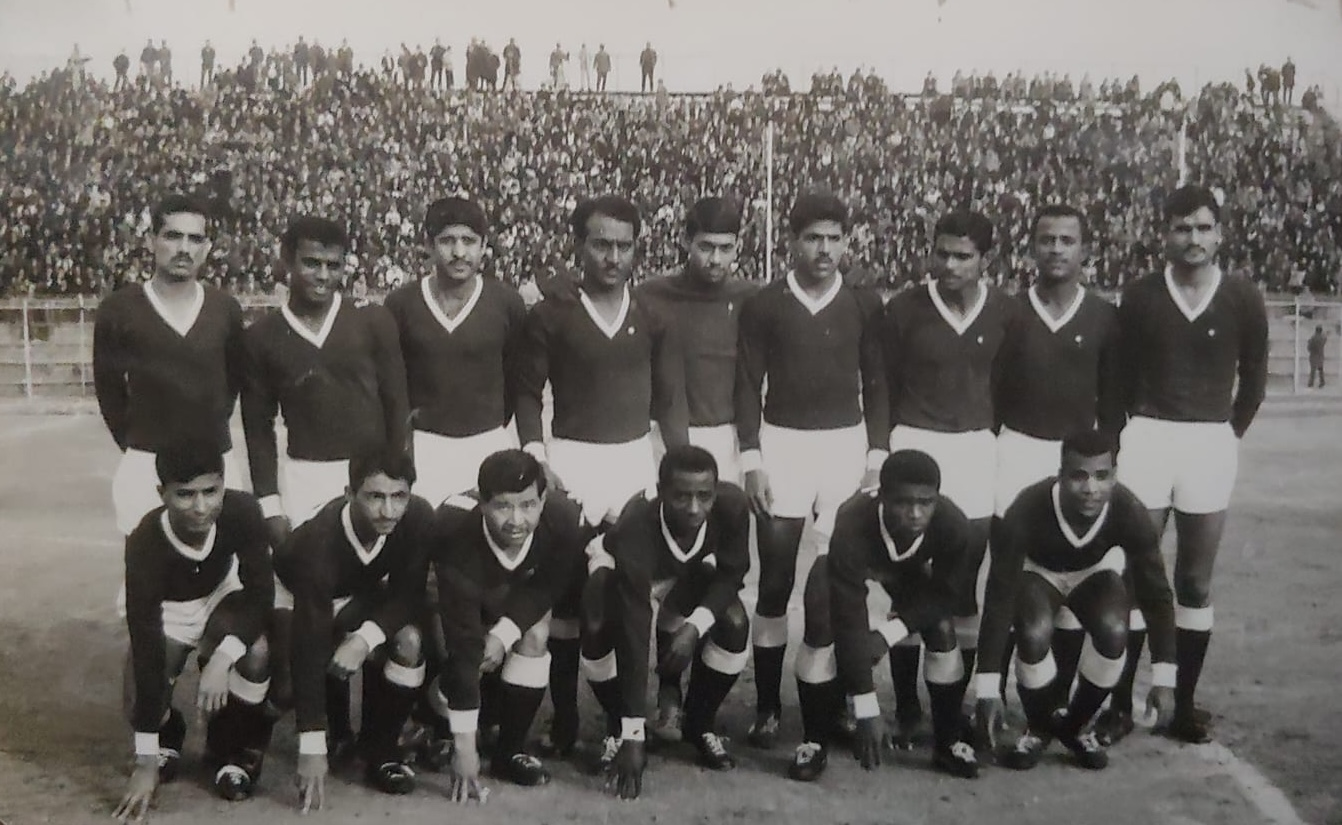
Changezi sitting third from left with the PFF XI team at the 1970 Friendship Cup

In 1970, Changezi was chosen to be a part of the Pakistan national football team which competed under the name of Pakistan Football Federation XI for the 1970 Friendship Cup in Iran. He later represented Pakistan in the 1970 RCD Cup playing against Iran and Turkey Amateurs.

== Managerial career ==
From 1985 till 1986, he toured Iran and Bangladesh as a manager-cum-coach, and was appointed head coach during the 1986 Fajr International Tournament in Iran.

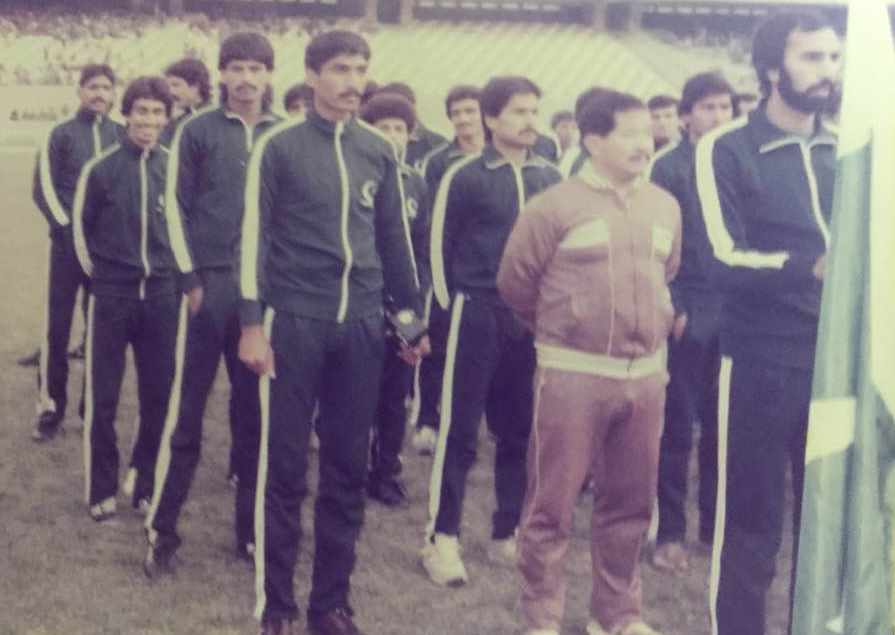
Changezi second from right as head coach of Pakistan at the 1986 Fajr International Tournament

He was also the chief selector for the Pakistan Football Federation in the 1989 and 2004 South Asian Games, the two occasions where Pakistan won the gold medal. In 1995, he attended a coaching course in Brazil and obtained an A-class coaching certificate.

In 2005, Changezi was manager of the Pakistan national under-17 football team with Shamim Khan as head coach, for the 2006 AFC U-17 Championship qualification. He resigned from the position a year later due to differences with the PFF.

In 2011, he was manager of departmental side Zarai Taraqiati, as well as being the unofficial coach of the Ashraf Sugar Mills side exclusively for the 2011 National Football Challenge Cup.

== Military career ==
After high school, Changezi joined the Pakistan Army, from where he retired as a lieutenant colonel. He was also held captive for four years as a result of the 1971 war.

== Political career ==
Changezi won the provincial elections in 2002 as an independent candidate, and became a Member of the Provincial Assembly of Balochistan. Upon his victory, he decided to join the pro-Pervez Musharraf Pakistan Muslim League (Q). As a member of the government, he was appointed the Provincial Minister for Environment, Forests, and Sports. He remained in this position until 2007.

Changezi lost his seat in the Provincial Assembly of Balochistan during the 2008 elections due to the tide against the pro-Pervez Musharraf political parties.
