= Ahmed Ali (footballer, born 1939) =

Pakistani former footballer

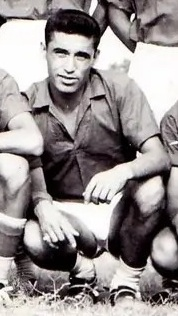

Personal information
- Full name: Ahmed Ali
- Date of birth: 7 March 1939
- Place of birth: Quetta, British India
- Date of death: 6 June 2004 (aged 66)
- Place of death: Quetta, Pakistan
- Position: Inside right

Senior career*
Years	Team	Apps	(Gls)
1950s	Hazara Club		
1960s	KMC		
1960s	Pakistan Western Railway		

International career
1965–1967	Pakistan		

Managerial career
- 1977–2003: Hazara Club
- * Club domestic league appearances and goals

Ahmed Ali (Urdu: احمد علی; 7 March 1939 – 6 June 2004) was a Pakistani footballer who played as a forward. He represented the Pakistan national football team in the 1960s.

== Early life ==
Belonging to the ethnic Hazara community, Ali was born on 7 March 1939 in Quetta.

== Club career ==
Ali played for various clubs in his playing days, notably for KMC and Pakistan Western Railway in the 1960s. He also represented the Quetta Divisional football team.

In 1967, Ahmed scored for KMC in a test match against Pakistan held at the KMC Stadium in Karachi.

== International career ==
In 1965, Ahmed was selected to play for Pakistan for a tour to Ceylon. He scored a goal in their final match of the tour against a Colombo XI in a 7–1 victory. He later represented the team at the 1965 RCD Cup. Ahmed was also selected in 1967 for the 1968 AFC Asian Cup qualification. He also played against the touring Dallas Tornado in 1967.

== Managerial career ==
In 1977, Hazara Club Quetta appointed former captain and international player Ahmed Ali as head coach, a position he held until 2003. Under his leadership, the team won around 17 invitational, regional, and domestic titles between 1977 and 2003.

== Death ==
Ali died on 6 June 2004. After his death, several memorial football tournaments have been held in his name.
