= Hussain Killer =

Pakistani footballer

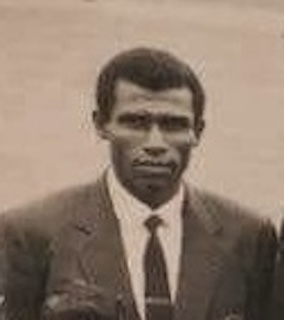
- Hussain in 1959

Personal information
- Full name: Muhammad Hussain
- Place of birth: Karachi, British India
- Place of death: Karachi, Pakistan
- Position: Right half

Senior career*
Years	Team	Apps	(Gls)
1956–1960	East Bengal		
1961–1965	Victoria SC		
1966	Dacca Wanderers		
1960s	KMC		

International career
1958–1960	Pakistan		
- * Club domestic league appearances and goals

Muhammad Hussain, commonly known as Hussain Killer, and sometimes misspelled as Hassan Killer, was a Pakistani footballer who played as a midfielder. He represented the Pakistan national football team and is regarded as one of the most prominent Pakistani footballers of the 1950s and 1960s. Hussain also played for East Bengal in India.

== Early life ==
Belonging to the Makrani Baloch community (also known as Sheedi) of African descent, Hussain hailed from the Lyari locality of Karachi.

== Club career ==
=== Early career ===
Hussain (second from left, sitting row) with Karachi Kickers in 1956.

Hussain represented representative side Karachi throughout 1950s at the National Football Championship. He played for the Karachi Kickers, helping them win the 1955 and 1956 editions of the Sait Nagjee Football Tournament.

=== East Bengal ===
In 1956, Hussain joined East Bengal alongside Moosa Ghazi. Although the latter left in 1959, Hussain stayed with the club till the end of 1960. Notably, he was praised for his performance against Mohun Bagan in the 1958 IFA Shield final which ended in a 1–1 draw. Down 0–1 due to a goal from Samar Banerjee, his shot just in the very next minute resulted in Mariappa Kempaiah volleying the ball into his own goal as the game leveled at 1–1 before halftime. Both teams tried to break the deadlock in the second half but canceled each other out as the game ended in a draw. The IFA decided to host a replayed final of the match later due to the unavailability of dates. He helped the side win the second game, resulting in East Bengal clinching the title. He also won the 1956–57 Durand Cup final with the club.

=== Victoria SC ===
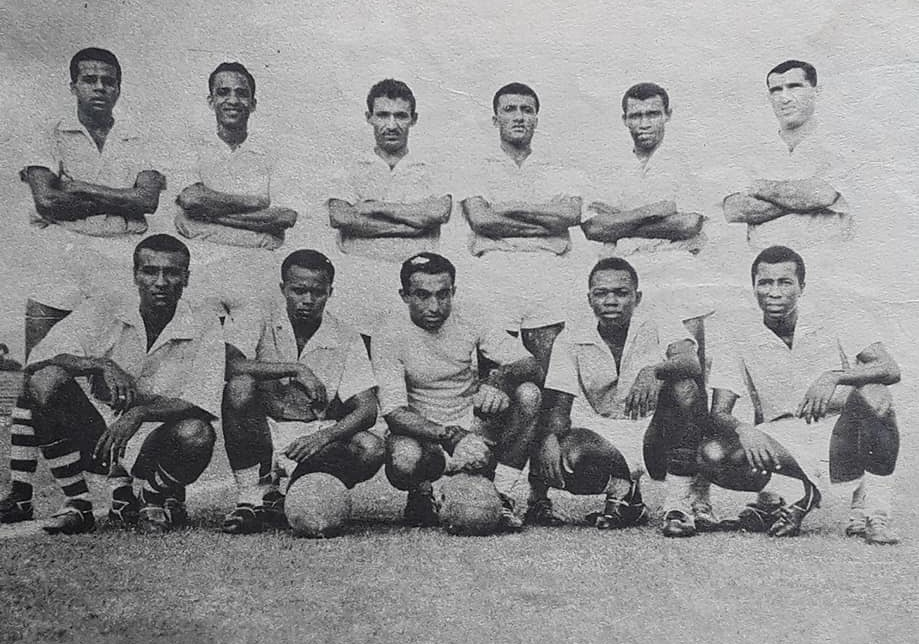
Hussain (second from right, standing row) with Victoria in 1962.

In 1961, Hussain was among the several West Pakistani footballers imported to the Dhaka Football League, being signed by Victoria Sporting, helping them to a runners-up position in his debut season. The following year, he helped the club win the league along with the 1962 Aga Khan Gold Cup and the Independence Day Football Tournament. Hussain would also help the club win the league in 1964.

=== Dhaka Wanderers ===
Later on in 1966, Hussain alongside Muhammad Umer, joined Dacca Wanderers Club, helping the team finish as runners-up in the league.

=== Later career ===
Hussain played for KMC in the 1960s, and won the All-Pakistan Mohammad Ali Bogra Memorial Football Tournament with the team in 1967. In 1969, he also captained Karachi Division which won the National Football Championship title.

== International career ==
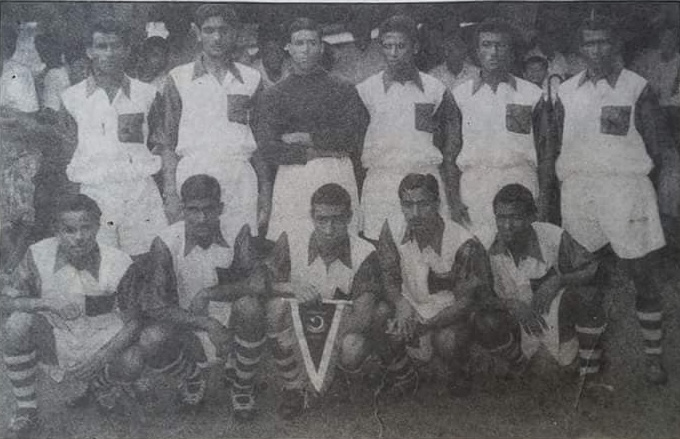
Hussain (standing far right) with the Pakistan national team during the tour to Burma in 1959

Hussain was first selected for the Pakistan national football team for the 1958 Asian Games in Tokyo. The next year, he toured Burma with the national team. He last played for Pakistan at the 1960 Merdeka Tournament. At the end of the tournament, Hussain was selected for the Eastern/Western Zones Combined football team for the proposed Asian All-Stars tour to Europe, which ultimately never materialised. Other Pakistan players selected for the combined team included Abid Hussain Ghazi, Qayyum Changezi, Ghulam Rabbani, and Moosa Ghazi.

== Death ==
Hussain, like other former Pakistan national team players, spent most his final decades in abject poverty until his death.

== Honours ==
East Bengal

- Durand Cup:
  - Winners (1): 1956–57
- IFA Shield:
  - Winners (1): 1958
- DCM Trophy:
  - Winners (1): 1957

Victoria SC

- Dhaka Football League:
  - Winners (2): 1962, 1964
  - Runners-up (1): 1961, 1965
- Aga Khan Gold Cup:
  - Winners (1): 1962

Dhaka Wanderers

- Dhaka Football League:
  - Runners-up (1): 1966

== See also ==
- List of foreign players for SC East Bengal
