= Hazara FC =

Pakistani football club

- Full name: Hazara Football Club Quetta
- Short name: HFC
- Founded: 1937; 89 years ago
- Coach: Zakir Hussain

Hazara Football Club is a Pakistani football club which was founded in 1937 and formed in British India. It participated in the regional Quetta Football League and is one of the oldest football clubs in Pakistan.

The club was one of the earliest teams in the Quetta region. Players such as Safdar Ali Babul, Haji Muhammad Juma, Haji Muhammad Hussain, Ahmed Ali, Zakir Hussain, Abdul Wahid Durrani, Qayyum Changezi, Taj Mohammad Sr., Muhammad Siddiq, Muhammad Ali Shah, Younus Changezi have previously played for the club.

== History ==
=== Pre-Independence (1937–1947) ===
Hazara Club Quetta was established in 1937. During a period when the Hazara community was organized around traditional structures such as the Khanwada (family), tribe, and ethnic lineage. Five individuals, Babu Qasim Ali, Haji Nasir Ali Khan, Haji Ghulam Haider, Muhammad Issa, and Nowruz Ali Babul, came together to establish the Hazara Football Club.

The team was associated with the 106th Hazara Pioneers, a regiment established in 1904, which also participated in rifle shooting and hockey. However, following its disbandment in 1933 due to political changes, The sense of sport fell, which was eventually picked up with football.

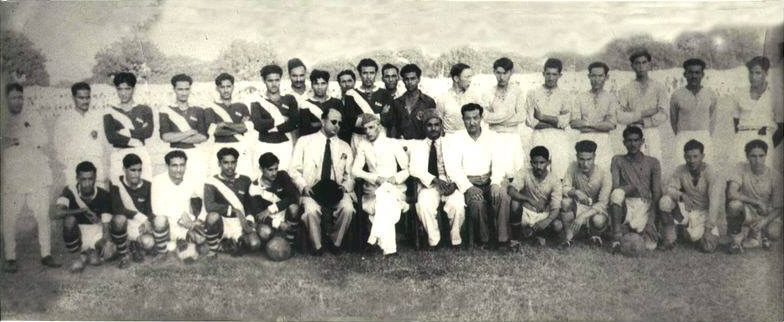
Usmania and Hazara Club Quetta (right) at the 1946 Punjab National Bank Golden Jubilee All-India Football Tournament with Muhammad Ali Jinnah

In 1940, Hazara Club toured Lucknow, British India. The club also played in several competitions in the Indian subcontinent in the early 1940s.

The club went on to win titles such as the All-India Wickham Cup in 1945. They made it to the semi-finals of the 1946 Punjab National Bank Golden Jubilee All-India Football Tournament.

=== Post-Independence (1947–1960s) ===
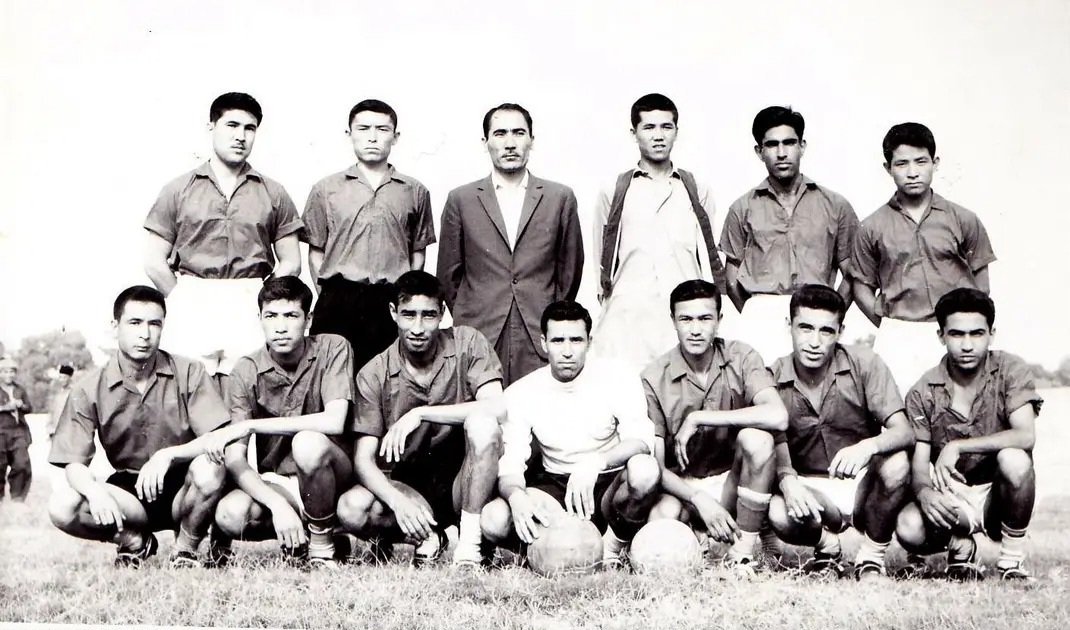
Hazara Club Quetta in the 1960s playing in the St. John Tournament

After Pakistan's Independence in 1947, the club continued to field talents such as Qayyum Changezi, Abdul Wahid Durrani, Ahmed Ali, and Safdar Ali Babul, who was both a footballer and a hockey player who represented Pakistan Hockey Team at the 1952 Helsinki Olympics.

The team played in the regional Quetta Football League. The club won the Pakistan Inter-Province Soccer Tournament, and also the All Pakistan Saint John Tournament which was a regional football tournament held in Quetta, that they had also won several times. By the early 50s to 60s, The club solidified itself as one of the best clubs from Quetta, winning several championships across the country, fostering players such as Qayyum Changezi and Younas Changezi.

In 1956, the team travelled to Iran, they left by Zahedan railway station and were invited to play exhibition matches in Abadan, Iran against Bargh Shiraz.

In the 1960s, majority of the Quetta Divisional team that participated in the National Football Championship were players from Hazara Club Quetta. The club continued to play in many tournaments in the 1960s.

=== Rise (1970s–2000s) ===
During the 1970s, Hazara Club went on to win several regional, divisional, international trophies. In 1977, The club appointed former captain and international player Ahmed Ali as a coach. He served the club as coach until 2003. During his tenure, it is said that around 30 Hazara players emerged to international status. He was also one of the most successful coaches in the history of the club, winning around 17 invitational, regional, and domestic trophies from 1977 till 2003.

=== Later years ===
The club went on to feature in several tournaments across Pakistan.

== Honours ==
=== National tournaments ===
- All Pakistan Usmania Football Tournament
  - Winners (1): 1985
- All Pakistan Abdul Rehman Shaheed Football Tournament
  - Winners (1): 1987
- All Pakistan Football Tournament
  - Winners (2): 1990, 2000
- All Pakistan Shah Abdul Latif Bhitai Football Tournament
  - Winners (1): 1998
- All Pakistan Flood Light Football Tournament
  - Winners (1): 1988
  - Runners-up (3): 1989, 1995, 1999
- All-Pakistan General Mohammad Musa Football Tournament:
  - Winners (1): 1968

=== Provincial tournaments ===
- All Balochistan Football Tournament
  - Winners (2): 1993, 2001

=== Railway tournaments ===
- Inter Railway Football Tournament
  - Winners (2): 1993, 1996

=== Other tournaments ===
- All Pakistan Football Tournament
  - Winners (1): 1992
- All Pakistan Flood Light Football Tournament
  - Runner-up (1): 2003
- All-India Wickham Cup
  - Winners (1): 1945
- Pakistan Inter-Province Soccer Tournament
  - Winners (1): 19??
- All Pakistan Saint John Tournament
  - Winners (2+): 19??
