= Saidul Khan Kaku =

Pakistani former footballer

Saidul Khan
Personal information
- Full name: Saidul Khan
- Date of birth: Unknown
- Place of birth: North-West Frontier Province, British India
- Date of death: Unknown
- Position: Left winger

Senior career*
Years	Team	Apps	(Gls)
1950s	Pakistan Army		
1960s	Usmania		

International career
1950	Pakistan		
- * Club domestic league appearances and goals

Saidul Khan (Urdu: سیدال خان) also known by his nickname, Kaku, was a Pakistani footballer who played as left winger. He represented the Pakistan national team on their first tour in 1950.

== Early life ==
Khan hailed from North-West Frontier Province, British India.

== Club career ==
Khan first played for Young Men Club of Peshawar, and represented the NWFP football team at the National Football Championship. He later joined the Pakistan Army football team. Khan also played for the Zamindar Club of Peshawar.

Khan also played with the Pakistan Combined Services football team that participated in the 1955 Army Football Tournament in Iran, which showcased army football teams from India, Iran, Turkey, Iraq, and Syria. He also played during Iran Services team tour of Pakistan in March 1956. Later on in his career, Khan would join Usmania.

== International career ==
In 1950, Khan was selected to represent the Pakistan national team for their tours to Iran and Iraq.

In 1951, Khan received a lifetime suspension after travelling with the Pakistan national team to Iran. The allegation against him was that he had refused to participate in a match, claiming that he was unable to play. However, reports noted that he later appeared in a match in Iraq, which was taken as evidence that he may have been unfit during the earlier fixture.

Later on, he was included in the provisional squads for the 1955 Asian Quadrangular Football Tournament, and the 1956 tour to the Far East, but failed to make the cut to the final squad.
