= 1958 IFA Shield final =

- Event: 1958 IFA Shield
Mohun Bagan	East Bengal
- East Bengal won after a replay

Final
Mohun Bagan	East Bengal
1	1
- Date: 26 September 1958
- Venue: East Bengal–Mohun Bagan Ground, Kolkata, West Bengal
- Referee: P. A. Some
- Attendance: 16,000 (estd.)

Replay
Mohun Bagan	East Bengal
0	1
- Date: 29 January 1959
- Venue: Calcutta Ground, Kolkata, West Bengal
- Referee: P. A. Some
- Attendance: 20,000 (estd.)

The 1958 IFA Shield final was the 66th final of the IFA Shield, the second oldest football competition in India, and was contested between Kolkata giants East Bengal and Mohun Bagan on 26 September 1958 first which ended in a draw and then a replay on 29 January 1959 at the East Bengal–Mohun Bagan Ground and Calcutta Ground in Kolkata respectively.

East Bengal won the replayed final 1–0 to claim their 6th IFA Shield title. B.Narayan scored the only goal in the replay final as East Bengal lifted their sixth IFA Shield title.

== Route to the final ==
Mohun Bagan		Round	East Bengal	
Opponent	Result	Round	Opponent	Result
International	2–0	Second Round	Banbehari District XI	2–1
Gorkha Brigade	3–1	Third Round	Western Railway	5–1
Jamshedpur XI	2–1	Quarter–Final	Wari	3–1
Mohammedan Sporting	1–0	Semi–Final	Andhra Police	1–0

== Match ==
=== Summary ===
The IFA Shield final began at the East Bengal-Mohun Bagan Ground in Kolkata on 26 September 1958 in front of a packed crowd as Kolkata giants East Bengal and Mohun Bagan faced each other in a Kolkata Derby. East Bengal reached their tenth final after defeating Andhra Police 1–0 in the semi-final, having won the title five times previously in 1943, 1945, 1949, 1950, and 1951. Mohun Bagan made their twelfth appearance in the final after they defeated another Kolkata giant Mohammedan Sporting 1–0 in the semi-final, having won it six times previously in 1911, 1947, 1948, 1952, 1954, and 1956.

Mohun Bagan started the attack in the very first minute as Pansanttom Venkatesh crossed a ball towards K. Pal but the latter could not bring it down under control and made a handball. East Bengal countered in the next minute as Moosa Ghazi headed a ball from a cross from B. Narayan but was saved by the Bagan custodian Abani Bose safely. Mohun Bagan took the lead in the twentieth minute after Samar Banerjee received a pass from Chuni Goswami and found the net with a powerful shot to make it 1–0. East Bengal equalized just in the very next minute after Mariappa Kempaiah volleyed the ball into his own goal trying to clear a shot from Hussain Killer as the game leveled at 1–1 before halftime. Both teams tried to break the deadlock in the second half but canceled each other out as the game ended in a draw. The IFA decided to host a replayed final of the match later due to the unavailability of dates.

=== Details ===
26 September 1958
16:00 IST

Mohun Bagan	1–1	East Bengal
Banerjee 20'		Kempaiah 21' (o.g.)

East Bengal-Mohun Bagan Ground, Kolkata
Attendance: 16,000 (est.)
Referee: P. A. Some

Mohun Bagan	East Bengal

GK	(India) Abani Bose
FB	(India) Sushil Guha
FB	(India) Sailen Manna (c)
HB	(India) Mariappa Kempaiah
HB	(India) Hussain Ahmed
HB	(India) Narsiya
FW	(India) Pansanttom Venkatesh
FW	(India) Samar Banerjee
FW	(India) K. Pal
FW	(India) Chuni Goswami
FW	(India) Raman

GK	(India) Sudhir Kumar Karmakar
FB	(India) Chitto Chanda
FB	(India) Subhasish Guha
HB	(Pakistan) Hussain Killer
HB	(India) Bir Bahadur Gurung (c)
HB	(India) Ram Bahadur Chettri
FW	(India) B. Narayan
FW	(India) Nilesh Sarkar
FW	(India) K. P. Dhanraj
FW	(India) Tulsidas Balaram
FW	(Pakistan) Moosa Ghazi

Match rules

- 60 minutes.
- Replay if scores still level.
- No Substitutes.

== Replay ==
=== Summary ===
The replay final began at the Calcutta Ground in Kolkata on 29 January 1959 after the first game ended in a 1–1 stalemate.

The match began at a fast pace as both teams tried to break the deadlock but canceled each other out in the first half as the game remained goalless. The breakthrough came in the third minute of the second half when B. Narayan latched onto a freekick from Tulsidas Balaram and took a powerful shot that hit the crossbar and hit goalkeeper Abani Bose and found the back of the net as East Bengal took a 1–0 lead. Mohun Bagan tried to make a comeback but the East Bengal defense led by Ram Bahadur Chettri held firm and the match ended in a 1–0 victory for East Bengal as they lifted their sixth IFA Shield title.

=== Details ===
29 January 1959
16:00 IST

East Bengal	1–0	Mohun Bagan
Narayan 33'

Calcutta Ground, Kolkata
Attendance: 20,000 (est.)
Referee: P. A. Some

East Bengal	Mohun Bagan

GK	(India) Sudhir Kumar Karmakar
FB	(India) Ram Bahadur Chettri
FB	(India) Subhasish Guha
HB	(Pakistan) Hussain Killer
HB	(India) Bir Bahadur Gurung
HB	(India) Tapan Chowdhuri
FW	(India) Ahmed Khan (c)
FW	(India) B. Narayan
FW	(India) Nilesh Sarkar
FW	(India) Tulsidas Balaram
FW	(Pakistan) Moosa Ghazi

GK	(India) Abani Bose
FB	(India) Sushil Guha
FB	(India) Sailen Manna (c)
HB	(India) Mariappa Kempaiah
HB	(India) Hussain Ahmed
HB	(India) Narsiya
FW	(India) Pansanttom Venkatesh
FW	(India) Samar Banerjee
FW	(India) K. Pal
FW	(India) Chuni Goswami
FW	(India) Raman

Match rules

- 60 minutes.
- Joint winners if both finals ends in a draw.
- No Substitutes.
