= Ram Bahadur Chettri =

Indian footballer

Ram Bahadur
Personal information
- Full name: Ram Bahadur Chettri
- Date of birth: 15 February 1937
- Place of birth: Dehradun, British India
- Date of death: 4 December 2000 (aged 63)
- Place of death: Dehradun, Uttarakhand, India
- Height: 1.70 m (5 ft 7 in)

Senior career*
Years	Team	Apps	(Gls)
1957–1967	East Bengal		

International career
1959–??	India	15	(?)
Medal record
Men's football
Representing India
Asian Games
Gold medal – first place	1962 Jakarta	Team
AFC Asian Cup
Runner-up	1964 Israel	Team
- * Club domestic league appearances and goals

Ram Bahadur Chettri (15 February 1937 – 4 December 2000) was an Indian footballer. He competed in the men's tournament at the 1960 Summer Olympics. He appeared with Calcutta Football League club East Bengal and captained the team in 1960–61.

== Club career ==
=== Early career ===
Ram Bahadur began his career in 1954, at his local team, Amar Jyothi Club, he also represented the Uttar Pradesh football team and Bengal.

=== East Bengal ===
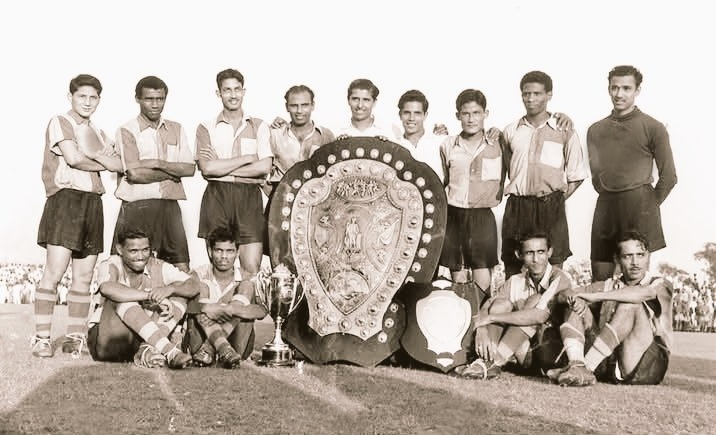
Ram Bahadur (extreme left, standing row) with East Bengal in 1958.

After the 1956 DCM Trophy, Ram Bahadur was recruited by East Bengal, the club at the time who were scouting for talent, recruited Bahadur along with Tulsidas Balaram. Bahadur would spend the next decade playing for the team until retiring in 1967. Ram Bahadur would also play an influential role in the team's midfield, being praised for his performances on several occasions.

== International career ==
In 1959, Ram Bahadur was selected for the Indian national team for the 1960 Asian Cup Qualifiers. The following year, he represented India for their participation at the 1960 Olympics. Two years later, he would play a key role in the 1962 Asian Games, helping the team win the competition. He also participated in the 1964 Asian Cup, contributing to India's runners-up position.

== Honours ==
East Bengal

- IFA Shield: 1958

India

- Asian Games Gold medal: 1962
- AFC Asian Cup runners-up: 1964

Individual

- East Bengal Best Midfielder of the Millennium

Bengal

- Santosh Trophy: 1959–60
