= 1956–57 Durand Cup final =

- Event: 1956–57 Durand Cup
East Bengal	Hyderabad City Police
2	0
- Date: 5 January 1957
- Venue: Delhi Gate Stadium, New Delhi, India
- Referee: A. N. Jayrana
- Attendance: 15,000 (estd.)

The 1956–57 Durand Cup final was the 53rd final of the Durand Cup, the oldest football competition in India. It was contested between Kolkata giants East Bengal and Hyderabad City Police on 5 January 1957 at the Delhi Gate Stadium in New Delhi.

East Bengal won the final 2–0 to claim their 3rd Durand Cup title. Balasubramanium and Moosa Ghazi scored the goals for East Bengal in the final as East Bengal lifted their third Durand Cup title.

== Route to the final ==
East Bengal		Round	Hyderabad City Police	
Opponent	Result	Round	Opponent	Result
Mughals	2–1	Second Round	New Delhi Heroes	3–2
Caltex Club	0–0; 3–0	Quarter–Final	Western Railway	2–0
Madras Regimental Centre	0–0; 0–0; 2–0	Semi–Final	E.M.E. Centre	2–1

== Match ==
=== Summary ===
The Durand Cup final began at the Delhi Gate Stadium in New Delhi on 5 January 1957 in front of a packed crowd as Kolkata giant East Bengal and faced Hyderabad City Police. East Bengal reached their third Durand Cup final after defeating the defending champions, Madras Regimental Centre, 2–0 in the semi-final, havinwon the tournament previously in 1951 and 1952. Hyderabad City Police made their fourth appearance in the final after defeating E.M.E. Centre 2–1 in the semi-final, having previously won the cup in 1950 and 1954.

Both East Bengal and Hyderabad City Police started the game positively, creating attacks but were denied by the strong defence of both teams. In the nineteenth minute, Anthony Patrick fouled Varahalu near the box, and Balasubramanium scored directly from the free-kick from 30 yards to give East Bengal the lead. Hyderabad tried to get back into the game but their forward line, consisting of Sussay, Mohammed Zulfiqaruddin and Yousuf Khan wasted multiple chances. East Bengal doubled their lead in the second half with just seven minutes remaining when Moosa Ghazi made a solo run past the defenders and scored for East Bengal to make it 2–0 as East Bengal held onto the scoreline and won their third Durand Cup title.

=== Details ===
5 January 1957
15:30 IST

East Bengal	2–0	Hyderabad City Police
Balasubramanium 19'; Moosa 53'

Delhi Gate Stadium, New Delhi
Attendance: 15,000 (est.)
Referee: A. N. Jayrana

East Bengal	Hyderabad City Police

GK	(India) Makhon Chatterjee
FB	(India) T. Abdul Rahman
FB	(India) James Fenn
HB	(Pakistan) Hussain Killer
HB	(India) Bir Bahadur Gurung
HB	(India) Mariappa Kempaiah
FW	(India) Muhammad Kannayan
FW	(India) Balasubramanium
FW	(India) J. Krishnaswamy "Kittu" (c)
FW	(India) Varahalu
FW	(Pakistan) Moosa Ghazi

GK	(India) Nabi
FB	(India) Sayed Khwaja Aziz-ud-Din
FB	(India) Yousaf Khan
HB	(India) Anthony Patrick
HB	(India) Sk. Kaleem
HB	(India) Muhammad Noor (c)
FW	(India) Syed Moinuddin
FW	(India) G.Y.S. Laiq
FW	(India) Mohammed Zulfiqaruddin
FW	(India) Sussay
FW	(India) Yousuf Khan

Match rules

- 60 minutes.
- Replay if scores still level.
- No Substitutes.
