= Usmania FC =

Pakistani football club

Usmania FC, alternatively spelled as Osmania FC, was an association football club based in Peshawar, active from the pre-partition period through the early decades of Pakistan's sport history. The club has also produced several players who went on to represent Pakistan at international level, such as Bachi Khan, Saidul Khan Kaku, Sammiudin, etc.

== History ==
=== Emergence (1930s–1940s) ===
In the 1930s, the team produced local players such as Ghulam Nabi (commonly known as Bachi Khan), who would later go on to represent the Mohammedan Sporting Club.

The club participated in the Rovers Cup in 1941, where they beat Bombay North in the first round by 4–3, with goals from Mohammad Aslam, Rahim Sr., and Rahim Jr. who scored a brace. They were then defeated by Muslim SC by three goals to one, marking their exit from the tournament.

In 1945, the team participated in the Punjab National Bank Golden Jubilee All-India Football Tournament. Where they lost to Zamindars Club in the second replay of the semi-finals. The team also took part in the next edition of the tournament held the next year. Where they were defeated by Hazara Club Quetta, with Ghulam Hussain of the opposing side netting in the goal, allowing their opponents to advance to the quarter-finals of the tournament.

=== Post-Independence (1940s–1960s) ===
After the Partition of India, Usmania Club continued to take part in regional tournaments. In 1949, Usmania Club along with Jinnah Gymkhana were invited to play a series of matches at Colombo, Ceylon. It is unclear whether the team toured to the country or not.

In 1954, the team progressed into the final of the All-Pakistan Aurangzeb Football Tournament, however, the team were defeated by local Karachi Bijli Club in the final by a scoreline of 2–1. The following year, the team reached the final of the Rizvi Soccer Tournament, where they defeated Hazara Reds, with Muhammad Anwar scoring the goal. It is unknown whether the team won the tournament or not.

In 1957, Usmania Club reached the final of the West Wing Soccer Championship, being defeated by Khyber Rifles (Combined) by 2–0, with the goals being scored by Parvez and Baez.

In 1958, the team made it to the final of the All-Pakistan Quaid-E-Millat Football Tournament, facing up against D.F.A Kohat. However, the team finished runners-up behind the divisional side with a five goals to nil loss. The following year, the team enrolled in the 1959 Aga Khan Gold Cup, and were set to play their first match against Bogra Cotton Mills, however, the team did not arrive in Dacca as scheduled, resulting in a win for their opponents.

In 1960, Usmania Club reached the final of the All-Pakistan Quaid-E-Millat Football Tournament, defeating Pakistan Army in the semi-finals. The team faced Karachi PWD in the final, where both teams played a replay and PWD lead by 3–0 at half-time. Nabi Khan, Muhammad Taqi, and Imam Bukhsh scored for PWD, Right-In Jalalabad reduced the margin to 3–1. Finishing the tournament at the runners-up position once again.

During the 1960s, Usmania Club participated in several domestic tournaments.

=== Later years (1970s–2000s) ===
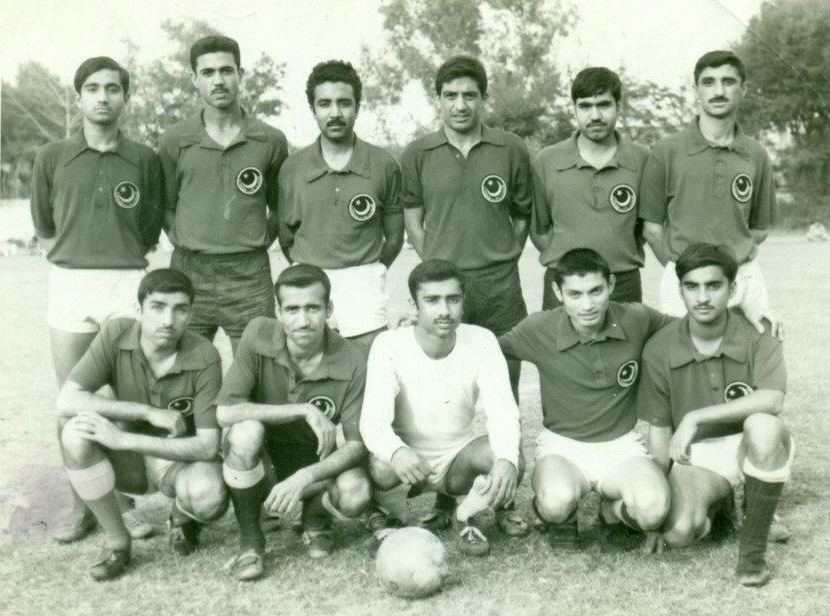
Usmania FC during the 1972 All Pakistan Mian Farooq Ahmed Sheikh Football Tournament

In 1972, the club won the second edition of the All Pakistan Mian Farooq Ahmed Sheikh Football Tournament, held at Peshawar. Against the Youngmen Peshawar Club by a scoreline of 2–1.

In 2004, Usmania competed in the District Peshawar Football Championship at the Tehmas Khan Football Stadium.

== Honours ==
=== Provincial Tournaments ===
- All-Pakistan Aurangzeb Football Tournament
  - Runners-up (1): 1954
- West Wing Soccer Championship
  - Runners-up (1): 1957
- All-Pakistan Quaid-E-Millat Football Tournament
  - Runners-up (2): 1958, 1960

=== Invitational Tournaments ===
- All Pakistan Mian Farooq Ahmed Sheikh Football Tournament
  - Winners (1): 1972
