= Keamari Muhammadan FC =

Pakistani football club

Keamari Muhammadan
- Full name: Keamari Muhammadan Football Club
- Short name: KMFC
- Founded: 1907; 119 years ago

Keamari Muhammadan Football Club is a football club based in Keamari, Karachi, Pakistan.

== History ==
Founded in 1907, it is one of the oldest football clubs in Pakistan.

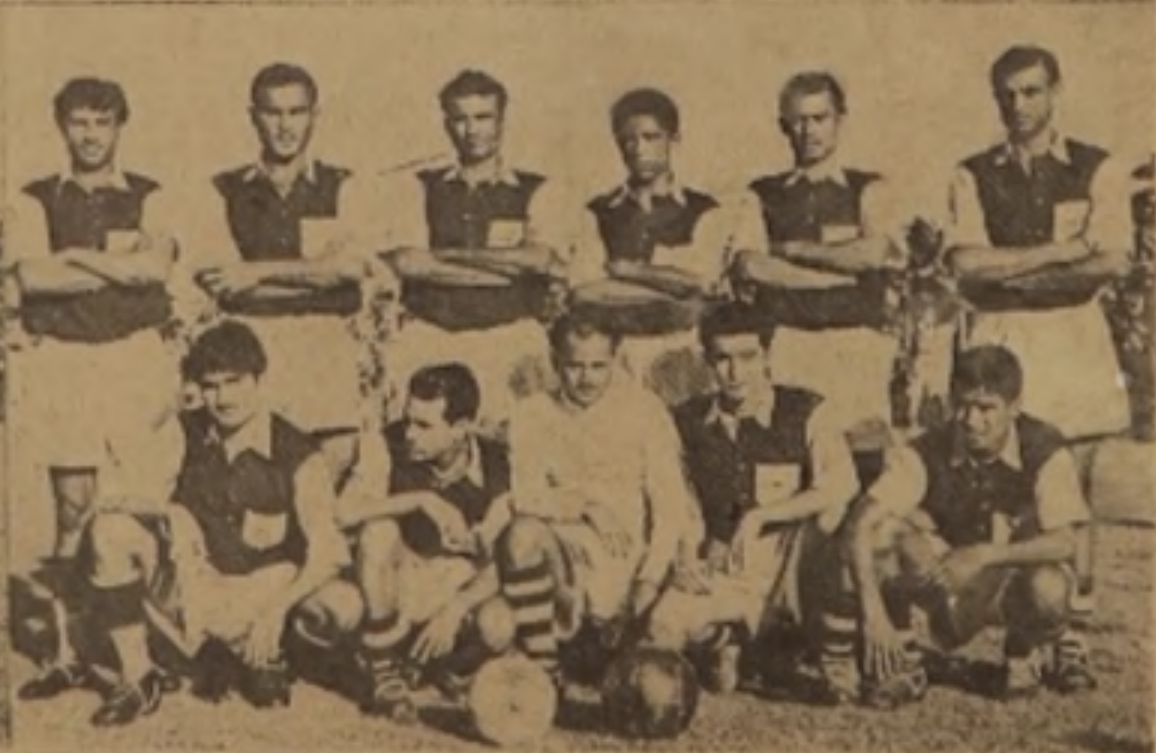
The 1958 Aga Khan Gold Cup runners-up Keamari Muhammadan

At the inaugural 1958 Aga Khan Gold Cup, Keamari Muhammadan finished runner-up after falling against Karachi Kickers by 0–2 in the final. In 1958 and 1959, the team won the Ronaldshay Shield in Dhaka consecutively. In 1958, the team also participated in the Rovers Cup in India.

In the 1950s and 1960s, the team had the services of Pakistan international players such as Moosa Ghazi, Abid Hussain Ghazi and Abdullah Rahi. The team competed in the Karachi First Division Football League.

The team won the 2006–07 edition of the Karachi Football League.

In 2023, the team participated in the KPT Football Challenge Cup, featuring Pakistan international cricketers Javed Miandad and Younis Khan as guests.

== Honours ==
=== Domestic ===
- Ronaldshay Shield
  - Champions (2): 1958, 1959

=== International ===
- Aga Khan Gold Cup (Note: The competition is widely regarded as the predecessor of AFC Champions League (held for the first time in 1967), since it was the first organized international competition that involved club teams around Asia, organized by the football authorities of East Pakistan, in collaboration with Asian Football Confederation (AFC).)
  - Runners-up: 1958
