= Abid Hussain Ghazi =

Pakistani footballer (1934–2016)

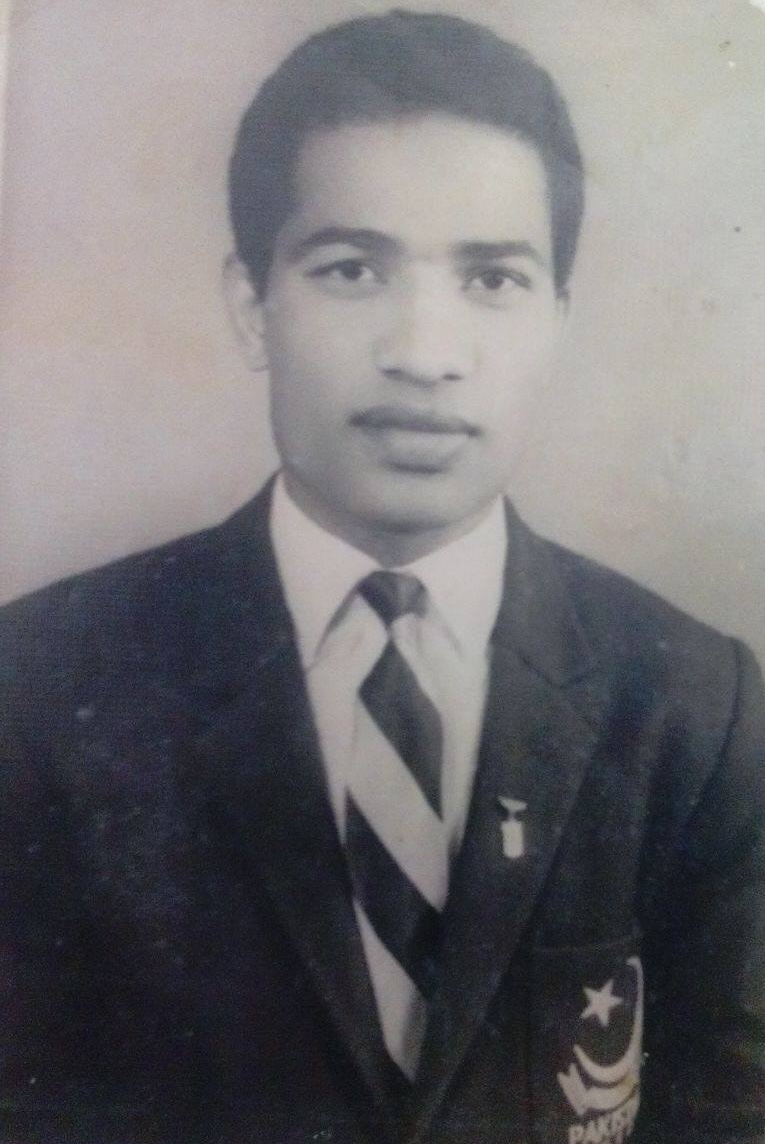

Personal information
- Full name: Abid Hussain Ghazi
- Date of birth: 1934
- Place of birth: Karachi, British India
- Date of death: 14 January 2016 (aged 81)
- Place of death: Karachi, Pakistan
- Position: Midfielder

Senior career*
Years	Team	Apps	(Gls)
1952–1957	Keamari Muhammadan		
1956–1957	Kolkata Mohammedan		
1958	Victoria		
1959–1965	Dhaka Mohammedan		
1960	Kolkata Mohammedan		
1966	Dacca Wanderers		
1967–1968	PWD		
1969	Dilkusha	8	(3)
1970	EP WAPDA		

International career
1956–1964	Pakistan		

Managerial career
- 1969–1970: EP WAPDA
- 1973: Punjab
- KESC
- * Club domestic league appearances and goals

Abid Hussain Ghazi (Urdu: عابد حسین غازی; 1934 – 14 January 2016) was a Pakistani footballer who played as a midfielder. He is considered one of the greatest Pakistani footballers of the 1950s and 1960s, and also captained the Pakistan national football team.

== Early life ==
Ghazi hailed from Keamari locality of Karachi in British India. He belonged to the Makrani Baloch community (also known as Sheedi) of Sudanese descent.

== Club career ==
=== Early career ===
Abid (second from right, sitting row) with Karachi Kickers in 1956.

Ghazi started playing football with Karachi club Keamari Muhammadan in 1952 alongside his brother Moosa Ghazi. He then represented Karachi in 1954 at the National Football Championship. He also toured India with Karachi Kickers the next year. He also played in the Calcutta League for Kolkata Mohammedan in India, from 1956 to 1957.

=== Victoria SC ===
In 1958, Ghazi played for Dhaka club Victoria SC in the inaugural edition of the Aga Khan Gold Cup. During his stay in the Dhaka League in the ensuing years, he also represented East Pakistan and Dacca Division at the National Football Championship. Ghazi represented the East Pakistan football team at the 1958 National Football Championship held in Multan. The team captained by Nabi Chowdhury made a surprising exit from the tournament in the quarter-finals after losing 1–3 to Punjab Red.

=== Dhaka Mohammedan ===
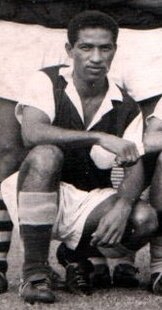
Ghazi with Dhaka Mohammedan in 1963

He also featured for Dhaka Mohammedan club in East Pakistan between 1958 and 1965. In 1959, he was an integral part of the Mohammedan team that defeated Karachi Municipal Corporation to lift the 1959 Aga Khan Gold Cup. The following year, he again lifted the 1960 edition trophy, this time with Kolkata Mohammedan. Ghazi was club captain in 1963 and led Dhaka Mohammedan to their fourth Dhaka First Division League title.

=== Later career ===
In 1966, he represented Dhaka Wanderers, PWD in 1967–1968, and Dilkusha in 1969.

Ghazi won the National Football Championship with Dacca Division in both 1961–62 and 1962. He was notably team captain in the 1961 edition.

== International career ==
Ghazi was first selected in 1956 touring countries like Sri Lanka, China, Hong Kong with the national team, Ghazi later featured in the 1958 Asian Games in Tokyo with the Pakistan national team under the captaincy of Nabi Chowdhury. Ghazi was also among the players present in the 1960 Asian Cup qualifiers hosted by India in Ernakulam in 1959, where Pakistan faced Iran, India and Israel twice each in the qualifiers. He was also selected for the 1960 Merdeka Tournament in Malaya under the captainship of Qayyum Changezi. After the tournament ended, Ghazi was selected for the Eastern/Western Zones Combined football team for the proposed Asian All-Stars tour of Europe, which ultimately never materialised. Other Pakistan players selected for the combined team included Hussain Killer, Qayyum Changezi, Ghulam Rabbani, and Moosa Ghazi.

When the Burma national team visited Pakistan for a friendly series in 1961, Abid played alongside his brother Moosa Ghazi, where the latter also captained the national team in one of the matches. Ghazi also featured with Pakistan at the 1962 Merdeka Tournament, where Pakistan finished runner-ups after falling against Indonesia in the final.

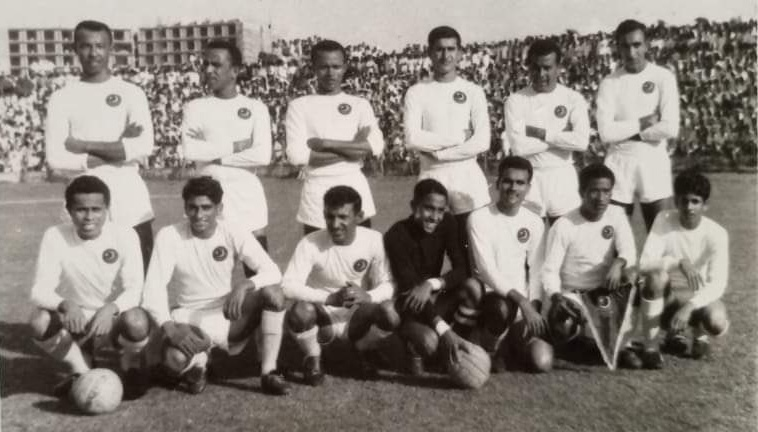
Ghazi sitting second from right to left as captain of Pakistan in 1964

In 1963, he featured in a four-match friendly series against China in their tour to Pakistan, and after a few months served as vice-captain behind Mohammad Amin at the 1964 Summer Olympics qualification. In his last year with the national team, Abid captained the national squad in an away friendly against China in October 1964, and later during Soviet Union based club Neftyanik tour to Pakistan a month later.

== Coaching career ==
In 1969, Abid coached East Pakistan WAPDA to win the Dhaka Second Division League while continuing his playing career. He began representing the club as player-cum-coach in the Dhaka First Division League from 1970.

== Personal life and death ==
Abid's brother Moosa Ghazi was also a footballer who played for the Pakistan national team. After the fall of Dhaka in 1971, both were arrested by the Indian Army and made prisoners of war. When he was released in 1973 and reached Lahore, he was made the coach of the Punjab football team. After his contract expired, Ghazi faced financial difficulties and took a job as a welder in the Karachi Shipyard. Later, KESC appointed Abid as the team's coach on a contract basis, who also started running a sports goods shop in Bhutta Village, but he was later forced to close it.

"I am ashamed that Pakistan’s former national football captain Abid Ghazi’s son sold all [his] belongings for [his] father’s treatment. Ghazi sahib is on his death bed in the poorest condition. He was Pakistan football team’s captain. Is that how a nation should treat its heroes?"

— Fakhar-e-Alam (@falamb3) on Twitter regarding Abid's condition on 8 December 2015.

On 6 May 2014, The News International reported that Ghazi was on death bed, and in dire need of financial help without anyone to support him. In December 2015, Pakistani singer Fakhar-e-Alam tweeted on his Twitter handle that Ghazi's son sold all his belongings for his father's treatment, and that he was in his poorest condition. He died soon after on 14 January 2016, at the age of 81.

== See also ==
- List of Pakistan national football team captains
