= List of Pakistan national football team hat-tricks =

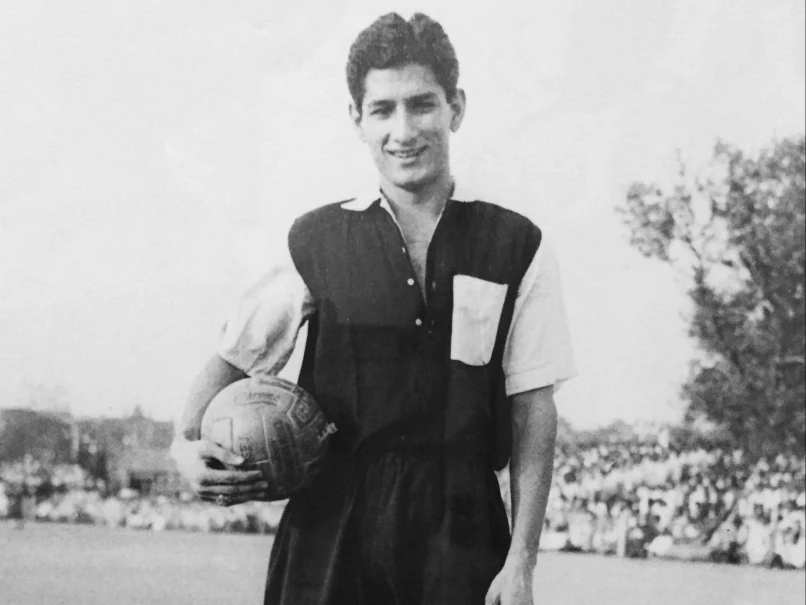
Masood Fakhri, the first hat-trick scorer for Pakistan

The first player ever to score a hat-trick (three or more goals in a match) for Pakistan in an international football match was Masood Fakhri. He achieved the feat in the 1954 Asian Games held in Manila, Philippines against Singapore on 2 May 1954, at the Rizal Memorial Stadium, where Pakistan won the match by 6–2. He completed the hat-trick in 5 minutes, scoring at the 42nd, 43rd and 47th minutes of the match. The next player to score a hat-trick was Qayyum Changezi a year later at the 1955 Asian Quadrangular Football Tournament, although he scored two goals of the match through penalty.

Muhammad Umer is the first recorded Pakistani footballer to have scored a hat-trick more than once against a full international side. Umer first achieved the feat in a friendly match against Singapore on 17 May 1958, where both teams reportedly fielded their main probable teams as preparation for the 1958 Asian Games. On 9 December 1959 during the 1960 AFC Asian Cup qualification, Umer scored another hat-trick in a 4–1 victory against Iran. The next year, Moosa Ghazi scored thrice in a 7–0 record victory against Thailand at the 1960 Merdeka Tournament. On 18 March 1967, during the opening match of the four-match friendly series against Saudi Arabia in Pakistan, Moosa Ghazi again scored a hat-trick in the eventual 3–1 victory. Inside-left forward Abdul Jabbar scored a hat-trick against Turkey at the 1967 RCD Cup. The striker Muhammad Ali Shah managed to score all three goals against Malaysia in a 3–2 win during the 1981 King's Cup on 13 November 1981. During the 1984 AFC Asian Cup qualification, Sharafat Ali scored thrice in a 4–1 victory against North Yemen.

After the 20th century, Gohar Zaman became first Pakistani footballer to score a hat-trick in a FIFA World Cup qualification match during the 2002 World Cup qualifiers. He completed the hat-trick within 40 minutes against Sri Lanka in a 3–3 draw. After several years, Pakistan tied its previous all-time highest record victory against Thailand in 1960, after Muhammad Qasim scored three times against Guam in a 9–2 win at the 2008 AFC Challenge Cup qualification, where the national team scored the highest number of goals in a match. A year later, Safiullah Khan surpassed the hat-trick number barrier after scoring four goals in a single match against Brunei at the 2010 AFC Challenge Cup qualification on 6 April 2009. The same year, Pakistan earned another record 7–0 victory at the 2009 SAFF Championship, where Arif Mehmood scored three times against Bhutan. This is also the most recent instance of a Pakistani player scoring a hat-trick in an international football match.

As of 26 March 2024, Pakistan have conceded nineteen hat-tricks, the most recent being scored by Musa Al-Taamari in a 0–7 defeat by Jordan at the 2026 World Cup qualification. Masoud Boroumand of Iran was the first player to score a hat-trick against Pakistan, on Pakistan's international debut in 1950.

== Hat-tricks for Pakistan ==
As of 8 December 2009, eleven players have scored a hat-trick for the national team and one have scored more than three goals in a single match.
Key

More than a hat-trick scored *

Table

Only FIFA-recognized international matches by the Pakistan national football team have been considered in the following list.

Result in the table lists Pakistan's goal tally first

| Date | Goals | Player | Opponent | Venue | Competition | Result | Ref. |
|---|---|---|---|---|---|---|---|
| 2 May 1954 | 3 | Masood Fakhri | Singapore | Rizal Memorial Stadium, Manila | 1954 Asian Games | 6–2 | |
| 17 December 1955 | 3 | Qayyum Changezi | (Myanmar) Burma | Dacca Stadium, Dhaka | 1955 Asian Quadrangular Football Tournament | 4–2 | |
| 17 May 1958 | 3 | Muhammad Umer | Singapore | Jalan Besar Stadium, Kallang | Friendly | 4–4 | |
| 9 December 1959 | 3 | Muhammad Umer | Iran | Maharaja's College Stadium, Kochi | 1960 AFC Asian Cup qualification | 4–1 | |
| 5 August 1960 | 3 | Moosa Ghazi | Thailand | Stadium Merdeka, Kuala Lumpur | 1960 Merdeka Tournament | 7–0 | |
| 18 March 1967 | 3 | Moosa Ghazi | Saudi Arabia | Lyallpur Stadium, Lyallpur, Pakistan | Friendly | 3–1 | |
| 28 November 1967 | 3 | Abdul Jabbar | Turkey | Dacca Stadium, Dacca | 1967 RCD Cup | 4–7 | |
| 13 November 1981 | 3 | Muhammad Ali Shah | Malaysia | National Stadium, Bangkok | 1981 King's Cup | 3–2 | |
| 11 October 1984 | 3 | Sharafat Ali | North Yemen | Salt Lake Stadium, Calcutta | 1984 AFC Asian Cup qualification | 4–1 | |
| 17 May 2001 | 3 | Gohar Zaman | Sri Lanka | Beirut Municipal Stadium, Beirut | 2002 AFC FIFA World Cup qualification | 3–3 | |
| 6 April 2008 | 3 | Muhammad Qasim | Guam | Zhongshan Soccer Stadium, Taipei | 2008 AFC Challenge Cup qualification | 9–2 | |
| 6 April 2009 | 4* | Safiullah Khan | Brunei | Sugathadasa Stadium, Colombo | 2010 AFC Challenge Cup qualification | 6–0 | |
| 8 December 2009 | 3 | Arif Mehmood | Bhutan | Bangabandhu National Stadium, Dhaka | 2009 SAFF Championship | 7–0 | |

== Hat-tricks conceded by Pakistan ==
As of 26 March 2024, Pakistan have conceded nineteen hat-tricks in total.
Key

More than a hat-trick scored *

Table
Result in the table lists Pakistan's goal tally first

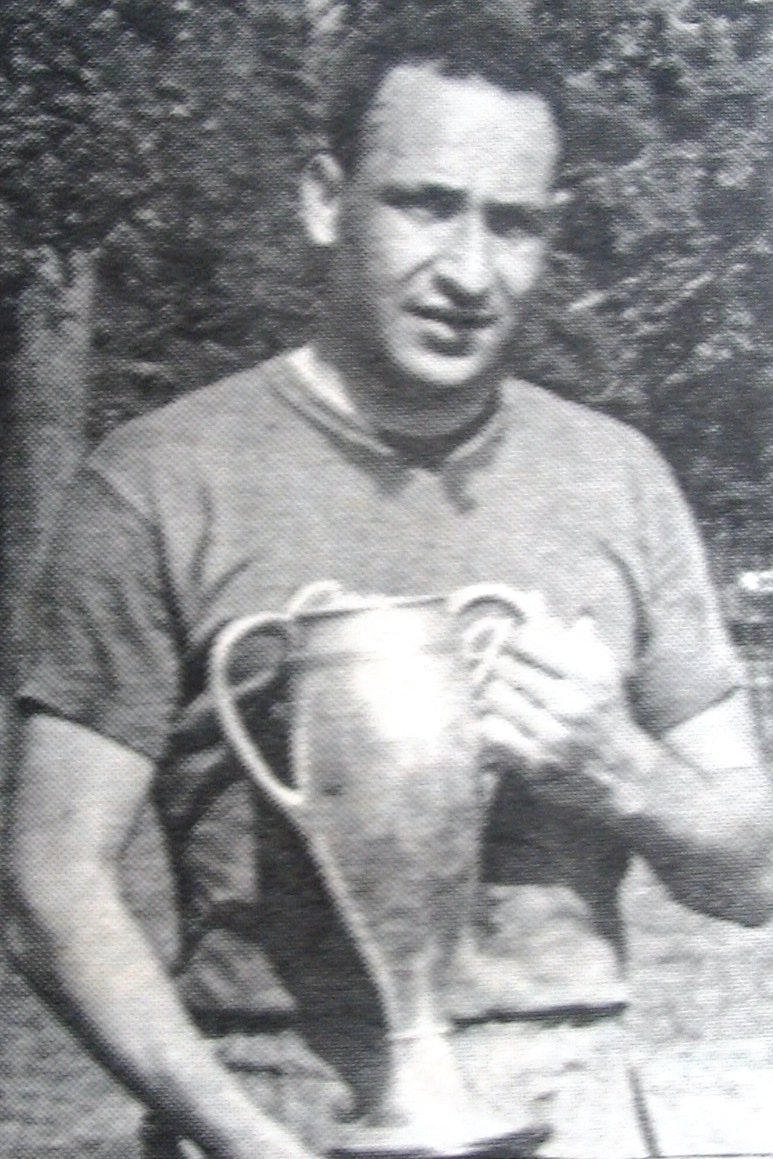
Masoud Boroumand of Iran was the first player to score a hat-trick against Pakistan, on their international debut.

| Date | Goals | Player | Opponent | Venue | Competition | Result | Ref. |
|---|---|---|---|---|---|---|---|
| 27 October 1950 | 3 | Masoud Boroumand | Iran | Amjadieh Stadium, Tehran | Friendly | 1–5 | |
| 26 December 1954 | 3 | Puran Bahadur Thapa | India | Calcutta FC Ground, Calcutta | 1954 Asian Quadrangular Football Tournament | 1–3 | |
| 17 May 1958 | 3 | Arthur Koh | Singapore | Jalan Besar Stadium, Kallang | Friendly | 4–4 | |
| 14 August 1960 | 3 | Omo Suratmo | Indonesia | Stadium Merdeka, Kuala Lumpur | 1960 Merdeka Tournament | 0–4 | |
| 12 March 1969 | 3 | Ali Jabbari | Iran | Tehran, Iran | 1969 Friendship Cup | 1–9 | |
| 3 September 1974 | 3 | Gholam Hossein Mazloumi | Iran | Amjadieh Stadium, Tehran | 1974 Asian Games | 0–7 | |
| 29 September 1986 | 3 | Piyapong Pue-on | Thailand | Daegu Stadium, Daegu | 1986 Asian Games | 0–6 | |
| 25 September 1990 | 3 | Hwang Sun-hong | South Korea | Fengtai Sports Center, Beijing | 1990 Asian Games | 0–7 | |
| 27 September 1990 | 3 | V. Sundramoorthy | Singapore | Xiannongtan Stadium, Beijing | 1990 Asian Games | 1–6 | |
| 18 August 1992 | 4* | Serghei Alexandrov | Moldova | Amman International Stadium, Amman | 1992 Jordan International Tournament | 0–5 | |
| 22 May 1993 | 3 | Cai Sheng | China | Al-Hassan Stadium, Irbid | 1994 FIFA World Cup qualification | 0–5 | |
| 11 June 1997 | 3 | Viktor Zubarev | Kazakhstan | Railway Stadium, Lahore | 1998 FIFA World Cup qualification | 0–7 | |
| 26 September 1999 | 3 | I. M. Vijayan | India | Kathmandu | 1999 South Asian Games | 2–5 | |
| 13 May 2001 | 3 | Haitham Zein | Lebanon | Beirut Municipal Stadium, Beirut | 2002 FIFA World Cup qualification | 0–6 | |
| 28 May 2001 | 4* | Kiatisuk Senamuang | Thailand | Suphachalasai Stadium, Bangkok | 2002 FIFA World Cup qualification | 0–6 | |
| 22 October 2007 | 4* | Mahdi Karim | Iraq | Punjab Stadium, Lahore | 2010 FIFA World Cup qualification | 0–7 | |
| 4 April 2008 | 3 | Kasun Jayasuriya | Sri Lanka | Chungshan Stadium, Taipei | 2008 AFC Challenge Cup qualification | 1–7 | |
| 21 June 2023 | 3 | Sunil Chhetri | India | Sree Kanteerava Stadium, Bangalore | 2023 SAFF Championship | 0–4 | |
| 26 March 2024 | 3 | Musa Al-Taamari | Jordan | Amman International Stadium, Amman | 2026 World Cup qualification | 0–7 | |

== See also ==
- Pakistan national football team records and statistics
