= Qayyum Changezi =

Pakistani footballer (1935 – 2005)

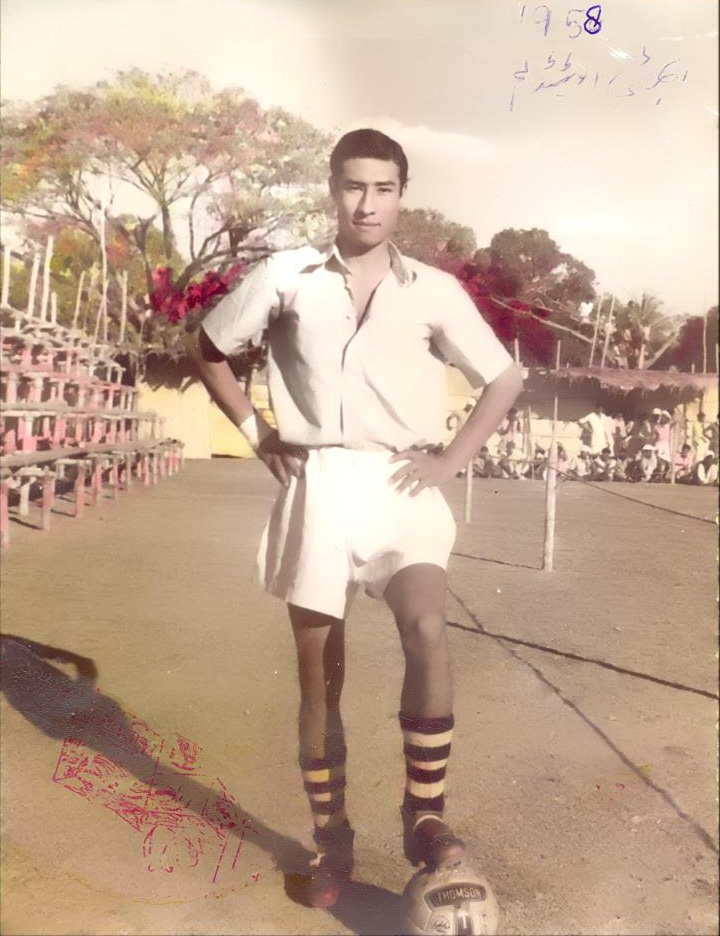
- Changezi in 1958

Personal information
- Full name: Abdul Qayyum Ali Khan Changezi
- Date of birth: 25 December 1935
- Place of birth: Quetta, British India
- Date of death: 25 June 2005 (aged 69)
- Place of death: Lahore, Pakistan
- Positions: Forward; full-back

Youth career
- Hazara Club

Senior career*
Years	Team	Apps	(Gls)
1950	Afghan Club Quetta		
1950s–1960s	Hazara Club		
1963	Dhaka Mohammedan	20	(27)
1963–1966	Pakistan Western Railway		

International career
1955–1963	Pakistan		(9)

Managerial career
- 1977: Shaheen XI
- * Club domestic league appearances and goals

Abdul Qayyum Ali Khan Changezi (Urdu: عبدالقیوم علی خان چنگیزی; 25 December 1935 – 25 June 2005), commonly known as Qayyum Changezi, was a Pakistani footballer. A versatile player, Changezi played in multiple positions, including forward in the centre or as an inside left, and as full back. A former captain and key player of the Pakistan national team in the nation's early years, Changezi is widely considered as one of the greatest Pakistani footballers of all time.

== Early life ==
Belonging to the ethnic Hazara community, Changezi was born in Quetta in the Baluchistan Agency of British India on 25 December 1935. His father Haji Nasir Ali Khan was member of the All-India Muslim League and served as soldier in the 106th Hazara Pioneers infantry of the British Indian Army and later for Pakistan during the Indo-Pakistani war of 1947–1948.

== Club career ==
=== Early career ===
Qayyum (fourth from right, standing row) with Karachi Kickers in 1956.

Qayyum developed an interest in football while attending high school, playing for Hazara Club of Quetta in his youth until making his senior debut in 1950 with Afghan Club Quetta. He also played as guest player to tour in club tournaments in Iran and India with Karachi Kickers and Karachi Mohammedan, and in 1956 again with Karachi Kickers and Hazara Club. In 1955, after winning the Seth Nagji Amarsee Memorial Football Tournament in Kozhikode with Karachi Kickers by defeating Kannur Gymkhana 2–0, with Changezi scoring in the final. He was praised for his performance, and reportedly carried out of the Mananchira ground in Kozhikode by local fans on his shoulders after the final. The same year, he represented Keamari Union at the 1955 Rovers Cup.

In 1953, Changezi was first selected by the Balochistan regional selection team in the National Football Championship, and was a member of the Balochistan team that won the title in 1956 by defeating Pakistan Western Railway in Karachi on 11 November 1956, where he scored one goal in the final 2–1 victory, and was declared player of the year. Later on in 1959 under his captainship, Balochistan defeated East Pakistan in Hyderabad on 7 November 1959, achieving their second league title. In the same tournament, he scored 6 goals in the 9–0 victory against Sindh Green.

In 1960, Changezi was suspended for a year by the Balochistan Football Federation due to misbehaviour in a trial match held at Quetta. However, Nonetheless, he still participated with the team in the tournament.

When the National Football Championship structure in Pakistan transitioned from provincial to divisional based clubs in 1961, he subsequently represented Quetta Division and Faisalabad Division.

=== Dhaka Mohammedan ===
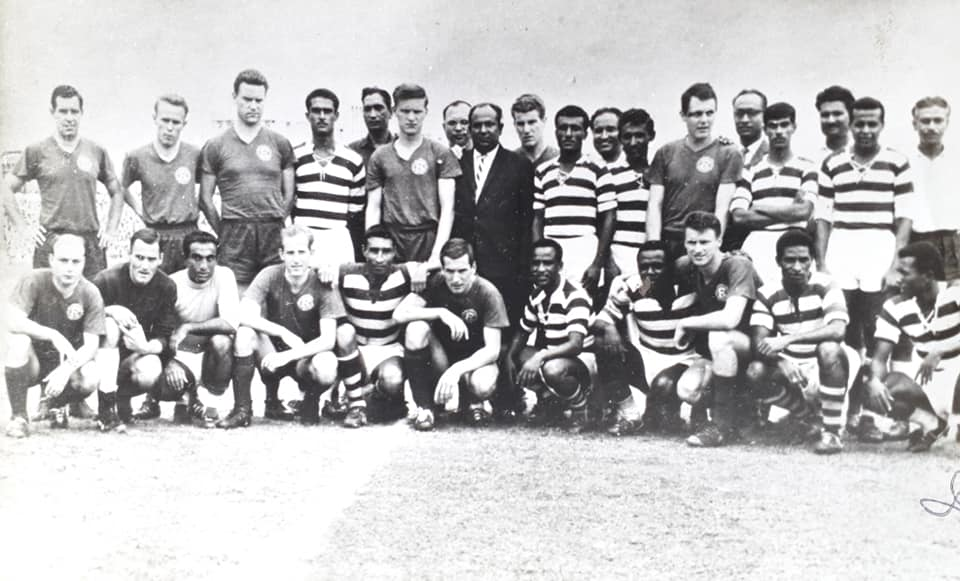
Changezi sitting fifth from left before the match between East Pakistan and Fortuna Düsseldorf

In 1963, Changezi also represented Dhaka Mohammedan winning the Dhaka First Division League and finishing top scorer of the tournament with 27 goals.

A few months later during a 1963 global tour, Germany's Bundesliga club Fortuna Düsseldorf faced aircraft issues, leading to an unexpected stay in Pakistan. Fortuna played against the East Pakistan football team selection in Dacca, which included Changezi as captain, where he scored East Pakistan's consolation goal from a long-distance free-kick in the 39th minute in a 1–4 defeat. The German side reportedly offered a playing contract to Changezi in his last playing years, which the latter ultiumately declined.

=== Pakistan Western Railway ===
Changezi later joined Pakistan Western Railway. Under his captainship, Railway ended up in the second position in 15th and 16th National Championship in 1963 and 1965, after falling twice to Karachi, in the finals held in the cities of Karachi and Peshawar respectively, He played for Railway till 1966.

== International career ==
=== Early years (1955–1958) ===
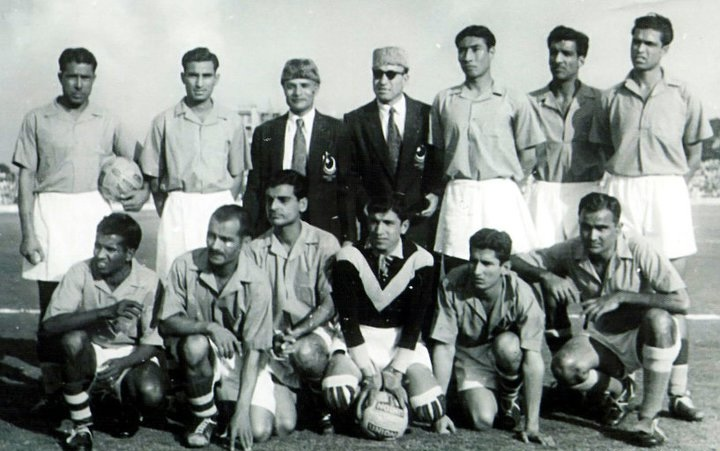
Changezi (third standing from right to left), with the Pakistan national team in 1955

Changezi made his international debut with the Pakistan national team during the 1955 Asian Quadrangular Football Tournament. On 17 December 1955, Changezi scored a hat-trick on his debut for Pakistan, including two penalty goals against Burma, becoming the second Pakistani player to do so after Masood Fakhri. In 1956, he toured Ceylon, Singapore and China with the national team. During this time, he transitioned from his position as forward to fullback, following an injury of the team regular defender Abdul Haq. In 1958, Changezi was omitted from the squad for the 1958 Asian Games due to misbehaviour.

=== Captaincy (1959–1960) ===
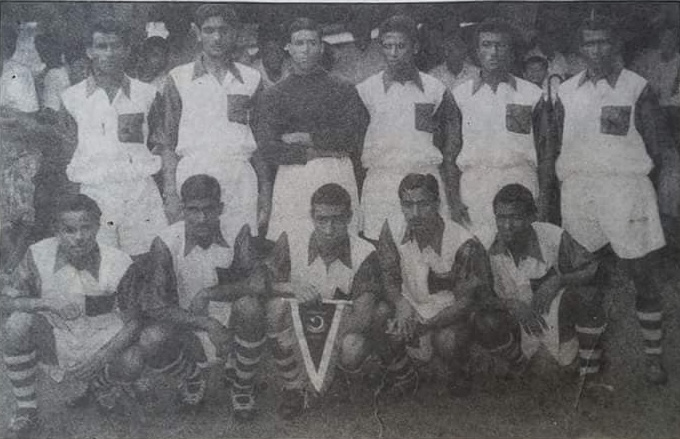
Changezi leading the Pakistan national team during a tour to Burma in 1959.

The next year, he was included in the squad for a tour to Burma. In late 1959, Changezi captained the team in the 1960 Asian Cup qualifiers hosted in Kerala, India, where Pakistan faced Iran, India and Israel twice each in the qualifiers. Although Israel managed to qualify by topping the group, Pakistan achieved a memorable victory over Iran by 4–1 and secured a draw against Israel, finishing in third place in the group, ahead of hosts India but behind Iran. Changezi along with fellow national teammate Abdul Ghafoor were also the only Pakistani players selected to be part of the preliminary West Asian Region All-Stars team after the tournament.

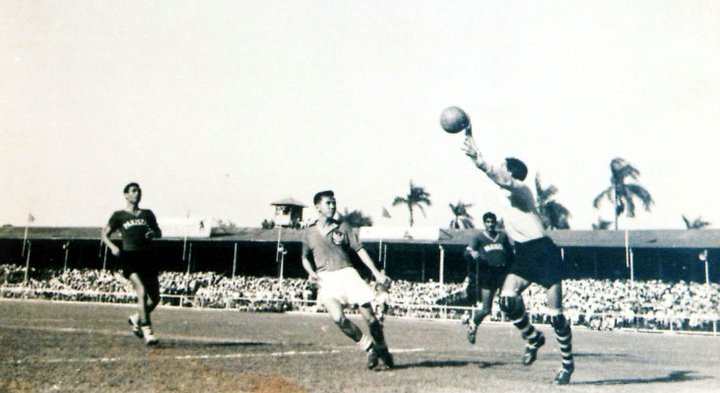
Changezi (far left) during a friendly match against Indonesia in 1960

Changezi also captained during the 1960 Merdeka Tournament hosted in Malaya. Under his captaincy, Pakistan recorded some famous victories including a 7–0 walloping of Thailand, and a 3–1 win over then Asian powerhouses Japan. At the end of the tournament, Changezi was selected for the Eastern/Western Zones Combined football team for the proposed Asian All-Stars tour of Europe, which ultimately never materialised. Other Pakistan players selected for the combined team included Abid Hussain Ghazi, Hussain Killer, Ghulam Rabbani, and Moosa Ghazi. On 15 August 1960, he played as starter along with Rabbani for the Eastern/Western Zones Combined football team against Central Zone Combined, in a trial match for the tour. Under his captainship, Pakistan also played friendly matches shortly after the tournament against South Vietnam, Singapore, and once again a match against Indonesia.

=== Later years (1961–1963) ===
In 1961, he featured in three friendly matches when Burma toured East Pakistan. Although Changezi was not included in the squad for the 1962 edition of the Merdeka Tournament, in 1963 Changezi played a series of home friendly games against China under the captainship of Muhammad Umer, marking his final appearances for Pakistan.

== Managerial career ==
In 1977, Qayyum was appointed as manager of a national selection named Shaheen under the captainship of Ghulam Sarwar Sr. which toured in the Afghanistan Republic Day Festival Cup in Kabul.

== Personal life and death ==
Qayyum was married on April 16, 1961.

His younger cousin Younus Changezi also played for the Pakistan national team from the 1960s till early 1970s, and was later appointed as manager of the national team in the 1980s. In 2003, Qayyum Changezi replaced M.N. Jehan as chairman of the selection committee of the Pakistan Football Federation by Arshad Khan Lodhi, following the newly elected president Faisal Saleh Hayat.

Changezi died on 25 June 2005 in Lahore, due to a heart attack. His dead body was transported to his native city Quetta for burial. (Note: Although the source indicate he died aged 80, Changezi was born in 1935, dying near the age of 70.)

== Legacy ==
In 2014, the Qayyum Papa Stadium in Mari Abad in Quetta was inaugurated after his name.

== Career statistics ==
=== International goals ===
Scores and results list Pakistan's goal tally first, score column indicates score after each Changezi goal.

List of international goals scored by Qayyum Changezi
No.	Date	Venue	Opponent	Score	Result	Competition	Ref.
1	17 December 1955	Dacca Stadium, Dhaka, East Pakistan	Burma		4–2	1955 Asian Quadrangular Football Tournament	
2	17 December 1955	Dacca Stadium, Dhaka, East Pakistan	Burma		4–2	1955 Asian Quadrangular Football Tournament	
3	17 December 1955	Dacca Stadium, Dhaka, East Pakistan	Burma		4–2	1955 Asian Quadrangular Football Tournament	
4	26 August 1956	Government Services Ground, Colombo, Ceylon	Ceylon	1–0	5–3	Friendly	
5	26 August 1956	Government Services Ground, Colombo, Ceylon	Ceylon	4–3	5–3	Friendly	
6	9 September 1956	Jalan Besar Stadium, Kallang, Singapore	Singapore	1–1	1–1	Friendly	
7	15 December 1959	Maharaja's College Stadium, Ernakulam, India	Iran		1–4	1960 AFC Asian Cup qualification	
8	5 August 1960	Stadium Merdeka, Kuala Lumpur, Malaya	Thailand	3–0	7–0	1960 Merdeka Tournament	
9	18 August 1960	Singapore	South Vietnam	1–0	2–2	Friendly	

== Honours ==
=== Balochistan ===
- National Football Championship:
  - Winners (2): 1956, 1959

=== Pakistan Western Railway ===
- National Football Championship
  - Runner-up: 1963, 1965

=== Dhaka Mohammedan ===
- Dhaka First Division League:
  - Winners (1): 1963

Individual

- 1963 − Dhaka First Division League top scorer: 27 goals

== See also ==
- List of Pakistan national football team captains
- List of Pakistan national football team hat-tricks

== Bibliography ==
- Dulal, Mahmud (2014). পাকিস্তান জাতীয় দল বাঙালি খেলোয়াড় (transl. Bengali players in the Pakistan national team) (in Bengali). Bishhoshahitto Bhobon.
- Dineo, Paul; Mills, James (2001). Soccer in South Asia: Empire, Nation, Diaspora. London, United Kingdom: Frank Cass Publishers. ISBN 978-0-7146-8170-2. Archived from the original on 25 July 2022.
