= Karachi Kickers FC =

Pakistani football club

Karachi Kickers
- Full name: Karachi Kickers
- Short name: KK
- League: PFF League
- 2009–10: Group stage

Karachi Kickers is a Pakistani football club based in Karachi. Karachi United competed in the Karachi Football League, one of the top leagues of Karachi. It last competed in the 2009–10 PFF League.

The club was one of the most successful teams in the early football history of Pakistan, winning the Sait Nagjee Football Tournament in 1955 and 1956, and the Aga Khan Gold Cup in 1958. It has also included early football players of Pakistan such as Dad Muhammad, Muhammad Umer, Hussain Killer, Qayyum Changezi and Abdul Ghafoor.

The club also has a women's team.

== History ==
=== Emergence and dominance (1950s) ===
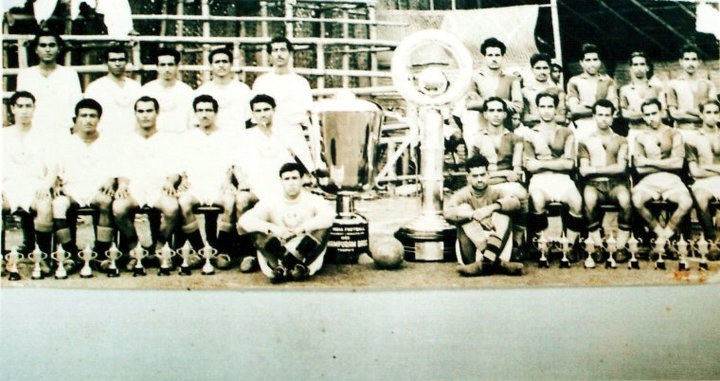
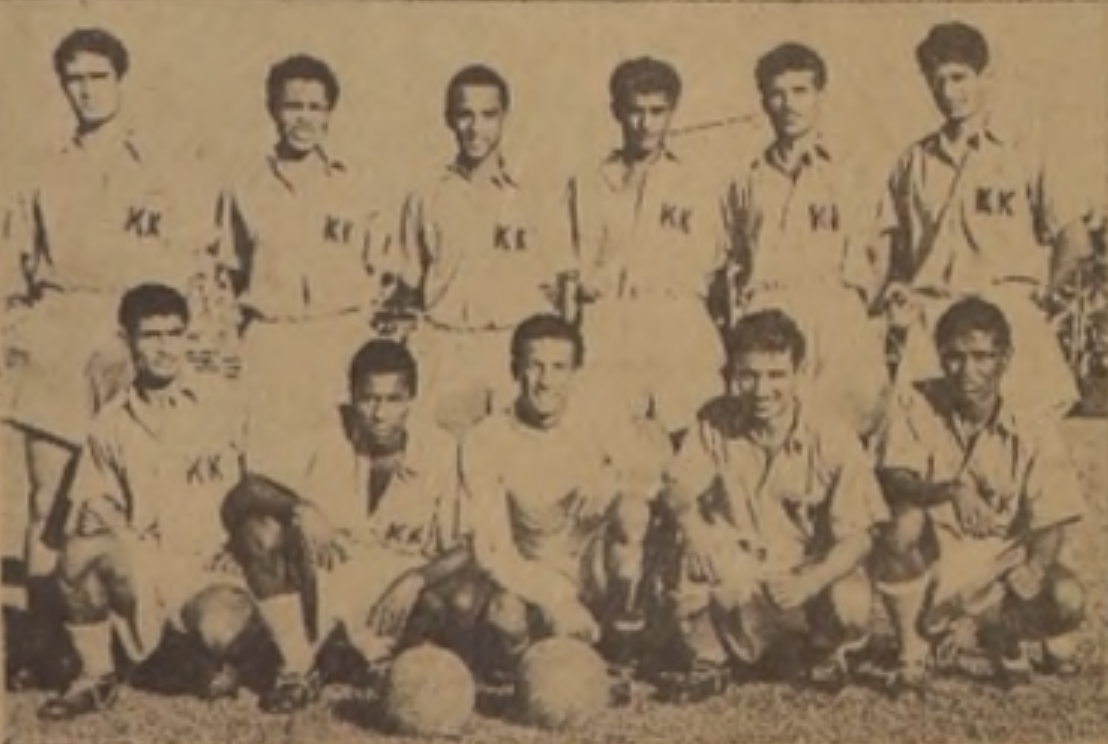
Karachi Kickers at the 1955 Sait Nagjee Football Tournament (top left), The Karachi Kickers line-up before the 1958 Aga Khan Gold Cup final (top right), and the Karachi Kickers squad pictured in 1956 (bottom).

The club participated in the Sait Nagjee Football Tournament, winning consecutively in 1955 and 1956. In 1955 under the captaincy of Dad Muhammad and a side which included Muhammad Umer, the team did a tour in south India, returning unbeaten after 32 games with 24 wins and 8 draws. Karachi Kickers also took part in various invitation tournaments including the Chakola Trophy in Ernakulam, the Nagji Memorial in Kozhikode, and the Athletic Trophy in Tellicherry in their tour. The local Indian newspapers at the time reported that Umer scored six goals in a single game in Ernakulam as well as a hattrick in Mysore.

In 1956, the team won the "Palghat Football Tournament" against the Madras Regiment Centre, with Moosa Ghazi and Ibrahim scoring in the replayed final.

Karachi Kickers starting line-up at the 1958 Aga Khan Gold Cup final against Keamari Muhammadan.

In 1958, the Karachi Kickers led by Abdul Ghafoor Majna became the first champions in the inaugural edition of the Aga Khan Gold Cup defeating their city rivals Keamari Muhammadan.

=== Later years (1970s–2000s) ===
In 1970, the Kickers club reached the semi-finals of the "All-Pakistan Nishtar Memorial Football Tournament", being defeated by Warsak FC by 0–1.

Between 2003 and 2008, the club took part in various local tournaments in Karachi, comprising 64 teams in the first, where it recorded a 0–3 defeat against Nawab XI in the 1/8 finals. The club subsequently participated in the KASB Karachi Football League in 2008.

The club made its debut in the 2008–09 PFF League, finishing third in the group A of the club leg behind Baloch Nushki and Mehran, failing to qualify for the next round to promote to the Pakistan Premier League. In the next 2009–10 PFF League, the club again failed to advance to the next round after finishing second in the group C of the club leg, behind Ravi and ahead of Hazara Zamindar. The club subsequently took part in inter-district tournaments in Karachi.

== Competitive record ==
The club's competitive records since the 2008–09 season are listed below.

Season	Div	Tms	Pos	National Challenge Cup	AFC President's Cup	AFC Cup
2008–09	PFF League	15	Group stage	DNP	DNP	DNP
2009–10	PFF League	18	Group stage	DNP	DNP	DNP

== Notable players ==
The players below had senior international cap(s) for their respective countries. Players whose name is listed, represented their countries before or after playing for Karachi Kickers.

Asia

- (India) Taj Mohammad Sr. (1955)

== Honours ==
- Sait Nagjee Football Tournament
  - Winners (2): 1955, 1956
- Aga Khan Gold Cup
  - Winners (1): 1958
