= Moosa Ghazi =

Pakistani footballer (1937 – 2003)

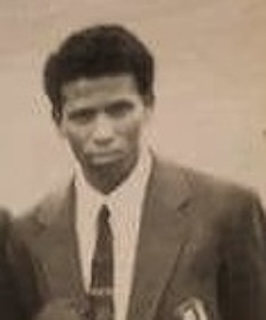
- Ghazi in 1959

Personal information
- Full name: Moosa Ghazi
- Date of birth: 1937
- Place of birth: Karachi, British India
- Date of death: 12 May 2003 (aged 65–66) (Note: Although news sources indicate Moosa died at the age of 75, he was 3 years younger than his brother Abid Ghazi.)
- Place of death: Karachi, Pakistan
- Position: Left winger

Senior career*
Years	Team	Apps	(Gls)
1952–1956	Keamari Muhammadan		
1956–1958	East Bengal		(52)
1959–1961	Kolkata Mohammedan		(50)
1961	Victoria		
1962–1968	Dhaka Mohammedan		(66+)
1969	Dilkusha		
1970	Dhaka Wanderers		

International career
1955–1967	Pakistan		

Managerial career
- Habib Bank
- * Club domestic league appearances and goals

Moosa Ghazi (Urdu: موسیٰ غازی; 1937 – 12 May 2003), alternatively spelt as Musa Ghazi, was a Pakistani footballer who played as a left winger. Moosa represented the Pakistan national football team in the 1950s to 1960s, and was member of the national squad which finished finalists at the 1962 Merdeka Tournament. Considered as one of the earliest legends in Pakistan football history, he was renowned for his performances at the wing and goalscoring abilities.

== Early life ==
Moosa hailed from the locality of Keamari in Karachi in British India. He belonged to the Makrani Baloch community (also known as Sheedi) of Sudanese descent.

== Club career ==
=== Early career ===
Moosa (second from right, standing row) with Karachi Kickers in 1956.

Moosa started playing football with Karachi club Keamari Muhammadan alongside his brother Abid Ghazi, taking part in regional tournaments with the club. He also represented representative side Karachi at the National Football Championship. At the 1955 Rovers Cup, Moosa represented Keamari Union of Karachi. Moosa also accompanied the Karachi Kickers to their second participation at the Sait Nagjee Football Tournament, scoring twice in the final.

=== Stints in India ===
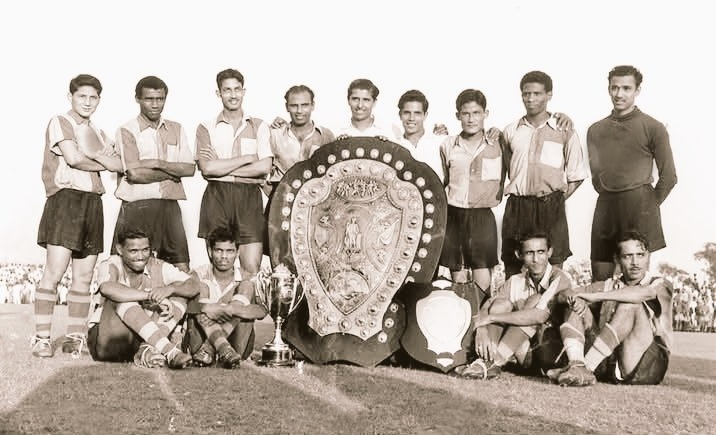
Moosa (second from left, standing row) with East Bengal in 1958.

In India, Moosa joined Calcutta League club East Bengal alongside Hussain Killer. He played for the club from 1956 to 1958. Where he scored a total of 50 goals for East Bengal Club, being their highest scorer in 1956 and 1957, netting 10 and 8 goals respectively in the Calcutta Football League during those seasons.

Notably, Moosa scored a brilliant goal which enabled East Bengal to beat Hyderabad City Police in the 1956–57 Durand Cup final, making a solo run past the defenders and scoring to make it 2–0 as East Bengal held onto the scoreline and secured their third Durand Cup title. During his tenure the club also won the DCM Trophy, with Moosa scoring in the semi-final and the final. As well as the IFA Shield in 1958. He also held the record of most goals in the DCM Trophy, with 12 goals in single competition.

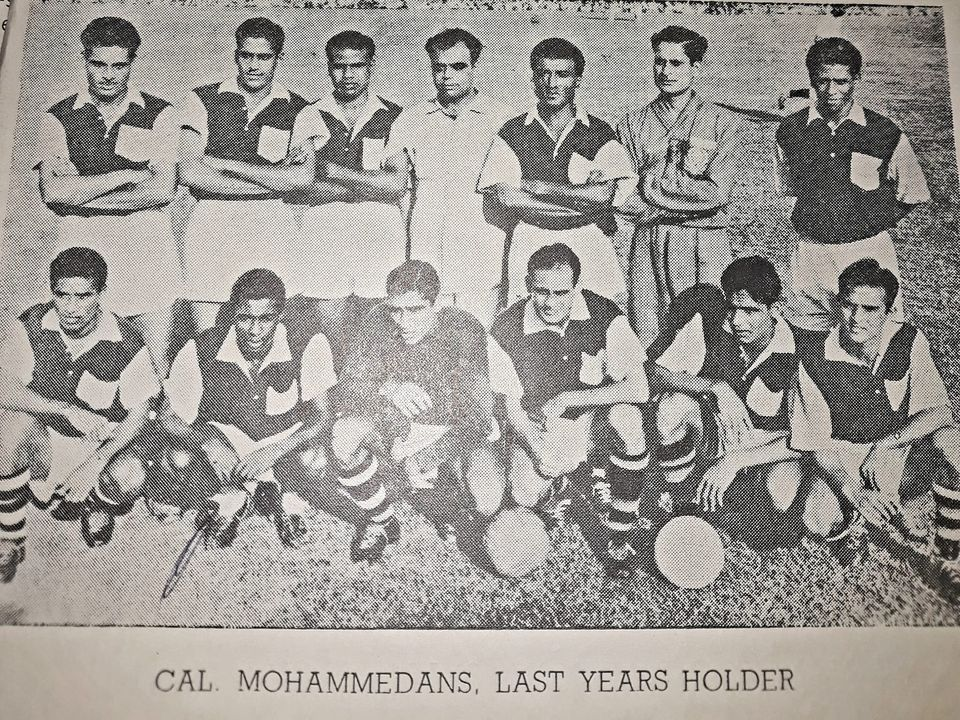
Ghazi standing at the far right with the 1960 Aga Khan Gold Cup winners Kolkata Mohammedan.

Moosa featured for Kolkata Mohammedan in the late 50s, Moosa played an integral role in his debut season with the help of his fellow national teammate Muhammad Umer, helping the team secure third in the league behind East Bengal and Mohun Bagan, with both players scoring 12 and 13 goals respectively. The same year, he helped the team win the 1959–60 Rovers Cup. Where he would go on to score a hat-trick in the final against former club East Bengal.

The following season, Moosa played a key part in the 1960 Aga Khan Gold Cup triumph over Indonesian club PSM Makassar in Dhaka, East Pakistan (now Bangladesh).

=== Victoria ===
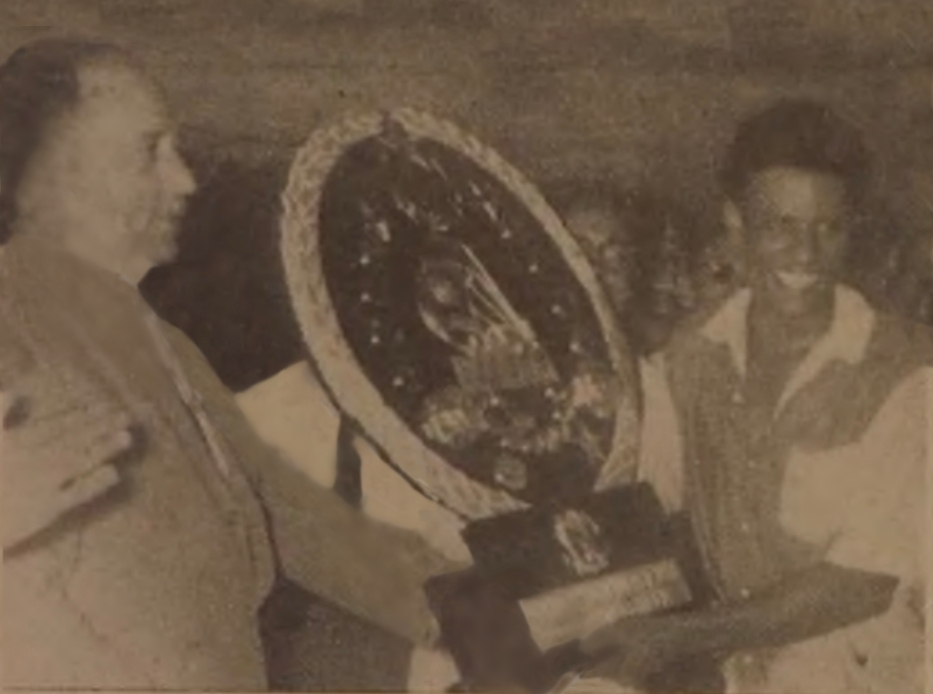
Moosa (right) with Victoria, receiving the Independence Day Football Tournament trophy.

Moosa also played for Dhaka League club Victoria SC in Dhaka 1961. He played alongside fellow Pakistan international, Muhammad Umer, helping the club finish runners-up in the Dhaka First Division League in his lone season. During his stay in the Dhaka League, he also represented Dacca Division at the National Football Championship. Notably helping them win the 1961–62 edition, scoring a hat-trick in the final.

=== Dhaka Mohammedan ===
Moosa transferred to Dhaka Mohammedan in 1962, and returned to playing alongside his brother, Abid Ghazi. During a match in the Aga Khan Gold Cup in Dhaka before 1971, when the opponent side Karachi Port Trust were leading in the match, Ghazi representing Dhaka Mohammedan, reportedly incited the fans to raid the pitch.

Moosa in action for Dhaka Mohammedan in 1966.

In 1966, he helped Mohammedan win the league title as unbeaten champions and was the league's top goal-scorer with 51 goals to his name.

=== Dilkusha SC ===
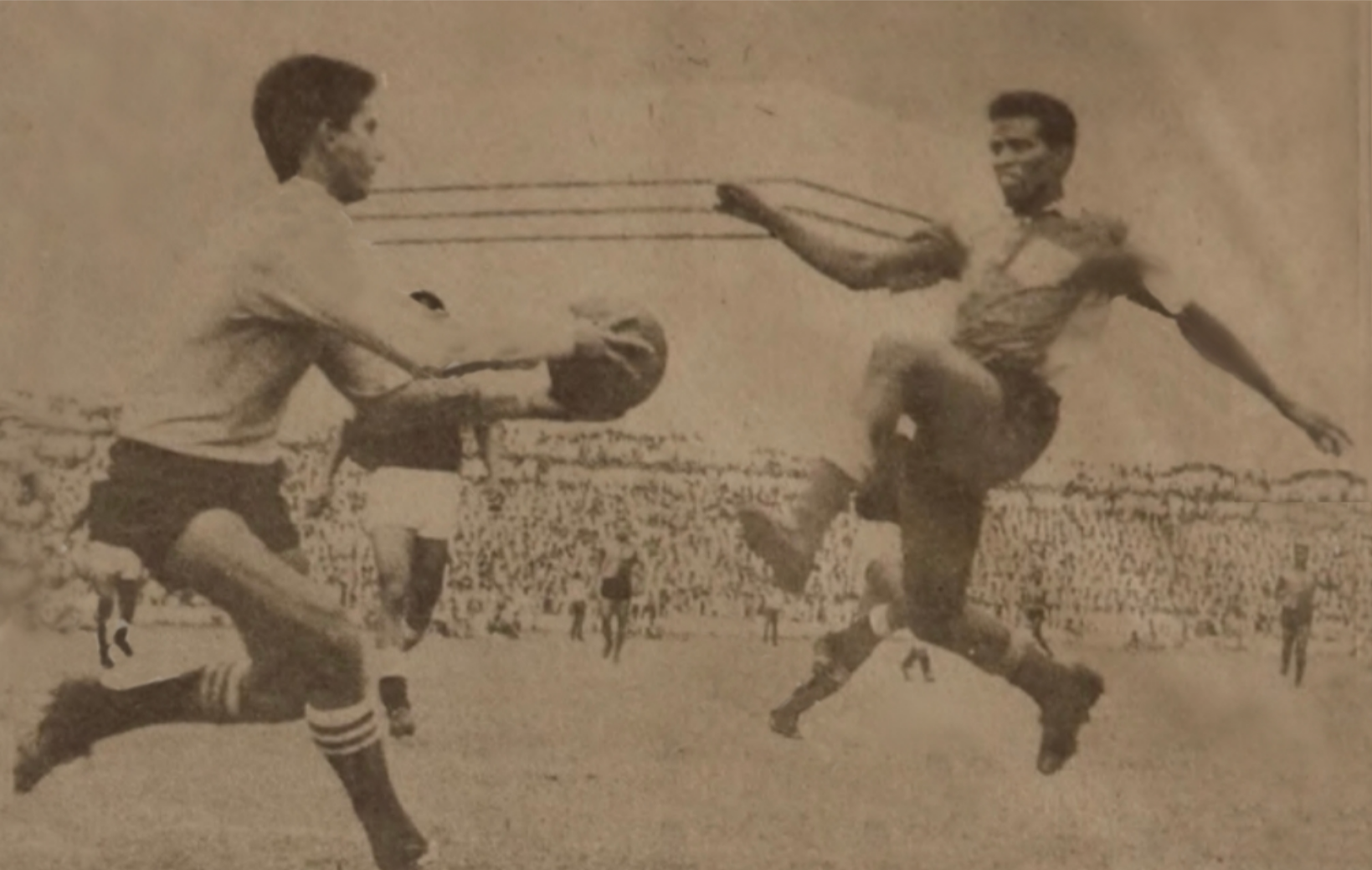
Moosa (right) with Dilkusha, during a league match against Mohammedan Sporting.

In 1969, Moosa helped newly promoted club, Dilkusha SC, finish as runners-up in the league. His teammates that season included the likes of national teammates Muhammad Umer, Qadir Bakhsh and Abdul Ghafoor.

=== Dhaka Wanderers ===
In 1970, Moosa joined Dhaka Wanderers Club and helped the club finish runners-up in the league following the withdrawal of Dhaka Mohammedan. He left for Pakistan following the Independence of Bangladesh in 1971.

== International career ==
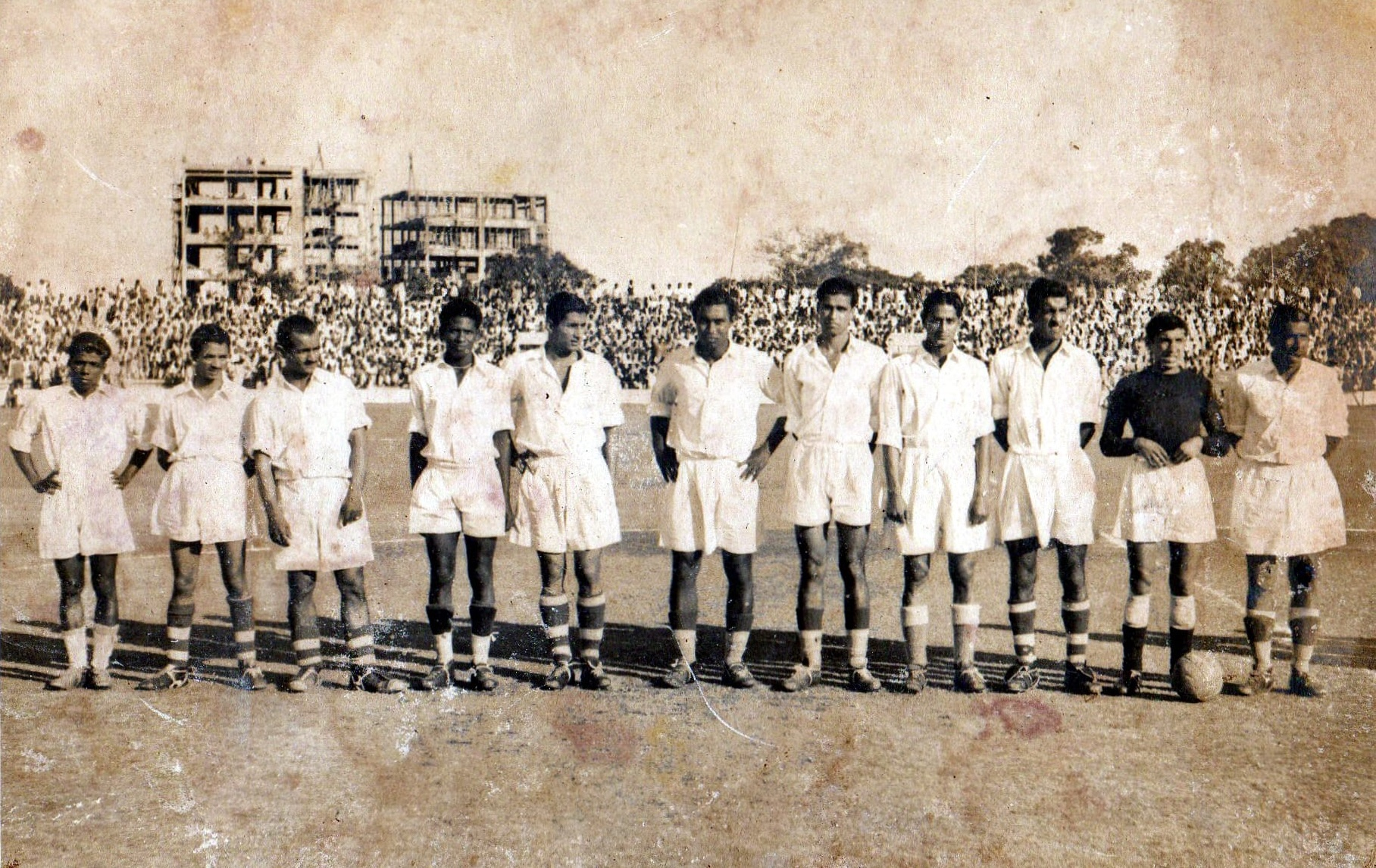
Ghazi standing fourth from left with Pakistan in 1955

Moosa was first selected by the Pakistan national team for the 1955 Asian Quadrangular Football Tournament, as a backup player for left winger Masood Fakhri. He made his debut as starter in an exhibition match against East Pakistan which resulted in a 3–1 win for Pakistan, with Moosa providing an assist for Jamil Akhtar's second goal. He also appeared in another exhibition match against India after the finalisation of the tournament, which Pakistan won 1–0.

On 5 August 1960, Moosa managed to score a hat-trick in a record 7–0 victory over Thailand at the 1960 Merdeka Tournament. After the tournament finished, Moosa was selected for the Eastern/Western Zones Combined football team for the proposed Asian All-Stars tour of Europe, which ultimately never materialised. Other Pakistan players selected for the combined team included Abid Ghazi, Qayyum Changezi, Ghulam Rabbani, and Hussain Killer.

In 1961, he captained the national team at their second match during the Burma national team tour to East Pakistan, where they played a series of friendlies.

In the next edition of the Merdeka tournament where Pakistan participated, he played a crucial role in the 1962 Merdeka Tournament scoring several goals, as Pakistan ended runner up after falling to Singapore by 1–2 in the final. He scored the first goal of the match at the 28th minute, until the reportedly less dominant opponent side managed to overcome the score. In March 1967, Moosa played a test series against Saudi Arabia scoring a hat-trick in the opening match. The series marked his final appearances for the national team.

== Coaching career ==
After retirement as player, Moosa served as head coach of the Habib Bank team. He also served as coach during the 1986 Asian Club Championship qualifying stage held at Colombo playing against Malavan, Saunders SC, and Victory SC. The team finished third out of four teams failing to qualify to the next stage.

== Personal life and death ==
After the fall of Dhaka in 1971, both Moosa and his brother Abid Ghazi were arrested by the Indian Army and made prisoners of war. According to his brother Abid, Moosa was previously offered Indian citizenship in the 1950s while playing in Calcutta but he opted to sit tight. Moosa has also been reportedly described contrasting to his calm brother, often engaging in controversies and quarreling with referees and linesmen until eventually reconciling at the finalisation of the matches.

In 2001, a beneficial football tournament was held in Moosa's name.

Moosa died on 12 May 2003, spending his final years in poverty.

== Career statistics ==
=== International goals ===
Scores and results list Pakistan's goal tally first, score column indicates score after each Moosa goal.

List of international goals scored by Moosa Ghazi
No.	Date	Venue	Opponent	Score	Result	Competition	Ref.
1	5 August 1960	Stadium Merdeka, Kuala Lumpur, Malaya	Thailand	1–0	7–0	1960 Merdeka Tournament	
2	5 August 1960	Stadium Merdeka, Kuala Lumpur, Malaya	Thailand	5–0	7–0	1960 Merdeka Tournament	
3	5 August 1960	Stadium Merdeka, Kuala Lumpur, Malaya	Thailand	6–0	7–0	1960 Merdeka Tournament	
4	18 August 1960	Singapore	South Vietnam		2–2	Friendly	
5	21 August 1960	Ikada Stadium, Jakarta, Indonesia	Indonesia		2–5	Friendly	
6	20 January 1961	Dhaka, East Pakistan	Burma		4–0	Friendly	
7	12 September 1962	Stadium Merdeka, Kuala Lumpur, Malaya	Japan	1–0	1–1	1962 Merdeka Tournament	
8	20 September 1962	Stadium Merdeka, Kuala Lumpur, Malaya	Indonesia	1–0	1–2	1962 Merdeka Tournament	
9	18 March 1967	Lyallpur Stadium, Lyallpur, Pakistan	Saudi Arabia	1–0	3–1	Friendly	
10	18 March 1967	Lyallpur Stadium, Lyallpur, Pakistan	Saudi Arabia	2–0	3–1	Friendly	
11	18 March 1967	Lyallpur Stadium, Lyallpur, Pakistan	Saudi Arabia	3–1	3–1	Friendly	

== Honours ==
Pakistan

- Merdeka Tournament
  - Runners-up (1): 1962

East Bengal

- Durand Cup:
  - Winners (1): 1956–57
- IFA Shield:
  - Winners (1): 1958
- DCM Trophy:
  - Winners (1): 1957
- Dr. H. K. Mookherjee Shield:
  - Winners (1): 1957

Kolkata Mohammedan

- Aga Khan Gold Cup:
  - Winners (1): 1960
- Calcutta Football League
  - Runners-up (1): 1960
- Durand Cup:
  - Runner-up (1): 1959
- Rovers Cup:
  - Winners (1): 1959
- DCM Trophy:
  - Winners (1): 1961
  - Runners-up (1): 1960

Victoria SC

- Dhaka First Division Football League
  - Runners-up (1): 1961
- Independence Day Football Tournament:
  - Winners (1): 1961

Dhaka Mohammedan

- Dhaka First Division Football League
  - Winners (3): 1963, 1965, 1966
- Aga Khan Gold Cup:
  - Winners (2): 1964 (shared with Karachi Port Trust), 1968
- Independence Day Tournament:
  - Winners (3): 1963, 1965, 1966
- All-Pakistan Mohammad Ali Bogra Memorial Tournament:
  - Winners (1): 1966
  - Runners-up (1): 1967

Dilkusha SC

- Dhaka First Division Football League
  - Runners-up (1): 1969

Dhaka Wanderers

- Dhaka First Division Football League
  - Runners-up (1): 1970

Dacca Division

- National Football Championship
  - Winners (1): 1961–62

Individual

- Most goals in the DCM Trophy: 12 (with East Bengal)
- Most goals in the Dhaka First Division Football League: 51 (1966, with Dhaka Mohammedan)

== See also ==
- List of Pakistan national football team captains
- List of Pakistan national football team hat-tricks
