= 1961–62 National Football Championship (Pakistan) =

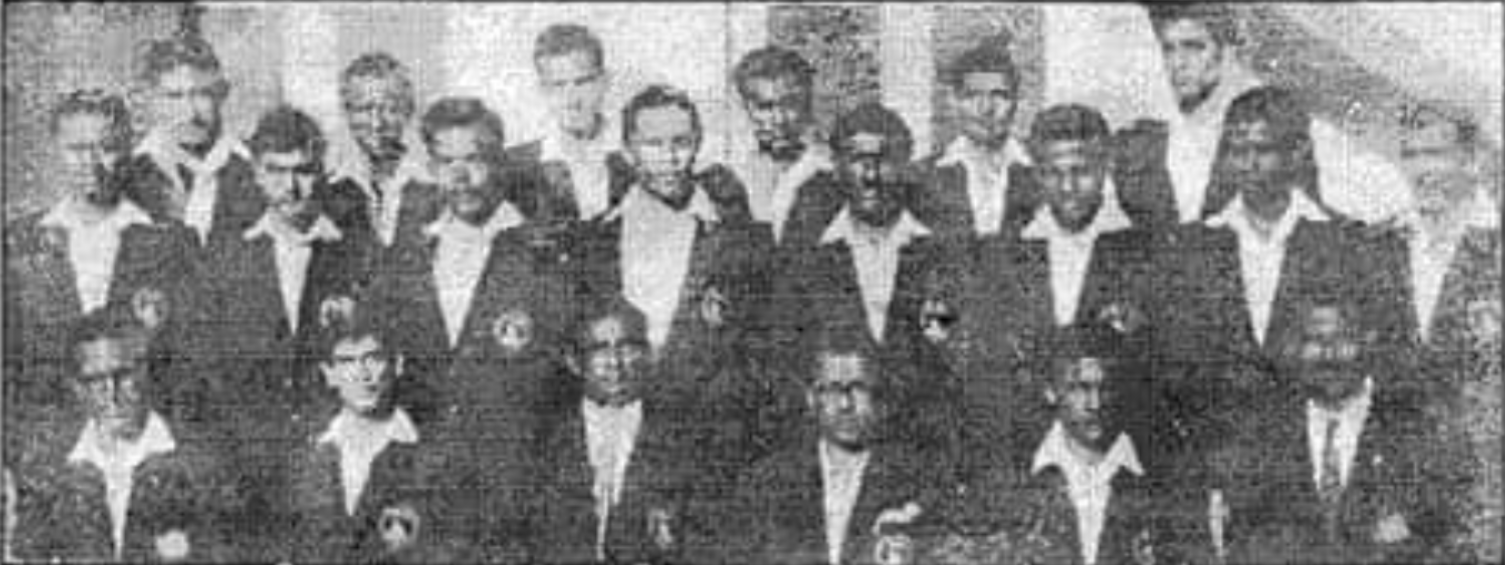
- The 1961–62 National Football Championship winners, Dacca Division team pictured.

Tournament details
- Country: Pakistan
- Venue: Railway Stadium
- Dates: 20 December 1961 – 12 January 1962
- Teams: 23

Final positions
- Champions: Dacca Division
- Runners-up: Karachi Blues

The 1961–62 National Football Championship was the 12th edition of the National Football Championship, the tournament was held from 20 December till 12 January 1962 at the Railway Stadium (Karachi). This was also the first edition of the championship where the structure of the tournament transitioned from provincial to divisional based teams.

== Venue ==
Location	Name	Capacity	Image	Notes
Karachi	Railway Stadium	n/a		

== First round ==
20 December 1961

Pakistan Air Force	6–1	Bahawalpur Division
Faqir; Munir; Majeed; Atique	Report	Mohammad Bakhsh

Railway Stadium, Karachi, Pakistan

21 December 1961

Hyderabad Division	3–1	Pakistan Navy
Ata Mohammad 13' (pen.); Ali 33'; Nisar 88'	Report	Sarkar 72'

Railway Stadium, Karachi, Pakistan
Referee: Afzal Khan

22 December 1961

Pakistan Railways	3–1	Sargodha Division
Ashiq 4', 88'; Talib 22'	Report	Akram

Railway Stadium, Karachi, Pakistan
Referee: Captain Malik Muhammad Husain

24 December 1961

Pakistan Army	6–0	Khairpur Division
Khair 16'; Rehman 22', 52'; Mohabat 51'; Jalil 54'

Railway Stadium, Karachi, Pakistan

The Karachi Whites and Kalat Division match report has not currently been found, however, Karachi Whites managed to advance to the next round.

== Second round ==
26 December 1961

Pakistan Army	5–1	Rawalpindi Division
Sikander Ali 13'; Rehman 34', 35', 49'	Report	Nawazish (o.g.); Sherdad 75'

Railway Stadium, Karachi, Pakistan
Referee: Ghulam Hussain

27 December 1961

Pakistan Air Force	5–1	Rajshahi Division
Faqir 22'; Mahmood 35' (o.g.); Majeed 52'	Report	Fazlul Karim 5'

Railway Stadium, Karachi, Pakistan
Referee: Bahadur Khan

29 December 1961

Karachi Whites	2–0	Multan Division
Fakir Mohammad 20'; Abdul Majid 70'	Report

Railway Stadium, Karachi, Pakistan

30 December 1961

Quetta Division	2–1	Hyderabad Division
Aslam 55', 57'	Report	Ata Mohammad 25'

Railway Stadium, Karachi, Pakistan

=== Second replay ===
30 December 1961

Peshawar Division	1–0	West Pakistan Universities
Kasim 3'

Railway Stadium, Karachi, Pakistan

31 December 1961

Karachi Blues	6–0	Chittagong Division
Mahmood 26'; Taqi 36'	Report

Railway Stadium, Karachi, Pakistan

1 January 1962

Lahore Division	4–1	Khulna Division
Saleem 62', 83'; Arshad 43'; Jawaid 71'	Report	Kabir 44'

Railway Stadium, Karachi, Pakistan
Referee: Omar

2 January 1962

Dacca Division	1–1	Pakistan Railways
Umer 59'	Report	Jehan 18'

Railway Stadium, Karachi, Pakistan
Attendance: 6,000
Referee: Captain Malik Muhammad Husain

== Quarter-finals ==
3 January 1962

Lahore Division	1–1	Karachi Blues
Jawaid 20'	Report	Ismail 28'

Railway Stadium, Karachi, Pakistan
Referee: Ghulam Hussain

=== Replay ===
4 January 1962

Karachi Blues	3–0	Lahore Division
Faqir Mohammad 18', 26'; Kasim 20'	Report

Railway Stadium, Karachi, Pakistan

4 January 1962

Peshawar Division	2–1	Pakistan Air Force
Sarfraz 30'; Alamgir 47'	Report	Mustafa 24'

Railway Stadium, Karachi, Pakistan
Referee: Ghulam Hussain

5 January 1962

Dacca Division	7–1	Pakistan Railways
Umer 69', 71', 72'; Moosa 43', 53'; Ghafoor 7' (pen.), 12' (pen.)	Report	Talib 57'

Railway Stadium, Karachi, Pakistan
Attendance: 10,000
Referee: Captain Malik Muhammad Husain

6 January 1962

Karachi Blues	1–0	Quetta Division
Majid 42'	Report

Railway Stadium, Karachi, Pakistan
Referee: Ghulam Hussain

7 January 1962

Dacca Division	2–0	Pakistan Army
Moosa 42', 90'	Report

Railway Stadium, Karachi, Pakistan
Referee: Siddiqi

== Semi-finals ==
8 January 1962

Karachi Blues	1–1	Peshawar Division
Taqi 37'	Report	Jehangir 35'

Railway Stadium, Karachi, Pakistan

=== Replay ===
9 January 1962

Karachi Blues	3–1	Peshawar Division
Taqi 14', 56'; Nazar	Report	Samiuddin 15'

Railway Stadium, Karachi, Pakistan
Referee: Captain Malik Muhammad Husain

9 January 1962

Dacca Division	1–1	Karachi Whites
Abdullah 89'	Report	Murad 87'

Railway Stadium, Karachi, Pakistan
Referee: Siddiqi

=== Replay ===
11 January 1962

Dacca Division	7–1	Karachi Whites
Umer 8', 48', 65'; Moosa; Abdullah 21'; Ghafoor 90'	Report	Kasim 67'

Railway Stadium, Karachi, Pakistan
Referee: Siddiqi

== Final ==
=== Match ===
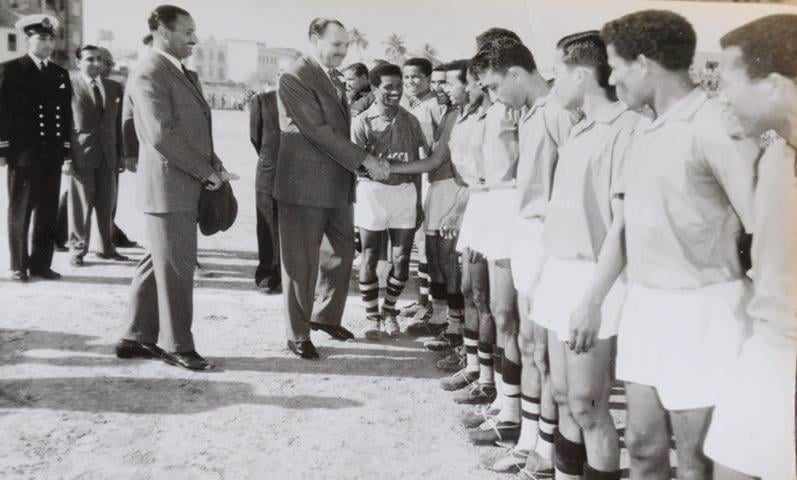
Abid Hussain Ghazi, presenting the Dacca Division team to Ayub Khan and Asghar Khan, before the final.

The 1961–62 National Football Championship final took place on 12 January 1962. The final was between Dacca Division, and Karachi Blues, the final was witnessed by president Ayub Khan, Asghar Khan, divisional commissioner Mr. G. A. Madani, Commissioner Syed Munir Husain, and other civil and military officers.

The match began at fast pace, with the ball being exchanged by both sides for several minutes. It was up until the 35th minute that both teams were both drawn at 0–0, Ghulam Rabbani, Dacca's right winger, would then proceed to open the scoring through a corner-kick initiated by Moosa Ghazi. Three minutes later, Moosa would find the net by a pass from teammate Abdullah Rahi.

After resumption, the game continued on a competitive pace, however, Moosa would again find the back of the net in the 53rd minute through a solo goal. After several brief chances at the goalposts from both sides, Ismail Roshu, Karachi's pivot, passed back to Nisar Ahmed, failing to recognise the pass, it would roll into the back of the net, giving Dacca Division a lead of 4–1. In the 65th minute of the game, a combination of passes initiated between Moosa Ghazi and Muhammad Umer, put Moosa through on goal, with the latter securing his hat-trick. The next goal came in the 82nd minute, as Umer would fire a shot into the net from a pass by Yousuf Jr.. The opposition would manage to reduce the margin to 6–1 through their forward, Taqi.

Final
12 January 1962
20:00

Dacca Division	6–1	Karachi Blues
Rabbani 35'; Moosa 38', 53', 65'; Ismail Roshu (o.g.); Umer 82'	Report	Taqi 84'

Railway Stadium, Karachi, Pakistan
Attendance: 10,000
Referee: Captain Malik Muhammad Husain

=== Line-ups ===
- Dacca Division: Ali Mohammad, Khuda Bakhsh, Debinash Sangma, Hussain Killer, Abid Hussain Ghazi (Captain), Abdul Ghafoor, Ghulam Rabbani, Yousuf Jr., Muhammad Umer, Abdullah Rahi, Moosa Ghazi.
- Karachi Blues: Nisar Ahmed, Saleh Mohammad, Turab Ali, Nazar, Ismail, Ismail Roshu, Mirdad, Mahmood Jr., Mahmood Sr., Taqi, Abdul Majid.

== Statistics ==
=== 9 goals ===
- Moosa Ghazi (Dacca Division)

=== 8 goals ===
- Muhammad Umer (Dacca Division)

=== 5 goals ===
- Muhammad Taqi (Karachi Blues)

=== 3 goals ===
- Abdul Ghafoor (Dacca Division)
