= 1960 National Football Championship (Pakistan) =

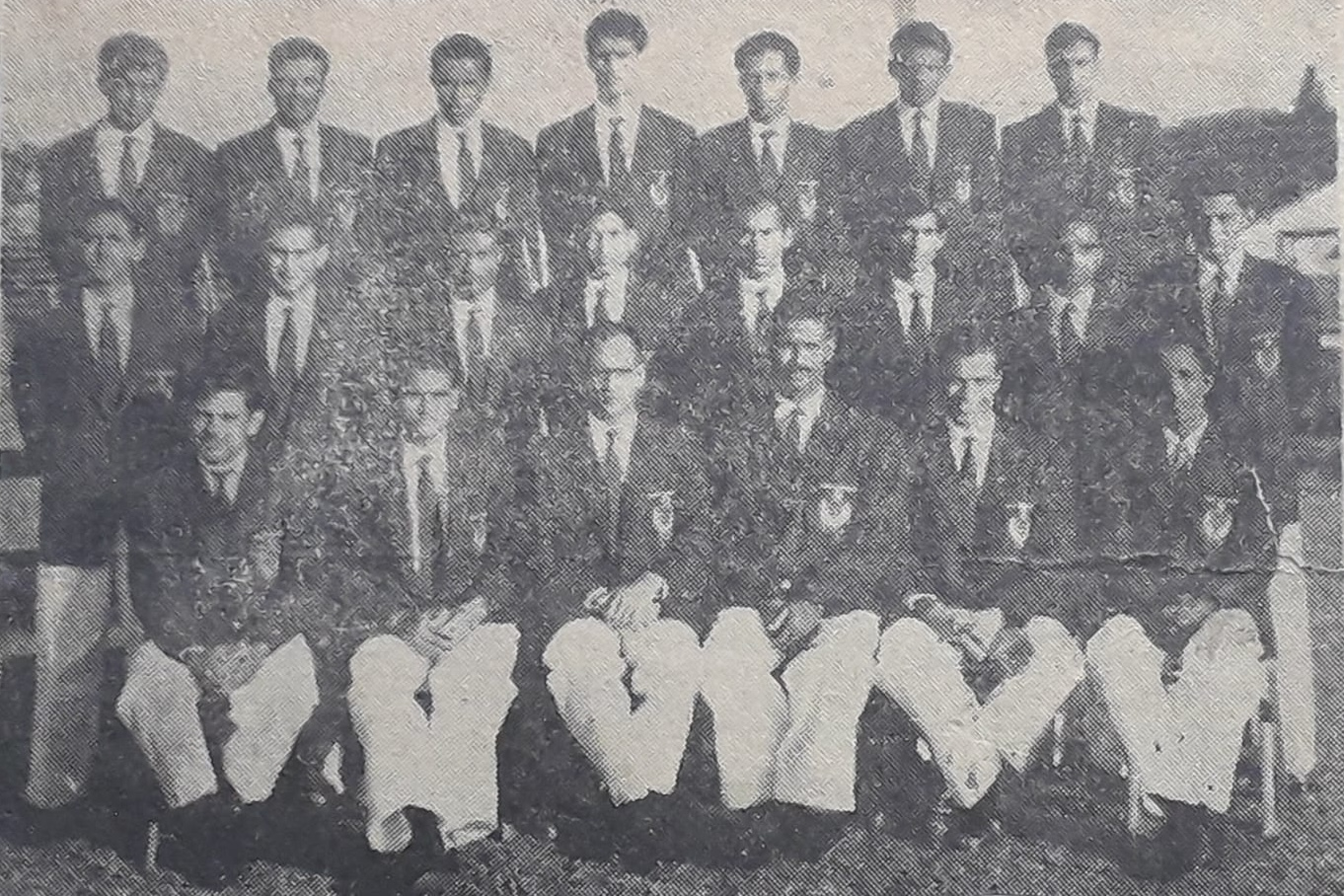
- The East Pakistan football team which won the 1960 National Football Championship.

Tournament details
- Country: Pakistan
- Dates: 6 November 1960 – 27 November 1960

Final positions
- Champions: East Pakistan
- Runners-up: Karachi Whites

Tournament statistics
- Top goal scorer: (Pakistan) Yaqub (7 goals)

The 1960 National Football Championship was the 11th edition of the National Football Championship, the competition was held from 6 November 1960 till 27 November 1960, at the Railway Stadium.

== Elimination round ==
6 November 1960

Karachi Whites	7–0	Hyderabad Division
Mahmood 15' 67'; Abbas 11', 61', 68'; Haroon	Report

Railway Stadium, Karachi, Pakistan
Attendance: 5,000
Referee: Bahadur Khan

7 November 1960

Pakistan Railways	1–1	Pakistan Air Force
Shanker 30'	Report	Faqir

Railway Stadium, Karachi, Pakistan
Referee: Sardar Ali Dara

8 November 1960

NWFP	6–0	Bahawalpur Division
Jehangir 5', 33', 69', 75', 76'; Aurangzeb	Report

Railway Stadium, Karachi, Pakistan

9 November 1960

Punjab Blues	3–3	Pakistan Navy
Aziz Malik 4', 47'; Jehan 74'		Rahim 11', 52'; Taj 45'

Railway Stadium, Karachi, Pakistan
Referee: Captain Malik Muhammad Hussain

10 November 1960

Pakistan Army	2–1	Punjab Reds
Manzoor 40' (pen.); Sikander 85'	Report	Haider Jan 10' (o.g.)

Railway Stadium, Karachi, Pakistan
Referee: Umer

=== Replay ===
11 November 1960

Pakistan Railways	1–0	Pakistan Air Force
Shanker 5'	Report

Railway Stadium, Karachi, Pakistan
Referee: Nabi Bakhsh

=== Replay ===
13 November 1960

Punjab Blues	3–1	Pakistan Navy
Sher Mohammad 52', 88'; Khalid Butt 61'		? 18'

Railway Stadium, Karachi, Pakistan
Referee: Captain Malik Muhammad Hussain

== Group stage ==
=== Group 1 ===
Pos	Team	Pld	W	D	L	GF	GA	GD	Pts
1	Karachi Whites	3	2	1	0	11	3	+8	5
2	Punjab	3	2	0	1	10	8	+2	4
3	NWFP	3	1	0	2	3	11	−8	2
4	Baluchistan Blues	3	0	2	1	5	6	−1	2

13 November 1960

Karachi Whites	5–0	NWFP
Mahmood 8', 12', 25'; Abbas 35'; Haroon 66'

Railway Stadium, Karachi, Pakistan
Attendance: 8,000
Referee: Rafatullah

15 November 1960

Punjab Blues	5–1	NWFP
Khalid Butt; Jehan; Aziz Malik	Report	Jehangir

Railway Stadium, Karachi, Pakistan
Referee: Maula Dad

17 November 1960

NWFP	2–1	Baluchistan Blues
Sarfraz 75', 85'	Report	Sultan Jan

Railway Stadium, Karachi, Pakistan
Referee: Afzal Khan

18 November 1960

Karachi Whites	5–2	Punjab Blues
Mahmood 27'; Abbas 50'; Yousuf Sr. 52'; Niamat 58' (o.g.)	Report	Jehan

Railway Stadium, Karachi, Pakistan
Attendance: 5,000
Referee: Bahadur Khan

20 November 1960

Karachi Whites	1–1	Baluchistan Blues
Mahmood 77'	Report	Ghulam Hussain 18'

Railway Stadium, Karachi, Pakistan
Attendance: 10,000
Referee: Rafatullah

22 November 1960

Punjab Blues	3–3	Baluchistan Blues
Jehan 34', 71'; Khalid Butt	Report	Ghulam Hussain 25'; Qayyum 89'

Railway Stadium, Karachi, Pakistan
Referee: Umer Din

=== Group 2 ===
Pos	Team	Pld	W	D	L	GF	GA	GD	Pts
1	East Pakistan	3	2	1	0	9	2	+7	5
2	Pakistan Railways	3	2	0	1	4	7	−3	4
3	Pakistan Army	3	0	1	2	3	5	−2	1
4	Karachi Greens	3	1	0	2	4	6	−2	2

12 November 1960

East Pakistan	3–1	Karachi Greens
Yaqub 52' 57'	Report	Lal Mohammad 35'

Railway Stadium, Karachi, Pakistan
Referee: Fazal Akbar

13 November 1960

Pakistan Railways	2–1	Pakistan Army
Shanker 17'; Yaqoob 25'	Report	Jalil 5'

Railway Stadium, Karachi, Pakistan
Referee: Nabi Bakhsh

16 November 1960

East Pakistan	5–0	Pakistan Railways
Moosa Jr. 15'; Yaqub 30', 47'; Haq 54' (o.g.); Rabbani

Railway Stadium, Karachi, Pakistan
Referee: Sardar Ali Dara

19 November 1960

East Pakistan	1–1	Pakistan Army
Abdullah 72'	Report	Mamoor 84'

Railway Stadium, Karachi, Pakistan
Referee: Fazal Akbar

21 November 1960

Pakistan Railways	2–1	Karachi Greens
Shanker 40', 42'		Qasim 72'

Railway Stadium, Karachi, Pakistan
Referee: Sardar Ali Dara

23 November 1960

Karachi Greens	2–1	Pakistan Army
Yousuf Jr. 57', 80'	Report	Mamoor 84'

Railway Stadium, Karachi, Pakistan
Referee: Y. A. Siddiqi

== Semi-finals ==
24 November 1960

East Pakistan	3–0	Punjab Blues
Yaqub 55', 73'; Rabbani 60'

Railway Stadium, Karachi, Pakistan
Referee: Bahadur Khan

25 November 1960

Karachi Whites	1–1	Pakistan Railways
Ismail Roshu 86' (pen.)		Asif 28' (pen.)

Railway Stadium, Karachi, Pakistan
Referee: Muhammad Malik Husain

=== Replay ===
26 November 1960

Karachi Whites	6–2	Pakistan Railways
Abbas; Haroon		Yaqoob 24'

Railway Stadium, Karachi, Pakistan
Referee: Y. A. Siddiqi

== Final ==
=== Match ===
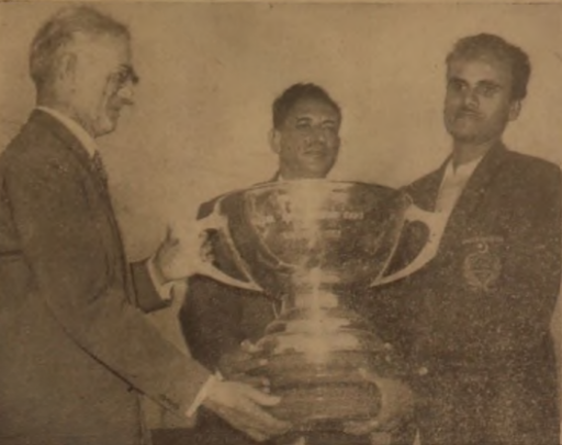
East Pakistan captain Zahirul Haque receiving the National Championship trophy from F.M. Khan.

The 1960 National Football Championship final took place on 27 November 1960. The final match was between East Pakistan and Karachi Whites, with 15,000-20,000 spectators filling the Railway Stadium.

The match would begin with East Pakistan dominating most of the possession, several corner-kicks were also initiated however, neither side found the net during the first-half. In the second-half, both teams started to launch aggressive attacks at both ends, it wasn't until the 75th minute where Moosa Jr. got the ball on the right flank, and finished the shot into the back of the net giving East Pakistan a 1–0 lead over their opponents. After two important chances from Ghulam Rabbani were wasted, East Pakistan would become National Champions, successfully avenging their loss from the 1959 championship.

27 November 1960

East Pakistan	1–0	Karachi Whites
Moosa Jr. 75'

Railway Stadium, Karachi, Pakistan
Attendance: 20,000
Referee: Bahadur Khan

=== Teams ===
- East Pakistan: Muhammad Siddiq, Zahir (captain), Saifuddin Ahmed, Rasool Bakhsh, Gafur Baloch, MA Samad, Bashir Ahmed, Moosa Jr., Yaqub, Abdullah, Rabbani.
- Karachi Whites: Ghulam Hussain, Khuda Bakhsh, Turab Ali, Ismail Roshu, Ismail Sr., Mirdad, Taqi, Mahmood, Yousuf Sr.

Following the conclusion of the championship, it was restricted to divisional teams, from the 1961–62 edition onwards, the EPSF introduced teams from Dacca, Chittagong, Khulna, and Rajshahi, marking the end of the provincial team's participation in the tournament.

== Statistics ==
=== 7 goals ===
- Muhammad Yaqub (East Pakistan)

=== 6 goals ===
- (Pakistan) Ghulam Abbas Baloch (Karachi Whites)
- (Pakistan) M.N. Jehan (Punjab Blues)

=== 5 goals ===
- (Pakistan) Mahmood (Karachi Whites)
