= Pratap Shankar Hazra =

Bangladeshi former footballer and field hockey player

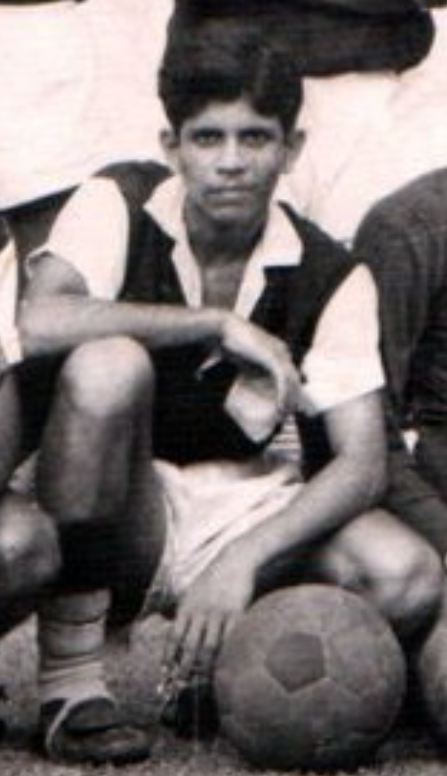
- Pratap with Dhaka Mohammedan in 1963
- Born: 3 April 1943 (age 83); Munshiganj, Bengal, British India (present-day Bangladesh)
- Height: 1.73 m (5 ft 8 in)
Association football career
- Position: Left winger
Senior career*
| Years | Team | Apps | (Gls) |
| 1961–1962 | Victoria SC | | |
| 1963–1977 | Mohammedan SC | | |
International career
| 1963–1969 | East Pakistan | | |
| 1965 | Pakistan Youth | | |
| 1964–1967 | Pakistan | | |
| 1971 | Shadhin Bangla | | |
| 1973 | Bangladesh | | |
Managerial career
- 1981–1982: East End Club
- 1987: Mohammedan SC
- * Club domestic league appearances and goals
- Field hockey career
- Sport: Field hockey
- Position: Forward
Senior career
| Years | Team | Caps | Goals |
| 1957–1959 | Wari Club | - | - |
| 1960–1962 | Victoria SC | - | - |
| 1963–1971 | Combined SC | - | - |
| 1972–1973 | Mohammedan SC | - | - |
| 1974–1976 | Dhaka Abahani | - | - |
| 1977–1982 | Mohammedan SC | - | - |
National team
| Years | Team | Caps | Goals |
| 1961–1970 | East Pakistan Youth | ?? | (??) |
| 1978 | Bangladesh | 1 | (0) |
Coaching career
- 1982–1984: Mohammedan SC
- 1984: Bangladesh U18
- 1989–1997: Mohammedan SC
- 1995: Bangladesh
- 1996: Bangladesh U18

Pratap Shankar Hazra (Bengali: প্রতাপ শংকর হাজরা; born 3 April 1943) is a former Bangladeshi national football and hockey player and coach. He is a former national coach of Bangladesh.

== Early life ==
Pratap was born on 3 April 1943 in Sreenagar Upazila of Munshiganj District in Bengal, British India, the son of Priyo Shankar and Annapurna Hazra. He spent most of his childhood living in Armanitola, Dacca. He passed matriculation from Armanitola High School in 1960 and gained admission to Jagannath College. Pratap passed his higher secondary in 1964 and was admitted to Dacca University, where he majored in Bachelor of Arts.

== Club career ==
=== Football ===
Pratap began playing inter-college football in 1961, representing Jagannath College, and eventually joined Victoria SC in the Dhaka First Division League in the same year. In his second year at the club, he won the league title along with the Aga Khan Gold Cup, and Independence Day Football Tournament. Nonetheless, he rarely entered the pitch in a Victoria team dominated by Makrani players from the Pakistan national team.

In 1963, Pratap joined Mohammedan SC, where he served until his retirement in 1977. Playing as a left-winger, Pratap won the First Division six times, the Aga Khan Gold Cup and Independence Day Cup twice. He notably scored from a direct corner against Karachi Port Trust in the 1964 Aga Khan Gold Cup final, as both teams shared the trophy after a 1–1 draw. He was also part of the Mohammedan team that were unbeaten league champions in 1969, with his attacking partnership with Ali Nawaz Baloch, Abdullah Rahi and Golam Sarwar Tipu being integral to their success.

In the National Football Championship, Pratap became a champion with Dhaka Division in 1962. He represented the Dacca Division junior team in the National Youth Football Championship in 1963, and the following year, he played for Dacca District in the inter-district football championship. Pratap also won the inter-university football championship with Dacca University in both 1966 and 1968. Additionally, he represented Dacca Division in the 1968 National Championship held in Jessore. In the 1969 edition of the National Championship, he represented East Zone winners, East Pakistan Combined University, in the main tournament held in Lahore.

=== Hockey ===
Pratap also participated in the Dhaka First Division Hockey League, starting his career with Wari Club in 1957. He founded Combined Sporting Club in Old Dhaka in 1963, after spending three years at both Wari and Victoria SC. He served both as an organizer and a player at the club, and helped them win the First Division League three times while also clinching a runner-up position in the Atiqullah Cup. He represented the club until the Independence of Bangladesh, after which, he served both Mohammedan and Dhaka Abahani, winning the league title twice at each club. He was also Mohammedan's player-cum-coach during its 1982 league triumph.

== International career ==
=== Football ===
==== East Pakistan football team ====
In 1963, Pratap represented East Pakistan in an exhibition match against the China national team. His team suffered a 1–11 defeat. In the same year, when Bundesliga club Fortuna Düsseldorf toured Pakistan for exhibition matches, Pratap was included in the East Pakistan Sports Federation XI squad. He remained an unused substitute during their exhibition match in Dacca. The team was led by Pakistan national team captain Qayyum Changezi. On 16 August 1969, he featured in the second exhibition match for East Pakistan XI against Yangzee FC from South Korea held in Dhaka. The game ended in a 2–3 defeat for the home team.

==== Pakistan football team ====
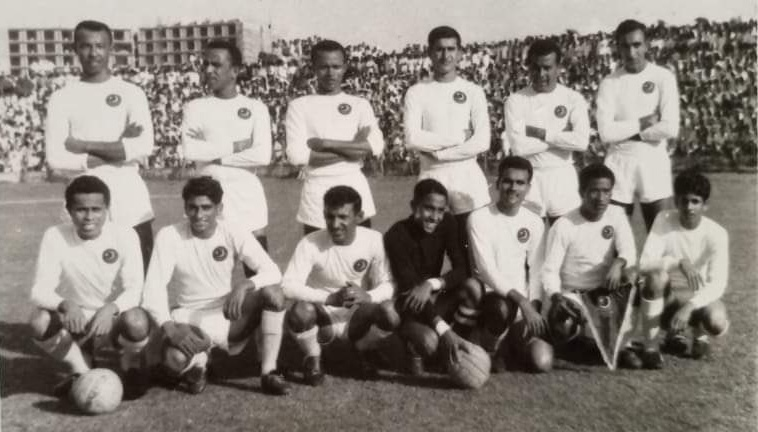
Pakistan national team in 1964, Pratap sitting at far right

In 1964, he made his Pakistan national team debut, featuring in three exhibition games against Neftyanik from Baku, Soviet Union. Other East Pakistani players in the team included Zahirul Haque and Balai Dey. On 28 February 1965, he represented Pakistan against Ceylon in an exhibition match held in Colombo, which ended in a 1–3 defeat. That same year, he was appointed vice-captain of the Pakistan Youth Team during their tour of the Soviet Union. During the 1965 RCD Cup, he provided an assist to fellow left inside forward Muhammad Saleem to score the consolation goal for Pakistan in a 1–3 defeat against Turkey. In March 1967, he was part of the national team which played four exhibition games against Saudi Arabia, where he replaced Ayub Dar in the starting eleven. Pratap was also included in the national team for the 1967 RCD Cup held in Dacca, East Pakistan. During the tournament, Pakistan suffered 2–0 and 7–4 defeats at the hands of Iran and Turkey, respectively.

==== Shadhin Bangla football team ====
During the Bangladesh Liberation War, the Pakistan Army burned down Pratap's house in Armanitola on the night of 26 March 1971 because he and his family were Hindus. Pratap's family, fled their one-story house and sought refuge in the graveyard of a nearby Armenian Church to save their lives. As a player for Combined Sporting Club, a now-defunct club in Old Dhaka, two of Pratap's teammates took him to their house in Dhanmondi, where they stayed for two days before crossing the Buriganga River to find shelter in Jinjira. They eventually moved to their village in Sreenagar, Munshiganj, where they stayed for a month.

Later, he fled to Kolkata to join the Mukti Bahini under Hafizuddin Ahmed but was told he wasn't eligible for service by Tawfiq-e-Elahi Chowdhury. While in Kolkata, he met Ali Imam, another Dhaka First Division footballer. In June 1971, Shamsul Haque Chowdhury, a Bangladeshi politician, requested footballers to form a national team on behalf of the Bangladeshi government in exile. Pratap and Imam traveled to Agartala to gather players for the Shadhin Bangla football team. The team aimed to convince Indian Muslims, who believed the trouble was caused by Hindu infiltrators, to support the liberation of Bangladesh.

Initially, the team going by Joy Bangla XI played an exhibition game against Tripura XI on 2 July 1971 in Tripura. The Shadhin Bangla team played their first official match on 25 July 1971 against Nadia XI in Nadia district, with Pratap serving as vice-captain under captain Zakaria Pintoo, based on seniority.

==== Bangladesh football team ====
In 1972, Pratap represented Dhaka XI (the unofficial Bangladesh national football team) at the Bordoloi Trophy in Guwahati, India. His team finished as runners-up, losing 1–5 to East Bengal Club in the final. The following year, coach Sheikh Shaheb Ali included Pratap in the first official Bangladesh national team. Similar to his role in the Shadhin Bangla football team, Pratap was made vice-captain, while Zakaria Pintoo captained the team for the 1973 Merdeka Cup. Pratap made his debut on 27 July 1973, in a 2–2 draw against Thailand. He played 70 minutes in his debut before being substituted for AKM Nowsheruzzaman.

=== Hockey ===
==== East Pakistan hockey team ====
Pratap represented the East Pakistan hockey team in the Pakistan National Hockey Championship from 1961 to 1970. He was called up to the Pakistan national field hockey team training camp in both 1965 and 1968. He featured for East Pakistan in numerous exhibition matches against teams like Japan and New Zealand. In a match against Malaysia, he contributed to a 2–1 victory.

In 1970, he represented East Pakistan in an exhibition match against the Pakistan national team, which had won gold at the 1970 Asian Games. Pratap played in his usual inside-left position, but East Pakistan suffered a 0–1 defeat in that game.

==== Bangladesh hockey team ====
Pratap's only appearance for the Bangladesh national field hockey team came against the visiting Sri Lanka national field hockey team in 1978.

== Coaching career ==
Pratap coached the Mohammedan SC field hockey team from 1982 to 1984 and again from 1989 to 1997, during which he won the First Division Hockey League five times. He was appointed coach of Bangladesh's junior hockey team for the 1984 IIHF Asian Oceanic Junior U18 Championship qualifiers. Pratap also coached the Bangladesh national field hockey team, which won bronze at the 1995 South Asian Games held in Madras, India. In 1996, he coached the junior team at the Men's Hockey Junior Asia Cup in Singapore, where Bangladesh finished sixth. In the same year, he was named Coach of the year by the Bangladesh Hockey Federation.

In 1987, Pratap served as the head football coach of Mohammedan SC and led the club to the Federation Cup title, defeating arch-rivals Dhaka Wanderers 1–0 in the final. His role was taken over by Nasser Hejazi before the start of the Dhaka League. Prior to that, he coached East End Club in 1981 when the club was relegated to the Second Division. Nonetheless, he remained in the post the following season.

== Career statistics ==
=== International goals ===
Scores and results list Pakistan's goal tally first, score column indicates score after each Pratap goal.

List of international goals scored by Pratap Shankar Hazra
| No. | Date | Venue | Opponent | Score | Result | Competition | Ref. |
|---|---|---|---|---|---|---|---|
| 1 | 25 March 1967 | Niaz Stadium, Hyderabad, Pakistan | Saudi Arabia | 1–0 | 2–2 | Friendly | |

== Honours ==
=== Football player ===
Victoria SC

- Dhaka First Division League: 1962
- Aga Khan Gold Cup: 1962
- Independence Day Football Tournament: 1962

Mohammedan

- Dhaka First Division League: 1963, 1965, 1966, 1969, 1975, 1976
- Aga Khan Gold Cup: 1964*, 1968
- Independence Day Football Tournament: 1963, 1966
- All-Pakistan Mohammad Ali Bogra Memorial Tournament: 1966

Dhaka Division

- National Football Championship: 1962

=== Football coach ===
Mohammedan SC

- Federation Cup: 1987

=== Hockey player ===
Dhaka Abahani

- First Division Hockey League: 1975, 1976

Mohammedan SC

- First Division Hockey League: 1979, 1980

=== Hockey coach ===
Mohammedan SC

- First Division Hockey League: 1982, 1990, 1992, 1995, 1997

=== Individual ===
- 2001 − National Sports Award
- 2018 − Rupchada Prothom Alo Award 2018

== See also ==
- List of association footballers who have been capped for two senior national teams

== Bibliography ==
- Mahmud, Dulal (2020). খেলার মাঠে মুক্তিযুদ্ধ [Liberation war in the playground] (in Bengali). Bishhoshahitto Bhobon. ISBN 978-984-8218-31-0.
- Mahmud, Dulal (2014). পাকিস্তান জাতীয় দল বাঙালি খেলোয়াড় [Bengali players in the Pakistan national team] (in Bengali). Bishhoshahitto Bhobon.
- Alam, Masud (2017). ফুটবলের গল্প ফুটবলারদের গল্প [The story of football the story of footballers] (in Bengali). Bishhoshahitto Bhobon. ISBN 9789849134688.
- Mahmud, Noman (2018). ফুটবল পায়ে মুক্তির যুদ্ধ [Liberation war fought by football] (in Bengali). Agamee Prakashani. ISBN 978-984-8218-31-0.
