= 1964 Aga Khan Gold Cup =

- Mirdad receiving the Aga Khan Gold Cup trophy from A.T.M. Mustafa

Tournament details
- Host country: East Pakistan (now Bangladesh)
- Dates: 16 October – 12 November 1964
- Teams: 16 (from 1 confederation)
- Venue: Dhaka Stadium (in Dhaka host cities)

Final positions
- Champions: (Pakistan) Karachi Port Trust (Pakistan) Mohammedan SC

Tournament statistics
- Top scorer(s): (Pakistan) Umer (Sri Lanka) S.M. Noor (Pakistan) Ghani (3 goals)

The 1964 Aga Khan Gold Cup was held at the Dhaka Stadium in Dhaka, East Pakistan (now Bangladesh), from 16 October 1964 to 12 November 1964. Dhaka Mohammedan and Karachi Port Trust were declared joint winners, drawing the final match by nil, and the replay final match by 1–1. The matches lasted 70 minutes.

After the finalisation of the tournament, Persija played exhibition matches against Karachi Selected winning 2–0 at the KMC Stadium, Pakistan Western Railway drawing 1–1 at the Ibn-e-Qasim Bagh Stadium, and Lahore Selected winning 4–2 at the Railway Stadium.

== Qualifying stage ==
16 October 1964

Wari Club (Pakistan)	1–2 (a.e.t.)	(Pakistan) East-West Pak Union SC
Zamboo 69'	Report	Hanif 60'; Saifi 84'

Dhaka Stadium, Dhaka
Referee: Masudur Rahman (Pakistan)
17 October 1964

PWD (Pakistan)	1–1	(Pakistan) Warsak FC
Farooq 23'	Report	Jehangir 5'

Dhaka Stadium, Dhaka
Referee: Sheikh Shaheb Ali (Pakistan)
18 October 1964

Karachi Port Trust (Pakistan)	5–0	(Pakistan) Fire Service AC
Taqi; Kasim; Ghani	Report

Dhaka Stadium, Dhaka
Referee: Hamza (Pakistan)
18 October 1964

Dhaka Wanderers (Pakistan)	3–2	(Pakistan) Azad SC
Raymond 50'; Amin 55' (pen.); Samad 63'	Report	Hafizuddin 5'; Nishith Chowdhury 61'

Dhaka Stadium, Dhaka
Referee: Issa Khan (Pakistan)
20 October 1964

Mohammedan SC (Pakistan)	4–0	(Pakistan) Central Printing and Stationary
Abdullah 15'; Abid 30', 47'; Eugene Gomes 37' (o.g.)	Report

Dhaka Stadium, Dhaka
Referee: Sheikh Shaheb Ali (Pakistan)
20 October 1964

Warsak FC (Pakistan)	2–1 (a.e.t.)	(Pakistan) PWD SC
Sumbal 34'; Jehangir 72'	Report	Rahim 69'

Dhaka Stadium, Dhaka
Referee: Masudur Rahman (Pakistan)
21 October 1964

Victoria SC (Pakistan)	1–0	(Pakistan) East-West Pak Union SC
Yousuf Sr. 52'	Report

Dhaka Stadium, Dhaka
Referee: Ayub Munshi (Pakistan)
21 October 1964

Pakistan Airlines	0–5	Pakistan Western Railway
	Report	Saleem 10', 22'; Idress Sr. 25', 30'; Qayyum 51'

Dhaka Stadium, Dhaka
Referee: Zahurul Alam (Pakistan)
24 October 1964

Ceylon XI (Dominion of Ceylon)	2–0	(Pakistan) Dhaka Wanderers
E.Wickremasooriya 13'; S.M. Noor 20'	Report

Dhaka Stadium, Dhaka
Referee: Issa Khan (Pakistan)

== Group stage ==
=== Group A ===
Pos	Team	Pld	W	D	L	GF	GA	GD	Pts	Qualification
1	(Pakistan) Karachi Port Trust	3	2	1	0	5	3	+2	5	Advance to the semi-finals
2	(Pakistan) Mohammedan SC	3	1	1	1	4	2	+2	3	Advance to the semi-finals
3	(Indonesia) Persija	3	1	1	1	6	5	+1	3	
4	(Dominion of Ceylon) Ceylon XI	3	0	1	2	4	9	−5	1	

Source: RSSSF
29 October 1964

Persija (Indonesia)	1–1	(Pakistan) Mohammedan SC
Didi Kasamara 2'	Report	Abdullah Adam 33'

Dhaka Stadium, Dhaka
Referee: Sheikh Shaheb Ali (Pakistan)
29 October 1964

Ceylon XI (Dominion of Ceylon)	2–2	(Pakistan) Karachi Port Trust
Sirisena 12'; S.M. Noor 34'	Report	Ismail Roshu 20' (pen.); Taqi 45'

Dhaka Stadium, Dhaka
Referee: Zahurul Alam (Pakistan)
31 October 1964

Persija (Indonesia)	4–2	(Dominion of Ceylon) Ceylon XI
Joseph Tahir 34'; Sujiptus 37', 60'; Lien 59'	Report	S.M. Noor 40', 69'

Dhaka Stadium, Dhaka
Referee: Masudur Rahman (Pakistan)
2 November 1964

Mohammedan SC (Pakistan)	0–1	(Pakistan) Karachi Port Trust
	Report	Ghani 25'

Dhaka Stadium, Dhaka
Referee: Masudur Rahman (Pakistan)
4 November 1964

Persija (Indonesia)	1–2	(Pakistan) Karachi Port Trust
Superdi 17'	Report	Mahmood 4'; Majid 50'

Dhaka Stadium, Dhaka
Referee: Issa Khan (Pakistan)
6 November 1964

Ceylon XI (Dominion of Ceylon)	0–3	(Pakistan) Mohammedan SC
	Report	Abid 42'; Adam 51'; Ansar 55'

Dhaka Stadium, Dhaka
Referee: Masudur Rahman (Pakistan)

=== Group B ===
Pos	Team	Pld	W	D	L	GF	GA	GD	Pts	Qualification
1	(Myanmar) Burma XI	3	2	1	0	4	2	+2	5	Advance to the semi-finals
2	Pakistan Western Railway	3	1	2	0	3	1	+2	4	Advance to the semi-finals
3	(Pakistan) Victoria SC	3	1	1	1	5	2	+3	3	
4	(Pakistan) Warsak FC	3	0	0	3	0	7	−7	0	

Source: RSSSF
25 October 1964

Burma XI (Myanmar)	1–0	(Pakistan) Warsak FC
Pansit 14'	Report

Dhaka Stadium, Dhaka
Referee: Masood Alam (Pakistan)
27 October 1964

Warsak FC (Pakistan)	0–4	(Pakistan) Victoria SC
	Report	Umer 39', 59'; Abbas 53'; Yousuf Jr. 68'

Dhaka Stadium, Dhaka
Referee: Ayub Munshi (Pakistan)
30 October 1964

Burma XI (Myanmar)	1–1	Pakistan Western Railway
Toe Aung 12'	Report	Qayyum 27'

Dhaka Stadium, Dhaka
Referee: Issa Khan (Pakistan)
1 November 1964

Victoria SC (Pakistan)	0–0	Pakistan Western Railway
	Report

Dhaka Stadium, Dhaka
Referee: Issa Khan (Pakistan)
3 November 1964

Burma XI (Myanmar)	2–1 Match stopped at 65'	(Pakistan) Victoria SC
Ko Ko Gyi 30'; Toe Aung 60'	Report	Umer 44'

Dhaka Stadium, Dhaka
Referee: Sheikh Shaheb Ali (Pakistan)
5 November 1964

Warsak FC (Pakistan)	0–2	Pakistan Western Railway
	Report	Saleem 32', 45'

Dhaka Stadium, Dhaka
Referee: Ayub Munshi (Pakistan)

== Knockout stage ==
=== Semi-finals ===
7 November 1964

Karachi Port Trust (Pakistan)	2–0	Pakistan Western Railway
Mahmood 7', 65'	Report

Dhaka Stadium, Dhaka
Referee: Issa Khan (Pakistan)
8 November 1964

Mohammedan SC (Pakistan)	2–0	(Myanmar) Burma XI
Ansar 37'; Pratap 58'	Report

Dhaka Stadium, Dhaka
Referee: Masudur Rahman (Pakistan)

== Final ==
=== Match ===
Balai Dey jumps up in an attempt to clear the ball.

The final, held on 10 November at the Dhaka Stadium, between Mohammedan Sporting and Karachi Port Trust, would end in a 0–0 draw. Several dangerous attacks were constructed by both sides, such as a potential extra-time match winner by Muhammad Taqi, which failed to be abortive. The replayed final, which took place on 12 November, followed the same story, with the exception of goals from Pratap Shankar Hazra, who opened the scoring by swinging in a curve shot, giving his side the lead. Ghani would equalize for the Port Trust seven minutes later, following a passing combination with Mirdad and Mahmood, Ghani would put the ball at the back of the net. The game would eventually end with both teams sharing the trophy.

10 November 1964

Mohammedan SC (Pakistan)	0–0	(Pakistan) Karachi Port Trust
	Report

Dhaka Stadium, Dhaka
Referee: Issa Khan (Pakistan)

=== Replay final ===
12 November 1964

Mohammedan SC (Pakistan)	1–1 Trophy shared	(Pakistan) Karachi Port Trust
Pratap 21'	Report	Ghani 28'

Dhaka Stadium, Dhaka
Referee: Issa Khan (Pakistan)

=== Line-ups ===
Final:

- Mohammedan Sporting: Balai Dey, Zahirul Haque, Aslam, Rasool Bakhsh, Ghulam Qadir, Ansar, Abdullah Rahi, Abdullah Jr., Abid Hussain Ghazi, Pratap Shankar Hazra.
- Karachi Port Trust: Nisar Ahmed, Abdur Rahman, Turab Ali, Sikandar, Abdul Rahim, Ismail Roshu, Mirdad, Kasim, Mahmood, Muhammad Taqi, Abdul Majid.

Replayed final:

- Mohammedan Sporting: Balai Dey, Zahirul Haque, Aslam, Rasool Bakhsh, Amin, Ghulam Qadir, Ansar (Abdullah Adam), Abdullah Rahi, Abid Hussain Ghazi, Bashir Ahmed, Pratap Shankar Hazra.
- Karachi Port Trust:Nisar Ahmed, Abdur Rahman, Turab Ali, Sikandar, Abdul Rahim, Ismail Roshu, Mirdad, Ghani, Mahmood, Muhammad Taqi, Abdul Majid.

== Statistics ==
=== 3 goals ===
- (Pakistan) Ghani
- (Pakistan) Muhammad Umer
- (Dominion of Ceylon) S.M. Noor

=== 2 goals ===
- (Pakistan) Pratap Shankar Hazra
- (Pakistan) Ansar
- (Pakistan) Mahmood
- (Pakistan) Qayyum Changezi
- (Pakistan) Muhammad Saleem
- (Myanmar) Toe Aung

=== 1 goal ===
- (Pakistan) Majid
- (Myanmar) Pansit
- (Myanmar) Ko Ko Gyi
- (Pakistan) Ghulam Abbas Baloch
- (Pakistan) Yousuf Jr.
- (Pakistan) Abid Hussain Ghazi
- (Pakistan) Abdullah Adam
- (Pakistan) Ismail Roshu
- (Pakistan) Taqi
- (Indonesia) Didi Kasamara
- (Dominion of Ceylon) Pathiniya Durage Sirisena
- (Indonesia) Joseph Tahir
- (Indonesia) Sujiptus
- (Indonesia) Lien
- (Indonesia) Superdi
