= Railway Stadium =

Railway Stadium may refer to:

- Railway Stadium, Dhanbad
- Railway Stadium, Lahore
- Railway Stadium, Karachi
- Railway Stadium, Vasco da Gama

== See also ==
- Railways Stadium
