= Turab Ali =

Pakistani footballer (1943–2009)

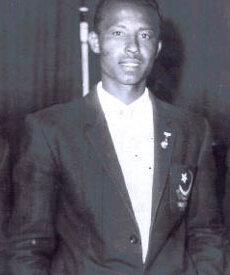
- Ali in the 1960s

Personal information
- Full name: Turab Ali
- Date of birth: 1943
- Place of birth: Karachi, British India
- Date of death: 5 June 2009 (aged 65–66)
- Place of death: Karachi, Pakistan
- Position: Centre-half

Youth career
- –1960: Lyari Mohammedan

Senior career*
Years	Team	Apps	(Gls)
1961–1964	Karachi Port Trust		
1965–1968	Mohammedan		

International career
1962	Pakistan Youth		(1)
1961–1967	Pakistan		(0)
- * Club domestic league appearances and goals

Turab Ali (Urdu: تراب علی; 1943 – 5 June 2009) was a Pakistani footballer who played as a centre-half. Dubbed as "Wall of China" or "Pillar of Hercules" during his heyday in the 1960s due to his defending abilities, he is regarded as one the most prominent Pakistan defenders in history. In 1968, Turab was selected for the Asian All Stars team, becoming the first and only Pakistani footballer to be selected for the side.

== Early life ==
Turab was born in Karachi, of then British India, in 1943.

== Club career ==
=== Early career ===
Turab started his domestic football career Shamashin Club Lyari, now known as Lyari Mohammedan. In a match between Lyari Mohammedan against the departmental side Karachi Port Trust at the KMC Stadium in 1960, Turab impressed in the game, which led to Karachi Port Trust extending an invitation for him to join their ranks. From 1961 to 1964, Turab represented the Karachi Port Trust in domestic tournaments across the country.

He also represented the Karachi Division selection at the National Football Championship, making his debut for the team in the 1960 edition against NWFP. He also captained Karachi Blues in the 1961–62 season.

Turab helped Karachi Port Trust win the 1964 Aga Khan Gold Cup, which was shared with Mohammedan, being an integral part in Karachi Port Trust's road to the final. He also represented PIA in the 1962 Aga Khan Gold Cup.

=== Mohammedan ===
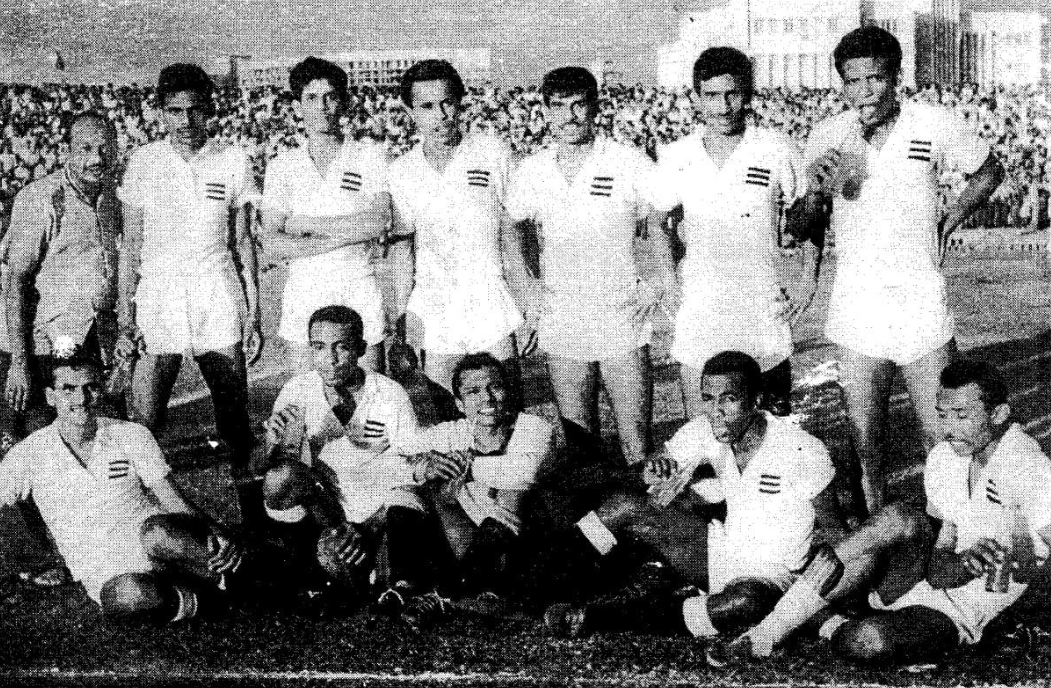
Turab (extreme right, sitting row), with Mohammedan in 1966.

In 1965, Turab was recruited by Dacca League side, Mohammedan Sporting, by Mohammedan's chief scout, Amir Jang Ghaznavi. During his stay, he also represented Dacca Division at the National Football Championship in the 1966 edition. Turab appeared for the club between 1965 and 1968. He played a key role in winning the First Division League with the club in 1965 and 1966.

== International career ==
In 1961, Turab was selected to represent the Pakistan national team for a tour against Burma, making his debut on 18 January, and appearing in all three test matches. He also participated in the 1962 AFC Youth Championship held in Bangkok, in the tournament, he scored a goal against Singapore Youth, which resulted in a 4–0 win.

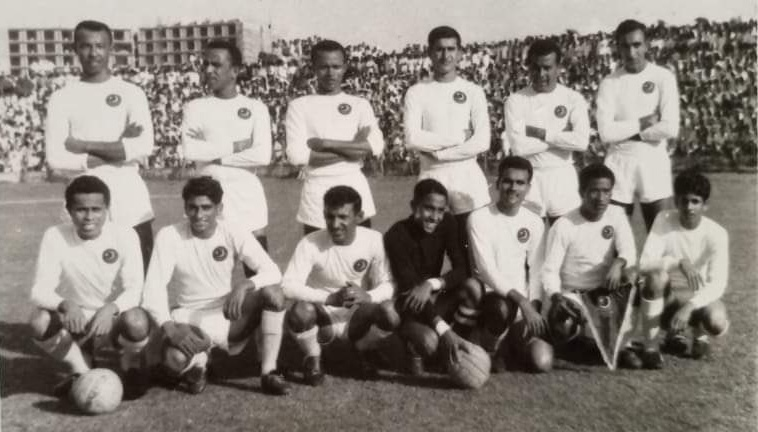
Turab (extreme left, standing row) with Pakistan in 1964.

In 1963, he featured at the second home match in Lahore of the 1964 Summer Olympics Asian Qualifiers against Iran, ending in a 1–0 win. In 1964, he toured China and made an appearance against the national side.

The following year, he toured Ceylon which included two test matches against the Ceylon national team, and was a part of the Pakistan squad for the 1965 RCD Cup. He was also selected as captain for the 1966 Asian Games, however, due to financial instability and lack of interest, Pakistan ultimately did not participate in the tournament. Instead, he captained the team to friendlies against the touring FC Alga Club. Turab retained his position as captain of the national team for the following year, where he would appear in all four matches against Saudi Arabia. He also took part in an unofficial friendly series against the touring Dallas Tornado, where he found the net in a 5–2 victory.

Turab also played the 1968 Asian Cup Qualifiers in 1967 as captain. During the qualification, a knee injury against India proved to be the end of his career. Fellow defender Wali Muhammad served as captain of the remaining match of the qualifiers against Burma after his injury. Following the conclusion of the qualifiers, in February 1968, Turab was selected as part of the AFC Asian All Stars team, becoming the first Pakistani footballer to be selected for the side. However, he could not make the appearance for the selected side as his knee injury became worse.

== Personal life ==
Turab was belonged to the locality of Lyari in Karachi. He was the eldest of four sisters and four brothers, and also used to work at a port at the beginning of his career. After leaving football, he lived in poverty. He also drove a taxi on the streets of Karachi. In 1970, the Cricketer's Guild of Pakistan, though focused on cricket, stepped in to help by raising funds of around Rs. 4,000. Players such as Alimuddin, Asif Iqbal, Mushtaq Mohammad, helped contribute to raising funds.

In July 1971, Turab was invited to a show led by Zia Mohyeddin at the Dacca TV Station which also featured Ghulam Mustafa Tabassum, Rakhshanda Khattak, Ferdausi Rahman and a Japanese guest. However, Turab was asked to leave the show shortly after starting, sparking controversy.

In the latter part of his life he became constrained and confined himself to a room. In 2003, he was given financial assistance of 50 thousand rupees in a tournament held in his name at the People's Football Stadium.

== Death ==
Turab died in Karachi on 5 June 2009. He had having been suffering from complications after a severe stroke and was admitted to the Kutiana Memon Hospital at Kharadar.

== Honours ==
=== Karachi Port Trust ===
- Aga Khan Gold Cup:
  - Winners (1): 1964

=== Mohammedan ===
- Dhaka First Division League:
  - Winners (2): 1965, 1966
- Aga Khan Gold Cup:
  - Winners (1): 1961

=== Individual ===
- AFC Asian All Stars: 1968

== See also ==
- List of Pakistan national football team captains
