= Pakistanis in Myanmar =

Pakistani diaspora in Myanmar

Pakistanis in Burma
Total population
- 300.000

Regions with significant populations
- Burma

Languages
- Burmese, Urdu, English

Religion
- Islam

Related ethnic groups
- Pakistani diaspora

Pakistanis in Burma are a historical community living in Burma who trace their origins to Pakistan. This definition includes Pakistani nationals residing in Burma and Burmese citizens who have ancestral links to Pakistan. Their history predates the independence of Pakistan in 1947.

Along with Burmese Indians, they were part of the large South Asian community in the country. Significant Muslim migration occurred to Burma during the British Raj period. Most of these migrants were Bengalis of erstwhile East Pakistan, but there were also significant communities of Urdu-speakers, Memons, Punjabis and Pashtuns.

== History ==
Large-scale Muslim immigration from the South Asia to Burma began in the 1870s, when Burma, like modern-day Pakistan, was also under the British Raj. Many of these Muslims came from areas that were to become Pakistan, and settled in various parts of Burma, including the western regions which were predominantly populated by local Burmese Muslims. Following Burma's independence in 1948, the status of Muslims from the South Asia living in Burma was profoundly affected; they could no longer display links with their places of origin and were given the option of either applying for Burmese citizenship, be considered foreigners, or become stateless. At that time, various Muslim associations in the area together united to form the "All Burma Pakistan Association" (ABPA) – a federation which came to be known as representing the "largest South Asian Muslim ethnic group in Burma." The number of Pakistanis in Burma was estimated by the leaders of the ABPA to be between 300,000 and 500,000 people; however, the accuracy of this figure could never possibly be determined given the lack of official and reliable statistics.

According to Moše Yegar, author of Between Integration and Secession, most of the Pakistanis belonged to modest, working-class socioeconomic backgrounds..

Many of the Pakistanis failed to opt for Burmese citizenship either because of "ignorance or a lack of information"; however, among them were some who intentionally managed to retain their Pakistani citizenship. Then, there were others who lost their Pakistani citizenship while at the same time failing to take up Burmese citizenship. It became one of the objectives of the ABPA to lobby Burmese authorities and the local Pakistani embassy to assist in facilitating the naturalization of those Pakistanis who sought Burmese citizenship, as well as facilitating those who wanted to acquire Pakistani passports.

== Community ==
Pakistanis in Burma remained equally loyal to Burma and Pakistan, identifying themselves with the national aspirations of both countries, and were an important link in promoting bilateral relations between the two countries. They identified as Muslims in terms of religious affiliation. Together with Burmese Indians, they were part of the large South Asian community in the country.

The All Burma Pakistan Association served as the exclusive association for all Pakistanis in Burma. The ABPA maintained strong relations with the Government of Pakistan. Whenever high-profile Pakistani personalities visited Burma, they would be personally received as guests by the APBA.

In the 2014 Myanmar Census, Pakistani residents were categorised into the "Other" ethnic category, along with Chinese and Rohingya residents.

== Exodus ==
In the years that followed independence, Pakistanis in Burma enjoyed the same lifestyles as other immigrants settled in Burma. In fact, Pakistanis were granted special privileges by the Government of Burma whereby they were given complete freedom to observe and celebrate their national and cultural events, such as raising the flag of Pakistan on occasions like Pakistan Day. Similar privileges were enjoyed by the Chinese and Hindu communities. Even the Rohingya conflict in Western Burma, led by local Muslim separatists who aspired a unification with neighboring East Pakistan, posed no political effects whatsoever upon the lives of the Pakistanis in Burma despite the momentary diplomatic scuffle that was meanwhile following between the governments of Pakistan and Burma over the conflict.

However, following the 1962 Burmese coup d'état by General Ne Win and a nationwide nationalization program, living conditions suddenly became difficult for all immigrants. The 1962 coup led to a swift exodus of South Asians from Burma, and many Muslims began returning to India and Pakistan. With the growing popularity of the Burmese National Movement post-World War II, opposition against the presence of South Asian and Muslim immigrants had begun to grow in Burma. South Asian Muslims were losing their prospects of being equal citizens and were beginning to discover themselves as a foreign minority in independent Burma. The changing hostile atmosphere triggered a mass exodus of South Asians and the Pakistani community significantly declined. Those Muslims of Pakistani origin who chose to remain were confronted by an increasingly nationalist Burmese movement and were forced to quietly assimilate into Burmese society rather than being able to freely emphasize a separate ethnic identity.

== Notable people ==
- Abdul Hamid Khan, Army General
- Eric G. Hall – Pakistan Air Force general, born and raised in Burma
- Rakshanda Khattak - Pakistan’s first supermodel

== See also ==
- Burmese people in Pakistan
- Myanmar–Pakistan relations
- Greater India
- Indosphere
- Overseas Pakistanis
