= Balai Dey =

Indian footballer (born 1946)

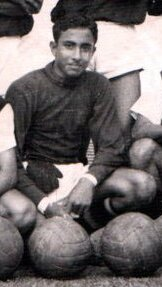
- Dey with Dhaka Mohammedan in 1963

Personal information
- Date of birth: 11 October 1946 (age 80)
- Place of birth: Kotalipara, Bengal, British India
- Height: 1.72 m (5 ft 8 in)
- Position: Goalkeeper

Senior career*
Years	Team	Apps	(Gls)
1961–1962	Khulna Heroes		
1962	Dhaka Mohammedan		
1963	Khulna Town Club		
1963–1964	Dhaka Mohammedan		
1965–1967	East Bengal		
1967	Aryan		
1968–1971	Mohun Bagan		
1971–1974	East Bengal		

International career
1964	Pakistan		
1969–1970	India		
- * Club domestic league appearances and goals

Balai Dey (Bengali: বলাই দে; born 11 October 1946) is an Indian former footballer who played as a goalkeeper. He is one of the few footballers who represented the two nations, India and Pakistan, in international football.

In July 2022, Dey was conferred with Lifetime Achievement Award by Mohun Bagan.

== Early life ==
Balai Dey was born on 11 October 1946 in Kotalipara, Gopalganj, Bengal Presidency, during the ending stage of British rule in India. He lived and studied in Khulna as he entered in Satyanarayana School and later studied at St. Joseph's High School till 1964. During his school days, he began playing football and started his youth career as a goalkeeper for Khulna Sporting Club at the age of fifteen.

== Club career ==
=== In East Pakistan ===
Dey began his club football career in East Pakistan with then renowned club Khulna Heroes of Khulna First Division League in 1961 after gaining success in playing for local Khulna-based sides. In the Khulna First Division League, his dazzling sportsmanship caught the attention of football fans, and he was picked up by Dhaka First Division League club Dhaka Mohammedan. Two legendary Dhaka Mohammedan players Kabir Ahmed and Amir Jang Ghaznavi played a crucial role in this transfer.

Dey jumping up to save a shot in the 1964 Aga Khan Gold Cup final.

In 1963, he helped the team win the First Division title under the leadership of Abid Hussain Ghazi, and emerged as one of the best goalkeepers at that time in whole Pakistan. In the league, he stopped many notable opponents like Dhaka Wanderers Club, Victoria Sporting, Wari Club Dhaka and others. Later, his tremendous performance helped the team win the prestigious Aga Khan Gold Cup (Note: The competition is widely regarded as the predecessor of AFC Champions League (held for the first time in 1967), since it was the first organized international competition that involved club teams around Asia, organized by the football authorities of East Pakistan, in collaboration with Asian Football Confederation (AFC).) in 1964. Dhaka Mohammedan and Karachi Port Trust were joint-winners of the tournament. He also played for Khulna Town Club in 1963.

=== In India ===
After his arrival in Calcutta in 1965, Jyoti Prakash Mitra wrote in 1982 in Khelar Kagaz about the journey of Dey from East Pakistan to Pakistan national football team under the headline "Padma to Ganga". He got an invitation to play for Railway FC. On the other hand, Calcutta Football League giants East Bengal was little more concerned about the approval of FIFA's international clearance as he was a foreigner. In 1965, Jyotish Guha managed East Bengal took him as a foreign recruit by surprise where Peter Thangaraj was prominent goalkeeper of the team. Dey later became an Indian citizen but got less opportunities and appeared in only a few matches from 1965 until 1967. Thus he moved to Aryan Club, one of the oldest clubs founded in 1884. With Aryan, he appeared in 1967 Calcutta League and in a match, his goalkeeping helped the team winning 2–1 against Mohun Bagan.

After coming to India, when I joined East Bengal, their first-choice goalkeeper was Peter Thangaraj. Naturally, I didn't receive too many opportunities to play. So, I shifted to Mohun Bagan and became a star there. Till today, everyone in Mohun Bagan respects me, recently they conferred me with the Lifetime Achievement award. How many sportspersons in this country can boast of playing for two nations? Everyday I thank God for giving me so much. He has given me more than I deserve.

— —Balai Dey in an interview with Scroll, on joining Mohun Bagan, leaving East Bengal.

In Indian club football, he was in hard times until his signing with Mohun Bagan in 1968. In 1969, Mohun Bagan clinched the Calcutta Football League title under the guidance of legendary coach Amal Dutta. He also helped the "green and maroons" winning major titles including Rovers Cup in 1968, 1970 and 1971, and IFA Shield in 1969. His goalkeeping for Mohun Bagan at the final of 1969 IFA Shield, helped the team winning the trophy defeating his former club East Bengal 3–1 and it was club's eleventh Shield victory. Amal Dutta was influential nurturing talents including Balai Dey and others like Monoranjan Bhattacharya, Satyajit Chatterjee.

He moved back to SC East Bengal in 1972 and played consecutively until 1974. During his spells with the "red and gold brigade", he won Calcutta Football League in 1972 and 1973, IFA Shield in 1972 and 1973, Rovers Cup in 1972 and 1973, DCM Trophy in 1973 defeating North Korean side Dok Ro Gang, and Bordoloi Trophy in 1973.

Dey also appeared in the jersey of State Bank of India. Between 1967 and 1970, he represented Bengal in Santosh Trophy and emerged champions in 1969. A standout performance for Bengal earned him a national team call-up. During the national camp in Bombay, Dey had to rush to Nowgon, Assam, in a few hours' notice after receiving an SOS from the Bengal team management and participated in the Santosh Trophy. In final, they defeated Services by 6–1.

== International career ==
=== Pakistan ===
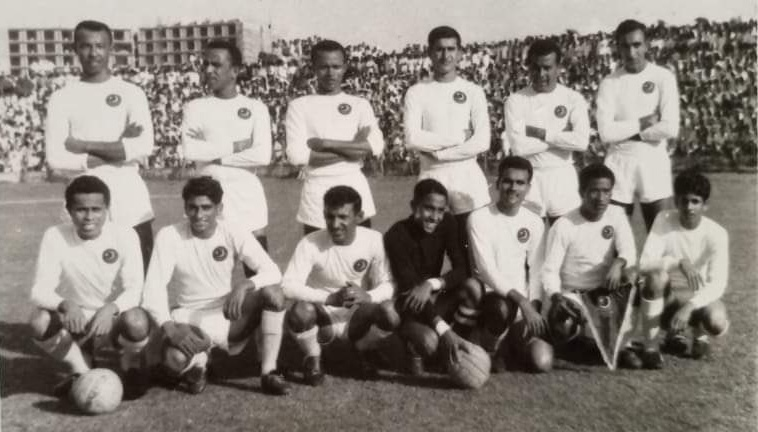
Dey as goalkeeper with the Pakistan national team in 1964

After Dey's brilliant performance with Dhaka Mohammedan in tournaments in Karachi, Lahore, Peshawar and Multan, he got a chance for trial in the Pakistan national team.

Dey and Zahirul Haque from East Pakistan earned a spot in the national squad for the tour to China in 1964, as a backup player behind starting goalkeeper Muhammad Latif. At the end of the year, he played for Pakistan in exhibition matches against touring Neftyanik from Baku, Soviet Union. After his heroic goalkeeping for Pakistan in the matches, every national newspaper of Pakistan gave the title "Flying Bird".

=== India ===
After representing Pakistan, he got the honor of playing in India national football team in 1969 after gaining Indian citizenship. He competed in the Merdeka Cup in Malaysia and the Singapore Friendship Tournament, when Jarnail Singh was the national team head coach. In Merdeka, he earned the nickname "Indian Rock". In 1970, he played in the Friendship Tournament in Iran.

== Personal life ==
"Half of my family was already living in India. In January 1965, I crossed over to India through Petrapole Border and life changed thereafter. We decided to stay in India and never again returned to Dhaka or Khulna except for occasional visits. I did come over to India, but at the back of the mind I had felt I let down Pakistan, especially my motherland, which is now Bangladesh. But once Bangladesh was born, something happened that left me immensely satisfied. In 1972, I was in East Bengal and went to play exhibition matches in Bangladesh. Luckily, I knew Bangabandhu Sheikh Mujibur Rahman from my childhood days because of my family connections. When the East Bengal team paid a visit to the great man, he told me that initially people were upset that I left Pakistan to move to India. But everybody was happy after I achieved so much in India. 'We are now proud of you', he said. I couldn't control my tears when Bangabandhu said these words."

— Balai Dey, on his move from East Pakistan to India.

Dey's twin brother Kanai Dey was also a football goalkeeper who played in Khulna First Division League. Balai Dey got the opportunity to play for the Pakistan national team during a tour of the Soviet Union in 1965, but due to family constraints, he moved to Calcutta, India on 3 January 1965, and settled in Liluah, Howrah. He was admitted to Jagannath College in Dhaka for IA and later to Surendranath College of the University of Calcutta, and did not go far to play. He got married in 1981.

== Post-playing career ==
After retiring from football, Dey began his coaching career with sub-junior teams of Mohun Bagan Athletic Club. He then earned a job at State Bank of India and later retired in 2006. Dey also worked as coach of Liluah Suryanagar Maitri Sangha club.

== Honours ==
Dhaka Mohammedan

- Dhaka First Division League: 1963
- Aga Khan Gold Cup: 1964

East Bengal

- Calcutta Football League: 1966, 1972, 1973
- Durand Cup: 1972
- Rovers Cup: 1972, 1973
- DCM Trophy: 1973
- Bordoloi Trophy: 1972, 1973

Mohun Bagan

- Calcutta Football League: 1969
- IFA Shield: 1969
- Rovers Cup: 1968, 1970, 1971

Bengal

- Santosh Trophy: 1969–70; runner-up 1967–68, 1968–69

Individual

- Mohun Bagan Lifetime Achievement Award: 2022

== See also ==
- List of association footballers who have been capped for two senior national teams
- List of Indian expatriate footballers
- Indian naturalized football players

== Bibliography ==
- Kapadia, Novy (2017). Barefoot to Boots: The Many Lives of Indian Football. Penguin Random House. ISBN 978-0-143-42641-7.
- Martinez, Dolores; Mukharji, Projit B (2009). Football: From England to the World: The Many Lives of Indian Football. Routledge. ISBN 978-1-138-88353-6. Archived from the original on 2 July 2022.
- Nath, Nirmal (2011). History of Indian Football: Upto 2009–10. Readers Service. ISBN 9788187891963. Archived from the original on 22 July 2022.
- "Triumphs and Disasters: The Story of Indian Football, 1889—2000" (PDF). Archived from the original (PDF) on 13 August 2012.
- Mukhopadhay, Subir (2018). সোনায় লেখা ইতিহাসে মোহনবাগান (transl. Mohun Bagan in the history written in gold). ISBN 978-93-850172-0-9.
- Banerjee, Argha; Basu, Rupak (2022). মোহনবাগান: সবুজ ঘাসের মেরুন গল্প (transl. Mohun Bagan: Green fields' Maroon stories). Shalidhan. ISBN 978-81-954667-0-2.
- Majumdar, Boria; Bandyopadhyay, Kausik (2006). A Social History Of Indian Football: Striving To Score. Routledge. ISBN 9780415348355. Archived from the original on 29 June 2021.
- Basu, Jaydeep (2003). Stories from Indian Football. UBS Publishers' Distributors. ISBN 9788174764546. Archived from the original on 11 October 2022.
