= Karachi Division football team =

Karachi Division
- Full name: Karachi Division football team
- Founded: 1961
- Ground: Various
- Owner: Karachi Division Football Association
- League: National Football Championship

The Karachi Division football team is a Pakistani football team representing Karachi Division in regional football competitions. The team has competed at the National Football Championship on several occasions, the premier football competition of Pakistan from 1948 till 2003.

== History ==
In 1961, under Pakistan Football Federation newly elected president Asghar Khan, the National Football Championship structure in Pakistan transitioned from provincial to divisional-based teams. The team was hence formed, and on 17 November 1961, former Pakistan national team captain Osman Jan was also appointed as a member of the selection committee.

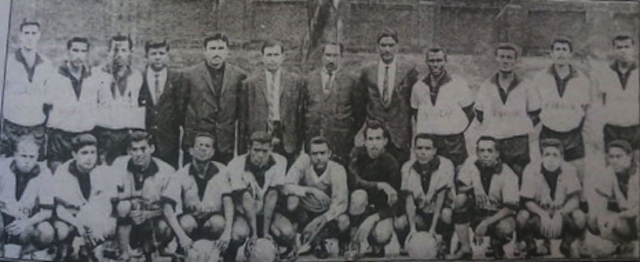
Karachi Division team, winner of 1969 National Football Championship

Between 1961 and 1966, Karachi Division and Dacca Division began dominating when the two teams won five consecutive national championships between 1960 and 1966. The team won six National Championship titles, including the 1972–73 season under the name Karachi Yellow and the 1978–79 & 1979–80 seasons under the label Karachi Red.

In September 1985, the Karachi Division team under the captainship of Abdul Wahid, visited China, where they lost their first match to Nanjiang by 2–3. The second match ended in a 1–2 loss against Zhejiang, and the last match ended in a 2–8 defeat against Shanghai. (Note: Some sources report the team visited in 1986.)

== Squads ==
=== 1964–65 National Football Championship ===
- Nisar Ahmed (Captain), Abdul Latif, Abdul Rehman, Turab Ali, Ibrahim, Nazar (Vice-captain), Rahim, Ismail Roshu, Abdul Gafur Baloch, Abdul Ghani, Mirdad, Halem, Ghulam Rabbani, Abdul Majid, Qasim, Mahmood Jr., Abdul Qadir

=== 1969 National Football Championship ===
- Hussain Killer (Captain), Muhammad Umer, Murad Bakhsh, Rahman Sr., Rahim, Ghulam Akbar, Maula Bakhsh Momin, Allah Bakhsh, Ali Nawaz Baloch, Muhammad Taqi, Abdul Majeed, Abdul Rehman Jr., Maula Bakhsh, Mustafa, Yaqoob Baloch, Niaz Gul, Rasool Bakhsh, Taj Muhammad

== Honours ==
- National Football Championship
  - Winners (6): 1963, 1964–65, 1966, 1973, 1979, 1980
  - Runners-up (4): 1961–62, 1962, 1969, 1971
