= Ismail Roshu =

Pakistani former footballer

Ismail Rashid
Personal information
- Full name: Ismail Rashid
- Date of birth: 1943 (age 82–83)
- Place of birth: Karachi, British India
- Position: Center-half

Senior career*
Years	Team	Apps	(Gls)
1950s	Karachi Kickers		
1960–??	Karachi Port Trust		
1960s	Victoria		
1960s	Dacca Wanderers		

International career
1962	Pakistan Youth		
1966	Pakistan		
- * Club domestic league appearances and goals

Ismail Rashid, commonly known as Ismail Roshu, alternatively spelled as Ismail Roshoo, (Urdu: اسماعیل راشد; born 1943) is a former Pakistani footballer, who played as a center-half. Ismail also represented the Pakistan national team in 1966.

== Early life ==
Ismail was born in 1943, at Karachi, of then British India.

== Club career ==
Ismail would represent various local clubs, he would join the Karachi Kickers in the 1950s, helping them win the 1958 Aga Khan Gold Cup. He also represented Keamari Muhammadan at the Rovers Cup held in Bombay. Ismail would eventually join Karachi Port Trust in 1960, playing for them for several years.

In 1964, Ismail helped Karachi Port Trust become joint champions of the 1964 Aga Khan Gold Cup, alongside Mohammedan Sporting Club.

Ismail also represented the Karachi Division football team at the National Football Championship, being first selected for the Karachi Whites in 1960. Where he helped the team finish runners-up, he was also a part of the Karachi Blues team which secured a runners-up position at the National Football Championship. Later on, Ismail contributed to Karachi Division's three consecutive championship titles from 1963 to 1966.

Ismail also played for Victoria Sporting Club and Dacca Wanderers in the 1960s.

== International career ==
In 1962, Ismail was selected to represent Pakistan Youth at the 1962 AFC Youth Championship held in Bangkok, Thailand.

Four years later, Ismail was called up to the Pakistan national football team for their participation in the 1966 Asian Games, however, the team ultimately failed to travel due to travel restrictions and financial instability. He would make appearances in a friendly series against Alga Club in 1966 and an exhibition friendly against PIA at the KMC Stadium.

== Personal life ==
Ismail's uncle, Dad Muhammad was also a professional footballer in the late 1940s to early 1950s. His younger brothers Abdullah Akbar, Ali Nawaz Baloch and Altaf Hussain were also footballers.

== Honours ==
=== Karachi Port Trust ===
- Aga Khan Gold Cup:
  - Winners (1): 1964 (joint)

=== Karachi Division ===
- National Football Championship:
  - Winners (3): 1963, 1964–65, 1966
  - Runners-up (2): 1960, 1961–62
