= Muhammad Yaqub (footballer) =

Pakistani former footballer

Personal information
- Date of birth: Unknown
- Place of birth: Karachi, British India
- Date of death: Unknown
- Position: Striker

Senior career*
Years	Team	Apps	(Gls)
1950s	Karachi Kickers		
1950s	Printing and Stationery		
1960–1962	Dacca Wanderers	32+	(37+)
1960s	Pakistan Airlines		

International career
1961	Pakistan	2	(0)
- * Club domestic league appearances and goals

Muhammad Yaqub (Note: Name variously transliterated as Yakub, Yaqoob, and Yakoob in historical sources.) (Urdu: محمد یعقوب) was a Pakistani footballer who played as a striker. Yaqub is regarded as one of the most notable Pakistani footballers of his era.

== Early life ==
Yaqub was born at Karachi, of then British India.

== Club career ==
Yaqub began his career with several Karachi's clubs, such as Printing and Stationery of Karachi at the Karachi Football League, he notably played for the Karachi Kickers in the 1950s, helping win the 1958 Aga Khan Gold Cup, where he scored a brace in the final. He also represented the Karachi football team at the 1957 and 1958 editions of the National Football Championship, in the 1957 edition, he scored a hat-trick in the opening match against Pakistan Air Force for Karachi, along with a goal in the semi-finals against Punjab which resulted in a 1–2 loss, marking the team's exit from their campaign.

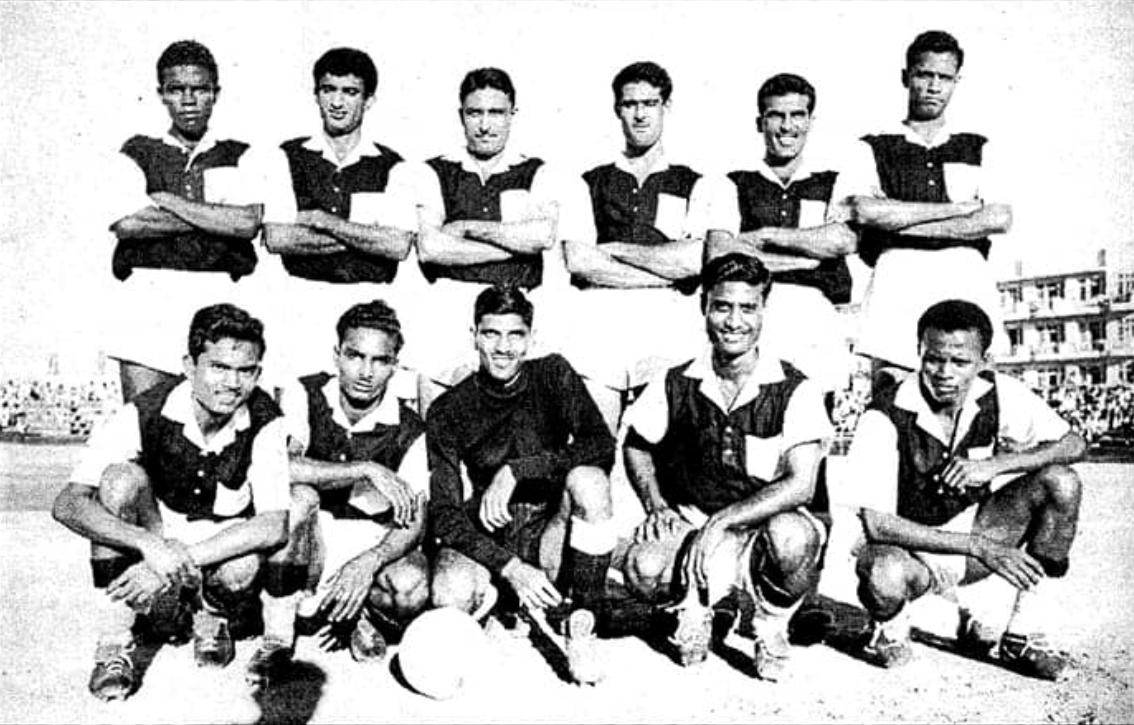
Yaqub standing second from right to left with Dhaka Wanderers Club at the Pakistan President's Gold Cup in Karachi in 1961.

In 1960, Yaqub joined Dacca League side, Dacca Wanderers, in his debut season, Yaqub would help the club win the league, and finished as the top goal-scorer with 26 goals, along with three hat-tricks to his name. He would go on to appear for the Dacca Wanderers till 1962. At the 1960 National Football Championship, he represented the East Pakistan football team, where he was the top goal-scorer with 7 goals. He would then represent Mohammedan Sporting at the 1962 Aga Khan Gold Cup.

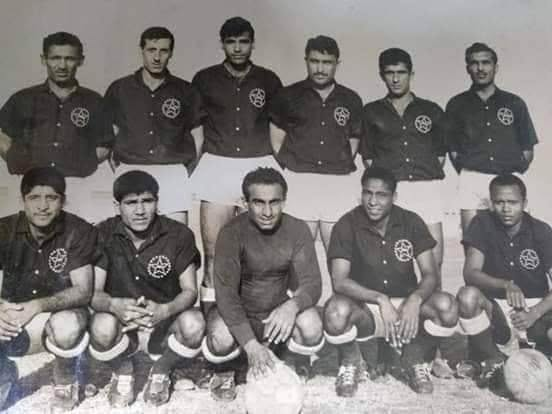
Yaqub (extreme right, top row), with Pakistan Airlines in 1966.

Later on, he would transfer to Pakistan Airlines in the 1960s.

== International career ==
In 1961, Yaqub was called upon by the Pakistan national football team for their test series against Burma, where he came on as a substitute for Qayyum Changezi in the first match, and then started in the second, being subbed off and replaced by Ghulam Abbas Baloch.

The following year, he was a part of the team which secured a runners-up position at the 1962 Merdeka Tournament. On 21 September 1962, Yaqub found the back of the net in the 15th minute against a FA Malaya XI in a 2–3 loss.

== Honours ==
=== Pakistan ===
- Merdeka Tournament
  - Runners-up (1): 1962

=== Karachi Kickers ===
- Aga Khan Gold Cup: 1958

=== Dacca Wanderers ===
- Dhaka First Division Football League:
  - Winners (1): 1960

=== Individual ===
- National Football Championship top goal-scorer: 1960 (7 goals)
- Dhaka First Division League top goal-scorer: – 1960 (26 goals)
