= Ghulam Rabbani =

Pakistani footballer (1936 – 2010)

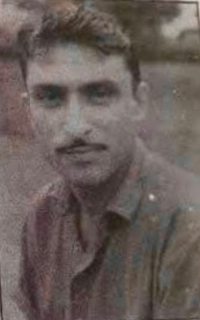

Personal information
- Full name: Sheikh Ghulam Rabbani
- Date of birth: 31 December 1936
- Place of birth: Delhi, British India
- Date of death: 10 December 2010 (aged 73)
- Place of death: Karachi, Pakistan
- Position: Right winger

Senior career*
Years	Team	Apps	(Gls)
1953–1959	Karachi Moghal FC		
1960–1962	Dacca Wanderers		(17+)
1963–??	Pakistan Airlines		

International career
1954–1963	Pakistan		

Managerial career
- 1970s: Pakistan Airlines
- * Club domestic league appearances and goals

Sheikh Ghulam Rabbani (31 December 1936 – 10 December 2010), was a Pakistani professional footballer who played as a right winger. Rabbani represented the Pakistan national football team from 1954 until the 1960s, captaining the team in 1961.

== Early life ==
Rabbani was born on 31 December 1936 in Delhi in British India. He moved to Karachi in the newly formed Pakistan following the partition.

== Club career ==
Rabbani started his career with Pakistan Mughal Football Club in 1953, he represented the Punjab selection at the National Football Championship, and played a crucial role in helping the competition two times.

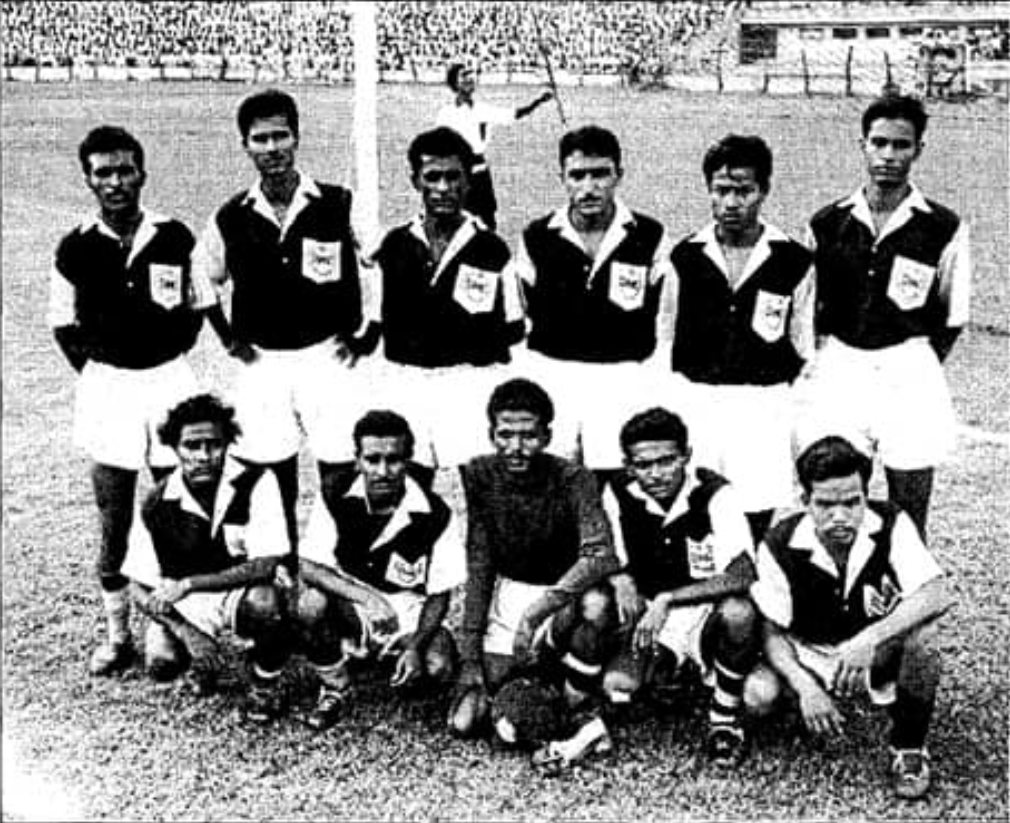
Rabbani standing fourth from left to right with Dhaka Wanderers Club at the 1960 Aga Khan Gold Cup

In 1960, Rabbani joined Dhaka Wanderers Club in the Dhaka First Division Football League, where he spent two years, being the second highest top goal-scorer of the league in 1960 with 12 goals and one hat-trick to his name. During his time in Dhaka, Rabbani represented Victoria as a guest player at the 1962 Aga Khan Gold Cup. He also represented the East Pakistan selection at the 1960 National Football Championship, helping the side win their maiden title, and later won two titles with Dacca Division in 1961–62 and 1962, notably scoring in both finals respectively.

He later played for Pakistan Airlines joining the Karachi based departmental side on 4 April 1963 before his eventual retirement. He also won the national title with the Karachi Division in 1963 and 1965.

== International career ==
Rabbani was first selected for the Pakistan national team at the 1954 Asian Quadrangular Football Tournament in Calcutta featuring against India, his performances playing for the Dhaka Wanderers Club selected him once again for the national team for the 1958 Asian Games. He featured in the 1960 and 1962 Merdeka Tournament. In the later edition under the leadership of Muhammad Umer, he played a key role in Pakistan finishing as runner-ups of the tournament.

After the 1960 Merdeka Tournament concluded, Rabbani was selected for the Eastern/Western Zones Combined football team for the proposed Asian All-Stars tour of Europe, which ultimately never materialised. Other Pakistan players selected for the combined team included Abid Hussain Ghazi, Qayyum Changezi, Hussain Killer and Moosa Ghazi. On 15 August 1960, he played as starter along with Changezi for the Eastern/Western Zones Combined football team against Central Zone Combined, in a trial match for the tour.

In 1961, he captained the national team, during Burma national team tour to East Pakistan with matches played in Dhaka and Chittagong. The following year, Rabbani played a crucial role in Pakistan's participation in the 1962 Merdeka Tournament, also being included in the starting line-up for the final.

Rabbani would mark his final appearances for the national team in a friendly series against China in 1963.

== Post–playing career ==
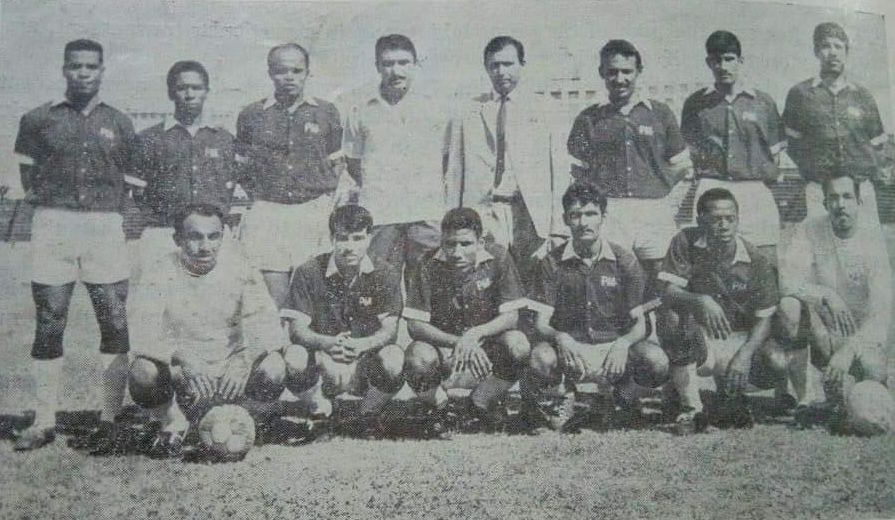
Rabbani (fourth from left to right) with Pakistan Airlines at the 1970 Aga Khan Gold Cup

After his eventual retirement as player, Rabbani became member of the coaching staff of Pakistan Airlines. He is one of the key figures responsible to launch the Pakistan Airlines football team in the late 1960s, which eventually became the most successful team in the National Football Championship.

Rabbani also served the Pakistan Football Federation Selection Committee as a member.

== Playing style ==
A right winger, Rabbani was praised for his speed and dribbling skills, and was often regarded as one of the fastest runners in Pakistani football. He was also praised for his ability to create space, bring the ball into the danger zone and send pin-point crosses.

== Death ==
Rabbani died on Friday of 10 December 2010.

== Career statistics ==
=== International goals ===
Scores and results list Pakistan's goal tally first, score column indicates score after each Rabbani goal.

List of international goals scored by Ghulam Rabbani
No.	Date	Venue	Opponent	Score	Result	Competition	Ref.
1	19 August 1960	Singapore	Singapore	1–1	1–4	Friendly	

== Honours ==
Pakistan

- Merdeka Tournament:
  - Runners-up (1): 1962

=== Punjab ===
- National Football Championship:
  - Winners (2): 1957, 1958

=== East Pakistan ===
- National Football Championship:
  - Winners (1): 1960

=== Dhaka Wanderers ===
- Dhaka First Division League:
  - Winners (1): 1960

=== Dacca Division ===
- National Football Championship:
  - Winners (2): 1961–62, 1962

=== Karachi Division ===
- National Football Championship:
  - Winners (2): 1963, 1965

=== Victoria ===
- Aga Khan Gold Cup:
  - Winners (1): 1962

== See also ==
- List of Pakistan national football team captains
