= Ko Ko Gyi (footballer) =

Burmese footballer

Personal information
- Date of birth: 26 October 1938
- Place of birth: Moulmein, British Burma
- Date of death: 9 February 2019 (aged 80)
- Place of death: Las Vegas, Nevada, United States
- Position: Striker

Senior career*
Years	Team	Apps	(Gls)
- Tenasserim Division
1955–1966	Customs FC		

International career
- Burma
- * Club domestic league appearances and goals

Ko Ko Gyi (Burmese: ကိုကိုကြီး, [kò kò dʑí]; 26 October 1938 – 9 February 2019) was a Burmese footballer who played as a forward. He is regarded as one of the most notable Burmese footballers.

== Early life ==
Ko Ko Gyi was born on 26 October 1938 in Moulmein, British Burma.

== Club career ==
Ko Ko Gyi began his football career with Tenasserim Division before joining Customs FC.

== International career ==
Ko Ko Gyi represented the Burma national team during the late 1950s and early 1960s.

He toured Pakistan with Burma in January 1961, scoring in Burma's 3–1 victory over Pakistan in the first match, and another at a 1–1 draw in the third match. He also scored six goals in Burma's 9–1 victory over the East Pakistan representative side in Chittagong. He won the silver medal with Burma at the 1961 SEAP Games. He scored twice in the 2–3 loss against Malaya at the 1962 Merdeka Tournament. He also represented Burma at the 1964 Aga Khan Gold Cup.

== Personal life and death ==
Ko Ko Gyi died on 9 February 2019 at his home in Las Vegas, Nevada, United States.

== Career statistics ==
=== International goals ===
Scores and results list Burma's goal tally first, score column indicates score after each Ko Ko Gyi goal.

List of international goals scored by Ko Ko Gyi
No.	Date	Venue	Opponent	Score	Result	Competition	Ref.
1	18 January 1961	Dacca Stadium, Dhaka, East Pakistan	Pakistan		3–2	Friendly	
2	27 January 1961	Niaz Stadium, Chittagong, East Pakistan	Pakistan		1–1	Friendly	
3	12 September 1962	Merdeka Stadium, Kuala Lumpur, Malaya	Malaya		2–3	1962 Merdeka Tournament	
4	12 September 1962	Merdeka Stadium, Kuala Lumpur, Malaya	Malaya		2–3	1962 Merdeka Tournament	
