= Nisar Ahmed (footballer) =

Pakistani footballer (born 1943)

Personal information
- Full name: Nisar Ahmed
- Date of birth: 1943 (age 82–83)
- Place of birth: Karachi, British India
- Position: Goalkeeper

Youth career
- Mohammedan Sporting Karachi

Senior career*
Years	Team	Apps	(Gls)
- West Pakistan Government Press
1961–??	Karachi Port Trust		

International career
1962	Pakistan Youth		
1967	Pakistan	4	(0)
- * Club domestic league appearances and goals

Nisar Ahmed (Urdu: نثار احمد; born 1943) was a Pakistani footballer who played as a goalkeeper. Ahmed played for most of the part for Karachi Port Trust, winning the 1964 Aga Khan Gold Cup, and represented the Pakistan national football team in 1967.

== Early life ==
Ahmed was born in Karachi in 1943.

== Club career ==
Ahmed first played for Mohammedan Sporting Karachi and West Pakistan Government Press, until joining Karachi Port Trust in 1961. He was first selected for National Football Championship representative side Karachi Division in 1960. In the 1962 National Championship, he led Karachi Division to the final until losing against Dacca Division. He captained Karachi Division at the 1964/65 National Championship, guiding the team to the title. He won the 1964 Aga Khan Gold Cup, after KPT were declared joint winners along with Dhaka Mohammedan, drawing the final match by nil, and the replay final match by 1–1.

== International career ==
Ahmed participated in the 1962 AFC Youth Championship held in Bangkok.

Ahmed was first called by the senior national team in 1963 for the friendly matches against touring China. In March 1967, Ahmed was selected for the Pakistan national team for the friendly matches against Saudi Arabia. He featured in all four matches as starter against the touring team.

== Honours ==
Karachi Division

- National Football Championship (3): 1963, 1964–65, 1966

Karachi Port Trust

- Aga Khan Gold Cup (1): 1964
