= Muhammad Taqi (footballer) =

Pakistani former footballer

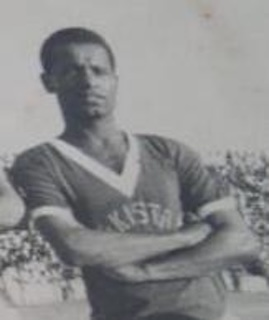
- Taqi with Pakistan in 1966.

Personal information
- Date of birth: 1944 (age 81–82)
- Place of birth: Karachi, British India
- Positions: Left winger; right winger

Senior career*
Years	Team	Apps	(Gls)
1961–??	Karachi Port Trust		
1960s	KMC		

International career
1962	Pakistan Youth		
1966	Pakistan		
- * Club domestic league appearances and goals

Muhammad Taqi is a Pakistani former footballer who played as a forward. Taqi represented the Pakistan national team in 1966.

== Early life ==
Taqi was born in 1944, in the Lyari locality of Karachi, British India.

== Club career ==
Taqi was a member of several clubs such as Baghdad Sports, PWD, he joined Karachi Port Trust in 1961. Being a part of the team for several years before transferring to KMC.

He also represented the Karachi Division football team at the National Football Championship. He scored in the final of the 1961–62 edition against Dhaka Division by reducing the margin to 1–6.

== International career ==
In 1962, Taqi represented the Pakistan Youth at the 1962 AFC Youth Championship, in the tournament, he scored a brace against Singapore Youth, which resulted in a 4–0 win. Four years later, Taqi was called up to the Pakistan national football team for the 1966 Asian Games, however, due to financial constraints and lack of proper preparation, the team ultimately failed to participate in the tournament.

Taqi was included for the Pakistan team for a test series against Alga Club. On 22 November 1966, Taqi would score for the national team in an unofficial friendly game against PIA at the KMC Stadium.

== Honours ==
- National Football Championship:
  - Runners-up (3): 1960, 1961–62, 1962
