= Mirdad (footballer) =

Pakistani former footballer

Personal information
- Full name: Mirdad
- Date of birth: Unknown
- Place of birth: Karachi, British India
- Date of death: Unknown
- Place of death: Pakistan
- Positions: Right winger; midfielder

Senior career*
Years	Team	Apps	(Gls)
1950s–1969	Karachi Port Trust		
1970–??	Pakistan Airlines		

International career
1962	Pakistan		
- * Club domestic league appearances and goals

Mirdad, commonly also misspelled as Mir dad, (Urdu: مرداد) was a former Pakistani footballer, who played as for Karachi Port Trust, Mirdad also represented the Pakistan national team in the 1960s.

== Club career ==
Mirdad (right), receiving the 1964 Aga Khan Gold Cup trophy.

Mirdad played for the Karachi Port Trust at domestic level. He helped them win the 1964 Aga Khan Gold Cup, where they were joint champions with Mohammedan Sporting. He also captained the side on several occasions.

At the National Football Championship, he represented the Karachi football team, and later on Karachi Division selections.

Later on, he was a part of the Pakistan Airlines.

== International career ==
In 1962, Mirdad was selected as one of the members of the squad for the 1962 Merdeka Tournament, where Pakistan secured a runners-up position.

Later on in 1966, Mirdad was selected for the national team's participation at the 1966 Asian Games. However, due to financial instability and political interference, Pakistan ultimately did not participate in the tournament. Instead, Mirdad played several unofficial exhibition matches against the touring Alga Club and appearead in a exhibition match against PIA at the KMC Stadium.

== Honours ==
- Aga Khan Gold Cup:
  - Winners (1): 1964 (joint)
