= Rakhshanda Khattak =

Pakistani model (1947–2011)

- رخشندہ خٹک
- Born: 1 July 1947; Burma, British India (present-day Rakhine State, Myanmar)
- Died: 1 December 2011 (aged 64); Calgary, Alberta, Canada
- Citizenship: Canadian
- Education: Southern Alberta Institute of Technology
- Occupation: Model
- Years active: 1965–1979

Rakhshanda Khattak (Urdu: رخشندہ خٹک; 1 July 1947 – 1 December 2011) was a Pakistani model. She was active as one of the country's leading fashion models in the 1970s before quitting and emigrating to Canada in 1979.

== Early life ==
Khattak was born on 1 July 1947 in British Burma (then a part of British India) to a Pashtun father and a Burmese mother, one month before the Partition of British India into the independent states of India and Pakistan. Her surname comes from her father's Pashtun tribe, the Khattaks.

== Career ==
Khattak has been dubbed by Pakistani media as Pakistan’s first supermodel. Her foray into the Pakistani show business began when she modelled products for a family friend. Khattak's early modelling attracted the attention of other agencies, and she soon exploded into the public consciousness. At the time, Pakistan lacked a sufficient number of management companies for modelling, and most models reportedly did their own hair, makeup and wardrobe. In 1971, she starred in the action feature film Jane Bond 008 and performed her own stunts. Throughout the movie, Khattak wore a low-waist sari which subsequently influenced a popular trend for young women to drape their saris closer to their hips.

== Personal life ==
Khattak was fluent in five languages. She was the first Pakistani woman to earn a black belt in karate and the second to earn a black belt in jiu-jitsu.

She married Hussain Javeri, a Pakistani jeweler, in 1970. Javeri owned a well-known jewelry store on Victoria Road (now Abdullah Haroon Road) in the city of Karachi, and designed some of the jewelry that Khattak wore at public gatherings. In 1979, Khattak migrated to Canada with her family and settled in Calgary, Alberta. She became naturalized as a Canadian citizen in 1983. Whilst in Canada, Khattak attended the Southern Alberta Institute of Technology and earned a degree in cooking and baking.

She died at her apartment in Calgary on 1 December 2011, aged 64.

== See also ==
- Pakistanis in Burma
