= Zahirul Haque =

Bangladeshi footballer (1935–2024)

- Zahir in 2013

Personal information
- Full name: Zahirul Haque Zahir
- Date of birth: 5 January 1935
- Place of birth: Nabinagar, Tipperah District, Bengal Presidency (present-day Brahmanbaria District, Bangladesh)
- Date of death: 6 January 2024 (aged 89)
- Place of death: Dhaka, Bangladesh
- Position: Right-back

Youth career
- 1953: Central Printing Press

Senior career*
Years	Team	Apps	(Gls)
1954–1956	Tejgaon Friends Union		
1957–1958	Central Printing Press		
1959	Police		
1960–1976	Mohammedan		

International career
1957–1963	East Pakistan		
1961–1964	Pakistan		
- * Club domestic league appearances and goals

Zahirul Haque (Bengali: জহিরুল হক; 5 January 1935 – 6 January 2024), simply known as Zahir, was a Bangladeshi footballer who played as a right-back.

== Early life ==
Born in Nabinagar Upazila of Brahmanbaria District on 5 January 1935, Zahir completed his Matriculation examination from Salgram High School in 1952. Eventually, he took up a job in the Dhaka Law Reports office in order to finance further education. He was later able to continue his studies at Jagannath College.

== Club career ==
=== Early career ===
Zahir debuted in Dhaka football with Central Printing and Stationery Club in the Dhaka Second Division League, and his performances attracted offers from top-tier clubs. In 1954, he entered the First Division, with Tejgaon Friends Union through the recommendation of the club's administrator, Dinesh Chandra Sen.

Zahir rejoined Central Printing in 1956 following the club's promotion to the First Division. He also helped Central Printing finish as runners-up in the First Division during his final season in 1958 and in the same year, played in the IFA Shield as a guest player for Mohammedan SC. He took up a job in the East Pakistan Police in 1959 and represented Police AC in the league that year alongside notable East Pakistani player Nabi Chowdhury, who had previously captained the Pakistan national team.

=== Mohammedan Sporting Club ===
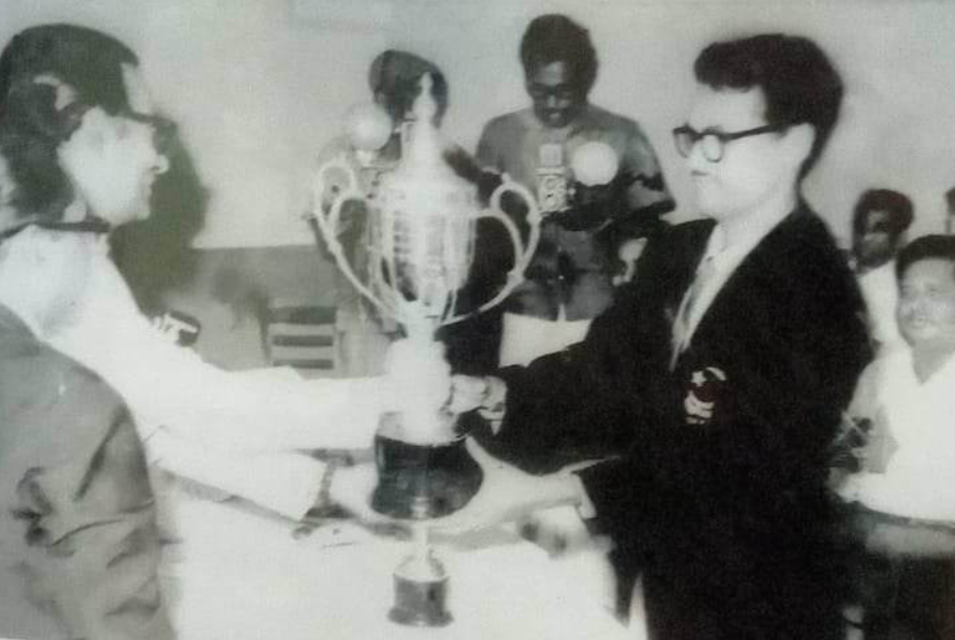
Zahir receiving the Sports Writers Association's Best Sportsperson Award in 1964 as Mohammedan captain.

Zahir quit his job in the East Pakistan Police force in 1960, and rejoined the State Bank of Pakistan (whose East Pakistan section became Bangladesh Bank in December 1971). In the same year, he joined Mohammedan SC at the suggestion of the club's official, Mohammad Shahjahan. Zahir went on to serve as club captain from 1961 to 1965 (excluding 1963). He won seven First Division titles while captaining the 1961 and 1965 triumphs. Zahir also won the Aga Khan Gold Cup twice, first as captain in 1964 and again in 1968. He played in the finals of Pakistan's Independence Day Tournament thirteen times and came out as champion on four different editions, all of them representing the Black and Whites.

On 13 February 1972, Zahir represented President's XI against Bangladesh XI during what was the first football game held since the Independence of Bangladesh. Later on that year, he was part of the Mohammedan team which won the first edition of the Independence Cup, a tournament held to celebrate the country's independence. He also won the league titles in 1975 and 1976, although by then as an irregular in the team. He retired on 3 May 1976, after securing his seventh and final league title with the club. His sixteen-year-long spell at the club has not been matched by any player since.

== International career ==
=== East Pakistan ===
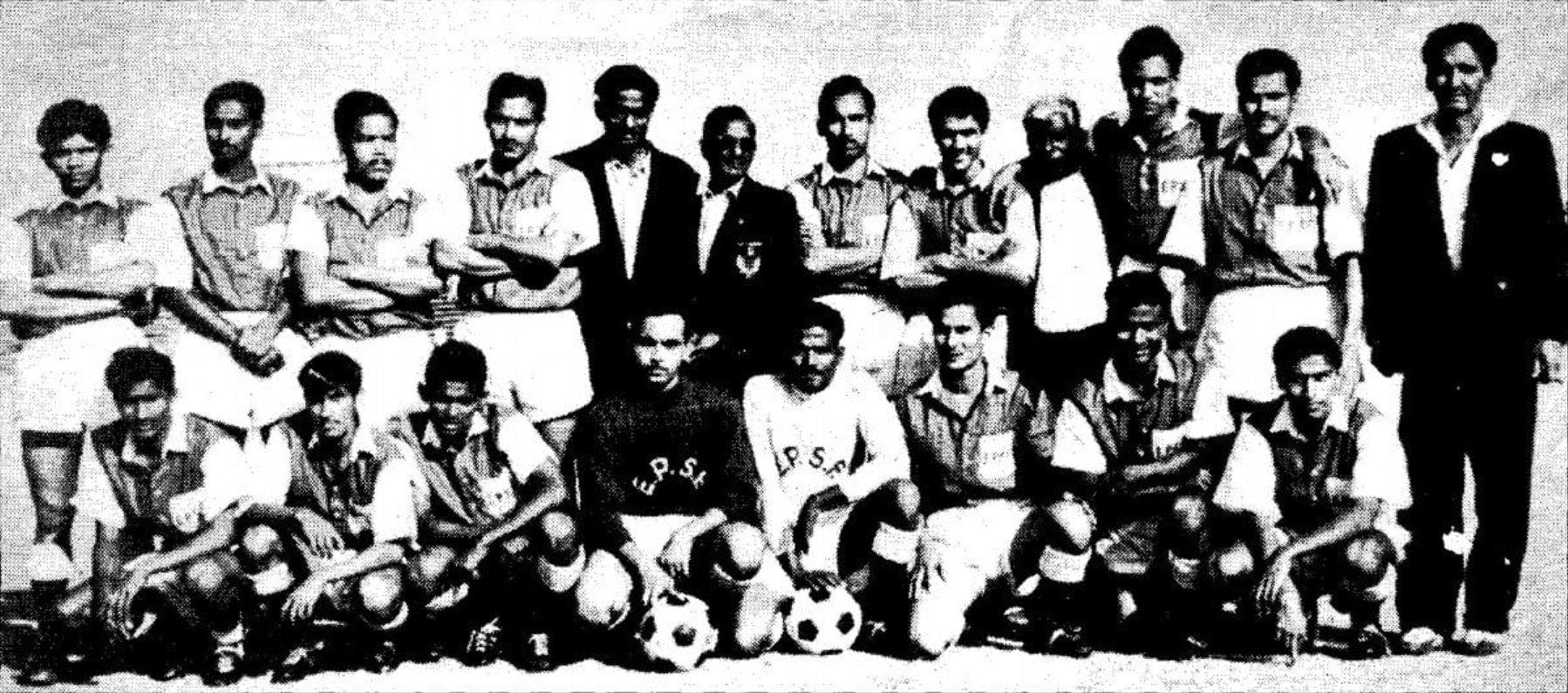
Zahir (standing second from right) with the East Pakistan football team in 1963 before a friendly against China.

Zahir made his debut for the East Pakistan football team in 1957. In 1960, he was made team captain by coach Sheikh Shaheb Ali as East Pakistan made history by winning the National Football Championship for the very first time. In the tournament's final held in Karachi, East Pakistan defeated Karachi White 1–0. In 1963, he played for East Pakistan Sports Board XI against touring German club Fortuna Düsseldorf. In 1961, he represented East Pakistan Selected XI during two exhibition games against Burma in Dhaka and Chittagong. In 1966, he captained East Pakistan XI during an exhibition match against Alga Soccer Club from the United States. After the National Championship was made division-based in 1961, Zahir represented Chittagong Division until 1970 as captain. In his final year, Chittagong won their first title by defeating Peshawar in the final held in Cumilla.

=== Pakistan ===
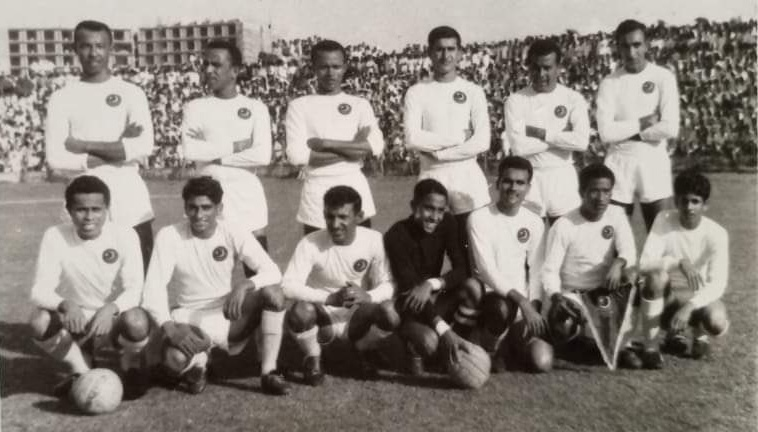
Pakistan national team in 1964, with Zahir sitting third from right.

On 18 January 1961, Zahir debuted for the Pakistan national team during a 3–1 defeat to the touring Burma. He was also part of the Pakistan team which finished runners-up in the 1962 Merdeka Tournament. The following year, he represented Pakistan against the touring China national team, under fellow East Pakistani, coach Sheikh Shaheb Ali. In 1964, he participated in the China Independence Day Cup and also appeared in three exhibition games against Neftyanik from Baku, Soviet Union. The games were held in Dhaka, Chittagong and Karachi, respectively, with Zahir captaining Pakistan during the game held in Chittagong.

== Illness and death ==
In September 2016, Zahir was admitted to Ayesha Memorial Hospital in Mohakhali, Dhaka, after suffering from kidney complications.

Zahir died due to a heart attack at Ibn Sina Hospital, in Dhaka, on 6 January 2024. He was initially admitted to the hospital on 4 January due to heart complications and fell into a coma on his 89th birthday, the following day. Zahir was buried in the Banani graveyard, beside his father, Nurul Haque.

== Honours ==
Mohammedan SC

- Dhaka First Division League: 1961, 1963, 1965, 1966, 1969, 1975, 1976
- Aga Khan Gold Cup: 1964, 1968
- Independence Day Tournament: 1960, 1961, 1963, 1966
- Mohammad Ali Bogra Shield: 1966
- Independence Cup: 1972

East Pakistan

- National Football Championship: 1960

Chittagong Division

- National Football Championship: 1970

Pakistan

- Merdeka Tournament runner-up: 1962

Individual

- 1964 − Sports Writers Association's Best Sportsperson Award.
- 2001 − National Sports Award.
- 2012 − Grameenphone - Prothom Alo Sports Lifetime award of the Year.

== Bibliography ==
- Mahmud, Dulal (2014). পাকিস্তান জাতীয় দল বাঙালি খেলোয়াড় (transl. Bengali players in the Pakistan national team) (in Bengali). Bishhoshahitto Bhobon.
- Mahmud, Dulal (2020). খেলার মাঠে মুক্তিযুদ্ধ (transl. Liberation war in the playground) (in Bengali). Bishhoshahitto Bhobon. ISBN 978-984-8218-31-0.
- Alam, Masud (2017). ফুটবলের গল্প ফুটবলারদের গল্প (transl. The story of football the story of footballers) (in Bengali). Bishhoshahitto Bhobon. ISBN 9789849134688.
- Mahmud, Noman (2018). ফুটবল পায়ে মুক্তির যুদ্ধ (transl. Liberation war fought by football) (in Bengali). Agamee Prakashani. ISBN 978-984-8218-31-0.
