= Faqir Hussain =

Pakistani footballer (1938 – 2016)

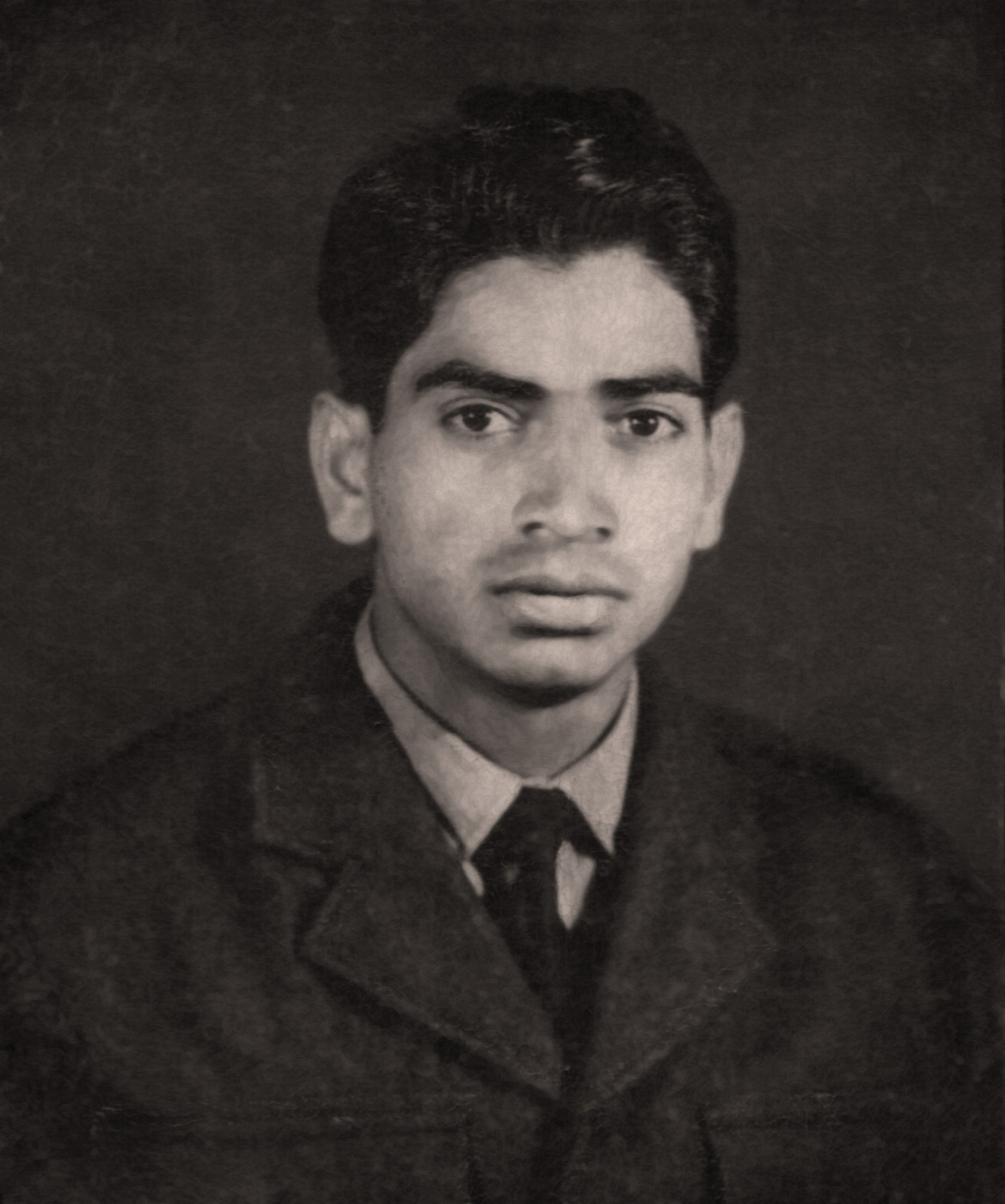

Personal information
- Full name: Faqir Hussain
- Place of birth: Peshawar, British India
- Date of death: 24 February 2016
- Place of death: Peshawar, Pakistan
- Position: Right winger

Senior career*
| Years | Team | Apps | (Gls) |
| 1955–1969 | Pakistan Air Force | | |

International career
| 1959–1965 | Pakistan | | |
- * Club domestic league appearances and goals

Faqir Hussain (died 24 February 2016) was a Pakistani footballer who played as a right winger. Hussain played for Pakistan Air Force throughout his career, and also represented the Pakistan national team from 1959 until the mid-1960s.

== Club career ==
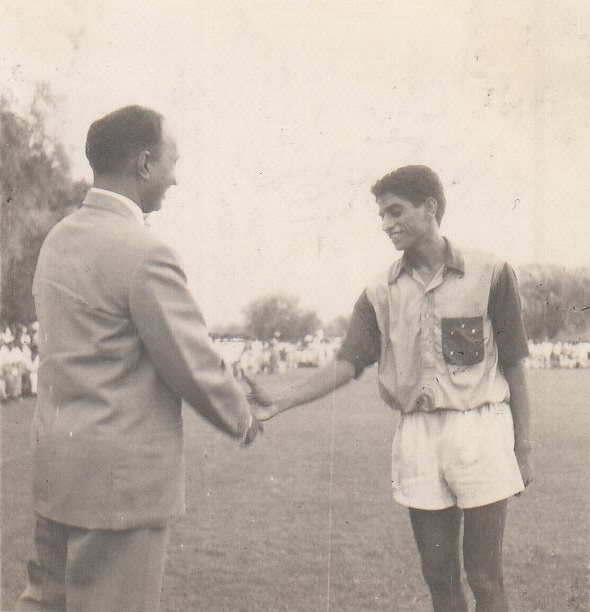
Faqir with Nur Khan after winning Inter Services Football in 1965

In 1955, Hussain participated at the Army Football Tournament in Iran with the Pakistan Combined Services football team while playing for Pakistan Airforce, in a tournament which showcased army football teams from India, Iran, Turkey, Iraq, and Syria. Along with Moideen Kutty, Hussain was a crucial player of the Air Force team.

In August 1960, he scored in a 2–0 victory against a select team from Hoshiarpur in the 25th minute during the fifth Ismail Gold Shield Football Tournament in the semifinals. The tournament which featured teams from India and Iran concluded with PAF winning the final. He also played the Inter-Services Football Championship for Pakistan Air Force at the domestic level in Pakistan. In the 8th edition of the championship in 1960, Faqir scored a hat-trick against Pakistan Army winning the final by 3–0.

In 1961, while playing for Pakistan Airforce in a friendly game against the Iranian club Shahin F.C., he scored all 4 goals for his team in a match which ended in a 6–4 defeat.

In 1969, Faqir scored seven out of eleven goals against Pakistan Navy in the opening match of the Inter-Services Football Championship.

== International career ==
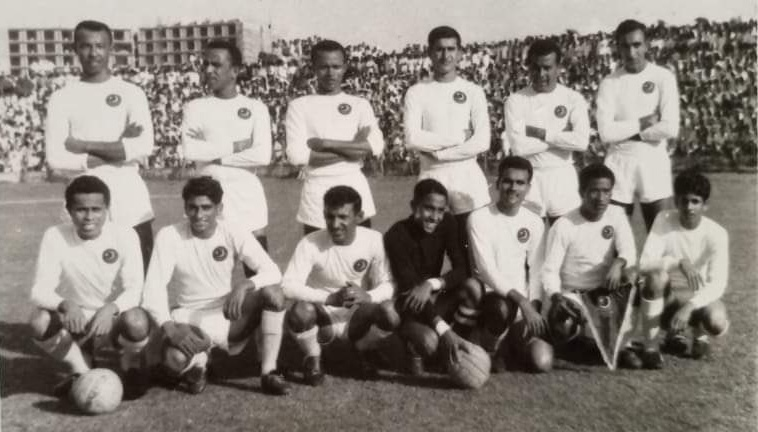
Faqir sitting second from left with the Pakistan national team in 1964

Hussain played for the Pakistan national team in the 1960s. He was among the players present in the 1960 Asian Cup qualifiers hosted by India in Ernakulam in 1959, where Pakistan faced Iran, India and Israel twice each in the qualifiers. Hussain scored a goal in a memorable victory over Iran by 4–1.

In 1964, he also played 1964 Summer Olympics qualification against Iran. He also played at the 1965 RCD Cup.

== Coaching career ==
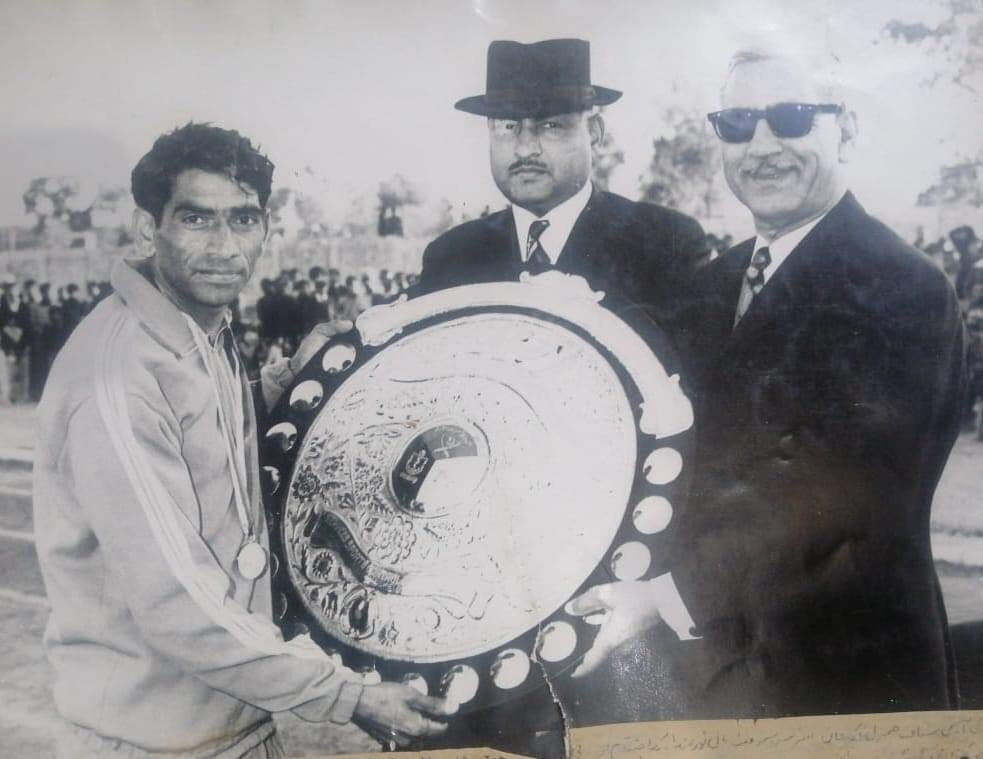
Tikka Khan distributing the Inter Services football trophy to Faqir in 1974

After retiring as player, Hussain served as coach of the Pakistan Airforce football team.

== Career statistics ==
=== International goals ===
Scores and results list Pakistan's goal tally first, score column indicates score after each Faqir goal.

List of international goals scored by Faqir Hussain
| No. | Date | Venue | Opponent | Score | Result | Competition | Ref. |
|---|---|---|---|---|---|---|---|
| 1 | 9 December 1959 | Maharaja's College Stadium, Ernakulam, India | Iran | 2–1 | 4–1 | 1960 AFC Asian Cup qualification | |
