= Bahadur Khan (referee) =

Pakistani football referee

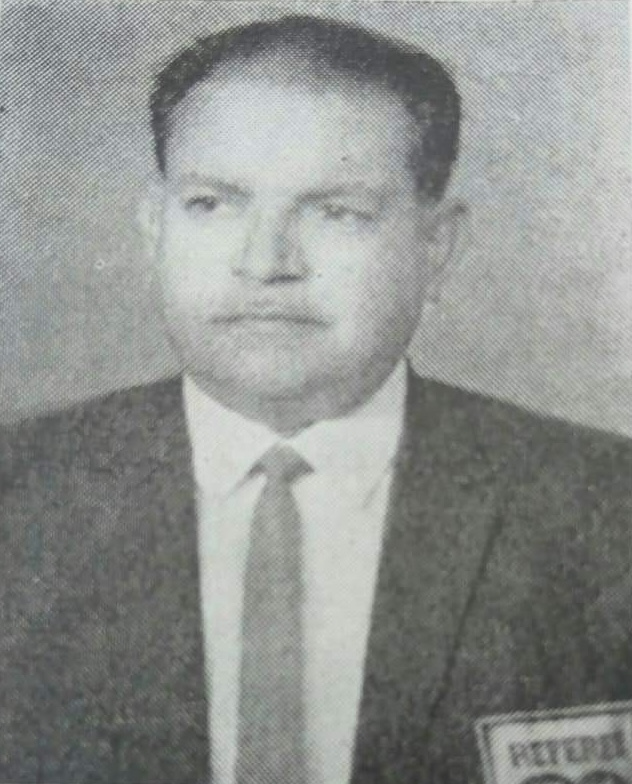
- Born: Karachi, British India

Domestic
Years	League	Role

International
Years	League	Role

Bahadur Khan (Urdu: بہادر خان) was a Pakistani FIFA football referee. He has been regarded as one of the most prominent football referees from Pakistan.

== Career ==
At domestic level, Khan refereed at the National Football Championship.

Khan was affiliated with FIFA as a referee. He refereed at the 1960 Merdeka Tournament, where he refereed a group stage match between South Korea and Indonesia, and the final between Malaya and South Korea.

He also refereed at the 1962 AFC Youth Championship. The same year, he published a book named "Pakistan Football" and presented it to the Malayan Prime Minister Tunku Abdul Rahman.

On 7 February 1963, Khan refereed the match between Pakistan and the touring China national team in Peshawar.

On 10 January 1969, Khan officiated the Tehran derby between Persepolis and Taj in the 1968–69 Tehran Tournament, the first instance of a foreign referee being appointed to the fixture.

He refereed the match between Iran and North Korea at the 1972 Summer Olympics Qualifiers.

== Post-retirement ==
After retirement as referee, Khan became chairman of the Pakistan Football Federation Referee Board.
