= Railway Stadium, Karachi =

Stadium in Karachi, Pakistan

Railway Stadium
- Interactive map of Railway Stadium
- Location: I. I. Chundrigar Road, Karachi, Sindh, Pakistan
- Coordinates: 24°51′3″N 67°0′41″E
- Owner: Pakistan Railways
- Surface: Natural Grass

Railway Stadium, also known as Railway Ground, is a railway-owned sports ground located on I. I. Chundrigar Road in Karachi, Pakistan. The land is owned by Pakistan Railways, and forms part of its urban property holdings in Karachi.

== Location ==
The ground is located on I. I. Chundrigar Road in Karachi, close to Pakistan Railways infrastructure around Karachi City railway station.

== History ==
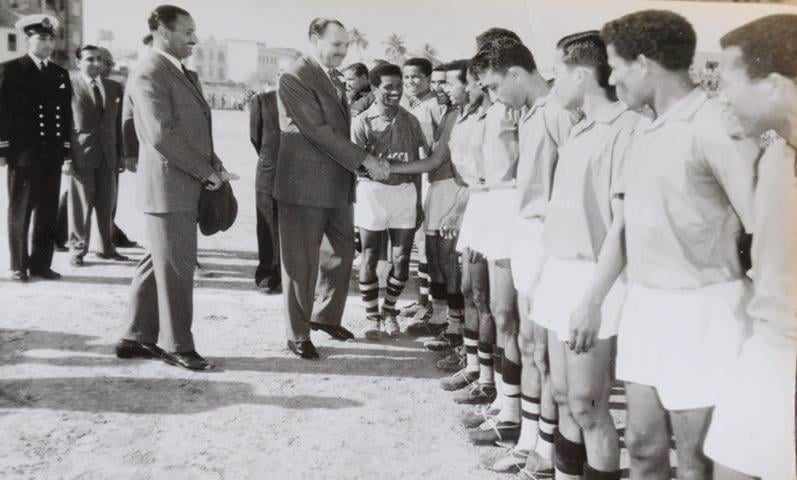
1961–62 National Football Championship final between Dacca Division and Karachi Blues at Railway Stadium

Railway Stadium has existed since at least the mid-20th century as a recreational and sporting facility for railway employees. Various editions of the National Football Championship were also held at the stadium.

By the early 2000s, it became a reference point in national debate over the leasing and commercial use of Pakistan Railways land. In 2005, Pakistan Railways publicly advertised the Railway Stadium land as part of proposed commercial leasing and development plans.

In 2014, federal officials announced plans to restore and revive the Railway Stadium as part of broader railway and urban development initiatives, though no permanent redevelopment was completed.

By 2025, the stadium was used mainly for private functions and weddings, and as a temporary parking facility.

== See also ==
- List of stadiums in Pakistan
