= Siah =

Siah may refer to:

- She (surname), a Chinese family name
- Siah (group), an Israeli left-wing group
- Siah, Iran, a village in Ardabil Province, Iran
- Siah Jamegan F.C., an Iranian football club

== People ==
- Siah Albison, British runner
- Siah Khan, Iranian record holder
- Siah and Yeshua DapoED, American hip hop duo

== See also ==
- Siah Siah (disambiguation)
- Siah Darreh (disambiguation)
- Siah Gel (disambiguation)
- Siah Kalan (disambiguation)
- Siah Kesh (disambiguation)
- Siah Kuh (disambiguation)
- Siah Rud (disambiguation)
- Siah Rudbar (disambiguation)
- SIADH (syndrome of inappropriate antidiuretic hormone)
