= Komadul =

Komadul كمادول
- Village
- Location within Iran
- Coordinates: 37°10′31″N 49°08′19″E
- Country: Iran
- Province: Gilan
- County: Fuman
- Bakhsh: Sardar-e Jangal
- Rural District: Sardar-e Jangal

Population (2016)
  - Total: 177
- Time zone: UTC+3:30 (IRST)

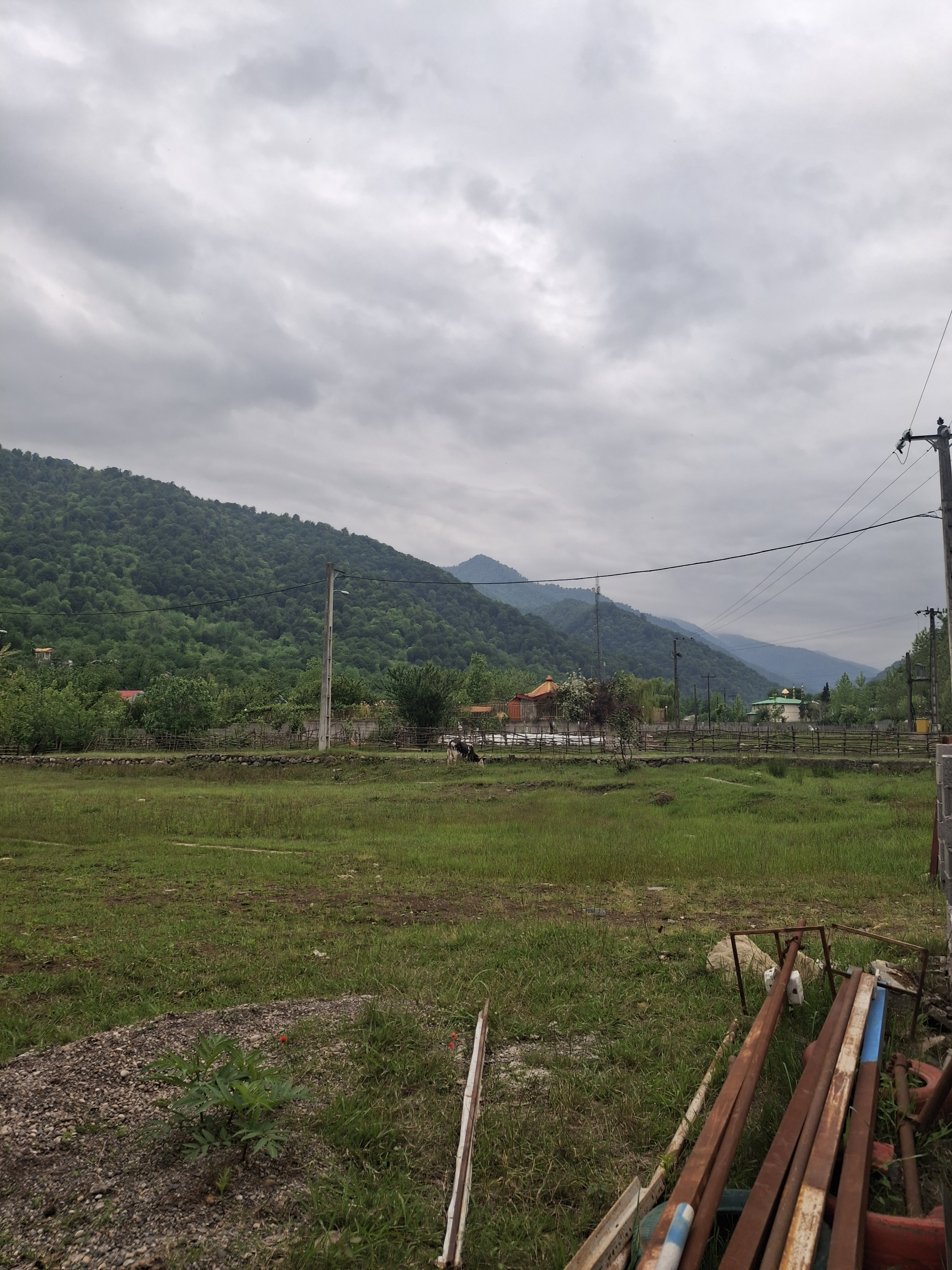
Komadul landscape

Komadul (Persian: كمادول, also Romanized as Komādūl; also known as Kamādel) is a village in Sardar-e Jangal Rural District, Sardar-e Jangal District, Fuman County, Gilan Province, Iran. It's on the road between Fuman and Masuleh.

At the time of the 2006 National Census, the village's population was 205 in 59 households. The following census in 2011 counted 191 people in 60 households. The 2016 census measured the population of the village as 177 people in 66 households.
