= Siah Darreh =

Siah Darreh or Siyah Darreh or Seyah Darreh (Persian: سياه دره) may refer to:

- Siah Darreh 1, Lorestan Province
- Siah Darreh 2, Lorestan Province
- Siah Darreh 3, Lorestan Province
- Siah Darreh, Hamadan
- Siah Darreh-ye Olya, Hamadan Province
- Siah Darreh, Kermanshah
- Siah Darreh, Kurdistan
- Seyah Darreh, Sistan and Baluchestan
- Siah Darreh, South Khorasan
- Siah Darreh, Tehran
