= Anjil-e Boneh =

Anjil-e Boneh انجيل بنه
- Village
- Location within Iran
- Coordinates: 37°10′53″N 49°06′14″E
- Country: Iran
- Province: Gilan
- County: Fuman
- Bakhsh: Sardar-e Jangal
- Rural District: Sardar-e Jangal

Population (2006)
  - Total: 13
- Time zone: UTC+3:30 (IRST)
  - Summer (DST): UTC+4:30 (IRDT)

Anjil-e Boneh (Persian: انجيل بنه, also Romanized as Anjīl-e Boneh and Anjīl Beneh) is a village in Sardar-e Jangal Rural District, Sardar-e Jangal District, Fuman County, Gilan Province, Iran. At the 2006 census, its population was 13, in 5 families.
