= Razi Nesa =

Razi Nesa رضي نسا
- Village
- Location within Iran
- Coordinates: 37°08′48″N 49°07′51″E
- Country: Iran
- Province: Gilan
- County: Fuman
- Bakhsh: Sardar-e Jangal
- Rural District: Sardar-e Jangal

Population (2006)
  - Total: 16
- Time zone: UTC+3:30 (IRST)
  - Summer (DST): UTC+4:30 (IRDT)

Razi Nesa (Persian: رضي نسا, also Romanized as Raẕī Nesā and Razī Nesā) is a village in Sardar-e Jangal Rural District, Sardar-e Jangal District, Fuman County, Gilan Province, Iran. At the 2006 census, its population was 16, in 5 families.
