= Kalarm =

Village in Gilan province, Iran

Kalarm Persian: كلرم
- Village
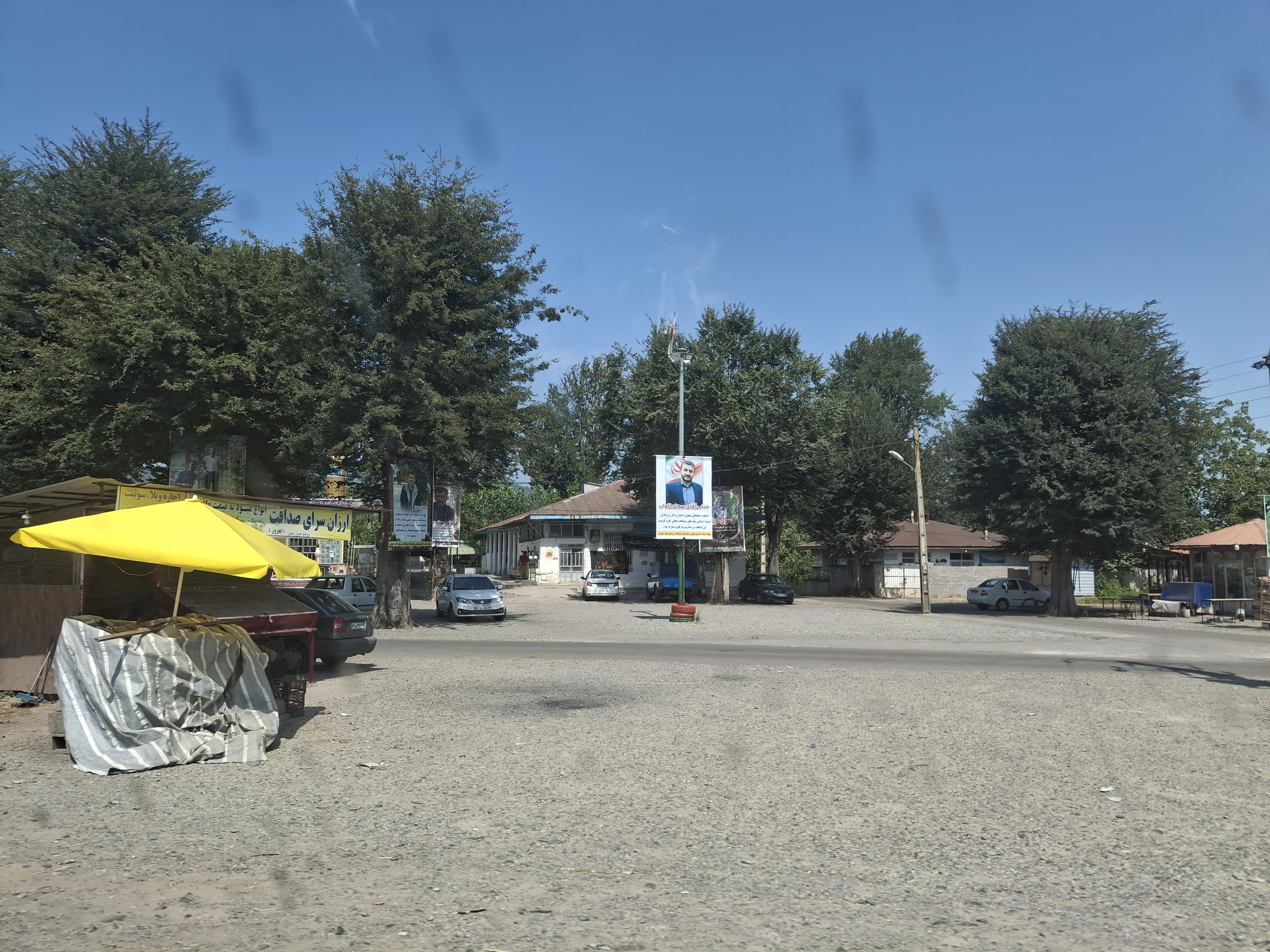
- The village of Kalarm

- Location within Iran
- Coordinates: 37°12′07″N 49°12′54″E
- Country: Iran
- Province: Gilan
- County: Fuman
- District: Sardar-e Jangal
- Rural District: Sardar-e Jangal

Population (2016)
  - Total: 789
- Time zone: UTC+3:30 (IRST)

Kalarm (Persian: كلرم) (Note: Also romanized as Kalāram, Kolarm, and Kolram) is a village in Sardar-e Jangal Rural District of Sardar-e Jangal District in Fuman County, Gilan province, Iran.

== Demographics ==
=== Population ===
At the time of the 2006 National Census, the village's population was 945 in 241 households. The following census in 2011 counted 805 people in 244 households. The 2016 census measured the population of the village as 789 people in 266 households.

=== Geography ===
Kalarm lies about 9 km west of the city of Fuman, the county capital.[1] The neighbouring village of Kuchi Chal is about 1 km to the southwest.

== Attractions ==
Nearby sites include Masuleh, 15km, and Rudkhan Castle, 23km.
