= Siabkun =

Siabkun سيابكون
- Village
- Location within Iran
- Coordinates: 37°09′07″N 48°57′25″E
- Country: Iran
- Province: Gilan
- County: Fuman
- Bakhsh: Sardar-e Jangal
- Rural District: Sardar-e Jangal

Population (2006)
  - Total: 75
- Time zone: UTC+3:30 (IRST)
  - Summer (DST): UTC+4:30 (IRDT)

Siabkun (Persian: سيابكون, also Romanized as Sīābkūn) is a village in Sardar-e Jangal Rural District, Sardar-e Jangal District, Fuman County, Gilan Province, Iran. At the 2006 census, its population was 75, in 20 families.
