= Molla Bagh =

Molla Bagh ملاباغ
- Village
- Location within Iran
- Coordinates: 37°08′52″N 49°01′27″E
- Country: Iran
- Province: Gilan
- County: Fuman
- Bakhsh: Sardar-e Jangal
- Rural District: Sardar-e Jangal

Population (2006)
  - Total: 45
- Time zone: UTC+3:30 (IRST)
  - Summer (DST): UTC+4:30 (IRDT)

Molla Bagh (Persian: ملاباغ, also Romanized as Mollā Bāgh) is a village in Sardar-e Jangal Rural District, Sardar-e Jangal District, Fuman County, Gilan Province, Iran. At the 2006 census, its population was 45, in 10 families.
