= Zardeh Lajeh =

Zardeh Lajeh زردلجه
- Village
- Location within Iran
- Coordinates: 37°10′34″N 49°05′43″E
- Country: Iran
- Province: Gilan
- County: Fuman
- Bakhsh: Sardar-e Jangal
- Rural District: Sardar-e Jangal

Population (2006)
  - Total: 89
- Time zone: UTC+3:30 (IRST)
  - Summer (DST): UTC+4:30 (IRDT)

Zardeh Lajeh (Persian: زردلجه; also known as Zard-e Līcheh) is a village in Sardar-e Jangal Rural District, Sardar-e Jangal District, Fuman County, Gilan Province, Iran. At the 2006 census, its population was 89, in 24 families.
