= Tuseh Kaleh =

Village in Gilan province, Iran

Tuseh Kaleh Persian: توسه كله
- Village
- Location within Iran
- Coordinates: 37°15′54″N 49°10′25″E
- Country: Iran
- Province: Gilan
- County: Fuman
- District: Sardar-e Jangal
- Rural District: Aliyan

Population (2016)
  - Total: 389
- Time zone: UTC+3:30 (IRST)

Tuseh Kaleh (Persian: توسه كله) (Note: Also romanized as Tūseh Kaleh and Tūseh Kelh; also known as Tusakhilya) is a village in Aliyan Rural District of Sardar-e Jangal District in Fuman County, Gilan province, Iran.

== Demographics ==
=== Population ===
At the time of the 2006 National Census, the village's population was 580 in 145 households. The following census in 2011 counted 436 people in 140 households. The 2016 census measured the population of the village as 389 people in 132 households.
