= Sardar-e Jangal =

Sardar-e Jangal (Persian: سردار جنگل) may refer to:

- Sardar-e Jangal District
- Sardar-e Jangal Rural District
