= Shirzeyl =

Village in Gilan province, Iran

Shirzeyl Persian: شيرذيل
- Village
- Location within Iran
- Coordinates: 37°12′38″N 49°14′25″E
- Country: Iran
- Province: Gilan
- County: Fuman
- District: Sardar-e Jangal
- Rural District: Sardar-e Jangal

Population (2016)
  - Total: 419
- Time zone: UTC+3:30 (IRST)

Shirzeyl (Persian: شيرذيل) (Note: Also romanized as Shīrz̄eyl) is a village in Sardar-e Jangal Rural District of Sardar-e Jangal District in Fuman County, Gilan province, Iran.

== Demographics ==
=== Population ===
At the time of the 2006 National Census, the village's population was 446 in 127 households. The following census in 2011 counted 572 people in 141 households. The 2016 census measured the population of the village as 419 people in 152 households.
