= Palang Darreh, Fuman =

Village in Gilan province, Iran

Palang Darreh Persian: پلنگدره
- Village
- Location within Iran
- Coordinates: 37°16′04″N 49°09′16″E
- Country: Iran
- Province: Gilan
- County: Fuman
- District: Sardar-e Jangal
- Rural District: Aliyan

Population (2016)
  - Total: 227
- Time zone: UTC+3:30 (IRST)

Palang Darreh (Persian: پلنگدره) is a village in Aliyan Rural District of Sardar-e Jangal District in Fuman County, Gilan province, Iran.

== Demographics ==
=== Population ===
At the time of the 2006 National Census, the village's population was 300 in 77 households. The following census in 2011 counted 280 people in 86 households. The 2016 census measured the population of the village as 227 people in 78 households.
