= Abrud, Gilan =

Village in Gilan province, Iran

Abrud Persian: ابرود
- Village
- Location within Iran
- Coordinates: 37°10′13″N 49°10′29″E
- Country: Iran
- Province: Gilan
- County: Fuman
- District: Sardar-e Jangal
- Rural District: Sardar-e Jangal

Population (2016)
  - Total: 614
- Time zone: UTC+3:30 (IRST)

Abrud (Persian: ابرود) (Note: Also romanized as Ābrūd) is a village in Sardar-e Jangal Rural District of Sardar-e Jangal District in Fuman County, Gilan province, Iran.

== Demographics ==
=== Population ===
At the time of the 2006 National Census, the village's population was 776 in 202 households. The following census in 2011 counted 759 people in 211 households. The 2016 census measured the population of the village as 614 people in 198 households.
