= Tataf Rud =

Village in Gilan province, Iran

Tataf Rud Persian: تطفرود
- Village
- Location within Iran
- Coordinates: 37°15′26″N 49°10′40″E
- Country: Iran
- Province: Gilan
- County: Fuman
- District: Sardar-e Jangal
- Rural District: Aliyan

Population (2016)
  - Total: 337
- Time zone: UTC+3:30 (IRST)

Tataf Rud (Persian: تطفرود) (Note: Also romanized as Taţaf Rūd; also known as Taţaf Rūd-e Ālīān, and Tatavrut) is a village in Aliyan Rural District of Sardar-e Jangal District in Fuman County, Gilan province, Iran.

== Demographics ==
=== Population ===
At the time of the 2006 National Census, the village's population was 373 in 103 households. The following census in 2011 counted 320 people in 100 households. The 2016 census measured the population of the village as 337 people in 116 households.
