= Zideh =

Zideh (Persian: زيده) may refer to:

- Zideh-ye Bala
- Zideh-ye Pain
- Zideh, Tajikistan
