= Gav Kuh =

Gav Kuh گاوكوه
- Village
- Location within Iran
- Coordinates: 37°13′43″N 49°08′49″E
- Country: Iran
- Province: Gilan
- County: Fuman
- Bakhsh: Sardar-e Jangal
- Rural District: Aliyan

Population (2016)
  - Total: 98
- Time zone: UTC+3:30 (IRST)

Gav Kuh (Persian: گاوكوه, also Romanized as Gāv Kūh and Gāvkūh) is a village in Aliyan Rural District, Sardar-e Jangal District, Fuman County, Gilan Province, Iran.

At the time of the 2006 National Census, the village's population was 81 in 25 households. The following census in 2011 counted 88 people in 28 households. The 2016 census measured the population of the village as 98 people in 35 households.
