= Kolta Sar =

Kolta Sar كلتاسر
- Village
- Location within Iran
- Coordinates: 37°12′47″N 49°09′52″E
- Country: Iran
- Province: Gilan
- County: Fuman
- Bakhsh: Sardar-e Jangal
- Rural District: Aliyan

Population (2016)
  - Total: 103
- Time zone: UTC+3:30 (IRST)

Kolta Sar (Persian: كلتاسر, also Romanized as Koltā Sar; also known as Koltān Sar) is a village in Aliyan Rural District, Sardar-e Jangal District, Fuman County, Gilan Province, Iran.

At the time of the 2006 National Census, the village's population was 160 in 35 households. The following census in 2011 counted 127 people in 37 households. The 2016 census measured the population of the village as 103 people in 29 households.
