= Jirdeh, Fuman =

Village in Gilan province, Iran

Jirdeh Persian: جيرده
- Village
- Location within Iran
- Coordinates: 37°13′49″N 49°08′20″E
- Country: Iran
- Province: Gilan
- County: Fuman
- District: Sardar-e Jangal
- Rural District: Aliyan

Population (2016)
  - Total: 206
- Time zone: UTC+3:30 (IRST)

Jirdeh (Persian: جيرده) (Note: Also romanized as Jīrdeh; also known as Jīrdeh-e Pā‘īn) is a village in Aliyan Rural District of Sardar-e Jangal District in Fuman County, Gilan province, Iran.

== Demographics ==
=== Population ===
At the time of the 2006 National Census, the village's population was 239 in 59 households. The following census in 2011 counted 205 people in 63 households. The 2016 census measured the population of the village as 206 people in 67 households.
