= Kuchi Chal =

Village in Gilan province, Iran

Kuchi Chal Persian: كوچي چال
- Village
- Location within Iran
- Coordinates: 37°11′50″N 49°12′19″E
- Country: Iran
- Province: Gilan
- County: Fuman
- District: Sardar-e Jangal
- Rural District: Sardar-e Jangal

Population (2016)
  - Total: 332
- Time zone: UTC+3:30 (IRST)

Kuchi Chal (Persian: كوچي چال) (Note: Also romanized as Kūchī Chāl; also known as Kūcheh Chāl) is a village in Sardar-e Jangal Rural District of Sardar-e Jangal District in Fuman County, Gilan province, Iran.

== Demographics ==
=== Population ===
At the time of the 2006 National Census, the village's population was 484 in 137 households. The following census in 2011 counted 391 people in 120 households. The 2016 census measured the population of the village as 332 people in 109 households.
