= Latin Pard =

Latin Pard لتين پرد
- Village
- Location within Iran
- Coordinates: 37°15′45″N 49°07′40″E
- Country: Iran
- Province: Gilan
- County: Fuman
- Bakhsh: Sardar-e Jangal
- Rural District: Aliyan

Population (2016)
  - Total: 100
- Time zone: UTC+3:30 (IRST)

Latin Pard (Persian: لتين پرد, also Romanized as Latīn Pard; also known as Latīmpūrd and Latīn Part) is a village in Aliyan Rural District, Sardar-e Jangal District, Fuman County, Gilan Province, Iran.

At the time of the 2006 National Census, the village's population was 64 in 16 households. The following census in 2011 counted 63 people in 18 households. The 2016 census measured the population of the village as 100 people in 30 households.
