= Fouman =

Fouman may refer to:

- Fuman County, a county in Gilan Province, Iran
- Fuman, Iran, a city in Gilan Province, Iran
