= Mishkeh =

Mishkeh (Persian: ميشكه) may refer to:

- Mishkeh, Gilan
- Mishkeh, Khuzestan
