= Khaneh Vaneh =

Village in Gilan province, Iran

Khaneh Vaneh Persian: خانه وانه
- Village
- Location within Iran
- Coordinates: 37°12′32″N 49°12′08″E
- Country: Iran
- Province: Gilan
- County: Fuman
- District: Sardar-e Jangal
- Rural District: Sardar-e Jangal

Population (2016)
  - Total: 508
- Time zone: UTC+3:30 (IRST)

Khaneh Vaneh (Persian: خانه وانه) (Note: Also romanized as Khāneh Vāneh; also known as Khana-Vona and Khānevāneh) is a village in Sardar-e Jangal Rural District of Sardar-e Jangal District in Fuman County, Gilan province, Iran.

== Demographics ==
=== Population ===
At the time of the 2006 National Census, the village's population was 575 in 154 households. The following census in 2011 counted 488 people in 162 households. The 2016 census measured the population of the village as 508 people in 170 households.
