= Musa Kuh =

Musa Kuh موسي كوه
- Village
- Location within Iran
- Coordinates: 37°15′10″N 49°07′40″E
- Country: Iran
- Province: Gilan
- County: Fuman
- Bakhsh: Sardar-e Jangal
- Rural District: Aliyan

Population (2016)
  - Total: 72
- Time zone: UTC+3:30 (IRST)

Musa Kuh (Persian: موسي كوه, also Romanized as Mūsá Kūh) is a village in Aliyan Rural District, Sardar-e Jangal District, Fuman County, Gilan Province, Iran.

At the time of the 2006 National Census, the village's population was 135 in 34 households. The following census in 2011 counted 125 people in 35 households. The 2016 census measured the population of the village as 72 people in 24 households.
