= Aghuz Kaleh =

Aghuz Kaleh or Aghuz Keleh or Aghuz Kalleh (Persian: اغوزكله) may refer to:

- Aghuz Keleh, Fuman, Gilan Province
- Aghuz Kalleh, Rudsar, Gilan Province
- Aghuz Kaleh, Mazandaran
