= Shalash Darreh =

Shalash Darreh شلشه دره
- Village
- Location within Iran
- Coordinates: 37°11′34″N 49°09′31″E
- Country: Iran
- Province: Gilan
- County: Fuman
- Bakhsh: Sardar-e Jangal
- Rural District: Aliyan

Population (2016)
  - Total: 141
- Time zone: UTC+3:30 (IRST)

Shalash Darreh (Persian: شلشه دره, also Romanized as Shalāsh Darreh and Shālesh Darreh) is a village in Aliyan Rural District, Sardar-e Jangal District, Fuman County, Gilan Province, Iran.

At the time of the 2006 National Census, the village's population was 212. The following census in 2011 counted 162 people in 51 households. The 2016 census measured the population of the village as 141 people in 51 households.
