= Teymur Kuh =

Teymur Kuh تيموركوه
- Village
- Location within Iran
- Coordinates: 37°14′46″N 49°11′45″E
- Country: Iran
- Province: Gilan
- County: Fuman
- Bakhsh: Sardar-e Jangal
- Rural District: Aliyan

Population (2016)
  - Total: 193
- Time zone: UTC+3:30 (IRST)

Teymur Kuh (Persian: تيموركوه, also Romanized as Teymūr Kūh) is a village in Aliyan Rural District, Sardar-e Jangal District, Fuman County, Gilan Province, Iran.

At the time of the 2006 National Census, the village's population was 212 in 55 households. The following census in 2011 counted 192 people in 60 households. The 2016 census measured the population of the village as 193 people in 67 households.
