= Kish Darreh =

Village in Gilan province, Iran

Kish Darreh Persian: كيش دره
- Village
- Location within Iran
- Coordinates: 37°15′28″N 49°08′40″E
- Country: Iran
- Province: Gilan
- County: Fuman
- District: Sardar-e Jangal
- Rural District: Aliyan

Population (2016)
  - Total: 270
- Time zone: UTC+3:30 (IRST)

Kish Darreh (Persian: كيش دره) (Note: Also romanized as Kīsh Darreh; also known as Kīsheh Darreh, and Salīn Gash) is a village in Aliyan Rural District of Sardar-e Jangal District in Fuman County, Gilan province, Iran.

== Demographics ==
=== Population ===
At the time of the 2006 National Census, the village's population was 362 in 90 households. The following census in 2011 counted 297 people in 90 households. The 2016 census measured the population of the village as 270 people in 96 households.
