= Siah Kesh =

Siah Kesh (Persian: سياه كش) may refer to:

- Siah Kesh, Fuman
- Siah Kesh, Sardar-e Jangal, Fuman County
- Siah Kesh, Siahkalrud, Rudsar County
