= Masjed Pish =

Masjed Pish مسجدپيش
- Village
- Location within Iran
- Coordinates: 37°14′37″N 49°10′01″E
- Country: Iran
- Province: Gilan
- County: Fuman
- Bakhsh: Sardar-e Jangal
- Rural District: Aliyan

Population (2016)
  - Total: 90
- Time zone: UTC+3:30 (IRST)

Masjed Pish (Persian: مسجدپيش, also Romanized as Masjed Pīsh) is a village in Aliyan Rural District, Sardar-e Jangal District, Fuman County, Gilan Province, Iran.

At the time of the 2006 National Census, the village's population was 109. The following census in 2011 counted 99 people in 33 households. The 2016 census measured the population of the village as 90 people in 38 households.
