= Aghuz Keleh, Fuman =

Aghuz Keleh آغوزكله
- Village
- Location within Iran
- Coordinates: 37°08′35″N 49°03′07″E
- Country: Iran
- Province: Gilan
- County: Fuman
- Bakhsh: Sardar-e Jangal
- Rural District: Sardar-e Jangal

Population (2011)
  - Total: 13
- Time zone: UTC+3:30 (IRST)

Aghuz Keleh (Persian: آغوزكله, also Romanized as Āghūz Keleh) is a village in Sardar-e Jangal Rural District, Sardar-e Jangal District, Fuman County, Gilan Province, Iran.

At the time of the 2006 National Census, the village's population was 14 in 4 households. The following census in 2011 counted 13 people in 4 households. The 2016 census measured less than 4 households.
