= Kuryeh =

Kuryeh كوريه
- Village
- Location within Iran
- Coordinates: 37°12′45″N 49°07′44″E
- Country: Iran
- Province: Gilan
- County: Fuman
- Bakhsh: Sardar-e Jangal
- Rural District: Aliyan

Population (2016)
  - Total: 101
- Time zone: UTC+3:30 (IRST)

Kuryeh (Persian: كوريه, also Romanized as Kūryeh) is a village in Aliyan Rural District, Sardar-e Jangal District, Fuman County, Gilan Province, Iran.

At the time of the 2006 National Census, the village's population was 158 in 39 households. The following census in 2011 counted 106 people in 32 households. The 2016 census measured the population of the village as 101 people in 34 households.
