= Abbas Kuh =

Village in Gilan province, Iran

Abbas Kuh Persian: عباسكوه
- Village
- Location within Iran
- Coordinates: 37°14′36″N 49°09′52″E
- Country: Iran
- Province: Gilan
- County: Fuman
- District: Sardar-e Jangal
- Rural District: Aliyan

Population (2016)
  - Total: 354
- Time zone: UTC+3:30 (IRST)

Abbas Kuh (Persian: عباسكوه) (Note: Also romanized as ‘Abbās Kūh) is a village in Aliyan Rural District of Sardar-e Jangal District in Fuman County, Gilan province, Iran.

== Demographics ==
=== Population ===
At the time of the 2006 National Census, the village's population was 477 in 122 households. The following census in 2011 counted 405 people in 119 households. The 2016 census measured the population of the village as 354 people in 122 households.
