= Khajkeh =

Khajkeh خجكه
- Village
- Location within Iran
- Coordinates: 37°14′52″N 49°10′53″E
- Country: Iran
- Province: Gilan
- County: Fuman
- Bakhsh: Sardar-e Jangal
- Rural District: Aliyan

Population (2016)
  - Total: 154
- Time zone: UTC+3:30 (IRST)

Khajkeh (Persian: خجكه, also Romanized as Khejakeh) is a village in Aliyan Rural District, Sardar-e Jangal District, Fuman County, Gilan Province, Iran. At the 2006 census, its population was 194, in 49 families.

At the time of the 2006 National Census, the village's population was 194 in 49 households. The following census in 2011 counted 162 people in 49 households. The 2016 census measured the population of the village as 154 people in 52 households.
