= Gasgareh =

Village in Gilan province, Iran

Gasgareh Persian: گسگره
- Village
- Location within Iran
- Coordinates: 37°11′15″N 49°12′09″E
- Country: Iran
- Province: Gilan
- County: Fuman
- District: Sardar-e Jangal
- Rural District: Sardar-e Jangal

Population (2016)
  - Total: 477
- Time zone: UTC+3:30 (IRST)

Gasgareh (Persian: گسگره) (Note: Also known as Gaskara and Gaskareh) is a village in Sardar-e Jangal Rural District of Sardar-e Jangal District in Fuman County, Gilan province, Iran.

== Demographics ==
=== Population ===
At the time of the 2006 National Census, the village's population was 693 in 213 households. The following census in 2011 counted 587 people in 203 households. The 2016 census measured the population of the village as 477 people in 184 households.
