= Shapul Konar =

Shapul Konar شپول کنار
- Neighbourhood
- Interactive map of Shapul Konar
- Coordinates: 37.239°N 49.317°E
- Country: Iran
- Province: Gilan
- County: Fuman
- Bakhsh: Central
- City: Fuman

Population (2006)
  - Total: 136
- Time zone: UTC+3:30 (IRST)

Shapul Konar (Persian: شپول کنار, also Romanized as Shapūl Konār) is a neighborhood in the city of Fuman in Gilan Province, Iran, formerly a village in Rud Pish Rural District, in the Central District of Fuman County.

At the 2006 census, its population was 136, in 33 families. It was annexed by Fuman city after the census.
