= Sefid Sangan, Fuman =

Sefid Sangan سفيدسنگان
- Village
- Location within Iran
- Coordinates: 37°14′10″N 49°11′06″E
- Country: Iran
- Province: Gilan
- County: Fuman
- Bakhsh: Sardar-e Jangal
- Rural District: Aliyan

Population (2016)
  - Total: 14
- Time zone: UTC+3:30 (IRST)

Sefid Sangan (Persian: سفيدسنگان, also Romanized as Sefīd Sangān) is a village in Aliyan Rural District, Sardar-e Jangal District, Fuman County, Gilan Province, Iran.

At the time of the 2006 National Census, the village's population was 18 in 4 households. The following census in 2011 counted 12 people in 4 households. The 2016 census measured the population of the village as 14 people in 4 households.
