= Zideh-ye Pain =

Village in Gilan province, Iran

Zideh-ye Pain Persian: زيده پايين
- Village
- Location within Iran
- Coordinates: 37°13′39″N 49°13′12″E
- Country: Iran
- Province: Gilan
- County: Fuman
- District: Sardar-e Jangal
- Rural District: Sardar-e Jangal

Population (2016)
  - Total: 876
- Time zone: UTC+3:30 (IRST)

Zideh-ye Pain (Persian: زيده پايين) (Note: Also romanized as Zīdeh-ye Pā’īn) is a village in Sardar-e Jangal Rural District of Sardar-e Jangal District in Fuman County, Gilan province, Iran.

== Demographics ==
=== Population ===
At the time of the 2006 National Census, the village's population was 1,068 in 277 households. The following census in 2011 counted 999 people in 326 households. The 2016 census measured the population of the village as 876 people in 303 households. It was the most populous village in its rural district.
