= Maklavan-e Pain =

Neighborhood in Gilan province, Iran

Maklavan-e Pain Persian: ماكلوان پائين
- Neighborhood
- Location within Iran
- Country: Iran
- Province: Gilan
- County: Fuman
- District: Sardar-e Jangal
- City: Maklavan

Population (2011)
  - Total: 835
- Time zone: UTC+3:30 (IRST)

Maklavan-e Pain (Persian: ماكلوان پائين) (Note: Also romanized as Māklavān-e Pāeen and Māklavān-e Pā’īn) is a neighborhood in the city of Maklavan in Sardar-e Jangal District of Fuman County in Iran's northwestern Gilan province.

== Demographics ==
=== Population ===
At the time of the 2006 National Census, Maklavan-e Pain's population was 894 in 233 households, when it was a village in Sardar-e Jangal Rural District. The following census in 2011 counted 835 people in 254 households.

The village of Maklavan-e Bala merged with Maklavan-e Pain to become the city of Maklavan in 2012.
