= Mishkeh, Gilan =

Mishkeh ميشكه
- Village
- Location within Iran
- Coordinates: 37°14′11″N 49°06′40″E
- Country: Iran
- Province: Gilan
- County: Fuman
- Bakhsh: Sardar-e Jangal
- Rural District: Aliyan

Population (2016)
  - Total: 50
- Time zone: UTC+3:30 (IRST)

Mishkeh (Persian: ميشكه, also Romanized as Mīshkeh; also known as Mīsheh) is a village in Aliyan Rural District, Sardar-e Jangal District, Fuman County, Gilan Province, Iran.

At the time of the 2006 National Census, the village's population was 83 in 21 households. The following census in 2011 counted 65 people in 23 households. The 2016 census measured the population of the village as 50 people in 22 households.
