= Sefid Sangan =

Sefid Sangan (Persian: سفيدسنگان) may refer to:

- Sefid Sangan, Fuman
- Sefid Sangan, Talesh
