= Zideh-ye Bala =

Village in Gilan province, Iran

Zideh-ye Bala Persian: زيده بالا
- Village
- Location within Iran
- Coordinates: 37°13′15″N 49°12′37″E
- Country: Iran
- Province: Gilan
- County: Fuman
- District: Sardar-e Jangal
- Rural District: Sardar-e Jangal

Population (2016)
  - Total: 769
- Time zone: UTC+3:30 (IRST)

Zideh-ye Bala (Persian: زيده بالا) (Note: Also romanized as Zīdeh-ye Bālā) is a village in Sardar-e Jangal Rural District of Sardar-e Jangal District in Fuman County, Gilan province, Iran.

== Demographics ==
=== Population ===
At the time of the 2006 National Census, the village's population was 928 in 249 households. The following census in 2011 counted 895 people in 279 households. The 2016 census measured the population of the village as 769 people in 261 households.
