= Siah Rud (disambiguation) =

Siah Rud is a city in East Azerbaijan Province, Iran.

Siah Rud or Siyahrud or Siahrud (Persian: سياه رود) may also refer to:

- Siah Varud, Gilan province
- Shafa Rud, Gilan province
- Siah Rud Poshteh, Gilan province
- Siah Rud, Mazandaran
- Siyahvarud, Zanjan
- Siah Rud District, in East Azerbaijan Province
- Siyahrud Rural District (disambiguation)
