= Siah Varud =

Village in Gilan province, Iran

Siah Varud Persian: سياه ورود
- Village
- Location within Iran
- Coordinates: 37°15′32″N 49°09′51″E
- Country: Iran
- Province: Gilan
- County: Fuman
- District: Sardar-e Jangal
- Rural District: Aliyan

Population (2016)
  - Total: 478
- Time zone: UTC+3:30 (IRST)

Siah Varud (Persian: سياه ورود) (Note: Also romanized as Sīāh Varūd and Sīāhvarūd; also known as Sīāh Ve Rūd, Sevavarut, Sīāveh Rūd, and Seyāh Ābrūd) is a village in, and the capital of, Aliyan Rural District in Sardar-e Jangal District of Fuman County, Gilan province, Iran.

== Demographics ==
=== Population ===
At the time of the 2006 National Census, the village's population was 712 in 177 households. The following census in 2011 counted 570 people in 181 households. The 2016 census measured the population of the village as 478 people in 170 households. It was the most populous village in its rural district.
