= Maklavan =

City in Gilan province, Iran

Maklavan Persian: ماکلوان
- City
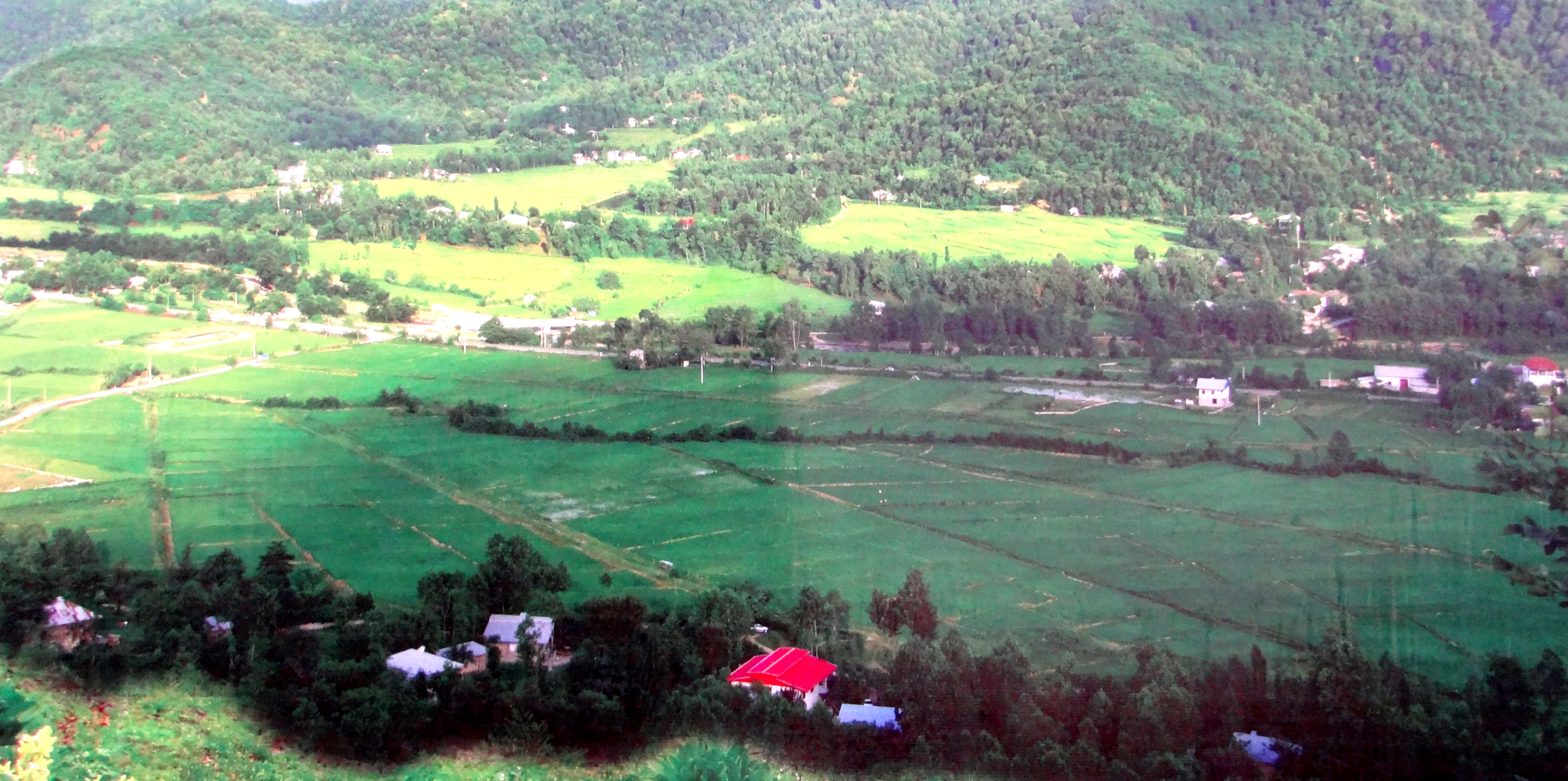

- Location within Iran
- Coordinates: 37°11′42″N 49°11′46″E
- Country: Iran
- Province: Gilan
- County: Fuman
- District: Sardar-e Jangal

Population (2016 Census)
  - Total: 1,635
- Time zone: UTC+3:30 (IRST)

Maklavan (Persian: ماکلوان) (Note: Also known as Mākalān; formerly the village of Maklavan-e Bala) is a city in, and the capital of, Sardar-e Jangal District of Fuman County, in Iran's northwestern Gilan province. It also serves as the administrative center for Sardar-e Jangal Rural District.

== Demographics ==
=== Population ===
At the time of the 2006 National Census, the population was 796 in 209 households, when it was the village of Maklavan-e Bala in Sardar-e Jangal Rural District. The following census in 2011 counted 872 people in 254 households.

Maklavan-e Bala merged with the village of Maklavan-e Pain to become the city of Maklavan in 2012. The 2016 census measured the city's population as 1,635 people in 536 households.

== Gallery ==
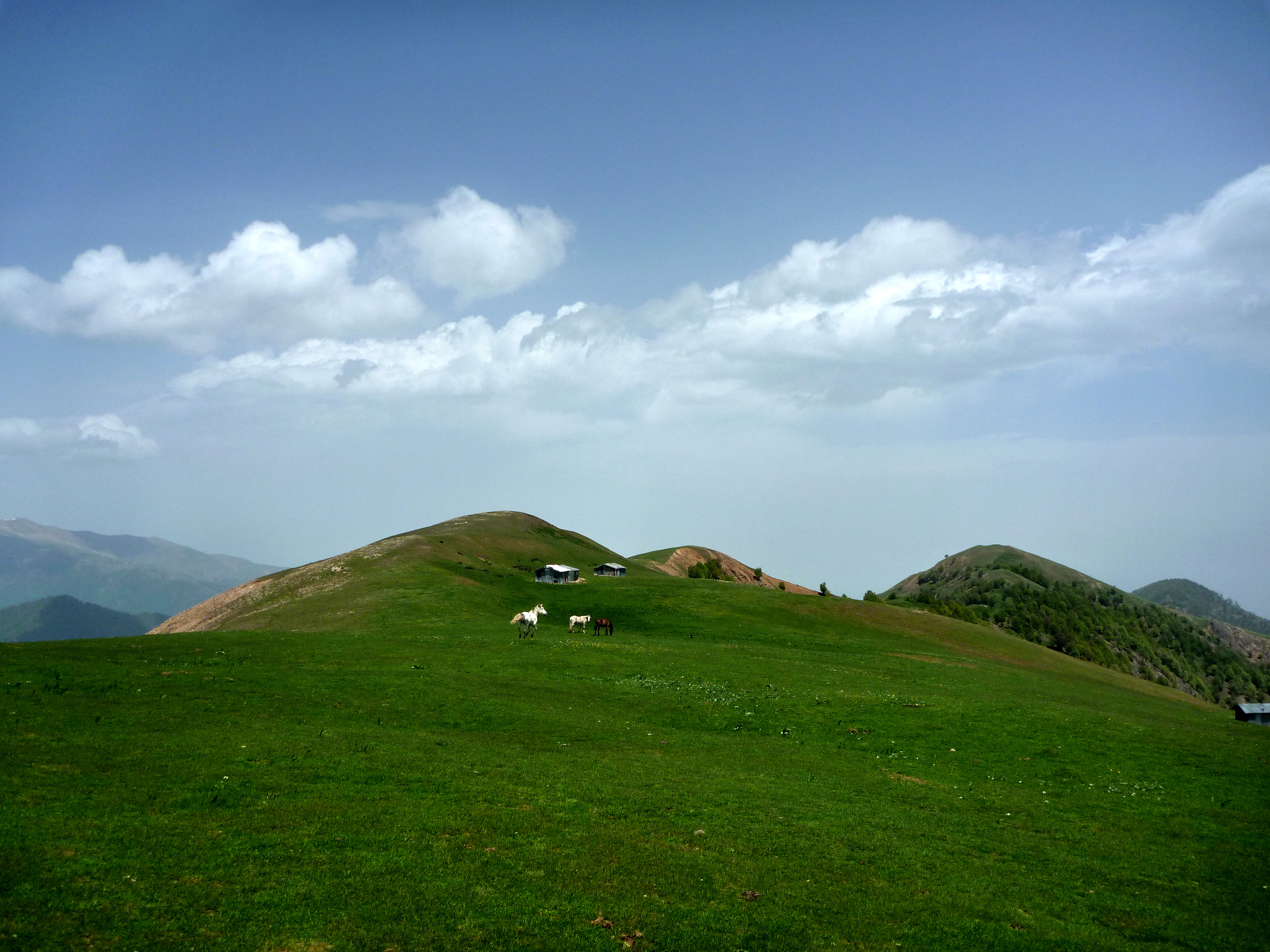

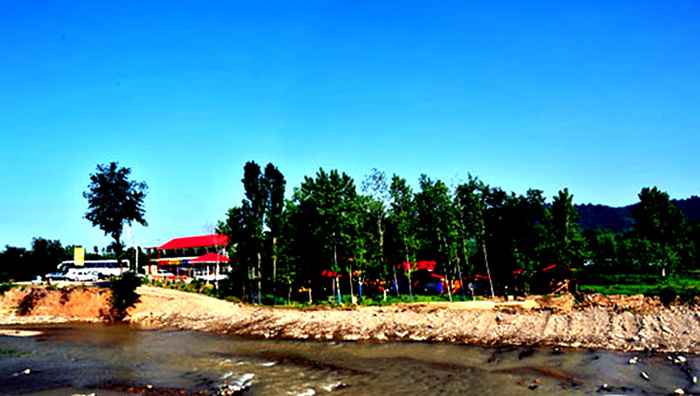

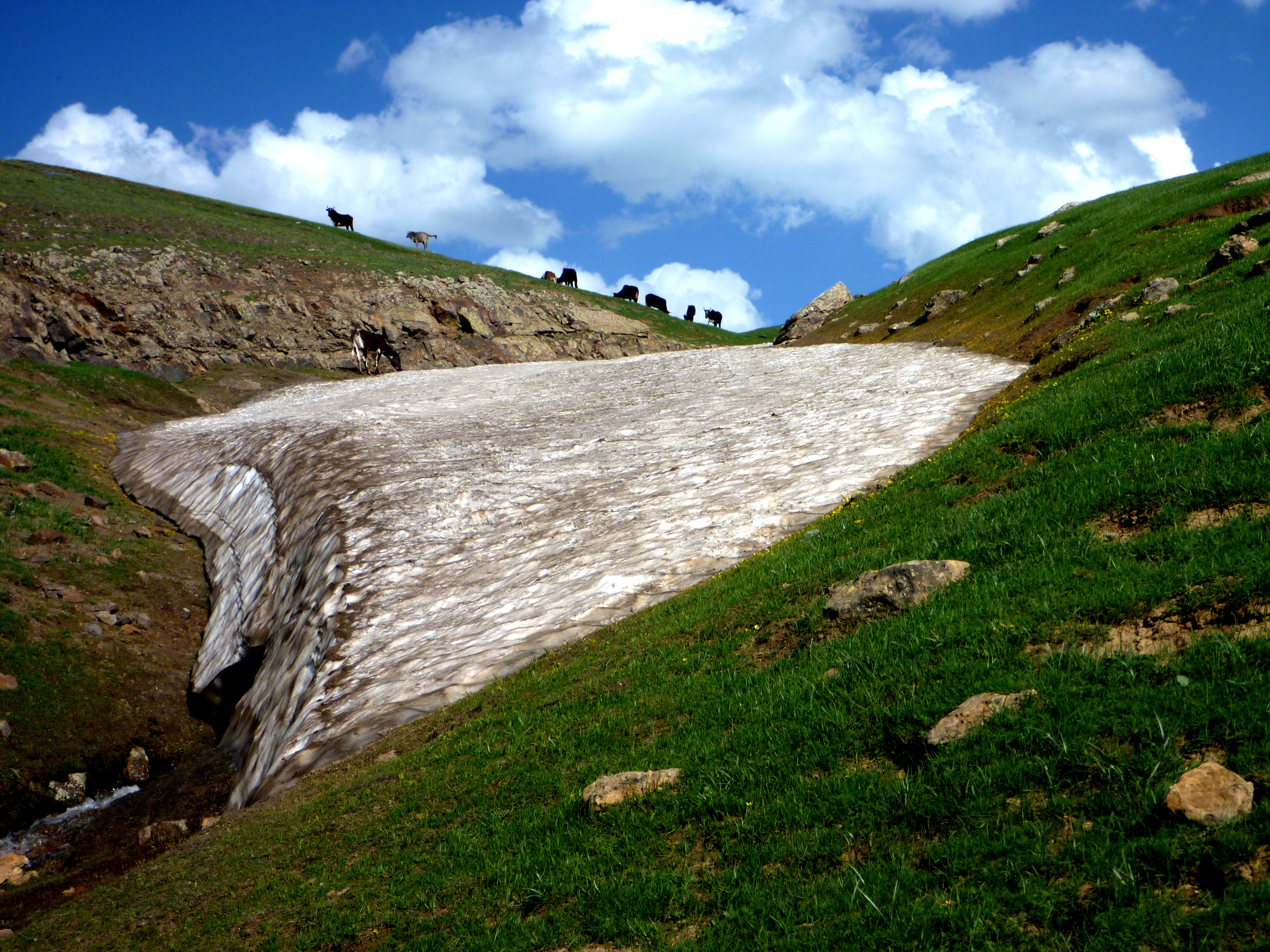

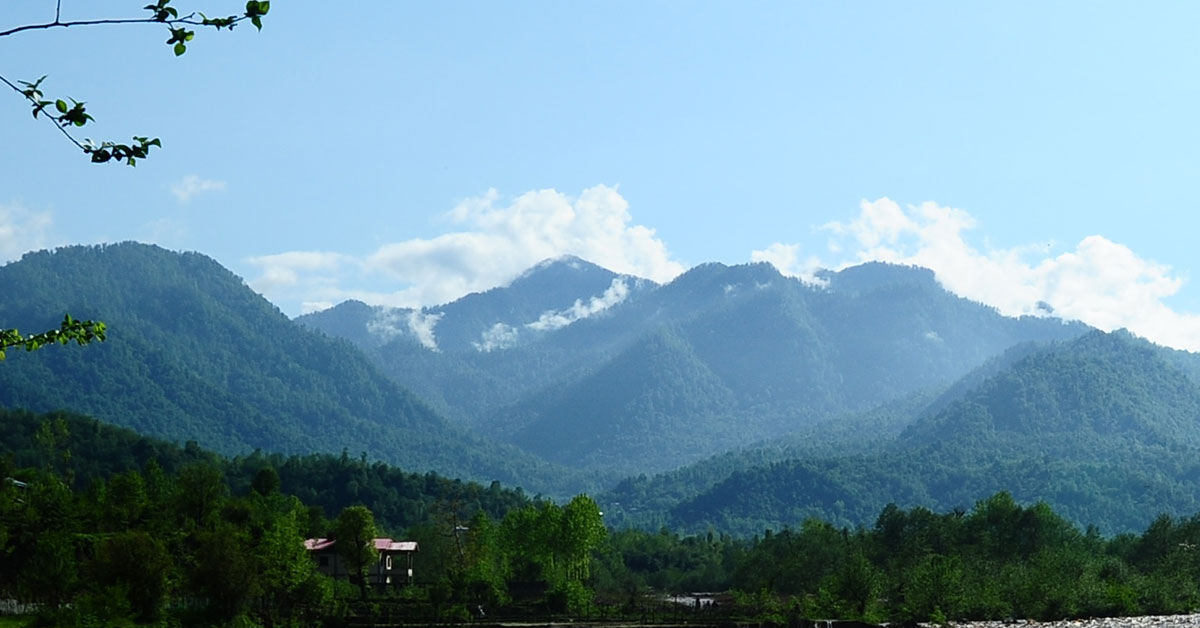

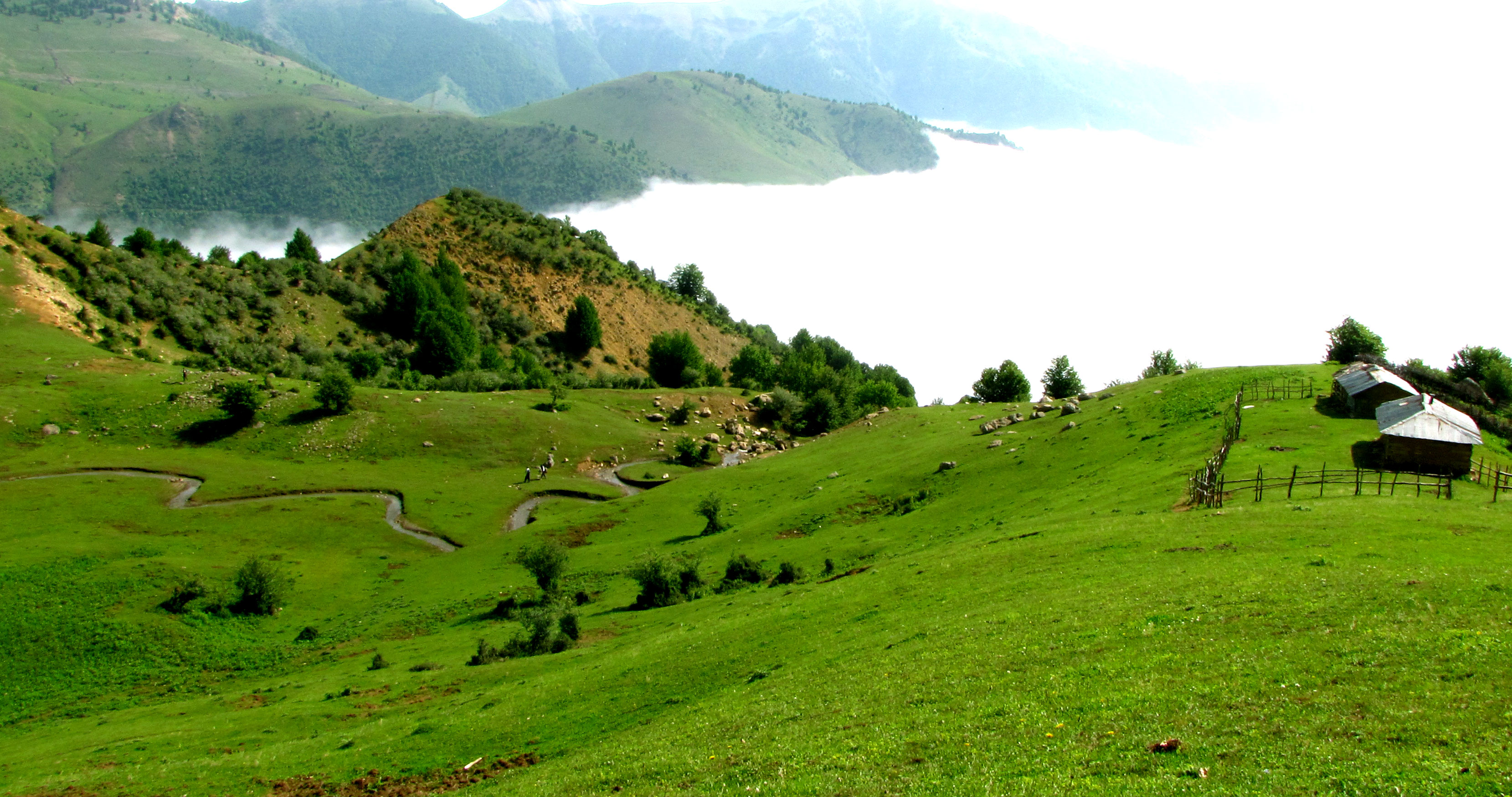
