= Jafar Shojouni =

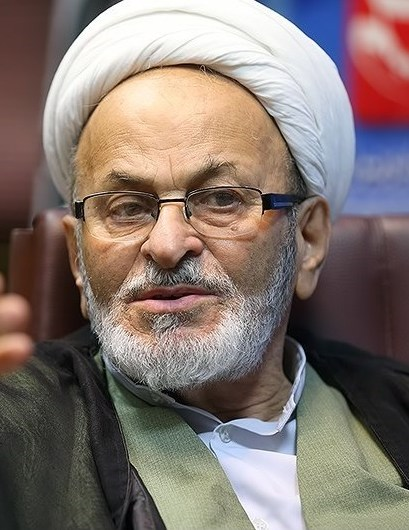

Member of the Parliament of Iran
- In office 28 May 1980 – 28 May 1984
- Constituency: Karaj
- Majority: 279,302 (24.79%)

Personal details
- Born: Jafar Javad Shojouni c. 1932 Fuman, Iran
- Died: November 6, 2016 (aged 84) Tehran, Iran
- Cause of death: Heart disease
- Party: Islamic Coalition Party; Combatant Clergy Association

Jafar Shojouni (Persian: جعفر شجونی) was an Iranian Shia cleric and conservative politician who served a member of the Parliament of Iran from 1980 to 1984, representing Karaj. He was a member of Islamic Coalition Party’s Central Council, as well as the Combatant Clergy Association. He was also associated with Fada'iyan-e Islam.
