= Siah Kesh, Fuman =

Siah Kesh سياه كش
- Village
- Location within Iran
- Coordinates: 37°09′34″N 49°17′19″E
- Country: Iran
- Province: Gilan
- County: Fuman
- Bakhsh: Central
- Rural District: Gurab Pas

Population (2006)
  - Total: 170
- Time zone: UTC+3:30 (IRST)
  - Summer (DST): UTC+4:30 (IRDT)

Siah Kesh (Persian: سياه كش, also Romanized as Sīāh Kesh) is a village in Gurab Pas Rural District, in the Central District of Fuman County, Gilan Province, Iran. At the 2006 census, its population was 170, in 47 families.
