= Aliyan Rural District =

Rural district in Gilan province, Iran

Aliyan Rural District Persian: دهستان آليان
- Rural District
- Location within Iran
- Coordinates: 37°15′N 49°06′E
- Country: Iran
- Province: Gilan
- County: Fuman
- District: Sardar-e Jangal
- Established: 1987
- Capital: Siah Varud

Population (2016)
  - Total: 3,379
- Time zone: UTC+3:30 (IRST)

Aliyan Rural District (Persian: دهستان آليان) is in Sardar-e Jangal District of Fuman County, Gilan province, Iran. Its capital is the village of Siah Varud.

== Demographics ==
=== Population ===
At the time of the 2006 National Census, the rural district's population was 4,474 in 1,146 households. There were 3,719 inhabitants in 1,151 households at the following census of 2011. The 2016 census recorded the population as 3,379 in 1,168 households. The most populous of its 19 villages, Siah Varud, with 478 people, is also the capital of the rural district.

=== Other villages in the rural district ===
- Abbas Kuh
- Gav Kuh
- Jirdeh
- Khajkeh
- Kish Darreh
- Kolta Sar
- Kuryeh
- Latin Pard
- Masjed Pish
- Mishkeh
- Musa Kuh
- Palang Darreh
- Sefid Sangan
- Shalash Darreh
- Tataf Rud
- Teymur Kuh
- Tuseh Kaleh

== Sights ==
Dovaal Kuh (دوال کوه in local language), also known as "Do Alam Kuh", is mountain in the northern part of the rural district, bordering Gurab Zarmikh Rural District of Sowme'eh Sara County. The mountain is known for the imamzadeh shrines on its highest point. Dovaal Kuh is on the eastern slope of the Talysh Mountains in western Gilan with a height of 593 m (1,946 ft). Its western ridge connects the summit to the taller mountains of the region. Nearby villages are Tuseh Kaleh, Palang Darreh and Siah Varud of Fuman County, and Chalak Sar, Siah Kuh and Raftagi of Sowme'eh Sara County.
