= Siah Darreh, Kurdistan =

Siah Darreh سياه دره
- Village
- Country: Iran
- Province: Kurdistan
- County: Saqqez
- Bakhsh: Ziviyeh
- Rural District: Emam

Population (2006)
  - Total: 48
- Time zone: UTC+3:30 (IRST)
  - Summer (DST): UTC+4:30 (IRDT)

Siah Darreh (Persian: سياه دره, also Romanized as Sīāh Darreh) is a village in Emam Rural District, Ziviyeh District, Saqqez County, Kurdistan Province, Iran. At the 2006 census, its population was 48, in 11 families. The village is populated by Kurds.
