= Siah Darreh, Kermanshah =

Siah Darreh سياه دره
- Village
- Location within Iran
- Coordinates: 34°46′08″N 47°14′19″E
- Country: Iran
- Province: Kermanshah
- County: Sahneh
- Bakhsh: Dinavar
- Rural District: Horr

Population (2006)
  - Total: 76
- Time zone: UTC+3:30 (IRST)
  - Summer (DST): UTC+4:30 (IRDT)

Siah Darreh (Persian: سياه دره, also Romanized as Sīāh Darreh and Seyāh Darreh; also known as Siah Darra) is a village in Horr Rural District, Dinavar District, Sahneh County, Kermanshah Province, Iran. At the 2006 census, its population was 76, in 24 families.
