= Siah Darreh, Hamadan =

Siah Darreh سياه دره
- Village
- Location within Iran
- Coordinates: 34°16′05″N 47°59′09″E
- Country: Iran
- Province: Hamadan
- County: Nahavand
- Bakhsh: Central
- Rural District: Tariq ol Eslam

Population (2006)
  - Total: 260
- Time zone: UTC+3:30 (IRST)
  - Summer (DST): UTC+4:30 (IRDT)

Siah Darreh (Persian: سياه دره, also Romanized as Sīāh Darreh) is a village in Tariq ol Eslam Rural District, in the Central District of Nahavand County, Hamadan Province, Iran. At the 2006 census, its population was 260, in 56 families.
