= Siah Darreh-ye Olya =

Siah Darreh-ye Olya سياه دره عليا
- Village
- Location within Iran
- Coordinates: 34°22′06″N 48°21′22″E
- Country: Iran
- Province: Hamadan
- County: Nahavand
- Bakhsh: Khezel
- Rural District: Khezel-e Sharqi

Population (2006)
  - Total: 81
- Time zone: UTC+3:30 (IRST)
  - Summer (DST): UTC+4:30 (IRDT)

Siah Darreh-ye Olya (Persian: سياه دره عليا, also Romanized as Sīāh Darreh-ye ‘Olyā; also known as Şayyād Darreh, Seyāh Darreh, and Sīāh Darreh) is a village in Khezel-e Sharqi Rural District, Khezel District, Nahavand County, Hamadan Province, Iran. At the 2006 census, its population was 81, in 19 families.
