= Siyahrud Rural District =

Siyahrud Rural District (Persian: دهستان سياهرود) may refer to:

- Siyahrud Rural District (Mazandaran Province)
- Siyahrud Rural District (Tehran County), Tehran province
