= Siah Rudbar =

Siah Rudbar (Persian: سياه رودبار) may refer to:

- Siah Rudbar, Gilan
- Siah Rudbar, Golestan
