= Siah Kalan =

Siah Kalan or Siyah Kalan (Persian: سيه كلان) may refer to:

- Siah Kalan, Alborz
- Siah Kalan, East Azerbaijan
