= Siah Darreh, South Khorasan =

Siah Darreh سياه دره
- Village
- Location within Iran
- Coordinates: 32°33′56″N 59°30′11″E
- Country: Iran
- Province: South Khorasan
- County: Sarbisheh
- Bakhsh: Mud
- Rural District: Naharjan

Population (2006)
  - Total: 57
- Time zone: UTC+3:30 (IRST)
  - Summer (DST): UTC+4:30 (IRDT)

Siah Darreh (Persian: سياه دره, also Romanized as Sīāh Darreh and Siyah Darreh) is a village in Naharjan Rural District, Mud District, Sarbisheh County, South Khorasan Province, Iran. At the 2006 census, its population was 57, in 22 families.
