= Siah Kesh, Siahkalrud =

Siah Kesh سياه كش
- Village
- Location within Iran
- Coordinates: 37°00′20″N 50°25′51″E
- Country: Iran
- Province: Gilan
- County: Rudsar
- Bakhsh: Chaboksar
- Rural District: Siahkalrud

Population (2006)
  - Total: 92
- Time zone: UTC+3:30 (IRST)
  - Summer (DST): UTC+4:30 (IRDT)

Siah Kesh (Persian: سياه كش, also Romanized as Sīāh Kesh; also known as Sīākesh) is a village in Siahkalrud Rural District, Chaboksar District, Rudsar County, Gilan Province, Iran. At the 2006 census, its population was 92, in 22 families.
