= Siah Kuh =

Siah Kuh (Persian: سیاه‌کوه) may refer to:

- Siah Kuh, Amlash, Gilan Province, Iran
- Siah Kuh, Sowme'eh Sara, Gilan Province, Iran
