= Masuleh =

City in Gilan province, Iran

Masuleh Persian: ماسوله
- City
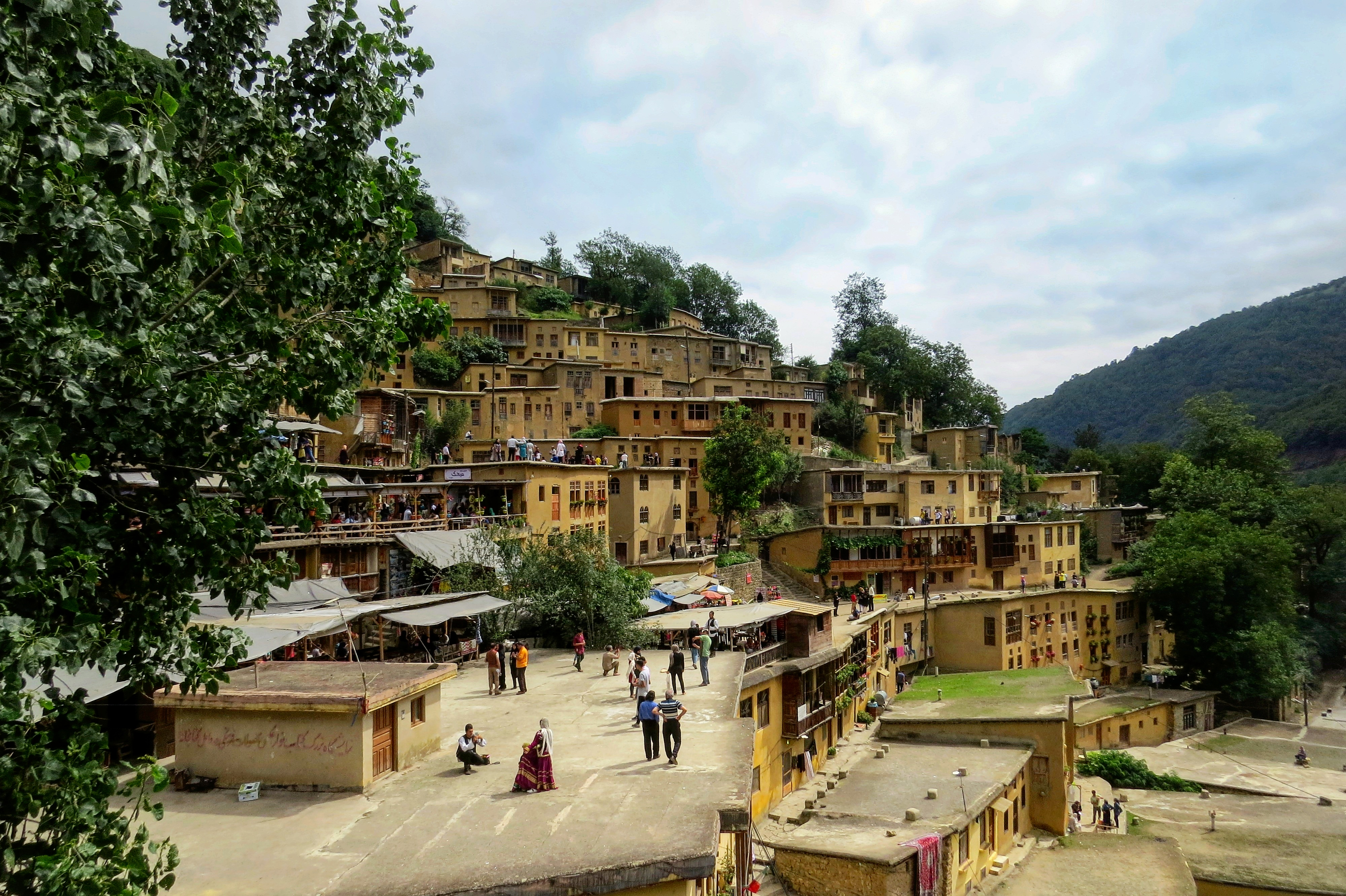
- Masuleh view

- Location within Iran
- Coordinates: 37°09′18″N 48°59′22″E
- Country: Iran
- Province: Gilan
- District: Sardar-e Jangal

Population (2016)
  - Total: 393
- Time zone: UTC+3:30 (IRST)

Masuleh (Persian: ماسوله;) (Note: Also romanized as Masouleh and Māsūleh; also known as Masoleh; historical names for the city include Khortāb and Māsalar) is a city in Sardar-e Jangal District of Fuman County, Gilan province, Iran.

Masuleh is approximately 60 km southwest of Rasht and 32 km west of Fuman. Its people are Talysh. The village is 1,050 meters above sea level in the Alborz mountain range, near the southern coast of the Caspian Sea. The village itself has a difference in elevation of 100 meters.

The formation of New Masuleh and the region's cultural and industrial development began after the Ilkhanid period. The Mongol invasion of Iran, along with waves of migration to the area, brought profound social and economic changes. These developments were further reinforced by the exchange of knowledge and the expansion of trade networks, which introduced new cultural and technical influences. One of the most significant factors was the growth of the iron industry, particularly the traditional production of sponge iron, which played a central role in shaping the region's economic foundation and subsequent development. The introduction of multi-stage iron furnaces in the area marked a major advancement in the traditional technology of iron production.

== Demographics ==
=== Language ===
The native people of Masuleh are Gilak and Talysh, they speak Talysh.

=== Population ===
At the time of the 2006 National Census, the city's population was 554 in 180 households. The following census in 2011 counted 568 people in 210 households. The 2016 census measured the population of the city as 393 people in 147 households.

== Climate ==
Climate data for Masuleh (37.15°N 48.983°E, 2006-2015 normals)
Month	Jan	Feb	Mar	Apr	May	Jun	Jul	Aug	Sep	Oct	Nov	Dec	Year
Mean daily maximum °C (°F)	7.66 (45.79)	7.55 (45.59)	11.55 (52.79)	15.02 (59.04)	19.72 (67.50)	22.77 (72.99)	23.94 (75.09)	24.69 (76.44)	18.79 (65.82)	16.94 (62.49)	12.17 (53.91)	8.69 (47.64)	15.79 (60.42)
Mean daily minimum °C (°F)	0.1 (32.2)	−0.31 (31.44)	2.91 (37.24)	6.46 (43.63)	11.34 (52.41)	14.76 (58.57)	16.31 (61.36)	16.7 (62.1)	13.88 (56.98)	10.03 (50.05)	4.99 (40.98)	1.48 (34.66)	8.22 (46.80)
Average precipitation mm (inches)	73.2 (2.88)	79.9 (3.15)	95.3 (3.75)	102.1 (4.02)	61.4 (2.42)	39.1 (1.54)	50.1 (1.97)	48.7 (1.92)	83.9 (3.30)	110.3 (4.34)	113.1 (4.45)	83.4 (3.28)	940.5 (37.02)
Source: IRIMO

== Architecture ==
Buildings are mostly two stories (1st floor and 'ground' floor), although there are three-story and four-story houses as well.

There are four main local communities at the city named: "Maza-var" (meaning beside the Mosque) at the south, "Khana-var" (beside homes) at the East, "Kasha-sar" (stretched on top) at the North, and, "Assa-mahala" (Assad community) at the West. Apparently, down town is the Market (Bazaar) area and also the main mosque of the city, named "O-ne-ben-ne Ali" (Awn Ibn Mohammad Ibn Ali Ibn. Abi Taleb) built in 969 AD.

In some of these houses, it has been possible to live in separate apartments in different periods. For example, the Zandipour House, which is now used as an apartment hotel, was accommodated by different families who lived in their separate apartment units for a long time. Each of these units had a separate bathroom and different families lived separately in each of the three floors. However, some three-story houses were occupied by an extended family as the children who were married lived together with their parents in a class structural house.

=== Girih tiling in buildings of Masuleh ===
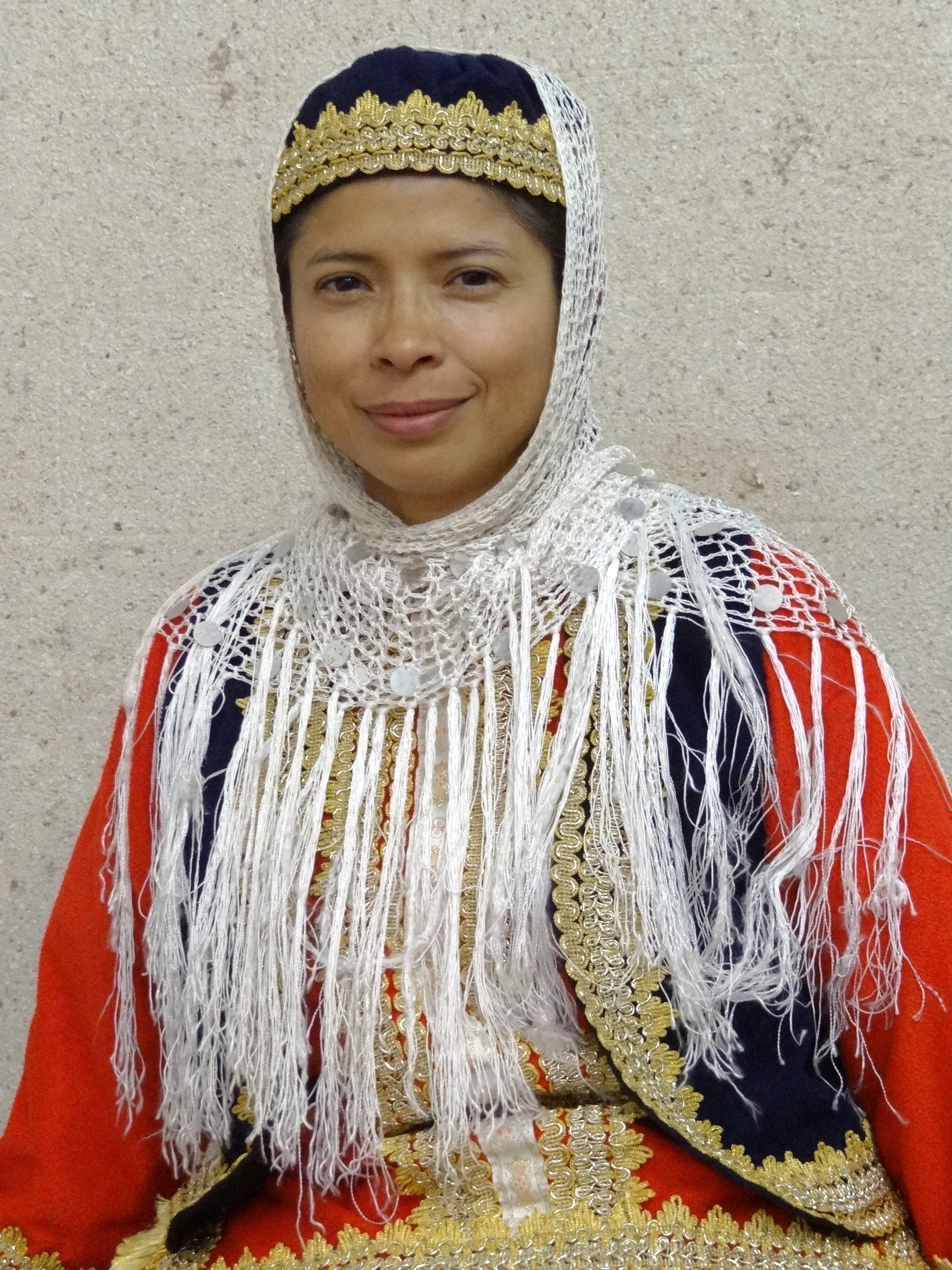
Traditional costume of Masuleh women

Girih tiling consists of straight and broken lines on a regular basis that could be reasonably expanded in the surface.

The historical city of Masuleh has been described as a model for sustainable architecture, with aims of respecting the culture and relationship with nature and improving the lifestyle of its residents.

== Archaeology ==
The earliest evidence of human presence in the Masouleh region, Iran, is a Levallois core from the Middle Paleolithic, likely made by Neanderthals over 40,000 years ago. This highlights Neanderthal activity in the area. Archaeological survey of the mountain ranges overlooking Masouleh shows that this mountainous region was probably occupied by ancient herders and nomads at least since the late Bronze Age.

Remains of late prehistoric, historic, and Islamic times were discovered on the mountain top above 2500 meters above sea level(See). These mountains were used seasonally, at least since the late Neolithic (5000 BC) Bronze Age (2000-1500 BC), which continued during the Iron Age I (1500-1100 BC), Iron Age III (800-500 BC), Parthian (247 BC to 224 CE), Buyid (943–1029 CE), Seljuk (1043–1051 CE) and Ilkhanid (1306–1335 CE) eras (tehrantimes).

Archaeologists discovered pottery sherds, animal bones, and stone tools that date back to about 7,000 years ago.

Studies of the last one or two decades have provided very important information about the historical origin and physical changes and development of the cultural landscape of Masouleh. Studies by the Gilan Archaeological Center and the National Museum of Iran showed that Masouleh has undergone significant changes due to advances in sponge iron smelting technology. This became especially important with the two seasons of studies by the Iran and China groups, because the examples of sponge iron smelting furnaces in Masouleh had special forms and were of a multi-stage type that are almost unique in the region. The four-stage sponge smelting furnaces, the first examples of which probably formed in the late Parthian period, and expanded significantly in the Islamic periods, especially from the Ilkhanate period. These furnaces later spread to the Hyrcanian region and became known as Persian furnaces.[14]/[15] Since 2022, in-depth studies have been conducted on archaeological sites located in the Masouleh Cultural Landscape in collaboration with the Chinese Academy of Archaeology and the National Museum of Iran. These studies aimed to identify the early kilns and the origin of the multi-stage kilns found in the kohneh Masouleh. The identification and excavations on sites such as Khanbaji Sara / Gilvand Rood / Kore Bar by this international joint group showed that from the beginning of the Islamic period to the Seljuk period, there were a variety of single-stage kilns and early multi-stage examples in these areas. Sassanid and Parthian pottery samples were also found in this area, indicating that the establishment of early industrial workshops probably continued even into the historical period. The industrial workshop sites of sponge iron smelting in the Masouleh Cultural Landscape are gathered like moons around the historical city of Masouleh (like the sun). The city of Masouleh is an excellent example of a city construction and development influenced by the activities of the sponge iron smelting industry. Studies on the multi-stage furnaces found in the kohneh Masuleh region and also the examples found near the historical city of Masuleh show that these furnaces are a serious innovation and development in the history of the development of the sponge iron smelting industry. The Hyrcanian forest land of Masuleh, along with the specific geographical and climatic features and the special winds of this region and the historical conditions after the Mongol invasion of Iran, have been cited as the source of this serious transformation in the cultural landscape of Masuleh.

== Tourism areas ==
Waterfalls: Kooshm, Larcheshme, and Kourbar.

== Gallery ==
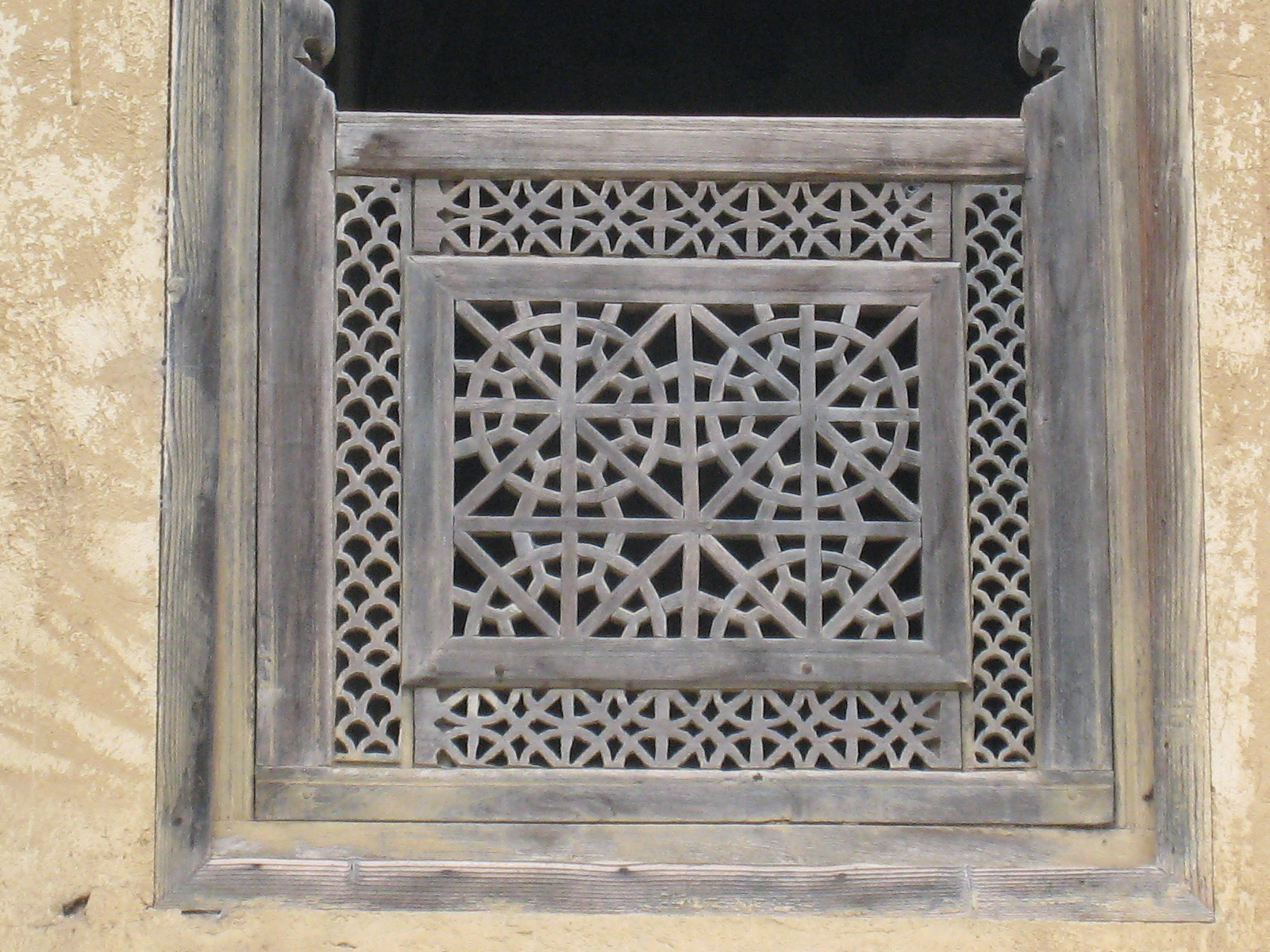
Window of building in Masuleh

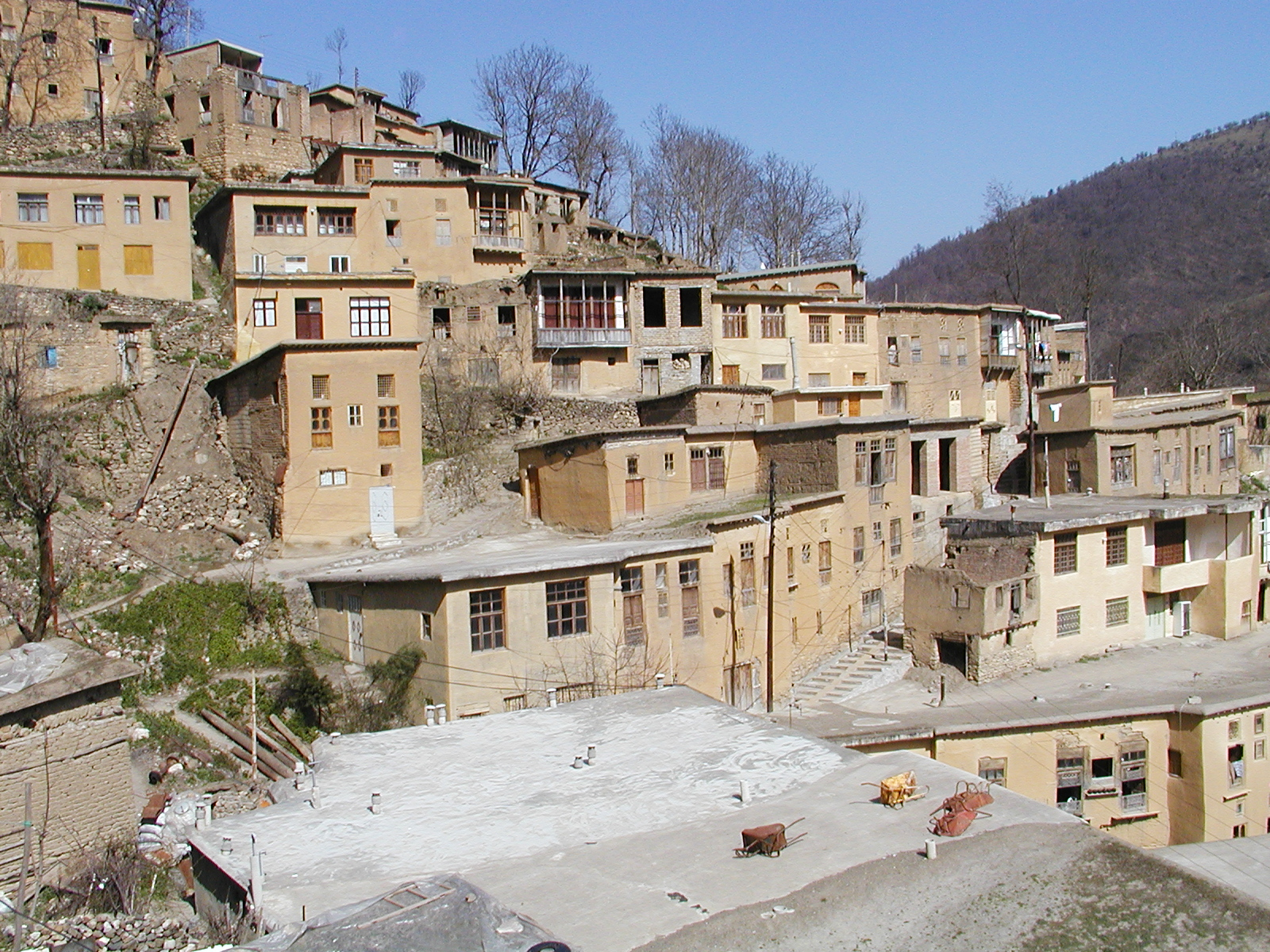
The yard of the above building is the roof of the below building

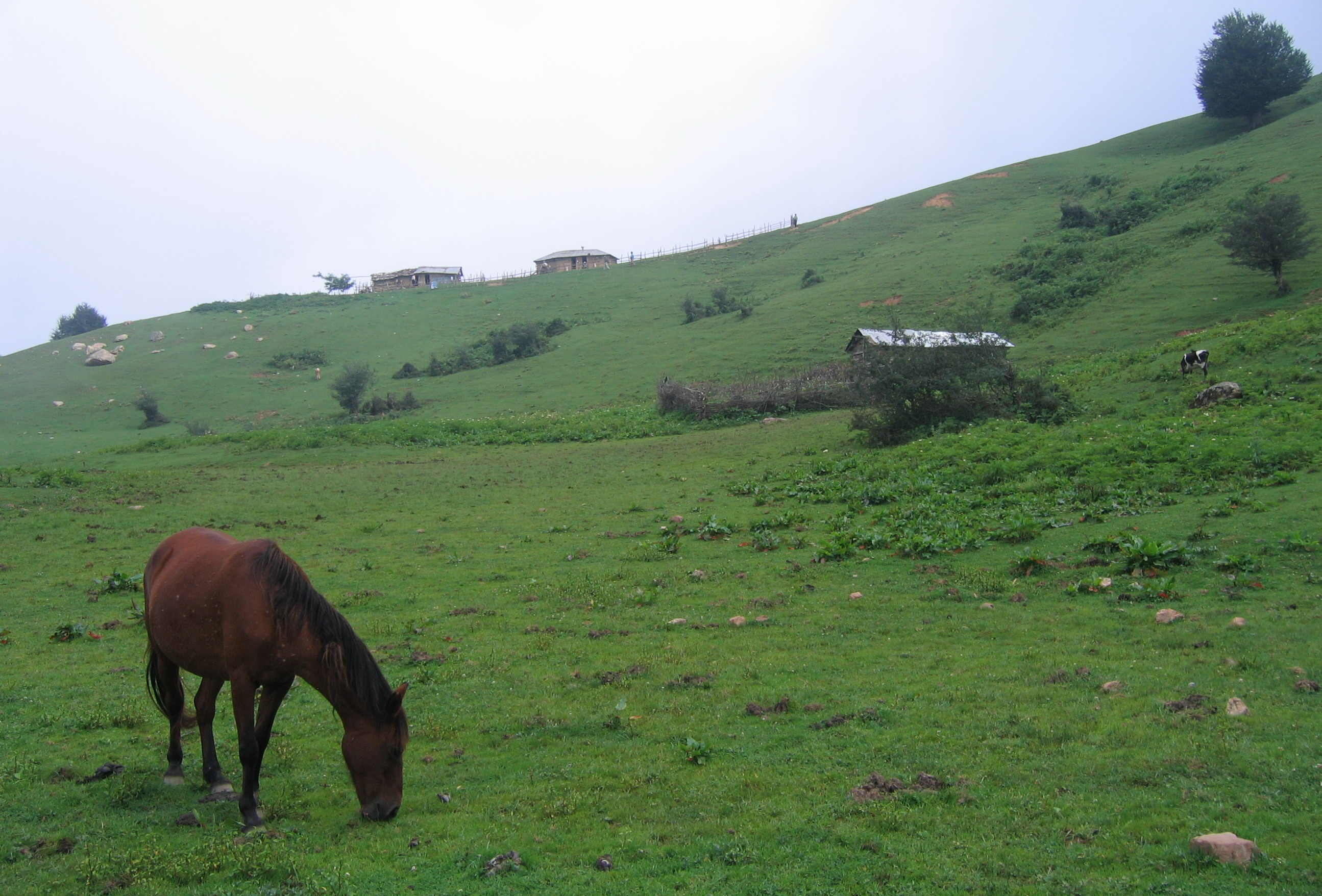
The nature of Masuleh

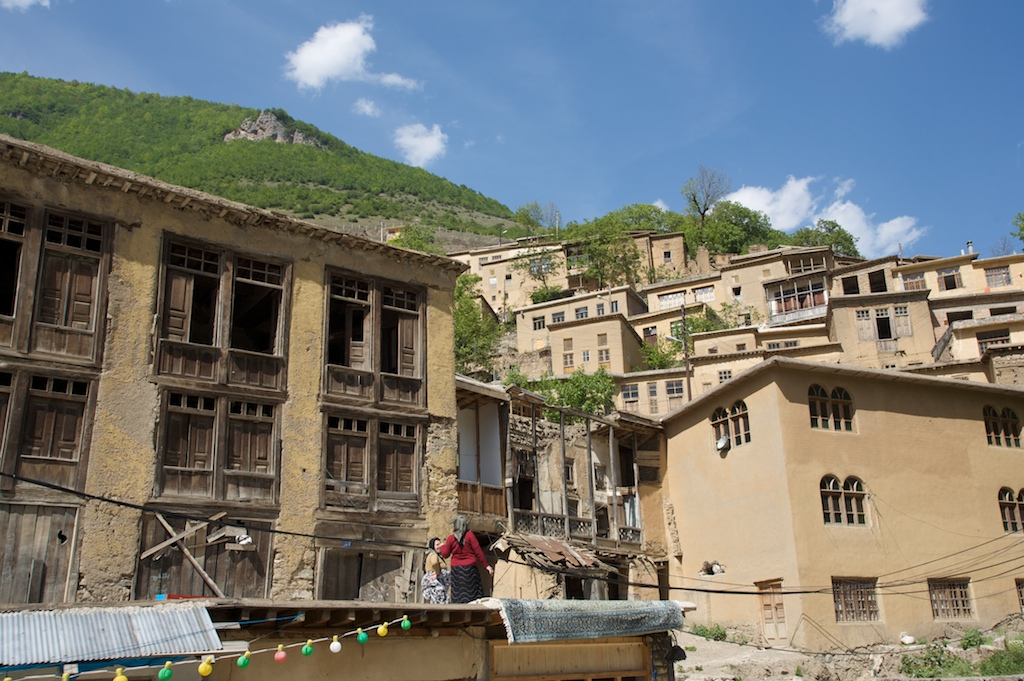
Buildings are mostly 2 stories

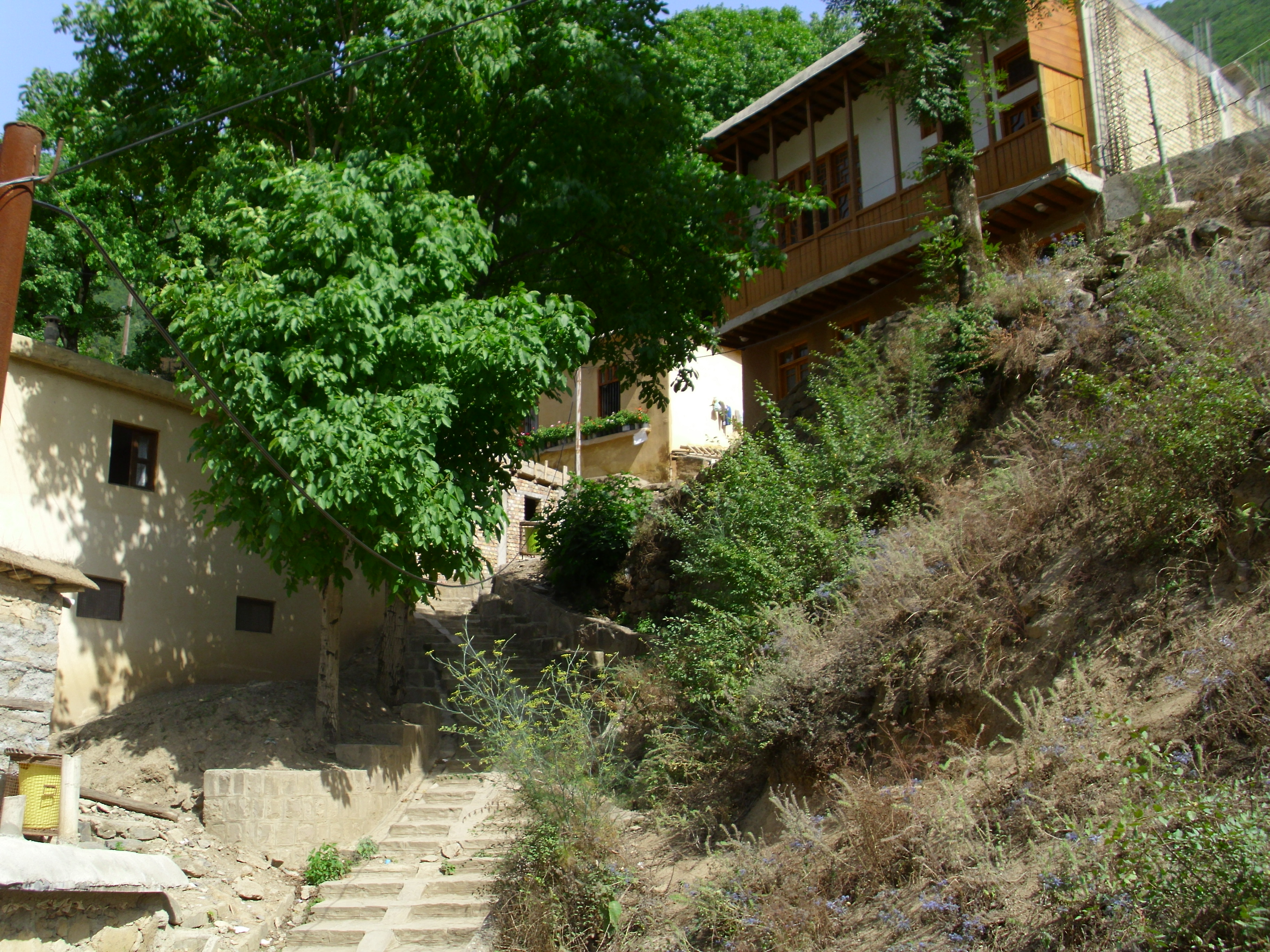

== See also ==
- Sar Agha Seyed Village
- Zonouz

Media related to Masuleh at Wikimedia Commons
