= Fuman, Iran =

City in Gilan province, Iran

Fuman Persian: فومن
- City
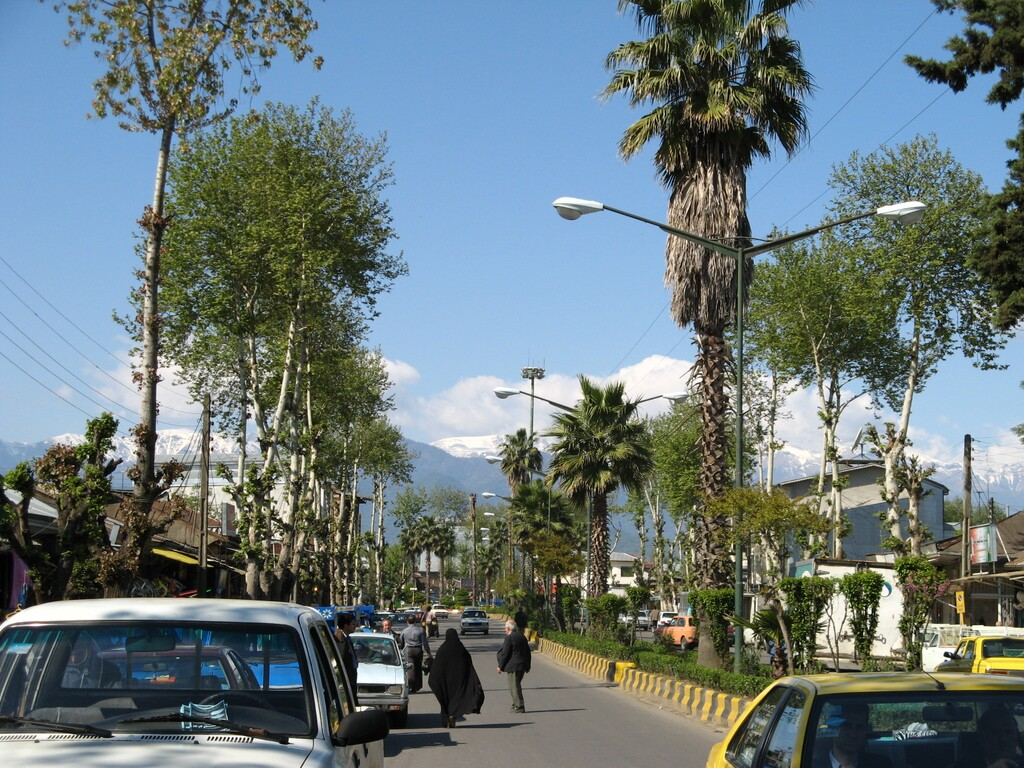
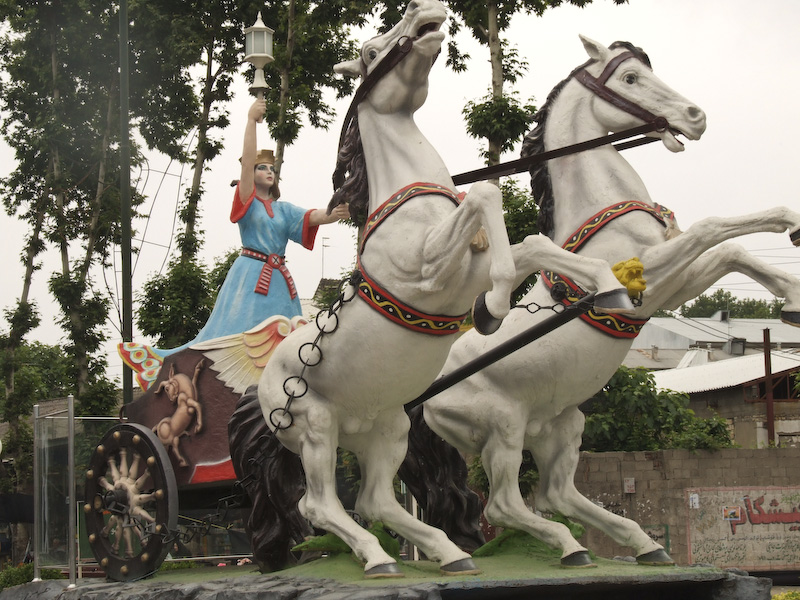
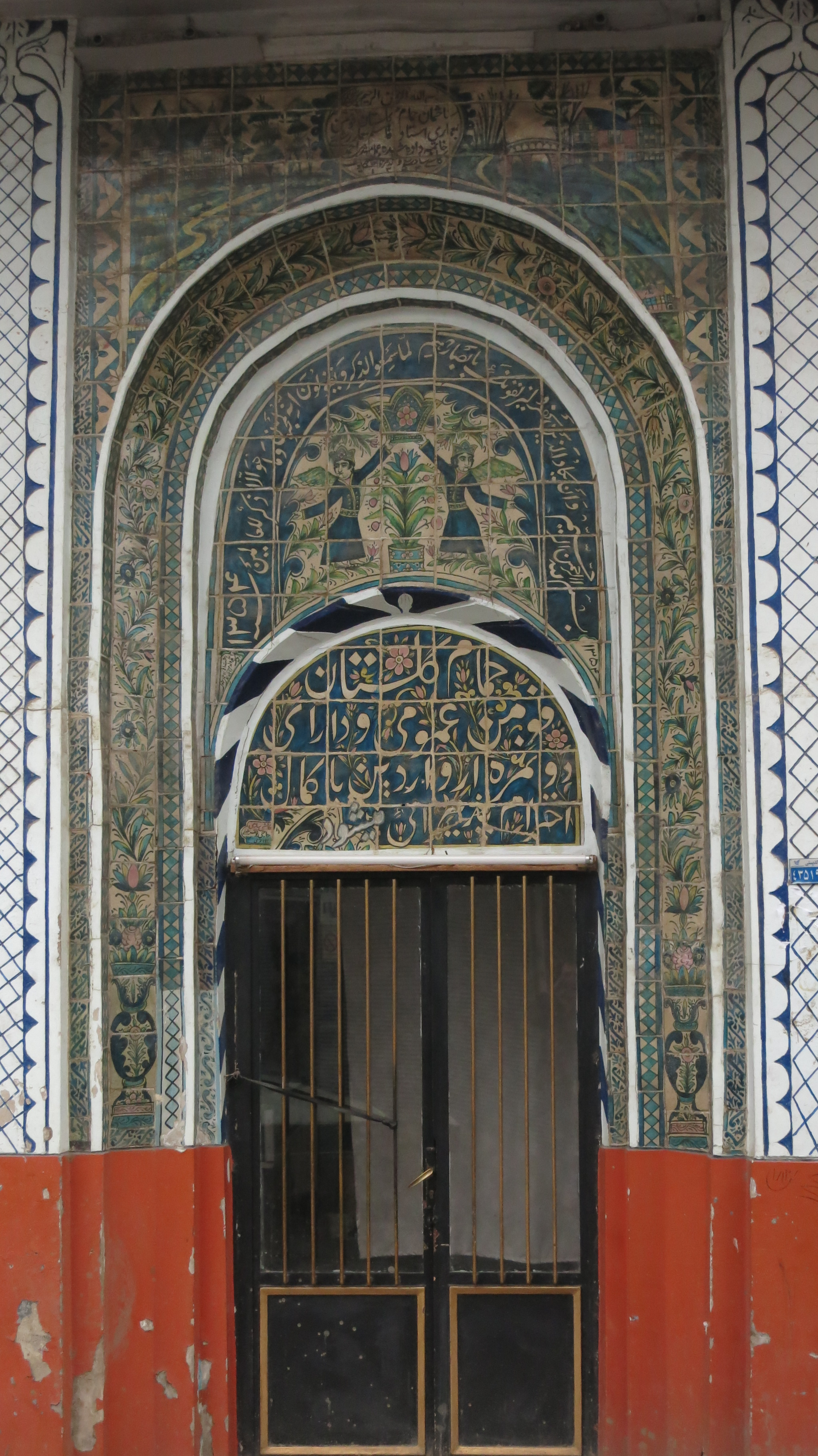
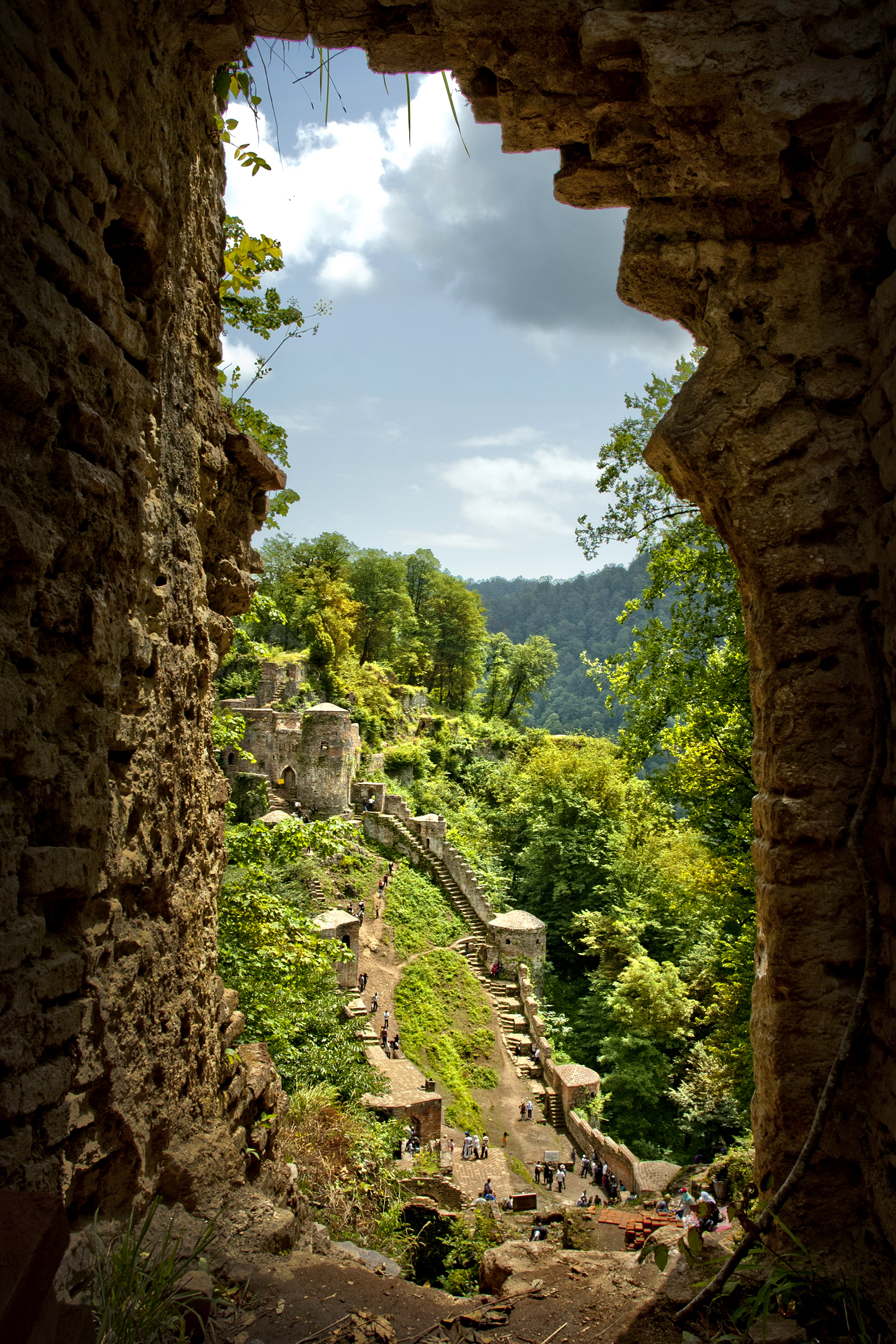
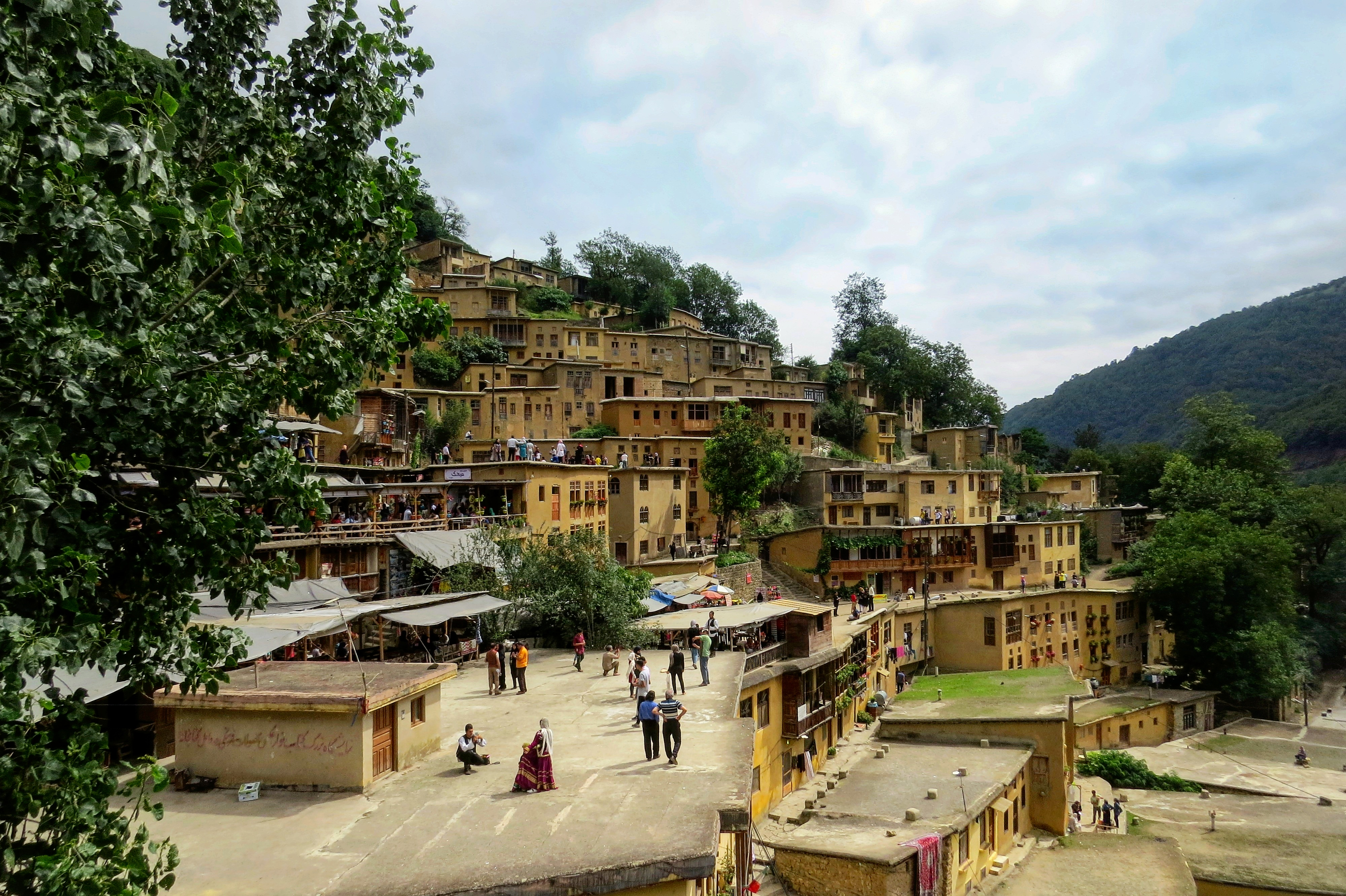
- Top to bottom, left to right: A street in Fuman, Gilan; Fouman's Anahita Statue; Fouman's Old Public Bath entrance tiles; Fouman's Rudkhan Castle; Masouleh, a historial city in Fouman county

- Location within Iran
- Coordinates: 37°13′27″N 49°18′45″E
- Country: Iran
- Province: Gilan
- County: Fuman
- District: Central

Area
  - Total: 29 km^{2} (11 sq mi)
- Elevation: −3 m (−9.8 ft)

Population (2016)
  - Total: 35,841
  - Density: 1,200/km^{2} (3,200/sq mi)
- Time zone: UTC+3:30 (IRST)
- Climate: Cfa

Fuman (Persian: فومن) (Note: Also romanized as Fooman, Fūman, and Fumen; Gilaki: فؤمن) is a city in the Central District of Fuman County in Iran's northwestern Gilan province, serving as capital of both its county and its district.

Rice has been cultivated in this region for many years, where some indigenous cultivars were conventionally bred by farmers. Fuman also produces popular cookies known as Persian: کلوچه (koluche). Fuman's koluche is thinner and larger than Lahijan's.

The city is also known for its statues, including the statue of the ancient Iranian goddess Anahita and the statue of the Four Girls.

== History ==
From 660 to 760, Fuman functioned as the seat of the Zoroastrian Dabuyid rulers. During the period of the Mongol occupation of Iran, Fuman and Lahijan were among the main towns of Gilan. The local ruler of Fuman at that time, who was reportedly the "only Shafi'ite among the rulers of Gilan", was able to generate a large amount of revenue through lucrative silk trade. According to Hamdallah Mustawfi (d. 1349), Fuman was a large city, and the center of a wealthy region which produced large quantities of "wheat, rice and silk".

Fuman continued to function as the capital of the Bia-pas region (western Gilan) until 1572–1573, when ruler Jamshid Soltan made Rasht the capital. From the reign of King (Shah) Sultan Husayn (r. 1694–1722) to Fath-Ali Shah Qajar (r. 1797–1834), the local rulers of Fuman were involved in a fierce rivalry with the local rulers of neighboring Shaft. John Elton, who had been prominent under Nader Shah (r. 1736–1747), was killed in 1751 on the order of one of these rulers, Agha Jamal Fumani.

In 1805, during the reign of Fath-Ali Shah Qajar, Fuman was reportedly "still a small, open town with about a thousand houses and a very lively market". However, the situation changed when Hajji Mohammad Khan abandoned Fuman for Rasht during the early reign of Naser al-Din Shah Qajar (r. 1848–1896). In the subsequent period, Fuman "fell into decay". According to Grigorii Melgunov, who visited Fuman in 1860, it was little more than a village consisting of just 140 houses surrounding the palace of the local ruler. Fuman has regained importance since the mid-20th century.

== Demographics ==
=== Language, ethnicity, and religion ===
The majority of the inhabitants are Shia Muslims, with a minority of Sunnis present in the city.

The Inhabitants of Fuman are mostly Gilaks and they speak a Fumani variety of Western Gilaki language.

The linguistic composition of the city is:

Fuman linguistic composition
language	percent
New Persian	60%
Gilaki	25%
Talysh	15%

=== Population ===
At the time of the 2006 National Census, the city's population was 27,763 in 7,728 households. The following census in 2011 counted 30,608 people in 9,332 households. The 2016 census measured the population of the city as 35,841 people in 11,849 households.

== Geography ==
Fuman is only 21 kilometres to the west-southwest of Rasht, and 356 kilometres away from the national capital Tehran. It is situated near the foothills of the Talysh Highlands. Fuman is on the road to the historical city of Masuleh and, as a result, receives a sizeable number of tourists.

== Sports ==
Football is the most popular sport in Fuman, and the city is host to Shahrdari Fuman FC, who play in the Iranian third tier.

== Notable people ==
- Jafar Shojouni, Shia Cleric
- Mohammad-Taqi Bahjat Foumani, Shia Cleric

== Gallery ==
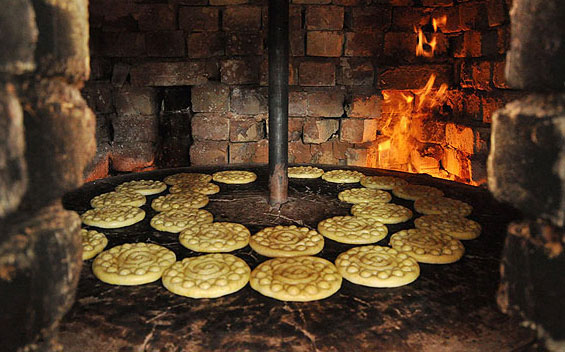
Renowned thin koluche (cookies) in Fuman.

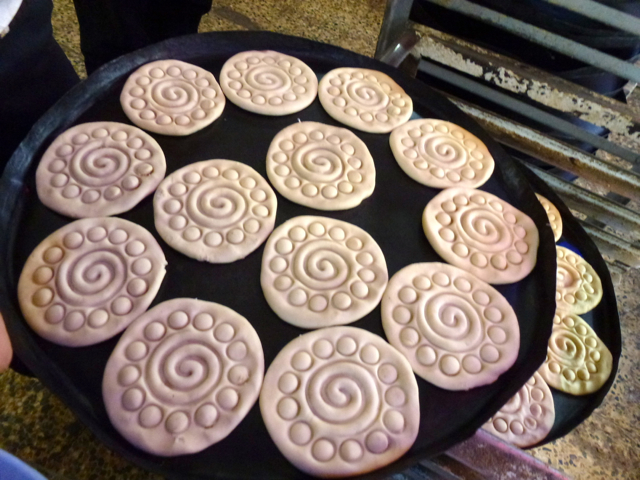
Fuman's koluche prior to being cooked.

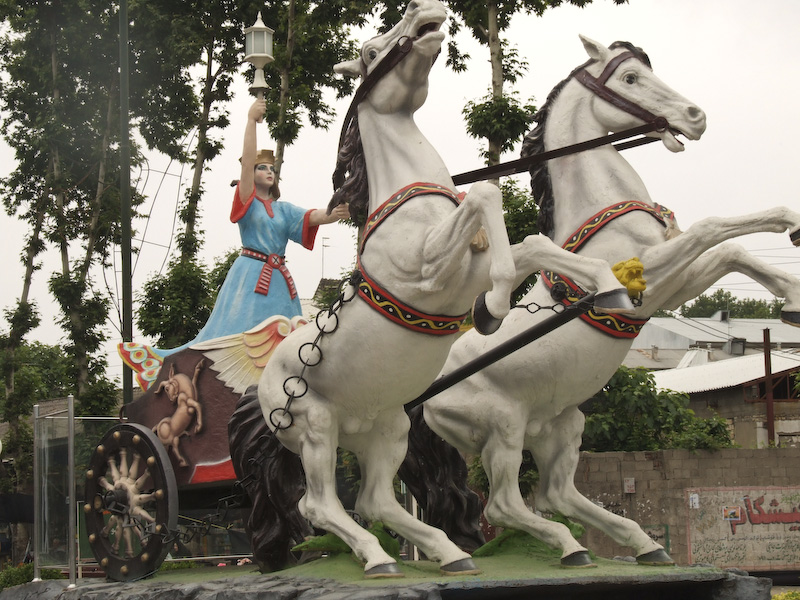
The statue of Anahita, an ancient Iranian goddess, in Fuman.

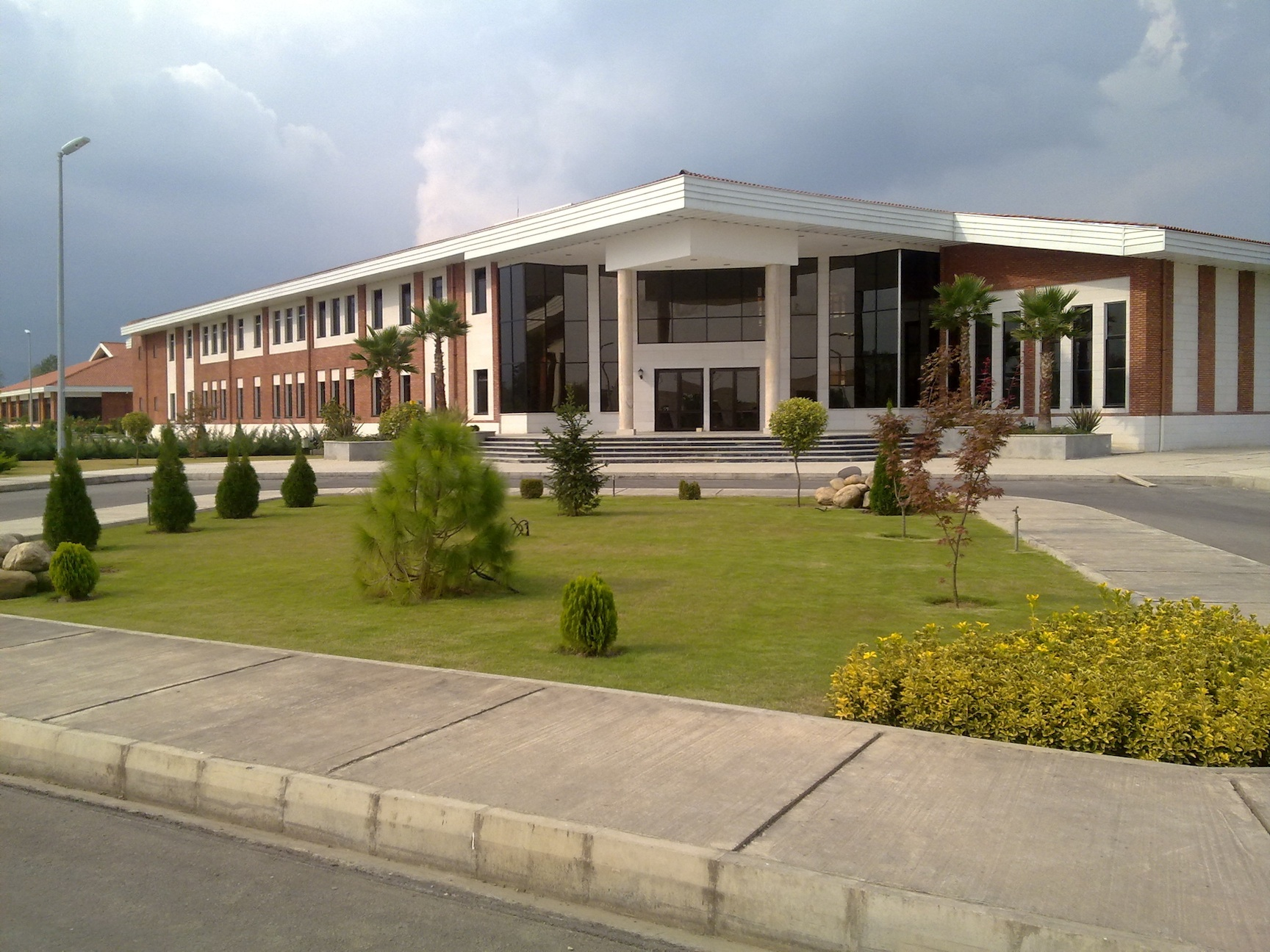
The Engineering College of Fuman belongs to the University of Tehran.

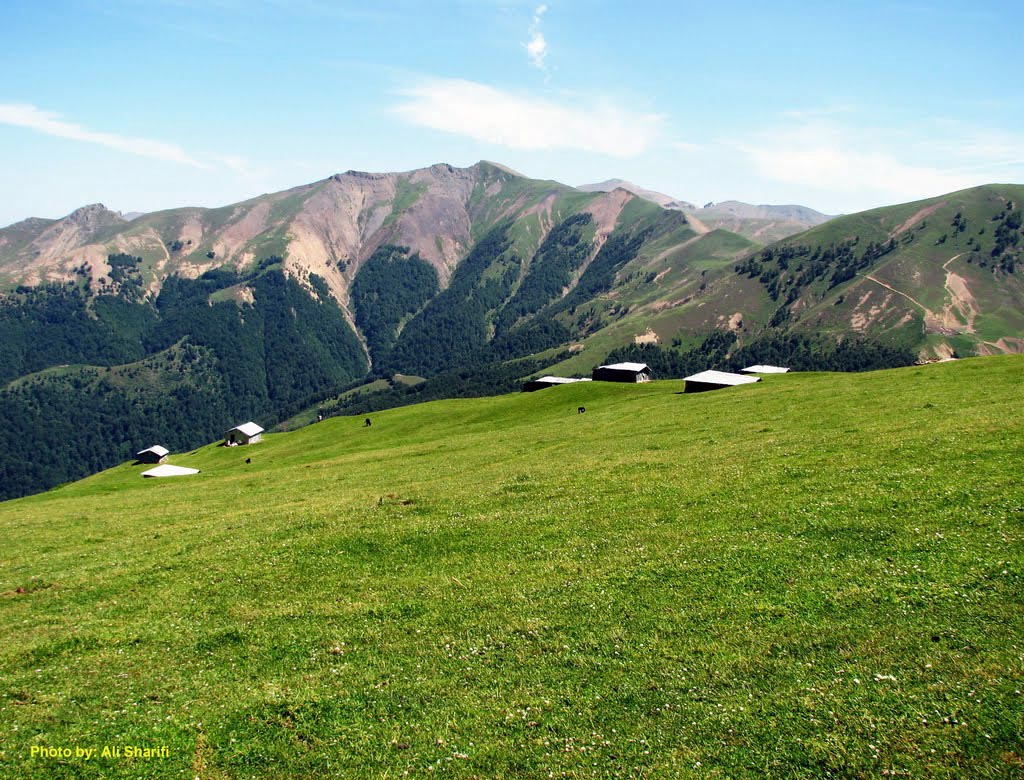
Gasht is also located in Fuman County, near the city of Fuman.

== See also ==
Fouman travel guide from Wikivoyage

== Sources ==
- Bazin, Marcel (2000). "FŪMAN". Encyclopaedia Iranica, Vol. X, Fasc. 3. pp. 227–228.
- Goto, Yukako (2017). "KĀR KIĀ". Encyclopaedia Iranica.
