= Sardar-e Jangal Rural District =

Rural district in Gilan province, Iran

Sardar-e Jangal Rural District Persian: دهستان سردارجنگل
- Rural District
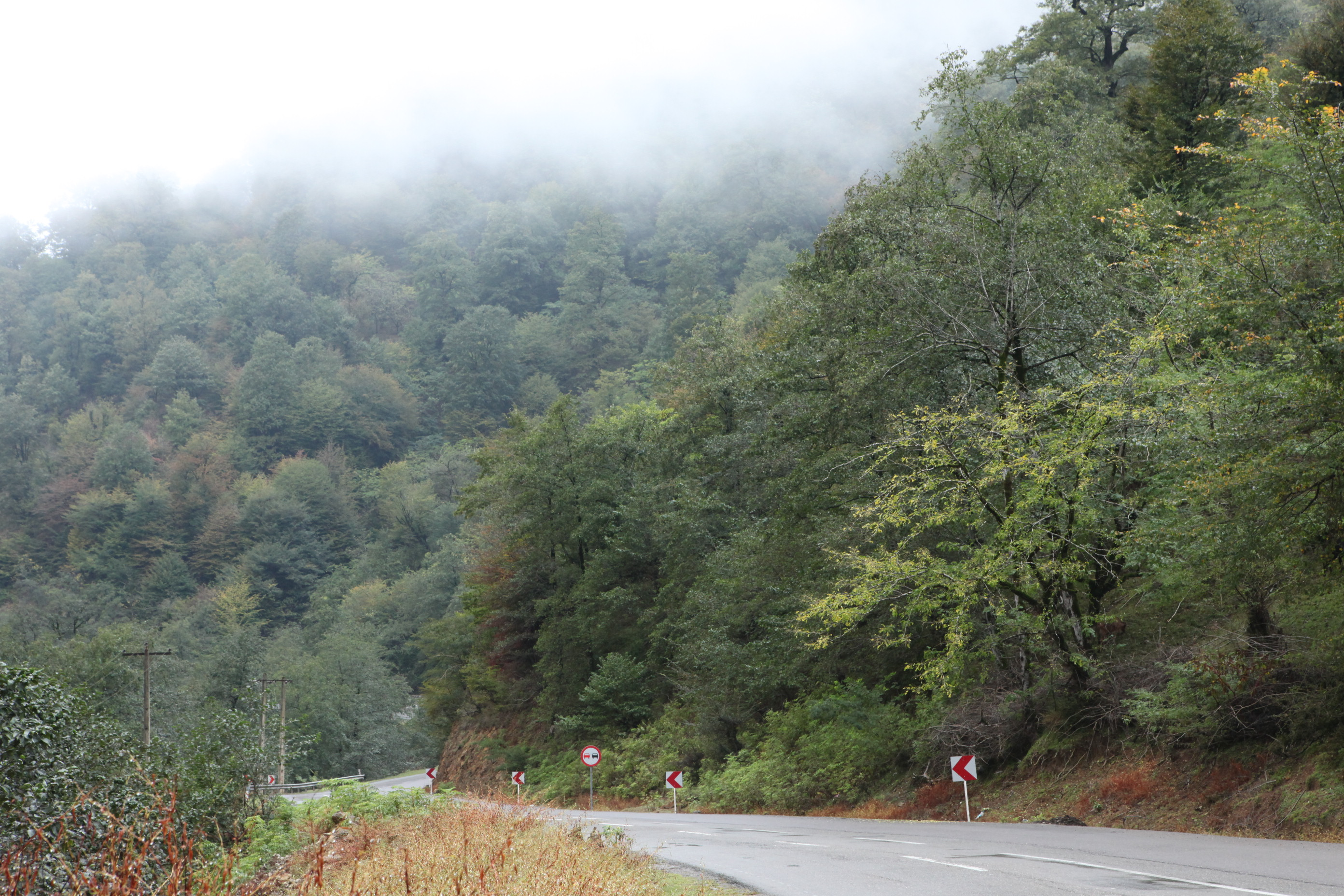

- Location within Iran
- Coordinates: 37°11′N 49°04′E
- Country: Iran
- Province: Gilan
- County: Fuman
- District: Sardar-e Jangal
- Established: 1987
- Capital: Maklavan

Population (2016)
  - Total: 6,781
- Time zone: UTC+3:30 (IRST)

Sardar-e Jangal Rural District (Persian: دهستان سردارجنگل) is in Sardar-e Jangal District of Fuman County, Gilan province, Iran. It is administered from the city of Maklavan. (Note: Formerly the village of Maklavan-e Bala)

== Demographics ==
=== Population ===
At the time of the 2006 National Census, the rural district's population was 10,311 in 2,739 households. There were 9,450 inhabitants in 2,883 households at the following census of 2011. The 2016 census measured the population of the rural district as 6,781 in 2,318 households. The most populous of its 52 villages was Zideh-ye Pain, with 876 people.

=== Other villages in the rural district ===
- Abrud
- Gasgareh
- Kalarm
- Khaneh Vaneh
- Kuchi Chal
- Shirzeyl
- Zideh-ye Bala
