= Sardar-e Jangal District =

District in Gilan province, Iran

Sardar-e Jangal District Persian: بخش سردار جنگل
- District
- Location within Iran
- Coordinates: 37°12′N 49°04′E
- Country: Iran
- Province: Gilan
- County: Fuman
- Established: 2002
- Capital: Maklavan

Population (2016)
  - Total: 12,188
- Time zone: UTC+3:30 (IRST)

Sardar-e Jangal District (Persian: بخش سردار جنگل) is in Fuman County, Gilan province, Iran. Its capital is the city of Maklavan. (Note: Formerly the village of Maklavan-e Bala)

== History ==
The village of Maklavan-e Bala merged with Maklavan-e Pain to become the city of Maklavan in 2012.

== Demographics ==
=== Population ===
At the time of the 2006 census, the district's population was 15,339 in 4,065 households. The following census in 2011 counted 13,737 people in 4,244 households. The 2016 census measured the population of the district as 12,188 inhabitants in 4,169 households.

=== Administrative divisions ===
Sardar-e Jangal District Population
Administrative Divisions	2006	2011	2016
Aliyan RD	4,474	3,719	3,379
Sardar-e Jangal RD	10,311	9,450	6,781
Maklavan (city)			1,635
Masuleh (city)	554	568	393
Total	15,339	13,737	12,188
RD = Rural District
