= Fuman County =

County in Gilan province, Iran

Fuman County Persian: شهرستان فومن
- County
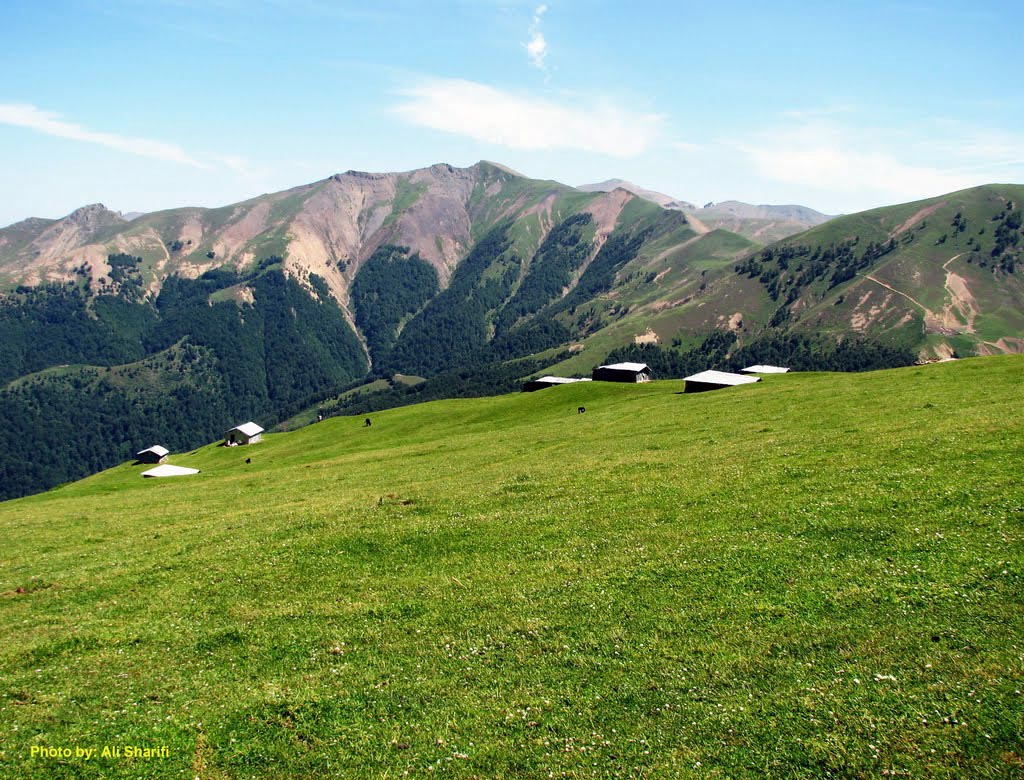
- Gasht Rodkan Protected Area in Fuman County

- Location of Fuman County in Gilan province (center left, green)

- Location of Gilan province in Iran
- Coordinates: 37°08′N 49°12′E
- Country: Iran
- Province: Gilan
- Capital: Fuman
- Districts: Central, Sardar-e Jangal

Population (2016)
  - Total: 92,310
- Time zone: UTC+3:30 (IRST)

Fuman County (Persian: شهرستان فومن) is in Gilan province, in northwestern Iran. Its capital is the city of Fuman.

== History ==
The village of Maklavan-e Bala merged with Maklavan-e Pain to become the city of Maklavan in 2012.

== Demographics ==
=== Population ===
At the time of the 2006 census, the county's population was 96,788 in 25,978 households. The following census in 2011 counted 93,737 people in 28,622 households. The 2016 census measured the population of the county as 92,310 in 31,209 households.

=== Administrative divisions ===
Fuman County's population history and administrative structure over three consecutive censuses are shown in the following table.

Fuman County Population
Administrative Divisions	2006	2011	2016
Central District	81,449	80,000	80,120
Gasht RD	16,781	16,031	14,514
Gurab Pas RD	11,312	10,207	9,007
Lulaman RD	10,927	9,952	8,622
Rud Pish RD	14,666	13,202	12,136
Fuman (city)	27,763	30,608	35,841
Sardar-e Jangal District	15,339	13,737	12,188
Aliyan RD	4,474	3,719	3,379
Sardar-e Jangal RD	10,311	9,450	6,781
Maklavan (city) (Note: Formerly the village of Maklavan-e Bala)			1,635
Masuleh (city)	554	568	393
Total	96,788	93,737	92,310
RD = Rural District

== See also ==
Media related to Fuman County at Wikimedia Commons
