= Ganz (surname) =

Origin
- Languages: German, French, Dutch, Scandinavian, Jewish
- Region of origin: Germany, Switzerland, Austria, the Netherlands, Belgium, France, Scandinavian countries, Israel

Other names
- Variant forms: Spelling variation: Hebrew: גַנְץ, Yiddish: גאנץ, Gancz, Gantz, Romanian: Ganț: Gans, Ganss, Gansz; Ganzer, Gantzer; Ganser, Gansser

Ganz (German pronunciation: [ˈɡants]) is a surname. Notable people with the surname include:

- Ábrahám Ganz, Swiss merchant and founder of the Ganz companies
- Aura Ganz, Israeli-American computer engineer
- Bruno Ganz (1941–2019), Swiss actor
- Caterina Ganz (born 1995), Italian cross-country skier
- Edwin F. Ganz, American politician
- Hugo Ganz (1822-1922), German journalist
- Joan Ganz Cooney, American businesswoman and television producer
- Josef Ganz, German car designer
- Lowell Ganz, American screenwriter
- Maurizio Ganz, Italian footballer
- Megan Ganz, American comedy writer
- Peter Ganz (1920–2006), Germanist
- P. Felix Ganz (1922–1990), American stamp collector
- Rhonda Ganz, Canadian poet and illustrator
- Rudolph Ganz, Swiss pianist, conductor, and composer
- Valerie Ganz, Welsh painter
- Victor Ganz (1913–1987), art collector

== Fictional ==
- Sebastian Ganz, fictional character

== Ganț ==
- Ovidiu Victor Ganţ (born 1966, Detta, Banat), Romanian politician of Banat-Swabian origin

== See also ==
- Gans (surname)
- Frank Gansz (1938– 2009), former head coach of the Kansas City Chiefs
- Gantz (surname)
- Ganz (disambiguation)
