= Gans (surname) =

Gans is a Dutch and German noun meaning "goose".
It is also a surname. Notable people with the surname include:

- Bird Stein Gans (1868–1944), American educator involved in parent education
- Bob Gans (1887–1959), American slot-machine magnate and philanthropist
- Bruce Gans, American physiatrist
- Carl Gans (1923–2009), Jewish German-American zoologist and herpetologist
- Christophe Gans (born 1960), French film director
- Curtis Gans (1937–2015), American political activist and voting expert
- Danny Gans (1956–2009), American singer and comedian
- David Gans (1541–1613), Jewish German-Czech mathematician, historian and astronomer
- David Gans (musician) (born 1953), American musician, songwriter and music journalist
- Donovan Gans (born 1971), American football player
- Eduard Gans (1797–1839), Jewish German jurist
- Eric Gans (born 1941), American literary scholar and professor
- Herbert J. Gans (1927–2025), American sociologist
- Joachim Gans, 16th-century Jewish Czech mining expert, first Jew to live in North America
- Joe Gans (1874–1910), American boxer
- José Moreno Gans (1897–1976), Spanish composer
- Joshua Gans, Australian economist
- Judy Gans (1886–1949), American baseball player
- Julius J. Gans (1896–1973), American lawyer, politician, and judge
- Lothar Gans (born 1953), German football player
- Ludwig Aaron Gans (1794–1871), German industrialist
- Mitchell Gans, American legal scholar
- Óscar Gans (1903–1965), Cuban attorney and politician
- Panama Joe Gans (1896–1983), Barbadian boxer
- Paula Gans (1883–1941), Czech painter
- Peter Gans (born 1937), Dutch football referee
- Richard Gans, founder of the Spanish type foundry Fundiciòn Richard Gans
- Richard Gans (1880–1954), Jewish German physicist
- Ron Gans (1931–2010), American voice-over artist and character actor
- Sharon Gans (1935–2021), American actress
- Solomon Philip Gans (1788–1843), German jurist
- Stedman Gans (born 1997), South African rugby player
- Hans Gans - German name of Jan Hus

== Gansz ==
- Frank Gansz (1938–2009), American football coach
- Gansz Trophy

== See also ==
- Ganz (disambiguation)
- Gantz (disambiguation)
- Gan (surname)
