= Gants =

Gants may refer to:

- The Gants, an American rock band
- Gants language, of Papua New Guinea
- India Gants (born 1996), American fashion model
- Ralph Gants (1954–2020), American attorney and jurist

== See also ==
- Gants Hill, an area of London, England
- Gant (disambiguation)
- Gantz (disambiguation)
- Ganz (disambiguation)
