= Lowheh Sara =

Neighborhood in Gilan province, Iran

Lowheh Sara Persian: لوحه سرا
- Neighborhood, former village
- Location within Iran
- Coordinates: 37°21′15″N 49°07′45″E
- Country: Iran
- Province: Gilan
- County: Masal
- District: Central
- City: Masal
- Elevation: 77 m (253 ft)
- Time zone: UTC+3:30 (IRST)

Lowheh Sara (Persian: لوحه سرا) (Note: Also romanized as Lowheh Sarā) is a suburban neighborhood in the city of Masal in the Central District of Masal County, Gilan province, Iran.

It is 2 km (1.2 mi) south of the city's Bazaar, near Masal River.

== Demographics ==
People of Lowheh Sara speak Talysh, Gilaki and Persian languages. Its main agricultural product was rice.

=== Population ===
In 1950, Lowheh Sara was a village in Masal-Shanderman District of Talesh County, south of Masal city. Its population was 472 people. The 1956 census measured a population of 500 people.

At the time of the 1966 census, Lowheh Sara had a population of 652 people in 108 households. The village had a mosque, elementary school and electricity.
