= Rizeh Mandan =

Rizeh Mandan ريزه مندان
- Village
- Location within Iran
- Coordinates: 37°11′01″N 49°02′48″E
- Country: Iran
- Province: Gilan
- County: Masal
- Bakhsh: Central
- Rural District: Masal

Population (2016)
  - Total: 15
- Time zone: UTC+3:30 (IRST)

Rizeh Mandan (Persian: ريزه مندان, also Romanized as Rīzeh Mandān; also known as Rīzmandan) is a village in Masal Rural District, in the Central District of Masal County, Gilan Province, Iran. It is a western suburb of Masal city.

At the time of the 2006 National Census, the village's population was 26 in 7 households. The following census in 2011 counted less than 4 households. The 2016 census measured the population of the village as 15 people in 4 households.
