= Mileh Sara =

Village in Gilan province, Iran

Mileh Sara Persian: ميله سرا
- Village
- Location within Iran
- Coordinates: 37.378°N 49.12°E
- Country: Iran
- Province: Gilan
- County: Masal
- District: Central
- Rural District: Howmeh

Population (2016)
  - Total: 430
- Time zone: UTC+3:30 (IRST)

Mileh Sara (Persian: ميله سرا) (Note: Also romanized as Mīleh Sarā) is a northern suburb of the city of Masal and a village in Howmeh Rural District of the Central District in Masal County, Gilan province, Iran.

== Demographics ==
=== Population ===
At the time of the 2006 National Census, the village's population was 1,032 in 269 households. The following census in 2011 counted 473 people in 135 households as part of the village was annexed by Masal city. The 2016 census measured the population of the village as 430 people in 131 households.
