= Vezmtar =

Vezmtar وزمتر
- Village
- Location within Iran
- Coordinates: 37°26′28″N 49°05′37″E
- Country: Iran
- Province: Gilan
- County: Masal
- Bakhsh: Shanderman
- Rural District: Shanderman

Population (2006)
  - Total: 400
- Time zone: UTC+3:30 (IRST)
  - Summer (DST): UTC+4:30 (IRDT)

Vezmtar (Persian: وزمتر) is an Iranian village in Shanderman Rural District, Shanderman District, Masal County, Gilan Province. At the 2006 census, its population was 400 inhabitants, in 100 families.
