= Taskuh =

Village in Gilan province, Iran

Taskuh Persian: طاسكوه
- Village
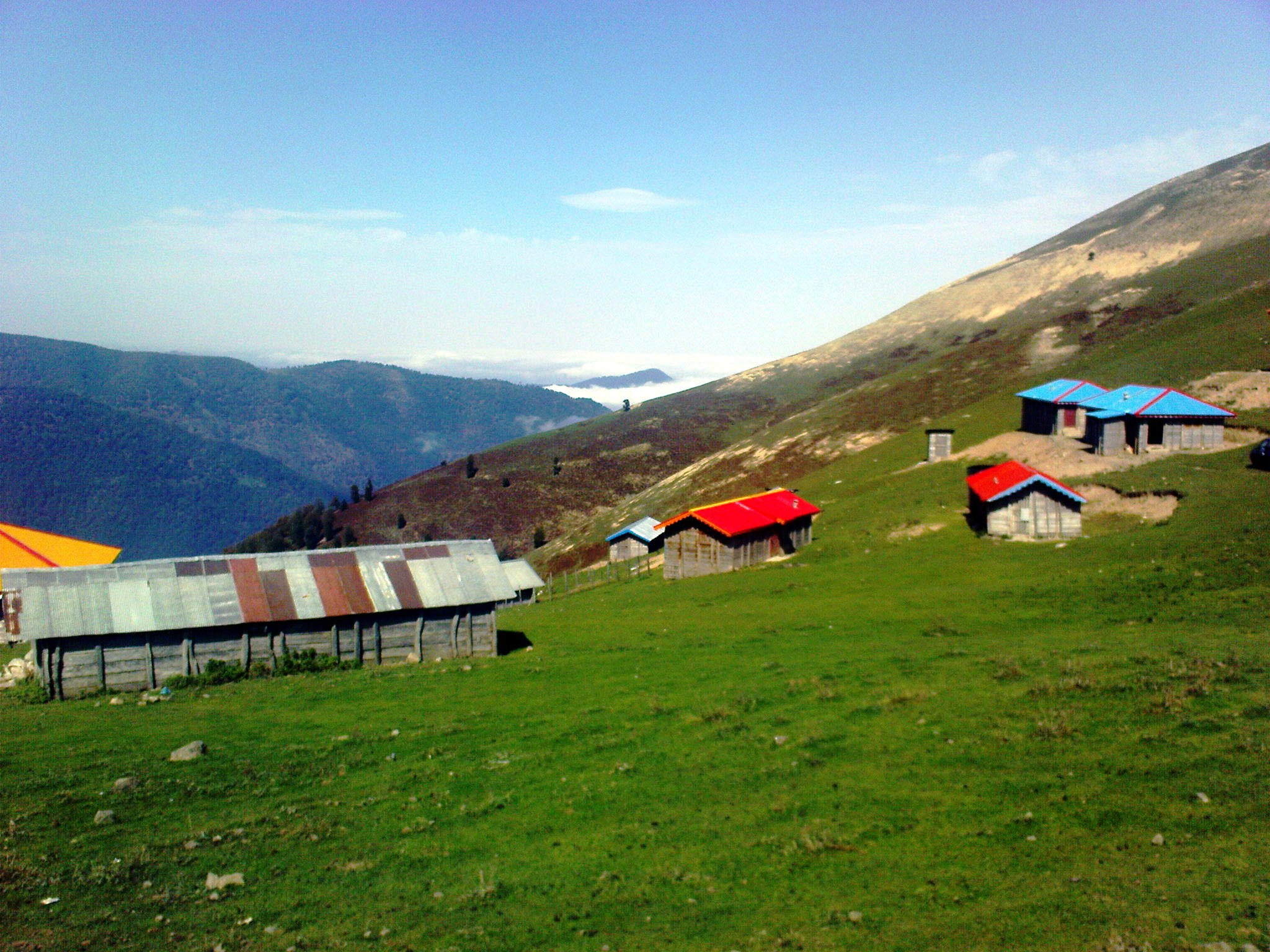
- Taskuh

- Location within Iran
- Coordinates: 37°20′38″N 49°04′45″E
- Country: Iran
- Province: Gilan
- County: Masal
- District: Central
- Rural District: Masal

Population (2016)
  - Total: 423
- Time zone: UTC+3:30 (IRST)

Taskuh (Persian: طاسكوه) (Note: Also romanized as Ţāskūh; also known as Taskoh and Ţāskū) is a village in, and the capital of, Masal Rural District in the Central District of Masal County, in Iran's Gilan province.

== Demographics ==
=== Population ===
At the time of the 2006 National Census, the village's population was 406 in 108 households. The following census in 2011 counted 451 people in 107 households. The 2016 census measured the population of the village as 423 people in 122 households. It was the most populous village in its rural district.
