= Chaleh Sara =

Village in Gilan province, Iran

Chaleh Sara Persian: چاله سرا
- Village
- Location within Iran
- Coordinates: 37°24′41″N 49°05′35″E
- Country: Iran
- Province: Gilan
- County: Masal
- District: Shanderman
- Rural District: Shanderman

Population (2016)
  - Total: 808
- Time zone: UTC+3:30 (IRST)

Chaleh Sara (Persian: چاله سرا) (Note: Also romanized as Chāleh Sarā) is a village in Shanderman Rural District of Shanderman District in Masal County, Gilan province, Iran.

== Demographics ==
=== Population ===
At the time of the 2006 National Census, the village's population was 816 in 213 households. The following census in 2011 counted 924 people in 252 households. The 2016 census measured the population of the village as 808 people in 252 households. It was the most populous village in its rural district.
