= Dulkuh =

Dulkuh دول كوه
- Village
- Location within Iran
- Coordinates: 37°21′37″N 49°06′13″E
- Country: Iran
- Province: Gilan
- County: Masal
- Bakhsh: Central
- Rural District: Masal

Population (2016)
  - Total: 118
- Time zone: UTC+3:30 (IRST)

Dulkuh (Persian: دول كوه, also Romanized as Dūlkūh) is a village in Masal Rural District, in the Central District of Masal County, Gilan Province, Iran.

At the time of the 2006 National Census, the village's population was 134 in 36 households. The following census in 2011 counted 132 people in 37 households. The 2016 census measured the population of the village as 118 people in 45 households.
