= Galu Kuh =

Galu Kuh گلوكوه
- Village
- Location within Iran
- Coordinates: 37°25′31″N 49°02′56″E
- Country: Iran
- Province: Gilan
- County: Masal
- Bakhsh: Shanderman
- Rural District: Shanderman

Population (2006)
  - Total: 15
- Time zone: UTC+3:30 (IRST)
  - Summer (DST): UTC+4:30 (IRDT)

Galu Kuh (Persian: گلوكوه, also Romanized as Galū Kūh) is an Iranian village in Shanderman Rural District, Shanderman District, Masal County, Gilan Province. At the 2006 census, its population was 15, in 4 families.
