= Kurbar =

Kurbar كوربار
- Village
- Location within Iran
- Coordinates: 37°21′41″N 49°02′52″E
- Country: Iran
- Province: Gilan
- County: Masal
- Bakhsh: Central
- Rural District: Masal

Population (2016)
  - Total: 35
- Time zone: UTC+3:30 (IRST)

Kurbar (Persian: كوربار, also Romanized as Kūrbār; also known as Kūrbūr) is a village in Masal Rural District, in the Central District of Masal County, Gilan Province, Iran.

At the time of the 2006 National Census, the village's population was 183 in 41 households. The following census in 2011 counted 42 people in 10 households. The 2016 census measured the population of the village as 35 people in 8 households.
