= Boneh Sara =

Boneh Sara بنه سرا
- Village
- Location within Iran
- Coordinates: 37°24′55″N 49°07′04″E
- Country: Iran
- Province: Gilan
- County: Masal
- Bakhsh: Shanderman
- Rural District: Shanderman

Population (2006)
  - Total: 87
- Time zone: UTC+3:30 (IRST)
  - Summer (DST): UTC+4:30 (IRDT)

Boneh Sara (Persian: بنه سرا, also Romanized as Boneh Sarā; also known as Boneh Sar) is a village in Shanderman Rural District, Shanderman District, Masal County, in northwestern Iran's Gilan Province. At the 2006 census, the population of the village was 87, in 21 families.
