= Barg Sara =

Barg Sara برگسرا
- Village
- Location within Iran
- Coordinates: 37°25′39″N 49°09′44″E
- Country: Iran
- Province: Gilan
- County: Masal
- Bakhsh: Shanderman
- Rural District: Sheykh Neshin

Population (2016)
  - Total: 251
- Time zone: UTC+3:30 (IRST)

Barg Sara (Persian: برگسرا, also Romanized as Barg Sarā; also known as Bargeh Sarā) is a village in Sheykh Neshin Rural District, Shanderman District, Masal County, Gilan Province, Iran.

At the time of the 2006 National Census, the village's population was 278 in 63 households. The following census in 2011 counted 266 people in 65 households. The 2016 census measured the population of the village as 251 people in 87 households.
