= Qeran, Gilan =

Village in Gilan province, Iran

Qeran Persian: قران
- Village
- Location within Iran
- Coordinates: 37°24′55″N 49°08′44″E
- Country: Iran
- Province: Gilan
- County: Masal
- District: Shanderman
- Rural District: Sheykh Neshin

Population (2016)
  - Total: 533
- Time zone: UTC+3:30 (IRST)

Qeran (Persian: قران) (Note: Also romanized as Qerān) is a village in Sheykh Neshin Rural District of Shanderman District in Masal County, Gilan province, Iran.

== Demographics ==
=== Population ===
At the time of the 2006 National Census, the village's population was 559 in 140 households. The following census in 2011 counted 589 people in 163 households. The 2016 census measured the population of the village as 533 people in 190 households.
