= Kuban, Iran =

Kuban كوبن
- Village
- Country: Iran
- Province: Gilan
- County: Masal
- Bakhsh: Shanderman
- Rural District: Shanderman

Population (2006)
  - Total: 41
- Time zone: UTC+3:30 (IRST)
  - Summer (DST): UTC+4:30 (IRDT)

Kuban (Persian: كوبن, also Romanized as Kūban) is an Iranian village in Shanderman Rural District, Shanderman District, Masal County, Gilan Province. At the 2006 census, its population consisted of 41 inhabitants in 15 families.
