= Bitam, Iran =

Bitam بي تم
- Village
- Location within Iran
- Coordinates: 37°26′01″N 49°05′25″E
- Country: Iran
- Province: Gilan
- County: Masal
- Bakhsh: Shanderman
- Rural District: Shanderman

Population (2006)
  - Total: 377
- Time zone: UTC+3:30 (IRST)
  - Summer (DST): UTC+4:30 (IRDT)

Bitam (Persian: بي تم, also Romanized as Bītam) is a village in Shanderman Rural District, Shanderman District, Masal County, Gilan Province, Iran. At the 2006 census, the village population was 377, in 90 families.
