= Deran, Gilan =

Village in Gilan province, Iran

Deran Persian: دران
- Village
- Location within Iran
- Coordinates: 37°24′40″N 49°04′51″E
- Country: Iran
- Province: Gilan
- County: Masal
- District: Shanderman
- Rural District: Shanderman

Population (2016)
  - Total: 651
- Time zone: UTC+3:30 (IRST)

Deran (Persian: دران) (Note: Also romanized as Derān and Dar Ān) is a village in Shanderman Rural District of Shanderman District in Masal County, Gilan province, Iran.

== Demographics ==
=== Population ===
At the time of the 2006 National Census, the village's population was 797 in 174 households. The following census in 2011 counted 1,143 people in 250 households. The 2016 census measured the population of the village as 651 people in 207 households.
