= Churk Muzan =

Churk Muzan چورك موزان
- Village
- Location within Iran
- Coordinates: 37°26′19″N 48°57′30″E
- Country: Iran
- Province: Gilan
- County: Masal
- Bakhsh: Shanderman
- Rural District: Shanderman

Population (2006)
  - Total: 26
- Time zone: UTC+3:30 (IRST)
  - Summer (DST): UTC+4:30 (IRDT)

Churk Muzan (Persian: چورك موزان, also Romanized as Chūrk Mūzān; also known as Chūrkeh Mūzan) is an Iranian village in Shanderman Rural District, Shanderman District, Masal County, Gilan Province. At the 2006 census, its population was 26, in 6 families.
