= Sheykh Neshin =

Village in Gilan province, Iran

Sheykh Neshin Persian: شيخ نشين
- Village
- Location within Iran
- Coordinates: 37°27′22″N 49°08′01″E
- Country: Iran
- Province: Gilan
- County: Masal
- District: Shanderman
- Rural District: Sheykh Neshin

Population (2016)
  - Total: 631
- Time zone: UTC+3:30 (IRST)

Sheykh Neshin (Persian: شيخ نشين) (Note: Also romanized as Sheykh Neshīn; also known as Shekhshin) is a village in, and the capital of, Sheykh Neshin Rural District in Shanderman District of Masal County, in Iran's Gilan province.

== Demographics ==
=== Population ===
At the time of the 2006 National Census, the village's population was 740 in 207 households. The following census in 2011 counted 775 people in 221 households. The 2016 census measured the population of the village as 631 people in 209 households.
