= Seyyed Mahalleh, Masal =

Village in Gilan province, Iran

Seyyed Mahalleh Persian: سيدمحله
- Village
- Location within Iran
- Coordinates: 37°18′50″N 49°09′38″E
- Country: Iran
- Province: Gilan
- County: Masal
- District: Central
- Rural District: Howmeh

Population (2016)
  - Total: 204
- Time zone: UTC+3:30 (IRST)

Seyyed Mahalleh (Persian: سيدمحله) (Note: Also romanized as Seyyed Maḩalleh) is a village in Howmeh Rural District of the Central District in Masal County, Gilan province, Iran.

== Demographics ==
=== Population ===
At the time of the 2006 National Census, the village's population was 168 in 53 households. The following census in 2011 counted 241 people in 77 households. The 2016 census measured the population of the village as 204 people in 69 households.
