= Chapeh Zad =

Village in Gilan province, Iran

Chapeh Zad Persian: چپه زاد
- Village
- Location within Iran
- Coordinates: 37°25′22″N 49°06′24″E
- Country: Iran
- Province: Gilan
- County: Masal
- District: Shanderman
- Rural District: Shanderman

Population (2016)
  - Total: 497
- Time zone: UTC+3:30 (IRST)

Chapeh Zad (Persian: چپه زاد) (Note: Also romanized as Chapeh Zād; also known as Chapeh Zāt) is a village in Shanderman Rural District of Shanderman District in Masal County, Gilan province, Iran.

== Demographics ==
=== Population ===
At the time of the 2006 National Census, the village's population was 552 in 126 households. The following census in 2011 counted 516 people in 144 households. The 2016 census measured the population of the village as 497 people in 151 households.
