= Razin Dul =

Razin Dul رزين دول
- Village
- Location within Iran
- Coordinates: 37°22′56″N 49°05′21″E
- Country: Iran
- Province: Gilan
- County: Masal
- Bakhsh: Shanderman
- Rural District: Shanderman

Population (2006)
  - Total: 95
- Time zone: UTC+3:30 (IRST)
  - Summer (DST): UTC+4:30 (IRDT)

Razin Dul (Persian: رزين دول, also Romanized as Razīn Dūl; also known as Zarrīn Dūl) is an Iranian village in Shanderman Rural District, Shanderman District, Masal County, Gilan Province. At the 2006 census, its population comprised 95 residents, in 28 families.
