= Varmiyeh =

Village in Gilan province, Iran

Varmiyeh Persian: ورميه
- Village
- Location within Iran
- Coordinates: 37°19′37″N 49°05′51″E
- Country: Iran
- Province: Gilan
- County: Masal
- District: Central
- Rural District: Masal

Population (2016)
  - Total: 266
- Time zone: UTC+3:30 (IRST)

Varmiyeh (Persian: ورميه) (Note: Also romanized as Varmīyeh; also known as Varmīneh and Vīrmeh) is a village in Masal Rural District of the Central District in Masal County, Gilan province, Iran.

== Demographics ==
=== Population ===
At the time of the 2006 National Census, the village's population was 307 in 86 households. The following census in 2011 counted 286 people in 92 households. The 2016 census measured the population of the village as 266 people in 98 households.
