= Tuseh Sara =

Village in Gilan province, Iran

Tuseh Sara Persian: توسه سرا
- Village
- Location within Iran
- Coordinates: 37°24′56″N 49°08′27″E
- Country: Iran
- Province: Gilan
- County: Masal
- District: Shanderman
- Rural District: Sheykh Neshin

Population (2016)
  - Total: 725
- Time zone: UTC+3:30 (IRST)

Tuseh Sara (Persian: توسه سرا) (Note: Also romanized as Tūseh Sarā) is a village in Sheykh Neshin Rural District of Shanderman District in Masal County, Gilan province, Iran.

== Demographics ==
=== Population ===
At the time of the 2006 National Census, the village's population was 569 in 134 households. The following census in 2011 counted 717 people in 187 households. The 2016 census measured the population of the village as 725 people in 212 households.
