= Salimabad, Gilan =

Salimabad سليم آباد
- Village
- Location within Iran
- Coordinates: 37°18′30″N 49°00′40″E
- Country: Iran
- Province: Gilan
- County: Masal
- Bakhsh: Central
- Rural District: Masal

Population (2016)
  - Total: 82
- Time zone: UTC+3:30 (IRST)

Salimabad (Persian: سليم آباد, also Romanized as Salīmābād) is a village in Masal Rural District, in the Central District of Masal County, Gilan Province, Iran.

At the time of the 2006 National Census, the village's population was 122 in 29 households. The following census in 2011 counted 108 people in 31 households. The 2016 census measured the population of the village as 82 people in 27 households.
