= Khoshkeh Darya =

Khoshkeh Darya خشكه دريا
- Village
- Location within Iran
- Coordinates: 37°19′40″N 48°52′13″E
- Country: Iran
- Province: Gilan
- County: Masal
- Bakhsh: Shanderman
- Rural District: Shanderman

Population (2006)
  - Total: 5
- Time zone: UTC+3:30 (IRST)
  - Summer (DST): UTC+4:30 (IRDT)

Khoshkeh Darya (Persian: خشكه دريا, also Romanized as Khoshkeh Daryā) is an Iranian village in Shanderman Rural District, Shanderman District, Masal County, Gilan Province. At the 2006 census, the village count consisted of only 5 inhabitants.
