= Boruj Rah =

Boruj Rah بروج راه
- Village
- Location within Iran
- Coordinates: 37°22′55″N 49°04′16″E
- Country: Iran
- Province: Gilan
- County: Masal
- Bakhsh: Shanderman
- Rural District: Shanderman

Population (2006)
  - Total: 24
- Time zone: UTC+3:30 (IRST)
  - Summer (DST): UTC+4:30 (IRDT)

Boruj Rah (Persian: بروج راه, also Romanized as Borūj Rāh; also known as Bojrā and Borj Rāh) is a village in Shanderman Rural District, Shanderman District, Masal County, in Iran's Gilan Province. At the 2006 census, the village had 24 inhabitants, in 5 families.
