= Lipa, Iran =

Village in Gilan province, Iran

Lipa Persian: ليپا
- Village
- Location within Iran
- Coordinates: 37°20′24″N 49°05′19″E
- Country: Iran
- Province: Gilan
- County: Masal
- District: Central
- Rural District: Masal

Population (2016)
  - Total: 261
- Time zone: UTC+3:30 (IRST)

Lipa (Persian: ليپا) (Note: Also romanized as Līpā) is a village in Masal Rural District of the Central District in Masal County, Gilan province, Iran.

== Demographics ==
=== Population ===
At the time of the 2006 National Census, the village's population was 291 in 78 households. The following census in 2011 counted 279 people in 74 households. The 2016 census measured the population of the village as 261 people in 82 households.
