= Kuchkam =

Village in Gilan province, Iran

Kuchkam Persian: كوچكام
- Village
- Location within Iran
- Coordinates: 37°19′46″N 49°09′13″E
- Country: Iran
- Province: Gilan
- County: Masal
- District: Central
- Rural District: Howmeh

Population (2016)
  - Total: 547
- Time zone: UTC+3:30 (IRST)

Kuchkam (Persian: كوچكام) (Note: Also romanized as Kūchkām) is a village in, and the capital of, Howmeh Rural District in the Central District of Masal County, Gilan province, Iran.

== Demographics ==
=== Population ===
At the time of the 2006 National Census, the village's population was 520 in 142 households. The following census in 2011 counted 584 people in 176 households. The 2016 census measured the population of the village as 547 in 184 households.
