= Emamzadeh Shafi =

Emamzadeh Shafi امامزاده شفيع
- Village
- Location within Iran
- Coordinates: 37°23′58″N 49°02′52″E
- Country: Iran
- Province: Gilan
- County: Masal
- Bakhsh: Shanderman
- Rural District: Shanderman

Population (2006)
  - Total: 435
- Time zone: UTC+3:30 (IRST)
  - Summer (DST): UTC+4:30 (IRDT)

Emamzadeh Shafi (Persian: امامزاده شفيع, also Romanized as Emāmzādeh Shafīʿ) is an Iranian village in Shanderman Rural District, Shanderman District, Masal County, Gilan Province. At the 2006 census, its population comprised 435 inhabitants, in 105 families.
