= Chit Bon =

Chit Bon چيت بن
- Village
- Location within Iran
- Coordinates: 37°26′27″N 49°04′11″E
- Country: Iran
- Province: Gilan
- County: Masal
- Bakhsh: Shanderman
- Rural District: Shanderman

Population (2006)
  - Total: 97
- Time zone: UTC+3:30 (IRST)
  - Summer (DST): UTC+4:30 (IRDT)

Chit Bon (Persian: چيت بن, also Romanized as Chīt Bon; also known as Chat Bon) is a village in Shanderman Rural District, Shanderman District, Masal County, in Iran's Gilan Province. At the 2006 census, the village population was 97, in 22 families.
