= Tutnesa =

Village in Gilan province, Iran

Tutnesa Persian: توت نساء
- Village
- Location within Iran
- Coordinates: 37°19′40″N 49°02′31″E
- Country: Iran
- Province: Gilan
- County: Masal
- District: Central
- Rural District: Masal

Population (2016)
  - Total: 212
- Time zone: UTC+3:30 (IRST)

Tutnesa (Persian: توت نساء) (Note: Also romanized as Tūtnesā’) is a village in Masal Rural District of the Central District in Masal County, Gilan province, Iran.

== Demographics ==
=== Population ===
At the time of the 2006 National Census, the village's population was 278 in 62 households. The following census in 2011 counted 265 people in 70 households. The 2016 census measured the population of the village as 212 people in 64 households.
