= Gaskaminjan =

Village in Gilan province, Iran

Gaskaminjan Persian: گسكمينجان
- Village
- Location within Iran
- Coordinates: 37°27′06″N 49°05′40″E
- Country: Iran
- Province: Gilan
- County: Masal
- District: Shanderman
- Rural District: Shanderman

Population (2016)
  - Total: 646
- Time zone: UTC+3:30 (IRST)

Gaskaminjan (Persian: گسكمينجان) (Note: Also romanized as Gaskamīnjān; also known as Gasgamīnjān and Gīsgamīn Jān) is a village in Shanderman Rural District of Shanderman District in Masal County, Gilan province, Iran.

== Demographics ==
=== Population ===
At the time of the 2006 National Census, the village's population was 558 in 126 households. The following census in 2011 counted 658 people in 175 households. The 2016 census measured the population of the village as 646 people in 200 households.
