= Owlom =

Village in Gilan province, Iran

Owlom Persian: اولم
- Village
- Location within Iran
- Coordinates: 37°27′22″N 49°04′57″E
- Country: Iran
- Province: Gilan
- County: Masal
- District: Shanderman
- Rural District: Shanderman

Population (2016)
  - Total: 700
- Time zone: UTC+3:30 (IRST)

Owlom (Persian: اولم) (Note: Also romanized as Ūlom) is a village in Shanderman Rural District of Shanderman District in Masal County, Gilan province, Iran.

== Demographics ==
=== Population ===
At the time of the 2006 National Census, the village's population was 652 in 161 households. The following census in 2011 counted 709 people in 195 households. The 2016 census measured the population of the village as 700 people in 220 households.
