= Khaneqah Bar =

Village in Gilan province, Iran

Khaneqah Bar Persian: خانقاه بر
- Village
- Location within Iran
- Coordinates: 37°22′44″N 49°09′55″E
- Country: Iran
- Province: Gilan
- County: Masal
- District: Central
- Rural District: Howmeh

Population (2016)
  - Total: 679
- Time zone: UTC+3:30 (IRST)

Khaneqah Bar (Persian: خانقاه بر) (Note: Also romanized as Khāneqāh Bar; also known as Chamūsh Maḩalleh and Khāneqāh) is a village in Howmeh Rural District of the Central District in Masal County, Gilan province, Iran.

== Demographics ==
=== Population ===
At the time of the 2006 National Census, the village's population was 690 in 183 households. The following census in 2011 counted 757 people in 227 households. The 2016 census measured the population of the village as 679 people in 230 households.
