= Gileh Sara =

Village in Gilan province, Iran

Gileh Sara Persian: گيله سرا
- Village
- Location within Iran
- Coordinates: 37°23′12″N 49°07′31″E
- Country: Iran
- Province: Gilan
- County: Masal
- District: Central
- Rural District: Howmeh

Population (2016)
  - Total: 622
- Time zone: UTC+3:30 (IRST)

Gileh Sara (Persian: گيله سرا) (Note: Also romanized as Gīleh Sarā) is a village in Howmeh Rural District of the Central District in Masal County, Gilan province, Iran.

== Demographics ==
=== Population ===
At the time of the 2006 National Census, the village's population was 683 in 173 households. The following census in 2011 counted 696 people in 199 households. The 2016 census measured the population of the village as 622 people in 194 households.
