= Palang Sara =

Palang Sara پلنگ سرا
- Village
- Location within Iran
- Coordinates: 37°25′40″N 49°05′30″E
- Country: Iran
- Province: Gilan
- County: Masal
- Bakhsh: Shanderman
- Rural District: Shanderman

Population (2006)
  - Total: 179
- Time zone: UTC+3:30 (IRST)
  - Summer (DST): UTC+4:30 (IRDT)

Palang Sara (Persian: پلنگ سرا, also Romanized as Palang Sarā) is a village in the northwestern Iranian province of Gilan. The village lies in Shanderman Rural District, Shanderman District of Masal County. At the 2006 census, its population was 179, in 45 families.
