= Gantin =

Gantin is a surname. Notable people with this surname include:

- Bernardin Gantin (1922–2008), Beninese cardinal of the Roman Catholic Church
- Camih Epiphanie Gantin, a beauty pageant titleholder who was crowned Miss Togo 2012

== See also ==
- Gand (disambiguation)
- Gant (surname)
