= Mir Mahalleh, Masal =

Village in Gilan province, Iran

Mir Mahalleh Persian: ميرمحله
- Village
- Location within Iran
- Country: Iran
- Province: Gilan
- County: Masal
- District: Central
- Rural District: Masal

Population (2016)
  - Total: 319
- Time zone: UTC+3:30 (IRST)

Mir Mahalleh (Persian: ميرمحله) (Note: Also romanized as Mīr Maḩalleh; also known as Mīr Maḩal) is a village in Masal Rural District of the Central District in Masal County, Gilan province, Iran.

== Demographics ==
=== Population ===
At the time of the 2006 National Census, the village's population was 390 in 114 households. The following census in 2011 counted 365 people in 110 households. The 2016 census measured the population of the village as 319 people in 107 households.
