= Sarakeh =

Village in Gilan province, Iran

Sarakeh Persian: سراكه
- Village
- Location within Iran
- Coordinates: 37°19′54″N 49°03′59″E
- Country: Iran
- Province: Gilan
- County: Masal
- District: Central
- Rural District: Masal

Population (2016)
  - Total: 307
- Time zone: UTC+3:30 (IRST)

Sarakeh (Persian: سراكه) (Note: Also romanized as Sarākeh) is a village in Masal Rural District of the Central District in Masal County, Gilan province, Iran.

== Demographics ==
=== Population ===
At the time of the 2006 National Census, the village's population was 306 in 78 households. The following census in 2011 counted 301 people in 93 households. The 2016 census measured the population of the village as 307 people in 103 households.
