= Tabaq Sar =

Tabaq Sar طبق سر
- Village
- Interactive map of Tabaq Sar
- Coordinates: 37.335°N 49.059°E
- Country: Iran
- Province: Gilan
- County: Masal
- Bakhsh: Central
- Rural District: Masal

Population (2016)
  - Total: 146
- Time zone: UTC+3:30 (IRST)

Tabaq Sar (Persian: طبق سر, also Romanized as Ţabaq Sar) is a village in Masal Rural District, in the Central District of Masal County, Gilan Province, Iran.

At the time of the 2006 National Census, the village's population was 194 in 44 households. The following census in 2011 counted 155 people in 42 households. The 2016 census measured the population of the village as 146 people in 46 households.
