= Pashed =

Pashed پشد
- Village
- Location within Iran
- Coordinates: 37°25′19″N 49°05′21″E
- Country: Iran
- Province: Gilan
- County: Masal
- Bakhsh: Shanderman
- Rural District: Shanderman

Population (2006)
  - Total: 189
- Time zone: UTC+3:30 (IRST)
  - Summer (DST): UTC+4:30 (IRDT)

Pashed (Persian: پشد; also known as Pashed Nīlāzh) is a village in Shanderman Rural District, Shanderman District, Masal County, Gilan Province, Iran. At the 2006 census, its population was 189, in 49 families.
