= Chay Khaleh =

Chay Khaleh چاي خاله
- Village
- Location within Iran
- Coordinates: 37°25′34″N 48°55′55″E
- Country: Iran
- Province: Gilan
- County: Masal
- Bakhsh: Shanderman
- Rural District: Shanderman

Population (2006)
  - Total: 66
- Time zone: UTC+3:30 (IRST)
  - Summer (DST): UTC+4:30 (IRDT)

Chay Khaleh (Persian: چاي خاله, also Romanized as Chāy Khāleh) is a village in Shanderman Rural District, Shanderman District, Masal County, in Iran's Gilan Province. At the 2006 census, the village population comprised 66 inhabitants, in 15 families.
