= Siah Mard =

Village in Gilan province, Iran

Siah Mard Persian: سياه مرد
- Village
- Location within Iran
- Coordinates: 37°24′02″N 49°06′10″E
- Country: Iran
- Province: Gilan
- County: Masal
- District: Shanderman
- Rural District: Shanderman

Population (2016)
  - Total: 764
- Time zone: UTC+3:30 (IRST)

Siah Mard (Persian: سياه مرد) (Note: Also romanized as Sīāh Mard) is a village in Shanderman Rural District of Shanderman District in Masal County, Gilan province, Iran.

== Demographics ==
=== Population ===
At the time of the 2006 National Census, the village's population was 819 in 197 households. The following census in 2011 counted 803 people in 236 households. The 2016 census measured the population of the village as 764 people in 236 households.
