= Gavmishban =

Village in Gilan province, Iran

Gavmishban Persian: گاوميشبان
- Village
- Location within Iran
- Coordinates: 37°20′10″N 49°10′04″E
- Country: Iran
- Province: Gilan
- County: Masal
- District: Central
- Rural District: Howmeh

Population (2016)
  - Total: 335
- Time zone: UTC+3:30 (IRST)

Gavmishban (Persian: گاوميشبان) (Note: Also romanized as Gāvmīshbān; also known as Gāmīshbān) is a village in Howmeh Rural District of the Central District in Masal County, Gilan province, Iran.

== Demographics ==
=== Population ===
At the time of the 2006 National Census, the village's population was 368 in 93 households. The following census in 2011 counted 389 people in 111 households. The 2016 census measured the population of the village as 335 people in 114 households.
