= Darkhaneh =

Darkhaneh (Persian: درخانه) may refer to:

- Darkhaneh, Gilan
- Darkhaneh, Talesh, Gilan Province
- Darkhaneh, Hormozgan
