= Kharf Kureh =

Village in Gilan province, Iran

Kharf Kureh Persian: خرف كوره
- Village
- Location within Iran
- Coordinates: 37°25′39″N 49°07′24″E
- Country: Iran
- Province: Gilan
- County: Masal
- District: Shanderman
- Rural District: Shanderman

Population (2016)
  - Total: 560
- Time zone: UTC+3:30 (IRST)

Kharf Kureh (Persian: خرف كوره) (Note: Also romanized as Kharf Kūreh; also known as Kharfeh Kūreh) is a village in Shanderman Rural District of Shanderman District in Masal County, Gilan province, Iran.

== Demographics ==
=== Population ===
At the time of the 2006 National Census, the village's population was 488 in 120 households. The following census in 2011 counted 527 people in 150 households. The 2016 census measured the population of the village as 560 people in 179 households.
