= Lang, Iran =

Village in Gilan province, Iran

Lang Persian: لنگ
- Village
- Location within Iran
- Coordinates: 37.355°N 49.121°E
- Country: Iran
- Province: Gilan
- County: Masal
- District: Central
- Rural District: Howmeh

Population (2016)
  - Total: 138
- Time zone: UTC+3:30 (IRST)

Lang (Persian: لنگ) is a village in Howmeh Rural District of the Central District in Masal County, Gilan province, Iran.

== Demographics ==
=== Population ===
At the time of the 2006 National Census, the village's population was 458 in 121 households. The following census in 2011 counted 102 people in 30 households. The 2016 census measured the population of the village as 138 people in 45 households.
