= Chamush Duzan =

Chamush Duzan چموش دوزان
- Village
- Location within Iran
- Coordinates: 37°26′50″N 49°08′05″E
- Country: Iran
- Province: Gilan
- County: Masal
- Bakhsh: Shanderman
- Rural District: Sheykh Neshin

Population (2016)
  - Total: 174
- Time zone: UTC+3:30 (IRST)

Chamush Duzan (Persian: چموش دوزان, also Romanized as Chamūsh Dūzān) is a village in Sheykh Neshin Rural District, Shanderman District, Masal County, Gilan Province, Iran.

At the time of the 2006 National Census, the village's population was 191 in 48 households. The following census in 2011 counted 187 people in 58 households. The 2016 census measured the population of the village as 174 people in 63 households.
