= Khorum =

Khorum خروم
- Village
- Location within Iran
- Coordinates: 37°18′30″N 49°01′35″E
- Country: Iran
- Province: Gilan
- County: Masal
- Bakhsh: Central
- Rural District: Masal

Population (2016)
  - Total: 74
- Time zone: UTC+3:30 (IRST)

Khorum (Persian: خروم, also Romanized as Khorūm) is a village in Masal Rural District, in the Central District of Masal County, Gilan Province, Iran.

At the time of the 2006 National Census, the village's population was 109 in 26 households. The following census in 2011 counted 97 people in 30 households. The 2016 census measured the population of the village as 74 people in 24 households.
