= Shanderman =

Shanderman (Persian: شاندرمن) may refer to:

- Shanderman District
- Shanderman Rural District
