= Pashkam =

Village in Gilan province, Iran

Pashkam Persian: پاشكم
- Village
- Location within Iran
- Coordinates: 37°23′21″N 49°07′58″E
- Country: Iran
- Province: Gilan
- County: Masal
- District: Shanderman
- Rural District: Shanderman

Population (2016)
  - Total: 753
- Time zone: UTC+3:30 (IRST)

Pashkam (Persian: پاشكم) (Note: Also romanized as Pāshkam; also known as Pashkum) is a village in Shanderman Rural District of Shanderman District in Masal County, Gilan province, Iran.

== Demographics ==
=== Population ===
At the time of the 2006 National Census, the village's population was 852 in 228 households. The census in 2011 counted 906 people in 237 households. The 2016 census measured the population of the village as 753 people in 235 households.
