= Kofud Mozhdeh =

Kofud Mozhdeh كفودمژده
- Village
- Location within Iran
- Coordinates: 37°24′59″N 49°05′42″E
- Country: Iran
- Province: Gilan
- County: Masal
- Bakhsh: Shanderman
- Rural District: Shanderman

Population (2006)
  - Total: 390
- Time zone: UTC+3:30 (IRST)
  - Summer (DST): UTC+4:30 (IRDT)

Kofud Mozhdeh (Persian: كفودمژده, also Romanized as Kofūd Mozhdeh) is an Iranian village in Shanderman Rural District, Shanderman District, Masal County, Gilan Province. At the 2006 census, its population was 390, in 85 families.
