= Kureh Jan =

Kureh Jan كوره جان
- Village
- Location within Iran
- Coordinates: 37°27′13″N 49°07′01″E
- Country: Iran
- Province: Gilan
- County: Masal
- Bakhsh: Shanderman
- Rural District: Sheykh Neshin

Population (2016)
  - Total: 239
- Time zone: UTC+3:30 (IRST)

Kureh Jan (Persian: كوره جان, also Romanized as Kūreh Jān) is a village in Sheykh Neshin Rural District, Shanderman District, Masal County, Gilan Province, Iran.

At the time of the 2006 National Census, the village's population was 277 in 80 households. The following census in 2011 counted 270 people in 82 households. The 2016 census measured the population of the village as 239 people in 79 households.
