= Veshmeh Sara =

Village in Gilan province, Iran

Veshmeh Sara Persian: وشمه سرا
- Village
- Location within Iran
- Coordinates: 37°20′16″N 49°07′51″E
- Country: Iran
- Province: Gilan
- County: Masal
- District: Central
- Rural District: Howmeh

Population (2016)
  - Total: 1,186
- Time zone: UTC+3:30 (IRST)

Veshmeh Sara (Persian: وشمه سرا) (Note: Also romanized as Veshmeh Sarā) is a village in Howmeh Rural District of the Central District in Masal County, Gilan province, Iran.

== Demographics ==
=== Population ===
At the time of the 2006 National Census, the village's population was 1,213 in 308 households. The following census in 2011 counted 1,386 people in 408 households. The 2016 census measured the population of the village as 1,186 people in 395 households. It was the most populous village in its rural district.
