= Masheh Kah =

Masheh Kah مشه كه
- Village
- Country: Iran
- Province: Gilan
- County: Masal
- Bakhsh: Shanderman
- Rural District: Shanderman

Population (2006)
  - Total: 113
- Time zone: UTC+3:30 (IRST)
  - Summer (DST): UTC+4:30 (IRDT)

Masheh Kah (Persian: مشه كه) is an Iranian village in Shanderman Rural District, Shanderman District, Masal County, Gilan Province. At the 2006 census, the village population comprised 113 inhabitants, in 29 families.
