= Anjilan =

Anjilan انجيلان
- Village
- Location within Iran
- Coordinates: 37°26′17″N 49°07′15″E
- Country: Iran
- Province: Gilan
- County: Masal
- Bakhsh: Shanderman
- Rural District: Shanderman

Population (2006)
  - Total: 208
- Time zone: UTC+3:30 (IRST)
  - Summer (DST): UTC+4:30 (IRDT)

Anjilan (Persian: انجيلان, also Romanized as Anjīlān) is a village in Shanderman Rural District, Shanderman District, Masal County in Iran's Gilan Province. At the 2006 census, its population was 208, in 53 families.
