= Tabar Sara =

Tabar Sara تبرسرا
- Village
- Location within Iran
- Coordinates: 37°20′16″N 49°06′21″E
- Country: Iran
- Province: Gilan
- County: Masal
- Bakhsh: Central
- Rural District: Masal

Population (2016)
  - Total: 138
- Time zone: UTC+3:30 (IRST)

Tabar Sara (Persian: تبرسرا, also Romanized as Tabar Sarā; also known as Ţabarsā) is a village in Masal Rural District, in the Central District of Masal County, Gilan Province, Iran.

At the time of the 2006 National Census, the village's population was 160 in 43 households. The following census in 2011 counted 143 people in 43 households. The 2016 census measured the population of the village as 138 people in 49 households.
