= Khvod Bechar =

Village in Gilan province, Iran

Khvod Bechar Persian: خودبچر
- Village
- Location within Iran
- Coordinates: 37°22′43″N 49°09′10″E
- Country: Iran
- Province: Gilan
- County: Masal
- District: Central
- Rural District: Howmeh

Population (2016)
  - Total: 602
- Time zone: UTC+3:30 (IRST)

Khvod Bechar (Persian: خودبچر) (Note: Also romanized as Khowd Bechar) is a village in Howmeh Rural District of the Central District in Masal County, Gilan province, Iran.

== Demographics ==
=== Population ===
At the time of the 2006 National Census, the village's population was 691 in 180 households. The following census in 2011 counted 675 people in 205 households. The 2016 census measured the population of the village as 602 people in 202 households.
