= Zarabcheh =

Zarabachi زرابچی
- Village
- Location within Iran
- Coordinates: 37°25′40″N 49°06′03″E
- Country: Iran
- Province: Gilan
- County: Masal
- Bakhsh: Shanderman
- Rural District: Shanderman

Population (2006)
  - Total: 176
- Time zone: UTC+3:30 (IRST)
  - Summer (DST): UTC+4:30 (IRDT)

Zarabachi (Persian: زرابچی, also Romanized as Zarābachi; also known as Z̧ohrābchī) is a village in Shanderman Rural District, Shanderman District, Masal County, Gilan Province, Iran. Its population was 176 inhabitants, in 48 families, at the 2006 census.
