= Khalavarjan =

Khalavarjan خلورجان
- Village
- Location within Iran
- Coordinates: 37°26′38″N 49°06′59″E
- Country: Iran
- Province: Gilan
- County: Masal
- Bakhsh: Shanderman
- Rural District: Sheykh Neshin

Population (2016)
  - Total: 183
- Time zone: UTC+3:30 (IRST)

Khalavarjan (Persian: خلورجان, also Romanized as Khalavarjān; also known as Khalah Varjān) is a village in Sheykh Neshin Rural District, Shanderman District, Masal County, Gilan Province, Iran.

At the time of the 2006 National Census, the village's population was 185 in 23 households. The following census in 2011 counted 211 people in 66 households. The 2016 census measured the population of the village as 184 people in 62 households.
