= Molk Bogur =

Molk Bogur ملک بگور
- Village
- Location within Iran
- Coordinates: 37°27′02″N 49°08′33″E
- Country: Iran
- Province: Gilan
- County: Masal
- Bakhsh: Shanderman
- Rural District: Sheykh Neshin

Population (2016)
  - Total: 68
- Time zone: UTC+3:30 (IRST)

Molk Bogur (Persian: ملک بگور, also Romanized as Molk Bogūr) is a village in Sheykh Neshin Rural District, Shanderman District, Masal County, Gilan Province, Iran.

At the time of the 2006 National Census, the village's population was 82 in 19 households. The following census in 2011 counted 63 people in 18 households. The 2016 census measured the population of the village as 68 people in 26 households.
