= Mehdikhan Mahalleh =

Village in Gilan province, Iran

Mehdikhan Mahalleh Persian: مهديخان محله
- Village
- Location within Iran
- Coordinates: 37°20′44″N 49°07′29″E
- Country: Iran
- Province: Gilan
- County: Masal
- District: Central
- Rural District: Masal

Population (2016)
  - Total: 388
- Time zone: UTC+3:30 (IRST)

Mehdikhan Mahalleh (Persian: مهديخان محله) (Note: Also romanized as Mehdīkhān Maḩalleh; also known as Karmalāt and Mehdī Maḩalleh) is a village in Masal Rural District of the Central District in Masal County, Gilan province, Iran.

== Demographics ==
=== Population ===
At the time of the 2006 National Census, the village's population was 434 in 124 households. The following census in 2011 counted 426 people in 124 households. The 2016 census measured the population of the village as 388 people in 126 households.
