= Siah Duleh =

Village in Gilan province, Iran

Siah Duleh Persian: سياه دوله
- Village
- Location within Iran
- Coordinates: 37°25′44″N 49°07′48″E
- Country: Iran
- Province: Gilan
- County: Masal
- District: Shanderman
- Rural District: Sheykh Neshin

Population (2016)
  - Total: 474
- Time zone: UTC+3:30 (IRST)

Siah Duleh (Persian: سياه دوله) (Note: Also romanized as Sīāh Dūleh; also known as Sīāh Daleh) is a village in Sheykh Neshin Rural District of Shanderman District in Masal County, Gilan province, Iran.

== Demographics ==
=== Population ===
At the time of the 2006 National Census, the village's population was 520 in 141 households. The following census in 2011 counted 521 people in 146 households. The 2016 census measured the population of the village as 474 people in 150 households.
