= Estalkh Zir =

Village in Gilan province, Iran

Estalkh Zir Persian: اسطلخ زير
- Village
- Location within Iran
- Coordinates: 37°27′31″N 49°06′00″E
- Country: Iran
- Province: Gilan
- County: Masal
- District: Shanderman
- Rural District: Sheykh Neshin

Population (2016)
  - Total: 803
- Time zone: UTC+3:30 (IRST)

Estalkh Zir (Persian: اسطلخ زير) (Note: Also romanized as Esţalkh Zīr; also known as Seleh Cher) is a village in Sheykh Neshin Rural District of Shanderman District in Masal County, Gilan province, Iran.

== Demographics ==
=== Population ===
At the time of the 2006 National Census, the village's population was 815 in 218 households. The following census in 2011 counted 831 people in 233 households. The 2016 census measured the population of the village as 803 people in 267 households. It was the most populous village in its rural district.
