= Markiyeh, Masal =

Village in Gilan province, Iran

Markiyeh Persian: مركيه
- Village
- Location within Iran
- Coordinates: 37°21′05″N 49°06′18″E
- Country: Iran
- Province: Gilan
- County: Masal
- District: Central
- Rural District: Howmeh

Population (2016)
  - Total: 664
- Time zone: UTC+3:30 (IRST)

Markiyeh (Persian: مركيه) (Note: Also romanized as Markīyeh) is a village in Howmeh Rural District of the Central District in Masal County, Gilan province, Iran.

== Demographics ==
=== Population ===
At the time of the 2006 National Census, the village's population was 739 in 190 households. The following census in 2011 counted 785 people in 223 households. The 2016 census measured the population of the village as 664 people in 214 households.
