= Masuleh Khani =

Masuleh Khani ماسوله خانی
- Village
- Location within Iran
- Coordinates: 37°21′21″N 48°58′42″E
- Country: Iran
- Province: Gilan
- County: Masal
- Bakhsh: Central
- Rural District: Masal

Population (2016)
  - Total: 55
- Time zone: UTC+3:30 (IRST)

Masuleh Khani (Persian: ماسوله خانی, also Romanized as Māsūleh Khānī and Māsūlehkhānī) is a village in Masal Rural District, in the Central District of Masal County, Gilan Province, Iran.

At the time of the 2006 National Census, the village's population was 91 in 17 households. The following census in 2011 counted 70 people in 20 households. The 2016 census measured the population of the village as 55 people in 22 households.
