= Lir, Masal =

Lir لير
- Village
- Interactive map of Lir
- Coordinates: 37.332°N 49.0745°E
- Country: Iran
- Province: Gilan
- County: Masal
- Bakhsh: Central
- Rural District: Masal

Population (2016)
  - Total: 32
- Time zone: UTC+3:30 (IRST)

Lir (Persian: لير, also Romanized as Līr) is a village in Masal Rural District, in the Central District of Masal County, Gilan Province, Iran.

At the time of the 2006 National Census, the village's population was 44 in 11 households. The following census in 2011 counted 41 people in 11 households. The 2016 census measured the population of the village as 32 people in 11 households.
