= Mir Mahalleh, Shanderman =

Village in Gilan province, Iran

Mir Mahalleh Persian: ميرمحله
- Village
- Location within Iran
- Coordinates: 37°25′50″N 49°08′52″E
- Country: Iran
- Province: Gilan
- County: Masal
- District: Shanderman
- Rural District: Sheykh Neshin

Population (2016)
  - Total: 330
- Time zone: UTC+3:30 (IRST)

Mir Mahalleh (Persian: ميرمحله) (Note: Also romanized as Mīr Maḩalleh) is a village in Sheykh Neshin Rural District of Shanderman District in Masal County, Gilan province, Iran.

== Demographics ==
=== Population ===
At the time of the 2006 National Census, the village's population was 450 in 114 households. The following census in 2011 counted 374 people in 106 households. The 2016 census measured the population of the village as 330 people in 123 households.
