= Hajji Bijar va Jas Ganas =

Hajji Bijar va Jas Ganas حاجي بيجاروجاس گنس
- Village
- Location within Iran
- Coordinates: 37°26′00″N 49°03′11″E
- Country: Iran
- Province: Gilan
- County: Masal
- Bakhsh: Shanderman
- Rural District: Shanderman

Population (2006)
  - Total: 45
- Time zone: UTC+3:30 (IRST)
  - Summer (DST): UTC+4:30 (IRDT)

Hajji Bijar va Jas Ganas (Persian: حاجي بيجاروجاس گنس, also romanized as Ḩājjī Bījār va Jās Ganas; also known as Ḩājjī Bījār) is an Iranian village in Shanderman Rural District, Shanderman District, Masal County, Gilan Province. At the 2006 census, its population was 45, in 9 families.
