= Kishkhani =

Village in Gilan province, Iran

Kishkhani Persian: كيشخاني
- Village
- Location within Iran
- Coordinates: 37°19′36″N 49°07′00″E
- Country: Iran
- Province: Gilan
- County: Masal
- District: Central
- Rural District: Howmeh

Population (2016)
  - Total: 185
- Time zone: UTC+3:30 (IRST)

Kishkhani (Persian: كيشخاني) (Note: Also romanized as Kīshkhānī; also known as Kisheh Khani, also romanized as Kīsheh Khānī) is a village in Howmeh Rural District of the Central District in Masal County, Gilan province, Iran.

== Demographics ==
=== Population ===
At the time of the 2006 National Census, the village's population was 207 in 62 households. The following census in 2011 counted 180 people in 55 households. The 2016 census measured the population of the village as 185 people in 65 households.
