= Delijan, Masal =

Delijan دليجان
- Village
- Location within Iran
- Coordinates: 37°25′15″N 49°07′44″E
- Country: Iran
- Province: Gilan
- County: Masal
- Bakhsh: Shanderman
- Rural District: Sheykh Neshin

Population (2006)
  - Total: 401
- Time zone: UTC+3:30 (IRST)

Delijan (Persian: دليجان, also Romanized as Delījān) is a village in Sheykh Neshin Rural District, Shanderman District, Masal County, Gilan Province, Iran.

At the time of the 2006 National Census, the village's population was 401 in 95 households. The following census in 2011 counted 419 people in 119 households. The 2016 census measured the population of the village as 235 people in 77 households.
