= Garm Sar =

Garm Sar گرمسر
- Village
- Location within Iran
- Coordinates: 37°27′37″N 49°07′47″E
- Country: Iran
- Province: Gilan
- County: Masal
- Bakhsh: Shanderman
- Rural District: Sheykh Neshin

Population (2016)
  - Total: 82
- Time zone: UTC+3:30 (IRST)

Garm Sar (Persian: گرمسر) is a village in Sheykh Neshin Rural District, Shanderman District, Masal County, Gilan Province, Iran.

At the time of the 2006 National Census, the village's population was 70 in 23 households. The following census in 2011 counted 86 people in 25 households. The 2016 census measured the population of the village as 82 people in 25 households.
