= Molk-e Jahan =

Molk-e Jahan ملگ جهان
- Village
- Location within Iran
- Coordinates: 37°26′07″N 49°09′19″E
- Country: Iran
- Province: Gilan
- County: Masal
- Bakhsh: Shanderman
- Rural District: Sheykh Neshin

Population (2016)
  - Total: 262
- Time zone: UTC+3:30 (IRST)

Molk-e Jahan (Persian: ملک جهان, also Romanized as Molk-e Jahān) is a village in Sheykh Neshin Rural District, Shanderman District, Masal County, Gilan Province, Iran.

At the time of the 2006 National Census, the village's population was 323 in 80 households. The following census in 2011 counted 306 people in 72 households. The 2016 census measured the population of the village as 262 people in 85 households.
