= Chomachar =

Village in Gilan province, Iran

Chomachar Persian: چماچار
- Village
- Location within Iran
- Coordinates: 37°25′42″N 49°10′06″E
- Country: Iran
- Province: Gilan
- County: Masal
- District: Shanderman
- Rural District: Sheykh Neshin

Population (2016)
  - Total: 454
- Time zone: UTC+3:30 (IRST)

Chomachar (Persian: چماچار) (Note: Also romanized as Chomāchār) is a village in Sheykh Neshin Rural District of Shanderman District in Masal County, Gilan province, Iran.

== Demographics ==
=== Population ===
At the time of the 2006 National Census, the village's population was 455 in 105 households. The following census in 2011 counted 484 people in 123 households. The 2016 census measured the population of the village as 454 people in 143 households.
