= Pir Sara =

Pir Sara (Persian: پيرسرا) may refer to:

- Pir Sara, Masal
- Pir Sara, Shanderman, Masal County
- Pir Sara, Rudbar
- Pir Sara, Sowme'eh Sara
