= Shalma =

Shalma (Persian: شالما) may refer to:

- Shalma, Masal
- Shalma, Shaft

== See also ==
- Shalma Kuh
