= Ahkalan =

Village in Gilan province, Iran

Ahkalan Persian: اهكلان
- Village
- Location within Iran
- Coordinates: 37°18′57″N 49°08′05″E
- Country: Iran
- Province: Gilan
- County: Masal
- District: Central
- Rural District: Howmeh

Population (2016)
  - Total: 517
- Time zone: UTC+3:30 (IRST)

Ahkalan (Persian: اهكلان) (Note: Also romanized as Āhkalān; also known as Āhak Kalān, Āhak Kolān, and Āhak Kūreh) is a village in Howmeh Rural District of the Central District in Masal County, Gilan province, Iran.

== Demographics ==
=== Population ===
At the time of the 2006 National Census, the village's population was 593 in 172 households. The following census in 2011 counted 589 people in 171 households. The 2016 census measured the population of the village as 517 people in 175 households.
