= Chesli =

Village in Gilan province, Iran

Chesli Persian: چسلی
- Village
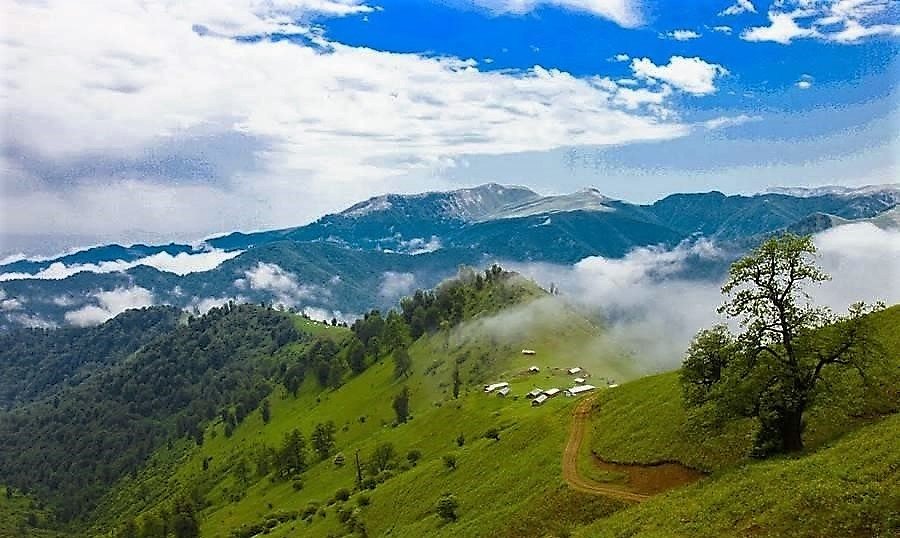
- The village of Chesli

- Location within Iran
- Coordinates: 37°17′19″N 49°02′06″E
- Country: Iran
- Province: Gilan
- County: Masal
- District: Central
- Rural District: Masal

Population (2016)
  - Total: 419
- Time zone: UTC+3:30 (IRST)

Chesli (Persian: چسلی) (Note: Also romanized as Cheslī) is a village in Masal Rural District of the Central District in Masal County, Gilan province, Iran.

== Demographics ==
=== Population ===
At the time of the 2006 National Census, the village's population was 469 in 108 households. The following census in 2011 counted 611 people in 172 households. The 2016 census measured the population of the village as 419 people in 127 households.
