= Zard Dul =

Zard Dul زرددول
- Village
- Country: Iran
- Province: Gilan
- County: Masal
- Bakhsh: Shanderman
- Rural District: Shanderman

Population (2006)
  - Total: 55
- Time zone: UTC+3:30 (IRST)
  - Summer (DST): UTC+4:30 (IRDT)

Zard Dul (Persian: زرددول, also Romanized as Zard Dūl) is an Iranian village in Shanderman Rural District, Shanderman District, Masal County, Gilan Province. Its population was 55 at the 2006 census.
