= Nesa, Gilan =

Nesa نسا
- Village
- Location within Iran
- Coordinates: 37°19′22″N 49°03′26″E
- Country: Iran
- Province: Gilan
- County: Masal
- Bakhsh: Central
- Rural District: Masal

Population (2016)
  - Total: 146
- Time zone: UTC+3:30 (IRST)

Nesa (Persian: نسا, also Romanized as Nesā’ and Nesā) is a village in Masal Rural District, in the Central District of Masal County, Gilan Province, Iran. At the 2016 census, its population was 146, in 43 families. Down from 167 in 2006.
