= Khuy Dul =

Khuy Dul خوی دول
- Village
- Interactive map of Khuy Dul
- Coordinates: 37.294°N 48.954°E
- Country: Iran
- Province: Gilan
- County: Masal
- Bakhsh: Central
- Rural District: Masal

Population (2016)
  - Total: 9
- Time zone: UTC+3:30 (IRST)

Khuy Dul (Persian: خوي دول, also Romanized as Khūy Dūl) is a Yaylak and touristic village in Masal Rural District, in the Central District of Masal County, Gilan Province, Iran.

Its existence was first mentioned in the 2006 Iranian census; however, its population was not reported as it had less than 4 permanent households. The following census in 2011 also counted less than 4 households. The 2016 census measured the population of the village as 9 people in 7 households.
