= Talab Darreh =

Talab Darreh تلاب دره
- Village
- Location within Iran
- Coordinates: 37°24′48″N 49°02′32″E
- Country: Iran
- Province: Gilan
- County: Masal
- Bakhsh: Shanderman
- Rural District: Shanderman

Population (2006)
  - Total: 323
- Time zone: UTC+3:30 (IRST)
  - Summer (DST): UTC+4:30 (IRDT)

Talab Darreh (Persian: تلاب دره, also Romanized as Talāb Darreh) is an Iranian village in Shanderman Rural District, Shanderman District, Masal County, Gilan Province. At the 2006 census, its population was 323, in 70 families.
