= Toéghin Department =

Toéghin
- Department
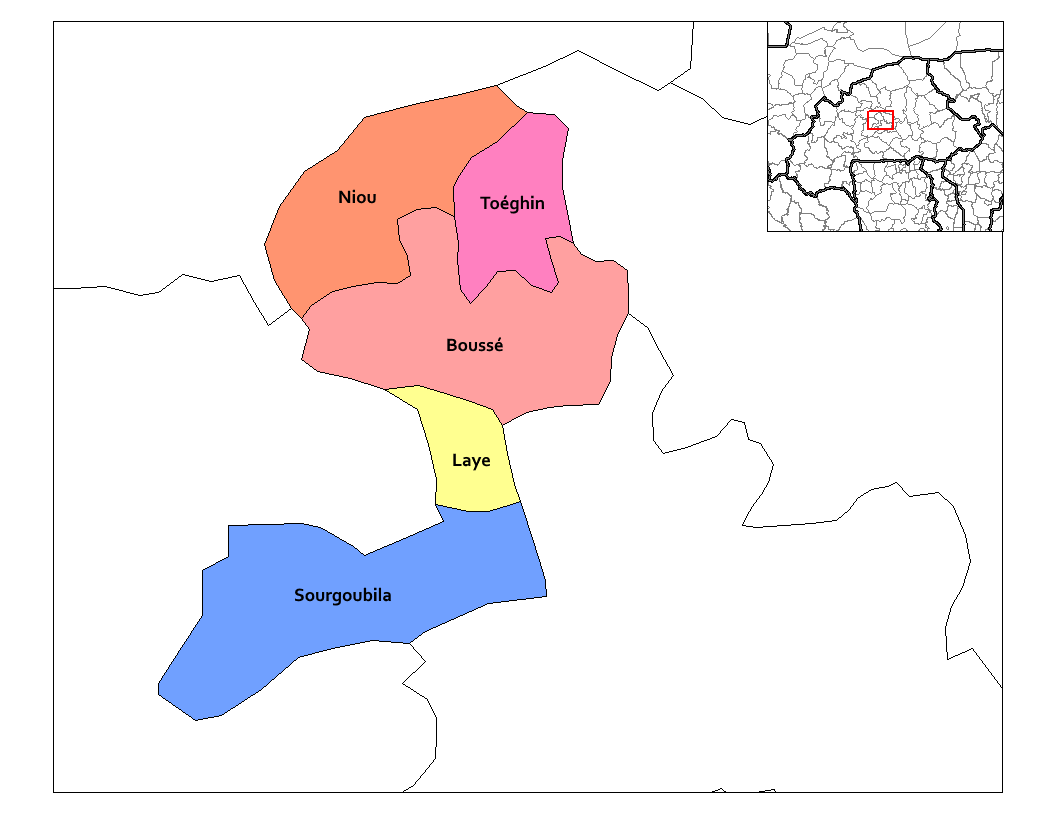
- Toéghin Department location in the province
- Country: Burkina Faso
- Province: Kourwéogo Province

Area
  - Total: 73.1 sq mi (189.3 km^{2})

Population (2019 census)
  - Total: 22,144
  - Density: 303.0/sq mi (117.0/km^{2})
- Time zone: UTC+0 (GMT 0)

Toéghin is a department or commune of Kourwéogo Province in central Burkina Faso. Its capital lies at the town of Toéghin. According to the 2019 census the department has a total population of 22,144.

== Towns and villages ==
- Toéghin (3 958 inhabitants) (capital)
- Bendogo (924 inhabitants)
- Doanghin (689 inhabitants)
- Douré (718 inhabitants)
- Gogsé (538 inhabitants)
- Gourpila (1 469 inhabitants)
- Imkouka (608 inhabitants)
- Kangré (364 inhabitants)
- Listenga (738 inhabitants)
- Moetenga (871 inhabitants)
- Nahartenga (1 591 inhabitants)
- Sandogo (596 inhabitants)
- Sotenga (583 inhabitants)
- Tanghin (672 inhabitants)
- Toussougtenga (497 inhabitants)
- Youbga (359 inhabitants)
- Zeguedeghin (1 462 inhabitants)
- Zipelin (639 inhabitants)
