= Nilash =

Village in Gilan province, Iran

Nilash Persian: نيلاش
- Village
- Location within Iran
- Coordinates: 37°25′16″N 49°04′53″E
- Country: Iran
- Province: Gilan
- County: Masal
- District: Shanderman
- Rural District: Shanderman

Population (2016)
  - Total: 746
- Time zone: UTC+3:30 (IRST)

Nilash (Persian: نيلاش) (Note: Also romanized as Nīlāsh; also known as Nīlāzh) is a village in Shanderman Rural District of Shanderman District in Masal County, Gilan province, Iran.

== Demographics ==
=== Population ===
At the time of the 2006 National Census, the village's population was 684 in 171 households. The following census in 2011 counted 934 people in 232 households. The 2016 census measured the population of the village as 746 people in 251 households.
