= Shalekeh =

Shalekeh شالكه
- Village
- Location within Iran
- Coordinates: 37°25′10″N 49°07′01″E
- Country: Iran
- Province: Gilan
- County: Masal
- Bakhsh: Shanderman
- Rural District: Shanderman

Population (2006)
  - Total: 405
- Time zone: UTC+3:30 (IRST)
  - Summer (DST): UTC+4:30 (IRDT)

Shalekeh (Persian: شالكه, also Romanized as Shālekeh) is an Iranian village in Shanderman Rural District, Shanderman District, Masal County, Gilan Province. Its population was 405 with 94 families, according to the 2006 census.
