= Garamkhani, Gilan =

Garamkhani گرم خانی
- Village
- Location within Iran
- Coordinates: 37°19′00″N 49°02′38″E
- Country: Iran
- Province: Gilan
- County: Masal
- Bakhsh: Central
- Rural District: Masal

Population (2016)
  - Total: 53
- Time zone: UTC+3:30 (IRST)

Garamkhani (Persian: گرم خانی, also Romanized as Garamkhānī; also known as Garamkhākhī and Karamkhānī) is a village in Masal Rural District, in the Central District of Masal County, Gilan Province, Iran.

At the time of the 2006 National Census, the village's population was 63 in 15 households. The following census in 2011 counted 54 people in 16 households. The 2016 census measured the population of the village as 53 people in 18 households.
