= Duleh Malal =

Village in Gilan province, Iran

Duleh Malal Persian: دوله ملال
- Village
- Location within Iran
- Coordinates: 37°21′55″N 49°09′02″E
- Country: Iran
- Province: Gilan
- County: Masal
- District: Central
- Rural District: Howmeh

Population (2016)
  - Total: 725
- Time zone: UTC+3:30 (IRST)

Duleh Malal (Persian: دوله ملال) (Note: Also romanized as Dūleh Malāl; also known as Dūlemalāl and Dyulamilan) is a village in Howmeh Rural District of the Central District in Masal County, Gilan province, Iran.

== Demographics ==
=== Population ===
At the time of the 2006 National Census, the village's population was 826 in 204 households. The following census in 2011 counted 665 people in 201 households. The 2016 census measured the population of the village as 725 people in 243 households.
