= Siah Dul =

Village in Gilan province, Iran

Siah Dul Persian: سياه دول
- Village
- Location within Iran
- Coordinates: 37°19′59″N 49°04′54″E
- Country: Iran
- Province: Gilan
- County: Masal
- District: Central
- Rural District: Masal

Population (2016)
  - Total: 245
- Time zone: UTC+3:30 (IRST)

Siah Dul (Persian: سياه دول) (Note: Also romanized as Sīāh Dūl) is a village in Masal Rural District of the Central District in Masal County, Gilan province, Iran.

== Demographics ==
=== Population ===
At the time of the 2006 National Census, the village's population was 232 in 56 households. The following census in 2011 counted 223 people in 56 households. The 2016 census measured the population of the village as 245 people in 77 households.
