= Lal Kan =

Lal Kan لل كن
- Village
- Location within Iran
- Coordinates: 37°22′40″N 48°58′26″E
- Country: Iran
- Province: Gilan
- County: Masal
- Bakhsh: Shanderman
- Rural District: Shanderman

Population (2006)
  - Total: 25
- Time zone: UTC+3:30 (IRST)
  - Summer (DST): UTC+4:30 (IRDT)

Lal Kan (Persian: لل كن; also known as Leylī Kān) is an Iranian village in Shanderman Rural District, Shanderman District, Masal County, Gilan Province. At the 2006 census, its population consisted of 25 inhabitants in 4 families.
