= Kofud =

Kofud كفود
- Village
- Location within Iran
- Coordinates: 37°25′08″N 49°09′09″E
- Country: Iran
- Province: Gilan
- County: Masal
- Bakhsh: Shanderman
- Rural District: Shanderman

Population (2006)
  - Total: 213
- Time zone: UTC+3:30 (IRST)
  - Summer (DST): UTC+4:30 (IRDT)

Kofud (Persian: كفود, also Romanized as Kofūd) is an Iranian village in Shanderman Rural District, Shanderman District, Masal County, Gilan Province. At the 2006 census, the village population was 213, in 69 families.
