= Moaf, Masal =

Village in Gilan province, Iran

Moaf Persian: معاف
- Village
- Location within Iran
- Coordinates: 37°28′08″N 49°05′29″E
- Country: Iran
- Province: Gilan
- County: Masal
- District: Shanderman
- Rural District: Shanderman

Population (2016)
  - Total: 545
- Time zone: UTC+3:30 (IRST)

Moaf (Persian: معاف) (Note: Also romanized as Moʿāf) is a village in Shanderman Rural District of Shanderman District in Masal County, Gilan province, Iran.

== Demographics ==
=== Population ===
At the time of the 2006 National Census, the village's population was 495 in 133 households. The following census in 2011 counted 600 people in 174 households. The 2016 census measured the population of the village as 545 people in 171 households.
