= Asb Rish =

Asb Rish اسب ريسه
- Village
- Location within Iran
- Coordinates: 37°17′36″N 48°59′44″E
- Country: Iran
- Province: Gilan
- County: Masal
- Bakhsh: Central
- Rural District: Masal

Population (2016)
  - Total: 85
- Time zone: UTC+3:30 (IRST)

Asb Rish (Persian: اسب ريسه, also Romanized as Āsb Rīsh; also known as Asbeh Rīs) is a village in Masal Rural District, in the Central District of Masal County, Gilan Province, Iran.

At the time of the 2006 National Census, the village's population was 113 in 23 households. The following census in 2011 counted 95 people in 26 households. The 2016 census measured the population of the village as 85 people in 28 households.
