= Vardum =

Village in Gilan province, Iran

Vardum Persian: وردوم
- Village
- Location within Iran
- Coordinates: 37°20′54″N 49°10′01″E
- Country: Iran
- Province: Gilan
- County: Masal
- District: Central
- Rural District: Howmeh

Population (2016)
  - Total: 853
- Time zone: UTC+3:30 (IRST)

Vardum (Persian: وردوم) (Note: Also romanized as Vardūm; also known as Verdom) is a village in Howmeh Rural District of the Central District in Masal County, Gilan province, Iran.

== Demographics ==
=== Population ===
At the time of the 2006 National Census, the village's population was 1,024 in 252 households. The following census in 2011 counted 913 people in 292 households. The 2016 census measured the population of the village as 853 people in 282 households.
