= Goabga =

Town in Plateau-Centre, Burkina Faso

- Rural commune
- Location in Burkina Faso
- Coordinates: 12°41′52.9″N 1°55′50.9″W
- Country: Burkina Faso
- Region: Plateau-Central Region
- Province: Kourweogo Province
- Department: Niou Department

Population (2019)
  - Total: 2,217

Goabga is a town located in the Niou Department, Kourweogo Province, Plateau-Central Region in Burkina Faso.
