= Niou =

Niou may refer to:

- Niou Department in Burkina Faso
- Joseph Niou, French marine engineer and politician
- Yuh-Line Niou, American politician
