= Pir Sara, Howmeh =

Village in Gilan province, Iran

Pir Sara Persian: پيرسرا
- Village
- Location within Iran
- Coordinates: 37°21′06″N 49°09′39″E
- Country: Iran
- Province: Gilan
- County: Masal
- District: Central
- Rural District: Howmeh

Population (2016)
  - Total: 223
- Time zone: UTC+3:30 (IRST)

Pir Sara (Persian: پيرسرا) (Note: Also romanized as Pīr Sarā; also known as Pīrehsarā) is a village in Howmeh Rural District of the Central District in Masal County, Gilan province, Iran.

== Demographics ==
=== Population ===
At the time of the 2006 National Census, the village's population was 193 in 53 households. The following census in 2011 counted 218 people in 68 households. The 2016 census measured the population of the village as 223 people in 75 households.
