= Gont =

Gont may refer to:

- Rastislav Gont (born 1978), Slovak archbishop
- Gont, fictional island in Earthsea

== See also ==
- Gant (disambiguation)
