= Kanzer =

Village in Gilan province, Iran

Kanzer Persian: كنذر
- Village
- Location within Iran
- Coordinates: 37°19′23″N 49°03′06″E
- Country: Iran
- Province: Gilan
- County: Masal
- District: Central
- Rural District: Masal

Population (2016)
  - Total: 308
- Time zone: UTC+3:30 (IRST)

Kanzer (Persian: كنذر) (Note: Also romanized as Kanz̄er; also known as Ganz̄ar, Ganzer, Geyānzīr, and Gianzir) is a village in Masal Rural District of the Central District in Masal County, Gilan province, Iran.

== Demographics ==
=== Population ===
At the time of the 2006 National Census, the village's population was 381 in 89 households. The following census in 2011 counted 393 people in 107 households. The 2016 census measured the population of the village as 308 people in 94 households.
