= Boussé Department =

Coordinates: 12°39′38″N 1°53′32″W

Boussé
- Department
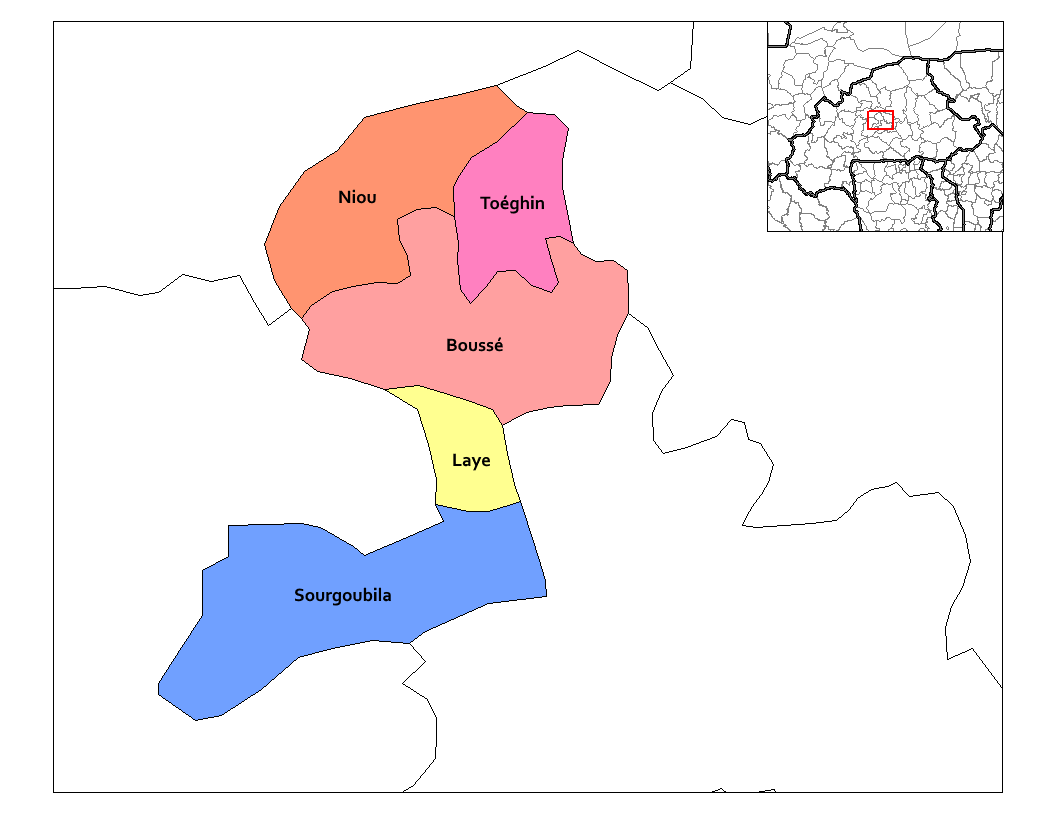
- Boussé Department location in the province
- Country: Burkina Faso
- Province: Kourwéogo Province

Area
  - Department: 175 sq mi (454 km^{2})

Population (2019 census)
  - Department: 58,641
  - Density: 335/sq mi (129/km^{2})
  - Urban: 25,022
- Time zone: UTC+0 (GMT 0)

Boussé is a department or commune of Kourwéogo Province in central Burkina Faso. Its capital is the town of Boussé. According to the 2019 census the department has a total population of 58,641.

== Towns and villages ==
- Boussé (25,027 inhabitants) (capital)
- Gasma (1,712 inhabitants)
- Goala (1,006 inhabitants)
- Golmidou (1,740 inhabitants)
- Goundrin (1,852 inhabitants)
- Guesna (1,061 inhabitants)
- Kaonghin (3,838 inhabitants)
- Kiedpalogo (1,005 inhabitants)
- Kinana (1,242 inhabitants)
- Koui (2,021 inhabitants)
- Kourian (966 inhabitants)
- Laogo (717 inhabitants)
- Likinkelsé (1,196 inhabitants)
- Sandogo (2,734 inhabitants)
- Sao (5,369 inhabitants)
- Silmiougou (708 inhabitants)
- Yargo (673 inhabitants)
