= Taonsogo =

Town in Centre, Burkina Faso

- Rural commune
- Country: Burkina Faso
- Region: Plateau-Central Region
- Province: Kourweogo
- Department: Sourgoubila Department

Population (2019)
  - Total: 2,017

Taonsogo is a populated place located in the Sourgoubila Department of Kourweogo Province, Plateau-Central in Burkina Faso.
