= Gnant =

Gnant is a surname. Notable people with the surname include:

- Jody Marie Gnant (born 1981), American singer-songwriter and pianist
- Randall Gnant (born 1945), American politician

== See also ==
- Gant (surname)
