= Gand =

Gand may refer to:

- Ghent (French: Gand), a city in Belgium
- Gand (Star Wars), a fictional planet and its resident species in the Star Wars franchise
- Gand., the standard author abbreviation for Michel Gandoger
- Gand, Germanic term for dark sorcery, often used in relation to the indigenous people of Sápmi (north Norway, Sweden, Finland and northwest Russia)
- Gandr, Old Norse word for "witch's familiar", "wand", or "magic staff", which is incorporated into the names of many Norse mythological and legendary figures; see Gandalf (mythology)
- Gands, the human colonists of a planet in the novel The Great Explosion by Eric Frank Russell
- GATAD2B-associated neurodevelopmental disorder
