= Darkhaneh, Gilan =

Village in Gilan province, Iran

Darkhaneh Persian: درخانه
- Village
- Location within Iran
- Coordinates: 37.35°N 49.143°E
- Country: Iran
- Province: Gilan
- County: Masal
- District: Central
- Rural District: Howmeh

Population (2016)
  - Total: 299
- Time zone: UTC+3:30 (IRST)

Darkhaneh (Persian: درخانه) (Note: Also romanized as Darkhāneh) is a village in Howmeh Rural District of the Central District in Masal County, Gilan province, Iran.

== Demographics ==
=== Population ===
At the time of the 2006 National Census, the village's population was 247 in 77 households. The following census in 2011 counted 309 people in 96 households. The 2016 census measured the population of the village as 299 people in 103 households.
