= Pir Sara, Shanderman =

Village in Gilan province, Iran

Pir Sara Persian: پيرسرا
- Village
- Location within Iran
- Coordinates: 37°26′27″N 49°07′27″E
- Country: Iran
- Province: Gilan
- County: Masal
- District: Shanderman
- Rural District: Sheykh Neshin

Population (2016)
  - Total: 524
- Time zone: UTC+3:30 (IRST)

Pir Sara (Persian: پيرسرا) (Note: Also romanized as Pīr Sarā; also known as Pīreh Sarā) is a village in Sheykh Neshin Rural District of Shanderman District in Masal County, Gilan province, Iran.

== Demographics ==
=== Population ===
At the time of the 2006 National Census, the village's population was 580 in 180 households. The following census in 2011 counted 595 people in 185 households. The 2016 census measured the population of the village as 524 people in 180 households.
