= Gantt =

Gantt may refer to:

- Henry Gantt, American mechanical engineer and management consultant, known for his work in the development of scientific management and creator of the Gantt chart
- Gantt chart, a type of bar chart that illustrates a project schedule and estimation
- Gantt (surname)
- Gantt, Alabama, United States
- Gantt, South Carolina, United States

== See also ==
- Gant (disambiguation)
- Gantz (disambiguation)
