= Laye =

Laye may refer to:

== People ==
- Camara Laye (1928–1980), Guinean writer
- Dilys Laye (1934–2009), English actress and screenwriter
- Evelyn Laye (1900–1996), English actress
- Issa Laye Thiaw (1943–2017), Senegalese historian, theologian, and author
- Joseph Henry Laye (1849–1938), British army officer
- Seydina Mouhammadou Limamou Laye (1843–1909), Senegalese religious leader

== Places ==
- Laye, Burkina Faso (fr)
- Laye, Hautes-Alpes, France
- Laye Department, Burkina Faso
