= Shalma, Masal =

Village in Gilan province, Iran

Shalma Persian: شالما
- Village
- Location within Iran
- Coordinates: 37°18′19″N 49°02′01″E
- Country: Iran
- Province: Gilan
- County: Masal
- District: Central
- Rural District: Masal

Population (2016)
  - Total: 243
- Time zone: UTC+3:30 (IRST)

Shalma (Persian: شالما) (Note: Also romanized as Shālmā and Shalmā; also known as Shālmā Khorūm and Shalmah) is a village in Masal Rural District of the Central District in Masal County, Gilan province, Iran.

== Demographics ==
=== Population ===
At the time of the 2006 National Census, the village's population was 372 in 96 households. The following census in 2011 counted 327 people in 102 households. The 2016 census measured the population of the village as 243 people in 83 households.
