= Shalma Kuh =

Shalma Kuh شالماكوه
- Village
- Location within Iran
- Coordinates: 37°21′00″N 49°01′40″E
- Country: Iran
- Province: Gilan
- County: Masal
- Bakhsh: Central
- Rural District: Masal

Population (2016)
  - Total: 153
- Time zone: UTC+3:30 (IRST)

Shalma Kuh (Persian: شالماكوه, also Romanized as Shālmā Kūh) is a village in Masal Rural District, in the Central District of Masal County, Gilan Province, Iran.

At the time of the 2006 National Census, the village's population was 142 in 33 households. The following census in 2011 counted 163 people in 52 households. The 2016 census measured the population of the village as 153 people in 51 households.
