= Ganser =

Ganser is a surname. Notable people with the surname include:

- Daniele Ganser (b. 1972), Swiss historian
- Helen Ganser (1891–1990), American librarian
- Sigbert Josef Maria Ganser (1853-1931), German psychiatrist
- Marguerite "Marge" Ganser (1948–1996) and Mary Ann Ganser (1948–1970), members of the girl group The Shangri-Las

== See also ==
- Ganser syndrome, a rare psychiatric disorder characterised by the individual mimicking behaviour they think is typical of a psychosis
