= Boussé =

Coordinates: 12°40′00″N 1°53′51″W

- Town
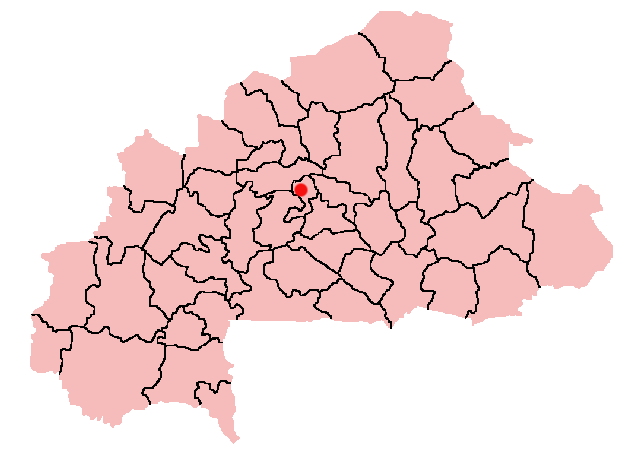
- Location within Burkina Faso, West Africa
- Country: Burkina Faso
- Region: Plateau-Central Region
- Province: Kourweogo Province
- Department: Boussé Department

Population (2019 census)
  - Total: 25,022
- Time zone: UTC+0 (GMT)

Boussé is a town located in the province of Kourwéogo in Burkina Faso. It is the capital of Kourwéogo Province.

The population in 2019 was 25,022 people. Boussé is a sister city of Decatur, Georgia, USA.
