= Howmeh Rural District (Masal County) =

Rural district in Gilan province, Iran

Howmeh Rural District Persian: دهستان حومه
- Rural District
- Location within Iran
- Coordinates: 37°21′N 49°08′E
- Country: Iran
- Province: Gilan
- County: Masal
- District: Central
- Established: 1997
- Capital: Kuchkam

Population (2016)
  - Total: 8,209
- Time zone: UTC+3:30 (IRST)

Howmeh Rural District (Persian: دهستان حومه) is in the Central District of Masal County, Gilan province, Iran. Its capital is the village of Kuchkam.

== Demographics ==
=== Population ===
At the time of the 2006 National Census, the rural district's population was 9,652 in 2,532 households. There were 8,962 inhabitants in 2,674 households at the following census of 2011. The 2016 census measured the population of the rural district as 8,209 in 2,721 households. The most populous of its 16 villages was Veshmeh Sara, with 1,186 inhabitants.

=== Other villages in the rural district ===
- Ahkalan
- Darkhaneh
- Duleh Malal
- Gavmishban
- Gileh Sara
- Khaneqah Bar
- Khvod Bechar
- Kishkhani
- Lang
- Markiyeh
- Mileh Sara
- Pir Sara
- Seyyed Mahalleh
- Vardum
