= Masal Rural District =

Rural district in Gilan province, Iran

Masal Rural District Persian: دهستان ماسال
- Rural District
- Location within Iran
- Coordinates: 37°19′N 49°00′E
- Country: Iran
- Province: Gilan
- County: Masal
- District: Central
- Established: 1987
- Capital: Taskuh

Population (2016)
  - Total: 4,532
- Time zone: UTC+3:30 (IRST)

Masal Rural District (Persian: دهستان ماسال) is in the Central District of Masal County in Iran's Gilan province. Its capital is the village of Taskuh.

== Demographics ==
=== Population ===
At the time of the 2006 National Census, the rural district's population was 5,419 in 1,368 households. There were 5,146 inhabitants in 1,462 households at the following census of 2011. The 2016 census measured the population of the rural district as 4,532 in 1,466 households. The most populous of its 33 villages was Taskuh, with 423 inhabitants.

=== Other villages in the rural district ===
- Asb Rish
- Chesli
- Dulkuh
- Garamkhani
- Kaleh Sar
- Kanzer
- Khorum
- Khun
- Khuy Dul
- Kurbar
- Lipa
- Lir
- Malek Poshteh
- Masuleh Khani
- Mehdikhan Mahalleh
- Mir Mahalleh
- Nesa
- Rizeh Mandan
- Salimabad
- Sarakeh
- Shalma Kuh
- Shalma
- Siah Dul
- Suteh Chaleh
- Suteh Kesh
- Tabaq Sar
- Tabar Sara
- Talargah
- Tul Nesa
- Tutnesa
- Varmiyeh
- Vizeh Dul
