= Sourgoubila Department =

Coordinates: 12°25′03″N 1°48′25″W

Sourgoubila
- Department
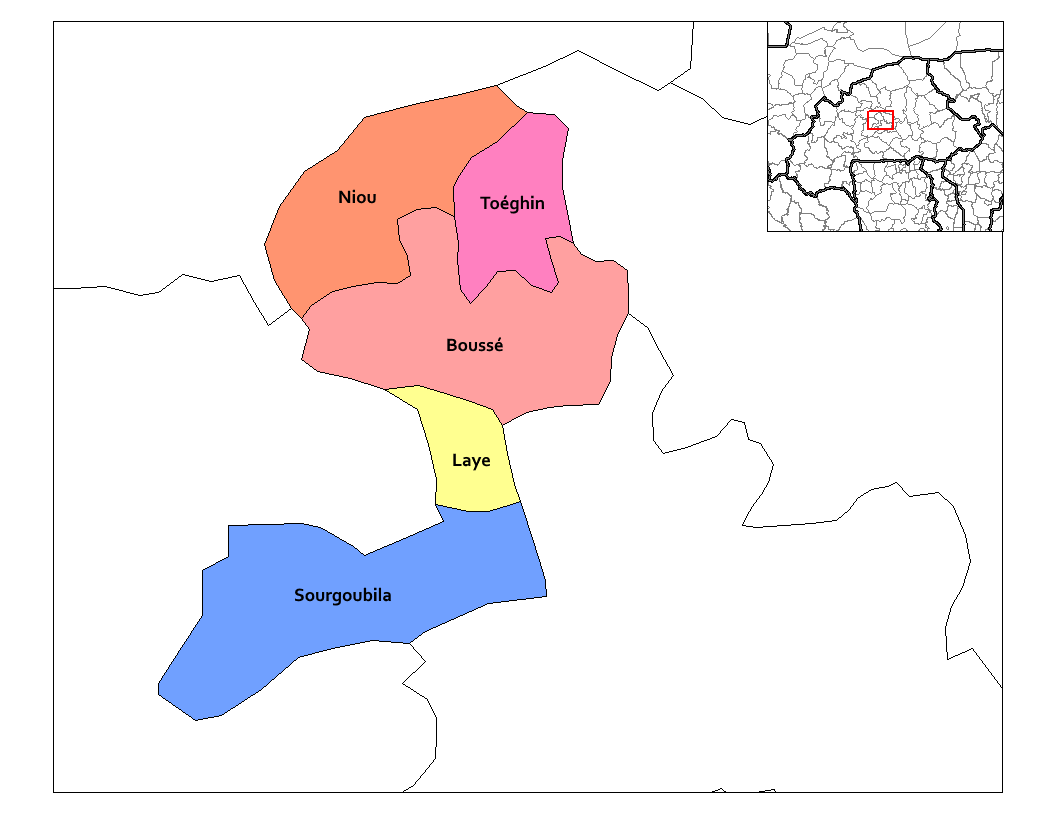
- Sourgoubila Department location in the province
- Country: Burkina Faso
- Province: Kourwéogo Province

Area
  - Total: 182.5 sq mi (472.6 km^{2})

Population (2019 census)
  - Total: 48,654
  - Density: 266.6/sq mi (102.9/km^{2})
- Time zone: UTC+0 (GMT 0)

Sourgoubila is a department or commune of Kourwéogo Province in central Burkina Faso. Its capital lies at the town of Sourgoubila. According to the 2019 census the department has a total population of 48,654.

== Towns and villages ==
- Sourgoubila (4,963 inhabitants) (capital)
- Bagayiri (821 inhabitants)
- Bantogdo (6,350 inhabitants)
- Barouli (1,267 inhabitants)
- Bouanga (1,776 inhabitants)
- Damsi (1,170 inhabitants)
- Diguila (967 inhabitants)
- Gonsin (2,683 inhabitants)
- Guela (2,815 inhabitants)
- Koala (298 inhabitants)
- Koukin (686 inhabitants)
- Lao (1,319 inhabitants)
- Manefyam (823 inhabitants)
- Nakamtenga (661 inhabitants)
- Sandogo (6,042 inhabitants)
- Sanon (2,302 inhabitants)
- Taonsogo (1,714 inhabitants)
- Zoundri (2,569 inhabitants)
