= Laye Department =

Coordinates: 12°31′35″N 1°46′21″W

Laye
- Department
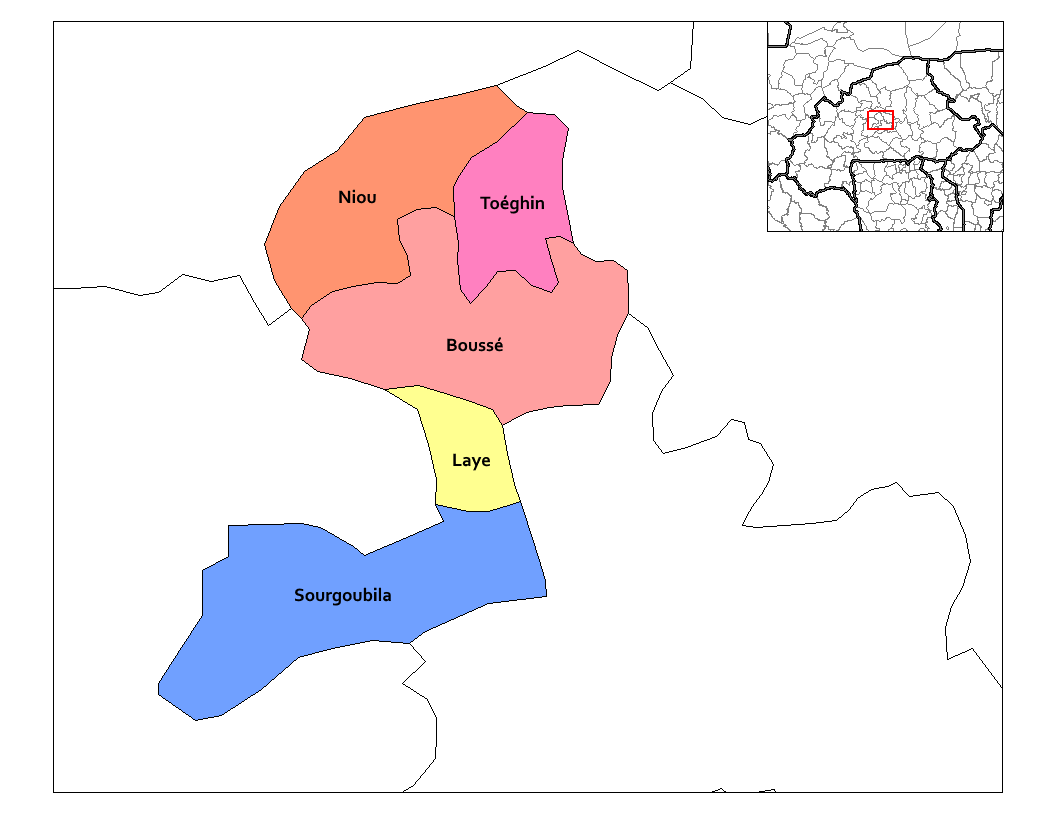
- Laye Department location in the province
- Country: Burkina Faso
- Province: Kourwéogo Province

Area
  - Total: 47.9 sq mi (124.1 km^{2})

Population (2019)
  - Total: 16,630
  - Density: 347.1/sq mi (134.0/km^{2})
- Time zone: UTC+0 (GMT 0)

Laye is a department or commune of Kourwéogo Province in central Burkina Faso. Its capital lies at the town of Laye. According to the 1996 census the department has a total population of 16,630.

== Towns and villages ==
- Laye (5 136 inhabitants) (capital)
- Barama (978 inhabitants)
- Boulala (981 inhabitants)
- Gantin (825 inhabitants)
- Gantogodo (998 inhabitants)
- Sapeo (785 inhabitants)
- Laye yarcé (226 inhabitants)
- Sondré (570 inhabitants)
- Wanonghin (202 inhabitants)
- Yactenga (1 214 inhabitants)
