= Bazar Jomeh =

City in Gilan province, Iran

Bazar Jomeh Persian: بازار جمعه
- City
- Location within Iran
- Coordinates: 37°24′23″N 49°07′07″E
- Country: Iran
- Province: Gilan
- County: Masal
- District: Shanderman
- Established as a city: 1999

Population (2016)
  - Total: 5,729
- Time zone: UTC+3:30 (IRST)

Bazar Jomeh (Persian: بازارجمعه) (Note: Also romanized as Bāzār Jom‘eh; also known as Bāzār Jom‘eh-ye Shānderman and Dzhuma-Bazar) is a city in, and the capital of, Shanderman District of Masal County, Gilan province, Iran. It also serves as the administrative center for Shanderman Rural District. The village of Bazar Jomeh was converted to a city in 1999.

== Demographics ==
=== Population ===
At the time of the 2006 National Census, the city population was 3,866 in 997 households. The following census in 2011 counted 4,493 people in 1,243 households. The 2016 census measured the population of the city as 5,729 people in 1,762 households.
