= Sheykh Neshin Rural District =

Rural district in Gilan province, Iran

Sheykh Neshin Rural District Persian: دهستان شيخ نشين
- Rural District
- Location within Iran
- Coordinates: 37°26′N 49°08′E
- Country: Iran
- Province: Gilan
- County: Masal
- District: Shanderman
- Established: 1997
- Capital: Sheykh Neshin

Population (2016)
  - Total: 5,968
- Time zone: UTC+3:30 (IRST)

Sheykh Neshin Rural District (Persian: دهستان شيخ نشين) is in Shanderman District of Masal County, Gilan province, Iran. Its capital is the village of Sheykh Neshin.

== Demographics ==
=== Population ===
At the time of the 2006 National Census, the rural district's population was 6,495 in 1,700 households. There were 6,694 inhabitants in 1,869 households at the following census of 2011. The 2016 census measured the population of the rural district as 5,968 in 1,978 households. The most populous of its 16 villages was Estalkh Zir, with 803 people.

=== Other villages in the rural district ===
- Barg Sara
- Chamush Duzan
- Chomachar
- Delijan
- Garm Sar
- Khalavarjan
- Kureh Jan
- Mir Mahalleh
- Molk Bogur
- Molk-e Jahan
- Pir Sara
- Qeran
- Siah Duleh
- Tuseh Sara
