= Niou Department =

Coordinates: 12°46′08″N 1°56′11″W

Niou
- Department
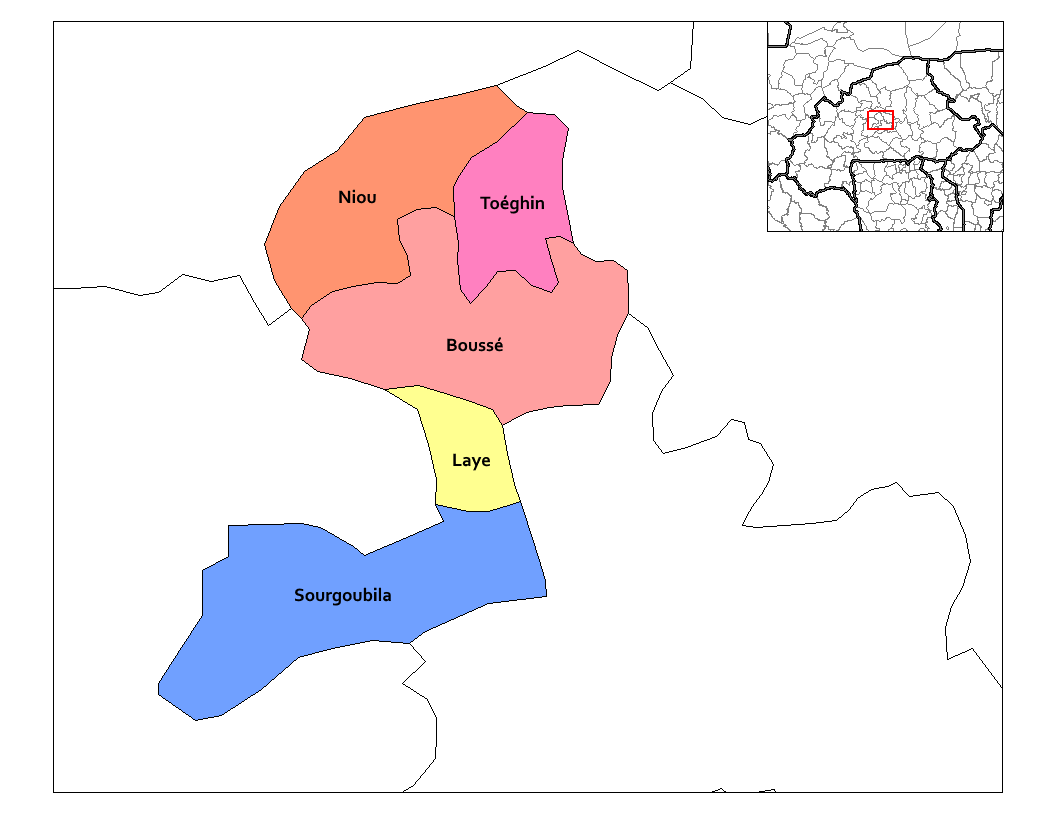
- Niou Department location in the province
- Country: Burkina Faso
- Province: Kourwéogo Province

Area
  - Total: 137.3 sq mi (355.7 km^{2})

Population (2019 census)
  - Total: 35,171
  - Density: 256.1/sq mi (98.88/km^{2})
- Time zone: UTC+0 (GMT 0)

Niou is a department or commune of Kourwéogo Province in central Burkina Faso. Its capital lies at the town of Niou. According to the 1996 census the department has a total population of 26,977.

== Towns and villages ==
- Niou (1 793 inhabitants) (capital)
- Belé (371 inhabitants)
- Garga (933 inhabitants)
- Gasgo (380 inhabitants)
- Goabga (2 041 inhabitants)
- Kouka (1 479 inhabitants)
- Koukin (2 472 inhabitants)
- Mouni (1 750 inhabitants)
- Nabzinigma (320 inhabitants)
- Napalgué (2 789 inhabitants)
- Niapa (543 inhabitants)
- Niou-yarcé (635 inhabitants)
- Raongo (1 186 inhabitants)
- Sakouli (1 530 inhabitants)
- Sondogtenga (620 inhabitants)
- Sourou (1 161 inhabitants)
- Tamsé (900 inhabitants)
- Tanghin (1 886 inhabitants)
- Tangseghin (1 151 inhabitants)
- Wa (1 457 inhabitants)
- Zeguedeghin (1 580 inhabitants)
