= GATAD2B-associated neurodevelopmental disorder =

- Other names: GAND
- Specialty: Medical genetics
- Usual onset: Birth
- Duration: Life-long
- Causes: Mutation in the GATAD2B gene.
- Prevention: none
- Prognosis: Medium, nearing good
- Frequency: very rare, only 78 cases have been described in medical literature
- Deaths: -

GATAD2B-associated neurodevelopmental disorder is a rare genetic neurodevelopmental disorder which is characterized by severe intellectual disabilities, speech delays, hypotonia and facial dysmorphia.

== Signs and symptoms ==
The following is a list of all the symptoms:

- Moderate to severe intellectual disabilities
- Speech delay
- Macrocephaly
- Childhood low muscle tone
- Feeding problems
- Variable cardiac anomalies
- Facial dysmorphisms

Additional symptoms include polyhydramnios and epilepsy.

== Causes ==
This condition is caused by either (usually sporadic or de novo) alterations or a deletion of the GATAD2B gene, located in chromosome 1. In familial cases, inheritance is usually autosomal dominant.

== Epidemiology ==
78 cases have been described in medical literature.
