= Tamsé =

- Location in Burkina Faso
- Coordinates: 11°44′N 1°20′W
- Country: Burkina Faso
- Region: Centre-Sud Region
- Province: Bazèga Province
- Department: Toece Department

Population (2019)
  - Total: 488

Tamsé is a village in the Toece Department of Bazèga Province in central Burkina Faso.

Population
Year	Pop.	±%
1985	465	—
2006	370	−20.4%
2019	488	+31.9%
