= Darkhaneh, Hormozgan =

Darkhaneh درخانه
- Village
- Location within Iran
- Coordinates: 27°11′27″N 56°59′31″E
- Country: Iran
- Province: Hormozgan
- County: Minab
- Bakhsh: Central
- Rural District: Howmeh

Population (2006)
  - Total: 281
- Time zone: UTC+3:30 (IRST)
  - Summer (DST): UTC+4:30 (IRDT)

Darkhaneh (Persian: درخانه, also Romanized as Darkhāneh) is a village in Howmeh Rural District, in the Central District of Minab County, Hormozgan Province, Iran. At the 2006 census, its population was 281, in 52 families.
