= Bruce Gans =

American physiatrist

Bruce M. Gans is an American physiatrist. Gans serves as the chief medical officer and executive vice president at Kessler Institute for Rehabilitation

== Education ==
Gans received his MD degree from the University of Pennsylvania School of Medicine in Philadelphia and an MS in biomedical electronic engineering from the Moore School of Electrical Engineering at the University of Pennsylvania. Gans holds an MS degree from the University of Washington. He served his medical internship at the Philadelphia General Hospital and residency in physical medicine and rehabilitation at the University of Washington, Seattle. Gans received his BS degree in electrical engineering from Union College, Schenectady, New York.

== American Academy of Physical Medicine and Rehabilitation ==
Gans has served as the president of the American Academy of Physical Medicine and Rehabilitation (AAPM&R) in 2005

== Publications ==
- Gans BM (2008). "Impact of the "60% rule" on inpatient medical rehabilitation". Am J Phys Med Rehabil. 87 (4): 255–7. doi:10.1097/PHM.0b013e31816c0439. PMID 18356617.
- Gans BM, Kraft GH (1981). "M-response quantification: a technique". Arch Phys Med Rehabil. 62 (8): 376–80. PMID 6266370.
