= Gantz (disambiguation) =

Gantz is a manga series created by Hiroya Oku, later adapted into an anime and two live action films.

Gantz may also refer to:

== People ==
- Benny Gantz (born 1959), Israeli military leader and politician of the Israel Resilience Party
- Harry Gantz (1886–1972), American politician from Nebraska
- Timothy Gantz (1946–2004), classical scholar
- Yisrael Gantz (born 1978), head of the Mateh Binyamin Regional Council, Israel, from 2018

== Other uses ==
- Gantz, a character from the Klonoa series
- Gantz (film), a 2011 series of live-action Japanese science fiction films
- Gantz Homestead, a historical farm house in Grove City, Ohio

== See also ==
- Ganz (disambiguation)
- Gant (disambiguation)
- Gantt (disambiguation)
- Gans (disambiguation)
