= Gandalf (mythology) =

Dwarf in Norse mythology

Gandalf (Old Norse: Gandálfr [ˈɡɑndˌɑːlvz̠]) is a Dvergr (Norse dwarf) in Norse mythology, appearing in the so-called 'Tally of the Dwarves' within the poem Völuspá from the Poetic Edda, as well as in the Prose Edda. The name derives from the Old Norse words gandr (magical entity e.g. wands, monsters etc.) and álfr (elf), thus a protective spirit who wields a magical wand.

The name was also used for a Norse king in the Heimskringla.

In his fictional writings, J. R. R. Tolkien eventually named his wizard Gandalf after the Dvergr, but initially used the name for the head of the dwarf party (ultimately to be called Thorin Oakenshield).

== See also ==
- Kenning
- Skáldskaparmál
- Snorri Sturluson
