= Helen Ganser =

American librarian

- Born: 1891
- Died: 1990 (aged 98–99)
- Occupation: Librarian

Helen Alice Ganser (1891–1990) was an American librarian. She became the first librarian at Millersville State Normal School in Millersville, Pennsylvania (now Millersville University of Pennsylvania) in 1911. She was the institution's only professional librarian until 1921.

== Career ==
After completing her training as a librarian at the Drexel Institute of Art, Science and Industry, Ganser devoted her entire career to Millersville State Teachers College library and to the cause of school librarianship. She is credited with starting the library science program at Millersville in 1921.

Ganser was a member of the American Library Association. On November 27, 1933, Helen Ganser was nominated for membership in the joint committee of the American Library Association and the American Association of Colleges for Teacher Education based on her "Experience giving courses for school and teacher-librarians."

She retired in 1952. In 1966, Millersville State College demolished the historic "Old Main" and replaced it with the then-modern 11-story Helen A. Ganser Library in 1968.

The contents of the Archives and Special Collections Library of Vassar College note the significance of the opening of the Helen A. Ganser Library including material pertaining to the dedication of the Helen Ganser Library at which Louise Seaman Bechtel, the noted author of children's books and former publisher and head of the Children's Book Department of The Macmillan Company, was present. The personal papers of Louise Seaman Bechtel contained in the archives include several items of correspondence and photographs of Ms. Ganser.

It is rumored that Ganser's ghost haunts the 4th floor balcony of the library named in her honor.

In the summer of 2011, the Helen A. Ganser Library at Millersville University temporarily closed to undergo renovations. The library reopened in August 2013, after having a $25 million makeover. The library was renamed the Francine G. McNairy Library and Learning Forum at Ganser Hall.
