= Gans =

Gans may refer to:

- Gans, Oklahoma, town
- Gans, Pennsylvania, community
- Gans, Gironde, commune of the Gironde department, France

== See also ==
- Gans (surname), people with the surname Gans
- Generative adversarial networks (GANs), a class of artificial intelligence algorithms
