= Aura Ganz =

Israeli-American computer engineer

Aura Ganz is an Israeli and American computer engineer, formerly a professor of electrical and computer engineering at the University of Massachusetts Amherst, and director of the university's Multimedia Networking Laboratory. Topics in her research have included network routing in optical networks and wireless ad hoc networks, the application of mobile networks in healthcare, and assisted physical navigation systems for people with disabilities or in emergency situations.

Ganz was an undergraduate at the Technion – Israel Institute of Technology, and continued there for a master's degree and Ph.D. In 2007, she was a Distinguished Visiting Fellow of the Royal Academy of Engineering, visiting Robert Istepanian at Kingston University. She was elected as an IEEE Fellow in 2008, as a member of the IEEE Engineering in Medicine and Biology Society, "for contributions to architectures, algorithms, and protocols for high speed communications networks".

Ganz is a coauthor of the book Multimedia Wireless Networks: Technologies, Standards, and QoS (Prentice-Hall, 2003, with Zvi Ganz and Kitti Wongthavarawat).
