= Camih Gantin =

Togolese beauty pageant winner (2012)

Camih Epiphanie Gantin
- Born: Camih Epiphanie Gantin; Bassar, Togo
- Height: 1.72 m (5 ft 7 1/2 in)
- Beauty pageant titleholder
- Title: Miss Togo 2012
- Major competitions: Miss Togo 2012 (Winner)

Camih Epiphanie Gantin; is a beauty pageant titleholder who was crowned Miss Togo 2012.

== Early life ==
Gantin is a third year student of Economics & International Finance

== Miss Togo 2012 ==
Miss Epiphany, Camih Gantin has been crowned Miss Togo 2012 by Handlos Quizi (Miss Togo 2011) at the 18th edition of Miss Togo beauty pageant which was held in Lome on Saturday night of 1 September 2012.

Awards and achievements
Preceded by Monique Quizi Handlos	Miss Togo; 2012	Succeeded by Incumbent
