= Ganz (disambiguation) =

Ganz may refer to:

- Ganz Works, a Hungarian manufacturer of electric railway equipment
- Ganz Midwest-CBK, a Canadian toy and home décor company known for Webkinz
- Ganz, Styria, a town in the district of Mürzzuschlag in Styria, Austria
- Ganz (surname), people with the surname Ganz
- Ganz province, former state and province of the Ethiopian Empire

== See also ==
- Swan-Ganz catheter, a pulmonary artery catheter
- Gantz (disambiguation)
- Gans (disambiguation)
