= Mitchell Gans =

American legal scholar

Academic work
- Institutions: Hofstra University

Mitchell Gans is an American legal scholar and Rivkin Radler Distinguished Professor of Law at Hofstra University.
