= Solomon Philip Gans =

German jurist and writer

- Born: 26 February 1788; Celle, Electorate of Hanover
- Died: 1 November 1843 (aged 55); Hanover, Kingdom of Hanover

Solomon Philip Gans (German: Salomon Philipp Gans; 26 February 1788 – 1 November 1843) was a German jurist who lived at Celle, Hanover. He was the author of Das Erbrecht des Napoleonischen, Gesetzbuches für Westphalen (Hanover, 1810), Über die Verarmung der Städte und-des Landmannes (Brunswick, 1831), and Entwurf einer Criminal-Processordnung (Göttingen, 1836). He also edited the Zeitschrift für die Civil-und Criminalrechtspflege im Königreich Hanover, of which only four issues appeared.

== Publications ==
- Das Erbrecht des Napoleonischen, Gesetzbuches für Westphalen. Hanover. 1810.
- Von dem Verbrechen des Kindermordes. Hannover: Helwing. 1824.
- Kritische Beleuchtung des Entwurfs eines Strafgesetzbuches für das Königreich Hannover. Celle: Schweiger und Pick. 1827.
- Von dem Amte der Fürsprecher von Gericht, nebst einem Entwurfe einer Advocaten-und Tax-Ordnung (2nd ed.). Celle: Schulz. 1827.
- Über die Verarmung der Städte und-des Landmannes. Brunswick: Friedrich Vieweg. 1831.
- Entwurf einer Criminal-Processordnung. Göttingen: Dieter. 1836.
