= Shanderman Rural District =

Rural district in Gilan province, Iran

Shanderman Rural District Persian: دهستان شاندرمن
- Rural District
- Location within Iran
- Coordinates: 37°23′N 48°59′E
- Country: Iran
- Province: Gilan
- County: Masal
- District: Shanderman
- Established: 1987
- Capital: Bazar Jomeh

Population (2016)
  - Total: 10,310
- Time zone: UTC+3:30 (IRST)

Shanderman Rural District (Persian: دهستان شاندرمن) is in Shanderman District of Masal County, in Iran's Gilan province. It is administered from the city of Bazar Jomeh.

== Demographics ==
=== Population ===
At the time of the 2006 National Census, the rural district's population was 11,224 in 2,745 households. There were 12,512 inhabitants in 3,351 households at the following census of 2011. The 2016 census measured the population of the rural district as 10,310 in 3,215 households. The most populous of its 43 villages was Chaleh Sara, with 808 people.

=== Other villages in the rural district ===
- Anjilan
- Bitam
- Boneh Sara
- Boruj Rah
- Chapeh Zad
- Chay Khaleh
- Chit Bon
- Churk Muzan
- Deran
- Emamzadeh Shafi
- Galu Kuh
- Gaskaminjan
- Hajji Bijar va Jas Ganas
- Kharf Kureh
- Khoshkeh Darya
- Kofud
- Kofud Mozhdeh
- Kuban
- Lal Kan
- Masheh Kah
- Moaf
- Nilash
- Owlom
- Palang Sara
- Panga Posht
- Pashed
- Pashkam
- Razin Dul
- Shalekeh
- Siah Mard
- Talab Darreh
- Vezmtar
- Zarabcheh
- Zard Dul
