= Gantt (surname) =

Gantt is a surname. Notable people with the surname include:

- Bob Gantt (1922–1994), American basketball player
- David F. Gantt (1941–2020), member of the New York State Assembly
- Edward Gantt (1746–1837), American Episcopal clergyman
- Edward W. Gantt (1829–1874), American politician and Confederate soldier
- Fred Gantt (1922–2002), American basketball player
- Harvey Gantt (born 1943), architect and politician
- Henry Gantt (1861–1919), mechanical engineer and management consultant
- Love Gantt (1875–1935), American physician
- W. Horsley Gantt (1892–1980), American psychologist and physiologist
