= Toéghin =

Coordinates: 12°48′58″N 1°43′35″W

- Village
- Interactive map of Toéghin
- Country: Burkina Faso
- Region: Centre-Sud Region
- Province: Bazèga Province
- Department: Kombissiri Department

Population (2019)
  - Total: 838

Toéghin is a village in the Kombissiri Department of Bazèga Province in central Burkina Faso.

Population
Year	Pop.	±%
1985	626	—
2006	654	+4.5%
2019	838	+28.1%
