= Kourwéogo Province =

Coordinates: 12°35′N 1°48′W

Kourwéogo
- Province
- Location in Burkina Faso

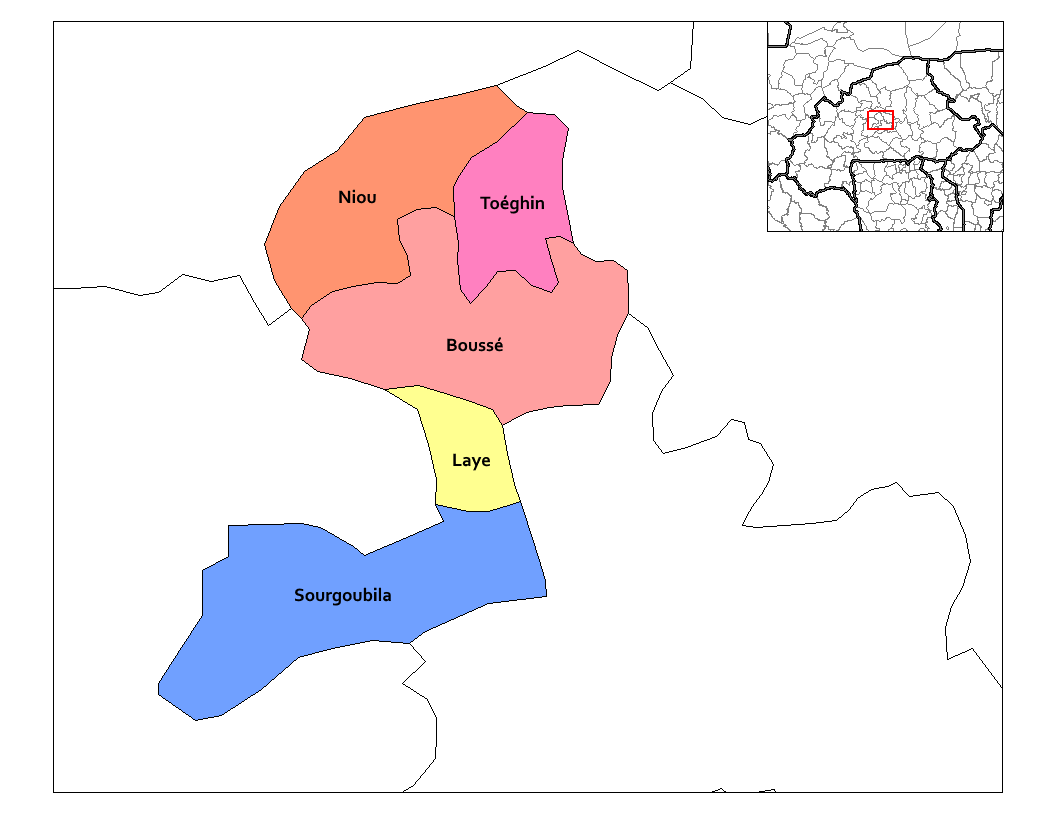
- Provincial map of its departments
- Country: Burkina Faso
- Region: Plateau-Central Region
- Capital: Boussé

Area
  - Province: 1,588 km^{2} (613 sq mi)

Population (2019 census)
  - Province: 181,202
  - Density: 114.1/km^{2} (295.5/sq mi)
  - Urban: 25,022
- Time zone: UTC+0 (GMT 0)

Kourwéogo is one of the 45 provinces of Burkina Faso, located in its Plateau-Central Region. It has a population of 181,202 (2019 census).

Its capital is Boussé.

== Departments ==
Kourweogo is divided into 5 departments:

The Departments of Kourwéogo
Department	Capital city	Population (Census 2006)
Boussé Department	Boussé	41,455
Laye Department	Laye	12,264
Niou Department	Niou	26,901
Sourgoubila Department	Sourgoubila	38,976
Toeghin Department	Toeghin	16,421

== See also ==
- Regions of Burkina Faso
- Provinces of Burkina Faso
- Departments of Burkina Faso
