= Gant =

Gant may refer to:

- Gant (surname)
- Gant (retailer), a brand of clothing and accessories

== Places ==
- Gant, Poland
- Gánt, a village in Hungary
- Gant, the Catalan name for Ghent, Belgium
- Gants Hill, in East London, England

== Entertainment ==
- 187 Lockdown, a 1990s British electronic duo that released under the name Gant

== See also ==
- Arizona v. Gant, a 2008 United States Supreme Court case
- Gantt (disambiguation)
- Gantt chart, a type of time-planning chart
- Gants
