= Masal =

City in Gilan province, Iran

Masal Persian: ماسال
- City
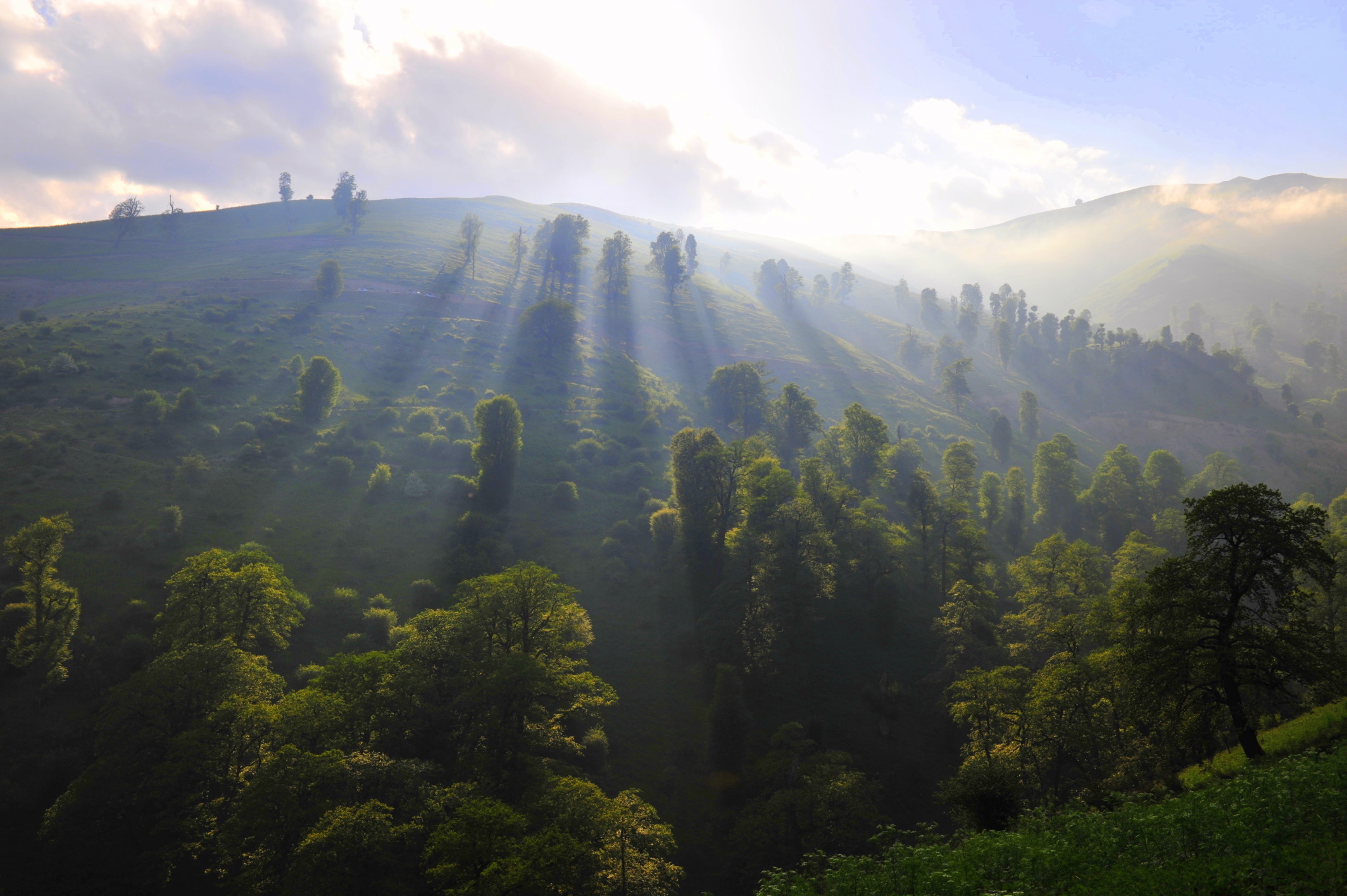
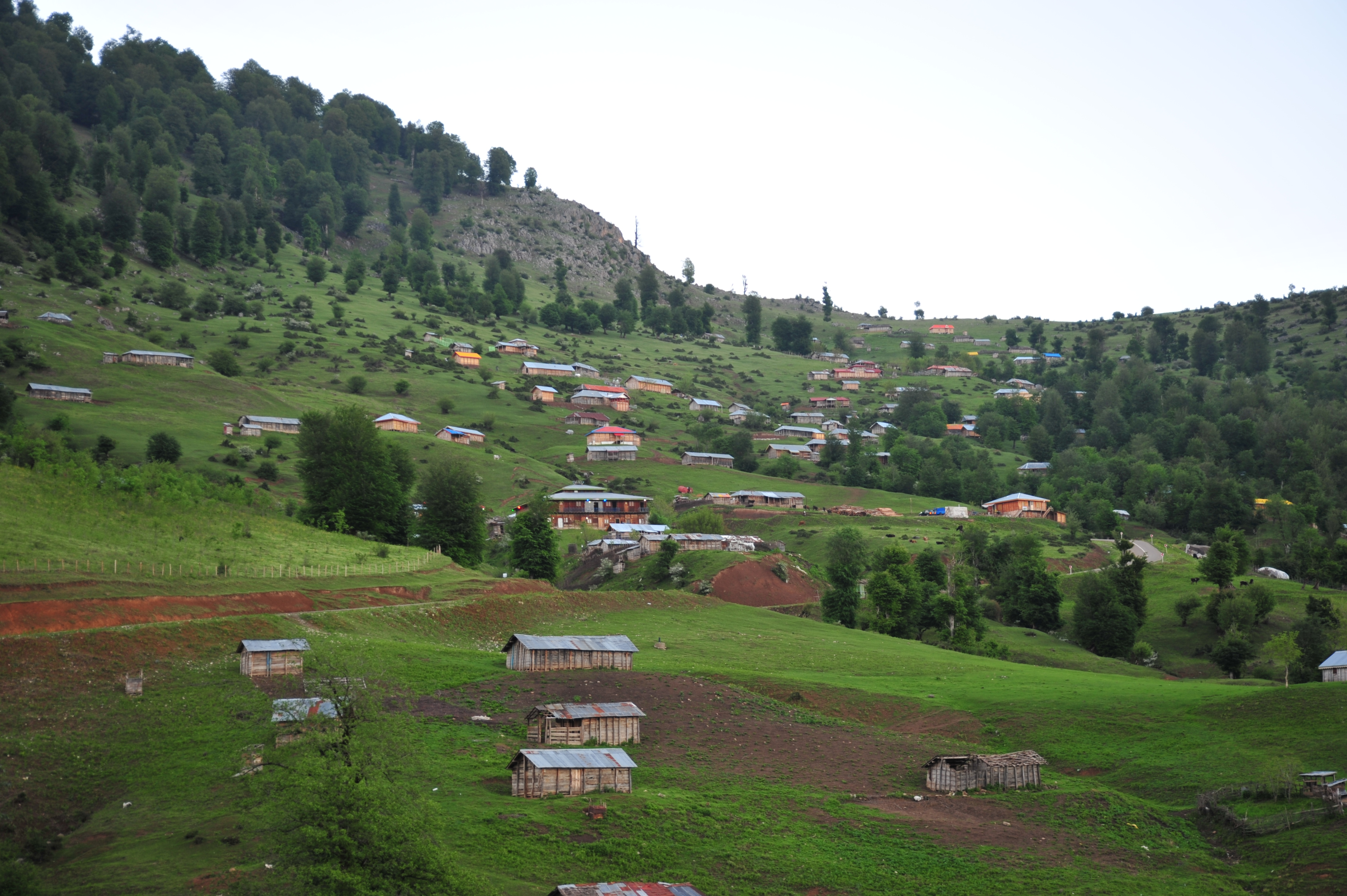
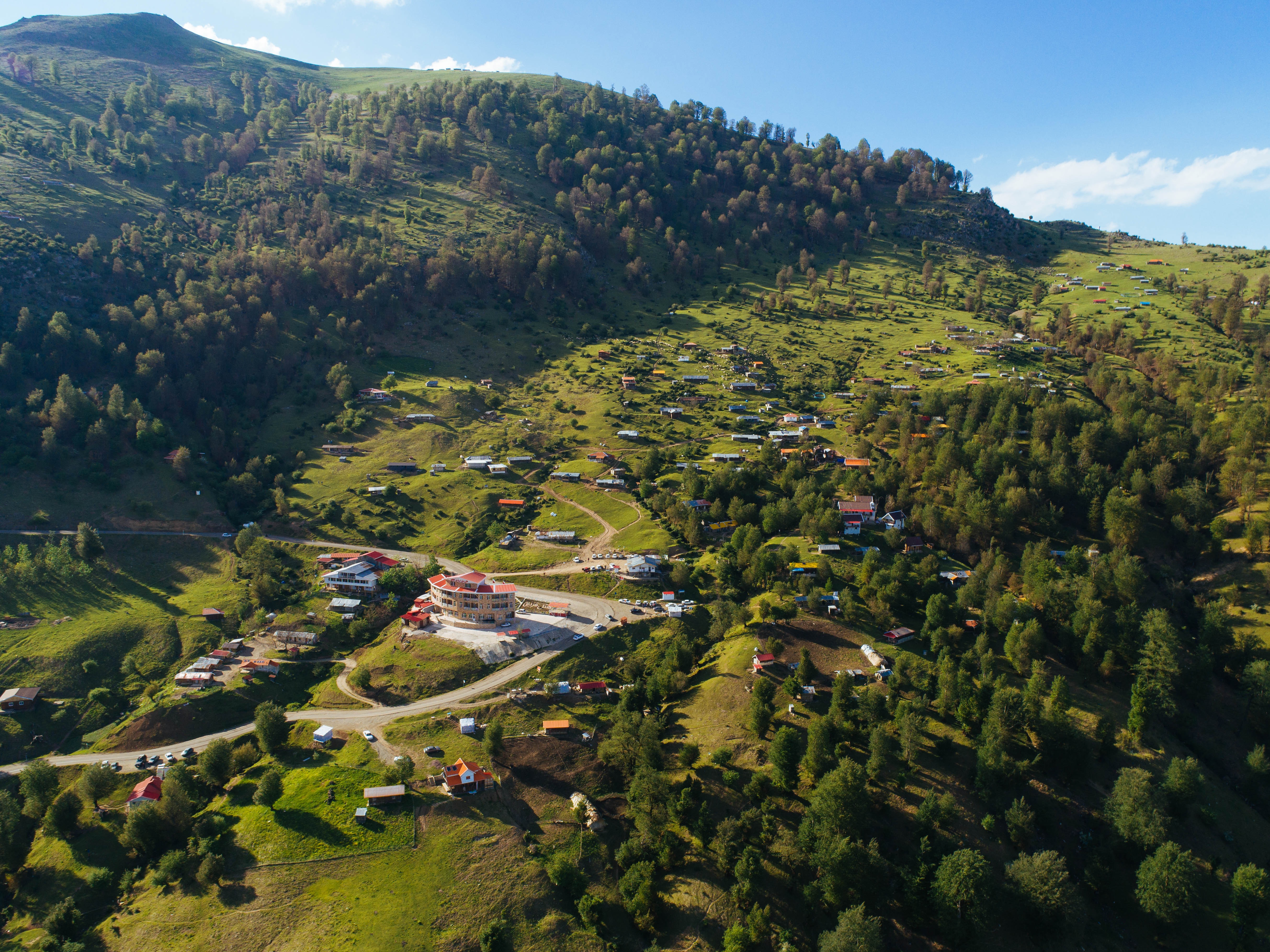
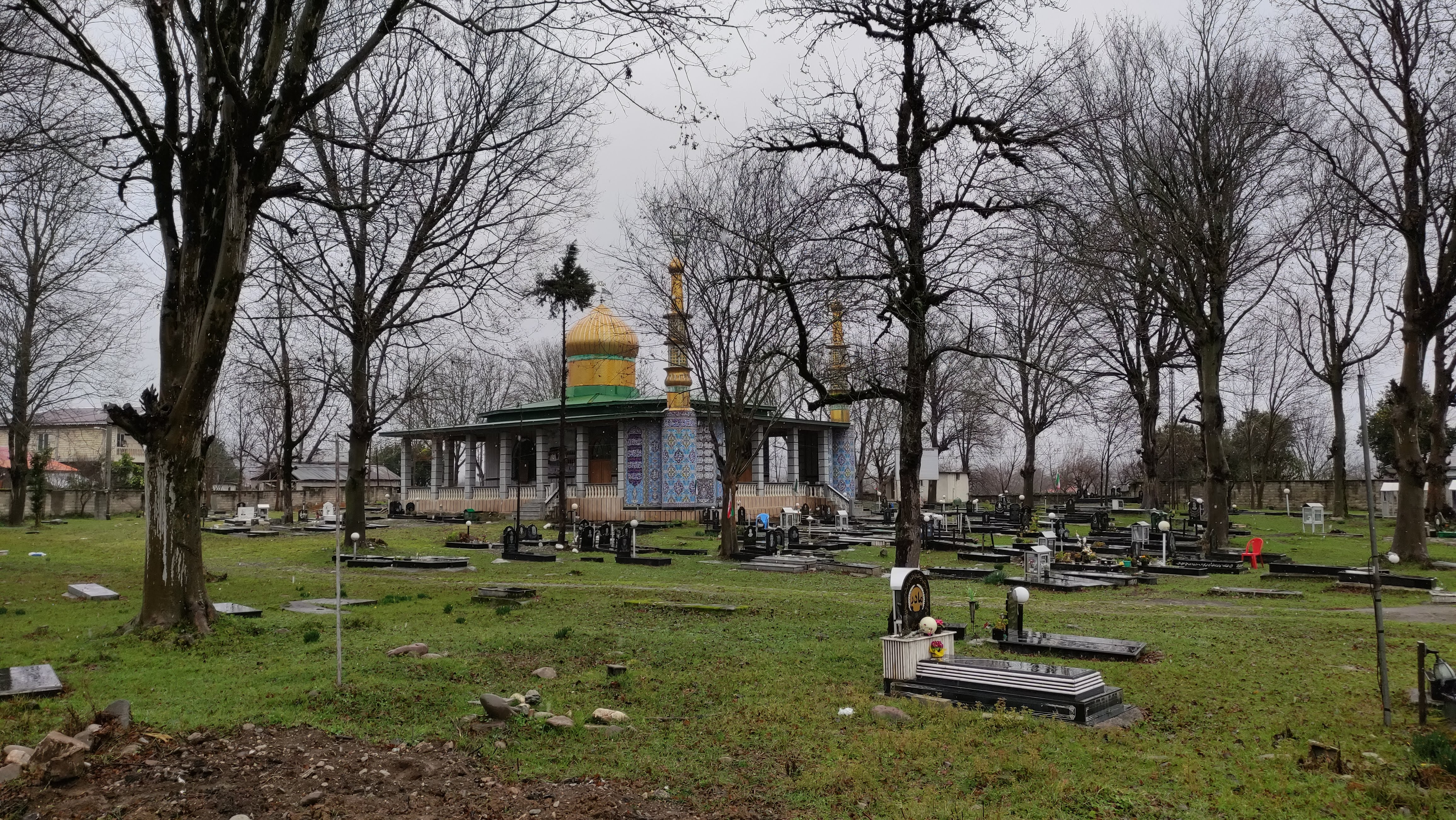

- Location within Iran
- Coordinates: 37°21′48″N 49°07′57″E
- Country: Iran
- Province: Gilan
- County: Masal
- District: Central

Population (2016)
  - Total: 17,901
- Time zone: UTC+3:30 (IRST)

Masal (Persian: ماسال) (Note: Also romanized as Māsāl; also known as Bāzār-e Māsāl, Masal-Bazar, Sar-i-Bāzar, and Sārī Bāzār Mūsār; also known as Másál (Talysh)) is a city in the Central District of Masal County, in northwestern Iran's Gilan province. The city serves as capital of both the county and the district.

== Demographics ==
=== Language ===
The population consists of Talysh people whose language is Talysh. Linguistic composition of the city.

Masal linguistic composition
language	percent
Talysh	75%
New Persian	20%
Gilaki	5%

=== Population ===
At the time of the 2006 National Census, the city's population was 10,922 in 2,986 households. The following census in 2011 counted 14,689 people in 4,394 households. The 2016 census measured the population of the city as 17,901 people in 5,759 households.
