= Gant (surname) =

Gant is a surname. Notable people with the surname include:

- Andrew Gant (born 1963), British composer, singer, author, teacher and politician
- Brian Gant (born 1952), Canadian retired soccer player
- Bruce Gant (born 1956), Canadian retired soccer player
- Cecil Gant (1913–1951), American blues singer and pianist
- Damon Gant (born 1952), fictional Los Angeles Police Chief from the game Phoenix Wright: Ace Attorney
- David Gant (born 1943), Scottish actor and model
- Harry Gant (born 1940), American motorsport driver
- JaKeenan Gant (born 1996), American basketball player for Hapoel Be'er Sheva of the Israeli Basketball Premier League
- Jerry Gant (1963–2018), American artist, poet, activist
- John Gant (born 1957), American bowler, rookie of the year 1984
- Kenneth Gant, former American football safety
- Olivia Gant (2010–2017), American female child abuse victim
- Ovidiu Ganț (born 1966), Romanian politician
- Richard Gant (born 1940), American actor
- Robert Gant (born 1968), American actor
- Ron Gant (born 1960), American professional baseball player
- William Gant (1919–1995), an associate justice of the Kentucky Court of Appeals
