= Central District (Masal County) =

District in Gilan province, Iran

Central District (Masal County) Persian: بخش مرکزی شهرستان ماسال
- District
- Location within Iran
- Coordinates: 37°19′N 49°01′E
- Country: Iran
- Province: Gilan
- County: Masal
- Established: 1997
- Capital: Masal

Population (2016)
  - Total: 30,642
- Time zone: UTC+3:30 (IRST)

The Central District of Masal County (Persian: بخش مرکزی شهرستان ماسال) is in northwestern Iran's Gilan province. Its capital is the city of Masal.

== Demographics ==
=== Population ===
At the time of the 2006 National Census, the district's population was 26,063 in 6,886 households. The following census in 2011 counted 28,797 people in 8,530 households. The 2016 census measured the population of the district as 30,642 inhabitants in 9,946 households.

=== Administrative divisions ===
Central District (Masal County) Population
Administrative Divisions	2006	2011	2016
Howmeh RD	9,652	8,962	8,209
Masal RD	5,419	5,146	4,532
Masal (city)	10,992	14,689	17,901
Total	26,063	28,797	30,642
RD = Rural District
