= Shanderman District =

District in Gilan province, Iran

Shanderman District Persian: بخش شاندرمن
- District
- Location within Iran
- Coordinates: 37°23′N 49°00′E
- Country: Iran
- Province: Gilan
- County: Masal
- Established: 1997
- Capital: Bazar Jomeh

Population (2016)
  - Total: 22,007
- Time zone: UTC+3:30 (IRST)

Shanderman District (Persian: بخش شاندرمن) is in Masal County in the northwestern Iranian province of Gilan. Its capital is the city of Bazar Jomeh.

== Demographics ==
=== Population ===
At the time of the 2006 National Census, the district's population was 21,585 in 5,442 households. The following census in 2011 counted 23,699 people in 6,463 households. The 2016 census measured the population of the district as 22,007 inhabitants in 6,955 households.

=== Administrative divisions ===
Shanderman District Population
| Administrative Divisions | 2006 | 2011 | 2016 |
|---|---|---|---|
| Shanderman RD | 11,224 | 12,512 | 10,310 |
| Sheykh Neshin RD | 6,495 | 6,694 | 5,968 |
| Bazar Jomeh (city) | 3,866 | 4,493 | 5,729 |
| Total | 21,585 | 23,699 | 22,007 |
RD: Rural District
