= Masal County =

County in Gilan province, Iran

Masal County Persian: شهرستان ماسال
- County
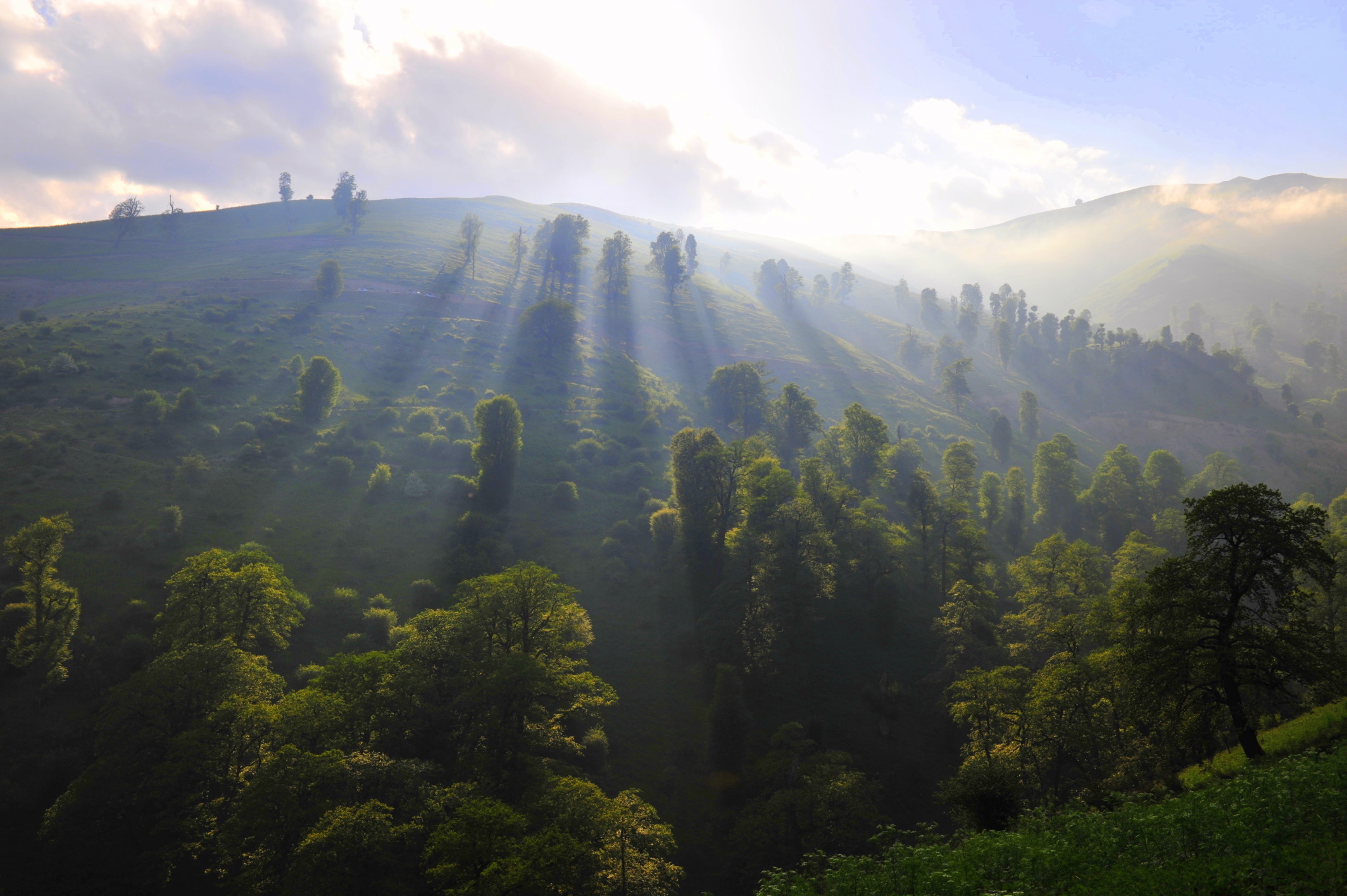

- Location of Masal County in Gilan province (top left, purple)

- Location of Gilan province in Iran
- Coordinates: 37°22′N 49°00′E
- Country: Iran
- Province: Gilan
- Established: 1997
- Capital: Masal
- Districts: Central, Shanderman

Population (2016)
  - Total: 52,649
- Time zone: UTC+3:30 (IRST)

Masal County (Persian: شهرستان ماسال) is in Gilan province, in northwestern Iran. Its capital is the city of Masal.

== Demographics ==
=== Population ===
At the time of the 2006 National Census, the county's population was 47,648 in 12,328 households. The following census in 2011 counted 52,496 people in 14,984 households. The 2016 census measured the population of the county as 52,649 in 16,901 households.

=== Administrative divisions ===
Masal County's population history and administrative structure over three consecutive censuses are shown in the following table.

Masal County Population
Administrative Divisions	2006	2011	2016
Central District	26,063	28,797	30,642
Howmeh RD	9,652	8,962	8,209
Masal RD	5,419	5,146	4,532
Masal (city)	10,992	14,689	17,901
Shanderman District	21,585	23,699	22,007
Shanderman RD	11,224	12,512	10,310
Sheykh Neshin RD	6,495	6,694	5,968
Bazar Jomeh (city)	3,866	4,493	5,729
Total	47,648	52,496	52,649
RD = Rural District

== See also ==
Media related to Masal County at Wikimedia Commons
