= List of FIFA international referees =

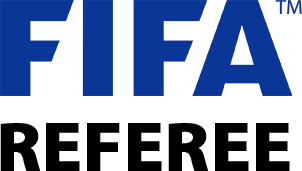
FIFA Referee Logo

Current referees are at the top of the section for each country, while entries of former referees are collapsed.

== Afghanistan ==
- Ashraf Hussainzada (2025–present)

== Albania ==
- Juxhin Xhaja (2018–)

== Algeria ==
=== Men's ===
==== Referees ====
- Mehdi Abid Charef (2011–2018)
- Abdelkader Aouissi (1966–1976)
- Abdelkrim Benghezal (1969–)
- Mohamed Benouza (2001–2016)
- Mohamed Bichari (2007–)
- Abdelaziz Chekaïmi (1963–1968)
- Mustapha Ghorbal (2014–present)
- Abdelkader Hadefi Benzellat (1963–)
- Djamel Haimoudi (2004–2015)
- Mohamed Hansal (1977–1991)
- Ahmed Khelifi (1963–)
- Mohamed Kouradji (–)
- Messaoud Koussa (–)
- Belaïd Lacarne (1978–1987)
- Rachid Medjiba (–)
- Mohamed Sendid (–)
- Mohamed Zekrini (–)

===== Video Match Officials =====
- Mehdi Abid Charef (2018)
- Mustapha Ghorbal (2024–present)

=== Women's ===
==== Referees ====
- Ghada Mehat (2022–present)
- Asma Feriel Ouahab (2021–present)

===== Video Match Officials =====
- Asma Feriel Ouahab (2024–present)

== Argentina ==
=== Men's ===
==== Referees ====
- Héctor Baldassi (2010)
- Jorge Baliño (2015–2018)
- Juan Pablo Belatti (2011–present)
- Juan Brozzi (1958)
- Javier Castrilli (1998)
- Gabriel Chade (2016–present)
- Ángel Coerezza (1970-1978)
- Pablo Gaston Echavarría (2022)
- Fernando Gabriel Echenique (2018)
- Horacio Elizondo (2006)
- Fernando David Espinoza (2016)
- Carlos Espósito (1986)
- Yael Falcón Pérez (2022)
- Roberto Goicoechea (1966)
- Darío Herrera (2015)
- Arturo Ithurralde (1982)
- Francisco Lamolina (1994)
- Nicolás Lamolina (2020)
- Juan Carlos Loustau (1990)
- Patricio Loustau (2011–2022)
- José Macías (1930)
- Andrés Luis Merlos (2020)
- Luis Pestarino (1974)
- Néstor Pitana (2014-2018)
- Fernando Rapallini (2014)
- Ángel Sánchez (2002)
- Facundo Tello (2019)

==== Video Match Officials ====
- Jorge Baliño (2022–)
- Germán Delfino (2021–)
- Hernán Mastrángelo (2023–)
- Patricio Loustau (2021–2022)
- Silvio Trucco (2022–)
- Mauro Vigliano (2013–)

=== Women's ===
==== Referees ====
- Adriana Antonella Álvarez De Olivera (2022)
- Estela Álvarez de Olivera (2005)
- Gabriela Elizabeth Coronel (2021)
- Salomé di Iorio (2004)
- Roberta Echeverría (2020)
- Laura Fortunato (2010)

==== Video Match Officials ====
- Salomé di Iorio (2004–)

== Armenia ==
=== Men's ===
==== Assistant Referees ====
- Sargis Hovhannisyan (2021–)

=== Women's ===
==== Assistant Referees ====
- Liana Grigoryan (2006–2010)

== Australia ==
=== Men's ===
==== Referees ====
- Kurt Ams (2019–)
- Jonathan Barreiro (2019–)
- Chris Beath (2011–2023)
- Daniel Elder (2022–)
- Shaun Evans (2017–)
- Alireza Faghani (2008–present) (Note: Alireza Faghani was a member of the Iran list between 2008 and 2022)
- Adam Kersey (2022–)
- Alexander King (2020–)

==== Video Match Officials ====
- Chris Beath (2021–2023)
- Shaun Evans (2017–)

=== Women's ===
==== Referees ====
- Rebecca Durcau (2017–)
- Kate Jacewicz (2011–)
- Lara Lee (2019–)
- Casey Reibelt (2014–)

==== Assistant Referees ====
- Sarah Ho (2004–)
- Michelle Smith (Treloar) (2004–)

==== Video Match Officials ====
- Sarah Ho (2021–)
- Kate Jacewicz (2021–)
- Casey Reibelt (2014–)

== Austria ==
=== Referees ===
- Walter Altmann (2020)
- Christian-Petru Ciochirca (2020)
- Sebastian Gishamer (2019)
- Cristopher Jaeger (2018)
- Harald Lechner (2010)
- Manuel Schuettengruber (2014)
- Julian Weinberger (2018)

== Azerbaijan ==
=== Men's ===
==== Referees ====
- Aliyar Aghayev (2013–)
- Rauf Jabarov (2019)
- Elchin Masiyev (2021)

== Bahamas ==
- Evens Julmis (2025–present)

== Bahrain ==
- Ibrahim Youssef Al-Doy
- Mandi Jassim
- Nawaf Shukralla (2008–)

== Bangladesh ==
=== Former ===
- Zahurul Alam (1971–1980)
- Nani Bashak (1975)
- Munir Hossain (1974–1983)
- Tayeb Hasan Shamsuzzaman (1999–2016)

== Belarus ==
- Alexey Kulbakov (2005–2024)
- Denis Scherbakov (2010–)
- Sergey Tsinkevich (2010–2019)

=== Former ===
- Vadim Zhuk (1988–1997)
- Sergey Shmolik (1994–2008)
- Vitaly Sevostyanik (2009–2012)
- Valery Vyalichka (2002–2011)

== Belgium ==
- Lothar D'hondt (2023–present)
- Erik Lambrechts (2014–present)
- Jonathan Lardot (2012–present)
- Bram Van Driessche (2019–present)
- Nathan Verboomen (2019–present)
- Jasper Vergoote (2023–present)
- Lawrence Visser (2017–present)

=== Former ===
- Paul Allaerts (2000–2009)
- Frank De Bleeckere (1998–2012)
- Alexis Ponnet (1975–1984)
- Marcel Van Langenhove
- Guy Goethals
- John Langenus
- Louis Baert
- Alexandre Boucaut (2009–2022)
- Sébastien Delferiere (2010–2018)
- Jérôme Efong Nzolo (2008–2015)
- Serge Gumienny (2003–2018)

== Benin ==
- Coffi Codjia (1994–2011)

== Bhutan ==
- Pema Tshewang (2014–present)

== Bolivia ==
- Raúl Orosco (2009–present)
- Gery Vargas (2012–present)
- Ivo Méndez (2017–present)

=== Former ===
- Luis Barrancos
- René Ortubé (1992–2009)

== Bosnia and Herzegovina ==
- Irfan Peljto (2015–present)
- Ognjen Valjić (2011–)

== Brazil ==
- Anderson Daronco (2017–)
- Bruno Arleu de Araújo
- Flávio Rodrigues de Souza
- Luiz Flavio de Oliveira
- Nathan Igor Sampaio Bezerra
- Rafael Traci
- Raphael Claus (2015–)
- Rodolpho Toski
- Wagner do Nascimento Magalhães

=== Former ===
- Bráulio da Silva Machado (2019–2020)
- Edílson Pereira de Carvalho
- Arnaldo Cézar Coelho (1969–1989)
- Marcelo de Lima Henrique (2008–2014)
- Salvio Fagundes (2005–2011)
- Romualdo Arppi Filho (1963–1990)
- Márcio Rezende de Freitas (1989–2005)
- Leonardo Gaciba (2005–2010)
- Héber Lopes (2002–2016)
- Ricardo Marques (2009–2019)
- Ana Karina Marques Valentin Alves (2009–2020)
- Renato Marsiglia (1990–1994)
- Paulo César de Oliveira (1999–2014)
- Sandro Ricci (2011–2018)
- Wilton Sampaio (2013–2022)
- Jorge José Emiliano dos Santos
- Wilson Seneme (2006–2014)
- Carlos Eugênio Simon (1998–2010)
- José Roberto Wright (1978–1993)
- Raphael Claus (2015–2020)

== Bulgaria ==
- Georgi Kabakov (2013–present)
- Tsvetan Krastev (2014–2016)
- Stanislav Todorov (2006–)

=== Former ===
- Bogdan Dotchev
- Galina Doneva (referee) (1996–2005) First international woman referee

== Burundi ==
- Pacifique Ndabihawenimana (2013–present)

== Cameroon ==
- Néant (Sidi) Alioum (2008–)

== Canada ==
The following Canadians are match officials.

- Lyres Arfa (2021–present)
- Micheal Barwegen (2018–present)
- Marie-Soleil Beaudoin (2014–present)
- Filip Dujic (2024–present)
- Drew Fischer (2015–present)
- Stéphanie Fortin (2019–present)
- Marie-Han Gagnon-Chretien (2015–present)
- Pierre-Luc Lauzière (2021–present)
- Gerard-Kader Lebuis (2024–present)
- Gabrielle Lemieux (2022–present)
- Myriam Marcotte (2019–present)
- Carly Shaw-MacLaren (2019–present)
- Melissa Snedden (2018–present)
- Stefan Tanaka-Freundt (2022–present)
- Chris Wattam (2018–present)

== Central African Republic ==
- Eudoxie Séverine Dertin (2012–)
- Prince Arcy Dongombe(2009–)
- Jean Marc Ganamandji (2014–)
- Jean Marie Koyakobo (2013–)
- Sosthene Ngbokaye (2008–)
- Etienne Gabato (2015–)
- André Kolissala (2015–)

== Chad ==
- Idriss Biani (2008–)
- Adam Cordier (2005–)
- Lamngar Lare (2010–)
- Alhadi Mahamat (2012–)
- Oumar Mahamat Tahir (2006–)
- Issa Abdelhadi (2015–)
- Pousri Armi Alfred (2017–)
- Ahmat Amara Hassane (2017–)
- Baba Adam Mahamat (2022)

== Chile ==
- Paola Andrea Barria Panes (2013–)
- Julio Bascuñán (2011–present)
- Barbra Lynda Celeste Bastias Hormazabal (2006–)
- Maria Belen Carvajal Peña (2010–)
- Gastón Castro (1978–1993)
- Carlos Chandía (2001–2010)
- Eduardo Gamboa (2003–present)
- Jorge Osorio (2006–2017)
- Enrique Osses (2005–2016)
- Patricio Polic (2010–)
- Pablo Pozo (1999–2010)
- Hernán Silva
- Roberto Tobar (2011–)
- Claudio Puga (2007–2016)
- Jacqueline Angelica Vargas Erices (2013–)
- Mario Sánchez Yantén (1994–2001)
- Piero Maza (2018–present)
- Cristián Garay (2019–present)
- Felipe González (2019–present)
- Angelo Hermosilla Baeza (2020–)

== China PR ==
- Sun Baojie (1997–2010)
- Qi Fan (2008–)
- Fu Ming (2014–present)
- Jin He (2013–)
- Juan Li (2012–)
- Ma Ning (2011–)
- Liang Qin (2010–)
- Zhenlu Shi (2013–)
- Tan Hai (2005–)
- Wang Di (2011–2017; 2021–present)
- Jia Wang (2007–)
- Zhe Wang (2011–present)
- Kun Ai (2016–)
- Zhang Lei (2004–2011; 2017–)
- Shen Yinhao (2018–)

== Chinese Taipei ==
- Chen Hsin-chuan (2015–)
- Kao Jung-fang (2009–)
- Yu Ming-hsun (2002–)

== Colombia ==
- Gilberto Aristizábal (1973–1983)
- Hernando Buitrago (2006–2015)
- Maria Victoria Daza Ortiz (2014–)
- Jesús Díaz (1981–1989)
- Wilson Lamouroux (2013–2017)
- Yeimy Lucero Martinez Valverde (2010–)
- Viviana Muñoz Durango (2011–)
- Juan Pontón (2014–2016)
- Wilmar Roldán (2002–)
- Óscar Ruiz (1995–2011)
- Luis Sánchez (2012–)
- John Toro Rendón (1990–2002)
- José Torres Cadena (1981–2002)
- Adrián Vélez (2011–2016)
- Gustavo Murillo (2016–)
- Andrés Rojas (2017–)
- Nicolás Gallo Barragán (2018–)
- Carlos Herrera (2018–)

== Comoros ==
- Ali Adelaïd (2009–)
- Soulaimane Ansudane (2010–)
- Noiret Jim Bacari (2012–)

== Congo ==
- Omer Yengo (1990–1998)
- Jean Michel Moukoko (2003–)
- Chancelle Cynthia Imane Ngakosso (2013–)
- Messie Nkounkou (2012–)
- Serge Soumou (2010–)
- Lazard Tsiba (2009–)
- Fitial Charel Just Kokolo (2015–)

== Congo DR ==
- Julie Kanyembo Kyabuta (2011–)
- Jean Claude Kinamvuidi Fuengi (2014–)
- Achille Madila (2012–)
- Jean-Jacques Ndala (2013–)
- Mupemba Ignace Nkongolo (2012–)
- Numbi Pierre Kibingo (2015–)
- Jean Pierre Tshiamala Kabangu (2016–)
- Kabanga Yannick Malala (2015–)

== Cook Islands ==
- John Pareanga (2005–)
- Tupou Patia (2011–)

== Costa Rica ==
- Marianela Araya Cruz (2014–)
- Rodrigo Badilla
- Henry Bejarano (2011–present)
- Ricardo Cerdas Sanchez (2006–2014)
- Hugo Cruz (2008–present)
- William Mattus(2002–)
- Ricardo Montero (2012–present)
- Berny Ulloa Morera
- Luis Paulino Siles
- Jeffrey Solís (2009–present)
- Wálter Quesada (2001–2016)
- Juan Gabriel Calderón (2017–)
- Keylor Herrera (2019–)
- Benjamín Pineda (2019–)

== Côte d'Ivoire ==
- Aya Irene Ahoua (2006–)
- Abou Coulibaly (2013–)
- Denis Dembélé (2009–)
- Noumandiez Doué (2004–2015)
- Tangba Kambou (2011–)
- Zomadre Sonia Kore (2013–)
- Kouamé N'Dri (2009–)
- Bienvenu Sinko (2012–)
- Kouassi Frederic Francois Biro (2015–)
- Allou Franc Eric Miessan (2016–)
- Ibrahim Kalilou Traoré (2018–)

== Croatia ==
- Ivan Bebek (2003–)
- Vesna Budimir (2009–)
- Ante Čulina (2023–)
- Mihaela Gurdon-Bašimamović (2001–)
- Fran Jović (2014–present)
- Ante Kulušić (2008–2021)
- Ivana Martinčić (2014–)
- Damir Matovinović
- Tihomir Pejin (2014–)
- Marijo Strahonja (2004–2016)
- Ante Vučemilovic-Šimunović (2007–)
- Domagoj Vučkov (2009–)
- Mario Zebec (2016–)

== Cuba ==
- Irazema Aguilera Fuentes (2002–)
- Marcos Brea (2008–)
- Yadel Martínez (2013–present)
- Annia Navarrete Viera (2006–)
- Michel Rodríguez (2015–)

== Curaçao ==
- Norberto Da Silva Costa (2023–)

== Cyprus ==
- Yannis Anastasiou (2010–2021)
- Vasilis Dimitriou (2012–)
- Sofia Karagiorgi (2007–)
- Christos Nicolaides (2009–2017)
- Marios Panayi (2010–)
- Andreas Demetriou (1999–2007)
- Leontios Trattou (2006–2019)
- Vasilis Demetriou
- Nikolas Neokleous
- Loukas Soteriou
- Chrysovalantis Theouli
- Andreas Ilia Argyrou

== Czech Republic ==
- Petr Ardeleanu (2013–present)
- Jana Adámková (2007–)
- Jiří Jech (2007–2010)
- Jan Jílek (2007–2010)
- Libor Kovařík (2006–)
- Eliska Kralovec-Kramlova (2014–)
- Václav Krondl (1993–1998)
- Pavel Královec (2005–present)
- Radek Matějek (2004–)
- Pavel Orel (20xx–present)
- Radek Příhoda (2008–)
- Zbynek Proske (2014–present)
- Milan Šedivý (2003−2005)
- Olga Zadinova (2011–)
- Miroslav Zelinka (2011–present)

== Denmark ==
- Kenn Hansen (2011–2015)
- Jakob Kehlet (2011–)
- Kristina Husballe (2012–)
- Mads-Kristoffer Kristoffersen (2013–present)
- Claus Bo Larsen (1996–2010)
- Henning Lund-Sørensen
- Jens Maae (2014–present)
- Kim Milton Nielsen (1988–2006)
- Peter Mikkelsen (1986–1996)
- Anders Poulsen (2014–2018)
- Peter Rasmussen (2006–)
- Marianne Svendsen (2005–)
- Michael Tykgaard (2012–present)
- Nicolai Vollquartz (1999–2010)
- Carl W. Hansen (1962–1969)
- Jørn Larsen (1997–2000)

== Djibouti ==
- Djamal Aden (2012–)
- Farah Aden (2012–)
- Souleiman Ahmed Djama (2015–)
- Bilal Abdallah Ismael (2017–)
- Mohamed Diraneh Guedi (2018–)

== Dominica ==
- Rhomie Blanc (2015–)
- Charvis Delsol (2017–)

== Dominican Republic ==
- Juan Carlos Hidalgo Baez (2012–)
- Sandy Vásquez (2012–)
- Ramona Zegala Noasil (2013–)
- Randy Encarnación (2019–)
- Milagros Carmona
- Adonis Carrasco (2023–)

== Ecuador ==
- José Carpio (2002–)
- Juan Carlos Cartenga (2015–)
- Susana Nataly Corella Manzo (2014–)
- Maria Auxiliadora Cornejo Anchundia (2012–)
- Vinicio Espinel (2015–)
- Juana del Rocio Delgado Torres (2006–)
- José Luis Espinel Mena (2007–2014)
- Johana Nataly Haro Capelo (2014–)
- Alfredo Stalin Intriago Ortega (2004–)
- Elías Jácome (1980–1999)
- Diego Lara (2009–present)
- Byron Moreno (1996–2003)
- Carlos Orbe (2014–present)
- Omar Ponce (2009–present)
- Pedro Ramos (2001–2007)
- Carlos Vera (2006–present)
- Roddy Zambrano (2012–present)
- Juan Albarracín (2015–present)
- Luis Quiroz (2017–present)
- Guillermo Guerrero (2017–present)

== Egypt ==
- Essam Abd El Fatah (2001–2010)
- Gamal El-Ghandour (1993–2002)
- Mahmoud Ashour (2011–)
- Mahmoud El Banna (2014–)
- Mohamed El Hanafy (2014–)
- Mohamed Farouk Mahmoud (2006–)
- Gehad Grisha (2008–2021)
- Mohamed Maarouf (2014–)
- Sara Mohamed Ramadan (2014–)
- Ibrahim Nour El Din (2014–)
- Mahmoud Bassiouny (2015–)
- Amin Mohamed Omar (2017–)
- Ahmed Mahrous Mahmoud Ahmed Hassan (2018–)
- Mohamed Adel Elsaid Hussien (2018–)
- Ahmed El Ghandour (2018–)
- Ahmed Abou Elela (2005–2015)

== El Salvador ==
- Joel Aguilar (2001–2019)
- Elmer Bonilla (2006–present)
- Mirian Patricia Leon Serpas (2013–)
- Marlon Mejía (2006–present)
- Cibeles Liduvina Miranda Valencia (2014–)
- Vilma Hayde Montes Lico (2014–)
- Jaime Herrera (2016–)
- Ismael Cornejo (2016–)
- Germán Martínez (2017–)
- Iván Barton (2018–)

== England ==
Years refer to seasons on the National List of Referees. These officials operate at Football League level or above. Seasons spent as a Premier League referee or FIFA referee are indicated in addition where they apply.

- James Adcock 2011–
- Paul Alcock 1988–2002; Premier League 1995–2000
- Ray Aldous 1962–1966
- David Allison 1980–1997; Premier League 1992–1994
- Gary Aplin 1984–1991
- Bob Armstrong 1971–1974
- Paul Armstrong 2000–2008
- Neville Ashley 1974–1988
- Gerald Ashby 1985–1998; Premier League 1992–1998; FIFA List 1992–1994
- Jim Ashworth 1983–1991
- Ken Aston 1955–1963; FIFA List 1960–1963
- Martin Atkinson 2003–2005; Premier League 2004–2022; FIFA List 2006–2018
- Stuart Attwell 2007–2016; Premier League 2008–2010, 2016–; FIFA List 2009–
- David Axcell 1981–1993
- Mick Bailey 1986–1998
- Steve Baines 1995–2003
- Ken Baker 1971–1987
- Morris Baker 1976–1982
- Peter Baldwin 1962–1974
- John Ball 1984–1986
- Peter Bankes 2014–
- Allan Banks 1979–1986
- Graham Barber 1994–2004: Premier League 1996–2004; FIFA List 1998–2003
- Ron Barker 1967–1971
- Keren Barratt 1981–1994; Premier League 1992–1994
- Neale Barry 1993–2006; Premier League 1997–2005
- Frank Bassett 1971–1973
- Carl Bassindale assistant referee 1987–2007
- Anthony Bates 1996–2013
- Steve Bates 1977–1984
- Vernon Batty 1962–1973
- Richard Beeby 1999–2009
- Steven Bell 1989–1993
- Alan Bennett 1989–1992
- Steve Bennett 1995–2010; Premier League 1999–2010; FIFA List 2001–2006
- Jim Bent 1972–1978
- Carl Berry 2011–2016
- Don Biddle 1971–1979
- Mike Bidmead 1979–1981
- Ray Bigger 1989–1995
- John Blackwell 1940
- Martin Bodenham 1981–1998; Premier League 1992–1998; FIFA List 1992–1995
- Bill Bombroff 1978–1980
- Alf Bond 1951–1959; FIFA List
- Darren Bond 2013–
- Alan Bone 1968–1971
- Russell Booth 2004–2013
- Jim Borrett 1981–1994; Premier League 1992–1994
- Terry Bosi 1972–1977
- Carl Boyeson 2002–
- Dr. Dennis Brady 1963–1969
- John Brandwood 1990–2002
- Peter Brandwood 1956–1966
- Steve Bratt 2006–2010, 2012–2016
- Jeff Bray 1978–1987
- Derek Brazier 1982–1985
- Kevin Breen 1985–1996
- John Brooks 2016–
- Mark Brown 2010–2018
- Alf Buksh 1983–1993
- Mike Bull 2013–2016
- Jack Bullough 1960–1966
- Tom Bune 1974–1985
- Les Burden 1975–1985
- Bill Burns 1988–2001
- Ken Burns 1961–1978; FIFA List 1969–1978
- Norman Burtenshaw 1962–1973; FIFA List 1965–1973
- John Busby 2016–
- Keith Butcher 1974–1980
- Alan Butler 1994–2004
- Noel Butler 1984–1990
- Peter Bye 1961–1968
- Lee Cable 1998–2005
- George Cain 1993–2004
- Norman Callender 1965–1968
- Vic Callow 1979–1994; Premier League 1992–1994
- Roy Capey 1967–1977
- Jim Carr 1959–1968
- John Carter 1987–1993
- Bill Castle 1967–1974
- Jim Cattlin 1960–1967
- Ray Chadwick 1975–1983
- Arnold Challinor 1977–1984
- Ron Challis 1968–1981
- Derek Civil 1972–1983
- Richard Clark 2012–
- David Clarke 1978–1980
- Jim Clarke 1966–1968
- Mark Clattenburg 2000–2017; Premier League 2004–2017; FIFA List 2006–2017
- Robin Clay 1973–1975
- Bill Clements 1954–1966; FIFA List
- Brian Coddington 1991–1994, 1996–1999
- Lee Collins 2011–
- Steve Cook 2007–2010
- Colin Cooke 1964–1967
- Keith Arthur Cooper (Swindon) 1987–1996
- Mark Cooper 2000–2004
- David Coote 2010–2014; Premier League 2018–2023 FIFA List 2020–2022
- Dennis Corbett 1963–1972
- Malcolm Cotton 1984–1987
- Frank Coultas 1957 F.A. Cup Final referee
- David Counsell 1966–1970
- George Courtney 1974–1992: FIFA list 1977–1991
- Mark Cowburn 1998–2007
- Frank Cowen 1952–1969
- Tony Cox 1978–1980
- Ron Crabb 1970–1978
- Ernest Crawford 1954–1966; FIFA List 1964–1966
- David Crick 1997–2004
- Alan Crickmore 1982–1984
- Phil Crossley 2002–2011
- Walter Crossley 1959–1967
- Ian Cruikshanks 1989–1997
- Brian Curson 2000–2006
- Lol Cussons 1967–1969
- Ken Dagnall 1955–1968: FIFA List 1962–1968
- Roy Darlington 1966–1971
- Brian Daniels 1970s & early 80s
- Paul Danson 1987–2005; Premier League 1994–1997
- Harold Davey 1965–1976
- Andy Davies 2012–
- Geoff Davis 1964–1966
- Tommy Dawes 1958–1974
- Alan Dawson 1988–1995
- Darren Deadman 2008–
- John Deakin 1980–1992
- Mike Dean 1997–2000 : Premier League 2000–2022; FIFA list 2003–2013
- Bob Desmond 2006–2007
- Roger Dilkes 1983–1997
- Mike Dimblebee 1980–1988
- Arthur Dimond 1965–1971
- Alan Dobson 1979–1981
- Philip Don 1986–1995: Premier League 1992–1995; FIFA list 1992–1995
- Steve Dorr 2005–2009
- Phil Dowd 1998–2016: Premier League 2001–2016
- Colin Downey 1977–1988
- Darren Drysdale 2004–2009, 2010–
- Scott Duncan 2012–2020
- Steve Dunn 1992–2006: Premier League 1995–2006; FIFA list 1997–2002
- Paul Durkin 1987–2004: Premier League 1992–2004; FIFA list 1994–2000
- Andy D'Urso 1994–2015: Premier League 1999–2005; FIFA list 2001–2005
- Cliff Duxbury 1960–1966
- Roy Egan 1963–1968
- David Elleray 1986–2003: Premier League 1992–2003; FIFA list 1992–1999
- Arthur Ellis FIFA list 1950s & 60s
- Harry Ellis 1967–1970
- Geoff Eltringham 2009–
- Darren England 2015–2020 FIFA List 2022–
- Eddie Evans 2002–2005
- Karl Evans 2007–2011
- Colin Fallon 1970–1973
- Terry Farley 1975–1981
- Les Faulkner 1963–1966
- Amy Elizabeth Fearn nee Rayner assistant referee 2004–
- Douglas Fieldsend 1968–1970
- Carl Finch 1996–1999
- Jim Finney 1959–1972: FIFA list 1962–1971
- Tom Fitzharris 1981–1993
- Mick Fletcher 1995–2006
- George Flint 1973–1982
- Allan Flood 1986–1995
- Peter Foakes 1987–1995: Premier League 1992–1994
- Chris Foy 1996–2015: Premier League 2001–2015
- Dave Foster 2006–2012
- David Frampton 1990–1994: Premier League 1993–1994
- Graham Frankland 1995–2003
- Kevin Friend 2003–2009 : Premier League 2009–2022
- Roger Furnandiz 1994–2002
- Maurice Fussey 1960–1972
- Dermot Gallagher 1990–2007: Premier League 1992–2007; FIFA list 1994–2002
- Eric Garner 1972–1977
- Sarah Garratt assistant referee 2010–2011, 2012–2016
- Phil Gibbs 2008–2016
- Jarred Gillett 2019– FIFA List (ENG) 2023– (AUS) 2013–2019
- Tony Glasson 1973–1983
- Norman Glover 1977–1986
- John Goggins 1972–1976
- John Gow 1963–1978
- Fred Graham 2004–2005, 2006–2016
- Nathaniel Graham 1968–1970
- Alan A Green 1968–1970
- Alf Grey 1972–1983: FIFA list 1977–1983
- Ron Groves 1984–1994
- George Grundy 1961–1966
- Allan Gunn 1977–1994: Premier League 1992–1994; FIFA list 1986–1991
- Ray Guy 1982–1987
- Keith Hackett 1976–1994: Premier League 1992–1994; FIFA list 1981–1991
- Harold Hackney 1959–1968, 1971–1977
- Andy Hall 1997–2012
- Bill J Hall 1970–1974
- Andy Haines 2007–
- Mark Halsey 1996–2013: Premier League 1999–; FIFA list 2001–2006
- Bob Hamer 1985–1993
- Les Hamer 1954–1968
- Alex Hamil 1974–1983
- Bill Handley 1962–1969
- Darren Handley 2014–
- Roy Harper 1961–1969
- Paul Harrison 1986–1995
- Arthur Hart 1970–1975
- Robbie Hart 1986–1996: Premier League 1992–1996
- George Hartley 1968–1973
- Les Hayes 1972–1977
- Peter Hayward 1968–1969
- Mark Haywood 2006–
- Malcolm Heath 1979–1987
- Dennis Hedges 1979–1990
- Grant Hegley 2001–2012
- Terry Heilbron 1993–2000
- Ian Hemley 1985–1996
- Ian Hendrick 1983–1993
- Mark Heywood 2011–
- Brian Hill 1978–1995: Premier League 1992–1995; FIFA list 1985–1993
- Gordon Hill 1966–1975
- Keith Hill 1998–2011, 2013–
- Jeff Hill 1966–1969
- John Holbrook 1993–1995
- Terry Holbrook 1982–1993: Premier League 1993–1995
- Bill Holian 1963–1967
- Arthur Holland 1951–1964; FIFA List
- John Homewood 1966–1979: FIFA list 1972–1979
- Simon Hooper 2008– : Premier League 2018–
- Graham Horwood 2007–2011, 2013–
- John Hough 1973–1986
- Cliff Howell 1970–1974
- Kevin Howley 1954–1971: FIFA list 1958–1971
- Allan Hughes 1975–1978
- Edward Hughes 1976–1979
- John Hunting 1968–1984: FIFA list 1973–1984
- David Hutchinson 1978–1990
- Brett Huxtable 2016–
- Eddie Ilderton 2002–
- John Ireland 1986–1988
- Brian James 1975–1977
- Mike James 1981–1993
- Vince James 1961–1974
- Tony Jenkins 1977–1979
- Eric Jennings 1954–1970: FIFA list: 1966–1970
- Kevin Johnson 2014–
- Ray Johnson 1965–1973
- Walter Johnson 1970–1978
- Ted Jolly 1970–1975
- Arthur Jones 1963–1977
- Mike Jones 1997–2018 Premier League 2008–2018
- Peter Jones 1988–2002: Premier League 1994–2002; FIFA list 1996–1999
- Robert Jones 2016– FIFA List 2023–
- Ron Jones 1975–1976
- Trevor Jones 1996–2002
- Trevor A Jones 1982–1986
- Bill Jordan 1998–2003
- Phil Joslin 1999–2008
- Ross Joyce 2015–
- Ron Judson 1970–1972
- Chris Kavanagh 2014–2017; Premier League 2017– FIFA List 2019–
- Alan Kaye 1999–2005
- Syd Kayley 1963–1973
- Jack Kelly 1954–1962; FIFA List
- Mike Kerkhof 1968–1974
- Trevor Kettle 2003–
- Gordon Kew 1966–1977: FIFA list 1974–1977
- John Key 1981–1994 Premier League
- Nick Kinseley 2015–
- Roger Kirkpatrick 1966–1979
- John Kirkby 1987–2000
- Fred Kirkham 1903–1907
- Tom Kirkham (refereed 1902 FA Cup Final)
- David Laing 1965–1973
- Oliver Langford 2009–
- David Laws 1995–2003
- Graham Laws 1996–2010
- Ken Leach 1992–2000
- Tony Leake 1995–2006
- Ralph Lee 1970–1976
- Rayford Lee 2006–2008
- Alex Lees 1972–1978
- David Letts 1979–1985
- Gary Lewis 2004–2006, 2007–2008
- Gerrard Lewis 1967–1971
- Ray Lewis 1975–1993: Premier League 1992–1993; FIFA list 1989–1991
- Rob Lewis 2006–2008, 2010–
- William Ling World Cup Final referee 1954
- James Linington 2008–
- Derek Lloyd 1974–1983
- Tom Lockett 1967–1969
- Stephen Lodge 1987–2001: Premier League 1992–2001; FIFA list 1992–1997
- Eddie Lomas 1993–2001
- John Lovatt 1979–1987
- Michael Lowe 1972–1982
- Jack Lowry 1963–1965
- Terry Lunt 1989–1997
- Ken Lupton 1985–1995
- Danny Lyden 1963–1972: FIFA list c. 1969–1972
- Kevin Lynch 1992–2000
- Andy Madley 2011–2019 FIFA List 2020–
- Robert Madley 2010–2018 Premier League 2013–2018; FIFA List 2016–2018
- Ken Markham 1967–1969
- Andre Marriner 2003–2005; Premier League 2005–2023; FIFA List 2009–2017
- Brian Martin 1975–1982
- Geoff Martin 1964–1966
- John Martin 1978–1993: Premier League 1992–1993; FIFA list 1984–1988
- Steve Martin 2012–
- Cliff Maskell 1976–1982
- Sian Massey-Ellis 2009–
- Scott Mathieson 1994–2015
- Norman Matthews 1962–1966
- Bob Matthewson 1968–1977: FIFA list 1973–1977
- John McAuley 1984–1988
- George McCabe 1954–1969: FIFA list 1958–1969
- Danny McDermid 2006–2012
- Angus McDonald 1977–1979
- Kevin McNally 1972–1981
- Paul Melin 2004–2008
- Matt Messias 1997–2006; Premier League 2001–2006; FIFA list 2003–2005
- Neil Midgley 1977–1992: FIFA list 1982–1991
- Keith Miller 1984–1988
- Nigel Miller 2003–
- Patrick Miller 2005–2015
- Trelford Mills 1976–1990
- John (Jack) Mitchell 1954–1967
- Roger Milford1981–1994 Premier League 1992–1994
- Dean Mohareb 2011–2016
- Tony Morrissey 1968–1979
- Terry Morris 1976–1982
- Kelvin Morton 1986–1995: Premier League 1992–1995
- Jonathan Moss 2005–2022
- John Moules 1981–1993
- Gilbert Napthine 1978–1987
- Harry Nattrass 1933–1947
- Michael Naylor 2011–2016
- Harry New 1960–1975
- Bert Newsome 1973–1983
- Charles Nicholls 1966–1973
- Ricky Nicholson 1964–1972
- Derek Nippard 1967–1978
- Bob Nixon 1981–1993
- George Nolan 1974–1981
- Eric Norman 1961–1966
- Mike North 2000–2001
- Clive Oliver 2004–2011
- Michael Oliver 2007– : Premier League 2010–; FIFA list 2012–present
- Tony Oliver 1968–1974
- Ray Olivier 1998–2007
- David Orr 1993–1998
- John Osborne 1961–1970
- Derek Owen 1978–1984
- Norman Paget 1970–1973
- Reg Paine 1964–1970
- Tom Pallister 1966–1969
- Jim Parker 1987–1995
- Trevor Parkes 1999–2007
- Jack Parkinson 1959–1966
- Pat Partridge 1966–1981: FIFA list 1971–1981
- Roger Pawley 1988–1993
- Craig Pawson 2008–2013: FIFA list 2015–
- Donald Payne 1964–1968
- John Pearson 1908–1914
- Roy Pearson 1995–2004
- Mike Peck 1977–1995 Premier League 1992–1995
- Andy Penn 2002–2012
- John Penrose 1987–1989
- Clive Penton 2001–2009
- Bob Perkin 1971–1979
- David Phillips 1985–1992
- David Phillips 2008–2014
- Frank Phipps 1979–1980
- Jim Pickles 1949–1966
- Mick Pierce 1989–1999
- Mike Pike 1997–2008
- Graham Poll 1991–2007: Premier League 1993–2007; FIFA list 1996–2007
- Graham Pooley 1988–1997
- Alan Porter 1973–1981
- Bob Porthouse 1972–1974
- Richard Poulain 1991–1997
- Geoff Powell 1964–1966
- Harry Powell 1972–1975
- Reg Prichard 1965–1968
- D Pritchard 1965–1967
- Lee Probert 2003–2007 : Premier League 2007–2019; FIFA list 2010–2016
- Phil Prosser 2000–2007
- David Pugh 1996–2004: Premier League 2001–2003
- Dennis Pugh 1967–1972
- John Quinn 1968–1970
- Peter Quinn 2009–2012
- Bob Raby 1970–1974
- William Rawson 1876
- Eric Read 1974–1985
- Frederick Read 1946–1954
- Ken Redfern 1978–1993: Premier League 1992–1993
- Mike Reed 1985–2000: Premier League 1992–2000; FIFA list 1993–1997
- Darryl Reeves 1975–1989
- Peter Reeves 1972–1981: FIFA list 1978–1981
- Paul Rejer 1994–2003
- Uriah Rennie 1994–2009: Premier League 1997–2000, 2001–2009; FIFA list 2000–2004
- Gary Reynolds 1954–2004: Premier League 1997–2004; FIFA list 1972–82
- Peter Rhodes 1954–1967
- Jack Rice 1972–1977
- Harold Richards 1961–1968
- Phil Richards 1994–2002
- David Richardson 1972–1985: FIFA list 1979–85
- Derek Richardson 1975–1981
- Peter J. Richardson 1974–1982
- Ken Ridden 1974–1977
- Mike Riley 1994–2009: Premier League 1996–2009; FIFA list 1999–2009
- Alan Robinson 1973–1986: FIFA list 1983–1986
- Arthur Robinson 1981–1988
- Ivan Robinson 1966–1972
- Maurice Robinson 1979–1987
- Paul Robinson 1996–2007
- Reg Robinson 1974–1980
- Tim Robinson 2012–
- Geoff Roper 1961–1968
- Joe Ross 2001–2005
- Jim Rushton 1987–1996
- Steve Rushton 2009–2014
- Mick Russell 2004–
- Michael Ryan 1999–2006
- Graham Salisbury 2001–
- Michael Salisbury 2016–
- Ken Salmon 1974–1985
- Chris Sarginson 2008–
- Alan Saunders 1978–1986
- Edward Scales 1982–1986
- Paul Scoble 1991–1993
- David Scott 1980–1990
- Graham Scott 2008–2015; Premier League 2015–
- Mark Scott 1978–1987
- Ken Seddon 1959–1967
- Colin Seel 1973–1987
- Alan Seville 1978–1991
- Jeff Sewell 1975–1980
- David Shadwell 1991–1993
- Lester Shapter 1974–1992
- Don Shaw 1976–1988
- Darren Sheldrake 2009–2016
- Ray Shepherd 1990–1994
- Rob Shoebridge 2006–2014
- Alan Simmons 1988–1991
- Jeremy Simpson 2012–
- Trevor Simpson 1984–1991
- Malcolm Sinclair 1966–1979
- Gurnam Singh 1989–1999
- Jarnail Singh 2004–2010
- George Singleton 1967–1969
- Arthur Smith 1989–1994
- David Smith 1959–1974: FIFA list 1968–1974
- Dennis Smith 1976–1978
- Ivan Smith 1970–1976
- Jeff Smith 1991–1992
- Arthur Sparling 1957–1966
- Trevor Spencer 1971–1985
- Rex Spittle 1962–1970
- Brian Stevens 1975–1991
- Seb Stockbridge 2013–
- Ken Stokes 1956–1967
- Frazer Stretton 1995–2004
- Keith Stroud 2004–2007 : Premier League 2007–2010
- Howard Victor Aldridge Stott 1956–1959
- Keith Styles 1967–1979
- Rob Styles 1996–2009: Premier League 2000–2009; FIFA list 2002–2009
- Gary Sutton 2005–2007, 2009–
- Lee Swabey 2015–
- Kenneth Sweet 1970–1973
- Steve Tanner 2003–2013: Premier League 2007–; FIFA list 2008–2009
- Anthony Taylor 2006–2010: Premier League 2010–; FIFA list 2013–present
- Howard Taylor 1980–1989
- Jack Taylor 1958–1977: FIFA list 1963–1977
- Mike Taylor 1973–1984
- Paul Taylor 1990–1993, 1995–2010
- John Thacker 1962–1973
- Mike Thorpe 2002–2010
- Paul Tierney 2009–2015; Premier League 2015–; FIFA list 2018–2022
- Ray Tinkler 1961–1976
- Joe Timmons 1987–1989
- Steve Tomlin 1999–2005
- Ben Toner 2015–
- Ray Toseland 1971–1981
- Gordon Trevett 1973–1976
- Colin Trussell 1985–1993
- Dennis Turner 1968–1979
- Alan Turvey 1973–1978
- Peter Tyldesley 1979–1991
- George Tyson 1978–1990
- Paul Vanes 1984–1995
- Danny Vickers 1979–1990
- Paul Vosper assistant referee 1987–2003 : Premier League 1992–2003; FIFA List 1995–2001
- Keith Walker 1961–1973: FIFA list 1970–1973
- Dave Wallace 1964–1976
- Peter Walters 1965–1976
- Peter Walton 1998–2012
- Ken Walmsley 1974–1988
- Jim Warburton 1966–1968
- Gavin Ward 2007–
- Tony Ward 1980–1993: Premier League 1993
- Mike Warner 1979–1981
- Mark Warren 1998–2005
- Maurice Washer 1970–1972
- John Watson 1986–1995
- Jock Waugh 2009–2014
- David Webb 2008–
- Derek Webb (Sale) 1978–1982
- Graham Horwood 2007–2011
- Howard Webb 2000–2014: Premier League 2003–2014; FIFA list 2005–2014
- Colin Webster 2000–2012
- Rebecca Welch 2015–
- Alan R C Weller 1964–1967
- David F C Wells 1964–1967
- Trevor West 1988–1997
- Jim Whalley 1972–1974
- Clive White 1973–1983: FIFA list 1977–1982
- Dean Whitestone 2006–
- Alan Wiley 1995–2010: Premier League 1999–2010
- Clive Wilkes 1990–2003: Premier League 2001–2003
- Alan Wilkie 1988–2000: Premier League 1993–2000
- Gary Willard 1990–2000: Premier League 1994–2000; FIFA list 1996–1999
- Harold Williams 1966–1975
- John Williams 1971–1976
- Iain Williamson 2002–2016
- Peter Willis 1972–1986
- Harry Wilson 1961–1966
- Norman Wilson 1981–1986
- Dick Windle 1954–1967
- Jeff Winter 1992–2004: Premier League 1995–2004
- Roger Wiseman 1986–1994
- Eddie Wolstenholme 1992–2003: Premier League 2001–2003
- Andy Woolmer 2004–
- Joe Worrall 1976–1995: Premier League 1992–1995; FIFA list 1981–1992
- Jack Wrennall 1971–1979
- Kevin Wright 2003–
- Philip (Pip) Wright 1986–1995
- Ken Wynn 1966–1973
- John Yates 1966–1977
- Ollie Yates 2016–

== Equatorial Guinea ==
- Joaquín Esono (2013–)
- Expedito Moro (2005–)
- Acacio Nguema Mibuy (2005–)
- Juan Nsi Mbemgono (2011–)
- Diosdado Nzibi (2011–)
- Antonio Ondo (1994–)
- Juliana Mibuy Onva Okomo (2012–)
- David Ndong Esono Mokuy (2015–)

== Eritrea ==
- Berhane Dangew (2004–)
- Amanuel Eyob (2004–)
- Luelseghed Ghebremichael (2004–)
- Idris Mehammed Osman (2015–)
- Yonas Zekarias Ghebre (2016–)
- Tsegay Mogos Teklu (2018–)
- Yemane Asfaha Gebremedhin (2013–)

== Estonia ==
- Juri Frischer (2016–)
- Joonas Jaanovits (2021–)
- Hannes Kaasik (2006–2013)
- Sten Kaldma (1998–2009)
- Eiko Saar (2011–2016)
- Roomer Tarajev (2015–2021)
- Kristo Tohver (2010–)

== Eswatini ==
=== Women's football ===
- Letticia Viana (2015–present)

=== Futsal referee ===
- Gilbert Dlamini (2002–)
- Mbongseni Fakudze (2002–)
- Simanga Nhleko (2002–)
- Thulani Sibandze (2012–)

== Ethiopia ==
- Haileyesus Bazezew (2012–)
- Siamregn Dagne (2004–)
- Zekarias Girma Fega (2005–)
- Lemma Nigussie (2014–)
- Tsige Sisay (2005–)
- Belay Tadesse (2014–)
- Ledya Tafesse (2005–)
- Kine Tibebu
- Bamlak Tessema Weyesa (2009–)
- Tewodros Mitiku (2018–)
- Dawit Asamenew (2018–)

kinde Tesema (2000–2005)

== Faroe Islands ==
- Petur Reinert (2007–2017)
- Alex Troleis (2015–2022)

== Fiji ==
- Andrew Anand Achari(2005–)
- Ravitesh Behari (2013–)
- Salesh Chand (2008–)
- Rakesh Varman (2000–)
- Finau Vulivuli (2008–)

== Finland ==
- Dennis Antamo (2012–2017)
- Tony Asumaa (2003–2012)
- Mattias Gestranius (2009–2021)
- Kirsi Heikkinen (2005–2013)
- Jouni Hietala (2005–2008)
- Martti Hirviniemi (1958–1980)
- Jouni Hyytiä (1997–2009)
- Jari Järvinen (2012–2018)
- Petteri Kari (1999–2011)
- Georg Krutelew (1970–1978)
- Ifeoma Kulmala (2014–)
- Lina Lehtovaara (2009–)
- Antti Munukka (2010–2023)
- Tero Nieminen (2008–2011)
- Markku Paunonen (1996–?)
- Mikko Vuorela (1995–2007)
- Ville Nevalainen (2014–2018)
- Mohammad Al-Emara (2017–present)
- Peiman Simani (2023–present)
- Joni Hyytiä (2017–present)
- Oliver Reitala (2018–present)
- Minka Vekkeli
- Lotta Vuorio

== France ==
- Benoît Bastien (2014–present)
- Marc Batta (1990–1998)
- Wilfrid Bien
- Gérard Biguet (1982–1992)
- Sabine Bonnin (2007–)
- Stéphane Bré (1998–2008)
- Ruddy Buquet (2011–present)
- Georges Capdeville
- Alexandre Castro
- Tony Chapron (2007–2017)
- Bruno Coué
- Willy Delajod
- Laurent Duhamel (1999–)
- Saïd Ennjimi (2008–)
- Didier Falcone
- Fredy Fautrel (2007–)
- Stephanie Frappart (2009–)
- Antony Gautier (2010–)
- Maurice Guigue
- Christian Guillard
- Florence Guillemin (2005–)
- J.Hamel
- Rémi Harrel
- Lionel Jaffredo (2008–present)
- Philippe Kalt (1998–2009)
- Stéphane Lannoy (2006–2014)
- Bertrand Layec (2002–2009)
- Damien Ledentu (2005–2009)
- François Letexier (2017–present)
- M.Lesage
- Philippe Malige
- Benoît Millot (2014–present)
- Sébastien Moreira
- Hervé Piccirillo (2005–2008)
- Jeremie Pignard (2018–present)
- Éric Poulat (1999–2006)
- Joël Quiniou (1980–1994)
- Mehdi Rahmouni (2018–present) (Note: Rahmouni began his career as a central referee and then opted for being an assistant referee)
- Nicolas Rainville (2013–present)
- Alain Sars (1993–2006)
- Frank Schneider (2016–)
- Marcel Slawick
- Olivier Thual (2007–)
- Clément Turpin (2010–)
- Michel Vautrot (1975–1990)
- Gilles Veissière (1992–2004)
- Nelly Viennot
- Pascal Vileo
- Robert Wurtz (1970–1987)
- Severine Zinck (2009–)

== Gabon ==
- Jean-Fidele Daramba
- Christian Mouity (2009–)
- Pierre Mounguegui
- Gil Ndume (2004–)
- Patricia Obone Obiang (2008–)
- Eric Otogo-Castane (2011–)
- Yves Roponat (2008–)
- Beranger Woungui (2013–)
- Kossi Azaleko (2013–)
- Gauthier Marc Mihindou Mbina (2015–)
- Fabrice Nguembi Boulingui (2017–)
- Isidore Essono Nze (2016–)
- Pierre Atcho (2018–)

== Gambia ==
- Bakary Camara (2011–)
- Bakary Papa Gassama (2007–)
- Maudo Jallow (2009–)
- Ansu Jatta (2005–)
- Sheriff Njie (2013–)
- Omar Sallah (2013–)

== Georgia ==
- Tornike Gvantseladze (2013–)
- Levan Paniashvili (2000–)
- Lashuna Silagava (2005–)
- George Vadachkoria (2007–)

== Germany ==
- Deniz Aytekin (2011–2022)
- Christine Baitinger (2004–2013)
- Felix Brych (2007–2021)
- Bastian Dankert (2014–present)
- Christian Dingert (2013–present)
- Herbert Fandel (1998–2009)
- Marco Fritz (2012–2021)
- Manuel Gräfe (2007–2018)
- Bernd Heynemann (1988–1999)
- Riem Hussein (2009–present)
- Thorsten Kinhöfer (2006–2013)
- Knut Kircher (2004–2012)
- Hellmut Krug (1991–2001)
- Marija Kurtes (2013–2015)
- Markus Merk (1992–2008)
- Florian Meyer (2002–2013)
- Harm Osmers (2020–present)
- Adolf Prokop (1972–1988)
- Babak Rafati (2008–2011)
- Daniel Siebert (2015–)
- Peter Sippel (2003–2011)
- Wolfgang Stark (1999–2014)
- Sacha Stegemann (2019–present)
- Bibiana Steinhaus (2005–2020)
- Tobias Stieler (2014–present)
- Karl-Heinz Tritschler (1983–1991)
- Franz-Xaver Wack (2000–2007)
- Michael Weiner (2002–2012)
- Tobias Welz (2013–2019)
- Felix Zwayer (2012–present)
- Sven Jablonski (2022-present)

== Ghana ==
- Prosper Adii (2014–)
- William Agbovi (2004–)
- Delight Alorbu (2012–)
- Joyce Obenewa Appiah (2014–)
- Benjamin Dwomoh
- Hamidu Bomison (2007–)
- Theresa Bremansu (2013–)
- Cecil Fleischer (2008–)
- Joseph Lamptey (2005–2017)
- Daniel Laryea (2014–)
- Reginald Lathbridge (2006–)
- George Lantei Lamptey (Major) (1955–1974; FIFA List: 1963–1974)
- Christine Enyonam Ziga (2010–)

== Greece ==
- Eleni Antoniou (2014–)
- Anastasios Kakos (2008–2014)
- Charalampos Kalogeropoulos (2015–)
- Dimitrios Kalopoulos (2008–)
- Michael Koukoulakis (2008–2015)
- Eleni Lampadariou (2010–)
- Efthalia Mitsi (2005–)
- Anastasios Sidiropoulos (2011–present)
- Ilias Spathas (2010–2015)
- Stavros Tritsonis (2010–2015)
- Kyros Vassaras (1998–2009)
- Christoforos Zografos (2004–2008)
- Anastasios Papapetrou (2016–present)
- Emmanouil Skoulas (2019–2021)
- Vasilios Fotias (2022–present)
- Antonios Adamopoulos (Futsal) (2017–present)

== Grenada ==
- Valman Bedeau (1997–?)
- George Phillip (1999–?)
- Reon Radix (2018–present)

== Guatemala ==
- Carlos Batres (2010–2010)
- Fredy Burgos Escobar
- Mario Escobar (2013–present)
- Lesbia Aracely Garcia (2013–present)
- Juan Guerra (2007–)
- Walter López (2006–present)
- Rómulo Méndez (1971–1986)
- Jonathan Polanco (2013–present)
- Elmar Rodas (2005–)
- Oscar Reyna (2010–present)
- Bryan López (2017–present)
- Sergio Reyna (2017–present)

== Guinea ==
- Aboubacar Bangoura (2004–)
- Ousmane Camara (2013–)
- Aissatou Inter Keita (2004–)
- Yakhouba Keita (2004–)
- Baba Leno (2013–)
- Therese Sagno (2003–)
- Jose Luis Urena Ramos (1981–1983)
- Sékou Ahmed Touré (2005–)
- Bangaly Konaté (2018–)
- Younoussa Tawel Camara (2018–)

== Guinea-Bissau ==
- Gilberto dos Santos (2012–)
- Ross Leopoldina Dayves (2004–)
- Fidel Gomes (2005–)
- João Soares da Gama (2005–)

== Guyana ==
- Charles Stephen Oswald Daniels
- Winston Duff (1998–2004)
- Otis James (1999–)
- Sherwin Johnson (2012–)
- Nicola Joseph (2010–)
- Stanley Anthony Lancaster (2004–)
- Roy McArthur (2002–)
- Sherwin Moore (2013–)
- Maurees Skeete (2014–)
- Gladwyn Johnson (2017–)

== Haiti ==
- Judith Ambroise (2014–)
- David Edren (2007–)
- Alain Georges (2010–)
- Rosnick Grant (1993–)
- Edouard Guidner (2007–)
- Allan Jacques (2012–)
- Walner Laventure (2011–)
- Joanne Monestime (2014–)
- Adzer Ariznat (2015–)
- Jacques Robert Arthur (2017–)
- Patrick Senecharles (2018–)
- Carl-Henry Elie (2018–)
- Benbito Celima (2018–)

== Honduras ==
- Rafael Quiroz Martel(1959–1972)
- Erick Rigoberto Andino Medina (2011–2014)
- Melissa Paola Borjas Pastrana (2013–)
- Armando Castro (2011–present)
- Raúl Castro (2011–present)
- Melvin Matamoros (2014–present)
- Rodolfo Martínez Mejía
- José Molina (2008–)
- Óscar Moncada (2008–)
- Marlon Muñoz (2008–)
- José Pineda (1999–)
- Hector Rodríguez (2011–2019)
- Ricardo Zelaya (2004–)
- Héctor Said Martínez (2017–)

== Hong Kong ==
- Thomson Chan (HKFA: 1969–1990; FIFA list: 1975–1990)
- Ho Wai Sing (2011–)
- Ng Chiu Kok (2007–)
- Ng Kai Lam (2004–)
- Law Bik Chi (2013–)
- Liu Kwok Man (2008–)
- Chiu Kok Ng (2004–)
- Tong Kui Sum (2008–)
- Charlton Wong (2006–2010)
- Lau Fong Hei (2015–)
- Tam Ping Wun (2019–)
- Wong Wai Lun (2020–)

== Hungary ==
- Sándor Andó-Szabó (2008–)
- Ferenc Bede (1998–2007)
- Tamás Bognár (2009–present)
- Gyöngyi Krisztina Gaál (2002–)
- Viktor Kassai (2003–2019)
- Katalin Anna Kulcsár (2004–)
- Adam Farkas (2015–)
- Lajos Németh (1983–1991)
- Karoly Palotai + 2018
- Sándor Puhl (1988–2000)
- Zsolt Szabó (1999–2013)
- Eszter Urbán (2010–present)
- István Vad (2007–)
- László Vágner (1991–1998)

== Iceland ==
- Þorvaldur Árnason (2010–2024)
- Þóroddur Hjaltalín (2010–)
- Gunnar Jarl Jónsson (2012–)
- Garðar Örn Hinriksson (2005–2009)
- Kristinn Jakobsson (1997–)
- Jóhannes Valgeirsson (2004–2011)
- Bríet Bragadóttir (2018-present)
- Helgi Mikael Jónasson (2019-present)
- Jóhann Ingi Jónsson (2025-present)
- Ívar Orri Kristjánsson (2018-present)
- Vilhjálmur Alvar Þórarinsson (2015-present)

=== Assistant referees ===
- Gylfi Már Sigurðsson (2011–present)
- Rúna Stefánsdóttir (2012-present)
- Birkir Sigurðarson (2012-present)
- Egill Guðvarður Guðlaugsson (2020-present)
- Eysteinn Hrafnkelsson (2023-present)
- Kristján Már Ólafs (2023-present)
- Ragnar Þór Bender (2024-present)
- Guðmundur Ingi Bjarnason (2026-pesent)

== India ==
- Tony Joseph Louis (2016–)
- Provat Arun Som (1964–1967)
- Mamukoya Asarikandy (1990–1995)
- Maria Piedade Rebello (2007–?)
- Ikram Ul Haq (?–?)
- Ranadhir Sow (1992–1999)
- Praveer Bose (1999–?)
- Suresh Srinivasan (1999–?)
- Rizwan Ul-Haq (2000)
- Pratap Singh Patwal (2009–?)
- Arjunan Gowder (2005–?)
- Santhosh Kumar (2011–2021)
- Rahul Das (2014–?)
- Pranjal Banerjee (2014–)
- Tejas Nagvenkar (2014–)
- C. R. Srikrishna (2010–)
- Rowan Arumughan (2009–)
- Crystal John (2021–)
- Venkatesh Ramachandran (2021–)

== Indonesia ==
=== Current Referees ===
==== Men's ====
===== Referees =====
- Thoriq Munir Alkatiri (2014–)
- Yudi Nurcahya (2018–)
- Ryan Nanda Saputra (2024–)
- Naufal Adya Fairuski (2025–)

===== Assistant Referees =====
- Bangbang Syamsudar (2013–)
- Beni Andriko (2014–)
- Nurhadi Sulchan (2014–)
- I Gede Selamet Raharja (2019–)
- Azizul Alimmudin Hanafiah (2020–)
- Fajar Furqon (2020–)
- Muhammad Akbar Jamaluddin (2022–)
- Gilang Ade Mizwar (2026–)

===== Video Match Officials =====
- Thoriq Munir Alkatiri (2026–)
- Naufal Adya Fairuski (2026–)

===== Futsal Referees =====
- Wahyu Wicaksono (2018–)
- Fitra Fauzi Rahmat (2024–)

==== Women's ====
===== Assistant Referees =====
- Wina Apriliana Putri (2025–)

===== Futsal Referees =====
- Tita Rosita (2025–)

== Iran ==
- Jafar Namdar (1970–1978)
- Mohammadreza Faghani (2017–)
- Mohammad Reza Akbarian (2013–)
- Hasan Akrami (2013–present)
- Mooud Bonyadifar (2013–present)
- Mohammad Fanaei (1990–2000)
- Bijan Heidari (2015–)
- Payam Heidari (2015–)
- Jamileh Keshavarz (2014–)
- Ashkan Khorshidi (2013–present)
- Hedayat Mombini (2003–2010)
- Masoud Moradi (2000–2010)
- Saltanat Norouzi (2010–)
- Saeid Mozaffari Zadeh Yazdi (2007–)
- Mohsen Torky (2003–2017)
- Shiva Yari (2010–)
- Vahid Kazemi (2018–)
- Mahsa Ghorbani (2017–)
- Mahnaz Zokaee (2018–)
- Saltanat Norouzi (2010–)

== Iraq ==
- Ala Abdul (1997–)
- Sabah Abid (2003–)
- Ali Sabah Adday Al-Qaysi (2009–)
- Samir Akool (2004–)
- Wathik Al-Baag (2012–)
- Haitham Mohammed Ali (2009–)
- Fahmi Al-Qaimaqchi (1948–1966)
- Kadhum Auda Lazim (2003–)
- Falah Abid Saad (2009–)
- Mohanad Qasim Eesee Sarray (2011–)
- Zaid Thamer Mohammed (2016–)
- Ahmed Sabah Qasim Albaghdadi (2019–)

== Ireland ==
- Anthony Buttimer
- Damien Hancock
- Alan Kelly (2002–present)
- Damien MacGraith
- David McKeon (2004–)
- Paul McLaughlin (2013–present)
- Rob Harvey (2010–)
- Rob Rogers (2012–present)
- Ian Stokes (2004–2011)
- Stuart Templeman (2009–2011)
- Paula Brady (2015–present)
- Darren O’Hagan (2003–present)

== Israel ==
- Lilach Asulin (2008–)
- Sapir Berman
- Yigal Frid (2018–)
- Abraham Klein
- Orel Grinfeld (2012–)
- Eli Hacmon (2010–)
- Asaf Kenan (2003–)
- Meir Levi (2000–)
- Liran Liany (2010–2022)
- Menashe Masihah (2009–)
- Roi Reinshreiber (2014–2024)
- Eitan Shemeulevitch (2012–2023)
- Alon Yefet (2001–)

== Italy ==
- Luigi Agnolin (1978–1992)
- Fabio Baldas (1986–1994)
- Luca Banti (2009–2018)
- Paolo Bergamo (1979–1988)
- Paolo Casarin (1978–1988)
- Piero Ceccarini (1992–1999)
- Pierluigi Collina (1995–2005)
- Antonio Damato (2010–2016)
- Andrea De Marco (2007–2013)
- Massimo De Santis (2000–2006)
- Paolo Dondarini (2005–2009)
- Stefano Farina (2001–2007)
- Valentina Garoffolo (2014–)
- Sergio Gonella (1972–1978)
- Marco Guida (2014–present)
- Massimiliano Irrati (2017–present)
- Tullio Lanese (1985–1992)
- Concetto Lo Bello (1958–1974)
- Rosario Lo Bello (1983–1992)
- Luciano Luci (1985–1994)
- Maurizio Mariani (2019–present)
- Davide Massa (2014–present)
- Paolo Mazzoleni (2011–2018)
- Domenico Messina (1998–2007)
- Daniele Orsato (2010–2024)
- Pierluigi Pairetto (1989–1998)
- Graziella Pirriatore (2013–2021)
- Nicola Rizzoli (2007–2017)
- Gianluca Rocchi (2008–2020)
- Roberto Rosetti (2002–2010)
- Silvia Tea Spinelli (2003–)
- Paolo Tagliavento (2007–2017)
- Matteo Trefoloni (2004–2010)
- Paolo Valeri (2011–2021)
- Carina Susana Vitulano (2005–)
- Martina Molinaro (2022–present)
- Silvia Gasperotti (2022–present)
- Deborah Bianchi (2022–present)

== Jamaica ==
- Courtney Campbell (2004–2013)
- Kevin Morrison (2008–)
- Peter Prendergast
- Kevin Thomas (2008–)
- Dwight Royal (2012–present)
- Valdin Legister (2010–present)
- Karl Tyrell (2015–present)
- Veralton Nembhard (2015–present)
- Daneon Parchment (2017–present)
- Oshane Nation (2018–present)

== Japan ==
- Toru Kamikawa (1998–2007)
- Hiroki Kasahara (2020–present)
- Hiroyuki Kimura (2014–present)
- Hajime Matsuo (2005–)
- Yuichi Nishimura (2004–2014)
- Kenji Ogiya (2007–)
- Takuto Okabe (2015–)
- Masayoshi Okada (1993–2003)
- Toshikazu Sano
- Shizuo Takada (1984–1994)
- Hiroyoshi Takayama (2004–2013)
- Minoru Tōjō (2007–)
- Masaaki Toma (2005–2016)
- Yudai Yamamoto (2011–present)
- Jumpei Iida (2011–present)
- Ryuji Sato (2009–present)
- Yusuke Araki (2017–present)
- Yoshimi Yamashita (2015–present)

== Jordan ==
- Ahmad Yacoub Ibrahim (2014–present)
- Mohammad Abu Loum (2005–)
- Adham Makhadmeh (2013–present)
- Mohammad Arafah (2012– present)
- Ahmed Al-Ali (2015–present)
- Murad Zawahreh
- Ismael Alhafi (2000–2008)
- Naser Alghafari (2003–2012)

== Kazakhstan ==
- Pavel Saliy (2003–)
- Artyom Kuchin(2009–)

== Kenya ==
- Alfred Ndinya (1999–)
- Mpaiwa Israel (2014–)
- Sylvester Kirwa (2009–)
- Davies Omweno (2010–)
- Anthony Ogwayo (2012–)
- Israel Mpaima (2014–)
- Andrew Otieno (2014–)
- Peter Waweru (2017–)

== Korea DPR ==
- Hwang Thae Ho (2004–)
- Kang In Chol (2006–)
- O Thae Song (2003–)
- Choe Kwang-hyon (2015–)

== Korea Republic ==
- Choi Myung-yong (2007–2012)
- Kim Dong-jin (2005–)
- Kim Eui Soo (2007–)
- Kim Jong-hyeok (2009–present)
- Kim Sang-woo (2008–2017)
- Young-Joo Kim
- Ko Hyung-jin (2009–present)
- Lee Min-hu (2005–)
- Kim Dae-yong (2012–present)
- Kim Hee-gon (2013–present)
- Kim Woo-sung (2016–present)
- Chae Sang-hyeop (2018–present)

== Kosovo ==
- Visar Kastrati (2020–present)
- Genc Nuza (2017–present)
- Mervan Bejtullahu (2023–present)
- Rita Vehapi (2023–present)
- Besfort Kasumi (2018–2022)

== Kuwait ==
- Ahmad Al-Ali (2016–present)
- Jasem Ahmad (2014–present)
- Atallah Jatli Al Enezi (2005–)
- Naser Al Enezi (2001–)
- Mahammad Al Shemmari (1998–)
- Saad Mane (1994–2008)
- Ali Shaban (2009–)
- Yousef Al-Marzouq (2009–)

== Kyrgyzstan ==
=== Current referees ===
==== Men's ====
===== Referees =====
- Daiyrbek Abdyldayev (2019–)
- Zainiddin Alimov (2021–)
- Nurzatbek Askat Uulu (2021–)
- Denis Shalayev (2020–)
- Mederbek Taichiyev (2021–)

===== Assistant referees =====
- Zamir Chynybekov (2010–)
- Khusan Dhzaladnikov (2018–)
- Sergey Grishchenko (2009–)
- Kanat Myrsabekov (2020–)
- Eldiyar Salybayev (2015–)
- Artyom Skopintsev (2009–)
- Ismailzhan Talipzhanov (2014–)

===== Futsal referees =====
- Nurdin Bukuyev (2006–)
- Eldiyar Keldibekov (2018–)
- Chyngyz Mustafayev (2016–)

==== Women's ====
===== Referees =====
- Veronika Bernatskaya (2018–)

===== Assistant referees =====
- Ramina Tsoi (2018–)

=== Former ===
- Emil Busurmankulov (2003–2007)
- Timur Faizullin (2009–2020)
- Dmitry Mashentsev (2004–2020)
- Kiemiddin Piriev (2016–2020)
- Muzaffar Abdullaev (2005–2009)
- Rysbek Shekerbekov (2011–2018)

== Laos ==
=== Current referees ===
==== Men's ====
===== Referees =====
- Xaypaseth Phongsanit (2007–)
- Souei Vongkham (2015–)
- Khamsing Xaiyavongsy (2015–)

===== Assistant referees =====
- Boun Oum Ladsavong (2019–)
- Kilar Ladsavong (2015–)
- Somphavanh Louang (2008–)
- Bounphan Sissouvanh (2018–)
- Phonesooksin Teso (2012–)

===== Futsal referees =====
- Khampasong Xayavongsy (2014–)

==== Women's ====
===== Referees =====
- Khamsing Xaiyanvongsy (2021–)

===== Assistant referees =====
- Phutsavan Chanthavong (2019–)

=== Former ===
- Sipaseuth Sinbandith (2005–2011)
- Visith Sengamphanh (2013–)

== Latvia ==
- Romāns Lajuks (1993–2008)
- Eduards Bigats (1993–1994)
- Sergejs Braga (1996–1999)
- Andrejs Sipailo (2000–2011)
- Vadims Direktorenko (2009–2015)
- Andris Treimanis (2011–)
- Aleksandrs Anufrijevs (2012–2022)
- Aleksandrs Golubevs (2016–2020)
- Vitālijs Spasjonņikovs (2021–)
- Edgars Maļcevs (2023–)
- Kristaps Ratnieks (2026–)

== Lebanon ==
As of 22 July 2020

- Hussein Abo Yehia (2013–present)
- Sheikh Ahmad Alaeddin (2020–present)
- Maher Al Ali (2018–present)
- Doumouh Al Bakkar (2016–present)
- Mohamad Darwich (2013–present)
- Sarkis Demirdjian (1962–1983)
- Radwan Ghandour (2003–????)
- Sabeh Falah (1979)
- Andre El Haddad (2007–2013)
- Youssef Hamdar (1979)
- Hagop Karageuzian (1979)
- Mohamad Issa (2019–present)
- Ahmad Jassem (2014–????)
- Mohammad Mansour (2000–????)
- Tallat Najm (1994–2012)
- Ali Reda (2013–present)
- Ali Sabbagh (2008–2013)
- Avedis Torossian (1979)

== Lesotho ==
- Maponyane Daniel Letsie (2004–)
- Moeti Mpopo (2001–)
- Paul Phomane (1999–)
- Sentso Mohau (2000–)
- Mapoho Mapoho (2010–)
- Tsoeu Thabo (2010–)
- Tankiso Maseru (2010–)
- Kotoa Khosola (2010–)
- Osiase Koto (2010–)
- Lebalang Martin Mokete (2016–)

== Liberia ==
- Isaac Montgomery (2013–)
- Jerry Yekeh (2009–)
- George Rogers (2016–)

== Libya ==
- Jamel Ambaya (2001–)
- Yousef Alghoul
- Wahid Tamuni (1999–)
- Muhammad Azzalook (2009–)
- Abdallah Baesus Ashraf (2013–)
- Mohamed Ragab Omar (2008–)
- Esam Al Jahani (2016–)
- Ayman El Sharif (2016–)
- Abdulwahid Huraywidah (2018–)
- Abdalla Mohamed ali (1994–2007)

== Liechtenstein ==
- Roland Beck (1995–2003)

== Lithuania ==
- Paulius Malžinskas (2001–2009)
- Gediminas Mažeika (2008–)
- Audrius Žuta (2005–2008)
- Ingrida Siliūnienė

== Luxembourg ==
- Sven Bindels (2011–present)
- Alain Hamer (1993–2010)
- Abby Toussaint (2005–)
- Luc Wilmes (2002–)

== Macau ==
- Wong Kuan Lon (1998–2012)

== North Macedonia ==
- Dejan Jakimovski (2013–)
- Dimitar Meckarovski (2008–)
- Ivana Projkovska (2012–)
- Aleksandar Stavrev (2006–)
- Irena Velevackoska (2014–)
- Goran Spirkovski

== Madagascar ==
- Hubert Andriamiharisoa (2006–)
- Floriant Raolimanana (2000–)
- Hamada Nampiandraza (2010–)
- Andofetra Rakotojaona (2014–)
- Abdoul Kanoso (2009–)
- Ibrahim Ben Tsimanohitsy (2018–)

== Malawi ==
- Bester Kalombo (1976–1992)
- Patrick Kapanga (2003–)
- Verson Lwanja (2001–)
- Kalyoto Ngosi (2003–)
- Duncan Lengani (2010–)
- Dennis Nguluwe (2010–)
- Ishmael Chizinga (2017–)
- Patrick Ngoleka (2015–)
- Alfred Mbuto Chilinda (2018–)

== Malaysia ==
- Mohd Nafeez Abdul Wahab (2008–)
- Letchmanasamy Kathirveloo
- Danny Kim Heng (2003–)
- Subkhiddin Mohd Salleh (2000–2011)
- Krishnan Ramachandran (2001–)
- Rosdi Shaharul (2004–)
- Mohd Amirul Izwan Bin Yaacob (2012–present)
- Nagor Amir Noor Mohamed (2011–)
- Suhaizi Shukri (2011–)
- Muhammad Nazmi Nasaruddin (2016–)
- Razlan Joffri Ali (2018–)

== Maldives ==
- Adam Fazeel (2016–)
- Mohamed Javiz (2016–)
- Hussain Sinan (2020–)

== Mali ==
- Koman Coulibaly (1999–)
- Ousmane Karembe (2005–)
- Sidi Bekaye Magassa
- Boubacar Sidibé (2009–)
- Ousmane Sidibé (2006–)
- Boubou Traoré (2013–)
- Mahamadou Keita (2009–)
- Harouna Coulibaly (2014–)
- Gaoussou Kané (2017–)

== Malta ==
- Marco Borg (2008–)
- Chris Lautier (2005–)
- Anton Zammit (1995–)
- Farrugia Cann T.
- Joseph Attard (1999–2010)

== Mauritania ==
- Ali Lemghaifry (2005–)
- Mohamed Bourge (2002–)
- Mohamed Hamada (2008–)
- Mohamed Ould Lemghambodj (1998–)
- Abderahmane Kelly (2012–)
- Babacar Sarr (2016–)
- Mohamed Cheikh Mhamed Vall (2017–)
- Dahane Beida (2018–)
- Mathioro Diabel (2017–)

== Mauritius ==
- Edwin Picon-Ackong
- Lim Kee Chong
- Seethiah Ram (2005–)
- Dharmanand Roopnah (2002–)
- Rajindraparsad Seechurn (2004–2015)
- Dharamveer Hurbungs (2012–)
- Parmendra Nunkoo (2008–)
- Ahmad Imtehaz Heeralall (2016–)
- Ganesh Chutooree (2010–)

== Mexico ==
- Benito Archundia (1993–2010)
- Germán Arredondo (2001–2010)
- Arturo Brizio Carter (1987–2000)
- Jorge Rojas (2013–2017)
- Edgardo Codesal (1983–1990)
- Paul Delgadillo (2008–2017)
- Hugo León Guajardo (2004–2010)
- Erick Miranda (2016–present)
- Quetzalli Alvarado Godinez (2004–present)
- Mauricio Morales (2004–2012)
- Antonio Márquez Ramírez (1978–1986)
- Marco Rodríguez (1999–2014)
- Roberto García Orozco (2007–2019)
- Francisco Chacón (2009–2017)
- Ricardo Arellano (2010–2013)
- José Alfredo Peñaloza (2010–2017)
- Jorge Pérez Durán (2014–present)
- Jorge Eduardo Gasso Flores (2011–2012)
- Fernando Hernández (2018–)
- Fernando Guerrero (2014–present)
- César Arturo Ramos (2014–present)
- Oscar Macías (2015–present)
- Luis Santander (2015–present)
- Marco Antonio Ortiz (2018–present)
- Francia Gonzalez (2013–present)
- Diego Montaño (2019–present)
- Adonai Escobedo (2019–present)

== Moldova ==
- Veaceslav Banari (2002–)
- Igor Satchi (2007–)
- Ghennadi Sidenco (2006–)
- Dumitru Muntean (2013–)
- Alexandru Tean (2014–)
- Ion Orlic (2021–)
- Roman Jitari (2023–)

== Montenegro ==
- Jovan Kaludjerović (2008–)
- Pavle Radovanović (2008–)
- Miodrag Raduloviс (2001–2010)

== Morocco ==
- Said Belqola (1993–2001)
- Abdellah El Achiri (2000–)
- Bouchaïb El Ahrach (2008–)
- Khalid Ennouni (2008–)
- Mohamed Guezzaz (1997–2007)
- Khalid Ramsis (2008–)
- Khalil Rouaissi (2002–)
- Said Tahri (2001–)
- Hicham Tiazi (2010–)
- Noureddine El Jaafari (2013–)
- Redouane Jiyed (2009–)
- Samir Guezzaz (2016–)
- Adil Zourak (2015–)
- Karim Sabry (2018–)
- Jalal Jayed (2019–)

== Mozambique ==
- Justino Faduco (1999–)
- Mateus Infante (1996–)
- Antonio Massango (1996–)
- Aníbal António (2012–)
- Samuel Chirindza (2010–)
- José Rachide (2008–)
- Zefanias Chijamela (2015–)
- Celso Alvação (2017–)
- Simões Guambe (2017–)

== Myanmar ==
- U Win Cho (2004–)
- U Hla Tint (2004–)
- U THANT ZIN OO (1983)

== Namibia ==
- Arvo Mufeti (2003–)
- Alex Simataa Tiyeho (2006–)
- Jackson kamboando(2011–)
- Leston Nangombe (2015–)
- Jackson Pavaza (2015–)
- Jonas Shongedi (2013–)
- Nehemia Shifeleni Shoovaleka (2018–)

== Nepal ==
- Dilip Rajak (1999–PRESENT)
- Gyanu Shrestha (1993–)
- Surendra Sikhrakar (1997–)
- Harish Karki (2024–)

== Netherlands ==
- John Blankenstein (1985–1995)
- Kevin Blom (2005–)
- Ruud Bossen (2001–2007)
- Eric Braamhaar (2002–2011)
- Charles Corver (1972–1983)
- Rob Dieperink (2022–2026)
- Ben Haverkort (2002–2006)
- Leo Horn (1933–1966)
- Jack van Hulten
- Dick Jol (1993–2001)
- Jan Keizer (1972–1989)
- Björn Kuipers (2006–2021)
- Roelof Luinge (1992–2000)
- Danny Makkelie (2011–present)
- Bas Nijhuis (2007–)
- René Temmink (2001–2006)
- Pol van Boekel (2008–)
- Mario van der Ende (1990–2002)
- Dick van Egmond (1997–2007)
- Tom van Sichem
- Pieter Vink (2004–2010)
- Jan Wegereef (1995–2007)
- Peter Gans (1975–1983)
- Serdar Gozubuyuk (2012–)

== New Caledonia ==
- Médéric Lacour (2016–)
- Bertrand Brial (Assistant referee 2016–)

== New Zealand ==
=== Referees ===
- Matt Conger (2013–present)
- Anna-Marie Keighley (2010–)
- Campbell-Kirk Waugh (Referee 2018–)
- Calvin Berg (2023–)
- Sarah Jones (2010 - )
- Bethany Ratray (2025 - )

=== Assistant Referees ===
- Mark Rule (Assistant Referee 2008–)
- Gareth Sheehan (Assistant Referee 2019–)
- Isaac Trevis (Assistant Referee 2019–)
- Edward Cook (Assistant Referee 2022–)
- Allys Clipsham (Assistant Referee 2025-)

=== Futsal Referees ===
- Chris Sinclair (2014–)
- Benjamin Norman (2023–)

=== Former officials ===
- Ross Anderson (Assistant Referee 1992–1993)
- John Berry (Assistant Referee ca. 1997–1998)
- Brent Best (Assistant Referee 2004–2012)
- Linda Black (ca. 1992 – ca. 1996)
- Nadia Browning (Assistant Referee 2013–2015, Referee ca. 2018–2022)
- Les Coffman (1968–1980)
- Jamie Cross (2010–2012)
- Lenox Sharp
- Lisa Benson (Assistant Referee 2006)
- Tom Delahunty (1968–1984)
- Charles Dickey (ca. 1960)
- Paul Dunham (2003–2007)
- Gary Fleet (1980–1993)
- Neil Fox (ca. 1996–2008)
- Lynn Fox (Assistant Referee 2000–2001)
- Ron Gallon (1990–1991)
- Bruce Grimshaw (ca. 1997 – 2000)
- Ron Harries (1972 – ca. 1979)
- Michael Hester (2007–2011)
- Jan Hintz (Assistant Referee 2008–2015)
- Ian Hiscox (Assistant Referee ca. 1994–1997, 1999)
- Sarah Jones (née Walker) (Assistant Referee 2014–2023)
- Robert Kayes (referee 1972–1987)
- Chris Kerr (2012–2017)
- Glen Lochrie (Assistant Referee 2008–2018)
- Simon Lount (Assistant Referee 2012–2018)
- Ewen McDonald (Assistant Referee ca. 1997–1999)
- Robin McDonald (ca. 1960–1985)
- Darrin Mitchell (Assistant Referee 2004–2006)
- Kevin Moffat (Assistant Referee 1997–1999)
- Peter O'Leary (2003–2015)
- Alan Pedley (Assistant Referee ca. 1997–1999)
- Howard Potter (1996–1997, Assistant Referee 1992–1994)
- Brian Precious (ca. 1997–1999)
- Steven Ray (Assistant Referee 1992–1998)
- Derek Rugg (ca. 1997–1999)
- Steve Sargent (Assistant Referee 1992–1995)
- Paul Smith (Assistant Referee ca. 1997–2002)
- Wayne Stapley (Assistant Referee 1997–2004)
- Jacqueline Stephenson (Assistant Referee 2007–2016)
- Barry Tasker (1988–1996)
- Nicholas van der Salm (Assistant Referee 2011–2013)
- Nick Waldron (Assistant Referee 2007–2010, Referee 2013–2023)
- Ken Wallace
- David Watkins (Assistant Referee ca. 1999)
- Mark Whitehead (Assistant Referee 2015–2019)
- Tim Willink (Assistant Referee ca. 1997)
- Chris Sinclair (Futsal Referee 2014–2024)

== Nicaragua ==
- José Guerrero (2002–)
- Óscar Dávila (2011–)
- Nitzar Sandoval (2018–)
- Erick Lezama (2019–)

== Niger ==
- Lucien Bouchardeau
- Ibrahim Chaibou (1996–2011)
- Abdoul-Aziz Hama (2002–)
- Ibrahim Mamane (2007–)
- Assoumane Moussa Gnali (2015–)
- Gomno Daouda (2013–)
- Abdoulaye Rhissa Almoustapha (2016–)
- Hassane Abdou (2015–)
- Mohamed Ali Moussa (2018–)

== Nigeria ==
- Emmanuel Imiere (2001–)
- Abdullahi Shuaibu (2014–)
- Abubakar Ago (2009–)
- Joshua Amao (2009–)
- Ferdinand Udoh (2013–)
- Benjamin Odey (2011–)
- Quadri Ololade Adebimpe (2016–)
- Osareniye Aigbe
- Folusho Ajayi (2014–)
- Jelili Ogunmuyiwa
- Joseph Odey Ogabor (2017–)
- Salisu Basheer (2016–)
- Ibrahim Towobola (2000)

== Northern Ireland ==
- Mark Courtney (2002–)
- David Malcolm (1999–)
- Adrian McCourt (2003–2009)
- Raymond Crangle (2009–)
- Alan Black(?–)
- Malcolm Moffatt
- Alan Snoddy (1980–2000)

== Norway ==
- Øyvind Alapnes (2005–)
- Kjell Alseth (1998–2004)
- Espen Berntsen (2002–2012)
- Ole Hermann Borgan
- Jonny Ditlefsen (1993–94, 1998–00)
- Svein-Erik Edvartsen (2007–present)
- Tore Hansen (2013–present)
- Terje Hauge (1993–2010)
- Tom Harald Hagen (2009–)
- Arvid Holmlund (1988–)
- Svein Oddvar Moen (2005–2022)
- Tom Henning Øvrebø (1994–2010)
- Roy Helge Olsen (1992–2002)
- Rune Pedersen (1987–2001)
- Brage Sandmoen (2003–2008)
- Tommy Skjerven (2001–2012)
- Per Ivar Staberg (2003–2007)

== Oman ==
- Mahmood Al Ghatrifi (2002–)
- Abdullah Al Hilali (2002–)
- Khamis Al Shammaki (2003–)
- Yaqoob Abdul Baki (2010–)
- Omar Al-Yaqoubi (2013–)
- Ahmed Al-Kaf (2012–)
- Mahmood Al-Majarafi (2015–)
- Khalid Al-Shaqsi (2015–)
- Qasim Al-Hatmi (2016–)

== Pakistan ==
- Mahmood Shah (1950s)
- Bahadur Khan (1960s)
- Afzal Khan (1960s)
- Issa Khan (1960s)
- Masudur Rahman (1962–1967)
- Sheikh Shaheb Ali (1962–1971)
- Zahurul Alam (1968–1971)
- Qazi Asif (1988–1996)
- Abdul Shakoor Baloch (1993–1998)
- Ahmed Jan (1994–??)

== Palestine ==
- Mahmoud Al Jaish (2001–)
- Anas Eid (2003–)
- Ibrahim Gharouf (2006–)
- Michael Hanania (2003–)
- Baraa Aisha (2016–)
- Khaled Ammar (2005–)
- Yasmin Nayroukh

== Panama ==
- Roberto Moreno (1996–2014)
- Jafeth Perea (2009–2017)
- John Pitti (2012–2021)
- Ariel Ameth Sánchez (2014–present)
- Rolando Vidal (2002–)
- José Kellys (2015–2020)
- Oliver Vergara (2019–present)

== Papua New Guinea ==
- Job Minan (2001–)
- Salaiau Sosogan (1997–)
- Amos Anio (2013–)
- Albert Maru (2013–)
- David Yareboinen (2013–)
- Danu Ganteng (2021–)

== Paraguay ==
- Carlos Amarilla (1997–2015)
- Ubaldo Aquino (1994–2003)
- Antonio Arias (2005–)
- Enrique Cáceres (2010–2018)
- Epifanio González (1994–2003)
- Gabriel González (1976–1987)
- Carlos Maciel (1979–1991)
- Ulises Mereles (2011–present)
- Marilin Miranda (2012–present)
- Héctor Ortiz (1967–1982)
- Julio Quintana (2009–present)
- Carlos Torres (1998–2012)
- Mario Díaz de Vivar (2013–present)
- Éber Aquino (2016–present)
- José Méndez (2016–present)
- Arnaldo Samaniego (2017–present)
- Juan Gabriel Benítez (2019–present)

== Peru ==
- Víctor Hugo Carrillo (2005–)
- Henry Gambetta (2010–present)
- Luis Antonio Garay (2015–)
- Manuel Garay (2002–2014)
- Diego Haro (2013–present)
- Gilberto Hidalgo
- Enrique Labo Revoredo (1973–1988)
- Héctor Pacheco (2002–)
- Víctor Hugo Rivera (2001–2012)
- Percy Rojas (2006–)
- Miguel Santiváñez (2012–present)
- Luis Seminario (2014–)
- Alberto Tejada Noriega (1986–1998)
- Arturo Yamazaki (later naturalized Mexican)
- Michael Espinoza (2016–)
- Joel Alarcón (2016–)

== Philippines ==
=== Current referees ===
==== Men's ====
===== Referees =====
- Clifford Daypuyat (2014–)
- Meliton Pelayo (2021–)
- Mick Jon Pineda (2022–)

===== Assistant referees =====
- Relly Balila (2015–)
- Krizmark Nañola (2017–)
- Francis Engalgado (2018–)
- Giovanni Lachica (2018–)

===== Futsal referees =====
- Jan Dlanor Initan (2022–)
- Fericival Orlanda (2022–)

==== Women's ====
===== Assistant referees =====
- Merlo Albano (2012–)

== Poland ==
- Marcin Borski (2006–)
- Pawel Gil (2009–2021)
- Grzegorz Gilewski (2004–2009)
- Jacek Granat (1994–2008)
- Alojzy Jarguz
- Michał Listkiewicz (1983–1996)
- Robert Małek (2001–)
- Szymon Marciniak (2011–)
- Marek Mikolajewski (2004–)
- Tomasz Mikulski (1995–)
- Paweł Raczkowski (2013–present)
- Daniel Stefański (2013–present)
- Bartosz Frankowski (2014–present)
- Tomasz Musiał (2014–present)

== Portugal ==
- Lucílio Batista (1996–2010)
- Olegário Benquerença (2001–2014)
- Paulo Costa (1999–)
- João Ferreira (2003–)
- Marco Bruno Santos Ferreira (2014–)
- António Garrido (1954–1982)
- Duarte Nuno Pereira Gomes (2002–2016)
- Bruno Paixão (2004–2012)
- Vítor Melo Pereira (1992–2002)
- Pedro Proença (2003–2015)
- Jorge Sousa (2006–2018)
- Carlos Miguel Taborda Xistra (2005–)
- Carlos Silva Valente (1984–1992)
- Rui Costa
- Artur Soares Dias (2010–)
- Hugo Miguel (2013–)
- Tiago Martins (2015–)
- Fábio Veríssimo (2015–)
- João Pinheiro (referee) (2016–)
- Luís Godinho (2017–)
- António Nobre (2019–)
- Vítor Ferreira (2020–)
- Iancu Vasilica (2021–)

== Puerto Rico ==
- Jesus Angel Lebron Delgado (2007–)
- William Anderson (2012–present)
- José Raúl Torres (2019–present)

== Qatar ==
- Taleb Ballan (1970s)
- Mubarak Waleed (1970s)
- Hani Ballan (1998–2004)
- Abdulrahman Al-Jassim (2013–)
- Khamis Al-Kuwari (2012–)
- Fahad Al-Marri (2012–2018)
- Khamis Al-Marri (2010–)
- Abdullah Balideh (2005–)
- Abdulrahman Abdou (2005–2016)
- Saoud Al-Athbah (2016–)
- Abdulla Al-Marri (2018–)

== Romania ==
- Cristian Balaj (2003–2016)
- Augustus Constantin (2002–)
- Sorin Corpodean (1997–)
- Alexandru Deaconu (2005–2012)
- Ioan Igna (1976–1989)
- István Kovács (2010–present)
- Nicolae Rainea (1967–1984)
- Alexandru Tudor (2001–2016)
- Ovidiu Hațegan (2008–present)
- Ion Craciunescu (1984–1996)

== Soviet Union and Russia ==
- Yuri Baskakov (1998–2009)
- Vladislav Bezborodov (2009–present)
- Valeri Butenko (1981–1991)
- Igor Egorov (2003–2012)
- Alexei Eskov (2009–2020)
- Aleksandr Gvardis (2003–2010)
- Nikolai Ivanov (2000–2010)
- Sergei Ivanov (2014–present)
- Valentin Ivanov (1997–2006)
- Sergei Karasev (2010–present)
- Vladimir Kazmenko (2011–2013)
- Sergey Lapochkin (2013–2021)
- Nikolay Latyshev (1952–1963)
- Maksim Layushkin (2009–2013)
- Kirill Levnikov (2016–present)
- Nikolai Levnikov (1990–2001)
- Aleksei Matyunin (2017–2021)
- Vitali Meshkov (2012–present)
- Vladimir Moskalyov (2019–present)
- Alexei Nikolaev (2007–2016)
- Pavel Kukuyan (2021–present)
- Alexey Spirin (1987–1992)
- Miroslav Stupar (1980–1985)
- Stanislav Sukhina (2003–2012)
- Mikhail Vilkov (2012–2018)
- Igor Zakharov (2005–2008)

== Rwanda ==
- Janvier Buregeya (2003–)
- Michel Gasingwa (1997–)
- Issa Kagabo (2002–)
- Hudu Munyemana (2001–)
- Gervais Munyanziza (2011–)
- Louis Hakizimana (2012–)
- Jean Claude Ishimwe (2015–)
- Abdoul Karim Twagirumukiza (2013–)
- Nsoro Ruzindana (2016–)
- Samuel Uwikunda (2017–)

== Saint Kitts and Nevis ==
- James Matthew (2003–)
- Kimbell Ward (2013–)
- Tristley Bassue (2015–)
- Trevester Richards (2018–)

== Saint Lucia ==
- Gilles Arthur (1997–)
- Francis Fanus (1997–)
- John George (2001–)
- Leo Clarke (2011–)

== Saint Vincent and the Grenadines ==
- Moeth Gaymes (2014–)

== San Marino ==
- Stefano Podeschi (2002–)
- Gabriele Rossi (2004–)

== São Tomé and Príncipe ==
- Hélio Espírito Santo (1999–)
- Valdemar Cassandra Costa (2002–)
- Ditonil da Costa Lima
- Raul Aguiar dos Santos (2013–)
- Esterline Gonçalves Género (2016–)

== Saudi Arabia ==
- Fallaj Al-Shanar (1984–1987)
- Abdullah Al Nasir (1986–1988)
- Ibrahim Al-Omar (1994–2000)
- Abdulaziz Al-Dakhil (1997–2001)
- Mohammed Al-Sharif (1996–2002)
- Abdul Rahman Al-Zaid (1998–2002)
- Yousef Al-Aqeely (2001–2003)
- Omer Al Mehannah (1992–2004)
- Nasser Al-Hamdan (1996–2007)
- Daffer Al Shehri (2004–2007)
- Mamdouh Al Mirdasi (2003–2009)
- Abdulrahman Al Harbi (2005–2009)
- Khalil Al Ghamdi (2003–2014)
- Abdulrahman Al Amri (2003–2015)
- Marai Al-Awaji (2010–present)
- Fahad Al-Mirdasi (2011–2018)
- Saleh Al-Hethlol (2013–present)
- Mohammed Al-Hoish (2014–present)
- Turki Al-Khudhayr (2014–present)
- Shukri Al-Hunfush (2015–present)
- Khalid Al-Turais (2016–present)

== Scotland ==
- Greg Aitken
- Crawford Allan (2002–2017)
- Euan Anderson
- William Anderson
- Connor Ashwood
- Graham Beaton
- Jeff Banks
- John Beaton (2012–present) – FIFA First Category for 2024
- Euan Birch
- Ross Birrell
- Iain Brines (2003–2009)
- George Calder
- Craig Charleston
- Kevin Clancy (2012–)
- Kenny Clark (1993–2008)
- Martin Clark
- Kylie Cockburn (2013–2021)
- Willie Collum (2006–) – FIFA Elite Category for 2024
- Brian Colvin
- Steve Conroy (1993–2012)
- Barry Cook
- Peter Craigmyle
- Bill Crombie
- Jordan Curran
- Andrew Dallas (2015–2019)
- Hugh Dallas (1993–2002)
- Mark Daly
- Bobby Davidson
- David Dickinson – FIFA Second Category for 2024
- Stuart Dougal (1996–2007)
- Gavin Duncan
- Jim Duncan
- Stephen Finnie (1994–2018)
- Chris Fordyce
- Alan Freeland
- Andy Gamble
- Chris Graham
- Kevin Graham
- Graham Grainger
- Daniel Graves
- Alastair Grieve
- Gary Hanvidge
- Ross Hardie
- Josh Hay
- Abbie Hendry
- Gary Hilland
- Lewis Hogarth
- Douglas Hope
- Kenny Hope
- Willie Hornby
- Grant Irvine
- Joel Kennedy
- Steven Kirkland
- Scott Lambie
- Ryan Lee
- David Lowe
- Stewart Luke
- Craig Mackay
- Bobby Madden (2010–2022)
- Eric Martindale
- Jim McCluskey (1980–2000)
- Mike McCurry (1996–2004)
- Matthew MacDermid – FIFA Second Category for 2024
- Dougie McDonald (2000–2010)
- Dan McFarlane
- Brian McGinlay (1977–1990)
- John McKendrick (2013–)
- Steven McLean
- Scott Millar
- Ryan Milne
- Leslie Mottram (1991–1996)
- Jack Mowat (1946–1960)
- Alan Muir
- David Munro – FIFA Second Category for 2024
- Sean Murdoch
- Calum Murray (2005–2013)
- Craig Napier (2013–2022)
- Alan Newlands
- Mat Northcroft
- Morag Pirie (2004–)
- Steven Reid
- Charlie Richmond (2003–2009)
- Des Roache
- Don Robertson (2017–) – FIFA Second Category for 2024
- Paul Robertson
- Mike Roncone
- Gavin Ross
- John Rowbotham
- Sandy Roy
- Calum Scott
- Duncan Smith
- George Smith (1989–1990)
- Iain Snedden
- Greg Soutar
- Colin Steven
- Cameron Stirling
- Peter Stuart
- David Syme
- Willie Syme
- Bobby Tait
- Mike Taylor
- Kevin Toner
- Craig Thomson (2003–2018)
- Louis Thow
- Mike Tumilty (1987–2003)
- John Underhill (1994–2006)
- Bob Valentine (1978–1989)
- Andrew Waddell (1989–1997)
- Nick Walsh (2018–) – FIFA First Category for 2024
- Lorraine Watson
- Tiny Wharton (1951–1970)
- Colin Whyte
- Jamie Wilkie
- Duncan Williams
- Lloyd Wilson
- Scott Wilson
- Brian Winter (2010–2012)
- Willie Young

Updated 24 October 2026

== Senegal ==
- Badara Diatta (1999–2015)
- Falla N'Doye (1995–2005)
- Daouda Guèye (2011–)
- Falou Galasse Kane (2014–)
- Malang Diedhiou (2008–2018)
- Maguette N'Diaye (2011–)
- Issa Sy (2015–)
- Alioune Sow Sandigui (2014–)

== Serbia ==
- Zoran Petrović (1983–1997)
- Vlado Glodović (2010–)
- Milian Ilic (2015–)
- Srđan Jovanović (2015–)
- Boško Jovanetić (2008–)
- Milorad Mažić (2009–2019)
- Dragomir Stanković (2005–2011)
- Jovan Borovic (2004–2007)
- Igor Radojčić (2004–2013)

== Seychelles ==
- Jacques André (2005–)
- Jourdan Benstrong (2003–)
- Jean-Claude Labrosse (2001–)
- Eddy Maillet (2001–2011)
- Bernard Camille (2011–)
- Nelson Fred (Nelson Emile Fred) (2012–)
- Nelson Emile (2013–)
- Allister Barra (2013–)

== Sierra Leone ==
- Ahmed Bangura (2008–)
- Ahmed Nasser (2007–)
- Edward Parkinson (1996–)
- Rashid Sanusie (1999–)
- Raymond Coker (2010–)
- Daudu Williams (2009–)

== Singapore ==
- Abdul Malik Bashir (2002–2013)
- Abas Daud (2006–)
- S Kumar (2007–)
- Shamsul Maidin (1996–2007)
- Pandian Palaniyandi (2007–2012)
- Sukhbir Singh (2009–)
- Muhammad Taqi Aljaafari Bin Jahari (2012–)
- Leow Thiam Hoe (2009–)
- Jansen Foo (2014–present)
- Ahmad A'Qashah (2013–)

== Slovakia ==
- Vladimír Hriňák (1993–2009)
- Ľuboš Micheľ (1993–2008)
- Pavel Olšiak (2005–)
- Anton Stredák (1995–2004)
- Lukáš Peško (2010–present)
- Ivan Kružliak (2011–present)
- Filip Glova (2016–present)
- Peter Kráľovič (2013–present)
- Michal Očenáš (2017–present)
- Rastislav Behančín (2017–present)
- Peter Budáč (2020–present)
- Martin Matula (2020–present)
- Ladislav Angyal (2020–present)
- Erik Gemzický (2021–present)

== Slovenia ==
- Darko Čeferin (2000–2012)
- Matej Jug (2007–)
- Robert Kranjc (2002–)
- Damir Skomina (2003–2021)
- Slavko Vinčić (2010–)

== Solomon Islands ==
- Ben Aukwai (2022–present)
- Christopher Lengeta (2007–)
- Andrew Moli (2003–)
- John Saohu (2008–)
- Nelson Sogo (2002–)
- Gerald Oiaka (2009–)
- George Time (2010–)

== Somalia ==
- Abdi Abdulle Ahmed (1998–)
- Moktar Mo'alim Yusuf (2011)
- Hassan Mohamed Hagi (2014–)
- Hagi Wiish (2011–)
- Mohamed Mokhtar Sheikh(1986)
- Omar Artan (2018–)
- Mohamed Nur Muhudin (2018–)
- Abdi Omar Abdirahman(2010–)
- Mahad Ali Mohamoud (2014–)
- Adam Ali Eid (2020–)
- Ahmed Hassan Hussein (2020–)

== South Africa ==
- Daniel Bennett (2003–2019)
- Jerome Damon (2000–2014)
- Victor Gomes (2011–2022)
- Morgamat Julius (2014–)
- Ian McLeod
- Lwandile Mfiki (2011–present)
- Jonas Nhlapo (2004–)
- Tinyiko Victor Hlungwani (2011–)
- Kalulasande Qongqo (2013–present)
- Christopher Harrison (2017–)
- Thando Ndzandzeka (2017–)

== South Sudan ==
- Gait Metodious Oting (2015–)
- Ring Nyier Akech Malong (2015–)
- Alier Michael James (2015–)
- George Primito Olibo (2015–)

== Spain ==
- Ramón Azon Roma (1950 World Cup)
- Ricardo de Burgos Bengoetxea (2018–present)
- Augusto Lamo Castillo (1977–1985)
- Francisco Bru Sanz (1917–1949)
- Manuel Díaz Vega (1991–1999)
- Pedro Escartín
- David Fernández Borbalán (2010–2018)
- José García Aranda (1991–2000)
- Ignacio Iglesias Villanueva
- Eduardo Iturralde González (1998–2012)
- Jose Gonzalez Gonzalez
- J.A.Rojas
- I. Garrido
- Antonio López Nieto (1991–2003)
- M.Lopez
- Juan Martínez Munuera (2013 -) (FIFA 2015–)
- Antonio Mateu Lahoz (2004–2023)(FIFA 2011–2023)
- S.Latre
- Luis Medina Cantalejo (2002–2009)
- Carlos Velasco Carballo (2008–2016)
- Carlos del Cerro Grande (2013–2023)
- Manuel Mejuto González (1999–2010)
- Carlos Padrós
- Alfonso Pérez Burrull (2002–2010)
- Emilio Soriano Aladrén (1978–1992)
- Alberto Undiano Mallenco (2006–2019)
- Victoriano Sánchez Arminio (1978–1989)
- Carlos Clos Gómez (2009–present)
- Javier Estrada Fernandez (2013–2021)
- Jesus Manzano (2014–present)
- Alejandro Hernández (2014–present)
- José María Sánchez Martínez (2017–present)
- M.Sanchez
- Trujillo Suarez
- Marta Huerta de Aza (2016–present)
- Eugenia Gil Soriano (2019–present)
- Zulema González González (2017–present)
- Olatz Rivera Olmedo (2017–present)
- Elisabeth Calvo Valentín (2022–present)

== Sri Lanka ==
- Hettikamkanamge Perera (2004–)
- Nivon Robesh Gamini (2010–)

== Sudan ==
- Shams Al Marif Bakhit (1996–2003)
- Badr Abdel Gadir (2004–)
- Khalid Abdel Rahman (2001–)
- Ahmed El Nigomi (2004–)
- Sabit Rassas (2002–)
- El Fadil Mohamed (2008–)
- Mutaz Khairalla (2012–)
- El Fatih Wadeed Khaleel (2014–)
- Mahmood Ismail (2015–)
- Sabri Mohamed Fadul (2015–)
- Hafiz Abdelghani Alamen (2015–)
- Elsiddig Mohamed Eltreefe (2017–)
- Adel Mukhtar Adam (2016–)

== Suriname ==
=== Men's ===
==== Football referees ====
- Jerry Budel (2002–)
- Henry Kia (1999–)
- Antonius Pinas (1996–)
- Enrico Wijngaarde (2002–2014)
- Johannes Dolaini (2013–2019)
- Sergio Rozenhout(2022–)

==== Assistant referees ====
- Zachari Zeegelaar (2014–)
- Soren Amalensi
- Widjay Sardjoe(2019–)

==== Futsal referee ====
- Anthony Terborg

=== Women's ===
==== Assistant referees ====
- Mijensa Rench
- Suelle Shepperd

== Sweden ==
- Mohammed Al-Hakim (2015–)
- Andreas Ekberg (2013–present)
- Ivan Eklind
- Jonas Eriksson (2002–2018)
- Erik Fredriksson (1973–1989)
- Anders Frisk (1991–2005)
- Peter Fröjdfeldt (2001–2008)
- Martin Hansson (2001–2014)
- Martin Ingvarsson (1997–2010)
- Bo Karlsson (1986–1994)
- Ludvig Kornerup
- Glenn Nyberg (2016–)
- Daniel Stålhammar (2004–2013)
- Markus Strömbergsson (2006–2012)
- Leif Sundell (1983–2003)

== Switzerland ==
=== Futsal referees ===
- Matkovic Daniel (2015–present)
- Boskovic Darko (2022–present)
- Schärli David (2014–present)
- Rothenflüh Marco (2014–present)

=== Football referees ===
- Sascha Amhof (2013–present)
- Carlo Bertolini (1997–)
- Massimo Busacca (1999–2011)
- Claudio Circhetta (2005–2010)
- André Daina (1976–1986)
- Gottfried Dienst
- Bruno Galler (1978–1992)
- Adrien Jaccottet (2012–2021)
- Stephan Klossner (2012–present)
- Jérôme Laperrière (2006–)
- Urs Meier (1994–2004)
- Serge Muhmenthaler (1989–1998)
- Kurt Röthlisberger (1985–1996)
- Stephan Studer (2009–2015)
- Cyril Zimmermann (2007–)
- Jonas Guex
- Benjamin Mastai (2008–)
- Fedayi San (2015–)

== Syria ==
- Jamal Al Sharif
- Muhsen Basma (2003–)
- Ahmad Dellou (2005–)
- Abdulrahman Recho (2004–)
- Masoud Tufayelieh (2010–)
- Feras Taweel (2011–)
- Hanna Hattab (2015–)

== Tahiti ==
- Norbert Hauata (2008–)
- Averii Jacques (2007–)
- Abdelkader Zitouni (2012–)

== Tajikistan ==
- Khurshed Dadoboev (2006–)
- Ravshan Ishmatov (2006–)
- Rustam Kholov (2006–)
- Dilovar Orzuev (2005–)
- Nasrullo Kabirov (2013–)
- Sadullo Gulmurodi (2017–)

== Tanzania ==
- Ramadhan Kibo Ibada (2004–)
- Israel Mujuni (2009–)
- Mfaume Ali Nassoro (2015–)
- Waziri Waziri (2005–)
- Martin Elifhas Saanya (2017–)
- Elly Ally Sasii (2017–)
- Ahmed Arajiga (2022–)

== Thailand ==
- Apisit Aonrak (2009–2012)
- Alongkorn Feemuechang (2014–2017)
- Chaiya Mahapab (2007–2014)
- Mongkolchai Pechsri (2010–)
- Prathan Nasawang (2010–2013)
- Porached Wongkamdee (2010–2012)
- Prayoon Veerapool (2001–2010)
- Pirom Un-prasert (1992–1998)
- Sakda Pansut (2011–2012)
- Sivakorn Pu-udom (2013–)
- Songkran Bunmeekiart (2019–)
- Suprem Nonthawong (2013–2017)
- Sura Sriart (2009–2011)
- Surasak Kundiloksirodom (2009–2010)
- Teetichai Nualjan (2012–2018)
- Torphong Somsing (2019–)
- Warintorn Sassadee (2016–)
- Wiwat Jumpaoon (2018–)

== Togo ==
- Kokou Atsoo (2003–)
- Kokou Djaoupe (2001–)
- Kokou Fagla (2003–)
- Dodji Mawuk Hounnake Kouassi
- Kossi Sedjro (2003–)
- Komlan Sousou (2002–)
- Kossi Azaleko (2013–)
- Yanissou Bebou (2014–)
- Kokou Ognankotan Ntale (2015–)
- Yelebodom Gado Mawabwe Bodjona (2019–)

== Tonga ==
- Ichikawa Polovili (2009–)

== Trinidad and Tobago ==
- Neal Brizan (2002–)
- Geoffrey Hospedales (2008–)
- Ramesh Ramdhan (1990–2005)
- Noel Bynoe
- Robert Anthony Banfield (1960–)
- Joel Davidson (2013–)
- Rodphin Harris (2013–)
- Caleb Wales (2013–)
- Keon Yorke (2015–)

== Tunisia ==
- Kacem Bennaceur (2004–)
- Ali Bin Nasser (1976–1991)
- Mourad Daami (1998–2006)
- Riadh Herzi (2005–)
- Neji Jouini (1982–1994)
- Yosr Saadallah (2005–)
- Aouaz Trabelsi (2005–)
- Nasrallah Jaouadi (2011–)
- Haithem Kossaï (2015–)
- Slim Belkhouas (2013–)
- Mohamed Said Kordi (2011–)
- Youssef Essrayri (2012–)
- Sadok Selmi (2016–)
- Haythem Guirat (2016–)
- Walid Djeridi (2018–)
- Mohamed Yosri Bouali (2019–)

== Turkey ==
- Muvahhit Afir
- Serdar Akçer
- İbrahim Aksoy
- İsmet Arzuman
- Fırat Aydınus (2006–2018)
- Metin Aydoğan
- Doğan Babacan
- Cezmi Başar
- Vahap Beyaz
- Muhittin Boşat
- Orhan Cebe
- Hasan Ceylan
- Ahmet Çakar (1992–1999)
- Cüneyt Çakır (2006–2022)
- Sabri Çelik
- Ünsal Çimen
- Mustafa Çulcu
- Sadık Deda
- Bülent Demirlek
- Selçuk Dereli (2003–2010)
- Ertuğrul Dilek
- Gamze Durmuş
- Erol Ersoy
- Sulhi Garan
- Mustafa Gerçeker
- Hüseyin Göçek
- Erkan Göksel
- Orhan Gönül
- Hakkı Gürüz
- Mete Kalkavan (2008–)
- İlhami Kaplan
- Coşkun Kutay
- Yusuf Namoğlu
- Özcan Oal
- Hilmi Ok (1976–1981)
- Nihat Özbirgül
- Halis Özkahya (2009–)
- Tolga Özkalfa
- Ali Palabıyık (2015–)
- Cem Papila
- Muzaffer Sarvan
- Oğuz Sarvan (1991–2000)
- Nejat Şener
- Barış Şimşek
- Faruk Talu
- Metin Tokat (1995–2003)
- Talat Tokat
- Erman Toroğlu (1989–1994)
- Ziya Türkdoğan
- İhsan Türe
- Bülent Yavuz
- Bülent Yıldırım (2011–)
- Yunus Yıldırım
- Vedat Yüksel
- Semih Zoroğlu
- Halil Umut Meler

== Turkmenistan ==
- Çarymyrat Kurbanow (2003–)
- Berdimyrat Niyazdurdyev (2003–)
- Kakabay Seydov (2001–)

== Turks and Caicos Islands ==
- Gianni Ascani (2015–2017)
- Dane Ritchie (2016–2018)

== Uganda ==
- Denis Batte (2007–)
- Ali Kalyango (2004–)
- Fredrick Kayindi-Ngobi (2003–)
- Charles Masembe
- Daniel Nkata (1960–1966)
- Muhmed Ssegonga (2002–)
- Brian Miiro (2010–)
- Mashood Ssali (2014–)
- Alex Muhabi (2014–)
- Rajab Bakasambe
- Ali Sabilla (2015–)
- William Oloya (2018–)

== Ukraine ==
- Anatoliy Abdula (2012–present)
- Yevhen Aranovskyi (2011–present)
- Serhiy Boyko (2011–present)
- Serhiy Dankovskyi (2009–2012)
- Oleksandr Derdo (2011–present)
- Vitaliy Hodulian (2001–2010)
- Ihor Ishchenko (2001–2010)
- Yaroslav Kozyk (2013–present)
- Yuriy Moseychuk (2008–2010)
- Yuriy Mozharovskyi (2011–present)
- Oleh Oriekhov (2003–2010)
- Andriy Shandor (2002–2011)
- Viktor Shvetsov (2008–2012)
- Anatoliy Zhabchenko (2013–2017)

== United Arab Emirates ==
- Fareed Al Marzouqi (2000–)
- Mohamed Al Saeedi (2001–)
- Khalid Al Senan (2005–)
- Ali Hamad Albadwawi (2005–)
- Mohamed Ali Aljunaibi (2005–)
- Ali Bujsaim (1990–2004)
- Mohamed Zarouni (2002–)
- Mohammed Abdulla Hassan Mohamed (2010–)
- Ammar Al-Jeneibi (2011–)
- Sultan Al-Marzooqi (2015–)
- Yaqoub Al-Hammadi (2015–)
- Omar Al Ali (2015–)
- Adel Al-Naqbi (2016–)

== United States ==
2026 US FIFA Referees:

- Alex Billeter (2023-)
- Danielle Chesky (2020–)
- Joe Dickerson (2023-)
- Ismail Elfath (2016–)
- Jon Freemon (2024-)
- Guido Gonzales Jr (2025-)
- Ekaterina Koroleva (2014–)
- Rosendo Mendoza (2026-)
- Alyssa Pennington (2023-)
- Tori Penso (2021–)
- Victor Rivas (2023-)
- Natalie Simon (2022–)
- Lucas Szpala (2024-)
- Rubiel Vazquez (2020–)
- Anya Voigt (2024-)
- Armando Villarreal (2015–)

2026 USA FIFA Assistant Referees

- Kyle Atkins (2018–)
- Cameron Blanchard (2019–)
- Logan Brown (2020–)
- Chris Elliot (2024-)
- Jose Da Silva (2023-)
- Jennifer Garner (2018–)
- Ryan Graves (2024-)
- Jeremy Kieso (2022–)
- Felisha Mariscal (2014–)
- Brooke Mayo (2018–)
- Alicia Messer (2018–)
- Meghan Mullen (2022–)
- Kathryn Nesbitt (2016–)
- Corey Parker (2015–)
- Salma Perez (2023-)
- Cory Richardson (2022–)
- Kali Smith (2023-)
- Tiffini Turpin (2023-)
- Luis "Nick" Uranga (2020–)'
- Katarzyna Wasiak (2024-)

2026 US FIFA Video Match Officials (VAR):

- Kyle Atkins (2022–)
- Allen Chapman (2021–)
- Joe Dickerson (2023-)
- Tim Ford (2021–)
- Edvin Jurisevic (2021–)
- Katja Koroleva (2023-)
- Felisha Mariscal (2022–)
- Brooke Mayo (2023-)
- Kathryn Nesbitt (2022–)
- Chris Penso (2021–)
- Jose Carlos Rivero (2026-)
- Armando Villarreal (2022–)

2026 US FIFA Futsal Referees:

- Servando Berna Rico (2026-)
- Drew Klemp (2026-)
- Krystin Pahia (2024-)
- Matt Rodman (2024-)

2026 US FIFA Beach Soccer Referees:

- Vincent Apple-Chiarella (2026-)
- Conrado Garcia Corredor (2026-)

Former US FIFA Referees:

- Karen Abt (2016-2021)
- Arturo Angeles (1989–1998)
- Esfandiar Baharmast (1993–1998)
- Andrew Barnes (2000-2001)
- Elias Bazakos (2012)
- Jennifer Bennett (2003–2011)
- Edward Bellion (1980–1989)
- John Best (1948-1963)
- James Black (1966-1970)
- Zimmerman Boulos (1994-1997)
- Angelo Bratsis (1980–1991)
- David Coombs (1980–1992)
- Gus Constantine (1983-1985)
- Ed Cummings (1990-1992)
- Jack D’Aquila (1991-1994)
- Helder Dias (1993-1994)
- Ernest Dingesz (1973-1976)
- Dilvo DiPlacido (1985-1989)
- Gino D'Ippolito (1975-1985)
- Margaret Domka (2007-2015)
- John Di Salvatore (1966-1973)
- Raul Dominguez(1990-1997)
- Edward Donaghy (1934)
- Robert Evans (1979–1987)
- Feliks Fuksman (1986-1987)
- Prudencio Garcia (1949-1952)
- Mark Geiger (2008–2019)
- Janice Gettemeyer (1997)
- Richard Giebner (1961-1970)
- Leo Goldstein (1959-1967)
- David Gould (1926–1934)
- Rich Grady (1998-2003)
- Juan Guzman (2013-2014)
- Brian Hall (1992–2006)
- Catherine Leann Hepburn (1995-1996)
- Sandra Hunt (1999-2004)
- Majid Jay(1989-1993)
- Edvin Jurisevic (2010–2017)
- Michael Kennedy (1999–2006)
- Alfred Kleinaitis (1985-1990)
- Toros Kibitjian (1968–1982)
- Larry King (1965-1977)
- Raymond Kraft (1956,1960-1966)
- Howard Krollfeifer (1979-1986)
- Henry Landauer(1964-1979)
- Jair Marrufo (2007-2022)
- Samantha Martinez (2023)
- Vincent Mauro (1986–1991)
- Nancy Lay-McCormick (1999-2000)
- Antonio Nobile (1974-1979)
- Joshua Patlak (1994–1998)
- Chris Penso (2013–2015)
- William Peters (1963-1966)
- John Pitchok (1963-1964)
- Alex Prus (2004–2009)
- James Ross (1977-1980)
- Nima Saghafi (2020-2023)
- Ali Sahili (1999-unknown)
- Julio Salas (1988-1989)
- Ricardo Salazar (2005–2015)
- Sandra Sarafini (2006-2009)
- Roger Schott (1972-1977)
- Kari Seitz (1999–2013)
- David Socha (1978–1986)
- Kevin Stott (1995–2008)
- Thomas Syme (1949-1968)
- Paul Tamberino (1998−2001)
- Kevin Terry (1998–2004)
- Baldomero Toledo (2007–2017)
- Christina Unkel (2013-2019)
- Ted Unkel (2016–2021)
- Ricardo Valenzuela (1999−2005)
- Gegham Vardanyan (2004–2008)
- Henry Vallina (1964-1965)
- Terry Vaughn (2004–2011)
- Tim Weyland(1995-2000)
- Mike Wuertz (1967-1979)
- Rachel Woo (2001-2007)

== United States Virgin Islands ==
- Hillaren Frederick (2000–)

== Uruguay ==
- Juan Daniel Cardellino (1976–1990)
- Fernando Falce (2013–present)
- Daniel Fedorczuk (2011–present)
- Christian Ferreyra (2013–present)
- Ernesto Filippi (1991–1995)
- Jonhatan Fuentes (2015–present)
- Jorge Larrionda (1998–2012)
- Julio Matto
- Gustavo Méndez (1990–2000)
- Líber Prudente (1997–)
- Roberto Silvera (2003–2015)
- Darío Ubriaco (2008–)
- Martín Vázquez (2001–2014)
- Claudia Umpierrez (2010–present)
- Andrés Cunha (2013–present)
- Esteban Ostojich (2016–present)
- Óscar Rojas (2016–present)
- Leodán González (2016–present)
- Gustavo Tejera (2018–present)

== Uzbekistan ==
- Vadim Agishev (2008–)
- Aziz Asimov (2013–present)
- Ravshan Irmatov (2003–2019)
- Marat Ismailov (2001–)
- Valentin Kovalenko (2002–)
- Vladislav Tseytlin (2002–)
- Ilgiz Tantashev (2013–present)
- Sherzod Kasimov (2014–)

== Vanuatu ==
- Lencie Fred (2000–2009)
- Robinson Banga (2010–)
- Joel Hopkken (2007–)

== Venezuela ==
- Candelario Andarcia (2005–)
- José Argote (2008–present)
- Gustavo Brand
- Adrián Cabello (2013–present)
- Marlon Escalante (2009–present)
- Mayker Gomez (2006–)
- Jose L. Hoyo (2011–present)
- Denis Duque Parra (2005–)
- Giovanni Perluzzo (2008–)
- Juan Soto (2005–)
- Jesús Valenzuela (2013–present)
- Alexis Herrera (2017–present)
- Ángel Arteaga (2019–present)

== Vietnam ==
- Đặng Thanh Hạ (2000–)
- Dương Văn Hiền (2002–)
- Võ Minh Trí (2001–2017)
- Phùng Đình Dũng (2008–)
- Định Văn Dũng (2013–)
- Nguyễn Đức Vũ (2013–)
- Nguyễn Hiền Triết (2015–)
- Ngô Duy Lân (2017–)
- Hoàng Ngọc Hà (2021–)
- Nguyễn Mạnh Hải (2022–)

== Wales ==
Years for referees appointed before 1992 refer to their years on the English Football League List; years spent on the Welsh FIFA List and English Premier League List are added where applicable.

- Ron Bridges 1978–1989: Welsh FIFA List 1977–1987
- Keith Burge 1986–1999: Premier League 1993–1999; Welsh FIFA list 1989–1995
- Leo Callaghan 1954–1971: Welsh FIFA List 1956–1970
- Keith Cooper 1982–1996: Premier League 1993–1996; Welsh FIFA list 1985–1993
- Haydn Davies 1965–1968
- Lee Evans
- Rodger Gifford 1984–1996: Premier League 1992–1995; Welsh FIFA list 1982–1993
- John Gow 1963–1978; FIFA List 1966–1978
- Iwan Griffith
- Mervyn Griffiths 1948–1959; Welsh FIFA List
- Huw Jones FIFA List 2005–2012
- Iorrie Jones 1966–1975: Welsh FIFA List 1972–1974
- Howard King 1980–1994: Welsh FIFA list 1980–1991
- John Lloyd 1985–1996: Premier League 1993–1994; Welsh FIFA List 1985–1993
- Bryn Markham-Jones FIFA List 2013–
- Gwyn Owen 1977–1982: Welsh FIFA List 1980–1982
- Tom Reynolds 1968–1979: Welsh FIFA List 1971–1979
- Ceri Richards FIFA List 1994–
- Francgon Roberts 1981–1990: Welsh FIFA List
- Clive Thomas 1966–1984: Welsh FIFA List 1968–1984
- Mark Whitby FIFA List 2003–

== Yemen ==
- Foud Al Gunaid (2001–)
- Khalaf Al Labany (2001–)
- Mukhtar Al Yarimi (2001–)

== Zambia ==
- Wellington Kaoma (2000–)
- Wilson Mpanisi (2002–)
- Cornelius Mwansa (2000–)
- Wisdom Chewe (2013–)
- Janny Sikazwe (2007–2022)
- Stanley Hachiwa (2013–)
- Diana Chikotesha (2014–)
- Audrick Nkole (2018–)

== Zimbabwe ==
- Tendayi Bwanya (2003–)
- Christopher Manuel (2003–)
- Kenias Marange (1998–)
- Tabani Mnkantjo (2002–)
- Norman Matemera (2010—)
- Ruzive Ruzive (2010–)
- Pilan Ncube (2016–)
- Nomore Murambiwa Musundire (2016–)
- Brighton Chimene (2019–)
