= FIFA International Referees List =

Published list of football referees

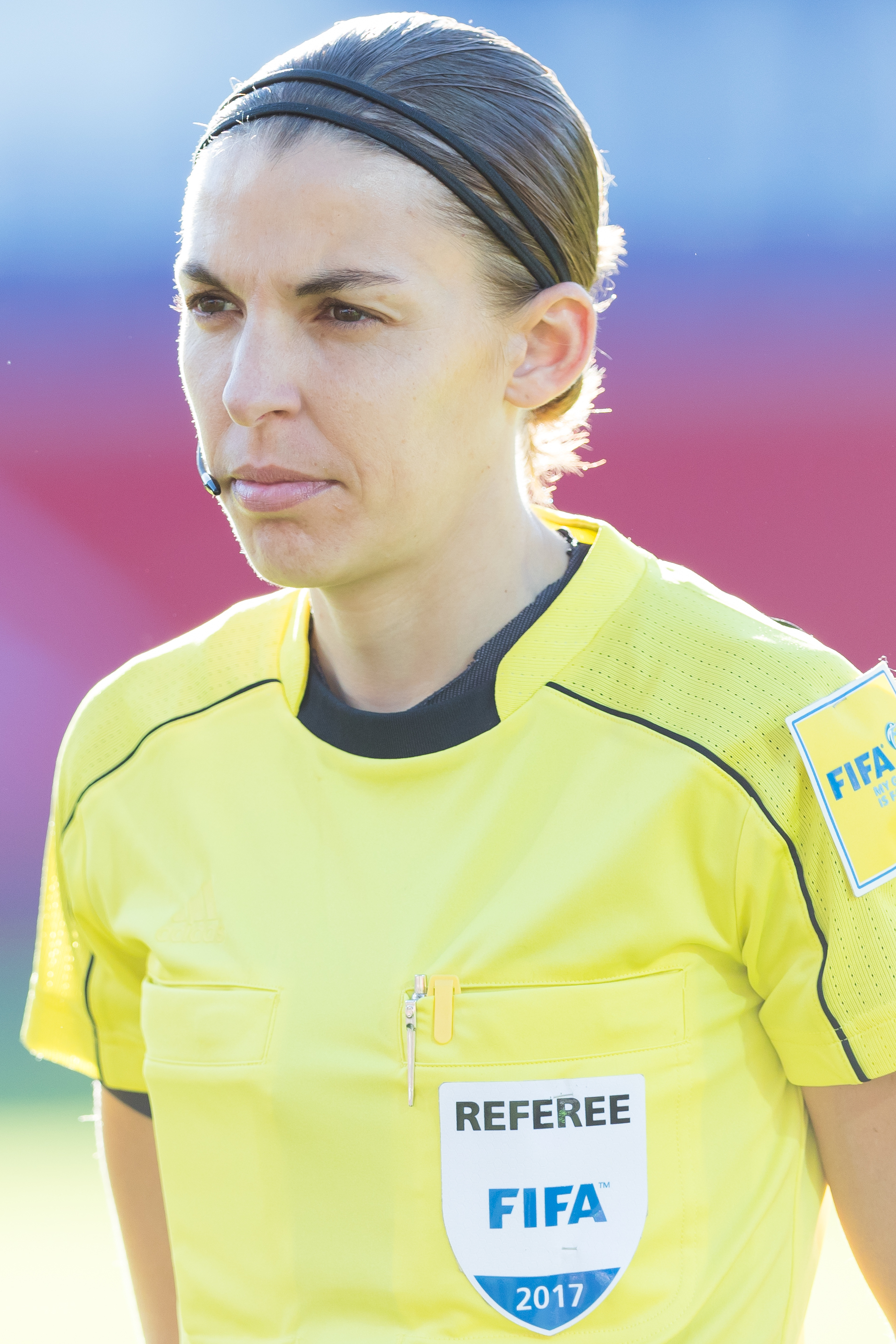

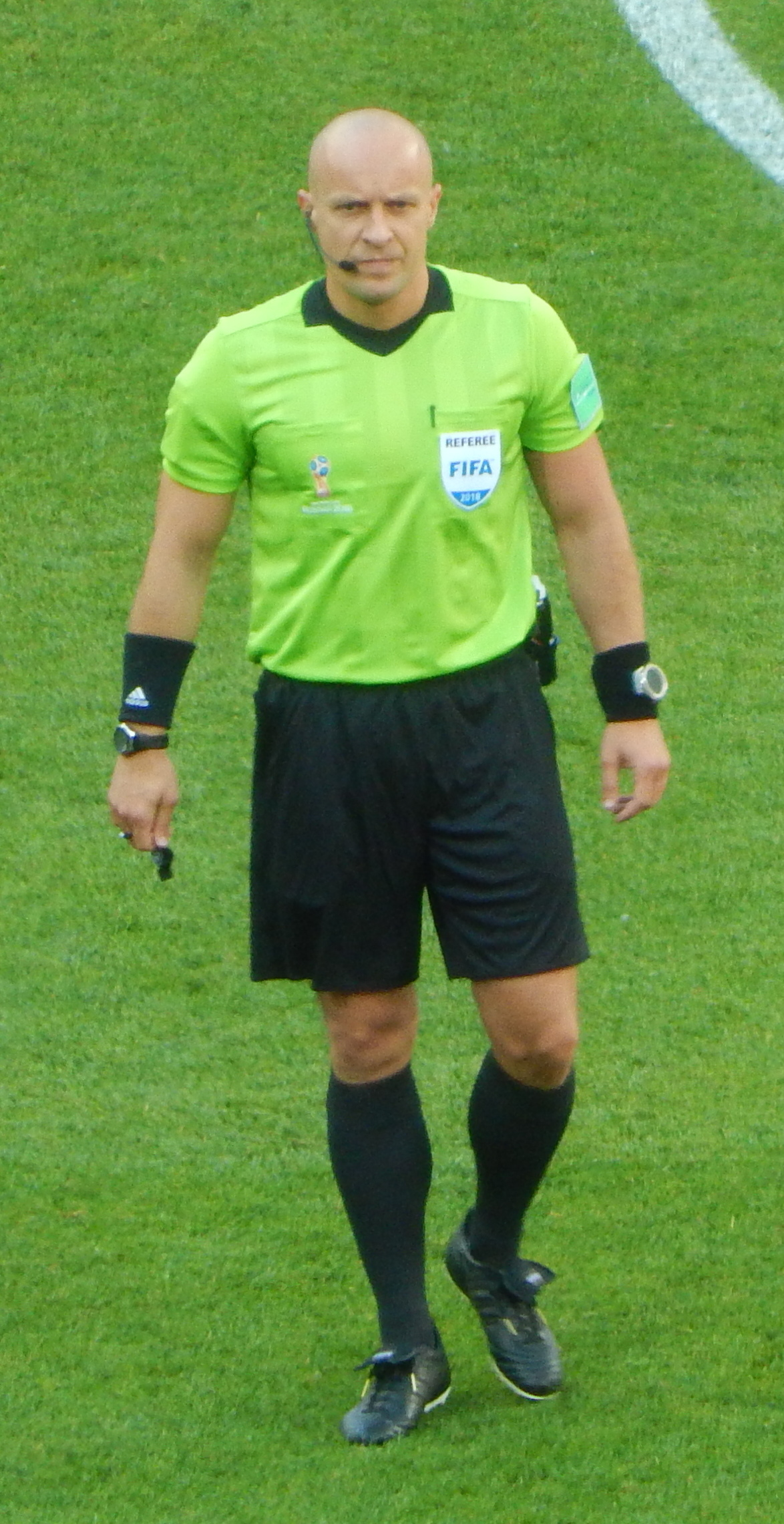
Stéphanie Frappart (top) and Szymon Marciniak (bottom)

The FIFA International Referees List is an annual publication of the global list of FIFA international referees in the football-variants controlled by FIFA – association football (outdoor football), futsal and beach soccer. Members of the list are qualified to officiate at international level and are entitled to wear on their uniform for the year in which they listed.

== Nomination ==
FIFA member countries are invited annually to nominate male and female officials for association football, futsal and beach soccer. Each country's Referee's Committee selects the referees to be nominated to FIFA.

FIFA maintains five lists in total: men's and women's association football referees, men's and women's futsal referees, and a single list of beach soccer referees. Officials in the association football lists are nominated as either referees, assistant referees and/or video match officials. Futsal and beach soccer at international level are usually controlled by two on-field referees and there is no equivalent of the assistant referee.

== Fitness ==
Referees nominated to the list must pass fitness tests consisting of a series of 40 metres (130 ft) sprints and an interval test consisting of 75 metres (246 ft) sprints and 2x 12.5 metre recovery walks. Assistant referees nominated to the list must pass fitness tests consisting of a CODA-drill, series of 30 metres (98 ft) sprints and an interval test consisting of 75 metres (246 ft) sprints and 2x 12.5 metre recovery walks.

== FIFA badge ==
On being selected to the list, referees receive a badge from FIFA. The badge indicates the category of official in which they have been listed – referee, assistant referee, Futsal referee or beach soccer referee. While officiating matches in the category they have been nominated, the referee is expected to wear the badge. Where a referee is controlling a match outside of their category (e.g. an assistant referee acting as a central referee or a Futsal referee controlling an outdoor match) the badge is not worn. Members of the women's list are only allowed to work men's international matches if they have completed the men's fitness tests. Being listed for the first time is often referred to as receiving a FIFA badge.

FIFA badge insignia since 2021

== Age ==
A referee must be at least 25 years old on 1 January to be eligible for International Referee listing nomination on that calendar year. An assistant referee is eligible at the age of 23.

In 2016, the maximum age limits for the list (45, or 38 for first-time listees) was dropped. FIFA reserves the right to require referees over the age of 45 to undergo additional technical assessments as well as specific medical examinations and fitness testing on a case-by-case basis.

Sarkis Demirdjian was the longest serving FIFA-listed referee, being listed for 20 years and 10 months (September 1962 – July 1983).
