= Peter Gans =

Dutch football referee (born 1937)

Peter Gans (born 1937 in Noordwijk) is a retired Dutch football referee. He was a referee in several Eredivisie matches from 1975 to 1983, where he stopped at 43 years of age.

== See also ==
- List of FIFA international referees
