= Ivan Bebek =

Croatian football referee

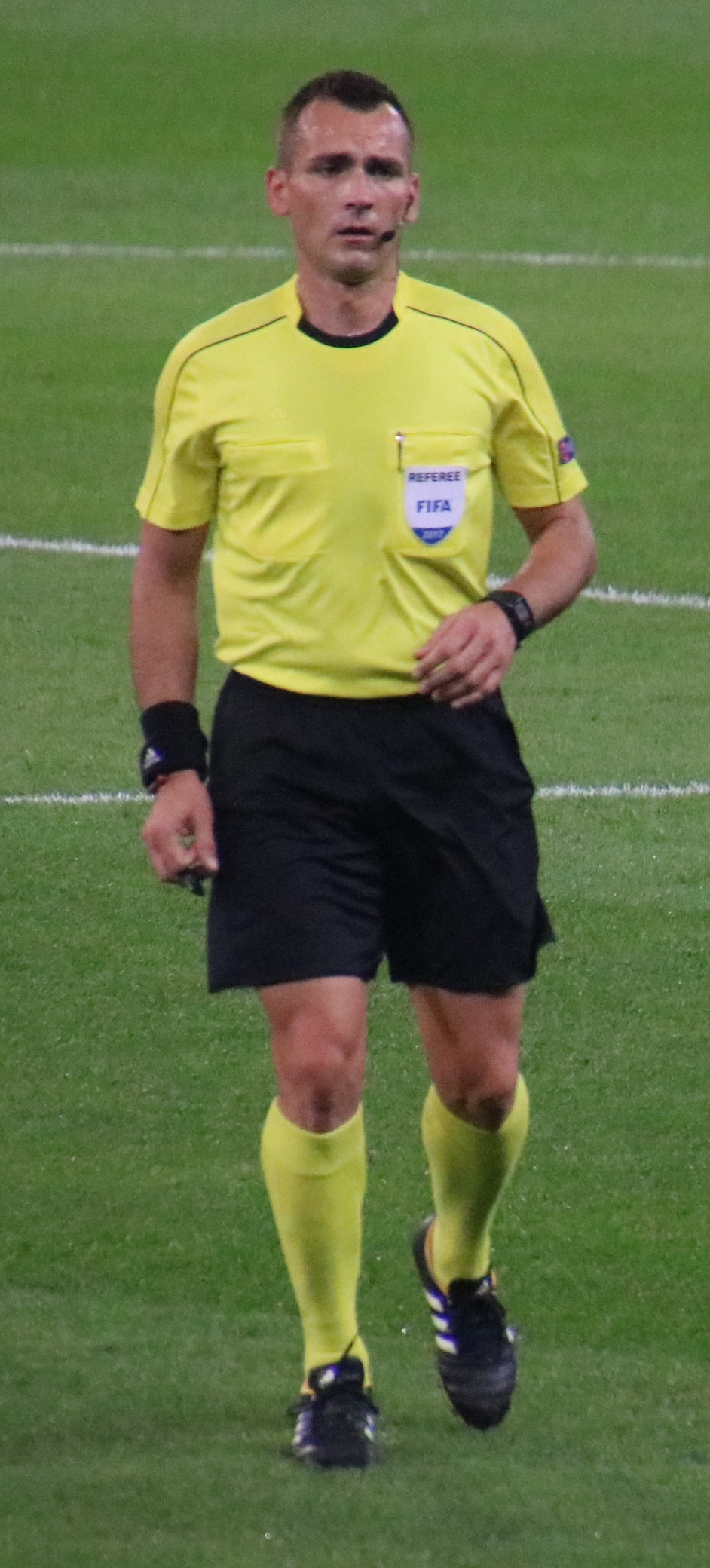
- Bebek in 2017
- Full name: Ivan Bebek
- Born: 30 May 1977 (age 49); Rijeka, SR Croatia, Yugoslavia

Domestic
Years	League	Role

International
Years	League	Role
2003–	FIFA listed	Referee

Ivan Bebek (born 30 May 1977) is a Croatian football referee.

Bebek is the only Croatian referee to have supervised three UEFA Champions League group stage matches (Lazio v. Werder Bremen during the 2007–08 season, Bordeaux v. CFR Cluj in the 2008–09 season and Copenhagen v. Juventus during the 2013–14 season). He also refereed at the 2013–14 UEFA Champions League knockout stage (Paris Saint-Germain v. Bayer Leverkusen).

He has refereed at the 2007 FIFA U-17 World Cup. He was also a fourth official at UEFA Euro 2008. He refereed at the 2009 FIFA U-20 World Cup and invited to Indian League.

He was preselected as a referee for the 2010 FIFA World Cup.

He is preselected as a referee for the 2026 FIFA World Cup.

== Controversies and Career Incidents ==
Ivan Bebek has faced several controversies during his refereeing career. On 17 March 2016, he officiated the 2015–16 UEFA Europa League match between SC Braga and Fenerbahçe at the Braga Municipal Stadium. Bebek was criticized for issuing three red cards and eight yellow cards to Fenerbahçe, with the match ending 4–1 in favor of Braga. Following the game, Fenerbahçe alleged “bet manipulation” and requested UEFA to investigate Bebek’s phone records and assets. After reviewing the complaint, the UEFA Referees Committee demoted him from the elite referee group to the first category on 12 June 2016.

On 7 October 2021, the Disciplinary Commission of the Croatian Football Federation suspended Bebek for four months after leaked conversations showed him insulting Hajduk Split fans while speaking with Croatian journalist Blaž Duplančić.

Later, on 1 November 2022, Bebek was initially appointed as the fourth official for the UEFA Europa League group-stage match between Dinamo Kyiv and Fenerbahçe, scheduled in Kraków, Poland. Hours after the announcement, he was replaced by Croatian referee Marin Vidulin, with no official explanation provided.

== See also ==
- List of football referees
