= Tom Delahunty =

British-New Zealand association football referee

- Full name: Thomas Gee Delahunty
- Born: 28 July 1935; Withington, Manchester, England
- Died: 14 October 2018 (aged 83); Waikanae, New Zealand

Domestic
Years	League	Role
1970–1984	New Zealand National Soccer League	Referee

International
Years	League	Role
1968–1984	FIFA listed	Referee

Thomas Gee Delahunty (28 July 1935 – 14 October 2018) was a British-born New Zealand association football (soccer) referee, who was a FIFA referee from 1968–1984.

== Early life ==
Delahunty was born on 28 July 1935 in Withington, Manchester, England. He initially played football (soccer) as a goalkeeper, but stopped after dislocating his fingers aged 14. At the age of 20, Delahunty moved to New Zealand, and he became a naturalised New Zealand citizen in 1981.

== Career ==
Delahunty decided to take up refereeing aged 18. He worked for two years in Manchester, and continued after moving to New Zealand. From 1968 until 1984, Delahunty was a FIFA international referee. In total, he refereed 19 international matches, including a number of New Zealand home internationals during the 1970s. From 1970, Delahunty worked as a referee for the newly formed New Zealand National Soccer League, and also refereed two Chatham Cup finals. Delahunty retired from refereeing in 1984.

In 1999, Delahunty was inducted into the New Zealand Soccer Hall of Fame.

== Death ==
Delahunty died in a nursing home in Waikanae on 14 October 2018.
