= Daniel Nkata =

Ugandan FIFA association football referee

Late Daniel Nkata
- Born: Daniel Nkata; 1932
- Died: 2004 (aged 71–72); Kawempe in Kampala
- Other names: Dan Nkata, Danny Nkata
- Education: Kings College Buddo
- Alma mater: Makerere College School
- Occupations: Secretary of Uganda Football Association, Secretary of the Uganda Golf Union
- Known for: First Ugandan to receive a FIFA badge, golf, writer, archivist
- Spouse: Victoria Namutebi Nkata (1961-2004)
- Children: 6
- Father: Tera Womeraka
Daniel Nkata
Domestic
Years	League	Role
1951–1966	Uganda Premier League	Referee
International
Years	League	Role
1957-1966	CAF	Referee
1960–1966	FIFA	Referee

Daniel Nkata (born 1932, also known as Dan Nkata, Danny Nkata) was the first Ugandan FIFA association football referee in 1960, writer, archivist. He was among the first Ugandans to play golf after the late Sir Daudi Chwa (the Ssekabaka of Buganda). He also served as secretary of Uganda Football Association which is nowadays known as FUFA. Nkata was the first indigenous Ugandan to gain formal membership of a golf club. He was secretary of the Uganda Golf Union in 1980.

== Personal life and education ==
Nkata was born to Tera Womeraka, a former welfare officer with the Uganda Cranes in the late 1940s and early 1950s. Nkata studied from Kings College Buddo, Makerere College School.

Nkata was married to the late Victoria Namutebi Nkata (born 1927-11-9, died on 2021-02-20) who was the pioneer indigenous Ugandan golfer, The two got married in 1961 and they birthed four kids together(who include Ian Nkata, David Sseppuunya, Suzan Nkata Mubiru).

Nkata was an honorary Scotsman. He was a member of the Church of Scotland (Presbyterian Church) and also a collector of both the Presbyterian choral worship and Scottish traditional music.

He assisted his wife Victoria Nkata in securing a scholarship to study in Scotland at Moray House College of Education, University of Edinburgh from 1966 to 1968, a place where Victoria Nkata learned to play golf and she became the first Ugandan woman to play golf when she returned to Uganda in 1968.

Nkata died in 2004 in Kawempe in Kampala Uganda

== Career ==
Nkata was a former Entebbe club captain. He also served as secretary of Uganda Football Association(UFA).

Nkata begun his refereeing in the 1950s, and he was a member of the Uganda Football Referees Association (UFRA). Nkata got promoted to Grade 1 Referee in December 1951. Nkata received sports administration and coaching scholarship together with the late Polycarp Kakooza, from the British colonial sports administrators to study in London at Lilleshall National Sports Centre in Bisham Abbey United Kingdom. He also went for a FIFA Referees/Instructors course at Ecole Internationale de Sports in Macolin in Switzerland and from where he received his FIFA referee badge in 1960 upon completion and that made him the first Black African south of the Sahara to get the FIFA referee badge.

Nkata officiated between Uganda vs Ethiopia at the Olympic qualifier match at Nakivubo Stadium on 1959-12-13. He was the central referee at the final match of Uganda vs Ghana, a match that Ghana won. Other matches he officiated included; the 1961 Africa Cup of Nations Qualifiers match of Madagascar vs. Ethiopia in Antananarivo, Madagascar, 1960 Olympic Qualifiers match between Sudan and Ethiopia on both 1959-11-23 in Khartoum and also on the 1959-12-20 in Addis Ababa.

Nkata trained, mentored and coached other football referees who included Edward Bukenya and Kizito Mubanda before he retired his football activities in 1966 to become a writer and archivist for Uganda football history in the 1980s. He wrote two columns titled "Flashback" and "Stars of the Past" for the defunct soccer world magazine Nkata profiled many people in his "Stars of the Past" column which include; Edward Muteesa, Samson Kisekka, George Kamba, Jimmy Sewava, Naphtali Musoke, Stephen Ibale, "Jogo" Adema, Ernest Lugolobi, Kefa Kiwanuka, Sam Baker Kasigwa and Manasseh Owiny.

Nkata did his golf training at the Kampala Technical School from 1951 to 1953. In June 1964, Nkata become the first indigenous Ugandan to gain formal membership of a golf club in a sport. And in 1980, Nkata attended the World Golf Congress with his friend Engineer Zak Muwanga where he played for St. Andrew's, the home of golf, in Scotland. Nkata was secretary of the Uganda Golf Union (UGU) and Muwanga serving as chairman in 1980.

Nkata has a golf tournament named after him that is "Dan Nkata memorial tournament", which started in 2006. Nkata is known for re-designing the Entebbe Golf Course from 9 hole to 18 hole facility, the 18 hole number is named Danny Nkata Munyigwawabiri in appreciation of his effort.

He also played tennis.

== See also ==
- FUFA
- Ivan Eklind
- The Uganda Cranes
