= Rachel Woo =

American soccer referee (born 1970)

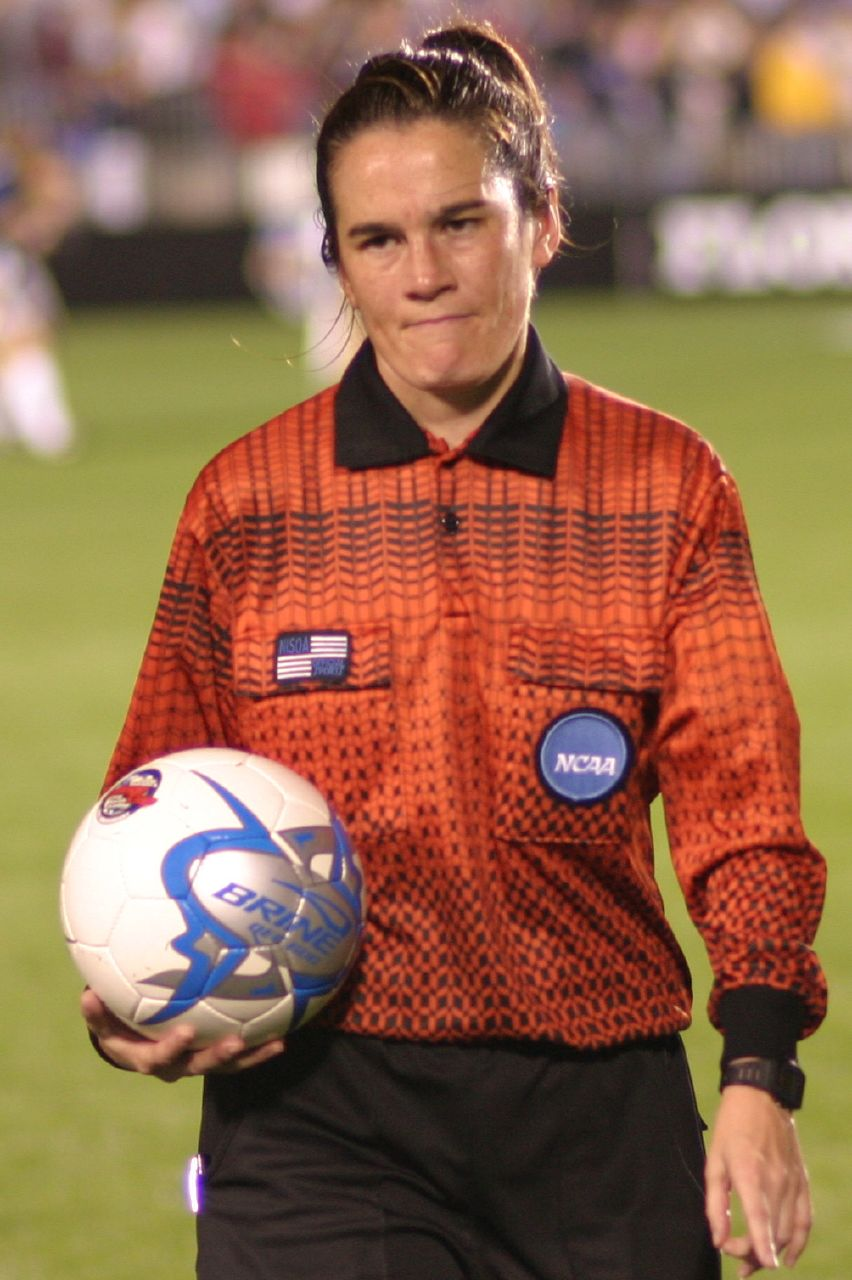
- Woo at the 2006 College Cup
- Full name: Rachel Woo
- Born: 1970

Domestic
Years	League	

International
Years	League	Role
2001-2007	FIFA	Referee

Rachel Woo was an American soccer referee. She refereed at the 2003 FIFA Women's World Cup.

== Career ==
Rachel Woo first became a referee in 1993. When the professional women's league, WUSA started, Woo was one of the officials who debuted in the league. In 2001, she became one of four American women to receive a FIFA badge.

As an international referee, Woo worked the 2002 Women's CONCACAF Gold Cup. Then, in 2003 she was selected to referee at the 2003 Women's World Cup in the United States.

Rachel Woo also officiated many college games in the United States. She refereed 18 College Cups, and was inducted into the NISOA Hall of Fame.

Woo continues to serve the college game by working as the coordinator of officials for several conferences.
