= Milagros Carmona =

Dominican Republic football referee (born 1983

Milagros Leonardo Carmona (born November 21, 1983) is a Dominican Republic Association football referee and former footballer.

== Early life ==
Carmona played for the Dominican Republic women's national football team and retired due to injury in 2004.

== Career ==
Carmona was described as "surprised the team leadership with her ability... considered... to be a young woman who has a great future in international arbitration". She attended referee courses in Portugal. She refereed 012 Summer Olympics – Women's qualification matches.

== Personal life ==
She is a native of San Cristóbal, Dominican Republic. She has a child.
