= Colin Cooke =

Australian cricketer

Personal information
- Born: 21 November 1947 (age 78); Harrisville, Queensland, Australia
- Source: Cricinfo, 1 October 2020

Colin Cooke (born 21 November 1947) is an Australian cricketer who was a pace bowler. He played in five first-class matches for Queensland in 1977.

== Cricket career ==
Cooke began his cricket career in Ipswich first representing the Ipswich team in 1963 when he was just fifteen. He later played for Valley in Brisbane Grade Cricket and was a member of their 1972-73 and 1973-74 One-Day premiership sides and 1974-75 First-grade premiership side. He played 145 games for the club taking 328 wickets at an average of 20.57 in total.

Cooke made his First-class debut for Queensland in January 1977 and took 4 for 59 despite bowling with an injured ankle. He played in five matches total in the 1976-77 season taking 17 wickets at an average of 30.35 and scoring just 2 runs at an average of 0.66, and in the 1977-78 season he played one List-A game in which he did not take any wickets or score any runs which was his last time representing Queensland.

Cooke has remained an active cricketer into later life and in 2011 he was selected in the first Australian Over-60s squad to tour the UK playing two Over-60s "Test" matches against England and one against Wales. In 2018 he represented Australia in an Over-70s series against England which Australia won.

== See also ==
- List of Queensland first-class cricketers
