= Ingrida Siliūnienė =

Lithuanian football referee

Ingrida Siliūnienė is a Lithuanian Association football referee and former footballer.

== Early life ==
Siliūnienė is a native of Kaunas, Lithuania.

== Playing career ==
Siliūnienė played in the Lithuania women's national football team's first win, a 3–2 win over Estonia in 1997.

== Referee career ==
Siliūnienė refereed in the Europa League. She has worked as member of the executive committee of the Lithuanian Football Federation.

== Personal life ==
Siliūnienė has two daughters. She has worked as a physical education teacher.
