= Khosrowabad =

Khosrowabad (Persian: خسرو آباد), also rendered as Khusrauabad or Khosroabad, may refer to the following places in Iran:

== Alborz Province ==
- Khosrowabad, Alborz

== Chaharmahal and Bakhtiari Province ==
- Khosrowabad, Kuhrang, a village in Kuhrang County
- Khosrowabad, Lordegan, a village in Lordegan County

== Fars Province ==
- Khosrowabad, Kazerun, a village in Kazerun County
- Khosrowabad, Shiraz, a village in Shiraz County

== Gilan Province ==
- Khosrowabad, Gilan, a village in Fuman County

== Hamadan Province ==
- Khosrowabad, Hamadan, a village in Asadabad County

== Isfahan Province ==
- Khosrowabad, Fereydunshahr, a village in Fereydunshahr County
- Khosrowabad, Shahin Shahr and Meymeh, a village in Shahin Shahr and Meymeh County

== Kerman Province ==
- Khosrowabad, Arzuiyeh, a village in Arzuiyeh County
- Khosrowabad, Manujan, a village in Manujan County

== Kermanshah Province ==
- Khosrowabad, Kermanshah, a village in Dalahu County
- Khosrowabad-e Amjadi, a village in Sonqor County
- Khosrowabad-e Faleh Gori, a village in Sonqor County

== Kurdistan Province ==
- Khosrowabad, Kurdistan, a village in Bijar County
- Khosrowabad Rural District, in Bijar County

== Lorestan Province ==
- Khosrowabad, Dorud
- Khosrowabad, Kuhdasht
- Khosrowabad (33°47′ N 48°16′ E), Selseleh

== Qazvin Province ==
- Khosrowabad, Qazvin

== Razavi Khorasan Province ==
- Khosrowabad, Davarzan, a village in Davarzan County
- Khosrowabad, Nishapur, a village in Nishapur County
- Khosrowabad, Tabas, a village in Tabas County

== Sistan and Baluchestan Province ==
- Khosrowabad, Sistan and Baluchestan

== South Khorasan Province ==
- Khosrowabad, Darmian, a village in Darmian County
- Khosrowabad, Nehbandan, a village in Nehbandan County
- Khosrowabad Bala, a village in Nehbandan County

== Tehran Province ==
- Khosrowabad, Tehran

== West Azerbaijan Province ==
- Khosrowabad, West Azerbaijan, a village in Salmas County

== Yazd Province ==
- Khosrowabad, Abarkuh, a village in Abarkuh County
