= Gasht =

Gasht or Gosht or Gesht (Persian: گشت) may refer to:

- Gasht, Gilan, Iran
- Gasht-e Gurab, Gilan Province, Iran
- Gasht-e Rudkhan, Gilan Province, Iran
- Gosht, Iran
- Gasht Rural District (disambiguation)
- Gasht, Khyber Pakhtunkhwa, a town in Pakistan
