= Vazirabad =

Vazirabad or Wazirabad (Persian: وزيرآباد) may refer to the following places:

== Afghanistan ==
- Vazirabad, Afghanistan, Balkh Province
- Wazirabad, Kabul, a neighborhood of Kabul

== India ==
- Wazirabad, Delhi
- Wazirabad, Gurgaon

== Iran ==
- Vazirabad, Fars
- Vazirabad, Ilam
- Vazirabad, Isfahan
- Vazirabad, Lorestan
- Vazirabad, Markazi
- Vazirabad, West Azerbaijan

== Pakistan ==
- Wazirabad, Punjab
  - Wazirabad District
  - Wazirabad Tehsil

== Other uses ==
- Vazirabad (horse)

== See also ==
- Waziristan
