= Mir Mahalleh =

Mir Mahalleh (Persian: ميرمحله) may refer to:

- Mir Mahalleh, Fuman, Gilan Province
- Mir Mahalleh, alternate name of Maaf Mahalleh, Fuman County, Gilan Province
- Mir Mahalleh, Masal, Gilan Province
- Mir Mahalleh, Shanderman, Masal County, Gilan Province
- Mir Mahalleh, Shaft, Gilan Province
- Mir Mahalleh, Golestan
