= Mudegan =

Mudegan مودگان
- Village
- Location within Iran
- Coordinates: 37°10′35″N 49°14′58″E
- Country: Iran
- Province: Gilan
- County: Fuman
- Bakhsh: Central
- Rural District: Gasht

Population (2006)
  - Total: 381
- Time zone: UTC+3:30 (IRST)
  - Summer (DST): UTC+4:30 (IRDT)

Mudegan (Persian: مودگان, also Romanized as Mūdegān) is a village in Gasht Rural District, in the Central District of Fuman County, Gilan Province, Iran. At the 2006 census, its population was 381, in 105 families.
