= Sestelan =

Sestelan سسطلان
- Village
- Location within Iran
- Coordinates: 37°09′16″N 49°17′56″E
- Country: Iran
- Province: Gilan
- County: Fuman
- Bakhsh: Central
- Rural District: Gurab Pas

Population (2006)
  - Total: 301
- Time zone: UTC+3:30 (IRST)
  - Summer (DST): UTC+4:30 (IRDT)

Sestelan (Persian: سسطلان, also Romanized as Sesţelān) is a village in Gurab Pas Rural District, in the Central District of Fuman County, Gilan Province, Iran. At the 2006 census, its population was 301, in 72 families.
