= Shelkeh Banan =

Shelkeh Banan شلكه بانان
- Village
- Location within Iran
- Coordinates: 37°13′23″N 49°16′24″E
- Country: Iran
- Province: Gilan
- County: Fuman
- Bakhsh: Central
- Rural District: Gasht

Population (2006)
  - Total: 310
- Time zone: UTC+3:30 (IRST)
  - Summer (DST): UTC+4:30 (IRDT)

Shelkeh Banan (Persian: شلكه بانان, also Romanized as Shelkeh Bānān; also known as Shakbānān and Shelekbānān) is a village in Gasht Rural District, in the Central District of Fuman County, Gilan Province, Iran. At the 2006 census, its population was 310, in 88 families.
