= Kelfat =

Kelfat كلفت
- Village
- Location within Iran
- Coordinates: 37°10′18″N 49°19′23″E
- Country: Iran
- Province: Gilan
- County: Fuman
- Bakhsh: Central
- Rural District: Gurab Pas

Population (2006)
  - Total: 544
- Time zone: UTC+3:30 (IRST)
  - Summer (DST): UTC+4:30 (IRDT)

Kelfat (Persian: كلفت, also Romanized as Kolfat; also known as Kal’fet) is a village in Gurab Pas Rural District, in the Central District of Fuman County, Gilan Province, Iran. At the 2006 census, its population was 544, in 154 families.
