= Rudbar Chireh =

Rudbar Chireh رودبارچيره
- Village
- Location within Iran
- Coordinates: 37°10′18″N 49°18′03″E
- Country: Iran
- Province: Gilan
- County: Fuman
- Bakhsh: Central
- Rural District: Gasht

Population (2006)
  - Total: 484
- Time zone: UTC+3:30 (IRST)
  - Summer (DST): UTC+4:30 (IRDT)

Rudbar Chireh (Persian: رودبارچيره, also Romanized as Rūdbār Chīreh) is a village located in Gasht Rural District, in the Central District of Fuman County, Gilan Province, Iran. At the 2006 census, its population was 484, in 121 families.
