= Now Gurab =

Now Gurab نوگوراب
- Village
- Location within Iran
- Coordinates: 37°13′00″N 49°17′45″E
- Country: Iran
- Province: Gilan
- County: Fuman
- Bakhsh: Central
- Rural District: Gasht

Population (2006)
  - Total: 449
- Time zone: UTC+3:30 (IRST)
  - Summer (DST): UTC+4:30 (IRDT)

Now Gurab (Persian: نوگوراب, also Romanized as Now Gūrāb and Nau Gurāb; also known as Nukurab) is a village in Gasht Rural District, in the Central District of Fuman County, Gilan Province, Iran. At the 2006 census, its population was 449, in 119 families.
