= Hoseyn Kuh =

Hoseyn Kuh حسين كوه
- Village
- Location within Iran
- Coordinates: 37°11′45″N 49°13′39″E
- Country: Iran
- Province: Gilan
- County: Fuman
- Bakhsh: Central
- Rural District: Gasht

Population (2006)
  - Total: 631
- Time zone: UTC+3:30 (IRST)
  - Summer (DST): UTC+4:30 (IRDT)

Hoseyn Kuh (Persian: حسين كوه, also Romanized as Ḩoseyn Kūh) is a village in Gasht Rural District, in the Central District of Fuman County, Gilan Province, Iran. At the 2006 census, its population was 631, in 158 families.
