= Lelekam =

Lelekam للكام
- Village
- Location within Iran
- Coordinates: 37°11′56″N 49°18′18″E
- Country: Iran
- Province: Gilan
- County: Fuman
- Bakhsh: Central
- Rural District: Gasht

Population (2006)
  - Total: 591
- Time zone: UTC+3:30 (IRST)
  - Summer (DST): UTC+4:30 (IRDT)

Lelekam (Persian: للكام, also Romanized as Lelekām) is a village in Gasht Rural District, in the Central District of Fuman County, Gilan Province, Iran. At the 2006 census, its population was 591, in 157 families.
