= Emamzadeh Taqi =

Emamzadeh Taqi امامزاده تقي
- Village
- Location within Iran
- Coordinates: 37°10′07″N 49°16′04″E
- Country: Iran
- Province: Gilan
- County: Fuman
- Bakhsh: Central
- Rural District: Gasht

Population (2006)
  - Total: 450
- Time zone: UTC+3:30 (IRST)
  - Summer (DST): UTC+4:30 (IRDT)

Emamzadeh Taqi (Persian: امامزاده تقي, also Romanized as Emāmzādeh Taqī and Emāmzādehtaqī) is a village in Gasht Rural District, in the Central District of Fuman County, Gilan Province, Iran. At the 2006 census, its population was 450, in 119 families.
