= Siah Piran =

Siah Piran (Persian: سياه پيران) may refer to:

- Siah Piran-e Kashani
- Siah Piran-e Kasmai
