= Khalil Sara =

Khalil Sara خليل سرا
- Village
- Location within Iran
- Coordinates: 37°13′22″N 49°15′12″E
- Country: Iran
- Province: Gilan
- County: Fuman
- Bakhsh: Central
- Rural District: Gasht

Population (2006)
  - Total: 367
- Time zone: UTC+3:30 (IRST)
  - Summer (DST): UTC+4:30 (IRDT)

Khalil Sara (Persian: خليل سرا, also Romanized as Khalīl Sarā) is a village in Gasht Rural District, in the Central District of Fuman County, Gilan Province, Iran. At the 2006 census, its population was 367, in 99 families.
