= Palang Kol =

Palang Kol پلنگ كل
- Village
- Location within Iran
- Coordinates: 37°12′35″N 49°17′36″E
- Country: Iran
- Province: Gilan
- County: Fuman
- Bakhsh: Central
- Rural District: Gasht

Population (2006)
  - Total: 156
- Time zone: UTC+3:30 (IRST)
  - Summer (DST): UTC+4:30 (IRDT)

Palang Kol (Persian: پلنگ كل) is a village in Gasht Rural District, in the Central District of Fuman County, Gilan Province, Iran. At the 2006 census, its population was 156, in 41 families.
