= Kish-e Rudbar =

Kish-e Rudbar كيش رودبار
- Village
- Location within Iran
- Coordinates: 37°09′11″N 49°15′51″E
- Country: Iran
- Province: Gilan
- County: Fuman
- Bakhsh: Central
- Rural District: Gurab Pas

Population (2006)
  - Total: 492
- Time zone: UTC+3:30 (IRST)
  - Summer (DST): UTC+4:30 (IRDT)

Kish-e Rudbar (Persian: كيش رودبار, also Romanized as Kīsh-e Rūdbār; also known as Kīsheh Rūdbār) is a village in Gurab Pas Rural District, in the Central District of Fuman County, Gilan Province, Iran. At the 2006 census, its population was 492, in 122 families.
