= Taleh Gongah =

Taleh Gongah تله گنگاه
- Village
- Location within Iran
- Coordinates: 37°08′13″N 49°14′27″E
- Country: Iran
- Province: Gilan
- County: Fuman
- Bakhsh: Central
- Rural District: Gurab Pas

Population (2006)
  - Total: 151
- Time zone: UTC+3:30 (IRST)
  - Summer (DST): UTC+4:30 (IRDT)

Taleh Gongah (Persian: تله گنگاه, also Romanized as Taleh Gongāh; also known as Taleh Kangān and Taleh Kongāh) is a village in Gurab Pas Rural District, in the Central District of Fuman County, Gilan Province, Iran. At the 2006 census, its population was 151, in 39 families.
