= Hallaj Mahalleh =

Hallaj Mahalleh حلاج محله
- Village
- Location within Iran
- Coordinates: 37°07′58″N 49°16′57″E
- Country: Iran
- Province: Gilan
- County: Fuman
- Bakhsh: Central
- Rural District: Gurab Pas

Population (2006)
  - Total: 120
- Time zone: UTC+3:30 (IRST)
  - Summer (DST): UTC+4:30 (IRDT)

Hallaj Mahalleh (Persian: حلاج محله, also Romanized as Ḩallāj Maḩalleh) is a village in Gurab Pas Rural District, in the Central District of Fuman County, Gilan Province, Iran. At the 2006 census, its population was 120, in 31 families.
