= Khoshknudhan =

Khoshknudhan or Khoshk Nowdahan or Khoshk Nowdehan or Khoshknowdehan (Persian: خشكنودهان) may refer to:

- Khoshknudhan-e Bala
- Khoshknudhan-e Pain
