= Nasrollah Mahalleh =

Nasrollah Mahalleh نصرالله محله
- Village
- Location within Iran
- Coordinates: 37°10′45″N 49°18′13″E
- Country: Iran
- Province: Gilan
- County: Fuman
- Bakhsh: Central
- Rural District: Gasht

Population (2006)
  - Total: 483
- Time zone: UTC+3:30 (IRST)
  - Summer (DST): UTC+4:30 (IRDT)

Nasrollah Mahalleh (Persian: نصرالله محله, also Romanized as Naşrollāh Maḩalleh; also known as Naşrollāh Khān Maḩalleh) is a village in Gasht Rural District, in the Central District of Fuman County, Gilan Province, Iran. At the 2006 census, its population was 483, in 118 families.
