= Halqeh Basteh =

Halqeh Basteh حلقه بسته
- Village
- Location within Iran
- Coordinates: 37°10′10″N 49°21′07″E
- Country: Iran
- Province: Gilan
- County: Fuman
- Bakhsh: Central
- Rural District: Gasht

Population (2006)
  - Total: 98
- Time zone: UTC+3:30 (IRST)
  - Summer (DST): UTC+4:30 (IRDT)

Halqeh Basteh (Persian: حلقه بسته, also Romanized as Ḩalqeh Basteh) is a village in Gasht Rural District, in the Central District of Fuman County, Gilan Province, Iran. Comprising families, its population was 98 as of the 2006 census.
