= Shekal Gurab =

Shekal Gurab or Shakalgurab (Persian: شكال گوراب), also rendered as Shaghal Gurab or Shigal Gurab or Shikil-Kirab, may refer to:

- Shekal Gurab-e Bala
- Shekal Gurab-e Pain
