= Khusruabad =

Khusruabad (Persian: خوسرواباد) may refer to:

- Khusruabad, Gilan
- Khusruabad, Hamadan
- Khusruabad, Kermanshah
- Khusruabad, Kurdistan
