= Seyyed Sara =

Seyyed Sara سيدسرا
- Village
- Location within Iran
- Coordinates: 37°08′11″N 49°15′07″E
- Country: Iran
- Province: Gilan
- County: Fuman
- Bakhsh: Central
- Rural District: Gurab Pas

Population (2006)
  - Total: 522
- Time zone: UTC+3:30 (IRST)
  - Summer (DST): UTC+4:30 (IRDT)

Seyyed Sara (Persian: سيدسرا, also Romanized as Seyyed Sarā; also known as Sa‘īd Sarā) is a village in Gurab Pas Rural District, in the Central District of Fuman County, Gilan Province, Iran. At the 2006 census, its population was 522, in 118 families.
