= Shekal Gurab-e Pain =

Shekal Gurab-e Pain شكال گوراب پايين
- Village
- Location within Iran
- Coordinates: 37°12′16″N 49°17′32″E
- Country: Iran
- Province: Gilan
- County: Fuman
- Bakhsh: Central
- Rural District: Gasht

Population (2006)
  - Total: 827
- Time zone: UTC+3:30 (IRST)
  - Summer (DST): UTC+4:30 (IRDT)

Shekal Gurab-e Pain (Persian: شكال گوراب پايين, also Romanized as Shekāl Gūrāb-e Pā’īn; also known as Shakālgūrāb) is a village in Gasht Rural District, in the Central District of Fuman County, Gilan Province, Iran. At the 2006 census, its population was 827, in 208 families.
