= Shulam =

Village in Gilan province, Iran

Shulam Persian: شولم
- Village
- Location within Iran
- Coordinates: 37°10′13″N 49°13′28″E
- Country: Iran
- Province: Gilan
- County: Fuman
- District: Central
- Rural District: Gasht

Population (2016)
  - Total: 903
- Time zone: UTC+3:30 (IRST)

Shulam (Persian: شولم) (Note: Also romanized as Shūlam; also known as Shulen) is a village in Gasht Rural District of the Central District in Fuman County, Gilan province, Iran.

== Demographics ==
=== Population ===
At the time of the 2006 National Census, the village's population was 1,270 in 361 households. The following census in 2011 counted 1,088 people in 326 households. The 2016 census measured the population of the village as 903 people in 331 households.
