= Qassabali Sara =

Qassabali Sara قصابعلی سرا
- Village
- Location within Iran
- Coordinates: 37°13′54″N 49°15′53″E
- Country: Iran
- Province: Gilan
- County: Fuman
- Bakhsh: Central
- Rural District: Lulaman

Population (2016)
  - Total: 219
- Time zone: UTC+3:30 (IRST)

Qassabali Sara (Persian: قصابعلی سرا, also Romanized as Qaşşāb‘alī Sarā) is a village in Lulaman Rural District, in the Central District of Fuman County, Gilan Province, Iran.

At the time of the 2006 National Census, the village's population was 347 in 91 households. The following census in 2011 counted 274 people in 75 households. The 2016 census measured the population of the village as 219 people in 69 households.
