= Rud Pish =

Village in Gilan province, Iran

Rud Pish Persian: رودپيش
- Village
- Location within Iran
- Coordinates: 37°14′00″N 49°23′14″E
- Country: Iran
- Province: Gilan
- County: Fuman
- District: Central
- Rural District: Rud Pish

Population (2016)
  - Total: 2,140
- Time zone: UTC+3:30 (IRST)

Rud Pish (Persian: رودپيش) (Note: Also romanized as Rūd Pīsh) is a village in, and the capital of, Rud Pish Rural District in the Central District of Fuman County, Gilan province, Iran.

== Demographics ==
=== Population ===
At the time of the 2006 National Census, the village's population was 2,274 in 588 households. The following census in 2011 counted 2,329 people in 682 households. The 2016 census measured the population of the village as 2,140 people in 721 households. It was the most populous village in its rural district.
