= Heydar Alat =

Village in Gilan province, Iran

Qaleh Heydar Alat Persian: حيدرالات
- Village
- Location within Iran
- Coordinates: 37°06′11″N 49°15′55″E
- Country: Iran
- Province: Gilan
- County: Fuman
- District: Central
- Rural District: Gurab Pas

Population (2016)
  - Total: 666
- Time zone: UTC+3:30 (IRST)

Heydar Alat (Persian: حيدرالات) (Note: Also romanized as Ḩeydar Ālāt) is a village in Gurab Pas Rural District of the Central District in Fuman County, Gilan province, Iran.

== Demographics ==
=== Population ===
At the time of the 2006 National Census, the village's population was 716 in 173 households. The following census in 2011 counted 669 people in 209 households. The 2016 census measured the population of the village as 666 people in 217 households.
