= Fusheh =

Village in Gilan province, Iran

Fusheh Persian: فوشه
- Village
- Location within Iran
- Coordinates: 37°06′04″N 49°13′22″E
- Country: Iran
- Province: Gilan
- County: Fuman
- District: Central
- Rural District: Gurab Pas

Population (2016)
  - Total: 597
- Time zone: UTC+3:30 (IRST)

Fusheh (Persian: فوشه) (Note: Also romanized as Fūsheh) is a village in Gurab Pas Rural District of the Central District in Fuman County, Gilan province, Iran.

== Demographics ==
=== Population ===
At the time of the 2006 National Census, the village's population was 755 in 212 households. The following census in 2011 counted 683 people in 201 households. The 2016 census measured the population of the village as 597 people in 198 households.
