= Kord Mahalleh, Fuman =

Village in Gilan province, Iran

Kord Mahalleh Persian: كردمحله
- Village
- Location within Iran
- Coordinates: 37°10′08″N 49°16′57″E
- Country: Iran
- Province: Gilan
- County: Fuman
- District: Central
- Rural District: Gasht

Population (2016)
  - Total: 1,945
- Time zone: UTC+3:30 (IRST)

Kord Mahalleh (Persian: كردمحله) (Note: Also romanized as Kord Maḩalleh) is a village in Gasht Rural District of the Central District in Fuman County, Gilan province, Iran.

== Demographics ==
=== Population ===
At the time of the 2006 National Census, the village's population was 2,182 in 570 households. The following census in 2011 counted 2,155 people in 662 households. The 2016 census measured the population of the village as 1,945 people in 662 households. It was the most populous village in its rural district.
