= Qaleh Rudkhan =

Village in Gilan province, Iran

Qaleh Rudkhan Persian: قلعه رودخان
- Village
- Location within Iran
- Coordinates: 37°06′25″N 49°16′30″E
- Country: Iran
- Province: Gilan
- County: Fuman
- District: Central
- Rural District: Gurab Pas

Population (2016)
  - Total: 538
- Time zone: UTC+3:30 (IRST)

Qaleh Rudkhan (Persian: قلعه رودخان) (Note: Also romanized as Qal‘eh Rūdkhān and Qal‘eh-ye Rūdkhān; also known as Kala-Rudkhan and Qala Rūdkhan) is a village in Gurab Pas Rural District of the Central District in Fuman County, Gilan province, Iran.

== Demographics ==
=== Population ===
At the time of the 2006 National Census, the village's population was 707 in 217 households. The following census in 2011 counted 610 people in 199 households. The 2016 census measured the population of the village as 538 people in 195 households.
