= Baghbanan =

Village in Gilan province, Iran

Baghbanan Persian: باغبانان
- Village
- Location within Iran
- Coordinates: 37°14′10″N 49°15′21″E
- Country: Iran
- Province: Gilan
- County: Fuman
- District: Central
- Rural District: Lulaman

Population (2016)
  - Total: 642
- Time zone: UTC+3:30 (IRST)

Baghbanan (Persian: باغبانان) (Note: Also romanized as Bāghbānān) is a village in Lulaman Rural District of the Central District in Fuman County, Gilan province, Iran.

== Demographics ==
=== Population ===
At the time of the 2006 National Census, the village's population was 913 in 214 households. The following census in 2011 counted 865 people in 248 households. The 2016 census measured the population of the village as 642 people in 219 households.
