= Shanbeh Bazar =

Village in Gilan province, Iran

Shanbeh Bazar Persian: شنبه بازار
- Village
- Location within Iran
- Coordinates: 37°14′57″N 49°16′54″E
- Country: Iran
- Province: Gilan
- County: Fuman
- District: Central
- Rural District: Lulaman

Population (2016)
  - Total: 609
- Time zone: UTC+3:30 (IRST)

Shanbeh Bazar (Persian: شنبه بازار) (Note: Also romanized as Shanbeh Bāzār; also known as Sabzqabā) is a village in Lulaman Rural District of the Central District in Fuman County, Gilan province, Iran.

== Demographics ==
=== Population ===
At the time of the 2006 National Census, the village's population was 697 in 188 households. The following census in 2011 counted 894 people in 275 households. The 2016 census measured the population of the village as 609 people in 224 households.
