= Sang Bijar =

Village in Gilan province, Iran

Sang Bijar Persian: سنگ بيجار
- Village
- Location within Iran
- Country: Iran
- Province: Gilan
- County: Fuman
- District: Central
- Rural District: Rud Pish

Population (2016)
  - Total: 660
- Time zone: UTC+3:30 (IRST)

Sang Bijar (Persian: سنگ بيجار) (Note: Also romanized as Sang Bījār; also known as Sang Bejār, Sangabadzhar, and Sangabajar) is a village in Rud Pish Rural District of the Central District in Fuman County, Gilan province, Iran.

== Demographics ==
=== Population ===
At the time of the 2006 National Census, the village's population was 805 in 212 households. The following census in 2011 counted 540 people in 165 households. The 2016 census measured the population of the village as 660 people in 224 households.
