= Gurab Pas =

Village in Gilan province, Iran

Gurab Pas Persian: گوراب پس
- Village
- Location within Iran
- Coordinates: 37°08′52″N 49°18′53″E
- Country: Iran
- Province: Gilan
- County: Fuman
- District: Central
- Rural District: Gurab Pas

Population (2016)
  - Total: 1,433
- Time zone: UTC+3:30 (IRST)

Gurab Pas (Persian: گوراب پس) (Note: Also romanized as Gūrāb Pas; also known as Kurapas) is a village in, and the capital of, Gurab Pas Rural District in the Central District of Fuman County, Gilan province, Iran.

== Demographics ==
=== Population ===
At the time of the 2006 National Census, the village's population was 1,734 in 444 households. The following census in 2011 counted 1,563 people in 489 households. The 2016 census measured the population of the village as 1,433 people in 506 households. It was the most populous village in its rural district.
