= Otur Sara =

Otur Sara اتورسرا
- Village
- Location within Iran
- Coordinates: 37°15′18″N 49°15′45″E
- Country: Iran
- Province: Gilan
- County: Fuman
- Bakhsh: Central
- Rural District: Lulaman

Population (2016)
  - Total: 179
- Time zone: UTC+3:30 (IRST)

Otur Sara (Persian: اتورسرا, also Romanized as Otūr Sarā) is a village in Lulaman Rural District, in the Central District of Fuman County, Gilan Province, Iran.

At the time of the 2006 National Census, the village's population was 151 in 34 households. The following census in 2011 counted 111 people in 31 households. The 2016 census measured the population of the village as 179 people in 60 households.
