= Khatib Gurab =

Khatib Gurab خطيب گوراب
- Village
- Location within Iran
- Coordinates: 37°14′33″N 49°21′08″E
- Country: Iran
- Province: Gilan
- County: Fuman
- Bakhsh: Central
- Rural District: Rud Pish

Population (2016)
  - Total: 115
- Time zone: UTC+3:30 (IRST)

Khatib Gurab (Persian: خطيب گوراب, also Romanized as Khaţīb Gūrāb) is a village in Rud Pish Rural District, in the Central District of Fuman County, Gilan Province, Iran.

At the time of the 2006 National Census, the village's population was 109 in 28 households. The following census in 2011 counted 129 people in 35 households. The 2016 census measured the population of the village as 115 people in 40 households.
