= Eshkalan =

Village in Gilan province, Iran

Eshkalan Persian: اشكلن
- Village
- Location within Iran
- Coordinates: 37°15′37″N 49°15′17″E
- Country: Iran
- Province: Gilan
- County: Fuman
- District: Central
- Rural District: Lulaman

Population (2016)
  - Total: 448
- Time zone: UTC+3:30 (IRST)

Eshkalan (Persian: اشكلن) (Note: Also romanized as Eshkalān) is a village in Lulaman Rural District of the Central District in Fuman County, Gilan province, Iran.

== Demographics ==
=== Population ===
At the time of the 2006 National Census, the village's population was 597 in 160 households. The following census in 2011 counted 531 people in 155 households. The 2016 census measured the population of the village as 448 people in 151 households.
