= Tang Darreh =

Tang Darreh or Tang-e Darreh (Persian: تنگدره) may refer to:

- Tang Darreh, Gilan
- Tang Darreh, Mazandaran
