= Kamamradkh =

Village in Gilan province, Iran

Kamamradkh Persian: كمامردخ
- Village
- Location within Iran
- Coordinates: 37°16′42″N 49°15′28″E
- Country: Iran
- Province: Gilan
- County: Fuman
- District: Central
- Rural District: Lulaman

Population (2016)
  - Total: 701
- Time zone: UTC+3:30 (IRST)

Kamamradkh (Persian: كمامردخ) (Note: Also romanized as Kamāmradkh) is a village in Lulaman Rural District of the Central District in Fuman County, Gilan province, Iran.

== Demographics ==
=== Population ===
At the time of the 2006 National Census, the village's population was 1,018 in 256 households. The following census in 2011 counted 799 people in 245 households. The 2016 census measured the population of the village as 701 people in 243 households.
