= Khoda Shahr =

Khoda Shahr خداشهر
- Village
- Location within Iran
- Coordinates: 37°12′23″N 49°23′01″E
- Country: Iran
- Province: Gilan
- County: Fuman
- Bakhsh: Central
- Rural District: Rud Pish

Population (2016)
  - Total: 196
- Time zone: UTC+3:30 (IRST)

Khoda Shahr (Persian: خداشهر, also Romanized as Khodā Shahr; also known as Khodashekhr) is a village in Rud Pish Rural District, in the Central District of Fuman County, Gilan Province, Iran.

At the time of the 2006 National Census, the village's population was 223. The following census in 2011 counted 203 people in 58 households. The 2016 census measured the population of the village as 196 people in 71 households.
