= Chiran =

Village in Gilan province, Iran

Chiran Persian: چيران
- Village
- Location within Iran
- Coordinates: 37°12′06″N 49°22′26″E
- Country: Iran
- Province: Gilan
- County: Fuman
- District: Central
- Rural District: Rud Pish

Population (2016)
  - Total: 824
- Time zone: UTC+3:30 (IRST)

Chiran (Persian: چيران) (Note: Also romanized as Chīrān) is a village in Rud Pish Rural District of the Central District in Fuman County, Gilan province, Iran.

== Demographics ==
=== Population ===
At the time of the 2006 National Census, the village's population was 1,204 in 283 households. The following census in 2011 counted 1,032 people in 300 households. The 2016 census measured the population of the village as 824 people in 275 households.
