= Khorram Bisheh =

Khorram Bisheh خرم بيشه
- Village
- Location within Iran
- Coordinates: 37°14′30″N 49°24′33″E
- Country: Iran
- Province: Gilan
- County: Fuman
- Bakhsh: Central
- Rural District: Rud Pish

Population (2016)
  - Total: 232
- Time zone: UTC+3:30 (IRST)

Khorram Bisheh (Persian: خرم بيشه, also Romanized as Khorram Bīsheh) is a village in Rud Pish Rural District, in the Central District of Fuman County, Gilan Province, Iran.

At the time of the 2006 National Census, the village's population was 303 in 91 households. The following census in 2011 counted 272 people in 94 households. The 2016 census measured the population of the village as 232 people in 78 households.
