= Pamesar =

Pamesar پامسار
- Village
- Location within Iran
- Coordinates: 37°13′48″N 49°16′21″E
- Country: Iran
- Province: Gilan
- County: Fuman
- Bakhsh: Central
- Rural District: Lulaman

Population (2016)
  - Total: 302
- Time zone: UTC+3:30 (IRST)

Pamesar (Persian: پامسار, also Romanized as Pāmesār and Pāmsār) is a village in Lulaman Rural District, in the Central District of Fuman County, Gilan Province, Iran.

At the time of the 2006 National Census, the village's population was 328 in 90 households. The following census in 2011 counted 356 people in 104 households. The 2016 census measured the population of the village as 302 people in 106 households.
