= Molla Kuh =

Molla Kuh ملاكوه
- Village
- Interactive map of Molla Kuh
- Coordinates: 37.273°N 49.364°E
- Country: Iran
- Province: Gilan
- County: Fuman
- Bakhsh: Central
- Rural District: Rud Pish

Population (2016)
  - Total: 18
- Time zone: UTC+3:30 (IRST)

Molla Kuh (Persian: ملاكوه, also Romanized as Mollā Kūh) is a village in Rud Pish Rural District, in the Central District of Fuman County, Gilan Province, Iran.

At the time of the 2006 National Census, the village's population was 41 in 9 households. The following census in 2011 counted 20 people in 9 households. The 2016 census measured the population of the village as 18 people in 8 households.
