= Kiaban =

Kiaban كيابان
- Village
- Location within Iran
- Coordinates: 37°14′20″N 49°22′16″E
- Country: Iran
- Province: Gilan
- County: Fuman
- Bakhsh: Central
- Rural District: Rud Pish

Population (2016)
  - Total: 319
- Time zone: UTC+3:30 (IRST)

Kiaban (Persian: كيابان, also Romanized as Kīābān) is a village in Rud Pish Rural District, in the Central District of Fuman County, Gilan Province, Iran.

At the time of the 2006 National Census, the village's population was 505 in 133 households. The following census in 2011 counted 349 people in 109 households. The 2016 census measured the population of the village as 319 people in 104 households.
