= Gol Afzan =

Village in Gilan province, Iran

Gol Afzan Persian: گل افزان
- Village
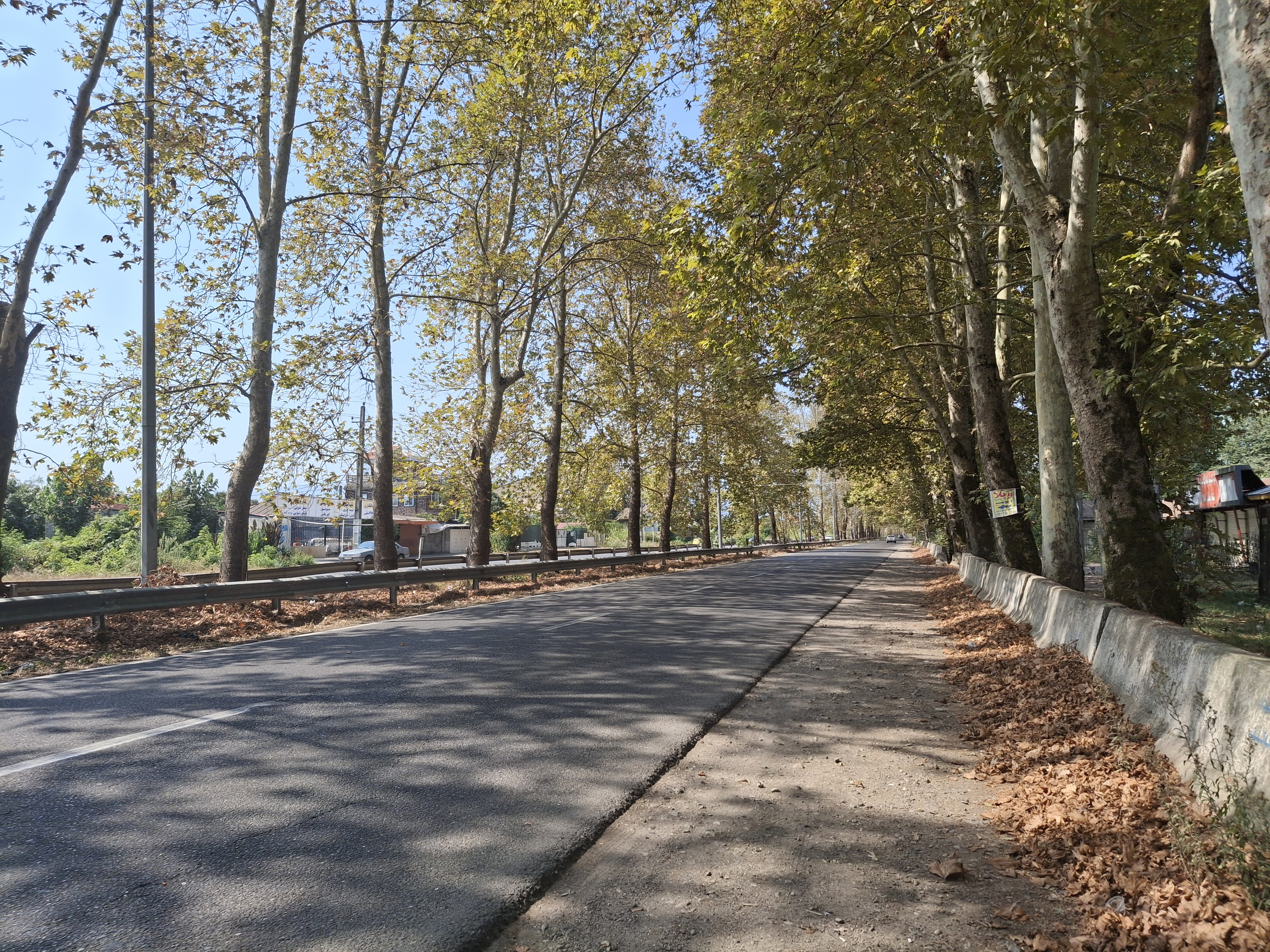
- The village of Gol Afzan in August 2025

- Location within Iran
- Coordinates: 37°15′09″N 49°20′58″E
- Country: Iran
- Province: Gilan
- County: Fuman
- District: Central
- Rural District: Rud Pish

Population (2016)
  - Total: 664
- Time zone: UTC+3:30 (IRST)

Gol Afzan (Persian: گل افزان) (Note: Also romanized as Gol Afzān; also known as Kilavzan) is a village in Rud Pish Rural District of the Central District in Fuman County, Gilan province, Iran.

== Demographics ==
=== Population ===
At the time of the 2006 National Census, the village's population was 798 in 214 households. The following census in 2011 counted 729 people in 228 households. The 2016 census measured the population of the village as 664 people in 226 households.
