= Buin, Gilan =

Village in Gilan province, Iran

Buin Persian: بوئين
- Village
- Location within Iran
- Coordinates: 37°11′16″N 49°20′31″E
- Country: Iran
- Province: Gilan
- County: Fuman
- District: Central
- Rural District: Gasht

Population (2016)
  - Total: 529
- Time zone: UTC+3:30 (IRST)

Buin (Persian: بوئين) (Note: Also romanized as Bū’īn) is a village in Gasht Rural District of the Central District in Fuman County, Gilan province, Iran.

== Demographics ==
=== Population ===
At the time of the 2006 National Census, the village's population was 676 in 205 households. The following census in 2011 counted 651 people in 208 households. The 2016 census measured the population of the village as 529 people in 199 households.
