= Mavardian =

Village in Gilan province, Iran

Mavardian Persian: ماورديان
- Village
- Location within Iran
- Coordinates: 37°15′35″N 49°18′35″E
- Country: Iran
- Province: Gilan
- County: Fuman
- District: Central
- Rural District: Lulaman

Population (2016)
  - Total: 486
- Time zone: UTC+3:30 (IRST)

Mavardian (Persian: ماورديان) (Note: Also romanized as Māvardīān) is a village in Lulaman Rural District of the Central District in Fuman County, Gilan province, Iran.

== Demographics ==
=== Population ===
At the time of the 2006 National Census, the village's population was 551 in 138 households. The following census in 2011 counted 528 people in 179 households. The 2016 census measured the population of the village as 486 people in 170 households.
