= Maleskam =

Village in Gilan province, Iran

Maleskam Persian: ملسكام
- Village
- Location within Iran
- Coordinates: 37°08′03″N 49°18′57″E
- Country: Iran
- Province: Gilan
- County: Fuman
- District: Central
- Rural District: Gurab Pas

Population (2016)
  - Total: 610
- Time zone: UTC+3:30 (IRST)

Maleskam (Persian: ملسكام) (Note: Also romanized as Maleskām and Moleskām; also known as Mowlīskān) is a village in Gurab Pas Rural District of the Central District in Fuman County, Gilan province, Iran.

== Demographics ==
=== Population ===
At the time of the 2006 National Census, the village's population was 816 in 207 households. The following census in 2011 counted 717 people in 227 households. The 2016 census measured the population of the village as 610 people in 219 households.
