= Kohneh Gurab, Fuman =

Village in Gilan province, Iran

Kohneh Gurab Persian: كهنه گوراب
- Village
- Location within Iran
- Coordinates: 37°13′21″N 49°25′06″E
- Country: Iran
- Province: Gilan
- County: Fuman
- District: Central
- Rural District: Rud Pish

Population (2016)
  - Total: 510
- Time zone: UTC+3:30 (IRST)

Kohneh Gurab (Persian: كهنه گوراب) (Note: Also romanized as Kohneh Gūrāb) is a village in Rud Pish Rural District of the Central District in Fuman County, Gilan province, Iran.

== Demographics ==
=== Population ===
At the time of the 2006 National Census, the village's population was 675 in 185 households. The following census in 2011 counted 585 people in 176 households. The 2016 census measured the population of the village as 510 people in 171 households.
