= Serabostan =

Village in Gilan province, Iran

Serabostan Persian: سرابستان
- Village
- Location within Iran
- Country: Iran
- Province: Gilan
- County: Fuman
- District: Central
- Rural District: Gasht

Population (2016)
  - Total: 665
- Time zone: UTC+3:30 (IRST)

Serabostan (Persian: سرابستان) (Note: Also romanized as Serābostān) is a village in Gasht Rural District of the Central District in Fuman County, Gilan province, Iran.

== Demographics ==
=== Population ===
At the time of the 2006 National Census, the village's population was 648 in 167 households. The following census in 2011 counted 692 people in 212 households. The 2016 census measured the population of the village as 665 people in 220 households.
