= Khesmakh =

Village in Gilan province, Iran

Khesmakh Persian: خسمخ
- Village
- Location within Iran
- Coordinates: 37°12′16″N 49°23′51″E
- Country: Iran
- Province: Gilan
- County: Fuman
- District: Central
- Rural District: Rud Pish

Population (2016)
  - Total: 798
- Time zone: UTC+3:30 (IRST)

Khesmakh (Persian: خسمخ) (Note: Also romanized as Khasmakh; also known as Khesmah) is a village in Rud Pish Rural District of the Central District in Fuman County, Gilan province, Iran.

== Demographics ==
=== Population ===
At the time of the 2006 National Census, the village's population was 1,142 in 285 households. The following census in 2011 counted 976 people in 280 households. The 2016 census measured the population of the village as 798 people in 289 households.
