= Malavan, Gilan =

Malavan مالوان
- Village
- Location within Iran
- Coordinates: 37°14′38″N 49°21′56″E
- Country: Iran
- Province: Gilan
- County: Fuman
- Bakhsh: Central
- Rural District: Rud Pish

Population (2016)
  - Total: 225
- Time zone: UTC+3:30 (IRST)

Malavan (Persian: مالوان, also Romanized as Mālavān and Mālevān) is a village in Rud Pish Rural District, in the Central District of Fuman County, Gilan Province, Iran.

At the time of the 2006 National Census, the village's population was 333 in 105 households. The following census in 2011 counted 259 people in 86 households. The 2016 census measured the population of the village as 225 people in 86 households.
