= Darbagh, Gilan =

Village in Gilan province, Iran

Darbagh Persian: دارباغ
- Village
- Location within Iran
- Coordinates: 37°09′24″N 49°15′49″E
- Country: Iran
- Province: Gilan
- County: Fuman
- District: Central
- Rural District: Gasht

Population (2016)
  - Total: 703
- Time zone: UTC+3:30 (IRST)

Darbagh (Persian: دارباغ) (Note: Also romanized as Dārbāgh) is a village in Gasht Rural District of the Central District in Fuman County, Gilan province, Iran.

== Demographics ==
=== Population ===
At the time of the 2006 National Census, the village's population was 856 in 222 households. The following census in 2011 counted 766 people in 244 households. The 2016 census measured the population of the village as 703 people in 235 households.
