= Dazdak, Gilan =

Dazdak دزدک
- Village
- Location within Iran
- Coordinates: 37°14′10″N 49°17′59″E
- Country: Iran
- Province: Gilan
- County: Fuman
- Bakhsh: Central
- Rural District: Lulaman

Population (2016)
  - Total: 236
- Time zone: UTC+3:30 (IRST)

Dazdak (Persian: دزدک) is a village in Lulaman Rural District, in the Central District of Fuman County, Gilan Province, Iran.

At the time of the 2006 National Census, the village's population was 295 in 73 households. The following census in 2011 counted 256 people in 69 households. The 2016 census measured the population of the village as 236 people in 76 households.
