= Seyyedabad, Gilan =

Village in Gilan province, Iran

Seyyedabad Persian: سيداباد
- Village
- Location within Iran
- Coordinates: 37°07′17″N 49°17′49″E
- Country: Iran
- Province: Gilan
- County: Fuman
- District: Central
- Rural District: Gurab Pas

Population (2016)
  - Total: 567
- Time zone: UTC+3:30 (IRST)

Seyyedabad (Persian: سيداباد) (Note: Also romanized as Seyyedābād) is a village in Gurab Pas Rural District of the Central District in Fuman County, Gilan province, Iran.

== Demographics ==
=== Population ===
At the time of the 2006 National Census, the village's population was 883 in 254 households. The following census in 2011 counted 788 people in 243 households. The 2016 census measured the population of the village as 567 people in 193 households.
