= Giga Sar =

Village in Gilan province, Iran

Giga Sar Persian: گیگاسر
- Village
- Location within Iran
- Coordinates: 37°15′44″N 49°23′04″E
- Country: Iran
- Province: Gilan
- County: Fuman
- District: Central
- Rural District: Rud Pish

Population (2016)
  - Total: 674
- Time zone: UTC+3:30 (IRST)

Giga Sar (Persian: گيگاسر) (Note: Also romanized as Gīgā Sar and Gīgāsar) is a village in Rud Pish Rural District of the Central District in Fuman County, Gilan province, Iran.

== Demographics ==
=== Population ===
At the time of the 2006 National Census, the village's population was 909 in 259 households. The following census in 2011 counted 738 people in 242 households. The 2016 census measured the population of the village as 674 people in 248 households.
