= Nasrollahabad, Fuman =

Nasrollahabad نصراله آباد
- Village
- Location within Iran
- Coordinates: 37°14′48″N 49°15′28″E
- Country: Iran
- Province: Gilan
- County: Fuman
- Bakhsh: Central
- Rural District: Lulaman

Population (2016)
  - Total: 55
- Time zone: UTC+3:30 (IRST)

Nasrollahabad (Persian: نصراله آباد, also Romanized as Naşrollāhābād) is a village in Lulaman Rural District, in the Central District of Fuman County, Gilan Province, Iran.

At the time of the 2006 National Census, the village's population was 81 in 18 households. The following census in 2011 counted 72 people in 22 households. The 2016 census measured the population of the village as 55 people in 21 households.
