= Azbar =

Village in Gilan province, Iran

Azbar Persian: ازبر
- Village
- Location within Iran
- Coordinates: 37°09′57″N 49°20′19″E
- Country: Iran
- Province: Gilan
- County: Fuman
- District: Central
- Rural District: Gurab Pas

Population (2016)
  - Total: 530
- Time zone: UTC+3:30 (IRST)

Azbar (Persian: ازبر) is a village in Gurab Pas Rural District of the Central District in Fuman County, Gilan province, Iran.

== Demographics ==
=== Population ===
At the time of the 2006 National Census, the village's population was 691 in 175 households. The following census in 2011 counted 591 people in 197 households. The 2016 census measured the population of the village as 530 people in 183 households.
