= Kas Ahmadan =

Kas Ahmadan كاس احمدان
- Village
- Location within Iran
- Coordinates: 37°14′44″N 49°18′24″E
- Country: Iran
- Province: Gilan
- County: Fuman
- Bakhsh: Central
- Rural District: Lulaman

Population (2016)
  - Total: 184
- Time zone: UTC+3:30 (IRST)

Kas Ahmadan (Persian: كاس احمدان, also Romanized as Kās Aḩmadān; also known as Kāseh Aḩmadān) is a village in Lulaman Rural District, in the Central District of Fuman County, Gilan Province, Iran.

At the time of the 2006 National Census, the village's population was 297 in 69 households. The following census in 2011 counted 242 people in 72 households. The 2016 census measured the population of the village as 184 people in 65 households.
