= Ladmokh =

Ladmokh or Ladmakh (Persian: لادمخ) may refer to:

- Ladmokh, Fuman
- Ladmokh, Sowme'eh Sara
