= Pish Hesar =

Village in Gilan province, Iran

Pish Hesar Persian: پيش حصار
- Village
- Location within Iran
- Coordinates: 37°12′44″N 49°15′41″E
- Country: Iran
- Province: Gilan
- County: Fuman
- District: Central
- Rural District: Gasht

Population (2016)
  - Total: 878
- Time zone: UTC+3:30 (IRST)

Pish Hesar (Persian: پيش حصار) (Note: Also romanized as Pīsh Ḩeşār) is a village in Gasht Rural District of the Central District in Fuman County, Gilan province, Iran.

== Demographics ==
=== Population ===
At the time of the 2006 National Census, the village's population was 914 in 239 households. The following census in 2011 counted 996 people in 294 households. The 2016 census measured the population of the village as 878 people in 256 households.
