= Kordabad, Gilan =

Kordabad كردآباد
- Village
- Location within Iran
- Coordinates: 37°12′40″N 49°20′18″E
- Country: Iran
- Province: Gilan
- County: Fuman
- Bakhsh: Central
- Rural District: Rud Pish

Population (2016)
  - Total: 293
- Time zone: UTC+3:30 (IRST)

Kordabad (Persian: كردآباد, also Romanized as Kordābād and Kardabad) is a village in Rud Pish Rural District, in the Central District of Fuman County, Gilan Province, Iran.

At the time of the 2006 National Census, the village's population was 336 in 83 households. The following census in 2011 counted 293 people in 91 households. The 2016 census measured the population of the village as 293 people in 101 households.
