= Now Deh, Fuman =

Now Deh نوده
- Village
- Location within Iran
- Coordinates: 37°13′26″N 49°20′30″E
- Country: Iran
- Province: Gilan
- County: Fuman
- Bakhsh: Central
- Rural District: Rud Pish

Population (2016)
  - Total: 340
- Time zone: UTC+3:30 (IRST)

Now Deh (Persian: نوده; also known as Nuude) is a village in Rud Pish Rural District, in the Central District of Fuman County, Gilan Province, Iran. It lies northeast of Fuman city.

At the time of the 2006 National Census, the village's population was 420 in 113 households. The following census in 2011 counted 395 people in 131 households. The 2016 census measured the population of the village as 340 people in 125 households.
