= Geran, Gilan =

Geran گران
- Village
- Location within Iran
- Coordinates: 37°15′09″N 49°18′55″E
- Country: Iran
- Province: Gilan
- County: Fuman
- Bakhsh: Central
- Rural District: Lulaman

Population (2016)
  - Total: 254
- Time zone: UTC+3:30 (IRST)

Geran (Persian: گران, also Romanized as Gerān) is a village in Lulaman Rural District, in the Central District of Fuman County, Gilan Province, Iran.

At the time of the 2006 National Census, the village's population was 270 in 63 households. The following census in 2011 counted 286 people in 94 households. The 2016 census measured the population of the village as 254 people in 94 households.
