= Send-e Pain =

Send-e Pain سندپائين
- Village
- Location within Iran
- Coordinates: 37°14′48″N 49°20′22″E
- Country: Iran
- Province: Gilan
- County: Fuman
- Bakhsh: Central
- Rural District: Rud Pish

Population (2016)
  - Total: 371
- Time zone: UTC+3:30 (IRST)

Send-e Pain (Persian: سندپائين, also Romanized as Send-e Pā’īn and Send-e Pāeen) is a village in Rud Pish Rural District, in the Central District of Fuman County, Gilan Province, Iran.

At the time of the 2006 National Census, the village's population was 338 in 87 households. The following census in 2011 counted 338 people in 104 households. The 2016 census measured the population of the village as 371 people in 126 households.
