= Send-e Bala =

Village in Gilan province, Iran

Send-e Bala Persian: سندبالا
- Village
- Location within Iran
- Coordinates: 37°14′18″N 49°20′26″E
- Country: Iran
- Province: Gilan
- County: Fuman
- District: Central
- Rural District: Rud Pish

Population (2016)
  - Total: 765
- Time zone: UTC+3:30 (IRST)

Send-e Bala (Persian: سندبالا) (Note: Also romanized as Send-e Bālā) is a village in Rud Pish Rural District of the Central District in Fuman County, Gilan province, Iran.

== Demographics ==
=== Population ===
At the time of the 2006 National Census, the village's population was 952 in 255 households. The following census in 2011 counted 964 people in 314 households. The 2016 census measured the population of the village as 765 people in 274 households.
