= Makhsar =

Makhsar مخ سر
- Village
- Location within Iran
- Coordinates: 37°14′33″N 49°22′47″E
- Country: Iran
- Province: Gilan
- County: Fuman
- Bakhsh: Central
- Rural District: Rud Pish

Population (2016)
  - Total: 220
- Time zone: UTC+3:30 (IRST)

Makhsar (Persian: مخ سر, also Romanized as Makhser and Mokhsar; also known as Mahser) is a village in Rud Pish Rural District, in the Central District of Fuman County, Gilan Province, Iran.

At the time of the 2006 National Census, the village's population was 189 in 56 households. The following census in 2011 counted 180 people in 54 households. The 2016 census measured the population of the village as 220 people in 77 households.
