= Allaheh Gurab =

Village in Gilan province, Iran

Allaheh Gurab Persian: آلاله گوراب
- Village
- Location within Iran
- Coordinates: 37°14′N 49°19′E
- Country: Iran
- Province: Gilan
- County: Fuman
- District: Central
- Rural District: Lulaman

Population (2016)
  - Total: 469
- Time zone: UTC+3:30 (IRST)

Allaheh Gurab (Persian: آلاله گوراب) (Note: Also romanized as Ālāleh Gūrāb; also known as Allāh Gūrāb) is a village in Lulaman Rural District of the Central District in Fuman County, Gilan province, Iran.

== Demographics ==
=== Population ===
At the time of the 2006 National Census, the village's population was 686 in 174 households. The following census in 2011 counted 667 people in 198 households. The 2016 census measured the population of the village as 469 people in 156 households.
