= Gorbeh Kucheh =

Gorbeh Kucheh گربه كوچه
- Village
- Location within Iran
- Coordinates: 37°14′12″N 49°19′41″E
- Country: Iran
- Province: Gilan
- County: Fuman
- Bakhsh: Central
- Rural District: Rud Pish

Population (2016)
  - Total: 183
- Time zone: UTC+3:30 (IRST)

Gorbeh Kucheh (Persian: گربه كوچه, also Romanized as Gorbeh Kūcheh; also known as Gorbeh Kūjeh) is a village in Rud Pish Rural District, in the Central District of Fuman County, Gilan Province, Iran. At the 2016 census, its population was 183, in 64 families. Up from 105 in 2006.
