= Halqeh Sara =

Halqeh Sara حلقه سرا
- Village
- Location within Iran
- Coordinates: 37°14′03″N 49°20′49″E
- Country: Iran
- Province: Gilan
- County: Fuman
- Bakhsh: Central
- Rural District: Rud Pish

Population (2016)
  - Total: 137
- Time zone: UTC+3:30 (IRST)

Halqeh Sara (Persian: حلقه سرا, also Romanized as Ḩalqeh Sarā; also known as Ḩalqeh Sar and Khalgeser) is a village in Rud Pish Rural District, in the Central District of Fuman County, Gilan Province, Iran.

At the time of the 2006 National Census, the village's population was 139 in 39 households. The following census in 2011 counted 145 people in 46 households. The 2016 census measured the population of the village as 137 people in 48 households.
