= Ala Sar =

Ala Sar آلاسر
- Village
- Location within Iran
- Coordinates: 37°14′36″N 49°22′34″E
- Country: Iran
- Province: Gilan
- County: Fuman
- Bakhsh: Central
- Rural District: Rud Pish

Population (2016)
  - Total: 193
- Time zone: UTC+3:30 (IRST)

Ala Sar (Persian: آلاسر, also Romanized as Ālā Sar) is a village in Rud Pish Rural District, in the Central District of Fuman County, Gilan Province, Iran. At the 2006 census, its population was 276, in 94 families.

At the time of the 2006 National Census, the village's population was 276 in 94 households. The following census in 2011 counted 208 people in 64 households. The 2016 census measured the population of the village as 193 people in 72 households.
