= Tazehabad-e Kalashem =

Tazehabad-e Kalashem تازه آباد كلاشم
- Village
- Location within Iran
- Coordinates: 37°14′48″N 49°23′15″E
- Country: Iran
- Province: Gilan
- County: Fuman
- Bakhsh: Central
- Rural District: Rud Pish

Population (2016)
  - Total: 486
- Time zone: UTC+3:30 (IRST)

Tazehabad-e Kalashem (Persian: تازه آباد كلاشم, also Romanized as Tāzehābād-e Kalāshem) is a village in Rud Pish Rural District, in the Central District of Fuman County, Gilan Province, Iran.

At the time of the 2006 National Census, its population was 512 in 149 households, In the following census of 2011, its population of 462 people in 145 households. The 2016 census measured the population of the village as 486 people in 181 households.
