= Qaleh Kol, Fuman =

Village in Gilan province, Iran

Qaleh Kol Persian: قلعه كل
- Village
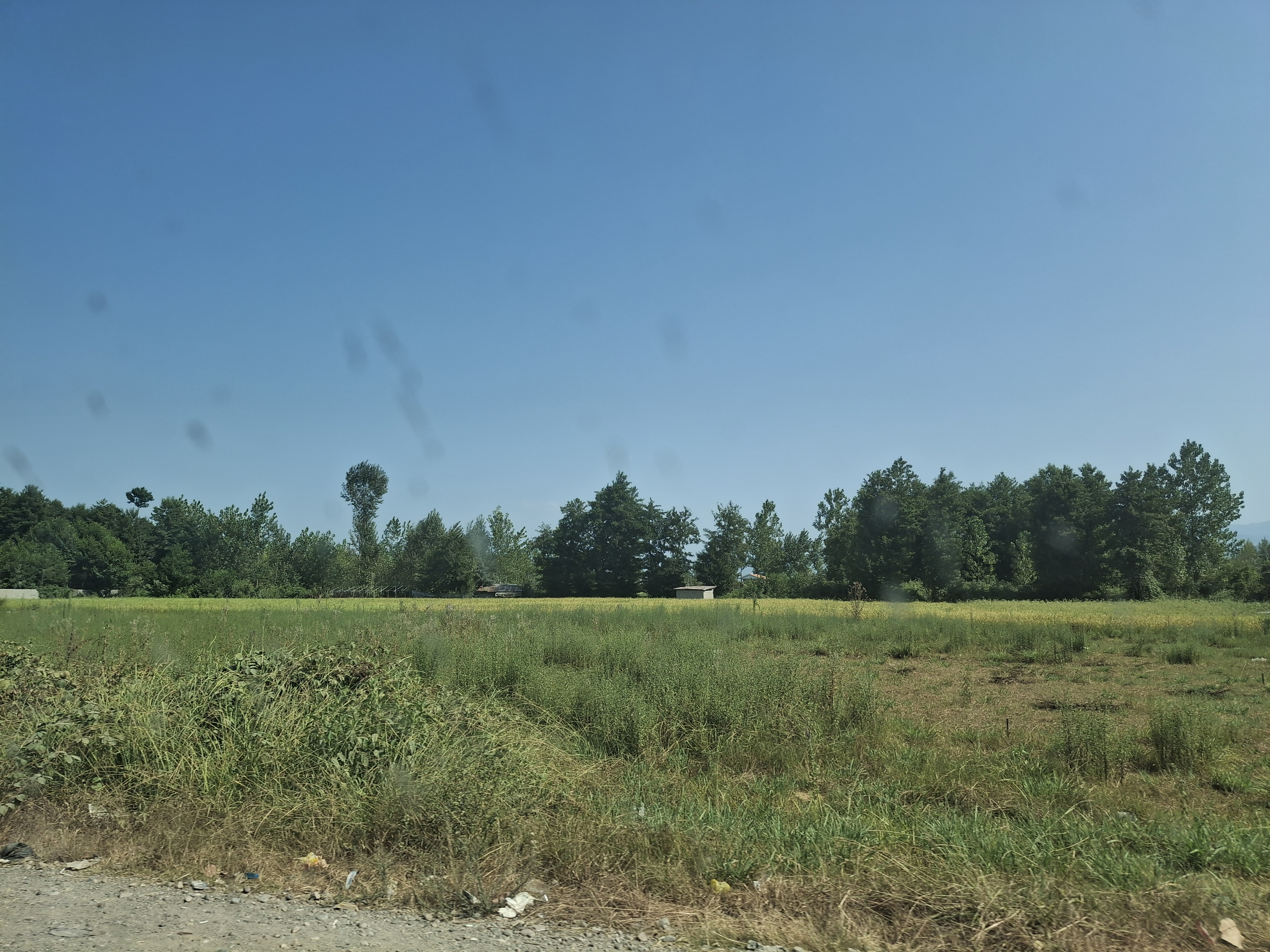
- Landscape in the village of Qaleh Kol

- Location within Iran
- Coordinates: 37°12′57″N 49°17′05″E
- Country: Iran
- Province: Gilan
- County: Fuman
- District: Central
- Rural District: Gasht

Population (2016)
  - Total: 687
- Time zone: UTC+3:30 (IRST)

Qaleh Kol (Persian: قلعه كل) (Note: Also romanized as Qal‘eh Kol) is a village in Gasht Rural District of the Central District in Fuman County, Gilan province, Iran.

== Demographics ==
=== Population ===
At the time of the 2006 National Census, the village's population was 480 in 121 households. The following census in 2011 counted 526 people in 155 households. The 2016 census measured the population of the village as 687 people in 186 households.
