= Gushlavandan =

Village in Gilan province, Iran

Gushlavandan Persian: گوشلوندان
- Village
- Location within Iran
- Coordinates: 37°13′02″N 49°21′20″E
- Country: Iran
- Province: Gilan
- County: Fuman
- District: Central
- Rural District: Rud Pish

Population (2016)
  - Total: 817
- Time zone: UTC+3:30 (IRST)

Gushlavandan (Persian: گوشلوندان) (Note: Also romanized as Gūshlavandān; also known as Gūshī Lavandān, Koshlyavandan, and Kūshalvandān) is a village in Rud Pish Rural District of the Central District in Fuman County, Gilan province, Iran.

== Demographics ==
=== Population ===
At the time of the 2006 National Census, the village's population was 940 in 242 households. The following census in 2011 counted 898 people in 309 households. The 2016 census measured the population of the village as 817 people in 283 households.
