= Shir-e Tar =

Shir-e Tar شيرتر
- Village
- Location within Iran
- Coordinates: 37°14′41″N 49°16′12″E
- Country: Iran
- Province: Gilan
- County: Fuman
- Bakhsh: Central
- Rural District: Lulaman

Population (2016)
  - Total: 156
- Time zone: UTC+3:30 (IRST)

Shir-e Tar (Persian: شيرتر, also Romanized as Shīr-e Tar) is a village in Lulaman Rural District, in the Central District of Fuman County, Gilan Province, Iran.

At the time of the 2006 National Census, the village's population was 178 in 60 households. The following census in 2011 counted 177 people in 46 households. The 2016 census measured the population of the village as 156 people in 51 households.
