= Kaldeh, Fuman =

Kaldeh كلده
- Village
- Location within Iran
- Coordinates: 37°16′24″N 49°20′27″E
- Country: Iran
- Province: Gilan
- County: Fuman
- Bakhsh: Central
- Rural District: Lulaman

Population (2016)
  - Total: 339
- Time zone: UTC+3:30 (IRST)

Kaldeh (Persian: كلده) is a village in Lulaman Rural District, in the Central District of Fuman County, Gilan Province, Iran.

At the time of the 2006 National Census, the village's population was 565 in 170 households. The following census in 2011 counted 394 people in 147 households. The 2016 census measured the population of the village as 339 people in 144 households.
