= Gasht-e Gurab =

Gasht-e Gurab گشت گوراب
- Village
- Location within Iran
- Coordinates: 37°10′34″N 49°15′49″E
- Country: Iran
- Province: Gilan
- County: Fuman
- Bakhsh: Central
- Rural District: Gasht

Population (2006)
  - Total: 386
- Time zone: UTC+3:30 (IRST)
  - Summer (DST): UTC+4:30 (IRDT)

Gasht-e Gurab (Persian: گشت گوراب, also Romanized as Gasht-e Gūrāb) is a village in Gasht Rural District, in the Central District of Fuman County, Gilan Province, Iran. At the 2006 census, its population was 386, in 104 families.
