= Neqareh Chiyan =

Neqareh Chiyan نقاره چيان
- Village
- Interactive map of Neqareh Chiyan
- Coordinates: 37.237°N 49.334°E
- Country: Iran
- Province: Gilan
- County: Fuman
- Bakhsh: Central
- Rural District: Rud Pish

Population (2016)
  - Total: 80
- Time zone: UTC+3:30 (IRST)

Neqareh Chiyan (Persian: نقاره چيان, also Romanized as Neqāreh Chīyān) is a suburb of the city of Fuman and a village in Rud Pish Rural District, in the Central District of Fuman County, Gilan Province, Iran.

At the time of the 2006 National Census, the village's population was 25 in 8 households. The following census in 2011 counted 79 people in 26 households. The 2016 census measured the population of the village as 80 people in 30 households.
