= Lulaman =

Village in Gilan province, Iran

Lulaman Persian: لولمان
- Village
- Location within Iran
- Coordinates: 37°15′25″N 49°16′16″E
- Country: Iran
- Province: Gilan
- County: Fuman
- District: Central
- Rural District: Lulaman

Population (2016)
  - Total: 423
- Time zone: UTC+3:30 (IRST)

Lulaman (Persian: لولمان) (Note: Also romanized as Lūlamān) is a village in, and the capital of, Lulaman Rural District in the Central District of Fuman County, Gilan province, Iran.

== Demographics ==
=== Population ===
At the time of the 2006 National Census, the village's population was 551 in 151 households. The following census in 2011 counted 481 people in 160 households. The 2016 census measured the population of the village as 423 people in 154 households.
