= Pish Deh =

Pish Deh پيشده
- Village
- Location within Iran
- Coordinates: 37°12′31″N 49°20′52″E
- Country: Iran
- Province: Gilan
- County: Fuman
- Bakhsh: Central
- Rural District: Rud Pish

Population (2016)
  - Total: 226
- Time zone: UTC+3:30 (IRST)

Pish Deh (Persian: پيشده, also Romanized as Pīsh Deh) is a village in Rud Pish Rural District, in the Central District of Fuman County, Gilan Province, Iran.

At the time of the 2006 National Census, the village's population was 272 in 70 households. The following census in 2011 counted 208 people in 64 households. The 2016 census measured the population of the village as 226 people in 74 households.
