= Tang Darreh, Gilan =

Village in Gilan province, Iran

Tang Darreh Persian: تنگدره
- Village
- Location within Iran
- Coordinates: 37°08′13″N 49°13′35″E
- Country: Iran
- Province: Gilan
- County: Fuman
- District: Central
- Rural District: Gurab Pas

Population (2016)
  - Total: 512
- Time zone: UTC+3:30 (IRST)

Tang Darreh (Persian: تنگدره) (Note: Also known as Kamāl Maḩlleh) is a village in Gurab Pas Rural District of the Central District in Fuman County, Gilan province, Iran.

== Demographics ==
=== Population ===
At the time of the 2006 National Census, the village's population was 681 in 173 households. The following census in 2011 counted 658 people in 209 households. The 2016 census measured the population of the village as 512 people in 188 households.
