= Gasht, Gilan =

Village in Gilan province, Iran

Gasht Persian: گشت
- Village
- Location within Iran
- Coordinates: 37°10′53″N 49°17′03″E
- Country: Iran
- Province: Gilan
- County: Fuman
- District: Central
- Rural District: Gasht

Population (2016)
  - Total: 1,840
- Time zone: UTC+3:30 (IRST)

Gasht (Persian: گشت) (Note: Also romanized as Gesht; also known as Dastkhaţ) is a village in, and the capital of, Gasht Rural District in the Central District of Fuman County, Gilan province, Iran.

== Demographics ==
=== Population ===
At the time of the 2006 National Census, the village's population was 1,864 in 490 households. The following census in 2011 counted 2,079 people in 562 households. The 2016 census measured the population of the village as 1,840 people in 587 households.
