= Gasht-e Rudkhan =

Village in Gilan province, Iran

Gasht-e Rudkhan Persian: گشترودخان
- Village
- Location within Iran
- Coordinates: 37°08′06″N 49°12′44″E
- Country: Iran
- Province: Gilan
- County: Fuman
- District: Central
- Rural District: Gurab Pas

Population (2016)
  - Total: 657
- Time zone: UTC+3:30 (IRST)

Gasht-e Rudkhan (Persian: گشترودخان) (Note: Also romanized as Gasht Rūdkhān and Gasht-e Rūdkhān; also known as Keshter-Khan) is a village in Gurab Pas Rural District of the Central District in Fuman County, Gilan province, Iran.

== Demographics ==
=== Population ===
At the time of the 2006 National Census, the village's population was 787 in 202 households. The following census in 2011 counted 727 people in 232 households. The 2016 census measured the population of the village as 657 people in 211 households.
