= Ladmokh, Fuman =

Ladmokh لادمخ
- Village
- Interactive map of Ladmokh
- Coordinates: 37.258°N 49.367°E
- Country: Iran
- Province: Gilan
- County: Fuman
- Bakhsh: Central
- Rural District: Rud Pish

Population (2016)
  - Total: 222
- Time zone: UTC+3:30 (IRST)

Ladmokh (Persian: لادمخ, also Romanized as Lādmokh) is a village in Rud Pish Rural District, in the Central District of Fuman County, Gilan Province, Iran.

At the time of the 2006 National Census, the village's population was 228 in 71 households. The following census in 2011 counted 227 people in 65 households. The 2016 census measured the population of the village as 222 people in 74 households.
