= Shekal Gurab-e Bala =

Village in Gilan province, Iran

Shekal Gurab-e Bala Persian: شكال گوراب بالا
- Village
- Location within Iran
- Coordinates: 37°11′18″N 49°16′36″E
- Country: Iran
- Province: Gilan
- County: Fuman
- District: Central
- Rural District: Gasht

Population (2016)
  - Total: 554
- Time zone: UTC+3:30 (IRST)

Shekal Gurab-e Bala (Persian: شكال گوراب بالا) (Note: Also romanized as Shekāl Gūrāb-e Bālā; also known as Shaghāl Gūrāb, Shakālgūrāb, Shekāl Gūrāb, Shigāl Gurāb, and Shikil’-Kirab) is a village in Gasht Rural District of the Central District in Fuman County, Gilan province, Iran.

== Demographics ==
=== Population ===
At the time of the 2006 National Census, the village's population was 579 in 144 households. The following census in 2011 counted 582 people in 179 households. The 2016 census measured the population of the village as 554 people in 188 households.
