= Gasht Rural District =

Gasht Rural District or Gosht Rural District (Persian: دهستان گشت) may refer to:

- Gasht Rural District (Fuman County)
- Gosht Rural District (Saravan County)
