= Lulaman Rural District (Fuman County) =

Rural district in Gilan province, Iran

Lulaman Rural District Persian: دهستان لولمان
- Rural District
- Location within Iran
- Coordinates: 37°15′N 49°17′E
- Country: Iran
- Province: Gilan
- County: Fuman
- District: Central
- Established: 1987
- Capital: Lulaman

Population (2016)
  - Total: 8,622
- Time zone: UTC+3:30 (IRST)

Lulaman Rural District (Persian: دهستان لولمان) is in the Central District of Fuman County, Gilan province, Iran. Its capital is the village of Lulaman.

== Demographics ==
=== Population ===
At the time of the 2006 National Census, the rural district's population was 10,927 in 2,855 households. There were 9,952 inhabitants in 3,038 households at the following census of 2011. The 2016 census measured the population of the rural district as 8,622 people in 2,990 households. The most populous of its 20 villages was Khoshknudhan-e Bala, with 1,417 people.

=== Other villages in the rural district ===
- Allaheh Gurab
- Baghbanan
- Dazdak
- Eshkalan
- Geran
- Kaldeh
- Kamamradkh
- Kas Ahmadan
- Khoshknudhan-e Pain
- Mavardian
- Nasrollahabad
- Otur Sara
- Pamesar
- Qassabali Sara
- Shanbeh Bazar
- Shir-e Tar
- Siah Piran-e Kashani
- Siah Piran-e Kasmai
