= Maaf Mahalleh =

Maaf Mahalleh معاف محله
- Village
- Location within Iran
- Coordinates: 37°13′47″N 49°24′52″E
- Country: Iran
- Province: Gilan
- County: Fuman
- Bakhsh: Central
- Rural District: Rud Pish

Population (2016)
  - Total: 244
- Time zone: UTC+3:30 (IRST)

Maaf Mahalleh (Persian: معاف محله, also Romanized as Ma‘āf Maḩalleh and Mo‘āf Maḩalleh) is a village in Rud Pish Rural District, in the Central District of Fuman County, Gilan Province, Iran.

At the time of the 2006 National Census, the village's population was 277 in 83 households. The following census in 2011 counted 268 people in 90 households. The 2016 census measured the population of the village as 244 people in 94 households.
