= Khoshknudhan-e Bala =

Village in Gilan province, Iran

Khoshknudhan-e Bala Persian: خشك نودهان بالا
- Village
- Location within Iran
- Coordinates: 37°14′32″N 49°13′59″E
- Country: Iran
- Province: Gilan
- County: Fuman
- District: Central
- Rural District: Lulaman

Population (2016)
  - Total: 1,417
- Time zone: UTC+3:30 (IRST)

Khoshknudhan-e Bala (Persian: خشك نودهان بالا) (Note: Also romanized as Khoshk Now Dehān-e Bālā and Khoshknūdhān-e Bālā) is a village in Lulaman Rural District of the Central District in Fuman County, Gilan province, Iran.

== Demographics ==
=== Population ===
At the time of the 2006 National Census, the village's population was 1,547 in 416 households. The following census in 2011 counted 1,434 people in 436 households. The 2016 census measured the population of the village as 1,417 people in 467 households. It was the most populous village in its rural district.
