= Mir Mahalleh, Fuman =

Mir Mahalleh ميرمحله
- Village
- Location within Iran
- Coordinates: 37°12′57″N 49°24′05″E
- Country: Iran
- Province: Gilan
- County: Fuman
- Bakhsh: Central
- Rural District: Rud Pish

Population (2016)
  - Total: 184
- Time zone: UTC+3:30 (IRST)

Mir Mahalleh (Persian: ميرمحله, also Romanized as Mīr Maḩalleh) is a village in Rud Pish Rural District, in the Central District of Fuman County, Gilan Province, Iran.

At the time of the 2006 National Census, the village's population was 200 in 49 households. The following census in 2011 counted 200 people in 64 households. The 2016 census measured the population of the village as 184 people in 72 households.
