= Siah Piran-e Kashani =

Siah Piran-e Kashani سياه پيران كاشاني
- Village
- Location within Iran
- Coordinates: 37°15′57″N 49°18′57″E
- Country: Iran
- Province: Gilan
- County: Fuman
- Bakhsh: Central
- Rural District: Lulaman

Population (2016)
  - Total: 314
- Time zone: UTC+3:30 (IRST)

Siah Piran-e Kashani (Persian: سياه پيران كاشاني, also Romanized as Sīāh Pīrān-e Kāshānī; also known as Sīāh Pīrān) is a village in Lulaman Rural District, in the Central District of Fuman County, Gilan Province, Iran.

At the time of the 2006 National Census, the village's population was 400 in 102 households. The following census in 2011 counted 326 people in 100 households. The 2016 census measured the population of the village as 314 people in 113 households.
