= Siah Piran-e Kasmai =

Siah Piran-e Kasmai سياه پيران كسمائی
- Village
- Location within Iran
- Coordinates: 37°17′44″N 49°26′02″E
- Country: Iran
- Province: Gilan
- County: Fuman
- Bakhsh: Central
- Rural District: Lulaman

Population (2016)
  - Total: 201
- Time zone: UTC+3:30 (IRST)

Siah Piran-e Kasmai (Persian: سياه پيران كسمائی, also Romanized as Sīāh Pīrān-e Kasmā’ī; also known as Shālgā and Shālkā) is a village in Lulaman Rural District, in the Central District of Fuman County, Gilan Province, Iran.

At the time of the 2006 National Census, the village's population was 222 in 61 households. The following census in 2011 counted 169 people in 58 households. The 2016 census measured the population of the village as 201 people in 64 households.
