= Rud Pish Rural District =

Rural district in Gilan province, Iran

Rud Pish Rural District Persian: دهستان رودپيش
- Rural District
- Location within Iran
- Coordinates: 37°14′N 49°22′E
- Country: Iran
- Province: Gilan
- County: Fuman
- District: Central
- Established: 1987
- Capital: Rud Pish

Population (2016)
  - Total: 12,136
- Time zone: UTC+3:30 (IRST)

Rud Pish Rural District (Persian: دهستان رودپيش) is in the Central District of Fuman County, Gilan province, Iran. Its capital is the village of Rud Pish.

== Demographics ==
=== Population ===
At the time of the 2006 National Census, the rural district's population was 14,666 in 3,910 households. There were 13,202 inhabitants in 4,088 households at the following census of 2011. The 2016 census measured the population of the rural district as 12,136 in 4,236 households. The most populous of its 28 villages was Rud Pish, with 2,140 people.

=== Other villages in the rural district ===
- Ala Sar
- Chiran
- Giga Sar
- Gol Afzan
- Gorbeh Kucheh
- Gushlavandan
- Halqeh Sara
- Khatib Gurab
- Khesmakh
- Khoda Shahr
- Khorram Bisheh
- Kiaban
- Kohneh Gurab
- Kordabad
- Ladmokh
- Maaf Mahalleh
- Makhsar
- Malavan
- Mir Mahalleh
- Molla Kuh
- Neqareh Chiyan
- Now Deh
- Pish Deh
- Sang Bijar
- Send-e Bala
- Send-e Pain
- Tazehabad-e Kalashem
