= Wazirabad, Delhi =

Wazirabad
- Suburban & Village
- Location in North Delhi, India Wazirabad (India)
- Coordinates: 28.728°N 77.222°E
- Country: India
- Territory: Delhi (National Capital Region)
- Region: North India

Languages
  - Official: Hindi, Khariboli
- Time zone: UTC+5:30 (IST)
- PIN: 110084

For other places with the same name, see Wazirabad (disambiguation)

Wazirabad, near Wazirabad barrage is a village & suburban in Delhi in the Nation Capital Region. It lies in the Civil Lines subdivision of the North Delhi district. Its pincode is 110084. It is a Gateway of East Delhi and Ghaziabad (Uttat Pradesh). Signature Bridge is also located in Wazirabad. Nearest metro station is Jagatpur - Wazirabad metro station on Pink Line of Phase IV of Delhi Metro is Opened on 8, March, 2026.
