= Khoshknudhan-e Pain =

Village in Gilan province, Iran

Khoshknudhan-e Pain Persian: خشكنودهان پايين
- Village
- Location within Iran
- Coordinates: 37°15′19″N 49°14′43″E
- Country: Iran
- Province: Gilan
- County: Fuman
- District: Central
- Rural District: Lulaman

Population (2016)
  - Total: 988
- Time zone: UTC+3:30 (IRST)

Khoshknudhan-e Pain (Persian: خشكنودهان پايين) (Note: Also romanized as Khoshk Now Dehān-e Pā’īn and Khoshknūdhān-e Pā’īn; also known as Arbākaleh, Gushkudagane, Khoshk Nowdahān, Khoshk Nowdehān, and Khoshknowdehān) is a village in Lulaman Rural District of the Central District in Fuman County, Gilan province, Iran.

== Demographics ==
=== Population ===
At the time of the 2006 National Census, the village's population was 1,243 in 327 households. The following census in 2011 counted 1,090 people in 324 households. The 2016 census measured the population of the village as 988 people in 343 households.
