= Khosrowabad, Arzuiyeh =

Khosrowabad خسرواباد
- Village
- Location within Iran
- Coordinates: 28°38′30″N 56°32′47″E
- Country: Iran
- Province: Kerman
- County: Arzuiyeh
- Bakhsh: Central
- Rural District: Dehsard

Population (2006)
  - Total: 293
- Time zone: UTC+3:30 (IRST)
  - Summer (DST): UTC+4:30 (IRDT)

Khosrowabad (Persian: خسرواباد, also Romanized as Khosrowābād) is a village in the Dehsard Rural District, in the Central District of Arzuiyeh County, Kerman Province, Iran. As of the 2006 census, its population was 293, with 63 families.
