= Khosrowabad, Kermanshah =

Khosroabad خسرواباد
- Village
- Location within Iran
- Coordinates: 34°11′10″N 46°21′41″E
- Country: Iran
- Province: Kermanshah
- County: Dalahu
- Bakhsh: Central
- Rural District: Howmeh-ye Kerend

Population (2006)
  - Total: 491
- Time zone: UTC+3:30 (IRST)
  - Summer (DST): UTC+4:30 (IRDT)

Khosroabad (Persian: خسرواباد, also Romanized as Khosrowābād; also known as Khūsrauābād) is a village in Howmeh-ye Kerend Rural District, in the Central District of Dalahu County, Kermanshah Province, Iran. At the 2006 census, its population was 491, in 106 families.
