= Khosrowabad, Kuhrang =

Khosrowabad خسرواباد
- Village
- Location within Iran
- Coordinates: 32°30′25″N 50°08′19″E
- Country: Iran
- Province: Chaharmahal and Bakhtiari
- County: Kuhrang
- Bakhsh: Central
- Rural District: Shurab-e Tangazi

Population (2006)
  - Total: 140
- Time zone: UTC+3:30 (IRST)
  - Summer (DST): UTC+4:30 (IRDT)

Khosrowabad (Persian: خسرواباد, also Romanized as Khosrowābād) is a village in Shurab-e Tangazi Rural District, in the Central District of Kuhrang County, Chaharmahal and Bakhtiari Province, Iran. At the 2006 census, its population was 140, in 28 families. The village is populated by Lurs.
