= Khosrowabad-e Amjadi =

Khosrowabad-e Amjadi خسروابادامجدي
- Village
- Location within Iran
- Coordinates: 34°56′24″N 47°21′40″E
- Country: Iran
- Province: Kermanshah
- County: Sonqor
- Bakhsh: Kolyai
- Rural District: Agahan

Population (2006)
  - Total: 223
- Time zone: UTC+3:30 (IRST)
  - Summer (DST): UTC+4:30 (IRDT)

Khosrowabad-e Amjadi (Persian: خسروابادامجدي, also Romanized as Khosrowābād-e Amjadī) is a village in Agahan Rural District, Kolyai District, Sonqor County, Kermanshah Province, Iran. At the 2006 census, its population was 223, in 54 families.
