= Khosrowabad, Lordegan =

Khosrowabad خسروآباد
- Village
- Location within Iran
- Coordinates: 31°26′48″N 51°09′21″E
- Country: Iran
- Province: Chaharmahal and Bakhtiari
- County: Khanmirza
- Bakhsh: Central
- Rural District: Javanmardi

Population (2016)
  - Total: 274
- Time zone: UTC+3:30 (IRST)

Khosrowabad (Persian: خسروآباد, also Romanized as Khosrowābād) is a village in Javanmardi Rural District, Khanmirza County, Chaharmahal and Bakhtiari Province, Iran.

The village is populated by Lurs.

== Population ==
At the time of the 2006 National Census, the village's population was 267 in 59 households, when it was in the former Khanmirza District of Lordegan County. The following census in 2011 counted 285 people in 67 households. The 2016 census measured the population of the village as 274 people in 78 households.

In 2019, the district was separated from the county in the establishment of Khanmirza County, and the rural district was transferred to the new Central District.
