= Vazirabad, Afghanistan =

Vazirabad
- Location in Afghanistan
- Coordinates: 36°50′0″N 66°50′44″E
- Country: Afghanistan
- Province: Balkh Province
- Time zone: + 4.30

Vazirabad is a village in Balkh Province in northern Afghanistan.

== See also ==
- Balkh Province
