= Khosrowabad, Gilan =

Village in Gilan province, Iran

Khosrowabad Persian: خسروآباد
- Village
- Location within Iran
- Coordinates: 37°08′19″N 49°19′16″E
- Country: Iran
- Province: Gilan
- County: Fuman
- District: Central
- Rural District: Gurab Pas

Population (2016)
  - Total: 518
- Time zone: UTC+3:30 (IRST)

Khosrowabad (Persian: خسروآباد) (Note: Also romanized as Khosrowābād; also known as Husruābād and Khusruabad) is a village in Gurab Pas Rural District of the Central District in Fuman County, Gilan province, Iran.

== Demographics ==
=== Population ===
At the time of the 2006 National Census, the village's population was 621 in 168 households. The following census in 2011 counted 545 people in 169 households. The 2016 census measured the population of the village as 518 people in 183 households.
