= Vazirabad, Ilam =

Vazirabad وزيراباد
- Village
- Location within Iran
- Coordinates: 33°10′06″N 47°21′57″E
- Country: Iran
- Province: Ilam
- County: Darreh Shahr
- Bakhsh: Central
- Rural District: Zarrin Dasht

Population (2006)
  - Total: 603
- Time zone: UTC+3:30 (IRST)
  - Summer (DST): UTC+4:30 (IRDT)

Vazirabad (Persian: وزيراباد, also Romanized as Vazīrābād) is a village in Zarrin Dasht Rural District, in the Central District of Darreh Shahr County, Ilam Province, Iran. At the 2006 census, its population was 603, in 117 families. The village is populated by Kurds.
