= Khosrowabad, Qazvin =

Khosrowabad خسرواباد
- Village
- Location within Iran
- Coordinates: 35°30′38″N 49°18′54″E
- Country: Iran
- Province: Qazvin
- County: Avaj
- Bakhsh: Central
- Rural District: Shahidabad

Population (2006)
  - Total: 239
- Time zone: UTC+3:30 (IRST)

Khosrowabad (Persian: خسرواباد, also Romanized as Khosrowābād) is a village in Shahidabad Rural District, Central District, Avaj County, Qazvin Province, Iran. At the 2006 census, its population was 239, in 65 families.
