= Vazirabad, Lorestan =

Vazirabad وزيراباد
- Village
- Location within Iran
- Coordinates: 33°50′10″N 48°45′33″E
- Country: Iran
- Province: Lorestan
- County: Borujerd
- Bakhsh: Central
- Rural District: Hemmatabad

Population (2006)
  - Total: 215
- Time zone: UTC+3:30 (IRST)
  - Summer (DST): UTC+4:30 (IRDT)

Vazirabad (Persian: وزيراباد, also romanized as Vazīrābād) is a village in Hemmatabad Rural District, in the Central District of Borujerd County, Lorestan Province, Iran. At the 2006 census its population was 215, in 50 families.
