= Khosrowabad, Kazerun =

Khosrowabad خسروآباد
- Village
- Location within Iran
- Coordinates: 29°39′08″N 51°36′15″E
- Country: Iran
- Province: Fars
- County: Kazerun
- Bakhsh: Central
- Rural District: Deris

Population (2006)
  - Total: 1,118
- Time zone: UTC+3:30 (IRST)
  - Summer (DST): UTC+4:30 (IRDT)

Khosrowabad (Persian: خسروآباد, also Romanized as Khosrowābād; also known as Khosroābād) is a village in Deris Rural District, in the Central District of Kazerun County, Fars province, Iran. At the 2006 census, its population was 1,118, in 237 families.
