= Vazirabad, Fars =

Vazirabad وزيراباد
- Village
- Location within Iran
- Coordinates: 29°32′16″N 52°37′17″E
- Country: Iran
- Province: Fars
- County: Shiraz
- Bakhsh: Central
- Rural District: Qarah Bagh

Population (2006)
  - Total: 2,977
- Time zone: UTC+3:30 (IRST)
  - Summer (DST): UTC+4:30 (IRDT)

Vazirabad (Persian: وزيراباد, also Romanized as Vazīrābād; also known as Khosrowābād) is a village in Qarah Bagh Rural District, in the Central District of Shiraz County, Fars province, Iran. At the 2006 census, its population was 2,977, in 653 families.
