= Khosrowabad-e Faleh Gori =

Khosrowabad-e Faleh Gori خسروابادفعله گري
- Village
- Location within Iran
- Coordinates: 34°57′40″N 47°47′09″E
- Country: Iran
- Province: Kermanshah
- County: Sonqor
- Bakhsh: Central
- Rural District: Bavaleh

Population (2006)
  - Total: 127
- Time zone: UTC+3:30 (IRST)
  - Summer (DST): UTC+4:30 (IRDT)

Khosrowabad-e Faleh Gori (Persian: خسروابادفعله گري, also Romanized as Khosrowābād-e Fa‘leh Gorī; also known as Khosrowābād, Khosrowābād-e Fa‘leh Korī, and Khūsrūābād) is a village in Bavaleh Rural District, in the Central District of Sonqor County, Kermanshah Province, Iran. At the 2006 census, its population was 127, in 24 families.
