= Gurab Pas Rural District =

Rural district in Gilan province, Iran

Gurab Pas Rural District Persian: دهستان گوراب پس
- Rural District
- Location within Iran
- Coordinates: 37°06′N 49°13′E
- Country: Iran
- Province: Gilan
- County: Fuman
- District: Central
- Established: 1987
- Capital: Gurab Pas

Population (2016)
  - Total: 9,007
- Time zone: UTC+3:30 (IRST)

Gurab Pas Rural District (Persian: دهستان گوراب پس) is in the Central District of Fuman County, Gilan province, Iran. Its capital is the village of Gurab Pas.

== Demographics ==
=== Population ===
At the time of the 2006 National Census, the rural district's population was 11,312 in 2,980 households. There were 10,207 inhabitants in 3,174 households at the following census of 2011. The 2016 census measured the population of the rural district as 9,007 in 3,090 households. The most populous of its 22 villages was Gurab Pas, with 1,433 people.

=== Other villages in the rural district ===
- Azbar
- Fusheh
- Gasht-e Rudkhan
- Heydar Alat
- Khosrowabad
- Maleskam
- Qaleh Rudkhan
- Seyyedabad
- Tang Darreh
