= Gasht Rural District (Fuman County) =

Rural district in Gilan province, Iran

Gasht Rural District Persian: دهستان گشت
- Rural District
- Location within Iran
- Coordinates: 37°12′N 49°17′E
- Country: Iran
- Province: Gilan
- County: Fuman
- District: Central
- Established: 1987
- Capital: Gasht

Population (2016)
  - Total: 14,514
- Time zone: UTC+3:30 (IRST)

Gasht Rural District (Persian: دهستان گشت) is in the Central District of Fuman County, Gilan province, Iran. Its capital is the village of Gasht.

== Demographics ==
=== Population ===
At the time of the 2006 National Census, the rural district's population was 16,781 in 4,440 households. There were 16,031 inhabitants in 4,767 households at the following census of 2011. The 2016 census measured the population of the rural district as 14,514 in 4,873 households. The most populous of its 28 villages was Kord Mahalleh, with 1,945 people.

=== Other villages in the rural district ===
- Buin
- Darbagh
- Hoseynabad
- Pish Hesar
- Qaleh Kol
- Serabostan
- Shekal Gurab-e Bala
- Shulam
