= Central District (Fuman County) =

District in Gilan province, Iran

Central District (Fuman County) Persian: بخش مرکزی شهرستان فومن
- District
- Location within Iran
- Coordinates: 37°09′N 49°15′E
- Country: Iran
- Province: Gilan
- County: Fuman
- Capital: Fuman

Population (2016)
  - Total: 80,120
- Time zone: UTC+3:30 (IRST)

The Central District of Fuman County (Persian: بخش مرکزی شهرستان فومن) is in Iran's northwestern Gilan province. Its capital is the city of Fuman.

== Demographics ==
=== Population ===
At the time of the 2006 National Census, the district's population was 81,449 in 21,913 households. The following census in 2011 counted 80,000 people in 24,399 households. The 2016 census measured the population of the district as 80,120 inhabitants in 27,038 households.

=== Administrative divisions ===
Central District (Fuman County) Population
| Administrative Divisions | 2006 | 2011 | 2016 |
|---|---|---|---|
| Gasht RD | 16,781 | 16,031 | 14,514 |
| Gurab Pas RD | 11,312 | 10,207 | 9,007 |
| Lulaman RD | 10,927 | 9,952 | 8,622 |
| Rud Pish RD | 14,666 | 13,202 | 12,136 |
| Fuman (city) | 27,763 | 30,608 | 35,841 |
| Total | 81,449 | 80,000 | 80,120 |
RD = Rural District
