= Samar Ishaq =

Pakistani footballer (born 1986)

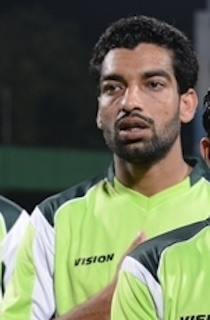
- Ishaq with Pakistan in 2013

Personal information
- Date of birth: January 1, 1986 (age 40)
- Place of birth: Faisalabad, Pakistan
- Height: 1.68 m (5 ft 6 in)
- Position: Defender

Youth career
- 2002–2003: Panther Club

Senior career*
Years	Team	Apps	(Gls)
2003–2006	Panther Club	52	(0)
2006–2016	Khan Research Laboratories	218	(0)
Total		270	(0)

International career
2006–2010	Pakistan U23		
2005–2013	Pakistan	44	(3)

Managerial career
- 2026: Khan Research Laboratories
Medal record
Representing Pakistan
Winner	South Asian Games	2006
Khan Research Laboratories
Runner-up	National Challenge Cup	2008
Winner	National Challenge Cup	2009
Winner	National Challenge Cup	2010
Winner	National Challenge Cup	2011
Winner	National Challenge Cup	2012
Winner	National Challenge Cup	2015
Winner	National Challenge Cup	2016
- * Club domestic league appearances and goals

Samar Ishaq (born January 1, 1986) is a Pakistani former footballer who played as a defender. Ishaq captained the Pakistan national team in the 2010s.

== Club career ==
=== Panther Club ===
Ishaq made his professional debut in 2004–05 Pakistan Premier League with Panther Club of his hometown Faisalabad, finishing the season in relegation zone at 11th position with 30 points, but avoided relegation due to Allied Bank who had finished in 8th position dissolving their team at the end of the season.

The team got relegated in the next 2005–06 season, finishing 11th again, with 20 points. Ishaq scored his first goal for Panther Club in a 5–0 victory over City Football Club from Lahore in 2005 National Challenge Cup on 11 June 2005, scoring the second goal of the match and his team in the 47th minute. Ishaq scored his second goal of the tournament in the 73rd minute against Wohaib, a game which Wohaib drew 2–2 in the last 10 minutes after trailing 2–0. In the second stage of the tournament, Panther Club ended at the bottom of the table and got knocked out of the tournament.

=== Khan Research Laboratories ===
Ishaq joined Khan Research Laboratories at the start of 2006–07 season. Ishaq was a regular in the starting eleven throughout the season as Khan Research Laboratories finished 3rd, conceding only 12 goals in 20 games.

In the 2007–08 season, Ishaq scored his first goal with KRL on 5 January 2008 in the 4–1 win against Pakistan Airlines, scoring the equaliser after Shakir Lashari gave the lead to Pakistan Airlines in the 11th minute. Ishaq again ended 3rd with Khan Research Laboratories, as his side had the second best defense of the league behind Pakistan Army, who conceded 10 goals as compared to 13 of Khan Research Laboratories.

The 2008–09 season saw Ishaq winning his first silverware, as Khan Research Laboratories won the 2009 National Football Challenge Cup, defeating Pakistan Airlines 1–0 in the finals, thanks to a 64th-minute goal by Muhammad Qasim. However they finished third in the league again behind league winners and runners-up WAPDA and Pakistan Army respectively.

In 2009–10 season, Ishaq and Khan Research Laboratories won their first ever league national title, as they won the league on goal difference, finishing first with a goal difference of +32 as compared to +22 of Pakistan Army after both teams ended the season with 60 points. Ishaq with his team conceded only 8 goals in 26 matches. He scored his first goal of the season in a 2–0 win over National Bank on 7 August 2009, as he opened the scoring in the 63rd minute. On 4 October 2009, Ishaq scored the lone goal in the 90+1 minute as Khan Research Laboratories defeated Pak Elektron 1–0. Ishaq and Khan Research Laboratories went on to achieve the double and they also successfully defended the National Challenge Cup. Ishaq scored the fastest goal of the 2010 National Football Challenge Cup, when he scored the goal in the 2nd minute of the match in the finals, as his team went on to defeat Pakistan Navy 4–0, with Kaleemullah Khan, Zubair Ahmed and Abid Ghafoor scoring in the 22nd, 63rd and 77th minutes respectively.

Ishaq finished second in the 2010–11 Pakistan Premier League after WAPDA topped the league, 9 points clear of Khan Research Laboratories, although Khan Research Laboratories had the best defense of the season conceding only 16 goals in 20 matches. Ishaq scored his only goal of the season against Pakistan Army on 20 September 2010, converting a penalty in the 56th minute. Ishaq however, won his and his team's third consecutive National Challenge Cup title as they defeated Karachi Electric Supply Corporation 1–0 in the finals held at Ishaq's hometown of Faisalabad. Ishaq scored his only goal of the tournament in the group stage in a 2–0 win over Habib Bank.

Ishaq became the captain of Khan Research Laboratories, at the 2011–12 season, as they went on to achieve the double once again. He won the league as Khan Research Laboratories finished at the top of the table, 20 points clear of surprise runners-up Afghan Chaman. This was the first time in the Pakistan Premier League that the league was won by any team with 6 games remaining to play. He was again declared player of the season. Ishaq won the 2012 National Football Challenge Cup 3–1 on penalties after the match stayed 0–0 after extra-time, Ishaq's missed his penalty after hitting the post.

Ishaq won his third league and second consecutive title, as they went on to win the 2012–13 Pakistan Premier League, courtesy of Kaleemullah Khan who scored 35 goals in 30 games, most in the history of Pakistan Premier League. Ishaq scored his first league goal of the season on 5 January 2013, after scoring a penalty in the 77th minute against Karachi Port Trust 2–1. Ishaq missed the decisive penalty in a quarter-finals match against National Bank in the 2013 National Football Challenge Cup, causing them to crash out of the tournament. He was captain of the team which reached the 2013 AFC President's Cup final, after falling to Turkmen club Balkan FT by 0–1 in the final.

== International career ==
Ishaq was first called by the Pakistan national team during the 2005 South Asian Football Federation Gold Cup. Ishaq won the 2006 South Asian Games with the Pakistan under 23 national team. He subsequently played at the 2007 AFC Asian Cup qualifiers against Jordan, which was hosted in the Amman International Stadium. He also participated at the 2010 Asian Games with the under-23 side.

In 2011, Ishaq was named captain of the senior national team for the 2012 AFC Challenge Cup qualification, with Abdul Aziz as vice-captain. At the 2011 SAFF Championship at the end of the year, Ishaq acted as vice-captain after goalkeeper Jaffar Khan. Due to injury of Jaffar Khan, Ishaq again led the national side in 2013 for a friendly against Afghanistan. He retained his captaincy in the consequent 2013 SAFF Championship. In the tournament, he scored an own goal in the second match against India in a one-nil defeat, and scored a goal against Bangladesh in a 2–1 victory, as Pakistan failed to pass the group stages.

== Coaching career ==
After his retirement in 2016, Ishaq along with Kamran Khan joined KRL's coaching panel as assistant coaches. He was appointed head coach of KRL at the 2026 National Football Challenge Cup.

== Career statistics ==
=== International ===
Appearances and goals by national team and year
National team	Year	Apps	Goals
Pakistan	2006	9	0
Pakistan	2007	2	0
Pakistan	2008	8	1
Pakistan	2009	5	0
Pakistan	2011	8	1
Pakistan	2012	1	0
Pakistan	2013	11	1
Total		44	3

Scores and results list Pakistan's goal tally first, score column indicates score after each Ishaq goal.

List of international goals scored by Samar Ishaq
No.	Date	Venue	Opponent	Score	Result	Competition
1	June 7, 2008	Rasmee Dhandu Stadium, Malé, Maldives	Nepal	1–2	1–4	2008 SAFF Championship
2	December 6, 2011	Jawaharlal Nehru Stadium, New Delhi, India	Nepal	1–1	1–1	2011 SAFF Championship
3	September 5, 2013	Halchowk Stadium, Kathmandu, Nepal	Bangladesh	1–1	2–1	2013 SAFF Championship

== Honours ==
=== Pakistan U23 ===
- South Asian Games Gold: 2006

=== Khan Research Laboratories ===
- Pakistan Premier League: 2009–10, 2011–12, 2012–13, 2013–14
- National Football Challenge Cup: 2009, 2010, 2011, 2012, 2015, 2016

=== Individual ===
- Premier League Player of the Year: 2008–09, 2011–12

== See also ==
- List of Pakistan national football team captains
