= 2013 National Challenge Cup =

Tournament details
- Country: Pakistan
- Venue: Bahawalpur
- Dates: 15 May – 26 May
- Teams: 16

Final positions
- Champions: National Bank (2nd title)
- Runners-up: Karachi Electric Supply Corporation
- Third place: Pakistan Airforce
- Fourth place: WAPDA

Tournament statistics
- Matches played: 32
- Goals scored: 92 (2.88 per match)
- Top goal scorer: Kaleemullah Khan (8 goals)

Awards
- Best player Best goalkeeper: Muhammad Mujahid (Pakistan Airforce); Muhammad Omar (National Bank)
- All statistics correct as of 26 May 2013.

The 2013 National Challenge Cup was the 23rd season of National Challenge Cup, the main cup competition in Pakistani football.

A total of 16 clubs entered the competition that was held from 15 to 26 May 2018. Bahawalpur were the hosts for the tournament, thus earning DFA Bahawalpur a spot in the tournament, courtesy of being the hosts.

Khan Research Laboratories, the defending champions, were knocked out in quarter finals, losing 5–4 on penalties to the eventual winners National Bank.

National Bank defeated Karachi Electric Supply Corporation 1–0 in the finals. This was the first major trophy for National Bank since 1993, when they had won the National Challenge Cup.

== Teams ==
The 16 participating teams are as below:

- Khan Research Laboratories^{TH,} ^{PPL}
- WAPDA
- DFA Bahawalpur ^{H}
- Pakistan Army
- Karachi Electric Supply Corporation
- Pakistan Airlines
- Pakistan Airforce
- National Bank
- Habib Bank
- Pak Afghan Clearing
- Sui Southern Gas
- Ashraf Sugar Mills
- National U-18
- Bhatti United
- Higher Education Commission
- Pakistan Police

Notes
TH = Challenge Cup title holders; PPL = Pakistan Premier League winners; H = Host

== Group stages ==
=== Group A ===
Pos	Team	Pld	W	D	L	GF	GA	GD	Pts	Qualification
1	Khan Research Laboratories	3	2	0	1	10	2	+8	6	Advance to Knockout round
2	Pak Afghan Clearing	3	1	1	1	3	5	−2	4	Advance to Knockout round
3	Ashraf Sugar Mills	3	1	1	1	5	10	−5	4	
4	Habib Bank	3	0	2	1	1	2	−1	2	

Updated to match(es) played on 15 May 2013. Source:
16 May 2013
19:00 PST

Khan Research Laboratories	8–0	Ashraf Sugar Mills
Kaleemullah Khan 21', 26', 30', 54', 66', 77'; Saeed Ahmed 41', 45'

Ground No. 1 Dring Stadium, Bahawalpur
16 May 2013
19:00 PST

Pak Afghan Clearing	0–0	Habib Bank

Ground No. 2 Dring Stadium, Bahawalpur

18 May 2013
19:00 PST

Pak Afghan Clearing	2–1	Khan Research Laboratories
Abdul Hadi 19'; Sirajuddin 45'		Kaleemullah Khan 69'

Ground No. 1 Dring Stadium, Bahawalpur
18 May 2013
19:00 PST

Habib Bank	1–1	Ashraf Sugar Mills

Ground No. 2 Dring Stadium, Bahawalpur

20 May 2013
19:00 PST

Khan Research Laboratories	1–0	Habib Bank
Kaleemullah Khan 38'

Ground No. 1 Dring Stadium, Bahawalpur
18 May 2013
19:00 PST

Ashraf Sugar Mills	4–1	Pak Afghan Clearing
Azeem 41'; Shehbaz Ahmed 47', 88'; Naved Khan 53'		Sirajuddin 78'

Ground No. 2 Dring Stadium, Bahawalpur

=== Group B ===
Pos	Team	Pld	W	D	L	GF	GA	GD	Pts	Qualification
1	WAPDA	3	3	0	0	7	1	+6	9	Advance to Knockout round
2	Karachi Electric Supply Corporation	3	2	0	1	4	4	0	6	Advance to Knockout round
3	Sui Southern Gas	3	1	0	2	5	5	0	3	
4	Pakistan Police	3	0	0	3	0	6	−6	0	

Updated to match(es) played on 15 May 2013. Source:
15 May 2013
19:00 PST

Karachi Electric Supply Corporation	1–0	Pakistan Police
Abdus Salam 21'

Ground No. 1 Dring Stadium, Bahawalpur
15 May 2013
19:00 PST

WAPDA	3–0	Sui Southern Gas
Jadeed Khan 5', 68'; M. Afzal 58'

Ground No. 2 Dring Stadium, Bahawalpur

17 May 2013
19:00 PST

Karachi Electric Supply Corporation	2–1	Sui Southern Gas
Umar Farooq 64'; Rasool 68'		Imran 19'

Ground No. 1 Dring Stadium, Bahawalpur
17 May 2013
19:00 PST

Pakistan Police	0–1	WAPDA
		Jadeed Khan 21'

Ground No. 2 Dring Stadium, Bahawalpur

19 May 2013
19:00 PST

WAPDA	3–1	Karachi Electric Supply Corporation
Aurangzeb 45' (o.g.); Jadeed Khan 56'; Manzoor Ahmed 75'		Rasool 10'

Ground No. 1 Dring Stadium, Bahawalpur
19 May 2013
19:00 PST

Sui Southern Gas	4–0	Pakistan Police
Amanullah 15', 84'; Imran 44'; Jehanzeb 74'

Ground No. 2 Dring Stadium, Bahawalpur

=== Group C ===
Pos	Team	Pld	W	D	L	GF	GA	GD	Pts	Qualification
1	National under-18	3	2	1	0	6	1	+5	7	Advance to Knockout round
2	Pakistan Army	3	2	0	1	7	3	+4	6	Advance to Knockout round
3	Pakistan Airlines	3	1	1	1	3	3	0	4	
4	Bhatti United	3	0	0	3	3	12	−9	0	

Updated to match(es) played on 15 May 2013. Source:
16 May 2013
21:45 PST

Pakistan Airlines	0–0	National under-18

Ground No. 1 Dring Stadium, Bahawalpur
16 May 2013
21:45 PST

Pakistan Army	5–1	Bhatti United
Ansar Abbas 16', 25', 35' (pen.); Zafarullah Javed 39'; M. Arif 70'		M. Yasir 52'

Ground No. 2 Dring Stadium, Bahawalpur

18 May 2013
21:45 PST

National under-18	1–0	Pakistan Army
Mansoor Khan 50'

Ground No. 1 Dring Stadium, Bahawalpur
18 May 2013
21:45 PST

Pakistan Airlines	2–1	Bhatti United
Riaz Ahmed 31'; Shakir 53'		M. Yasir 50'

Ground No. 2 Dring Stadium, Bahawalpur

20 May 2013
21:45 PST

National under-18	5–2	Bhatti United
M. Riaz 11'; Mansoor Khan 20' (pen.)		Adnan Butt 26'; M. Yasir 61'

Ground No. 1 Dring Stadium, Bahawalpur
20 May 2013
21:45 PST

Pakistan Army	2–1	Pakistan Airlines
Tanvir Shahid 47'; Zafarullah Javed 82'		Shakir 89'

Ground No. 2 Dring Stadium, Bahawalpur

=== Group D ===
Pos	Team	Pld	W	D	L	GF	GA	GD	Pts	Qualification
1	Pakistan Airforce	3	3	0	0	13	2	+11	9	Advance to Knockout round
2	National Bank	3	2	0	1	7	3	+4	6	Advance to Knockout round
3	Higher Education Commission	3	1	0	2	7	5	+2	3	
4	DFA Bahawalpur	3	0	0	3	1	18	−17	0	

Updated to match(es) played on 15 May 2013. Source:
15 May 2013
21:45 PST

Pakistan Airforce	2–1	Higher Education Commission
Irfan Ali 34'; M. Asif 45'		Rashid Masih 64'

Ground No. 1 Dring Stadium, Bahawalpur
15 May 2013
19:00 PST

National Bank	4–0	DFA Bahawalpur
Attiqullah 25'; A. Aziz 58'; Faisal Iqbal 62'; M. Ashfaq 85'

Ground No. 2 Dring Stadium, Bahawalpur

17 May 2013
21:45 PST

National Bank	2–0	Higher Education Commission
Faisal Iqbal 30'; Farooq Shah 89'

Ground No. 1 Dring Stadium, Bahawalpur
17 May 2013
19:00 PST

DFA Bahawalpur	0–8	Pakistan Airforce
		Irfan Ali 20', 21', 48', 58'; Arif Nawaz 36', 78'; M. Mujahid 75'; Rafiullah 87'

Ground No. 2 Dring Stadium, Bahawalpur

19 May 2013
21:45 PST

DFA Bahawalpur	1–6	Higher Education Commission
Arsalaan 72'		Umair Ali 46', 48', 52', 59', 78', 85'

Ground No. 1 Dring Stadium, Bahawalpur
19 May 2013
19:00 PST

Pakistan Airforce	3–1	National Bank
M. Arif 23', 90'; M. Mujahid 52'		M. Asif 27'

Ground No. 2 Dring Stadium, Bahawalpur

== Knockout round ==
=== Quarter finals ===
21 May 2013
19:00 PST

WAPDA	1–0	Pakistan Army
M. Ahmed 60'

Ground No. 1 Dring Stadium, Bahawalpur

21 May 2013
19:00 PST

Karachi Electric Supply Corporation	1–0 (a.e.t.)	National under-18
M. Rasool 110'

Ground No. 2 Dring Stadium, Bahawalpur

22 May 2013
19:00 PST

National Bank	1–1 (a.e.t.)	Khan Research Laboratories
M. Asif 20'		Adil 15'
Penalties
M. Asif (penalty scored); Farooq Shah (penalty scored); Misbah (penalty scored); A. Aziz (penalty scored); Ismail (penalty missed)	4–3	(penalty scored) Zia Us-Salam; (penalty scored) Qasim; (penalty scored) Adil; (penalty missed) Saddam Hussain; (penalty missed) Ishaq

Ground No. 1 Dring Stadium, Bahawalpur

22 May 2013
19:00 PST

Pakistan Airforce	4–0	Pak Afghan Clearing
M. Arif 25'; M. Mujahid 36', 89'; Irfan Ali 78'

Ground No. 2 Dring Stadium, Bahawalpur

=== Semi finals ===
24 May 2013
19:00 PST

WAPDA	0–1	National Bank
		Attiqullah 23'

Ground No. 1 Dring Stadium, Bahawalpur

24 May 2013
19:00 PST

Karachi Electric Supply Corporation	0–0 (a.e.t.)	Pakistan Airforce
Penalties
Essa (penalty scored); Rasool (penalty scored); Umer Farooq (penalty scored); Abdus Salam (penalty scored); Aurangzeb (penalty scored)	5–4	(penalty scored) Irfan Ali; (penalty scored) M. Asif; (penalty scored) M. Mujahid; (penalty scored) Arif Nawaz; (penalty missed) Rafiullah

Ground No. 2 Dring Stadium, Bahawalpur

=== Third place ===
25 May 2013
19:00 PST

WAPDA	0–2	Pakistan Airforce
		M. Mujahid 81', 86'

Ground No. 1 Dring Stadium, Bahawalpur

=== Finals ===
26 May 2013
19:00 PST

National Bank	1–0	Karachi Electric Supply Corporation
M. Asif 81'

Ground No. 1 Dring Stadium, Bahawalpur

== Top scorers ==
As of 26 May 2013

Position	Player	Club	Goals
1	Kaleemullah Khan	Khan Research Laboratories	8
2	Muhammad Mujahid	Pakistan Airforce	6
3	Irfan Ali	Pakistan Airforce	5
4	Jadeed Khan	WAPDA	4
5	Ansar Abbas	Pakistan Army	3
5	Muhammad Yasir	Bhatti United	3
5	Muhammad Rasool	Karachi Electric Supply Corporation	3
