= Jadid Khan Pathan =

Pakistani professional footballer (born 1989)

Jadid Khan
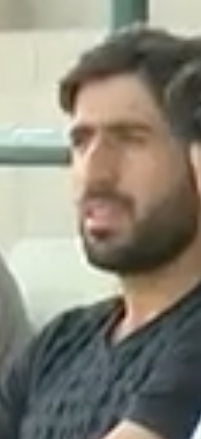
- Khan in 2018

Personal information
- Full name: Jadid Khan Pathan
- Date of birth: January 6, 1989 (age 37)
- Place of birth: Chaman, Pakistan
- Position: Midfielder

Team information
- Current team: Afghan Chaman

Youth career
- 2003–2007: Afghan Chaman

Senior career*
Years	Team	Apps	(Gls)
2007–2013	Afghan Chaman	212	(75)
2013	WAPDA	0	(0)
2014–2016	Afghan Chaman	52	(16)
2015–2018	WAPDA	0	(0)
2017–2019	Sui Southern Gas	17	(1)
2019–	Afghan Chaman		

International career^{‡}
2011	Pakistan U23		
2008–2014	Pakistan	13	(1)
- * Club domestic league appearances and goals ‡ National team caps and goals as of January 11, 2011

Jadid Khan Pathan (born 6 January 1989) is a Pakistani footballer who plays as a midfielder for Pakistan Premier League club Afghan Chaman, which he captains. He has also played for Pakistan at international level, earning his first international cap during the 2008 SAFF Cup against the Maldives. Khan won the Pakistan Premier League Golden Boot in the 2011–12 season, after finishing as top-scorer.

== Early life ==
Khan was born in Chaman, in the Balochistan province of Pakistan. He spent majority of his career playing for his hometown club Afghan Chaman, where he was the team captain from 2008 to 2011.

== Club career ==
=== Afghan Chaman ===
==== 2007–08 ====
Khan made his debut for Afghan Chaman in the 2007–08 season. Khan spent most of his first season as a substitute, he scored his first goal for the club on 3 December 2007, scoring the opening goal in 7th minute in a 2–2 draw against Pakistan Navy. Khan's second goal was also against Pakistan Navy in a reverse fixture on 11 January 2008, with the match ending with another 2–2 scoreline, with Khan scoring the equaliser in the 26th minute after Muhamamd Shahzad gave lead to Pakistan Navy from the spot in the 20th minute. Khan scored three goals in his debut season in 15 appearances, with his last goal coming in a 2–0 victory against Karachi Electric Supply Corporation.

==== 2008–09 ====
Khan was made the captain of the team after one year of joining. Khan scored his first goal of the 2007–08 season 2 months after the start of the season, scoring the opening goal in 51st minute against Karachi Port Trust in a 2–0 victory. Khan's second goal of the season was against Pakistan Navy in a 3–1 loss, where he scored the first goal of the game in 38th minute. On 22 November 2008, Khan his first senior hat-trick against Pakistan Television completing his hat-trick in 15 minutes, scoring his first goal in 61 minute, second in 67th minute and third in 76th minute. Khan ended his 2008–09 season with five goals in 26 appearances.

==== 2009–10 ====
Khan scored only one goal in his 2009–10 against Karachi Electric Supply Corporation in a 3–0 victory on 2 October 2009.

==== 2010–11 ====
After a bad season, Khan started the 2010–11 with an assist and a goal in the game against Karachi Electric Supply Corporation, assisting Moaz Khan for the opening goal in 37th and then scoring in 46th minute from Abdul Nasir's assist. Khan assisted Fazal Rehman to score the equaliser against Pak Elektron. On 14 October 2010, Khan scored his second career hat-trick in a 3–0 away win over Young Blood, scoring the goals in 70th, 81st and 87th minutes. Khan scored his seventh goal of the season against Karachi Port Trust in a 2–2 draw. Khan's eight goal of the season was opener against Habib Bank in a 1–1 draw on 4 November 2010. He provided the assist for Abdul Hadi's consolation goal against Sui Southern Gas in a 2–1 loss. On 10 November 2010, Khan scored his ninth goal of the campaign in a 4–1 win over National Bank, finding the net in 76th minute. Khan ended the campaign with 10 goals in 30 appearances.

==== 2011–12 ====
Khan scored in the opening match of 2011–12 season against PMC Athletico in 13th minute in a 3–0 win. Khan scored his second goal of the season against Pakistan Navy when dribbled past four defenders to score a solo goal in the 38th minute, causing home crowd to shower the player with cash prizes. Khan went on a one and half month goal drought before scoring a brace against Karachi Electric Supply Corporation on 18 September 2011, finding the net 76th minutes to reduce the deficit to 2–1, before scoring his in the 90th minute to draw the game 2–2. Four days later Khan scored the winner against National Bank in 58th minute. Khan scored his brace of the season in a reverse fixture against Karachi Electric Supply Corporation, against whom he scored a brace earlier in season. Khan found the net 39th and 56th minute in a 3–2 win. On 13 December 2011, Khan scored his third career hat-trick away from home against Baloch Nushki in a 1–3 win. Khan scored the equaliser in 30th minute before twice finding the net again on 48th and 76th minute. Three days later Khan scored four goals against Pakistan Police in a 6–0 victory. Khan scored his first goal in 13th minute, second in 50th, third in 56th and fourth in 65th minute. Khan won the golden boot after finishing the season as the top-scorer with 22 goals in 30 appearances, giving his team their highest position ever when they finished second in the league.

==== 2012–13 ====
Khan started the 2012–13 season with a goal in the opening match against local rivals Muslim in a 1–1 draw. Khan scored his third goal against title contenders WAPDA in a 1–1 draw, scoring the goal in 9th minute of the game. Khan then scored against Pakistan Airlines in a narrow 1–0 victory. Khan failed to continue to his good form from last season and ended the league season with 6 goals in 25 appearances.

=== WAPDA ===
==== 2013 ====
During the 2012–13 season Khan joined WAPDA after the end of the league, in 2013 National Football Challenge Cup, Khan scored in the opening game against Sui Southern Gas in 5th minute, Khan completed his brace at 58th minute. Khan then scored against Karachi Electric Supply Corporation in a 3–1 victory in the cup competition. Khan reached the semi-finals where they were knocked-out by eventual winners National Bank.

=== Afghan Chaman ===
==== Second Spell: 2013–2016 ====
Khan returned to his hometown club Afghan Chaman for the 2013–14 season. Khan opened his campaign by scoring in a 2–2 draw against newly promoted Pak Afghan Clearing. A month later, Khan scored his second goal in a 4–3 defeat to Karachi Port Trust, scoring in 29th minute. On 27 November 2013, Khan scored the brace against Karachi Port Trust in a 3–2 victory, avenging the last week's 4–3 to the Portmen. Khan scored the goals in 19th and 76th minute. Khan ended the season with 10 goals in 30 appearances.

Khan scored a brace against Baloch Quetta in 5–1 win in the 2014–15 campaign, finding the net in the 20th and 66th minute.

=== WAPDA ===
==== Second spell: 2016 ====
After no footballing activity in Pakistan since the conclusion of 2014–15 Pakistan Premier League, Khan once again joined WAPDA for 2016 PFF Cup as Afghan Chaman were not participating the national cup competition. Khan scored a hat-trick against Pakistan Navy in the group-stage as WAPDA defeated Pakistan Navy 5–1. Khan found the scored in 12th, 74th and 86th minute. Khan and WAPDA were knocked out in quarter-finals after Khan Research Laboratories defeated them 3–1.

=== Sui Southern Gas ===
==== 2017–2019 ====
In 2017, Khan joined newly promoted Sui Southern Gas after getting frustrated with life at Afghan Chaman. He was signed by former national team coach Tariq Lutfi.

=== Return to Afghan Chaman ===
Khan returned to Afghan Chaman in 2019, helping the side winning the Balochistan Football Cup organised by Ufone as captain, after winning in the final against Khuzdar club Jallawan FC. His goal in the semi-finals against Afghan FC Pishin at the 45th minute in a 1–0 victory sealed the club's place to the final.

== International career ==
On 6 April 2009, Khan scored his first goal for Pakistan in 2010 AFC Challenge Cup qualification against Brunei in a 6–0 win at Sugathadasa Stadium, Colombo. Khan scored the second goal of the match in 31st minute. In 2011, Khan led the Pakistan under-23 team as captain at the 2012 Summer Olympics Qualifiers against Malaysia and in test matches against Palestine. Khan also played for his country in a 1–1 draw against Nepal in the 2011 SAFF where he was substituted in the beginning of the first half, Pakistan finished third in Group B. Furthermore, he also played in 2012 AFC Challenge Cup qualifications, he was substituted off against Chinese Taipei on 38th minute due to injury. In 2013, Khan was part of the national squad in 2014 AFC Challenge Cup qualifications, as an unused substitution throughout the tournament.

== Career statistics ==
=== Club ===
As of 1 June 2018.

Appearances and goals by club, season and competition
Club	Season	League			Cup		Total	
Club	Season	Division	Apps	Goals	Apps	Goals	Apps	Goals
Afghan Chaman	2007–08	Pakistan Premier League	15	3	—	—	15	3
Afghan Chaman	2008–09	Pakistan Premier League	26	5	—	—	26	5
Afghan Chaman	2009–10	Pakistan Premier League	30	1	—	—	30	1
Afghan Chaman	2010–11	Pakistan Premier League	30	10	—	—	30	10
Afghan Chaman	2011–12	Pakistan Premier League	30	22	—	—	30	22
Afghan Chaman	2012–13	Pakistan Premier League	26	6	—	—	26	6
Afghan Chaman	Total		157	47	—	—	157	47
WAPDA	2013	Pakistan Premier League	—	—	6	3	6	3
WAPDA	Total		—	—	6	3	6	3
Afghan Chaman	2013–14	Pakistan Premier League	30	10	—	—	30	10
Afghan Chaman	2014–15	Pakistan Premier League	22	6	—	—	22	6
Afghan Chaman	Total		52	16	—	—	52	16
WAPDA	2015–16	Pakistan Premier League	—	—	4	3	4	3
WAPDA	Total		—	—	4	3	4	3
Sui Southern Gas	2018–19	Pakistan Premier League	17	1	1	0	18	1
Sui Southern Gas	Total		17	1	0	0	17	1
Career total			226	64	11	7	237	71

=== International ===
Appearances and goals by national team and year
National team	Year	Apps	Goals
Pakistan	2008	1	0
Pakistan	2009	8	1
Pakistan	2011	4	0
Total		13	1

Scores and results list Pakistan's goal tally first, score column indicates score after each Khan goal.

List of international goals scored by Jadid Khan Pathan
No.	Date	Venue	Opponent	Score	Result	Competition
1	6 April 2009	Sugathadasa Stadium, Colombo, Sri Lanka	Brunei	2–0	6–0	2010 AFC Challenge Cup qualification
