= Saddam Hussain (footballer) =

Pakistani footballer (born 1993)

Personal information
- Full name: Saddam Hussain
- Date of birth: 10 April 1993 (age 33)
- Place of birth: Karachi, Pakistan
- Height: 1.72 m (5 ft 8 in)
- Position: Defensive midfielder

Team information
- Current team: Kajaanin Haka

Youth career
- Malir Shaheen FC

Senior career*
| Years | Team | Apps | (Gls) |
| 2009–2011 | Pakistan Airlines | 49 | (19) |
| 2011–2014 | Khan Research Laboratories | 97 | (38) |
| 2014–2015 | Dordoi Bishkek | 10 | (2) |
| 2015–2016 | Isa Town FC | 20 | (0) |
| 2016–2017 | K-Electric | | |
| 2017–2018 | Gençler Birliği | 30 | (2) |
| 2018–2022 | Sui Southern Gas | 18 | (0) |
| 2023–2024 | Salalah | | |
| 2025– | Kajaanin Haka | | |

International career^{‡}
| 2009 | Pakistan U20 | 3 | (0) |
| 2010–2018 | Pakistan U23 | 18 | (3) |
| 2011–2018 | Pakistan | 23 | (0) |
Medal record
Pakistan International Airlines
| Runner-up | Challenge Cup | 2009 |
| Third place | Pakistan Premier League | 2010 |
Khan Research Laboratories
| Winner | Pakistan Premier League | 2012 |
| Winner | Challenge Cup | 2012 |
| Runner-up | AFC President's Cup | 2013 |
| Winner | Pakistan Premier League | 2013 |
Dordoi Bishkek
| Winner | Kyrgyzstan League | 2014 |
| Winner | Kyrgyzstan Cup | 2014 |
| Winner | Kyrgyzstan Super Cup | 2014 |
| Winner | Ala-Too Cup | 2015 |
Pakistan
| Third place | Philippine Peace Cup | 2013 |
- * Club domestic league appearances and goals as of 18:41, 22 March 2019 (UTC) ‡ National team caps and goals as of 21:47, 24 March 2019 (UTC)

Saddam Hussain (Urdu: صدام حسين; born 10 April 1993) is a Pakistani professional footballer who plays as a defensive midfielder for Kolmonen club Kajaanin Haka. He also captained the Pakistan national team.

A versatile midfielder, Hussain has been praised for his defensive abilities, ball retention, and tackling.

== Club career ==
=== Early years ===
Hussain started his career with his hometown club Malir Shaheen FC. He was then signed for the Pakistan International Airlines departmental side. Hussain played an important role, taking PIA to third place in the 2010 season.

=== Khan Research Laboratories ===
He played for Khan Research Laboratories between 2012 and 2014, winning the Pakistan Premier League title in 2012–13, 2013–14 and Challenge Cup and 2012.

He also participated in the AFC President's Cup from 2012 to 2014. He was a member of the team which reached the 2013 AFC President's Cup final, after falling to Turkmen club Balkan FT by 0–1 in the final.

=== Dordoi Bishkek ===
In August 2014, Hussain signed a two-year contract with Dordoi Bishkek in the Kyrgyz Premier League. The debut of Hussain for Dordoi was held on 28 August in a friendly match against Ala Too. Saddam helped the team win a landslide victory 3–0. After the first season at the club, he won the following honours: which included the league title, league cup and super cup.

=== Isa Town ===
He joined Isa Town FC in Bahrain second division in 2015, making 20 appearances throughout the season.

=== K-Electric ===
In February 2016, Hussain returned to Pakistan joining K-Electric for the 2016 AFC Cup.

=== Gençler Birliği ===
At January 2017, he moved to Gençler Birliği S.K. in the Northern Cyprus top-tier KTFF Süper Lig on a year-long deal.

=== Sui Southern Gas ===
In 2018, he signed for SSGC F.C. where he went on to play for them and captained the team. The club was closed after the shutdown of departmental sports in Pakistan in 2021. After the restoration of departmental sports in Pakistan, SSGC terminated contracts of the players of the squad on 26 August 2022, including Saddam.

=== Salalah ===
On 16 September 2023, Hussain signed for Salalah SC which competes in the Oman First Division League which is the second tier in Omani football league pyramid on a one-year deal.

=== Kajaanin Haka ===
On 26 August 2025, Hussain signed a two-year contract for Finnish Kolmonen club Kajaanin Haka.

== International career ==
=== 2009–2015: Early years ===
Hussain first represented the Pakistan under-19 team as captain for the 2010 AFC U-19 Championship qualification in Tehran in 2009, under coach Gohar Zaman. He subsequently represented the Pakistan under-23 team in the 2010 Asian Games and in a test series against Palestine.

He made his senior debut at the 2011 SAFF Championship against Bangladesh. In March 2013, he was included in the squad for the 2014 AFC Challenge Cup qualification. He was subsequently called for the 2013 SAFF Championship, and the 2013 Philippine Peace Cup. He scored his first goal with the under-23 side in August 2014 in a friendly against India, which ended in a 2–0 victory. He was declared player of the match of the second friendly against India where he scored the goal, and player of the series in a two match friendly series in 2014 at Bangalore, India. He subsequently represented Pakistan in the 2014 Asian Games.

In 2015, he was a starter in the 2018 FIFA World Cup qualification against Yemen. In May 2015, Khan also participated in the 2016 AFC U-23 Championship qualification, where he scored in a 3–1 victory over Kyrgyzstan.

=== 2015–2019: Suspensions and captainship ===
Hussain missed international exposure for the next 3 years, as Pakistan was suspended from all football activities by FIFA on 10 October 2017. For three years since March 2015, Pakistan remained suspended from any international competition because of the crisis created inside the Pakistan Football Federation. Hussain along with other national team players meanwhile participated with Pakistan during local Leisure Leagues exhibitions matches involving Brazilian star Ronaldinho and Ryan Giggs in 2017.

In 2018, Hussain participated in Pakistan tour to Bahrain for test matches as a preparation for the upcoming tournaments, when his national side returned to international circuit after 3 years. He captained the under-23 side in the 2018 Asian Games in Indonesia in which he scored the second goal in a 2–1 victory against Nepal to pull off their first win in the Asian Games. In the 2018 SAFF Championship Hussain captained the Pakistan senior team, helping the side finishing the campaign sealing its place in the semi-finals. He terminated the year playing two friendly matches against Palestine. Saddam also featured with Kaká, Luís Figo, Carles Puyol and Nicolas Anelka during their visit to Pakistan in 2019.

=== 2020–present ===
In January 2020, Hussain was named in Pakistan's squad for a two-match friendly tour in Malaysia against UKM and Felda United on 22 and 23 January respectively, which ended in a 2–2 draw and a 2–0 victory. This was before Pakistan were once again suspended from all football activities by FIFA on 7 April 2021. After the suspension was lifted on 29 June 2022, Hussain along with his teammate Saadullah Khan were excluded from the national football team camp, as they were unable to attend the trials of the national team where they were named, following the return to international football due to their ongoing court case against their former departmental club SSGC.

In September 2025, Hussain recalled to the national football team for their 2027 AFC Asian Cup qualification matches against Afghanistan on 9 & 14 October 2025, however failed to make into the final squad.

== Career statistics ==
=== International ===
As of 24 March 2019

Appearances and goals by national team and year
| National team | Year | Apps | Goals |
|---|---|---|---|
| Pakistan | 2011 | 3 | 0 |
| Pakistan | 2012 | 0 | 0 |
| Pakistan | 2013 | 8 | 0 |
| Pakistan | 2014 | 3 | 0 |
| Pakistan | 2015 | 3 | 0 |
| Pakistan | 2018 | 6 | 0 |
| Total | | 23 | 0 |

== Honours ==
=== Club ===
Pakistan International Airlines

- Pakistan Premier League: Third Place: 2010
- Challenge Cup: Runner Up: 2009

Khan Research Laboratories

- Pakistan Premier League: 2012, 2013
- Challenge Cup: 2012
- AFC President's Cup: Runner Up: 2013

Dordoi Bishkek

- Shoro Top League: 2014
- Kyrgyzstan Cup: 2014
- Kyrgyzstan Super Cup: 2014
- Ala-Too Cup: 2015

=== Country ===
Pakistan

- Philippine Peace Cup: Third Place: 2013

== See also ==
- List of Pakistan national football team captains
