= Muhammad Adil =

Pakistani footballer (born 1992)

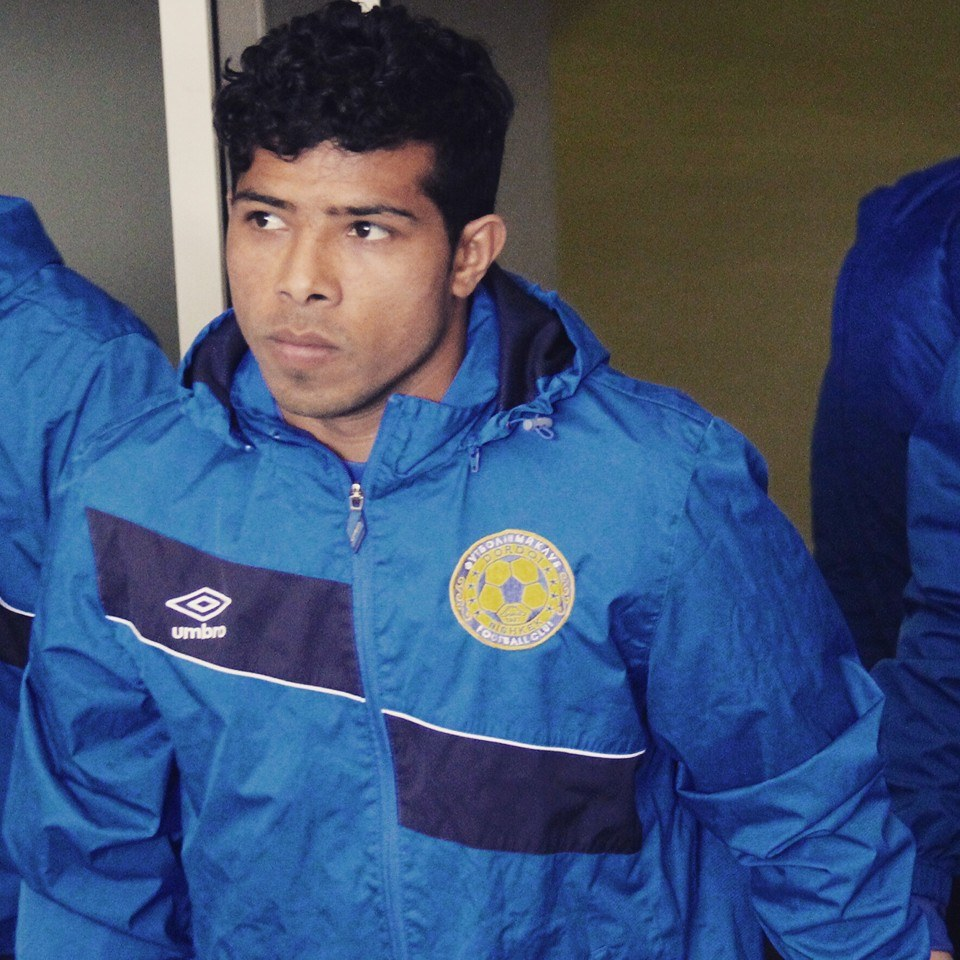
- Adil with Dordoi Bishkek in 2015

Personal information
- Full name: Muhammad Adil Iqbal
- Date of birth: 9 July 1992 (age 34)
- Place of birth: Bahawalpur, Pakistan
- Height: 1.63 m (5 ft 4 in)
- Position: Left winger

Team information
- Current team: WAPDA

Youth career
- 2004–2009: Young Blood FC Bahawalpur

Senior career*
Years	Team	Apps	(Gls)
2009–2011	Pak Elektron	25	(6)
2011–2014	Khan Research Laboratories	65	(24)
2014–2016	Dordoi Bishkek	21	(5)
2016–2017	Khan Research Laboratories		
2017–2018	Hawkesbury City		
2018–2020	Khan Research Laboratories		
2020–	WAPDA		
2021	→ Defenders (loan)	1	(0)

International career^{‡}
2010–2014	Pakistan U23	5	(1)
2011–2018	Pakistan	24	(0)
Medal record
Khan Research Laboratories
Runner-up	Pakistan Premier League	2010
Winner	Challenge Cup	2010
Winner	Pakistan Premier League	2011
Winner	Challenge Cup	2011
Winner	Pakistan Premier League	2012
Winner	Challenge Cup	2012
Runner-up	AFC President's Cup	2013
Winner	Pakistan Premier League	2013
Dordoi Bishkek
Winner	Kyrgyzstan League	2014
Winner	Kyrgyzstan Cup	2014
Winner	Kyrgyzstan Super Cup	2014
Winner	Ala-Too Cup	2015
Pakistan
Second place	M.R. Cup Sri Lanka	2012
Third place	Philippine Peace Cup	2013
- * Club domestic league appearances and goals as of 00:26, 24 July 2022 (UTC) ‡ National team caps and goals as of 21:47, 24 March 2022 (UTC)

Muhammad Adil Iqbal (Urdu: محمد عادل اقبال; born 9 July 1992) is a Pakistani professional footballer who plays as a left winger. He is associated with the WAPDA football team.

Adil first came to prominence with Pak Elektron – signing a professional contract with the club at the age of 18 – scoring six goals in 25 appearances in his first season. The following season he signed for departmental side Khan Research Laboratories, where he went on to win three Pakistan Premier League titles, two Challenge Cup titles and finishing runners-up in the 2013 AFC President's Cup. Three years later, Adil's signature was pursued by a leading Kyrgyzstani club, and after protracted transfer negotiations he joined Dordoi Bishkek in 2014. Adil played a major role in helping the team win a treble; the league title, league cup and super cup, scoring four goals and making six assists in the league. After being linked to a club of Eerste Divisie in Netherlands, Derby County, and Pembroke Athleta, after refusing to further extend his contract with Dordoi Bishkek, Adil returned to Khan Research Laboratories, winning the 2016 Pakistan Football Federation Cup. In 2017, Adil signed for Australian club Hawkesbury City in a short-term deal, until returning to his former club. In 2021, Adil had a brief stint at Defenders FC in the Sri Lanka Super League. He later joined WAPDA.

Adil received his first senior international cap at the 2012 AFC Challenge Cup qualifications against Turkmenistan on 21 March 2011. With the under-23 team, Adil also represented Pakistan in the Asian Games and South Asian Games. He earned 26 caps for the national team after his 2011 debut, playing in the 2012 and 2014 AFC Challenge Cup qualification tournaments, 2013 SAFF Championship, the 2018 FIFA World Cup qualifiers and the 2018 SAFF Championship.

== Club career ==
=== Early career ===
Adil started his youth career with Young Blood FC Bahawalpur. The club took him to Lahore for under-14 trials when he was young, and supported him from 2004 onwards. Adil used to work for several hours as a labourer before going to the field to play for the club.

=== Pak Elektron ===
In 2009, Adil signed his first professional contract at the age of 18 with Pakistan Premier League departmental side Pak Elektron. Adil went on to score six goals in 25 appearances, making a lot of assists, in all competitions.

=== Khan Research Laboratories ===
His performances and record made Khan Research Laboratories, the runners-up of the league, caught their attention to sign him permanently. The following season, Adil won the Pakistan Premier League with Khan Research Laboratories in 2011 as KRL set a Pakistan Premier League record scoring the most points in a season in the Pakistan Premier League with 77 points. Adil also won the Challenge Cup with KRL (1–0) against rivals K-Electric in 2011. Later, Adil went on to make his debut AFC President's Cup on 8 May 2012 in a 0–0 draw against Erchim from Mongolia.

==== 2012–2013 season ====
During the 2012 season, Adil played an important in the first-team under then manager Tariq Lutfi, who replaced Sajjad Mahmood the previous season; Adil established himself as a key player and guided the team to clinch a historic double; winning the league title, the domestic cup and qualified for the AFC President's Cup for the following season – finishing runners-up in the competition losing (1–0) to Turkmenistan's Balkan. Adil scored his first goal in the continental competition in the 77th minute in a 2–0 group stage victory over Philippine's Global and later scoring the second goal in a 2–0 win over Hilal Al-Quds from Palestine in the final group stage. He helped KRL to reach the final, which they eventually lost. In 2013 season, Adil won his third and last league title with the Rawalpindi side.

During his three years stint at Khan Research Laboratories, Adil scored a total of 24 goals in 65 matches in all competitions before signing for Kyrgyzstani club FC Dordoi Bishkek, managed by former Pakistan national team coach Zaviša Milosavljević, in 2014.

=== Dordoi Bishkek ===
Adil completed his move to FC Dordoi Bishkek in 2014, joining his former club and Pakistan national team player Kaleemullah Khan, after successful performances in 2013 AFC President's Cup, on an initial one-year contract. Since his arrival in Dordoi, he has helped the club win their pre-season tour friendly matches in Turkey and Russia. He played a major role in helping the team win a treble; the league title, league cup and super cup, scoring four goals and six assists in 13 appearances in the league.

Adil made his AFC Cup debut on 9 February 2015 in a 1–0 defeat against Turkmenistan side Ahal in the preliminary round. In an interview with Dawn News, it was reported that Adil has got an offer from football club of Eerste Divisie in Netherlands and that "he will travel to Netherlands in May 2015 to attend the trial to show them his skills". He was later offered a two-year contract by Championship side Derby County after he impressed the manager Paul Clement with his performances for Dordoi Bishkek, but by then he had already signed a contract extension with the Kyrgyz side, effectively ending his chances of playing in the English second-tier till January at least. In 2016, he was reported to have undergone a three-week trial for the Maltese Premier League side Pembroke Athleta, after refusing to further extend his contract with Dordoi Bishkek.

=== Return to Khan Research Laboratories ===
After successfully completing the trial for Pembroke Athleta, the move to the club was put on hold due to visa hurdles. In the meantime, Adil reported to train with former side KRL. After the move failed to materialise, he stayed with KRL, winning the 2016 Pakistan Football Federation Cup.

=== Hawkesbury City ===
In wake of the crisis of the Pakistan Football Federation in 2017, Adil signed for Australian club Hawkesbury City in the NSW League Two in a short-term deal, which would allow him play ten matches till the end of next month. He returned to KRL by the end of the deal, winning the 2018–19 Pakistan Premier League.

=== WAPDA ===
Adil joined WAPDA in January 2020.

==== Loan to Defenders FC ====
In 2021, Adil joined Defenders FC in the Sri Lanka Super League on loan from WAPDA.

In 2022, Adil trained with WAPDA to maintain his fitness, hinting for a future move to a league in Nepal.

He also started supporting the local youth in Bahawalpur and Multan, and trained the children at his youth club Young Blood FC Bahawalpur. He also conducted trials for the Global Soccer Ventures (GSV) talent hunt with the Irish Premier League Club St Patrick’s Athletic FC coaches along with former national teammate Faisal Iqbal. Adil also hinted his focus to invest in programs that can help the upcoming footballers in the future, as his days as a fruit merchant prepared him for the business side of the sport.

== International career ==
Adil started his international youth career in 2006 being part of the under-14 Pakistan team in the AFC U-14 Football Festival held in Bangladesh. Apart from the under-14 team, Adil also represented the under-17, under-19, under-21, and the Pakistan under-23 national sides. Whilst with the under-23 team, Adil also represented Pakistan in a test series against Palestine in 2011, Asian Games and South Asian Games, scoring his first goal in the 54th minute in a 2-2 draw against Palestine in Al-Nakba International Football Cup 2012.

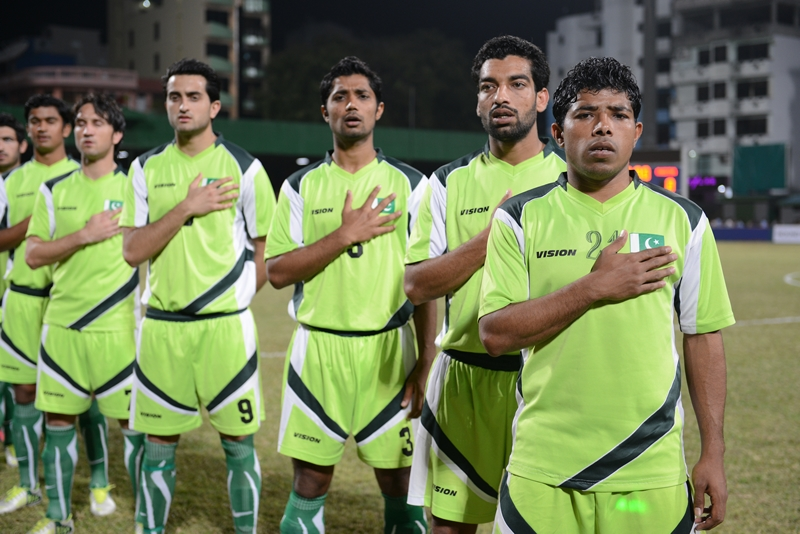
Adil at the front right with Pakistan national team in Malé during a friendly against Maldives in 2013.

Adil earned his first senior cap for Pakistan at the 2012 AFC Challenge Cup qualifications against Turkmenistan on 21 March 2011. He has earned 26 caps for the national team since his debut in 2011, playing in the 2012 and 2014 AFC Challenge Cup qualification tournaments, 2013 SAFF Championship, the 2018 FIFA World Cup qualifiers and the 2018 SAFF Championship.

== Personal life ==
Adil was born in Bahawalpur, Punjab and was a fruit and sugarcane seller, going around the streets of Bahwalpur with his cart, to financially support his family. However, he used to play football whenever he found the time and thus was scouted when he got selected for the regional team in the National U-14 Championship held in 2006. He eventually impressed the coaches to secure a call-up for the Pakistan U-14 side that took part in AFC Festival of Football in Bangladesh.

In an interview with Football Pakistan, Adil said that he enjoys eating the national dish of Kyrgyzstan, Pilaf, which is a particular favourite of his, and he also enjoys grabbing a slice of pizza or two when possible.

== Style of play ==
A right-footed player, Adil usually plays as a left winger. Earlier in his career he primarily played as a wide midfielder. Adil is known for his dribbling skills, speed, crossing ability and his accurate right foot long-range shots. Adil has described the Argentina national team player Carlos Tevez as his ideal football star and has been compared with Brazilian footballer Roberto Carlos for his quick pace and composure by the local media in Pakistan.

== Career statistics ==
=== Club ===
As of 22 March 2015

Appearances and goals by club, season and competition
Club performance			League		Cup		Continental		Other		Total		Ref.
Club	League	Season	Apps	Goals	Apps	Goals	Apps	Goals	Apps	Goals	Apps	Goals	Ref.
Kyrgyzstan			League		Kyrgyzstan Cup		Asia^{1}		Other^{2}		Total		Ref.
Dordoi Bishkek	Shoro Top League	2014	13	4	3	0	0	0	5	0	21	4	-
Dordoi Bishkek	Shoro Top League	2015	8	0	1	0	1	0	5	0	1	0	-
Total			21	4	4	0	1	0	10	0	32	4	—
Career total			21	4	4	0	1	0	10	0	33	4	—

- 1.Includes statistics from AFC Cup and AFC President's Cup.
- 2.Includes statistics from Challenge Cup, Kyrgyzstan Super Cup, Ala-Too Cup, and Legend Cup.

=== International ===
As of 24 March 2019

Appearances and goals by national team and year
National team	Year	Apps	Goals
Pakistan	2011	4	0
Pakistan	2012	1	0
Pakistan	2013	13	0
Pakistan	2014	0	0
Pakistan	2015	2	0
Pakistan	2018	4	0
Total		24	0

=== International goals ===
Scores and results table list Pakistan's goal tally first.

#	Date	Venue	Opponent	Score	Result	Competition
–	18 May 2012	Dora International Stadium, Hebron, Palestine	Palestine	1–1	2–2	U23 Friendly (2012 Al Nakba Cup)

== Honours ==
Khan Research Laboratories

- Pakistan Premier League: 2011, 2012, 2013, 2018–19; Runner-up: 2010
- Challenge Cup: 2010, 2011, 2012, 2016
- AFC President's Cup: Runner Up: 2013

Dordoi Bishkek

- Shoro Top League: 2014
- Kyrgyzstan Cup: 2014
- Kyrgyzstan Super Cup: 2014
- Ala-Too Cup: 2015

Pakistan

- M.R Cup Sri Lanka: Runners-up: 2012
- Philippine Peace Cup: Third Place: 2013
