= Shakir Lashari =

Pakistani footballer (born 1984)

Personal information
- Full name: Shakir Lashari
- Date of birth: 24 March 1984 (age 42)
- Place of birth: Karachi, Pakistan
- Height: 1.77 m (5 ft 10 in)
- Position: Winger

Youth career
- 2002: Lyari Labour Welfare Centre

Senior career*
Years	Team	Apps	(Gls)
2002–2003	Lyari Labour Welfare Centre	9	(6)
2003	Lyari Blues	0	(0)
2005–2007	Karachi Electric Supply Corporation	25	(5)
2007–2019	Pakistan Airlines	206	(75)
2019–2021	Masha United		

International career
2006	Pakistan U23		
2011	Pakistan	1	(0)
Medal record
Representing Pakistan
Winner	South Asian Games	2006
- * Club domestic league appearances and goals

Shakir Lashari (Urdu: شاکر لاشاری; born 24 March 1984) is a Pakistani former footballer who played as a striker.

== Club career ==
=== Non-league ===
Born in Karachi, Sindh, Lashari started his career with Lyari Labour Welfare Centre, with whom he competed in the 2003 Karachi Football League. Lashari played a vital role as his team finished third in the league, with Lashari scoring six goals in nine appearances, including a brace in a 4–0 victory against Bhutta Muhammaden. After the end of the season, Lashari joined Lyari Blues, with them he played Lyari Festival Football Tournament, playing all three games and scoring his only goal in the finals in the 32nd minute to secure a 1–0 win over Lyari Greys.

=== Karachi Electric Supply Corporation ===
==== 2005–06 ====
In 2005–06 season, Lashari joined Karachi Electric Supply Corporation playing in Football Federation League. Lashari scored on his league debut in a 3–0 victory over Baloch Nushki on 17 January 2005 and went on to score three goals in five matches, as they earned promotion to 2006–07 Pakistan Premier League, top-flight of Pakistani football. Lashari competed in 2005 National Football Challenge Cup with Karachi Electric Supply Corporation, his first ever game for team was a 3–1 win over Korangi Rangers, Lashari scored hat-trick on his debut for the team scoring goals in 33rd, 78th and 79th minutes. In the next game against Naka Muhammaden, Lashari scored a brace scoring in 21st and 49th minutes as his team routed Naka Muhammaden 6–0. Lashari scored six goals in six games, scoring in a semi-finals draw 1–1 draw against Pakistan Navy and in a 1–0 third-place victory over Pakistan Public Work Department.

==== 2006–07 ====
In 2006–07 Pakistan Premier League, Lashari scored just 2 goals in 20 appearances for the club as they finished sixth in the league.

=== Pakistan Airlines ===
==== 2007–08 ====
Lashari joined Pakistan Airlines before the start of 2007–08 season, after a not good start in previous season, Lashari improved in this season, scoring 10 goals in 26 appearances, including a brace in a 2–0 win over Wohaib, scoring in 55th and 80th minutes.

==== 2008–09 ====
In 2008–09 season, Lashari scored his first-ever top-flight league hat-trick as Pakistan Airlines trashed Pakistan Television 4–0, with Lashari completing his hat-trick in 54 minutes, scoring in 21st, 36th and 75th minutes. Lashari ended season with 16 goals in 26 matches, his highest ever. Lashari ended runners-up in 2009 National Football Challenge Cup, when Pakistan Airlines lost 1–0 to Khan Research Laboratories.

==== 2009–16 ====
In 2009–10 season Lashari scored his first of the season in a 3–2 loss to WAPDA, scoring in 31st minute as they went on to lose the game courtesy of Arif Mehmood hat-trick for WAPDA. Lashari scored a brace in a 5–0 thumping of Habib Bank when he scored opening and the last goal in 7th and 71st minutes respectively. Lashari found the net again twice in a 2–0 victory over his former club Karachi Electric Supply Corporation, scoring in the last ten minutes of the game. Lashari scored the equaliser for the Airlines against Karachi Port Trust, who went on to win after Zahid Ahmed scored the winner for the Portmen in the 68th minute. On 18 October 2009, Lashari scored third hat-trick of his career as Pakistan Airlines thumped Baloch Nushki 4–0, Lashari scored in 31st, 43rd and 88th minutes. Lashari's last goal came against Pak Elektron when he scored the second goal for team in 31st minutes as Pakistan Airlines won the match 3–0. Lashari scored a total of 10 goals in 26 matches. He also featured with Karachi Energy franchise team at the Geo Super Football league, where he helped the side win the title.

After several years of inactivity due to ban on Pakistan Football Federation, he continued to play for the team until the 2018–19 season.

== International career ==
Lashari was called by the Pakistan under 23 national team for the 2006 South Asian Games held in Colombo, where he helped Pakistan win the gold medal.

He made his senior international cap in the 2011 SAFF Championship against Maldives.

== Career statistics ==
=== Club ===
As of match played 16 December 2018

Appearances and goals by club, season and competition
Club	Season	Division	League		Challenge Cup		Other		Total	
Club	Season	Division	Apps	Goals	Apps	Goals	Apps	Goals	Apps	Goals
Lyari Labour Welfare Centre	2002–03	Karachi Football League	9	6	–		–		9	6
Lyari Blues	2003	Lyari Football Festival	–		–		3	1	3	1
Lyari Blues	Total		9	6	—		3	1	12	7
Karachi Electric Supply Corporation	2005–06	Football Federation League	5	3	7	7	–		12	10
Karachi Electric Supply Corporation	2006–07	Pakistan Premier League	20	2	–		3 (Note: Appearance in Lyari Football Festival)	1	23	3
Karachi Electric Supply Corporation	Total		25	5	7	7	3	1	35	13
Pakistan Airlines	2007–08	Pakistan Premier League	26	10	–		–		26	10
Pakistan Airlines	2008–09	Pakistan Premier League	26	16	6	6	–		32	22
Pakistan Airlines	2009–10	Pakistan Premier League	26	10	3	1	–		29	11
Pakistan Airlines	2010–11	Pakistan Premier League	30	10	6	5	–		36	15
Pakistan Airlines	2011–12	Pakistan Premier League	30	9	5	2	–		35	11
Pakistan Airlines	2012–13	Pakistan Premier League	16	9	3	2	–		19	11
Pakistan Airlines	2013–14	Pakistan Premier League	30	5	4	1	–		34	16
Pakistan Airlines	2014–15	Pakistan Premier League	22	6	6	7	–		28	13
Pakistan Airlines	Total		206	75	33	24	—		241	99
Career total			240	86	40	31	3	1	283	118

=== International ===
Appearances and goals by year and competition
National team	Year	Apps	Goals
Pakistan	2011	1	0
Total		1	0

== Honours ==
=== Pakistan U23 ===
- South Asian Games: 2006
