= Muhammad Qasim (footballer) =

Pakistani footballer

Personal information
- Full name: Muhammad Qasim
- Date of birth: May 1, 1984 (age 42)
- Place of birth: Islamabad, Pakistan
- Positions: Right winger; forward

Youth career
- Ravi FC

Senior career*
Years	Team	Apps	(Gls)
2005–2016	Khan Research Laboratories		
2007	Islamabad United	6	(3)

International career
2006–2011	Pakistan U-23		
2007–2011	Pakistan	15	(4)
Medal record
Representing Pakistan
Winner	South Asian Games	2006
- * Club domestic league appearances and goals

Muhammad Qasim (born 1 May 1984) is a Pakistani former footballer who played as a right-winger.

Qasim has won the league title with Khan Research Laboratories for four times, winning his first league title in 2009-10, winning further three back to back league titles in 2010-11, 2011-12 and 2012-13. Qasim has also won National Football Challenge Cup with KRL on six occasions including four back to back cup wins from 2009, 2010, 2011 and 2012. He won the national cups in 2015 and 2016. Qasim also won Super Football League with Islamabad United in its inaugural season. At international level, he won the 2006 South Asian Games with the Pakistan under 23 football team.

== Club career ==
=== Ravi ===
Qasim started his footballing career with Islamabad club Ravi FC.

=== Khan Research Laboratories ===
==== 2005–10: Debut year, injuries & first league title ====
Qasim made his professional debut in 2005–06 Pakistan Premier League with Khan Research Laboratories. He ended the 2007-08 season on third position with KRL and scored 9 goals in 18 appearances.

In 2007, Qasim won the inaugural season of Super Football League with Islamabad United, scoring 3 goals in 6 appearances.

Qasim missed the 2008-09 season due to a knee-injury. Qasim along with Khan Research Laboratories won their first ever league in 2009-10, after drawing 0-0 with Army on the final day of the league. Both teams ended on 60 points each, with Khan Research Laboratories winning the league on goal differences.

==== 2010–2011: Vice captaincy ====
Qasim was made club's vice-captain in the 2010-11 season. Qasim started his and KRL's season with a 2-0 victory against PAF, Qasim scored the opening goal in 37th minute. On 3 October 2010, Qasim scored his second goal of the season in the 6th minute, as KRL defeated Navy 2-0 in the game. Qasim netted his first hat-trick of the season in a 4-0 thumping of PEL scoring goals in 23rd, 33rd and 52nd minutes of the game, it marked as his ninth hat-trick of the career. On 3 December 2010, Qasim scored the only goal of the game against Afghan in the ninth minute. KRL defeated SSGC 3-0 with Qasim scoring second goal for the club in 54th after the left-winger Mehmood Khan broke the offside trap to assist the goal for him. On 12 December 2010, KRL defeated NBP 2-0 as Qasim scored goals in each half, scoring in 18th and 81st minutes respectively. Qasim ended the season as the top-scorer of KRL, scoring 11 goals in 30 games as KRL finished second in the table.

== International career ==
Qasim was first called by the Pakistan under 23 national team for the 2006 South Asian Games held in Colombo, where he helped Pakistan win the gold medal.

He earned his first senior international cap by head coach Akhtar Mohiuddin against Iraq in the 2010 World Cup qualifiers, a game which Pakistan famously drew 0-0 in Damascus, Syria with Qasim's strong running and work-rate giving a strong impression for the coaching staff and fans alike.

His first goal came in a friendly against Nepal at Pokhara on March 27, 2008 which Pakistan won 2-0 after a long run from his own half before a powerful shot that beat the Nepalese keeper. Qasim later scored an international hat-trick in the 9-2 record win against Guam in the 2008 AFC Challenge Cup qualifiers.

== Career statistics ==
=== International ===
Appearances and goals by national team and year
National team	Year	Apps	Goals
Pakistan	2007	1	0
Pakistan	2008	8	4
Pakistan	2009	1	0
Pakistan	2011	5	0
Total		15	4

Scores and results list Pakistan's goal tally first, score column indicates score after each Qasim goal.

List of international goals scored by Muhammad Qasim
No.	Date	Venue	Opponent	Score	Result	Competition
1	27 March 2008	Pokhara, Nepal	Nepal	2–0	2–0	Friendly
2	6 April 2008	Zhongshan Soccer Stadium, Taipei, Taiwan	Guam	4–0	9–2	2008 AFC Challenge Cup qualification
3	6 April 2008	Zhongshan Soccer Stadium, Taipei, Taiwan	Guam	7–0	9–2	2008 AFC Challenge Cup qualification
4	6 April 2008	Zhongshan Soccer Stadium, Taipei, Taiwan	Guam	8–2	9–2	2008 AFC Challenge Cup qualification

== Honours ==
Islamabad United
- Super Football League: 2007

Khan Research Laboratories
- Pakistan Premier League: 2009–10, 2011–12, 2012–13, 2013–14
- National Challenge Cup: 2009, 2010, 2011, 2012, 2015, 2016

=== Pakistan U-23 ===
- South Asian Games: 2006

== See also ==
- List of Pakistan national football team hat-tricks
