= Muhammad Rasool =

Pakistani footballer

Personal information
- Full name: Muhammad Rasool
- Date of birth: 23 May 1985 (age 41)
- Place of birth: Charun, Chitral District, Pakistan
- Height: 1.72 m (5 ft 8 in)
- Position: Forward

Senior career*
Years	Team	Apps	(Gls)
2006–2009	Khan Research Laboratories	68	(32)
2009–2019	K-Electric	171	(116)
2010	Karachi Energy	10	(6)

International career
2006	Pakistan U23		
2006–2011	Pakistan	14	(1)
Medal record
Representing Pakistan
Winner	South Asian Games	2006
- * Club domestic league appearances and goals

Muhammad Rasool (born 23 May 1985) is a Pakistani former footballer who played as a forward for the Pakistan national football team.

Rasool won the Pakistan Premier League (PPL) with K-Electric in the 2014–15 season. Rasool twice finished the season as PPL's top scorer, first with Khan Research Laboratories in 2008–09 and with K-Electric in 2014–15, scoring 22 goals in 26 games and 22 goals in 22 games, respectively. At the international level, he won the 2006 South Asian Games with the Pakistan under-23 national team.

== Club career ==
=== Early career ===
Rasool started playing football at an early age and later played for the college football team. He captained the college team and helped them win Khyber Pakhtunkhwa (formerly NWFP) inter-college and inter-board tournaments. Later, he played for the All Pakistan Universities team and participated in the National Championship in 2004.

=== Khan Research Laboratories ===
2006–07

Rasool joined Khan Research Laboratories in the 2006–07 season. Rasool scored his first league goal on 14 December 2006 against Wohaib, scoring the opening goal in the 34th minute in a 3–0 victory. On 19 January 2007, Rasool scored the winner for Khan Research Laboratories against National Bank, scoring in the 66th minute as Khan Research Laboratories won the game 2–1. Rasool ended the season with 2 goals in 16 appearances.

2007–08

Rasool scored his team's fourth goal in the opening match of the 2007–08 season in a 4–0 win over Wohaib. On 3 November 2007, Rasool scored the match's only goal in the 18th minute as Khan Research Laboratories defeated PMC Athletico 1–0. Rasool scored against Pakistan Television on 11 November 2007, scoring the opening goal in the 2nd minute of the game. On 26 December 2007, Rasool scored his first hat-trick against National Bank, scoring in the 4th, 42nd, and 49th minutes. In the first game of 2008 on 1 January 2008, Rasool scored a brace in a 2–0 win over Karachi Port Trust, and scored in the 31st and 80th minutes, ending the season with 8 goals in 26 appearances.

2008–09

The 2008–09 season was the breakthrough season for Rasool, as he won the golden boot after scoring 22 goals in 26 appearances for the club. Rasool started his campaign with a hat-trick against Karachi Electric Supply Corporation, scoring in the 37th, 42nd, and 56th minutes, as Khan Research Laboratories won the game by 5–1. On 17 August 2008, Rasool scored a brace against Pakistan Airlines in a 2–0 win, finding the net in the 11th and 61st minutes. Rasool scored another brace against WAPDA on 27 August 2008. After scoring 7 goals in 8 matches in August, Rasool was unable to find the net until 14 October, as he scored the third goal for Khan Research Laboratories in the 77th minute in a 3–0 win over Pakistan Television. On 23 October, Rasool scored his second hat-trick of the season against Pakistan Television, completing his hat-trick in 25 minutes, scoring his first goal in the 60th minute, second in the 70th minute, and third in the 85th minute. Rasool scored a brace against Pakistan Army in a 2–0 victory. On 29 October, Rasool scored the match's only goal in the 60th minute as Khan Research Laboratories defeated Pakistan Navy 1–0. Rasool ended the season as the league's top-scorer, although Khan Research Laboratories finished third. Rasool scored 3 goals in 6 matches in the 2009 National Challenge Cup, winning his first silverware after Khan Research Laboratories defeated Pakistan Airlines 1–0 in the finals.

=== K-Electric ===
Rasool moved to KESC in 2009. In the 2011 National Football Challenge Cup, he finished as top-scorer as KESC finished runner-up after Rasool's former club, KRL. He again finished as top scorer in the 2012 KPT Challenge Cup, and KESC finished as runner-up again, falling against KRL in the final on penalties. In the 2012–13 Pakistan Premier League, his goals helped KESC achieve second place in the season, and he finished as the second top-scorer after Kaleemullah. He was seriously injured in a match against Habib Bank when, during a clash with the opponent goalkeeper, Rasool suffered serious injuries to his face and legs and remained unconscious for 25 minutes.

In the 2014–15 Pakistan Premier League, K-Electric finally clinched their league title after four years, with Rasool finishing as the league's top-scorer with 22 goals. His performances in the season led Rasool to get offers from clubs in Ghana and Zimbabwe. In the 2016 AFC Cup, Rasool scored in the Qualifying Playoff round in a 3–3 draw against Druk United. He also participated and scored in the 2015 Sheikh Kamal International Club Cup in Bangladesh.

Rasool missed international exposure for the next 3 years, as FIFA suspended Pakistan from all football activities on 10 October 2017. Since March 2015, Pakistan has remained suspended from international competition for three years because of the crisis created inside the Pakistan Football Federation. Meanwhile, Rasool and other national team players participated with Pakistan during local Leisure Leagues exhibition matches involving Brazilian star Ronaldinho and Ryan Giggs in 2017.

He lastly participated in the 2018–19 Pakistan Premier League before K-Electric eventually dissolved their football team in 2020.

=== Later career ===
At the end of 2019, Rasool participated in the Khyber Pakhtunkhwa Football Cup organised by Ufone, along with his younger cousin Alamgir Ghazi, with the district football team DFA Chitral, falling in the final on penalties against Peshawar Combined FC. In December 2021, Rasool captained DFA Chitral, winning the 2021 Khyber Pakhtunkhwa Football Cup after winning the final against Muslim FC.

== International career ==
Rasool was called by the Pakistan under-23 national team for the 2006 South Asian Games held in Colombo, where he helped Pakistan win the gold medal.

He got his first senior cap against Jordan in the 2007 AFC Asian Cup qualifications in a 3–0 loss. Rasool was part of the national team that defeated Guam 9–2 in the 2008 AFC Challenge Cup qualification. Rasool's last appearance was against Bangladesh in the 2014 FIFA World Cup qualifications.

== Personal life ==
Rasool's younger cousin, Alamgir Ghazi, is a footballer and has represented the Pakistan national team.

In October 2023, Rasool donated 16.5 kanals of land to build a sports complex in his hometown, Charun, Upper Chitral.

== Career statistics ==
=== Club ===
Appearances and goals by club, season and competition
Club	Season	League			National Cup (Note: Appearances in National Football Challenge Cup)		Asia (Note: Appearances in AFC Cup)		Total	
Club	Season	Division	Apps	Goals	Apps	Goals	Apps	Goals	Apps	Goals
Khan Research Laboratories	2006–07	Pakistan Premier League	18	1	—		—		8	1
Khan Research Laboratories	2007–08	Pakistan Premier League	24	9	5	2	—		21	10
Khan Research Laboratories	2008–09	Pakistan Premier League	26	22	6	3	—		32	25
Khan Research Laboratories	Total		68	32	11	5	—		79	37
K-Electric	2009–10	Pakistan Premier League	10	5	4	1	—		14	6
K-Electric	Total		10	5	4	1	—		14	6
Karachi Energy	2010	Super Football League	10	6	—		—		10	6
Karachi Energy	Total		10	6	—		—		10	6
K-Electric	2010–11	Pakistan Premier League	25	9	6	5	—		31	14
K-Electric	2011–12	Pakistan Premier League	30	19	6	10	—		36	29
K-Electric	2012–13	Pakistan Premier League	30	25	6	3	—		36	28
K-Electric	2013–14	Pakistan Premier League	30	24	6	2	—		36	26
K-Electric	2014–15	Pakistan Premier League	22	22	4	3	2 (Note: Two appearances and two goals in 2016 AFC Cup qualifying round)	2	28	27
K-Electric	2018–19	Pakistan Premier League	24	12	2	0	—		26	12
K-Electric	Total		161	111	30	23	2	2	193	136
Career total			249	154	45	29	2	2	296	185

=== International ===
Appearances and goals by national team and year
National team	Year	Apps	Goals
Pakistan	2006	3	0
Pakistan	2008	5	1
Pakistan	2009	4	0
Pakistan	2011	2	0
Total		14	1

Scores and results list Pakistan's goal tally first, score column indicates score after each Rasool goal.

List of international goals scored by Muhammad Rasool
No.	Date	Venue	Opponent	Score	Result	Competition
1	27 March 2008	Pokhara Rangasala, Pokhara, Nepal	Nepal	2–0	2–0	Friendly

== Honours ==
Khan Research Laboratories

- National Football Challenge Cup: 2009

K-Electric

- Pakistan Premier League: 2014–15

Individual

- Pakistan Premier League Golden Boot: 2008–09, 2014–15
- Super Football League Golden Boot: 2010

=== Pakistan U-23 ===
- South Asian Games: 2006
