= 2008 National Challenge Cup =

Tournament details
- Country: Pakistan
- City: Karachi
- Venue(s): CDGK Stadium, People's Football Stadium
- Dates: 1–15 May 2008
- Teams: 16

Final positions
- Champions: Pakistan Navy (1st title)
- Runners-up: Khan Research Laboratories
- Third place: National Bank
- Fourth place: WAPDA

Tournament statistics
- Matches played: 44
- Goals scored: 71 (1.61 per match)
- All statistics correct as of 31 July 2008.

The 2008 National Challenge Cup was the 18th season of National Challenge Cup, the main cup tournament in Pakistani football.

PTCL were the defending champions, winning the 2005 edition, although their team was dissolved in the end of 2005 season. Thus there was no defending champions.

All the matches were played in CDGK Stadium and Peoples Football Stadium in Karachi.

== Group stage ==
=== Group A ===
Pos	Team	Pld	W	D	L	GF	GA	GD	Pts
1	Pakistan Navy	3	3	0	0	7	1	+6	9
2	Khan Research Laboratories	3	2	0	1	4	4	0	6
3	Pakistan Airforce	3	1	0	2	2	3	−1	3
4	Pak Elektron	3	0	0	3	0	5	−5	0

Source: RSSSF

=== Group B ===
Pos	Team	Pld	W	D	L	GF	GA	GD	Pts
1	National Bank	2	2	0	0	5	0	+5	6
2	WAPDA	2	1	0	1	9	3	+6	3
3	Sui Southern Gas	2	0	0	2	0	11	−11	0
-	Pakistan Television	0	-	-	-	-	-	—	0

Source: RSSSF

=== Group C ===
Pos	Team	Pld	W	D	L	GF	GA	GD	Pts
1	Karachi Port Trust	3	2	1	0	6	2	+4	7
2	Habib Bank	3	2	0	1	4	4	0	6
3	Pakistan Airlines	3	1	1	1	6	2	+4	4
4	Sindh Government Press	3	0	0	3	1	9	−8	0

Source: RSSSF

=== Group D ===
Pos	Team	Pld	W	D	L	GF	GA	GD	Pts
1	Karachi Electric Supply Corporation	2	1	1	0	2	1	+1	4
2	Pakistan Public Work Department	2	1	0	1	2	2	0	3
3	Pakistan Steel	2	0	1	1	2	3	−1	1
-	Pakistan Army	0	-	-	-	-	-	—	0

Source: RSSSF

== Knockout round ==
=== Quarterfinals ===
May 10, 2008

Habib Bank	0–1	Pakistan Navy
	Report

May 10, 2008

Karachi Port Trust	1–2	Khan Research Laboratories
	Report

May 11, 2008

National Bank	3–1	Pakistan Public Work Department
	Report

May 11, 2008

WAPDA	2–0	Karachi Electric Supply Corporation
	Report

=== Semifinals ===
May 13, 2008

KRL F.C.	2–0	WAPDA F.C.
	Report

May 13, 2008

Pakistan Navy	3–0	National Bank
	Report

=== Third place match ===
April 27, 2008

WAPDA	0–2	National Bank
	Report

=== Final ===
April 28, 2008

Pakistan Navy	3–1	Khan Research Laboratories
Sajjad Ahmed 13', 64'; Asif Mehmood 80'	Report	Shahid Ahmed 19'
