= Rizwan Asif =

Pakistani football Player

Personal information
- Full name: Muhammad Rizwan Asif
- Date of birth: January 8, 1990 (age 36)
- Place of birth: Narowal, Pakistan
- Height: 1.67 m (5 ft 6 in)
- Position: Right winger

Youth career
- Wohaib

Senior career*
Years	Team	Apps	(Gls)
2007–2008	Wohaib		
2008	Pak Elektron		
2009–2021	Khan Research Laboratories	136	(21)

International career
2010–2011	Pakistan U23		
2011–2013	Pakistan	7	(0)
- * Club domestic league appearances and goals

Muhammad Rizwan Asif (born 8 January 1990) is a Pakistani former footballer who played as a winger for the Pakistan under-23 team and the senior national team.

He was praised for his dribbling, tracking and passing skills. Asif won five league titles and five National Challenge Cup with KRL.

== Club career ==
=== Early career ===
Asif started his career with Wohaib at the 2007–08 Pakistan Premier League, and later played for Pak Elektron.

=== Khan Research Laboratories ===
Asif later joined Khan Research Laboratories in 2009, winning his first ever league title in his debut season. He further won three more back to back league titles with the club. He also won the National Football Challenge Cup trophies five times. He missed the whole 2012–13 Pakistan Premier League season because of a leg injury.

He also participated in the AFC President's Cup from 2012 to 2014. He was a member of the team which reached the 2013 AFC President's Cup final, after falling to Turkmen club Balkan FT by 0–1 in the final. He received an injury ahead of the 2013 President's Cup while playing a practice game, after developing a hair-line fracture in his leg, the same injury which had previously kept him out of action for almost a year.

== International career ==
Rizwan featured in the 2010 Asian Games with the Pakistan under-23 team. He was selected as vice-captain of the under-23 side at the 2012 Summer Olympics Qualifiers against Malaysia in 2011. The same year, he also played in a test series against Palestine with the under-23 team. He impressed in both competitions, creating chances down the right wing.

After subsequently featuring at the 2012 AFC Challenge Cup qualification with the senior team, he was controversially excluded for the 2014 FIFA World Cup qualification in 2011.

== Career statistics ==
=== Club ===
Appearances and goals by club, season and competition
Club	Season	League			National Football Challenge Cup		Asia		Total	
Club	Season	Division	Apps	Goals	Apps	Goals	Apps	Goals	Apps	Goals
Khan Research Laboratories	2009–10	Pakistan Premier League	16	3	6	1	—		22	4
Khan Research Laboratories	2010–11	Pakistan Premier League	23	4	6	3	1 (Note: Appearances in AFC President's Cup)	0	30	7
Khan Research Laboratories	2011–12	Pakistan Premier League	18	2	6	6	—		24	8
Khan Research Laboratories	2012–13	Pakistan Premier League	27	6	4	0	3	0	34	6
Khan Research Laboratories	2013–14	Pakistan Premier League	30	5	4	1	3	0	37	6
Khan Research Laboratories	2014–15	Pakistan Premier League	15	1	6	0	2	0	30	13
Khan Research Laboratories	2018–19	Pakistan Premier League	0	0	—		—		0	0
Career total			129	21	32	11	11	0	172	32

=== International ===
Appearances and goals by national team and year
National team	Year	Apps	Goals
Pakistan	2011	6	0
Pakistan	2013	1	0
Total		7	0

=== U23 ===
#	Date	Venue	Opponent	Score	Result	Competition
1	2 February 2010	M. A. Aziz Stadium, Dhaka, Bangladesh	India	1–0	1–5	2010 South Asian Games

== Honours ==
Khan Research Laboratories

- Pakistan Premier League: 2009–10, 2011–12, 2012–13, 2013–14, 2018–19
- National Football Challenge Cup: 2010, 2011, 2012, 2015, 2016
