= 1985 Inter-Provincial Championship =

Tournament details
- Country: Pakistan
- City: Faisalabad
- Dates: 1984
- Teams: 14

Final positions
- Champions: Habib Bank (1st title)
- Runners-up: Punjab
- Third place: NWFP
- Fourth place: Sindh

Tournament statistics
- Matches played: 23
- Goals scored: 44 (1.91 per match)
- All statistics correct as of 23 July 2025.

The 1985 Inter-Provincial Championship was the 3rd edition of the now known PFF National Challenge Cup, the main cup tournament in Pakistani football. It was held in Faisalabad.

== Overview ==
Pakistan Airlines were the defending champions, winning the 1984 edition. Habib Bank won the title after winning in penalty shootout against Punjab provincial team, after a goalless draw. National Bank were officially declared runners-up, as the provincial teams, Balochistan, Sindh, NWFP, and Punjab, were not included in the final rankings. Following their victory in the 1985 Inter-Provincial Championship, Habib Bank became the country's second representative in Asian club football competitions.

== Group stage ==
=== Group 1 ===
Pos	Team	Pld	W	D	L	GF	GA	GD	Pts
1	Punjab	3	2	1	0	4	2	+2	5
2	Pakistan Airlines	3	2	0	1	4	1	+3	4
3	Pakistan Customs	3	0	2	1	2	3	−1	2
4	Pakistan Army	3	0	1	2	0	4	−4	1

Source: RSSSF

=== Group 2 ===
Pos	Team	Pld	W	D	L	GF	GA	GD	Pts
1	Habib Bank	3	2	1	0	5	1	+4	5
2	National Bank	3	2	1	0	4	0	+4	5
3	Pakistan Steel	3	1	0	2	2	5	−3	2
4	Balochistan	3	0	0	3	1	6	−5	0

Source: RSSSF

=== Group 3 ===
Pos	Team	Pld	W	D	L	GF	GA	GD	Pts
1	Sindh	3	2	1	0	4	2	+2	5
2	Pakistan Air Force	3	1	1	1	8	4	+4	3
3	WAPDA	3	0	3	0	3	3	0	3
4	Pakistan Police	3	0	1	2	0	6	−6	1

Source: RSSSF

=== Group 4 ===
Pos	Team	Pld	W	D	L	GF	GA	GD	Pts
1	NWFP	1	0	1	0	0	0	0	1
2	Pakistan Railways	1	0	1	0	0	0	0	1

Source: RSSSF

== Knockout round ==
=== Semifinals ===
1985

Punjab	4–1	NWFP
	Report

1985

Habib Bank	1–0	Sindh
	Report

=== Third place match ===
1985

NWFP	1–0	Sindh
	Report

=== Final ===
1985

Habib Bank	0–0	Punjab
	Report
Penalties
	4–3
