= 2010 National Challenge Cup =

Tournament details
- Country: Pakistan
- Venue: Multan
- Teams: 16(Officially); 15(Participated)

Final positions
- Champions: Khan Research Laboratories (2nd title)
- Runners-up: Pakistan Navy
- Third place: Pakistan Army
- Fourth place: WAPDA

Tournament statistics
- Matches played: 29
- Goals scored: 92 (3.17 per match)
- All statistics correct as of 29 April 2010.

The 2010 National Challenge Cup was the 20th edition of National Challenge Cup, the main cup competition in Pakistani football. The tournament was held in Multan.

A total of 16 were participating in the tournament, but Karachi Port Trust withdrew few days before the start of tournaments.

Khan Research Laboratories were the defending champions, winning the previous edition defeating Pakistan Airforce in the finals.

Khan Research Laboratories successfully defended the title, as they went on to defeat Pakistan Navy 4–0 in the finals.

== Group stage ==
=== Group A ===
Pos	Team	Pld	W	D	L	GF	GA	GD	Pts	Qualification
1	Pakistan Air Force	2	2	0	0	6	2	+4	6	Advance to Knockout round
2	WAPDA	2	1	0	1	5	3	+2	3	Advance to Knockout round
3	Pakistan Railways	2	0	0	2	2	8	−6	0	

Updated to match(es) played on 23 April 2010. Source: RSSSF
17 April 2010

WAPDA	5–0	Pakistan Railways
	Report

20 April 2010

Pakistan Air Force	3–0	WAPDA
	Report

22 April 2010

Pakistan Air Force	3–2	Pakistan Railways
	Report

=== Group B ===
Pos	Team	Pld	W	D	L	GF	GA	GD	Pts	Qualification
1	Pakistan Army	3	3	0	0	8	1	+7	9	Advance to Knockout round
2	Pakistan Airlines	3	2	0	1	5	4	+1	6	Advance to Knockout round
3	Sui Southern Gas	3	1	0	2	5	7	−2	3	
4	Pakistan Police	3	0	0	3	2	8	−6	0	

Updated to match(es) played on 23 April 2010. Source: RSSSF
17 April 2010

Pakistan Army	2–0	Pakistan Police
	Report

17 April 2010

Pakistan Airlines	2–1	Sui Southern Gas
	Report

20 April 2010

Pakistan Airlines	2–1	Pakistan Police
	Report

20 April 2010

Pakistan Army	4–0	Sui Southern Gas
	Report

22 April 2010

Sui Southern Gas	4–1	Pakistan Police
	Report

22 April 2010

Pakistan Army	2–1	Pakistan Airlines
	Report

=== Group C ===
Pos	Team	Pld	W	D	L	GF	GA	GD	Pts	Qualification
1	Khan Research Laboratories	3	3	0	0	9	0	+9	9	Advance to Knockout round
2	Karachi Electric Supply Corporation	3	2	0	1	12	2	+10	6	Advance to Knockout round
3	Habib Bank	3	1	0	2	4	5	−1	3	
4	Ashraf Sugar Mills	3	0	0	3	0	18	−18	0	

Updated to match(es) played on 23 April 2010. Source: RSSSF
19 April 2010

Karachi Electric Supply Corporation	4–1	Habib Bank
	Report

19 April 2010

Khan Research Laboratories	7–0	Ashraf Sugar Mills
	Report

21 April 2010

Habib Bank	0–1	Khan Research Laboratories
	Report

21 April 2010

Karachi Electric Supply Corporation	8–0	Ashraf Sugar Mills
	Report

23 April 2010

Khan Research Laboratories	1–0	Karachi Electric Supply Corporation
	Report

23 April 2010

Habib Bank	3–0	Ashraf Sugar Mills
	Report

=== Group D ===
Pos	Team	Pld	W	D	L	GF	GA	GD	Pts	Qualification
1	National Bank	3	3	0	0	5	2	+3	9	Advance to Knockout round
2	Pakistan Navy	3	2	0	1	3	2	+1	6	Advance to Knockout round
3	Pak Elektron	3	1	0	2	4	3	+1	3	
4	DFA Multan	3	0	0	3	2	7	−5	0	

Updated to match(es) played on 23 April 2010. Source: RSSSF
16 April 2010

DFA Multan	0–1	Pakistan Navy
	Report

16 April 2010

National Bank	1–0	Pak Elektron
	Report

18 April 2010

National Bank	1–0	Pakistan Navy
	Report

18 April 2010

DFA Multan	0–3	Pak Elektron
	Report

18 April 2010

Pakistan Navy	2–1	Pak Elektron
	Report

18 April 2010

DFA Multan	2–3	National Bank
	Report

== Knockout round ==
=== Quarter-finals ===
24 April 2010

Pakistan Navy	1–1 (a.e.t.)	Pakistan Air Force
	Report
Penalties
	7–6

24 April 2010

WAPDA	3–0	National Bank
	Report

25 April 2010

Pakistan Army	0–0 (a.e.t.)	Karachi Electric Supply Corporation
	Report
Penalties
	4–1

25 April 2010

Khan Research Laboratories	2–0	Pakistan Airlines
	Report

=== Semi-finals ===
27 April 2010

Pakistan Navy	1–0 (a.e.t.)	Pakistan Army
	Report

27 April 2010

WAPDA	1–1 (a.e.t.)	Khan Research Laboratories
	Report
Penalties
	3–5

=== Third-place match ===
28 April 2010

Pakistan Army	3–3 (a.e.t.)	WAPDA
	Report
Penalties
	5–3

=== Final ===
29 April 2010

Pakistan Navy	0–4	Khan Research Laboratories
	Report	Ishaq 2'; Kaleemullah 22'; Zubair Ahmed 63'; Abid Ghafoor 76'

Qilla Kuhna Qasim Bagh, Multan
