= 2009 National Challenge Cup =

Tournament details
- Country: Pakistan
- Venue: Hyderabad
- Teams: 16

Final positions
- Champions: Khan Research Laboratories (1st title)
- Runners-up: Pakistan Airlines
- Third place: Pakistan Navy
- Fourth place: WAPDA

Tournament statistics
- Matches played: 32
- Goals scored: 118 (3.69 per match)
- All statistics correct as of 28 April 2009.

The 2009 National Challenge Cup was the 19th edition of National Challenge Cup. The tournament was hosted by Hyderabad. The tournament started on 18 April and concluded on 28 April.

Pakistan Navy were the defending champions, they were eliminated in the semi-finals by the eventual winners Khan Research Laboratories, who won their first major trophy since establishment.

== Group stage ==
=== Group A ===
Pos	Team	Pld	W	D	L	GF	GA	GD	Pts
1	WAPDA	3	3	0	0	13	2	+11	9
2	Habib Bank	3	2	0	1	12	4	+8	6
3	Pakistan Airforce	3	1	0	2	7	5	+2	3
4	Higher Education Commission	3	0	0	3	1	22	−21	0

Source: RSSSF
15 April 2009
14:00 PST

WAPDA	2–0	Pakistan Airforce
	Report

15 April 2009
16:45 PST

Habib Bank	8–0	Higher Education Commission
	Report

17 April 2009
14:00 PST

Pakistan Airforce	1–2	Habib Bank
	Report

17 April 2009
16:45 PST

WAPDA	8–0	Higher Education Commission
	Report

19 April 2009
14:00 PST

WAPDA	3–2	Habib Bank
	Report

19 April 2009
16:45 PST

Pakistan Airforce	6–1	Higher Education Commission
	Report

=== Group B ===
Pos	Team	Pld	W	D	L	GF	GA	GD	Pts
1	Pakistan Airlines	3	2	1	0	10	4	+6	7
2	Pakistan Army	3	2	1	0	7	3	+4	7
3	Pakistan Steel	3	1	0	2	5	12	−7	3
4	Sui Southern Gas	3	0	0	3	5	8	−3	0

Source: RSSSF
16 April 2009
14:00 PST

Pakistan Army	2–1	Sui Southern Gas
	Report

16 April 2009
14:00 PST

Pakistan Airlines	6–1	Pakistan Steel
	Report

18 April 2009
14:00 PST

Pakistan Steel	0–3	Pakistan Army
	Report

18 April 2009
14:00 PST

Sui Southern Gas	1–2	Pakistan Airlines
	Report

20 April 2009
14:00 PST

Pakistan Airlines	2–2	Pakistan Army
	Report

20 April 2009
14:00 PST

Sui Southern Gas	3–4	Pakistan Steel
	Report

=== Group C ===
Pos	Team	Pld	W	D	L	GF	GA	GD	Pts
1	Khan Research Laboratories	3	3	0	0	9	2	+7	9
2	Sindh Government Press	3	1	1	1	3	4	−1	4
3	Karachi Electric Supply Corporation	3	1	1	1	2	4	−2	4
4	National Bank	3	0	0	3	3	7	−4	0

Source: RSSSF
15 April 2009
16:45 PST

Khan Research Laboratories	2–0	Sindh Government Press
	Report

15 April 2009
16:45 PST

National Bank	0–1	Karachi Electric Supply Corporation
	Report

17 April 2009
16:45 PST

National Bank	2–3	Sindh Government Press
	Report

17 April 2009
16:45 PST

Khan Research Laboratories	4–1	Karachi Electric Supply Corporation
	Report

19 April 2009
16:45 PST

Sindh Government Press	0–0	Karachi Electric Supply Corporation
	Report

19 April 2009
16:45 PST

National Bank	1–3	Khan Research Laboratories
	Report

=== Group D ===
Pos	Team	Pld	W	D	L	GF	GA	GD	Pts
1	Pakistan Navy	3	2	1	0	4	2	+2	7
2	Karachi Port Trust	3	2	0	1	9	3	+6	6
3	Pak Elektron	3	1	1	1	7	3	+4	4
4	DFA Hyderabad	3	0	0	3	0	12	−12	0

Source: RSSSF
16 April 2009
16:45 PST

Pakistan Navy	1–1	Pak Elektron
	Report

16 April 2009
16:45 PST

Karachi Port Trust	6–1	DFA Hyderabad
	Report

18 April 2009
16:45 PST

DFA Hyderabad	0–1	Pakistan Navy
	Report

18 April 2009
16:45 PST

Karachi Port Trust	2–1	Pak Elektron
	Report

20 April 2009
16:45 PST

Pak Elektron	5–0	DFA Hyderabad
	Report

20 April 2009
16:45 PST

Pakistan Navy	2–1	Karachi Port Trust
	Report

== Knockout round ==
=== Quarter-finals ===
April 23, 2009

WAPDA	2–1	Karachi Port Trust
Ayaz 67'; Raj 72'		A. Rehman 76'

April 23, 2009

Pakistan Navy	2–2 (a.e.t.)	Habib Bank
Mehmood 85', 115'		Ishtiaq 60'; Z. Lashari 115'
Penalties
	2–1

April 24, 2009

Pakistan Airlines	5–0	Sindh Government Press
Haji 18'; Nazeer 45'; S. Lashari 62'; Nasrullah 87'; A. Ghaffar 90'

April 24, 2009

Khan Research Laboratories	0–0 (a.e.t.)	Pakistan Army
Penalties
	5–4

=== Semi-finals ===
April 26, 2009

Khan Research Laboratories	2–1	Pakistan Navy
Kaleemullah 15'; Qasim 69'		Bakhsh 60'

April 26, 2009

WAPDA	1–2	Pakistan Airlines
Hayat 21'		S. Lashari 45', 68'

=== Third place match ===
April 27, 2009

WAPDA	1–1 (a.e.t.)	Pakistan Navy
Asif 55'		Qadir 44'
Penalties
	3–4

=== Final ===
April 28, 2009

Pakistan Airlines	0–1	Khan Research Laboratories
		Qasim 64'
