= Pakistan Police FC =

Pakistani football club

Pakistan Police
- Full name: Pakistan Police Football Club
- Nickname: The Policemen
- Short name: PPFC
- Ground: Sadiq Shaheed Stadium, Quetta
- Capacity: 5,000
- Owner: Pakistan Police Sports Board

Pakistan Police Football Club served as the football section of the Pakistan Police Sports Board. The football section has historically been administered by the Balochistan Police, which was entrusted with representing Pakistan Police in football nationwide. The club used to compete in the National Football Championship and Pakistan Premier League, the top tier of national football league system. The club also regularly participated in the PFF National Challenge Cup.

== History ==
=== Early history ===
Pakistan Police first participated in Karachi Football League in 1962. In 1984, the club entered the Interprovincial Championship, where they topped their group which included the NWFP, Habib Bank and Pakistan Navy, they lost 4–0 to Balochistan in semi-finals. In 1985, they finished bottom of their group in the Interprovincial Championship. In 1996, the club participated in the 1996 PFF President's Cup, where they lost all three of their matches, to Quetta Metropolitan, Muslim Commercial Bank and Pakistan Railways. In the 1998 PFF President's Cup, the club reached the semi-finals, losing 1–0 to Karachi Port Trust. In 1999, the club finished bottom of their group in the National Football Championship. The same year, they participated in PFF President's Cup, losing 1–0 to Pakistan Army in the quarter-finals. In 2000, the club reached the quarter-finals of the National Football Championship, again losing (3–1) to Pakistan Army. In the 2001 season, the club reached their highest position in top-division, when they reached semi-finals of 2001 National Football Championship, losing 2–1 to Khan Research Laboratories. In 2019 PFF National Challenge Cup, the club reached quarter-finals after defeating Asia Ghee Mills 5–0 in their final group stage match. They got knocked out by Khan Research Laboratories with a 6–1 defeat.

=== Football Federation League ===
The club then entered the Football Federation League following the domestic revamp in the country from the 2004–05 season, they finished bottom of their group. In 2005, the club participated in 2005 National Football Challenge Cup, topping their preliminary group. In 2010–11 Pakistan Football Federation League, they won the tournament after defeating local rivals, Muslim 2–1 in the finals, earning promotion to 2011–12 Pakistan Premier League. The club stayed in the Pakistan Premier League for one season, as they got relegated at the end of 2011–12 season. The club failed to earn promotion in three back-to-back season, with their league appearance coming back in the 2014–15 Pakistan Football Federation League. In the 2020-21 Football Federation League, they topped the Group B table.

Following the domestic football revamp in the country in 2023, departmental clubs including Police remained competing in the PFF National Challenge Cup.

=== Sports programme suspension ===
In late 2025, following the conclusion of the National Games, the Balochistan Police suspended its sports programme and reassigned their athletes to regular policing and administrative duties, citing worsening law-and-order conditions in the province. As a result, several footballers were deployed to police stations, checkpoints and security duties, preventing the Balochistan-based squad from participating in football competitions, including the 2026 Chief Minister Balochistan Gold Cup.

== Club Administration and Structure ==
The Pakistan Police Sports Board consists of representatives from provincial police organisations, including Punjab Police, Sindh Police, Khyber Pakhtunkhwa Police, Balochistan Police and other federal branches, and oversees around 30 sporting disciplines. Since 1972, however, the football section has been administered by the Balochistan Police, which was entrusted with representing the Pakistan Police in football nationwide. Players have been recruited from different regions of Pakistan for national competitions, and are employed under a sports quota.

== Stadium ==
Like several Pakistan domestic football teams, Pakistan Police does not own a dedicated ground. Hence the team used several municipal venues in Quetta for its home fixtures. The club usually have used the Sadiq Shaheed Stadium for its home fixtures for the Pakistan Premier League.

== Honours ==
- Pakistan Football Federation League
  - Champions (1): 2010
- National Games: 1
  - Winners (1): 2023
