= Aurangzeb Baloch =

Pakistani footballer

Personal information
- Date of birth: 23 February 1991 (age 35)
- Place of birth: Karachi, Pakistan
- Height: 1.70 m (5 ft 7 in)
- Positions: Defensive midfielder; defender

Senior career*
Years	Team	Apps	(Gls)
2011–2020	K-Electric		

International career
2010	Pakistan U23		
- * Club domestic league appearances and goals

Aurangzeb Baloch (born 23 February 1991) is a Pakistani former professional footballer who played as a midfielder for K-Electric.

== International career ==
Baloch competed at the 2010 Asian Games as part of the Pakistan national football team.
