= 2011 Pakistan Premier League =

Pakistan Premier League
- Season: 2011
- Dates: 5 July 2011 – 29 December 2011
- Champions: Khan Research Laboratories; 2nd Premier League title 2nd Pakistani title
- Relegated: Pakistan Police; Pak Elektron
- 2012 AFC President's Cup: Khan Research Laboratories
- Matches: 240
- Goals: 556 (2.32 per match)
- Top goalscorer: Jadeed Khan (22 goals)
- Biggest home win: Habib Bank 9–1 Pak Elektron (16 September 2011)
- Biggest away win: Karachi Port Trust 0–4 Pakistan Airlines; Karachi Port Trust 0–4 Khan Research Laboratories; Pakistan Airlines 0–4 Khan Research Laboratories; Muslim 0–4 Khan Research Laboratories
- Highest scoring: Habib Bank 9–1 Pak Elektron (16 September 2011)
- Longest winning run: 10 games Khan Research Laboratories
- Longest unbeaten run: 24 games Khan Research Laboratories
- Longest winless run: 22 games Pak Elektron
- Longest losing run: 9 games Pak Elektron

The 2011 Pakistan Premier League was the 57th season of Pakistan domestic football and the 8th season of the Pakistan Premier League, the top tier of the Pakistan football league system. The season started on 5 July 2011 under the auspices of Pakistan Football Federation (PFF), and ended on 29 December 2011, with a midseason break between 30 July and 14 September.

KRL F.C. successfully defended its pursuit of the league title, under head coach Tariq Lufti, losing only one game the entire season. Their prize, Rs 700,000. Afghan Club were the surprise of the season finishing second, the first time since the founding of PPL that a non-departmental club placed in the top three positions; their prize, Rs 500,000. Pakistan Army F.C. finished third and received Rs 400,000.

PIA F.C. took the Fair-Play trophy and Rs 100,000. Cheques of Rs 100,000 each were presented to the leading scorer Jadeed Khan Pathan (Afghan Club, 22 goals) and the best goalkeeper Jaffar Khan (Pakistan Army F.C.).

The best player award prize of Rs 150,000 went to KRL F.C.’s skipper Samar Ishaq. Rs 100,000 each were presented to the two Rawalpindi officials: the best referee Waheed Murad and the best match commissioner Zaman Khan. The best assistant referee Adnan Anjum received Rs 50,000. Both Pakistan Police F.C. and PEL F.C. were relegated.

== Format ==
Teams played each other on a home and away basis

The winners represented Pakistan at the 2012 AFC President's Cup. The bottom two teams were relegated to the Pakistan Football Federation League.

== Venues ==
The 2011 Pakistan Premier League was staged across designated host grounds rather than strict club home stadiums. The venues included Karachi (Peoples Sports Complex, KPT Stadium, Korangi Baloch Stadium), Quetta (Sadiq Shaheed Stadium), Nushki (Nushki Stadium), Chaman (Govt High School Stadium), Faisalabad (University of Agriculture Ground, Punjab Medical College Ground), Rawalpindi (Municipal Football Stadium) and Islamabad (Jinnah Stadium).

== Teams ==
SSGC F.C. and Young Blood F.C. were relegated at the end of the 2010 campaign and were replaced by Muslim F.C. and Pakistan Police F.C., both representing the city of Quetta.

Locations of teams in the 2011 PPL

Club	City
Afghan F.C.	Chaman
Baloch F.C.	Nushki
Habib Bank Limited F.C.	Karachi
Karachi Electric Supply Corporation F.C.	Karachi
Pak Elektron Limited Football Club.	Quetta
Karachi Port Trust F.C	Karachi
Khan Research Laboratories F.C.	Rawalpindi
Muslim F.C.	Quetta
National Bank of Pakistan F.C.	Karachi
Pakistan Air Force F.C.	Rawalpindi
Pakistan Army F.C.	Rawalpindi
Pakistan International Airlines F.C.	Karachi
Pakistan Navy F.C.	Rawalpindi
Pakistan Police F.C.	Quetta
PMC Club Athletico Faisalabad	Faisalabad
Water & Power Development Authority F.C.	Lahore

== League standings ==
Pos	Team	Pld	W	D	L	GF	GA	GD	Pts	Qualification or relegation
1	Khan Research Laboratories (C)	30	24	5	1	56	10	+46	77	2012 AFC President's Cup
2	Afghan Chaman	30	16	9	5	52	24	+28	57	
3	Pakistan Army	30	17	6	7	35	22	+13	57	
4	WAPDA	30	15	7	8	41	25	+16	52	
5	Karachi Electric Supply Corporation	30	15	6	9	41	30	+11	51	
6	Muslim	30	15	6	9	40	33	+7	51	
7	Pakistan Airlines	30	14	7	9	50	33	+17	49	
8	National Bank	30	14	3	13	41	26	+15	45	
9	Habib Bank	30	10	10	10	34	29	+5	40	
10	Pakistan Navy	30	8	11	11	34	34	0	35	
11	Pakistan Airforce	30	7	12	11	23	29	−6	33	
12	Karachi Port Trust	30	9	5	16	38	58	−20	32	
13	Baloch Nushki	30	7	7	16	26	40	−14	28	
14	PMC Athletico	30	7	6	17	17	36	−19	27	
15	Pakistan Police (R)	30	7	3	20	28	63	−35	24	Relegation to 2012 PFF League
16	Pak Elektron (R)	30	1	5	24	10	74	−64	8	Relegation to 2012 PFF League

Updated to match(es) played on 29 December 2011. Source:
Rules for classification: 1) points; 2) goal difference; 3) number of goals scored.
(C) Champions; (R) Relegated

== Statistics ==
=== Hat-tricks ===
Player	For	Against	Result	Date	Ref.
Mohammad Atif	Habib Bank	Pak Elektron	9–1	16 September 2011	
Zahid Ahmed	Pakistan Police	Pak Elektron	4–0	21 September 2011	
Muhammad Essa	Karachi Electric Supply Corporation	Pakistan Police	4–1	24 September 2011	
Zabiullah^{4}	Afghan Chaman	Baloch Nushki	4–1	4 November 2011	
Nomi Gill Martin	Pakistan Navy	Habib Bank	3–0	15 November 2011	
Jadeed Khan	Afghan Chaman	Baloch Nushki	3–1	12 December 2011	

^{4} Player scored four goals

== Champions ==
Pakistan Premier League 2011

2nd title
