= SSGC FC =

Pakistani football club

Sui Southern Gas
- Full name: Sui Southern Gas Company Football Club
- Short name: SSGC
- Dissolved: 2021; 5 years ago
- Ground: Korangi Baloch Stadium
- Capacity: 5,000
- Owner: Sui Southern Gas Company
Home colours	Away colours

Sui Southern Gas Company Football Club, commonly known as SSGC or Sui Southern Gas, served as the football section of Sui Southern Gas Company. The club used to compete in the Pakistan Premier League.

Based in Karachi, they played their home games at the Korangi Baloch Stadium.

== History ==
=== Early years ===
Sui Southern Gas Company first competed in 1996 PFF President's Cup, where they were placed in the same group as Pakistan Army and Pakistan Telecommunication. Sui Gas lost both their matches, 5–0 and 3–2, respectively. In 1998, the club competed in the 1998 President's PFF Cup, losing and drawing their group stage matches 2–0 and 3–3 to Crescent Textile Mills and Karachi Port Trust, respectively, as they were knocked out of the tournament, finishing third.

In 1999, the club took part in All Pakistan Dr Abdul Qadeer Khan Football Tournament, where they were knocked out in the first match, losing to Mahfooz Club in the preliminary round. Their next tournament participation in All-Pakistan Prime Minister's Peace Cup saw them lose 5–1 to Pakistan Public Work Department. In the 1999 President PFF Cup, Sui Southern Gas recorded their first ever win when they defeated Karachi Metropolitan Corporation 2–0 in the group stage after drawing 0–0 with PIA, it was the first time ever that Sui Gas qualified to second round in any competition. In Round of 16, they drew 2–2 with WAPDA, losing 5–4 on penalties.

Sui Gas' first appearance in the National Championship came in 2000, when reached the Round of 16, only to be knocked out by eventual winners Allied Bank.

In 2003, the club reached the semi-finals of the inaugural All-Pakistan Tapal Tezdum Invitation Football Tournament, where they lost 1–0 Karachi Electric Supply Corporation. The same year Sui Gas were runners-up to Habib Bank after losing 4–2 on penalties in the finals of All Pakistan Shaheed Zulfiqar Ali Bhutto Memorial Football Tournament.

=== 2004–2021 ===
Sui Gas played in the second division, PFF National League in 2005–06 season, finishing last in their group after conceding 17 goals in 6 matches whilst scoring only 5, causing them to crash-out of the promotional play-offs. In 2005 National Football Challenge Cup Sui Gas finished third in their group, 2 points behind second placed Pakistan Navy as they missed out on the knock-out stages. In 2006–07 season, Sui Gas won the third place match against Bannu Red 2–1 after losing 0–1 to Pakistan Television in the semi-finals of the 2006 PFF Cup.

In 2007–08 season, Sui Gas topped their preliminary group in the second division finishing ahead of Pakistan Steel and Pakistan Public Work Department, although the club finished third in the "Super Six" group, just four points away of promotion to the Pakistan Premier League. In 2008 National Football Challenge Cup, Sui Gas was placed in group with league winners WAPDA and National Bank, losing both of their games 9–0 and 2–0 respectively.

Sui Gas finished as the group leaders in the 2008–09 second division, beating Sindh Government Press on goal differences for the first position. They lost the semi-final match against Pakistan Railways 1–0, missing out on the promotion. Sui finished bottom of the group in 2009 National Football Challenge Cup, losing all of their matches to Pakistan Army, Pakistan Airlines and Pakistan Steel.

In 2009–10 second division Sui Gas finished second in group behind Sindh Government Press, in semi-final they defeated Higher Education Commission 4–0 and in final they won against Pakistan Television 1–0, earning promotion to 2010–11 Pakistan Premier League. In 2010 National Football Challenge Cup, they finished third in the group as they were crashed out of the tournament. They also competed in KPT-PFF Cup, finishing bottom of the group.

Sui Gas got relegated to second division after finishing 15th in the 2010–11 Pakistan Premier League, gaining only 20 points from 30 matches. Despite relegation, Asim Faiz of Sui Gas became the second best scorer in the league with a season of 16 goals, 4 behind the top-scorer Arif Mehmood.

=== Disbandment ===
The club was closed after the shutdown of departmental sports in Pakistan in September 2021. After the restoration of departmental sports in Pakistan, SSGC terminated contracts of the players of the squad on 26 August 2022.

== Honours ==
- PFF League
  - Champions (1): 2009–10
