= 2010 Pakistan Premier League =

Pakistan Premier League
- Season: 2010
- Dates: 16 September 2010 – 30 December 2010
- Champions: WAPDA; 4th Premier League title 8th Pakistani title
- Relegated: Sui Southern Gas; Young Blood
- AFC President's Cup: WAPDA
- Matches: 240
- Goals: 615 (2.56 per match)
- Top goalscorer: Arif Mehmood (21 goals)
- Biggest home win: Pakistan Navy 6–0 Sui Southern Gas (25 October 2011)
- Biggest away win: Sui Southern Gas 1–6 Karachi Electric Supply Corporation (1 November 2011)
- Highest scoring: Sui Southern Gas 6–2 Young Blood (26 November 2011)
- Longest winning run: 12 games WAPDA
- Longest unbeaten run: 13 games WAPDA
- Longest winless run: 15 games Young Blood
- Longest losing run: 7 games Young Blood

The 2010 Pakistan Premier League for professional association football was the 7th season of the Pakistan Premier League, since its establishment in 2004, and the 56th season of Pakistan domestic league. The season began on 16 September 2010 and finished on 30 December 2010. Khan Research Laboratories were the defending champions.

WAPDA won the league, it was their 4th Premier League and 8th Pakistani league title.

Besides the title and the winner's trophy, WAPDA F.C. received Rs 600,000, while the last edition's winners KRL received Rs 400,000 as runners-up. PIA F.C. came in third and received Rs 300,000. PIA shot-stopper Muhammad Haji was adjudged the Most Valuable Player (MVP) and pocketed Rs 100,000 while leading marksman Arif Mehmood and best goalkeeper Muhammad Omer (KESC F.C.) took Rs50,000 each. Chaman's Afghan F.C. were given Rs 100,000 as winners of the Fair Play trophy. Rs 50,000 each went to the best referee Jehangir Khan and the best match commissioner Gohar Zaman while the best assistant referee Irshad-ul-Haq received Rs25,000.

== Format ==
Teams play each other on a home and away basis

The winners will represent Pakistan at the 2011 AFC President's Cup. The bottom two teams will be relegated to the Pakistan Football Federation League.

== Location and stadia ==
Locations of teams in the 2010 PPL

Club	City	Stadium
Afghan Chaman	Chaman	Jamal Nasir Stadium
Baloch Nushki	Nushki	Nushki Stadium
Habib Bank	Karachi	Peoples Football Stadium
Karachi Electric Supply Corporation	Karachi	Peoples Football Stadium
Pak Elektron	Lahore	Model Town Football Ground
Karachi Port Trust	Karachi	Karachi Port Trust Stadium
Khan Research Laboratories	Rawalpindi	KRL Football Stadium
National Bank of Pakistan	Karachi	Korangi Baloch Stadium
Pakistan Air Force	Peshawar	PAF Sports Complex
Pakistan Army	Rawalpindi	Army Stadium
Pakistan International Airlines	Karachi	Korangi Baloch Stadium
Pakistan Navy	Quetta	Naval Sports Complex
PMC Club Athletico Faisalabad	Faisalabad	Railways Ground
SSGC	Karachi	
WAPDA	Lahore	Railway Stadium
Young Blood	Sahiwal	Ali Rai Nawaz Stadium

== League table ==
Pos	Team	Pld	W	D	L	GF	GA	GD	Pts	Qualification or relegation
1	WAPDA (C)	30	21	4	5	60	21	+39	67	Qualification to 2011 AFC President's Cup
2	Khan Research Laboratories	30	17	7	6	37	16	+21	58	
3	Pakistan Airlines	30	16	9	5	49	23	+26	57	
4	Karachi Electric Supply Corporation	30	16	7	7	58	28	+30	55	
5	Pakistan Army	30	15	9	6	41	22	+19	54	
6	Karachi Port Trust	30	15	6	9	54	41	+13	51	
7	Pakistan Airforce	30	12	9	9	31	30	+1	45	
8	Afghan Chaman	30	12	6	12	43	34	+9	42	
9	Pakistan Navy	30	11	9	10	33	35	−2	42	
10	Pak Elektron	30	11	5	14	36	47	−11	38	
11	Baloch Nushki	30	8	10	12	31	34	−3	34	
12	National Bank	30	7	13	10	35	45	−10	34	
13	Habib Bank	30	6	7	17	26	40	−14	25	
14	PMC Athletico	30	5	6	19	22	54	−32	21	
15	Sui Southern Gas (R)	30	5	5	20	20	36	−16	20	Relegation to 2011 PFF League
16	Young Blood (R)	30	4	6	20	23	73	−50	18	Relegation to 2011 PFF League

Updated to match(es) played on 30 December 2010. Source:
Rules for classification: 1) points; 2) goal difference; 3) number of goals scored.
(C) Champions; (R) Relegated

== Results ==
Home \ Away	AFG	ARM	BAL	HBL	KESC	KPT	KRL	NAV	NBP	PAF	PEL	PIA	PMC	SSGC	WAP	YB
Afghan Chaman	—	0–0	2–1	1–0	3–2	3–0	0–1	3–0	4–1	3–0	1–2	3–0	0–1	3–0	0–0	6–1
Pakistan Army	1–0	—	2–2	1–0	0–0	4–0	1–1	0–1	3–1	0–1	2–1	0–1	1–0	1–0	1–2	1–0
Baloch Nushki	0–0	0–1	—	1–0	0–0	0–0	1–2	3–0	0–0	3–0	0–3	0–0	1–2	3–0	1–2	2–0
Habib Bank	1–1	0–2	0–1	—	0–3	1–2	0–2	3–0	0–0	2–2	2–0	0–0	4–1	1–1	0–2	3–0
Karachi Electric Supply Corporation	4–2	1–1	1–0	2–0	—	2–0	1–0	1–1	1–1	0–2	3–0	0–1	5–0	6–1	0–2	0–0
Karachi Port Trust	2–2	2–2	4–3	3–0	1–3	—	0–1	0–1	2–2	0–1	2–0	2–1	4–2	2–1	1–0	6–1
Khan Research Laboratories	0–1	0–2	0–0	1–0	3–0	1–0	—	1–1	0–0	0–0	1–1	1–3	2–0	1–0	1–3	2–0
Pakistan Navy	2–1	0–1	3–1	2–1	1–2	1–4	0–2	—	2–1	0–0	1–2	1–1	1–0	6–0	0–0	1–1
National Bank	1–4	0–0	2–2	0–0	1–4	2–4	0–2	1–1	—	0–0	3–1	1–2	2–1	1–0	1–3	4–1
Pakistan Airforce	1–0	1–3	3–0	2–0	1–0	1–2	0–2	0–0	2–0	—	0–2	1–2	0–0	3–2	0–2	1–0
Pak Elektron	1–1	1–2	2–0	2–1	1–3	2–1	0–4	1–0	0–1	2–2	—	1–2	1–0	1–3	2–2	2–1
Pakistan Airlines	2–0	2–1	0–1	1–2	1–1	0–0	0–0	2–3	3–3	2–2	1–0	—	2–0	3–1	1–0	5–0
PMC Club Athletico Faisalabad	0–1	1–1	1–1	1–0	1–2	1–1	1–2	0–3	1–1	0–1	2–1	1–1	—	2–1	0–3	1–2
Sui Southern Gas	2–1	1–4	1–2	3–3	1–6	1–2	0–3	3–0	1–1	0–2	0–0	0–5	5–1	—	1–2	6–2
WAPDA	1–0	1–1	1–0	3–0	2–1	5–2	1–0	0–1	0–2	1–0	4–1	1–0	4–1	4–0	—	6–1
Young Blood	0–3	2–1	2–2	0–2	1–3	0–2	1–0	0–0	1–2	2–2	2–3	0–2	1–0	1–1	0–4	—

Source: RSSSF
Legend: Blue = home team win; Yellow = draw; Red = away team win.

== Statistics ==
=== Scoring ===
- First hat-trick of the season: Arif Mehmood for WAPDA against Young Blood (22 September 2010)
- Widest winning margin: 6 goals – WAPDA Pakistan Navy 6–0 Sui Southern Gas (25 October 2010)
- Most goals against one team: 6
  - WAPDA 6–1 Young Blood (24 September 2010)
  - Pakistan Navy 6–0 Sui Southern Gas (25 October 2010)
  - Sui Southern Gas 6–2 Young Blood (26 November 2010)
  - Karachi Port Trust 6–1 Young Blood (30 November 2010)
  - Afghan Chaman 6–1 Young Blood (25 December 2010)
  - Sui Southern Gas 1–6 Karachi Electric Supply Corporation (1 November 2010)
  - Karachi Electric Supply Corporation 6–1 Sui Southern Gas (14 November 2010)
    - This is the first time in the Premier League that any team has scored 6 goals against same team twice in one season.
- Most hat-tricks scored by one player: 2
  - Arif Mehmood for WAPDA
    - Young Blood 0–4 WAPDA (21 September 2010)
    - WAPDA 6–1 Young Blood (24 September 2010)
      - This is the first time in the Premier League that any player has scored a hat-trick against the same team twice in one season.
- Most hat-tricks by a team: 3
  - Karachi Electric Supply Corporation
    - Muhammad Essa v Sui Southern Gas (1 November 2010)
    - Muhammad Rasool v Afghan Chaman (8 November 2010)
    - Abdul Rehman v Sui Southern Gas (14 November 2010)
  - WAPDA
    - Arif Mehmood v Young Blood (21 September 2010)
    - Arif Mehmood v Young Blood (24 September 2010)
    - Khuda Bakhsh v Karachi Port Trust (22 October 2010)
- Team with most goals scored: 60 goals – WAPDA
- Team with fewest goals scored: 20 goals – Sui Southern Gas
- Team with fewest goals conceded: 16 goals – Khan Research Laboratories
- Team with most goals conceded: 73 goals – Young Blood

=== Top goalscorers ===
As of 30 December 2010

Rank	Scorer	Club	Goals
1	(Pakistan) Arif Mehmood	WAPDA	21
2	(Pakistan) Asim Faiz	Sui Southern Gas	16
3	(Pakistan) Abdul Rehman	Karachi Electric Supply Corporation	13
3	(Pakistan) Muhammad bin Younus	Karachi Port Trust	13
4	(Pakistan) Muhammad Essa	Karachi Electric Supply Corporation	12
5	(Pakistan) Muhammad Qasim	Khan Research Laboratories	11

=== Hat-tricks ===
As of 30 December 2010

Player	For	Against	Result	Date	Venue
Arif Mehmood	WAPDA	Young Blood	4–0	21 September 2010	Rai Ali Nawaz Stadium, Sahiwal
Arif Mehmood	WAPDA	Young Blood	/ 6–1	24 September 2010	Railway Stadium, Lahore
Zafar Majeed	Karachi Port Trust	National Bank	4–2	25 September 2010	Korangi Baloch Stadium, Karachi
Jadeed Khan	Afghan Chaman	Young Blood	3–0	14 October 2010	Rai Ali Nawaz Stadium, Sahiwal
Khuda Bakhsh	WAPDA	Karachi Port Trust	5–2	22 October 2010	Railway Stadium, Lahore
Nomi Martin Gill	Pakistan Navy	Sui Southern Gas	6–0	25 October 2010	Naval Sports Complex, Islamabad
Muhammad Essa	Karachi Electric Supply Corporation	Sui Southern Gas	6–1	1 November 2010	CDGK Stadium, Karachi
Muhammad Rasool	Karachi Electric Supply Corporation	Afghan Chaman	[ 3–0]	8 November 2010	Peoples Football Stadium, Karachi
Muhammad Qasim	Khan Research Laboratories	Pak Elektron	[ 4–0]	10 November 2010	MFTA Ground, Lahore
Abdul Rehman	Karachi Electric Supply Corporation	Sui Southern Gas	[ 6–1]	14 November 2010	Peoples Football Stadium, Karachi
Asim Faiz^{4}	Sui Southern Gas	Young Blood	[ 6–2]	26 December 2010	KPT Sports Complex, Karachi
Mohammad bin Younus	Karachi Port Trust	Young Blood	[6–1]	30 November 2010	KPT Sports Complex, Karachi
Muhammad Ashfaq	National Bank	Young Blood	[ 4–1]	2 December 2010	Korangi Baloch Stadium, Karachi
Sattar Mansuri	National Bank	Pak Elektron	[ 4–2]	28 December 2010	Peoples Football Stadium, Karachi

- ^{4} Player scored four goals

=== Awards ===
As of 30 December 2010

Award	Player	Club
Top Scorer	Arif Mehmood	WAPDA
Most Valuable Player	Muhammad Haji	Pakistan Airlines
Best Goalkeeper	Muhammad Omar	Karachi Electric Supply Corporation
Fair Play	—	Afghan Chaman

== See also ==
- Football in Pakistan
- List of football clubs in Pakistan
