= Asif Mehmood =

Pakistani politician

Member of the Provincial Assembly of the Punjab
- In office 29 May 2013 – 31 May 2018

Personal details
- Born: 14 August 1978 (age 47) Rawalpindi, Punjab, Pakistan
- Party: PTI (2013-present)

Asif Mehmood is a Pakistani politician who was a Member of the Provincial Assembly of the Punjab, from May 2013 to May 2018.

== Early life and education ==
He was born on 14 August 1978 in Rawalpindi.

He graduated in 2011 from University of the Punjab and has a degree of Bachelor of Arts.

== Political career ==
He was elected to the Provincial Assembly of the Punjab as a candidate of Pakistan Tehreek-e-Insaf from Constituency PP-9 (Rawalpindi-IX) in the 2013 Pakistani general election.
