= 2014 Kyrgyzstan Cup =

2014 Pirelli — Kyrgyzstan Cup
Tournament details
- Country: Kyrgyzstan
- Teams: 16

Final positions
- Champions: Dordoi
- Runner-up: Abdish ata

Tournament statistics
- Matches played: 16
- Goals scored: 50 (3.13 per match)
- Top goal scorer(s): Artur Mulajanov; Kalim Ullah (3 goals)

Awards
- Best player: Kalim Ullah

11 October 2014	Abdysh-Ata Kant	1–2 (a.e.t.)	FC Dordoi Bishkek	Kant
15:00 (UTC+6)	Musabekow 90+2'	Report	Murzayew 10'; Kaleemullah 81'	Referee: R. Shekerbekow
