= Sadiq Shaheed Stadium =

Football stadium in Pakistan

- صادق شہید سٹیڈیم
- Interactive map of Sadiq Shaheed Stadium
- Full name: Sadiq Shaheed Stadium
- Location: Quetta; Pakistan
- Coordinates: 30.191631690877813°N 67.01923142667839°E
- Capacity: 5,000
- Surface: Grass

Sadiq Shaheed Stadium is a football arena in Quetta, in the Balochistan province of Pakistan. IT has hosted domestic football matches and political rallies in the past.

In 2011, Pakistan Premier League fixtures played here regularly attracted around 5,000 spectators.

A number of terrorism incidents have occurred at or near this arena, including a bomb explosion that injured a passerby in 2012. A suicide attack targeting JUI-F chief Fazal-ur-Rehman as he left the stadium resulted in at least one person being killed and 22 others injured. The politician remained unharmed.

Marking the 42nd death remembrance anniversary of the Pashtunkhwa Milli Awami Party leader Mahmood Khan Achakzai's father, Abdul Samad Khan Achakzai, a gathering was held at Sadiq Shaheed Stadium.

== See also ==
- List of football stadiums in Pakistan
