= Korangi Baloch Stadium =

Football stadium in Karachi, Pakistan

- Interactive map of Korangi Baloch Stadium
- Location: Sharafi Goth, Karachi, Pakistan
- Coordinates: 24.852845°N 67.166722°E
- Capacity: 5,000
- Surface: Grass

Korangi Baloch Stadium is an association football stadium in Sharafi Goth, Karachi, Pakistan. It has hosted top-flight Pakistan Premier League fixtures and numerous Karachi-level tournaments. It serves as home ground for Korangi Baloch Football Club, and also for several Karachi-based departmental sides.

== See also ==
- List of football stadiums in Pakistan
