= National Challenge Cup (Pakistan) =

Annual club football tournament in Pakistan

- Organiser(s): Pakistan Football Federation
- Founded: 1979; 47 years ago
- Region: Pakistan
- Teams: 12
- Related competitions: National Football Championship
- Current champions: WAPDA (3rd title)
- Most championships: Khan Research Laboratories (6 titles)
- 2026 National Challenge Cup

The National Challenge Cup is an annual knockout football competition in men's domestic Pakistani football within the Pakistan football league system. It is organized by and named after the Pakistan Football Federation. Initially named as Inter Departmental Championship, it was introduced in 1979 as a football tournament for departmental selections and armed forces teams excluded from the National Football Championship of Pakistan.

Khan Research Laboratories have won the most titles (six). WAPDA are the current champions, winning the 2026 edition.

== Background ==
=== Inter-Departmental Championship (1979) ===
The Inter-Departmental Championship was introduced in 1979 to offer nationwide competition to departmental selections and armed forces teams excluded from the National Football Championship.

=== Inter-Provincial Championship (1984–1985) ===
Due to internal conflicts within the PFF, the second and third editions occurred in 1984 and 1985, rebranded as the Inter Provincial Championship. Although provincial teams were allowed to participate, they were reportedly not factored into the final ranking in both the 1984 and 1985 tournaments. The winners of both editions, Pakistan Airlines in 1984, and Habib Bank Limited in 1985 were given a slot in the Asian Champion Club Tournament, marking Pakistan domestic teams debut in Asian club competitions. Later on, the winners of the National Football Championship, a separate tournament, represented Pakistan in Asian competitions.

=== Frequent changes (1987–1994) ===
In the 1980s and early 1990s, the tournament was held irregularly, undergoing frequent name changes. (Note: RSSSF records possibly conflate tournaments: the 1987 edition may have been part of the National Football Championship, while the 1992, 1993, and 1994 editions likely corresponded to the National B-Division Football Championship, which at the time functioned as the second tier of the league system under promotion and relegation. "Pakistan - List of Champions". www.rsssf.org.)

=== President PFF Cup (1996–2003) ===
From 1996, the President's PFF Cup succeeded the earlier National Departmental Championship as the country's principal departments-only knockout tournament, ran in parallel from the National Football Championship which featured provinces and departments, and served as the second most important national football tournament after the National Championship. It was contested annually at single host cities, with group phases leading into knockouts.

=== National Challenge Cup (2005–present) ===
The Pakistan Football Federation under new elected body headed by president Faisal Saleh Hayat abolished the President's PFF Cup along with the National Football Championship in 2004, to a national league. In 2005 the federation launched the National Challenge Cup, often promoted in contemporary reports as an inaugural tournament, although it effectively represented a rebranded continuation of the earlier President’s PFF Cup. The competition continued the departments-only format of the former President PFF Cup, with some exceptions. In 2005, the restructured Challenge Cup briefly admitted club sides in the preliminary stage before the seeded departments entered later rounds. In 2020, under the FIFA-appointed PFF Normalisation Committee, the field was enlarged to 28 teams and for the first time in over a decade included both departments and private clubs, in an effort to revive competition during administrative suspension and the COVID-19 pandemic.

Since then, it has been branded as National Challenge Cup, with the exception of the 2016 PFF Cup, organised by the Lahore High Court appointed PFF administrator Justice Asad Munir. The National Challenge Cup scheduled for April 2016 was later called off due to lack of sponsorship, leaving the PFF Cup as the only national knockout event that year. In 2017, with the Pakistan Football Federation still paralysed by internal disputes and official competitions suspended, National Bank of Pakistan organised the 2017 NBP President’s Cup, although not recognised as an official Pakistan cup competition, it functioned as a substitute competition during the hiatus.

== Finals ==
Year	Champion	Score	Runner-up	Final Venue
Inter-Departmental Championship
1979	Sindh Government Press		Muslim Commercial Bank	Sukkur
Inter-Provincial Championship
1984	Pakistan Airlines	2–1	Balochistan	Quetta
1985	Habib Bank Limited	0–0 (a.e.t., 4–3 pen)	Punjab	Faisalabad
President PFF Cup
1987	Crescent Textile Mills		Karachi Port Trust	Quetta
National Departmental Championship
1990	Karachi Port Trust		House Building Finance Corporation	Karachi
1991	Markers Club		Karachi Port Trust	Quetta
President PFF Cup
1996	Allied Bank Limited	3–1	Pakistan Army	Quetta
1998	Allied Bank Limited	1–0	Karachi Port Trust	KMC Stadium, Karachi
1999	Allied Bank Limited	1–1 (a.e.t., 5–4 pen)	Khan Research Laboratories	Government High School, Chaman
2000	Pakistan Army	1–0	Allied Bank Limited	Peshawar
2001	Pakistan Army		Khan Research Laboratories	Bahawalpur
2002	Allied Bank Limited	1–1 (a.e.t., 4–2 pen)	WAPDA	People Football Stadium, Karachi
2003	PTCL	1–1	Karachi Port Trust	Sadiq Shaheed Ground, Quetta
National Challenge Cup
2005	PTCL	2–1	WAPDA	Army Sports Complex, Rawalpindi
2008	Pakistan Navy	3–1	Khan Research Laboratories	People's Football Stadium, Karachi
2009	Khan Research Laboratories	1–0	Pakistan Airlines	Hyderabad
2010	Khan Research Laboratories	4–0	Pakistan Navy	Qilla Kuhna Qasim Bagh, Multan
2011	Khan Research Laboratories	1–0	K-Electric	Bohranwali Ground, Faisalabad
2012	Khan Research Laboratories	0–0 (a.e.t., 3–1 pen)	K-Electric	KPT Stadium, Karachi
2013	National Bank	1–0	K-Electric	Dring Stadium, Bahawalpur
2014	Pakistan Air Force	3–1 (a.e.t)	K-Electric	KPT Stadium, Karachi
2015	Khan Research Laboratories	3–0	Pakistan Airlines	Railway Stadium, Lahore
PFF Cup
2016	Khan Research Laboratories	1–0	National Bank	Punjab Stadium, Lahore
National Challenge Cup
2018	Pakistan Air Force	2–1	WAPDA	KPT Stadium, Karachi
2019	Pakistan Army	3–2	Sui Southern Gas	Tehmas Khan Football Stadium, Peshawar
2020	WAPDA	1–0	Sui Southern Gas	Punjab Stadium, Lahore
2023–24	WAPDA	1–0	SA Gardens	Jinnah Stadium, Islamabad
2026	WAPDA	1–0	Khan Research Laboratories	KPT Stadium, Karachi

Wins by club

Club	Wins	Winning years
Khan Research Laboratories	6	2009, 2010, 2011, 2012, 2015, 2016
Allied Bank Limited	4	1996, 1998, 1999, 2002
Pakistan Army	3	2000, 2001, 2019
WAPDA	3	2020, 2023–24, 2026
Crescent Textile Mills	2	1987, 1992
National Bank	2	1993, 2013
Pakistan Airforce	2	2014, 2018
PTCL	2	2003, 2005
Frontier Constabulary	1	1994
Habib Bank	1	1985
Karachi Port Trust	1	1987
Marker Club	1	1991
Pakistan Navy	1	2008
Pakistan Airlines	1	1984
Sindh Government Press	1	1979

=== Results by team ===
Since its establishment, the National Challenge Cup has been won by 15 different teams. Teams shown in italics are no longer in existence.

Results by team
Club	Wins	First final won	Last final won	Runners-up	Last final lost	Total final appearances
Khan Research Laboratories	6	2009	2016	4	2008	11
Allied Bank Limited	4	1996	2002	1	2000	5
Pakistan Army	3	2000	2019	1	1996	4
WAPDA	3	2020	2026	4	2018	7
National Bank	2	1993	2013	2	2016	4
Pakistan Air Force	2	2014	2018	1	2010	3
Crescent Textile Mills	2	1987	1992	0	–	2
PTCL	2	2003	2005	0	–	2
Karachi Port Trust	1	1987	1987	3	2003	4
Habib Bank	1	1985	1985	0	–	2
Marker Club	1	1991	1991	1	1992	2
Pakistan Airlines	1	1984	1984	1	2015	3
Pakistan Navy	1	2008	2008	1	2010	2
Frontier Constabulary	1	1994	1994	0	–	1
Sindh Government Press	1	1979	1979	0	–	1
K-Electric	0	–	–	4	2014	4
Sui Southern Gas	0	–	–	2	2020	2
Muslim Commercial Bank	0	–	–	1	1979	1
Pakistan Steel	0	–	–	1	1993	1
SA Gardens	0	–	–	1	2023–24	1
House Building Finance Corporation	0	–	–	1	1990	1

== Giant killings ==
In 2009, non-league side Sindh Government Press defeated top-flight National Bank by 3–2 in group stages. In 2011, second-division club Ashraf Sugar Mills defeated Pakistan Premier League winners WAPDA F.C. by 1–0, and they repeated the feat again in the group stages, defeating National Bank from Pakistan Premier League by 2–0, as they finished top of the group. In 2012, second-division side Pakistan Public Work Department defeated Pakistan Air Force by 2–0 in group stages. In 2013, Pak Afghan Clearing defeated league winners and defending champions Khan Research Laboratories by 2–1. At the 2023–24 PFF National Challenge Cup, Higher Education Commission, an ad-hoc team of players from different universities and colleges around Pakistan defeated Khan Research Laboratories at the quarterfinals by 1–0 at the stoppage time.

== Records and statistics ==
=== Final ===
- Most wins: 6, Khan Research Laboratories (2009, 2010, 2011, 2012, 2015, 2016)
- Most consecutive wins: 4, Khan Research Laboratories (2009, 2010, 2011, 2012)
- Most consecutive/uninterrupted years as National Challenge Cup Champions: 6, Sindh Government Press (1979–1984)
- Most appearances without winning: 4, K-Electric (2011, 2012, 2013, 2014)
- Most appearances without losing: 4, Khan Research Laboratories (2009, 2010, 2011, 2012)
- Most appearances without losing (streak): 4, Khan Research Laboratories (2009, 2010, 2011, 2012)
- Longest gap between wins: 20 years, National Bank (1993–2013)
- Biggest win: 4 goals, Khan Research Laboratories 4–0 Pakistan Navy (2010)
- Most goals in a final: 4, joint record:
  - Allied Bank Limited 3–1 Pakistan Army (1996)
  - Pakistan Navy 3–1 Khan Research Laboratories (2008)
  - Khan Research Laboratories 4–0 Pakistan Navy (2010)
  - Pakistan Air Force 3–1 K-Electric (2014)
- Most defeats: 4, joint record:
  - K-Electric (2011, 2012, 2013, 2014)
  - WAPDA F.C. (1984, 2002, 2005, 2018)

==== Individual ====
- Most wins by manager: 4, Tariq Lutfi (Khan Research Laboratories) (2011, 2012, 2015, 2016),
- Most goals (one final): 2, joint record:
  - Sajjad Ahmed (Pakistan Navy) (2008)
  - Izharullah Khan (Khan Research Laboratories) (2015)
- Most finals scored in: 2, joint record:
  - Haroon Yousaf (Allied Bank Limited) (1 each in 1996 & 1998)
  - Muhammad Mujahid (Pakistan Air Force) (1 each in 2014 & 2018)
- Most goals scored: 23, Muhammad Rasool

=== All rounds ===
- Biggest win: City Football Club 2–18 Wohaib (2005)
- Biggest away win: City Football Club 2–18 Wohaib (2005)
- Most clubs competing for trophy in a season: 28 (2020)
- Longest penalty shootout: 5 penalties each, Allied Bank Limited v. Khan Research Laboratories (1999; Allied Bank Limited won 5–4)
- Most rounds played in a season: 3, for:
  - Bhatti United (2016: Qualifying Round – Knockout stages, 1st–3rd Rounds)
  - Karachi United (2016: Qualifying Round – Knockout stages, 1st–3rd Rounds)
  - Sui Southern Gas (2016: Qualifying Round – Knockout stages, 1st–3rd Rounds)
- Most games played in a season: 7, Karachi United (2016: three matches Qualifying Group stages, three Proper Group stages, one Quarter-finals)
- Fastest goal: 37 seconds, Ahmed Faheem (for WAPDA v. Saif Textile, Group Stages, 2 February 2023)
- Most consecutive games without defeat: 25, Khan Research Laboratories (Group Stages, 2010 through Group stage, 2013. Won three National Challenge Cup.)
- Most consecutive games without defeat: 25, Khan Research Laboratories (Group Stages, 2010 through Group stage, 2013. Won three National Challenge Cup.)
- Fastest hat-trick: 5 minutes, Umair Ali (for Higher Education Commission v. DFA Bahawalpur, Group Stages, 19 May 2013)
- Most goals by a player in a single National Challenge Cup season: 10, Muhammad Rasool (for K-Electric, 2012.
- Most goals by a player in a single National Challenge Cup game: 6, joint-record:
  - Kaleemullah Khan (for Khan Research Laboratories in 8–0 defeat of Ashraf Sugar Mills, Group Stages, 16 May 2013)
  - Umair Ali (for Higher Education Commission v. DFA Bahawalpur, Group Stages, 19 May 2013)
  - Muhammad Waheed (for Civil Aviation Authority v. Pakistan Railways, Group stage, 22 July 2019)
