= Pakistan Navy F.C. =

Pakistani football club

- Full name: Pakistan Navy Football Club
- Nicknames: The Navy; The Seamen
- Short name: NAV
- Founded: 1948; 78 years ago
- Ground: Naval Sports Complex, Islamabad; Naval Sports Complex, Karachi
- Owner: Pakistan Navy
- Chairman: Munawar Hussain
- Manager: Khalid Zuber
Home colours	Away colours

Pakistan Navy Football Team serves as the football section of the Pakistan Navy. The club was founded in 1948. The club used to compete in the National Football Championship and the Pakistan Premier League. The club regularly participates in the National Football Challenge Cup.

== History ==
=== Early years ===
The club was established in 1948 by the Pakistan Navy. It then regularly featured at the National Football Championship of Pakistan.

They reached the final of 1999 National Football Championship, losing 4–3 on penalties to Allied Bank. In 2000 National Football Championship Pakistan Navy reached the semi-finals, although the match was abandoned after Pakistan Navy refused to continue the match after receiving a red card and match was awarded in the favor of their opponents Habib Bank.

In 2002, Pakistan Navy reached the quarter-finals of 2002 President PFF Cup, they were knocked out by Karachi Electric Supply Corporation after losing 1–0. They reached the 2003 National Football Championship, losing to Habib Bank 4–2 on penalties after the match ended 1–1, they also reached the 2003 President PFF Cup semi-finals, where they lost 3–0 to Karachi Port Trust. Pakistan Navy and Pakistan Army competed for "Inter-services Championship" as Pakistan Navy lost 6–1 to Pakistan Army.

=== Pakistan Premier League era (2004–2014) ===
Pakistan Navy were among the founding members of newly formed Pakistan Premier League. They finished 6th in the league in 2004 season. They record some of the biggest victories in the season, defeating Young Eleven and Mardan 8–1 and 10–0 respectively. In the second season, Pakistan Navy survived relegation by one point, ending the season with 21 points.

Pakistan Navy won their first title in 2008, winning the 2008 National Football Challenge Cup, defeating Khan Research Laboratories 3–1 in the final. In the 2009–10 season Pakistan Navy got their highest ever position in Pakistan Premier League, finishing in 4th position with 57 points. They reached the finals of 2010 National Football Challenge Cup, where they lost 4–0 to defending champions Khan Research Laboratories.

In 2011–12 season, the club reached the semi-finals of 2012 KPT Challenge Cup, where they once again lost 1–0 to Khan Research Laboratories. They then lost the third-place match to WAPDA on penalties.

The club got relegated in 2013–14 season, when the Pakistan Football Federation decided to reduce the teams from 16 to 12 for the 2014–15 Pakistan Premier League. Pakistan Navy were the joint-highest placed team in the relegation zone with Habib Bank, sharing 35 points each. Pakistan Navy were knocked out of the group stage in the 2014 National Football Challenge Cup.

=== Second division (2014) ===
After getting relegated in the 2013–14 season, they competed in the second division, 2014 PFF League. Pakistan Navy defeated Falcon Company and Pakistan Steel 2–1 and 3–1 respectively and finished top in their group. In the second phase, they again topped their group after defeating Pakistan Television and Sui Southern Gas 5–0 and 1–0 respectively. Pakistan Navy faced Higher Education Commission in the final of departmental leg, winning 2–1 and earning promotion back to the Pakistan Premier League. They faced Baloch Nushki in the final of the second division, which they won 1–0 and were crowned the champions.

=== Return to top-flight (2015–2019) ===
After winning the 2014 Pakistan Football Federation League, Pakistan Navy were to play in the 2015–16 Pakistan Premier League, but no league was held in the country until the 2018–19. They competed in the National Football Challenge Cup as it was the only top-tier of Pakistani football. They competed in the 2015 and 2016, reaching quarter-finals of the former and were knocked out at the group stage in the latter one. Domestic football returned to Pakistan in 2018–19. Pakistan Navy participated in the 2018 National Challenge Cup, reaching quarter-finals where they lost 2–0 to WAPDA. In 2018–19 Pakistan Premier League, they finished 9th. During the season the club recorded one of the bigges home victories when they defeated Baloch Nushki 6–1.

=== 2023–present ===
Following the domestic football revamp in the country in 2023, departmental clubs including Navy remained competing in the National Football Challenge Cup.

== Stadium ==
The club has two home grounds; the Naval Sports Complex, Islamabad and the Karsaz-based Naval Sports Complex, Karachi.

== Honours ==
- Football Federation League
  - Champions (1): 2014–15
- National Football Challenge Cup
  - Winners (1): 2008
