= National Bank of Pakistan FC =

Pakistani football club

National Bank
- Full name: National Bank of Pakistan Football Club
- Nickname: The Bankers
- Short name: NBP
- Founded: 1966
- Dissolved: 2021; 5 years ago
- Ground: Korangi Baloch Stadium; Aga Khan Gymkhana Ground
- Capacity: 5,000
- Owner: National Bank of Pakistan
colours	colours

National Bank of Pakistan Football Club, commonly known as National Bank or NBP FC, served as the football section of National Bank of Pakistan until its dissolution in 2021. Based in Karachi, Sindh, the club used to compete in the top-tier Pakistan Premier League.

== History ==
The National Bank football team was founded by National Bank of Pakistan, one of Pakistan's largest banks, in 1966 when the bank created a formal sports setup and began fielding departmental teams in national sports competitions including football.

The club has won the second-tier National B-Division Football Championship in 1993, and the Football Federation League in 2004. They have also won National Football Challenge Cup in 2013.

=== Disbandment ===
National Bank was one of the teams which withdrew from the 2021–22 Pakistan Premier League, citing that the majority of their players had already passed their prime. The club was dissolved after the shutdown of departmental sports in Pakistan in September 2021.

== Rivalry ==
National Bank and Habib Bank developed a noted rivalry often referred to as the "Bank derby." In August 2008, Habib Bank recorded their first ever Pakistan Premier League win against National Bank in 2008.

== Stadium ==
Like several Pakistan domestic football teams, National Bank did not own a dedicated ground. Hence the team used several municipal venues in Karachi for its home fixtures. The club usually used Korangi Baloch Stadium in Sharafi Goth for its home fixtures for the Pakistan Premier League. In the 2012–13 Pakistan Premier League, the team used Aga Khan Gymkhana Ground in Karachi.

== Honours ==
Domestic

- Pakistan National Football Challenge Cup
  - Winners: 2013
- National B-Division Football Championship
  - Winners: 1993
- Football Federation League
  - Winners: 2004
