= Habib Bank Limited FC =

Pakistani football club

Habib Bank
- Full name: Habib Bank Limited Football Club
- Nickname: The Bankers
- Short name: HBL
- Founded: 1975; 51 years ago
- Dissolved: 2015; 11 years ago
- Stadium: People's Football Stadium, Karachi
- Capacity: 40,000
- Owner: Habib Bank Limited
Home colours	Away colours

Habib Bank Limited Football Club, abbreviated as HBL, served as the football section of Habib Bank Limited. Based in Karachi, Sindh, the club competed in the National Football Championship and Pakistan Premier League.

== History ==
=== Early years (1970s) ===
The Habib Bank Limited football team was founded by Habib Bank Limited, one of Pakistan's largest banks, in 1975 when the bank created a formal sports setup and began fielding departmental teams in national sports competitions including football.

=== Rise and national titles (1980s) ===
In the 1982 National Football Championship, the team won its first national title after defeating Pakistan Railways in the final.

The next year, the team finished runner-ups after falling against WAPDA in the final.

=== Continental debut (1986–87 Asian Club Championship) ===
The team notably participated at the 1986 Asian Club Championship after winning the 1985 Inter-Provincial Championship final against Punjab. At the Asian top tier, with former Pakistan international Moosa Ghazi as coach, the team was drawn in Group 4 held in Colombo as venue. The team recorded a 0–7 loss against Malavan (Iran), 1–2 loss against Saunders (Sri Lanka), and drew 2–2 against Victory (Maldives). This was the second continental appearance for a Pakistani club side.

After the finalisation of the 1986 Quaid-e-Azam International Tournament, Habib Bank was also chosen to play two exhibition matches against China in 4 May and against Sri Lanka in 5 May at the Ibn-e-Qasim Bagh Stadium in Multan. The team drew by 1–1 in their match against Sri Lanka.

=== Perennial contenders (1990s–2000) ===
Habib Bank remained competitive through frequent restructures of the National Football Championship, finishing runners-up in 1991 and again runners-up in 2000.

=== Pakistan Premier League era (2004–2015) ===
They were one of the founding members of the Pakistan Premier League in the inaugural 2004 season. They were relegated in the 2006–07 season, but were elected to return, alongside Pakistan Airlines, following expansion of the Pakistan Premier League to 14 clubs.

=== Disbandment ===
The team was disbanded by the parental organisation in December 2015.

== Stadium ==
Like several Pakistan domestic football teams, Habib Bank did not own a dedicated ground. Hence the team used several municipal venues in Karachi for its home fixtures. The club usually used People's Football Stadium for its home fixtures for the Pakistan Premier League.

== Rivalry ==
Habib Bank and National Bank developed a noted rivalry often referred to as the "Bank derby." In August 2008, Habib Bank recorded their first ever Pakistan Premier League win against National Bank in 2008.

== Performance in AFC competitions ==
Win Draw Loss

Season	Competition	Round	Club	First leg	Second leg	Aggregate
1986–87	Asian Club Championship	Qualifying Stage	(Iran) Malavan	0–7		
1986–87	Asian Club Championship	Qualifying Stage	(Sri Lanka) Saunders SC	1–2		
1986–87	Asian Club Championship	Qualifying Stage	(Maldives) Victory SC	2–2		

== Honours ==
- National Football Championship:
  - Champions (1): 1982
- Inter-Provincial Championship
  - Winners (1): 1985
