= K-Electric FC =

Pakistani football club

- Full name: K-Electric Football Club
- Nickname: The Electricians
- Founded: 1974
- Dissolved: 2020; 6 years ago
- Ground: People's Football Stadium
- Capacity: 40,000
- Owner: K-Electric
Home colours	Away colours

K-Electric Football Club, previously known as KESC, served as the football section of K-Electric. The club played in the Pakistan Premier League and was based in Karachi, Sindh. The club colors, reflected in their crest and kit, were blue and orange.

== History ==
K-Electric football team began as Karachi Electric Supply Corporation (KESC), a departmental side founded by the parental department KESC. In 1962, they played at the Karachi Football League held at Polo Ground.

=== Pakistan Premier League era (2005–2020) ===
K-Electric won promotion in 2005 from the second tier Pakistan Football Federation League when they finished runners-up to Pakistan Railways.

Across the early 2010s KESC reached multiple National Football Challenge Cup finals but falling short in 2011, 2012, 2013, and 2014. They also finished runner-ups of the Pakistan Premier League in 2012–13, and 2013–14 seasons. In November 2013, the team purchased its first foreign player, Nigerian Abayomi Oludeyi.

In January 2014, after a company-wide rebrand, KESC became K-Electric Limited and the football team followed suit.

==== Domestic success (2014–2015) ====
In October 2014, the team purchased another Nigerian player, Abayomi Wilson. The club subsequently won their first league title in the 2014–15 season, having finished as runners-up in the two previous seasons. They became the first club from Pakistan to qualify for AFC Cup. Ahead of Asia in July 2015, the team hired foreign based UEFA "A" coach Majid Shafiq and added England-based players Shani Abbasi and Irfan Khan.

In August 2015, K-Electric F.C. made history by becoming the first Pakistan football club to progress into the AFC Cup play-offs after overcoming the champions of Bhutan and Mongolia. They drew 3–3 with Druk United before beating Khoromkhon 1–0. The team also acquired the services of English striker Jon Ashworth. In October 2015, K-Electric F.C. competed in the Sheikh Kamal International Club Cup in Bangladesh. Their striker Muhammad Rasool scored 4 goals in 3 games.

In the play-offs of the AFC Cup in February 2016, K-Electric lost 2–0 to Al-Hidd from Bahrain. Months later, the AFC Disciplinary Committee ruled that K-Electric had fielded an ineligible player, English player Irfan Khan, in the qualifying group stage matches, and the two results versus Druk United and Khoromkhon were forfeited and awarded as 3–0 wins to the opponents. Despite the forfeitures and a fine, the club was not removed from the playoff fixture, and the previous fixtures remained as played.

==== Later years and dissolution ====
The team returned for the 2018–19 Pakistan Premier League season after years of federation turmoil and football inactivity, but results were inconsistent.

In October 2020 K-Electric disbanded the football team, due to corporate self-interest and the financial burden of maintaining a squad during a period of national football inactivity.

== Team image ==
=== Franchise football ===
In the second edition of the national franchise based Super Football League in 2010, KESC ran the Karachi Energy team. The 2010 revival of the competition after years from the last edition held in 2007 itself was staged in partnership with KESC.

=== Community work ===
Beyond first team football, K-Electric ran grassroots programs, the K-Electric Lyari U-16 Football League between 2014 and 2016, with UNICEF, Pakistan Football Federation, Anti-Narcotics and later Rangers/I Am Karachi as partners, and sponsoring a women's club, Baloch United in 2014.

== Stadium ==
Like several Pakistan domestic football teams, K-Electric did not own a dedicated ground. Hence the team used several municipal venues in Karachi for its home fixtures. The club usually used People's Football Stadium in Lyari for its home fixtures for the Pakistan Premier League. It also chose as their home venue for the 2016 AFC Cup. The club also staged youth tournaments, such as the K-Electric Lyari U-16 League, at the stadium.

== Rivalry ==
The club had a long-standing rivalry with Rawalpindi-based Khan Research Laboratories. The rivalry started when K-Electric and Khan Research Laboratories faced off in two back-to-back Pakistan National Challenge Cup finals, in 2011 and 2012, with Khan Research Laboratories winning both the finals 1–0 and 3–1 on penalties with game drawn 0–0 after extra time respectively. K-Electric won the league in the 2014-15 season, ending the reign of Khan Research Laboratories as domestic champions.

== Continental history ==
Win Draw Loss

Season	Competition	Round	Club	Home	Away	Aggregate
2016	AFC Cup	Qualifying round	(Bhutan) Druk United	3–3		
2016	AFC Cup	Qualifying round	(Mongolia) Khoromkhon	1–0		
2016	AFC Cup	Qualifying play-off	(Bahrain) Al-Hidd	0–2		

== Honours ==
=== Domestic ===
- Pakistan Premier League:
  - Winners (1): 2014–15
  - Runners-up (2): 2012–13, 2013–14
- Pakistan Football Federation League:
  - Runners-up (1): 2005–06
- Pakistan National Football Challenge Cup:
  - Runners-up (4): 2011, 2012, 2013, 2014
