= List of Pakistan football champions =

The Pakistan football champions are the winners of the highest league in Pakistani football, which is currently the Pakistan Premier League.

Pakistan’s first football tournament began on May 28, 1948 as the National Football Championship, a knock-out competition, which remained as the top football competition in the country until 2004 with the introduction of the Pakistan Premier League. In 1979, a domestic cup was added to Pakistani football, known as the National Challenge Cup.

The 1948 National Football Championship was the first season and ended with Sindh Red being crowned champions. The National Football Championship era though saw Karachi based Pakistan Airlines with most championships, winning the competition nine times. The Pakistan Premier League has been dominated by Khan Research Laboratories from Rawalpindi winning the league five times.

Currently, the team with the most championships in Pakistan Premier League is Khan Research Laboratories, who have won five championships in the league. However, Pakistan Airlines are the team with the most championships overall, winning National Football Championship nine times.

== Champions ==
- **Bold** indicates double winners – i.e. League and Domestic (National Challenge) Cup.
- **Italic** indicates team winning the season unbeaten – i.e. (invincible).
- Note: Various provinces (Sindh, NWFP, Balochistan, Punjab, East Pakistan), divisions (Karachi, Peshawar) or other clubs (Railways) entered teams under various names; all finalists listed can nevertheless be regarded as the 'first' team of the respective clubs with the exception of the 1948 losing finalists, Sindh Blue, who were the second-string team of Sindh.

=== National Football Championship (1948–2003) ===
| Year | Champions (number of titles) | Runners-up |
|---|---|---|
| 1948 | Sindh Red (1) | Sindh Blue |
| 1950 | Balochistan Red (1) | Sindh |
| 1952 | Punjab (1) | NWFP |
| 1953 | Punjab (2) | NWFP Blue |
| 1954 | Punjab Blue (3) | Pakistan Railways |
| 1955 | Punjab (4) | NWFP |
| 1956 | Balochistan (2) | Railways White |
| 1957 | Punjab (5) | East Pakistan White |
| 1958 | Punjab Blue (6) | Pakistan Railways |
| 1959 | Balochistan (3) | East Pakistan |
| 1960 | East Pakistan (1) | Karachi White |
| 1961–62 | Dacca Division (1) | Karachi Blue |
| 1962 | Dacca Division (2) | Karachi Division |
| 1963 | Karachi Division (1) | Pakistan Railways |
| 1964–65 | Karachi Division (2) | Pakistan Railways |
| 1966 | Karachi Division (3) | Pakistan Railways |
| 1968 | Peshawar Division (1) | Lahore Division |
| 1969 | Pakistan Railways (1) | Karachi Division |
| 1969–70 | Chittagong Division (1) | Peshawar Division |
| 1971 | Pakistan Airlines (1) | Karachi Division |
| 1972 | Pakistan Airlines (2) | Peshawar White |
| 1973 | Karachi Yellow (4) | Rawalpindi Division |
| 1975 (I) | Pakistan Airlines (3) | Punjab A |
| 1975 (II) | Sindh Red (2) | Balochistan Red |
| 1976 | Pakistan Airlines (4) | Pakistan Railways |
| 1978 | Pakistan Airlines (5) | Sindh Red |
| 1979 | Karachi Red (5) | Pakistan Airlines |
| 1980 | Karachi Red (6) | Pakistan Army |
| 1981 | Pakistan Airlines (6) | Pakistan Air Force |
| 1982 | Habib Bank (1) | Pakistan Railways |
| 1983 | WAPDA (1) | Habib Bank |
| 1984 | Pakistan Railways (2) | WAPDA |
| 1985 | Quetta Division (1) | Pakistan Airlines |
| 1986 | Pakistan Air Force (1) | Pakistan Airlines |
| 1987 | **Crescent Textile Mills** (1) | Karachi Port Trust |
| 1989 (I) | Punjab Red (7) | Pakistan Railways |
| 1989 (II) | Pakistan Airlines (7) | Sindh Government Press |
| 1990 | Punjab Red (8) | Pakistan Airlines |
| 1991 | WAPDA (2) | Habib Bank |
| 1992–93 | Pakistan Airlines (8) | Pakistan Army |
| 1993–94 | Pakistan Army (1) | WAPDA |
| 1994 | Crescent Textile Mills (2) | WAPDA |
| 1995 | Pakistan Army (2) | Allied Bank |
| 1997 (I) | Allied Bank (1) | Pakistan Airlines |
| 1997 (II) | Pakistan Airlines (9) | Allied Bank |
| 1999 | **Allied Bank (2)** | Pakistan Navy |
| 2000 | Allied Bank (3) | Habib Bank |
| 2001 | WAPDA (3) | Khan Research Laboratories |
| 2003 | WAPDA (4) | Pakistan Army |

=== Pakistan Premier League (2004-present) ===
| Year | Champions (number of titles) | Points | Runners-up | Points | Third place | Points | Top goalscorer | Goals |
|---|---|---|---|---|---|---|---|---|
| 2004 | WAPDA (1) | 74 | Pakistan Army | 74 | Khan Research Laboratories | 73 | (Pakistan) Arif Mehmood (WAPDA) | 20 |
| 2005 | Pakistan Army (1) | 51 | WAPDA | 45 | Khan Research Laboratories | 41 | Imran Hussain (Pakistan Army) | 21 |
| 2006–07 | Pakistan Army (2) | 49 | WAPDA (2) | 44 | Khan Research Laboratories | 44 | (Pakistan) Arif Mehmood (WAPDA) | 20 |
| 2007–08 | WAPDA (2) | 58 | Pakistan Army | 57 | Khan Research Laboratories | 53 | (Pakistan) Arif Mehmood (WAPDA) | 21 |
| 2008 | WAPDA (3) | 54 | Pakistan Army | 50 | Khan Research Laboratories | 47 | (Pakistan) Muhammad Rasool (Khan Research Laboratories) | 22 |
| 2009 | **Khan Research Laboratories** (1) | 60 | Pakistan Army | 60 | WAPDA | 57 | (Pakistan) Arif Mehmood (WAPDA) | 20 |
| 2010 | WAPDA (4) | 67 | Khan Research Laboratories | 58 | PIA | 57 | (Pakistan) Arif Mehmood (WAPDA) | 21 |
| 2011 | **Khan Research Laboratories** (2) | 77 | Afghan | 57 | Pakistan Army | 57 | (Pakistan) Jadid Khan Pathan (Afghan Chaman) | 22 |
| 2012–13 | Khan Research Laboratories (3) | 71 | K-Electric | 62 | Muslim | 62 | (Pakistan) Kaleemullah Khan (Khan Research Laboratories) | 35 |
| 2013–14 | Khan Research Laboratories (4) | 66 | K-Electric | 64 | WAPDA | 63 | (Pakistan) Kaleemullah Khan (Khan Research Laboratories) | 18 |
| 2014–15 | K-Electric (1) | 48 | Pakistan Army | 45 | Air Force | 42 | (Pakistan) Muhammad Rasool (K-Electric) | 22 |
| 2018–19 | Khan Research Laboratories (5) | 51 | Air Force | 51 | Sui Southern Gas | 50 | Ansar Abbas (Pakistan Army) | 15 |

== Total titles won ==
Teams in bold competed in the Premier League as of the 2018–19 season.

| Club | Winners | Runners-up | Winning seasons |
|---|---|---|---|
| **Pakistan Airlines**^{1}† | 9 | 5 | 1971, 1972, 1975, 1976, 1978, 1981, 1989, 1992–93, 1997 |
| **WAPDA** | 8 | 5 | 1983, 1991, 2001, 2003, 2004-05, 2007–08, 2008–09, 2010–11 |
| Punjab^{2} | 8 | 1 | 1952, 1953, 1954, 1955, 1957, 1958, 1989, 1990 |
| Karachi Division^{3} | 6 | 4 | 1963, 1964–65, 1966, 1973, 1979, 1980 |
| **Khan Research Laboratories** | 5 | 2 | 2009–10, 2011–12, 2012–13, 2013–14, 2018–19 |
| **Pakistan Army** | 4 | 8 | 1993–94, 1995, 2005-06, 2006–07 |
| Allied Bank† | 3 | 2 | 1997, 1999, 2000 |
| Balochistan^{4} | 3 | 1 | 1950, 1956, 1959 |
| Pakistan Railways | 2 | 9 | 1969, 1984 |
| Sindh^{5} | 2 | 2 | 1948, 1975 |
| Crescent Textile Mills† | 2 | 0 | 1987, 1994 |
| Dacca Division | 2 | 0 | 1961–62, 1962 |
| Habib Bank† | 1 | 3 | 1982 |
| **Pakistan Air Force** | 1 | 3 | 1986 |
| **K-Electric**† | 1 | 2 | 2014–15 |
| East Pakistan | 1 | 2 | 1960 |
| Peshawar Division | 1 | 1 | 1968 |
| Chittagong Division | 1 | 0 | 1969–70 |
| Quetta Division | 1 | 0 | 1985 |
| NWFP | 0 | 3 | |
| **Afghan Chaman** | 0 | 1 | |
| **Karachi Port Trust** | 0 | 1 | |
| Lahore Division | 0 | 1 | |
| **Pakistan Navy** | 0 | 1 | |
| Sindh Government Press | 0 | 1 | |
| Sindh Blue | 0 | 1 | |
| Karachi | 0 | 1 | |

Note: † represents dissolved teams.

== Total titles won by provinces ==
Punjab has dominated the football league in Pakistan with a total of 31 league titles won between three cities; Faisalabad, Lahore and Rawalpindi. Sindh based Karachi and East Bengal based Dacca dominated the league from 1960 to 1965; Dacca winning consecutive titles from 1960-61 and 1961-62, and Karachi winning back to back three titles from 1962-63, 1963-64 and 1964-65.

| Province | Number of titles | Clubs |
|---|---|---|
| Punjab | 32 | WAPDA (8), Punjab (8), Khan Research Laboratories (5), Pakistan Army (4), Allied Bank (3), Pakistan Railways (2), Crescent Textile Mills (2) |
| Sindh | 19 | Pakistan Airlines (9), Karachi Division (6), Sindh (2), Habib Bank (1), K-Electric (1) |
| Balochistan | 4 | Balochistan (3), Quetta Division (1) |
| East Bengal (now Bangladesh) | 3 | Dacca Division (2), Chittagong Division (1) |
| Khyber Pakhtunkhwa (formerly NWFP) | 2 | Pakistan Air Force (1), Peshawar Division (1) |

=== By City / Town ===
| City / Town | Championships | Clubs |
|---|---|---|
| Lahore | 21 | WAPDA (8), Punjab (8), Allied Bank (3), Pakistan Railways (2) |
| Karachi | 19 | Pakistan Airlines (9), Karachi Division (6), Sindh (2), Habib Bank (1), K-Electric (1) |
| Rawalpindi | 9 | Khan Research Laboratories (5), Pakistan Army (4) |
| Quetta | 4 | Balochistan (3), Quetta Division (1) |
| Peshawar | 2 | Pakistan Air Force (1), Peshawar Division (1) |
| Dhaka | 2 | Dacca Division (2) |
| Faisalabad | 2 | Crescent Textile Mills (2) |
| Chittagong | 1 | Chittagong Division (1) |

== Multiple trophy wins ==
Only three clubs have won double in Pakistan football.

| Team | Season | Trophies |
|---|---|---|
| Allied Bank | 1999 | National Football Championship, President PFF Cup |
| Crescent Textile Mills | 1987 | National Football Championship, President PFF Cup |
| Khan Research Laboratories | 2009–10 | Pakistan Premier League, National Football Challenge Cup |
| Khan Research Laboratories | 2011–12 | Pakistan Premier League, National Football Challenge Cup |
