= 2000 National Football Championship (Pakistan) =

Tournament details
- Country: Pakistan
- Venue(s): People's Sports Complex, Karachi
- Dates: 23 July 2000 – 13 August 2000
- Teams: 24

Final positions
- Champions: Allied Bank
- Runners-up: Habib Bank

Tournament statistics
- Matches played: 39
- Goals scored: 106 (2.72 per match)
- Top goal scorer(s): (Pakistan) Gohar Zaman (Allied Bank) (7 goals)

The 2000 National Football Championship was the 47th edition of the National Football Championship, played at the People's Sports Complex, Karachi from 23 July to 13 August.

== Group stage ==
=== Pool A ===
Pos	Team	Pld	W	D	L	GF	GA	GD	Pts	Qualification
1	Allied Bank	2	2	0	0	8	1	+7	6	Qualified for knockout stage
2	Police	2	1	0	1	3	4	−1	3	Qualified for knockout stage
3	Punjab Reds	2	0	0	2	3	9	−6	0	

Source: RSSSF
26 July 2000

Allied Bank	6–1	Police
Talib Hassan 19'; Muhammad Ejaz 28'; Bakhsh 57' 73'; Zaman 64' 84'	Report	Naseebullah 85'

31 July 2000

Allied Bank	2–0	Punjab Reds
Bakhsh 74'; Zakariya	Report

2 August 2000

Police	3–2	Punjab Reds
	Report

=== Pool B ===
Pos	Team	Pld	W	D	L	GF	GA	GD	Pts	Qualification
1	National Bank	2	2	0	0	2	0	+2	6	Qualified for knockout stage
2	Sindh Reds	2	1	0	1	3	1	+2	3	Qualified for knockout stage
3	University Grants Commission	2	0	0	2	0	4	−4	0	

Source: RSSSF
24 July 2000

Sindh Reds	3–0	University Grants Commission
	Report

26 July 2000

National Bank	1–0	University Grants Commission
Abdul Sattar 24'	Report

3 August 2000

National Bank	1–0	Sindh Reds
Abdul Razzaq 15'	Report

=== Pool C ===
Pos	Team	Pld	W	D	L	GF	GA	GD	Pts	Qualification
1	Pakistan Army	2	2	0	0	8	1	+7	6	Qualified for knockout stage
2	Sui Southern Gas	2	1	0	1	2	6	−4	3	Qualified for knockout stage
3	Balochistan Greens	2	0	0	2	2	5	−3	0	

Source: RSSSF
30 July 2000

Pakistan Army	5–0	Sui Southern Gas
Mahmood; Ghulam Ali; Nadeem Gill 44'; Jaffar Izar; Jamil Gill 80'	Report

1 August 2000

Sui Southern Gas	2–1	Balochistan Greens
	Report

3 August 2000

Pakistan Army	3–1	Balochistan Greens
Shaukat Ali 16'; Ghulam Ali; Omar	Report	Niamatullah

=== Pool D ===
Pos	Team	Pld	W	D	L	GF	GA	GD	Pts	Qualification
1	Pakistan International Airlines	2	0	2	0	1	1	0	2	Qualified for knockout stage
2	Pakistan Telecommunication	2	1	1	0	5	0	+5	4	Qualified for knockout stage
3	NWFP Greens	2	0	1	1	1	6	−5	1	

Source: RSSSF
24 July 2000

PIA	0–0	Pakistan Telecommunication
	Report

27 July 2000

Pakistan Telecommunication	5–0	NWFP Greens
Imran Farooqi 14' 51'; Tahir Kamarat 70'; Tanvirul Hassan	Report

29 July 2000

PIA	1–1	NWFP Greens
Asif 25'	Report	Akhtar Hussain 5'

=== Pool E ===
Pos	Team	Pld	W	D	L	GF	GA	GD	Pts	Qualification
1	Khan Research Laboratories	2	2	0	0	11	1	+10	6	Qualified for knockout stage
2	WAPDA	2	1	0	1	4	4	0	3	Qualified for knockout stage
3	Punjab Greens	2	0	0	2	2	12	−10	0	

Source: RSSSF
28 July 2000

Khan Research Laboratories	8–1	Punjab Greens
	Report

31 July 2000

WAPDA	4–1	Punjab Greens
Rashid Siddiqi 12'; Butt 21', ?'; Burhan Ali 71'	Report	Mujahid

2 August 2000

Khan Research Laboratories	3–0	WAPDA
	Report

=== Pool F ===
Pos	Team	Pld	W	D	L	GF	GA	GD	Pts	Qualification
1	Habib Bank	2	1	1	0	2	1	+1	4	Qualified for knockout stage
2	Pakistan Railways	2	1	0	1	3	1	+2	3	Qualified for knockout stage
3	Sindh Greens	2	0	1	1	1	4	−3	1	

Source: RSSSF
23 July 2000

Habib Bank	1–1	Sindh Greens
Saleem 19'	Report	Abdul Shakoor 40'

25 July 2000

Pakistan Railways	3–0	Sindh Greens
	Report

28 July 2000

Habib Bank	1–0	Pakistan Railways
	Report

=== Pool G ===
Pos	Team	Pld	W	D	L	GF	GA	GD	Pts	Qualification
1	Pakistan Air Force	2	2	0	0	5	1	+4	6	Qualified for knockout stage
2	Karachi Port Trust	2	1	0	1	3	2	+1	3	Qualified for knockout stage
3	Balochistan Reds	2	0	0	2	0	5	−5	0	

Source: RSSSF
23 July 2000

Pakistan Air Force	2–1	Karachi Port Trust
Maqbool 60'	Report	Naseer Baloch 61'

30 July 2000

Karachi Port Trust	2–0	Balochistan Reds
Mohammad Amin 8'; Arshad 18'	Report

1 August 2000

Pakistan Air Force	3–0	Balochistan Reds
	Report

=== Pool H ===
Pos	Team	Pld	W	D	L	GF	GA	GD	Pts	Qualification
1	Pakistan Navy	2	2	0	0	3	1	+2	6	Qualified for knockout stage
2	NWFP Reds	2	0	1	1	2	3	−1	1	Qualified for knockout stage
3	KMC	2	0	1	1	1	2	−1	1	

Source: RSSSF
25 July 2000

Pakistan Navy	1–0	KMC
	Report

27 July 2000

Pakistan Navy	2–1	NWFP Reds
	Report

29 July 2000

KMC	1–1	NWFP Reds
	Report

== Knockout stage ==
=== Round of 16 ===
4 August 2000

Pakistan Navy	1–0	Pakistan Railways
	Report

4 August 2000

Habib Bank	4–0	NWFP Reds
	Report

5 August 2000

Allied Bank	2–0	Sui Southern Gas
	Report

5 August 2000

WAPDA	2–0	Pakistan Air Force
	Report

6 August 2000

Karachi Port Trust	1–0	Khan Research Laboratories
	Report

6 August 2000

PIA	2–1	National Bank
	Report

7 August 2000

Pakistan Army	3–1	Police
	Report

7 August 2000

Sindh Reds	0–0	Pakistan Telecommunication
	Report
Penalties
	3–2

=== Quarter-finals ===
8 August 2000

Habib Bank	3–1	Karachi Port Trust
Mohammad Bashir 35' 51'; Saleem 71'	Report	Abdul Rauf 25'

8 August 2000

Pakistan Navy	2–1 (a.e.t.)	WAPDA
Fida Hussain 17'; M. Basharat 100'	Report	Butt 43'

9 August 2000

Sindh Reds	2–1	Pakistan Army
Mohammad Khan 37'; Gulzar 60'	Report	Babar Mahmood 80'

9 August 2000

Allied Bank	1–0 (a.e.t.)	PIA
Zaman 92'	Report

=== Semi-finals ===
10 August 2000

Pakistan Navy	awd	Habib Bank
	Report

11 August 2000

Allied Bank	2–0	Sindh Reds
Zakariya 79'; Zaman 85'	Report

=== Final ===
13 August 2000

Allied Bank	1–0	Habib Bank
Zaman 43'	Report
