= 1994 National A-Division Football Championship =

National A-Division Football Championship
- Season: 1994
- Dates: 16 April 1994 – 15 May 1994
- Champions: Crescent Textile Mills
- Runner up: WAPDA

The 1994 National A-Division Football Championship, known as 1994 National Lifebuoy A-Division Football Championship due to sponsorship reasons, was the 42nd edition of the National Football Championship, Pakistan's premier domestic football competition. The league phase was held at Tehmas Khan Stadium, Peshawar from 16 April till 2 May 1994, and the Championship Final was held at Government Islamia College Ground, Faisalabad on 15 May 1994.

== Overview ==
National Bank were promoted after winning the 1993 National B-Division Football Championship. In the previous 1993–94 season, Pakistan Air Force had been relegated.

The league phase was held at Tehmas Khan Stadium, Peshawar from 16 April till 2 May 1994, and the Championship final was held at Government Islamia College Ground, Faisalabad on 15 May 1994.

== League phase ==
Pos	Team	Pld	W	D	L	GF	GA	GD	Pts	Qualification or relegation
1	WAPDA	7	6	1	0	12	0	+12	13	Advance to Championship Final
2	Crescent Textile Mills	7	3	3	1	7	3	+4	9	Advance to Championship Final
3	Pakistan Army	7	2	3	2	7	5	+2	7	
4	Habib Bank	7	2	3	2	6	5	+1	7	
5	Pakistan Airlines	7	3	0	4	5	9	−4	6	
6	National Bank	7	2	1	4	4	7	−3	5	
7	Wohaib	7	2	1	4	7	13	−6	5	
8	Pakistan Railways	7	1	2	4	3	9	−6	4	

Source: RSSSF

== Championship Final ==
15 May 1994

Crescent Textile Mills	1–0	WAPDA
	Report

Government Islamia College Ground, Faisalabad
