= Tanveer Ahmed (footballer) =

Pakistani football manager and former player

Personal information
- Date of birth: 15 April 1976 (age 50)
- Place of birth: Faisalabad, Pakistan
- Height: 1.91 m (6 ft 3 in)
- Position: Defender

Team information
- Current team: WAPDA (manager)

Senior career*
Years	Team	Apps	(Gls)
1992–1997	Pakistan Railways		
1998–1999	Crescent Textile Mills		
2000	PTCL		
2001–2010	WAPDA		

International career
2002–2006	Pakistan U23		
1999–2008	Pakistan	32	(3)

Managerial career
- 2012–2020: WAPDA (assistant)
- 2014–2015: Pakistan (assistant)
- 2020: WAPDA
- 2025–: Pakistan (assistant)
- * Club domestic league appearances and goals

Tanveer Ahmed (Urdu: تنویر احمد; born 15 April 1976) is a Pakistani football manager and former player who is the current head coach of WAPDA F.C. Ahmed played mainly as a centre-back, he also played as a right back.

== Club career ==
=== Early career ===
Ahmed started his career at Pakistan Railways in 1992, and later joined Crescent Textile Mills. He also played for PTCL.

=== WAPDA ===
He was transferred to WAPDA in the 2001 season, where he was given the captaincy and won the National Championship in 2003. In the new Pakistan Premier League in 2004, WAPDA were one of the favourites to win the title, but it took until the final day of the season before they were crowned champions. They lost the PPL the following year.

He also captained Lahore Lajpaals in the inaugural Super Football League 2007 in defense where he was a semi-finalist with the team.

== International career ==
Ahmed captained Pakistan at the 2005 Islamic Solidarity Games.

After initially retiring from international football after the 2010 FIFA World Cup qualification in 2007, Ahmed was once again called back to the national squad for the 2008 AFC Challenge Cup qualification by head coach Akhtar Mohiuddin. After failing to reach the AFC Challenge Cup he retired again.

== Managerial career ==
After retiring from international football after the 2010 FIFA World Cup qualification in 2007, Ahmed became WAPDA assistant manager as well as retaining his squad player status, and helped them with the 2007–08 Pakistan Premier League. After his playing retirement, Ahmed continued as assistant manager of the team until 2020. He also acted as assistant coach of the Pakistan national team in 2014 and 2015.

He received the AFC Bronze Star Award by the Pakistan Football Federation in 2013 for his contributions to the national team.

He became head coach at WAPDA in 2020, replacing Khalid Butt.

== Career statistics ==
=== International ===
Appearances and goals by national team and year
National team	Year	Apps	Goals
Pakistan	1999	2	0
Pakistan	2002	2	0
Pakistan	2003	9	0
Pakistan	2005	8	1
Pakistan	2006	4	1
Pakistan	2007	2	0
Pakistan	2008	5	1
Total		32	3

Scores and results list Pakistan's goal tally first, score column indicates score after each Ahmed goal.

List of international goals scored by Tanveer Ahmed
No.	Date	Venue	Opponent	Score	Result	Competition
1	18 June 2005	Punjab Stadium, Lahore, Pakistan	India	2–0	3–0	Friendly
2	15 November 2006	Mohammed bin Zayed Stadium, Abu Dhabi, UAE	United Arab Emirates	2–2	2–3	2007 AFC Asian Cup qualification
3	6 April 2008	Chungshan Stadium, Taipei, Taiwan	Guam	5–0	9–2	2008 AFC Challenge Cup qualification

== Honours ==
=== WAPDA ===
- National Football Championship: 2003
- Pakistan Premier League: 2004–05, 2007–08
