= 2001 National Football Championship (Pakistan) =

Tournament details
- Country: Pakistan
- Venue(s): Sadiq Shaheed Stadium, Quetta, Balochistan
- Dates: 29 July 2001 – 19 August 2001
- Teams: 24

Final positions
- Champions: WAPDA
- Runners-up: Khan Research Laboratories

Tournament statistics
- Matches played: 37
- Goals scored: 106 (2.86 per match)
- Top goal scorer(s): (Pakistan) Allah Nawaz (Khan Research Laboratories) (Pakistan) Gohar Zaman (Allied Bank) (6 goals each)

The 2001 National Football Championship was the 48th edition of the National Football Championship, Pakistan's premier domestic football competition. It was played at Sadiq Shaheed Stadium, Quetta from 29 July to 19 August 2001.

== Group stage ==
=== Group A ===
Pos	Team	Pld	W	D	L	GF	GA	GD	Pts	Qualification
1	Allied Bank	2	1	0	1	4	3	+1	3	Qualified for knockout stage
2	Pakistan Railways	2	1	0	1	2	2	0	3	Qualified for knockout stage
3	NWFP Red	2	1	0	1	4	5	−1	3	

Source: RSSSF
29 July 2001

Allied Bank	0–1	Pakistan Railways
	Report	Zaheer Abbas

6 August 2001

NWFP Red	2–1	Pakistan Railways
Nadir Khan; Samiullah	Report	Zaheer Abbas

6 August 2001

Allied Bank	4–2	NWFP Red
Zaman; Saifullah; Nasir Iqbal	Report	Nadir; Sami

=== Group B ===
Pos	Team	Pld	W	D	L	GF	GA	GD	Pts	Qualification
1	Khan Research Laboratories	2	2	0	0	6	1	+5	6	Qualified for knockout stage
2	Pakistan Police	2	1	0	1	6	3	+3	3	Qualified for knockout stage
3	Sindh Green	2	0	0	2	3	11	−8	0	

Source: RSSSF
29 July 2001

Khan Research Laboratories	1–0	Pakistan Police
Ayaz Muhammad	Report

29 July 2001

Pakistan Police	6–2	Sindh Green
Naseebullah; Iqbal; Attaullah; Ghulam Hussain; Nawaz	Report	Altaf; Muhammad Imran

5 August 2001

Khan Research Laboratories	5–1	Sindh Green
Sajjad; Allah Nawaz; Hameed	Report	Muhammad Imran

=== Group C ===
Pos	Team	Pld	W	D	L	GF	GA	GD	Pts	Qualification
1	Pakistan Navy	2	0	2	0	0	0	0	2	Qualified for knockout stage
2	National Bank	2	0	2	0	2	2	0	2	Qualified for knockout stage
3	Punjab Red	2	0	2	0	2	2	0	2	

Source: RSSSF
29 July 2001

Pakistan Navy	0–0	National Bank
	Report

29 July 2001

Pakistan Navy	0–0	Punjab Red
	Report

29 July 2001

National Bank	2–2	Punjab Red
Ashraf; Ismail	Report	Nasir; Farooq Khadim

=== Group D ===
Pos	Team	Pld	W	D	L	GF	GA	GD	Pts	Qualification
1	Karachi Port Trust	2	1	1	0	2	0	+2	4	Qualified for knockout stage
2	University Grants Commission	2	0	2	0	1	1	0	2	Qualified for knockout stage
3	Balochistan Green	2	0	1	1	1	3	−2	1	

Source: RSSSF
29 July 2001

University Grants Commission	1–1	Balochistan Green
Tahseen Agha	Report	Haji Muhammad

29 July 2001

Karachi Port Trust	0–0	University Grants Commission
	Report

29 July 2001

Karachi Port Trust	2–0	Balochistan Green
Majeed; Ghulam Farooq	Report

=== Group E ===
Pos	Team	Pld	W	D	L	GF	GA	GD	Pts	Qualification
1	Pakistan Telecommunication	2	1	1	0	3	0	+3	4	Qualified for knockout stage
2	Pakistan Air Force	2	0	2	0	3	3	0	2	Qualified for knockout stage
3	Balochistan Red	2	0	1	1	3	6	−3	1	

Source: RSSSF
29 July 2001

Pakistan Air Force	3–3	Balochistan Red
Arshad; Fazal	Report	Marshal; Saadula

29 July 2001

Pakistan Air Force	0–0	Pakistan Telecommunication
	Report

6 August 2001

Pakistan Telecommunication	3–0	Balochistan Red
Ahmed; Saleem Butt; Hameed	Report

=== Group F ===
Pos	Team	Pld	W	D	L	GF	GA	GD	Pts	Qualification
1	Pakistan Army	1	1	0	0	2	0	+2	3	Qualified for knockout stage
2	Sindh Red	1	0	0	1	0	2	−2	0	Qualified for knockout stage
3	KMC (withdrew)	0	0	0	0	0	0	0	0	

Source: RSSSF
5 August 2001

Pakistan Army	2–0	Sindh Red
Zahid; Ahsanullah	Report

=== Group G ===
Pos	Team	Pld	W	D	L	GF	GA	GD	Pts	Qualification
1	Pakistan International Airlines	2	2	0	0	6	1	+5	6	Qualified for knockout stage
2	Punjab Green	2	1	0	1	2	4	−2	3	Qualified for knockout stage
3	Sui Southern Gas	2	0	0	2	1	4	−3	0	

Source: RSSSF
29 July 2001

PIA	2–1	Sui Southern Gas
Niaz; Majeed	Report	Arif

29 July 2001

Punjab Green	2–0	Sui Southern Gas
Asif Nawaz	Report

29 July 2001

PIA	4–0	Punjab Green
Nasim; Umar; Essa; Niaz	Report

=== Group H ===
Pos	Team	Pld	W	D	L	GF	GA	GD	Pts	Qualification
1	WAPDA	2	1	1	0	7	1	+6	4	Qualified for knockout stage
2	NWFP Green	2	1	0	1	2	7	−5	3	Qualified for knockout stage
3	Habib Bank	2	0	1	1	0	1	−1	1	

Source: RSSSF
29 July 2001

HBL	0–0	WAPDA
	Report

29 July 2001

WAPDA	7–1	NWFP Green
Bakhsh; Mehmood; Qamaruddin; Altaf; M. Niaz	Report	Nadeem

29 July 2001

NWFP Green	1–0	HBL
Raja	Report

== Knockout stage ==
=== Round of 16 ===
10 August 2001

Punjab Red	0–0	Pakistan Railways
	Report
Penalties
	5–4

10 August 2001

Pakistan Telecommunication	1–0	Punjab Green
Hameed	Report

11 August 2001

Pakistan Army	3–0	NWFP Green
Ahsanullah; Zahid; Ghulam Nabi	Report

11 August 2001

WAPDA	4–0	Sindh Red
Mehmood; Altaf; M. Niaz	Report

12 August 2001

Khan Research Laboratories	6–0	University Grants Commission
Allah Nawaz; Hidayatullah; Sohail	Report

12 August 2001

PIA	2–1	Pakistan Air Force
Niaz; Essa	Report	Parwaiz

13 August 2001

Allied Bank	3–2	National Bank
Zaman; Qadeer	Report	Shamim; Basit

13 August 2001

KPT	0–2	Pakistan Police
	Report	Aslam; Naseebullah

=== Quarter-finals ===
14 August 2001

Pakistan Army	1–0	Pakistan Telecommunication
Ahsanullah	Report

14 August 2001

WAPDA	1–0	PIA
Mehmood	Report

15 August 2001

Khan Research Laboratories	3–2	Allied Bank
Sajjad; Sohail	Report	Zaman

15 August 2001

Pakistan Police	7–0	Punjab Red
Nawaz; Aslam; Fida; Naseebullah own goal	Report

=== Semi-finals ===
16 August 2001

WAPDA	1–0	Pakistan Army
own goal	Report

17 August 2001

Khan Research Laboratories	2–1	Pakistan Police
Hameed Khan; Allah Nawaz	Report	Naseebullah

=== Final ===
19 August 2001

WAPDA	1–1 (a.e.t.)	Khan Research Laboratories
Bakhsh 67'	Report	Sohailur Rehman 63'
Penalties
	4–3

== Statistics ==
=== Top goalscorers ===
Rank	Player	Team	Goals
1	Allah Nawaz	Khan Research Laboratories	6
1	Gohar Zaman	Allied Bank	6
3	Sajjad Hussain	Khan Research Laboratories	5
3	Naseebullah	Pakistan Police	5
3	Arif Mehmood	WAPDA	5
6	Ahsanullah	Pakistan Army	3
6	Zahid Niaz	Pakistan Airlines	3
6	Aslam	Pakistan Police	3
6	Nawaz	Pakistan Police	3
6	Khuda Bakhsh	WAPDA	3
