= Muhammad Naqi Khan =

Pakistani former footballer and manager

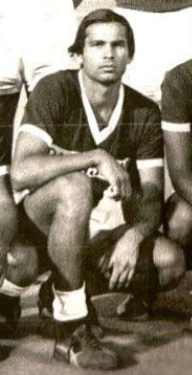
- Naqi with Pakistan in 1978

Personal information
- Full name: Muhammad Naqi Khan
- Position: Defender

Senior career*
Years	Team	Apps	(Gls)
1976–1987	Pakistan Airlines		

International career
1976–1978	Pakistan		
- * Club domestic league appearances and goals

Muhammad Naqi Khan is a Pakistani former footballer who played as a defender, and former manager. Naqi is among the major players of the Pakistan national football team in the 1970s.

== Club career ==
Naqi played as defender for PIA from 1976 till 1987, and played a crucial role in winning several National Football Championship titles with the team. He also played for PIA in the 1981–82 Aga Khan Gold Cup held in Bangladesh.

== International career ==
Naqi represented the Pakistan national football team in the 1970s. In 1976–1977 he featured at the Afghanistan Republic Day Festival Cup. Naqi was part of the second string Pakistan Reds team at the 1976 Quaid-e-Azam International Tournament. He was also part of the Pakistan national team for the Saudi Arabia Football Federation International Tournament in 1978.

== Coaching career ==
After retiring as player, Naqi served as trainer of PIA's hockey and squash teams and the manager of PIA Fitness Club from 1988 to 2002. He was also part of the District Football Association Karachi Central in the 2010s.

== Honours ==
=== Pakistan Airlines ===
- National Football Championship: 1976, 1978, 1981
- Inter-Provincial Championship: 1984
