= Arbab Hayat Shahzada =

Pakistani footballer (born 1959)

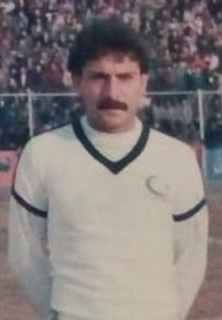
- Shahzada with Pakistan in 1986

Personal information
- Full name: Arbab Muhammad Hayat Shahzada Kasi
- Date of birth: 22 January 1959 (age 67)
- Place of birth: Quetta, Pakistan
- Position: Centre-back

Senior career*
Years	Team	Apps	(Gls)
- Markers Club Quetta

International career
1984–1987	Pakistan		(1)
- * Club domestic league appearances and goals

Arbab Hayat Shahzada (Urdu: ارباب حیات شہزادہ; born 22 January 1959) is a Pakistani former footballer who played as a defender. Shahzada captained the Pakistan national football team in the 1985 South Asian Games.

== Club career ==
Shahzada played for Quetta based Markers Club in the 1980s. He also represented Quetta Division selection first being selected in 1981. He won the 1985 National Football Championship with the team.

== International career ==
Shahzada received his first call-up for the 1984 AFC Qualifiers held in India scoring a goal against North Yemen. The following year, he captained the national team at the 1985 South Asian Games.

He also played at the 1986 Fajr International Tournament, and the 1986 Asian Games. In 1987, he was last part of the national team for the 1988 Summer Olympic qualifiers against Nepal.

== Career statistics ==
=== International goals ===
Scores and results list Pakistan's goal tally first, score column indicates score after each Shahzada goal.

List of international goals scored by Arbab Hayat Shahzada
No.	Date	Venue	Opponent	Score	Result	Competition	Ref.
1	15 October 1984	Salt Lake Stadium, Calcutta, India	North Yemen	2–1	4–1	1984 AFC Asian Cup qualification	

== See also ==
- List of Pakistan national football team captains

== Honours ==
=== Player ===
Quetta

- National Football Championship:
  - Winners (1): 1985
