= 2003 National Football Championship (Pakistan) =

Tournament details
- Country: Pakistan
- Venue(s): Bannu, North-West Frontier Province
- Dates: 25 April 2003 – 18 May 2003
- Teams: 24

Final positions
- Champions: WAPDA
- Runners-up: Pakistan Army

Tournament statistics
- Top goal scorer(s): Imran Hussain (Pakistan Army) (7 goals)

The 2003 National Football Championship was the 49th edition of the National Football Championship, the premier football competition in Pakistan. It was played in Bannu from 25 April to 18 May 2003.

== Group stage ==
=== Group A ===
Pos	Team	Pld	W	D	L	GF	GA	GD	Pts	Qualification
1	WAPDA	2	2	0	0	5	1	+4	6	Qualified for knockout stage
2	NWFP Red	2	1	0	1	2	4	−2	3	Qualified for knockout stage
3	Sui Southern Gas	2	0	0	2	2	4	−2	0	

Source: RSSSF
25 April 2003

WAPDA	3–0	NWFP Red
Bakhsh; Mehmood	Report

28 April 2003

NWFP Red	2–1	Sui Southern Gas
Nazir Ullah 20'; Taj Mohammed 60'	Report	Anwar 35'

30 April 2003

WAPDA	2–1	Sui Southern Gas
Mehmood; Bakhsh		Allahuddin

=== Group B ===
Pos	Team	Pld	W	D	L	GF	GA	GD	Pts	Qualification
1	Habib Bank	2	1	1	0	4	0	+4	4	Qualified for knockout stage
2	Pakistan Air Force	2	0	2	0	0	0	0	2	Qualified for knockout stage
3	Punjab Green	2	0	1	1	0	4	−4	1	

Source: RSSSF
26 April 2003

Pakistan Air Force	0–0	Habib Bank
	Report

3 May 2003

Pakistan Air Force	0–0	Punjab Green
	Report

5 May 2003

Habib Bank	4–0	Punjab Green
Saleem; Shakir; Habib Ghulam	Report

=== Group C ===
Pos	Team	Pld	W	D	L	GF	GA	GD	Pts	Qualification
1	Pakistan Telecommunication	2	2	0	0	4	0	+4	6	Qualified for knockout stage
2	Pakistan Police	2	1	0	1	2	3	−1	3	Qualified for knockout stage
3	Balochistan Red	2	0	0	2	1	4	−3	0	

Source: RSSSF
26 April 2003

Pakistan Police	0–2	Pakistan Telecommunication
	Report	Ahmed 3', 35'

29 April 2003

Pakistan Police	2–1	Balochistan Red
Sher Zaman; Nida Muhammad	Report	Muhammad Naeem

30 April 2003

Pakistan Telecommunication	2–0	Balochistan Red
Ahmed 20', 74'	Report

=== Group D ===
Pos	Team	Pld	W	D	L	GF	GA	GD	Pts	Qualification
1	Pakistan Navy	2	1	1	0	6	0	+6	4	Qualified for knockout stage
2	Allied Bank	2	1	1	0	6	0	+6	4	Qualified for knockout stage
3	Sindh Green	2	0	0	2	0	12	−12	0	

Source: RSSSF
3 May 2003

Pakistan Navy	6–0	Sindh Green
Saleem; Nomi Martin Gill; Zahir Ahmed	Report

5 May 2003

Allied Bank	6–0	Sindh Green
Abdul Khaliq; Amir Khan; M. Yousuf; Zakariya	Report

8 May 2003

Pakistan Navy	0–0	Allied Bank
	Report

Navy won the group on a coin toss.

=== Group E ===
Pos	Team	Pld	W	D	L	GF	GA	GD	Pts	Qualification
1	Pakistan Army	3	3	0	0	12	1	+11	9	Qualified for knockout stage
2	FATA	3	2	0	1	7	2	+5	6	Qualified for knockout stage
3	CDGK	3	0	1	2	0	6	−6	1	
4	Punjab Red	3	0	1	2	0	10	−10	1	

Source: RSSSF
2 May 2003

Pakistan Army	6–0	Punjab Red
Hussain 17', 35'; Muhammad Zahid 33'; Kashif	Report

2 May 2003

FATA	2–0	CDGK
Abdul Samat 48'; Saghi	Report

4 May 2003

Pakistan Army	2–1	FATA
Ghulam Ali 53' (pen.); Hussain 67'	Report	Nadar Khan 45'

4 May 2003

Punjab Red	0–0	CDGK
	Report

6 May 2003

FATA	4–0	Punjab Red
Mohammad Saeed 26'; Samiullah 59'; Saki Rehman 66'; Allah Din 84'	Report

7 May 2003

Pakistan Army	4–0	CDGK
Hussain; Majid; Muzafar; Sanaullah	Report

=== Group F ===
Pos	Team	Pld	W	D	L	GF	GA	GD	Pts	Qualification
1	Karachi Port Trust	2	1	1	0	5	0	+5	4	Qualified for knockout stage
2	Pakistan Railways	2	1	1	0	1	0	+1	4	Qualified for knockout stage
3	NWFP Green	2	0	0	2	0	6	−6	0	

Source: RSSSF
27 April 2003

Pakistan Railways	1–0	NWFP Green
Kaleem Akhtar 15'	Report

29 April 2003

KPT	5–0	NWFP Green
Shakir Taj; Majeed; Qasim Faiz; Ghulam Farooq	Report

7 May 2003

Pakistan Railways	0–0	KPT
	Report

=== Group G ===
Pos	Team	Pld	W	D	L	GF	GA	GD	Pts	Qualification
1	Pakistan International Airlines	2	1	1	0	3	2	+1	4	Qualified for knockout stage
2	Balochistan Green	2	1	0	1	2	2	0	3	Qualified for knockout stage
3	National Bank	2	0	1	1	3	4	−1	1	

Source: RSSSF
27 April 2003

PIA	2–2	National Bank
Javed Niaz 40'; Shahid Ismail 90' (pen.)	Report	Akhtar Rasool 76'; Abdul Sattar 80'

29 April 2003

PIA	1–0	Balochistan Green
Niaz	Report

2 May 2003

National Bank	1–2	Balochistan Green
Jamil	Report	Azam

=== Group H ===
Pos	Team	Pld	W	D	L	GF	GA	GD	Pts	Qualification
1	Khan Research Laboratories	2	1	1	0	6	2	+4	4	Qualified for knockout stage
2	Sindh Red	2	1	1	0	4	1	+3	4	Qualified for knockout stage
3	University Grants Commission	2	0	0	2	1	8	−7	0	

Source: RSSSF
1 May 2003

University Grants Commission	1–5	Khan Research Laboratories
Salman	Report	Q. Ahmed; Ayaz Mohammad; Allah Nawaz; Rasool

6 May 2003

University Grants Commission	0–3	Sindh Red
	Report	Akbar Ali 51'; Muhammad Musa 67'; Aurangzeb 87'

8 May 2003

Khan Research Laboratories	1–1	Sindh Red
Hayatullah	Report	M. Nazeer

== Knockout stage ==
=== Round of 16 ===
9 May 2003

WAPDA	2–0	Pakistan Air Force
Arif Mehmood	Report

9 May 2003

Pakistan Army	3–0	Pakistan Railways
M. Kashif; Jaffar Hussain; Imran Hussain	Report

10 May 2003

Khan Research Laboratories	1–0	Balochistan Green
Allah Nawaz 13'	Report

10 May 2003

PIA	1–3	Sindh Red
Shahid Ismail 27' (pen.)	Report	Muhammad Musa 9'; Aurangzeb 75'; Ghafoor 81'

11 May 2003

Pakistan Navy	3–0	Pakistan Police
Basharat Ali; Zaheer Ahmed; Nazakat Hussain	Report

11 May 2003

KPT	0–0 (a.e.t.)	FATA
	Report
Penalties
	4–2

12 May 2003

Pakistan Telecommunication	1–0	Allied Bank
Adeel Ahmed 71'	Report

12 May 2003

Habib Bank	2–0	NWFP Red
Shahid Saleem; Amjad Hussain	Report

=== Quarter-finals ===
13 May 2003

Pakistan Army	1–0	Sindh Red
Nasir Iqbal 83'	Report

13 May 2003

FATA	1–2 (a.e.t.)	Khan Research Laboratories
Samee	Report	Qadeer Ahmed; Allah Nawaz (golden goal)

14 May 2003

WAPDA	1–0	Pakistan Telecommunication
Khuda Bukhsh 5'	Report

14 May 2003

Habib Bank	1–1 (a.e.t.)	Pakistan Navy
Abdul Waheed	Report	Iqbal
Penalties
	4–2

=== Semi-finals ===
15 May 2003

Pakistan Army	1–0	Khan Research Laboratories
Imran Hussain	Report

16 May 2003

WAPDA	4–1	Habib Bank
Khuda Bukhsh 20'; Arif Mehmood 54'; Muhammad Niaz 73'; Muhammad Fakhar 85'	Report	Muhammad Zahir 78'

=== Final ===
18 May 2003

WAPDA	0–0	Pakistan Army
	Report
Penalties
Khuda Bakhsh (penalty scored); Muhammad Jamshed (penalty scored); Qamar Zaman (penalty scored); Muhammad Niaz (penalty scored)	4–2	Shahid Nadeem (penalty scored); Jaffar Khan (penalty scored)

== Statistics ==
=== Top goalscorers ===
Rank	Player	Team	Goals
1	Imran Hussain	Pakistan Army	7
2	Adeel Ahmed	Pakistan Telecommunication	5
3	Khuda Bukhsh	WAPDA	4
3	Saleem	Pakistan Navy	4
3	Arif Mehmood	WAPDA	4
6	Shahid Saleem	Habib Bank	3
6	Qadeer Ahmed	Khan Research Laboratories	3
6	Allah Nawaz	Khan Research Laboratories	3
