= Shaukat Ali (footballer) =

Pakistani footballer (born 1964)

Personal information
- Full name: Shaukat Ali
- Date of birth: 12 March 1964 (age 62)
- Place of birth: Sialkot, Pakistan
- Position: Midfielder

Senior career*
Years	Team	Apps	(Gls)
1988–2001	Pakistan Army		

International career
1989–1990	Pakistan	4	(0)

Managerial career
- Pakistan Army
- * Club domestic league appearances and goals

Shaukat Ali (born 12 March 1964) is a Pakistani former footballer, and manager. He contributed to Pakistan's win for the 1989 South Asian Games title, he also played at the 1990 Asian Games.

== Club career ==
In 1994, Shaukat featured in the National Youth Football Championship. Shaukat would go on to captain Pakistan Army on several occasions, also helping them win the National Football Championship in 1993–94 and in 1995, alongside the President PFF Cup which they won back-to-back in 2000 and 2001. Under his captainship, the team also won the National Games three times, in 1995, 1997, 2001.

== International career ==
Shaukat was selected for the 1989 South Asian Games, being included into the starting line-up for the final which Pakistan won against Bangladesh by 1–0. The next year, he played with the national team at the 1990 Asian Games, featuring as a starter in all three group stage matches.

== Coaching career ==
After his retirement as player, Shaukat coached the Pakistan Army team. He also oversaw the selection of the Islamabad United team at the Super Football League in 2010.

== Honours ==
=== Army ===
- National Football Championship
  - Winners (2): 1993–94, 1995
- National Football Challenge Cup
  - Winners (2): 2000, 2001
- National Games
  - Winners (3): 1995, 1997, 2001

=== Pakistan ===
- South Asian Games:
  - Winners (1): 1989
