= Najeeb Ullah Najmi =

Pakistani footballer

- Najeeb during the 1999 South Asian Games

Personal information
- Full name: Mirza Najeeb Ullah Najmi
- Date of birth: 10 October 1958
- Place of birth: Peshawar, Pakistan
- Date of death: 1 September 2021 (aged 62)
- Place of death: Peshawar, Pakistan
- Position: Midfielder

Senior career*
Years	Team	Apps	(Gls)
1980s	Pakistan Air Force		

International career
1982	Pakistan Blues	6	(0)
1980s	Pakistan		

Managerial career
- 2010–2014: Zarai Taraqiati
- 2018–2019: Ashraf Sugar Mills
- * Club domestic league appearances and goals

Mirza Najeeb Ullah Najmi (10 October 1958 – 1 September 2021) was a Pakistani footballer and manager. Najeeb represented and subsequently captained the Pakistan national team in the 1980s. He also led Pakistan Air Force to their first National Football Championship title in 1986.

== Club career ==
Najeeb represented the Pakistan Air Force departmental team at the National Football Championship, where he led the club to win the title in the 1986 edition.

== International career ==
Najeeb represented Pakistan Blues, which was the youth national side, at the 1982 Quaid-e-Azam International Tournament.

Najeeb represented the senior Pakistan national football team in the 1980s. He captained the national side at the 1984 AFC Asian Cup qualification held in Calcutta, during a match against North Yemen.

== Managerial career ==
Najeeb was member of the coaching staff of the Pakistan national team at the 1999 South Asian Games held in Kathmandu. In 2010, Najeeb was appointed head coach of Zarai Taraqiati, which he led to its promotion to the top-tier from the 2011 PFF League. In 2012, he was also appointed manager of the Pakistan under-14 team. In 2014, Najeeb attended the an Asian Football Confederation Licence A coaching course in Bahrain. In 2015, he was appointed as assistant to the Iranian instructor Ardeshir Pournemat Noudehi for the AFC License A coaching course held in Pakistan for the first time.

In 2018, he led the Ashraf Sugar Mills departmental team at the 2018–19 Pakistan Premier League. The team, owned by former Pakistan Cricket Board chairman Zaka Ashraf, eventually withdrew from the league due to financial issues.

== Death ==
Najeeb died on 1 September 2021.

== Honours ==
Pakistan Air Force

- National Football Championship: 1986

== See also ==
- List of Pakistan national football team captains
