= Muhammad Omar (footballer, born 1990) =

Pakistani footballer

Personal information
- Date of birth: 2 June 1990 (age 36)
- Place of birth: Karachi, Pakistan
- Position: Goalkeeper

Senior career*
Years	Team	Apps	(Gls)
2010–2012	KESC	25	(0)
2012–2021	National Bank	62	(0)

International career
2011	Pakistan U23		
2011	Pakistan	1	(0)
- * Club domestic league appearances and goals

Muhammad Omar (born 2 June 1990) is a Pakistani former footballer who played as a goalkeeper.

== Club career ==
=== KESC ===
Omar represented Karachi Energy at the 2010 Super Football League, where he led the team to the title, and was declared best goalkeeper of the tournament. Omar first played for KESC in the 2010–11 Pakistan Premier League, finishing fourth in the table. He was declared goalkeeper of the year and was awarded a Rupees 50,000 prize.

=== NBP ===
Omar moved to NBP F.C. in 2012. In a 0–0 draw against KRL which saw the latter retain their Pakistan Premier League title, Omar was declared man of the match and awarded 2,500 Rupees. He subsequently won the 2013 National Football Challenge Cup with NBP, where he was declared the best goalkeeper of the competition. At the 2016 Pakistan Football Federation Cup, Omar helped NBP finish as runner-up of the tournament, falling to KRL in the final.

=== Later career ===
In 2022, Omar played for Lyari Fighters in the Sindh Super League, a franchise-based football league held in the province of Sindh. He helped the team finish as runner-up after falling to Larkana Leopards by 0–1 in the final. Omar was subsequently declared goalkeeper of the tournament.

== International career ==
Omar made his debut with the Pakistan under-23 team in the 2012 Summer Olympics qualifiers against Malaysia as a replacement for Yousuf Butt, who conceded both goals in the first half in the eventual 0–2 defeat. He also played in test series against Palestine the same year.

He made his senior international debut at the 2012 AFC Challenge Cup qualifications against Turkmenistan on 21 March 2011, where he was substituted off at 78th minute for Amir Gul.

== Career statistics ==
=== International ===
As of 17 October 2012

Appearances and goals by national team and year
National team	Year	Apps	Goals
Pakistan	2011	1	0
Total		1	0

== Honours ==
=== Club ===
==== Karachi Energy ====
- Super Football League: 2010

National Bank

- National Football Challenge Cup: 2013

=== Individual ===
- Goalkeeper of the year: 2010–11
