= 1970 Aga Khan Gold Cup =

Tournament details
- Host country: East Pakistan (now Bangladesh)
- Dates: 7 – 31 October 1970
- Teams: 17 (from 1 confederation)
- Venue: Dhaka Stadium (in Dhaka host cities)

Final positions
- Champions: (Iran) Bargh Shiraz

The 1970 Aga Khan Gold Cup was held at the Dhaka Stadium in Dhaka, East Pakistan (now Bangladesh), from 7 October 1970 to 31 October 1970. Bargh Shiraz were declared winners after defeating Persebaya Surabaya. The final match was abandoned due to a brawl. The trophy was ultimately awarded to Bargh Shiraz.

== Overview ==
The matches lasted 70 minutes, with 5 minutes recess. An additional 15 minutes of extra time was played if a match ended in a draw.

Three foreign teams, Persebaya Surabaya, Bargh Shiraz and Ceylon XI, received byes to the round-robin league and did not participate in the qualifying stage. Another foreign Nepali team however had to play the preliminary stage. A team from Thailand was originally expected to participate, but withdrew due to commitments in the South Vietnam Independence Cup and was replaced by Ceylon XI.

EPIDC defeated Ceylon XI by two-nil in an exhibition match on 27 October 1970.

== Qualifying stage ==
=== Group A ===
==== First round ====
8 October 1970

Dhaka Wanderers (Pakistan)	2–2	(Pakistan) EPG Press
Kazi; Habib	Report	Jewel 13'; Naim 20'

Dhaka Stadium, Dhaka
Referee: Issa Khan (Pakistan)
9 October 1970

East End Club (Pakistan)	0–6	(Pakistan) Victoria SC
	Report	Alamgir 17'; Kader 27', 30'; Nawsher 29', 34', 50'

Dhaka Stadium, Dhaka
Referee: M. Chowdhury (Pakistan)
11 October 1970

Pakistan Airlines	1–0	(Pakistan) EP WAPDA
Allah Bakhsh 20'	Report

Dhaka Stadium, Dhaka
Referee: S.A. Rashid (Pakistan)

===== Replay =====
10 October 1970

Dhaka Wanderers (Pakistan)	2–2	(Pakistan) EPG Press
Jalu 41'; Habib 53'	Report	Alim 5', 61'

Dhaka Stadium, Dhaka
Referee: Zahurul Alam (Pakistan)
11 October 1970

Dhaka Wanderers (Pakistan)	Walkover	(Pakistan) EPG Press
	Report

Dhaka Stadium, Dhaka

==== Second round ====
11 October 1970

Victoria SC (Pakistan)	0–2	(Pakistan) Dhaka Mohammedan
	Report	Amir Bakhsh 17'; Idrees Sr. 28'

Dhaka Stadium, Dhaka
Referee: Mohammad Ali (Pakistan)
13 October 1970

Dhaka Wanderers (Pakistan)	4–1	Nepal XI
Moosa 10', 55', 65'; Jalu 45'	Report	Nara Kazi 67'

Dhaka Stadium, Dhaka
Referee: Mohammad Ali (Pakistan)

=== Group B ===
==== First round ====
7 October 1970

Wari Club (Pakistan)	1–2	(Pakistan) Fire Service
Amir	Report	Salam 18', 75'

Dhaka Stadium, Dhaka
Referee: Zahurul Alam (Pakistan)
9 October 1970

Peshawar Division (Pakistan)	4–0	(Pakistan) Rahmatganj MFS
Ikram Rana 12', 39'; Nazir 58'; Ghani 64'	Report

Dhaka Stadium, Dhaka
Referee: Mohammad Ali (Pakistan)

==== Second round ====
10 October 1970

Fire Service (Pakistan)	3–2	(Pakistan) EPIDC
Salam 30'; Kader 42'; Angoor 58'	Report	Jabbar 2'; Nawaz 53'

Dhaka Stadium, Dhaka
Referee: S.A. Rashid (Pakistan)
12 October 1970

Peshawar Division (Pakistan)	Walkover	Pakistan Western Railway
	Report

Dhaka Stadium, Dhaka

== Round robin league ==
=== Group A ===
Pos	Team	Pld	W	D	L	GF	GA	GD	Pts	Qualification
1	(Indonesia) Persebaya Surabaya	3	2	1	0	4	1	+3	5	Advance to the semi-finals
2	(Pakistan) Dhaka Mohammedan	3	1	2	0	5	3	+2	4	Advance to the semi-finals
3	(Pakistan) Dhaka Wanderers	3	0	2	1	3	4	−1	2	
4	Pakistan Airlines	3	0	1	2	1	5	−4	1	

Source: RSSSF
14 October 1970

Pakistan Airlines	0–2	(Pakistan) Dhaka Mohammedan
	Report	Idrees Sr. 28'; Dar 38'

Dhaka Stadium, Dhaka
Referee: Zahurul Alam (Pakistan)
16 October 1970

Dhaka Wanderers (Pakistan)	1–1	Pakistan Airlines
Moosa 2'	Report	Jani 15'

Dhaka Stadium, Dhaka
Referee: Zahurul Alam (Pakistan)
19 October 1970

Persebaya Surabaya (Indonesia)	1–1	(Pakistan) Dhaka Mohammedan
Dhalie 47'	Report	Pratap 27'

Dhaka Stadium, Dhaka
Referee: Mohammad Ali (Pakistan)
21 October 1970

Pakistan Airlines	0–2	(Indonesia) Persebaya Surabaya
	Report	Lesmana 4'; Ghulam Hussain 28' (o.g.)

Dhaka Stadium, Dhaka
Referee: S.A. Rashid (Pakistan)
23 October 1970

Dhaka Mohammedan (Pakistan)	2–2	(Pakistan) Dhaka Wanderers
Tipu 6'; Salahuddin 27'	Report	Nazir 1'; Moosa

Dhaka Stadium, Dhaka
Referee: Mohammad Ali (Pakistan)
26 October 1970

Persebaya Surabaya (Indonesia)	1–0	(Pakistan) Dhaka Wanderers
Abdillah 13'	Report

Dhaka Stadium, Dhaka
Referee: Zahurul Alam (Pakistan)

=== Group B ===
Pos	Team	Pld	W	D	L	GF	GA	GD	Pts	Qualification
1	(Iran) Bargh Shiraz	3	2	1	0	7	1	+6	5	Advance to the semi-finals
2	(Pakistan) Peshawar Division	3	1	2	0	3	2	+1	4	Advance to the semi-finals
3	(Dominion of Ceylon) Ceylon XI	3	1	0	2	11	2	+9	2	
4	(Pakistan) Fire Service	3	0	1	2	1	17	−16	1	

Source: RSSSF
15 October 1970

Peshawar Division (Pakistan)	1–1	(Pakistan) Fire Service
Bimal (o.g.)	Report	Angoor 1'

Dhaka Stadium, Dhaka
Referee: Issa Khan (Pakistan)
18 October 1970

Ceylon XI (Dominion of Ceylon)	0–1	(Pakistan) Peshawar Division
	Report	Rana 26'

Dhaka Stadium, Dhaka
Referee: S.A. Rashid (Pakistan)
20 October 1970

Bargh Shiraz (Iran)	5–0	(Pakistan) Fire Service
Absanasan 6', 24', 35'; Narogi 37' (pen.); Hagigat 49'	Report

Dhaka Stadium, Dhaka
Referee: Zahurul Alam (Pakistan)
22 October 1970

Peshawar Division (Pakistan)	1–1	(Iran) Bargh Shiraz
Nazeer 38'	Report	Hagigat 10'

Dhaka Stadium, Dhaka
Referee: Zahurul Alam (Pakistan)
24 October 1970

Fire Service (Pakistan)	0–11	(Dominion of Ceylon) Ceylon XI
	Report	Hassimdeen; Nelson Perera; Amidon; Preena

Dhaka Stadium, Dhaka
Referee: S.A. Rashid (Pakistan)
25 October 1970

Bargh Shiraz (Iran)	1–0	(Dominion of Ceylon) Ceylon XI
Absanasan 32'	Report

Dhaka Stadium, Dhaka
Referee: Mohammad Ali (Pakistan)

== Knockout stage ==
=== Semi-finals ===
28 October 1970

Persebaya Surabaya (Indonesia)	1–0 (a.e.t.)	(Pakistan) Peshawar Division
Lesmana 77'	Report

Dhaka Stadium, Dhaka
Referee: S.A. Rashid (Pakistan)
29 October 1970

Bargh Shiraz (Iran)	3–0	(Pakistan) Dhaka Mohammedan
Hagigat 17', 31'; Absanasan 69'	Report

Dhaka Stadium, Dhaka
Referee: Mohammad Ali (Pakistan)

=== Final ===
31 October 1970

Bargh Shiraz (Iran)	Abandoned (2–1) (Note: The match was abandoned at 2–1 due to a brawl.)	(Indonesia) Persebaya Surabaya
Hagigat 27', 39'	Report	Abdillah 44'

Dhaka Stadium, Dhaka
Referee: Zahurul Alam (Pakistan)
