= Alamgir Khan (footballer) =

Pakistani footballer

Personal information
- Full name: Alamgir Khan
- Date of birth: 16 June 1991 (age 35)
- Place of birth: Peshawar, Pakistan
- Position: Defender

Senior career*
Years	Team	Apps	(Gls)
2010	Pakistan Airlines	?	(?)
2011–2012	Police		
2013–2014	WAPDA		

International career
2011	Pakistan	1	(0)
- * Club domestic league appearances and goals

Alamgir Khan is a Pakistani former footballer who played as a defender for domestic clubs as well as the Pakistan national team.

== Club career ==
Alamgir started playing for PIA in 2010. He played for Police FC until 2012 and then contracted for WAPDA in 2013.

== International career ==
Khan earned his first international cap at the 2012 AFC Challenge Cup qualifications against Taiwan.

== Career statistics ==
=== International ===
Appearances and goals by year and competition
National team	Year	Apps	Goals
Pakistan	2011	1	0
Total		1	0
