= Khalid Butt (footballer) =

Pakistani footballer and manager (born 1958)

Personal information
- Full name: Khalid Mehmood Butt
- Date of birth: 30 November 1958 (age 67)
- Place of birth: Gujranwala, Pakistan
- Position: Winger

Senior career*
Years	Team	Apps	(Gls)
1978–2002	WAPDA		

International career
1982	Pakistan Blues	6	(0)
1981–1989	Pakistan	??	(??)

Managerial career
- 2004–2011: WAPDA
- 2013–2015: WAPDA
- 2017–2019: WAPDA
- * Club domestic league appearances and goals

Khalid Mehmood Butt (Urdu: خالد محمود بٹ; born 30 November 1958), is a Pakistani former footballer who played as a winger, and manager. Butt is among the major players of the Pakistan national football team in the 1980s and 1990s, and was part of the national squad which won gold at the 1989 South Asian Games. He is the most successful coach in Pakistan Premier League history, where he led WAPDA to clinch four titles. He also led in the 2007–08 season when the team finished the season unbeaten, being the first Pakistani club to achieve the feat.

== Early life ==
Butt was born on 30 November 1958 in Gujranwala, in the Punjab province of Pakistan. He matriculated from Government High School Gujranwala. Butt initially took athletics as his path like his father, and competed in several district and division in the 100 and 200 meter races. He later started playing football at the school level as a right winger. At the age of 14, he joined the Al-Hilal club of Gujranwala where he progressed through their youth teams. In 1974, he was appointed captain of the Lahore Division under-20 team. In 1977, he was selected for the Punjab Youth and in the same year he was selected for the Punjab senior team.

== Club career ==
Butt joined National Football Championship departmental side WAPDA, winning the title three times with the club in 1983, 1991, and 2001. He captained the side to the title in the team's maiden appearance. Two years earlier in 1981, Butt also featured in the National Youth Football Championship. He played for WAPDA until 2002.

== International career ==
In 1981, Butt was selected for the Pakistan national team for a goodwill tour to Burma, and later participated in the 1981 King's Cup held in Thailand, where he performed against Malaysia, Singapore, and the Chinese team August 1st.

In 1982, he was selected for the youth team by the name of Pakistan Blues team in the 1982 Quaid-e-Azam International Tournament held in Karachi, where he played as a regular starter.

In 1984, Butt was also selected for the 1984 Merdeka Tournament in Kuala Lumpur, where he scored a goal in a 1–6 defeat against the China national football B team. Butt also featured at the 1984 AFC Asian Cup qualification the same year.

Butt was part of the national squad which won gold at the 1989 South Asian Games, which proved to be his last international tournament.

== Coaching career ==
After his playing career, Butt soon became head coach of WAPDA, leading the side to win the Pakistan Premier League title in 2004–05, 2007–08, 2008–09, 2010–11. In the 2007–08 season, the team finished the season unbeaten, being the first Pakistani club to achieve the feat.

He also led the team AFC President's Cup in 2005, 2008, 2009, and 2011. In 2009, under his guidance the team made a notable impact, as it lost in extra time of semi-finals 4–3 against home side and eventual winners Regar-TadAZ of Tajikistan. In November 2010, due to AFC coaching license requirements, WAPDA appointed Mohammad Habib as their officially qualified coach for the remainder of the 2010 Pakistan Premier League season, even though Khalid Butt remained the team's head coach in practice. In January 2011, he was awarded an honorary AFC C licence.

From 2011 till 2013, Butt left the coach position during which his absence in the consequent years proved unfortunate for the team, as the side failed to show significant performance in the previous years and win the title. He left the team again in 2015, returning in 2017 after another two-year sabbatical absence. After several years of domestic football inactivity due to the crisis inside the Pakistan Football Federation and bans by FIFA, Butt was replaced as coach by Tanveer Ahmed in the advent of the 2021–22 Pakistan Premier League.

== Honours ==
=== Player ===
==== Pakistan ====
- South Asian Games:
  - Winners (1): 1989

==== WAPDA ====
- National Football Championship:
  - Winners (3): 1983, 1991, 2001

=== Manager ===
==== WAPDA ====
- Pakistan Premier League:
  - Winners (4): 2004–05, 2007–08, 2008–09, 2010–11
