= Higher Education Commission FC =

Pakistani football club

- Full name: Higher Education Commission Football Club
- Short name: HEC
- Owner: Higher Education Commission

Higher Education Commission FC, previously known as University Grants Commission, serves as the football section of Higher Education Commission. The team consists of football players among Pakistan's university students. The club played in the National Football Championship, and also featured in the PFF League. It also regularly plays in other nationwide football tournaments including the National Games and National Challenge Cup.

== History ==
At the 1999 National Football Championship, the University Grants Commission team failed to advance past the H Group, comprising Allied Bank and Sindh Reds.

At the 2001 National Football Championship, the team qualified from the group stage but fell in the round of 16 against KRL.

In 2002 after institutional reforms, University Grants Commission changed its name to Higher Education Commission. At the 2003 National Football Championship, the team failed to qualify from the group stage.

From 2004 till 2014, the team played at the second tier PFF League, ending up unsuccessful in all their campaigns to achieve the promotion to the Pakistan Premier League.

Following the domestic football revamp in the country in 2023, departmental clubs including Higher Education Commission remained competing in the National Football Challenge Cup, a competition the team already participated in before. At the 2023–24 National Football Challenge Cup, the team ended fourth, after losing against Pakistan Army in the third place match, and causing several upset wins against big teams such as KRL.
