= 1993–94 National A-Division Football Championship =

National A-Division Football Championship
- Season: 1993–94
- Dates: 17 August 1993 – 9 February 1994
- Champions: Pakistan Army
- Relegated: Pakistan Air Force

The 1993–94 National A-Division Football Championship, known as 1993–94 National Lifebuoy A-Division Football Championship due to sponsorship reasons, was the 41st edition of the National Football Championship, Pakistan's premier domestic football competition. It was played from 17 August 1993 to 9 February 1994 across several venues in Quetta, Lahore, Faisalabad, Rawalpindi, Peshawar and Karachi. This was the second time a national level league format was held in Pakistan, since the previous knockout format since 1948.

== Overview ==
Under the General Secretary of the Pakistan Football Federation Hafiz Salman Butt, the National Football Championship was structured on a proper league-style basis and spread over a number of months. The top division, named as National Lifebuoy A-Division Football Championship, operated alongside a system of promotion and relegation with the second-tier National Lifebuoy B-Division Football Championship. Butt managed to get a three-year sponsorship deal with Lifebuoy Soap, with amounts of 35 million PKR spent in the organisations of the seasons and televised through the country.

This was the second edition of the league level format after the 1992–93 season. Crescent Textile Mills were promoted after winning the 1992 National B-Division Football Championship. The teams were reduced to 8 compared to 9 teams from the previous season, and 84 matches were played, all the teams played against each other thrice, twice at home and away basis and one neutral venue in Quetta. Pakistan Army won the league title, and Pakistan Air Force was relegated to the National B-Division Football Championship.

== Final standings ==
Pos	Team	Pld	W	D	L	GF	GA	GD	Pts	Qualification or relegation
1	Pakistan Army (C)	21	14	5	2	34	9	+25	33	
2	WAPDA	21	13	4	4	37	8	+29	30	
3	Crescent Textile Mills	21	10	4	7	26	24	+2	24	
4	Habib Bank	21	10	3	8	24	25	−1	23	
5	Pakistan Railways	21	6	7	8	20	22	−2	19	
6	Wohaib	21	4	7	10	14	27	−13	15	
7	Pakistan Airlines	21	2	9	10	11	30	−19	13	
8	Pakistan Air Force (R)	21	2	7	12	16	37	−21	11	Relegation to National B-Division Football Championship

Source: RSSSF
(C) Champions; (R) Relegated
