= 1985 National Football Championship (Pakistan) =

Tournament details
- Country: Pakistan
- Venue(s): Sadiq Shaheed Stadium, Quetta, Balochistan, Pakistan
- Dates: 21 July 1985 – 16 September 1985

Final positions
- Champions: Quetta Division
- Runners-up: Pakistan International Airlines

The 1985 National Football Championship was the 33rd edition of the National Football Championship, Pakistan's premier domestic football competition. The qualifying round started on 21 July, and the final round was held at Sadiq Shaheed Stadium, Quetta, from 6 to 16 September 1985.

== Overview ==
The final round of the 1985 National Football Championship was held at Quetta.

Quetta Division defeated Peshawar Division 3–1 in the semifinal on 13 September 1985. Quetta scored the lead through right-winger Ishaque on a pass from left-in Lala Amin. Centre forward Mohammad Ali scored the second goal and two minutes later the third goal. Peshawar reduced the margin through right-in Jehanzeb.

In the second semi-final, PIA recorded a 3–2 victory over Karachi Reds, who soon after the start, gained the lead through inside-left Rashid, but PIA scored the equaliser through centre-forward Naushad. PIA further scored via Mahmood Anwar, and later through Muhammad Idrees before the half time. Karachi Reds reduced the margin in the second half through Din Mohammad.

The Quetta Division regained the title after 26 years when they defeated PIA by 2–1 in the final. In the 23rd minute, PIA gained the lead through Saleem off a pass from Ghulam Sarwar Teddy. In the 10th minute of second half, Abdul Wahid levelled the score off a pass from captain Mohammad Ali. Just before full time, Karim scored the match winning goal for Quetta. Karachi Division defeated Peshawar Division on penalty kick after playing 1–1 draw to win the third place.

== Group stage ==
=== Group A ===
| Pos | Team | Pld | W | D | L | GF | GA | GD | Pts | Qualification |
|---|---|---|---|---|---|---|---|---|---|---|
| 1 | Quetta Division | 3 | 3 | 0 | 0 | 4 | 1 | +3 | 6 | Qualified for knockout stage |
| 2 | Karachi Red | 3 | 2 | 0 | 1 | 4 | 2 | +2 | 4 | Qualified for knockout stage |
| 3 | Rawalpindi Division | 3 | 1 | 0 | 2 | 1 | 3 | −2 | 2 | |
| 4 | Pakistan Air Force | 3 | 0 | 0 | 3 | 0 | 3 | −3 | 0 | |

Source: RSSSF

=== Group B ===
| Pos | Team | Pld | W | D | L | GF | GA | GD | Pts | Qualification |
|---|---|---|---|---|---|---|---|---|---|---|
| 1 | Pakistan International Airlines | 3 | 2 | 1 | 0 | 8 | 1 | +7 | 5 | Qualified for knockout stage |
| 2 | Peshawar Division | 3 | 2 | 0 | 1 | 7 | 9 | −2 | 4 | Qualified for knockout stage |
| 3 | Qalat Division | 3 | 1 | 1 | 1 | 2 | 2 | 0 | 3 | |
| 4 | Multan Division | 3 | 0 | 0 | 3 | 3 | 8 | −5 | 0 | |

Source: RSSSF

== Knockout stage ==
=== Semi-finals ===
13 September 1985

| Quetta Division | 3–1 | Peshawar Division |
|---|---|---|
| Ishaque; Mohammad Ali | Report | Jehanzeb |

| Pakistan International Airlines | 3–2 | Karachi Red |
|---|---|---|
| Naushad; Anwar; Idrees 42' | Report | Rashid; Din Mohammad |

=== Third place match ===
| Karachi Red | 1–1 | Peshawar Division |
|---|---|---|
| | Report |
Penalties
| | 3–2 |

=== Final ===
16 September 1985

| Quetta Division | 2–1 | Pakistan International Airlines |
|---|---|---|
| Abdul Wahid 55'; Karim | Report | Saleem 23' |
