= 1981 National Football Championship (Pakistan) =

Tournament details
- Country: Pakistan
- Venue(s): Peshawar Stadium, Peshawar
- Dates: 10 April 1981 – 4 May 1981

Final positions
- Champions: Pakistan Airlines
- Runners-up: Pakistan Air Force

The 1981 National Football Championship was the 29th edition of the National Football Championship, Pakistan's premier domestic football competition. It was played from 10 April to 4 May 1981.

== Overview ==
=== Group stage ===
The 1981 National Football Championship was inaugurated by the NWFP Governor, Fazle Haq, on 11 April 1981 at the Peshawar Stadium. The ceremony marked the revival of football activity in Pakistan after a stalemate of five years.

A total of 22 teams took part in the championship. In one group, Pakistan Airlines and Pakistan Air Force qualified for the semi finals as the top two teams, while Pakistan Railways and Habib Bank qualified from the other group.

=== Knockout stage ===
The first semifinal was played between Pakistan Airlines and Pakistan Railways. Pakistan Airlines entered the final with a win over Railways, left-winger Tariq was the scorer for PIA. In the other semifinal between Pakistan Air Force and Habib Bank, Pakistan Air Force won by a solitary goal.

The final was played on 4 May 1981. Pakistan Airlines defeated Pakistan Air Force 4–3 on penalty kicks after playing a 2–2 draw in the scheduled time. Pakistan Air Force took the lead through inside-right Yousaf in the 11th minute, while winger Mubarak Shah doubled the margin. Inside-left Muhammad Idrees scored both goals for Pakistan Airlines, the first three minutes before the half time and the second in the 24th minute of the second half. This led to the penalty shootout and Pakistan Airlines defeated Pakistan Air Force by converting four of the five kicks to three of the losing Pakistan Air Force. President Zia-ul-Haq gave away the prizes after watching the final for about 30 minutes.

== Group stage ==
A total of 22 teams took part in the championship.

=== Group A ===
Pakistan Airlines and Pakistan Air Force advanced.

=== Group B ===
Pakistan Railways and Habib Bank advanced.

== Knockout stage ==
=== Semi-finals ===
| Pakistan Airlines | 1–0 | Pakistan Railways |
|---|---|---|
| Tariq |

| Pakistan Air Force | 1–0 | Habib Bank |

=== Final ===
4 May 1981

| Pakistan Airlines | 2–2 | Pakistan Air Force |
|---|---|---|
| Idrees 41', 69' | | Yousaf 11'; Mubarak Shah |
Penalties
| | 4–3 |
