= Amir Gul Chhutto =

Pakistani footballer

Amir Gul
Personal information
- Full name: Amir Gul Chhutto
- Date of birth: 15 November 1986 (age 39)
- Place of birth: Toba Tek Singh, Pakistan
- Height: 1.72 m (5 ft 7 1/2 in)
- Position: Goalkeeper

Senior career*
Years	Team	Apps	(Gls)
2003–2016	National Bank	196	(0)
Total		196	(0)

International career
2010–2013	Pakistan U23	3	(0)
2009–2011	Pakistan	8	(0)
Medal record
National Bank
Runner-up	National Challenge Cup	2016
- * Club domestic league appearances and goals

Amir Gul Chhutto (born 15 November 1986) is a Pakistani former footballer who played as a goalkeeper for National Bank from 2003 to 2016.

== International career ==
He made his international debut against Malaysia in 2008 and competitive debut on 4 April 2009 against Chinese Taipei in 2010 AFC Challenge Cup qualifications.

== Career statistics ==
=== International ===
Appearances and goals by year and competition
National team	Year	Apps	Goals
Pakistan	2009	5	0
Pakistan	2011	3	0
Total		8	0

== Honours ==
=== National Bank ===
- National Football Challenge Cup: 2013
