= Peshawar Division football team =

Peshawar Division
- Full name: Peshawar Division football team
- Founded: 1961
- Ground: Various
- Owner: Peshawar Division Football Association
- League: National Football Championship

The Peshawar Division football team is a Pakistani football team representing Peshawar Division in regional football competitions. The team has competed at the National Football Championship on several occasions, the premier football competition of Pakistan from 1948 till 2003.

== History ==
In 1961, under Pakistan Football Federation newly elected president Asghar Khan, the National Football Championship structure in Pakistan transitioned from provincial to divisional-based teams. The team was hence formed along with the Peshawar Division Football Association.

On 23 November 1966, the team played an exhibition match against visiting Soviet club Alga, ending in a 0–3 defeat for Peshawar.

The team notably won the National Football Championship in 1968, defeating Lahore Division by 3–2 in the final. In the 1969–70 edition, the team lost to Chittagong Division in the final.

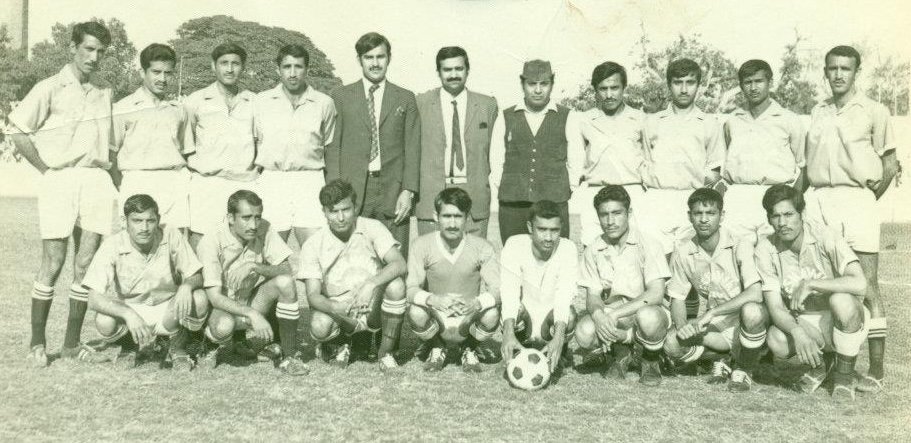
Peshawar Division during the 1973 National Football Championship

The team took part in the 1970 Aga Khan Gold Cup, losing to Indonesian side Persebaya Surabaya in the semifinals.

In 1972, the team under the label Peshawar White, ended runner-ups after losing against Pakistan Airlines.

== Honours ==
- National Football Championship
  - Winners (1): 1968
  - Runners-up (2): 1969–70, 1972
