= Gohar Zaman =

Pakistani manager and former footballer

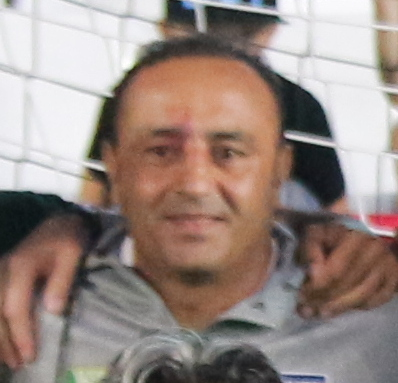
- Zaman in 2019

Personal information
- Full name: Gohar Zaman
- Date of birth: 15 December 1979 (age 46)
- Place of birth: Peshawar, Pakistan
- Position: Forward

Youth career
- Frontiers Scouts

Senior career*
Years	Team	Apps	(Gls)
1994	Youth League FC		
1994	WAPDA		
1995–2002	Allied Bank		

International career
2002	Pakistan U23		
1996–2002	Pakistan	13	(5)

Managerial career
- 2007–2012: Pakistan (assistant)
- 2009: Pakistan U20
- 2019–2021: Pakistan (assistant)
- 2025–: Pakistan U23 (assistant)
- * Club domestic league appearances and goals

Gohar Zaman (born 15 December 1979) is a Pakistani football manager and former footballer who played as a forward.

== Early life ==
Zaman was born on 15 December 1979 in Faqeerabad, Peshawar. He graduated with Master of Arts in Urdu literature at the Peshawar University. Zaman started playing football in his school days, joining Frontiers Scouts club at the age of 10 in 1989.

== Club career ==
In 1994, Zaman played the Lifebuoy Trophy with Abbottabad based Youth League FC, where his team clinched the title. Following his performance, he was scouted and included in WAPDA.

Zaman joined National Football Championship departmental side Allied Bank in 1995, winning the first title in 1997, and then consecutively in 1999 and 2000. He also won the National Football Challenge Cup four times with Allied Bank, winning in 1996, 1998, 1999 and 2002. Zaman's career came to an end in 2002, when Allied Bank abolished their football team.

== International career ==
In 1995, Zaman appeared for Pakistan under-23 team in the 1996 Summer Olympics qualifiers. He later featured for the Pakistan senior team in the 1996 AFC Asian Cup qualification. After the 1999 South Asian Games he played at the next 2000 AFC Asian Cup qualification.

During the 2002 World Cup qualifiers he became the only Pakistani footballer to score a hat-trick in a World Cup match. He completed the hat-trick within 40 minutes against Sri Lanka in a 3–3 draw.

Zaman also represented Pakistan in the 2002 Asian games in Busan.

== Managerial career ==
Following his retirement, Zaman completed AFC "C" and "B" Certificate Football Coaching courses at Lahore in 2002 and 2006 respectively. Later on, he attended several FIFA Special Coaching Courses under Jimmy Shoulder, Erich Rutemöller, Klaus Stark and George Kottan.

In 2006, Zaman joined the coaching staff of the Pakistan under-14 team. Zaman was appointed as the assistant manager of the Pakistan national football team in 2007. In 2009, he was appointed as head coach of the Pakistan national under-19 football team for the 2010 AFC U-19 Championship qualification in Iran.

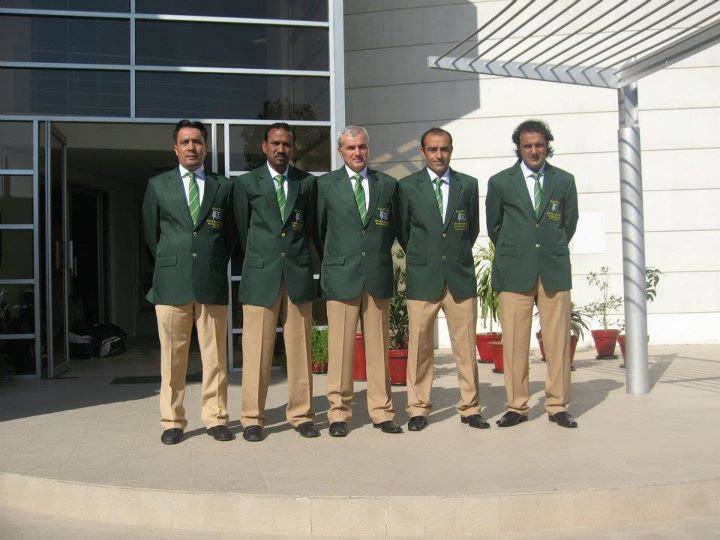
Zaman (second to left) as assistant manager of the Pakistan national team in 2011

In 2012, Gohar was dismissed from his position as assistant manager under the leadership of the Faisal Saleh Hayat, due to allegations of irresponsibility made by the Pakistan Football Federation (PFF). However, it was later discovered that the real reason for his dismissal was his refusal to hand over the salary he had received from the Asian Football Confederation's Aid-27 program to the PFF. Over the years, the PFF had been consistently reclaiming the salaries of coaches, received from the Asian football governing body, under the pretense of these funds being "donations" intended to support Pakistan football.

Following the expulsion of Hayat by FIFA, he was assigned the assistant role again in 2019, for a tour in Malaysia under head coach Tariq Lutfi.

Zaman coached WSTC at the 2023–24 PFF National Challenge Cup. In 2025, he was appointed assistant coach of the Pakistan national under-23 team under Nolberto Solano for the 2026 AFC U-23 Asian Cup qualifiers.

== Career statistics ==
=== International ===
Appearances and goals by national team and year
National team	Year	Apps	Goals
Pakistan	1996	2	0
Pakistan	1999	2	2
Pakistan	2001	6	3
Pakistan	2002	3	0
Total		13	5

Scores and results list Pakistan's goal tally first, score column indicates score after each Zaman goal.

List of international goals scored by Gohar Zaman
No.	Date	Venue	Opponent	Score	Result	Competition
1	26 September 1999	Dasharath Rangasala Stadium, Kathmandu, Nepal	India	1–5	2–5	1999 South Asian Games
2	30 September 1999	Dasharath Rangasala Stadium, Kathmandu, Nepal	Nepal	1–1	1–3	1999 South Asian Games
3	17 May 2001	Beirut Municipal Stadium, Beirut, Lebanon	Sri Lanka	1–2	3–3	2002 AFC FIFA World Cup qualification
4	17 May 2001	Beirut Municipal Stadium, Beirut, Lebanon	Sri Lanka	2–2	3–3	2002 AFC FIFA World Cup qualification
5	17 May 2001	Beirut Municipal Stadium, Beirut, Lebanon	Sri Lanka	3–3	3–3	2002 AFC FIFA World Cup qualification

== Honours ==
Allied Bank

- National Football Championship: 1997(1), 1999, 2000
- Pakistan National Football Challenge Cup: 1996, 1998, 1999, 2002

== See also ==
- List of Pakistan national football team hat-tricks
