= Khuda Bakhsh (footballer) =

Pakistani footballer

Personal information
- Full name: Khuda Bakhsh
- Date of birth: 15 June 1980 (age 46)
- Place of birth: Jacobabad, Pakistan
- Height: 1.70 m (5 ft 7 in)
- Position: Forward

Senior career*
Years	Team	Apps	(Gls)
1997–1999	Sindh Government Press		
1999–2000	Allied Bank		
2001–2011	WAPDA		

International career
1999–2009	Pakistan	5	(0)
- * Club domestic league appearances and goals

Khuda Bakhsh (born 15 June 1980) is a Pakistani former footballer who played as a forward.

== Early life ==
Bakhsh was born on 15 June 1980 in Jacobabad, in the Sindh province of Pakistan. He started his football career at school level at the age of ten with Ghazi Abbas Football Club, and later joined the Shaheed Abdul Rehman Football Club.

== Club career ==
=== Allied Bank: 1999–2000 ===
After first representing the Sindh Government Press team, Bakhsh moved to Allied Bank Limited (ABL) in 1999. He scored his first goal for the club in the finals of the 1999 National Football Challenge Cup, scoring the equaliser against Khan Research Laboratories. Bakhsh won his first silverware when ABL defeated Khan Research Laboratories 5–4 on penalties after the game ended 1–1 after extra-time.

In the 2000 National Football Championship, Bakhsh scored three goals for ABL, which included a brace against Pakistan Police in a 6–1 victory, scoring goals in 57th and 73rd minutes. Bakhsh's third goal came against Punjab Reds, breaking the deadlock in the 74th minute. Bakhsh won his first league title as ABL defeated Habib Bank 1–0 in the finals.

=== WAPDA: 2001–2011 ===
Bakhsh joined WAPDA before the start of the 2001 season, Bakhsh formed the attacking duo with Arif Mehmood. Bakhsh with Mehmood scored eight goals in 6 matches as WAPDA went on to win their third national league. Bakhsh scored three goals in the league, a brace against NWFP Green in group stage and an equaliser against Khan Research Laboratories in the finals.

Bakhsh won his third consecutive league title in 2002, when WAPDA won the league again, although Bakhsh only scored one goal during the season, against Pakistan Machine Tool Factory in the quarter-finals of 2002 National Football Challenge Cup.

In 2003 National Football Championship, Bakhsh ended season with five goals in seven matches as Bakhsh and WAPDA won their fourth league title, (Bakhsh won in 1999 and 2000 with Allied Bank). Bakhsh scored a brace against NWFP Red and one against Sui Southern Gas in a 3–0 and 2–1 win respectively. Bakhsh scored in 5th minutes in quarter-finals against Pakistan Telecommunication on 14 May 2003. On 16 May 2003, Bakhsh scored the opening goal against Habib Bank in the semi-finals as WAPDA won the game 4–1. Two days later, on 18 May 2003, WAPDA defeated Pakistan Army 4–2 on penalties when the game ended 0–0 after extra-time. Bakhsh converted the opening penalty in the shoot-out. Bakhsh scored two goals in 2003 National Football Challenge Cup as WAPDA were knocked out in quarter-finals by Pakistan Navy.

In 2004–05, Bakhsh scored both goals in the opening game against his former club Allied Bank, scoring on 35th and 70th minutes. On 2 June 2004, Bakhsh scored a goal in a 1–1 draw against Panther Club. Two days later in reverse fixture, Bakhsh scored a brace as WAPDA defeated Panther Club 4–0. On 12 June, Bakhsh scored the opening goal in 4–0 victory over Wohaib. One month later on 17 July, WAPDA defeated Mardan Football Club 10–0, as the attacking duo Bakhsh and Mehmood scored six goals (Bakhsh scored 2 and Mehmood scored 4). Bakhsh didn't scored any goals until 13 August when he scored the lone goal of the match as WAPDA defeated Habib Bank 1–0. A month later, on 12 September, Bakhsh scored his first hat-trick against Afghan Chaman, WAPDA won the game 6–0, with attacking partner Mehmood scoring a hat-trick as well. Bakhsh won his fourth consecutive league, as WAPDA finished first on goal difference. Bakhsh scored 16 goals in 30 matches, as he along with Mehmood scored a total of 36 goals in 30 matches.

In 2005–06 league Bakhsh scored only five goals in 22 matches, as WAPDA finished second to Pakistan Army. Bakhsh scored two goals in 2005 National Football Challenge Cup, including a goal in finals against Pakistan Telecommunication, although WAPDA lost the finals 2–1.

Bakhsh missed the whole 2006–07 season due to a knee injury.

Bakhsh returned from injury in 2007–08, opening a brace in the opening game against Pakistan Television, WAPDA won the game 3–0. His third goal of the season came against Khan Research Laboratories in a 3–1. Bakhsh went on to score three more goals to finish the season with six goals in 14 appearances. Bakhsh won his sixth league title as WAPDA defeated Pakistan Army on the final match day to secure the title by 1 point. Bakhsh scored five goals in the 2008–09 season, winning his seventh league in total and third with WAPDA. In 2009–10 Bakhsh scored only two goals in 20 appearances, his worst scoring record. At his last season in the 2010–11 Pakistan Premier League, his crucial goals helped WAPDA win the title.

== International career ==
Bakhsh earned his first international cap at the 1999 South Asian Games held in Nepal. He played his last international match in a 7–0 victory against Bhutan in the 2009 SAFF Championship.

== Honours ==
Allied Bank

- National Football Championship: 1999, 2000
- National Football Challenge Cup: 1999

WAPDA

- National Football Championship: 2000–01, 2001–02
- Pakistan Premier League: 2004–05, 2007–08, 2008–09, 2010–11
