= Crescent Textile Mills FC =

Crescent Textile Mills
- Full name: Crescent Textile Mills Football Club
- Short name: CTM
- Owner: Crescent Textile Mills Ltd.

Crescent Textile Mills Football Club (abbreviated CTM) served as the football section of Crescent Textile Mills Ltd, the Faisalabad-based textile manufacturer. The team emerged in the mid-1980s and quickly became one of Pakistan’s leading departmental sides, winning the National Football Championship twice (1987, 1994). It also represented Pakistan in the Asian Club Championship on two occasions, in 1988–89 and 1995.

== History ==
=== Emergence (1980s) ===
The team was formed as representative of Crescent Textile Mills Ltd, the Faisalabad-based textile manufacturer in national football competitions. The company recruited local football organiser Allah Dita Awan as team manager and talent-hunter, and recruited players primarily from Faisalabad and surrounding Punjab districts. In 1987 CTM won the National Football Championship in Quetta, beating Karachi Port Trust in the final. (Note: RSSSF records possibly conflate tournaments: the 1987 edition may have been part of the National Football Championship, while the 1992, 1993, and 1994 editions likely corresponded to the National Lifebuoy B-Division Championship, which at the time functioned as the second tier of the league system under promotion and relegation. "Pakistan - List of Champions". www.rsssf.org.)

==== Asian debut (1988–89) ====
By virtue of the 1987 championship CTM represented Pakistan in the 1988–89 Asian Club Championship. The qualifying group was staged at Salt Lake Stadium, Kolkata. CTM lost to Mohun Bagan (India) 8–0, and Fanja (Oman) 8–1, but registered a 2–1 win over Kathmandu City (Nepal), finishing third in the group and failing to advance.

=== Consolidation and second national trophy (1990s) ===
CTM remained a regular entrant in the National Football Championship through the 1990s. When the PFF experimented with a proper league pyramid under the Lifebuoy sponsorship (1992–94), Crescent Textile Mills won the second tier 1992 National B-Division Football Championship, defeating Markers Club of Quetta in Lahore.

The team’s second national title came in 1994, when CTM again won the National Football Championship, this time ahead of WAPDA.

==== Return to Asia (1995–96) ====
As 1994 champions, CTM were nominated again for the 1995 Asian Club Championship. At home in Faisalabad they beat Sri Lanka’s Saunders SC 2–1 in the first round of the qualifying stage but did not go beyond the second round against Verdy Kawasaki.

=== Late period and decline (2000–2004) ===
In the early 2000s, the team continued to participate in national football competitions. However when in May 2004 the PFF abolished the old national championship and President’s Cup in order to start a national league, the team failed to make the cut as debut entrant.

== Performance in AFC competitions ==
Win Draw Loss

Season	Competition	Round	Club	First leg	Second leg	Aggregate
1988–89	Asian Club Championship	Qualifying Stage	(India) Mohun Bagan	0–8		
1988–89	Asian Club Championship	Qualifying Stage	(Oman) Fanja	1–8		
1988–89	Asian Club Championship	Qualifying Stage	(Nepal) Kathmandu SC	2–1		
1995	Asian Club Championship	Qualifying Stage	(Sri Lanka) Saunders SC	2–1	3–0^{1}	5–1
1995	Asian Club Championship	Qualifying Stage	(Japan) Verdy Kawasaki	1–9	0–3^{2}	1–12

^{1} Saunders withdrew in 2nd leg, default 3–0 to Crescent Mills.

^{2} Crescent withdrew in 2nd leg, default 3–0 to Verdy Kawasaki.

== Honours ==
=== Domestic ===
- National Football Championship
  - Winners (2): 1987, 1994
- National B-Division Football Championship
  - Winners (1): 1992
