= Pakistan International Airlines FC =

Pakistani football club

Pakistan Airlines
- Full name: Pakistan Airlines Football Club
- Nickname: The Airliners
- Short name: PIA
- Founded: 1958; 68 years ago
- Dissolved: 2021; 5 years ago
- Ground: PIA Football Ground, KDA Scheme I, Karsaz, Karachi
- Owner: Pakistan International Airlines
Home colours	Away colours

Pakistan International Airlines Football Club, abbreviated as PIA FC, served as the football section of Pakistan International Airlines. Based in Karachi, Sindh, the club used to compete in the National Football Championship and Pakistan Premier League.

The club is the most successful club in Pakistan in terms of champions titles, winning nine National Football Championship titles, with their first title in 1971 and their last title win in the 1998–99 season.

== History ==
=== Early years (1958–1960s) ===
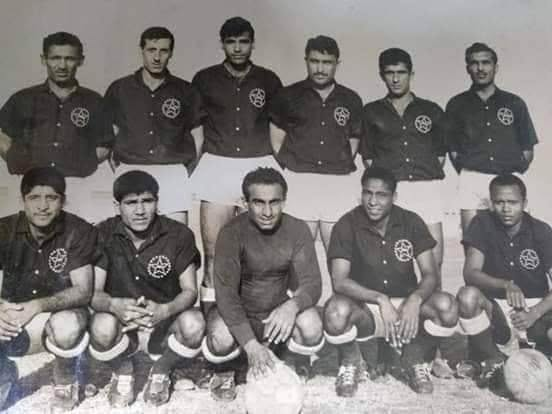
The PIA football team pictured in 1966.

The Pakistan International Airlines football team was established shortly after the formation of PIA Sports Board in 1958, to represent Pakistan International Airlines in football competitions.

In September 1960, the team participated in the 1960 Aga Khan Gold Cup in Dhaka.

=== National Football Championship dominance (1971–1991) ===
The team participated in the 1970 Aga Khan Gold Cup. After passing through the qualifying stage, the team ended last in the group A of the round robin league comprising Persebaya Surabaya, Dhaka Mohammedan, and Dhaka Wanderers.

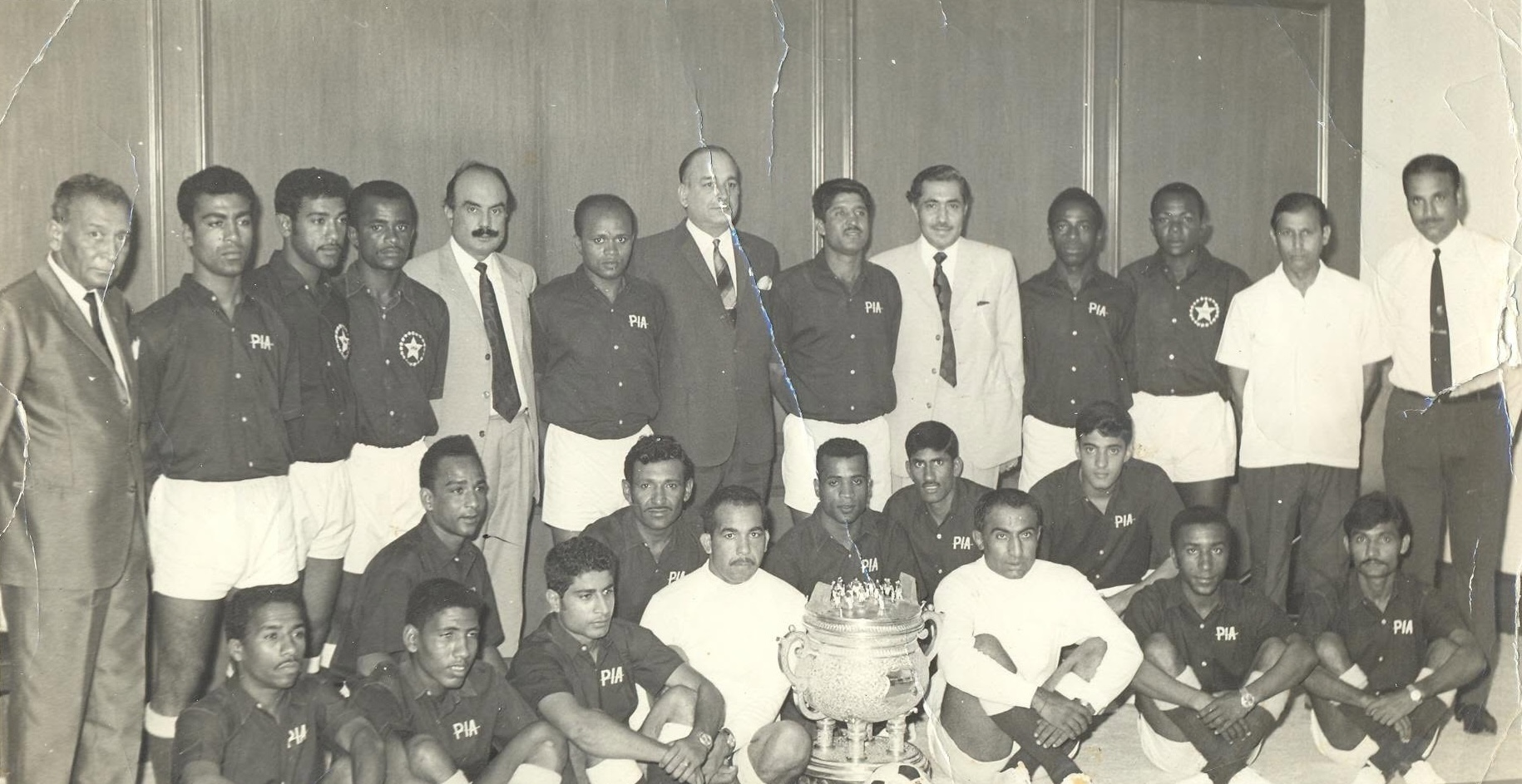
1971 All-Pakistan Quaid-e-Azam Football League Tournament winning PIA team

From the 1970s until the 1990s, the club dominated the National Football Championship. Their first National Football Championship title came in May 1971, when they defeated Karachi Division in the final. The next month, the team won the All-Pakistan Quaid-e-Azam Football League Tournament, defeating Pakistan Western Railway 7–1, with striker Ali Nawaz Baloch scoring six goals, along with a goal from Ashraf.

The club successfully defended their National Football Championship title in 1972 when they held off Peshawar White.

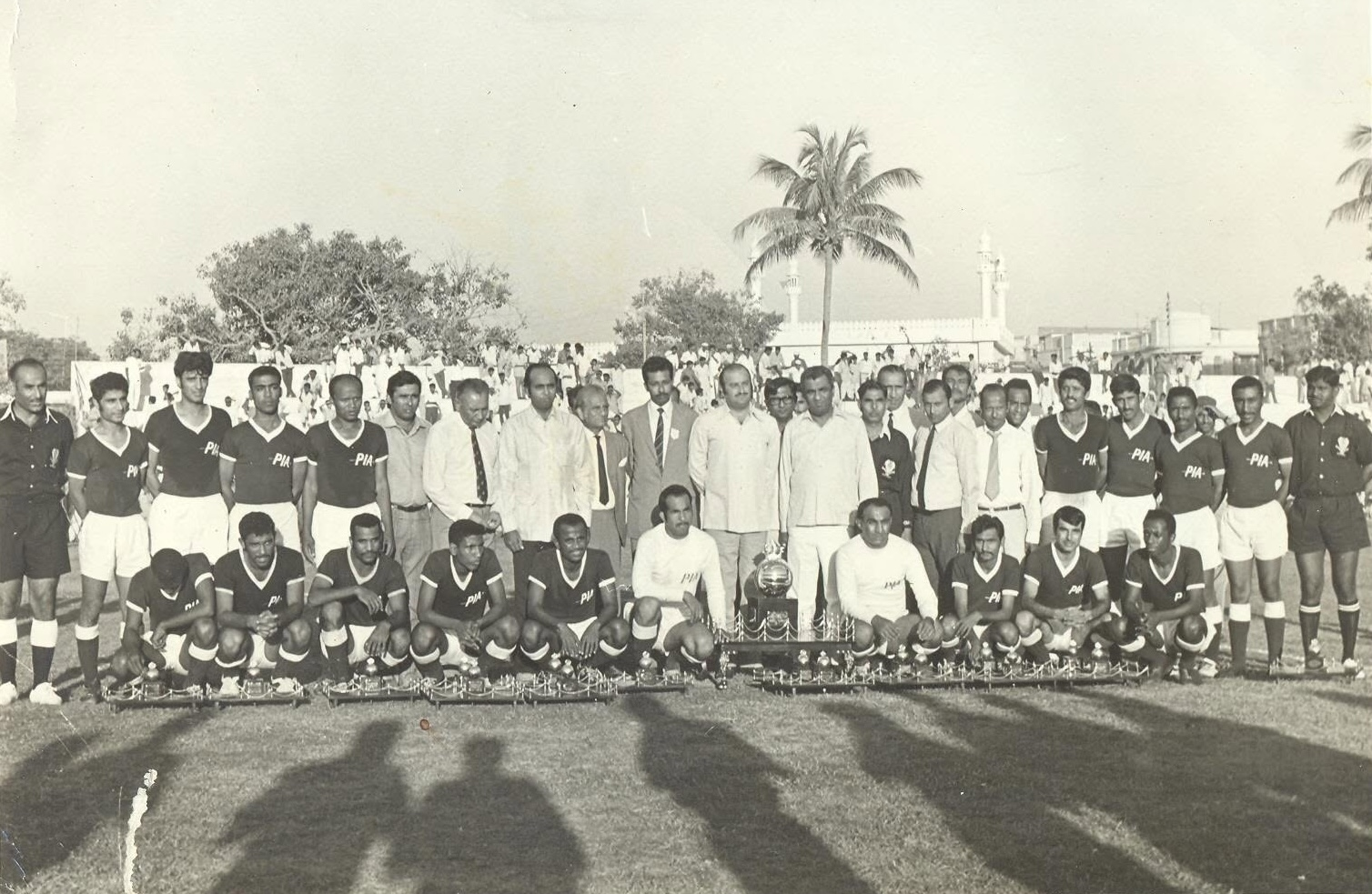
PIA football team with a trophy, c. 1972–1974

Their third National Football Championship title came in the first of the two 1975 seasons, defeating provincial side Punjab A. In July 1975, the Hebei provincial team from China visited Pakistan playing several matches across the country. PIA drew the match against the visitors in Rawalpindi.

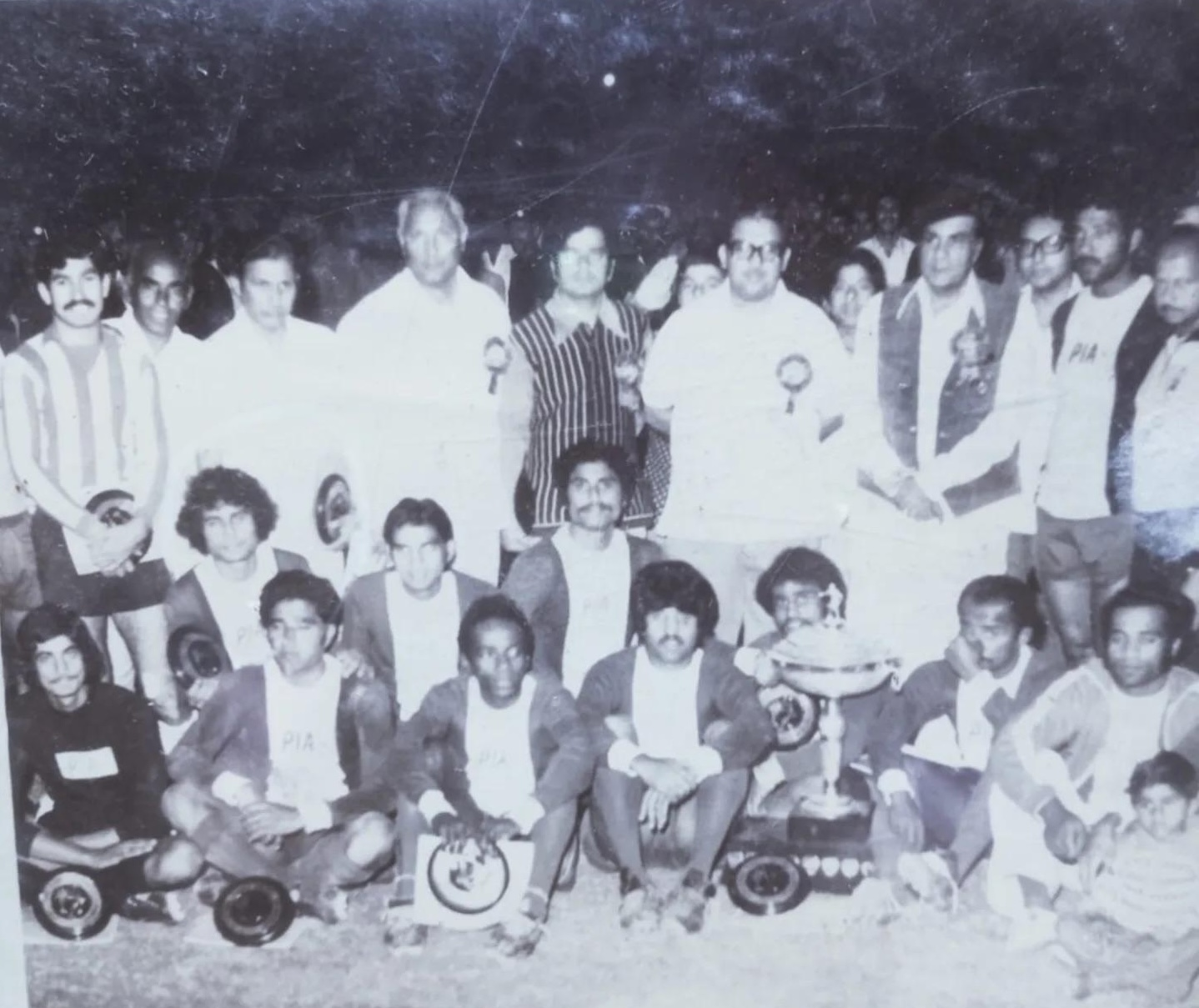
1976 National Football Championship winning PIA team

In 1976 they retained their National Football Championship title, holding off a challenge from Pakistan Railways. At the end of the year, an 18-member PIA team captained by Abdul Jabbar, toured Abu Dhabi for seven days from 16 December 1976 and played two exhibition matches there.

In 1977, former Pakistan national team coach Muhammad Amin was appointed head coach of Pakistan Airlines by Air Marshall Nur Khan, bringing new players such as Naeem Gul, Shamim Khan, Muhammad Naqi Khan, Afzal Qasim, Abdul Wahid Sr., and Iftikhar Gaga. The PIA team left for Dacca, Bangladesh on 6 December 1977 to play in the Aga Khan Gold Cup.

The next year, the team went on to win the 1978 National Football Championship title defeating Sindh Red in the final by a lone goal by Afzal Qasim. In February 1978, the team participated at the Habib Bank Gold Cup tournament in Karachi. The finals were played between KMC and PIA at the KMC Stadium on 10 February 1978. PIA fell to KMC in the final by two goals to nil. On 9 March 1978, the team played against the Berlin University football team from Germany at the KMC Stadium. The Germans ultimately won the match by three goals to one.

PIA defeated Karachi Port Trust by 2–1 in the All-Pakistan KMC Silver Shield final on 20 November 1979 at KMC Stadium, Karachi. Centre-forward Ayub scored for KPT after a defensive error by PIA goalkeeper Dawood Durrani. PIA later equalised through inside-right Abdul Wahid Sr., who scored after a quick pass from inside-left Muhammad Idrees. PIA then took the lead in the 20th minute when Tariq headed in a lob from Abdul Wahid Sr.

PIA defeated Pakistan Air Force in the 1981 National Football Championship to win their sixth title. In December 1981, the team toured Bangladesh to take part in the 1981–82 Aga Khan Gold Cup.

In 1982, the team was also proposed by the national football federation to explore the possibility of organizing a World Inter-Airlines Football Tournament, modeled after the PIA Champions Trophy. If PIA agreed, the federation would then seek approval from the Asian Football Confederation and the International Football Federation to hold the tournament, although it seemingly failed to materialise. In December 1982, the team took part in the 1982–83 DCM Trophy in India.

==== 1985–86 Asian Club Championship ====
After winning the 1984 Inter-Provincial Championship, PIA became Pakistan's first representative in Asian club football, and was placed in a qualifying group for the 1985–86 Asian Club Championship where it finished in 4th place out of 6 teams.

==== 1990–91 Asian Club Championship ====
PIA had to wait eight years for their next National Football Championship title win in 1989, defeating Sindh Government Press. At the 1990–91 Asian Club Championship, the team faced Al-Nasr SC from Oman and Ranipokhari Corner Team from Nepal at the Ayub National Stadium in Quetta. In 17 July, the team played to a goalless draw against the Omani side. Despite both teams finishing with three points, Oman advanced to the next round based on a superior goal difference. PIA, the tournament's sponsor, had a solid chance of qualifying for the second round but failed to capitalize on their opportunities despite controlling much of the match. In the 28th minute, Naushad Baloch made a threatening run, though it did not result in a goal. He was also cautioned with a yellow card for charging into the opposing goalkeeper. The best opportunity for PIA came when Baloch's header from a cross by Majeed sailed over the bar. Al-Nasr responded with a dangerous attack, and Salim Juman found the net, but the goal was ruled offside by Bahraini linesman Matal Al Mahlood. Just before halftime, Mukhtar Ali saved a certain goal with an acrobatic overhead kick after PIA goalkeeper Jamshed Rana had been beaten. In the second half, PIA dominated early on. Al-Nasr, focused more on securing a draw, made two substitutions, but were unable to score. Late in the game, PIA received two more yellow cards from Sri Lankan referee Mohsin Arif due to player disputes. In the final minutes, Salah Musyiah launched a powerful shot at the PIA goal, but Jamshed Rana was able to punch it over the bar.

In September 1991, PIA participated in the TAAN (Trekking Agencies Association of Nepal) Cup tournament, held in Kathmandhu, Nepal. The team finished in third place, with PIA player Fida Ur Rehman ending as top goal-scorer with 6 goals.

In May 1992, PIA was selected to host the inaugural SAARC Airlines Football Tournament, which was scheduled to be held in Karachi in June and contested by airline football teams from SAARC member states. It is unclear whether the tournament ultimately took place.

In the season of 1992–93, PIA won their eighth national title, when they defeated Pakistan Army in the Lifebuoy Soap sponsored league structured National Football Championship.

In the 1990s, the team also participated in the Rupak Memorial International Football Tournament in Nepal, a competition held in memory of PIA Flight 268 victim and former Nepal international footballer Rupak Raj Sharma. The tournament was held in two editions, in 1993 and 1995.

=== Steady decline (1997–2019) ===
Pakistan Airlines lost their dominance until the end of the 1990s, winning their last of 9 national championships in 1997, fighting off tough competition from Allied Bank in the final. The team also had qualified for the Asian Cup Winners' Cup in the 1992–93 and 1998–99 editions, but withdrew both times.

==== Disbandment and inactivity (2004–2007) ====
PIA did not enter the newly formed Pakistan Premier League from 2004 to 2006 as after the 2003 President PFF Cup held in Quetta, the team was disbanded.

==== Pakistan Premier League era (2007–2019) ====
The club was added into 2007–08 Pakistan Premier League, as the league expanded from 12 to 14 teams. In their first season, the club finished at sixth position. The club competed in 2008 National Football Challenge Cup but finished third in their group and failed to qualify.

In the 2008–09 season, the club dropped two places and finished eighth, although the club performed well in the 2009 National Football Challenge Cup, as they finished runners up to Khan Research Laboratories, losing 1–0 in the final. In 2011–12 Pakistan Premier League, the club recorded their biggest defeat when they lost 4–0 to Khan Research Laboratories at home.

The club finished their highest position in Pakistan Premier League when they finished fourth in the 2014–15 Pakistan Premier League and were runners-up in 2015 National Football Challenge Cup, losing again to Khan Research Laboratories. The team withdrew from the 2016 Pakistan Football Federation Cup due to internal crisis caused by the privatisation of the parental organisation.

In 2018–19 season, they were eliminated in 2018 National Football Challenge Cup group stages and withdrew from the 2018–19 Pakistan Premier League due to financial issues, and were relegated.

=== Disbandment ===
Financial difficulties at the airline subsequently affected its departmental sports operations. In 2021, several prominent players were leaving the airline under its voluntary separation scheme. PIA's sports teams had not formally been disbanded, but had stopped participating in major domestic competitions and were no longer recruiting new players.

The club was closed after the shutdown of departmental sports in Pakistan in September 2021.

== Stadium ==
PIA had a dedicated football ground in KDA Scheme I, Karsaz, Karachi.

For national-league home fixtures, however, PIA FC used several venues in Karachi approved by the Pakistan Football Federation, including Korangi Baloch Stadium and Shadab Football Ground.

== Rivalries ==
Pakistan International Airlines and Karachi Port Trust had a long lasting rivalry in Karachi football, with fixtures between the two teams described as meetings of arch-rivals.

== Performance in AFC competitions ==
Win Draw Loss

Season	Competition	Round	Club	First leg	Second leg	Aggregate
1985–86	Asian Club Championship	Qualifying Stage	(Bangladesh) Abahani Krira Chakra	0–3		
1985–86	Asian Club Championship	Qualifying Stage	(Maldives) Club Valencia	6–1		
1985–86	Asian Club Championship	Qualifying Stage	(India) East Bengal	0–2		
1985–86	Asian Club Championship	Qualifying Stage	(Sri Lanka) Saunders SC	2–2		
1985–86	Asian Club Championship	Qualifying Stage	(Nepal) New Road Team	0–0		
1990–91	Asian Club Championship	Qualifying Stage	(Nepal) Ranipokhari	1–0		
1990–91	Asian Club Championship	Qualifying Stage	(Oman) Al-Nasr	0–0		
1992–93	Asian Cup Winners' Cup	First Round	(Sri Lanka) York Sporting Club	w/o		
1998–99	Asian Cup Winners' Cup	First Round	(Hong Kong) Happy Valley	w/o		

== Honours ==
=== Domestic ===
- National Football Championship
  - Champions (9): 1971, 1972, 1975, 1976, 1978, 1981, 1989, 1992–93, 1997
- Inter-Provincial Championship
  - Winners (1): 1984
