= National Football Championship (Pakistan) =

- Organiser(s): Pakistan Football Federation
- Founded: 1948; 78 years ago
- Abolished: 2004; 22 years ago
- Region: Pakistan
- Related competitions: National Games; 2010 KPT-PFF Cup
- International cup: Asian Club Championship
- Most championships: Pakistan Airlines (9 titles)

The National Football Championship, known as National A-Division Football Championship between 1992 and 1994, was the men's highest level football competition from 1948 to 2003. Founded by the Pakistan Football Federation (PFF) in 1948, it was usually held as a knockout representative tournament, with teams fielded by provincial and divisional associations alongside departmental teams. Between 1992 and 1994, the competition briefly adopted a revamped league format, before reverting to knockouts. It was replaced by the Pakistan Premier League in 2004 as part of efforts to professionalise domestic football.

Karachi based Pakistan Airlines is the most successful team, winning the competition nine times.

== History ==
=== Early years (1948–1950) ===
The 1948 Pakistan National Football Championship, then known as the "Inter-Provincial Football Tournament", was the first season held between 28 May and 5 June, which ended with Sindh Red being crowned champions after defeating Sindh Blue in the final at the YMCA Ground in Karachi. It is also claimed by some sources that the 1948 season was won by Karachi Red.

However, any sort of professionalism in the game was non-existent, as the first participants of the championship used players from local schools, colleges, government departments that coincidentally employed sportsmen, and open trials. Parallel to the championship, many separate amateur regional leagues with promotion and relegation featuring clubs were also held, like Karachi Football League, Lahore District Football League, or Quetta Football League. Players frequently took part in these competitions for their local clubs, while also being selected to represent either their provincial associations or their departmental teams in the National Championship.

After first two years of lack of funds and mismanagement, the Pakistan Football Federation failed to organise the National Championship 1949. However, in early 1950, the PFF was completely restructured and reorganised, bringing the competition back, this time held in early September 1950 at Quetta where Balochistan Red beat the Sind–Karachi team in the final. The results of the 1950 National Championship contributed in the selection of the first ever Pakistan national football team, which debuted internationally on its first official tour to Iran and Iraq in October 1950.

=== Punjab Dominance (1952–1960) ===
In 1951, the Pakistan Football Federation weren't able to organize the third National Football Championship which was initially scheduled to be held in Dacca, East Pakistan, with the competition beginning on 10 September 1951. However, the tournament was postponed and then ultimately canceled a month earlier due to the ongoing Kashmir conflict between India and Pakistan.

The 1950s editions of the National Championship were mostly dominated by the provincial Punjab football team, with the team consisting of international players such as Riasat Ali, Abdul Haq, Ghulam Rabbani, Talib Ali, Masood ul Hassan Butt, and Masood Fakhri. The team won the competition four consecutive times during the years 1952 till 1955, defeating the NWFP three times in the finals (1952, 1953, and 1955). The provincial side also competed under different names, including Punjab Blue in 1954 and 1958, they would also win the championship in the same years.

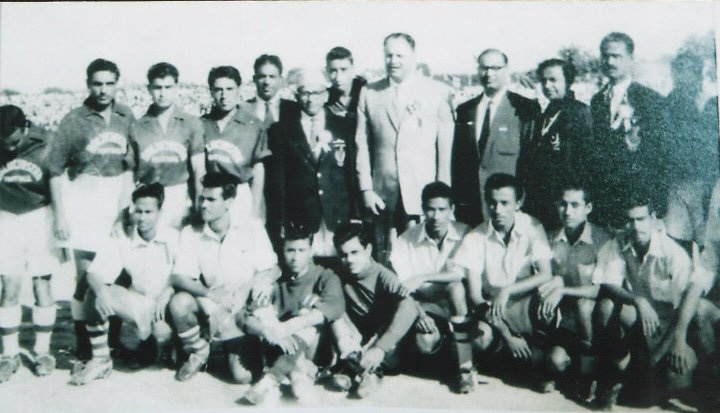
East Pakistan and Balochistan teams before the 1959 final.

In 1956, the Balochistan football team secured their first national title, defeating Railway White in the final by 2–1. Just three years later, Balochistan would embark on another impressive campaign, defeating several strong opponents to reach the final.

In 1957, a Talib Ali led Punjab squad would once again win another National Football title against the East Pakistan Whites in Dacca. Defeating them 2–1 at the Dacca Stadium. The squad would compete under the name Punjab Blue in 1958, same as they did in 1954. The side would go on to win the title back-to-back.

In 1960, East Pakistan would claim their first ever National title, having the likes of Muhammad Yaqub, Ghulam Rabbani, Abdullah Rahi, Moosa Jr., having already achieved a runners-up position at the 1957 edition. The team won the championship at Railway Stadium, defeating Karachi Whites in the final 1–0.

=== Karachi-Dhaka rivalry (1961–1971) ===
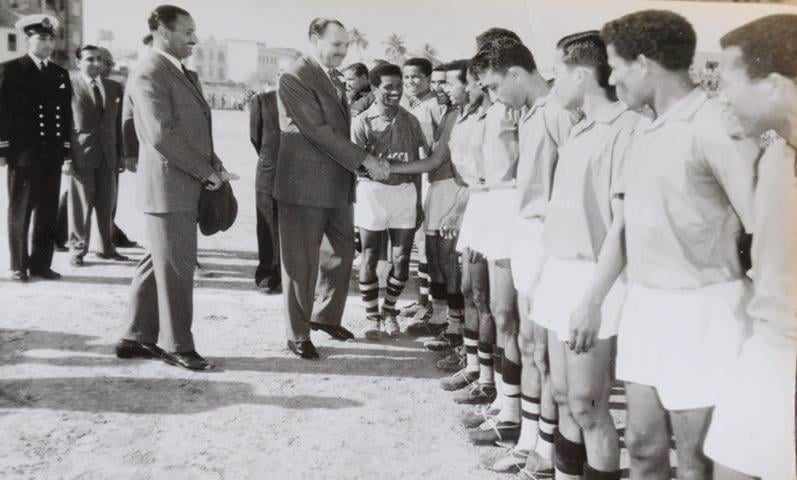
1961–62 National Football Championship final between Dacca Division and Karachi Blues. Ayub Khan and Asghar Khan meeting with Dacca Division

In 1961, under PFF newly elected president Asghar Khan, the National Football Championship structure in Pakistan transitioned from provincial to divisional based teams.

Between 1961 and 1966, Karachi Division and Dacca Division began dominating when the two teams won five consecutive national championships between 1960 and 1966. Much of the credit was due to the Dhaka Football League that gave a level of competitive professionalism in East Pakistan, which lacked in West Pakistan. Many leading players affiliated with Dhaka League clubs, both from West and East Pakistan, were chosen to represent the East Pakistan provincial team or the Dhaka Division team in the National Championship.

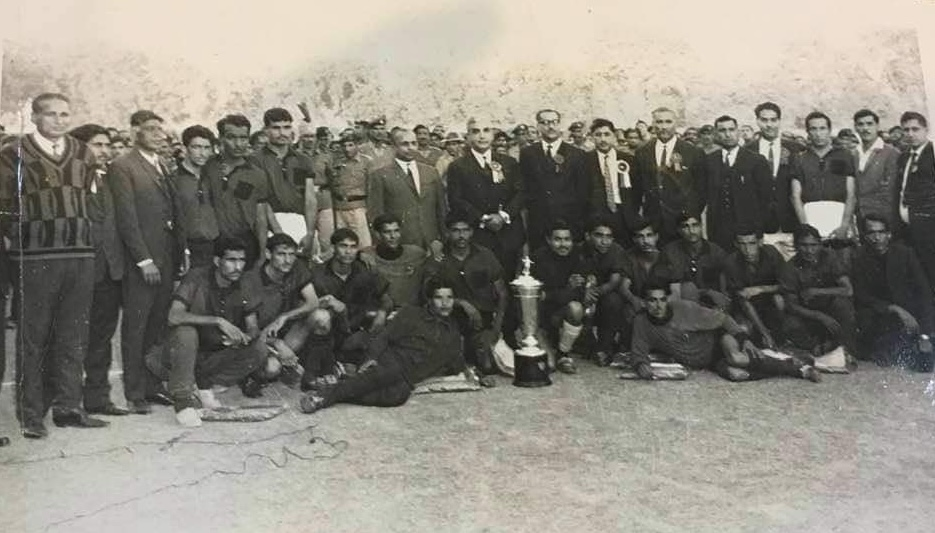
1969 National Football Championship-winning Pakistan Western Railway team pictured with Yahya Khan

Before the Bangladesh Liberation War, the 1969–70 National Championship was won by Chittagong Division in East Pakistan as they beat Peshawar Division in the final at Comilla. A year later without teams from East Pakistan, Pakistan Airlines won its first ever national championship in Multan after overcoming Karachi Division in the final.

=== Pakistan Airlines dominance (1971–1991) ===
After the formation of Bangladesh in December 1971, clubs from East Pakistan stopped featuring in the league. Football mainly survived on the basis of sports budgets of majority of the departmental teams and armed forces teams which already dominated in West Pakistan, which hired footballers as employees and provided them with a basic wage to play for their sides and work full time in the off-season. These government entities primarily used investment in sports as evidence of their Corporate Social Responsibility, with little incentive to develop talent or professionalise their set-ups. Similar system was also prevalent in several countries such as the Soviet Union, and was abolished in these nations after the 1960s.

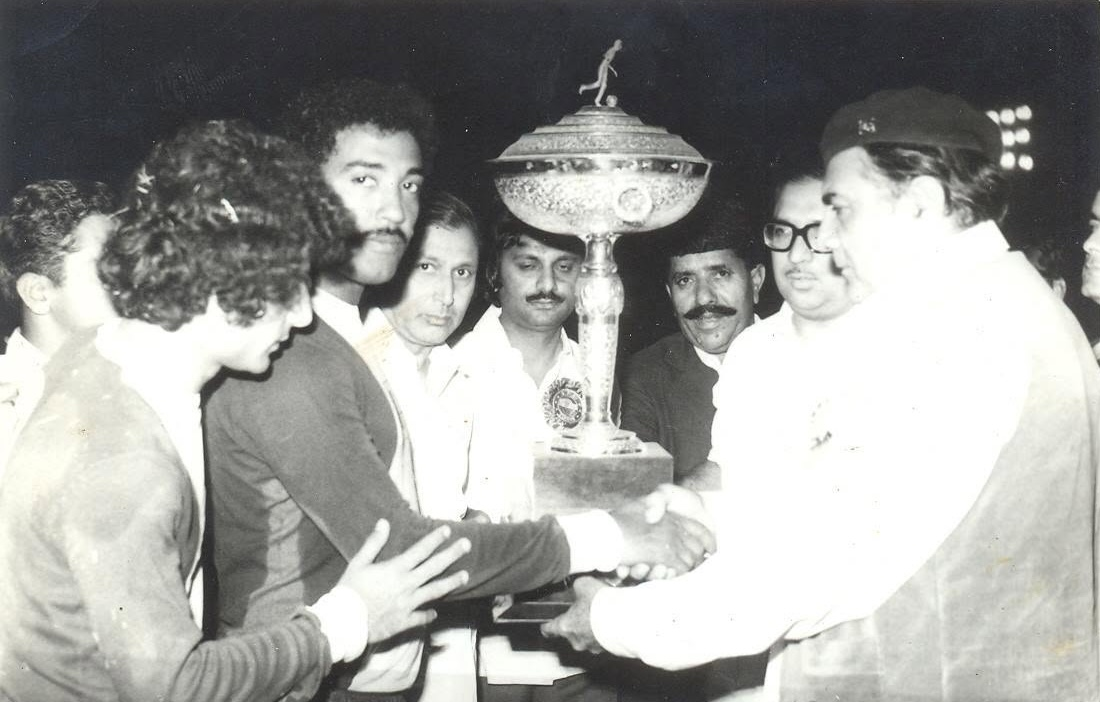
PIA FC receiving the 1976 National Football Championship trophy, the team dominated the competition from the 1970s till 1990s

In the consequent years, Pakistan Airlines continued dominating the domestic structure. Their third title came in the first of the two 1975 seasons, defeating provincial side Punjab A. In 1976 they retained their title, holding off a challenge from Pakistan Railways. Pakistan Airlines were defending champions in 1978, after there being no football 1977 due to martial law, but they continued to dominate Pakistani football and beat Sindh Red to take the championship for a fifth time.

They defeated Pakistan Air Force in 1981 to win their sixth title. They had to wait eight years for their next title win, Sindh Government Press were the team beaten in 1989.

=== League format (1992–1994) ===
Under the General Secretary of the Pakistan Football Federation Hafiz Salman Butt, the 1992–93 and 1993–94 seasons won by Pakistan Airlines and Pakistan Army respectively structured on a proper league-style basis and spread over a number of months. The top division, named as National Lifebuoy A-Division Football Championship, operated alongside a system of promotion and relegation with the second-tier National Lifebuoy B-Division Football Championship, which was won by Crescent Textile Mills (1992), National Bank (1993), and Frontier Scouts (1994).

The years were often regarded as the best administrative era of Pakistani football. Butt managed to get a three-year sponsorship deal with Lifebuoy Soap, with amounts of 35 million PKR spent in the organisations of the seasons and televised through the country. Out of that amount, 15 million rupees were spent on advertisement and remaining 20 million on the players and teams over the three-year period. The teams were awarded 50,000 rupee bonuses.

Butt was eventually ousted by Mian Muhammad Azhar due to political rifts and alleged abuse of power. With Butt's dismissal in 1994 and ban by FIFA in 1995, Pakistani football declined again into an era of mismanagement and long-lasting lack of sponsors in the upcoming years. The National Championship also reverted to its previous knockout format.

=== Later years ===
Pakistan Airlines lost their dominance until the end of the 1990s, winning their last of 9 national championships in 1997. WAPDA, Pakistan Army, and Allied Bank before their disbanding in early 2000s took over as the dominant sides in Pakistan. The physically dominant gameplay of Punjab teams, had over-taken Karachi football by then.

=== Disbandment ===
In 2004, after the PFF came under new management under president Faisal Saleh Hayat, the National Football Championship was phased out in favour of adapting a National League.

A comparable structure continues today in Football at the National Games of Pakistan, which also features provincial and departmental teams. The 2010 KPT-PFF Cup, a cup competition organised by the PFF also featured a similar structure.

In 2017, the Pakistan Football Federation had planned to return the National Football Championship under the same previous format, amidst football and league inactivity since 2015 due to crisis within the federation.

== Sponsorship ==
Period	Sponsor	Tournament name
1992–1994	Lifebuoy	National Lifebuoy A-Division Football Championship

== Champions ==
- **Bold** indicates double winners – i.e. League and Domestic (National Challenge) Cup.
- Note: Various provinces (Sindh, NWFP, Balochistan, Punjab, East Pakistan), divisions (Karachi, Peshawar) or other clubs (Railways) entered teams under various names; all finalists listed can nevertheless be regarded as the 'first' team of the respective clubs with the exception of the 1948 losing finalists, Sindh Blue, who were the second-string team of Sindh.

=== List of champions by season ===
Ed.	Season	Host city	Winner	Score	Runner-up
1	1948	Karachi	Sindh Red (1)		Sindh Blue
2	1950	Quetta	Balochistan Red (1)	1–0	Sindh
3	1952	Dacca	Punjab (1)	1–0	NWFP
4	1953	Peshawar	Punjab (2)		NWFP Blue
5	1954	Lahore	Punjab Blue (3)	3–0	Pakistan Railways
6	1955	Bahawalpur	Punjab (4)	5–1	NWFP
7	1956	Karachi	Balochistan (2)	2–1	Railways White
8	1957	Dacca	Punjab (5)	2–1	East Pakistan White
9	1958	Multan	Punjab Blue (6)	2–1	Pakistan Railways
10	1959	Hyderabad	Balochistan (3)	1–0	East Pakistan
11	1960	Karachi	East Pakistan (1)	1–0	Karachi White
12	1961–62	Karachi	Dacca Division (1)	6–1	Karachi Blue
13	1962	Dacca	Dacca Division (2)	4–0	Karachi Division
14	1963	Karachi	Karachi Division (1)	3–1	Pakistan Railways
15	1964–65	Peshawar	Karachi Division (2)	2–1	Pakistan Railways
16	1966	Karachi	Karachi Division (3)	1–0	Pakistan Railways
17	1968	Jessore	Peshawar Division (1)	3–2	Lahore Division
18	1969	Lahore	Pakistan Railways (1)	2–1	Karachi Division
19	1969–70	Comilla	Chittagong Division (1)	1–0	Peshawar Division
20	1971	Multan	Pakistan Airlines (1)	2–1	Karachi Division
21	1972	Peshawar	Pakistan Airlines (2)		Peshawar White
22	1973	Karachi	Karachi Yellow (4)		Rawalpindi Division
23	1975 (I)	Multan	Pakistan Airlines (3)	3–1	Punjab A
24	1975 (II)	Quetta	Sindh Red (2)	3–1	Balochistan Red
25	1976	Sukkur	Pakistan Airlines (4)		Pakistan Railways
26	1978	Rawalpindi	Pakistan Airlines (5)	1–0	Sindh Red
27	1979	Karachi	Karachi Red (5)	3–1	Pakistan Airlines
28	1980	Faisalabad	Karachi Red (6)		Pakistan Army
29	1981	Peshawar	Pakistan Airlines (6)	2–2 (4–3 p)	Pakistan Air Force
30	1982	Quetta	Habib Bank (1)	1–0	Pakistan Railways
31	1983	Lahore	WAPDA (1)	0–0 (5–4 p)	Habib Bank
32	1984	Karachi	Pakistan Railways (2)	2–0	WAPDA
33	1985	Quetta	Quetta Division (1)	2–1	Pakistan Airlines
34	1986	Peshawar	Pakistan Air Force (1)		Pakistan Airlines
	1987	Quetta	**Crescent Textile Mills** (1)		Karachi Port Trust
	1989 (I)	Lahore	Punjab Red (7)		Pakistan Railways
35	1989 (II)	Quetta	Pakistan Airlines (7)	2–1	Sindh Government Press
36	1990	Islamabad	Punjab Red (8)	2–0	Pakistan Airlines
37	1991	Lahore	WAPDA (2)	1–0	Habib Bank
38	1992–93	Various	Pakistan Airlines (8)	League format	Pakistan Army
	1993–94	Various	Pakistan Army (1)	League format	WAPDA
	1994	Various	Crescent Textile Mills (2)	1–0	WAPDA
	1995	Peshawar	Pakistan Army (2)	1–0	Allied Bank
40	1997 (I)	Sahiwal	Allied Bank (1)	0–0 (3–0 p)	Pakistan Airlines
	1997 (II)	Faisalabad	Pakistan Airlines (9)	1–1 (3–1 p)	Allied Bank
	1999	Lahore	**Allied Bank (2)**	0–0 (4–3 p)	Pakistan Navy
43	2000	Karachi	Allied Bank (3)	1–0	Habib Bank
	2001	Quetta	WAPDA (3)	1–1 (4–3 p)	Khan Research Laboratories
45/46	2003	Bannu	WAPDA (4)	0–0 (4–2 p)	Pakistan Army

== Total titles won ==
Club	Winners	Runners-up	Winning seasons
Pakistan Airlines	9	5	1971, 1972, 1975, 1976, 1978, 1981, 1989, 1992–93, 1997
Punjab^{2}	8	1	1952, 1953, 1954, 1955, 1957, 1958, 1989, 1990
Karachi Division^{3}	6	4	1963, 1964–65, 1966, 1973, 1979, 1980
WAPDA	4	3	1983, 1991, 2001, 2003
Allied Bank	3	2	1997, 1999, 2000
Balochistan^{4}	3	1	1950, 1956, 1959
Pakistan Railways	2	9	1969, 1984
Pakistan Army	2	3	1993–94, 1995
Sindh^{5}	2	3	1948, 1975
Crescent Textile Mills†	2	0	1987, 1994
Dacca Division	2	0	1961–62, 1962
Habib Bank	1	3	1982
East Pakistan	1	1	1960
Pakistan Air Force	1	1	1986
Peshawar Division	1	1	1968
Chittagong Division	1	0	1969–70
Quetta Division	1	0	1985
NWFP	0	3	
Karachi Port Trust	0	1	
Lahore Division	0	1	
Pakistan Navy	0	1	
Sindh Government Press	0	1	
Sindh Blue	0	1	
Karachi	0	1	

== Total titles won by provinces ==
Punjab dominated the championship with a total of 21 titles won. Sindh based Karachi and East Bengal based Dacca dominated the league from 1960 to 1965; Dacca winning consecutive titles from 1960 to 1961 and 1961–62, and Karachi winning back to back three titles from 1962 to 1963, 1963–64 and 1964–65.

Province	Number of titles	Clubs
Punjab	21	Punjab (8), WAPDA (4), Allied Bank (3), Pakistan Army (2), Pakistan Railways (2), Crescent Textile Mills (2)
Sindh	18	Pakistan Airlines (9), Karachi Division (6), Sindh (2), Habib Bank (1)
Balochistan	4	Balochistan (3), Quetta Division (1)
East Bengal (now Bangladesh)	3	Dacca Division (2), Chittagong Division (1)
NWFP	2	Pakistan Air Force (1), Peshawar Division (1)

=== By City / Town ===
City / Town	Championships	Clubs
Karachi	18	Pakistan Airlines (9), Karachi Division (6), Sindh (2), Habib Bank (1)
Lahore	17	Punjab (8), WAPDA (4), Allied Bank (3), Pakistan Railways (2)
Quetta	4	Balochistan (3), Quetta Division (1)
Rawalpindi	2	Pakistan Army (2)
Peshawar	2	Pakistan Air Force (1), Peshawar Division (1)
Dhaka	2	Dacca Division (2)
Faisalabad	2	Crescent Textile Mills (2)
Chittagong	1	Chittagong Division (1)

== Top scorers ==
Year	Player	Club	Goals	Ref.
1948–1956	Unknown			
1957	(Pakistan) Ashraf Chowdhury	East Pakistan White	5	
1958	(Pakistan) Lal Muhammad	Pakistan Railways	6	
1959	(Pakistan) Qayyum Changezi	Baluchistan	6	
1960	(Pakistan) Muhammad Yaqub	East Pakistan	7	
1961–62	(Pakistan) Moosa Ghazi	Dacca Division	9	
1962	(Pakistan) Muhammad Umer	Dacca Division	9	
1963	Unknown			
1964–1965	(Pakistan) Mahmood	Karachi Division	9	
1966–1995	Unknown			
1997 (I)	(Pakistan) Zahid Niaz	Pakistan Airlines	7	
1997 (II)–1999	Unknown			
2000	(Pakistan) Gohar Zaman	Allied Bank	7	
2001	(Pakistan) Allah Nawaz	Khan Research Laboratories	6	
2001	(Pakistan) Gohar Zaman	Allied Bank	6	
2003	(Pakistan) Imran Hussain	Pakistan Army	7	

== See also ==
- Santosh Trophy
- National Football Championship (Bangladesh)
- Football at the National Games of Pakistan
