= Pakistan Railways F.C. =

Pakistani football club

Pakistan Railways
- Full name: Pakistan Railways Football Club
- Nickname: The Railwaymen
- Short name: PRFC
- Founded: 1880s; 145 years ago (as North-Western Railway Football Club)
- Ground: Railway Stadium
- Capacity: 5,000
- Owner: Pakistan Railways
- Chairman: Aamir Ali Baloch
Home colours	Away colours

Pakistan Railways FC serves as the football section of Pakistan Railways, a state-owned railway company. Based in Lahore, the club play at the Railway Stadium. Founded in the 1880s during the British Raj as North-Western Railway Football Club, it is one of the oldest football clubs in Pakistan. The club used to compete in the National Football Championship and Pakistan Premier League. The club regularly participates in the PFF National Challenge Cup.

== History ==
=== North-Western Railway (1880s–1961) ===
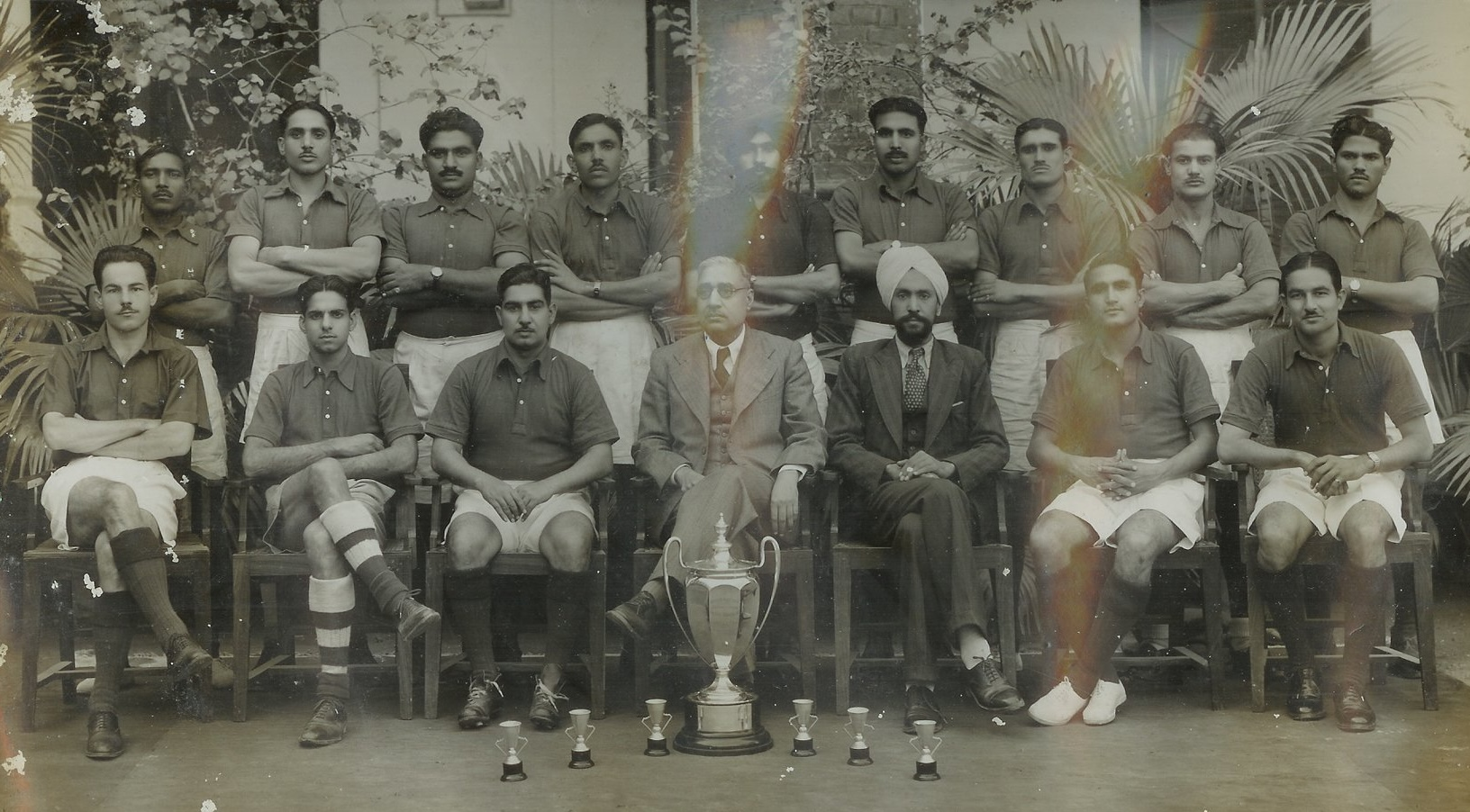
North-Western Railway football team, runners-up at the 1946 Inter-Railways Football Tournament

The North-Western Railway Football Club was founded in the 1880s as representative of the North Western State Railway in football competitions in British India. In its early years, it was operated predominantly by the British railwaymen and officials. The team has been recorded as playing in several football tournaments in the 1890s in Lahore.

At the 1938 Durand Cup, the Lahore-based side finished runner-ups after losing against the South Wales Borderers football team in the final by 0–1.

After the partition of British India in 1947, most of the North Western Railway network was allocated to Pakistan, and the team remained active in the newly formed country. Immediately after, the "Pakistan Railways Sports Association" was formed in 1950, which was later renamed to "Pakistan Railways Sports Control Board". And was responsible for the team playing in several tournaments across Pakistan.

In the 1954 National Football Championship, the team finished as runner-up after losing to Punjab Blues in the final. In 1956, competing as Railway White, it again placed second, this time against Balochistan. In 1958, the team again lost in the final against Punjab Blues.

=== Pakistan Western Railway (1961–1974) ===
In early 1961, the North-Western Railway was renamed as Pakistan Western Railway, and the club name was accordingly changed. A separate side, Pakistan Eastern Railway, represented the railway division in East Pakistan.

Between 1963 and 1966, the team finished runner-up in three consecutive finals, each time against Karachi.

Pakistan Western Railway's starting line-up at the 1963 Aga Khan Gold Cup final against Dhaka Wanderers.

In 1963, the club won its first major honour by lifting the Aga Khan Gold Cup after defeating Dhaka Wanderers in the final. After the finalisation of the 1964 Aga Khan Gold Cup, Persija played exhibition matches against Karachi Selected winning 2–0 at the KMC Stadium, Pakistan Western Railway drawing 1–1 at the Ibn-e-Qasim Bagh Stadium, and Lahore Selected winning 4–2 at the Railway Stadium.

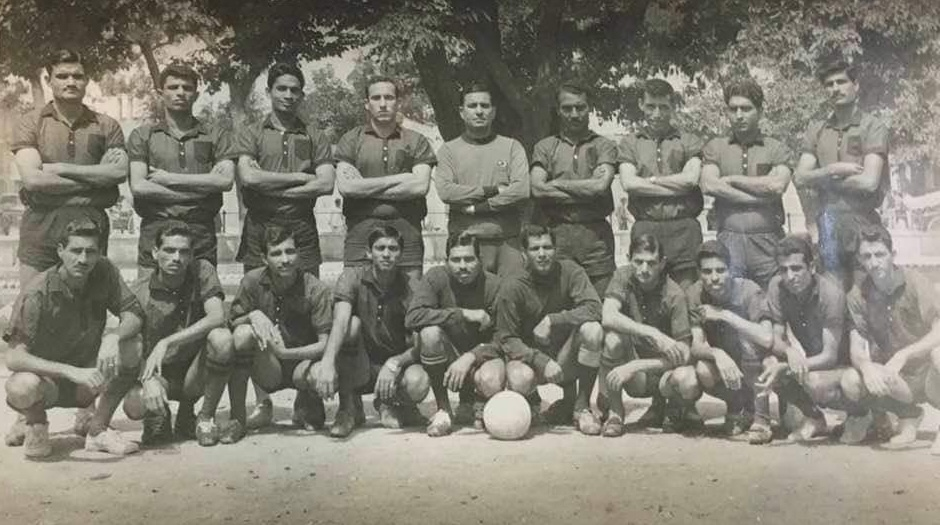
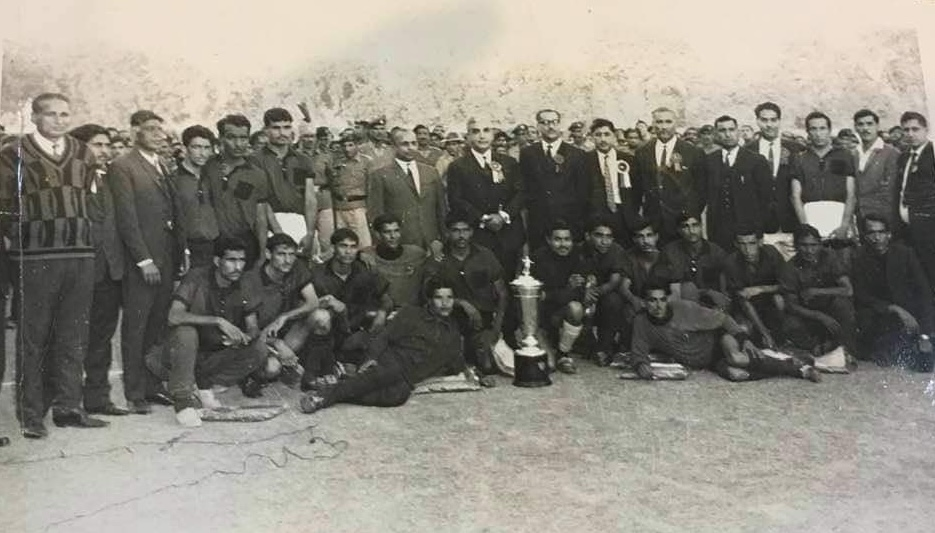
1969 National Football Championship-winning Pakistan Western Railway team

In 1969, it secured its first National Football Championship title by defeating Karachi. The following year, the team went on tour to Kabul, winning all three matches they played.

In 1972, the club won the "All-Pakistan Lyallpur Floodlit Football Tournament".

=== Renaming to Pakistan Railways (1974–2005) ===
Following the renaming of Pakistan Western Railway to Pakistan Railways in 1974, three years after the independence of Bangladesh and losing the eastern wing, the club adopted its present name.

In the 1976 National Football Championship, the team lost to Pakistan Airlines in the final. In 1982, it again finished runner-ups after losing to Habib Bank.

In 1984, it won its second National Football Championship, after overcoming WAPDA in the final. Following the 1985 Quaid-e-Azam International Tournament, the visiting North Korean team played three exhibition matches across Pakistan. In the match against Pakistan Railways, they lost 1–3 in Multan. In July 1985, the team participated at the M.H.Mohammed Gold Cup Invitation Tournament in Colombo, Sri Lanka.

In 1989, the team finished runner-ups after losing to Punjab Red.

=== Pakistan Premier League era (2006–2015) ===
After the revamp in Pakistani football and the discontinuation of the National Football Championship, the club competed in the second-tier, winning the 2005–06 PFF National League, returning to the top flight.

They were relegated from Pakistan Premier League after two years in the 2007–08 Pakistan Premier League. Chaudhry Muhammad Asghar was Pakistan Railways football coach till that time. The coaching was then passed to Muhammad Rasheed, the ex-national player and Pakistan Railways player.

Railways again qualified to the top-tier by winning their departmental leg of the 2013 PFF League. It remained in the top tier until getting relegated again in the 2014–15 Pakistan Premier League.

=== 2023–present ===
Following the domestic football revamp in the country in 2023, departmental clubs including Railways remained competing in the PFF National Challenge Cup.

== Stadium ==
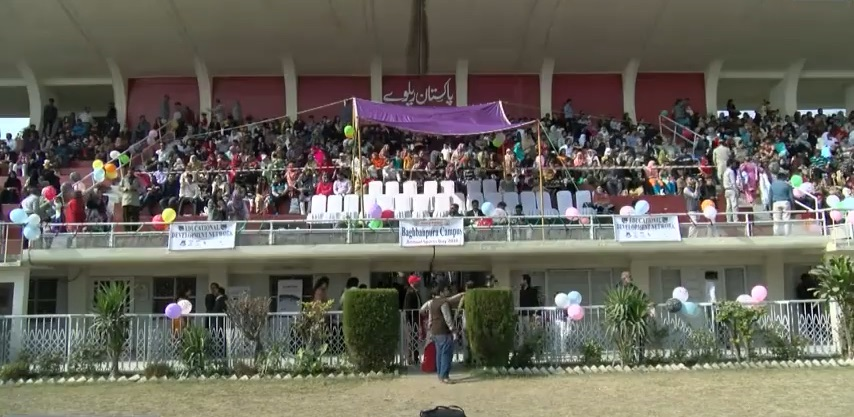
Railway Stadium in Garhi Shahu

Since 1932, the Railway Stadium in Garhi Shahu, Lahore, owned by the Pakistan Railways Sports Board serve as the team own ground. It has also been a historic football venue of Pakistan, hosting several domestic and international football matches.

== Notable players ==
The players below had senior international cap(s) for their respective countries. Players whose name is listed, represented their countries before or after playing for Pakistan Railways.

Asia

- (India) Taj Mohammad Sr. (1957)

== Honours ==
=== Domestic ===
==== Leagues ====
- National Football Championship
  - Winners (2): 1969, 1984
  - Runners-up (9): 1954, 1956, 1958, 1963, 1964–65, 1966, 1976, 1982, 1989
- Football Federation League
  - Winners (2): 2005–06, 2013

=== Invitational ===
- Durand Cup
  - Runners-up (1): 1938
- Aga Khan Gold Cup
  - Winners (1): 1963

== See also ==
- Eastern Railway FC
