= 2002 President PFF Cup =

National Football Challenge Cup

Tournament details
- Country: Pakistan
- Venue(s): People's Football Stadium, Karachi
- Dates: 14 October 2002 – 3 November 2002
- Teams: 24 (total); 23 (participating, 1 team withdrew)

Final positions
- Champions: Allied Bank (4th title)
- Runners-up: WAPDA

Tournament statistics
- Matches played: 39
- Goals scored: 126 (3.23 per match)
- Top goal scorer: Zahid Niaz (7 goals)

The 2002 President PFF Cup was the 15th edition of Pakistan National Football Challenge Cup. It ran from 14 October till 3 November 2002, and held at People Football Stadium in Karachi.

Pakistan Army were the defending champions. Agha Gas Quetta, a gas company belonging to the general secretary of Pakistan Football Federation, Agha Liaquat Ali also participated. The Karachi Metropolitan Corporation FC (KMC) returned to the competition under the name City District Government Karachi. Quetta Municipal Corporation (QMC) also participated renamed as City District Government Quetta (CDGQ).

Allied Bank won the tournament, defeating WAPDA through penalty shootout after a draw.

== Group stage ==
=== Group A ===
| Pos | Team | Pld | W | D | L | GF | GA | GD | Pts | Qualification |
|---|---|---|---|---|---|---|---|---|---|---|
| 1 | Pakistan Army | 2 | 2 | 0 | 0 | 5 | 2 | +3 | 6 | Advance to Knockout round |
| 2 | Pakistan Machine Tool Factory | 2 | 1 | 0 | 1 | 4 | 5 | −1 | 3 | Advance to Knockout round |
| 3 | Crescent Textile Mills | 2 | 0 | 0 | 2 | 1 | 3 | −2 | 0 | |

Source: RSSSF
15 October 2002

| Pakistan Army | 4–2 | Pakistan Machine Tool Factory |
|---|---|---|
| Hussain 40', 77', 84', 88' | Report | Muhammad Musa 51'; Ghulam Mustafa 69' |

People's Football Stadium
18 October 2002

| Pakistan Machine Tool Factory | 2–1 | Crescent Textile Mills |
|---|---|---|
| Abdul Haq 71', 81' | Report | Muneer Ahmed |

People's Football Stadium
21 October 2002

| Pakistan Army | 1–0 | Crescent Textile Mills |
|---|---|---|
| Hussain 85' | Report |

People's Football Stadium

=== Group B ===
| Pos | Team | Pld | W | D | L | GF | GA | GD | Pts | Qualification |
|---|---|---|---|---|---|---|---|---|---|---|
| 1 | Pakistan Airlines | 2 | 2 | 0 | 0 | 8 | 3 | +5 | 6 | Advance to Knockout round |
| 2 | Pakistan Railways | 2 | 1 | 0 | 1 | 3 | 4 | −1 | 3 | Advance to Knockout round |
| 3 | Pakistan Public Works Department | 2 | 0 | 0 | 2 | 3 | 7 | −4 | 0 | |

Source: RSSSF
17 October 2002

| Pakistan Airlines | 5–2 | Pakistan Public Works Department |
|---|---|---|
| Niaz 32', 44', 58', 79'; Jawaid Nawaz 83' | Report | Tariq Umer 25'; Ghulam Nabi 75' |

People's Football Stadium
19 October 2002

| Pakistan Public Works Department | 1–2 | Pakistan Railways |
|---|---|---|
| Tajuddin 39' | Report | Tariq Javed 66'; Nauman Chaudhry 86' |

People's Football Stadium
21 October 2002

| Pakistan Railways | 1–3 | Pakistan Airlines |
|---|---|---|
| Fareed Kamran 82' | Report | Niaz 40', 63', 84' |

People's Football Stadium

=== Group C ===
| Pos | Team | Pld | W | D | L | GF | GA | GD | Pts | Qualification |
|---|---|---|---|---|---|---|---|---|---|---|
| 1 | Pakistan Air Force | 2 | 2 | 0 | 0 | 3 | 1 | +2 | 6 | Advance to Knockout round |
| 2 | Habib Bank | 2 | 1 | 0 | 1 | 4 | 4 | 0 | 3 | Advance to Knockout round |
| 3 | City District Government Karachi | 2 | 0 | 0 | 2 | 3 | 6 | −3 | 0 | |

Source: RSSSF
17 October 2002

| Habib Bank | 4–2 | City District Government Karachi |
|---|---|---|
| Amjad Yousuf 26'; Muhammad Umer 32' (pen.); Saleem 62', 81' | Report | Imran Junior 39'; Abdul Rehman 72' |

People's Football Stadium
19 October 2002

| City District Government Karachi | 1–2 | Pakistan Air Force |
|---|---|---|
| Abdul Rehman 28' | Report | Muhammad Tahir 62'; Muhammad Iqbal 87' (pen.) |

People's Football Stadium
22 October 2002

| Habib Bank | 0–2 | Pakistan Air Force |
|---|---|---|
| | Report | Muhammad Fazal 34'; Saleh Khan 47' |

People's Football Stadium

=== Group D ===
| Pos | Team | Pld | W | D | L | GF | GA | GD | Pts | Qualification |
|---|---|---|---|---|---|---|---|---|---|---|
| 1 | WAPDA | 2 | 2 | 0 | 0 | 4 | 1 | +3 | 6 | Advance to Knockout round |
| 2 | Agha Gas Quetta | 2 | 1 | 0 | 1 | 3 | 2 | +1 | 3 | Advance to Knockout round |
| 3 | ~~Pakistan Police~~ * | 2 | 0 | 0 | 2 | 0 | 4 | −4 | 0 | |

Source: RSSSF

| Agha Gas Quetta | 2–0 Awarded | Pakistan Police |
|---|---|---|
| | Report |

People's Football Stadium

| WAPDA | 2–0 Awarded | Pakistan Police |
|---|---|---|
| | Report |

People's Football Stadium
22 October 2002

| WAPDA | 2–1 | Agha Gas Quetta |
|---|---|---|
| Butt 24'; Ahmed 64' | Report | Sadiq Ali 85' |

People's Football Stadium

=== Group E ===
| Pos | Team | Pld | W | D | L | GF | GA | GD | Pts | Qualification |
|---|---|---|---|---|---|---|---|---|---|---|
| 1 | Karachi Port Trust | 2 | 2 | 0 | 0 | 6 | 3 | +3 | 6 | Advance to Knockout round |
| 2 | Afghan Agency Chaman | 2 | 0 | 1 | 1 | 2 | 3 | −1 | 1 | Advance to Knockout round |
| 3 | Pakistan Ordnance Factories | 2 | 0 | 1 | 1 | 1 | 3 | −2 | 1 | |

Source: RSSSF
19 October 2002

| Karachi Port Trust | 3–1 | Pakistan Ordnance Factories |
|---|---|---|
| Muhammad Akhtar 11' (pen.); Nawaz Rehman 74'; Muhammad Amin 79' | Report | Manzoor Ahmed 54' |

People's Football Stadium
21 October 2002

| Pakistan Ordnance Factories | 0–0 | Afghan Agency Chaman |
|---|---|---|
| | Report |

People's Football Stadium
23 October 2002

| Karachi Port Trust | 3–2 | Afghan Agency Chaman |
|---|---|---|
| Majeed 17'; Abdul Aziz 61'; Muhammad Amin 83' | Report | Ahmed Shah 44' (pen.); Zafar Ahmed 56' |

People's Football Stadium

=== Group F ===
| Pos | Team | Pld | W | D | L | GF | GA | GD | Pts | Qualification |
|---|---|---|---|---|---|---|---|---|---|---|
| 1 | Pakistan Telecommunications | 2 | 1 | 1 | 0 | 6 | 1 | +5 | 4 | Advance to Knockout round |
| 2 | Pakistan Navy | 2 | 1 | 1 | 0 | 2 | 1 | +1 | 4 | Advance to Knockout round |
| 3 | Sui Southern Gas | 2 | 0 | 0 | 2 | 2 | 8 | −6 | 0 | |

Source: RSSSF
15 October 2002

| Pakistan Navy | 2–1 | Sui Southern Gas |
|---|---|---|
| Basharat Ali 11', 25' | Report | Taj Muhammad 3' |

People's Football Stadium
20 October 2002

| Pakistan Navy | 0–0 | Pakistan Telecommunications |
|---|---|---|
| | Report |

People's Football Stadium
23 October 2002

| Pakistan Telecommunications | 6–1 | Sui Southern Gas |
|---|---|---|
| S. Ahmed 3', 48', 58', 89'; A. Ahmed 40', 44' | Report | Taj Muhammad 79' |

People's Football Stadium

=== Group G ===
| Pos | Team | Pld | W | D | L | GF | GA | GD | Pts | Qualification |
|---|---|---|---|---|---|---|---|---|---|---|
| 1 | KESC | 2 | 1 | 1 | 0 | 4 | 1 | +3 | 4 | Advance to Knockout round |
| 2 | Allied Bank | 2 | 1 | 1 | 0 | 3 | 0 | +3 | 4 | Advance to Knockout round |
| 3 | Karachi Water and Sewerage Board | 2 | 0 | 0 | 2 | 1 | 7 | −6 | 0 | |

Source: RSSSF
14 October 2002

| KESC | 4–1 | Karachi Water and Sewerage Board |
|---|---|---|
| Ghulam Habib 14' (pen.); Sohail Ishaq 57'; Abdul Waheed 81'; Lal Muhammad 84' | Report | Muhammad Akram 59' (pen.) |

People's Football Stadium
20 October 2002

| Allied Bank | 3–0 | Karachi Water and Sewerage Board |
|---|---|---|
| Zakariya 63', 68'; Yousaf 80' | Report |

People's Football Stadium
24 October 2002

| Allied Bank | 0–0 | KESC |
|---|---|---|
| | Report |

People's Football Stadium

=== Group H ===
| Pos | Team | Pld | W | D | L | GF | GA | GD | Pts | Qualification |
|---|---|---|---|---|---|---|---|---|---|---|
| 1 | National Bank | 2 | 2 | 0 | 0 | 7 | 2 | +5 | 6 | Advance to Knockout round |
| 2 | Khan Research Laboratories | 2 | 1 | 0 | 1 | 10 | 3 | +7 | 3 | Advance to Knockout round |
| 3 | City District Government Quetta | 2 | 0 | 0 | 2 | 2 | 14 | −12 | 0 | |

Source: RSSSF
17 October 2002

| Khan Research Laboratories | 1–2 | National Bank |
|---|---|---|
| Allah Nawaz 10' | Report | Muhammad Ismail Jr. 27'; Shahim Akhtar 39' (pen.) |

People's Football Stadium
20 October 2002

| National Bank | 5–1 | City District Government Quetta |
|---|---|---|
| Mohammad Ashraf 57'; Shahim Akhtar 60' (pen.); Akhtar Rasool 76', 87'; Sattar Manzoori 60' | Report | Muhammad Nadeem 37' |

People's Football Stadium
24 October 2002

| Khan Research Laboratories | 9–1 | City District Government Quetta |
|---|---|---|
| Rasool 8', 9', 36'; Qadeer Ahmed 14'; Sohail Rehman 29', 40', 55', 88'; Aziz 38' | Report | Muhammad Yousuf 53' |

People's Football Stadium

== Knockout round ==
=== Round of 16 ===
25 October 2002

| Pakistan International Airlines | 1–3 | Agha Gas Quetta Quetta |
|---|---|---|
| Muhammad Umer 78' | Report | Sadiq Ali 65'; Munawwar Ali 71'; Muhammad Ali 89' |

People's Football Stadium
25 October 2002

| Pakistan Army | 1–1 | Habib Bank |
|---|---|---|
| Imran Hussain 44' | Report | Javed Ali 87' |
Penalties
| Javed Nadeem (penalty scored); Irfan (penalty scored); Sajjad Haider (penalty scored); Ghulam Ali (penalty missed); Shahid Nadeem (penalty missed) | 3–4 | Shahid Saleem (penalty scored); Gulzar Ahmed (penalty scored); Shakir Hussain (penalty scored); Mohammad Tariq Hussain (penalty scored); Amjad Yousuf (penalty missed) |

People's Football Stadium

26 October 2002

| Pakistan Air Force | 0–1 (a.e.t.) | Pakistan Machine Tool Factory |
|---|---|---|
| | Report | Abdul Haq 112' |

People's Football Stadium
26 October 2002

| WAPDA | 2–1 | Pakistan Railways |
|---|---|---|
| Zulfiqar Ali Shah 47'; Zaheer Abbas | Report | Kaleem Akhtar 15' |

People's Football Stadium

27 October 2002

| Pakistan Telecommunications | 4–0 | Khan Research Laboratories |
|---|---|---|
| Muhammad Essa 24', 43' (pen.); Shahid Ahmed 29'; Sher Hussain 89' | Report |

People's Football Stadium
27 October 2002

| Karachi Port Trust | 0–1 (a.e.t.) | Allied Bank |
|---|---|---|
| | Report | Ashfaq Ahmad 114' |

People's Football Stadium

28 October 2002

| KESC | 4–0 | Afghan Agency Chaman |
|---|---|---|
| Aurangzeb 30', 64'; Aftab Qadir 5'; Lal Muhammad 84' | Report |

People's Football Stadium
28 October 2002

| National Bank | 1–2 | Pakistan Navy |
|---|---|---|
| Jamil Ahmed 21' | Report | Muhammad Ramzan 52'; Fida Hussain 70' |

People's Football Stadium

=== Quarter finals ===
29 October 2002

| Agha Gas Quetta | 0–3 | Habib Bank |
|---|---|---|
| | Report | Shakir Hussain 29'; Shahid Saleem 39', 84' |

People's Football Stadium
29 October 2002

| Pakistan Machine Tool Factory | 1–5 | WAPDA |
|---|---|---|
| Liaquat Ali 56' | Report | Khuda Bakhsh 8'; Zulfiqar Ahmed 47'; Zakir Hussain 58', 74'; Muhammad Niaz 89' |

People's Football Stadium

30 October 2002

| Pakistan Telecommunications | 0–1 | Allied Bank |
|---|---|---|
| | Report | Ijaz 32' |

People's Football Stadium
30 October 2002

| KESC | 1–0 | Pakistan Navy |
|---|---|---|
| Aurangzeb 103' | Report |

People's Football Stadium

=== Semi finals ===
31 October 2002

| Habib Bank | 9–1 | WAPDA |
|---|---|---|
| Rasool 8', 9', 36'; Qadeer Ahmed 14'; Sohail Rehman 29', 40', 55', 88'; Aziz 38' | Report | Muhammad Yousuf 53' |
Penalties
| Shahid Saleem (penalty scored); Shakir Hussain (penalty scored); Waheed Majeed (penalty scored); Mohammad Tariq Hussain (penalty scored); Gulzar Ahmed (penalty missed) | 4–5 | Muhammad Niaz (penalty scored); Dilshad Ahmed (penalty scored); Zulfiqar Ali Shah (penalty scored); Moin Ahmed (penalty scored); Abdul Razzaq (penalty scored) |

People's Football Stadium

1 November 2002

| Allied Bank | 2–1 | KESC |
|---|---|---|
| Asadullah 39'; Ashfaq Ahmad 66' | Report | Habib Ghulam 52' |

People's Football Stadium

=== Finals ===
3 November 2002

| Allied Bank | 1–1 | WAPDA |
|---|---|---|
| Ijaz 20' | Report | Zulfiqar Ahmad Shah 48' |
Penalties
| Zahid Rafiq (penalty scored); Amir Khan (penalty scored); Ashfaq Ahmad (penalty scored); Haroon Yousaf (penalty scored) | 4–2 | Zahir Hussain (penalty scored); Jamshed Anwar (penalty scored); Muhammad Niaz (penalty missed); Dilshad Ali (penalty missed) |

People's Football Stadium

== Statistics ==
=== Top goalscorers ===
| Rank | Player | Team | Goals |
|---|---|---|---|
| 1 | Zahid Niaz | Pakistan Airlines | 7 |
| 2 | Imran Hussain | Pakistan Army | 6 |
| 3 | Shahid Ahmed | Pakistan Telecommunications | 5 |
| 4 | Sohail Rehman | Khan Research Laboratories | 4 |
| 4 | Shahid Saleem | Habib Bank | 4 |
| 6 | Aurangzeb | KESC | 3 |
| 6 | Abdul Haq | PMTF | 3 |
| 6 | Sarfraz Rasool | Khan Research Laboratories | 3 |
