= 1995 SAARC Gold Cup squads =

The 1995 South Asian Gold Cup is an international football tournament held in Sri Lanka from 25 March to 2 April 1995. The five national teams involved in the tournament were required to register a squad of 23 players, including three goalkeepers. Only players in these squads were eligible to take part in the tournament.

== Bangladesh ==
Coach: (South Korea) Kang Man-young

No.	Pos.	Player	Date of birth (age)	Caps	Club
	GK	Mohammed Ponir	7 August 1969 (aged 25)		(Bangladesh) Mohammedan
	GK	Arifur Rahman Pannu	14 April 1973 (aged 21)		(Bangladesh) Muktijoddha Sangsad
	DF	Monem Munna	9 June 1966 (aged 28)		(Bangladesh) Abahani
	DF	Mohammed Jewel Rana	2 May 1968 (aged 26)		(Bangladesh) Muktijoddha Sangsad
	DF	Masoud Rana	20 November 1972 (aged 22)		(Bangladesh) Muktijoddha Sangsad
	DF	Arif Hossain Moon	6 January 1968 (aged 27)		(Bangladesh) Muktijoddha Sangsad
	DF	Sohel Reza	13 May 1969 (aged 25)		(Bangladesh) Abahani
	DF	Barun Bikash Dewan	1 February 1969 (aged 26)		(Bangladesh) Muktijoddha Sangsad
	DF	Alamgir Hasan	3 October 1971 (aged 23)		(Bangladesh) Mohammedan
	MF	Nurul Haque Manik	25 June 1964 (aged 30)		(Bangladesh) Mohammedan
	MF	Satyajit Das Rupu	5 September 1964 (aged 30)		(Bangladesh) Brothers Union
	MF	Shaheed Hossain Swapan	24 April 1969 (aged 25)		(Bangladesh) Abahani
	FW	Alfaz Ahmed	6 June 1973 (aged 21)		(Bangladesh) Arambagh KS
	FW	Rakib Hossain	10 March 1973 (aged 22)		(Bangladesh) Muktijoddha Sangsad
	FW	Shahidul Ahmed Ranjan	6 January 1972 (aged 23)		(Bangladesh) Brothers Union
	FW	Mamun Joarder	17 February 1968 (aged 27)		(Bangladesh) Muktijoddha Sangsad
	FW	Mizanur Rahman Mizan	2 May 1968 (aged 26)		(Bangladesh) Muktijoddha Sangsad
	FW	Imtiaz Ahmed Nakib	1 September 1969 (aged 25)		(Bangladesh) Muktijoddha Sangsad

== India ==
Coach: (Uzbekistan) Rustam Akramov

No.	Pos.	Player	Date of birth (age)	Caps	Club
	GK	Mohammed Yusuf Ansari	19 June 1970 (aged 24)		Air India
	GK	Sumit Mukherjee			(India)
	DF	Kooloth Valappil Dhanesh	13 February 1973 (aged 22)		(India)
	DF	Aloke Das			(India) Mohun Bagan
	DF	Vatta Parambath Sathyan	29 April 1965 (aged 29)		(India) Kerala Police
	DF	Amrik Singh			(India)
	DF	Jiju Jacob	25 December 1967 (aged 27)		(India)
	DF	Naushad Moosa	11 October 1971 (aged 23)		(India) East Bengal
	MF	Aqueel Ansari	2 June 1972 (aged 22)		(India)
	MF	Carlton Chapman	13 April 1971 (aged 23)		(India) East Bengal
	MF	Savio Medeira	20 March 1965 (aged 30)		(India) Salgaocar
	MF	Jo Paul Ancheri	2 August 1976 (aged 18)		(India) JCT Mills
	MF	Syed Sabir Pasha	5 November 1972 (aged 22)		(India) Indian Bank
	MF	Tejinder Kumar			(India)
	FW	Baichung Bhutia	15 June 1976 (aged 18)		(India) East Bengal
	FW	Bruno Coutinho	6 October 1969 (aged 25)		(India) Salgaocar
	FW	Kuljit Singh			(India)
		Tauzif Jamal			(India)

== Pakistan ==
Coach: (Pakistan) Tariq Lutfi

No.	Pos.	Player	Date of birth (age)	Caps	Club
	GK	Muhammad Younis			Pakistan Army
	GK	Muhammad Aslam Khan			Pakistan Airlines
	DF	Muhammad Tariq Hussain			(Pakistan) Habib Bank
	DF	Pervaiz Ahmed			(Pakistan) Habib Bank
	DF	Farooq Rehman			(Pakistan) Habib Bank
	DF	Haroon Yousaf			(Pakistan) WAPDA
	DF	Ansar Pervez Dar			Pakistan Army
	DF	Saqib Abbas			Pakistan Army
	DF	Muhammad Azhar			Pakistan Army
	DF	Muhammad Shahid Rehman			(Pakistan) Muslim Commercial Bank
	DF	Naseer Ahmed			(Pakistan) Muslim Commercial Bank
	MF	Nawaz Rehman			(Pakistan) Karachi Port Trust
	MF	Zafar Iqbal			Pakistan Airlines
	MF	Imtiaz Butt			Pakistan Airlines
	FW	Zahir Ahmed			Pakistan Navy
	FW	Nasir Ali			(Pakistan) National Bank
	FW	Muhammad Nauman Khan			Pakistan Army
	FW	Nadeem Sohail			(Pakistan) Crescent Textile Mills

== Nepal ==
Coach: (Nepal) Yogambar Suwal

No.	Pos.	Player	Date of birth (age)	Caps	Club
	GK	Upendra Man Singh	27 July 1973 (aged 21)		(Nepal) Friends Club
	DF	Dev Narayan Chaudhary	1 November 1974 (aged 20)		(Nepal) Mahendra Police Club
	DF	Rajesh Manandhar	14 February 1966 (aged 29)		(Nepal)
	DF	Rajesh Thapa			(Nepal)
	DF	Narendra Man Shrestha			(Nepal) New Road Team
	DF	Babu Kaji Dhaubanjar			(Nepal)
	MF	Bahadur Amatya Deepak			(Nepal)
	MF	Bal Gopal Maharajan	28 August 1975 (aged 19)		(Nepal) Boys Union
	MF	Umesh Pradhan	1 September 1966 (aged 28)		(Nepal)
	MF	Gyanendra Prasad Sherchan			(Nepal)
	MF	Birat Jung Shahi	30 July 1967 (aged 27)		(Nepal)
	MF	Saugesh Shrestha			(Nepal)
	MF	Sunil Tuladhar	8 October 1977 (aged 17)		(Nepal) Manang Marshyangdi Club
	FW	Raju Kaji Shakya	7 July 1960 (aged 34)		(Bangladesh) East End Club
	FW	Suryaman Shrestha			(Nepal)
	FW	Hari Khadka	3 November 1976 (aged 18)		(Nepal) Ranipokhari Corner Team

== Sri Lanka ==
Coach: (Brazil) Jorge Ferreira

No.	Pos.	Player	Date of birth (age)	Caps	Club
	GK	Lalithe Werasinghe	25 December 1962 (aged 32)		(Sri Lanka)
	DF	Junaideen Hasheemdeen	7 August 1969 (aged 25)		(Sri Lanka)
	DF	Sampath Perera	30 October 1965 (aged 29)		(Sri Lanka) Air Force
	DF	Imthiyas Raheem	14 July 1972 (aged 22)		(Sri Lanka)
	DF	Mohamed Riza			(Sri Lanka)
	DF	Jagath Rohana	17 July 1966 (aged 28)		(Sri Lanka)
	MF	Prabath Ferdinand			(Sri Lanka)
	MF	Liyanage Perera			(Sri Lanka)
	MF	Anton Wambeck			(Sri Lanka)
	MF	Majula Chaminda Sirisena	18 July 1971 (aged 23)		(Sri Lanka)
	FW	Roshan Perera	1 September 1970 (aged 24)		(Sri Lanka) Ratnam
	FW	Mohamed Amanulla			(Sri Lanka)
		Rizwan			(Sri Lanka)
		Agit Prasanna			(Sri Lanka)
		David Sarath Wellage			(Sri Lanka)
