= Pakistan national football team results (1990–1999) =

The following are the Pakistan national football team results in its official international matches from 1990 to 1999.

== Results ==
Key
Win
Draw
Defeat

=== 1990 ===
23 September 1990 1990 Asian Games G.S	China	3–0	Pakistan	Beijing, China
	Yuxin 15', 46'; Chao 90'	Report		Stadium: Xiannongtan Stadium

25 September 1990 1990 Asian Games G.S	Pakistan	0–7	South Korea	Beijing, China
		Report	Sun-hong 21', 39', 82'; Sang-ho 46', 51'; Jong-soo 68'; Jung-yoon 77'	Stadium: Fengtai Sports Center

27 September 1990 1990 Asian Games G.S	Singapore	6–1	Pakistan	Beijing, China
	Tokijan 15'; Ahmad 17'; Sundramoorthy 31', 42', 62'; Noor 78'	Report	Sharafat 35'	Stadium: Xiannongtan Stadium

=== 1991 ===
22 December 1991 1991 South Asian Games G.S	Pakistan	0–0	India	Colombo, Sri Lanka
		Report		Stadium: Sugathadasa Stadium

24 December 1991 1991 South Asian Games G.S	Pakistan	1–0	Bangladesh	Colombo, Sri Lanka
	Ashfaq 81'	Report		Stadium: Sugathadasa Stadium

29 December 1991 1991 South Asian Games Final	Pakistan	2–0	Maldives	Colombo, Sri Lanka
	Ashfaq 83'; Nauman 87'	Report		Stadium: Sugathadasa Stadium; Referee: Mohamad Mushiseen Ariff

=== 1992 ===
9 May 1992 1992 AFC Asian Cup qualification	India	2–0	Pakistan	Kolkata, India
	Vijayan 3', 81'	Report		Stadium: Salt Lake Stadium

11 May 1992 1992 AFC Asian Cup qualification	Pakistan	0–7	Iran	Kolkata, India
		Report	Pious 2'; Moharrami 12'; Marfavi 18', 82'; Ghayeghran 27'; Hassanzadeh 37'; Abtahi 43'	Stadium: Salt Lake Stadium; Attendance: 10,000; Referee: Shyam Shrestha (Nepal)

16 August 1992 1992 Jordan International Tournament	Jordan	2–0	Pakistan	Amman, Jordan
	Tadrus 15', 54'	Report		Stadium: Amman International Stadium

18 August 1992 1992 Jordan International Tournament	Pakistan	0–5	Moldova	Amman, Jordan
		Report	Scala 25'; Alexandrov 50', 55' (pen.), 70', 75'	Stadium: Amman International Stadium; Attendance: 15,000; Referee: Dirar Al Tamini (Jordan)

24 August 1992 1992 Jordan International Tournament	Sudan	4–0	Pakistan	Amman, Jordan
		Report		Stadium: Amman International Stadium

=== 1993 ===
22 May 1993 1994 FIFA World Cup qualification	Pakistan	0–5	China	Irbid, Jordan
		Report	Hongbo 38'; Sheng 55', 59', 82'; Haidong 71'	Stadium: Al-Hassan Stadium; Attendance: 10,000; Referee: Ammar Ammar (Lebanon)

24 May 1993 1994 FIFA World Cup qualification	Yemen	5–1	Pakistan	Irbid, Jordan
	Mubarak 20', 53'; Bareed 77'; Shadli 80'; Abdullah 82'	Report	Agha 12'	Stadium: Al-Hassan Stadium; Referee: Hossein Askari Milajerdi(Iran)

28 May 1993 1994 FIFA World Cup qualification	Pakistan	0–8	Iraq	Irbid, Jordan
		Report	Hussein 12'; Qais 21', 70'; A.Kadhim 27', 75'; Radhi 44'; Khalaf 77'; Saddam 88'	Stadium: Al-Hassan Stadium; Referee: Mohamed Al-Mulla Abdalaziz(United Arab Emirates))

30 May 1993 1994 FIFA World Cup qualification	Jordan	3–1	Pakistan	Irbid, Jordan
	Muharam 8', 89'; Abdul-Munam 90'	Report	A. Farooq 80'	Stadium: Al-Hassan Stadium; Referee: Jamal Al Sharif(Syria)

12 June 1993 1994 FIFA World Cup qualification	China	3–0	Pakistan	Chengdu, China
	Hongbo 60', 89'; Haidong 62'	Report		Stadium: Chengdu Sports Centre; Referee: Kim Jong Sik(North Korea)

14 June 1993 1994 FIFA World Cup qualification	Pakistan	0–3	Yemen	Chengdu, China
		Report	Al-Brid 39', 72'; Abdullah 77'	Stadium: Chengdu Sports Centre; Referee: An Bong-ki(South Korea)

18 June 1993 1994 FIFA World Cup qualification	Iraq	4–0	Pakistan	Chengdu, China
	Qais 16', 67'; Shenaishil 37'; Daham 64'	Report		Stadium: Chengdu Sports Centre; Referee: Kim Jong Sik(North Korea)

20 June 1993 1994 FIFA World Cup qualification	Pakistan	0–5	Jordan	Chengdu, China
		Report	Al-Gnimaz 14', 70'; Tadrus 28'; Muharam 43'; Al-Bashir 44'	Stadium: Chengdu Sports Centre; Referee: Santos Jose Manuel(Macau)

16 July 1993 1993 SAARC Gold G.S	Pakistan	1–1	Nepal	Lahore, Pakistan
	Ashfaq 60'	Report	Pradhan 85'	Stadium: Railway Stadium

18 July 1993 1993 SAARC Gold G.S	Pakistan	0–4	Sri Lanka	Lahore, Pakistan
		Report	Perera 13'; Silva; Amanullah 54', 72'	Stadium: Railway Stadium

23 July 1993 1993 SAARC Gold G.S	Pakistan	1–1	India	Lahore, Pakistan
	Nauman 47'	Report	Vijayan 90'	Stadium: Railway Stadium

20 December 1993 1993 South Asian Games G.S	Sri Lanka	2–1	Pakistan	Dhaka, Bangladesh
	PK Ranaweera 32', 35'	Report	Nauman 18'	Stadium: Mirpur Stadium

24 December 1993 1993 South Asian Games G.S	Pakistan	2–2	India	Dhaka, Bangladesh
	Nauman 49', 58'	Report	Bhupinder Thakur 43'; Tejinder Kumar 85'	Stadium: Dhaka Stadium

=== 1995 ===
25 March 1995 1995 South Asian Gold Cup G.S	Pakistan	1–0	Bangladesh	Colombo, Sri Lanka
	Iqbal 43'	Report		Stadium: Sugathadasa Stadium

29 March 1995 1995 South Asian Gold Cup G.S	Nepal	2–0	Pakistan	Colombo, Sri Lanka
	Maharajan 20'; Khadka 87'	Report		Stadium: Sugathadasa Stadium

=== 1996 ===
9 August 1996 1996 AFC Asian Cup qualification	Jordan	4–0	Pakistan	Amman, Jordan
	Al Fawzi 4', 17'; Ebritadahadeh 67'; Al Hallin 77'	Report

11 August 1996 1996 AFC Asian Cup qualification	Pakistan	0–3	Iraq	Amman, Jordan
		Report	Abbas 42'; Fawzi 65'; Shenaishil 67'

=== 1997 ===
11 May 1997 1998 FIFA World Cup qualification	Kazakhstan	3–0	Pakistan	Almaty, Kazakhstan
	Esmagambetov 2', 62'; Yablochkin 49'	Report		Stadium: Central Stadium; Attendance: 12,000; Referee: Allabergen Sapaev (Turkmenistan)

23 May 1997 1998 FIFA World Cup qualification	Pakistan	2–6	Iraq	Lahore, Pakistan
	Umer 8'; Rafiq 53'	Report	Fawzi 1', 62'; Chathir 35', 61'; Hussein 52'; Radhi 70'	Stadium: Railway Stadium; Attendance: 12,000; Referee: Sunil Senaweera (Sri Lanka)

11 June 1997 1998 FIFA World Cup qualification	Pakistan	0–7	Kazakhstan	Lahore, Pakistan
		Report	Esmagambetov 28'; Klishin 32'; Loginov 36'; Mazbaev 53'; Zubarev 64', 68', 72'	Stadium: Railway Stadium; Attendance: 3,500; Referee: Abbas Al Dashti Essa (Kuwait)

20 June 1997 1998 FIFA World Cup qualification	Iraq	6–1	Pakistan	Baghdad, Iraq
	Hussein 11', 26'; Fawzi 69', 76'; Abbas 71', 89'	Report	Umer 58'	Stadium: Al-Shaab Stadium; Attendance: 3,500; Referee: Ammar Ammar (Lebanon)

4 September 1997 1997 SAFF Gold Cup G.S	Nepal	0–2	Pakistan	Kathmandu, Nepal
		Report	Nauman 28'; Ejaz 68'	Stadium: Dasarath Rangasala Stadium

6 September 1997 1997 SAFF Gold Cup G.S	Sri Lanka	2–0	Pakistan	Kathmandu, Nepal
	Pereira 54'; Amanulla 86'	Report		Stadium: Dasarath Rangasala Stadium

11 September 1997 1997 SAFF Gold Cup S.F	India	2–0	Pakistan	Kathmandu, Nepal
	Vijayan 42', 76'	Report		Stadium: Dasarath Rangasala Stadium

13 September 1997 1997 SAFF Gold Cup Third Place	Pakistan	1–0	Sri Lanka	Kathmandu, Nepal
	Haseemdeen 76' (o.g.)	Report		Stadium: Dasarath Rangasala Stadium

=== 1999 ===
24 April 1999 1999 SAFF Gold Cup G.S.	Pakistan	0–4	Bangladesh	Goa, India
		Report	Iqbal 7'; Alfaz 33'; Dawn 62', 65'	Stadium: Jawaharlal Nehru Stadium

26 April 1999 1999 SAFF Gold Cup G.S.	India	2–0	Pakistan	Goa, India
	Bhutia 24'; Pasha 87'	Report		Stadium: Jawaharlal Nehru Stadium

26 September 1999 1999 South Asian Games G.S	India	5–2	Pakistan	Kathmandu, Nepal
	Alberto 8'; Pasha 12'; Vijayan 52', 61', 73' (pen.)	Report	Yousaf 76'; Zaman 90+1'	Stadium: Dasarath Rangasala Stadium

28 September 1999 1999 South Asian Games G.S	Nepal	3–1	Pakistan	Kathmandu, Nepal
	Ali 40' (o.g.); Khadka 61'; Maharjan 77'	Report	Zaman 53'	Stadium: Dasarath Rangasala Stadium

30 September 1999 1999 South Asian Games G.S	Pakistan	2–1	Bhutan	Kathmandu, Nepal
	Yousaf 61', 74'	Report	Chhetri 26'	Stadium: Dasarath Rangasala Stadium
