= 1996 President PFF Cup =

National Football Challenge Cup

Tournament details
- Country: Pakistan
- Venue: Quetta
- Dates: 16 August – 13 September
- Teams: 24 (total); 21 (participating, 3 teams withdrew)

Final positions
- Champions: Allied Bank (1st title)
- Runners-up: Pakistan Army
- Third place: WAPDA
- Fourth place: Karachi Electric Supply Corporation

Tournament statistics
- Matches played: 95
- Goals scored: 151 (1.59 per match)
- Top goal scorer: (Pakistan) Qazi Ashfaq (8 goals)

Awards
- Best player: Mohammad Shahbaz (Pakistan Army)

The 1996 President PFF Cup was the 10th edition of Pakistan National Football Challenge Cup. 24 teams qualified for the tournament but 3 withdrew as soon as the tournament started. Quetta hosted the tournament, commencing from 16 August 1996 – 13 September 1996.

Allied Bank won the tournament, defeating Pakistan Army 3–1 in the final, completing the double as they also won the National Football Championship the same year.

== Teams ==
A total of 24 teams participated in the team. General Fans won the previous tournament, held in 1994. But they did not participated in the 1996 edition.

=== Groups ===
Group stage
Allied Bank	Karachi Development Authority	Pakistan Airforce	Pakistan Public Work Department
Muslim Commercial Bank	Pakistan Police	Pakistan Railways	Quetta Metropolitan Corporation
~~Hinopak~~ *	Pakistan Army	Pakistan Telecommunications	Sui Southern Gas
Balochistan Agriculture Department	Khan Research Laboratories	National Bank	Pakistan Navy
Pakistan Automobile Corporation	Pakistan International Airlines	Pat Feeder Project	Port Qasim Authority
Habib Bank	Ordinance Depot Quetta	Sindh Government Press	State Bank of Pakistan
~~Building & Road Department~~ *	Karachi Electric Supply Corporation	~~University Grants Commission~~ *	WAPDA
Balochistan Secretariat	House Building Finance Corporation	Karachi Metropolitan Corporation	Karachi Port Trust

- * Withdrew

== Group stage ==
=== Group A ===
Pos	Team	Pld	W	D	L	GF	GA	GD	Pts	Qualification
1	Allied Bank	3	3	0	0	8	2	+6	9	Advance to Knockout round
2	Pakistan Airforce	3	2	1	0	3	1	+2	7	Advance to Knockout round
3	Pakistan Public Work Department	3	1	0	2	6	4	+2	3	
4	Karachi Development Authority	3	0	0	3	2	12	−10	0	

Updated to match(es) played on 24 November 2003. Source: RSSSF
16 August 1996
14:30 (UTC+5)

Pakistan Public Work Department	5–1	Karachi Development Authority
Tariq Umar (?); Ramzan (?)	Report	Prem Chand (?)

16 August 1996
14:30 (UTC+5)

Allied Bank	1–0	Pakistan Airforce
M. Bashir (?)	Report

Jinnah Sports Stadium, Islamabad

20 August 1996
14:30 (UTC+5)

Pakistan Airforce	1–0	Pakistan Public Work Department
M. Zameer (?)	Report

20 August 1996
14:30 (UTC+5)

Allied Bank	5–1	Karachi Development Authority
Ashfaq (?); Shakil (?)	Report	Wazir Ali (?)

24 August 1996
14:30 (UTC+5)

Pakistan Airforce	2–0	Karachi Development Authority
Tahir Mehmood (?); Javed (?)	Report

24 August 1996
14:30 (UTC+5)

Allied Bank	2–1	Pakistan Public Work Department
Ashfaq (?); M. Bashir (?)	Report	Ayub Taj (?)

=== Group B ===
Pos	Team	Pld	W	D	L	GF	GA	GD	Pts	Qualification
1	Muslim Commercial Bank	3	2	1	0	6	2	+4	7	Advance to Knockout round
2	Pakistan Railways	3	1	2	0	4	3	+1	5	Advance to Knockout round
3	Quetta Metropolitan Corporation	3	1	1	1	8	6	+2	4	
4	Pakistan Police	3	0	0	3	3	10	−7	0	

Updated to match(es) played on 24 November 2003. Source: RSSSF
16 August 1996
14:30 (UTC+5)

Quetta Metropolitan Corporation	6–2	Pakistan Police
Aslam Shah (?); Ghulam Nabi (?)	Report	Mairaj Akhter (?); M. Shafiq (?)

16 August 1996
14:30 (UTC+5)

Pakistan Railways	1–1	Muslim Commercial Bank
Israr Hussain (?)	Report	Saleem (?)

Jinnah Sports Stadium, Islamabad

20 August 1996
14:30 (UTC+5)

Muslim Commercial Bank	2–0	Quetta Metropolitan Corporation
M. Zafar (?); M. Bashir (?)	Report

20 August 1996
14:30 (UTC+5)

Pakistan Railways	1–0	Pakistan Police
Israr Hussain (?)	Report

24 August 1996
14:30 (UTC+5)

Muslim Commercial Bank	3–1	Pakistan Police
Imam Bux (?); M. Zafar (?); Saleem (?)	Report	Bakhtawar (?)

24 August 1996
14:30 (UTC+5)

Quetta Metropolitan Corporation	2–2	Pakistan Railways
Jalal Qazi (?)	Report	Salim Yousuf (?); Burhan Ali (?)

=== Group C ===
Pos	Team	Pld	W	D	L	GF	GA	GD	Pts	Qualification
1	Pakistan Army	2	1	1	0	7	2	+5	4	Advance to Knockout round
2	Pakistan Telecommunications	2	1	1	0	5	4	+1	4	Advance to Knockout round
3	Sui Southern Gas	2	0	0	2	2	8	−6	0	
4	~~Hinopak~~ *	0	0	0	0	0	0	0	0	

Updated to match(es) played on 24 November 2003. Source: RSSSF
17 August 1996
14:30 (UTC+5)

Pakistan Telecommunications	3–2	Sui Southern Gas
M. Mehdi (?); Talib (?); Ali Ahmed (?)	Report	Pervez (?); M. Karim (?)

21 August 1996
14:30 (UTC+5)

Pakistan Army	5–0	Sui Southern Gas
M. Shahbaz (?); Mayor Jan (?); Babar Mehmood (?)	Report

25 August 1996
14:30 (UTC+5)

Pakistan Army	2–2	Pakistan Telecommunications
M. Shahbaz (?); Sattar (?)	Report	M. Mehdi (?); Shahid (?)

=== Group D ===
Pos	Team	Pld	W	D	L	GF	GA	GD	Pts	Qualification
1	National Bank	3	1	2	0	7	2	+5	5	Advance to Knockout round
2	Pakistan Navy	3	1	2	0	4	3	+1	5	Advance to Knockout round
3	Khan Research Laboratories	3	1	1	1	5	4	+1	4	
4	Balochistan Agriculture Department	3	0	1	2	4	11	−7	1	

Updated to match(es) played on 24 November 2003. Source: RSSSF
18 August 1996
14:30 (UTC+5)

National Bank	5–0	Balochistan Agriculture Department
Zafri (?); Shamim Akhter (?); Ismail (?)	Report

18 August 1996
14:30 (UTC+5)

Pakistan Navy	1–0	Khan Research Laboratories
Z. Ahmed (?)	Report

22 August 1996
14:30 (UTC+5)

Pakistan Navy	2–2	Balochistan Agriculture Department
Naik Muhammad (?); Z. Ahmed (?)	Report	M. Zahir (?); M. Hanif (?)

22 August 1996
14:30 (UTC+5)

National Bank	1–1	Khan Research Laboratories
Asghar Sr. (?)	Report	Jahanzeb (?)

26 August 1996
14:30 (UTC+5)

Pakistan Navy	1–1	National Bank
Z. Ahmed (?)	Report	Nasir Ali (?)

26 August 1996
14:30 (UTC+5)

Khan Research Laboratories	4–2	Balochistan Agriculture Department
Shahid (?); Hameed Khan (?); Sajjad Hussain (?)	Report	Abdullah (?); Qadir Shah (?)

=== Group E ===
Pos	Team	Pld	W	D	L	GF	GA	GD	Pts	Qualification
1	Pakistan Airlines	3	3	0	0	12	0	+12	9	Advance to Knockout round
2	Pakistan Automobile Corporation	3	2	0	1	5	7	−2	6	Advance to Knockout round
3	Port Qasim Authority	3	1	0	2	2	8	−6	3	
4	Pat Feeder Project	3	0	0	3	1	5	−4	0	

Updated to match(es) played on 24 November 2003. Source: RSSSF
19 August 1996
14:30 (UTC+5)

Port Qasim Authority	1–0	Pat Feeder Project
Gul Hussain (?)	Report

19 August 1996
14:30 (UTC+5)

Pakistan Airlines	5–0	Pakistan Automobile Corporation
Niaz (?); Naseem Akhter (?); Abid (?); Wahid (?)	Report

23 August 1996
14:30 (UTC+5)

Pakistan Automobile Corporation	2–1	Port Qasim Authority
M. Khalid (?); Aftab Ahmed (?)	Report	M. Rasheed (?)

23 August 1996
14:30 (UTC+5)

Pakistan Airlines	1–0	Pat Feeder Project
M. Umar (?)	Report

27 August 1996
14:30 (UTC+5)

Pakistan Airlines	6–0	Port Qasim Authority
Zaman (?); M. Umar (?); A. Rehman (?); Naseem Akhter (?); Abid (?)	Report

27 August 1996
14:30 (UTC+5)

Pakistan Automobile Corporation	2–1	Pat Feeder Project
M. Khalid (?); Aftab Ahmed (?)	Report	M. Rasheed (?)

=== Group F ===
Pos	Team	Pld	W	D	L	GF	GA	GD	Pts	Qualification
1	Sindh Government Press	3	2	1	0	14	1	+13	7	Advance to Knockout round
2	Habib Bank	3	2	1	0	2	0	+2	7	Advance to Knockout round
3	Ordinance Depot Quetta	3	1	0	2	5	7	−2	3	
4	State Bank of Pakistan	3	0	0	3	1	14	−13	0	

Updated to match(es) played on 24 November 2003. Source: RSSSF
20 August 1996
14:30 (UTC+5)

Ordinance Depot Quetta	4–1	State Bank of Pakistan
Azam (?); M. Iqbal (?)	Report	Arshad Jameel (?)

20 August 1996
14:30 (UTC+5)

Habib Bank	0–0	Sindh Government Press
	Report

24 August 1996
14:30 (UTC+5)

Sindh Government Press	10–0	State Bank of Pakistan
Asif (?); Essa (?); Zulfiqar (?); Allah Bux (?)	Report

24 August 1996
14:30 (UTC+5)

Habib Bank	2–0	Ordinance Depot Quetta
Pervaiz (?); Ibrahim (?)	Report

28 August 1996
14:30 (UTC+5)

Sindh Government Press	4–1	Ordinance Depot Quetta
Essa (?); Asif (?); Allah Bux (?)	Report	M. Iqbal (?)

28 August 1996
14:30 (UTC+5)

Habib Bank	w/o	State Bank of Pakistan
	Report

=== Group G ===
Pos	Team	Pld	W	D	L	GF	GA	GD	Pts	Qualification
1	Karachi Electric Supply Corporation	1	0	1	0	0	0	0	1	Advance to Knockout round
2	WAPDA	1	0	1	0	0	0	0	1	Advance to Knockout round
3	~~Building & Road Department~~*	0	0	0	0	0	0	0	0	
4	~~University Grants Commission~~*	0	0	0	0	0	0	0	0	

Updated to match(es) played on 24 November 2003. Source: RSSSF
21 August 1996
14:30 (UTC+5)

WAPDA	0–0	Karachi Electric Supply Corporation
	Report

=== Group H ===
Pos	Team	Pld	W	D	L	GF	GA	GD	Pts	Qualification
1	Karachi Port Trust	3	2	1	0	10	0	+10	7	Advance to Knockout round
2	Karachi Metropolitan Corporation	3	1	2	0	3	2	+1	5	Advance to Knockout round
3	House Building Finance Corporation	3	1	1	1	1	5	−4	4	
4	Balochistan Secretariat	3	0	0	3	2	9	−7	0	

Updated to match(es) played on 24 November 2003. Source: RSSSF
22 August 1996
14:30 (UTC+5)

Balochistan Secretariat	0–1	House Building Finance Corporation
	Report	Ashraf (?)

22 August 1996
14:30 (UTC+5)

Karachi Port Trus	0–0	Karachi Metropolitan Corporation
	Report

26 August 1996
14:30 (UTC+5)

Karachi Metropolitan Corporation	3–2	Balochistan Secretariat
Hanif Patni (?); A. Ghafoor (?); Bakht Rehmna (?)	Report	Haider Shah (?)

26 August 1996
14:30 (UTC+5)

Karachi Port Trust	5–0	House Building Finance Corporation
Khaliq (?); Saleem Arab (?); Ghulam Farooq (?)	Report

30 August 1996
14:30 (UTC+5)

Karachi Metropolitan Corporation	0–0	House Building Finance Corporation
	Report

30 August 1996
14:30 (UTC+5)

Karachi Port Trust	5–0	Balochistan Secretariat
Amin (?); Khaliq (?); Ghulam Farooq (?)	Report

== Knockout round ==
In knockout stages, 2 matches will be played simultaneously therefore one match was played in Quetta while other in Loralai.

=== Round of 16 ===
1 September 1996
14:30 (UTC+5)

Allied Bank	5–2	Pakistan Railways
Ashfaq (?); Zakariya (?); Shakil (?)	Report	Burhan Ali (?); Tariq (?)

1 September 1996
14:30 (UTC+5)

Muslim Commercial Bank	0–1	Pakistan Airforce
	Report	Arshad (?)

2 September 1996
14:30 (UTC+5)

Pakistan Airlines	1–0	Habib Bank
Niaz 72'	Report

2 September 1996
14:30 (UTC+5)

Sindh Government Press	0–0 (a.e.t.)	Pakistan Automobile Corporation
	Report
Penalties
	4–3

3 September 1996
14:30 (UTC+5)

Pakistan Army	3–0	Pakistan Navy
Mayor Jan (?); M. Shahbaz (?); Babar Mehmood (?)	Report

3 September 1996
14:30 (UTC+5)

National Bank	3–0	Pakistan Telecommunications
Nasir Ali (?); Shamim Akhter (?); Zafri (?)	Report

4 September 1996
14:30 (UTC+5)

Karachi Port Trust	0–0 (a.e.t.)	WAPDA
	Report
Penalties
	3–4

4 September 1996
14:30 (UTC+5)

Karachi Metropolitan Corporation	0–3	Karachi Electric Supply Corporation
	Report	Habib (?); Ashraf (?); Ilyas (?)

=== Quarter finals ===
6 September 1996
14:30 (UTC+5)

Allied Bank	3–0	Pakistan Airforce
Zakariya (?); Bashir (?); Ashfaq (?)	Report

6 September 1996
14:30 (UTC+5)

Pakistan Airlines	2–1	Sindh Government Press
Gohar Zaman (?); Asif (?)	Report	Anwar Saeed (?)

7 September 1996
14:30 (UTC+5)

Pakistan Army	2–0	National Bank
M. Shahbaz (?); Mayor Jan (?)	Report

7 September 1996
14:30 (UTC+5)

WAPDA	4–0	Karachi Electric Supply Corporation
Butt (?); Shahid (?); Rashid (?)	Report

=== Semi finals ===
9 September 1996
14:30 (UTC+5)

Pakistan Army	1–1 (a.e.t.)	WAPDA
Mayor Jan (?)	Report	Zubair Ahmed (?)
Penalties
	3–1

10 September 1996
14:30 (UTC+5)

Pakistan Airlines	0–1	Allied Bank
	Report	Haroon Yousaf (?)

=== Finals ===
13 September 1996
14:30 (UTC+5)

Allied Bank	3–1	Pakistan Army
Ashfaq (?); Yousaf (?); Zakariya (?)	Report	Sattar (?)

== Statistics ==
=== Top goalscorers ===
As of 13 September 1996

Rank	Player	Team	Goals
1	Qazi Ashfaq	Allied Bank	8
2	Mohammad Shahbaz	Pakistan Army	6
2	Muhammad Asif	Sindh Government Press	6
4	Essa Khan	Sindh Government Press	5
4	Abdul Khaliq	Karachi Port Trust	5
6	Tariq Umar	Pakistan Public Work Department	4
6	Amjad Zakariya	Allied Bank	4
6	Mayor Jan	Pakistan Army	4
6	Zafri	National Bank	4
