= Haroon Yousaf =

Pakistani footballer (born 1973)

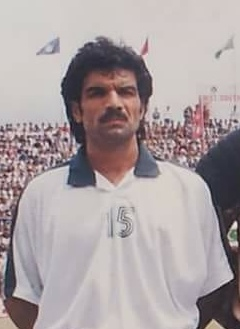
- Yousaf with Pakistan during the 1997 SAFF Gold Cup

Personal information
- Full name: Haroon Yousaf
- Date of birth: 10 November 1973 (age 52)
- Place of birth: Mandi Bahauddin, Pakistan
- Height: 1.70 m (5 ft 7 in)
- Positions: Midfielder; defender

Youth career
- Allah-o-Akbar Club
- City FC

Senior career*
Years	Team	Apps	(Gls)
1990–1991	Pakistan Railways		
1991–1995	WAPDA		
1993	→ Defence FC (loan)		
1995–2004	Allied Bank		
2006-2007	Afghan Chaman		
2007–2013	PMC Athletico		

International career
1992	Pakistan U20	4	(0)
1995–2002	Pakistan U23	7 (Note: Appearances as an overage player (three appearances in 2002 Asian Games))	(0)
1992–2003	Pakistan	49	(3)
- * Club domestic league appearances and goals

Haroon Yousaf (born 10 November 1973) is a Pakistani former footballer. He played as a midfielder and defender. A former captain of the Pakistan national team, Yousaf played 49 full internationals for Pakistan between 1992 and 2003 and scored 3 goals. He was praised for his defensive abilities and leadership.

== Early life ==
Yousaf was born on 10 November 1973 in Mandi Bahauddin, in the Punjab province of Pakistan. He was introduced to football by PTCL coach Inamullah, and also received training from former national captain Riasat Ali.

== Club career ==
=== Early career ===
Yousaf played for Lahore clubs Allah-o-Akbar, and City FC in his youth. He also played briefly for departmental teams of PTCL and Pakistan Airlines, but his stay there did not last because of internal problems within the departments and housing issues. In 1993, Yousuf also featured in the National Youth Football Championship.

=== Railways ===
In 1990, Yousaf joined departmental side of Pakistan Railways.

=== WAPDA ===
In 1991, Yousaf transferred to the departmental side WAPDA and stayed there for five years. Yousaf won the National Football Championship once with WAPDA in 1991. He played in the 1991 Asian Club Championship qualifying round against Dhaka Mohammedan.

Yousaf also represented Defence Club at the 1993–94 Asian Club Championship qualifying round against Oman Club.

=== Allied Bank ===
In 1995, he moved to the Allied Bank Limited football team, where he became captain in 1997. He won consecutive National Football Championship titles in 1997, 1999 and 2000. He also won the President PFF Cup four times with Allied Bank in 1996, 1998, 1999 and 2002.

He was offered a playing contract from the Indian football team Mahindra United, but the Pakistan Football Federation seemingly turned it down.

He played with the club until its disbandment during the 2004 Pakistan Premier League.

=== Afghan Chaman ===
In the gap after his team got disbanded, Yousaf played a short while for Afghan Chaman.

=== PMC Athletico Faisalabad ===
Yousaf became one of the founder members of PMC Club Athletico Faisalabad, remaining as captain of the team. In the 2010–11 Pakistan Premier League, he played a crucial role in surviving the relegation despite his age being more than 37 years old, after scoring last-minute penalty goal in a 2–1 victory against Baloch Nushki, allowing PMC Athletico the needful three points and to prevent the relegation. He also inspired the team from the brink of relegation by beating hosts Afghan FC Chaman by 1–0 in final game of the season.

He last played in the 2012–13 Pakistan Premier League, until the club was eventually relegated.

== International career ==
Yousaf got selected by the Pakistan under-19 national team for the 1992 AFC Youth Championship qualifiers in Kannur, India.

Yousaf made his senior international debut at the 1992 Jordan International Tournament against Moldova. The next year, he featured at the 1994 FIFA World Cup qualification, 1993 SAARC Gold Cup, and the 1993 South Asian Games.

Two years later, he played at the 1995 SAARC Gold Cup. In 1995, he was selected as captain for the Pakistan Olympic team for the 1996 Summer Olympics qualifiers.

He was declared man of the match in the 1996 AFC Asian Cup qualifiers in Jordan when Pakistan lost 0–3 against Iraq but he was praised for his defending performance. In 1997, he fetaured at the 1998 FIFA World Cup qualification, and the 1997 SAFF Gold Cup, where he helped the national team achieve the bronze after defeating Sri Lanka in the third place match.

From 1996 till 1999, Yousaf was vice-captain of the Pakistan national team after Qazi Ashfaq and since 1999 SAFF Gold Cup which was held in Goa, he became the captain. He remained captain of the national side in several events including 1999 South Asian Games, 2000 AFC Asian Cup qualification, 2002 FIFA World Cup qualification, 2003 SAFF Gold Cup, and the 2004 AFC Asian Cup qualification in 2003 where he played his last game against Singapore. In March 2001, he led the team during Pakistan's tour to England in matches against Bury and Coventry City. He also captained the national under 23 team as three of the allowed overage players at the 2002 Asian Games.

Yousaf was dropped from the squad for the 2006 FIFA World Cup qualification in November 2003 against Kyrgyzstan by the Pakistan Football Federation Selection Committee due to his declining form, on the contrary head coach Tariq Lutfi insisted on retaining him, controversially and allegedly naming Yousaf as the captain while the squad was even not announced. Yousaf was eventually replaced as captain for goalkeeper Jaffar Khan for the tournament.

== Coaching career ==
In November 2009, Yousaf completed the AFC C Certificate football coaching course from Iranian coach Ardeshir Pournemat in Lahore.

In February 2011, he became the head coach of PMC Athletico Club Faisalabad under-13 football team for coming 13th National under-13 Festival of Football in Pakistan.

Yousaf was initially named as one of the assistant coaches of the Pakistan under-23 team for the 2019 South Asian Games under head coach Tariq Lutfi, but the national side missed the event as the country's entry was not confirmed by the organisers of the biennial spectacle due to late submission. In 2020, he was appointed head coach of the Punjab team for the Chief Minister Gold Cup Football Tournament in Quetta.

== Personal life ==
Haroon has five brothers and seven sisters and he is the second oldest of his brothers. One of his brothers, Iqbal Yousaf played in the Punjab football team at the National Football Championship as defender. His favourite footballers are Diego Maradona and Roberto Baggio, and his then national teammates Qazi Ashfaq and Sharafat Ali. He cited Muhammad Aslam Japani as his favourite coach. He got married in 1998 and has three daughters.

He received the AFC Silver Star Award by the Asian Football Confederation in 2013 for his contributions to the national team.

== Career statistics ==
=== International ===
Appearances and goals by national team and year
National team	Year	Apps	Goals
Pakistan	1992	2	0
Pakistan	1993	13	0
Pakistan	1995	2	0
Pakistan	1996	2	0
Pakistan	1997	8	0
Pakistan	1999	5	3
Pakistan	2000	4	0
Pakistan	2001	6	0
Pakistan	2003	7	0
Total		49	3

Scores and results list Pakistan's goal tally first, score column indicates score after each Yousaf goal.

List of international goals scored by Haroon Yousaf
No.	Date	Venue	Opponent	Score	Result	Competition
1	26 September 1999	Dasharath Rangasala Stadium, Kathmandu, Nepal	India	1–5	2–5	1999 South Asian Games
2	30 September 1999	Dasharath Rangasala Stadium, Kathmandu, Nepal	Bhutan	1–1	2–1	1999 South Asian Games
3	30 September 1999	Dasharath Rangasala Stadium, Kathmandu, Nepal	Bhutan	2–1	2–1	1999 South Asian Games

== Honours ==
WAPDA

- National Football Championship: 1991

Allied Bank

- National Football Championship: 1997 (1), 1999, 2000
- President PFF Cup: 1996, 1998, 1999, 2002

== See also ==
- List of Pakistan national football team captains
