= Amjad Zakariya =

Pakistani footballer (born 1971)

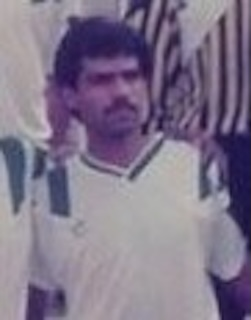
- Zakariya with Pakistan A during the 1993 ECO Cup

Personal information
- Full name: Amjad Zakariya
- Date of birth: 15 May 1971 (age 55)
- Place of birth: Kabirwala, Pakistan
- Position: Forward

Senior career*
| Years | Team | Apps | (Gls) |
- WAPDA
| 1995–2004 | Allied Bank | | |

International career
| 1993 | Pakistan A | 2 | (0) |
| 1996–1997 | Pakistan | | |
- * Club domestic league appearances and goals

Amjad Zakariya (Urdu: امجد زکریا; born 15 May 1971) is a Pakistani former footballer who played as a forward for the Pakistan national football team.

== Early life ==
Zakariya hails from Kabirwala in the Khanewal district of Pakistan.

== Club career ==
Zakariya first played for WAPDA, and later joined Allied Bank in 1995. In 1996, he helped Allied Bank win the 1996 President PFF Cup playing an important role in their triumph, scoring four goals throughout the tournament and also finding the net in the final. He also won several National Football Championship titles with Allied Bank.

== International career ==
In June 1993, the Pakistan Football Federation sent an alternate team, designated as "Pakistan A" which included Zakariya, to the 1993 ECO Cup held in Tehran, Iran, while the main national team was participating in the 1994 FIFA World Cup qualifiers. He played against Iran and Turkmenistan in the tournament.

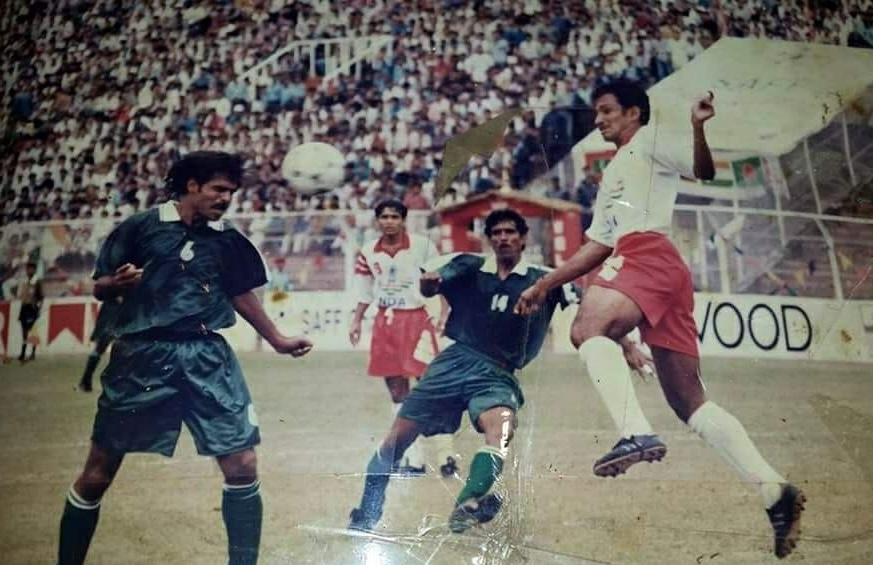
Amjad Zakariya (on the left) heading the ball.

Zakariya would go on to feature with the Pakistan national team in tournaments such as 1996 Asian Cup qualifiers, 1998 World Cup qualifiers, and the 1997 SAFF Gold Cup where Pakistan achieved a third-place finish.

== Honours ==
=== Allied Bank ===
- National Football Championship:
  - Champions (3): 1997, 1999, 2000
  - Runners-up: 1995
- President PFF Cup
  - Winners (4): 1996, 1998, 1999, 2002
