= Muhammad Younis (footballer) =

Pakistani former footballer

Personal information
- Full name: Muhammad Younis
- Date of birth: 1 November 1974 (age 51)
- Place of birth: Rawalpindi, Pakistan

Senior career*
Years	Team	Apps	(Gls)
1993–1997	Pakistan Army		
1997–2000	Allied Bank		

International career
1995–1999	Pakistan	11	(0)
- * Club domestic league appearances and goals

Muhammad Younis (Urdu: محمد یونس; born 1 November 1974), is a Pakistani former footballer who played as a goalkeeper. Younis also played for the Pakistan national team in the late 1990s.

== Club career ==
Younis played for Pakistan Army, helping them win the National Football Championship in 1993–94 and 1995.

Before joining Allied Bank, also being a key part in their National Football Championship titles, securing the 1997, 1999, and 2000 editions of the tournament. As well as helping them win back-to-back PFF Cup titles (1998, 1999).

== International career ==
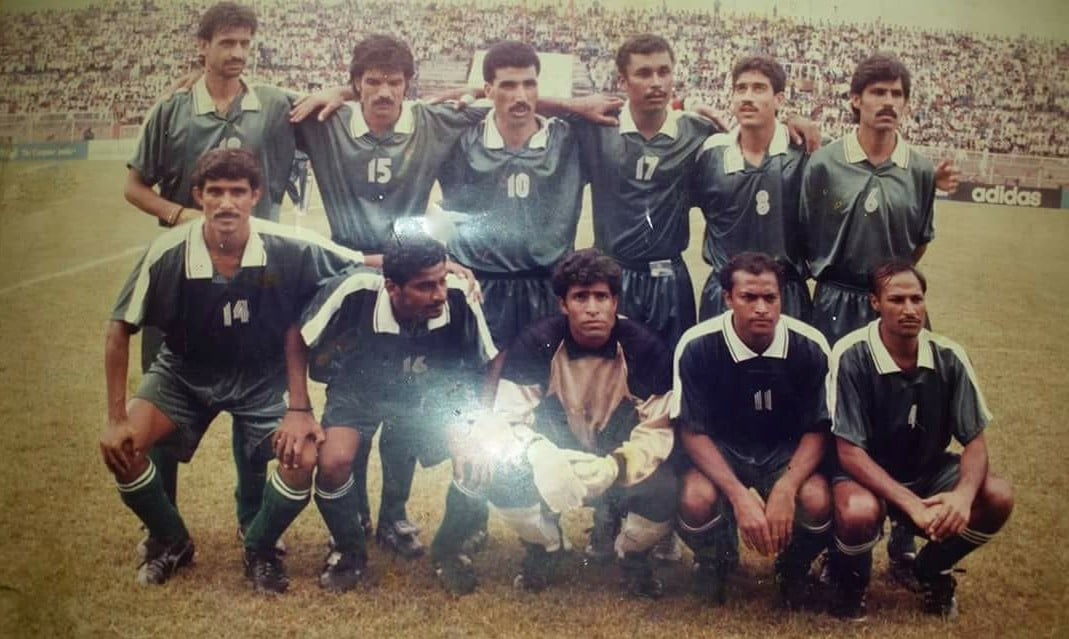
Younis sitting in the middle with Pakistan in 1997.

In 1995, Younis was called up to the Pakistan senior team for the 1995 SAARC Gold Cup held in Colombo, Sri Lanka. He also played at the 1997 SAFF Gold Cup and the 1999 SAFF Gold Cup. Notably being awarded the Man Of The Match in the game between Pakistan and Sri Lanka in the 1997 SAFF Gold Cup. As well as the game between Pakistan and India in the 1999 SAFF Gold Cup.

Younis also participated with Pakistan at the 1998 FIFA World Cup qualification.

== Honours ==
=== Pakistan Army ===
- National Football Championship
  - Winners (2): 1993–94, 1995

=== Allied Bank ===
- National Football Championship:
  - Champions (3): 1997, 1999, 2000
