= 1999 President PFF Cup =

National Football Challenge Cup

Tournament details
- Country: Pakistan
- Venue(s): Government High School, Chaman
- Dates: 10 October 1999 – 27 October 1999
- Teams: 24 (total); 21 (participating, 3 teams withdrew)

Final positions
- Champions: Allied Bank (3rd title)
- Runners-up: Khan Research Laboratories

Tournament statistics
- Matches played: 33
- Goals scored: 79 (2.39 per match)
- Top goal scorer: Pervaiz Ahmed (5 goals)

Awards
- Player of the Tournament: Sarfraz Rasool

The 1999 President PFF Cup was the 12th edition of Pakistan National Football Challenge Cup. It ran from 10 October till 27 October 1999, and held at Government High School in Chaman, Balochistan.

Defending champions Allied Bank won the tournament, defeating Khan Research Laboratories through penalty shootout after a draw.

== Group stage ==
=== Group A ===
Pos	Team	Pld	W	D	L	GF	GA	GD	Pts	Qualification
1	Allied Bank	1	1	0	0	2	1	+1	3	Advance to Knockout round
2	Pakistan Police	1	0	0	1	1	2	−1	0	Advance to Knockout round
3	~~Ordnance Department~~ *	0	0	0	0	0	0	0	0	

Source: RSSSF
1999

Allied Bank	2–1	Pakistan Police
Ashfaq; Ejaz Gosha	Report	Aslam Shah

=== Group B ===
Pos	Team	Pld	W	D	L	GF	GA	GD	Pts	Qualification
1	Pakistan Telecommunications	1	0	1	0	0	0	0	1	Advance to Knockout round
2	Pakistan Army	1	0	1	0	0	0	0	1	Advance to Knockout round
3	~~Sindh Government Press~~ *	0	0	0	0	0	0	0	0	

Source: RSSSF
1999

Pakistan Army	0–0	Pakistan Telecommunications
	Report

=== Group C ===
Pos	Team	Pld	W	D	L	GF	GA	GD	Pts	Qualification
1	Chaman Trading Company	2	1	1	0	4	2	+2	4	Advance to Knockout round
2	National Bank	2	0	2	0	2	2	0	2	Advance to Knockout round
3	Pakistan Navy	2	0	1	1	2	4	−2	1	

Source: RSSSF
1999

Chaman Trading	3–1	Pakistan Navy
Marshal; Haji Mohammad	Report	Muhammad Yousuf

1999

National Bank	1–1	Pakistan Navy
Ismail	Report	Zahir

1999

National Bank	1–1	Chaman Trading Company
Sattar Mansoori	Report	Marshal

=== Group D ===
Pos	Team	Pld	W	D	L	GF	GA	GD	Pts	Qualification
1	Karachi Port Trust	2	2	0	0	5	2	+3	6	Advance to Knockout round
2	Baldia Quetta	2	1	0	1	1	2	−1	3	Advance to Knockout round
3	Pakistan Automobil Corporation	2	0	0	2	2	4	−2	0	

Source: RSSSF
1999

Karachi Port Trust	2–0	Baldia Quetta
Rauf Rehman; Arshad Ali	Report

1999

Baldia Quetta	1–0	Pakistan Automobil Corporation
Naseebullah	Report

1999

Karachi Port Trust	3–2	Pakistan Automobil Corporation
Majeed; Amin	Report	Karm Bakhsh; Anwer

=== Group E ===
Pos	Team	Pld	W	D	L	GF	GA	GD	Pts	Qualification
1	Sui Southern Gas	2	1	1	0	2	0	+2	4	Advance to Knockout round
2	Pakistan International Airlines	2	0	2	0	1	1	0	2	Advance to Knockout round
3	Karachi Metropolitan Corporation	2	0	1	1	1	3	−2	1	

Source: RSSSF
1999

Pakistan International Airlines	0–0	Sui Southern Gas
	Report

1999

Sui Southern Gas	2–0	Karachi Metropolitan Corporation
M. Hussain; Mohammad Siddique Sr.	Report

1999

Pakistan International Airlines	1–1	Karachi Metropolitan Corporation
Niaz	Report	Ghulam Habib

=== Group F ===
Pos	Team	Pld	W	D	L	GF	GA	GD	Pts	Qualification
1	KESC	1	0	1	0	1	1	0	1	Advance to Knockout round
2	Pakistan Air Force	1	0	1	0	1	1	0	1	Advance to Knockout round
3	~~Crescent Textile Mills~~ *	0	0	0	0	0	0	0	0	

Source: RSSSF
1999

Pakistan Air Force	1–1	KESC
Arshad	Report	Ahmed

=== Group G ===
Pos	Team	Pld	W	D	L	GF	GA	GD	Pts	Qualification
1	Khan Research Laboratories	2	1	1	0	1	0	+1	4	Advance to Knockout round
2	WAPDA	2	1	1	0	1	0	+1	4	Advance to Knockout round
3	Afghan Agency Chaman	2	0	0	2	0	2	−2	0	

Source: RSSSF
1999

Khan Research Laboratories	1–0	Afghan Agency
Sajjad Hussain	Report

1999

WAPDA	1–0	Afghan Agency
Sikandar Shah	Report

1999

WAPDA	0–0	Khan Research Laboratories
	Report

=== Group H ===
Pos	Team	Pld	W	D	L	GF	GA	GD	Pts	Qualification
1	Pakistan Railways	2	2	0	0	1	0	+1	6	Advance to Knockout round
2	Habib Bank	2	1	0	1	8	1	+7	3	Advance to Knockout round
3	Agha Gas Company	2	0	0	2	0	8	−8	0	

Source: RSSSF
1999

Habib Bank	8–0	Agha Gas Company
Pervaiz Ahmed; Shakir; Bashir	Report

1999

Pakistan Railways	1–0	Habib Bank
Aziz	Report

1999

Pakistan Railways	w/o	Agha Gas Company
	Report

== Knockout round ==
=== Round of 16 ===
1999

WAPDA	2–2	Sui Southern Gas
Khalid	Report	Khan; Siddiq
Penalties
	5–4

1999

Khan Research Laboratories	2–1 (a.e.t.)	Pakistan Airlines
Mehdi; Sajjad Hussain	Report	Mohammad Omar

1999

Pakistan Railways	1–0	Pakistan Air Force
Saeed Junior	Report

1999

Habib Bank Limited	2–2	KESC
Bashir; Shahid	Report	Ahmed; Ikhlaq
Penalties
	3–1

1999

Pakistan Telecommunications	1–0	Baldia Quetta
Tahir Kramat	Report

1999

Allied Bank	7–1	National Bank
Zaman; Ashfaq; Talib	Report	Talib

1999

Pakistan Army	3–1	Karachi Port Trust
Babar Mahmood; Jamil Gill	Report	Rauf

1999

Pakistan Police	3–2	Chaman Trading Company
Sadiq; Naseebullah	Report	Hayatullah; Saadullah

=== Quarter finals ===
1999

Khan Research Laboratories	2–0	Pakistan Railways
Allah Nawaz	Report

1999

Habib Bank	1–1	WAPDA
Arshad Jamal	Report	Ghulam Mustafa

1999

Allied Bank	1–0	Pakistan Telecommunications
Ejaz Gosha	Report

1999

Pakistan Army	1–0	Pakistan Police
Jamil Gill	Report

=== Semi finals ===
1999

Khan Research Laboratories	4–1	Habib Bank
Mehdi; Jehanzeb; Sajjad Hussain	Report	Shahid

1999

Allied Bank	0–0	Pakistan Army
	Report
Penalties
	3–1

=== Finals ===
1999

Allied Bank	1–1	Khan Research Laboratories
Khuda Bakhsh	Report	Sajjad Hussain
Penalties
	5–4

== Statistics ==
=== Top goalscorers ===
Rank	Player	Team	Goals
1	Pervaiz Ahmed	Habib Bank	5
2	Sajjad Hussain	Khan Research Laboratories	4
3	Gohar Zaman	Allied Bank	3
3	Qazi Ashfaq	Allied Bank	3
3	Marshal	Chaman Trading	3
3	Mehdi	Khan Research Laboratories	3
