= Qazi Ashfaq =

Pakistani footballer

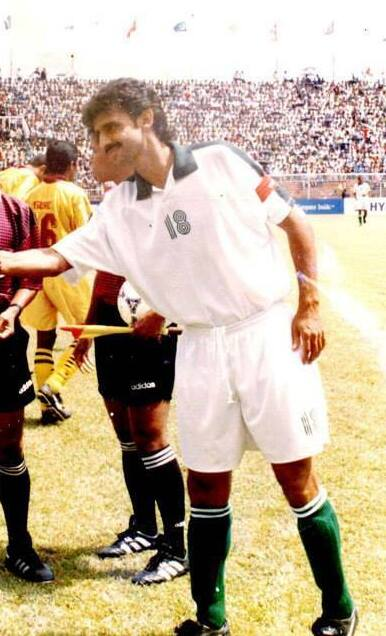
- Ashfaq before the match between Sri Lanka and Pakistan at the 1997 SAFF Gold Cup

Personal information
- Full name: Qazi Muhammad Ashfaq
- Date of birth: 12 December 1967
- Place of birth: Hasan Abdal, Pakistan
- Date of death: 13 November 2001 (aged 33)
- Place of death: Lahore, Pakistan
- Position: Striker

Youth career
- Karwan Club

Senior career*
Years	Team	Apps	(Gls)
1989–1990	Wohaib		
1990–1996	WAPDA		
1996–2000	Allied Bank		

International career
1991–1995	Pakistan U23		
1989–1997	Pakistan	30	(4)
Medal record
Men's football
Representing Pakistan
South Asian Games
Gold medal – first place	1989 Islamabad	Team competition
Gold medal – first place	1991 Colombo	Team competition
- * Club domestic league appearances and goals

Qazi Muhammad Ashfaq (Urdu: قاضی محمد اشفاق; 12 December 1967 – 13 November 2001) was a Pakistani footballer who played as a striker and captained the Pakistan national team. Considered one of the best Pakistani footballers of his generation, he was praised for his skill, speed, and leadership in the 1990s. He was the author of the opening goal in the final against Maldives, which saw the reigning champions Pakistan successfully defend their title at the 1991 South Asian Games.

== Early life ==
Ashfaq was born on 12 December 1967 in Hassan Abdal, in the Attock district of Pakistan, with his family originally belonging from Lakki Marwat in the neighbouring North Western Frontier Province. He graduated from Cadet College Hasan Abdal, playing sports such as football, cricket, and track.

== Club career ==
Ashfaq played football in his college days, after graduating he started playing for Karwan Club. He was scouted by Hafiz Salman Butt, general secretary of the Pakistan Football Federation, and founder of Wohaib FC, and included him in his team. He was also selected to play for Punjab, where he won the 1990 National Football Championship, finding the net in the final of the competition. As well as participating in the 1989–90 Asian Club Championship. In 1990, Ashfaq also featured in the National Youth Championship.

Later on, he joined WAPDA where he won his second championship title, scoring a header in the 1991 final against Habib Bank. He also played in the 1991 Asian Club Championship. In 1992, Ashfaq scored in the 96th minute of the National Games final, helping WAPDA win the title.

Ashfaq played a key role in helping Allied Bank where he was vice-captain from 1996 to 2000, winning the National Challenge Cup in 1996, 1998 and 1999. He also won the National Football Championship twice with Allied Bank, first in 1997, and then in 1999.

== International career ==
Ashfaq joined the Pakistan national under-23 team for the 1992 and 1996 Olympic Qualifiers. He made his international debut on 22 October 1989 against Nepal in the 1989 South Asian Games. The match played at the Jinnah Stadium in Islamabad was tied 0–0. Ashfaq scored his first international goal in a 2–0 victory against Maldives in his second game, as Pakistan passed the group stages and won the title by defeating Bangladesh in the final.

In the subsequent 1991 South Asian Games in Colombo under the captainship of Ghulam Sarwar Teddy, Ashfaq scored against Bangladesh, qualifying Pakistan for the final against Maldives. In the dying minutes of the game, Ashfaq scored the first goal in the 83rd minute before Muhammad Nauman Khan, finishing the match by a 2–0 victory for Pakistan, and winning their second title in the competition.

Ashfaq also represented the national team in the inaugural 1993 SAARC Gold Cup in Lahore, where he scored a goal against Nepal, 1995 in Colombo, and 1997 in Kathmandhu. He was also present in the 1998 FIFA World Cup qualifiers.

He was the captain of the national team from 1996 until 1999 before Haroon Yousaf. Under his captaincy, Pakistan achieved the bronze medal at the 1997 SAFF Gold Cup.

== Death ==
Ashfaq died on 13 November 2001 at the Shaukat Khanum Hospital in Lahore, after fighting cancer for two years. At the time of his death, he was reportedly wearing the shirt of his club Allied Bank, for which he had played in the later years of his career.

== Career statistics ==
=== International goals ===
Scores and results list Pakistan's goal tally first, score column indicates score after each Ashfaq goal.

List of international goals scored by Qazi Ashfaq
No.	Date	Venue	Opponent	Score	Result	Competition
1	24 October 1989	Jinnah Sports Stadium, Islamabad, Pakistan	Maldives	1–0	2–0	1989 South Asian Games
2	24 December 1991	Sugathadasa Stadium, Colombo, Sri Lanka	Bangladesh	1–0	1–0	1991 South Asian Games
3	29 December 1991	Sugathadasa Stadium, Colombo, Sri Lanka	Maldives	1–0	2–0	1991 South Asian Games
4	16 July 1993	Railway Stadium, Lahore, Pakistan	Nepal	1–0	1–1	1993 SAARC Gold Cup

== Honours ==
=== Punjab ===
- National Football Championship:
  - Winners (1): 1990

=== WAPDA ===
- National Football Championship:
  - Winners (1): 1991
- National Games:
  - Winners (1): 1992

=== Allied Bank ===
- National Football Championship:
  - Winners (2): 1997, 1999
- Pakistan National Football Challenge Cup:
  - Winners (3): 1996, 1998, 1999

=== Pakistan ===
- South Asian Games
  - Winners (2): 1989, 1991

=== Individual ===
- President PFF Cup top goal-scorer: 1996 (8 goals)

== See also ==
- List of Pakistan national football team captains
