= Imtiaz Butt =

Pakistani footballer

Personal information
- Full name: Muhammad Imtiaz Kashmiri
- Date of birth: 20 March 1968 (age 58)
- Place of birth: Faisalabad, Pakistan
- Position: Midfielder

Youth career
- 1984–1986: Tariqabad FC

Senior career*
Years	Team	Apps	(Gls)
1986–1987	Crescent Textile Mills		
1987–1994	WAPDA		
1994–1999	Pakistan Airlines		

International career
1991	Pakistan U23		
1992	Pakistan Youth		
1991–2000	Pakistan		
- * Club domestic league appearances and goals

Muhammad Imtiaz Kashmiri (born 20 March 1968), commonly known as Imtiaz Butt, is a Pakistani former footballer who played as a midfielder. He played for Crescent Textile Mills, WAPDA and Pakistan Airlines at the National Football Championship. Butt is among the major players of the Pakistan national football team in the 1990s, and also helped the national team retain gold at the 1991 South Asian Games.

== Early life ==
The youngest among six siblings, Butt was born in Faisalabad, in the Punjab province of Pakistan. He passed his matriculation with distinction from Government Muslim High School Tariqabad. He started playing football in 1984 with Tariqabad Football Club in Faisalabad, initially playing as both forward and goalkeeper until switching to midfield.

== Club career ==
=== Crescent Textile Mills ===
On 28 July 1986, Butt joined the Crescent Textile Mills departmental team, for which he remained until 17 February 1987.

=== WAPDA ===
On 18 February 1987, Butt joined WAPDA at the National Football Championship. In 1990, Butt also participated in the National Youth Championship held in Faisalabad and represented Punjab, where his team secured the second position. In the 1991 National Football Championship season, he helped the team clinch the title after providing an assist to Qazi Ashfaq in the final against Habib Bank which ended in a 1–0 victory.

In 1992, Butt scored a penalty at the 107th minute in the final of the 1992 National Games, helping WAPDA win the national title. He left WAPDA on 7 November 1994.

==== Foreign interest ====
Due to his performance with the Pakistan youth team at the 1992 AFC Youth Championship qualifiers held in Kannur, India, Butt was offered playing contracts by Wari Club Dhaka and Dhaka Wanderers from Bangladesh in 1992, and later the Maine Maritime Mariners football team from the United States in 1993, which later failed to materialise. However, the move failed to materialise due to Pakistan Football Federation failure to provide Butt with the International Transfer Certificate.

=== Pakistan Airlines ===
On 16 November 1994, Butt joined Pakistan Airlines and helped the team win the National Football Championship title in 1997.

== International career ==
Butt got selected by the national under-23 side for the 1992 Summer Olympics qualifiers in 1991. He also captained the Pakistan under-19 national team at the 1992 AFC Youth Championship qualifiers in Kannur, India.

Butt was first called by the senior Pakistan national team at the 1991 South Asian Games in Sri Lanka. He made his first bench appearance for the senior national team in the opening game against Maldives. He featured as starter in the final against Maldives, winning the match by 2–0 and clinching the title.

== Coaching career ==
After his retirement as player, Butt served as manager of the Pakistan national under-19 team for the 2008 AFC U-19 Championship qualification in November 2007 in Tehran.

He also was member of the coaching staff of several clubs from Faisalabad including PMC Club Athletico, Lyallpur, SA Farms and Masha United. Later on, he opened a football academy in Faisalabad that engages veteran players while also training young footballers.

== Honours ==
=== Pakistan ===
- South Asian Games
  - Winners (1): 1991

=== WAPDA ===
- National Football Championship
  - Winners (1): 1991
- National Games:
  - Winners (1): 1992

=== Pakistan Airlines ===
- National Football Championship:
  - Winners (1): 1997
