= 1999 National Football Championship (Pakistan) =

Tournament details
- Country: Pakistan
- Venue(s): Railway Stadium, Lahore
- Dates: 7 May 1999 – 1 June 1999
- Teams: 24

Final positions
- Champions: Allied Bank
- Runners-up: Pakistan Navy

The 1999 National Football Championship was the 46th edition of the National Football Championship, played at the Railway Stadium, Lahore from 7 May to 1 June 1999.

== Group stage ==
=== Group A ===
| Pos | Team | Pld | W | D | L | GF | GA | GD | Pts | Qualification |
|---|---|---|---|---|---|---|---|---|---|---|
| 1 | Pakistan International Airlines | 2 | 2 | 0 | 0 | 6 | 0 | +6 | 6 | Qualified for knockout stage |
| 2 | Pakistan Telecommunication | 2 | 1 | 0 | 1 | 6 | 1 | +5 | 3 | Qualified for knockout stage |
| 3 | Sindh Greens | 2 | 0 | 0 | 2 | 0 | 11 | −11 | 0 | |

Source: RSSSF

| PIA | 1–0 | PTCL |
|---|---|---|
| | Report |

| PTCL | 6–0 | Sindh Greens |
|---|---|---|
| | Report |

| PIA | 5–0 | Sindh Greens |
|---|---|---|
| | Report |

=== Group B ===
| Pos | Team | Pld | W | D | L | GF | GA | GD | Pts | Qualification |
|---|---|---|---|---|---|---|---|---|---|---|
| 1 | Army | 2 | 2 | 0 | 0 | 13 | 1 | +12 | 6 | Qualified for knockout stage |
| 2 | KMC | 2 | 1 | 0 | 1 | 6 | 7 | −1 | 3 | Qualified for knockout stage |
| 3 | NWFP Greens | 2 | 0 | 0 | 2 | 1 | 12 | −11 | 0 | |

Source: RSSSF

| Army | 7–0 | NWFP Greens |
|---|---|---|
| | Report |

| Army | 6–1 | KMC |
|---|---|---|
| | Report |

| KMC | 5–1 | NWFP Greens |
|---|---|---|
| | Report |

=== Group C ===
| Pos | Team | Pld | W | D | L | GF | GA | GD | Pts | Qualification |
|---|---|---|---|---|---|---|---|---|---|---|
| 1 | National Bank of Pakistan | 2 | 1 | 1 | 0 | 3 | 1 | +2 | 4 | Qualified for knockout stage |
| 2 | Navy | 2 | 1 | 1 | 0 | 1 | 0 | +1 | 4 | Qualified for knockout stage |
| 3 | Punjab Reds | 2 | 0 | 0 | 2 | 1 | 4 | −3 | 0 | |

Source: RSSSF

| National Bank of Pakistan | 3–1 | Punjab Reds |
|---|---|---|
| | Report |

| Navy | 1–0 | Punjab Reds |
|---|---|---|
| | Report |

| National Bank of Pakistan | 0–0 | Navy |
|---|---|---|
| | Report |

=== Group D ===
| Pos | Team | Pld | W | D | L | GF | GA | GD | Pts | Qualification |
|---|---|---|---|---|---|---|---|---|---|---|
| 1 | Khan Research Laboratories | 2 | 2 | 0 | 0 | 10 | 4 | +6 | 6 | Qualified for knockout stage |
| 2 | Railways | 2 | 1 | 0 | 1 | 9 | 4 | +5 | 3 | Qualified for knockout stage |
| 3 | Balochistan Reds | 2 | 0 | 0 | 2 | 3 | 14 | −11 | 0 | |

Source: RSSSF

| Khan Research Laboratories | 4–1 | Railways |
|---|---|---|
| | Report |

| Railways | 8–0 | Balochistan Reds |
|---|---|---|
| | Report |

| Khan Research Laboratories | 6–3 | Balochistan Reds |
|---|---|---|
| | Report |

=== Group E ===
| Pos | Team | Pld | W | D | L | GF | GA | GD | Pts | Qualification |
|---|---|---|---|---|---|---|---|---|---|---|
| 1 | Karachi Port Trust | 2 | 2 | 0 | 0 | 6 | 1 | +5 | 6 | Qualified for knockout stage |
| 2 | Pakistan Air Force | 2 | 1 | 0 | 1 | 4 | 1 | +3 | 3 | Qualified for knockout stage |
| 3 | Punjab Greens | 2 | 0 | 0 | 2 | 1 | 9 | −8 | 0 | |

Source: RSSSF

| KPT | 5–1 | Punjab Greens |
|---|---|---|
| | Report |

| KPT | 1–0 | PAF |
|---|---|---|
| | Report |

| PAF | 4–0 | Punjab Greens |
|---|---|---|
| | Report |

=== Group F ===
| Pos | Team | Pld | W | D | L | GF | GA | GD | Pts | Qualification |
|---|---|---|---|---|---|---|---|---|---|---|
| 1 | WAPDA | 2 | 1 | 1 | 0 | 1 | 0 | +1 | 4 | Qualified for knockout stage |
| 2 | NWFP Reds | 2 | 1 | 1 | 0 | 2 | 1 | +1 | 4 | Qualified for knockout stage |
| 3 | Pakistan Automobile Corporation | 2 | 0 | 0 | 2 | 1 | 3 | −2 | 0 | |

Source: RSSSF

| WAPDA | 1–0 | Pakistan Automobile Corporation |
|---|---|---|
| | Report |

| WAPDA | 0–0 | NWFP Reds |
|---|---|---|
| | Report |

| NWFP Reds | 2–1 | Pakistan Automobile Corporation |
|---|---|---|
| | Report |

=== Group G ===
| Pos | Team | Pld | W | D | L | GF | GA | GD | Pts | Qualification |
|---|---|---|---|---|---|---|---|---|---|---|
| 1 | Habib Bank | 2 | 1 | 0 | 1 | 3 | 2 | +1 | 3 | Qualified for knockout stage |
| 2 | Police | 2 | 1 | 0 | 1 | 2 | 3 | −1 | 3 | Qualified for knockout stage |
| 3 | Balochistan Greens | 2 | 1 | 0 | 1 | 3 | 3 | 0 | 3 | |

Source: RSSSF

| HBL | 2–0 | Police |
|---|---|---|
| | Report |

| Police | 2–1 | Balochistan Greens |
|---|---|---|
| | Report |

| Balochistan Greens | 2–1 | HBL |
|---|---|---|
| | Report |

=== Group H ===
| Pos | Team | Pld | W | D | L | GF | GA | GD | Pts | Qualification |
|---|---|---|---|---|---|---|---|---|---|---|
| 1 | Allied Bank | 2 | 2 | 0 | 0 | 6 | 2 | +4 | 6 | Qualified for knockout stage |
| 2 | Sindh Reds | 2 | 1 | 0 | 1 | 4 | 4 | 0 | 3 | Qualified for knockout stage |
| 3 | University Grants Commission | 2 | 0 | 0 | 2 | 2 | 6 | −4 | 0 | |

Source: RSSSF

| ABL | 3–1 | University Grants Commission |
|---|---|---|
| | Report |

| ABL | 3–1 | Sindh Reds |
|---|---|---|
| | Report |

| Sindh Reds | 3–1 | University Grants Commission |
|---|---|---|
| | Report |

== Knockout stage ==
=== Round of 16 ===
| Sindh Reds | 5–1 | NWFP Reds |
|---|---|---|
| | Report |

| KPT | 0–0 | Balochistan Greens |
|---|---|---|
| | Report |
Penalties
| | 4–1 |

| ABL | 3–2 | WAPDA |
|---|---|---|
| | Report |

| KRL | 4–0 | KMC |
|---|---|---|
| | Report |

| Railways | 4–3 | Army |
|---|---|---|
| | Report |

| Navy | 3–1 | PIA |
|---|---|---|
| | Report |

| PAF | 1–0 | HBL |
|---|---|---|
| | Report |

| National Bank of Pakistan | 1–0 | PTCL |
|---|---|---|
| | Report |

=== Quarter-finals ===
| ABL | 3–2 | Sindh Reds |
|---|---|---|
| | Report |

| PAF | 2–1 | KPT |
|---|---|---|
| | Report |

| Khan Research Laboratories | 2–2 | Railways |
|---|---|---|
| | Report |
Penalties
| | 3–2 |

| Navy | 3–2 | National Bank |
|---|---|---|
| | Report |

=== Semi-finals ===
| ABL | 2–2 | PAF |
|---|---|---|
| | Report |
Penalties
| | 9–8 |

| Navy | 1–0 | KRL |
|---|---|---|
| | Report |

=== Final ===
| ABL | 0–0 | Navy |
|---|---|---|
| | Report |
Penalties
| | 4–3 |
