= 2003 President PFF Cup =

National Football Challenge Cup

Tournament details
- Country: Pakistan
- Venue: Quetta
- Dates: 18 September 20023 – 5 October 2003
- Teams: 17 (total); 15 (participating, 2 teams withdrew)

Final positions
- Champions: PTCL (1st title)
- Runners-up: Karachi Port Trust

Tournament statistics
- Matches played: 28
- Goals scored: 72 (2.57 per match)
- Top goal scorer(s): Lal Bakhsh; Muhammad Essa; Muhammad Nawaz (5 goals)

The 2003 President PFF Cup was the 16th edition of Pakistan National Football Challenge Cup. It ran from 18 September till 5 October 2003, and was held in Quetta.

The tournament was initially scheduled to feature 17 teams, a reduction from the traditional 24. Two days before the event began, the Higher Education Commission (HEC) was added by newly elected Pakistan Football Federation secretary Arshad Khan Lodhi. This late inclusion led to a significant reshuffling of the original 16-team draw and group allocations. However, only 15 teams ultimately participated, as both HEC and the City District Government Karachi (CDGK) withdrew before playing any matches.

PTCL won the title on coin toss after a draw against Karachi Port Trust, no penalty shoot-out was held because the chief guest, the governor of Balochistan, could not wait.

== Group stage ==
=== Pool A ===
Pos	Team	Pld	W	D	L	GF	GA	GD	Pts	Qualification
1	Karachi Port Trust	3	2	1	0	10	3	+7	7	Advance to Knockout round
2	Allied Bank	3	2	0	1	3	6	−3	6	Advance to Knockout round
3	Pakistan Police	3	1	1	1	9	4	+5	4	
4	Pakistan Airlines	3	0	0	3	1	10	−9	0	

Source: RSSSF

=== Pool B ===
Pos	Team	Pld	W	D	L	GF	GA	GD	Pts	Qualification
1	PTCL	3	2	1	0	6	1	+5	7	Advance to Knockout round
2	Habib Bank	3	1	2	0	5	2	+3	5	Advance to Knockout round
3	Pakistan Railways	3	1	1	1	1	1	0	4	
4	Pakistan Air Force	3	0	0	3	1	9	−8	0	

Source: RSSSF

=== Pool C ===
Pos	Team	Pld	W	D	L	GF	GA	GD	Pts	Qualification
1	Pakistan Navy	2	1	1	0	1	0	+1	4	Advance to Knockout round
2	Pakistan Army	2	0	2	0	1	1	0	2	Advance to Knockout round
3	KESC	2	0	1	1	1	2	−1	1	
4	~~City District Government Karachi~~ *	0	0	0	0	0	0	0	0	

Source: RSSSF

=== Pool D ===
Pos	Team	Pld	W	D	L	GF	GA	GD	Pts	Qualification
1	Khan Research Laboratories	3	3	0	0	10	3	+7	9	Advance to Knockout round
2	WAPDA	3	2	0	1	5	2	+3	6	Advance to Knockout round
3	National Bank	3	1	0	2	5	7	−2	3	
4	Sui Southern Gas	3	0	0	3	2	10	−8	0	
5	~~Higher Education Commission~~ *	0	0	0	0	0	0	0	0	

Source: RSSSF

== Knockout round ==
=== Quarter finals ===
1 October 2003

Karachi Port Trust	2–1 (a.e.t.)	Habib Bank
Asif Ayub 32'; Lal Bakhsh 111'	Report	Abdul Qayyum 71'

1 October 2003

PTCL	1–0	Allied Bank
Essa 91'	Report

2 October 2003

Pakistan Navy	0–0	WAPDA
	Report
Penalties
	4–3

2 October 2003

Khan Research Laboratories	1–0	Pakistan Army
Allah Nawaz 70'	Report

=== Semi finals ===
3 October 2003

Pakistan Navy	0–3	Karachi Port Trust
	Report	Lal Bakhsh 43'; Akhtar 45' (pen.); Majeed

4 October 2003

Khan Research Laboratories	0–1	PTCL
	Report	S. Ahmed 94'

=== Finals ===
5 October 2003

Karachi Port Trust	1–1	PTCL
Akhtar 78' (pen.)	Report	Hameed 58'

Sadiq Shaheed Stadium, Quetta
Referee: Nazeer Ahmed

== Statistics ==
=== Top goalscorers ===
Rank	Player	Team	Goals
1	Lal Bakhsh	Karachi Port Trust	5
1	Muhammad Essa	PTCL	5
1	Muhammad Nawaz	Pakistan Police	5
2	Fareed Majeed	Karachi Port Trust	4
