= Muhammad Tariq Hussain =

Pakistani footballer (born 1970)

Personal information
- Full name: Muhammad Tariq Hussain
- Date of birth: 15 September 1970 (age 56)
- Place of birth: Lyari, Pakistan
- Position: Defender

Youth career
- Lyari Star

Senior career*
Years	Team	Apps	(Gls)
1987	Lyari Star		
1988–2006	Habib Bank		

International career
1987–2003	Pakistan	40	(0)

Managerial career
- 2012–2016: Habib Bank (assistant)
- 2018–2019: Civil Aviation Authority (assistant)
- * Club domestic league appearances and goals

Muhammad Tariq Hussain (born 15 September 1970) is a Pakistani former footballer who played as a defender. He played for Habib Bank throughout his career, serving as assistant coach of the team later on. Tariq is among the major players of the Pakistan national football team in the 1990s, and also captained the national team.

== Early life ==
Hussain was born on 15 September 1970 in Lyari.

== Club career ==
He started playing football since the age of 10, starting his youth career with Lyari Star. In 1985, Tariq featured in the National Youth Football Championship.

Tariq played for Habib Bank throughout his career at the National Football Championship and later the Pakistan Premier League.

== International career ==
Tariq started playing for Pakistan White at the 1987 Quaid-e-Azam International Tournament held in Lahore. Due to his performance, he was selected for the Pakistan national team for the 1987 South Asian Games where he made his debut. In 1989, he featured at the 1990 FIFA World Cup qualification in the country's first participation in the tournament. He also featured in Pakistan's second participation at the 1994 FIFA World Cup qualification in 1993, playing in all eight matches where Pakistan again ended up unsuccessful.

He also featured as a starter in several tournaments including the 1988 AFC Asian Cup qualification, 1991 South Asian Games where he helped the side win the gold medal, 1992 AFC Asian Cup qualification, 1995 SAFF Gold Cup, 1998 FIFA World Cup qualification, 1999 SAFF Gold Cup among others. He last played at the 2006 FIFA World Cup qualification in November 2003 in both legs against Kyrgyzstan. He also captained the national team on several occasions.

== Coaching career ==
After his retirement as player, Tariq served as assistant coach of the Habib Bank football team. He was later appointed as assistant coach of the newly formed Civil Aviation Authority team.

== Honours ==
=== Pakistan ===
- South Asian Games
  - Winners (1): 1991

== See also ==
- List of Pakistan national football team captains
