= Fareed Majeed (footballer) =

Pakistani footballer (born 1974)

Personal information
- Full name: Fareed Majeed
- Date of birth: 9 July 1974 (age 52)
- Place of birth: Pakistan
- Position: Striker

Senior career*
Years	Team	Apps	(Gls)
19??–2011	Karachi Port Trust		

International career
1996–2003	Pakistan	7	(0)

Managerial career
- Karachi Port Trust
- * Club domestic league appearances and goals

Fareed Majeed (Urdu: فرید مجید; born 1974) is a Pakistani former footballer, who played as a striker, and manager. Majeed played for the Pakistan national football team between 1997 and 2003, and served as the coach of the Karachi Port Trust.

== Club career ==
Majeed played for Karachi Port Trust throughout his entire career.

== International career ==
Majeed first received a call-up to the Pakistan at the 1996 AFC Asian Cup qualification. The next year, he played at the 1998 FIFA World Cup qualifiers. He played in two matches against Iraq, both of which Pakistan lost, with scores of 6–1 and 6–2. That same year, he also participated in the third-place play-off of the 1997 SAFF Cup against the Sri Lanka national team, helping Pakistan secure victory. In 2002, he was included in the Pakistan squad for their tour to Sri Lanka to play against their national team.

His final international appearance came at the 2003 SAFF Gold Cup, where he played against the Afghanistan national team.

== Post-retirement ==
Majeed would go on to serve as the head coach of his former club Karachi Port Trust.

== Personal life ==
Fareed's four brothers, Zafar Majeed, Hanif Majeed, Waheed Majeed and Atta Majeed are also footballers. Zafar has also represented the Pakistan national team.

== Honours ==
=== Player ===
- President PFF Cup:
  - Runner-up (2): 1998, 2003
- KPT-PFF Cup
  - Winners (1): 2010
