= Roshan Perera =

Sri Lankan businessman (born 1976)

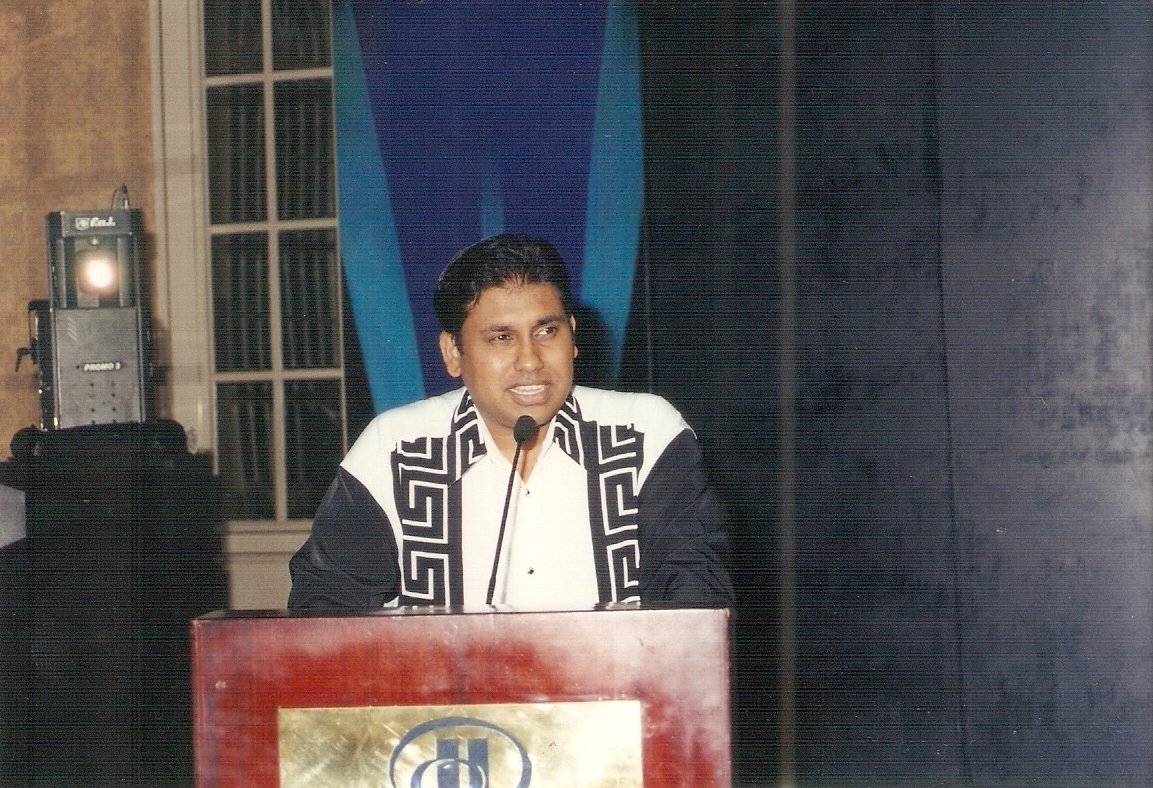
- Roshan Perera, February 2012
- Born: Roshan Perera; 2 April 1976 (age 50); Colombo, Sri Lanka
- Education: St Josephs College; University of Connecticut; Harvard Business School
- Occupations: Businessman: Chairman of Platinum Holdings (pvt) Ltd; Chairman of Lanka SSS pvt ltd
- Years active: 1994–present

Roshan Perera (born 2 April 1976) is a Sri Lankan entrepreneur, business magnate, investor, and philanthropist. He was also the CEO of Bellucci Sri Lanka (pvt) Ltd in 1996, which he made into Asia's largest ceramic figurine manufacturing company. He eventually owned the company while employing over 5,000 staff members. The company was the flagship supplier to multinational companies such as Disney, Hallmark and Walmart.

At 22, he was considered the youngest Sri Lankan billionaire entrepreneur to run organizations with over 10 billion Sri Lankan rupees turnover. By 2001, his business empire was diversified into branches for ceramics, agriculture, packaging, freight-forwarding, clothing and fashion, and media and investments.

== Career ==
After dropping out of Harvard Business School and returning home, he developed the contact he had made with Disney, in particular with the then Disney CEO Michael Eisner. He convinced Disney to visit Sri Lanka in 1996 braving the civil war that ravaged the country This was the breakthrough the country needed: Disney was the world's only Fortune 500 company to purchase goods from the war-torn island, which laid the foundation for other companies such as Hallmark to follow suit and boost the economy of Sri Lanka.

Unhappy with simply manufacturing figurines for international brands, Perera launched his own brand named Bellucci.

== Beauty Pageants ==
Roshan Perera is the Franchisee for Miss Sri Lanka Online, Miss Sri Lanka for Miss Intercontinental, which is the country's most popular beauty pageant to-date.,

In 2005, he ventured into the beauty pageant Industry, some of the winners who came from his organizations include Maria Colombage and Jacqueline Fernandez.

== Other ventures ==
His main investment is considered to be "Lanka SS", the company he inherited from his father, which manufactures ice skates. The flagship company Platinum Holdings is considered to have investments diversified in countries from Australia to India.

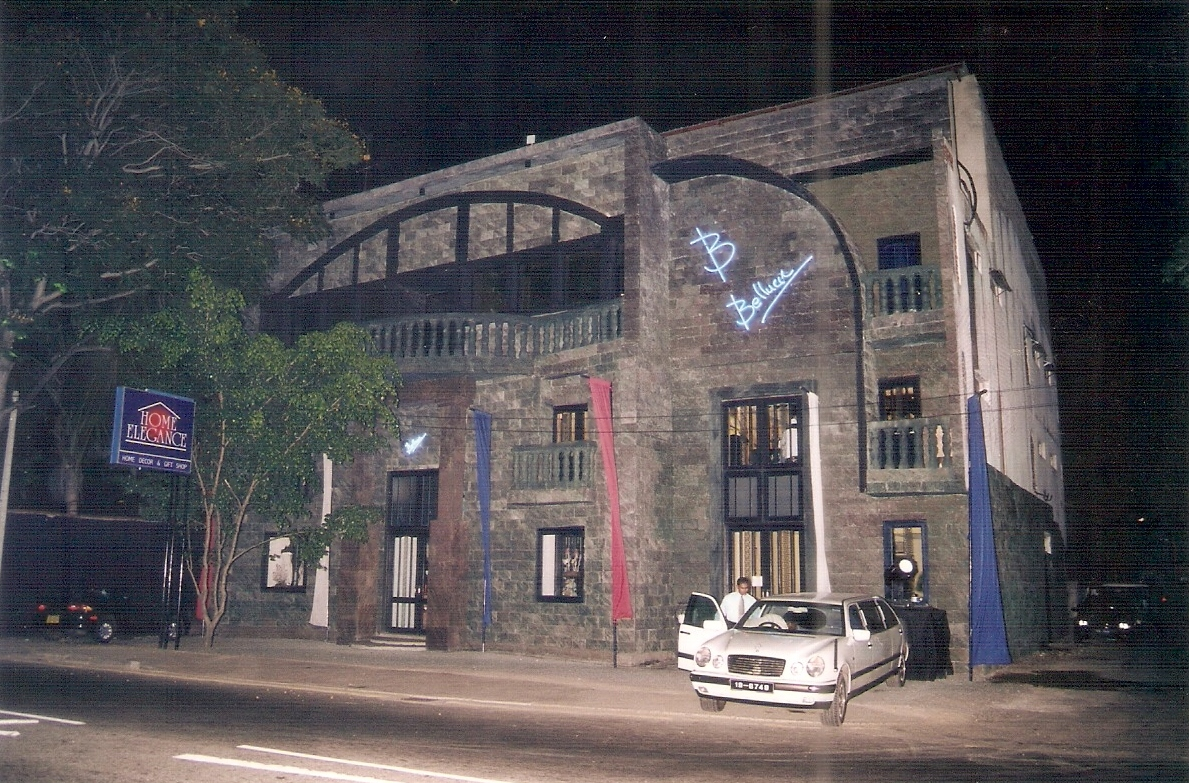
Bellucci head office

In agriculture, the company is currently popularizing traditional rice varieties known as the Miracle Rice of Sri Lanka. Over 10,000 acres of farm land is used for this purpose.

== Interests ==
He was the youngest major donor to Sri Lanka's largest Rotary Club and subsequently became its President.
