= Pervaiz Ahmed =

Pakistani footballer (born 1967)

Personal information
- Date of birth: 1967 (age 58–59)
- Place of birth: Karachi, Pakistan
- Position: Defender

Youth career
- Mauripur Azad

Senior career*
| Years | Team | Apps | (Gls) |
- Habib Bank

International career
| 1995–1999 | Pakistan | | |
- * Club domestic league appearances and goals

Pervaiz Ahmed (Urdu: پرویز احمد; born 1967) is a Pakistani former footballer who played as a defender. He represented the Pakistan national team in the 1990s.

== Early life ==
Ahmed was born in the Mauripur town of Karachi in 1967. He studied up to middle school.

== Club career ==
Ahmed started his football career from Mauripur Azad FC. He later joined departmental side Habib Bank, and also captained the team. At the 1999 President PFF Cup, Ahmed scored 5 goals against Agha Gas Company in a 8–0 victory, finishing as top scorer of the tournament. He featured at the National Football Championship and later at the Pakistan Premier League with the team.

== International career ==
Ahmed represented the Pakistan national team at the 1995 SAARC Gold Cup. He was again called for the 1999 SAFF Gold Cup.

== Playing style ==
Ahmed was praised for his ability as an all-rounder as a defensive player, and for his ability to score goals in more advanced position.
