= Muhammad Ejaz (footballer) =

Pakistani footballer (Unknown birthdate)

Personal information
- Full name: Muhammad Ejaz Gosha
- Date of birth: Unknown
- Place of birth: Sahiwal, Pakistan
- Position: Striker

Senior career*
Years	Team	Apps	(Gls)
2000s	Allied Bank		

International career
1997–1999	Pakistan		(1)
- * Club domestic league appearances and goals

Muhammad Ejaz (Urdu: محمد اعجاز) is a former Pakistani footballer who played as a striker, and also represented the Pakistan national team.

== Club career ==
Ejaz played for Allied Bank Limited in the 2000s, he found the net in the final of the 2002 President PFF Cup, helping the club win the President Cup several times.

== International career ==
Ejaz was called up to represent Pakistan for the 1997 SAFF Gold Cup, where he scored against Nepal in the 68th minute. Ejaz also played at the 1999 SAF Games.
