= 1991 National Football Championship (Pakistan) =

Tournament details
- Country: Pakistan
- Venue: Lahore
- Dates: 16 May 1991 – 31 May 1991

Final positions
- Champions: WAPDA
- Runners-up: Habib Bank
- Third place: Punjab Reds

The 1991 National Football Championship was the 37th edition of the National Football Championship, Pakistan's premier domestic football competition. It was played from 16 to 31 May 1991.

== Overview ==
From the preliminary stage, six teams, Punjab Reds, Pakistan Railways, WAPDA, Habib Bank, Sindh Reds and Pakistan Airlines qualified for the main round. The teams were then split into two groups, with the top two from each pool qualifying for the semi-finals. In the semifinals, Habib Bank scored a 2–1 victory over defending champions Punjab Reds, while WAPDA defeated PIA side by 2–0 to enter the final. The concluded national championship served as the criterion for selecting probables to the national camp for the 1991 South Asian Games.

WAPDA won the 37th National Football Championship after a solitary goal win against Habib Bank in the 31 May final at Lahore. WAPDA striker Qazi Ashfaq scored the match-winning goal after a goalless first half. Defending champions Punjab Reds finished third.

== Main round ==
From the preliminary stage, six teams qualified for the main round:

Match results unknown

=== Group A ===
- Punjab Reds
- WAPDA
- Pakistan Railways

=== Group B ===
- Pakistan Airlines
- Sindh Reds
- Habib Bank Limited

== Knockout stage ==
=== Semi-finals ===
28 May 1991

Habib Bank	2–1	Punjab Reds

29 May 1991

WAPDA	2–0	Pakistan Airlines

=== Third-place match ===
Punjab Reds	N/A	Pakistan Airlines

=== Final ===
31 May 1991

WAPDA	1–0	Habib Bank
Ashfaq 48'

Railway Stadium, Lahore, Pakistan
