= 1998 President PFF Cup =

National Football Challenge Cup

Tournament details
- Country: Pakistan
- Venue: Karachi
- Dates: ??–1 December 1998
- Teams: 24

Final positions
- Champions: Allied Bank (2nd title)
- Runners-up: Karachi Port Trust

Tournament statistics
- Matches played: 40
- Goals scored: 128 (3.2 per match)

The 1998 President PFF Cup was the 11th edition of Pakistan National Football Challenge Cup.

Defending champions Allied Bank won the tournament, defeating Karachi Port Trust 1–0 in the final held in KMC Football Stadium, Karachi on 1 December 1998.

== Teams ==
24 departmental teams participated in the tournament. Karachi Development Authority (KDA) and Port Qasim Authority (PQA) entered the competition, replacing Quetta Municipal Committee (QMC) and Chaman Trading Corporation (CTC) in the tournament lineup.

- Allied Bank
- Pakistan Police
- Karachi Development Authority
- Habib Bank Limited
- Pakistan Telecommunications
- Pakistan Navy
- Pakistan Airlines
- Pakistan Air Force
- Port Qasim Authority
- Khan Research Laboratories
- KESC
- Agha Gas Quetta
- Crescent Textile Mills
- Karachi Port Trust
- Sui Southern Gas
- WAPDA
- Karachi Metropolitan Corporation
- Pakistan Automobil Corporation
- National Bank
- Sindh Government Press
- Afghan Agency Chaman
- Pakistan Railways
- Pakistan Army
- Public Works Department

== Group stage ==
=== Group A ===
| Pos | Team | Pld | W | D | L | GF | GA | GD | Pts | Qualification |
|---|---|---|---|---|---|---|---|---|---|---|
| 1 | Allied Bank | 2 | 1 | 1 | 0 | 6 | 1 | +5 | 4 | Advance to Knockout round |
| 2 | Pakistan Police | 2 | 1 | 1 | 0 | 4 | 2 | +2 | 4 | Advance to Knockout round |
| 3 | Karachi Development Authority | 2 | 0 | 0 | 2 | 1 | 8 | −7 | 0 | |

Source: RSSSF
1998

| Allied Bank | 5–0 | Karachi Development Authority |
|---|---|---|
| | Report |

1998

| Allied Bank | 1–1 | Pakistan Police |
|---|---|---|
| | Report |

1998

| Pakistan Police | 3–1 | Karachi Development Authority |
|---|---|---|
| | Report |

=== Group B ===
| Pos | Team | Pld | W | D | L | GF | GA | GD | Pts | Qualification |
|---|---|---|---|---|---|---|---|---|---|---|
| 1 | Habib Bank Limited | 2 | 2 | 0 | 0 | 4 | 0 | +4 | 6 | Advance to Knockout round |
| 2 | Pakistan Telecommunications | 2 | 0 | 1 | 1 | 1 | 3 | −2 | 1 | Advance to Knockout round |
| 3 | Pakistan Navy | 2 | 0 | 1 | 1 | 1 | 3 | −2 | 1 | |

Source: RSSSF
1998

| Habib Bank Limited | 2–0 | Pakistan Navy |
|---|---|---|
| | Report |

1998

| Habib Bank Limited | 2–0 | Pakistan Telecommunications |
|---|---|---|
| | Report |

1998

| Pakistan Navy | 1–1 | Pakistan Telecommunications |
|---|---|---|
| | Report |

==== Playoff ====
1998

| Pakistan Telecommunications | 3–2 | Pakistan Navy |
|---|---|---|
| | Report |

=== Group C ===
| Pos | Team | Pld | W | D | L | GF | GA | GD | Pts | Qualification |
|---|---|---|---|---|---|---|---|---|---|---|
| 1 | Pakistan Airlines | 2 | 2 | 0 | 0 | 6 | 2 | +4 | 6 | Advance to Knockout round |
| 2 | Pakistan Air Force | 2 | 1 | 0 | 1 | 2 | 2 | 0 | 3 | Advance to Knockout round |
| 3 | Port Qasim Authority | 2 | 0 | 0 | 2 | 3 | 7 | −4 | 0 | |

Source: RSSSF
1998

| Pakistan Airlines | 5–2 | Port Qasim Authority |
|---|---|---|
| | Report |

1998

| Pakistan Airlines | 1–0 | Pakistan Air Force |
|---|---|---|
| | Report |

1998

| Pakistan Air Force | 2–1 | Port Qasim Authority |
|---|---|---|
| | Report |

=== Group D ===
| Pos | Team | Pld | W | D | L | GF | GA | GD | Pts | Qualification |
|---|---|---|---|---|---|---|---|---|---|---|
| 1 | Khan Research Laboratories | 2 | 2 | 0 | 0 | 6 | 1 | +5 | 6 | Advance to Knockout round |
| 2 | KESC | 2 | 1 | 0 | 1 | 7 | 6 | +1 | 3 | Advance to Knockout round |
| 3 | Agha Gas Quetta | 2 | 0 | 0 | 2 | 4 | 10 | −6 | 0 | |

Source: RSSSF
1998

| Khan Research Laboratories | 3–1 | Agha Gas Quetta |
|---|---|---|
| | Report |

1998

| Khan Research Laboratories | 3–0 | KESC |
|---|---|---|
| | Report |

1998

| KESC | 7–3 | Agha Gas Quetta |
|---|---|---|
| | Report |

=== Group E ===
| Pos | Team | Pld | W | D | L | GF | GA | GD | Pts | Qualification |
|---|---|---|---|---|---|---|---|---|---|---|
| 1 | Crescent Textile Mills | 2 | 1 | 1 | 0 | 5 | 3 | +2 | 4 | Advance to Knockout round |
| 2 | Karachi Port Trust | 2 | 0 | 2 | 0 | 6 | 6 | 0 | 2 | Advance to Knockout round |
| 3 | Sui Southern Gas | 2 | 0 | 1 | 1 | 3 | 5 | −2 | 1 | |

Source: RSSSF
1998

| Crescent Textile Mills | 2–0 | Sui Southern Gas |
|---|---|---|
| Sajjad Ahmed 15'; Muhammad Aslam 33' | Report |

1998

| Crescent Textile Mills | 3–3 | Karachi Port Trust |
|---|---|---|
| | Report |

1998

| Karachi Port Trust | 3–3 | Sui Southern Gas |
|---|---|---|
| | Report |

=== Group F ===
| Pos | Team | Pld | W | D | L | GF | GA | GD | Pts | Qualification |
|---|---|---|---|---|---|---|---|---|---|---|
| 1 | WAPDA | 2 | 2 | 0 | 0 | 5 | 2 | +3 | 6 | Advance to Knockout round |
| 2 | Karachi Metropolitan Corporation | 2 | 1 | 0 | 1 | 3 | 4 | −1 | 3 | Advance to Knockout round |
| 3 | Pakistan Automobil Corporation | 2 | 0 | 0 | 2 | 0 | 2 | −2 | 0 | |

Source: RSSSF
1998

| WAPDA | 4–2 | Karachi Metropolitan Corporation |
|---|---|---|
| | Report |

1998

| WAPDA | 1–0 | Pakistan Automobil Corporation |
|---|---|---|
| | Report |

1998

| Karachi Metropolitan Corporation | 1–0 | Pakistan Automobil Corporation |
|---|---|---|
| | Report |

=== Group G ===
| Pos | Team | Pld | W | D | L | GF | GA | GD | Pts | Qualification |
|---|---|---|---|---|---|---|---|---|---|---|
| 1 | National Bank | 2 | 2 | 0 | 0 | 4 | 2 | +2 | 6 | Advance to Knockout round |
| 2 | Sindh Government Press | 2 | 1 | 0 | 1 | 5 | 2 | +3 | 3 | Advance to Knockout round |
| 3 | Afghan Agency Chaman | 2 | 0 | 0 | 2 | 1 | 6 | −5 | 0 | |

Source: RSSSF
1998

| National Bank | 2–1 | Sindh Government Press |
|---|---|---|
| | Report |

1998

| National Bank | 2–1 | Afghan Agency Chaman |
|---|---|---|
| | Report |

1998

| Sindh Government Press | 4–0 | Afghan Agency Chaman |
|---|---|---|
| | Report |

=== Group H ===
| Pos | Team | Pld | W | D | L | GF | GA | GD | Pts | Qualification |
|---|---|---|---|---|---|---|---|---|---|---|
| 1 | Pakistan Railways | 2 | 1 | 0 | 1 | 2 | 1 | +1 | 3 | Advance to Knockout round |
| 2 | Pakistan Army | 2 | 1 | 0 | 1 | 2 | 2 | 0 | 3 | Advance to Knockout round |
| 3 | Public Works Department | 2 | 1 | 0 | 1 | 2 | 3 | −1 | 3 | |

Source: RSSSF
1998

| Pakistan Railways | 2–0 | Public Works Department |
|---|---|---|
| | Report |

1998

| Public Works Department | 2–1 | Pakistan Army |
|---|---|---|
| | Report |

1998

| Pakistan Army | 1–0 | Pakistan Railways |
|---|---|---|
| | Report |

== Knockout round ==
=== Round of 16 ===
1998

| Pakistan Army | 5–1 | National Bank |
|---|---|---|
| | Report |

1998

| Allied Bank | 2–1 | Pakistan Telecommunications |
|---|---|---|
| | Report |

1998

| Karachi Metropolitan Corporation | 2–1 | Crescent Textile Mills |
|---|---|---|
| | Report |

1998

| Karachi Port Trust | 2–1 | WAPDA |
|---|---|---|
| | Report |

1998

| Pakistan Railways | 1–0 | Sindh Government Press |
|---|---|---|
| | Report |

1998

| Pakistan Airlines | 3–1 | KESC |
|---|---|---|
| | Report |

1998

| Khan Research Laboratories | 2–2 | Pakistan Air Force |
|---|---|---|
| | Report |
Penalties
| | 4–1 |

1998

| Pakistan Police | 4–2 | Habib Bank Limited |
|---|---|---|
| | Report |

=== Quarter finals ===
1998

| Pakistan Army | 2–1 | Karachi Metropolitan Corporation |
|---|---|---|
| | Report |

1998

| Allied Bank | 2–0 | Pakistan Airlines |
|---|---|---|
| | Report |

1998

| Karachi Port Trust | 0–0 | Pakistan Railways |
|---|---|---|
| | Report |
Penalties
| | 4–2 |

1998

| Pakistan Police | 2–0 | Khan Research Laboratories |
|---|---|---|
| | Report |

=== Semi finals ===
1998

| Karachi Port Trust | 1–0 | Pakistan Police |
|---|---|---|
| | Report |

1998

| Allied Bank | 1–0 | Pakistan Army |
|---|---|---|
| | Report |

=== Finals ===
1 December 1998

| Allied Bank | 1–0 | Karachi Port Trust |
|---|---|---|
| Yousaf 85' | Report |

KMC Football Stadium, Karachi
