= Farooq Aziz =

Pakistani footballer (born 1978)

Personal information
- Date of birth: 25 December 1977 (age 48)
- Place of birth: Pakistan
- Position: Forward

Senior career*
Years	Team	Apps	(Gls)
1992–1994	Wohaib		
1993	→ Defence FC (loan)		
1995–2000	Pakistan Railways		
2001–2004	Khan Research Laboratories		

International career
1992–1993	Pakistan	6	(0)
- * Club domestic league appearances and goals

Farooq Aziz (born 25 December 1977) is a Pakistani former footballer who played as a forward. Aziz represented Wohaib at the 1992–93 Asian Club Championship, and played for the Pakistan national team in 1992–1993.

== Club career ==
Aziz played for Wohaib FC from 1992 till 1994 at the National Football Championship. He was also member of the Wohaib club which participated in the 1992–93 Asian Club Championship, where the team became the first Pakistani club to pass the qualifying round of the Asian Club Championship. Aziz also represented Defence Club at the 1993–94 Asian Club Championship qualifying round against Oman Club.

He later played for Pakistan Railways, and later for the Khan Research Laboratories team.

== International career ==
Aziz made his international debut at the 1992 Jordan International Tournament. On 22 May 1993 he played against China at the 1994 FIFA World Cup qualification, aged only 15 years and 148 days, becoming the youngest player in the world to have played in a World Cup qualifier. He featured as a regular starter in several matches of the qualification stage.
