= Shahid Saleem =

Pakistani footballer

Personal information
- Date of birth: 7 December 1976 (age 49)
- Place of birth: Lyari, Karachi, Pakistan
- Position: Forward

Youth career
- 1988–1996: Ragiwara FC

Senior career*
| Years | Team | Apps | (Gls) |
| 1996–2008 | Habib Bank | | |
| 2008–2013 | Karachi Port Trust | | |

International career
| 1999–2005 | Pakistan | 11 | (0) |
- * Club domestic league appearances and goals

Shahid Saleem (Urdu: شاہد سلیم), is a Pakistani former footballer who played as a forward. Saleem played for Habib Bank and also represented the Pakistan national football team.

== Early life ==
Saleem was born on 7 December 1976 in Lyari, Karachi. He started playing football at the age of 12 with Rangiwara Football Club Lyari and received coaching from former Dhaka Wanderers player Master Amin.

== Club career ==
Saleem first represented Habib Bank at the National Football Championship and since 2004 at the Pakistan Premier League, also captaining the team. He played for Karachi Port Trust since 2008.

== International career ==
Saleem was first selected for the Pakistan national football team in 1996 for the 1998 FIFA World Cup qualification. He subsequently represented the national team in several tournaments till 2005.

== Personal life ==
Saleem has stated Pakistan national team players Muhammad Umer and Abdul Khaliq, along with Cristiano Ronaldo as his idols.
