= National U-19 Football Championship (Pakistan) =

- Organiser(s): Pakistan Football Federation
- Founded: 1964; 62 years ago
- Abolished: 2009; 17 years ago
- Region: Pakistan
- Related competitions: National Football Championship
- Most championships: Balochistan (4 titles)

The National U-19 Football Championship alternatively spelled National U-19 Soccer Championship was the men's highest youth national level football competition in Pakistan from 1964 to 2009. Founded by the Pakistan Football Federation (PFF) in 1964, it was mainly held on knock-out basis, similar to the National Football Championship which ceased in 2003.

The tournament featured several domestic clubs, along with teams representing divisions, provinces, and departmental teams across Pakistan. It was most commonly contested at the U-19 level, although depending on the edition, the age category varied: the 1993 tournament was staged as an U-18 event, while the 2004 tournament was contested as an U-20 event. Despite these changes, they are all considered part of the same championship lineage. The Pakistan Football Federation also organised separate national tournaments for other age groups, including U-13, U-14, U-16, U-17 and U-21, on rare occasions.

== History ==
The National U-19 Football Championship was Pakistan’s highest-level youth tournament from 1964 to 2009, organised by the Pakistan Football Federation. It was usually played on a knock-out basis, similar in format to the senior National Football Championship, which was abolished in 2003. The competition featured domestic clubs as well as teams representing divisions, provinces, and departmental teams across Pakistan.

Although primarily staged as an U-19 championship, the age limit varied in some editions: the 1993 tournament was contested as an U-18 event, while the 2004 edition was organised at the U-20 level. Despite these changes, all editions are recognised as part of the same championship lineage. Alongside the U-19 event, the PFF occasionally introduced other separate national youth tournaments in different age categories. These included the National U-13 Championship (first held in 2005), the U-14 Championship (2004), the U-16 Championship (launched in 2004 and later held annually as the PFF U-16 Cup), the U-17 Championship (with its 4th edition staged in 2005), and the U-21 Championship (inaugurated in 2007).

The championship was an important platform for player development, with many future internationals making their first mark in the competition. However, it was held on an irregular basis: while it ran annually between 1979 and 1987, it was not staged for long periods, most notably during the presidency of Mian Muhammad Azhar, when no editions were organised for eight years between 1995 and 2003. The tournament was revived in 2004, and was again held in 2005, 2007, and 2009.

== Champions ==
- Note: Various provinces (Balochistan, Punjab), or divisions (e.g. Faisalabad) entered teams under various names; all finalists listed can nevertheless be regarded as the 'first' team of the respective clubs.

=== List of champions by season ===
Edition	Year	Champions
1	1964	Dhaka (1)
2	1966	Dhaka (2) shared with Karachi (1)
3	1968	Karachi (2)
4	1972	Sargodha (1)
5	1979	Balochistan White (1)
6	1980	Balochistan Red (2)
7	1981	Multan (1)
8	1982	Pakistan Railways (1)
9	1983	Pakistan Railways (2)
10	1984	Rawalpindi (1)
11	1985	Pakistan Railways (3)
12	1986	Pakistan Steel (1)
13	1987	Karachi South (3)
14	1990	Faisalabad (1)
15	1993	Punjab Reds (1)
16	1994	Pakistan Army (1)
17	2004	Pakistan Army (2)
18	2005	Balochistan (3)
19	2007	Faisalabad Yellow (2)
20	2009	Balochistan (4)

== Total titles won ==
Club	Winners	Winning seasons
Balochistan	4	1979, 1980, 2005, 2009
Karachi	3	1966, 1968, 1987
Pakistan Railways	3	1982, 1983, 1985
Pakistan Army	2	1994, 2004
Dhaka	2	1964, 1966
Faisalabad	2	1990, 2007
Sargodha	1	1972
Multan	1	1981
Pakistan Steel	1	1986
Punjab	1	1993
