= Football at the 1991 South Asian Games =

1991 South Asian Games
Tournament details
- Host country: Sri Lanka
- Dates: 22–29 December
- Teams: 6 (from 1 confederation)
- Venue: 1 (in 1 host city)

Final positions
- Champions: Pakistan (2nd title)
- Runners-up: Maldives
- Third place: Bangladesh

Tournament statistics
- Matches played: 8
- Goals scored: 14 (1.75 per match)
- Top scorer(s): (Pakistan) Qazi Ashfaq (Bangladesh) Rizvi Karim Rumi (2 goals each)

Men's Football at the 1991 South Asian Games was held in Colombo, Sri Lanka from December 22 to 29, 1991.

== Fixtures and results ==
Accurate as of 29 December 1991.

=== Group stage ===
==== Group A ====
Pos	Team	Pld	W	D	L	GF	GA	GD	Pts	Qualification
1	Pakistan	2	1	1	0	1	0	+1	4	Advance to Gold medal match
2	Bangladesh	2	1	0	1	2	2	0	3	Advance to Bronze medal match
3	India	2	0	1	1	1	2	−1	1	

Source: RSSSF
Rules for classification: 1) points; 2) goal difference; 3) goals scored; 4) head-to-head result.
22 December 1991

Pakistan	0–0	India
	Report

Sugathadasa Stadium, Colombo

24 December 1991

Pakistan	1–0	Bangladesh
Ashfaq 81'	Report

Sugathadasa Stadium, Colombo

26 December 1991

Bangladesh	2–1	India
Rumi 20', 75'	Report	Godfrey 88'

Sugathadasa Stadium, Colombo

==== Group B ====
Pos	Team	Pld	W	D	L	GF	GA	GD	Pts	Qualification
1	Maldives	2	2	0	0	2	0	+2	6	Advance to Gold medal match
2	Nepal	2	0	1	1	2	3	−1	1	Advance to Bronze medal match
3	Sri Lanka	3	0	1	2	2	3	−1	1	

Source: RSSSF
Rules for classification: 1) points; 2) goal difference; 3) goals scored; 4) head-to-head result.
22 December 1991

Sri Lanka	2–2	Nepal
Premalal; Jagath Rohana	Report	Rajesh Maskey; Rajesh Manandhar

Sugathadasa Stadium, Colombo

24 December 1991

Maldives	1–0	Nepal
Ismail Asif 30'	Report

Sugathadasa Stadium, Colombo

26 December 1991

Maldives	1–0	Sri Lanka
M Kafeem 75'	Report

Sugathadasa Stadium, Colombo

=== Bronze medal match ===
28 December 1991

Bangladesh	2–0	Nepal
Mamun 44'; Aslam 65'	Report

Sugathadasa Stadium, Colombo

=== Gold medal match ===
29 December 1991

Pakistan	2–0	Maldives
Ashfaq 83'; Nauman 87'	Report

Sugathadasa Stadium, Colombo

== Winner ==
Football at the 1991 South Asian Games

Pakistan
Second title

== Goalscorers ==
There have been 14 goals scored in 8 matches, for an average of 1.75 goals per match.

2 goals

- (Pakistan) Qazi Ashfaq
- (Bangladesh) Rizvi Karim Rumi

1 goal

- (India) Godfrey Pereira
- (Sri Lanka) Prem Lal
- (Sri Lanka) Jagath Rohana
- (Nepal) Rajesh Maskey
- (Nepal) Rajesh Manandhar
- (Maldives) Ismail Asif
- (Maldives) M.Kafeem
- (Bangladesh) Mamun Joarder
- (Bangladesh) Sheikh Mohammad Aslam
- (Pakistan) Muhammad Nauman Khan
