= Allied Bank Limited FC =

Allied Bank Limited
- Full name: Allied Bank Limited Football Club
- Short name: ABL
- Dissolved: 2004; 22 years ago
- Owner: Allied Bank Limited

Allied Bank Limited Football Club (abbreviated as ABL) served as the football section of Allied Bank Limited. Based in Lahore, the club competed in the National Football Championship from the early 1990s until its dissolution in 2004.

== History ==
=== Domestic dominance (1996-2002) ===
By the mid-1990s, ABL became a serious contender in Pakistan’s domestic football. The team included a number of Pakistan internationals such as Haroon Yousaf, Qazi Ashfaq and Gohar Zaman.

In 1995, the club reached the final of the National Football Championship and finished as runners-up. The team won the National Championship thrice in 1997, 1999, 2000, and the President PFF Cup four times (1996, 1998, 1999, 2002).

=== Dissolution (2004) ===
With the restructuring of Pakistani football and the creation of a formal league in 2004, ABL became one of the founder members of the season and participated at the 2004 National A Division Football League. ABL however disbanded their team in June 2004 after refusing to renew the contracts of seven players, they meanwhile restored their team and returned playing. Subsequently the club’s football team was folded at the end of the 2004 season.

== Honours ==
- National Football Championship:
  - Champions (3): 1997, 1999, 2000
  - Runners-up: 1995
- President PFF Cup
  - Winners (4): 1996, 1998, 1999, 2002
