= Karachi Metropolitan Corporation FC =

KMC
- Full name: Karachi Metropolitan Corporation Football Club
- Short name: KMC
- Founded: 1956; 70 years ago (as Karachi Municipal Corporation)
- Dissolved: 2005; 21 years ago
- Ground: KMC Football Stadium, Karachi
- Capacity: 15,000
- Owner: Karachi Metropolitan Corporation

Karachi Metropolitan Corporation Football Club, abbreviated as KMC, served as the football section of the Karachi Metropolitan Corporation. Based at the KMC Football Stadium, the club participated in the National Football Championship. The team was known as Karachi Municipal Corporation from 1956 to 1975, and briefly known as City District Government Karachi (CDGK) from 2001 till 2005.

== History ==
=== Karachi Municipal Corporation (1956–1975) ===
The KMC football team emerged around 1956, when the Karachi Municipal Corporation built the KMC Football Stadium and formed sports teams for civic representation. Early organisers such as Aqil Khan, a KMC official, recruited footballers mainly from Lyari. The club would participate in several local tournaments in the late 1950s.

In 1958, KMC would win the domestic "All-Pakistan Quaid-e-azam tournament" held in Multan. The following year, the club reached the final of the 1959 Aga Khan Gold Cup tournament, losing to Dhaka Mohammedan by 0–2.

==== Growth and local dominance (1960s–1980s) ====
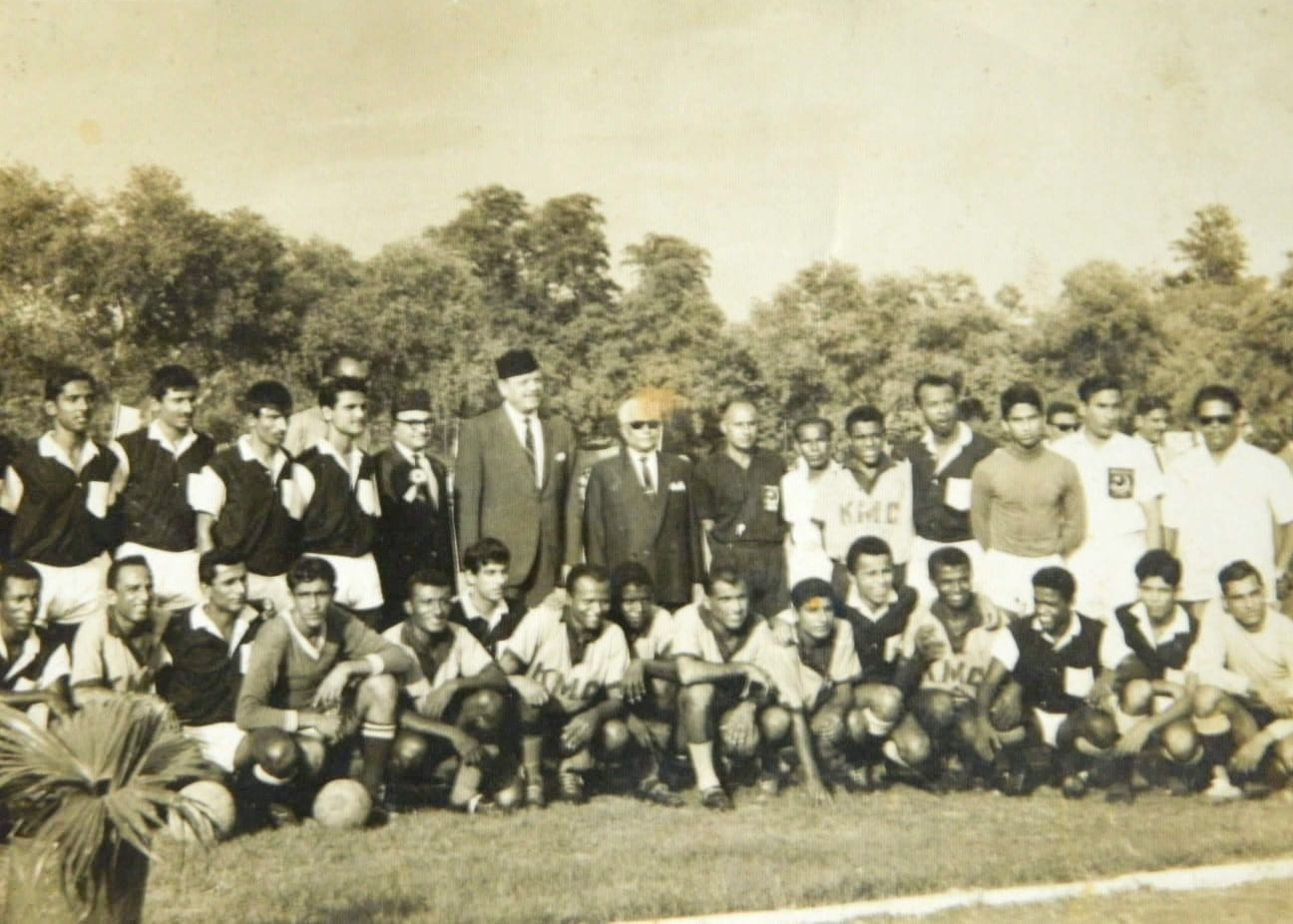
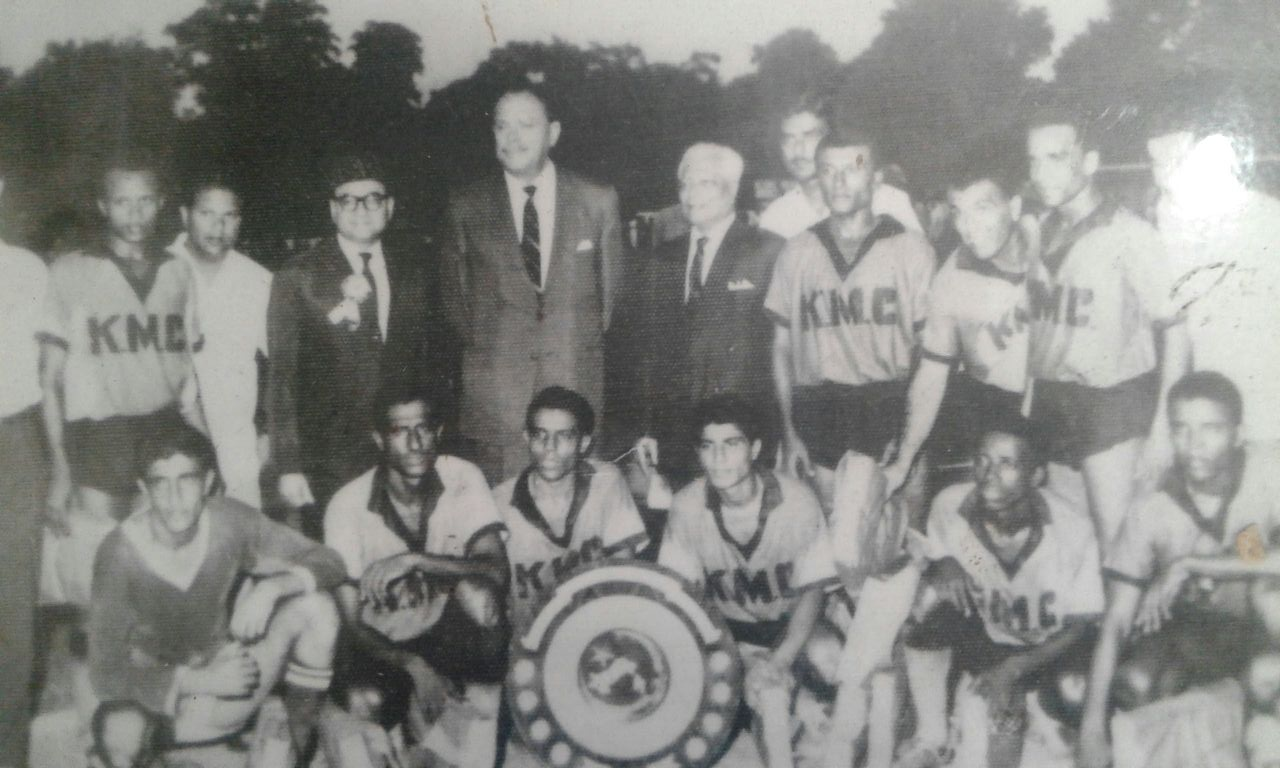
KMC during the final match of the All-Pakistan Mohammad Ali Bogra Tournament in 1967 against Dhaka Mohammedan, a tournament KMC eventually won

In 1964, KMC suffered a notable 6–0 defeat to Karachi Port Trust, prompting management to invest in stronger player recruitment. By the late 1960s, the club had developed a competitive squad and participated in major domestic tournaments, including the All-Pakistan Mohammad Ali Bogra Tournament (1967) in Rawalpindi, where KMC drew 1–1 with Dhaka Mohammedan SC and finished top of the table on points to win the event. At the 1968 Aga Khan Gold Cup, the team advanced the preliminary round, but finished last in the robin round group stage behind Mohammedan and Ceylon. Among the best known players of the team were was Ali Nawaz Baloch, Muhammad Umer, Ghulam Abbas Baloch and Yousuf Sr.

During the 1970s and 1980s, KMC was among Karachi’s key departmental sides, alongside PIA, KPT, and Sindh Government Press, maintaining football activity in the country. Under administrators Fareed Awan and Ahmed Jan, player salaries were raised to attract talent from Lyari, while the KMC Stadium became a hub for All-Pakistan and city tournaments.

=== Karachi Metropolitan Corporation (1976–2001) ===
In 1976 the club, being part of the civic body then known as the Karachi Municipal Corporation, adopted the new name following the upgrade of the corporation to Karachi Metropolitan Corporation.

In Mayor Abdul Sattar Afghani’s tenure in the 1980s, the club twice represented Pakistan in invitational tournaments in China and Japan. In August 1987, the team participated in the Shanghai Wen-Sue Cup Sister Cities International Tournament. Apart from KMC, Shanghai, Shanghai Youth, and teams from Osaka, Yokohama and Hamhung participated. KMC was drawn in the group with Osaka and the ultimate winners Shanghai. In the group match KMC lost to Osaka 4–0 and to Shanghai 3–1. Ghulam Sarwar who played as striker scored for KMC. After losing both the matches, the KMC team played against the Shanghai Youth for a match for fifth and the sixth position, drawing 1–1, with Ghulam Sarwar again scoring the goal.

In the 1990s, the team participated in several editions of the National Football Championship.

=== CDGK era and dissolution (2002–2004) ===
In late 2001, following administrative restructuring, KMC became the City District Government Karachi (CDGK), and the football team began competing under the CDGK name.

During the 2003 President PFF Cup, CDGK withdrew before playing. The next year, the team participated in the inaugural second tier 2004–05 PFF League.

The team was eventually disbanded due to internal conflict.

In December 2017, KMC announced plans to re-establish its football and other sport teams. In April 2021, KMC announced that the corporation had begun the process of forming departmental teams in football, cricket, hockey, volleyball and basketball. In December 2022, the corporation again announced the restoration of its football, cricket and hockey teams, scheduling trials for the football team on 22 December.

In November 2024, a KMC representative team participated in the Metropolitan Football Cup, reaching the semi-finals before losing 8–7 on penalties to Malir Town following a goalless draw.

== Stadium ==
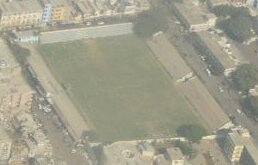
Aerial view of the KMC Football Stadium

KMC Football Stadium has been the club’s traditional home since its construction in 1956. Located in Garden East, Karachi, the stadium has a capacity of approximately 15,000 spectators and has long been one of the city’s main football venues.

== Honours ==
- All-Pakistan Quaid-e-azam tournament:
  - Champions (1): 1958
- Aga Khan Gold Cup:
  - Runners-up (1): 1959
- All-Pakistan Mohammad Ali Bogra Tournament:
  - Champions (1): 1967
- Coronation Cup:
  - Champions (1): 1967
