= 1997 SAFF Gold Cup =

Tournament details
- Host country: Nepal
- Dates: 4–13 September
- Teams: 6
- Venue: 1 (in 1 host city)

Final positions
- Champions: India (2nd title)
- Runners-up: Maldives
- Third place: Pakistan
- Fourth place: Sri Lanka

Tournament statistics
- Matches played: 10
- Goals scored: 29 (2.9 per match)
- Top scorer: (India) IM Vijayan (6 goals)

The 1997 South Asian Football Federation Gold Cup was the third international association football championship for national teams from South Asia organised by the South Asian Football Federation (SAFF). Hosted by Nepal, the competition ran from 4 to 13 September 1997 and was contested by the national teams of Bangladesh, India, the Maldives, Nepal, Pakistan and Sri Lanka.

The tournament began with the first match of the group stage on 4 September 1997 and ended with the final on 13 September 1997. India and the Maldives contested the final. Goals from Ancheri, Baichung Bhutia, IM Vijayan and Amit Das helped India to a 5–1 win as they lifted the trophy for the second time.

== Background ==
The first edition of the biennial South Asian Football Federation Championship, then known as the South Asian Association of Regional Co-operation Gold Cup, was held Lahore, Pakistan in 1993.

Sri Lanka were the defending champions after defeating India 1–0 in sudden death extra time in the final as hosts. India were the only other team to have won the competition after winning the inaugural edition.

=== Participants ===
- Bangladesh
- India
- Maldives
- Nepal
- Pakistan
- Sri Lanka

== Format ==
In total, six teams took part in the competition. They were drawn into two single round robin groups of three teams. The group winners and runners-up would contest the semi-finals which would decide which teams contested the final and the third-place play-off.

== Venues ==
Matches were played at the Dasarath Rangasala Stadium in Kathmandu.

Kathmandu	1997 SAFF Gold Cup is located in Nepal
Dasarath Rangasala Stadium	1997 SAFF Gold Cup is located in Nepal
Capacity: 25,000	1997 SAFF Gold Cup is located in Nepal

== Group stage ==
=== Group A ===
Sri Lanka and Pakistan advanced to the semi-finals.

==== Table ====
Pos	Team	Pld	W	D	L	GF	GA	GD	Pts	Qualification
1	Sri Lanka	2	2	0	0	5	1	+4	6	Qualification for the semi-finals
2	Pakistan	2	1	0	1	2	2	0	3	Qualification for the semi-finals
3	Nepal	2	0	0	2	1	5	−4	0	

==== Matches ====
4 September 1997

Nepal	0–2	Pakistan
		Nauman 28'; Ejaz 68'

Dasarath Rangasala Stadium, Kathmandu

6 September 1997

Sri Lanka	2–0	Pakistan
Perera 54'; Amanulla 86'

Dasarath Rangasala Stadium, Kathmandu

8 September 1997

Nepal	1–3	Sri Lanka
Amayta 72'		Perera 15', 70', 86'

Dasarath Rangasala Stadium, Kathmandu

=== Group B ===
India and the Maldives advanced to the semi-finals.

==== Table ====
Pos	Team	Pld	W	D	L	GF	GA	GD	Pts	Qualification
1	India	2	1	1	0	5	2	+3	4	Qualification for the semi-finals
2	Maldives	2	0	2	0	3	3	0	2	Qualification for the semi-finals
3	Bangladesh	2	0	1	1	1	4	−3	1	

==== Matches ====
5 September 1997

Maldives	1–1	Bangladesh
Saeed		Nakib 53'

Dasarath Rangasala Stadium, Kathmandu

7 September 1997

India	3–0	Bangladesh
Vijayan 74', 76'; Bhutia 88'

Dasarath Rangasala Stadium, Kathmandu

9 September 1997

India	2–2	Maldives
Bhutia 30'; Ancheri 55'		Rasheed 65'; Nizam 83'

Dasarath Rangasala Stadium, Kathmandu

== Semi-finals ==
Sri Lanka defeated the Maldives and India defeated Pakistan to advance to the final.

10 September 1997

Sri Lanka	1–2	Maldives
Kabeer 21'		Ismail 19'; Nizam 89'

Dasarath Rangasala Stadium, Kathmandu

11 September 1997

India	2–0	Pakistan
Vijayan 42', 76'

Dasarath Rangasala Stadium, Kathmandu

== Third-place play-off ==
Pakistan finished third after defeating Sri Lanka 1–0.

13 September 1997

Pakistan	1–0	Sri Lanka
Haseemdeen 76' (o.g.)

Dasarath Rangasala Stadium, Kathmandu

== Final ==
Goals from Jo Paul Ancheri, Baichung Bhutia, I.M. Vijayan and Amit Das helped India to a 5–1 win against the Maldives.

13 September 1997

India	5–1	Maldives
Ancheri 9'; Bhutia 15'; Vijayan 20', 53'; Das 49'		Lateef 43'

Dasarath Rangasala Stadium, Kathmandu
