= Pakistan Telecommunication Company Limited FC =

Pakistan Telecommunication Company Limited
- Full name: Pakistan Telecommunication Company Limited Football Club
- Short name: PTCL
- Dissolved: 2005; 21 years ago
- Owner: Pakistan Telecommunication Company Limited

Pakistan Telecommunication Company Limited Football Club (abbreviated as PTCL) served as the football section of the Pakistan Telecommunication Company Limited. Based in Islamabad, the club competed in Pakistan’s top domestic tournaments during the early 2000s, winning multiple national titles before being disbanded in 2005 following PTCL’s privatisation.

== History ==
=== Early years (1990s–2002) ===
PTCL emerged in the national football scene in the late 1990s as part of Pakistan’s long tradition of departmental football teams. The side began appearing in national-level tournaments including the National Football Championship and the President PFF Cup.

In 2002, PTCL won the All Pakistan Police Challenge Cup held in Mardan, defeating Khan Research Laboratories 2–0 in the final. The club also claimed the All Pakistan Major Tufail Muhammad Shaheed Football Tournament in both 2002 and 2003.

=== Rise to prominence (2003–2005) ===
PTCL’s breakthrough came during the 2003 President PFF Cup in Quetta. The club advanced through the group stages and the semi-finals, where Muhammad Essa scored a golden goal to send PTCL to the final. The final match against Karachi Port Trust was abandoned at 1–1 due to poor light, and PTCL were declared champions after winning a coin toss.

PTCL were also among the departmental teams that made their debut in the inaugural National League season in 2004. In 2005, PTCL won the 2005 National Football Challenge Cup.

=== Dissolution (2005) ===
Following PTCL’s privatisation and organisational restructuring in 2005, the club was disbanded before the start of 2006–07 Pakistan Premier League season.

== Honours ==
- National Football Challenge Cup
  - Champions (2): 2003, 2005
- All Pakistan Police Challenge Cup:
  - Champions (1): 2002
- All Pakistan Major Tufail Muhammad Shaheed Football Tournament
  - Champions (2): 2002, 2003
