= Pakistan Premier League Golden Boot =

The Pakistan Premier League Golden Boot was an annual Pakistani association football award given to the top goalscorer at the end of each season of the Pakistan Premier League, the top domestic league competition in club football in Pakistan from 2004 to 2021.

Arif Mehmood has won the award for the most times, with 5 golden boots, all of them with WAPDA.

== List of Golden Boot winners ==
The following table is a list of winners of the Pakistan Premier League Golden Boot per season, detailing their club, goal tally, actual games played, and their strike rate (goals/games).

Season	Winner	Club	Goals	Games	Rate	Ref.
2004	(Pakistan) Arif Mehmood	WAPDA	20	16	1.25	
2005	(Pakistan) Imran Hussain	Pakistan Army	21	22	0.95	
2006–07	(Pakistan) Arif Mehmood	WAPDA	18	20	0.90	
2007–08	(Pakistan) Arif Mehmood	WAPDA	21	26	0.81	
2008	(Pakistan) Muhammad Rasool	Khan Research Laboratories	22	26	0.85	
2009	(Pakistan) Arif Mehmood	WAPDA	20	26	0.77	
2010	(Pakistan) Arif Mehmood	WAPDA	21	30	0.70	
2011	(Pakistan) Jadeed Khan	Afghan Chaman	22	30	0.73	
2012–13	(Pakistan) Kaleemullah Khan	Khan Research Laboratories	35	30	1.17	
2013–14	(Pakistan) Muhammad bin Yousuf	Karachi Port Trust	27	30	0.90	
2014–15	(Pakistan) Muhammad Rasool	K-Electric	22	22	1.00	
2018–19	(Pakistan) Ansar Abbas	Pakistan Army	15	26	0.58	

== See also ==
- List of Pakistan football champions
