= 2012 National Challenge Cup =

KPT Challenge Cup

Tournament details
- Country: Pakistan
- City: Karachi
- Venue(s): KPT Stadium, People's Football Stadium
- Dates: 11–23 March 2012
- Teams: 16 (originally); 15 (participated)

Final positions
- Champions: Khan Research Laboratories (4th title)
- Runners-up: Karachi Electric Supply Corporation
- Third place: WAPDA
- Fourth place: Pakistan Navy

Tournament statistics
- Matches played: 30
- Goals scored: 72 (2.4 per match)
- Top goal scorer: Muhammad Rasool (10 goals)

Awards
- Best player Best goalkeeper: Kamran Khan (Khan Research Laboratories); Jahangir Shah (Karachi Electric Supply Corporation)
- All statistics correct as of 30 December 2018.

The 2012 National Challenge Cup was the 22nd edition of National Challenge Cup, the domestic cup competition in Pakistani football. The edition was sponsored by Karachi Port Trust, therefore, it was also known as the 2012 KPT Challenge Cup.

The tournament was held in Karachi, from 11 to 23 March 2012 with KPT Stadium and People's Football Stadium hosting all the matches.

Khan Research Laboratories were the defending champions, having won their third title the previous year after defeating National Bank 1–0 in the finals.

Khan Research Laboratories successfully defended their title when they defeated Karachi Electric Supply Corporation 3–1 on penalties after the game had remained goalless at the conclusion of extra-time.

== Teams ==
A total of 16 teams participated in the tournament:

- Khan Research Laboratories^{TH,} ^{PPL}
- WAPDA
- Karachi Port Trust (H)
- Pakistan Army
- Pakistan Airforce
- Pakistan Railways
- Pakistan Navy
- Karachi Electric Supply Corporation
- Pakistan Steel
- National Bank
- National Youth B
- National Youth A
- Gwadar Port Authority
- Pakistan Police
- Ashraf Sugar Mills
- Pakistan Public Work Department

Notes
TH = Challenge Cup title holders; PPL = Pakistan Premier League winners; H = Host

== Group stages ==
=== Group A ===
Pos	Team	Pld	W	D	L	GF	GA	GD	Pts	Qualification
1	WAPDA	2	2	0	0	6	0	+6	6	Advance to Knockout round
2	Pakistan Navy	2	1	0	1	2	3	−1	3	Advance to Knockout round
3	National Youth B	2	0	0	2	0	5	−5	0	
4	Ashraf Sugar Mills	0	0	0	0	0	0	0	0	

Updated to match(es) played on 23 March 2012. Source:
12 March 2012
16:15 PST

National Youth B	0–3	WAPDA
		M. Ahmed 33'; Mehmood 40' (pen.), 90'

KPT Stadium, Karachi

14 March 2012
14:00 PST

Pakistan Navy	2–0	National Youth B
Asif Mehmood 20'; A. Haq 60'

KPT Stadium, Karachi

16 March 2012
16:15 PST

WAPDA	3–0	Pakistan Navy
M. Ahmed 56', 88'; Akram Masih 73'

KPT Stadium, Karachi

=== Group B ===
Pos	Team	Pld	W	D	L	GF	GA	GD	Pts	Qualification
1	Karachi Electric Supply Corporation	3	2	1	0	7	3	+4	7	Advance to Knockout round
2	Karachi Port Trust	3	2	0	1	8	4	+4	6	Advance to Knockout round
3	Pakistan Steel	3	1	0	2	4	5	−1	3	
4	Gwadar Port Authority	3	0	1	2	3	10	−7	1	

Updated to match(es) played on 23 March 2012. Source:
11 March 2012
16:15 PST

Karachi Port Trust	3–0	Pakistan Steel
M. bin Younis 44', 76', 90+2' (pen.)

KPT Stadium, Karachi
13 March 2012
16:15 PST

Karachi Electric Supply Corporation	2–2	Gwadar Port Authority
A. Rehman 18'; Essa 78'		Tariq Badal 1'; Naeem 27'

KPT Stadium, Karachi

15 March 2012
14:00 PST

Karachi Electric Supply Corporation	2–0	Pakistan Steel
Essa 26'; Rasool 89'

People's Football Stadium, Karachi
15 March 2012
14:00 PST

Karachi Port Trust	4–1	Gwadar Port Authority
Waseem 25'; Jamaluddin 36'; M. bin Younis 56'; Zafar Majeed 73'		Tariq Badal 63'

KPT Stadium, Karachi

17 March 2012
16:15 PST

Karachi Electric Supply Corporation	3–1	Karachi Port Trust
Rasool 8', 49', 56'		Jamaluddin 26'

KPT Stadium, Karachi
17 March 2012
16:15 PST

Pakistan Steel	4–0	Gwadar Port Authority
A. Wahab 20', 76'; Naveed Raza 43'; M. Akram 66'

People's Football Stadium, Karachi

=== Group C ===
Pos	Team	Pld	W	D	L	GF	GA	GD	Pts	Qualification
1	Khan Research Laboratories	3	2	1	0	4	3	+1	7	Advance to Knockout round
2	National Youth A	3	1	1	1	3	3	0	4	Advance to Knockout round
3	National Bank	3	0	3	0	3	3	0	3	
4	Pakistan Police	3	0	1	2	2	3	−1	1	

Updated to match(es) played on 23 March 2012. Source:
13 March 2012
14:00 PST

National Youth A	1–2	Khan Research Laboratories
Abdus Salam 82'		Rizwan Asif 44', 61'

KPT Stadium, Karachi
13 March 2012
14:00 PST

Pakistan Police	1–1	National Bank
Naseebullah 52'		Jamil Ahmad 86'

People's Football Stadium, Karachi

15 March 2012
16:15 PST

National Bank	0–0	National Youth A

KPT Stadium, Karachi
15 March 2012
16:15 PST

Khan Research Laboratories	3–0 Awarded	Pakistan Police

People's Football Stadium, Karachi
Referee: Irshad-ul-Haq (DFA Shaikhupura)

The match was abandoned, when Pakistan Police players slapped the referee for awarding penalty to Khan Research Laboratories on 16th minute. Pakistan Football Federation awarded forfeit to Khan Research Laboratories and suspended and fined 6 Pakistan Police players with Rs. 20,000 each.

17 March 2012
14:00 PST

National Bank	2–2	Khan Research Laboratories
A. Aziz 56'; M. Asif 59'		Rizwan Asif 18'; Kaleemullah 62'

KPT Stadium, Karachi
17 March 2012
14:00 PST

Pakistan Police	1–2	National Youth A
Wasim Abbas 75'		Saadullah 15'; A. Salam 66'

People's Football Stadium, Karachi

=== Group D ===
Pos	Team	Pld	W	D	L	GF	GA	GD	Pts	Qualification
1	Pakistan Army	3	2	1	0	5	0	+5	7	Advance to Knockout round
2	Pakistan Public Work Department	3	2	0	1	4	5	−1	6	Advance to Knockout round
3	Pakistan Airforce	3	1	1	1	1	2	−1	4	
4	Pakistan Railways	3	0	0	3	1	4	−3	0	

Updated to match(es) played on 23 March 2012. Source:
12 March 2012
14:00 PST

Pakistan Army	1–0	Pakistan Railways
M. Rashid 32'

KPT Stadium, Karachi
12 March 2012
14:00 PST

Pakistan Public Work Department	2–0	Pakistan Airforce
Sajid 13' (pen.); M. Zubair 21'

People's Football Stadium, Karachi

14 March 2012
16:15 PST

Pakistan Army	4–0	Pakistan Public Work Department
Akhter Hussain 39'; Imran Hussain 50'; Anser Abbas 53'; M. Jamil 87'

People's Football Stadium, Karachi
14 March 2012
16:15 PST

Pakistan Airforce	1–0	Pakistan Railways
M. Sher Ali 82'

People's Football Stadium, Karachi

16 March 2012
14:00 PST

Pakistan Public Work Department	2–1	Pakistan Railways
M. Jaan 78'; Aaqil 86'		M. Amin 54'

People's Football Stadium, Karachi
16 March 2012
14:00 PST

Pakistan Airforce	1–1	Pakistan Army
M. Irfan 90+1'		Rashid 13'

People's Football Stadium, Karachi

== Knockout round ==
=== Quarter-finals ===
18 March 2012
13:00 PST

WAPDA	3–1	Pakistan Public Work Department
Mehmood 49', 85'; Manzoor 55'		Hussain 44'

KPT Stadium, Karachi
18 March 2012
15:45 PST

Pakistan Army	0–0 (a.e.t.)	Pakistan Navy
Penalties
Imran Hussain (penalty scored); Shabbir Hussain (penalty scored); Akhter Hussain (penalty scored); M. Shabbir (penalty missed); Mehmood Ahmed (penalty missed)	3–4	(penalty scored) M. Ramzan; (penalty scored) Nomi Martin Gill; (penalty scored) Shahid Muneer; (penalty scored) A. Haq

KPT Stadium, Karachi

19 March 2012
13:00 PST

Karachi Port Trust	0–3	Khan Research Laboratories
		Rizwan Asif 8', 43', 55'

KPT Stadium, Karachi
19 March 2012
15:45 PST

Karachi Electric Supply Corporation	3–1	National Youth A
Rasool 47', 73', 79'		Saddam Hussain 54'

KPT Stadium, Karachi

=== Semi-finals ===
21 March 2012
13:00 PST

Pakistan Navy	0–1	Khan Research Laboratories
		Kaleemullah 17'

KPT Stadium, Karachi
21 March 2012
15:45 PST

Karachi Electric Supply Corporation	3–0	WAPDA
Rasool 46', 79', 86'

KPT Stadium, Karachi

=== Third place match ===
22 March 2012
16:45 PST

Pakistan Navy	2–2	WAPDA
Sajjad 19'; M. Ramzan 27' (pen.)		Zulfiqar Shah 59'; M. Afzal 69'
Penalties
Shahid Muneer (penalty scored); M. Ramzan (penalty missed); A. Haq (penalty missed)	1–4	(penalty scored) Rana Fakhar; (penalty scored) Zulfiqar Shah; (penalty scored) Akram Masih; (penalty scored) M. Shahid

KPT Stadium, Karachi

=== Finals ===
23 March 2012
16:00 PST

Karachi Electric Supply Corporation	0–0 (a.e.t.)	Khan Research Laboratories
Penalties
Essa (penalty scored); Akber Ali (penalty missed); Ahmad (penalty missed); Rasool (penalty missed)	1–3	(penalty scored) Kaleemullah; (penalty missed) M. Shahid; (penalty missed) Ishaq; (penalty scored) Shahid Ahmed; (penalty scored) Zia Us-Salam

KPT Stadium, Karachi

== Statistics ==
- Fastest goal: 1 minute — Tariq Badal for Gwadar Port Authority against Karachi Electric Supply Corporation (13 March 2012).
- Most hat-tricks: 3 — Muhammad Rasool
  - First player Pakistani player to score hat-trick in three consecutive match since Ali Nawaz, who scored 9 goals against East End Club playing for Dhaka Mohammaden in Dhaka League.

=== Top scorer ===
As of 23 March 2012

Rank	Scorer	Club	Goals
1	Muhammad Rasool	Karachi Electric Supply Corporation	10
2	Rizwan Asif	Khan Research Laboratories	6
3	Mohammad bin Younis	Karachi Port Trust	4
