= Abbas Ali (footballer) =

Pakistani professional footballer

Personal information
- Full name: Abbas Ali
- Date of birth: 3 September 1990 (age 36)
- Place of birth: Quetta, Pakistan
- Positions: Centre-back; defensive midfielder

Senior career*
Years	Team	Apps	(Gls)
2006–2016	National Bank	?	(?)
2007	Quetta Zorawar	?	(?)

International career
2006–2010	Pakistan U23		
2006–2008	Pakistan	11	(0)
Medal record
Representing Pakistan
Winner	South Asian Games	2006
- * Club domestic league appearances and goals

Abbas Ali (born September 3, 1990) is a Pakistani former footballer. Naturally a defensive midfielder, Ali also played as centre-back. He also represented Pakistan national football team.

== Club career ==
In 2004, Abbas featured in the National Youth Football Championship. Ali made his debut in the 2005–06 Pakistan Premier League at the age of 15. He played six out of 22 matches. He scored his first goal in the 2006–07 season against Pakistan Navy, scoring the winner in 89th minute on December 14, 2006.

Ali started playing more as a defensive midfielder rather than a centre-back for the 2007–08 season. Ali scored crucial goals for National Bank, scoring an equaliser against Habib Bank on 15 November 2007 in a 2–1 win for his team. Ali scored his second goal of the season on 5 December, when he scored the lone goal of the match against Khan Research Laboratories in 36th minute. Ali again scored the winner for National Bank, as he scored the only goal of the match against Pakistan Navy in the 15th minute. On 5 January 2008, Ali scored the equaliser against Pakistan Television in 68th minute as the match ended in a 1–1 draw. His fifth and last goal of the season came against PMC Club Athletico in a 5–2 victory.

Ali scored in the National Bank's opening match against Karachi Electric Supply Corporation, scoring equaliser in 37th minute, although National Bank lost the match 2–1. Ali scored in a 6–2 win over Afghan Chaman, achieved the unwanted distinction of becoming the first player in the history of Pakistan Premier League to score a goal and an own goal in the same match when he scored for National Bank in 75th minute and earlier in 30th minute scored an own goal. On 22 October 2008, Ali scored a brace against Pakistan Steel, scoring goals in 22nd and 81st minutes.

In the 2009–10 season Ali scored only one goal, he scored the equaliser against WAPDA in 75th minutes, two minutes after Zulfiqar Shah had given the lead to WAPDA. Ali with National Bank finished 10th, their lowest ranking ever.

Ali's career slowly deteriorated and eventually came to an end amid personal issues, poor fitness, and a lack of commitment over time. After 2015, this was summed with a long lasting football inactivity in the country after a crisis within the Pakistan Football Federation.

== International career ==
Aged only 15, he earned his first senior international cap in a friendly against Macau on 6 April 2006.

He was called by the Pakistan under 23 national team for the 2006 South Asian Games held in Colombo, where he helped Pakistan win the gold medal.

He was subsequently called for the 2007 AFC Asian Cup qualifiers in 2006.

== Career statistics ==
=== International ===
Appearances and goals by year and competition
National team	Year	Apps	Goals
Pakistan	2006	4	0
Pakistan	2007	2	0
Pakistan	2008	5	0
Total		11	0

== Honours ==
=== Pakistan U-23 ===
- South Asian Games: 2006
