= Adeel Ahmed (footballer) =

Pakistani footballer (born 1983)

Personal information
- Full name: Adeel Ahmed
- Date of birth: 25 November 1983 (age 42)
- Place of birth: Nowshera, Pakistan
- Position: Midfielder

Youth career
- 1999–2001: Nowshera Youth

Senior career*
Years	Team	Apps	(Gls)
2001–2006	PTCL	65	(21)
2006–2008	Khan Research Laboratories	46	(9)

International career
2002–2006	Pakistan U23		
1999–2007	Pakistan	21	(1)
- * Club domestic league appearances and goals

Adeel Ahmed (born 25 November 1983) is a Pakistani former footballer who played as a midfielder.

Ahmed won national cup twice with PTCL, in 2003 and 2005, and was the Pakistan Premier League's Player of the Year in 2005–06 and 2006–07. He also won the 2004 and 2006 South Asian Games with the Pakistan under-23 national team.

== Early life ==
Ahmed was born in Nowshera, North-West Frontier Province (now Khyber Pakhtunkhwa) to Zulfiqar Ahmed. He is youngest of seven siblings. His idol growing up was Qazi Ashfaq, the Allied Bank forward, who also captained the national football team. Ahmed started playing football in his school days, joining his youth team Nowshera Youth in 1999.

== Club career ==
=== Pakistan Telecommunication ===
Ahmed started his career with PTCL. On 6 August 2001, he scored his first league goal against Balochistan Red in 2001 National Football Championship. Adeel scored one goal in four appearances as Pakistan Telecommunication were knocked out in quarter-finals by Pakistan Army.

In 2002 National Football Championship Ahmed scored a brace against Sui Southern Gas in the final group stage match, scoring his first in 40th and second 44th minute. Ahmed finished the tournament with two goals in three matches as they were once again knocked out in quarter finals, this time by Allied Bank.

The 2003 National Football Championship was breakthrough for Ahmed as he scored five goals in six appearances. On 26 April, he scored a brace against Pakistan Police in the opening fixture of group stages, scoring in 3rd and 35th minute in a 2–0 win. In the second group stage match, Ahmed scored another brace against Balochistan Red, scoring in 20th and 74th minute in a 2–0 win. In Round of 16 match, Adeel scored the only goal of the match on 71st minute against Allied Bank in a 1–0 victory. Pakistan Telecommunication was knocked out in quarter finals for third consecutive season, as eventual winners WAPDA defeated them 1–0. In the 2003 National Football Challenge Cup Ahmed in the opening match against Habib Bank in a 1–1 draw. Ahmed's second goal of the tournament was against Pakistan Airforce in 4–0 victory, with Ahmed scoring the second goal of the team and attacking partner Muhammad Essa scoring the hat-trick. Pakistan Telecommunication won the tournament, marking Ahmed's first silverware as Pakistan Telecommunication won the tournament on a coin toss after match ended 1–1. Coin toss was used as the chief guest Governor of Balochistan Owais Ahmed Ghani could not wait for the penalty shoot-outs. Adeel played in All-Pakistan PTCL Floodlite Football Tournament, scoring his first goal against Pakistan Navy. On 18 July, he scored his first senior hat-trick against Afghan Chaman in a 7–0 win. Two days later, he scored the opening goal against DFA Bahawalpur. In finals Ahmed scored his second senior and career hat-trick against Pakistan Army. Ahmed scored in 16th, 44th and 71st minute as Pakistan Telecommunication won the finals 4–0 and Ahmed finished as the top-scorer with seven goals in five matches. Ahmed won his third trophy in 2003 when Pakistan Telecommunication won the 3rd All Pakistan Tufail Shaheed (Nishan-e-Haider) Flood-lit Football Tournament. Ahmed scored his only goal of the tournament against DFA Pak Pattan in quarter-finals. In All Pakistan Golden Jubilee Football Tournament, Ahmed scored a hat-trick against Tanzeem Sports as Pakistan Telecommunication lost 2–1 to Karachi Port Trust in the finals, Ahmed scored the opening goal in the finals.

==== Pakistan Premier League ====
Ahmed scored his first goal of newly formed Pakistan Premier League against Karachi Port Trust in a 3–2 loss. His second goal of the season was against Mauripur Baloch scoring in 83rd minute. On 1 October 2004, Ahmed scored a brace against Wohaib. Ahmed's last goal of the season was in the last game of the season against Allied Bank. Ahmed ended his season with five goals in thirty appearances. Ahmed ended his season with winning the 2005 National Football Challenge Cup. Ahmed scored the opening goal in the opening game against Sindh Government Press in a 1–0 victory. His second goal was against National Bank finding the goal in the 11th minute. Ahmed scored four goals against Higher Education Commission in a 9–2 victory. He scored his first goal in 45th minute, with second, third and fourth in 81st, 87th and 89th minute respectively. In the final game of second stage Ahmed scored a brace against Karachi Port Trust. Ahmed scored his team's second in 32nd minute against Khan Research Laboratories in the semi-finals. Ahmed won his second National Challenge Cup title after Pakistan Telecommunication won the finals 2–1 with Ahmed scoring in the 11th minute.

In his last season with Pakistan Telecommunication, Ahmed scored eight goals in 22 matches, which included a hat-trick and a brace against Afghan Chaman and Pakistan Public Work Department. Ahmed won the Player of the Year award for 2005–06 season.

=== Khan Research Laboratories ===
Ahmed along with his attacking partner Muhammad Essa joined Khan Research Laboratories after Pakistan Telecommunication was dissolved by the parent organisation at the end of 2005–06 season. Ahmed scored his first goal the Khan Research Laboratories in his second match against Pakistan Navy in a 1–0 victory on 14 September 2006. He scored in a 2–2 draw with National Bank. He scored his last goal of the season against Pakistan Army in a 1–0 win. His first season with Rawalpindi outfit ended with five goals in 20 matches. Ahmed became the first and only player to win consecutive Player of the Year awards when he won the award for his 2006–07 season.

In 2007–08 season Ahmed scored his first goal in his fourth match against newly promoted Pakistan Railways, scoring the lone goal of the match in 5th minute. Ahmed scored his sixth career hat-trick against Pakistan Television, finding the back of the net in 56th, 63rd and 81st minute. His league season ended with four goals in 26 appearances. In 2008 National Football Challenge Cup, he scored in a 1–0 win over Pak Elektron, scoring once in six games as Khan Research Laboratories finished runners-up to Pakistan Navy. After the end of the season where he contracted a serious knee injury, Ahmed retired from football.

== International career ==
Adeel was first called by the Pakistan under-16 team in 1998 to play the World Cup qualifiers round.

The next year he represented the senior Pakistan national team in the 1999 South Asian Games in Nepal. In 2001, Ahmed was called for national team for 2002 FIFA World Cup qualifiers. Ahmed also played against Kyrgyzstan for 2006 FIFA World Cup qualifiers with Pakistan losing both games home and away 0–2 and 4–0 respectively. On 6 April 2006 Ahmed scored his first and only goal for national team against Macau in 2006 AFC Challenge Cup, he scored the opening goal at 12th minute in a 2–2 draw. On 11 October 2006, Ahmed was booked in a match against Jordan in 2007 AFC Asian Cup qualifiers at the Punjab Stadium, Lahore.

Ahmed was also called by the Pakistan under-23 national team for the 2004 and 2006 South Asian Games, where he helped Pakistan win the gold medal. In 2006, in the final against Sri Lanka, ended in a victory for the Green Shirts thanks to a goal by Adeel in the half time.

== Career statistics ==
=== Club ===
As of 30 January 2007

Appearances and goals by club, season and competition
Club	Season	League			Cup		Other		Total	
Club	Season	Division	Apps	Goals	Apps	Goals	Apps	Goals	Apps	Goals
Pakistan Telecommunication	2001	National Football Championship	4	1	2	1	—		6	2
Pakistan Telecommunication	2002	National Football Championship	3	2	3	2	—		6	4
Pakistan Telecommunication	2003	National Football Championship	6	5	6	2	8	13	20	20
Pakistan Telecommunication	2004–05	Pakistan Premier League	30	5	6	9	—		36	14
Pakistan Telecommunication	2005–06	Pakistan Premier League	22	8	—		—		22	8
Pakistan Telecommunication	Total		65	21	17	14	8	13	90	48
Khan Research Laboratories	2006–07	Pakistan Premier League	20	5	—		—		20	5
Khan Research Laboratories	2007–08	Pakistan Premier League	26	4	5	1	—		31	5
Khan Research Laboratories	Total		46	9	5	1	—	—	51	10
Career total			111	30	22	15	8	13	141	58

=== International ===
Appearances and goals by national team and year
Pakistan	Year	Apps	Goals
Pakistan	2001	3	0
Pakistan	2002	2	0
Pakistan	2003	2	0
Pakistan	2004	1	0
Pakistan	2005	5	0
Pakistan	2006	7	1
Pakistan	2007	1	0
Total		21	1

Scores and results list Pakistan's goal tally first, score column indicates score after each Ahmed goal.

List of international goals scored by Adeel Ahmed
No.	Date	Venue	Opponent	Score	Result	Competition
1	6 April 2006	Bangabandhu National Stadium, Dhaka, Bangladesh	Macau	1–0	2–2	2006 AFC Challenge Cup

== Honours ==
Pakistan Telecommunication

- National Football Challenge Cup: 2003, 2005
- All-Pakistan PTCL Flood-lite Football Tournament: 2003
- All Pakistan Tufail Shaheed (Nishan-e-Haider) Flood-lite Football Tournament: 2003

=== Individual ===
- Player of the Year: 2005–06, 2006–07

=== Pakistan U23 ===
- South Asian Games: 2004, 2006
