= Zulfiqar Ali Shah (footballer) =

Pakistani footballer

Personal information
- Full name: Zulfiqar Ali Shah
- Date of birth: 25 November 1980 (age 45)
- Place of birth: Jacobabad, Pakistan
- Height: 1.60 m (5 ft 3 in)
- Position: Midfielder

Youth career
- 1994–1996: Hussain Baloch FC
- 1996–1998: Shaheed Abdul Rehman FC

Senior career*
Years	Team	Apps	(Gls)
1998–1999	Sindh Government Press		
1999–2000	Allied Bank		
2001–2011	WAPDA		

International career
2002–2009	Pakistan	5	(0)
- * Club domestic league appearances and goals

Zulfiqar Ali Shah (born 25 November 1980) is a Pakistani former footballer who played as a midfielder.

== Early life ==
Shah was born on 25 November 1980 in Jacobabad, in the Sindh province of Pakistan. He passed the inter examination from Government Degree College. He started playing football as a striker with Hussain Baloch Football Club in 1994. Later, in 1996, he joined Shaheed Abdul Rehman FC of Jacobabad and is still a part of this team.

== Club career ==
He first played the National Football Championship and Habib Bank Gold Cup for Sindh Government Press in 1998, and later joined Allied Bank along with his teammate Khuda Bakhsh in 1999.

He later joined WAPDA along with his teammate Khuda Bakhsh in 2001, winning several National Football Championship and Pakistan Premier League titles. Shah was the second top scorer at the 2007–08 Pakistan Premier League behind Arif Mehmood. He scored a goal in the 2008 AFC President's Cup against Nepal Police Club, and at the 2009 AFC President's Cup in the semifinals against Regar-TadAZ.

== International career ==
Shah was part of the national youth team at 1998 AFC Youth Championship qualification in group 6 in Bangalore. In the same year, he played against Maldives and India in the Asian U-19 Championship qualifiers held in Peshawar. He made his senior international debut with Pakistan in 2002 during the tour to Sri Lanka.

== Honours ==
Allied Bank

- National Football Championship: 1999, 2000
- National Football Challenge Cup: 1999

WAPDA

- National Football Championship: 2000–01, 2001–02
- Pakistan Premier League: 2004–05, 2007–08, 2008–09, 2010–11
