= List of football stadiums in Pakistan =

This is a list of major football stadiums in Pakistan, ranked in order of capacity, with the minimum capacity being 1,000.

== Current stadiums ==
Image	Stadium	Capacity	City	Province	Home team(s)
	Jinnah Sports Stadium	48,700	Islamabad	Islamabad Capital Territory	Pakistan national football team
	People's Football Stadium	40,000	Karachi	Sindh	Pakistan national football team
	Ayub National Stadium	20,000	Quetta	Balochistan	
	Ibn-e-Qasim Bagh Stadium	18,000	Multan	Punjab	
	Qayyum Stadium	15,000	Peshawar	Khyber Pakhtunkhwa	
	KPT Football Stadium	15,000	Karachi	Sindh	Karachi Port Trust
	KMC Football Stadium	15,000	Karachi	Sindh	
	Dring Stadium	15,000	Bahawalpur	Punjab	
	Punjab Stadium	10,000	Lahore	Punjab	Pakistan national football team
	Hyderabad Football Stadium	10,000	Hyderabad	Sindh, Pakistan	
	Qayyum Papa Stadium	10,000	Quetta	Balochistan	
	KRL Football Stadium	8,000	Rawalpindi	Punjab	Khan Research Laboratories
	Army Stadium	7,000	Rawalpindi	Punjab	Pakistan Army
	Tehmas Khan Football Stadium	6,000	Peshawar	Khyber Pakhtunkhwa	
	Korangi Baloch Stadium	5,000	Karachi	Sindh	Korangi Baloch FC
	Drigh Road Union Football Stadium	5,000	Karachi	Sindh	
	Railway Stadium	5,000	Lahore	Punjab	Pakistan Railways
	Sadiq Shaheed Stadium	5,000	Quetta	Balochistan	Muslim FC
	Model Town C-Block Ground	3,000	Lahore	Punjab	
	Railways Ground	2,000	Faisalabad	Punjab	Lyallpur
	Karachi United Stadium	2,000	Karachi	Sindh	Karachi United
	PAF Sports Complex, Islamabad		Islamabad	Islamabad Capital Territory	Pakistan Air Force
	PAF Sports Complex, Peshawar		Peshawar	Khyber Pakhtunkhwa	Pakistan Air Force
	Raiders FC Ground	1,000	Lahore	Punjab	Raiders FC
	Nushki Stadium	1,000	Nushki	Balochistan	Baloch FC Nushki
	Municipal Football Stadium	1,000	Rawalpindi	Punjab	
	Naval Sports Complex, Islamabad		Islamabad	Islamabad Capital Territory	Pakistan Navy
	Naval Sports Complex, Karachi		Karachi	Sindh	Pakistan Navy

== See also ==
- List of stadiums in Pakistan
- List of association football stadiums by capacity
- List of association football stadiums by country
- Football in Pakistan
