= Zahid Hameed =

Pakistani footballer (born 1985)

Personal information
- Full name: Zahid Hameed
- Date of birth: August 1, 1985 (age 41)
- Place of birth: Quetta, Pakistan
- Height: 5 ft 7 in (1.70 m)
- Position: Midfielder

Senior career*
Years	Team	Apps	(Gls)
2001–2004	PTCL		
2005–2014	WAPDA		
2007	Quetta Zorawar		
2014	Aqua Pure Water		

International career
2004–2007	Pakistan U23		
2003–2008	Pakistan	21	(1)
Medal record
Representing Pakistan
South Asian Games
Men's Football
Gold medal – first place	2004 Islamabad	Team
Gold medal – first place	2006 Colombo	Team
- * Club domestic league appearances and goals

Zahid Hameed (born 1 August 1985) is a Pakistani former footballer who played as a midfielder who captained the Pakistan national football team.

== Club career ==
Hameed played for PTCL Islamabad until joining WAPDA, winning four Pakistan Premier League titles with them in 2005, 2008, 2009 and 2011. He also played for departmental side Aqua Pure Water in 2014.

== International career ==
He earned his first senior international cap during the 2006 World Cup qualifiers held in 2003 against Kyrgyzstan, and scored his first goal in the 2008 AFC Challenge Cup qualifiers against Guam.

Hameed won the 2004 and 2006 South Asian Games with the Pakistan under 23 national team.

In 2007, Hameed led the Pakistan under-23 team as captain at the Football at the 2008 Summer Olympics Qualifiers where his side beat Singapore in a home and away series to qualify for the second round.

Due to Muhammad Essa's injury, Hameed was named Pakistan national team captain for 2008 SAFF Championship.

== Coaching career ==
After retirement, Hameed acted as assistant coach of departmental side Pakistan Petroleum at the 2018 National Challenge Cup. The club finished at the third position after defeating Pakistan Civil Aviation Authority.

== Career statistics ==
=== International ===
Appearances and goals by national team and year
National team	Year	Apps	Goals
Pakistan	2003	2	0
Pakistan	2005	9	0
Pakistan	2006	4	0
Pakistan	2009	6	1
Total		21	1

Scores and results list Pakistan's goal tally first, score column indicates score after each Hameed goal.

List of international goals scored by Zahid Hameed
No.	Date	Venue	Opponent	Score	Result	Competition
1	6 April 2008	Taipei, Taiwan	Guam	6–0	9–2	2008 AFC Challenge Cup qualifiers

== Honours ==
WAPDA

- Pakistan Premier League: 2004–05, 2007–08, 2008–09, 2010–11

=== Pakistan U23 ===
- South Asian Games: 2004, 2006

== See also ==
- List of Pakistan national football team captains
