= Muhammad Imran (footballer) =

Pakistani footballer (born 1986)

Mohammad Imran
Personal information
- Full name: Mohammad Imran
- Date of birth: November 15, 1986 (age 39)
- Place of birth: Toba Tek Singh, Pakistan
- Height: 1.77 m (5 ft 10 in)
- Position: Left back

Senior career*
Years	Team	Apps	(Gls)
2004	Allied Bank		
2005	PTCL		
2005–2011	Pakistan Army		

International career
2006	Pakistan U23		
2005–2008	Pakistan	25	(0)
Medal record
Representing Pakistan
Winner	South Asian Games	2006
- * Club domestic league appearances and goals

Mohammad Imran (Urdu: محمد عمران; born on November 15, 1986) is a Pakistani former footballer who played as a defender.

== Early life ==
Nicknamed Lefty, Imran was born in Pir Mahal, in Toba Tek Singh district of Pakistan.

== Club career ==
Imran started his career at Allied Bank in 2004. He moved to PTCL the next year.

In 2005, Imran moved to Pakistan Army F.C. He won the Pakistan Premier League with Pakistan Army in 2006 and 2007. Imran was also declared Most Valuable Player (MVP) of Pakistan Premier League 2007-08. He also participated in the AFC President's Cup with the club.

== International career ==
In April 2005, Imran was selected at the 2005 Islamic Solidarity Games. Imran senior debut was on 12 June 2005, in the first of a three-game series against India, the game ended in a 1–1 draw. He was subsequently called for the 2005 SAFF Gold Cup. He later played at the 2007 AFC Asian Cup qualification.

Imran was also called by the Pakistan under-23 national team for the 2006 South Asian Games held in Colombo, where he helped Pakistan win the gold medal.

In 2007, Imran also played for Pakistan under-23 team at the Football at the 2008 Summer Olympics Qualifiers where Pakistan defeated Singapore in a home and away series to qualify for the second round.

In 2008, he featured at the 2008 AFC Challenge Cup qualification and the 2008 SAFF Championship. He last played in October 2008, in a friendly against Malaysia.

== Career statistics ==
=== International ===
Appearances and goals by year and competition
National team	Year	Apps	Goals
Pakistan	2005	8	0
Pakistan	2008	9	0
Pakistan	2009	8	0
Total		25	0

== Honours ==
Pakistan Army

- Pakistan Premier League: 2005–06, 2006–07

=== Pakistan U23 ===
- South Asian Games: 2006

Awards
Preceded by Adeel Ahmed	Pakistan Premier League Most Valuable Player; 2007/08	Succeeded by Samar Ishaq
