= 2007–08 Pakistan Premier League =

Pakistan football season

Pakistan Premier League
- Season: 2007–08
- Champions: WAPDA F.C. 2nd Premier League title 6th Pakistani title
- Relegated: Pakistan Railways F.C. Wohaib F.C.
- AFC President's Cup: WAPDA F.C.
- Matches: 180
- Goals: 448 (2.49 per match)
- Best player: Muhammad Imran
- Top goalscorer: Arif Mehmood (21 goals)
- Best goalkeeper: Amir Qureshi
- Biggest home win: WAPDA 7–1 Wohaib (5 January 2008)
- Biggest away win: Habib Bank 0–5 Pakistan Navy (10 December 2007)
- Highest scoring: Pakistan Army 5–3 Pakistan Television (24 November 2007); WAPDA 7–1 Wohaib (5 January 2008)
- Longest winning run: 14 games Pakistan Army; WAPDA
- Longest unbeaten run: 26 games WAPDA
- Longest winless run: 22 games Wohaib
- Longest losing run: 19 games Wohaib

The 2007–08 season was the 53rd season of Pakistan domestic football and the 4th season of the Pakistan Premier League. It was held from November 1, 2007 to February 6, 2008, under the auspices of Pakistan Football Federation.

== Changes ==
The Pakistan Football Federation had recently made changes to the league. It was announced that the league strength had been increased to a total of 14 teams with Habib Bank Limited, which was relegated after winning 2 and drawing 6 out of their 20 games the previous season, had been granted permission to field its team. Similarly, Pakistan Airlines, which had withdrawn its entry from the last year's edition at the eleventh hour, were also to feature in the coming event.

== Format ==
The winners will represent Pakistan at the 2008 AFC President's Cup. The bottom two teams will be relegated to the Pakistan Football Federation League and two teams (winners and runners-up) from Pakistan Football Federation League will be promoted for the 2008-09 edition.

The matches will be held at 13:00 PST and 15:00 PST respectively on home and away basis.

This season the winning prize will be Rs. 500,000, the runners-up team will receive Rs 300,000 while the third position holder will receive Rs 100,000. All matches are likely to be supervised by neutral referees.

== Venues ==
The 2007–08 Pakistan Premier League was staged across designated hubs rather than strict home stadia: Karachi (Peoples Sports Complex, Korangi Baloch Stadium, KPT Stadium, CDGK Stadium), Lahore (Railway Stadium, Punjab University Old Campus), Rawalpindi (Army Stadium, KRL Football Stadium), Islamabad (Naval Sports Complex, Jinnah Stadium), and Chaman (Government High School). Peshawar, which was also under consideration to host few matches, has been left out of the venues’ list due to financial constraints.

== Teams ==
=== Stadia and locations ===
Location of teams in Pakistan Premier League 2007–08

Club	City/State
Afghan Chaman	Chaman
Habib Bank	Karachi
Karachi Electric Supply Corporation	Karachi
Karachi Port Trust	Karachi
Khan Research Laboratories	Rawalpindi
Pakistan Airlines	Karachi
National Bank	Karachi
Pakistan Army	Rawalpindi
Pakistan Navy	Islamabad
Pakistan Television	Islamabad
Pakistan Railways	Lahore
PMC Club Athletico Faisalabad	Faisalabad
WAPDA	Lahore
Wohaib	Lahore

== Season summary ==
The league title went to the final day of the season, with a match between Pakistan Army and WAPDA, with Army only needing a draw to retain their title, however WAPDA went on to win the match 2–1 after two goals from Arif Mehmood completing the comeback after being 0–1 down by a goal from Imran Hussain.

WAPDA won their second Premier League title and sixth top division title and became the first team to end a season undefeated.

Wohaib and Pakistan Railways were relegated to the PFF League and will be replaced next season by PFF League winners Pak Elektron and runner-ups Pakistan Steel.

== Final standings ==
Pos	Team	Pld	W	D	L	GF	GA	GD	Pts	Qualification or relegation
1	WAPDA	26	16	10	0	64	23	+41	58	Qualification to 2008 AFC President's Cup
2	Pakistan Army	26	17	6	3	41	10	+31	57	
3	Khan Research Laboratories	26	15	8	3	45	13	+32	53	
4	Karachi Port Trust	26	12	8	6	36	24	+12	44	
5	National Bank	26	11	10	5	36	31	+5	43	
6	Pakistan Airlines	26	9	12	5	32	23	+9	39	
7	Pakistan Navy	26	9	11	6	36	26	+10	38	
8	Karachi Electric Supply Corporation	26	8	8	10	27	30	−3	32	
9	Afghan Chaman	26	5	12	9	23	29	−6	27	
10	Habib Bank	26	7	4	15	35	42	−7	25	
11	Pakistan Television	26	6	5	15	20	45	−25	23	
12	PMC Club Athletico Faisalabad	26	5	7	14	19	43	−24	22	
13	Pakistan Railways (R)	26	4	7	15	22	51	−29	19	Relegation to 2008-09 PFF League
14	Wohaib (R)	26	1	5	20	11	60	−49	8	Relegation to 2008-09 PFF League

Updated to match(es) played on 1 March 2008. Source: PFF
Rules for classification: 1) points; 2) goal difference; 3) number of goals scored.
(R) Relegated

Pakistan Premier League 2007–08

2nd title

== Season statistics ==
=== Scoring ===
- Fastest goal in a match: 43 seconds – Essa for Khan Research Laboratories against Habib Bank (12 December 2007)
- First hat-trick of the season: Adeel Ahmed for Khan Research Laboratories against Pakistan Television (19 November 2007)
- Widest winning margin: 6 goals – WAPDA 7–1 Wohaib (5 January 2008)
- Most hat-tricks scored by one player: 2
  - Arif Mehmood for WAPDA
    - WAPDA 7–1 Wohaib (5 January 2008)
    - WAPDA 4–0 Habib Bank (13 January 2008)
- Most hat-tricks by a team: 3
  - Khan Research Laboratories
    - Adeel Ahmed v Pakistan Television (19 November 2007)
    - Muhammad Rasool v National Bank (26 December 2007)
    - Yasir Afridi v Afghan Chaman (15 January 2008)
  - WAPDA
    - Arif Mehmood v Habib Bank (13 January 2008)
    - Zulfiqar Ali Shah v Wohaib (5 January 2008)
    - Arif Mehmood v Wohaib (5 January 2008)
      - This is the first time in the Premier League that two players has scored a hat-trick in a single match.
- Team with most goals scored: 64 goals – WAPDA
- Team with fewest goals scored: 11 goals – Wohaib
- Team with fewest goals conceded: 10 goals – Pakistan Army
- Team with most goals conceded: 57 goals – Wohaib

==== Top scorers ====
Rank	Scorer	Club	Goals
1	Arif Mehmood	WAPDA	21
2	Zulfiqar Ali Shah	WAPDA	18
3	Imran Hussain	Pakistan Army	17
4	Shakir Lashari	Pakistan Airlines	10
4	Ishtiaq Ahmed	Habib Bank	10
4	Abdul Rehman	Karachi Port Trust	10
7	Farooq Shah	National Bank	9
7	Muhammad Essa	Khan Research Laboratories	9
7	Muhammad Qasim	Khan Research Laboratories	9

==== Hat-tricks ====
Player	For	Against	Result	Date
Adeel Ahmed	Khan Research Laboratories	Pakistan Television	4–1	19 November 2007
Abdul Rehman	Karachi Port Trust	Pakistan Railways	3–2	22 November 2007
Imran Hussain	Pakistan Army	Pakistan Television	5–3	24 November 2007
Nomi Martin Gill	Pakistan Navy	Habib Bank	5–0	10 December 2007
Muhammad Rasool	Khan Research Laboratories	National Bank	3–0	26 December 2007
Zulfiqar Ali Shah	WAPDA	Wohaib	7–1	5 January 2008
Arif Mehmood^{4}	WAPDA	Wohaib	7–1	5 January 2008
Arif Mehmood	WAPDA	Habib Bank	4–2	13 January 2008
Yasir Afridi	Khan Research Laboratories	Afghan Chaman	5–0	15 January 2008

^{4} Player scored four goals
