= Naval Sports Complex, Islamabad =

Sports Complex in Islamabad, Pakistan

Naval Sports Complex
- مجتمع ورزشی بحریہ
- Full name: Naval Sports Complex, Islamabad
- Location: Naval Headquarters Complex, Sector E-8, Islamabad, Pakistan
- Owner: Pakistan Navy
- Operator: Pakistan Navy

Tenant
- Pakistan Navy football team

The Naval Sports Complex is a sports complex within the Pakistan Navy's headquarters complex in Sector E-8, Islamabad, Pakistan. Its football ground has served as a home venue of the Pakistan Navy football team.

The Islamabad venue is different from the Naval Sports Complex at Karsaz in Karachi, which has also hosted Pakistan Navy home matches.

== Football use ==
The ground was one of the Islamabad–Rawalpindi venues selected for the inaugural 2004 National A Division Football League. The ground has served as venue in the latter 2005, 2008, and 2009 seasons of the Pakistan Premier League. The 2006–07, and 2007–08 seasons were held instead in the Karsaz based Naval Sports Complex.

As a ground inside a military installation, public access has been restricted for security reasons.

== See also ==
- List of football stadiums in Pakistan
- Pakistan Navy football team
