= Amir Qureshi =

Pakistani footballer (born 1974)

Personal information
- Full name: Hamir Ali Qureshi
- Date of birth: 4 November 1980 (age 45)
- Place of birth: Rawalpindi, Pakistan
- Height: 1.85 m (6 ft 1 in)
- Position: Goalkeeper

Senior career*
Years	Team	Apps	(Gls)
1999–2013	Khan Research Laboratories	?	(?)

International career
2008	Pakistan	2	(0)
- * Club domestic league appearances and goals

Amir Ali Qureshi (born 4 November 1980) is a Pakistani former footballer who played as a goalkeeper.

== Club career ==
He played all his career for KRL FC, and was awarded Pakistan Premier League Goalkeeper of the Year in the 2007–08 season.

== International career ==
Amir was called to the national squad earning two international caps during the 2008 AFC Challenge Cup qualifiers against Chinese Taipei and Sri Lanka, finishing in 2–1 victory and a 1–7 defeat respectively.

== See also ==
- List of one-club men in association football

Awards
Preceded by New Award	Pakistan Premier League Goalkeeper of the year 2007/08	Succeeded by Abdul Aziz
