= 2017 NBP President's Cup =

Tournament details
- Country: Pakistan
- Venues: 2 venues in Karachi
- Dates: 17 January – 26 January
- Teams: 12

Final positions
- Champions: Khan Research Laboratories (1st title)
- Runners-up: WAPDA
- Third place: K-Electric
- Fourth place: Sui Southern Gas

Tournament statistics
- Matches played: 20
- Goals scored: 58 (2.9 per match)
- Top goal scorer: Murtaza Hussain (8 goals)
- All statistics correct as of January 26, 2017.

The 2017 NBP President's Cup was the first edition of NBP President's Cup. The standalone tournament was sponsored by National Bank of Pakistan in 2017, as there was no footballing activity in Pakistan since 2016 PFF Cup, during the suspension of official PFF competitions due to the crisis within the federation. The tournament commenced on 17 January and concluded on 26 January.

Khan Research Laboratories won the tournament after defeating WAPDA 1–0 in finals. K-Electric won the third place match after defeating Sui Southern Gas 1–0.

== Teams ==
The 12 teams participating in the tournament are as below:

- K-Electric
- Karachi United
- Karachi Port Trust
- Khan Research Laboratories
- National Bank
- Pakistan Airlines
- Pakistan Navy
- Pakistan Police
- Pakistan Steel
- Sui Southern Gas
- Sui Northern Gas
- WAPDA

== Group stage ==
=== Group A ===
Pos	Team	Pld	W	D	L	GF	GA	GD	Pts	Qualification
1	Karachi United	2	1	0	1	2	1	+1	3	Advance to Knockout round
2	WAPDA	2	1	0	1	2	2	0	3	Advance to Knockout round
3	Pakistan Steel	2	1	0	1	1	2	−1	3	

Updated to match(es) played on 24 January 2017. Source:
17 January 2017
13:00 PST

Pakistan Steel	1–0	Karachi United
Ubaid Khan 75'

KPT Football Stadium, Karachi
19 January 2017
13:00 PST

Karachi United	2–0	WAPDA
Asif Khan 51'; Noman Dodo 79'	Report

KPT Football Stadium, Karachi
21 January 2017
13:00 PST

WAPDA	2–0	Pakistan Steel
Jadeed 51'; Mehmood 85'	Report

KPT Football Stadium, Karachi

=== Group B ===
Pos	Team	Pld	W	D	L	GF	GA	GD	Pts	Qualification
1	Khan Research Laboratories	2	2	0	0	6	2	+4	6	Advance to Knockout round
2	Sui Southern Gas	2	1	0	1	4	4	0	3	Advance to Knockout round
3	Pakistan Navy	2	0	0	2	0	4	−4	0	

Updated to match(es) played on unknown. Source:
18 January 2017
15:00 PST

Sui Southern Gas	2–0	Pakistan Navy
M. Lal 17', 24'

Benazir Sports Complex, Karachi
20 January 2017
13:00 PST

Khan Research Laboratories	2–0	Pakistan Navy
Murtaza Hussain 28'; M. Imran 46'	Report

KPT Football Stadium, Karachi
22 January 2017
13:00 PST

Sui Southern Gas	2–4	Khan Research Laboratories
Saeed 10'; Hameed Khan 85' (pen.)	Report	Murtaza Hussain 25', 62'; Ahmed 63'; Umair Ali 67'

KPT Football Stadium, Karachi

=== Group C ===
Pos	Team	Pld	W	D	L	GF	GA	GD	Pts	Qualification
1	K-Electric	2	2	0	0	5	4	+1	6	Advance to Knockout round
2	Sui Northern Gas	2	1	0	1	5	4	+1	3	Advance to Knockout round
3	Pakistan Airlines	2	0	0	2	0	4	−4	0	

Updated to match(es) played on unknown. Source:
18 January 2017
13:00 PST

K-Electric	2–1	Pakistan Airlines
Kaleemullah 72'; Rasool 85' (pen.)		Lashari 58'

KPT Football Stadium, Karachi
20 January 2017
15:00 PST

Sui Northern Gas	2–1	Pakistan Airlines
Sada Bahar 57'; Owais Riasat 90'	Report	Lashari 75'

Benazir Sports Complex, Karachi
22 January 2017
15:00 PST

Sui Northern Gas	3–3	K-Electric
Shahzad Mehmood 14'; Syed Ghazi 40'; Sada Bahar 65'	Report	Rasool 70', 80', 86'
Penalties
	8–9

Benzair Sports Complex, Karachi

=== Group D ===
Pos	Team	Pld	W	D	L	GF	GA	GD	Pts	Qualification
1	National Bank	2	1	1	0	5	3	+2	4	Advance to Knockout round
2	Karachi Port Trust	2	0	2	0	2	2	0	2	Advance to Knockout round
3	Pakistan Police	2	0	1	1	3	5	−2	1	

Updated to match(es) played on 24 January 2017. Source:
17 January 2017
15:00 PST

Karachi Port Trust	1–1	National Bank
Zafar Majeed 55'		Waseem Qadir 81'

Benazir Sports Complex, Karachi
19 January 2017
15:00 PST

Karachi Port Trust	1–1	Pakistan Police
M. bin Younis 80'	Report	A. Wasif 90+1'

Benazir Sports Complex, Karachi
21 January 2017
15:00 PST

National Bank	4–2	Pakistan Police
M. Zeeshan 25'; Maqbool 31', 68'; Javed Hamza 47'	Report	Noor Muhammad 72' (pen.); Waqas 80'

KPT Football Stadium, Karachi

== Knockout round ==
=== Quarter-finals ===
23 January 2017
13:00 PST

K-Electric	4–1	Karachi United
Essa 48'; Kaleemullah 57', 72'; Rasool 82'	Report	Noman Dodo 70'

Benazir Sports Complex, Karachi
23 January 2017
15:00 PST

Karachi Port Trust	0–3	Khan Research Laboratories
	Report	M. Imran 40', 43'; Murtaza Hussain 48'

KPT Football Stadium, Karachi

24 January 2017
13:00 PST

National Bank	0–1	Sui Southern Gas
	Report	M. Lal 45'

KPT Football Stadium, Karachi
24 January 2017
15:00 PST

Sui Northern Gas	0–0	WAPDA
	Report
Penalties
	10–11

Benazir Sports Complex, Karachi

=== Semifinals ===
25 January 2017
13:00 PST

Khan Research Laboratories	4–3	K-Electric
Murtaza Hussain 30', 45', 120+1'; Afridi 90'	Report	Rasool 19'; Riaz 48', 63'

KPT Football Stadium, Karachi
25 January 2017
15:00 PST

WAPDA	2–1	Sui Southern Gas
Mehmood 45'; M. Bilal 52'	Report	Hameed Khan 27'

Benazir Sports Complex, Karachi

=== Third place match ===
26 January 2017
13:00 PST

K-Electric	1–0	Sui Southern Gas
Rasool 11'	Report

Benazir Sports Complex, Karachi

=== Finals ===
26 January 2017
13:00 PST

Khan Research Laboratories	1–0	WAPDA
Murtaza Hussain 35'	Report

KPT Football Stadium, Karachi

=== Bracket ===
Quarter-finals
23 January – 13:00 PM
K-Electric	4
Karachi United	1
23 January – 15:00 PM
Karachi Port Trust	0
Khan Research Laboratories	3
24 January – 13:00 PM
National Bank	0
Sui Southern Gas	1
24 January – 15:00 PM
Sui Northern Gas	0 (10)
WAPDA (P)	0 (11)

Semi-finals
25 January – 13:00 PM
K-Electric	3
Khan Research Laboratories	4
25 January – 13:00 PM
Sui Southern Gas	1
WAPDA	2

Final
26 January – 15:00 PM
Khan Research Laboratories	1
WAPDA	0
Third place
26 January – 13:00 PM
K-Electric	1
Sui Southern Gas	0

== Top scorers ==
As of 26 January 2017

Position	Player	Club	Goals
1	Murtaza Hussain	Khan Research Laboratories	8
2	Muhammad Rasool	K-Electric	7
3	Kaleemullah Khan	K-Electric	3
3	Muhammad Imran	Khan Research Laboratories	3
3	Muhammad Lal	Sui Southern Gas	3
6	Arif Mehmood	WAPDA	2
6	Hameed Khan	Sui Southern Gas	2
6	Maqbool	National Bank	2
6	Muhammad Riaz	K-Electric	2
6	Noman Dodo	Karachi United	2
6	Sada Bahar	Sui Northern Gas	2
6	Shakir Lashari	Pakistan Airlines	2
