= Muhammad Ahmed (footballer, born 1988) =

Pakistani footballer

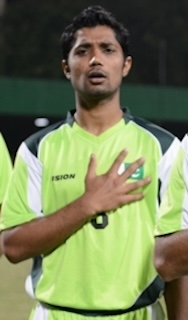
- Ahmed with Pakistan in 2013

Personal information
- Full name: Muhammad Ahmed Islam
- Date of birth: 3 January 1988 (age 38)
- Place of birth: Lahore, Pakistan
- Height: 1.80 m (5 ft 11 in)
- Position: Centre back

Youth career
- 2002–2003: Wohaib

Senior career*
Years	Team	Apps	(Gls)
2003–2008	Wohaib		
2008–2010	Khan Research Laboratories	66	(?)
2010–2014	WAPDA	88	(?)
2014–2015	Isa Town	?	(?)
2015–2017	Khan Research Laboratories	32	(?)
2017–2021	WAPDA		

International career
2010–2014	Pakistan U23		
2008–2015	Pakistan	23	(0)
Medal record
Khan Research Laboratories
Winner	Pakistan Premier League	2009
Winner	Challenge Cup	2009
Water & Power Development Authority
Winner	Pakistan Premier League	2010
- * Club domestic league appearances and goals

Muhammad Ahmed Islam (Urdu: محمد أحمد; born 3 January 1988) is a Pakistani former professional footballer who played as a centre back.

== Club career ==
=== Wohaib ===
Ahmed played for Lahore club Wohaib in his youth until making his senior debut in 2003. In 2004, Ahmed featured in the National Youth Football Championship. He also featured in the inaugural 2004 Pakistan Premier League with the club.

=== Khan Research Laboratories ===
Ahmed subsequently moved to departmental side Khan Research Laboratories, winning the 2009–10 Pakistan Premier League and the 2009 National Football Challenge Cup.

=== WAPDA ===
Ahmed moved to WAPDA in 2010, where he won the 2010–11 Pakistan Premier League. He scored a hat-trick, in a 4–0 win against Baloch Nushki, in the 2013–14 Pakistan Premier League.

=== Isa Town ===
In 2014, Ahmed joined Bahrain second division club Isa Town on a one-year deal.

=== Return to Khan Research Laboratories ===
Ahmed returned to Khan Research Laboratories in 2015. His goal in the final of the 2016 Pakistan Football Federation Cup against National Bank helped the club retain their title.

=== Return to WAPDA ===
Ahmed returned to WAPDA in 2017. He was dropped from the squad in 2021 in order to rebuild the team.

== International career ==
Son of Sports Secretary Muhammad Islam, Ahmed captained the Pakistan under-14 team in AFC U-14 Festival of Football at Kathmandu in 2004, and AFC U-17 Football Championship 2005 at Jawaharlal Nehru Stadium, New Delhi. He also represented the Pakistan under-20 football team at Tajikistan in 2005. In 2007, he was included in the national camp for the selection of the Pakistan under-23 team for the 2008 Summer Olympics qualifiers.

Ahmed made his senior international debut for Pakistan with a 9–2 victory against Guam in the 2008 AFC Challenge Cup qualification. He played in a friendly against Malaysia the same year, ending in a 1–4 defeat. In 2010, he represented the Pakistan under-23 team in the 2010 Asian Games.

In 2011, after making an appearance in the 2014 FIFA World Cup qualification against Bangladesh, he participated in the 2011 SAFF Championship. He was called again by the senior team in February 2013, making two appearances in both two-match friendlies against Nepal, both ending in a 1–0 victory for Pakistan. He them played in one of the two-match tour against Maldives in the same month. In March 2013, he participated in the 2014 AFC Challenge Cup qualification, playing against Tajikistan, Kyrgyzstan and Macau. After a friendly against Afghanistan in 2013, he was subsequently called for the 2013 SAFF Championship.

Ahmed was called for the 2014 Asian Games, where he started in the opening game against North Korea. The same year he also captained the senior team during a friendly against Palestine.

He played his last international game against Yemen in the 2018 FIFA World Cup qualifiers, where he fell injured at the 38th minutes of the games.

== Career statistics ==
=== International ===
Appearances and goals by national team and year
National team	Year	Apps	Goals
Pakistan	2008	2	0
Pakistan	2011	4	0
Pakistan	2012	1	0
Pakistan	2013	11	0
Pakistan	2014	3	0
Pakistan	2015	2	0
Total		23	0
