= Muzammil Hussain =

Pakistani footballer (born 1993)

Personal information
- Full name: Muzammil Hussain
- Date of birth: 6 September 1993 (age 33)
- Place of birth: Rawalpindi, Pakistan
- Position: Goalkeeper

Team information
- Current team: WAPDA
- Number: 24

Senior career*
Years	Team	Apps	(Gls)
2009–	WAPDA		

International career^{‡}
2014–2015	Pakistan U23		
2013–2015	Pakistan	5	(0)
- * Club domestic league appearances and goals as of 28 August 2023 (UTC) ‡ National team caps and goals as of 00:00, 27 June 2016 (UTC)

Muzammil Hussain (born 6 September 1993) is a Pakistani footballer who plays as a goalkeeper for WAPDA.

== Club career ==
Hussain made his debut with WAPDA in the 2009–10 season of the Pakistan Premier League. The next season, he won the 2010–11 Pakistan Premier League title. He was declared goalkeeper of the year consecutively in the 2013–14, and 2014–15 Pakistan Premier League seasons.

== International career ==
Muzammil was first called up in 2011 for the Pakistan national under-23 team's 2012 Olympics qualifiers against Malaysia, but missed the event due to injury. He played for the under-team 23 in a friendly series in August 2014 against India, the first match ending in a 0–1 loss and the second in a 2–0 win for Pakistan. He also played in 1–2 loss in a friendly against Malaysia in 2015.

He made his senior debut for the Pakistan national football team in 2013, in a friendly against Afghanistan which ended in a 3–0 loss. He started the game against Yemen in the 2018 FIFA World Cup qualifiers. The first match ended in a 1–3 loss, after he saved the first shot in a penalty in the starting minutes of the game, until Abdulwasea Al Matari finally headed the ball in the net. He received an injury in the second leg which ended in a 0–0 draw, where he was replaced by Saqib Hanif in the second half of the game.

== Career statistics ==
=== International ===
As of 28 June 2016

Appearances and goals by national team and year
National team	Year	Apps	Goals
Pakistan	2013	1	0
Pakistan	2014	1	0
Pakistan	2015	3	0
Total		5	0

== Honours ==
=== Club ===
National Bank

- Pakistan Premier League: 2009–10

=== Individual ===
- Goalkeeper of the year: 2013–14, 2014–15
