= Municipal Football Stadium, Rawalpindi =

Football stadium in Karachi, Pakistan

Municipal Football Stadium
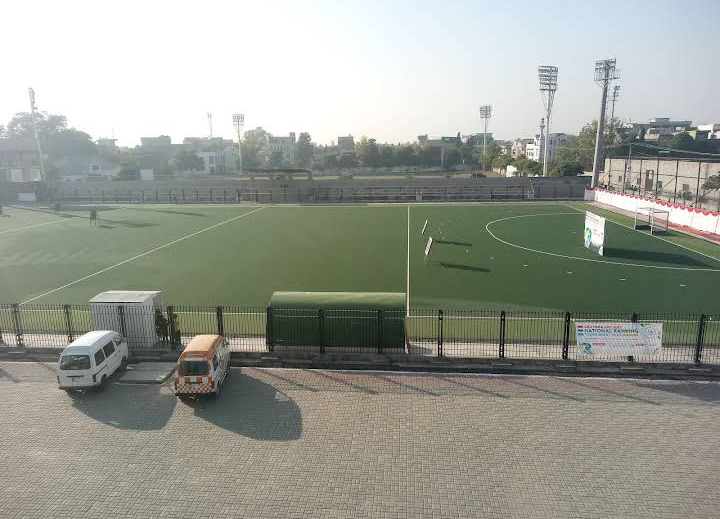
- Interactive map of Municipal Football Stadium
- Location: Rawalpindi, Pakistan
- Coordinates: 33.632256°N 73.064323°E
- Surface: Grass

Municipal Football Stadium is an association football stadium in Rawalpindi, Pakistan. It has hosted top-flight Pakistan Premier League fixtures.

== History ==
In 1978, the stadium hosted the final of the National Football Championship, between Pakistan Airlines and Sindh Red.

Since the 2000s, the stadium has hosted top-flight Pakistan Premier League fixtures. It also hosted the 2023–24 National Football Challenge Cup first phase.

In 2024, the stadium wad upgraded, as part of provincial and city efforts to improve youth facilities.

== See also ==
- List of football stadiums in Pakistan
