= Abdul Rehman (footballer) =

Pakistani footballer

Personal information
- Full name: Abdul Rehman
- Date of birth: 7 August 1982 (age 44)
- Place of birth: Karachi, Pakistan
- Positions: Striker; winger

Senior career*
Years	Team	Apps	(Gls)
2006–2009	Karachi Port Trust	66	(28)
2009–2019	K-Electric	42	(11)

International career
2008–2014	Pakistan	2	(1)
- * Club domestic league appearances and goals

Abdul Rehman (born 7 August 1982) is a Pakistani former footballer who played as a forward.

== Club career ==
=== Karachi Port Trust ===
Rehman started his career at departmental side Karachi Port Trust in 2006. In his last campaign with the club, He was the fourth top scorer of the 2008–09 Pakistan Premier League with 14 goals.

=== KESC ===
In 2009, Rehman moved to KESC, later rebranded as K-Electric. He finished as third top scorer of the 2009–10 and 2010–11 Pakistan Premier League, with 10 and 13 goals respectively. He won the maiden 2014-15 Pakistan Premier League title with the club.

== International career ==
Rehman made an appearance for the Pakistan national football team in the qualifying round of the 2008 AFC Challenge Cup against Guam on 6 April 2008, coming on as a 46th-minute substitute for Adnan Ahmed and scoring the ninth goal for Pakistan on 85th minute.

He was called once again in 2014 under Mohammad Al-Shamlan, in a friendly against Palestine.

== Personal life ==
Rehman hailed from the locality of Lyari in Karachi.

== Career statistics ==
=== International ===
Appearances and goals by national team and year
National team	Year	Apps	Goals
Pakistan	2008	1	1
Pakistan	2014	1	0
Total		2	1

Scores and results list Pakistan's goal tally first, score column indicates score after each Rehman goal.

List of international goals scored by Abdul Rehman
No.	Date	Venue	Opponent	Score	Result	Competition
1	6 April 2008	Chungshan Stadium, Taipei, Taiwan	Guam	9–2	9–2	2008 AFC Challenge Cup qualification

== Honours ==
=== Club ===
K-Electric

- Pakistan Premier League: 2014–15
