= Imran Hussain (footballer) =

Pakistani association football striker (born 1981)

Personal information
- Full name: Imran Hussain
- Date of birth: March 10, 1981 (age 45)
- Place of birth: Faisalabad, Pakistan
- Position: Striker

Senior career*
Years	Team	Apps	(Gls)
2002–2013	Pakistan Army	143	(83)

International career
2005–2006	Pakistan	11	(1)
- * Club domestic league appearances and goals

Imran Hussain (Urdu: عمران حسین; born on March 10, 1981) is a Pakistani former footballer who played as a striker. He played for Pakistan Army F.C. throughout his career, and made his international debut in 2005 against India. Hussain won the golden boot in 2005–06 Pakistan Premier League season, scoring 21 goals in 22 games.

== Club career ==
Hussain played for Pakistan Army throughout his career, starting his career in 2002. He scored 4 goals in a match in his first season at the 2002 President PFF Cup. In 2004, Hussain featured in the National Youth Football Championship. In the inaugural 2004–05 Pakistan Premier League, Hussain finished as second top-scorer behind Arif Mehmood with 19 goals, as Army finished runner-up of the league.

He is a two-time Pakistan Premier League winner, winning the title first in 2005–06 and again in 2006–07. Hussain won the golden boot in the 2005–06 season, scoring 21 goals in 22 games. In the next season he finished as the second highest scorer, behind Arif Mehmood, with 8 goals. He also participated in the AFC President's Cup with the club.

=== Controversy ===
In the 2011–12 Pakistan Premier League, a match between Pakistan Army and Afghan FC Chaman on 26 July 2011 at Sadiq Shaheed Stadium in Quetta was marred by violence started by Hussain towards the match official. Afghan Chaman was leading 2–1 by the 75th minute when Hussain disputed a referee decision on a freekick, leading to his dismissal after a heated argument. Imran's attack on the referee sparked further chaos, with another Army player, Shakeel Ahmed, also getting physical and subsequently sent off. The match ended 2–1 in favor of Afghan Chaman, with Pakistan Army playing the final 15 minutes with only 9 men due to the dismissals.

== International career ==
Hussain made his debut with Pakistan on 12 June 2005 which was the first game in a series of three games against India, the game finished 1–1 draw to Pakistan. He was subsequently called for the 2005 SAFF Championship, where he scored his first goal against Sri Lanka in a 1–0 victory for Pakistan.

== Career statistics ==
=== International ===
Appearances and goals by national team and year
National team	Year	Apps	Goals
Pakistan	2005	7	1
Pakistan	2006	4	0
Total		11	1

Scores and results list Pakistan's goal tally first, score column indicates score after each Hussain goal.

List of international goals scored by Imran Hussain
No.	Date	Venue	Opponent	Score	Result	Competition
1	7 December 2005	People's Football Stadium, Karachi, Pakistan	Sri Lanka	1–0	1–0	2005 South Asian Football Federation Gold Cup
