= Model Town C-Block Ground =

- Location: Model Town, Lahore, Pakistan
- Owner: Pakistan Football Federation
- Capacity: 3,000
- Surface: Grass

Model Town C-Block Ground is a football stadium in the C Block of Model Town neighbourhood of Lahore, Pakistan.

== Usage ==
The Pakistan national football team has held multiple training camps at the ground. The stadium also served as home venue for WAPDA at the 2006–07 Pakistan Premier League.

Some reports referred to the site as the Model Town D-Block ground when covering Pakistan national team training camps. Other coverage has described the venue as the Model Town Football Academy Ground, Model Town C & D Block.
