= Nasrullah Khan (footballer) =

Pakistani footballer

Personal information
- Full name: Nasrullah Khan
- Date of birth: March 1, 1985 (age 41)
- Place of birth: Quetta, Pakistan
- Position: Midfielder

Senior career*
Years	Team	Apps	(Gls)
2003–2006	PTCL		
2006–2007	Afghan Chaman		
2007–2018	Pakistan Airlines		

International career
2006	Pakistan U23		
2008–2009	Pakistan	6	(0)
Medal record
Representing Pakistan
Winner	South Asian Games	2006
- * Club domestic league appearances and goals

Nasrullah Khan (born 1 March 1985) is a Pakistani former footballer who played as a midfielder for the national team.

== Club career ==
Khan started his career in 2003 at the departmental side PTCL, and moved to Afghan Chaman in 2006. After a year, he moved to PIA where he also captained the team. He was declared Best Player of the Season at the 2009–10 Pakistan Premier League.

== International career ==
Khan was first called up to the Pakistan under 23 national team for the 2006 South Asian Games held in Colombo, where he helped Pakistan win the gold medal.

He represented Pakistan at senior level from 2008 to 2009, earning his first cap against the Maldives in the 2008 SAFF Championship. He subsequently played in a friendly against Malaysia, finishing in a 1–4 defeat. In 2009, he played at the 2010 AFC Challenge Cup qualification in a 6–0 victory against Brunei at Sri Lanka. In March 2009, he played at the 2009 ANFA Cup. After a friendly against Thailand in July 2009, he participated at the 2009 SAFF Championship.

== Career statistics ==
=== International ===
Appearances and goals by year and competition
National team	Year	Apps	Goals
Pakistan	2008	4	0
Pakistan	2009	2	0
Total		6	0

== Honours ==
=== Pakistan U-23 ===
- South Asian Games: 2006
