= 2005 Pakistan Premier League =

Pakistan Premier League
- Season: 2005
- Dates: 31 July 2005 – 23 October 2005
- Champions: Pakistan Army; 1st Premier League title 3rd Pakistani title
- Relegated: Panther Club; Pakistan Public Work Department
- AFC President's Cup: Pakistan Army
- Matches: 264
- Goals: 346 (1.31 per match)
- Top goalscorer: Imran Hussain (21 goals)
- Biggest home win: Pakistan Army 10–0 Wohaib (12 October 2005)
- Biggest away win: Pakistan Navy 0–5 National Bank (5 October 2005)
- Highest scoring: Karachi Port Trust 6–4 Panther Club (21 August 2005); Pakistan Army 10–0 Wohaib (12 October 2005)
- Longest winning run: 8 games Pakistan Army
- Longest unbeaten run: 14 games Pakistan Army
- Longest winless run: 13 games Pakistan Public Work Department
- Longest losing run: 6 games Pakistan Public Work Department

The 2005 Pakistan Premier League season was the 2nd season of Pakistan Premier League and 51st season of Pakistan domestic football. The season started on 31 July 2005 and concluded on 23 October 2005.

== Overview ==
After the formation of the newly introduced National A Division Football League in 2004, the second 2005 season was renamed as Pakistan Premier League. After completion of the first season of top tier, PFF launched the second tier PFF League, and the second season of the Pakistan Premier League featured the promoted teams National Bank and Pakistan Public Works Department.

WAPDA were the defending champions, having won their 1st Pakistan Premier League and 5th Pakistani title the previous season.

Pakistan Army won the title on 19 October 2005, after defeating PTCL 2-0, with 54th and 70th minute goals from Mubassar and Jaffar Hussain. Army had one game to play against WAPDA who were three points away from first position. Army won the league regardless of their result against WAPDA due to superior goal difference. Army won the tie against WAPDA 3-1, with a brace from the league's top scorer Imran Hussain. Army ended up winning the league by six points.

Panther Club and Pakistan Public Work Department were relegated at the end of the season and will be replaced by Karachi Electric Supply Corporation and Pakistan Railways in the coming season.

== Venues ==
The 2005 Pakistan Premier League was not played as strict home-and-away. Matches were staged in city hubs, notably Karachi (KMC Stadium, Aga Khan Gymkhana), Rawalpindi (Army Stadium, Municipal Stadium), Islamabad, (Jinnah Stadium), Lahore (Model Town Ground, Punjab University Old Campus Ground), and Chaman (Government High School Ground). Several clubs hosted "home" fixtures at these shared venues.

== Teams ==
Allied Bank, Baloch Nushki, Mardan, Mauripur Baloch, Naka Mohammaden and Young Eleven FC were relegated at the end of 2004-05 season and were replaced by National Bank and Pakistan Public Work Department.

Club	City
Afghan Chaman	Chaman
Habib Bank	Karachi
Karachi Port Trust	Karachi
Khan Research Laboratories	Rawalpindi
National Bank	Karachi
PTCL	Islamabad
Pakistan Army	Rawalpindi
Pakistan Navy	Rawalpindi
Pakistan Public Work Department	Karachi
Panther Club	Faisalabad
WAPDA	Lahore
Wohaib	Lahore

== League table ==
Pos	Team	Pld	W	D	L	GF	GA	GD	Pts	Qualification or relegation
1	Pakistan Army	22	16	3	3	52	9	+43	51	Qualification to 2006 AFC President's Cup
2	WAPDA	22	13	6	3	43	15	+28	45	
3	Khan Research Laboratories	22	12	5	5	41	24	+17	41	
4	Afghan Chaman	22	11	4	7	25	27	−2	37	
5	PTCL	22	11	3	8	36	26	+10	36	
6	National Bank	22	9	8	5	31	19	+12	35	
7	Habib Bank	22	7	5	10	24	26	−2	26	
8	Karachi Port Trust	22	6	6	10	27	35	−8	24	
9	Pakistan Navy	22	5	6	11	17	26	−9	21	
10	Wohaib	22	5	5	12	16	41	−25	20	
11	Panther Club	22	6	2	14	20	44	−24	20	Relegation to 2006 PFF National League
12	Pakistan Public Work Department	22	3	3	16	14	44	−30	12	Relegation to 2006 PFF National League

Source: RSSSF
Rules for classification: 1) points; 2) goal difference; 3) number of goals scored.

=== Champions ===
2005 Pakistan Premier League champions

First title

== Statistics ==
=== Scoring ===
- First goal of the season: Muhammad Essa for Afghan Chaman against Pakistan Public Work Department (31 July 2005).
- Last goal of the season: Khuda Bakhsh for WAPDA against Pakistan Army (23 October 2005).
- Fastest goal of the season: 52 seconds – Farooq Shah for National Bank against Pakistan Navy (14 January 2013).
- Largest winning margin: 10 goals
  - Pakistan Army 10–0 Wohaib (12 October 2005).
- Highest scoring game: 10 goals.
  - Karachi Port Trust 6–4 Panther (21 August 2005).
  - Pakistan Army 10–0 Wohaib (12 October 2005).
- Most goals scored in a match by a losing team: 4 goals
  - Karachi Port Trust 6–4 Panther (21 August 2005).

=== Top scorers ===
As of 17 January 2006

Rank	Scorer	Club	Goals
1	Imran Hussain	Pakistan Army	21
2	Qadeer Ahmed	Khan Research Laboratories	16
3	Muhammad Essa	Afghan Chaman	12
3	Jaffar Hussain	Pakistan Army	12
3	Arif Mehmood	WAPDA	12
6	Mohammad Ejaz	PTCL	10
7	Adeel Ahmed	PTCL	8
7	Nomi Martin Gill	Pakistan Navy	8
7	Sattar Mansuri	National Bank	8
10	Asif Nawaz	Panther Club	7
10	Farooq Shah	National Bank	7

=== Hat-tricks ===
As of 17 January 2006

Player	For	Against	Result	Date	Ref.
Muhammad Essa	Afghan Chaman	Pakistan Public Work Department	3–2	31 July 2005	
Sattar Mansuri	National Bank	Karachi Port Trust	3–2	5 September 2005	
Imran Hussain	Pakistan Army	Afghan Chaman	4–0	21 September 2005	
Adeel Ahmed	PTCL	Afghan Chaman	6–2	24 September 2011	
