= 2014–15 Pakistan Premier League =

- Dates: 22 October 2014 – 21 January 2015
- Champions: K-Electric F.C. 1st Premier League title 1st Pakistani title
- Relegated: Pakistan Railways; Baloch Quetta
- AFC Cup: K-Electric
- Matches: 132
- Goals: 308 (2.33 per match)
- Top goalscorer: Muhammad Rasool (22)
- Biggest home win: WAPDA 6–0 Baloch Quetta (27 October 2014)
- Biggest away win: Baloch Quetta 0–9 Pakistan Air Force (18 November 2014)
- Highest scoring: Baloch Quetta 0–9 Pakistan Air Force (18 November 2014)
- Longest winning run: 9 games K-Electric
- Longest unbeaten run: 9 games K-Electric
- Longest winless run: 18 games Baloch Quetta
- Longest losing run: 8 games Baloch Quetta

The 2014–15 Pakistan Premier League was the 60th season of Pakistan domestic football and the 11th season of the Pakistan Premier League, the top tier of the Pakistan football league system. The league began on 20 September 2014. Khan Research Laboratories were the defending champions, having won the league championship for the last three seasons.

The season saw the league reduced to 12 teams from 16 after six sides were relegated and two promoted in the previous season.

== Venues ==
The entire 2014–15 Pakistan Premier League was staged at centralized venues rather than traditional club home grounds. Matches were played in Karachi (KPT Stadium, KMC Stadium, Korangi Baloch Stadium, Dr Mohammad Ali Shah Stadium), Islamabad (Jinnah Stadium) and Lahore (Faisal Town Football Ground, Railway Stadium).

== Teams ==
Locations of teams in the 2014-15 PPLPakistan Navy, HBL, Baloch Nushki, Pak Afghan Clearing, ZTBL and Lyallpur were relegated at the end of the 2013–14 campaign. They were replaced by Baloch Quetta and Pakistan Railways.

Club	City
Afghan Chaman	Chaman
Baloch Quetta	Quetta
K-Electric	Karachi
Karachi Port Trust	Karachi
Khan Research Laboratories	Rawalpindi
Muslim	Quetta
National Bank	Karachi
Pakistan Air Force	Peshawar
Pakistan Army	Rawalpindi
Pakistan Railways	Lahore
Pakistan Airlines	Karachi
WAPDA	Lahore

== Final standings ==
Pos	Team	Pld	W	D	L	GF	GA	GD	Pts	Qualification or relegation
1	K-Electric (C)	22	15	3	4	43	20	+23	48	Qualification to AFC Cup qualifying round
2	Pakistan Army	22	13	6	3	30	7	+23	45	
3	Pakistan Air Force	22	12	6	4	38	14	+24	42	
4	Pakistan Airlines	22	11	5	6	28	18	+10	38	
5	WAPDA	22	10	6	6	31	14	+17	36	
6	Khan Research Laboratories	22	8	7	7	19	16	+3	31	
7	National Bank	22	8	6	8	21	17	+4	30	
8	Karachi Port Trust	22	9	2	11	29	28	+1	29	
9	Muslim	22	8	5	9	26	26	0	29	
10	Afghan Chaman	22	6	5	11	24	29	−5	23	
11	Pakistan Railways (R)	22	1	7	14	13	25	−12	10	Relegation
12	Baloch Quetta (R)	22	0	4	18	6	64	−58	4	Relegation

Source: SoccerWay
(C) Champions; (R) Relegated

== Results ==
Home \ Away	AFG	BAL	KE	KPT	KRL	MUS	NBP	PAF	PAR	PIA	PRL	WAP
Afghan Chaman	—	6–1	0–2	0–2	1–0	1–0	0–1	0–1	0–3	3–0	3–0	0–2
Baloch Quetta	1–5	—	0–4	0–2	0–0	2–2	0–2	0–9	0–3	0–4	0–1	0–2
K-Electric	2–0	3–2	—	3–2	1–1	1–0	1–0	0–1	2–0	1–2	1–0	1–0
Karachi Port Trust	1–3	5–1	2–1	—	0–1	1–2	0–4	1–3	0–2	0–2	3–2	0–5
Khan Research Laboratories	2–0	2–0	2–3	0–1	—	1–1	1–1	1–2	0–0	2–1	2–1	2–0
Muslim	1–0	1–0	1–5	4–1	0–0	—	1–1	3–0	0–1	1–2	2–2	1–0
National Bank	2–1	0–0	0–2	0–2	1–0	0–2	—	0–0	0–3	1–2	3–0	0–0
Pakistan Airforce	4–0	3–0	1–1	2–3	2–0	2–1	1–0	—	0–1	0–2	4–0	0–0
Pakistan Army	0–0	0–0	1–1	2–0	0–1	1–0	2–1	0–0	—	0–0	6–0	1–0
Pakistan Airlines	0–0	2–0	0–2	2–0	0–0	1–0	1–2	0–0	0–1	—	3–0	3–0
Pakistan Railways	1–1	1–1	2–5	2–0	0–1	1–1	1–2	0–2	1–3	0–1	—	0–2
WAPDA	1–1	6–0	3–1	2–0	1–0	3–1	1–2	4–0	1–0	0–1	0–2	—

Source: Soccer 24
Legend: Blue = home team win; Yellow = draw; Red = away team win.

== Season statistics ==
=== Scoring ===
- Fastest goal in a match: 50 seconds – Zahid Majeed for Pakistan Airlines against K-Electric (30 September 2014)
- First hat-trick of the season: Muhammad Asif for National Bank against Karachi Port Trust (30 September 2014)
- Widest winning margin: 5 goals – Afghan Chaman 6–1 Baloch Quetta (2 November 2014)
- Team with most goals scored: 43 goals – K-Electric
- Team with fewest goals scored: 6 goals – Baloch Quetta
- Team with fewest goals conceded: 7 goals – Pakistan Army
- Team with most goals conceded: 64 goals – Baloch Quetta

==== Top scorers ====
Rank	Scorer	Club	Goals
1	Muhammad Rasool	K-Electric	22
2	Muhammad Mujahid	Pakistan Air Force	12
2	Muhammad Asif	National Bank	12
4	Mansoor Khan	Pakistan Air Force	11
5	Muhammad Sarfaraz	Pakistan Army	9
6	Zeeshan Ali	Pakistan Airlines	8
6	Arif Mehmood	WAPDA	8
6	Muhammad Hanif	Muslim	8
6	Abayomi Oludeyi	K-Electric	8

==== Hat-tricks ====
Player	For	Against	Result	Date	Ref
Muhammad Hanif	Muslim	Baloch Quetta	3–0	21 September 2014	
Muhammad Asif ^{4}	Karachi Port Trust	National Bank	4–0	30 September 2014	
Arif Mehmood	WAPDA	Baloch Quetta	6–0	27 October 2014	
Jadeed Khan	Afghan Chaman	Baloch Quetta	6–1	2 November 2014	
Muhammad Rasool	K-Electric	Pakistan Railways	5–2	20 November 2014	
Muhammad Rasool	K-Electric	Muslim	5–1	18 December 2014	
Muhammad Mujahid ^{4}	Pakistan Airforce	Baloch Quetta	9–0	20 December 2014	
Mansoor Khan	Pakistan Airforce	Baloch Quetta	9–0	20 December 2014	

^{4} Player scored four goals
Note: Baloch Quetta played with only 7 players on 2 November 2014 against Afghan Chaman, as most of the players returned home after losing several family members in 2014 Quetta Airbase attack, Pakistan Football Federation did not rescheduled the match, which earned them the negative criticism. Baloch Quetta lost the match 6–1.

== Awards ==
Following is the list of annual award winners.

Award	Player	Club
Top scorer	Muhammad Rasool	K-Electric
Best goalkeeper	Muzammil Hussain	WAPDA
Best Player of the Season (shared)	Mansoor Khan; Muhammad Mujahid	Pakistan Airforce
