= KRL Football Stadium =

Football ground in Rawalpindi, Pakistan

- Location: Rawalpindi, Punjab, Pakistan
- Owner: Khan Research Laboratories

Tenant
- KRL FC

KRL Football Stadium is a football stadium in Rawalpindi, Punjab, Pakistan. It is the home ground of departmental club KRL FC, the football team of Khan Research Laboratories. The venue is distinct from the KRL cricket stadium, now known as Shoaib Akhtar Cricket Stadium.

The stadium has also been used as training ground by the Pakistan national football team.

== History ==
The ground has been used for Pakistan's national club competitions. In 2006, fixtures in the 2006 PFF League were assigned to KRL Stadium. It was selected as KRL's home ground for the 2008 Pakistan Premier League. The following 2009 Pakistan Premier League season it was allocated all 13 of KRL's league home matches.

The KRL football team continued to use the venue during its period of success in the early 2010s.

It later staged Group F matches in the 2023–24 National Challenge Cup.

== See also ==
- KRL FC
- Shoaib Akhtar Cricket Stadium
- List of football stadiums in Pakistan
