= 2006–07 Pakistan Premier League =

Pakistan Premier League
- Season: 2006–07
- Champions: Pakistan Army; 2nd Premier League title 4th Pakistani title
- Relegated: Habib Bank; Pakistan Telecommunication
- AFC President's Cup: Pakistan Army
- Matches: 180
- Goals: 244 (1.36 per match)
- Top goalscorer: Arif Mehmood (14 goals)
- Biggest home win: WAPDA 6–0 Karachi Port Trust (12 September 2006); WAPDA 6–0 National Bank (14 September 2006)
- Biggest away win: Wohaib 0–6 Karachi Port Trust (14 September 2006)
- Highest scoring: WAPDA 6–0 Karachi Port Trust (12 September 2006); WAPDA 6–0 National Bank (14 September 2006); Wohaib 0–6 Karachi Port Trust (14 September 2006); Karachi Port Trust 4–2 Wohaib (13 January 2007); Karachi Electric Supply Corporation 2–4 WAPDA (25 January 2007)
- Longest winning run: 7 games Pakistan Army
- Longest unbeaten run: 19 games Pakistan Army
- Longest winless run: 11 games Habib Bank
- Longest losing run: 7 games Wohaib

The 2006–07 Pakistan Premier League season was the 3rd season of Pakistan Premier League and 52nd season of Pakistan domestic football. The football season was moved from the summer to the winter months.

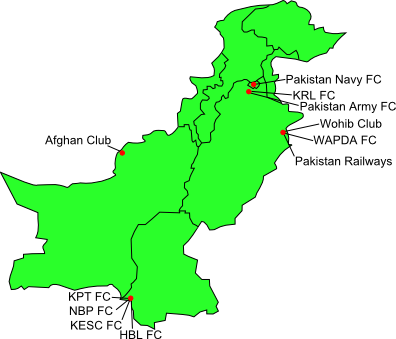
Teams in PPL 2006/07

The defending champions Pakistan Army ended the season as league champions, winning their second title in three years.

Pakistan Army goalkeeper Jaffar Khan set a new Pakistani record by keeping a clean sheet for 1,260 minutes. Pakistan Army only conceded 3 goals, another record.

By virtue of being the national champions, Pakistan Army represented Pakistan at the 2007 AFC President's Cup, which was staged in Lahore.

The relegation spots were occupied by Habib Bank and Pakistan Telecommunication, who withdrew before the start of the league.

== Teams ==
Panther Club and Pakistan Public Work Department were relegated at the end of the 2005–06 season and were replaced by B-Division winners and runner-up Pakistan Railways and Karachi Electric Supply Corporation.

| Club | City | Stadium |
|---|---|---|
| Afghan Chaman | Chaman | None |
| Habib Bank | Karachi | None |
| Karachi Electric Supply Corporation | Karachi | None |
| Karachi Port Trust | Karachi | Karachi Port Trust Stadium |
| Khan Research Laboratories | Rawalpindi | KRL Football Stadium |
| National Bank | Karachi | None |
| Pakistan Telecommunication | Islamabad | None |
| Pakistan Army | Rawalpindi | Army Stadium |
| Pakistan Navy | Rawalpindi | None |
| Pakistan Railways | Lahore | Railway Stadium |
| WAPDA | Lahore | Model Town C-Block Ground |
| Wohaib | Lahore | Punjab University Old Campus Ground |

== League table ==
| Pos | Team | Pld | W | D | L | GF | GA | GD | Pts | Qualification or relegation |
|---|---|---|---|---|---|---|---|---|---|---|
| 1 | Pakistan Army | 20 | 15 | 4 | 1 | 27 | 3 | +24 | 49 | 2007 AFC President's Cup |
| 2 | WAPDA | 20 | 13 | 5 | 2 | 41 | 10 | +31 | 44 | |
| 3 | Khan Research Laboratories | 20 | 13 | 5 | 2 | 26 | 12 | +14 | 44 | |
| 4 | Karachi Port Trust | 20 | 7 | 7 | 6 | 28 | 29 | −1 | 28 | |
| 5 | National Bank | 20 | 7 | 6 | 7 | 24 | 28 | −4 | 27 | |
| 6 | Karachi Electric Supply Corporation | 20 | 6 | 6 | 8 | 23 | 25 | −2 | 24 | |
| 7 | Pakistan Navy | 20 | 6 | 5 | 9 | 19 | 21 | −2 | 23 | |
| 8 | Pakistan Railways | 20 | 4 | 7 | 9 | 18 | 32 | −14 | 19 | |
| 9 | Afghan Chaman | 20 | 4 | 5 | 11 | 17 | 27 | −10 | 17 | |
| 10 | Wohaib | 20 | 3 | 4 | 13 | 10 | 33 | −23 | 13 | |
| 11 | Habib Bank (R) | 20 | 2 | 6 | 12 | 11 | 24 | −13 | 12 | Relegation to 2007–08 PFF League |
| 12 | Pakistan Telecommunication (R) | 0 | 0 | 0 | 0 | 0 | 0 | 0 | 0 | Relegation to 2007–08 PFF League |

Updated to match(es) played on 1 February 2007. Source: RSSSF
Rules for classification: 1) points; 2) goal difference; 3) number of goals scored.
(R) Relegated

== Statistics ==
=== Scoring ===
- First goal of the season: Siraj-ud-Din for Afghan Chaman against Wohaib (10 September 2006).
- Last goal of the season: Muhammad Ali for Afghan Chaman against Pakistan Navy(1 February 2007).
- Fastest goal of the season: 2 minutes
  - Shakir Lashari for Karachi Electric Supply Corporation against National Bank (25 December 2006).
  - Nasir Hussain for Pakistan Navy against Karachi Electric Supply Corporation (29 December 2006).
- Largest winning margin: 6 goals
  - WAPDA 6–0 Karachi Port Trust (12 September 2006).
  - WAPDA 6–0 National Bank (14 September 2006).
  - Wohaib 0–6 Karachi Port Trust (14 September 2006).
- Highest scoring game: 6 goals
  - WAPDA 6–0 Karachi Port Trust (12 September 2006).
  - WAPDA 6–0 National Bank (14 September 2006).
  - Wohaib 0–6 Karachi Port Trust (14 September 2006).
  - Karachi Port Trust 4–2 Wohaib (13 January 2007).
  - Karachi Electric Supply Corporation 2–4 WAPDA (25 January 2007).
- Most goals scored in a match by a single team: 6 goals
  - WAPDA 6–0 Karachi Port Trust (12 September 2006).
  - WAPDA 6–0 National Bank (14 September 2006).
  - Wohaib 0–6 Karachi Port Trust (14 September 2006).
- Most goals scored in a match by a losing team: 2 goals
  - Karachi Port Trust 3–2 Pakistan Navy (24 December 2006).
  - Karachi Port Trust 4–2 Wohaib (13 January 2007).
  - Pakistan Navy 2–3 Khan Research Laboratories (15 January 2007).
  - Karachi Electric Supply Corporation 2–4 WAPDA (25 January 2007).

=== Top scorers ===
| Rank | Player | Club | Goals |
|---|---|---|---|
| 1 | Arif Mehmood | WAPDA | 14 |
| 2 | Imran Hussain | Pakistan Army | 8 |
| 3 | Muhammad Ali | Afghan Chaman | 7 |
| 4 | Moosa Lal | WAPDA | 4 |
| 4 | Zahid Hameed | WAPDA | 4 |

=== Hat-tricks ===
| Player | For | Against | Result | Date | Ref. |
|---|---|---|---|---|---|
| Arif Mehmood | WAPDA | Karachi Port Trust | 6–0 | 12 September 2006 | |
| Bashir | WAPDA | National Bank | 6–0 | 14 September 2006 | |
| Naseer Ahmed | Karachi Port Trust | Wohaib | 4–2 | 13 January 2007 | |
| Arif Mehmood | WAPDA | Karachi Electric Supply Corporation | 4–2 | 26 January 2007 | |
