= Arif Mehmood =

Pakistani footballer (born 1983)

Personal information
- Date of birth: 21 June 1983 (age 43)
- Place of birth: Multan, Pakistan
- Height: 1.68 m (5 ft 6 in)
- Position: Forward

Youth career
- 1998–2001: WAPDA

Senior career*
Years	Team	Apps	(Gls)
2001–2015	WAPDA	283	(188)
Total		283	(188)

International career
2002–2004	Pakistan U23		
2003–2012	Pakistan	21	(7)
Medal record
Representing Pakistan
Winner	South Asian Games	2004
- * Club domestic league appearances and goals

Arif Mehmood (born 21 June 1983) is a Pakistani former footballer who played as a striker. He has been the top-scorer in the Pakistan Premier League five times, leading the charts in 2004, 2006–07, 2007–08, 2009–10 and 2010–11.

== Early life ==
Mehmood was born on 21 June 1983 in Multan in the Punjab province of Pakistan. He completed his studies from Government Comprehensive Boys High School and graduated in engineering from Government Technology College.

== Club career ==
Mehmood started his career with the amateur team Young Gulshan Multan, from where WAPDA scouted him and selected him in their youth team in 1998.

In the inaugural 2004 National A Division Football League, Mehmood scored 20 goals in 30 appearances, earning the top-scorer award. WAPDA won their first Premier League title and fifth league title, Mehmood contributing substantially to the title win. WAPDA qualified for the 2005 AFC President's Cup after winning the league. They were placed in Group B, with Blue Star, Dordoi Bishkek and Phnom Penh Crown. Mehmood scored two goals in three appearances, which included the only goal of the match against Dordoi Bishkek.

In 2005 Pakistan Premier League season WAPDA finished Army FC, and repeating the same feat in 2006–07 Pakistan Premier League, although this time Mehmood finished as top scorer after scoring 19 goals in 20 appearances.

Mehmood played with Lahore Lajpaals in the inaugural franchise based 2007 Super Football League, ending as top scorer with 8 goals. Mehmood won the league for a second time in 2008 Pakistan Premier League after beating Army in the last day of the season and winning the league by 1 point. Mehmood was again the top scorer, scoring 21 goals in 26 games. WAPDA qualified for 2008 AFC President's Cup where they finished bottom of the group.

Mehmood got his hands on more silverware after winning the league again in 2008 Pakistan Premier League season. In this process they qualified for 2009 AFC President's Cup. Mehmood scored a brace against Taiwan Power Company, WAPDA won the game 1–3, finishing second in the group. WAPDA once again faced their group Regar-TadAZ in the semi-finals, WAPDA lost the game 4–3 in extra time with Mehmood scoring the second goal for WAPDA and third goal of the match in the 84th minute.

In 2009, WAPDA ended third position but Mehmood was declared the top scorer for the fourth time with 20 goals. He captained Lahore Lajpaals in the 2010 Super Football League. In 2010–11, Pakistan WAPDA was able to claim the title of national champion for the sixth time thanks to Mehmood's 21 goals.

== International career ==
Mehmood was first selected for the Pakistan national under-19 team in 2000 and went to Sri Lanka. Later played in the 2002 Asian Games in South Korea.

Mehmood earned his first senior international cap in the 2002 tour to Sri Lanka. In 2003, he played the 2006 FIFA World Cup qualifiers.

He was also called by the Pakistan under-23 national team for the 2004 South Asian Games, where he helped Pakistan win the gold medal. The next year, he featured at the 2005 Islamic Solidarity Games. He scored his first international goal in a 3–0 victory against India in 2005. He scored a hat trick against Bhutan at the 2009 SAFF Championship in a record 7–0 victory. He also captained the U23 team at the 2010 South Asian Games.

== Career statistics ==
=== Club ===
Appearances and goals by club, season and competition
Club	Season	League		League Cup		Asia		Total	
Club	Season	Apps	Goals	Apps	Goals	Apps	Goals	Apps	Goals
WAPDA	2003	6	5	–		–		6	5
WAPDA	2004–05	30	20	–		–		30	20
WAPDA	2005–06	22	16	7	4	3	2	32	22
WAPDA	2006–07	20	12	2	2	–		22	14
WAPDA	2007–08	26	21	–		–		26	21
WAPDA	2008–09	26	18	5	5	4	3	35	26
WAPDA	2009–10	26	20	4	5	–		30	25
WAPDA	2010–11	30	21	5	6	3	0	38	28
WAPDA	2011–12	30	16	–		3	1	30	16
WAPDA	2012–13	21	14	4	3	–		25	17
WAPDA	2013–14	30	19	–		–		30	19
WAPDA	2014–15	22	11	4	2	–		26	13
WAPDA	Total	289	193	31	27	13	6	333	226
Career total		289	193	31	27	13	6	333	226

=== International ===
Appearances and goals by year and competition
National team	Year	Apps	Goals
Pakistan	2003	2	0
Pakistan	2005	7	1
Pakistan	2008	3	1
Pakistan	2009	4	3
Pakistan	2011	5	2
Total		21	7

=== International goals ===
==== U-23 ====
No.	Date	Venue	Opponent	Score	Result	Competition	Ref.
1	31 January 2010	MA Aziz Stadium, Dhaka, Bangladesh	Afghanistan	1–1	1–2	2010 South Asian Games	

==== Senior ====
Scores and results list Pakistan's goal tally first, score column indicates score after each Mehmood goal.

No.	Date	Venue	Opponent	Score	Result	Competition	Ref.
1	18 June 2005	Punjab Stadium, Lahore, Pakistan	India	3–0	3–0	Friendly	
2	10 October 2008	Kuala Lumpur, Malaysia	Malaysia	1–4	1–4	Friendly	
3	8 December 2009	Bangabandhu National Stadium, Dhaka, Bangladesh	Bhutan	3–0	7–0	2009 South Asian Football Federation Championship	
4	8 December 2009	Bangabandhu National Stadium, Dhaka, Bangladesh	Bhutan	4–0	7–0	2009 South Asian Football Federation Championship	
5	8 December 2009	Bangabandhu National Stadium, Dhaka, Bangladesh	Bhutan	7–0	7–0	2009 South Asian Football Federation Championship	
6	21 March 2011	MBPJ Stadium, Petaling Jaya, Malaysia	India	1–0	1–3	2012 AFC Challenge Cup qualification	
7	25 March 2011	MBPJ Stadium, Petaling Jaya, Malaysia	Chinese Taipei	1–0	2–0	2012 AFC Challenge Cup qualification	

== Honours ==
=== WAPDA ===
- Pakistan Premier League (4): 2004–05, 2007–08, 2008–09, 2010–11

=== Individual ===
- Pakistan Premier League golden boot (5): 2004–05, 2006–07, 2007–08, 2009–10, 2010–11

Pakistan U23

- South Asian Games: 2004

== See also ==
- List of Pakistan national football team hat-tricks
