= 2008 Pakistan Premier League =

Pakistan Premier League
- Season: 2008
- Dates: 22 July 2008 – 6 December 2008
- Champions: WAPDA; 3rd Pakistan Premier League title 7th Pakistani title
- Relegated: Pakistan Steel; Pakistan Television
- AFC President's Cup: WAPDA
- Matches: 182
- Goals: 487 (2.68 per match)
- Top goalscorer: Muhammad Rasool (22 goals)
- Biggest home win: Pakistan Airlines 5–0 Pak Elektron (8 August 2008); Khan Research Laboratories 5–0 Pakistan Television (23 October 2008)
- Biggest away win: Pak Elektron 0–6 Habib Bank (23 November 2008)
- Highest scoring: National Bank 5–4 Pakistan Airlines (8 October 2008)
- Longest winning run: 8 games WAPDA
- Longest unbeaten run: 17 games WAPDA
- Longest winless run: 15 games Pakistan Television
- Longest losing run: 15 games Pakistan Television

The 2008 Pakistan Premier League was the 5th season of the Pakistan Premier League and the 54th season of Pakistan domestic football. It was held from 22 July 2008 to 6 December 2008 under the auspices of Pakistan Football Federation (PFF).

== Promotion and relegation ==
Teams promoted from 2007–08 Football Federation League

- Pak Elektron
- Pakistan Steel

Teams relegated from 2008–09 Football Federation League

- Pakistan Railways
- Wohaib

== Teams ==
=== Stadia and locations ===
Location of teams in 2008–09 Pakistan Premier League

| Team | Location | Stadium |
|---|---|---|
| Afghan Chaman | Chaman | Govt High School Ground |
| Habib Bank | Karachi | People's Football Stadium |
| Karachi Electric Supply Corporation | Karachi | People's Football Stadium |
| Karachi Port Trust | Karachi | KMC Stadium |
| Khan Research Laboratories | Rawalpindi (Kahuta) | KRL Football Stadium |
| National Bank | Karachi | Korangi Baloch Stadium |
| Pak Elektron | Lahore | Raiders FC Ground |
| Pakistan Army | Rawalpindi | Army Stadium |
| Pakistan Navy | Islamabad | Naval Sports Complex |
| Pakistan Airlines | Karachi | Korangi Baloch Stadium |
| Pakistan Steel | Karachi (Steel Town) | Quaid-e-Azam Sports Complex |
| Pakistan Television | Islamabad | Jinnah Sports Stadium |
| PMC Club Athletico Faisalabad | Faisalabad | Punjab Medical College Ground |
| WAPDA | Lahore | Railway Stadium |

== Format ==
Teams play each other on a home and away basis

The winners will represent Pakistan at the 2009 AFC President's Cup. The bottom two teams will be relegated to the Pakistan Football Federation League. Two teams will be promoted to the PPL.

The matches will be held at 1:00 and 3:00 pm respectively on home and away basis. This time the winning bonus will be Rs 500,000, the runners-up team will receive Rs 300,000 while the third position holder will receive Rs 100,000. All matches are likely to be supervised by neutral referees.

== The 2008 season ==
KPT F.C. lead from the start and up to the midway point remained ahead of KRL, WAPDA and Army, who all made slips up. However, by the final third of the season KPT began to falter, and towards the end of the season it became a three horse race between Army, WAPDA and KRL, just as it has done the past four seasons. The season ended with WAPDA holding on to the title with Army in second over perennial third placers KRL. Pakistan Steel and PTV were both relegated.

WAPDA were given Rs500,000 as champions of Pakistan, while Pakistan Amy and KRL picked up Rs300,000 and Rs200,000 respectively. The Fair Play trophy along with Rs100,000 went to Afghan Club. Player of the season and Rs100,000 went to KRL F.C. defender Samar Ishaq. His teammate Mohammad Rasool was top scorers and received Rs50,000. While Abdul Aziz of WAPDA was goalkeeper of the season and was given Rs50,000. Ali Nawaz Baloch was best match commissioner and Mohammad Rauf Bari was best referee and each took Rs50,000

== League table ==
| Pos | Team | Pld | W | D | L | GF | GA | GD | Pts | Qualification or relegation |
|---|---|---|---|---|---|---|---|---|---|---|
| 1 | WAPDA (C) | 26 | 15 | 9 | 2 | 46 | 22 | +24 | 54 | Qualification to 2009 AFC President's Cup |
| 2 | Pakistan Army | 26 | 14 | 8 | 4 | 40 | 21 | +19 | 50 | |
| 3 | Khan Research Laboratories | 26 | 13 | 8 | 5 | 46 | 24 | +22 | 47 | |
| 4 | Karachi Port Trust | 26 | 13 | 6 | 7 | 39 | 32 | +7 | 45 | |
| 5 | Pakistan Navy | 26 | 11 | 8 | 7 | 30 | 18 | +12 | 41 | |
| 6 | National Bank | 26 | 9 | 8 | 9 | 45 | 42 | +3 | 35 | |
| 7 | PMC Club Athletico Faisalabad | 26 | 10 | 5 | 11 | 33 | 38 | −5 | 35 | |
| 8 | Pakistan Airlines | 26 | 8 | 8 | 10 | 38 | 30 | +8 | 32 | |
| 9 | Habib Bank | 26 | 9 | 5 | 12 | 34 | 31 | +3 | 32 | |
| 10 | Afghan Chaman | 26 | 8 | 7 | 11 | 33 | 39 | −6 | 31 | |
| 11 | Pak Elektron | 26 | 8 | 7 | 11 | 25 | 40 | −15 | 31 | |
| 12 | Karachi Electric Supply Corporation | 26 | 8 | 6 | 12 | 32 | 40 | −8 | 30 | |
| 13 | Pakistan Steel | 26 | 6 | 11 | 9 | 27 | 36 | −9 | 29 | Relegation to 2009-10 PFF League |
| 14 | Pakistan Television | 26 | 1 | 2 | 23 | 19 | 74 | −55 | 5 | Relegation to 2009-10 PFF League |

Source: RSSSF
Rules for classification: 1) points; 2) goal difference; 3) number of goals scored
(C) Champions

== Season statistics ==
=== Scoring ===
- Fastest goal in a match: 48 seconds
  - Imran Niazi for WAPDA against KESC (9 November 2009)
  - Muhammad Akram for Pakistan Steel against HBL (24 July 2009)
- Widest winning margin: 6 goals
  - Pak Elektron 0–6 Habib Bank (23 November 2008).
- Most goals scored by losing team: 4 goals
  - National Bank 5–4 Pakistan Airlines (8 October 2008).

=== Top scorer ===
| Rank | Scorer | Club | Goals |
|---|---|---|---|
| 1 | Muhammad Rasool | Khan Research Laboratories | 22 |
| 2 | Arif Mehmood | WAPDA | 19 |
| 3 | Shakir Lashari | Pakistan Airlines | 16 |
| 4 | Abdul Rehman | Karachi Port Trust | 14 |
| 5 | Farooq Shah | National Bank | 12 |
| 6 | Muhammad Ishtiaq | Habib Bank | 10 |

=== Hat-tricks ===
| Player | For | Against | Date | Stadium |
|---|---|---|---|---|
| Haji Ahmed Shah | Afghan Chaman | Pakistan Television | 6 August 2008 | Government High School Stadium, Chaman |
| Arif Mehmood | WAPDA | National Bank | 7 August 2008 | Korangi Baloch Stadium, Karachi |
| Zeeshan Ali | Pakistan Airlines | Pak Elektron | 8 August 2008 | Korangi Baloch Stadium, Karachi |
| Muhammad Rasool | Khan Research Laboratories | Karachi Electric Supply Corporation | 12 August 2008 | People's Football Stadium, Karachi |
| Shakir Lashari | Pakistan Airlines | Pakistan Television | 14 August 2008 | Korangi Baloch Stadium, Karachi |
| Jamil Ahmed | National Bank | Pakistan Airlines | 8 October 2008 | Korangi Baloch Stadium, Karachi |
| Arif Mehmood | WAPDA | Athletico Faisalabad | 21 October 2008 | Railways Ground, Faisalabad |
| Muhammad Rasool | Khan Research Laboratories | Pakistan Television | 23 October 2008 | KRL Football Stadium, Rawalpindi |
| Muhammad Rasool | Khan Research Laboratories | Afghan Chaman | 16 November 2008 | KRL Football Stadium, Rawalpindi |
| Arif Mehmood | WAPDA | Pakistan Steel | 18 November 2008 | Punjab Stadium, Lahore |
| Jadeed Khan | Afghan Chaman | Pakistan Television | 22 November 2008 | PSB Ground, Islamabad |

== Awards ==
=== Teams & players ===
| Award | Player | Club |
|---|---|---|
| Top Scorer | Muhammad Rasool | KRL |
| Most Valuable Player | Samar Ishaq | KRL |
| Best Goalkeeper | Abdul Aziz | WAPDA |
| Fair Play | — | Afghan Chaman |

=== Referee ===
| Award | Referee | Association |
|---|---|---|
| Best Match Commissioner | Ali Nawaz Baloch | Karachi |
| Best Referee | Muhammad Rauf Bari | Lahore |
