= Pakistan Army F.C. =

Pakistani football club

Pakistan Army
- Full name: Pakistan Army Football Club
- Nicknames: The Army; The Greens
- Short name: ARM
- Founded: 1950; 76 years ago
- Ground: Army Stadium, Rawalpindi
- Capacity: 7,000
- Owners: Pakistan Army
- Chairman: Brig. Gen. Saleem Nawaz
- Head Coach: Jaffar Khan
Home colours	Away colours

The Pakistan Army Football Club serves as the football section of the Pakistan Army. The club used to compete in the National Football Championship and Pakistan Premier League. The club regularly participates in the National Football Challenge Cup.

The club is operated by the Pakistan Army Sports Directorate, and its players are employed in the Pakistan Army, and recruited through the Army's sports quota or selected from within the forces.

== History ==
=== Early years (1950–1991) ===
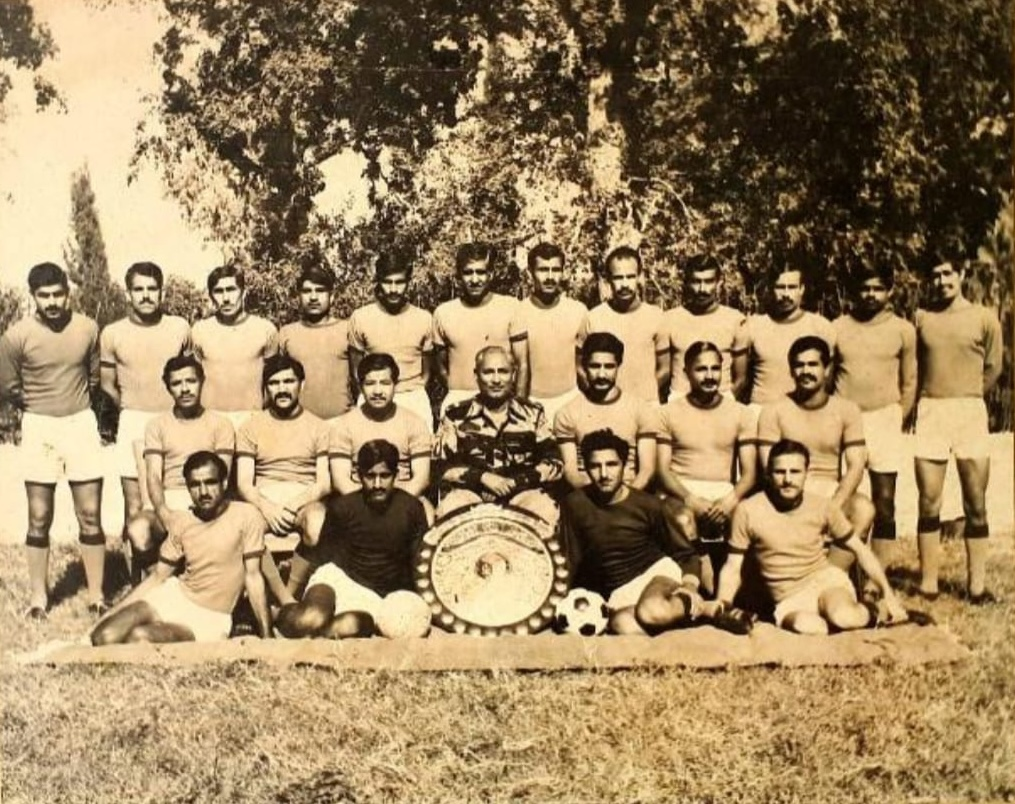
Pakistan Army football team, winners of the 1975 Inter-Services Football Championship

The club was established in 1950 by the Pakistan Army. It then regularly featured at the National Football Championship of Pakistan.

In the 1980 National Football Championship, it finished as runner-up after falling against Karachi Red in the final.

=== League era reboot & first national titles (1992–1994) ===
In the season of 1992–93 of the Lifebuoy Soap sponsored league structured National A-Division Football Championship, the club finished as runner-up after Pakistan Airlines.

The following season (1993–94), Army clinched its first national league title.

=== Domestic consistency (1995–2003) ===
After the National Football Championship reverted to the old knockout format, the team won their second title in 1995. During this decade, Army also made its mark in multi-sport competitions, capturing the football gold medal at the National Games in 1995 and 1997.

Army also won the President PFF Cup in 2000 and 2001, alongside another National Games gold in 2001.

=== Pakistan Premier League & continental participation (2004–2007) ===
The club was one of the founding members of newly formed Pakistan Premier League, appearing in the first edition in 2004, where the team finished runner-up after WAPDA.

Army clinched the second 2005 Pakistan Premier League title with 51 points, with striker Imran Hussain as the Golden Boot with 21 goals. As 2005 champions, Army qualified for the 2006 AFC President’s Cup in Kuching, Malaysia, where they lost to Tatung and Transport United but earned a 1–1 draw with Khemara, exiting at the group stage.

They repeated as champions in 2006–07, and subsequently played at 2007 AFC President's Cup on home soil in Lahore, drawing with Ratnam, and narrow defeats to Regar-TadAZ and Transport United.

During this period, Army also won the National Games gold in 2004 and 2007.

=== Near misses and stability (2007–2015) ===
Following their two back-to-back titles, Army finished runners-up in three consecutive PPL seasons (2007–08, 2008–09, 2009–10). The club later placed second again in 2014–15. In 2016, Pakistan Army defeated Pakistan Airlines in the All-Pakistan Football Tournament at the Peoples Football Stadium in Karachi.

=== Recent years (2018–present) ===
After years of turmoil within the Pakistan Football Federation, resulting in domestic football inactivity, Army finished 4th in the league's return season in 2018–19. Later on, the team won the National Football Challenge Cup in 2019.

== Stadium ==
The Army Stadium in Rawalpindi serve as the team own ground. It has regularly hosted several Pakistan Premier League and National Challenge Cup fixtures.

== Competitive record ==
The club's competitive record since the 2004 season are listed below.

Season	Div	Tms	Pos	National Challenge Cup	AFC President's Cup	AFC Cup
2004	Pakistan Premier League	16	2	–	DNP	DNP
2005	Pakistan Premier League	12	1	Semi-finals	DNP	DNP
2006–07	Pakistan Premier League	12	1	–	Group stage	DNP
2007–08	Pakistan Premier League	14	2	–	Group stage	DNP
2008	Pakistan Premier League	14	2	–	DNP	DNP
2009	Pakistan Premier League	14	2	Quarter-finals	DNP	DNP
2010	Pakistan Premier League	16	5	Semi-finals	DNP	DNP
2011	Pakistan Premier League	16	3	Semi-finals	DNP	DNP
2012–13	Pakistan Premier League	16	4	Quarter-finals	DNP	DNP
2013–14	Pakistan Premier League	16	5	Quarter-finals	DNP	DNP
2014–15	Pakistan Premier League	12	2	–	DNP	DNP
2018–19	Pakistan Premier League	–	No League Held	Semi-finals	DNP	DNP
2021–22	Pakistan Premier League	–	No League Held	Semi-finals	DNP	DNP
2018–19	Pakistan Premier League	16	4	Quarter-finals	DNP	DNP

== Performance in AFC competitions ==
Win Draw Loss

Season	Competition	Round	Club	First leg	Second leg	Aggregate
2006	AFC President's Cup	Group stage	(Taiwan) Tatung	1–4		
2006	AFC President's Cup	Group stage	(Bhutan) Transport United	0–1		
2006	AFC President's Cup	Group stage	(Cambodia) Khemara	1–1		
2007	AFC President's Cup	Group stage	(Sri Lanka) Ratnam Sports Club	3–3		
2007	AFC President's Cup	Group stage	(Tajikistan) Regar-TadAZ	1–2		
2007	AFC President's Cup	Group stage	(Bhutan) Transport United	2–3		

== Honours ==
=== Domestic ===
- National Football Championship
  - Winners (2): 1993–94, 1995
- Pakistan Premier League
  - Winners (2): 2005–06, 2006–07
- National Football Challenge Cup
  - Winners (3): 2000, 2001, 2019
- National Games
  - Winners (5): 1995, 1997, 2001, 2004, 2007
- Inter-Services Football Championship
  - Winners (1): 1975
