= Khan Research Laboratories FC =

Association football club in Pakistan

Khan Research Laboratories
- Full name: Khan Research Laboratories Football Club
- Nickname: Khans
- Short name: KRL
- Founded: 1995; 31 years ago
- Ground: KRL Football Stadium
- Capacity: 8,000
- Owner: Khan Research Laboratories
- Chairman: Tahir Ikram
- Head Coach: Samar Ishaq
Home colours	Away colours

Khan Research Laboratories Football Club, abbreviated as KRL, serves as the football section of Khan Research Laboratories. Based in Rawalpindi, the club plays their home games at KRL Football Stadium. The club used to compete in the National Football Championship and Pakistan Premier League. The club regularly participates in the National Football Challenge Cup.

The club has won five Pakistan Premier League titles and six National Football Challenge Cups. With these eleven trophies, they are the most successful club in the country. They are the only Pakistani club to have reached a continental club final, the 2013 AFC President's Cup, where they lost 1–0 to Balkan FK.

== History ==
=== Early years (1995–1998) ===
The football team of the company Khan Research Laboratories was established in 1995, on the request of scientist Dr Abdul Qadeer Khan, and with the help and partnership of former international defender Ayaz Butt.

The following year, they entered the departmental tournament of Pakistan 1996 President PFF Cup, failing to advance to the next stage. In its early years, the team also acquired service of Pakistan international players such as Sarfraz Rasool, Sajjad Hussain and Amir Ali Qureshi.

In 1998, the team entered the National Football Championship, the premier football competition of Pakistan, in the 1998 season, where they lost 2–0 to Allied Bank in the quarter-finals. In the 1998 President PFF Cup, they also lost in quarter-finals to Pakistan Police.

=== Emergence (1999–2003) ===
In 1999, they reached the semi-finals of the National Football Championship, after finishing top of their group and winning both their group matches 4–1 and 6–3 against Pakistan Railways and Balochistan Red, respectively. They defeated Karachi Metropolitan 4–0 and Pakistan Railways 3–2 on penalties after drawing the game 2–2 in regulation time. They lost 1–0 to Pakistan Navy in the semi-finals. In the 1999 President PFF Cup, the team finished as runner-up after losing to Allied Bank by penalties after a 1–1 draw. The team however took place of Allied Bank in the Asian Cup Winners' Cup for the 2000–01 edition, where they drew 1–1, and lost 0–6 in the other leg of the qualifying first round against Thai club BEC Tero Sasana.

In the 2000 season of the National Championship, Khan Research Laboratories reached the Round of 16, when they topped the group again after defeating Punjab Greens and WAPDA 8–1 and 3–0, respectively. In the Round of 16 they lost 1–0 to that season's runners-up Karachi Port Trust.

The next season, they topped the group yet again when they defeated Pakistan Police and Sindh Greens 1–0 and 5–1, respectively. Sajjad of Khan Research Laboratories scored a hat-trick in the latter match. In the round of 16, they thrashed University Grants Commission 6–0, with Allah Nawaz scoring four goals. In the quarter-finals they defeated Allied Bank 3–2 and defeated their group team Pakistan Police 2–1 in the semi-finals. Khan Research Laboratories drew 1–1 to WAPDA in the finals, only to lose 4–3 on penalties.

In the 2002 season, Khan Research Laboratories, top of the group for the fourth consecutive season, defeated University Grants Commission 5–1 and drew 1–1 with Sindh Red. In the Round of 16, they defeated Balochistan Green 1–0. Khan Research Laboratories defeated Federally Administered Tribal Areas 2–1 in the quarter-finals and lost to Pakistan Army 1–0 in the semi-finals.

=== Establishment in the national league (2004–2009) ===
Khan Research Laboratories became a dominant side since the inception of the re-branded Pakistan Premier League, finishing third in the 2004–05 season, scoring 98 goals in 30 matches (a goal ratio of 3.26 goals per match), winning 23 and drawing and losing four and three matches respectively.

=== Rise to prominence (2009–2011) ===
They finished third in four further seasons, 2005–06, 2006–07, 2007–08, and 2008–09 seasons, before winning their first-ever league and national title in the 2009–10 season, when they won the league on goal difference after being tied on 60 points. Khan Research Laboratories had a goal difference +32 against +22 of Pakistan Army.

Khan Research Laboratories completed the double, when they won the 2009 National Football Challenge Cup defeating Pakistan Airlines 1–0 in the finals. Khan Research Laboratories' first appearance in the Asian competition came in the 2010 AFC President's Cup, when they finished second to Vakhsh Qurghonteppa in the group stage.

In the 2010–11 season, they finished second to league winners WAPDA. However, they successfully defended the National Football Challenge Cup, defeating Pakistan Navy 4–0 in the finals.

=== Domestic dominance and continental final (2011–2014) ===
In April 2011, the club appointed veteran Tariq Lutfi as head coach of the team, replacing KRL long term head coach Sajjad Mehmood. Khan Research Laboratories subsequently won three league titles consecutively, winning in 2011–12, 2012–13 and 2013–14. In the 2011–12 and 2012–13 season, Khan Research Laboratories completed a consecutive double when they won the League and Challenge Cup. In latter seasons, they won the league after their star forward Kaleemullah Khan scored 35 goals including 7 hat-tricks.

In the 2012 AFC President's Cup, they finished second in the group stage after drawing both their games 0–0 against Erchim and Taiwan Power Company, thus qualifying for the final stage where they finished bottom of the group.

KRL's starting line-up at the 2013 AFC President's Cup final against Balkan FK.
Coach: Tariq Lutfi

Their win in the 2012 season qualified them for a spot in the 2013 AFC President's Cup. In the group stage, held in May 2013, they were drawn against Kyrgyzstan-based Dordoi Bishkek, Philippines-based Global and Bhutan-based Yeedzin. KRL drew 1–1 with Dordoi, beat Global 2–0 and also went past Yeedzin 8–0. They finished second in the group behind Dordoi based on goal difference as both clubs had 7 points from their 3 encounters. Through this result, the club qualified for the final group stage, which was played in September 2013. In the final group stage, they were drawn against the Palestinian side Hilal Al-Quds and their rivals from the first group stage, Dordoi Bishkek. They won both of their games and progressed to the final, becoming the first ever Pakistani club to feature in a continental final, where they lost 1–0 to Turkmen side Balkan.

In the 2014 AFC President's Cup they finished bottom of the group in the first stage.

=== Challenges and resurgence (2014–2019) ===
In the 2014–15 season, they finished sixth after losing their star players, Kaleemullah Khan and Muhammad Adil to Kyrgyz club FC Dordoi Bishkek. Head coach Tariq Lutfi left the team in March 2015, and Sajjad Mehmood took over again as head coach of the team. They won a further two Challenge Cups in 2015 and 2016, becoming the most successful club in the National Football Challenge Cup, winning the tournament six times in total.

In 2017, with the Pakistan Football Federation still paralysed by internal disputes and official competitions suspended, National Bank of Pakistan organised a separate 2017 NBP President's Cup, which KRL won after defeating WAPDA 1–0 in the final.

The team returned for the 2018–19 Pakistan Premier League season after years of federation turmoil and football inactivity, winning their fifth Premier League title after defeating Sui Southern Gas 4–0 on the final match day, making them the most successful club since the inception of the Pakistan Premier League.

=== 2023–present ===
Following the domestic football revamp in the country in 2023, departmental clubs including Khan Research Laboratories remained competing in the National Football Challenge Cup.

== Stadium ==
The KRL Football Stadium in Rawalpindi, owned by the parent company Khan Research Laboratories serve as the team own ground. It has regularly hosted several Pakistan Premier League and National Challenge Cup fixtures.

== Rivalries ==
In the early 2010s, the club developed a notable rivalry with Karachi-based K-Electric. The rivalry started when K-Electric and Khan Research Laboratories faced off in two back-to-back Pakistan National Challenge Cup finals, in 2011 and 2012, with Khan Research Laboratories winning both the finals 1–0 and 3–1 on penalties with game drawn 0–0 after extra time respectively. K-Electric won the league in the 2014-15 season, ending the reign of Khan Research Laboratories as domestic champions.

== Coaching history ==
- Unknown (1995–2006)
- (Pakistan) Sajjad Mehmood (2007–2010)
- (Pakistan) Tariq Lutfi (2011–2015)
- (Pakistan) Sajjad Mehmood (2015–2022)
- (Pakistan) Muhammad Essa (2023)
- (Pakistan) Samar Ishaq (2026)

== Competitive record ==
=== Overall ===
The club's competitive record since the 2004–05 season are listed below.

Season	Div	Tms	Pos	National Challenge Cup	AFC President's Cup	AFC Cup
2004–05	Pakistan Premier League	16	3	–	DNP	DNP
2005–06	Pakistan Premier League	12	3	Semi-finals	DNP	DNP
2006–07	Pakistan Premier League	12	3	–	DNP	DNP
2007–08	Pakistan Premier League	14	3	Runners-up	DNP	DNP
2008–09	Pakistan Premier League	14	3	Winners	DNP	DNP
2009–10	Pakistan Premier League	14	Winners	Winners	Group stage	DNP
2010–11	Pakistan Premier League	16	2	Winners	DNP	DNP
2011–12	Pakistan Premier League	16	Winners	Winners	Final Group stage	DNP
2012–13	Pakistan Premier League	16	Winners	Quarter-finals	Runners-up	DNP
2013–14	Pakistan Premier League	16	Winners	Quarter-finals	Group stage	DNP
2014–15	Pakistan Premier League	12	6	Winners	DNP	DNP
2016–17	Pakistan Premier League	–	No League Held	Winners	DNP	DNP
2018–19	Pakistan Premier League	16	Winners	Group stage	DNP	DNP

== Performance in AFC competitions ==
Win Draw Loss

Season	Competition	Round	Club	First leg	Second leg	Aggregate
2000–01	Asian Cup Winners' Cup	First Round	(Thailand) BEC Tero Sasana	1–1	0–6	1–7
2010	AFC President's Cup	Group stage	(Cambodia) Naga Corp	2–1		
2010	AFC President's Cup	Group stage	(Tajikistan) Vakhsh Qurghonteppa	0–1		
2010	AFC President's Cup	Group stage	(Sri Lanka) Renown	1–2		
2012	AFC President's Cup	Group stage	(Mongolia) Erchim	0–0		
2012	AFC President's Cup	Group stage	Taiwan Power Company	0–0		
2012	AFC President's Cup	Final Group stage	Taiwan Power Company	1–3		
2012	AFC President's Cup	Final Group stage	(Palestine) Markaz Shabab Al-Am'ari	1–5		
2013	AFC President's Cup	Group stage	(Kyrgyzstan) Dordoi Bishkek	1–1		
2013	AFC President's Cup	Group stage	(Philippines) Global	2–0		
2013	AFC President's Cup	Group stage	(Bhutan) Yeedzin	8–0		
2013	AFC President's Cup	Final Group stage	(Kyrgyzstan) Dordoi Bishkek	1–0		
2013	AFC President's Cup	Final Group stage	(Palestine) Hilal Al-Quds	2–0		
2013	AFC President's Cup	Final	(Turkmenistan) Balkan	0–1		
2014	AFC President's Cup	Group stage	(Bangladesh) Sheikh Russel	0–0		
2014	AFC President's Cup	Group stage	(Bhutan) Ugyen Academy	3–0		
2014	AFC President's Cup	Group stage	Sri Lanka Air Force	0–3		

== Honours ==
=== Domestic ===
- Pakistan Premier League:
  - Champions (5): 2009–10, 2011–12, 2012–13, 2013–14, 2018–19
- National Football Challenge Cup:
  - Champions (6): 2009, 2010, 2011, 2012, 2015, 2016
- NBP President's Cup:
  - Winners (1): 2017

=== Continental ===
- AFC President's Cup:
  - Runners-up (1): 2013
