= Pakistan Premier League =

Pakistan football federation league

- Organising body: Pakistan Football Federation
- Founded: 2004; 22 years ago
- Folded: 2021; 5 years ago
- Country: Pakistan
- Confederation: AFC
- Level on pyramid: 1 (2004–2021)
- Relegation to: PFF League
- Domestic cup: PFF National Challenge Cup
- International cup(s): AFC President's Cup (2004–14); AFC Cup (2015–21)
- Most championships: Khan Research Laboratories (5 titles)

The Pakistan Premier League (PPL; Urdu: پاکستان پریمیئر لیگ) was the top tier of the Pakistani football league system from 2004 to 2021. It operated on a system of promotion and relegation with the PFF League. The league was held regularly from 2004 until 2015, when a crisis within the Pakistan Football Federation led to the suspension of domestic football competitions. After a three-year hiatus, the league returned for the 2018–19 season. A subsequent 2021–22 season was launched but was later cancelled and declared null and void.

During the league's existence, four clubs won the title: Khan Research Laboratories (5), WAPDA (4), Pakistan Army (2) and K-Electric (1).

== History ==
=== Origins ===
The National Football Championship served as the highest level football competition from 1948 to 2003, held on knock-out basis and a closed format competition rather than league system. The origins of national league football in Pakistan can be traced to 1992, when under the tenure of PFF General Secretary Hafiz Salman Butt, the 1992–93 and 1993–94 seasons of National Football Championship were contested in a league-style format rather than as a knockout competition, becoming Pakistan's first ever national league format competition. Sponsored as the National Lifebuoy A-Division Football Championship, the tournament ran across several months and introduced a system of promotion and relegation with the second-tier National Lifebuoy B-Division Football Championship. The A-Division titles were won by Pakistan Airlines (1992–93) and Pakistan Army (1993–94), while the B-Division was won by Crescent Textile Mills (1992), National Bank (1993), and Frontier Scouts (1994).

The experiment lasted only two seasons. Following Butt's removal from office in 1994, the competition reverted to its previous knockout format.

=== National A Division Football League (2004) ===
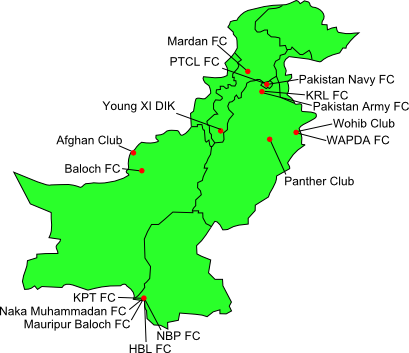
The 16 clubs of the inaugural season of the National A Division Football League

In August 2003, the PFF came under new management, as Faisal Saleh Hayat took over. Under the new management, the Pakistan Football Federation phased out the National Football Championship, and in 2004 introduced the National A Division Football League, which contained 16 clubs.

WAPDA became the inaugural champions, with Army finishing second and KRL third. After completion of the season in October 2004, PFF launched the second tier PFF League with 5 clubs with promotion and relegation.

=== Pakistan Premier League (2005–2015) ===
In 2005 season, the National A Division Football League was renamed to the Pakistan Premier League. In 2006, the Pakistan Football Federation introduced the National Club Championship as a third tier championship beneath the PFF League, although it is unknown whether it was held again as a third-tier competition.

The Super Football League of 2007, also ran as a parallel franchise-based league to Pakistan Premier League, held in Karachi and saw record crowds at Peoples Stadium. It wasn't until 2010 with the next edition that the Geo League came back only to be discontinued due to differences with the PFF.

=== Suspension and 2018–19 revival ===
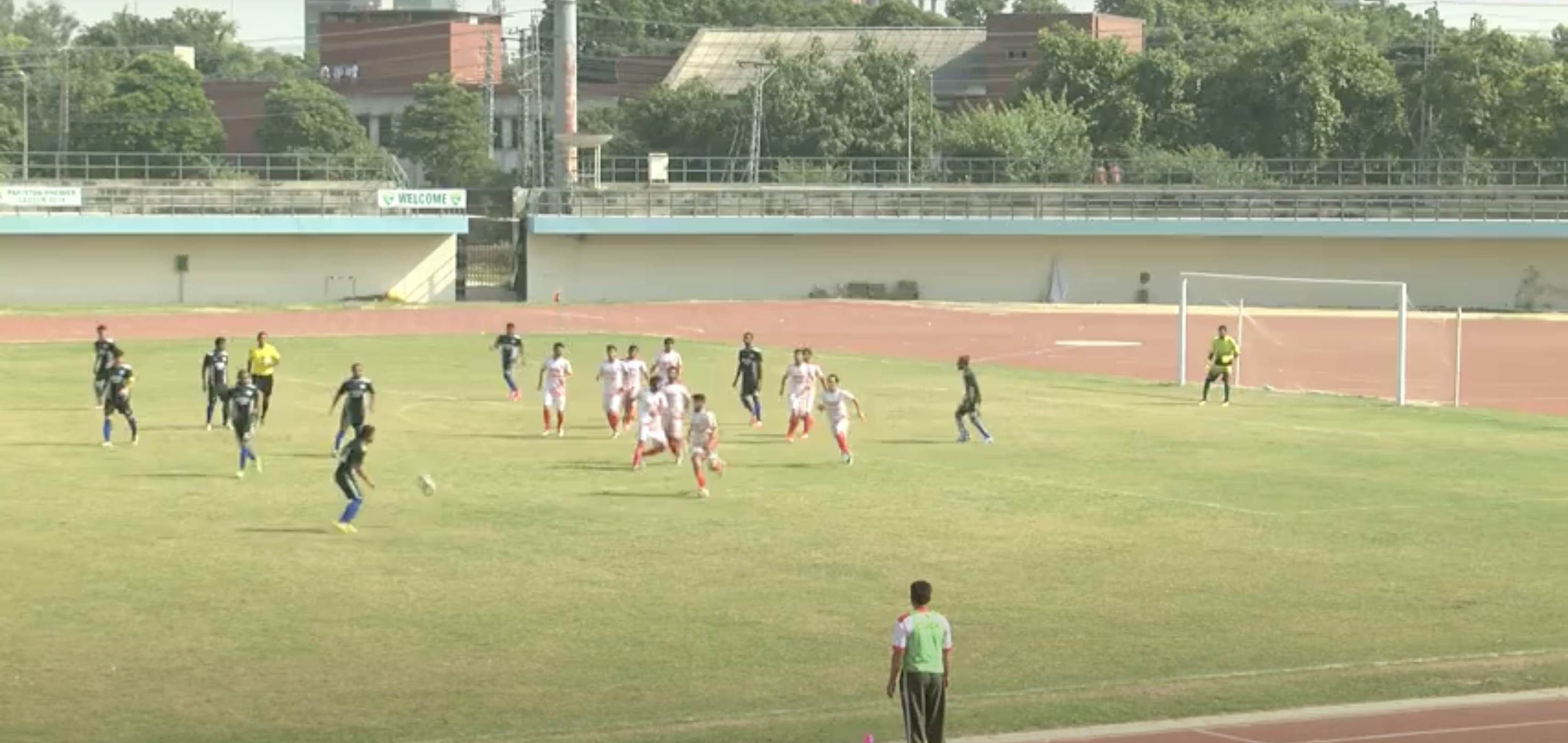
Afghan Chaman against the Ashraf Sugar Mills departmental team during the 2018–19 Pakistan Premier League

The league was suspended in 2015 due to the Pakistan Football Federation crisis, until the lift on suspension by FIFA on 13 March 2018. The 2018–19 season was organised by two different federations, and was reportedly not recognised by FIFA and AFC. Faisal Saleh Hayat-led Pakistan Football Federation, which was internationally recognised, started the league and non-FIFA recognised Ashfaq Hussain Shah group, which formed a parallel PFF, coming into power by third-party interference through the PFF elections conducted by the Supreme Court a month before the termination of the season completed the event.

=== 2021–22 abandonment ===
After the suspension once again from all football activities by FIFA on 7 April 2021, the 2021–22 season was initially organised by the Ashfaq Hussain Shah group, who again came to power after attacking and taking charge of the PFF office. The tournament was suspended after a few months into the season and then cancelled.

=== Proposed revamp ===
Earlier proposals for restructuring Pakistan's domestic football had included parallel competitions; in 2019, TouchSky Group proposed a franchise league alongside a rebranded Pakistan Premier League. In June 2024, the Pakistan Football Federation Normalisation Committee announced that it was considering separate premier competitions for clubs and departmental teams. Under the proposed club structure, district-level competitions would be followed by provincial rounds, with one or two leading clubs from each province and region progressing to a PFF-run national competition of potentially more than a dozen clubs. The Normalisation Committee also envisaged a short-form franchise competition alongside a conventional league lasting around 30 weeks.

Plans for Pakistan's domestic league structure continued to evolve following the election of a new PFF administration in 2025. During the bidding process for a new professional league, proposals included both club-based and franchise-based models. In December 2025, a representative of one of the bidding groups advocated for the coexistence of a franchise league and a separate club league.

In June 2026, the PFF announced a new nationwide District Football Championship, with a National Club Championship planned as the next stage of the club pathway.

== Names ==
Season	Name
2004	National A Division Football League
2005–2021	Pakistan Premier League

== Champions ==
=== List of champions by season ===
For champions before the Premier League see List of Pakistan football champions.

Edition	Season	Champions	Runners-up	Third place
1st	2004	WAPDA	Pakistan Army	KRL
2nd	2005	Pakistan Army	WAPDA	KRL
3rd	2006–07	Pakistan Army	WAPDA	KRL
4th	2007–08	WAPDA	Pakistan Army	KRL
5th	2008	WAPDA	Pakistan Army	KRL
6th	2009	KRL	Pakistan Army	WAPDA
7th	2010	WAPDA	KRL	Pakistan Airlines
8th	2011	KRL	Afghan Chaman	Pakistan Army
9th	2012–13	KRL	K-Electric	Muslim FC
10th	2013–14	KRL	K-Electric	WAPDA
11th	2014–15	K-Electric	Pakistan Army	Pakistan Air Force
12th	2018–19	KRL	Pakistan Air Force	Sui Southern Gas
n/a	2021–22	abandoned		

=== Most successful clubs ===
Team	Winners	Runners-up	Third place
KRL	5 (2009, 2011, 2012–13, 2013–14, 2018–19)	1 (2010)	5 (2004, 2005, 2006–07, 2007–08, 2008)
WAPDA	4 (2004, 2007–08, 2008, 2010)	2 (2005, 2006–07)	2 (2009, 2013–14)
Pakistan Army	2 (2005, 2006–07)	5 (2004, 2007–08, 2008, 2009, 2014–15)	1 (2011)
K-Electric	1 (2014–15)	2 (2012–13, 2013–14)	—
Pakistan Air Force	—	1 (2018–19)	1 (2014–15)
Afghan Chaman	—	1 (2011)	—
Pakistan Airlines	—	—	1 (2010)
Muslim	—	—	1 (2012–13)
Sui Southern Gas	—	—	1 (2018–19)

== Competition format ==
=== Competition ===
Clubs played each other twice, once at home and once away. Teams received three points for a win and one point for a draw, and were ranked by points, followed by goal difference and goals scored. The two lowest-placed teams were relegated to the PFF League, while the top two teams from the PFF League were promoted.

Number of clubs in Pakistan Premier League throughout the years
Period (in years)	No. of clubs
2004	16 clubs
2005–2007	12 clubs
2007–2010	14 clubs
2011–2014	16 clubs
2014–2015	14 clubs
2018–2019	16 clubs

=== Qualification for Asian competitions ===
The top team in the PPL automatically qualified for the AFC President's Cup until its abolishment in 2014, it was the weakest branch of Asian Football, but the winner of the PPL would later be nominated for the AFC Cup from 2016.

== Sponsorship ==
Period	Sponsor	Notes	Ref.
2009–10	KASB Bank	PFF signed a partnership deal with KASB Bank, from 2009 to 2013. However, the deal was cancelled after just one season.	

== Awards ==
=== Top scorer ===
Year	Player/s	Club	Goals	Ref.
2004	(Pakistan) Arif Mehmood	WAPDA	20	
2005	(Pakistan) Imran Hussain	Pakistan Army	21	
2006–07	(Pakistan) Arif Mehmood	WAPDA	18	
2007–08	(Pakistan) Arif Mehmood	WAPDA	21	
2008	(Pakistan) Muhammad Rasool	KRL	22	
2009	(Pakistan) Arif Mehmood	WAPDA	20	
2010	(Pakistan) Arif Mehmood	WAPDA	21	
2011	(Pakistan) Jadid Khan	Afghan Chaman	22	
2012–13	(Pakistan) Kaleemullah Khan	Khan Research Laboratories	35	
2013–14	(Pakistan) Muhammad bin Younus	Karachi Port Trust	27	
2014–15	(Pakistan) Muhammad Rasool	K-Electric	22	
2018–19	(Pakistan) Ansar Abbas	Pakistan Army	15	

=== Most valuable player ===
Year	Player/s	Club	Ref.
2004	(Pakistan) Khuda Bakhsh	WAPDA	
2005	(Pakistan) Adeel Ahmed	Pakistan Telecommunication	
2006–07	(Pakistan) Adeel Ahmed	Pakistan Telecommunication	
2007–08	(Pakistan) Muhammad Imran	Pakistan Army	
2008	(Pakistan) Samar Ishaq	Khan Research Laboratories	
2009	(Pakistan) Nasrullah Khan	Pakistan Airlines	
2010	(Pakistan) Muhammad Haji	Pakistan Airlines	
2011	(Pakistan) Samar Ishaq	Khan Research Laboratories	
2012–13	(Pakistan) Saeed Ahmed	Muslim	
2013–14	(Pakistan) Kaleemullah Khan	Khan Research Laboratories	
2014–15	(Pakistan) Mansoor Khan	Pakistan Air Force	
2014–15	(Pakistan) Muhammad Mujahid	Pakistan Air Force	
2018–19	(Pakistan) Muhammad Naeem	Civil Aviation Authority	

=== Goalkeeper of the year ===
Year	Player/s	Club	Ref.
2004	(Pakistan) Jaffar Khan	Pakistan Army	
2005	(Pakistan) Jaffar Khan	Pakistan Army	
2006–07	(Pakistan) Jaffar Khan	Pakistan Army	
2007–08	(Pakistan) Jaffar Khan	Pakistan Army	
2008	(Pakistan) Abdul Aziz	WAPDA	
2009	(Pakistan) Ghulam Nabi	Khan Research Laboratories	
2010	(Pakistan) Muhammad Omer	K-Electric	
2011	(Pakistan) Jaffar Khan	Pakistan Army	
2012–13	(Pakistan) Jaffar Khan	Pakistan Army	
2013–14	(Pakistan) Muzammil Hussain	WAPDA	
2014–15	(Pakistan) Muzammil Hussain	WAPDA	
2018–19	(Pakistan) Tanvir Mumtaz	Khan Research Laboratories	

=== Fair play trophy ===
Year	Club	Ref.
2004	Pakistan Telecommunication	
2005	Pakistan Telecommunication	
2006–07	Afghan Chaman	
2007–08	Pakistan Television	
2008	Afghan Chaman	
2009	Pakistan Airlines	
2010	Afghan Chaman	
2011	Pakistan Airlines	
2012–13	Zarai Taraqiati	
2013–14	Khan Research Laboratories	
2014–15	Muslim	
2018–19	K-Electric	

== Criticism ==
The Pakistan Premier League was criticised for its precarious and unprofessional setup. Teams largely relied on departmental sports budgets, with many players employed by their respective departments rather than as professional footballers. The league was dominated by departmental and armed forces teams, while private clubs struggled financially. The PFF was also criticised for failing to attract significant private investment and sponsorship.

The league also suffered from poor attendances, although non-departmental clubs such as Afghan Chaman, Baloch Nushki and Muslim FC attracted comparatively stronger support. In contrast, the regional Karachi Football League routinely attracted healthy crowds.

Critics also pointed to congested scheduling and its effect on players. Teams could be required to play three matches in five days, with cost-cutting measures contributing to player exhaustion. The league's "amateurish" setup was also criticised for limiting player development.

== See also ==
- Football in Pakistan
- List of Pakistan football champions
- Pakistan Premier League Golden Boot
- Super Football League
