= WAPDA F.C. =

Pakistani football club

WAPDA
- Full name: Water & Power Development Authority Football Club
- Nickname: The Watermen
- Short name: WAP
- Founded: 1960; 66 years ago
- Ground: WAPDA Sports Complex, Lahore
- Owner: WAPDA
- Head Coach: Mohammad Habib
Home colours	Away colours

WAPDA Football Club serves as the football section of Water & Power Development Authority. It is based in Lahore, Punjab, Pakistan. The club used to compete in the National Football Championship and Pakistan Premier League. The club regularly participates in the National Football Challenge Cup.

WAPDA has been Pakistan champions 8 times, winning four titles in the National Football Championship, and four Pakistan Premier League titles including the inaugural edition in 2004. They are the only Pakistani club to finish the season unbeaten in the 2007–08 season.

== History ==
=== Early years (1960s) ===
WAPDA football team was established shortly after the formation of WAPDA Sports Board in 1960. In 1961, they already started featuring in several domestic matches, including participating in the Lahore District Football League.

=== Early success (1980s–1990s) ===
WAPDA emerged as a departmental power in the early 1980s, winning the National Football Championship title in their maiden appearance in the national competition after defeating Habib Bank in the final.

In 1991, WAPDA won their second National Football Championship title defeating Habib Bank in the final. Hence, WAPDA's first ever Asian competition appearance was in the 1991 Asian Club Championship, where they lost 5–0 to Dhaka Mohammedan SC away, and drew 0–0 at home, thus losing 5–0 on aggregate.

In 1992, WAPDA won the National Games of Pakistan football competition under head coach Muhammad Aslam Japani, defeating Punjab Reds in the final at Minto Park in Lahore.

=== Rise to domestic dominance (2000–2011) ===
In the early 2000s, WAPDA won two consecutive National Football Championship titles in 2001 and 2003.

Following the disbandment of the National Championship in 2003, WAPDA became the inaugural champions of the newly formed Pakistan Premier League in 2004, with their striker Arif Mehmood, finishing top scorer. The team subsequently represented Pakistan in the AFC President's Cup 2005, losing both of their games against Blue Star SC and Hello United and defeated Dordoi Bishkek 1–0 in their last group stage match as they were knocked-out of out the group stages.

In the 2007 Pakistan Premier League, WAPDA finished the season unbeaten after defeating Pakistan Army on the final day. They became the first Pakistani club to finish the season unbeaten, earning the title of the Invincibles. The club's next appearance in Asian competition was in 2008 AFC President's Cup, where once again they finished at bottom of their group, drawing one and losing two matches.

After winning the 2008 Pakistan Premier League, the team featured in the 2009 AFC President's Cup. WAPDA finished second in their group and qualified for semi-finals after being the best second-placed in the tournament, WAPDA faced their group-mate Regar-TadAZ in the semi-finals, where WAPDA lost 4–3 at extra-time.

WAPDA clinched another Pakistan Premier League title in 2010, subsequently making an appearance in 2011 AFC President's Cup, where they finished third in their group and were knocked out. In 2010, the team also won the National Games after defeating Pakistan Air Force in the final. In 2012, WAPDA again clinched gold at the National Games after defeating Pakistan Police.

=== Decline and turbulence (2013–2019) ===
In 2017, with the Pakistan Football Federation still paralysed by internal disputes and official competitions suspended, National Bank of Pakistan organised a separate 2017 NBP President's Cup, which KRL won after defeating WAPDA 1–0 in the final.

The team returned for the 2018–19 Pakistan Premier League season after years of federation turmoil and football inactivity, ending fifth in the table.

=== Resurgence (2020–present) ===
In 2020, former international defender Tanveer Ahmed took over as WAPDA head coach. subsequently in 2020, WAPDA won their first National Challenge Cup title after defeating Sui Southern Gas, this was WAPDA's first major trophy in almost a decade since the 2010 Pakistan Premier League title.

Following the domestic football revamp in the country in 2023, departmental clubs including WAPDA remained competing in the National Football Challenge Cup. In the 2023–24 National Football Challenge Cup, WAPDA won the title after defeating SA Gardens in the final. The team won its third consecutive title after defeating Khan Research Laboratories at the 2026 National Football Challenge Cup.

== Club administration and structure ==
WAPDA's football team is administered centrally by the WAPDA Sports Board, established in 1960, which organises annual inter-unit sports competitions across WAPDA bodies. The representative side is drawn from footballers employed across WAPDA-affiliated companies, including HESCO, LESCO, MEPCO, GEPCO, FESCO, NTDC and QESCO.

In domestic cup play, WAPDA have on occasion entered a regional unit side. For the 2011 National Football Challenge Cup, WAPDA fielded their Multan-region team, MEPCO.

== Stadium ==
The WAPDA department owns the WAPDA Sports Complex in Kot Lakhpat, whose main ground can be used for football, cricket and athletics. Construction of the complex began in 1987, and its first phase was completed in 2002. It was initially selected as one of the venues for the 2007 AFC President's Cup, although the tournament was subsequently rescheduled and the complex was not used. It has hosted several editions of the National Women's Football Championship.

The WAPDA football team has also used several grounds in Lahore for most of its home fixtures top-flight fixtures, such as Railway Stadium and Punjab Stadium.

== Coaching history ==
- Unknown (1983–1990s)
- (Pakistan) Muhammad Aslam Japani (1990–1992)
- Unknown (1990s–2003)
- (Pakistan) Khalid Butt (2004–2011)
- (Pakistan) Mohammad Habib (caretaker, 2010) (Note: In November 2010, due to AFC coaching license requirements, WAPDA appointed Mohammad Habib as their officially qualified coach for the remainder of the 2010 Pakistan Premier League season, even though Khalid Butt remained the team's head coach in practice. Habib also served as official coach at the 2010 National Games, where he led WAPDA to gold.)
- (Pakistan) Sharafat Ali (2011–2013)
- (Pakistan) Khalid Butt (2013–2015)
- (Pakistan) Mohammad Habib (2016–2017)
- (Pakistan) Khalid Butt (2017–2019)
- (Pakistan) Tanveer Ahmed (2020)
- (Pakistan) Mohammad Habib (2023–present)

== Performance in AFC competitions ==
Win Draw Loss

Season	Competition	Round	Club	First leg	Second leg	Aggregate
1991–92	Asian Club Championship	Qualifying Stage	(Bangladesh) Dhaka Mohammedan	0–5	0–0	0–5
2005	AFC President's Cup	Group stage	(Sri Lanka) Blue Star SC	0–1		
2005	AFC President's Cup	Group stage	(Cambodia) Hello United	1–2		
2005	AFC President's Cup	Group stage	(Kyrgyzstan) Dordoi-Dynamo	1–0		
2008	AFC President's Cup	Group stage	(Tajikistan) Regar-TadAZ	1–2		
2008	AFC President's Cup	Group stage	Nepal Police Club	1–1		
2008	AFC President's Cup	Group stage	(Bangladesh) Dhaka Abahani	0–1		
2009	AFC President's Cup	Group stage	(Tajikistan) Regar-TadAZ	0–0		
2009	AFC President's Cup	Group stage	Nepal Police Club	0–0		
2009	AFC President's Cup	Group stage	Taiwan Power Company	3–1		
2009	AFC President's Cup	Semi-finals	(Tajikistan) Regar-TadAZ	3–4		
2011	AFC President's Cup	Group stage	Nepal Police Club	2–0		
2011	AFC President's Cup	Group stage	(Taiwan) Taipower	0–3		
2011	AFC President's Cup	Group stage	(Turkmenistan) Balkan	0–1		

== Honours ==
=== Domestic ===
- National Football Championship
  - Winners (4): 1983, 1991, 2001, 2003
- Pakistan Premier League
  - Winners (4): 2004–05, 2007–08, 2008–09, 2010–11
- National Football Challenge Cup
  - Winners (3): 2020, 2023–24, 2026
- National Games
  - Winners (3): 1992, 2010, 2012

== See also ==
- WAPDA Sports Club
