= Football at the 2004 South Asian Games – Men's team squads =

Below are the squads for the 2004 South Asian Games, hosted by Islamabad, Pakistan, which took place between March 28 and April 5, 2004.

== Group A ==
=== Pakistan U23 ===
Chief coach	(China) Wang Xiao He
Assistant coach	(Pakistan) Tariq Lutfi
Assistant coach	(Pakistan) Bilal Butt
Manager	(Pakistan) Ch. Abdul Rasheed
Official	(Pakistan) Arif Gul

GK:

- Jaffar Khan (Army) D.O.B: 20 March 1981
- Muhammad Shahzad (Habib Bank) D.O.B: 25 August 1983

DF:

- Naveed Akram (WAPDA) D.O.B: 16.05.1984
- Muhammad Sharif (Army) D.O.B: 20.04.1981
- Arif Ali (Balochistan) D.O.B: 04.03.1986
- Ejaz Ahmed (Army) D.O.B: 1984
- Mehmood Khan (Balochistan), D.O.B: 20.03.1981
- Muhammad Zahid (Army) D.O.B: 10.10.1981

MF:

- Nasir Iqbal (Army) D.O.B: 15.06.1982
- Zahid Hameed (PTCL) 01.08.1985
- Burhan Ali (PTCL) 25.10.1984
- Attique-ur-Rehman (KRL) 05.05.1984
- Imran Niazi (WAPDA) 17.11.1985
- Arif Mehmood (WAPDA) 09.11.1981
- Qamar Zaman (WAPDA) 15.01.1986

FW:

- Adeel Ahmed (PTCL) 25.11.1983
- Muhammad Essa (PTCL) 20.11.1983
- Shahid Ahmed (PTCL) 01.03.1983
- Mudassar Saeed (KRL) 03.07.1981
- Abdul Aziz (Sindh Government Press) 11.01.1986
- Farooq Shah (SSGC) 19.10.1985

=== Afghanistan U23 ===
Head coach	(Afghanistan) Abdul Rasul Rasekh
Assistant coach	(Afghanistan) Mohammad Aziz Abolfazli
Manager	(Afghanistan) Mohammad Hamed Maiwand
Official	(Afghanistan) Abdul Saboor Walizada

- Abadullah Barak
- Abaseen Atai
- Abdul Ahmad Tanhah
- Abdul Tawab Sultani
- Ahmadullah Ahmadi
- Farid Ahmadi
- Hadi Razai
- Mohammad Aslam Askaryar
- Mohammad Haneef Jabar Khil
- Mohammad Khalid Dilwar
- Mohammad Nasim Hussaini
- Nangialai Sayedi
- Qasim Ali Rahimi
- Rahman Ali Nazari
- Raza Mohammadi
- Raza Razai
- Rozeddin Omidwar
- Syed Hameed
- Shams Uddin Amiri
- Wahidullah Nazari

=== Bangladesh U23 ===
Head coach	(Bangladesh) Shahidur Rahman Shantoo

- Masud Parvez Kaiser
- Rashed Ahmed
- Ashraful Kader Manju
- Abdullah Al Parvez
- Aminul Islam
- Mehedi Hasan Ujjal
- Mustafa Anwar Parvez Babu
- Firoj Mahmud Titu
- Zahid Hasan Ameli
- Monwar Hossain
- Mohammed Sujan
- Ziaur Rahman
- Atiqul Islam Tariq
- Ashraful Karim
- Arman Aziz
- Kamal Hossain
- AKM Harisuzzaman
- Zahidul Hasan Dalim
- Yousuf Ali Khan
- Akram Hossain

=== India U20 ===
Head coach	(India) Aloke Mukherjee
Assistant coach	(India) Satheevan Balan
Goalkeeping coach	(India) Virender Singh
Manager	(India) Rakesh Kumar Bakshi

GK:

- Subhasish Roy Chowdhury (Tata Football Academy)
- Machindra Singh (Punjab)
- Amit Nandy (Bengal)

DF:

- Habibur Rehman Mondal (Tata Football Academy)
- Gurpreet Singh (Tata Football Academy)
- Warundeep Singh (Tata Football Academy)
- Subhas Mondal (Tata Football Academy)
- N. S. Manju (DYS, Karnataka)

MF:

- Gouramangi Singh (Tata Football Academy)
- Malswama (Tata Football Academy)
- Jerry Zirsanga (Tata Football Academy)
- Debabrata Roy (Tata Football Academy)
- Chitrasen Chandam Singh (Tata Football Academy)
- Shylo Malsawmtluanga (East Bengal)
- Naduparambil Pappachan Pradeep (Kerala)

FW:

- Vimal Pariyar (Tata Football Academy)
- Vanlal Rova (Tata Football Academy)
- Sunil Chhetri (Mohun Bagan)
- Sutang Marlanki (Fransa FC, Goa)
- Sampath Kuttymani (Indian Telephone Industries)

== Group B ==
=== Bhutan U23 ===
Head coach	(Bhutan) Kharga Bahadur Basnet
Manager	(Bhutan) Ugyen Wangchuck
Doctor	(Bhutan) Tenzin Duckpa

- Chencho Gyeltshen
- Dorji Khandu
- Gyeltshen
- Singye Jigme
- Kinley Dorji
- Subba Krishna
- Kunzang Wangchuk
- Nawang Dhendup
- Passang Tshering
- Pema Chophel
- Pema Dorji
- Sangay Khandu
- Sonam Tenzin
- Tashi Dorji
- Tashi Jamtsho
- Ugyen Dorji
- Wangchuck

=== Nepal U23 ===
GK:

- Dillip Chhetri (RCT)
- Bikash Malla (Friends Club/ANFA Academy U-20)
- Ritesh Thapa (Three Star Club)

DF:

- Sagar Thapa (Sankata)
- Pralya Rajbhandari (Friends Club/ANFA Academy U-20)
- Umesh Upreti (Manang Marsyangdi Club)
- Janak Singh (Three Star Club),
- Anjan K.C. (Friends Club/ANFA Academy U-20)
- Sanjeev Budathoki (Mahendra Police Club)
- Santosh Shrestha (Waling)

MF:

- Bijaya Gurung (Friends Club/ANFA Academy U-20)
- Pradeep Dangol (Friends Club/ANFA Academy U-20)
- Prabesh Katuwal (Friends Club)
- Raju Katuwal (Mahendra Police Club)
- Vishan Gauchan (Friends Club)
- Naveen Neupane (Manang Marsyangdi Club)

FW:

- Raj Kumar Ghising (Sankata U-17)
- Jibesh Pandey (Sankata),
- Prabin Manandhar (Friends Club/ANFA Academy U-20)

== See also ==
- South Asian Games
- Football at the South Asian Games
