= 2007 Super Football League =

Super Football League
- Season: 2007
- Dates: 20 July 2007 – 9 September 2007
- Champions: Islamabad United; 1st title
- Runner up: Karachi Bazigar
- Matches: 23
- Goals: 101 (4.39 per match)
- Best player: Muhammad Essa (Quetta Zorawar)
- Top goalscorer: Arif Mehmood (8 goals)
- Highest scoring: Tribe FC Peshawar 2–3 Lahore Lajpaals (28 July 2007); Quetta Zorawar 4–1 Islamabad United (9 August 2007)
- Longest winning run: 4 matches Lahore Lajpaals
- Longest unbeaten run: 7 matches Karachi Energy
- Longest winless run: 6 matches Karachi Bazigar
- Longest losing run: 4 matches Tribe FC

The 2007 Super Football League was the first season of the country's franchise-based football league in collaboration between the Pakistan Football Federation and GEO Super. The 2007 season spanned from July 20 to September 9.

== Overview ==
Geo TV Network and the Pakistan Football Federation came together in 2006 and began work on establishing Pakistan's first national inter-city football league to be televised on GEO Super. Geo Super reportedly signed a contract with the PFF for a period of seven years. It ran based on franchise model over a span of two months, and was one of the few televised domestic championship held in the country since its inception.

It was regarded as a parallel new professional top flight league, and for the first time the teams would be city-based and non departmental, in contrast to the Pakistan Premier League, representing Pakistan's five major cities. Players were selected after trials, which took place between June 17–25. The league attracted record crowds at the Peoples Football Stadium in Karachi.

Given the level of interest and big turnout of players for trials, the selection committee, consisting of members of the PFF and Geo TV Network, had their work cut out for them. Over 100 matches were held in different locations. Around 3000 players participated in the trias. In the league, foreign players also participated such as Nigerian Emeka Eliewa.

Islamabad United won by 4–3 on penalties in the final against Karachi Bazigar after a goalless draw. The league attracted record crowds at the Peoples Football Stadium in Karachi.

== Format ==
All matches were played in the Peoples Football Stadium in Karachi. The SFL is divided into two rounds. The first round was a round-robin league format in which the 5 teams would play a total of 8 league matches each, twice against their opponents. After the commencement of the league round, the top 4 teams out of 5 were drawn for a knock-out stage round involving single-legged semi finals with the winners meeting in a final to determine the inaugural Super Football League champion of Pakistan. Three matches, Peshawar vs Karachi (10 August 2007), and Islamabad vs Lahore (11 and 22 August 2007), were postponed due to heavy rain and waterlogged conditions, and later played on rearranged dates.

== Squads ==
Karachi Bazigar	Islamabad United	Quetta Zorawar
1. Sajid Hussain; 2. Akhter Mamol; 3. Misbah ul Hassan; 4. Akbar Ali; 5. Aurangzeb Jr.; 6. Adil Sakhi; 7. Majid Ali; 8. Javed Hamza; 9. Abdul Aziz; 10. Farooq Shah; 11. Naseer Ahmed; 12. Shahzad Hashmi; 13. Shakir Lashari; 14. Muhammad Moosa; 15. Aurangzed Sr.; 16. Ishtiaq Ahmed; 17. Zeeshan Ali; 18. Syed Sultan Ali; 19. Fareed Sadiq; 20. Amir Gul; Head Coach: Siddiq Shaikh	1. Asim Khurshid; 2. Akhter Mamol; 3. Saeed; 4. Kamran Khan; 5. Yasir Sabir; 6. Atiquallah; 7. Sajjad Hussain; 8. Muhammad Qasim; 9. Emeka Aliewa; 10. Mubashir Sanjrani; 11. Muhammad Noor; 12. Raheel Rehman; 13. Ameer Khan; 14. Ghulam Moh-ud-Din; 15. Asim Shahzad; 16. Yasir Afridi; 17. Nasir Shoaib; 18. Hassan Taimur Khan; 19. Fahad Ullah Khan; 20. Tajuddeen; Head Coach: Sajjad Mehmood	1. Ghulam Nabi; 2. Mehmood Khan; 3. Dil Shahid Ali; 4. Noor Mohammad; 5. Aman Ullah; 6. Shahid Ahmed; 7. Zahid Hamid; 8. Agha Raza; 9. Muhammad Essa; 10. Nasrullah; 11. Jahangir Shah; 12. Mohammad Asgher; 13. Masood Ahmed; 14. Jahangir; 15. Waqas Ahmed; 16. Noman Ejaz; 17. Mehdi; 18. Jadid Khan Pathan; 19. Imran Hashmi; 20. Abbas Ali; Head Coach:
Lahore Lajpaals	Tribe FC Peshawar	
1. Muhammad Tariq; 2. Tanveer Ahmed; 3. Muhammad Shahid; 4. Amir Khan; 5. Naveed Akram; 6. Burhan Ali; 7. Mehmood Ahmed; 8. Arif Mehmood; 9. Bashir Ahmed; 10. Zaheer Abbas; 11. Bilal Rafique; 12. Haji Muhammad; 13. Muhammad Luqman; 14. Atif Hussain; 15. Rashid Ali; 16. Abdul Waqas; 17. Ali Ahsan; 18. Abdul Basit; 19. Muhammad Asif; 20. Qamar Ali Chand; Head Coach: Bashir Ahmed	1. Abdul Shakoor; 2. Ataullah; 3. Inam; 4. Banaras; 5. Irfan; 6. Akhtar Munir; 7. Sajjad; 8. Liaqat Ali; 9. Adeel; 10. Attique; 11. Khalid Zaman; 12. Noor ul Haq; 13. Imran Niazi; 14. Aamir; 15. Abid; 16. Siraj Hussain; 17. Arsalan Azam; 18. Fazal Zeeshan; 19. Nadeem Jabran; 20. Wajeh; Head Coach: Qazi Muhammad Asif	

== League round ==
Pos	Team	Pld	W	D	L	GF	GA	GD	Pts	Qualification
1	Lahore Lajpaals	8	6	1	1	15	6	+9	19	Advance to semi-finals
2	Quetta Zorawar	8	5	1	2	12	6	+6	16	Advance to semi-finals
3	Karachi Bazigar	8	4	2	2	10	5	+5	14	Advance to semi-finals
4	Islamabad United	8	1	2	5	7	16	−9	5	Advance to semi-finals
5	Tribe FC Peshawar	8	0	2	6	7	18	−11	2	

Source: (Official website)

=== Fixtures and results ===
20 July 2007

Karachi Bazigar	1–0	Lahore Lajpaals
	Report

People's Football Stadium, Karachi

21 July 2007

Tribe FC Peshawar	1–1	Islamabad United
	Report

People's Football Stadium, Karachi

26 July 2007

Quetta Zorawar	1–0	Tribe FC Peshawar
Jadid (?)	Report

People's Football Stadium, Karachi

27 July 2007

Islamabad United	0–2	Karachi Bazigar
	Report	Zeeshan Ali (?); Lashari (?)

People's Football Stadium, Karachi

28 July 2007

Tribe FC Peshawar	2–3	Lahore Lajpaals
Abid 21' ? 33'	Report	Amir Khan 4' (pen.), 52' (pen.); Mehmood (?)

People's Football Stadium, Karachi

2 August 2007

Karachi Bazigar	0–0	Quetta Zorawar
	Report

People's Football Stadium, Karachi

3 August 2007

Islamabad United	2–1	Tribe FC Peshawar
Tajuddeen 13'; Emeka Aliewa 43'	Report	Hashmi 4'

People's Football Stadium, Karachi

4 August 2007

Lahore Lajpaals	1–0	Quetta Zorawar
Muhammad Asif 20'	Report

People's Football Stadium, Karachi

9 August 2007

Quetta Zorawar	4–1	Islamabad United
Nasrullah 45'; Shahid Ahmed 79'; Essa (?); Jadid (?)	Report	Atiq Ullah 69'

People's Football Stadium, Karachi

16 August 2007

Lahore Lajpaals	4–0	Tribe FC Peshawar
Akram 8'; Mehmood 19', 60', 88'	Report

People's Football Stadium, Karachi

17 August 2007

Karachi Bazigar	2–0	Islamabad United
Shah (?); Lashari 40'	Report

People's Football Stadium, Karachi

18 August 2007

Quetta Zorawar	1–2	Lahore Lajpaals
Jadid 64'	Report	Bashir 54'; Mehmood 62'

People's Football Stadium, Karachi

23 August 2007

Karachi Bazigar	4–1	Tribe FC Peshawar
Aziz (?); Lashari (?); Moosa (?); Akbar Ali (?)	Report	Siraj Hussain (?)

People's Football Stadium, Karachi

24 August 2007

Lahore Lajpaals	3–1	Islamabad United
Mehmood (?); Abdul Waqas (?); Amir Khan 90' (pen.)	Report	Qasim (?)

People's Football Stadium, Karachi

25 August 2007

Quetta Zorawar	2–0	Karachi Bazigar
Essa 15' (?)	Report

People's Football Stadium, Karachi

29 August 2007

Tribe FC Peshawar	1–1	Karachi Bazigar
Niazi 75'	Report	Shah 24'

People's Football Stadium, Karachi

30 August 2007

Islamabad United	1–2	Quetta Zorawar
Afridi 85'	Report	Jadid 6'; Essa 90'

People's Football Stadium, Karachi

31 August 2007

Lahore Lajpaals	1–0	Karachi Bazigar
Zaheer Abbas (?)	Report

People's Football Stadium, Karachi

1 September 2007

Tribe FC Peshawar	1–2	Quetta Zorawar
Niazi 10'	Report	Essa (?), 92'

People's Football Stadium, Karachi

2 September 2007

Islamabad United	1–1	Lahore Lajpaals
Qasim (?)	Report	Atif Hussain (?)

People's Football Stadium, Karachi

== Semi-finals ==
6 September 2007

Lahore Lajpaals	0–0 (aet)	Islamabad United
	Report
Penalties
Amir Khan (penalty scored); Haji Muhammad (penalty scored); Bashir Ahmed (penalty missed); Shahid (penalty missed); Akram (penalty missed); Atif Hussain (penalty missed)	2–3	(penalty missed) Arif Masih; (penalty scored) Afridi; (penalty missed) Kamran; (penalty missed) Sajjad Hussain; (penalty scored) Yasir Sabir; (penalty scored) Ghulam Mohiuddin

People's Football Stadium, Karachi
Referee: Muhammad Iqbal Junior

7 September 2007

Quetta Zorawar	0–0 (aet)	Karachi Bazigar
	Report
Penalties
Essa (penalty scored); Shahid Ahmed (penalty scored); Noor Muhammad (penalty scored); Mehmood Khan (penalty missed); Agha Raza (penalty missed)	3–4	(penalty scored) Abdul Aziz; (penalty scored) Misbah-ul-Hassan; (penalty scored) Shah; (penalty scored) Akhtar Mamol

People's Football Stadium, Karachi
Referee: Khalid Khan

== Final ==
9 September 2007
21:00 PST

Karachi Bazigar	0–0 (aet)	Islamabad United
	Report
Penalties
Abdul Aziz (penalty missed); Misbah-ul-Hassan (penalty scored); Shah (penalty missed); Akhtar Mamol (penalty scored); Ali Akbar (penalty scored)	3–4	(penalty missed) Yasir Sabir; (penalty scored) Kamran; (penalty scored) Nasir Shoaib; (penalty scored) Atiqullah; (penalty scored) Ghulam Mohiuddin

People's Football Stadium, Karachi
Attendance: 15,000
Referee: Jahangir Khan

== Awards ==
Award	Recipient	Club
Top Scorer	Arif Mehmood (8 goals)	Lahore Lajpaals
Player of the Tournament	Muhammad Essa	Quetta Zorawar
Fair Play Award		Lahore Lajpaals
