= 2010 Super Football League =

Super Football League
- Season: 2010
- Dates: 11 June – 31 July 2010
- Champions: Karachi Energy; 1st title
- Runner up: Quetta Zorawar
- Matches: 23
- Goals: 43 (1.87 per match)
- Best player: Muhammad Riaz (Islamabad United)
- Top goalscorer: Muhammad Rasool (6 goals)
- Best goalkeeper: Muhammad Omar (Karachi Energy)
- Highest scoring: Karachi Energy 2–2 Islamabad United (11 June 2010); Tribe FC Peshawar 2–2 Islamabad United (13 June 2010); Karachi Energy 3–1 Tribe FC (27 June 2010); Quetta Zorawar 2–2 Lahore Lajpaals (9 July 2010)
- Longest winning run: 3 matches Karachi Energy
- Longest unbeaten run: 7 matches Karachi Energy
- Longest winless run: 6 matches Tribe FC
- Longest losing run: 3 matches Tribe FC

The 2010 Super Football League was the second season of the country's franchise-based football league in collaboration between the Pakistan Football Federation and GEO Super. The 2010 season spanned from 11 June to 31 July.

== Overview ==
Due to a lack of long-term support from Pakistan Football Federation, the second edition of the Super Football League was held in summer 2010 after a gap three years since its inception in 2007, when KESC stepped in to support the venture with another SFL season and merited a second attempt in 2010. KESC also ran the Karachi Energy team, which was renamed from Karachi Bazigar. All five teams were also asked to include six players under the age of 20 in their 22-player squads to promote youth football.

Players for each teams were selected through trials. Qayyum Sports Complex, Peshawar, hosted the trials for Tribes FC from May 18–20 with Nasir Ismail, Gohar Zaman, Najeeb Ullah Najmi and Shakoor as the coaches. The selection process to form Quetta Zorawar was held at Yazdhan Khan High School, Quetta, from May 20–22 under Akhtar Mohiuddin, Mohammad Dawood, Mohammad Karim and Azizullah. Islamabad FA hosted trials for the Islamabad United team at the PTCL Ground where Sajjad Mahmood, Shaukat Ali, Haji Abdul Sattar as coaches from May 21–23. The Lahore Lajpaals team trials were held at the Punjab Stadium, Lahore, from May 24–26 under the supervision of Shahzad Anwar, Mohammad Habib, Tanveer Ahmed and Asghar Khan Anjum. The fifth and final trials were held at Karachi's Peoples Sports Complex from May 27–29 with Hassan Baloch, Zafar Iqbal, Saleem Patni and Zahid Taj as the coaches. The Pakistan Football Federation also made mandatory for all the captains of the teams to wrap captains band around their arm, in contrast to the previous season. Matches were also held under floodlights.

Karachi Energy won the title after defeating Quetta Zorawar in the final. The winners were awarded Rs 780,000 prize money. The runner-ups Quetta Zorawar earned a prize money of Rs 390,000. Top scorer Muhammad Rasool received Rs50,000 as prize money. Muhammad Riaz of Islamabad United was declared best player, Muhammad Omar of Karachi Energy was declared as best goalkeeper.

However, the league did not continue because the organisers and sponsors reportedly did not want to work with the Pakistan Football Federation again. The reason was largely because Geo Super conducted it purely for commercial reasons, while the Pakistan Football Federation failed to cash in on it for the long term betterment of football in the country.

== Format ==
All matches were played in the Peoples Football Stadium in Karachi. The SFL is divided into two rounds. The first round was a round-robin league format in which the 5 teams would play a total of 8 league matches each, twice against their opponents. After the commencement of the league round, the top 4 teams out of 5 were drawn for a knock-out stage round involving single-legged semi finals with the winners meeting in a final to determine the inaugural Super Football League champion of Pakistan.

== Squads ==
Source: Geo Super

Karachi Energy	Islamabad United	Quetta Zorawar
1. Muhammad Omar (GK); 13. Abdul Aziz (GK); 22. Amir Gul (GK); 2. Aurangzeb (Jr.) (DF); 19. Ubaid (DF); 4. Aurangzeb (Sr.) (DF); 5. Akbar Ali (DF); 16. Misbah ul Hassan (DF); 12. Ismail (DF); 3. Akhtar Mammal (DF); 14. Imran Abdullah (MF); 18. Shahzad Hashmi (MF); 6. Zulfiqar Shah (MF); 7. Farhan (MF); 8. Abdul Aziz (MF); 10. Muhammad Essa (MF); 17. Saddam Hussain (FW); 11. Shakir Lashari (FW); 15. Zafar Majeed (FW); 20. Abdul Rehman (FW); 21. Khuda Bux (FW); 9. Muhammad Rasool (FW); Head Coach: Hassan Baloch	1. Khalid Khan (GK); 22. Asim Khurshid (GK); 4. Kamran Khan (DF); 3. Yasir Sabir (DF); 5. Muhammad Ramzan (DF); 2. Mustaqeen Khan (DF); 6. Rai Akmal Shahzad (DF); 18. Muhammad Saqib (DF); 11. Saleh Khan (MF); 7. Yasir Afridi (MF); 8. Atiq Ullah (MF); 12. Nasir Jameel (MF); 13. Muhammad Tauseef (MF); 14. Muhammad Riaz (MF); 15. Saeed Sher (MF); 16. Bilal Arshad Butt (FW); 10. Muhammad Qasim (FW); 23. Baqar Qasim Ali Hassan (FW); 9. Hikmatullah (FW); 19. Fahadullah Khan (FW); 20. Bashir Ahmed (FW); 21. Ali Naqvi (FW); Head Coach: Sajjad Mehmood	22. Jahangir Khan (GK); 1. Ghulam Nabi (GK); 3. Asghar (DF); 5. Shahid (DF); 4. Manzoor (DF); 12. Ehsan Ullah (DF); 2. Jahanzeb (DF); 20. Abdul Qadir (DF); 18. Noor Mohammad (DF); 19. Mahmood Khan (Sr.) (MF); 6. Mehmood (MF); 8. Mehmood Khan (Jr.) (MF); 10. Nasrullah Khan (MF); 9. Jadid Khan Pathan (MF); 13. Saad Ullah (MF); 21. Jabbar (MF); 7. Zahid Hamid (MF); 11. Kaleemullah Khan (FW); 16. Zainullah (FW); 17. Imran Hashmi (FW); 15. Shahid Ahmed (FW); 14. Riaz Ahmed (FW); Head Coach: Akhtar Mohiuddin
Lahore Lajpaals	Tribe FC Peshawar	
1. Bilal Rafiq (GK); 22. Muzammil Hussain (GK); 2. Muhammad Shahid (DF); 3. Haider Ali (DF); 13. Ali Ahsan (DF); 14. Tanveer Shahid (DF); 5. Naveed Akram (DF); 4. Haji Muhammad (DF); 15. Ghazanfar Abbas (DF); 16. Muhammad Asif (DF); 17. Muhammad Ahmed (DF); 7. Fakhar Hayat (MF); 8. Muhammad Adil (MF); 18. Faisal Iqbal (MF); 9. Rashid Ali (MF); 6. Muzaffar Ali (MF); 20. Naeemullah (MF); 10. Arif Mehmood (FW); 21. Asif Mehmood (FW); 11. Ghulam Abbas (FW); 12. Muhammad Asif (FW); 19. Asim Mansoor (FW); Head Coach: Shahzad Anwar	1. Saqib Hanif (GK); 22. Naveed Khan (GK); 2. Gul Draz (DF); 3. Aamir Siddique (Jr.) (DF); 4. Alamgir Khan (DF); 5. Waqas Ahmed (Sr.) (DF); 6. Mohammad Arshad (MF); 7. Adeel Ahmed (MF); 8. Badshah Gul (MF); 9. Imran Niazi (MF); 10. Safiullah Khan (FW); 11. Qamar Zaman (FW); 12. Shahid Muneer (DF); 13. Aamir Khan (DF); 14. Aamir Sarwar (DF); 15. Abrar Ullah (DF); 16. Shah Nawaz Khan (MF); 17. Sohail Khan (FW); 18. Rashid Ali (FW); 19. Umar Iqbal (FW); 20. Mohammad Naeem (FW); 21. Asad Ullah Khan (FW); Head Coach: Mohammad Bashir	

== League round ==
Pos	Team	Pld	W	D	L	GF	GA	GD	Pts	Qualification
1	Karachi Energy	8	4	3	1	12	7	+5	15	Advance to semi-finals
2	Quetta Zorawar	8	3	3	2	9	6	+3	12	Advance to semi-finals
3	Lahore Lajpaals	8	3	3	2	9	7	+2	12	Advance to semi-finals
4	Islamabad United	8	1	4	3	5	9	−4	7	Advance to semi-finals
5	Tribe FC Peshawar	8	1	3	4	6	12	−6	6	

Source: (Official website)

=== Fixtures and results ===
11 June 2010

Islamabad United	2–2	Karachi Energy
Akbar Ali 59' (o.g.); Muhammad Ramzan 79' (pen.)	Report	Lashari 20'; Abdul Aziz 41'

People's Football Stadium, Karachi

12 June 2010

Quetta Zorawar	3–0	Lahore Lajpaals
Nasrullah 19' (pen.); Jadid 60'; Mehmood 73'	Report

People's Football Stadium, Karachi

13 June 2010

Tribe FC Peshawar	2–2	Islamabad United
Ibrar Ullah 39'; Sohail Khan 50'	Report	Afridi 6'; Qasim 10'

People's Football Stadium, Karachi

17 June 2010

Quetta Zorawar	1–0	Tribe FC Peshawar
Jadid 38'	Report

People's Football Stadium, Karachi

18 June 2010

Lahore Lajpaals	0–0	Islamabad United
	Report

People's Football Stadium, Karachi

20 June 2010

Karachi Energy	1–0	Quetta Zorawar
Saddam 21'	Report

People's Football Stadium, Karachi
Referee: Rana Naseer

25 June 2010

Tribe FC Peshawar	0–3	Lahore Lajpaals
	Report	Muhammad Asif 74'; Ghulam Abbas 81', 88'

People's Football Stadium, Karachi

26 June 2010

Islamabad United	1–0	Quetta Zorawar
Fahadullah 53'	Report

People's Football Stadium, Karachi

27 June 2010

Karachi Energy	3–1	Tribe FC Peshawar
Rehman 2'; Rasool 12', 56'	Report	Adeel 6'

People's Football Stadium, Karachi

02 July 2010

Karachi Energy	1–0	Lahore Lajpaals
Saddam 19'	Report

People's Football Stadium, Karachi

03 July 2010

Islamabad United	0–1	Tribe FC Peshawar
		Niazi 90'

People's Football Stadium, Karachi

04 July 2010

Quetta Zorawar	2–1	Karachi Energy
Kaleemullah 29'; Hashmi 81'		Rasool 27'

People's Football Stadium, Karachi

09 July 2010

Lahore Lajpaals	2–2	Quetta Zorawar
Ghulam Abbas 20'; Muhammad Asim 85'		Nasrullah 38', 44'

People's Football Stadium, Karachi

10 July 2010

Karachi Energy	2–0	Islamabad United

People's Football Stadium, Karachi

11 July 2010

Lahore Lajpaals	1–0	Tribe FC Peshawar
Haji Muhammad (?)	Report

People's Football Stadium, Karachi

16 July 2010

Quetta Zorawar	0–0	Islamabad United

People's Football Stadium, Karachi

17 July 2010

Tribe FC Peshawar	1–1	Karachi Energy

People's Football Stadium, Karachi

18 July 2010

Lahore Lajpaals	2–0	Islamabad United

People's Football Stadium, Karachi

23 July 2010

Tribe FC Peshawar	1–1	Quetta Zorawar
Sohail Khan (?)	Report	Kaleemullah (?)

People's Football Stadium, Karachi

24 July 2010

Lahore Lajpaals	1–1	Karachi Energy
Mohammad Asim 90'	Report	Khuda Bakhsh 88' (pen.)

People's Football Stadium, Karachi

== Semi-finals ==
27 July 2010

Lahore Lajpaals	1–2	Quetta Zorawar
Adil 3'	Report	Kaleemullah 26', 33'

People's Football Stadium, Karachi

28 July 2010

Karachi Energy	1–1 (a.e.t.) (4–2 pens.)	Islamabad United
Essa 91' (pen.)	Report	Muhammad Ramzan 120' (pen.)

People's Football Stadium, Karachi

== Final ==
31 July 2010

Quetta Zorawar	0–1	Karachi Energy
	Report	Rasool 83'

People's Football Stadium, Karachi

== Top scorers ==
Player	Club	Goals
Muhammad Rasool	Karachi Energy	6
Nasrullah Khan	Quetta Zorawar	3
Ghulam Abbas	Lahore Lajpaals	3
Asim Mansoor	Lahore Lajpaals	3
Jadid Khan Pathan	Quetta Zorawar	2
Muhammad Qasim	Islamabad United	2
Saddam Hussain	Karachi Energy	2
Kaleemullah Khan	Quetta Zorawar	2
Sohail Khan	Tribe FC Peshawar	2

== Awards ==
Award	Recipient	Club
Top Scorer	Muhammad Rasool	Karachi Energy
Player of the Tournament	Muhammad Riaz	Islamabad United
Best Goalkeeper	Muhammad Omar	Karachi Energy
Best match commissioner	Iqbal Junior	
Best referee	Khurram Shehzad	
