= Football at the 2005 Islamic Solidarity Games – Men's team squads =

The football tournament at the 2005 Islamic Solidarity Games took from 9 to 20 April 2005. Each participating nation's football association selected 21 players for the tournament.

== Group B ==
=== Mali U23 ===
Coach: Mory Goïta

No.	Pos.	Player	Date of birth (age)	Caps	Goals	Club
	GK	Cheick Bathily	10 October 1982 (aged 22)			(Malian Football Federation) Djoliba AC
		...				
	DF	Moussa Coulibaly	19 May 1981 (aged 23)			(Algerian Football Federation) MC Alger
	DF	Boubacar Koné	21 August 1984 (aged 20)			(Malian Football Federation) AS Bamako
	DF	Mohamed Sissoko	22 January 1985 (aged 20)			(Royal Spanish Football Federation) Valencia CF
		...				
	MF	Jimmy Kébé	19 January 1984 (aged 21)			(French Football Federation) RC Lens
		...				
	FW	Mamadou Diallo	17 April 1982 (aged 22)			(French Football Federation) FC Nantes
	FW	Tenema N'Diaye	13 February 1981 (aged 24)			(United Arab Emirates Football Association) Al Wahda FC
		...				

== Group C ==
=== Algeria U21 ===
Coach: Abdelhak Benchikha

No.	Pos.	Player	Date of birth (age)	Caps	Goals	Club
	GK	Mohamed Lamine Zemmamouche	19 March 1985 (aged 20)			(Algerian Football Federation) USM Alger
	GK	Nabil Mazari	19 March 1985 (aged 20)			(Algerian Football Federation) JS Kabylie
	GK	Azzedine Doukha	5 August 1986 (aged 18)			(Algerian Football Federation) ASO Chlef
	DF	Farid Cheklam	21 September 1984 (aged 20)			(Algerian Football Federation) ASO Chlef
	DF	Adlène Boutnef				(Algerian Football Federation) CR Belouizdad
	DF	Sofiane Bengoureïne	10 October 1984 (aged 20)			(Algerian Football Federation) USM Bel-Abbès
	DF	Kheireddine Zarabi	7 July 1984 (aged 20)			(Algerian Football Federation) RC Kouba
	DF	Benamar Belabbas	20 April 1985 (aged 19)			(French Football Federation) RCO Agde
	MF	Abdelmadjid Benatia	12 December 1984 (aged 20)			(Algerian Football Federation) MC Oran
	MF	Fahem Ouslati	14 March 1986 (aged 19)			(Algerian Football Federation) CR Belouizdad
	MF	Hocine Metref	1 January 1984 (aged 21)			(Algerian Football Federation) USM Alger
	MF	Lazhar Hadj Aïssa	23 March 1984 (aged 21)			(Algerian Football Federation) ES Sétif
	MF	Yacine Si Kaddour	25 June 1986 (aged 18)			(Algerian Football Federation) MC Alger
	MF	Nacereddine Khoualed	16 April 1986 (aged 18)			(Algerian Football Federation) US Biskra
	MF	Sofiane Harkat	26 January 1984 (aged 21)			(Algerian Football Federation) USM El Harrach
	MF	Bouazza Feham	11 April 1986 (aged 18)			(Algerian Football Federation) ASM Oran
	MF	Tayeb Berramla	6 January 1985 (aged 20)			(Algerian Football Federation) ASM Oran
	FW	Toufik Chaïb	16 January 1984 (aged 21)			(Algerian Football Federation) MC Oran
	FW	Sofiane Hanitser	20 October 1984 (aged 20)			(Algerian Football Federation) ASM Oran
	FW	Mohamed Boussefiane	18 January 1985 (aged 20)			(Algerian Football Federation) RC Kouba
	FW	Amine Boukhlouf	30 January 1984 (aged 21)			(Algerian Football Federation) MSP Batna
	FW	Boubeker Bellil	10 February 1986 (aged 19)			(Algerian Football Federation) USM Aïn Beïda

== Group D ==
=== Malaysia ===
Coach: Bertalan Bicskei

No.	Pos.	Player	Date of birth (age)	Caps	Goals	Club
	GK	Azizon Abdul Kadir	10 June 1980 (aged 24)			(Football Association of Malaysia) Negeri Sembilan
	GK	Syamsuri Mustafa	6 February 1981 (aged 24)			(Football Association of Malaysia) Terengganu
	DF	Durahim Jamaluddin	13 February 1981 (aged 24)			(Football Association of Malaysia) Perlis FA
	DF	Nor Fazly Alias	31 May 1981 (aged 23)			(Football Association of Malaysia) Terengganu
	DF	Kaironnisam Sahabudin	10 May 1979 (aged 25)			(Football Association of Malaysia) Perlis FA
	DF	Lim Chan Yew	14 October 1978 (aged 26)			(Football Association of Malaysia) MPPJ Selangor
	DF	Nazrulerwan Makmor	4 May 1980 (aged 24)			(Football Association of Malaysia) Selangor
	DF	Ahmad Tharmini Saiban	27 August 1978 (aged 26)			(Football Association of Malaysia) Selangor
	MF	Shukor Adan	24 September 1979 (aged 25)			(Football Association of Malaysia) Selangor
	MF	Idris Abdul Karim	29 November 1976 (aged 28)			(Football Association of Malaysia) Negeri Sembilan
	MF	Rezal Zambery	10 October 1978 (aged 26)			(Football Association of Malaysia) Negeri Sembilan
	MF	Ivan Yusoff	13 May 1982 (aged 22)			(Football Association of Malaysia) Perlis FA
	MF	Mohd Arsyah Ayob	26 August 1980 (aged 24)			(Football Association of Malaysia) Sabah
	MF	Wong Sai Kong	19 September 1978 (aged 26)			(Football Association of Malaysia) Selangor Public Bank
	FW	Liew Kit Kong	6 January 1979 (aged 26)			(Football Association of Malaysia) Sabah
	FW	Safee Sali	29 January 1984 (aged 21)			(Football Association of Malaysia) Sarawak FA
	FW	Fadzli Saari	1 January 1983 (aged 22)			(Football Association of Malaysia) Pahang FA
	FW	Mohamad Nor Ismail	20 August 1982 (aged 22)			(Football Association of Malaysia) Johor
	FW	Faizal Esahar	10 August 1977 (aged 27)			(Football Association of Malaysia) Penang FA
		Mat Saiful Bin Mohamad				(Football Association of Malaysia)
		Anisfar Donbin Ahmad				(Football Association of Malaysia)
		Khairol Zal Azmie Bin Zahinuden				(Football Association of Malaysia)

=== Morocco B ===
Coach: Abdelghani Bennaceri

No.	Pos.	Player	Date of birth (age)	Caps	Goals	Club
	GK	Ismail Kouha	12 April 1983 (aged 21)			(Royal Moroccan Football Federation) Raja Casablanca
	GK	Younes Jalil	12 June 1978 (aged 26)			(Royal Moroccan Football Federation)
	GK	Mohamed Bestara	24 May 1980 (aged 24)			(Royal Moroccan Football Federation)
	DF	Abderrahim Chkilit	14 February 1976 (aged 29)			(Royal Moroccan Football Federation) Maghreb of Fez
	DF	Tarik Miri	7 November 1977 (aged 27)			(Royal Moroccan Football Federation) Olympique Khouribga
	DF	Amine Trafeh	19 May 1979 (aged 25)			(Royal Moroccan Football Federation)
	DF	Khalid Bakhouch				(Royal Moroccan Football Federation)
	DF	Mustapha El Haddad	15 July 1979 (aged 25)			(Royal Moroccan Football Federation)
	DF	Zakaria Zerouali	24 May 1978 (aged 26)			(Royal Moroccan Football Federation) Mouloudia Oujda
	DF	Talal El Karkouri	8 July 1976 (aged 28)			(The Football Association) Charlton Athletic
	DF	El Houssaine Ouchla	1 December 1970 (aged 34)			(Royal Moroccan Football Federation) FAR Rabat
	DF	Mohamed Reda Mokhtari	23 June 1977 (aged 27)			(Royal Moroccan Football Federation) FAR Rabat
	MF	Issam Erraki	5 January 1981 (aged 24)			(Royal Moroccan Football Federation) Stade Marocain
	MF	Merouane Zemmama	7 October 1983 (aged 21)			(Royal Moroccan Football Federation) Raja Casablanca
	MF	Salaheddine Aqqal	22 August 1984 (aged 20)			(Royal Moroccan Football Federation) Olympique Khouribga
	MF	Abdessamad Rafik	8 April 1982 (aged 23)			(Royal Moroccan Football Federation) Olympique Khouribga
	MF	Hicham Jouaya	30 September 1981 (aged 23)			(Royal Moroccan Football Federation)
	MF	Adil Lotfi	9 January 1979 (aged 26)			(Royal Moroccan Football Federation) FAR Rabat
	FW	Mounir El Hamdaoui	14 July 1984 (aged 20)			(The Football Association) Tottenham Hotspur
		Imad Ait Aziz				(Royal Moroccan Football Federation)
		Mohamed Lamrini				(Royal Moroccan Football Federation)

=== Pakistan ===
Coach: Tariq Lutfi

No.	Pos.	Player	Date of birth (age)	Caps	Goals	Club
	GK	Jaffar Khan	20 March 1981 (aged 24)			(Pakistan Football Federation) Pakistan Army
	GK	Muhammad Shahzad	25 August 1980 (aged 24)			(Pakistan Football Federation) HBL
	DF	Muhammad Shahid	10 November 1984 (aged 20)			(Pakistan Football Federation) WAPDA
	DF	Mehmood Khan	20 March 1981 (aged 24)			(Pakistan Football Federation) National Bank
	DF	Muhammad Imran	15 November 1985 (aged 19)			(Pakistan Football Federation) PTCL
	DF	Aurangzeb				(Pakistan Football Federation)
	DF	Tanveer Ahmed	15 April 1976 (aged 28)			(Pakistan Football Federation) WAPDA
	DF	Yasir Sabir	10 October 1985 (aged 19)			(Pakistan Football Federation) PTCL
	DF	Ijaz Ahmed	30 November 1983 (aged 21)			(Pakistan Football Federation) Pakistan Army
	MF	Imran Niazi	17 November 1985 (aged 19)			(Pakistan Football Federation) WAPDA
	MF	Zahid Hameed	1 August 1985 (aged 19)			(Pakistan Football Federation) WAPDA
	MF	Atiqur Rehman	5 May 1984 (aged 20)			(Pakistan Football Federation) KRL
	MF	Mohammad Zahid				(Pakistan Football Federation)
	FW	Muhammad Essa	20 November 1983 (aged 21)			(Pakistan Football Federation) Afghan Chaman
	FW	Arif Mehmood	21 June 1983 (aged 21)			(Pakistan Football Federation) WAPDA
	FW	Farooq Shah	19 October 1985 (aged 19)			(Pakistan Football Federation) National Bank
	FW	Abdul Aziz	11 January 1986 (aged 19)			(Pakistan Football Federation) National Bank
	FW	Imran Hussain	10 March 1981 (aged 24)			(Pakistan Football Federation) Pakistan Army
	FW	Naveed Akram	10 May 1984 (aged 20)			(Pakistan Football Federation) WAPDA
	FW	Shahid Ahmed	20 November 1983 (aged 21)			(Pakistan Football Federation) PTCL
