= Nasir Iqbal (footballer) =

Pakistani footballer (1982–2018)

Personal information
- Date of birth: 15 June 1982
- Place of birth: Samundri, Pakistan
- Date of death: 12 January 2018 (aged 35)
- Place of death: Samundri, Pakistan
- Position: Midfielder

Senior career*
Years	Team	Apps	(Gls)
- Pakistan Army

International career
2004	Pakistan U23		
- * Club domestic league appearances and goals

Nasir Iqbal (15 June 1982 – 12 January 2018) was a Pakistani footballer who played as a midfielder. He was part of the squad which won the 2004 South Asian Games with Pakistan. He also represented the Pakistan Army departmental team in Pakistan's domestic football.

== Early life ==
Iqbal hailed from Samundri in the district of Faisalabad.

== Club career ==
Iqbal started playing football at primary school and college, from where he was picked up by the Pakistan Army departmental team. In the 2003 National Football Championship, Iqbal scored a goal in the quarterfinals against Sindh Red in a 1–0 victory, which helped lead the Army team to the finals where they eventually fell against WAPDA on penalties. After an injury to his left knee at the Pakistan national team cap, a while after he had won the 2004 South Asian Games on international level, he was dropped from the club.

== International career ==
=== 2001 England Tour ===
In 2001, Iqbal was called by the Pakistan national team during their tour to England, where they played against Bury and Coventry. On a mysterious note, Iqbal went missing from the squad and failed to turn up for the match a day before at Bury's Gigg Lane on 21 March. He disappeared from outside the ground as his teammates gathered for a press conference. The local police and Bury chairman Terry Robinson confirmed they were made aware of the player's disappearance and that representatives of the Pakistani national team were trying to trace him. It was understood that he went to see his relatives in Bolton after sustaining an injury during the training.

=== 2004 South Asian Games ===
In 2004, Iqbal was called by the Pakistan under-23 national team for the 2004 South Asian Games, where he helped Pakistan win the gold medal.

=== Injury ===
He also toured Thailand with the national team. Iqbal eventually injured his left knee during a national team camp, which caused him to get dropped from the team.

== Post-retirement ==
During more than a decade since Iqbal played a competitive match, he continued to train youngsters at his village and making appearances at local matches as a guest.

== Death ==
Iqbal died on the morning of 12 January 2018, after a road accident while transporting sugarcane to Gojra Sugar Mills at his hometown in Samundri near Faisalabad. He left behind a five-year-old daughter and twin boys.

=== Aftermath ===
"It was the injury that hurt him a great deal. He came in, impressed, but unfortunately it was all short lived. He later quit Army too."

— Jaffar Khan on Iqbal's death.

The Pakistan Football Federation (PFF) was criticised as it did not show any interest, nor contacted Iqbal's family or put a statement out announcing the death.

Iqbal's family equally did not feel the need to appeal anything. The media also showed lack on coverage on Iqbal's demise.

Iqbal's teammate and former national team captain Jaffar Khan expressed deep sorrow and condolence over the demise of Iqbal.

== Honours ==
Pakistan Army

- National Football Championship runner-up: 2003

Pakistan U23

- South Asian Games: 2004
