= Muhammad Iqbal Wazir =

Pakistani politician

Provincial Minister of Relief & Rehabilitation Khyber Pakhtunkhwa
- In office 2019 – 18 January 2023
- Governor: Shah Farman; Haji Ghulam Ali
- Chief Minister: Mehmood Khan

Member of the Provincial Assembly of Khyber Pakhtunkhwa
- Incumbent
- Assumed office 29 February 2024
- Constituency: PK-103 (North Waziristan-I)
- In office 27 August 2019 – 22 Juanry 2023
- Constituency: PK-111 (North Waziristan-I)

Personal details
- Party: PTI-P (2023–present)
- Other political affiliations: PTI (2019–2023)

Muhammad Iqbal Wazir is a Pakistani politician who was a member of the Provincial Assembly of Khyber Pakhtunkhwa from August 2019 to January 2023.

== Political career ==
Wazir contested the 2019 Khyber Pakhtunkhwa provincial election on 20 July 2019 from constituency PK-111 (North Waziristan-I) on the ticket of Pakistan Tehreek-e-Insaf. He won the election by the majority of 912 votes over the runner up Maulana Samiuddin of Jamiat Ulema-e-Islam. He garnered 10,200 votes while Samiuddin received 9,288 votes.
