= Mahmud Khan =

Mahmud Khan may refer to:

- Mahmud Khan, Iran, a village in Khuzestan Province, Iran
- Mahmud Khan (Moghul Khan) (1462–1508), Khan of Tashkent and of the Moghuls of western Moghulistan
- Shah Mahmud Khan (1890–1959), Prime Minister of Afghanistan, 1946–1953
- Mahmud Khan I, 18th-century ruler of Kalat in what is now the Balochistan province of Pakistan
- Sayyed Mahmud Khan (died 1573), Mughal general
- Mahmud Khan of Bengal, 17th-century Bengali nobleman
- Mahmud Shah III of Gujarat (born Mahmud Khan), 16th-century ruler of the Gujarat Sultanate in India; r. 1537–1554

== See also ==
- Mahmood Khan, Pakistani politician
- Mehmood Khan (disambiguation)
