= Imran Hashmi =

Imran Hashmi may refer to:

- Emraan Hashmi (born 1979), Indian film actor
- Imran Hashmi (footballer) (born 1989), Pakistani footballer
