= Kamran Khan (footballer) =

Pakistani footballer (born 1985)

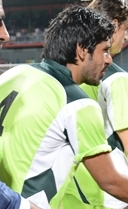
- Khan with Pakistan in 2013

Personal information
- Date of birth: 23 March 1985 (age 41)
- Place of birth: Islamabad, Pakistan
- Height: 1.77 m (5 ft 10 in)
- Position: Center-back

Youth career
- Mehran

Senior career*
Years	Team	Apps	(Gls)
2003–2016	Khan Research Laboratories		

International career
2011–2013	Pakistan	13	(0)
- * Club domestic league appearances and goals

Kamran Khan (born 23 March 1985) is a Pakistani former footballer who played as a centre-back for the national team.

== Club career ==
=== Mehran ===
Khan began his career with Mehran FC in the Islamabad A-League, before being picked up by Khan Research Laboratories.

=== Khan Research Laboratories ===
Throughout his career of 13 years played for Khan Research Laboratories, Khan won five league titles and six National Cup with the club. He was a member of the team which reached the 2013 AFC President's Cup final, after falling to Turkmen club Balkan FT by 0–1 in the final. He also captained the team.

Khan also played in the Super Football League. He was set for a stint in the Nepali Martyr's Memorial A-Division League like Naveed Akram and Mehmood Ali before him, however scheduling issues ultimately thwarted his departure.

After his retirement in 2016, Khan along with Samar Ishaq joined KRL's coaching panel as assistant coaches.

== International career ==
Khan was selected during the tour of Bahrain under Salman Sharida in 2006, and the 2008 AFC Challenge Cup Qualifiers. He made his debut in the 2011 SAFF Championship where he won his first cap against Bangladesh.

He was called again by the senior team in February 2013, making two appearances in both two-match friendlies against Nepal, both ending in a 1–0 victory for Pakistan. He them played in a two-match tour against Maldives in the same month. He made his last appearance in the 2013 SAFF Championship against India.

== Career statistics ==
=== International ===
Appearances and goals by year and competition
National team	Year	Apps	Goals
Pakistan	2011	3	0
Pakistan	2012	1	0
Pakistan	2013	9	0
Total		13	0

== Honours ==
=== Khan Research Laboratories ===
- Pakistan Premier League: 2009–10, 2011–12, 2012–13, 2013–14
- Pakistan National Football Challenge Cup: 2009, 2010, 2011, 2012, 2015, 2016
- AFC President's Cup Runner-up: 2013
