= Bhutan national under-23 football team =

National association football team

Bhutan U-23
- Nickname(s): Druk Eleven; Druk Yul; Dragon Boys
- Association: Bhutan Football Federation
- Confederation: AFC (Asia)
- Sub-confederation: SAFF (South Asia)
- Head coach: Chencho Dorji
- Home stadium: Changlimithang Stadium
- FIFA code: BHU
First colours	Second colours

First international
- Nepal 0–0 Bhutan (Rawalpindi, Pakistan; 27 March 2004)

Biggest win
- Chinese Taipei 1–3 Bhutan (Amman, Jordan; 9 September 2025)

Biggest defeat
- Jordan 11–0 Bhutan (Amman, Jordan; 3 September 2025)

South Asian Games
- Appearances: 5 (first in 2004)
- Best result: 2019 (runners-up)

The Bhutan national under-23 football team represents Bhutan in men's international under-23 football. The team is controlled by the governing body for football in Bhutan, the Bhutan Football Federation, which is currently a member of the Asian Football Federation and the regional body the South Asian Football Federation. Bhutan have never attempted to qualify for the Olympic Games and their competitive matches have been restricted solely to the South Asian Games, where they made their debut in 2004.

== History ==
Bhutan made their debut at the 9th South Asian Federation Games in 2004. The senior national team had previously competed on multiple occasions in the football tournaments of the South Asian Games, but this was the first time that the tournament was restricted to under-23 teams. The tournament was originally scheduled for 2001, but was cancelled due to the conflict in neighbouring Afghanistan. It was rescheduled for 2003, but Bhutan withdrew. This time, due to the war in Iraq, the tournament was postponed for a second time but was rescheduled a second time for 2004, which Bhutan re-entered. Drawn in a three team group including Nepal and Sri Lanka (following the Maldives' withdrawal), an opening 0–0 draw with Nepal was a positive start. With Sri Lanka beating both Bhutan and Nepal 1–0 in the remaining two group games, Bhutan finished with an identical record to Nepal, but progressed to the knockout rounds winning the toss of a coin. A 4–1 loss to India in the semi-finals, with Pema Chophel scoring the team's first ever goal, saw them face Sri Lanka again in the bronze medal play off match. This time they produced a better performance drawing 0–0 after sudden death extra time, but ultimately lost 3–2 in the resulting penalty shoot out to finish in fourth place overall.

Their next international fixtures were in the 2006 South Asian Games. This time they were less successful. Drawn in a group with Sri Lanka, Pakistan national under-23 football team and the Maldives, Bhutan were eliminated after losing all three of their games: 1–0 against the Maldives and 4–0 against both Pakistan and Sri Lanka to return home without scoring a goal.

There was a four-year gap this time between editions of the South Asian Games, but Bhutan sent their under-23 team to Bangladesh in 2010. Again they were drawn in a four team group, this time with Bangladesh, Nepal and the Maldives, and again they were eliminated following three consecutive losses: 1–0 versus the Maldives, 4–0 versus Bangladesh and then 2–0 versus Nepal to return home for a second time in a row without scoring a goal.

Bhutan's next, and to date most recent series of matches was in 2016, again at the South Asian Games. This time, they were drawn in a three team group, again playing matches against Bangladesh and Nepal. they lost their first match 5–0 to Nepal, to date their heaviest defeat, though they rallied in their final match to draw 1–1 with Bangladesh, and in doing so score only their second ever goal and their first in twelve years through Jigme Dorji. However, this was not enough to seal progression to the knockout stages as Bangladesh beat Nepal in their final group game to claim second place and Bhutan were eliminated.

== Recent results and upcoming fixtures ==
=== 2026 ===
25 March 2026 Friendly	Bhutan	v	Tajikistan	Yupia, India
––:–– IST				Stadium: Golden Jubilee Stadium

28 March 2026 Friendly	India	v	Bhutan	Yupia, India
––:–– IST				Stadium: Golden Jubilee Stadium

== Current squad ==
The following squad was selected for the 2016 South Asian Games:

No.	Pos.	Player	Date of birth (age)	Caps	Goals	Club
1	GK	Tshering Dendup	4 April 1994 (age 32)			(Bhutan Football Federation) Yeedzin
21	GK	Gyaltshen Zangpo				
13	GK	Tobgay				
2	DF	Kinley Penjor				
4	DF	Jigme Dorji	26 February 1995 (age 31)			
5	DF	Tenzing Dorji				
6	DF	Chimi Dorji (Captain)	22 December 1993 (age 32)			(Bhutan Football Federation) Druk Star
8	DF	Nima Wangdi	6 December 1998 (age 27)			
20	DF	Choki Wangchuk	2 February 1998 (age 28)			
9	MF	Tenzin Shezang				
11	MF	Sonam Tobgay				
12	MF	Lungtok Dawa	18 December 1998 (age 27)			(Bhutan Football Federation) Druk Star
14	MF	Dawa Tshering				(Bhutan Football Federation) Ugyen Academy FC
16	MF	Tshering Dorji	10 September 1993 (age 33)			(Bhutan Football Federation) Thimphu City
17	MF	Biren Basnet	20 October 1994 (age 32)			(Bhutan Football Federation) Thimphu City
3	MF	Lhendup Dorji	5 December 1994 (age 31)			(Bhutan Football Federation) Druk Star
7	FW	Chencho Gyeltshen	10 May 1996 (age 30)			(Football Association of Thailand) Satun United
15	FW	Kesang Penjor				
18	FW	Dorji				
19	FW	Kezang Wangdi				(Bhutan Football Federation) Druk Star

== Competitive record ==
=== Asian Games ===
Asian Games record
Year	Result	Position	Pld	W	T	L	GF	GA
Senior National Team
1951 – 1998	See Bhutan national football team							
Under-23 National Team
(South Korea) 2002	Did not enter							
(Qatar) 2006	Did not enter							
(China) 2010	Did not enter							
(South Korea) 2014	Did not enter							
(Indonesia) 2018	Did not enter							
(China) 2022	Did not enter							
Total	0/0	0 Titles	0	0	0	0	0	

=== South Asian Games ===
South Asian Games record
Year	Result	Position	Pld	W	T	L	GF	GA
Senior National Team
1984 – 1999	See Bhutan national football team							
Under-23 National Team
(Pakistan) 2004	No medal	4th	4	0	1	3	1	5
(Sri Lanka) 2006	No medal	8th	3	0	0	3	0	9
(Bangladesh) 2010	No medal	8th	3	0	0	3	0	7
(India) 2016	No medal	6th	2	0	1	1	1	6
(Nepal) 2019	Silver	2nd	5	3	0	2	6	5
(Pakistan) 2021								

== International opponents ==
Last match updated: Nepal on 10 December 2019.

Opponent	Played	Won	Drawn	Lost	For	Against	Diff	Win %	Loss %
Bangladesh	3	1	1	1	2	5	−3	33%	33%
India	1	0	0	1	1	4	−3	0%	100%
Maldives	3	1	0	2	2	3	−1	33%	66%
Nepal	5	0	0	5	1	13	−12	0%	100%
Pakistan	1	0	0	1	0	4	−4	0%	100%
Sri Lanka	4	1	1	2	3	5	−2	25%	50%
Total	17	3	2	12	9	36	-27	18%	70%

Key
>50% Wins
50% Wins
<50% Wins

== See also ==
- Bhutan national football team
- Bhutan women's national football team
- Bhutan national under-19 football team
- Bhutan national under-17 football team
- Bhutan national futsal team
