= Football at the 2004 Summer Olympics – Men's Asian Qualifiers =

Tournament details
- Dates: 5 April 2003 – 12 May 2004
- Teams: 36 (from 1 confederation)

The Asian Football Confederation's Pre-Olympic Tournament was held from 5 April 2003 to 12 May 2004. Thirty-six teams entered the qualification for the three allocated spots for the 2004 Summer Olympics Football tournament in Athens.

The qualification saw Korea Republic, Japan and Iraq winning their final round groups and qualifying to the Olympics.

== Format ==
Asian berths for the final is 3.

Preliminary round
12 highest seeded teams received byes for the second round. Other 24 teams were paired, where each pair played home and away. The 12 winners would advance to the second round.
Second round
24 teams were paired, where each pair played home and away. The 12 winners would advance to the final round.
Final round
12 teams were grouped into 3 groups of 4 teams each, where each group would consist of home and away round-robin tournament. The winners of each group would qualify to the finals.

== Preliminary round 1 ==
5 April 2003

Turkmenistan	2 – 0	India

19 April 2003

India	1 – 0	Turkmenistan

Turkmenistan won 2 – 1 on aggregate and advanced to the Second Round.

5 April 2003

Lebanon	0 – 0	Jordan

19 April 2003

Jordan	1 – 1	Lebanon

1 – 1 on aggregate; Lebanon won on away goals and advanced to the Second Round.

10 September 2003

Chinese Taipei	2 – 1	Singapore

17 September 2003

Singapore	4 – 1	Chinese Taipei

Singapore won 5 – 3 on aggregate and advanced to the Second Round.

10 September 2003

Iraq	3 – 1	Vietnam

17 September 2003

Vietnam	1 – 1	Iraq

Iraq won 4 – 2 on aggregate and advanced to the Second Round.

5 April 2003

Oman	8 – 0	Cambodia
	Report

Muscat, Oman

9 April 2003

Cambodia	0 – 9	Oman
	Report

Muscat, Oman

Oman won 17 – 0 on aggregate and advanced to the Second Round.

10 September 2003

Hong Kong	1 – 0	Sri Lanka

17 September 2003

Sri Lanka	0 – 2	Hong Kong

Hong Kong won 3 – 0 on aggregate and advanced to the Second Round.

12 April 2003

Myanmar	3 – 0	Bangladesh

19 April 2003

Bangladesh	0 – 0	Myanmar

Myanmar won 3 – 0 on aggregate and advanced to the Second Round.

12 April 2003

Nepal	0 – 1	Palestine

14 April 2003

Palestine	2 – 1	Nepal

Palestine won 3 – 1 on aggregate and advanced to the Second Round.

16 April 2003

Syria	2 – 0	Pakistan

19 April 2003

Pakistan	1 – 6	Syria

Syria won 8 – 1 on aggregate and advanced to the Second Round.

19 April 2003

United Arab Emirates	3 – 0	Tajikistan

26 April 2003

Tajikistan	0 – 1	United Arab Emirates

United Arab Emirates won 4 – 0 on aggregate and advanced to the Second Round.

Iran	w/o	Maldives

Maldives withdrew. Iran advanced to the Second Round.

Kyrgyzstan	w/o	Yemen

Yemen withdrew. Kyrgyzstan advanced to the Second Round.

== Preliminary round 2 ==
1 October 2003

Hong Kong	0 – 1	South Korea

7 October 2003

South Korea	2 – 0	Hong Kong

South Korea won 3 – 0 on aggregate and advanced to the Final Round.

3 May 2003

Indonesia	1 – 0	Lebanon

7 June 2003

Lebanon	5 – 1	Indonesia

Lebanon won 5 – 2 on aggregate and advanced to the Final Round.

1 October 2003

Saudi Arabia	7 – 0	Singapore

7 October 2003

Singapore	0 – 3	Saudi Arabia

Saudi Arabia won 10 – 0 on aggregate and advanced to the Final Round.

22 September 2003

North Korea	2 – 0	Iraq

8 November 2003

Iraq	4 – 1	North Korea

Iraq won 4 – 3 on aggregate and advanced to the Final Round.

3 May 2003

Qatar	1 – 0	Oman

7 June 2003

Oman	2 – 0	Qatar

Oman won 2 – 1 on aggregate and advanced to the Final Round.

1 May 2003

Bahrain	2 – 1	Kyrgyzstan

4 May 2003

Kyrgyzstan	1 – 5	Bahrain

Bahrain won 7 – 2 on aggregate and advanced to the Final Round.

1 May 2003

Japan	3 – 0	Myanmar

3 May 2003

Myanmar	0 – 5	Japan

Japan won 8 – 0 on aggregate and advanced to the Final Round.

3 May 2003

Kuwait	1 – 1	Palestine

7 June 2003

Palestine	1 – 2	Kuwait

Kuwait won 3 – 2 on aggregate and advanced to the Final Round.

10 September 2003

China	2 – 0	Syria

17 September 2003

Syria	3 – 2	China

China won 4 – 3 on aggregate and advanced to the Final Round.

10 September 2003

United Arab Emirates	4 – 1	Thailand

17 September 2003

Thailand	1 – 1	United Arab Emirates

United Arab Emirates won 5 – 2 on aggregate and advanced to the Final Round.

3 May 2003

Uzbekistan	1 – 3	Iran

7 June 2003

Iran	6 – 1	Uzbekistan

Iran won 9 – 2 on aggregate and advanced to the Final Round.

Malaysia	w/o	Turkmenistan

Turkmenistan withdrew due to SARS fears. Malaysia advanced to the Final Round.

== Preliminary round 3 ==
The final round was played in three groups of four teams each held from 1 March to 12 May 2004. The winner of each group will represent Asia at the 2004 Olympic Games.

=== Group A ===
3 March 2004	South Korea	1 – 0	China

3 March 2004	Malaysia	1 – 4	Iran

17 March 2004	Iran	0 – 1	South Korea

20 March 2004	China	1 – 1	Malaysia

24 March 2004	Malaysia	0 – 1	South Korea

27 March 2004	China	3 – 1	Iran

14 April 2004	South Korea	3 – 0	Malaysia

16 April 2004	Iran	2 – 1	China

30 April 2004	Iran	6 – 0	Malaysia

1 May 2004	China	0 – 2	South Korea

12 May 2004	South Korea	1 – 0	Iran

12 May 2004	Malaysia	1 – 2	China

Rank	Team	Pld	W	D	L	GF	GA	GD	Pts
1	South Korea	6	6	0	0	9	0	+9	18
2	Iran	6	3	0	3	13	7	+6	9
3	China	6	2	1	3	7	8	–1	7
4	Malaysia	6	0	1	5	3	17	–14	1

South Korea qualify to the 2004 Summer Olympics Football tournament in Athens.

=== Group B ===
1 March 2004	Bahrain	0 – 0	Japan

1 March 2004	United Arab Emirates	4 – 2	Lebanon

3 March 2004	Lebanon	0 – 4	Japan

3 March 2004	United Arab Emirates	3 – 0	Bahrain

5 March 2004	Bahrain	5 – 3	Lebanon

5 March 2004	United Arab Emirates	0 – 2	Japan

14 March 2004	Lebanon	2 – 2	United Arab Emirates

14 March 2004	Japan	0 – 1	Bahrain

16 March 2004	Bahrain	2 – 0	United Arab Emirates

16 March 2004	Japan	2 – 1	Lebanon

18 March 2004	Lebanon	1 – 1	Bahrain

18 March 2004	Japan	3 – 0	United Arab Emirates

Rank	Team	Pld	W	D	L	GF	GA	GD	Pts
1	Japan	6	4	1	1	11	2	+9	13
2	Bahrain	6	3	2	1	9	7	+2	11
3	United Arab Emirates	6	2	1	3	9	11	–2	7
4	Lebanon	6	0	2	4	9	18	–9	2

Japan qualify to the 2004 Summer Olympics Football tournament in Athens.

=== Group C ===
3 March 2004	Iraq	4 – 0	Oman

3 March 2004	Kuwait	0 – 0	Saudi Arabia

17 March 2004	Oman	1 – 0	Kuwait

17 March 2004	Saudi Arabia	1 – 0	Iraq

24 March 2004	Iraq	2 – 1	Kuwait

24 March 2004	Saudi Arabia	1 – 1	Oman

14 April 2004	Kuwait	2 – 0	Iraq

14 April 2004	Oman	0 – 0	Saudi Arabia

28 April 2004	Oman	2 – 0	Iraq

28 April 2004	Saudi Arabia	0 – 1	Kuwait

12 May 2004	Kuwait	0 – 0	Oman

12 May 2004	Iraq	3 – 1	Saudi Arabia

Rank	Team	Pld	W	D	L	GF	GA	GD	Pts
1	Iraq	6	3	0	3	9	7	+2	9
2	Oman	6	2	3	1	4	5	–1	9
3	Kuwait	6	2	2	2	4	3	+1	8
4	Saudi Arabia	6	1	3	2	3	5	–2	6

Iraq qualify to the 2004 Summer Olympics Football tournament in Athens.

== See also ==
- Football at the 2004 Summer Olympics
- Football at the 2004 Summer Olympics – Women's qualification#AFC (Asia)
