= Shahid Ahmed =

Pakistani footballer

Personal information
- Full name: Shahid Ahmed
- Date of birth: 20 November 1983 (age 42)
- Place of birth: Naudero, Pakistan
- Positions: Midfielder; forward

Senior career*
Years	Team	Apps	(Gls)
2002–2007	PTCL		
2007–2011	Khan Research Laboratories		

International career
2004–2006	Pakistan U23		
2006–2008	Pakistan	4	(0)
Medal record
Pakistan
Winner	South Asian Games	2004 Islamabad
Winner	South Asian Games	2006 Colombo
- * Club domestic league appearances and goals

Shahid Ahmed (born 20 November 1983) is a Pakistani former footballer who played as a forward.

== International career ==
Ahmed was called by the Pakistan under-23 national team for the 2004 and 2006 South Asian Games, where he helped Pakistan win the gold medal.

Ahmed made his senior international debut against Oman in 2006 during the 2007 AFC Asian Cup qualification.

== Career statistics ==
=== International ===
Appearances and goals by national team and year
National team	Year	Apps	Goals
Pakistan	2006	2	0
Pakistan	2007	2	0
Total		4	0

== Honours ==
=== Pakistan U23 ===
- South Asian Games: 2004, 2006
