= Imran Niazi =

Pakistani footballer (born 1986)

Personal information
- Date of birth: November 17, 1985 (age 40)
- Place of birth: Dera Ismail Khan, Pakistan
- Position: Midfielder

Senior career*
Years	Team	Apps	(Gls)
2003–2004	Afghan Chaman	16	(0)
2004–2014	WAPDA	238	(35)
Total		254	(35)

International career
2003	Pakistan U20		
2004–2007	Pakistan U23		
2005–2011	Pakistan	16	(0)
Medal record
Representing Pakistan
Winner	South Asian Games	2004
- * Club domestic league appearances and goals

Imran Niazi (born November 17, 1986) is a Pakistani former footballer who played as a midfielder.

== Club career ==
=== Afghan Chaman ===
Niazi began his career in 2003 at Afghan FC Chaman.

=== WAPDA ===
After the conclusion of re-branded Pakistan Premier League, he joined five-time national champions WAPDA. Niazi won three Pakistan Premier League titles with WAPDA, in 2007–08, 2008–09 and 2010–11. He also played at the AFC President Cup with the club.

== International career ==
In 2003, Niazi was first called by the Pakistan under-20 national team at the 2004 AFC Youth Championship qualification.

Niazi was first called up to the Pakistan under-23 national team for the 2004 South Asian Games, where he helped Pakistan win the gold medal.

He made his senior international debut in the 2005 SAFF Championship against Bangladesh.

In 2007, Niazi was also present with the Pakistan under-23 team at the Football at the 2008 Summer Olympics Qualifiers where his side beat Singapore in a home and away series to qualify for the second round.

In 2008, Niazi was named the Pakistan national team vice-captain for the 2008 SAFF Championship with Zahid Hameed as captain. He was also vice-captain in a friendly against Malaysia at the end of the year, under Muhammad Essa's captaincy.

After last playing against India at the 2012 AFC Challenge Cup qualification, he was dropped from the squad for the 2014 FIFA World Cup qualification against Bangladesh.

== Career statistics ==
=== International ===
Appearances and goals by year and competition
National team	Year	Apps	Goals
Pakistan	2005	6	0
Pakistan	2006	3	0
Pakistan	2007	2	0
Pakistan	2008	4	0
Pakistan	2011	1	0
Total		16	0

== Honours ==
=== WAPDA ===
- Pakistan Premier League: 2007–08, 2008–09, 2010–11

=== Pakistan U23 ===
- South Asian Games: 2004
