= Jaffar Khan =

Pakistani footballer (born 1981)

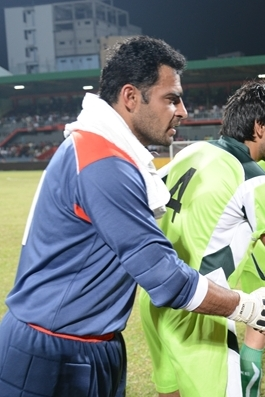
- Khan in 2013

Personal information
- Full name: Jaffar Khan
- Date of birth: 20 March 1981 (age 45)
- Place of birth: Paniala, Pakistan
- Height: 1.78 m (5 ft 10 in)
- Position: Goalkeeper

Team information
- Current team: Pakistan U23 (Goalkeeper Coach)

Youth career
- 1997–1998: Khyber FC Paniala

Senior career*
Years	Team	Apps	(Gls)
1998–2019	Pakistan Army		

International career
2000	Pakistan U20		
2002–2010	Pakistan U23		
2001–2013	Pakistan	47	(0)

Managerial career
- 2021–: Pakistan Army
Medal record
Representing Pakistan
Winner	South Asian Games	2004
- * Club domestic league appearances and goals

Jaffar Khan (Urdu, Pashto: جعفر خان; born on 20 March 1981) is a Pakistani football manager and former footballer who played as a goalkeeper for the Pakistan national football team. He is the current head coach of Pakistan Army F.C.

Jaffar played for Pakistan Army F.C. from 1998 till 2019. He was first called up to the Pakistan national team in 2001 and captained the national side from 2003 until 2013. Despite his lack of height needed for modern goalkeepers, he was praised for his shot-stopping skills and reflexes. He is considered one of the most successful goalkeepers to play for Pakistan. Khan also served as a soldier in the Pakistan Army.

== Early life ==
He was born on 20 March 1981 in Paniala, in the Dera Ismail Khan district in Pakistan's North West Frontier Province into an ethnic Pashtun family. At the age of 16, he started playing club football with Khyber Club Paniala.

== Club career ==
Khan was inducted into the Pakistan Army through the sports quota in 1998.

In 2000, he kept a clean sheet in the PFF President's Cup final against Allied Bank, which Pakistan Army won 1–0. Khan helped them retain the trophy in 2001 until 2006-07 where he set a new goalkeeping record by not conceding a goal through 16 matches.

In 2001, Khan reportedly received an offer from a second division club in the UK and also a first division side in Korea, but was not given permission from the superiors in the Pakistan Army.

== International career ==
=== 2001–2003: Rise to prominence ===
Khan was discovered by then Pakistan youth team and under-23 manager John Layton back in early 1999, and found his way into the Pakistan national football team soon enough. In November 2000, he featured at the 2000 AFC Youth Championship in Tehran. Khan was declared the Man of the Match in a 2–1 victory against United Arab Emirates.

He started his senior international career with a tour of England in 2001 against Coventry City. He subsequently played at the 2002 FIFA World Cup qualification in 2001, and a friendly test series against Sri Lanka in 2002. In April 2002, he played with the youth team during the 2002 AFC Youth Championship qualification in Karachi. He was also called by the Pakistan national under-23 team for the 2002 Asian Games. After participating in the 2003 SAFF Gold Cup, he featured in the 2004 AFC Asian Cup qualification.

=== 2003–2013: Captaincy ===
At the 2006 FIFA World Cup qualification in November 2003 against Kyrgyzstan, Khan replaced Haroon Yousaf as the captain of the national team.

After playing at the 2004 Summer Olympics qualifiers, he took the under-23 side all the way to the final of the 2004 South Asian Games against India, where his string of saves gave Pakistan a 1–0 victory. After playing in the 2005 Islamic Solidarity Games, he retained his captaincy for a three-match friendly series against India in 2005, later playing in the 2005 SAFF Gold Cup and the 2007 AFC Asian Cup qualification the same year. He also captained the national side at the 2006 AFC Challenge Cup.

Like several players of Army FC, Jaffar Khan remained actively serving in the Pakistan Army as a Non-Commissioned Officer and during the 2007–08 season, he received a summons to join the UN peacekeeping operations in Congo. When he was away on military duty, Pakistan succumbed to one of their worst defeats, losing by 7–0 to Iraq.

In December 2009, at the end of the SAFF Championship in Bangladesh, Jaffar publicly stated his decision to retire from international football after a fallout with Pakistan's Austrian coach György Kottán, but returned later on captaining the under-23 side at the 2010 Asian Games.

In 2011, he played at the 2014 World Cup qualification. At the 2011 SAFF Championship, he conceded a single goal in the three matches all resulting in a draw, failing to register the qualification for the semifinal round. After a series of friendlies against Singapore, Nepal and Maldives in 2012 and 2013, he played his last match for the national team against Macau at the 2014 AFC Challenge Cup qualification. He was ruled out of the 2013 SAFF Championship due to knee injury during a match of the Inter-Services Football tournament at the Naval Sports Complex.

== Coaching career ==
Khan got an AFC License C and did a specialised goalkeeping course in Bahrain. He was briefly appointed as goalkeeping coach for the Pakistan national team from 2014 to 2015. In 2019 following his retirement from football, he became the goalkeeping coach for his club. In 2021, Khan was appointed as head coach of Pakistan Army.

In August 2023, Khan was appointed as the goalkeeping coach for the Pakistan under 16 national team for the 2023 SAFF U16 Championship held in Bhutan.

== Personal life ==
Like several players of Army FC, Jaffar Khan was still in service with the Pakistan Army as a Non-Commissioned Officer with the Frontier Force Regiment, and during the 2007-08 season was called up to service for UN peacekeeping operations in Congo. On 7 May 2009, Jaffar received AFC Distinguished Services Awards from FIFA President Sepp Blatter at Kuala Lumpur during the AFC 23rd Congress.

== Career statistics ==
=== International ===
Appearances and goals by national team and year
National team	Year	Apps	Goals
Pakistan	2001	5	0
Pakistan	2002	2	0
Pakistan	2003	9	0
Pakistan	2005	9	0
Pakistan	2006	8	0
Pakistan	2009	3	0
Pakistan	2011	5	0
Pakistan	2012	1	0
Pakistan	2013	5	0
Total		47	0

== Honours ==
Pakistan Army

- Pakistan Premier League: 2005–06, 2006–07
- Pakistan National Football Challenge Cup: 2000, 2001

Pakistan U23

- South Asian Games: 2004

== See also ==
- List of Pakistan national football team captains
