= Pakistan national under-23 football team =

Men's under-20 national association football team representing Pakistan

Pakistan Under-23
- Nickname(s): Green Shirts, Pak Shaheens
- Association: Pakistan Football Federation
- Confederation: AFC (Asia)
- Sub-confederation: SAFF (South Asia)
- Head coach: Nolberto Solano
- Captain: Haseeb Khan
- Top scorer: Muhammad Essa (7)
- FIFA code: PAK
First colours	Second colours

First international
- Pakistan 0–1 Yemen (30 August 1991)

Biggest win
- Pakistan 4–0 Bhutan (Colombo, Sri Lanka; 23 August 2006)

Biggest defeat
- Pakistan 0–8 Bahrain (Isa Town, Bahrain; 28 February 2007)

Asian Cup
- Appearances: none

Asian Games
- Appearances: 5 (first in 2002)
- Best result: 17/25 (2018)

South Asian Games
- Appearances: 3 (first in 2004)
- Best result: Gold Medal (2004, 2006)
Medal record
Men's football
South Asian Games
Gold medal – first place	2004 Islamabad	Team
Gold medal – first place	2006 Colombo	Team

The Pakistan U-23 national football team, also known as the Pakistan Olympic football team, is a youth football team operated under the Pakistan Football Federation. The team represents Pakistan in international youth football competitions in the Summer Olympics, Asian Games and the South Asian Games (of which it has won the 2004 and 2006 editions), as well as any other under-23 and under-22 international football tournaments, such as the AFC U-23 Asian Cup.

== History ==
=== 1990s ===
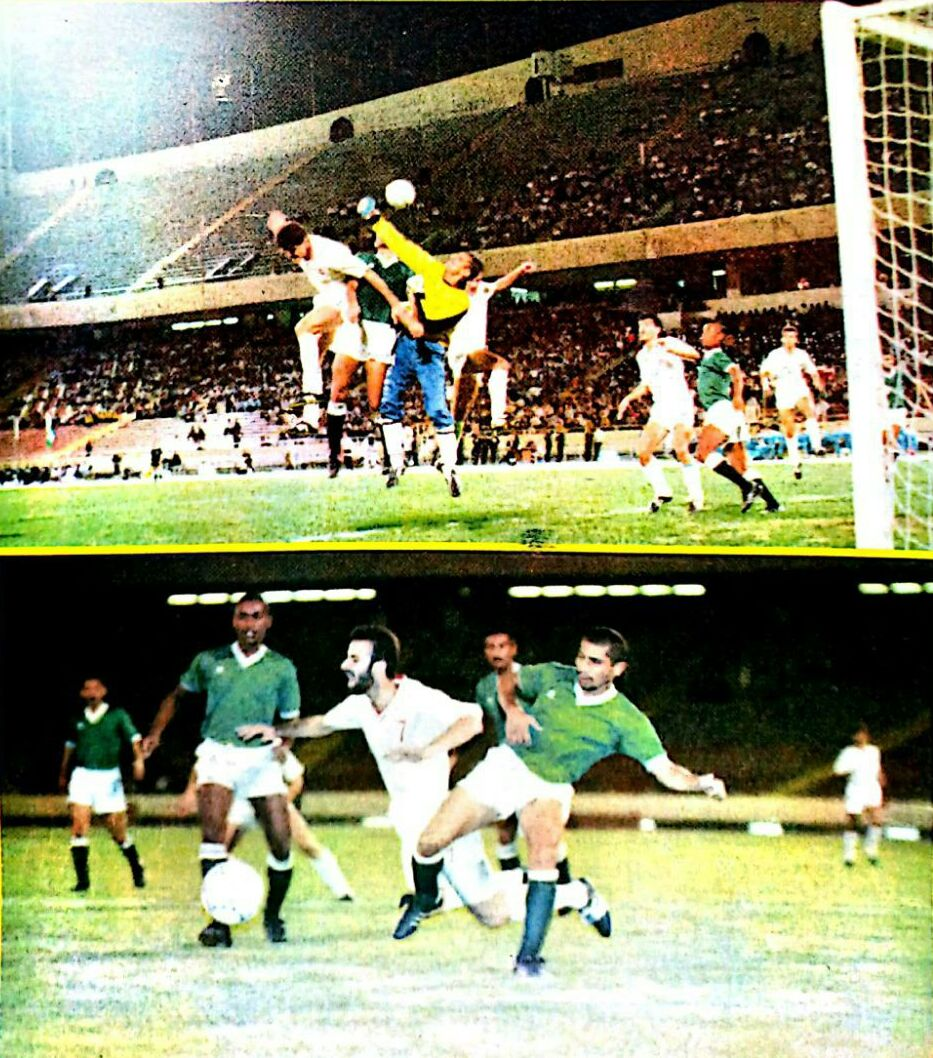
Iran vs Pakistan at the Summer Olympics Qualifiers, 23 September 1991

The under-23 era for Pakistan began in the early 1990s when men's Olympic football was reformed as an under-23 competition for the 1992 Barcelona Games (with the "three over-age players" allowance added from 1996). Prior to that in earlier Olympic qualifiers, where many teams played under amateur eligibility with no age cap, Pakistan like many Asian countries fielded their senior national team in the 1964 and 1988 qualifiers editions. Asia later aligned some regional events, the Asian Games adopted the U-23 with over-age format in 2002, and the South Asian Games did so in 2004.

Within this new framework, Pakistan entered 1992 Summer Olympics Qualifiers, finishing bottom of a group with Yemen, Qatar, the UAE and Iran. The side also took part in the 1996 Summer Olympics Qualifiers but did not register a win and went out in the preliminary rounds.

=== 2000s ===
The under-23 side participated at the 2002 Asian Games in Busan, South Korea. They were put into a group with Kuwait, North Korea and Hong Kong, losing all matches. The next year they also lost in both legs against Syria at the 2004 Summer Olympics Qualifiers.

The under-23 side won the gold medal at the 2004 South Asian Games held across 3 venues in Pakistan from March 28 to April 6, 2004. The tournament was the first to introduce an under-23 tournament system for the football events. Muhammad Essa ended the tournament as top scorer and was player of the tournament, and helped Pakistan win the gold medal. His goal in the semi final against Sri Lanka which ultimately ended in a 1–1 draw until the penalty shootout took Pakistan all the way to the final against India, where Abdul Aziz's goal gave Pakistan a 1–0 victory.

In the 2006 South Asian Games held across in Colombo, Sri Lanka from 14 to 26 August 2006, Pakistan again won the gold medal. After advancing from the group stages, Essa's strike against Nepal led Pakistan to the final against Sri Lanka, which ended in a victory for the Green Shirts thanks to a goal by Adeel Ahmed in the half time. However, at the 2006 Asian Games, Pakistan failed to advance past group stage.

In 2007, Pakistan thrashed Singapore in both the home and away legs by 2–1 and 3–2, consecutively under the newly appointed head coach Muhammad Rasheed, and won the preliminary round of 2008 Summer Olympics first time in the history of Olympics.

=== 2010s ===
In 2010, the team failed to advance past group stage at both 2010 South Asian Games and the 2010 Asian Games. In 2011, after a tour to Thailand, the team played at the 2012 Summer Olympic Qualifiers against Malaysia, and also played in a two-match test series against Palestine in March 2011.

The next year, the team featured in the 2012 Palestine International Cup, 2013 AFC U-22 qualification and the Mahinda Rajapaksa Trophy in Sri Lanka.

In 2014, the team featured again in the 2014 Palestine International Championship, and later played a friendly against the Indonesia senior team. The team subsequently failed to get past the group stage at the 2014 Asian Games. The next year the team played at the 2016 AFC U-23 qualification in the United Arab Emirates.

The team missed international exposure for the next 3 years, due to internal crisis within the Pakistan Football Federation, and the consequent suspension by FIFA on 10 October 2017. FIFA restored membership of PFF on 13 March 2018. With the 2018 Asian Games approaching in August, the team had very little time to prepare. PFF announced the signing of new Brazilian coach José Antonio Nogueira the team flew to Indonesia. On 14 August 2018, the team played its first group game against Vietnam, which resulted in a 3–0 loss. On 16 August 2018, the team faced a loss against Japan by a scoreline of 4–0. Pakistan defeated Nepal by 2–1 in their final group game which was the former's first win in Asian Games after 44 years.

=== 2020s ===
The team again missed international exposure due to another suspension on the PFF, until 2023 when the team under head coach Shahzad Anwar featured at the 2024 AFC U-23 Asian Cup qualification, losing all three games against Japan, Bahrain and Palestine.

== Result and fixtures ==
For all previous match results of the national under-23 team, see the team's results page. The following is a list of match results in the last 12 months, as well as any future matches that have been scheduled.

Win Draw Loss

== Coaching staff ==
=== Current staff ===
As of July 2025

Position	Name
Head coach	(Peru) Nolberto Solano
Assistant coach	(Pakistan) Gohar Zaman
Assistant coach	(Pakistan) Mehmood Khan
Goalkeeping coach	(Pakistan) Jaffar Khan
Fitness Coach	(Argentina) Jorge Castaneira
Physiotherapist	(Pakistan) Muhammad Adnan
Masseur	Vacant
Kitmen	Vacant
Team manager	(Pakistan) Shahzaib Khan

=== Managerial history ===
Year	Head coach
1991	(Pakistan) Muhammad Naeem
1995	(Pakistan) Muhammad Idrees
2002	(Slovenia) Jozef Herel
2003	(Pakistan) Muhammad Lateef
2004	(China) Wang Xiao He
2006	(Bahrain) Salman Sharida
2007	(Pakistan) Muhammad Rasheed
2010	(Austria) György Kottán
2010	(Pakistan) Akhtar Mohiuddin
2011	(Pakistan) Tariq Lutfi
2012	(Serbia) Zaviša Milosavljević
2014–2015	(Bahrain) Mohammad Al-Shamlan
2018	(Brazil) José Antonio Nogueira
2023	(Pakistan) Shahzad Anwar
2025–	(Peru) Nolberto Solano

== Players ==
=== Current squad ===
- The following players were called up for the 2026 AFC U-23 Asian Cup qualification.

No.	Pos.	Player	Date of birth (age)	Caps	Goals	Club
1	GK	Adam Khan	24 October 2005 (age 21)	0	0	(The Football Association) Blackburn Rovers U21
20	GK	Hassan Ali	23 February 2003 (age 23)	0	0	(Pakistan Football Federation) WAPDA
3	DF	Mohib Ullah	23 May 2005 (age 21)	3	0	(Pakistan Football Federation) Karachi United
4	DF	Muhammad Haroon		0	0	(Pakistan Football Federation)
5	DF	Haseeb Khan (Captain)	4 April 2000 (age 26)	3	0	(Pakistan Football Federation) Pakistan Air Force
6	DF	Junaid Shah	23 March 2003 (age 23)	0	0	(Pakistan Football Federation) SA Gardens
13	DF	Muhammad Adeel		0	0	(Pakistan Football Federation)
15	DF	Ans Amin		0	0	(Pakistan Football Federation)
19	DF	Abdul Rehman	25 February 2008 (age 18)	0	0	(Pakistan Football Federation) POPO FC
23	DF	Hamza Munir	31 July 2003 (age 23)	0	0	(Pakistan Football Federation) SA Gardens
2	MF	Adnan Justin		0	0	(Pakistan Football Federation)
8	MF	Mohammad Hayan Khattak		1	0	(Pakistan Football Federation) POPO FC
12	MF	Ali Zafar	28 August 2007 (age 19)	0	0	(Pakistan Football Federation) POPO FC
14	MF	Muhammad Junaid		0	0	(Pakistan Football Federation)
18	MF	Tufail Shinwari	10 May 2006 (age 20)	0	0	(Pakistan Football Federation) Karachi United
7	FW	Furqan Umar	15 April 2004 (age 22)	0	0	(Pakistan Football Federation) Karachi United
9	FW	Adeel Younas	23 March 2006 (age 20)	0	0	(Pakistan Football Federation) POPO FC
10	FW	McKeal Abdullah	7 July 2005 (age 21)	0	0	(The Football Association) Mansfield Town U21
11	FW	Ahmed Salman		0	0	(United Arab Emirates Football Association) Dubai City
16	FW	Suleman Ali		0	0	(Pakistan Football Federation)
17	FW	Ali Raza		0	0	(Pakistan Football Federation)
21	FW	Umair Bahader		0	0	(Pakistan Football Federation)

=== Past squads ===
==== Asian Games ====
- 2002 Asian Games
- 2006 Asian Games
- 2010 Asian Games
- 2014 Asian Games
- 2018 Asian Games

==== South Asian Games ====
- 2004 South Asian Games

== Player records ==
=== Top goalscorers ===
As of 9 September 2025

Rank	Player	Goals	Period
1	Muhammad Essa	7	2002–2006
2	Farooq Shah	4	2004–2007
3	Saddam Hussain	3	2010–2018
4	Adeel Ahmed	2	2002–2006
4	Muhammad Rasool	2	2006–2007
4	Shahid Ahmed	2	2004–2006

== Competitive record ==
=== AFC U-23 Championship ===
AFC U-23 Championship was initially set to be held as AFC U-22 Championships in 2013 and its qualification matches in 2012, but the finals tournament was postponed to be played in January 2014.

AFC U-23 Championship record									AFC U-23 qualification record					
Year	Result	Position	Pld	W	T	L	GF	GA	Pld	W	T	L	GF	GA
(Oman) 2014	did not qualify								5	0	1	4	0	8
(Qatar) 2016	did not qualify								3	1	0	2	3	8
(China) 2018	did not qualify								did not enter					
(Thailand) 2020	Withdrawn								Withdrawn					
(Uzbekistan) 2022	Suspended								Suspended					
(Qatar) 2024	did not qualify								3	0	0	3	2	11
(Saudi Arabia) 2026	did not qualify								3	0	0	3	1	10
(Japan) 2028	To be determined								To be determined					
Totals	0/8	0 Titles	0	0	0	0	0	0	14	1	1	12	6	37

=== Olympic record ===
Summer Olympic Games record
Year	Result	Position	Pld	W	D	L	GF	GA
(Spain) 1992	Did not qualify							
(United States) 1996	Did not qualify							
(Australia) 2000	Did not enter							
(Greece) 2004	Did not qualify							
(China) 2008	Did not qualify							
(United Kingdom) 2012	Did not qualify							
(Brazil) 2016	Did not qualify							
(Japan) 2020	to be determined							
(France) 2024	to be determined							
(United States) 2028	to be determined							
Total		0 / 7						

=== Asian Games ===
Asian Games record
Year	Result	Position	Pld	W	T	L	GF	GA
Senior National Team
1951 – 1998	See Pakistan national football team							
Under-23 National Team
(South Korea) 2002	Round 1	23	3	0	0	3	0	14
(Qatar) 2006	Round 1	21	3	0	0	3	2	6
(China) 2010	Group stage	22	3	0	1	2	0	8
(South Korea) 2014	Group stage	24	2	0	1	1	0	3
(Indonesia) 2018	Group stage	17	3	1	0	2	2	8
(China) 2022	Did not enter							
Total	5/6	-	11	1	1	9	4	31

=== South Asian Games ===
South Asian Games record
Year	Result	Pld	W	D*	L	GF	GA
(Pakistan) 2004	Champions	5	4	0	1	6	1
(Sri Lanka) 2006	Champions	5	4	0	1	9	4
(Bangladesh) 2010	Group stage	3	0	0	3	5	2
(India) 2016	Did not enter						
(Nepal) 2019	Did not enter						
Total	3/5	13	8	0	5	20	7

== Honours ==
- South Asian Games
  - (gold) Champions (2): 2004, 2006

== See also ==
- Pakistan Football Federation
- Pakistan national football team
- Pakistan national under-20 football team
- Pakistan national under-17 football team
- Pakistan women's national football team
