= Jerry Zirsanga =

Indian footballer

Personal information
- Full name: Jerry Zirsanga
- Date of birth: 25 December 1987 (age 38)
- Place of birth: Mizoram, India
- Height: 1.72 m (5 ft 7 1/2 in)
- Position: Midfielder

Team information
- Current team: Mohammedan

Senior career*
| Years | Team | Apps | (Gls) |
| 2004–2006 | Mohun Bagan | | (0) |
| 2006–2010 | Dempo | | (0) |
| 2010–2011 | Chirag United | 10 | (0) |
| 2011–2012 | Churchill Brothers | 6 | |
| 2012–2013 | Luangmual | 0 | |
| 2013– | Mohammedan | 7 | (1) |

International career
| 2004 | India U20 | | |
| 2004 | India | 5 | (1) |
- * Club domestic league appearances and goals

Jerry Zirsanga is an Indian football player who plays in Midfield position for century-old Kolkata-based club Mohammedan. He played only five matches for India but on 5 November 2004, he scored his only international goal against Kuwait and become India's youngest goal scorer aged 16 years 311 days.

== Career ==
=== Chirag United ===
Zirsanga started his footballing career during the 2010-11 I-League season with Chirag United SC of the I-League. On 24 December 2010 he scored the lone goal from a Lalkamal Bhowmick pass in the 1–0 home win over HAL in the I-League.

=== Churchill Brothers ===
After not adjusting and not playing for Chirag United SC Zirsanga transferred to Churchill Brothers S.C.

=== Mohammedan Sporting ===
In 2013 I-League 2nd Division final round, he played a vital role in the quest for promotion of the Kolkata-based club. On 8 April, he scored the only goal against the Shillong-based Rangdajied United F.C. to secure a 1–0 win.

== Honours ==
India U20

- South Asian Games Silver medal: 2004
