= Debabrata Roy =

Indian footballer

Personal information
- Full name: Debabrata Roy
- Date of birth: 4 November 1986 (age 39)
- Place of birth: Kolkata, West Bengal, India
- Height: 1.73 m (5 ft 8 in)
- Position: Right back

Team information
- Current team: Mohun Bagan
- Number: 2

Youth career
- 2000–2002: Sporting Union Club
- 2002–2004: Tata FA

Senior career*
Years	Team	Apps	(Gls)
2004–2005	Mahindra United	19	(0)
2005–2009	East Bengal		
2009	→ United SC (loan)		
2009–2010	Mahindra United		
2010	Dempo	53	(1)
2014	→ FC Goa (loan)	15	(0)
2015–2016	FC Goa	14	(0)
2016	Chennai City (loan)	14	(0)
2017–2018	Mohun Bagan	1	(0)

International career
2004	India U20		
2006	India U23		
2004–2011	India	16	(1)
- * Club domestic league appearances and goals

Debabrata Roy (born 4 November 1986) is an Indian football player. He is currently playing for FC Goa in the I-League as a right back.

== Career ==
Roy started his career playing in the Subroto Cup and the under-16 league in West Bengal for Sporting Union Club. His prodigious talent prompted his coaches to despatch him to the prestigious Tata Football Academy in 2000. His first taste of NFL/I-League action came while playing for Mahindra United in 2004-05 where the jeepmen finished a creditable fourth.

In 2005–06, he transferred home to East Bengal F.C. for whom he played for three years before joining United S.C. on a three-month loan spell in 2009. In 2009–10, he returned to Mahindra United who seemed destined for I-League glory till Dempo spoiled their party. After the Mumbai outfit disbanded, he joined Dempo S.C. in 2010-11 and continues to serve them with distinction. He has represented India at all levels right from the age groups teams to the senior team in a host of tournaments.

== Honours ==
India U20

- South Asian Games Silver medal: 2004
