= Mehmood Khan (footballer, born 1981) =

Pakistani footballer

Personal information
- Full name: Mehmood Khan
- Date of birth: 20 March 1981 (age 45)
- Place of birth: Chaman, Pakistan
- Height: 1.78 m (5 ft 10 in)
- Position: Defender

Youth career
- Mllli Afghan Quetta
- Afghan Sports Quetta

Senior career*
| Years | Team | Apps | (Gls) |
| –2004 | Afghan Chaman | | |
| 2005–2013 | National Bank | | |
| 2005–2015 | Afghan Chaman | | |

International career
| 2004 | Pakistan U23 | | |
| 2003–2009 | Pakistan | 16 | (0) |
Medal record
Representing Pakistan
| Winner | South Asian Games | 2004 |
- * Club domestic league appearances and goals

Mehmood Khan (born 20 March 1981) is a Pakistani former footballer who played as a defender, and manager.

== Early life ==
Khan was born on 20 March 1981 in Chaman, Balochistan. He studied in St. Mary's High School Quetta, and later he obtained an Inter degree from General Musa College and a B.Sc degree from Degree College Quetta. His elder brother was also a footballer, which inspired Khan to pursue football.

== Club career ==
Initially, Khan played as goalkeeper, but later advanced his position to defender. Khan started his football career at the club level with Milli Afghan FC Quetta, and later played for Afghan Sports Quetta and Afghan FC Chaman teams from 1996 to 2003. He was subsequently hired by Sui Southern Gas Quetta departmental team, soon became a part of the National Bank team.

== International career ==
Khan made his international debut at the 2003 SAFF Gold Cup. The next year, he won the 2004 South Asian Games with the U23 national team.

He then featured in several tournaments including 2005 Islamic Solidarity Games, 2005 SAFF Gold Cup, 2007 AFC Asian Cup qualification, 2009 ANFA Cup, and the 2010 AFC Challenge Cup qualification in 2009.

== Coaching career ==
Khan completed the AFC B licensing coaching Course in Kuala Lumpur in 2010. He then coached abroad at Vietnam’s Arsenal Soccer School for ten months in two stints, in 2012 and 2013. In 2025, he was appointed assistant coach along with Gohar Zaman of Pakistan U23 for the 2026 AFC U-23 Asian Cup qualification.

== Career statistics ==
=== International ===
Appearances and goals by year and competition
| National team | Year | Apps | Goals |
|---|---|---|---|
| Pakistan | 2003 | 5 | 0 |
| Pakistan | 2005 | 6 | 0 |
| Pakistan | 2009 | 5 | 0 |
| Total | | 16 | 0 |

== Honours ==
=== Pakistan U-23 ===
- South Asian Games: 2004
