= Farooq Shah =

Pakistani footballer

Personal information
- Full name: Farooq Shah
- Date of birth: October 19, 1985 (age 41)
- Place of birth: Karachi, Pakistan
- Height: 1.67 m (5 ft 6 in)
- Positions: Midfielder; striker

Youth career
- National Shaheen FC

Senior career*
Years	Team	Apps	(Gls)
2005–2019	National Bank		
2007	Karachi Bazigar		

International career
2004–2007	Pakistan U23		
2005–2008	Pakistan	24	(1)
Medal record
Representing Pakistan
Winner	South Asian Games	2004
- * Club domestic league appearances and goals

Farooq Shah (Urdu: فاروق شاہ; born on 19 October 1985) is a Pakistani former footballer, who played as a midfielder and striker.

== Club career ==
Shah made his debut in the 2005–06 season of the Pakistan premier League spending most of his career in his hometown departmental club National Bank in Karachi. He also played at National Shaheen FC along with his departmental club. He was also part of the Karachi Bazigar team in the inaugural season of the Super Football League.

He scored the initial goal of the club in the 2013–14 season, in a 1–0 victory over PIA. His volley goal in the 83rd minute against Army FC prevented the relegation of NBP and secured the next season.

In 2017, his scissor kick goal against SSGC was controversially denied, as NBP failed to advance to the semifinal of the NBP President’s Cup after losing 0–1.

== International career ==
Shah was first called by the Pakistan under 23 national team during the 2004 South Asian Games, where he helped Pakistan achieve the gold medal.

Shah earned his first senior international cap in a three-match friendly series against India in 2005. He scored his first goal in the 2008 AFC Challenge Cup qualifiers against Guam.

In 2007, Shah featured in the Pakistan under-23 at the Football at the 2008 Summer Olympics Qualifiers where his side beat Singapore in a home and away series to qualify for the second round, scoring one goal at the initial 2–1 win, and two goals in another 3–2 victory.

== Career statistics ==
=== International ===
Appearances and goals by national team and year
National team	Year	Apps	Goals
Pakistan	2005	8	0
Pakistan	2006	5	0
Pakistan	2007	2	0
Pakistan	2008	9	1
Pakistan	2011	1	0
Total		24	1

Scores and results list Pakistan's goal tally first, score column indicates score after each Shah goal.

List of international goals scored by Farooq Shah
No.	Date	Venue	Opponent	Score	Result	Competition
1	6 April 2008	Zhongshan Soccer Stadium, Taipei, Taiwan	Guam	3–0	9–2	2008 AFC Challenge Cup qualification

== Honours ==
With Pakistan U23

- South Asian Games Gold 2004
