= Mahmud Khan, Iran =

Mahmud Khan محمودخان
- Village
- Location within Iran
- Coordinates: 31°55′00″N 49°58′00″E
- Country: Iran
- Province: Khuzestan
- County: Izeh
- Bakhsh: Central
- Rural District: Howmeh-ye Sharqi

Population (2006)
  - Total: 31
- Time zone: UTC+3:30 (IRST)
  - Summer (DST): UTC+4:30 (IRDT)

Mahmud Khan (Persian: محمودخان, also Romanized as Maḩmūd Khān) is a village in Howmeh-ye Sharqi Rural District, in the Central District of Izeh County, Khuzestan Province, Iran. At the 2006 census, its population was 31, in 7 families.
