= Naveed Akram =

Pakistani international footballer (born 1984)

Personal information
- Full name: Muhammad Naveed Akram
- Date of birth: 16 May 1984 (age 42)
- Place of birth: Multan, Pakistan
- Position: Right-back

Senior career*
Years	Team	Apps	(Gls)
2003–2014	WAPDA		
2007	Lahore Lajpaals		
2011	→ Saraswoti Youth Club (loan)		
2014–2015	Lyallpur		

International career
2004–2006	Pakistan U23		
2004–2009	Pakistan	21	(1)
Medal record
Pakistan
Winner	South Asian Games	2004 Islamabad
Winner	South Asian Games	2006 Colombo
- * Club domestic league appearances and goals

Muhammad Naveed Akram (Urdu: محمد نوید اکرم; born 16 May 1984) is a Pakistani former footballer who played as a right-back.

== Club career ==
=== WAPDA ===
Akram won three Pakistan Premier League titles with WAPDA F. C. (in the 2004–05, 2007–08, 2008–09 and 2010–11 seasons) during his stint with the club from 2003 until 2014.

He was part of the Lahore Lajpaal team that lost in the semi-finals of Super Football League.

==== Loan to Saraswoti Youth Club ====
In 2011, Akram along with club compatriot Mehmood Ali were loaned to Nepali club Saraswoti Youth Club from May to July for the 2011 Martyr's Memorial A-Division League campaign. Both made their debut for the club on 21 May 2011, following a 0–2 loss against Brigade Boys Club at the Dasarath Rangsala Stadium. One month on, the duo helped the club win two games and reach the team target to climb out of the relegation zone.

=== Lyallpur ===
Akram had a short stint at Lyallpur in 2014, before his eventual retirement.

== International career ==
Akram was called by the Pakistan under-23 national team for the 2004 and 2006 South Asian Games, where he helped Pakistan win the gold medal.

He made his senior debut with Pakistan on 12 June 2005 which was the first game in a series of three games against India, the game finished 1–1 draw to Pakistan He was subsequently called for the 2005 SAFF Gold Cup. He scored his first goal on 15 November 2006 in the 2007 AFC Asian Cup qualification, in the eventual 2–3 loss against UAE. He also featured at the 2006 Asian Games, where he scored a long range goal in the eventual 2–3 loss against Japan.

== Playing style ==
Akram was praised for his defensive skills paired with his goal-scoring ability. He is most known for his memorable long range goal in the 2006 Asian Games, when Pakistan came close to a huge upset against Japan.

== Post-retirement ==
On 29 March 2021, Akram was appointed as secretary general of the Pakistan Football Federation, following a controversial takeover by Syed Ashfaq Hussain Shah, which eventually leaded to a ban by FIFA on the federation. Three years later on 28 August 2024, Akram along with 21 former officials faced a lifetime ban due to their alleged role in creating a parallel association and orchestrating a hostile takeover of the PFF offices.

== Career statistics ==
=== International ===
Appearances and goals by year and competition
National team	Year	Apps	Goals
Pakistan	2005	9	0
Pakistan	2006	8	1
Pakistan	2007	1	0
Pakistan	2008	3	0
Total		21	1

==== U-23 ====
#	Date	Venue	Opponent	Score	Result	Competition
1	29 November 2006	Qatar SC Stadium, Doha, Qatar	Japan	2–3	2–3	2006 Asian Games

==== Senior ====
No.	Date	Venue	Opponent	Score	Result	Competition
1	15 November 2006	Mohammed bin Zayed Stadium, Abu Dhabi, UAE	United Arab Emirates	1–0	2–3	2007 AFC Asian Cup qualification

== Honours ==
=== WAPDA ===
- National Football Championship: 2003
- Pakistan Premier League: 2004–05, 2007–08, 2008–09, 2010–11

=== Pakistan U23 ===
- South Asian Games: 2004, 2006
