= Mehmood Khan =

Mehmood Khan may refer to:

- Mehmood Khan (footballer, born 1981) Pakistani defender
- Mehmood Khan (footballer, born 1991) Pakistani midfielder

== See also ==
- Mahmud Khan (disambiguation)
