= Mehmood Ali (footballer) =

Pakistani footballer

Personal information
- Full name: Mehmood Ali
- Place of birth: Quetta, Pakistan
- Position: Midfielder

Senior career*
Years	Team	Apps	(Gls)
2007–??	WAPDA		
2011	→ Saraswoti Youth Club (loan)		

International career
2009	Pakistan	3	(0)
- * Club domestic league appearances and goals

Mehmood Ali is a Pakistani former footballer who played as a midfielder.

== Early life ==
Belonging to the ethnic Hazara community, Ali was born in Quetta in the Balochistan province of Pakistan.

== Club career ==
Ali started playing for WAPDA in the Pakistan Premier League.

In 2011, Ali along with club compatriot Naveed Akram were loaned to Nepali club Saraswoti Youth Club from May to July for the 2011 Martyr's Memorial A-Division League campaign. Both made their debut for the club on 21 May 2011, following a 0–2 loss against Brigade Boys Club at the Dasarath Rangsala Stadium. One month on, the duo helped the club win two games and reach the team target to climb out of the relegation zone.

== International career ==
Ali made his international debut in the 2009 SAFF Championship against Sri Lanka, following a call up by coach György Kottán.

== Coaching career ==
Following his retirement, Ali started coaching the Hazara Combined team in Quetta.

== Career statistics ==
=== International ===
Appearances and goals by year and competition
National team	Year	Apps	Goals
Pakistan	2009	3	0
Total		3	0
