= Muhammad Essa =

Pakistani footballer (born 1983)

Personal information
- Full name: Muhammad Essa Khan
- Date of birth: 20 November 1983 (age 42)
- Place of birth: Chaman, Pakistan
- Height: 1.78 m (5 ft 10 in)
- Position: Centre forward

Team information
- Current team: Pakistan U17 (assistant coach)

Youth career
- 1999–2000: Afghan Chaman

Senior career*
Years	Team	Apps	(Gls)
2000–2005	PTCL	34	(7)
2005–2006	Afghan Chaman	22	(12)
2006–2007	WAPDA		
2007–2009	Khan Research Laboratories		
2009–2017	K-Electric		

International career
2002–2006	Pakistan U23		(7)
2001–2009	Pakistan	40	(11)

Managerial career
- 2017–2018: K-Electric (assistant)
- 2018–2019: Pakistan (assistant)
- 2019–2020: K-Electric
- 2023–2024: Khan Research Laboratories
- 2025–: Pakistan U17 (assistant)
Medal record
Representing Pakistan
Winner	South Asian Games	2004
Winner	South Asian Games	2006
- * Club domestic league appearances and goals

Muhammad Essa Khan (Urdu, Pashto: محمد عیسیٰ خان; born 20 November 1983) is a Pakistani football manager and former footballer who played as a forward.

A former captain of the Pakistan national team, he is regarded among the most talented football players Pakistan has produced. He was used as a playmaker particularly in support of a striker, or a genuine centre forward because of his ball holding and passing skills. He was a left-footed free-kick specialist. In his playing days, Essa was one of the most well known faces in Pakistani football, due to his regular goal scoring at international level.

== Club career ==
=== Early career ===
Born in the city of Chaman in Pakistan's Balochistan province, he played in the youth team of Pakistani club side Afghan FC Chaman before signing for PTCL, with whom he won the old PFF President's Cup in 2003. In the inaugural Pakistan Premier League season in 2004, the club finished fifth in the league table.

==== Foreign interest ====
In June 2005, Essa was offered a playing contract from major Indian football team East Bengal FC after his stellar performance in the international friendly series against India, but the deal collapsed after the club decided to retain the striker Bhaichung Bhutia for the next season following the wages demands of Essa. Essa was also later offered to play for JCT in India, and clubs from Oman and Maldives but the move seemingly failed to materialise.

=== Afghan Chaman ===
In the second season of Pakistan Premier League season in 2005, he returned to his hometown club Afghan FC Chaman, with his goals helping them to finish fourth in the table.

=== WAPDA ===
The following season, he transferred to departmental side WAPDA, but could not help them retain their Pakistan Premier League title; finishing second to Pakistan Army.

=== KRL ===
He moved to Khan Research Laboratories, and helped them finish third in the 2007–08 season. The same year, he played in the Super Football League for Quetta Zorawar as captain. Although his team came second in the league round and lost in the semi-final in the knock-out round of the tournament, he was awarded the SFL 2007 Player of the Tournament trophy.

=== K-Electric ===
In 2009, he moved to K-Electric, where he served both as a player and assistant coach in the last years. He also played in the 2010 season that the Super Football League for Karachi Energy beating Quetta Zorawar 1–0 in final.

== International career ==
Essa started at the under-16 level in 1995, and went on to play for the under-19 side. He was discovered by youth team coach John Layton back in early 1999, and found his way into the Pakistan national football team soon enough. In 2004, Essa was called up to the Pakistan U-23 squad for the 2004 South Asian games. He ended the tournament as top scorer and was player of the tournament, and helped Pakistan win the gold medal. His goal in the semi final against Sri Lanka which ultimately ended in a 1–1 draw until the penalty shootout took Pakistan all the way to the final against India, where Abdul Aziz's goal gave Pakistan a 1–0 victory. Essa scored his first senior international goal in a free-kick against India, in the first match of the 2005 Pakistan-India friendly series at the Ayub National Stadium in Quetta to tie the game 1–1 with minutes to go before the final whistle. He scored again in the 3–0 win against India at the Punjab Stadium in Lahore. He was named player of series at the end.

In 2006, he captained the Pakistan under 23 side at the 2006 South Asian Games, winning another gold medal. After advancing from the group stages, Essa's strike against Nepal led Pakistan to the final against Sri Lanka, which ended in a victory for the Green Shirts thanks to a goal by Adeel Ahmed in the half time. He also captained the under-23 side at the 2006 Asian Games.

He retained his captaincy for the 2008 AFC Challenge Cup qualification campaign. Despite a 2–0 win against Chinese Taipei in the first match, Pakistan lost 7–1 to Sri Lanka, which made Pakistan's 9–2 demolition of Guam meaningless as they finished behind on points to Sri Lanka, thus failing to qualify for the main round. Because of injury, Essa had to miss the 2008 SAFF Championship.

He retired from the national team during the 2009 SAFF Championship, following a fallout with the international team manager György Kottán.

== Managerial career ==
Essa served K-Electric both as a player and assistant coach while attaining the AFC B coaching license.

He was appointed as assistant coach of the Pakistan national team in 2018, lasting during the tenure of former PFF president Faisal Saleh Hayat, who was ousted by FIFA in June 2019. He returned to K-Electric as head coach until the team got disbanded in 2020. He joined KRL as the head coach in January 2023.

In 2025, he was appointed assistant coach for the Pakistan under-17 football team for the 2025 SAFF U-17 Championship held in Colombo, Sri Lanka, under head coach Nasir Ismail.

In 2026, he was appointed head coach of Pakistan U16 for the UEFA Under-16 Development Tournament.

== Personal life ==
Essa came from a family of footballers. Two of his uncles and his two brothers played in the domestic circuit. His older brother Ahmad Shah played at the national level and younger brother Jahangir Khan played for Pakistan national under-19 team. Essa's younger cousin Kaleemullah Khan is also a footballer and represented the Pakistan national team.

On 13 August 2007, Essa was awarded the Salaam Pakistan Award alongside tennis star Aisam-ul-Haq Qureshi and female squash player Maria Toorpakai for their contributions to sport by the President of Pakistan, Pervez Musharraf. On 7 May 2009, Essa received AFC Distinguished Services Awards from FIFA President Sepp Blatter at Kuala Lumpur during the AFC 23rd Congress.

In 2009, he opened an academy at his home town in Chaman, called the Essa Khan Academy. Essa is the co-founder of Pak Afghan Clearing Agency, founded as a hybrid of a department and football club.

== Career statistics ==
=== International ===
Appearances and goals by national team and year
National team	Year	Apps	Goals
Pakistan	2001	6	0
Pakistan	2003	2	0
Pakistan	2005	8	3
Pakistan	2006	9	4
Pakistan	2007	2	0
Pakistan	2008	5	2
Pakistan	2009	8	2
Total		40	11

Scores and results list Pakistan's goal tally first, score column indicates score after each Essa goal.

List of international goals scored by Muhammad Essa
No.	Date	Venue	Opponent	Score	Result	Competition
1	12 June 2005	Ayub National Stadium, Quetta, Pakistan	India	1–1	1–1	Friendly
2	18 June 2005	Punjab Stadium, Lahore, Pakistan	India	1–0	3–0	Friendly
3	9 December 2005	People's Football Stadium, Karachi, Pakistan	Afghanistan	1–0	1–0	2005 South Asian Football Federation Gold Cup
4	1 March 2006	National Stadium, Karachi, Pakistan	United Arab Emirates	1–0	1–4	2007 AFC Asian Cup qualification
5	2 April 2006	Bangabandhu National Stadium, Dhaka, Bangladesh	Kyrgyzstan	1–0	1–0	2006 AFC Challenge Cup
6	6 April 2006	Bangabandhu National Stadium, Dhaka, Bangladesh	Macau	2–1	2–2	2006 AFC Challenge Cup
7	16 August 2006	Jinnah Sports Stadium, Islamabad, Pakistan	Oman	1–3	1–4	2007 AFC Asian Cup qualification
8	25 March 2008	Pokhara Rangasala, Pokhara, Nepal	Nepal	1–0	1–2	Friendly
9	2 April 2008	Chungshan Soccer Stadium, Taipei, Taiwan	Chinese Taipei	1–1	2–1	2008 AFC Challenge Cup qualification
10	8 December 2009	Bangabandhu National Stadium, Dhaka, Bangladesh	Bhutan	1–0	7–0	2009 SAFF Championship
11	8 December 2009	Bangabandhu National Stadium, Dhaka, Bangladesh	Bhutan	6–0	7–0	2009 SAFF Championship

== Honours ==
Pakistan Telecommunication

- Pakistan National Football Challenge Cup: 2003

Khan Research Laboratories

- Pakistan Premier League: 2009–10
- National Challenge Cup: 2009

K-Electric

- Pakistan Premier League: 2014–15

Pakistan U23

- South Asian Games Gold: 2004, 2006

== See also ==
- List of Pakistan national football team captains
