= Atiq Ullah (footballer) =

Pakistani footballer

Personal information
- Full name: Atiq Ullah
- Date of birth: January 1, 1983 (age 43)
- Place of birth: Bahawalpur, Pakistan
- Position: Midfielder

Senior career*
Years	Team	Apps	(Gls)
2005–2014	NBP FC	?	(?)
2007	Islamabad United	?	(?)

International career
2005–2009	Pakistan	10	(0)
- * Club domestic league appearances and goals

Atiq Ullah (born 1 January 1983), also known as Ateequllah, is a Pakistani former footballer who played as a midfielder.

== Club career ==
Atiq Ullah won the Super Football League with Islamabad United in 2007.

== International career ==
Atiq Ullah earned his first international cap in the 2005 against India.

== Career statistics ==
=== International ===
Appearances and goals by year and competition
National team	Year	Apps	Goals
Pakistan	2005	1	0
Pakistan	2006	5	0
Pakistan	2009	4	0
Total		10	0

== Honours ==
With Islamabad United

- Super Football League 2007
