= Mehedi Hasan Ujjal =

Bangladeshi footballer

Ujjal
Personal information
- Full name: Mehedi Hasan Ujjal
- Date of birth: 26 April 1985 (age 41)
- Place of birth: Magura Sadar, Bangladesh
- Height: 1.71 m (5 ft 7 1/2 in)
- Positions: Attacking midfielder; left midfielder; center forward

Senior career*
Years	Team	Apps	(Gls)
1999–2002	Badda Jagoroni		
2003–2011	Dhaka Abahani		
2011–2012	Mohammedan		

International career^{‡}
2000	Bangladesh U16		
2002	Bangladesh U20		
2004–2006	Bangladesh U23		(2)
2003–2011	Bangladesh	30	(0)
Medal record
Representing Bangladesh
Men's football
SAFF Championship
Winner	2003 Bangladesh
Runner-up	2005 Pakistan
- * Club domestic league appearances and goals ‡ National team caps and goals as of 25 March 2011

Mehedi Hasan Ujjal (Bengali: মেহেদী হাসান উজ্জল; born 26 April 1985) is a retired Bangladeshi professional footballer who played as an attacking midfielder. He spent majority of his career with Abahani Limited Dhaka.

Ujjal made a name for himself in the Western Union Premier Division Football League during the early 2000s, while playing for Abahani. He represented Jhenaidah Mohammedan in the 2003 National League, scoring four goals including a hat-trick against Jamalpur Jagarani Club.

He last played club football for Dhaka Mohammedan during the 2013–14 Bangladesh Premier League season. Ujjal played for the Bangladesh national team from 2003 to 2011, and was used as a creative midfielder during his tenure with the national team under numerous different coaches.

At a young age, Ujjal was trained by his uncle, Mashrur Reza Kutilm who is an ex-footballer and the father of cricketer Shakib Al Hasan.

== International goals ==
=== Bangladesh U16 ===
#	Date	Venue	Opponent	Score	Result	Competition
1.	8 September 2000	Chi Lăng Stadium, Da Nang, Vietnam	Oman	1–0	1–3	2000 AFC U-16 Championship

=== Bangladesh U23 ===
#	Date	Venue	Opponent	Score	Result	Competition
1.	30 March 2004	Rawalpindi, Pakistan	Afghanistan	1–0	2–1	2004 South Asian Games
2.	30 March 2004	Rawalpindi, Pakistan	Afghanistan	2–0	2–1	2004 South Asian Games

== Honours ==
Abahani Limited Dhaka

- Bangladesh Premier League: 2007, 2008–09, 2009–10
- Independence Day Tournament (Rajshahi): 2005

Bangladesh

- SAFF Championship: 2003
