= Abdul Aziz (footballer, born 1986) =

Pakistani footballer

Personal information
- Full name: Abdul Aziz Baloch
- Date of birth: 11 January 1986 (age 40)
- Place of birth: Karachi, Pakistan
- Position: Midfielder

Youth career
- Tanzeem Sports Gizri

Senior career*
Years	Team	Apps	(Gls)
2004	Sindh Government Press		
2004–2019	National Bank		

International career
2004–2010	Pakistan U23		
2005–2011	Pakistan	27	(0)
Medal record
Representing Pakistan
Winner	South Asian Games	2004
Winner	South Asian Games	2006
- * Club domestic league appearances and goals

Abdul Aziz Baloch (born 11 January 1986) is a Pakistani former footballer who played as a midfielder.

== Early life ==
Aziz was born on 11 January 1986 in the Lyari locality of Karachi. He started his playing career with local club Lyari Kickers, and later became part of a local Karachi club called Tanzeem Sports Gizri.

== Club career ==
Aziz initially started his career as a forward playing for National Football Championship departmental side Sindh Government Press. He then represented National Bank from 2004 till 2019, captaining the team in his last years.

== International career ==
Aziz earned his first senior international cap on 12 June 2005 which was the first game in a series of three games against India, the game finished 1–1 draw.

He was the vice-captain of the U-23 national team during the 2004, 2006 and 2010 South Asian Games, where he helped Pakistan achieve the gold medal in the first two editions. On 2004, he scored in the final against India, where his goal in the 29th minute gave Pakistan a 1–0 victory.

He was also vice-captain of the senior team.

== Career statistics ==
=== International ===
Appearances and goals by year and competition
National team	Year	Apps	Goals
Pakistan	2005	8	0
Pakistan	2006	8	0
Pakistan	2008	3	0
Pakistan	2009	7	0
Pakistan	2011	1	0
Total		27	0

== Honours ==
Pakistan U23

- South Asian Games Gold: 2004, 2006
