= Football at the 2006 South Asian Games =

2006 South Asian Games Football Event
Pakistan 2006

Tournament details
- Host country: Colombo, Sri Lanka
- Dates: 14–26 August 2006
- Teams: 8 (from 1 confederation)
- Venue: 1 (in 1 host city)

Final positions
- Champions: Pakistan (4th title)
- Runners-up: Sri Lanka
- Third place: Nepal

Tournament statistics
- Matches played: 16
- Goals scored: 36 (2.25 per match)

The Men's football tournament at 2006 South Asian Games was held across in Colombo, Sri Lanka from 14 to 26 August 2006. All matches took place at Sugathadasa Outdoor Sport Complex. India enter with their U-20 team; the other sides are U-23 teams.

== Fixtures and results ==
Results correct as of 1 December 2013.

- Times listed are UTC+05:30.

Key to colours in group tables
Group winners and runners-up advance to the semi-finals

=== Group A ===
Team	Pld	W	D	L	GF	GA	GD	Pts
Sri Lanka	3	2	0	1	5	1	+4	6
Pakistan	3	2	0	1	6	3	+3	6
Maldives	3	2	0	1	4	2	+2	6
Bhutan	3	0	0	3	0	9	–9	0

14 August 2006
18:00

Sri Lanka	1–0	Maldives
Fernando	Report

Sugathadasa Stadium, Colombo

16 August 2006

Maldives	1–0	Bhutan
Assad Ali	Report

Sugathadasa Stadium, Colombo

19 August 2006

Sri Lanka	0–1	Pakistan
	Report	Lashari

Sugathadasa Stadium, Colombo

21 August 2006

Maldives	3–1	Pakistan
Ashfaq; Ghanee	Report	Essa

Sugathadasa Stadium, Colombo
21 August 2006

Sri Lanka	4–0	Bhutan
D.A. Nimal; Pasqual Nadeeka Pushpakumara	Report

Sugathadasa Stadium, Colombo

23 August 2006

Pakistan	4–0	Bhutan
Adeel; Essa; Shahid 40', 68'	Report

Sugathadasa Stadium, Colombo

=== Group B ===
Team	Pld	W	D	L	GF	GA	GD	Pts
Nepal	3	1	2	0	7	3	+4	5
India	3	1	2	0	4	5	+1	5
Bangladesh	3	0	2	1	2	3	–1	2
Afghanistan	3	0	2	1	1	5	–4	2

14 August 2006

India	0–0	Afghanistan
	Report

Sugathadasa Stadium, Colombo
14 August 2006

Bangladesh	1–1	Nepal
Faisal 13'	Report; Report	Anjan 39'

Sugathadasa Stadium, Colombo

16 August 2006

Afghanistan	0–0	Bangladesh
	Report

Sugathadasa Stadium, Colombo
16 August 2006

Nepal	1–1	India
Shahukhala (pen.)	Report	Sushil 63'

Sugathadasa Stadium, Colombo

19 August 2006

India	2–1	Bangladesh
Sushil 11'; Branco 23'	Report	Firoz 80' (pen.)

Sugathadasa Stadium, Colombo
19 August 2006

Nepal	5–1	Afghanistan
Gurung 14'; Ju Manu 17', 44', 62'; Rai 18'	Report	Hafizullah 54'

Sugathadasa Stadium, Colombo

=== Knockout stage ===
Semi-finals
24 August – Colombo
Pakistan	2
Nepal	1
24 August – Colombo
India	1 (5)
Sri Lanka (p)	1 (6)

Final
26 August – Colombo
Sri Lanka	0
Pakistan	1
Third place
26 August – Colombo
India	0
Nepal	2

=== Semi finals ===
24 August 2006

India	1–1 (a.e.t.)	Sri Lanka
Sadlan 120'	Report	Lalramluaha 98'
Penalties
	5–6

Sugathadasa Stadium, Colombo

24 August 2006

Pakistan	2–1 (a.e.t.)	Nepal
Essa 70'	Report	Rai 30'; Anjan 55' (o.g.)

Sugathadasa Stadium, Colombo

=== Bronze medal match ===
26 August 2006

India	0–2	Nepal ( Bronze)
	Report	Rai 4'; Maharjan 13'

Sugathadasa Stadium, Colombo

=== Gold medal match ===
26 August 2006

( Silver) Sri Lanka	0–1	Pakistan ( Gold)
	Report	Adeel 45'

Sugathadasa Stadium, Colombo

== Winner ==
Football at the 2006 South Asian Games

Pakistan
Fourth title

== Final ranking ==
Rank	Team	Pld	W	D	L	GF	GA	GD	Pts
1	Pakistan	5	4	0	1	9	4	+5	12
2	Sri Lanka	5	3	0	2	6	3	+3	9
3	Nepal	5	2	2	1	10	5	+5	8
4	India	5	1	2	2	5	8	–3	5
5	Maldives	3	2	0	1	4	2	+2	6
6	Bangladesh	3	0	2	1	2	3	–1	2
7	Afghanistan	3	0	2	1	1	5	–4	2
8	Bhutan	3	0	0	3	0	9	–9	0
