= Sri Lanka national under-23 football team =

Sri Lanka U-23
- Nickname(s): සිංහ සිංහයා siṁha siṁhayā (Simha Lions)
- Association: Football Federation of Sri Lanka
- Confederation: AFC (Asia)
- Sub-confederation: SAFF (South Asia)
- Head coach: Mohamed Amanulla
- Captain: Dananju Madushan
- Top scorer: Zarwan Johar
- FIFA code: SRI
First colours	Second colours

First international
- Sri Lanka 1–0 Nepal (Islamabad, Pakistan; March 29, 2004)

Biggest win
- Sri Lanka 4–0 Bhutan (Colombo, Sri Lanka; August 21, 2006)

Biggest defeat
- Palestine 9–0 Sri Lanka (Isa Town, Bahrain; March 22, 2019); Sri Lanka 0–9 Bahrain (Isa Town, Bahrain; March 24, 2019)

South Asian Games
- Appearances: 3
- Best result: Silver Medal (2006)

The Sri Lanka national under-23 football team is the national team that participates in international football tournaments, such as the Summer Olympics and the AFC U-23 Championship representing Sri Lanka. The team has won bronze medals at the South Asian Games in 2004 and at the 2014 Lusophony Games. The Sri Lanka National U-23 Team won the silver medal at the 2006 South Asian Games, the first silver medal won by Sri Lanka at an international tournament.

Sri Lanka didn't have an official U-23 team. Before 2013, the Sri Lanka national football team participated in the Summer Olympic qualifications and other international events. Sri Lanka has yet to participate in a Summer Olympic football tournament.

== History ==
Due to the popularity of cricket in Sri Lanka, football has not been popular. But it has gained popularity with Sri Lanka's youth in recent years, and Sri Lanka's National U-23 Football team was formed as a result. In the 2010s the Sri Lanka national football team competed in international football tournaments. The Sri Lanka U-23 team has won a silver medal and two bronze medals in competitions.

The 10th edition of the South Asian Games was held in Sri Lanka in 2006. In the football tournament, Sri Lanka competed in the group stage against the Pakistan, Bhutan and Maldives U-23 football teams. Sri Lanka beat Maldives and Bhutan to qualify for the semi-final stage and beat India in penalties to qualify for the final with Pakistan. Sri Lanka won the silver medal as a result. In the 2004 tournament Sri Lanka had won the bronze medal.

Sri Lanka participated in the AFC U-23 Championship Qualifiers competition as an inexperienced football team, and failed to win a single match. They achieved a draw against Palestine, scoring their first goal in a major U-23 football tournament. They also tied with Pakistan but lost 4–0 to the powerful and experienced Syria national under-23 football team. Their fifth game was against host Saudi Arabia, and they lost 7–0, their biggest defeat in tournament play. In the last match of the qualifiers, Sri Lanka played against the Kyrgyzstan team and lost 5–0, failing to qualify for the inaugural AFC U-22 Championship tournament.

The Palestine Championship tournament was organized by the Palestinian Football Association, which invited the national U-23 teams of Palestine, Sri Lanka, Pakistan and Jordan to compete. Sri Lanka played all three teams and lost each match, failing to score a goal in the tournament.

The Sri Lanka national U-23 football team participated in the 2014 Lusophony Games. The Sri Lanka team advanced to the semi-final stage of the tournament by defeating Macau and drew against São Tomé and Príncipe. In the semi-finals Sri Lanka lost the match against Mozambique 1–0 and won the bronze medal match against Macau 3–0. This was the first time that Sri Lanka U-23 team had placed at a major international tournament.

Sri Lanka entered in the 2016 AFC U-23 Championship Qualification stage with the national U-23 teams from United Arab Emirates (UAE), Yemen and Tajikistan. Sri Lanka lost both opening games against the host UAE and Yemen 4–0 and 5–0. They lost to Tajikistan 5–1 in the last group match. Sri Lanka scored only one goal in the tournament. After losing all three matches, Sri Lanka failed to qualify for the 2016 Olympic Football Tournament.

== Competitive record ==
=== Olympic Games ===
Olympic Games finals									Olympic Games qualifications					
Hosts/year	Result	GP	W	D	L	GS	GA	GD	GP	W	D	L	GS	GA
(Brazil) 2016	Did not Qualify								3	0	0	3	1	14
(Japan) 2020	Did not Qualify								3	0	0	3	0	20
(France) 2024	Suspended								Suspended					
(United States) 2028	TBD								TBD					
Total	0/2	-	-	-	-	-	-	-	6	0	0	6	1	34

- Prior to the 2016 Olympic Games campaign, the senior national team played in qualification.

=== AFC U-23 Championship ===
AFC U-22 finals									AFC U-22 Championship qualification					
Hosts/Year	Result	GP	W	D	L	GS	GA	GD	GP	W	D	L	GS	GA
(Oman) 2013	Did not Qualify								5	0	2	3	1	17
(Qatar) 2016	Did not Qualify								3	0	0	3	1	14
(China) 2018	Withdrew								Withdrew					
(Thailand) 2020	Did not qualify								3	0	0	3	0	20
(Uzbekistan) 2022	Did not qualify								3	0	0	3	0	13
(Qatar) 2024	Suspended								Suspended					
(Saudi Arabia) 2026	Did not qualify								3	0	0	3	0	15
(Japan) 2028	To be determined								To be determined					
Total	0/8	-	-	-	-	-	-	-	11	0	2	9	2	46

=== South Asian Games ===
Year	Host	Pos.	P	W	D	L	GF	GA
2004	Pakistan	3/7	4	3	0	1	2	0
2006	Sri Lanka	2/8	5	4	0	1	6	3
2010	Bangladesh	5/8	3	1	1	1	1	2
2016	India	5/6	2	1	0	1	2	3
Total			14	9	1	4	11	8

- Prior to the 2004 South Asian Games campaign, the senior national team played in the tournament.

== Fixtures and results ==
Win Draw Lose

== Coaching staff ==
Position	Name
Head coach	(Sri Lanka) Mohamed Amanulla
Assistant coach	(Sri Lanka) Ratnam Justmin
Goalkeeping coach	(Sri Lanka) Saman Dayawansa
Fitness coach	(Sri Lanka) Marcus Ferreira
Performance analyst	(Sri Lanka) Sujan Fernando
Team doctor	(Sri Lanka) Chathura Akalanka Edirisinghe
Physiotherapist	(Sri Lanka) Saman Dayawansa
Masseur	(Sri Lanka) Ruwan Jayasuriya
Kitman	(Sri Lanka) Shabeer Perera
Media officer	(Sri Lanka) Isuru Maduwantha
Team staff	(Sri Lanka) Hiran Rathnayaka

== Squad ==
No.	Pos.	Player	Date of birth (age)	Caps	Goals	Club
1	GK	Prabath Arunasiri		2	0	(Football Federation of Sri Lanka)
12	GK	Dhanushka Rajapaksha		2	0	(Football Federation of Sri Lanka)
22	GK	Mohamed Uzman		0	0	(Football Federation of Sri Lanka)
17	DF	Barath Suresh		4	0	(Football Australia) Langwarrin SC
2	DF	Mohammed Abdullah		0	0	(Football Federation of Sri Lanka) Renown SC
6	DF	Zahi Addis		1	0	(Football Australia) Hume City FC
13	DF	Mohamed Nifras		2	0	(Football Federation of Sri Lanka)
18	DF	Tharindu Lakmal		2	0	(Football Federation of Sri Lanka)
20	DF	Chameera Sajith		2	0	(Football Federation of Sri Lanka)
4	MF	Tenuka Ranaweera	December 10, 2007 (age 18)	1	0	(Football Kenya Federation) Nairobi United
5	MF	Remiyan Muthuccumaru		2	0	(Royal Dutch Football Association) FC Emmen
7	MF	Jada Mawango		0	0	(The Football Association) Swansea City A.F.C.
10	MF	David Karunarathne(C)		3	0	(Football Federation of Sri Lanka) Colombo FC
14	MF	Aditha Menuhas		3	0	(Italian Football Federation) UC AlbinoLeffe
15	MF	M. Shahil		0	0	(Football Federation of Sri Lanka) Renown FC
21	MF	Shanaka Wijesena		1	0	(Football Federation of Sri Lanka)
8	FW	James Thomason	5 September 2004 (age 22)	0	0	(Football Australia) Melbourne City FC
9	FW	Anish Jebanathan		1	0	(Norwegian Football Federation) Funnefoss/Vormsund IL
11	FW	Shiyaam Sasiharan		0	0	(Norwegian Football Federation) Skeid Fotball
19	FW	Rahul Suresh		2	0	(Football Australia) Dandenong Thunder SC

== Honors ==
- South Asian Games:
  - Silver Medal : 2006
  - Bronze Medal : 2004

== See also ==
- Sri Lanka national football team
- Sri Lanka women's national football team
- Sri Lanka national under-20 football team
- Sri Lanka national under-17 football team
