= Imran Hashmi (footballer) =

Pakistani footballer

Personal information
- Full name: Imran Khan Hashmi
- Date of birth: 17 February 1989 (age 37)
- Place of birth: Panjgur, Pakistan
- Position: Midfielder

Senior career*
Years	Team	Apps	(Gls)
2007–2018	Pakistan Airlines		

International career
2008	Pakistan	2	(0)
- * Club domestic league appearances and goals

Imran Khan Hashmi (Urdu: عمران خان ہاشمی; born 17 February 1989) is a Pakistani former footballer who played as a midfielder.

== Early life ==
Hashmi was born in Panjgur, Balochistan.

== Club career ==
Hashmi played for PIA FC from the 2007–08 Pakistan Premier League, until 2018.

== International career ==
He was called up to the Pakistan squad during the 2008 friendlies with Nepal. He made two appearances in the 2008 AFC Challenge Cup qualification.

== Career statistics ==
=== International ===
Appearances and goals by year and competition
National team	Year	Apps	Goals
Pakistan	2008	2	0
Total		2	0
