= Super Football League =

- Organising body: Geo Super; Pakistan Football Federation
- Founded: 2007
- First season: 2007
- Folded: 2010
- Country: Pakistan
- Confederation: AFC
- Number of clubs: 5
- Last champions: Karachi Energy (2010)
- Most championships: Islamabad United; Karachi Energy (1 title each)
- Broadcaster(s): GEO Super
- Website: SFL 2007 official site SFL 2010 official site

The Super Football League, simply known as the SFL, was the first professional franchise club football league of Pakistan, organised by Geo Super in collaboration with the Pakistan Football Federation.

Five franchises participated in both editions in 2007 and 2010, and all matches were played in Karachi's Peoples Football Stadium. The SFL ran separate to the Pakistan Premier League.

== History ==
Geo TV Network and the Pakistan Football Federation came together in 2006 and began work on establishing Pakistan's first national inter-city football league to be televised on GEO Super. Geo Super reportedly signed a contract with the PFF for a period of seven years. It ran based on franchise model over a span of two months, and was one of the few televised domestic championship held in the country since its inception.

It was regarded as a parallel new professional top flight league, and for the first time the teams would be city-based and non departmental, in contrast to the Pakistan Premier League, representing Pakistan's five major cities. Players were selected after trials. The league attracted record crowds at the Peoples Football Stadium in Karachi.

Due to a lack of long term support from Pakistan Football Federation, the second edition of the Super Football League was held in summer 2010 after a gap three years, when KESC stepped in to support the venture with another SFL season and merited a second attempt in 2010. KESC also ran the Karachi Energy team, which was renamed from Karachi Bazigar.

However, the league did not continue because the organisers and sponsors reportedly did not want to work with the Pakistan Football Federation again. The reason was largely because Geo Super conducted it purely for commercial reasons, while the Pakistan Football Federation failed to cash in on it for the long term betterment of football in the country.

== Teams ==
The league was made up of five franchise teams, representatives of different major cities of Pakistan. Each team was composed of national and international players. The names of the teams were the following:

- Tribe FC Peshawar
- Islamabad United
- Lahore Lajpaals
- Quetta Zorawar
- Karachi Energy (Karachi Bazigar in 2007)

== Results ==
Year	Host	Winner	Score	Runners-up	Losing semifinalists (no third place match)
2007 Details	Karachi	Islamabad United	0–0 (a.e.t.) (4–3 pens.)	Karachi Bazigar	Quetta Zorawar Lahore Lajpaals
2010 Details	Karachi	Karachi Energy	1–0	Quetta Zorawar	Islamabad United Lahore Lajpaals

== Awards ==
=== Top scorer ===
Year	Player/s	Club	Goals	Ref.
2007	(Pakistan) Arif Mehmood	Lahore Lajpaals	8	
2010	(Pakistan) Muhammad Rasool	Karachi Energy	6	

=== Most valuable player ===
Year	Player/s	Club	Ref.
2007	(Pakistan) Muhammad Essa	Quetta Zorawar	
2010	(Pakistan) Muhammad Riaz	Islamabad United	

=== Goalkeeper of the year ===
Year	Player/s	Club	Ref.
2007	N/A	N/A	
2010	(Pakistan) Muhammad Omar	Karachi Energy	

=== Fair play award ===
Year	Club	Ref.
2007	Lahore Lajpaals	
2010	N/A	

== Records & statistics ==
As of 2 August 2010

- First match: Karachi Bazigars v Lahore Lajpaals (20 July 2007)
- Biggest winning margin: 4 goals
  - Lahore Lajpaals 4–0 Tribe FC Peshawar (16 August 2007)
- Most wins in a season: 6 matches – Lahore Lajpaals
- Most losses in a season: 6 matches – Tribe FC Peshawar
- Most goals in a match: 5 goals
  - Tribe FC Peshawar 2–3 Lahore Lajpaals (28 July 2007)
  - Quetta Zorawar 4–1 Islamabad United (9 August 2007)
- Most goals in a match by a single player: 3 goals – Arif Mehmood (Lahore Lajpaals)
  - Lahore Lajpaals 4–0 Tribe FC Peshawar (16 August 2007)
- Most goals in a season: 8 goals – Arif Mehmood (Lahore Lajpaals)
- Most goals scored by a team in a season: 15 goals – Lahore Lajaals
- Fewest goals scored by a team in a season: 6 goals – Tribe FC Peshawar
- Most goals conceded by a team in a season: 18 goals – Tribe FC Peshawar
- Fewest goals conceded by a team in a season: 5 goals – Karachi Bazigars

== See also ==
- Football in Pakistan
