= Football at the 2004 South Asian Games =

2004 South Asian Games Football Event
Pakistan 2004

Tournament details
- Host country: Islamabad, Pakistan
- Dates: 28 March – 5 April 2004
- Teams: 8 (from 1 confederation)
- Venues: 3 (in 3 host cities)

Final positions
- Champions: Pakistan (3rd title)
- Runners-up: India
- Third place: Sri Lanka

Tournament statistics
- Matches played: 13
- Goals scored: 20 (1.54 per match)
- Top scorer: (Pakistan) Muhammad Essa (4 goals)

Men's football tournament at 2004 South Asian Games was held across 3 venues in Pakistan from March 28 to April 6, 2004. The tournament was delayed twice due to developments related to Pakistan's support as a major non-NATO ally in the fight against terrorism against the Afghan Taliban and Al-Qaeda in Afghanistan and US foreign policy at the time following 9/11. Pakistan won the football tournament, defeating India 1–0, for its third title.

The tournament was the first to introduce an under-23 tournament system for the football events.

== Group stage ==
- Times listed are UTC+05:00.

Key to colours in group tables
Group winners and runners-up advance to the semi-finals

=== Group A ===
Team	Pld	W	D	L	GF	GA	GD	Pts
India	3	2	1	0	3	0	+3	7
Pakistan	3	2	0	1	5	1	+4	6
Bangladesh	3	1	1	1	2	2	+0	4
Afghanistan	3	0	0	3	1	7	–6	0

28 March 2004

India	0–0	Bangladesh
	Report

Army Stadium, Rawalpindi
28 March 2004

Pakistan	3–0	Afghanistan
Essa 5', 62'; Farooq 52'	Report

Qayyum Stadium, Peshawar

30 March 2004

Bangladesh	2–1	Afghanistan
Ujjal 2', 41'	Report	Omidwar 75'

Army Stadium, Rawalpindi
30 March 2004

Pakistan	0–1	India
	Report	Roypakias 72' (pen.)

Army Stadium, Rawalpindi

1 April 2004

Pakistan	1–0	Bangladesh
Essa 86' (pen.)	Report

Jinnah Stadium, Islamabad
1 April 2004

India	2–0	Afghanistan
Zirsanga 42'; Marlanki 75'	Report

Jinnah Stadium, Islamabad

=== Group B ===
Bhutan won a toss against Nepal for 2nd place.

Team	Pld	W	D	L	GF	GA	GD	Pts
Sri Lanka	2	2	0	0	2	0	+2	6
Bhutan	2	0	1	1	0	1	–1	1
Nepal	2	0	1	1	0	1	–1	1
Maldives	Withdrew							

27 March 2004

Nepal	0–0	Bhutan
	Report

Army Stadium, Rawalpindi

29 March 2004

Sri Lanka	1–0	Nepal
Azmeer 62'	Report

Army Stadium, Rawalpindi

31 March 2004

Sri Lanka	1–0	Bhutan
Kosgodage 13'	Report

Army Stadium, Rawalpindi

== Knockout stage ==
Semi-finals
3 April – Islamabad
India	4
Bhutan	1
3 April – Islamabad
Sri Lanka	0 (4)
Pakistan (p)	0 (5)

Final
5 April – Islamabad
India	0
Pakistan	1
Third place
5 April – Islamabad
Bhutan	0 (2)
Sri Lanka (p)	0 (3)

=== Semi finals ===
3 April 2004

India	4–1	Bhutan
Roy 15'; Sunil 33', 76'; Pradeep 90'		Chophe 37'

Jinnah Stadium, Islamabad

3 April 2004

Sri Lanka	1–1 (a.e.t.)	Pakistan
Akram 86' (o.g.)		Essa 64'
Penalties
	4–5

Jinnah Stadium, Islamabad

=== Bronze medal play-off ===
5 April 2004

Bhutan	0–0 (a.e.t.)	Sri Lanka
Penalties
Subba (penalty scored); Dhendup (penalty scored)	2–3	(penalty scored) C. M. Weerasingha; (penalty scored) T. Rangana; (penalty scored) M. A. Dilshan

Jinnah Stadium, Islamabad

=== Gold medal match ===
5 April 2004

India	0–1	Pakistan
		A. Aziz 18'

Jinnah Stadium, Islamabad
Attendance: 37,000

== Winner ==
Football at the 2004 South Asian Games

Pakistan
Third title

== Goalscorers ==
There have been 20 goals scored in 13 matches, for an average of 1.54 goals per match.

4 goals

- (Pakistan) Muhammad Essa

2 goals

- (India) Sunil Chhetri
- (Bangladesh) Mehedi Hasan Ujjal

1 goal

- (Pakistan) Farooq Shah
- (Afghanistan) Rozeddin Omidwar
- (India) Jerry Zirsanga
- (India) Sutang Marlanki
- (India) Debabrata Roypakias
- (Sri Lanka) Mohammed Azmeer
- (Sri Lanka) Siyaguna Kosgodage
- (India) Debabrata Roy
- (India) Pappachen Pradeep
- (Bhutan) Chema Chophe
- (Pakistan) Abdul Aziz

1 own goal

- (Pakistan) Naveed Akram (against Sri Lanka)

== Final ranking ==
Rank	Team	Pld	W	D	L	GF	GA	GD	Pts
1	Pakistan	5	4	0	1	7	2	+5	13
2	India	5	3	2	0	7	1	+6	11
3	Sri Lanka	4	3	1	0	3	1	+2	9
4	Bhutan	4	0	1	3	1	5	-4	1
5	Bangladesh	3	1	1	1	2	2	+0	4
6	Nepal	2	0	1	1	0	1	–1	1
7	Afghanistan	3	0	0	3	1	7	–6	0
—	Maldives	Withdrew							
