= Football at the South Asian Games =

- Organiser(s): SAOC
- Founded: Men: 1985; Women: 2010
- Region: South Asia
- Current champions: M: Nepal; W: India (2019)
- Most championships: M: Nepal & Pakistan (4 titles each); W: India (3 titles)
- 2027 (M), 2027 (W)

Football has been a sport at the South Asian Games since it commenced in 1984. Since the 2004 South Asian Games, the age limit for men's teams is under 23, plus up to three overaged players for each squad, which is the same as the age limit in football competitions at the Summer Olympics and Asian Games. Nepal and Pakistan are currently the most successful countries in the Men's event with 4 Gold Medals each while India is the most successful in Women's event with 3 Gold Medals.

Women's football tournaments were introduced in 2010.

== Results ==
=== Men's tournament ===
Accurate as of 18 September 2026.

Year	Host	Final			Third Place Match		
Year	Host	(gold) Gold	Score	(silver) Silver	(bronze) Bronze	Score	Fourth Place
1984	Kathmandu, Nepal	Nepal	4−2	Bangladesh	Maldives	unclear whether a match for third place was held; Maldives were awarded bronze, possibly because of the group record	
1985	Dhaka, Bangladesh	India	1−1 (4–1 p)	Bangladesh	Nepal	2–2 (3–2 p)	Pakistan
1987	Calcutta, India	India	1−0	Nepal	Pakistan	1–0	Bangladesh
1989	Islamabad, Pakistan	Pakistan	1−0	Bangladesh	India	2–1	Nepal
1991	Colombo, Sri Lanka	Pakistan	2−0	Maldives	Bangladesh	2–0	Nepal
1993	Dhaka, Bangladesh	Nepal	2−2 (4–3 p)	India	Sri Lanka	3–1	Maldives
1995	Madras, India	India	1−0	Bangladesh	Sri Lanka	0–0 (5–3 p)	Nepal
1999	Kathmandu, Nepal	Bangladesh	1−0	Nepal	India	3–1	Maldives

Since 2004 the tournament has been held for U-23 teams.

Year	Host		Final				Third Place Match		
Year	Host		(gold) Gold	Score	(silver) Silver		(bronze) Bronze	Score	Fourth Place
2004	Islamabad, Pakistan		Pakistan	1−0	India U-20		Sri Lanka	0–0 (3–2 p)	Bhutan
2006	Colombo, Sri Lanka		Pakistan	1−0	Sri Lanka		Nepal	2–0	India U-20
2010	Dhaka & Chattogram, Bangladesh		Bangladesh	4−0	Afghanistan		Maldives	0–0 (3–1 p)	India U-20
2016	Guwahati & Shillong, India		Nepal	2−1	India		Bangladesh	2–2 (5–4 p)	Maldives
2019	Kathmandu & Pokhara, Nepal		Nepal	2−1	Bhutan		Bangladesh	As a result of Round-robin	Maldives
2027	Islamabad, Lahore & Peshawar, Pakistan	TBD	TBD	TBD	TBD	—	TBD		

=== Women's tournament ===
Accurate as of 18 September 2026.

Year	Host		Final				Third Place Match		
Year	Host		(gold) Gold	Score	(silver) Silver		(bronze) Bronze	Score	Fourth Place
2010	Dhaka, Bangladesh		India	3−1	Nepal		Bangladesh	As a result of Round-robin	Pakistan
2016	Guwahati & Shillong, India		India	2−1	Nepal		Bangladesh	As a result of Round-robin	Maldives
2019	Kathmandu & Pokhara, Nepal		India	2−0	Nepal		Maldives	As a result of Round-robin	Sri Lanka
2027	Islamabad, Lahore & Peshawar, Pakistan	TBD	TBD	TBD	TBD	—	TBD		

== Medal table ==
=== Men's medal table ===
Rank	Nation	Gold	Silver	Bronze	Total
1	Nepal/ Nepal U-23	4	2	2	8
2	Pakistan/ Pakistan U-23	4	0	1	5
3	India/ India U-23/ India U-20	3	3	2	8
4	Bangladesh/ Bangladesh U-23	2	4	3	9
5	Sri Lanka/ Sri Lanka U-23	0	1	3	4
6	Maldives/ Maldives U-23	0	1	2	3
7	Afghanistan U-23	0	1	0	1
7	Bhutan/ Bhutan U-23	0	1	0	1
Totals (8 entries)		13	13	13	39

=== Women's medal table ===
Rank	Nation	Gold	Silver	Bronze	Total
1	India	3	0	0	3
2	Nepal	0	3	0	3
3	Bangladesh	0	0	2	2
4	Maldives	0	0	1	1
Totals (4 entries)		3	3	3	9

=== Total ===
Rank	Nation	Gold	Silver	Bronze	Total
1	India (IND)	6	3	2	11
2	Nepal (NEP)	4	5	2	11
3	Pakistan (PAK)	4	0	1	5
4	Bangladesh (BAN)	2	4	5	11
5	Maldives (MDV)	0	1	3	4
5	Sri Lanka (SRI)	0	1	3	4
7	Afghanistan (AFG)	0	1	0	1
7	Bhutan (BHU)	0	1	0	1
Totals (8 entries)		16	16	16	48

== See also ==
- South Asian Games
- SAFF Championship
- SAFF Women's Championship
