= 2004 South Asian Games =

IX South Asian Games
- Host city: Islamabad, Pakistan
- Motto: "Rising Above"
- Organizer: Pakistan Olympic Association
- Edition: 9
- Nations: 8
- Debuting countries: Afghanistan
- Events: 15 Sports
- Opening: 29 March 2004
- Closing: 7 April 2004
- Opened by: Pervez Musharraf, President of Pakistan
- Main venue: Jinnah Stadium
- Website: 2004 Islamabad

The 2004 South Asian Games, officially known as the IX South Asian Federation Games, were held in Islamabad, Pakistan from 29 March to 7 April 2004. Originally scheduled for 2001, the games were postponed in the wake of the 9/11 attacks on the United States in which the US later declared Pakistan a major non-NATO ally. The slogan for the Games was Rising Above. For the first time, Afghanistan participated in the Games.

== Postponements ==
The games in Islamabad were originally to be held from 6 to 15 October 2001, but they were inevitably rescheduled (with the location remaining unchanged) for 30 March 2002 due to the invasion of Afghanistan. They were postponed again due to tensions between Pakistan and India. They were the set to be held from 29 March to 6 April 2003. Afghanistan was invited for the games, however Bhutan and India withdrew.

The entire event was postponed for the third time due to the war against Iraq. Pakistan retained the organisational authority, despite Sri Lanka being offered to host the games for 2004. Sri Lanka received the honour when they hosted the 10th edition of the Games in 2006. The 9th edition was then rescheduled in Pakistan, for 29 March through 7 April 2004. Despite not entering in the previous schedule, Bhutan and India now joined the Games, though the Maldives withdrew from the football tournament.

== The Games ==
=== Participating nations ===
The following eight countries competed.

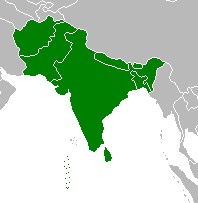
Participating nations

- Afghanistan
- Bangladesh
- Bhutan
- India
- Maldives
- Nepal
- Pakistan
- Sri Lanka

=== Sports ===
- Athletics
- Badminton
- Boxing
- Football
- Kabaddi
- Judo
- Rowing (debut)
- Shooting
- Squash
- Swimming
- Table tennis
- Taekwondo
- Volleyball
- Weightlifting
- Wrestling

== Medal tally ==
Host nation Pakistan finished in 2nd place with a total of 143 medals (38 gold, 55 silver, and 50 bronze).

* Host nation (Pakistan)

Rank	Nation	Gold	Silver	Bronze	Total
1	India (IND)	103	57	32	192
2	Pakistan (PAK)*	38	55	50	143
3	Sri Lanka (SRI)	17	32	57	106
4	Nepal (NEP)	7	6	20	33
5	Bangladesh (BAN)	3	13	24	40
6	Afghanistan (AFG)	1	3	28	32
7	Bhutan (BHU)	1	3	2	6
8	Maldives (MDV)	0	0	0	0
Totals (8 entries)		170	169	213	552

== See also ==
- South Asian Games celebrated in Pakistan
  - 1989 South Asian Games – Islamabad
  - 2004 South Asian Games – Islamabad
  - 2027 South Asian Games – Islamabad, Lahore, Peshawar
- South Asian Games
