= List of football clubs in Pakistan =

This is a list of football clubs based in Pakistan which have competed in the leagues and divisions of the Pakistan football league system.

== List of clubs grouped by league and province ==
=== Azad Kashmir ===
| Club | Town or City | League |
|---|---|---|
| Eleven Star (Note: Participated at the 2012 PFF League) | Rawalakot | TBA |
| Pilot FC (Note: Participated at the 2005 National Football Challenge Cup) | Mirpur | TBA |

=== Balochistan ===
| Club | Town or City | League |
|---|---|---|
| Afghan Chaman | Chaman | TBA |
| Muslim | Chaman | TBA |
| Young Ittefaq | Chaman | TBA |
| Pak Afghan | Chaman | TBA |
| Baloch Quetta | Quetta | TBA |
| Hazara FC Quetta | Quetta | TBA |
| Alamo Muhammadan (Note: Participated at the 2014 PFF League) | Quetta | TBA |
| Afghan FC Quetta (Note: Participated at the 2009–10 PFF League) | Quetta | TBA |
| Milli Afghan | Quetta | TBA |
| Afghan Sports (Note: Participated at the 2010 PFF League, 2011 PFF League, and 2012 PFF League) | Quetta | TBA |
| Baloch Nushki | Nushki | TBA |
| Balaach FC (Note: Participated at the 2012 PFF League) | Nushki | TBA |
| Mansab FC (Note: Participated at the 2011 PFF League) | Kharan | TBA |
| Suraj FC (Note: Participated at the 2010 PFF League, but withdrew at the end) | Panjgur | TBA |
| Baloch Dalbandin (Note: Participated at the 2013 PFF League, and 2014 PFF League) | Dalbandin | TBA |

=== Gilgit Baltistan ===
| Club | Town or City | League |
|---|---|---|
| Gilgit FC (Note: Participated at the 2010 PFF League, but withdrew at the end) | Gilgit | TBA |

=== Islamabad Capital Territory ===
| Club | Town or City | League |
|---|---|---|
| Huma | Islamabad | TBA |
| POPO | Islamabad | TBA |
| Mehran | Islamabad | TBA |
| Ravi | Islamabad | TBA |
| Quaid-e-Azam FC | Islamabad | TBA |

=== Khyber Pakhtunkhwa ===
| Club | Town or City | League |
|---|---|---|
| Young Eleven | Dera Ismail Khan | TBA |
| Aatish | Tank | TBA |
| Mardan FC | Mardan | TBA |
| Mardan Blue Star | Mardan | TBA |
| Karwan FC (Note: Participated at the 2008–09 PFF League, but withdrew at the end) | Lakki Marwat | TBA |
| Hazara Zamindar (Note: Participated at the 2009–10 PFF League) | Abbottabad | TBA |
| Youth League FC | Abbottabad | TBA |
| Nowshera Eleven (Note: Participated at the 2008–09 PFF League) | Nowshera | TBA |

=== Punjab ===
| Club | Town or City | League |
|---|---|---|
| Lyallpur | Faisalabad | TBA |
| Wohaib | Lahore | TBA |
| SA Gardens | Lahore | TBA |
| Raiders | Lahore | TBA |
| City FC (Note: Participated at the 2009–10 PFF League) | Lahore | TBA |
| Young Blood FC | Sahiwal | TBA |
| Chand Layyah | Layyah | TBA |
| Green Star | Okara | TBA |
| Al Hilal FC (Note: Participated at the 2010 PFF League) | Arif Wala | TBA |
| Munir Shaheed FC (Note: Participated at the 2009–10 PFF League) | Kasur | TBA |

=== Sindh ===
| Club | Town or City | League |
|---|---|---|
| Karachi United | Karachi | TBA |
| Karachi Kickers | Karachi | TBA |
| Mauripur Baloch | Karachi | TBA |
| Keamari Muhammadan | Karachi | TBA |
| Keamari Union | Karachi | TBA |
| Naka Muhammadan | Karachi | TBA |
| Baloch Eleven | Karachi | TBA |
| Jeay Laal | Thatta | TBA |
| Qureshi FC (Note: Participated at the 2009–10 PFF League) | Hyderabad | TBA |
| Young Baloch FC (Note: Participated at the 2008–09 PFF League) | Hyderabad | TBA |

== Defunct and inactive clubs ==
The following is a list of clubs that have competed within the leagues and divisions of the Pakistan football league system, but have been disbanded or inactive for a long while as evidenced by the Clubs & Academies List.

| Club | Town or City |
|---|---|
| Rangers | Lahore |
| Panther FC | Faisalabad |
| PMC Club Athletico Faisalabad | Faisalabad |
| Jinnah Gymkhana | Karachi |
| Usmania | Peshawar |
| Bannu Red (Note: Participated at the 2006 PFF National League, and 2007–08 PFF League) | Bannu |
| FATA FC (Note: Participated at the 2011 PFF League) | Federally Administered Tribal Areas |
| Star FC (Note: Participated at the 2010 PFF League) | Azad Kashmir |

== Franchise clubs ==
=== Defunct ===
The following clubs competed in the franchise based Super Football League.

| Club | Town or City |
|---|---|
| Islamabad United FC | Islamabad |
| Karachi Energy FC (Karachi Bazigar) | Karachi |
| Lahore Lajpaals FC | Lahore |
| Quetta Zorawar FC | Quetta |
| Tribe FC | Peshawar |

== Departmental teams ==
- Allied Bank Limited
- Ashraf Sugar Mills
- Crescent Textile Mills
- Gwadar Port Authority
- Higher Education Commission
- Habib Bank Limited
- Karachi Port Trust
- Karachi Metropolitan Corporation
- Khan Research Laboratories
- K-Electric
- National Bank
- Pakistan Combined Services
- Pakistan Air Force
- Pakistan Army
- Pakistan Automobiles Corporation
- Pakistan Customs
- Pakistan International Airlines
- Pakistan Navy
- Pakistan Police
- Pakistan Railways
- Pakistan Steel
- Pakistan Telecommunication
- Pakistan Television
- Pak Elektron Limited
- Pakistan Civil Aviation Authority
- Pakistan Public Works Department
- Sindh Government Press
- Social Welfare FT
- Sui Northern Gas
- Sui Southern Gas
- WAPDA
- Zarai Taraqiati Bank Limited

== Regional teams ==
Regional teams representing provincial and divisional associations of Pakistan featured regularly at the National Football Championship, the premier football tournament in the country from 1948 till 2003, when the Pakistan Premier League was introduced. With the inception of the newly formed league, provincial and divisional teams were phased out, however provincial teams have continued their participation in the National Games of Pakistan.

=== Provincial teams ===
- Punjab football team
- Sindh football team
- Balochistan football team
- North-West Frontier Province football team
- East Pakistan football team

=== Capital territory teams ===
- Karachi football team
- Islamabad football team

=== Princely State teams ===
- Bahawalpur State football team

=== Divisional teams ===
- Karachi Division football team
- Dacca Division football team
- Peshawar Division football team
- Chittagong Division football team
- Quetta Division football team
- Lahore Division football team
- Malakand Division football team
- Rawalpindi Division football team
- Multan Division football team
- Kalat Division football team
- Khairpur Division football team

== See also ==
- Pakistan Premier League
- PFF League
- National Football Championship
- Super Football League
- Pakistani football clubs in Asian competitions
