= 2004–05 in Pakistani football =

Football in Pakistan
- Season: 2004–05

Men's football
- Premier League: WAPDA
- Football Federation League: National Bank
- National Football Challenge Cup: Pakistan Telecommunication

The 2004–05 season was the 56th season of competitive football in Pakistan.

== Overview ==
- 2004–05 was the first season to feature the re-branded and redesigned Pakistan Premier League. The National Football League was renamed the Pakistan Premier League, featuring league system replacing the old group stage and knockout system.
- Naka Muhammadan suffered financial problems, withdrew from the league and came back to complete the remaining matches and folded at the ended at the end of season.
- Allied Bank folded their team at the end of season.

== Teams ==
=== Dissolved ===
- Allied Bank folded their team at the end of the season, after refusing to renew contracts of some players.
- Naka Muhammadan folded at the end of the season owing to financial reasons.

== Internationals ==
=== Friendlies ===
12 June International Friendly	Pakistan	1–1	India	Quetta, Pakistan
17:00 PST	Essa 78'	Report	Chhetri 65'	Stadium: Ayub National Stadium; Attendance: 20,000; Referee: Jehangir Khan

16 June International Friendly	Pakistan	0–1	India	Peshawar, Pakistan
20:30 PST		Report	MA Abdul Hakkim 67'	Stadium: Qayyum Stadium; Attendance: 15,000; Referee: Imtiaz Ali Shah

18 June International Friendly	Pakistan	3–0	India	Lahore, Pakistan
20:30 PST	Essa 2'; Tanveer 45+1'; Mehmood 46'	Report		Stadium: Punjab Stadium; Attendance: 11,000; Referee: Muhammad Asif Kiyani

== Club competitions ==
=== Pakistan Premier League ===
Pos	Team	Pld	W	D	L	GF	GA	GD	Pts	Qualification or relegation
1	WAPDA	30	23	5	2	98	12	+86	74	Qualification to 2005 AFC President's Cup
2	Pakistan Army	30	23	5	2	98	16	+82	74	
3	Khan Research Laboratories	30	23	4	3	98	24	+74	73	
4	Karachi Port Trust	30	18	7	5	68	34	+34	61	
5	PTCL	30	18	6	6	63	29	+34	60	
6	Pakistan Navy	30	14	11	5	62	28	+34	53	
7	Habib Bank	30	14	7	9	67	35	+32	49	
8	Allied Bank	30	15	3	12	52	40	+12	48	Relegation to 2005–06 PFF National League
9	Afghan Chaman	30	10	7	13	43	46	−3	37	
10	Wohaib	30	9	3	18	37	53	−16	30	
11	Panther Club (Note: Panther were saved from relegation as Allied Bank dissolved their team at the end of the season, saving Panther from relegation due to them being the best placed team in relegation zone.)	30	8	6	16	43	67	−24	30	
12	Young Eleven	30	7	4	19	38	90	−52	25	Relegation to 2005–06 PFF National League
13	Mauripur Baloch	30	6	4	20	25	64	−39	22	Relegation to 2005–06 PFF National League
14	Baloch Quetta	30	5	5	20	26	62	−36	20	Relegation to 2005–06 PFF National League
15	Naka Muhammadan	30	5	0	25	32	154	−122	15	Relegation to 2005–06 PFF National League
16	Mardan	30	3	1	26	20	116	−96	10	Relegation to 2005–06 PFF National League

Updated to match(es) played on 13 October 2004. Source: rsssf
Rules for classification: 1) points; 2) head-to-head points; 3) head-to-head goal difference; 4) goal difference; 5) number of goals scored; 6) drawing of lots

=== Football Federation League ===
Pos	Team	Pld	W	D	L	GF	GA	GD	Pts	Qualification or relegation
1	National Bank	6	3	2	1	9	5	+4	11	Promotion to 2005–06 Pakistan Premier League
2	Pakistan Public Work Department	6	2	2	2	7	8	−1	8	Promotion to 2005–06 Pakistan Premier League
3	Pakistan Railways	6	1	3	2	6	7	−1	6	
4	Pakistan Airforce	6	1	3	2	3	6	−3	6	

Updated to match(es) played on 13 October 2004. Source: rsssf
Rules for classification: 1) points; 2) head-to-head points; 3) head-to-head goal difference; 4) goal difference; 5) number of goals scored; 6) drawing of lots

=== National Football Challenge Cup ===
5 August 2005
19:00 PST

WAPDA	1–2	Pakistan Telecommunication
Syed Raza 66'	Report	Adeel Ahmed 11'; M. Ejaz Ghoza 68'

Army Stadium, Rawalpindi
