= Young Blood F.C. =

Football Club

Young Blood
- Full name: Young Blood Football Club
- Nickname: Youngs
- Short name: YB
- Founded: 1983; 43 years ago
- Ground: Ali Rai Nawaz Stadium
- Capacity: 5,000

Young Blood F.C. is a football club based in Sahiwal, Pakistan. The club competed one season 2010 in the Pakistan Premier League, the top tier of the Pakistan football league system. The club has his home ground at the 5,000-capacity Ali Rai Nawaz Stadium.

== History ==
The club was established in 1983. Former Pakistan national football team goalkeeper Noman Ibrahim's father played a key role in establishing the club. Noman also later served as goalkeeping coach of the club.

After being crowned champions of the 2009–10 PFF League, the club was promoted to the Pakistan Premier League. In 17 December 2010, the club struck twice in the last 19 minutes to edge out Baloch Quetta by 3–1 in the club phase final at Punjab University Ground, in Lahore. The club also came close to winning the overall PFF League final but lost to Sui Southern Gas at home venue on 6 January 2010. It became the eleventh local club of Pakistan to appear in Pakistan Premier League in a tournament dominated by departmental teams during that time, with others being Afghan Chaman, Wohaib, Panther FC, PMC Club Athletico, Young Eleven, Naka Muhammadan, Mauripur Baloch, Baloch Quetta, Mardan FC and Baloch Nushki. The feat resulted in nine players of the squad making it to the different age-based and other Pakistan national teams.

However, the club ended at the bottom of the table in their first year in the top flight, being relegated straight away to the second-tier division.

== Stadium ==
The Ali Rai Nawaz Stadium, near Fareed Town Police Station in Sahiwal serves as the team home stadium.

== Competitive record ==
The club's competitive records since the 2009–10 season are listed below.

Season	Div	Tms	Pos	National Challenge Cup	AFC President's Cup	AFC Cup
2009–10	PFF League	18	1	DNP	DNP	DNP
2010–11	Pakistan Premier League	16	16	DNP	DNP	DNP
2011–12	PFF League	17	Final group stage	DNP	DNP	DNP
2012–13	PFF League	20	Final group stage	DNP	DNP	DNP
2013–14	PFF League	24	Group stage	DNP	DNP	DNP

== Honours ==
- PFF League
  - Champions (1): 2009–10
