= Pakistani football clubs in Asian competitions =

Pakistani football clubs have entered Asian association football competitions (AFC Champions League and AFC Cup) since the 1980s.

== Who qualifies for Asian club championships ==
Competition	Who Qualifies	Teams
AFC Challenge League Qualifying Stage (from the 2024–25 season)	Pakistan Premier League winner	1

== History ==
=== Early Asian Competitions (1985–2002) ===
Pakistan made its debut in Asian club competitions in the 1985–86 Asian Club Championship, when Pakistan International Airlines qualified as winners of the 1984 Inter-Provincial Championship. In the next 1986 Asian Club Championship, Habib Bank entered the competition as champions of the same 1985 Inter-Provincial Championship. From 1987 onwards, the National Football Championship winners represented Pakistan in Asia, including Pakistan Air Force (1987), Punjab (1989–90), Pakistan Airlines (1990–91), WAPDA (1991–92), and Allied Bank (1998–99). Crescent Textile Mills featured twice, in 1988–89 and 1995–96, based on their National Championship victories. However, anomalies occurred when clubs without national domestic honours, such as Wohaib (1992–93) and Defence FC (1993–94), were nominated instead. All Pakistani entrants competed in the qualifying stages, with the sole exception of Wohaib FC, who became the only club to progress to the group stage.

A separate Asian Cup Winners' Cup was introduced in 1990 intended for domestic cup champions. Pakistan sent National Football Championship winners Punjab (1990–91) and Pakistan Airlines (1998–99). National Departmental Championship winners Karachi Port Trust represented Pakistan in 1991–92, and President PFF Cup runners-up KRL in 2000–01. Other entries, such as PIA (1992–93), and Youth League FC (1993–94), did not qualify through domestic cup success and were irregular nominations.

=== 2005–present ===
From 2005 onwards, winners of the Pakistan Premier League have represented the country in Asian competitions. Most entries were in the AFC President’s Cup (2005–2014), where KRL reached the 2013 final. Since the President’s Cup was abolished, Pakistani champions K-Electric attempted the AFC Cup at the 2016 edition.

From the 2024–25 season, the league winner enters the AFC Challenge League qualifying stage.

== Asian Champion Club Tournament/Asian Club Championship/AFC Champions League ==
Asian Club Championship
Season	Round	Team	Result	Opponent	Venue
1985–86	Qualifying Stage	Pakistan Airlines	0–3	(Bangladesh) Abahani Krira Chakra	Colombo, Sri Lanka
1985–86	Qualifying Stage	Pakistan Airlines	6–1	(Maldives) Club Valencia	Colombo, Sri Lanka
1985–86	Qualifying Stage	Pakistan Airlines	0–2	(India) East Bengal	Colombo, Sri Lanka
1985–86	Qualifying Stage	Pakistan Airlines	2–2	(Sri Lanka) Saunders SC	Colombo, Sri Lanka
1985–86	Qualifying Stage	Pakistan Airlines	0–0	(Nepal) New Road Team	Colombo, Sri Lanka
1986–87	Qualifying Stage	(Pakistan) Habib Bank	0–7	(Iran) Malavan	Colombo, Sri Lanka
1986–87	Qualifying Stage	(Pakistan) Habib Bank	1–2	(Sri Lanka) Saunders SC	Colombo, Sri Lanka
1986–87	Qualifying Stage	(Pakistan) Habib Bank	2–2	(Maldives) Victory SC	Colombo, Sri Lanka
1987–88	Qualifying Stage	Pakistan Air Force	1–4	(India) Mohun Bagan	Dhaka, Bangladesh
1987–88	Qualifying Stage	Pakistan Air Force	1–3	(Bangladesh) Dhaka Mohammedan	Dhaka, Bangladesh
1987–88	Qualifying Stage	Pakistan Air Force	1–4	(Nepal) Manang Marsyangdi	Dhaka, Bangladesh
1987–88	Qualifying Stage	Pakistan Air Force	0–10	(Iraq) Al Rasheed	Dhaka, Bangladesh
1988–89	Qualifying Stage	(Pakistan) Crescent Textile Mills	0–8	(India) Mohun Bagan	Kolkata, India
1988–89	Qualifying Stage	(Pakistan) Crescent Textile Mills	1–8	(Oman) Fanja	Kolkata, India
1988–89	Qualifying Stage	(Pakistan) Crescent Textile Mills	2–1	(Nepal) Kathmandu SC	Kolkata, India
1989–90	Qualifying Stage	(Pakistan) Punjab	0–2	(Oman) Fanja	Muscat, Oman
1989–90	Qualifying Stage	(Pakistan) Punjab	0–0	(India) Salgaocar	Muscat, Oman
1989–90	Qualifying Stage	(Pakistan) Punjab	1–1	(Nepal) Kathmandu SC	Muscat, Oman
1990–91	Qualifying Stage	Pakistan Airlines	1–0	(Nepal) Ranipokhari	Quetta, Pakistan
1990–91	Qualifying Stage	Pakistan Airlines	0–0	(Oman) Al-Nasr	Quetta, Pakistan
1991–92	Qualifying Stage	(Pakistan) WAPDA	0–5	(Bangladesh) Dhaka Mohammedan	Dhaka, Bangladesh
1991–92	Qualifying Stage	(Pakistan) WAPDA	0–0	(Bangladesh) Dhaka Mohammedan	Pakistan
1992–93	Qualifying Stage	(Pakistan) Wohaib	1–2	(Maldives) Club Valencia	Malé, Maldives
1992–93	Qualifying Stage	(Pakistan) Wohaib	6–2	(Maldives) Club Valencia	Lahore, Pakistan
1992–93	Qualifying Stage	(Pakistan) Wohaib	0–0	(Bangladesh) Brothers Union	Dhaka, Bangladesh
1992–93	Qualifying Stage	(Pakistan) Wohaib	2–0	(Bangladesh) Brothers Union	Lahore, Pakistan
1992–93	Group stage	(Pakistan) Wohaib	0–10	(United Arab Emirates) Al Wasl	Manama, Bahrain
1992–93	Group stage	(Pakistan) Wohaib	1–1	(Iran) PAS Tehran	Manama, Bahrain
1993–94	Qualifying Stage	(Pakistan) Defence FC	0–5	Oman Club	Muscat, Oman
1993–94	Qualifying Stage	(Pakistan) Defence FC	n/p^{1}	Oman Club	
1994–95	None Entered				
1995–96	Qualifying Stage	(Pakistan) Crescent Textile Mills	2–1	(Sri Lanka) Saunders SC	Unknown
1995–96	Qualifying Stage	(Pakistan) Crescent Textile Mills	3–0^{2}	(Sri Lanka) Saunders SC	Unknown
1995–96	Qualifying Stage	(Pakistan) Crescent Textile Mills	1–9	(Japan) Verdy Kawasaki	Unknown
1995–96	Qualifying Stage	(Pakistan) Crescent Textile Mills	0–3^{3}	(Japan) Verdy Kawasaki	Unknown
1996–97	None Entered				
1997–98	None Entered				
1998–99	Qualifying Stage	(Pakistan) Allied Bank	w/o^{4}	(Sri Lanka) Saunders SC	
1999–00	None Entered				
2000–01	None Entered				
2001–02	None Entered				
AFC Champions League
2002–03	None Entered				
2004	None Entered				

^{1} The match was played over one leg due to civil unrest in Pakistan.

^{2} Saunders withdrew in 2nd leg, default 3–0 to Crescent Mills.

^{3} Crescent withdrew in 2nd leg, default 3–0 to Verdy Kawasaki.

^{4} Allied Bank Limited withdrew.

== Asian Cup Winners' Cup ==
Season	Round	Team	Result	Opponent	Venue
1990–91	First Round	(Pakistan) Punjab	0–9	(Iran) Persepolis	Tehran, Iran
1990–91	First Round	(Pakistan) Punjab	2–4	(Iran) Persepolis	Pakistan
1991–92	First Round	(Pakistan) Karachi Port Trust	0–6	(Indonesia) Pupuk Kaltim	Bontang, Indonesia
1991–92	First Round	(Pakistan) Karachi Port Trust	0–3	(Indonesia) Pupuk Kaltim	Pakistan
1992–93	First Round	Pakistan Airlines	w/o^{1}	(Sri Lanka) York Sporting Club	
1992–93	First Round	Pakistan Airlines	w/o^{1}	(Sri Lanka) York Sporting Club	
1993–94	First Round	(Pakistan) Youth League FC	0–3	(Maldives) New Radiant	Malé, Maldives
1993–94	First Round	(Pakistan) Youth League FC	0–2	(Maldives) New Radiant	Pakistan
1994–95	None Entered				
1995	None Entered				
1996–97	None Entered				
1997–98	None Entered				
1998–99	First Round	Pakistan Airlines	w/o^{2}	(Hong Kong) Happy Valley	
1998–99	First Round	Pakistan Airlines	w/o^{2}	(Hong Kong) Happy Valley	
1999–2000	None Entered				
2000–01	First Round	(Pakistan) Khan Research Laboratories	1–1	(Thailand) BEC Tero Sasana	Bangkok, Thailand
2000–01	First Round	(Pakistan) Khan Research Laboratories	0–6	(Thailand) BEC Tero Sasana	Karachi, Pakistan
2001–02	None Entered				

^{1} Pakistan Airlines and York Sporting Club both withdrew.

^{2} Pakistan Airlines withdrew.

== AFC Cup/AFC Champions League Two ==
AFC Cup
Season	Round	Team	Result	Opponent	Venue
2015	None Entered				
2016	Qualifying round	(Pakistan) K-Electric	3–3	(Bhutan) Druk United	Thimphu, Bhutan
2016	Qualifying round	(Pakistan) K-Electric	1–0	(Mongolia) Khoromkhon	Thimphu, Bhutan
2016	Qualifying play-off	(Pakistan) K-Electric	0–2	(Bahrain) Al-Hidd	Riffa, Bahrain
2017	No League Held				
2018	No League Held				
2019	Entry denied				
2020	No League Held				
2021	No League Held				
2022	No League Held				
2023–24	No League Held				

== AFC President's Cup/AFC Challenge League ==
AFC President's Cup
Season	Round	Team	Result	Opponent	Venue
2005	Group stage	(Pakistan) WAPDA	0–1	(Sri Lanka) Blue Star SC	Kathmandu, Nepal
2005	Group stage	(Pakistan) WAPDA	1–2	(Cambodia) Hello United	Kathmandu, Nepal
2005	Group stage	(Pakistan) WAPDA	1–0	(Kyrgyzstan) Dordoi-Dynamo	Kathmandu, Nepal
2006	Group stage	Pakistan Army	1–4	(Taiwan) Tatung	Kuching, Malaysia
2006	Group stage	Pakistan Army	0–1	(Bhutan) Transport United	Kuching, Malaysia
2006	Group stage	Pakistan Army	1–1	(Cambodia) Khemara	Kuching, Malaysia
2007	Group stage	Pakistan Army	3–3	(Sri Lanka) Ratnam Sports Club	Lahore, Pakistan
2007	Group stage	Pakistan Army	1–2	(Tajikistan) Regar-TadAZ	Lahore, Pakistan
2007	Group stage	Pakistan Army	2–3	(Bhutan) Transport United	Lahore, Pakistan
2008	Group stage	(Pakistan) WAPDA	1–2	(Tajikistan) Regar-TadAZ	Petaling Jaya, Malaysia
2008	Group stage	(Pakistan) WAPDA	1–1	Nepal Police Club	Petaling Jaya, Malaysia
2008	Group stage	(Pakistan) WAPDA	0–1	(Bangladesh) Dhaka Abahani	Petaling Jaya, Malaysia
2009	Group stage	(Pakistan) WAPDA	0–0	(Tajikistan) Regar-TadAZ	Kathmandu, Nepal
2009	Group stage	(Pakistan) WAPDA	0–0	Nepal Police Club	Kathmandu, Nepal
2009	Group stage	(Pakistan) WAPDA	3–1	Taiwan Power Company	Kathmandu, Nepal
2009	Semi-finals	(Pakistan) WAPDA	3–4	(Tajikistan) Regar-TadAZ	Tursunzoda, Tajikistan
2010	Group stage	(Pakistan) Khan Research Laboratories	2–1	(Cambodia) Naga Corp	Yangon, Myanmar
2010	Group stage	(Pakistan) Khan Research Laboratories	0–1	(Tajikistan) Vakhsh Qurghonteppa	Yangon, Myanmar
2010	Group stage	(Pakistan) Khan Research Laboratories	1–2	(Sri Lanka) Renown	Yangon, Myanmar
2011	Group stage	(Pakistan) WAPDA	2–0	Nepal Police Club	Kathmandu, Nepal
2011	Group stage	(Pakistan) WAPDA	0–3	(Taiwan) Taipower	Kathmandu, Nepal
2011	Group stage	(Pakistan) WAPDA	0–1	(Turkmenistan) Balkan	Kathmandu, Nepal
2012	Group stage	(Pakistan) Khan Research Laboratories	0–0	(Mongolia) Erchim	Lahore, Pakistan
2012	Group stage	(Pakistan) Khan Research Laboratories	0–0	Taiwan Power Company	Lahore, Pakistan
2012	Final group stage	(Pakistan) Khan Research Laboratories	1–3	Taiwan Power Company	Dushanbe, Tajikistan
2012	Final group stage	(Pakistan) Khan Research Laboratories	1–5	(Palestine) Markaz Shabab Al-Am'ari	Dushanbe, Tajikistan
2013	Group stage	(Pakistan) Khan Research Laboratories	1–1	(Kyrgyzstan) Dordoi Bishkek	Cebu City, Philippines
2013	Group stage	(Pakistan) Khan Research Laboratories	2–0	(Philippines) Global	Cebu City, Philippines
2013	Group stage	(Pakistan) Khan Research Laboratories	8–0	(Bhutan) Yeedzin	Cebu City, Philippines
2013	Final Group stage	(Pakistan) Khan Research Laboratories	1–0	(Kyrgyzstan) Dordoi Bishkek	Malacca, Malaysia
2013	Final Group stage	(Pakistan) Khan Research Laboratories	2–0	(Palestine) Hilal Al-Quds	Malacca, Malaysia
2013	Final	(Pakistan) Khan Research Laboratories	0–1	(Turkmenistan) Balkan	Malacca, Malaysia
2014	Group stage	(Pakistan) Khan Research Laboratories	0–0	(Bangladesh) Sheikh Russel	Colombo, Sri Lanka
2014	Group stage	(Pakistan) Khan Research Laboratories	3–0	(Bhutan) Ugyen Academy	Colombo, Sri Lanka
2014	Group stage	(Pakistan) Khan Research Laboratories	0–3	Sri Lanka Air Force	Colombo, Sri Lanka
AFC Challenge League
2024–25	No League Held				
2025–26	No League Held				

== Top scorers ==
As of 16 May 2018

Pos	Player	Team	ACC/ACL	AC/ACL2	APC/ACL3	ACWC	Total	Ref.
1	(Pakistan) Kaleemullah Khan	Khan Research Laboratories	—	—	8	—	8	
2	(Pakistan) Arif Mehmood	WAPDA	—	—	6	—	6	
3	(Pakistan) Shabbir Muhammad	Pakistan Army	—	—	3	—	3	
3	(Pakistan) Umar Daraz	Pakistan Army	—	—	3	—	3	
3	(Pakistan) Muhammad Adil	Khan Research Laboratories	—	—	3	—	3	
6	(Pakistan) Saadullah Khan	Khan Research Laboratories	—	—	2	—	2	
6	(Pakistan) Muhammad Rasool	K-Electric	—	2	—	—	2	
8	(Pakistan) Abdul Shakoor	Pakistan Air Force	2	—	—	—	—	

== See also ==
- Pakistan International Airlines FC in international football
