= 1992–93 National A-Division Football Championship =

National A-Division Football Championship
- Season: 1992–93
- Dates: 20 October 1992 – 14 February 1993
- Champions: Pakistan Airlines
- Relegated: Karachi Port Trust; Sindh Government Press

The 1992–93 National A-Division Football Championship, known as 1992–93 National Lifebuoy A-Division Football Championship due to sponsorship reasons, was the 40th edition of the National Football Championship, Pakistan's premier domestic football competition. It was played from 20 October 1992 to 14 February 1993 across several venues in Rawalpindi, Karachi and Lahore. This was the first time a national level league format was held in Pakistan, since the previous knockout format since 1948.

== Overview ==
Under the General Secretary of the Pakistan Football Federation Hafiz Salman Butt, the National Football Championship was structured on a proper league-style basis and spread over a number of months. The top division, named as National Lifebuoy A-Division Football Championship, operated alongside a system of promotion and relegation with the second-tier National Lifebuoy B-Division Football Championship. Butt managed to get a three-year sponsorship deal with Lifebuoy Soap, with amounts of 35 million PKR spent in the organisations of the seasons and televised through the country.

9 teams participated and 72 matches were played, all the teams played against each other twice. Pakistan Airlines won the league title, and Karachi Port Trust and Sindh Government Press were relegated to the National B-Division Football Championship. PIA were entitled to enter the 1993–94 Asian Club Championship, but they withdrew and Defence Club entered instead.

== Final standings ==
Pos	Team	Pld	W	D	L	GF	GA	GD	Pts	Qualification or relegation
1	Pakistan Airlines (C)	16	10	3	3	21	14	+7	23	
2	Pakistan Army	16	8	6	2	24	10	+14	22	
3	WAPDA	16	8	3	5	36	21	+15	19	
4	Habib Bank	16	6	7	3	17	11	+6	19	
5	Pakistan Air Force	16	8	2	6	28	33	−5	18	
6	Wohaib	16	5	4	7	16	18	−2	14	
7	Pakistan Railways	16	4	6	6	15	17	−2	14	
8	Karachi Port Trust (R)	16	4	2	10	20	27	−7	10	Relegation to National B-Division Football Championship
9	Sindh Government Press (R)	16	1	3	12	10	36	−26	5	Relegation to National B-Division Football Championship

Source: RSSSF
(C) Champions; (R) Relegated
