= Zafar Iqbal (footballer) =

Pakistani footballer (born 1965)

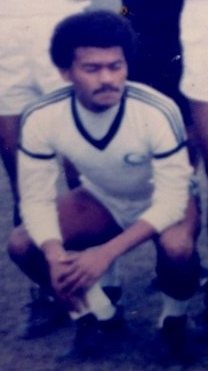
- Iqbal with Pakistan at the 1986 Fajr International Tournament

Personal information
- Full name: Zafar Iqbal Baloch
- Date of birth: 3 February 1965 (age 61)
- Place of birth: Karachi, Pakistan
- Position: Defender

Youth career
- Mauripur Baloch

Senior career*
Years	Team	Apps	(Gls)
1983–1984	PWD		
1984	KMC		
1984	Sindh Government Press		
1985–1995	Pakistan Airlines		
1992	→ Wohaib (loan)		

International career
1985–1995	Pakistan	45	(1)

Managerial career
- 2015–2021: Pakistan Airlines
- * Club domestic league appearances and goals

Zafar Iqbal Baloch (born 3 February 1965) is a Pakistani former footballer who played as a defender. He played for Pakistan Airlines throughout his career, managing the team in the 2010s. Iqbal captained the Pakistan national team in the 1992 Jordan International Tournament and the 1993 SAARC Gold Cup. He also won gold twice with Pakistan at the 1989 and 1991 South Asian Games.

== Club career ==
Iqbal started his career with his local club Mauripur Baloch, and was later picked by National Football Championship departmental side Pakistan Public Works Department (PWD) in 1983. A year later, Iqbal represented KMC and Sindh Government Press.

He later moved to Pakistan Airlines in 1985 where he played for the side till 1995 and winning the National Football Championship twice. He was also borrowed by Wohaib FC to take part in the qualifying round of the 1992–93 Asian Club Championship, where the team earned victories over Club Valencia from Maldives and Brothers Union from Bangladesh to qualify for Group B, becoming the first Pakistani club to pass the qualifying round of an Asian competition. However after the qualification, Iqbal returned to PIA after the start of the 1992–1993 National Football Championship, held from 20 October 1992 to 14 February 1993.

== International career ==
Iqbal made his international debut in the second 1985 South Asian Games held in Bangladesh. During his consequent decade long international career where he featured as a regular starter and earned around 45 caps, he only was omitted from the squad during the 1987 South Asian Games in India, and the 1993 South Asian Games in Bangladesh.

He also featured at the 1986 Fajr International Tournament in Tehran. He started against Poland under-21 team losing by 0–3, and played against Iran where he got a red card at the 43rd minute in the eventual 0–1 defeat. He played at the 1986 Pakistan President's Gold Cup tournament in the same year, and also represented the side at the 1986 Asian Games in Seoul.

In 1989, he was regular starter at the 1990 FIFA World Cup qualification in the country's first participation in the tournament, featuring in all the four games. He also featured in the 1990 Asian Games. He also won gold twice with Pakistan at the 1989 and 1991 South Asian Games. He captained the national team at the 1992 Jordan International Tournament and the 1993 SAARC Gold Cup. He also featured in Pakistan's second participation at the 1994 FIFA World Cup qualification in 1993, playing in all eight matches where Pakistan again ended up unsuccessful.

== Coaching career ==
In 2005, Iqbal served as assistant coach of the Pakistan national under-17 team during the 2006 AFC U-17 Championship qualification.

After his retirement as player, Iqbal served as manager and coach of the Pakistan Airlines football team. He replaced former PIA coach Shamim Khan in 2015. Financial difficulties at the airline subsequently affected its departmental sports operations. In 2021, Iqbal was among the several players leaving the airline and retired from the department via golden handshake.

== Career statistics ==
=== International goals ===
Scores and results list Pakistan's goal tally first, score column indicates score after each Iqbal goal.

List of international goals scored by Zafar Iqbal
No.	Date	Venue	Opponent	Score	Result	Competition	Ref.
1	25 March 1995	Sugathadasa Stadium, Colombo, Sri Lanka	Bangladesh	1–0	1–0	1995 SAARC Gold Cup	

== Honours ==
=== Pakistan ===
- South Asian Games
  - Winners (2): 1989, 1991

== See also ==
- List of Pakistan national football team captains
