= Ravi FC =

Pakistani football club

- Full name: Ravi Football Club
- League: PFF League
- 2010 PFF League: Group stage

Ravi Football Club is a Pakistani football club based in Islamabad. It last competed in the PFF League.

== History ==
in 2003, the club played a friendly against Akbar FC, losing by 2–0. From 2004, the club participated in the Islamabad Football Association league. In the 2005 edition, the club recorded a win in the final by 2–1 against Mehran FC.

The club made its professional debut in the 2009–10 PFF League. It finished first in the group C of the club leg, after winning by 2–0 against Hazara Zamindar, and 1–0 against Karachi Kickers. In the next stage, the club didn't qualify in a group comprising Muslim FC and Young Blood. In the next 2010 PFF League, the club clinched the region phase, after Gilgit FC failed to turn up for their match against Azad Kashmir club Star FC. In the group B of the consequent round, the club finished last behind Afghan Sports and Pakpattan club Al Hilal, failing to advance to the next round.

== Competitive record ==
The club's competitive records since the 2009–10 season are listed below.

Season	Div	Tms	Pos	National Challenge Cup	AFC President's Cup	AFC Cup
2009–10	Football Federation League	18	Final group stage	DNP	DNP	DNP
2010–11	Football Federation League	16	Group stage	DNP	DNP	DNP
