= 2005 National Challenge Cup =

Tournament details
- Country: Pakistan
- Dates: 17 June – 5 August 2005
- Teams: 31

Final positions
- Champions: PTCL (2nd title)
- Runners-up: WAPDA
- All statistics correct as of 5 August 2005.

The 2005 National Challenge Cup was the 17th season of National Challenge Cup, the main cup tournament in Pakistani football.

PTCL won the cup, although their team was dissolved in the end of 2005 season.

== Background ==
The Pakistan Football Federation under new elected body headed by president Faisal Saleh Hayat abolished the President's PFF Cup along with the National Football Championship in 2004, as part of a league-first restructuring. In 2005 the federation launched the National Challenge Cup, often promoted in contemporary reports as an inaugural tournament, although it effectively represented a rebranded continuation of the earlier President’s PFF Cup. In contrary to the departments-only format of the former President PFF Cup, the restructured Challenge Cup briefly admitted club sides in the preliminary stage before the seeded departments entered later rounds.

Ahead of the event, the federation announced a format with five pre-seeded teams, WAPDA, KRL, Army, KPT and NBP, entering directly at the second stage. The tournament was scheduled to kick off on 1 June, featuring 27 phase-one teams, a prize purse of Rs1 million, and matches staged in Peshawar, Wah, Lahore, Faisalabad, Karachi and Quetta.

During the competition the second-stage venues were shifted, with Group I matches moved to Faisalabad and Group II to Rawalpindi’s Army Stadium.

PTCL won the cup in August 2005, with striker Adeel Ahmed finishing as leading scorer. The final at Rawalpindi Army Sports Complex was held under floodlights, with PFF president Faisal Saleh Hayat as chief guest.

== Stage 1 ==
Note: WAPDA, Khan Research Laboratories, Pakistan Army, Karachi Port Trust and National Bank of Pakistan bye to stage 2.

=== Pool A ===
Pos	Team	Pld	W	D	L	GF	GA	GD	Pts
1	Higher Education Commission	3	2	1	0	12	4	+8	7
2	United Club	3	2	0	1	6	7	−1	6
3	PA XI Club	3	1	1	1	6	6	0	4
4	Mardan FC	3	0	0	3	4	11	−7	0
-	Young Eleven FC	0	-	-	-	-	-	—	0

Source: RSSSF

=== Playoff ===
June 25, 2005

Higher Education Commission	3–1	Pakistan Air Force
	Report

July 11, 2005

Pakistan Air Force	1–2	Higher Education Commission
	Report

=== Pool B ===
Pos	Team	Pld	W	D	L	GF	GA	GD	Pts
1	Pakistan Ordnance Factory	3	3	0	0	7	1	+6	9
2	Mehran FC	3	2	0	1	10	7	+3	6
3	DFA XI Gilgit	3	1	0	2	5	7	−2	3
4	Pilot FC	3	0	0	3	3	10	−7	0

Source: RSSSF

=== Playoff ===
June 11, 2005

Pakistan Ordnance Factory	1–2	PTCL
	Report

June 13, 2005

PTCL	1–0	Pakistan Ordnance Factory
	Report

=== Pool C ===
Pos	Team	Pld	W	D	L	GF	GA	GD	Pts
1	Panther Club	6	4	1	1	15	5	+10	13
2	Pakistan Railways FC	6	4	0	2	17	5	+12	12
3	Wohaib FC	6	3	1	2	27	8	+19	10
4	City FC	6	0	0	6	3	44	−41	0

Source: RSSSF

=== Pool D ===
==== Group 1 ====
Pos	Team	Pld	W	D	L	GF	GA	GD	Pts
1	Pakistan Public Works Department	4	3	0	1	7	5	+2	9
2	Pakistan Navy	4	3	0	1	5	3	+2	9
3	Sui Southern Gas	4	2	1	1	8	2	+6	7
4	City District Government Karachi	4	1	1	2	5	6	−1	4
5	Mauripur Baloch	4	0	0	4	2	11	−9	0

Source: RSSSF

==== Group 2 ====
Pos	Team	Pld	W	D	L	GF	GA	GD	Pts
1	Karachi Electric Supply Corporation	4	3	1	0	11	2	+9	10
2	Sindh Government Press	4	3	0	1	10	2	+8	9
3	Habib Bank Limited	4	2	1	1	9	3	+6	7
4	Korangi Rangers Club	4	1	0	3	5	8	−3	3
5	Naka Muhammadan	4	0	0	4	3	23	−20	0

Source: RSSSF

=== Semifinals ===
June 24, 2005

Pakistan Public Works Department	1–2	Sindh Government Press
	Report

June 25, 2005

Karachi Electric Supply Corporation	1–1	Pakistan Navy
	Report

==== Replay ====
June 27, 2005

Karachi Electric Supply Corporation	0–1	Pakistan Navy
	Report

=== Third place match ===
June 29, 2005

Karachi Electric Supply Corporation	1–1	Pakistan Public Works Department
	Report

=== Final ===
June 29, 2005

Pakistan Navy	1–1 (a.e.t.)	Sindh Government Press
	Report
Penalties
	4–3

=== Pool E ===
Pos	Team	Pld	W	D	L	GF	GA	GD	Pts
1	Pakistan Police	4	2	2	0	0	0	0	8
2	Afghan Chaman	4	2	1	1	0	0	0	7
3	Baloch Quetta	3	1	2	0	0	0	0	5
4	Balochistan Club	4	0	0	4	0	0	0	0

Source: RSSSF

== Stage 2 ==
=== Group 1 ===
Pos	Team	Pld	W	D	L	GF	GA	GD	Pts
1	Khan Research Laboratories	5	5	0	0	11	4	+7	15
2	WAPDA	5	4	0	1	14	3	+11	12
3	Karachi Electric Supply Corporation	5	3	0	2	7	5	+2	9
4	Pakistan Navy	5	2	0	3	3	7	−4	6
5	Pakistan Police	5	1	0	4	3	12	−9	3
6	Panther Club	5	0	0	5	5	12	−7	0

Source: RSSSF

=== Group 2 ===
Pos	Team	Pld	W	D	L	GF	GA	GD	Pts
1	Pakistan Army	5	5	0	0	8	0	+8	15
2	PTCL	5	4	0	1	16	6	+10	12
3	National Bank	5	2	1	2	18	5	+13	7
4	Karachi Port Trust	5	2	1	2	11	7	+4	7
5	Sindh Government Press	5	1	0	4	9	16	−7	3
6	Higher Education Commission	5	0	0	5	2	30	−28	0

Source: RSSSF

== Knockout round ==
=== Semifinals ===
August 1, 2005

Pakistan Army	0–1	WAPDA
	Report

August 2, 2005

Khan Research Laboratories	1–3	PTCL
	Report

=== Third place match ===
August 4, 2005

Pakistan Army	N/A	Khan Research Laboratories
	Report

=== Final ===
August 5, 2005

WAPDA	1–2	PTCL
	Report

Army Stadium, Rawalpindi
