= 2009–10 PFF League =

PFF League
- Season: 2009–10
- Dates: 9 November 2009 – 6 January 2010
- Champions: Sui Southern Gas (1st title)
- Promoted: Sui Southern Gas; Young Blood

The 2009–10 PFF League was the 6th season of the second-tier of Pakistan Football Federation. The season commenced on 19 November 2009 and concluded on 6 January 2010.

On 14 December 2009, Sui Southern Gas won the departmental leg after defeating Pakistan Television 1–0 and on 17 December 2009, Young Blood defeated Baloch Quetta 3–1 in the club phase finals.

Sui Southern Gas won the league by defeating club phase winners Young Blood 1–0 in the finals.

== Departmental leg ==
=== Group A ===
Pos	Team	Pld	W	D	L	GF	GA	GD	Pts	Qualification
1	Sindh Government Press	3	2	1	0	4	2	+2	7	Advance to Semi-finals
2	Sui Southern Gas	3	2	1	0	4	2	+2	7	Advance to Semi-finals
3	Pakistan Steel	3	0	1	2	3	5	−2	1 (Note: Pakistan Steel finished ahead of Pakistan Public Work Department on head-to-head points: Pakistan Steel 1–0 Pakistan Public Work Department.)	
4	Pakistan Public Works Department	3	0	1	2	1	3	−2	1	

Updated to match(es) played on 26 November 2009. Source: RSSSF
Notes:
19 November 2009

Sui Southern Gas	2–1	Pakistan Steel
	Report

20 November 2009

Sindh Government Press	1–0	Pakistan Public Works Department
	Report

22 November 2009

Sui Southern Gas	0–0	Sindh Government Press
	Report

23 November 2004

Pakistan Steel	1–0	Pakistan Public Works Department
	Report

25 November 2009

Sui Southern Gas	2–1	Pakistan Public Works Department
	Report

26 November 2009

Sindh Government Press	3–2	Pakistan Steel
	Report

=== Group B ===
Pos	Team	Pld	W	D	L	GF	GA	GD	Pts	Qualification
1	Pakistan Television	2	1	0	1	2	4	−2	3	Advance to Semi-finals
2	Higher Education Commission	2	0	0	2	2	4	−2	0	Advance to Semi-finals
3	Pakistan Police	2	2	0	0	5	1	+4	6	

Updated to match(es) played on 22 November 2009. Source: RSSSF
18 November 2009

Higher Education Commission	2–0	Pakistan Police
	Report

20 November 2009

Pakistan Television	1–0	Higher Education Commission
	Report

22 November 2009

Pakistan Television	1–0	Pakistan Police
	Report

26 November 2009

Sindh Government Press	3–2	Pakistan Steel
	Report

== Club leg ==
Muslim, Mehran and Wohaib directly qualified for the second stage of club phase.

=== First stage ===
==== Group A ====
Pos	Team	Pld	W	D	L	GF	GA	GD	Pts	Qualification
1	Baloch Quetta	2	1	0	1	2	4	−2	3	Advance to Semi-finals
2	Munir Shaheed	2	0	0	2	2	4	−2	0	Advance to Semi-finals
3	Qureshi	2	2	0	0	5	1	+4	6	

Updated to match(es) played on 22 November 2009. Source: RSSSF
18 November 2009

Baloch Quetta	2–1	Munir Shaheed
	Report

20 November 2009

Munir Shaheed	2–1	Qureshi
	Report

22 November 2009

Baloch Quetta	6–1	Qureshi
	Report

==== Group B ====
Pos	Team	Pld	W	D	L	GF	GA	GD	Pts
1	Young Blood	3	3	0	0	5	1	+4	6
2	Afghan Quetta	3	2	0	1	6	2	+4	4
3	Dera Eleven	3	1	0	2	8	4	+4	2
4	City	3	0	0	3	0	12	-12	0

18 November 2009

Young Blood	1–0	Afghan Quetta
	Report

19 November 2009

Dera Eleven	6–0	City
	Report

21 November 2009

Dera Eleven	1–2	Afghan Quetta
	Report

22 November 2009

Young Blood	2–0	City
	Report

24 November 2009

Young Blood	2–1	Dera Eleven
	Report

25 November 2009

Afghan Quetta	4–0	City
	Report

==== Group C ====
Pos	Team	Pld	W	D	L	GF	GA	GD	Pts
1	Ravi	2	2	0	0	3	0	+3	4
2	Karachi Kickers	2	1	0	1	3	1	+2	2
3	Hazara Zamindar	2	0	0	2	0	5	-5	0

20 November 2009

Ravi	2–0	Hazara Zamindar
	Report

22 November 2009

Karachi Kickers	3–0	Hazara Zamindar
	Report

24 November 2009

Ravi	1–0	Karachi Kickers
	Report

=== Second stage ===
==== Group A ====
Pos	Team	Pld	W	D	L	GF	GA	GD	Pts
1	Muslim FC	–	–	–	–	–	–	–	–
2	Young Blood	–	–	–	–	–	–	–	–
3	Ravi	–	–	–	–	–	–	–	–

==== Group B ====
Pos	Team	Pld	W	D	L	GF	GA	GD	Pts
1	Baloch Quetta	–	–	–	–	–	–	–	–
2	Wohaib	–	–	–	–	–	–	–	–
3	Mehran	–	–	–	–	–	–	–	–

=== Departmental leg ===
7 December 2009

Sui Southern Gas	4–0	Higher Education Commission
	Report

Karachi
8 December 2009

Pakistan Television	2–0	Sindh Government Press
	Report

Rawalpindi

=== Club leg ===
15 December 2009

Baloch Quetta	3–1	Muslim
	Report

Islamabad
17 December 2009

Young Blood	1–0	Wohaib
	Report

Islamabad

=== Departmental leg ===
14 December 2009

Sui Southern Gas	1–0	Pakistan Television
	Report

Quaid-i-Azam Sports Complex, Karachi
17 December 2009

Young Blood	3–1	Baloch Quetta
	Report

Punjab University Ground, Lahore

== Grand-final ==
6 January 2010

Young Blood	0–1	Sui Southern Gas Company
	Report

Ali Rai Nawaz Stadium, Sahiwal
