= Shamim Khan =

Pakistani former footballer and manager (born 1955)

Personal information
- Full name: Muhammad Shamim Khan
- Date of birth: 11 December 1955 (age 70)
- Place of birth: Hyderabad, Pakistan
- Position: Midfielder

Youth career
- Red Rose Club

Senior career*
Years	Team	Apps	(Gls)
1977–1992	Pakistan Airlines		

International career
1976–1982	Pakistan		

Managerial career
- ??–2015: Pakistan Airlines
- 2005: Pakistan U17
- * Club domestic league appearances and goals

Muhammad Shamim Khan (born 15 December 1955) is a Pakistani former footballer who played as a midfielder, and former manager. Khan is among the major players of the Pakistan national football team in the 1980s.

== Early life ==
Khan was born on 15 December 1955 in Hyderabad, in the Sindh province of Pakistan.

== Club career ==
Khan started his football career at Red Rose Club of Hyderabad. In 1977, he was selected for National Football Championship departmental side Pakistan Airlines. Khan was selected as captain for the Sattar Club in 1977, when the team toured Afghanistan and played four matches there. Besides winning the domestic title four times, he also toured with the team to the United Arab Emirates, Kuwait and Niger. He also participated with the team at the Aga Khan Gold Cup in Dhaka in 1978 and 1980.

== International career ==
Khan was selected for the Pakistan national team at the 1976 Quaid-e-Azam International Tournament held in Karachi. In 1981, he toured Burma and played at the 1981 King's Cup in Thailand. Khan also played at the next 1982 Quaid-e-Azam International Tournament edition, where he featured in all matches as regular starter.

== Coaching career ==
After de facto retirement from the Pakistan Airlines football team in 1992, he became involved in the field of coaching through guidance of Tariq Lutfi. The same year, he participated in coaching course in Lahore, and later in Karachi in 1995, until receiving his coaching certificate.

After initially serving as assistant coach of PIA under Tariq Lutfi, he eventually assumed the head coach position.

In 2005, he served as head coach of the Pakistan national under-17 football team for the 2006 AFC U-17 Championship qualification. He also worked for the Pakistan street child team for the 2014 edition of the Street Child World Cup held in Brazil. Under a course under AFC in 2005, he obtained his C license, until acquiring the B license with the first position when AFC organized a coaching course in Lahore in 2010, becoming the first ever B licensed coach from Sindh.

Nearing his retirement, he served PIA as head coach till 2015. He was replaced by former international Zafar Iqbal. After years of football inactivity due to internal crisis within the Pakistan Football Federation, Khan briefly served as manager of SSGC during the 2018–19 Pakistan Premier League.

== Honours ==
=== Pakistan Airlines ===
- National Football Championship: 1978, 1981, 1989, 1992–93
- Inter-Provincial Championship: 1984
