= Ahmed Jan (referee) =

Pakistani football referee (1952–2025)

- Born: 23 March 1952; Karachi, Sind Province, Pakistan
- Died: 23 July 2025 (aged 73); Karachi, Sindh, Pakistan

Domestic
Years	League	Role
1984–1992	National Football Championship	Referee

International
Years	League	Role
1994–??	FIFA listed	Referee

Ahmed Jan (Urdu: احمد جان; 23 March 1952 – 23 July 2025) was a Pakistani footballer who played as goalkeeper, and FIFA referee.

== Early life ==
Jan was born on 23 March 1952 in Karachi, Pakistan. He was the oldest among eight siblings, seven brothers and one sister. His father, Nadir Khan, hailed from Swat in the North-West Frontier Province. Jan completed his matriculation at City Boys Secondary School in Karachi.

== Playing career ==
Jan began his football journey in 1968 as a goalkeeper for Makran Sports Old Golimar. Over the years, he went on to represent clubs such as Young Kalakot, Sindh Police, and the Pakistan Public Works Department (PPWD), before joining Karachi Municipal Corporation (KMC) in 1971, where he spent the majority of his playing career. In 1971, he was selected to play for the Sindh provincial team during the National Football Championship held in Multan. However, in 1972, he withdrew from further trials due to internal team politics and favouritism.

== Refereeing career ==
Inspired by the officiating of renowned local referees such as Nabi Bakhsh, Bahadur Khan, Jan Muhammad, and Captain Amin, Jan developed a keen interest in refereeing. With their encouragement, he pursued this path and was granted a national referee card in 1984. Jan was also encouraged to pursue refereeing by fellow KMC and Pakistan international captain Muhammad Umer. Jan officiated matches across the country until 1992.

In 1994, Jan was included in the FIFA International Referees List after successfully passing a fitness test during a refresher course in Delhi. He went on to officiate 13 international matches in countries including China, Cambodia, Singapore, the Maldives, and India.

== Personal life ==
Jan was a well-known yet polarising figure within Pakistan’s football community. Recognised for his outspoken behaviour and frequent challenges to authority, he had multiple disputes with the Pakistan Football Federation.

He was appointed caretaker of the KMC Football Stadium in 1989 and continued in that role even after his official retirement from the KMC department in 2011. On 26 August 1999, Jan survived an assassination attempt when two gunmen, in an attempt to take control of the KMC ground, fired several shots at him.

In addition to his administrative duties, Jan also coached various football teams in Lyari, including women’s teams.

On 15 October 2008, the PFF suspended Jan for allegedly violating its Code of Conduct and Discipline after he publicly criticised the federation on television. Jan, however, maintained that he held no formal position within either the PFF or the Sindh Football Association, and continued officiating matches without interruption, including the Karachi Football League final between Shahzad Mohammadan and Nazimabad on 14 February 2009. On 28 May 2009, the PFF again imposed a two-year ban and a 50,000-rupee fine on Jan, for allegedly insulting and criticising PFF officials in front of a crowd and media.

Jan's wife died on 23 August 2013 in Karachi.

On 16 August 2024, Jan, along with around 100 officials, was issued notices by the Pakistan Football Federation due to their alleged role in creating a parallel association and orchestrating a hostile takeover of the PFF offices.

=== Death ===
Jan died after a prolonged illness in Karachi, on 23 July 2025, at the age of 73. His funeral prayers were held at the KMC Football Stadium.
