= 2004–05 PFF League =

PFF League
- Season: 1st
- Dates: 22 November 2004 – 1 February 2005
- Champions: National Bank of Pakistan; Pakistan Public Works Department
- Promoted: National Bank of Pakistan; Pakistan Public Works Department

The 2004–05 PFF League was the 1st season of second tier of Pakistan Football Federation. The season was scheduled to start on 22 November 2004 and concluded on 1 February 2005. The league's name was originally planned as 'National League Division B', however it was ultimately branded as PFF League since its formation.

== Groups ==
=== Northern ===
Pos	Team	Pld	W	D	L	GF	GA	GD	Pts
1	Pakistan Air Force	8	6	2	0	15	3	+12	12
2	Pakistan Railways	8	5	2	1	16	7	+9	10
3	Pakistan Ordnance Factories	8	4	2	2	10	4	+6	8
4	Pakistan Police	8	1	1	6	5	12	-7	2
5	Higher Education Commission	8	0	1	7	3	23	-20	0
6	Northern Areas (W)								
7	Azad Kashmir (W)								

22 November 2004

Pakistan Ordnance Factories	1–0	Pakistan Police
Ihsan (75')	Report

26 November 2004

Pakistan Police	3–1	Higher Education Commission
	Report

22 November 2004

Pakistan Air Force	1–1	Pakistan Railways
Ihsan (75')	Report

=== Southern ===
Pos	Team	Pld	W	D	L	GF	GA	GD	Pts
1	Pakistan Public Works Department	10	7	2	1	15	5	+10	14
2	National Bank of Pakistan	10	6	4	0	19	2	+17	12
3	K-Electric	9	5	2	2	12	6	+6	10
4	Sindh Government Press	9	2	1	6	7	13	-6	4
5	Sui Southern Gas Company	9	1	2	6	6	17	-11	2
6	City District Government Karachi	9	1	1	7	2	18	-16	2
7	Pakistan International Airlines (W)								

25 November 2004

City District Government Karachi	0–2	Sindh Government Press
	Report

KMC Stadium, Karachi
25 November 2004

National Bank of Pakistan	2–2	Pakistan Public Works Department
	Report

KMC Stadium, Karachi
26 November 2004

K-Electric	3–0	Sui Southern Gas Company
Own Goal (44'); Abdul Ghafoor (48'); Musa (87')	Report

KMC Stadium, Karachi
27 November 2004

City District Government Karachi	3–0	Sindh Government Press
	Report

KMC Stadium, Karachi
27 November 2004

National Bank of Pakistan	0–2	Pakistan Public Works Department
	Report

KMC Stadium, Karachi
28 November 2004

K-Electric	1–0	Sui Southern Gas Company
	Report

KMC Stadium, Karachi
30 November 2004

Sui Southern Gas Company	0–1	K-Electric
Abdul Ghafoor (11')	Report

KMC Stadium, Karachi
30 November 2004

City District Government Karachi	0–1	Pakistan Public Works Department
Gul Muhammad (33')	Report

KMC Stadium, Karachi
1 December 2004

National Bank of Pakistan	4–0	Sui Southern Gas Company
Ismail (14'); Tariq (18'); Jameel Ahmed (31'); Abdul Aziz (74')	Report

KMC Stadium, Karachi
1 December 2004

Sindh Government Press	1–3	K-Electric
Karim Bux (37')	Report	Muhammad Musa (5, 31); Akbar Ali (54') (penalty)

KMC Stadium, Karachi
2 December 2004

Sindh Government Press	2–0 Awarded to SGP	City District Government Karachi
	Report

KMC Stadium, Karachi
3 December 2004

City District Government Karachi	0–2	Pakistan Ordnance Factories
	Report

KMC Stadium, Karachi
5 December 2004

National Bank of Pakistan	5–0	Sindh Government Press
	Report

KMC Stadium, Karachi
6 December 2004

Sui Southern Gas Company	4–0	City District Government Karachi
Zahid Junior (12', 89'); Jameel (36); Aftab (75')	Report

KMC Stadium, Karachi
7 December 2004

National Bank of Pakistan	2–0	Sindh Government Press
Farooq Shah (74'); Abdul Aziz (86')	Report

KMC Stadium, Karachi
8 December 2004

City District Government Karachi	1–0	Sui Southern Gas Company
Abdul Karim (7')	Report

KMC Stadium, Karachi
10 December 2004

National Bank of Pakistan	3–0	City District Government Karachi
Abdul Aziz (11', 83'); Farooq Shah (43')	Report

KMC Stadium, Karachi
10 December 2004

Pakistan Public Works Department	1–0	Sindh Government Press
Tariq Umer (65')	Report

KMC Stadium, Karachi
12 December 2004

K-Electric	3–1	City District Government Karachi
Aurangzeb (42', 56', 89')	Report	Ayub (41')

KMC Stadium, Karachi
12 December 2004

Sui Southern Gas Company	1–1	Sindh Government Press
Muhammad Musa	Report	Lal Muhammad

KMC Stadium, Karachi
14 December 2004

Pakistan Public Works Department	4–0	Sui Southern Gas Company
Muhammad Jan (52'); Tariq Umer (61', 67', 70')	Report

KMC Stadium, Karachi
14 December 2004

City District Government Karachi	4–0	National Bank of Pakistan
	Report

KMC Stadium, Karachi
20 December 2004

Pakistan Public Works Department	3–1	Sui Southern Gas Company
Muhammad Ali; Ramzan	Report	Shakir

KMC Stadium, Karachi
20 December 2004

National Bank of Pakistan	2–0	K-Electric
Jamil; Abdul Sattar Mansuri	Report

KMC Stadium, Karachi

=== Final Round ===
Pos	Team	Pld	W	D	L	GF	GA	GD	Pts	Qualification
1	National Bank of Pakistan	6	3	2	1	7	3	5	8	Promote to 2005-06 Pakistan Premier League
2	Pakistan Railways	6	2	2	2	4	3	-1	6	Promote to 2005-06 Pakistan Premier League
3	Pakistan Public Works Department	6	1	3	2	7	-4	5	5	Stay in Football Federation League
4	Pakistan Air Force	6	1	3	2	1	-1	5	5	Stay in Football Federation League

11 January 2005

National Bank of Pakistan	3–0	Pakistan Public Works Department
Muhammad Ashraf (10'); Abdul Aziz (31'); Muhammad Jamil (44')	Report

KMC Stadium, Karachi
13 January 2005

Pakistan Public Works Department	1–2	National Bank of Pakistan
Farooq Shah (56')	Report	Jan Muhammad (44'); Mobin (70')

KMC Stadium, Karachi
15 January 2005

National Bank of Pakistan	2–0	Pakistan Railways
	Report

KMC Stadium, Karachi
16 January 2005

Pakistan Air Force	0–0	Pakistan Public Works Department
	Report

KMC Stadium, Karachi
31 January 2005

Pakistan Railways	3–1	Pakistan Public Works Department
Kaleemullah (12'); Afzal Ali (29'); Muhammad Asif (36')	Report	Muhammad Shakir (59')

KMC Stadium, Karachi
1 February 2005

National Bank of Pakistan	2–0	Pakistan Air Force
Muhammad Ashraf (73')	Report

KMC Stadium, Karachi
