= Nawaz Rehman =

Pakistani footballer

Personal information
- Date of birth: 1968 (age 57–58)
- Place of birth: Karachi, Pakistan
- Position: Midfielder

Youth career
- Mauripur Baloch

Senior career*
Years	Team	Apps	(Gls)
–2009	Karachi Port Trust		

International career
1987–1995	Pakistan		
- * Club domestic league appearances and goals

Nawaz Rehman (Urdu: نواز رحمان; born 1968) is a Pakistani former footballer who played as a midfielder, and manager. He represented the Pakistan national team in the 1990s.

== Early life ==
Rehman was born in the Mauripur locality of Karachi. His father, Abdul Rehman, was a footballer who played as right-back for Karachi Port Trust, which and served as inspiration for Nawaz to play football. Nawaz started his football career with Maripur Baloch.

== Club career ==
During a match between Karachi Port Trust senior and junior teams, junior team midfielder Abdul Samad was unfit due to injury, so the coach of the team Moosa Lashari selected Rehman as a midfielder in his place where he earned acclaim. He subsequently started playing for KPT.

He also played the 1991–92 Asian Cup Winners' Cup after KPT won the National Departmental Championship in 1990.

== International career ==
Rehman started his international career at the 1987 Quaid-e-Azam International Tournament in Lahore, he was selected for the national team. Later, he played in the Olympic qualifiers. He then participated in the 1995 SAARC Gold Cup in Sri Lanka with the national team, where he featured as a regular starter.

== Coaching career ==
After retirement as player, Rehman earned the AFC C license, and opened football academy named Abdul Rahman Football Academy in Mauripur. He also served as coach for KPT.

== Personal life ==
Nawaz younger brother Farooq Rehman also played for the Pakistan national team.
