= 2011 PFF League =

Pakistan football federation league 2011-2012

PFF League
- Season: 2011
- Dates: 22 November – 20 December
- Champions: Zarai Taraqiati
- Promoted: Zarai Taraqiati; Wohaib
- Matches: 42
- Goals: 119 (2.83 per match)
- Top goalscorer: Izhar Ullah (7 goals)
- Best goalkeeper: Waqas(Wohaib); Zaid Arif(Zarai Taraqiati)
- Biggest home win: Young Blood 3–0 Baloch Quetta (18 December 2011); Sui Southern Gas 5–2 Gwadar Port Authority (22 November 2011); Zarai Taraqiati 3–0 Sui Southern Gas (12 December 2011)
- Biggest away win: FATA 0–5 Wohaib (24 November 2011)
- Highest scoring: Sui Southern Gas 5–2 Gwadar Port Authority (22 November 2011); Mansaab 2–5 Wohaib (26 November 2011); Gwadar Port Authority 4–3 Pakistan Public Work Dept (26 November 2011)
- Longest winning run: 4 games Wohaib
- Longest unbeaten run: 5 games Pakistan Television; University
- All statistics correct as of December 20, 2011.

The 2011 PFF League (PFFL) was the 8th season of second tier of Pakistan Football Federation. The season started on 22 November 2011 and concluded on 20 December 2011.

== Teams ==
A total of 17 teams will contest the league. 10 teams played via departmental route and 7 played from club route.

=== Relegation (pre-season) ===
Sui Southern Gas and Young Blood were relegated from 2010–11 Pakistan Premier League season.

Teams relegated from the 2010–11 Pakistan Premier League

- Sui Southern Gas
- Young Blood

=== Teams ===
Club Phase	Departmental Phase
Afghan Sports; Baloch Quetta; FATA; Mansaab; University; Wohaib; Young Blood	Ashraf Sugar Mills; Gwadar Port Authority; Higher Education Commission; Mecca Flour Mills; Pakistan Public Work Department; Pakistan Railways; Pakistan Steel; Pakistan Television; Sui Southern Gas; Zarai Taraiqti

== Club phase ==
=== Group stages ===
==== Group A ====
Pos	Team	Pld	W	D	L	GF	GA	GD	Pts	Qualification
1	University	2	2	0	0	4	1	+3	6	Advance to Final stage
2	Young Blood	2	1	0	1	3	1	+2	3	Advance to Final stage
3	Afghan Sports	2	0	0	2	0	2	−2	0	

Updated to match(es) played on 28 November 2011. Source: Soccerway
23 November 2011
12:00 PST

Afghan Sports	0–1	University
		M. Atif 50' (pen.)

Rai Ali Nawaz Stadium, Sahiwal
24 November 2011
14:15 PST

Young Blood	1–3	University
		M. Rahat 23', 52'; Usman Manzoor 77'

Rai Ali Nawaz Stadium, Sahiwal
28 November 2011
14:15 PST

Young Blood	1–0	Afghan Sports
Naeem Riaz 12'

Rai Ali Nawaz Stadium, Sahiwal

==== Group B ====
Pos	Team	Pld	W	D	L	GF	GA	GD	Pts	Qualification
1	Wohaib	3	2	0	1	10	3	+7	6	Advance to Final stage
2	Baloch Quetta	3	1	2	0	3	2	+1	5	Advance to Final stage
3	FATA	3	1	1	1	5	8	−3	4	
4	Mansaab	3	0	1	2	3	8	−5	1	

Updated to match(es) played on 28 November 2011. Source: Soccerway
24 November 2011
12:00 PST

Mansaab	0–0	Baloch Quetta

Punjab University Stadium, Lahore
24 November 2011
14:15 PST

FATA	0–5	Wohaib
		Naeem Heera 46'; M. Shahzad 66'; Ahmed Faheem 72'; Jabbran bin Salman 82'; Waqar 90'

Punjab University Stadium, Lahore
26 November 2011
12:00 PST

FATA	2–2	Baloch Quetta
Nawab Gul 39'; Bashir Khan 57' (pen.)		Bayberg 37', 58'

Punjab University Stadium, Lahore
26 November 2011
14:15 PST

Mansaab	2–5	Wohaib
Mujeeb-ur-Rehman 35'; Izzatullah 67' (pen.)		M. Shahbaz 3'; Ahmed Faheem 25', 61'; M. Salman 60'; M. Idrees 87'

Punjab University Stadium, Lahore
28 November 2011
12:00 PST

Mansaab	1–3	FATA
Atta-ur-Rehman 33'		Wajid Ali 58', 61', 68'

Punjab University Stadium, Lahore
28 November 2011
14:15 PST

Baloch Quetta	1–0	Wohaib
Zahid Ali 88'

Punjab University Stadium, Lahore

=== Final stage (Club) ===
Pos	Team	Pld	W	D	L	GF	GA	GD	Pts	Qualification
1	Wohaib	3	2	1	0	4	0	+4	7	Promoted to Pakistan Premier League
2	University	3	2	1	0	4	2	+2	7	
3	Young Blood	3	1	0	2	4	5	−1	3	
4	Baloch Quetta	3	0	0	3	1	6	−5	0	

Updated to match(es) played on 28 November 2011. Source: Soccerway
13 December 2011
12:00 PST

University	2–1	Baloch Quetta
Usman Manzoor 29'; M. Burhan 65'		M. Rafiq 49'

Punjab Stadium, Lahore
13 December 2011
14:00 PST

Young Blood	0–3	Wohaib
		Nauman 66', 81'; Ahmed Faheem 73'

Punjab Stadium, Lahore
15 December 2011
12:00 PST

University	2–1	Young Blood
Imran Mumtaz 15'; Usman Manzoor 88'		Awais Raza 71'

Railway Stadium, Lahore
15 December 2011
14:15 PST

Wohaib	1–0	Baloch Quetta
M. Naeem 60'

Railway Stadium, Lahore
18 December 2011
10:15 PST

Young Blood	3–0	Baloch Quetta
	Report

Punjab Stadium, Lahore
18 December 2011
14:15 PST

University	0–0	Wohaib

Punjab Stadium, Lahore

== Departmental phase ==
=== Group stages ===
==== Group A ====
Pos	Team	Pld	W	D	L	GF	GA	GD	Pts	Qualification
1	Sui Southern Gas	4	2	1	1	8	5	+3	7	Advance to Final stage
2	Pakistan Public Work Dept.	4	2	0	2	7	7	0	6	Advance to Final stage
3	Ashraf Sugar Mills	4	2	0	2	5	5	0	6	
4	Pakistan Steel	4	1	2	1	4	4	0	5	
5	Gwadar Port Authority	4	1	1	2	10	13	−3	4	

Updated to match(es) played on 28 November 2011. Source: Soccerway
22 November 2011
12:00 PST

Sui Southern Gas	5–2	Gwadar Port Authority
Shahzad 23', 44'; Asim Fayaz 39'; Sabir Khan 59'; Shah Nawaz 88' (o.g.)		Shah Nawaz 66'; Asim Sarwar 69'

Korangi Baloch Stadium, Karachi
22 November 2011
14:15 PST

Pakistan Steel	1–0	Pakistan Public Work Dept.
A. Wahab 45+1'

Korangi Baloch Stadium, Karachi
24 November 2011
12:00 PST

Gwadar Port Authority	1–2	Ashraf Sugar Mills
Tariq Badal 45'		M. Azeem 20'; Umair Ashraf 40'

Korangi Baloch Stadium, Karachi
24 November 2011
14:15 PST

Sui Southern Gas	1–2	Pakistan Public Work Dept
Imran 70'		Muhammad 5', 23'

Korangi Baloch Stadium, Karachi
26 November 2011
12:00 PST

Pakistan Steel	0–1	Ashraf Sugar Mills
		Imran Ali 66'

Korangi Baloch Stadium, Karachi
26 November 2011
14:15 PST

Gwadar Port Authority	4–3	Pakistan Public Work Dept.
Tariq Badal 58', 85'; Asif Sarwar 80'; Dur Muhammad 90+1'		Muhammad 47'; M. Jan 51', 57'

Korangi Baloch Stadium, Karachi
28 November 2011
12:00 PST

Ashraf Sugar Mills	1–2	Pakistan Public Work Dept.
M. Azeem 34'		Muhammad 48'; Junaid 87'

Korangi Baloch Stadium, Karachi
28 November 2011
14:15 PST

Sui Southern Gas	0–0	Pakistan Steel

Korangi Baloch Stadium, Karachi
30 November 2011
12:00 PST

Sui Southern Gas	2–1	Ashraf Sugar Mills
Imran 15'; Riaz Ahmed 45'		Wasif Amin 65'

Korangi Baloch Stadium, Karachi
30 November 2011
14:15 PST

Pakistan Steel	3–3	Gwadar Port Authority
A. Wahab 45'; Akram 65'; Fazal 87'		A. Wahid 51'; Asif Sarwar 53'; M. Ali 74'

Korangi Baloch Stadium, Karachi

==== Group B ====
Pos	Team	Pld	W	D	L	GF	GA	GD	Pts	Qualification
1	Pakistan Television	4	3	0	1	5	1	+4	9	Advance to Final stage
2	Zarai Taraqiati	4	2	1	1	5	3	+2	7	Advance to Final stage
3	Higher Education Commission	4	2	1	1	3	3	0	7	
4	Mecca Flour Mills	4	0	2	2	3	5	−2	2	
5	Pakistan Railways	4	0	2	2	4	8	−4	2	

Updated to match(es) played on 28 November 2011. Source: Soccerway
23 November 2011
12:00 PST

Pakistan Railways	2–2	Mecca Flour Mills
Zaheer Abbas 37', 68'		M. Zulfiqar 86' (pen.); M. Imran 92'

Jinnah Sports Stadium, Islamabad
23 November 2011
14:15 PST

Pakistan Television	0–1	Higher Education Commission
		Rehan Iqbal 55'

Jinnah Sports Stadium, Islamabad
25 November 2011
12:00 PST

Mecca Flour Mills	0–0	Zarai Taraqiati

Jinnah Sports Stadium, Islamabad
25 November 2011
14:15 PST

Pakistan Railways	0–3	Pakistan Television
		Hazrat Hussain 74'; Raza Ullah 82', 90+3'

Jinnah Sports Stadium, Islamabad
27 November 2011
12:00 PST

Higher Education Commission	0–2	Zarai Taraqiati
		Izhar Ullah 33'; Iftikhar Hussain 65'

Jinnah Sports Stadium, Islamabad
27 November 2011
14:15 PST

Pakistan Television	1–0	Mecca Flour Mills
Salah-ud-Din 33'

Jinnah Sports Stadium, Islamabad
29 November 2011
12:00 PST

Pakistan Railways	2–3	Zarai Taraqiati
Asif Hameed 68', 84'		Izhar Ullah 23', 52'; Hikmat Ullah 27'

Jinnah Sports Stadium, Islamabad
29 November 2011
14:15 PST

Higher Education Commission	2–1	Mecca Flour Mills
Nauman Shahid 41'; Rashid Masih 55'		Sibtain Abbas 31'

Jinnah Sports Stadium, Islamabad
1 December 2011
12:00 PST

Pakistan Television	1–0	Zarai Taraqiati
Salah-ud-Din 58'

Jinnah Sports Stadium, Islamabad
1 December 2011
14:15 PST

Pakistan Railways	0–0	Higher Education Commission

Jinnah Sports Stadium, Islamabad

=== Final stage (Departmental) ===
Pos	Team	Pld	W	D	L	GF	GA	GD	Pts	Qualification
1	Zarai Taraqiati	3	2	0	1	7	3	+4	6	Promoted to Pakistan Premier League
2	Pakistan Television	3	1	1	1	3	3	0	4	
3	Sui Southern Gas	3	1	1	1	3	4	−1	4	
4	Pakistan Public Work Dept.	3	0	2	1	2	4	−2	2	

Updated to match(es) played on 28 November 2011. Source: Soccerway
12 December 2011
12:00 PST

Zarai Taraqiati	3–0	Sui Southern Gas
Iftikhar Hussain 37', 70'; Izhar Ullah 71'

Railway Stadium, Lahore
12 December 2011
14:00 PST

Pakistan Public Work Dept.	0–0	Pakistan Television

Railway Stadium, Lahore
14 December 2011
12:00 PST

Sui Southern Gas	0–0	Pakistan Public Work Dept.

Railway Stadium, Lahore
14 December 2011
14:15 PST

Pakistan Television	2–0	Zarai Taraqiati
Salah-ud-Din 14', 90+2'

Railway Stadium, Lahore
16 December 2011
10:15 PST

Pakistan Public Work Dept.	2–4	Zarai Taraqiati
Muhammad 10', 65'	Report	Izhar Ullah 32', 77'; Iftikhar Hussain 51'; Hikmat Ullah 87'

Railway Stadium, Lahore
16 December 2011
14:15 PST

Sui Southern Gas	3–1	Pakistan Television
Shahzad 60'; Imran 78'; Riaz Ahmed 90+3'	Report	Salah-ud-Din 81'

Railway Stadium, Lahore

== Federation League finals ==
20 December 2011
13:30 PST

Wohaib	1–3	Zarai Taraqiati
Ahmed Faheem 60'	Report	Izhar Ullah 21'; Iftikhar Hussain 66', 70'

Railway Stadium, Lahore

=== Top goalscorers ===
As of 27 December 2014.

Rank	Player	Club	Goals
1	(Pakistan) Izhar Ullah	Zarai Taraqiati	7
2	(Pakistan) Iftikhar Hussain	Zarai Taraqiati	6
2	(Pakistan) Muhammad	Pakistan Public Work Dept.	6
4	(Pakistan) Ahmed Faheem	Wohaib	5
4	(Pakistan) Salah-ud-Din	Pakistan Television	5
