= 2004 National A Division Football League =

Pakistan Premier League
- Season: 2004
- Dates: 28 May 2004 – 13 October 2004
- Champions: WAPDA; 1st Premier League title 5th Pakistani title
- Relegated: Allied Bank; Young Eleven; Mauripur Baloch; Baloch Quetta; Naka Muhammadan; Mardan
- AFC President's Cup: WAPDA
- Matches: 240
- Goals: 870 (3.63 per match)
- Top goalscorer: Arif Mehmood (20 goals)
- Biggest home win: Habib Bank 15–0 Naka Muhammadan (28 June 2004)
- Biggest away win: Mardan 0–9 Pakistan Army (5 June 2004)
- Highest scoring: Habib Bank 15–0 Naka Muhammadan (28 June 2004)
- Longest winning run: 7 games WAPDA
- Longest unbeaten run: 16 games Pakistan Army
- Longest winless run: 13 games Mardan
- Longest losing run: 13 games Mardan

The 2004 National A Division Football League season was the inaugural season of the newly formed National Football League of Pakistan, the top tier of Pakistani football. The season started on 28 May 2004 and concluded on 13 October 2004.

== Formation ==
In August 2003, the PFF came under new management, as the politician Faisal Saleh Hayat took over. Under the new management, the Pakistan Football Federation phased out the group stage based National Football Championship, and in 2004 introduced the National A Division Football League, With the inception of the newly formed league, provincial and divisional teams were phased out from the top tier and continued their participation in the National Games of Pakistan. In contrast, departmental and armed forces teams remained active in the new league format.

After completion of the season in October 2004, PFF launched the second tier PFF League. In the next 2005 season of the top tier, the National A Division Football League was renamed to the Pakistan Premier League.

== Venues ==
The inaugural 2004 National A Division League was staged in hub rounds rather than strict club-specific home stadiums; Rawalpindi used Army Stadium and KRL Football Stadium, Islamabad round used Naval Sports Complex, with PTCL hosting in the twin cities. The Lahore round used Punjab Stadium, the Karachi round used KMC Stadium and Aga Khan Gymkhana Ground, a Quetta round followed later.

== Teams ==
Eight departmental teams automatically qualified for the league from the 2003 President PFF Cup. They were:

Team	Location
Allied Bank	Lahore
Habib Bank	Karachi
Karachi Port Trust	Karachi
Khan Research Laboratories	Rawalpindi
Pakistan Army	Rawalpindi
Pakistan Navy	Islamabad
PTCL	Islamabad
WAPDA	Lahore

Other eight club teams qualified via regional tournament. Following are the teams qualified from regional tournament:

Team	Location
Afghan Chaman	Chaman
Baloch Quetta	Quetta
Mardan FC	Mardan
Mauripur Baloch	Karachi
Naka Muhammadan	Karachi
Panther Club	Faisalabad
Wohaib	Lahore
Young Eleven	Dera Ismail Khan

== Season summary ==
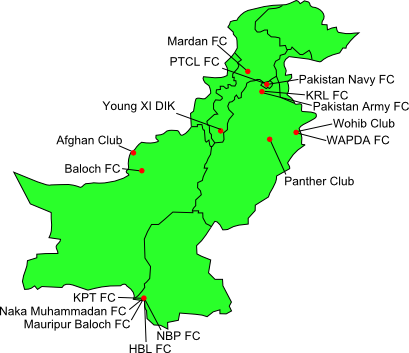
The 16 teams of the inaugural season of the National A Division Football League

Season started on 28 May 2004, Khuda Bakhsh of WAPDA was the first player to score a goal in new Pakistan Premier League when he scored a brace against Allied Bank.

The season saw many one-sided high-scoring matches, as some of the teams lacked in quality and financially. On 28 June, Habib Bank defeated Naka Muhammadan 15–0, the highest scoring match and the biggest victory and loss and most numbers of player (7) scoring in a single match in the history of Pakistan Premier League.

During June, Allied Bank disbanded their team, after refusing to renew the contracts of seven players; but they were able restored their team and returned playing. Bankruptcy hit Naka Muhammadan who withdrew before their 14 July match, they did however returned to complete the season.

The season was dominated by Khan Research Laboratories, Pakistan Army and WAPDA, as they scored a combined goals of 294, each scoring 98 goals, highest ever in Pakistan Premier League.

Due to fixture congestion, WAPDA had to play both their final two matches on the same day, which just happened to be against title rivals Pakistan Army and Khan Research Laboratories. WAPDA and Army drew 2-2, meaning Army were three points ahead at the top of the table, but both shared the same goal difference, and WAPDA still had one match to play.

It meant WAPDA needed to win to finish first, and their opponents, KRL, also needed to win to finish first. In this top of the table clash, it was WAPDA who were victorious, thrashing KRL 4–0 to win the title by a superior goal difference, and be crowned as the first winners of the Pakistan Football League.

Arif Mehmood of WAPDA took the honours as the league's top scorer, with over 20 goals.

At the end of the season, 6 teams were relegated and 2 promoted as league reduced to 12 teams for 2005 after the number of one sided matches. Panther Club escaped relegation thanks to the withdrawal of Allied Bank from the 2005–06 season. National Bank and Pakistan Public Work Department were promoted to the 2005–06 season.

WAPDA represented Pakistan at the 2005 AFC President's Cup by virtue of being the national champions.

WAPDA, Pakistan Army and KRL set a new national record of 98 goals in a season. WAPDA only conceding 12 goals is also a new record.

== League table ==
Pos	Team	Pld	W	D	L	GF	GA	GD	Pts	Qualification or relegation
1	WAPDA	30	23	5	2	98	12	+86	74	Qualification to 2005 AFC President's Cup
2	Pakistan Army	30	23	5	2	98	16	+82	74	
3	Khan Research Laboratories	30	23	4	3	98	24	+74	73	
4	Karachi Port Trust	30	18	7	5	68	34	+34	61	
5	PTCL	30	18	6	6	63	29	+34	60	
6	Pakistan Navy	30	14	11	5	62	28	+34	53	
7	Habib Bank	30	14	7	9	67	35	+32	49	
8	Allied Bank	30	15	3	12	52	40	+12	48	Relegation to 2005–06 PFF National League
9	Afghan Chaman	30	10	7	13	43	46	−3	37	
10	Wohaib	30	9	3	18	37	53	−16	30	
11	Panther Club (Note: Panther were saved from relegation as Allied Bank dissolved their team at the end of the season, saving Panther from relegation due to them being the best placed team in relegation zone.)	30	8	6	16	43	67	−24	30	
12	Young Eleven	30	7	4	19	38	90	−52	25	Relegation to 2005–06 PFF National League
13	Mauripur Baloch	30	6	4	20	25	64	−39	22	Relegation to 2005–06 PFF National League
14	Baloch Quetta	30	5	5	20	26	62	−36	20	Relegation to 2005–06 PFF National League
15	Naka Muhammadan	30	5	0	25	32	154	−122	15	Relegation to 2005–06 PFF National League
16	Mardan	30	3	1	26	20	116	−96	10	Relegation to 2005–06 PFF National League

Updated to match(es) played on 13 October 2004. Source: rsssf
Rules for classification: 1) points; 2) head-to-head points; 3) head-to-head goal difference; 4) goal difference; 5) number of goals scored; 6) drawing of lots

== Results ==
Home \ Away	AFG	ABL	BAL	HBL	KPT	KRL	MAR	MAU	NAK	ARMY	NAVY	PTCL	PAN	WAP	WOH	YOU
Afghan Chaman	—	1–2	2–0	1–1	0–1	1–2	4–0	0–0	5–0	0–2	3–4	0–0	3–1	1–0	1–0	1–1
Allied Bank	0–1	—	5–1	3–1	0–1	1–5	5–0	2–0	5–1	0–3	0–0	0–5	4–0	1–3	4–1	2–0
Baloch Quetta	2–2	0–1	—	0–1	1–2	0–2	2–0	2–1	2–0	0–2	0–1	0–4	1–2	0–3	0–0	1–1
Habib Bank	0–0	5–1	2–0	—	2–0	1–2	3–1	2–0	6–2	0–2	3–1	2–2	1–1	0–1	2–0	5–0
Karachi Port Trust	4–1	4–0	1–3	2–2	—	1–0	4–1	3–0	7–3	2–1	1–1	3–2	6–0	1–3	4–0	3–0
Khan Research Laboratories	1–0	1–1	4–0	1–0	3–1	—	7–1	7–1	10–0	1–0	1–0	2–2	4–1	0–1	3–1	10–0
Mardan	2–4	0–1	1–1	1–4	0–3	0–6	—	0–3	2–5	0–9	0–2	0–3	1–2	0–7	3–0	2–0
Mauripur Baloch	2–3	0–0	2–1	1–1	0–2	1–2	1–2	—	4–0	1–5	1–1	0–2	0–1	0–4	1–0	0–4
Naka Muhammadan	1–8	1–5	3–1	0–15	1–3	1–8	3–1	1–0	—	0–5	2–1	1–3	2–3	0–5	1–6	1–3
Pakistan Army	6–0	1–0	5–0	2–0	1–1	0–0	8–0	4–1	12–0	—	3–1	2–1	2–0	0–0	2–0	4–2
Pakistan Navy	1–0	0–1	2–1	1–1	1–1	0–0	4–0	4–0	10–0	2–2	—	2–1	1–1	0–0	2–1	8–1
PTCL	2–0	1–0	3–0	2–0	0–0	1–4	4–1	2–1	2–0	2–3	1–1	—	1–1	2–1	1–0	4–2
Panther Club	2–0	1–4	1–1	1–3	2–3	2–7	3–0	1–2	8–2	0–2	1–4	0–2	—	0–4	1–2	4–1
WAPDA	6–0	2–0	3–1	5–1	2–0	4–0	10–0	6–0	8–0	2–2	1–1	1–0	1–1	—	3–0	4–1
Wohaib	1–1	1–0	4–2	2–1	2–2	0–1	5–0	0–1	4–1	0–3	0–2	1–4	5–0	0–4	—	2–3
Young Eleven	2–0	0–4	2–3	0–2	2–2	2–4	3–1	2–1	2–0	0–5	1–4	1–4	2–2	0–4	0–3	—

Updated to match(es) played on 13 October 2004. Source: RSSSF
Legend: Blue = home team win; Yellow = draw; Red = away team win.

== Statistics ==
=== Top scorers ===
As of 13 October 2004

Rank	Scorer	Club	Goals
1	Arif Mehmood	WAPDA	20
2	Imran Hussain	Pakistan Army	19
3	Qadeer Ahmed	Khan Research Laboratories	17
3	Khuda Bakhsh	WAPDA	17

=== Hat-tricks ===
As of 13 October 2004

Player	Nationality	For	Against	Result	Date	Ref
Asim Faiz	Pakistan	Karachi Port Trust	Naka Muhammadan	7–3	22 June 2004	
Pervaiz Ahmed	Pakistan	Habib Bank	Naka Muhammadan	15–0	28 June 2004	
Abdul Samad^{4}	Pakistan	Habib Bank	Naka Muhammadan	15–0	28 June 2004	
Abdul Qadeer^{5}	Pakistan	Khan Research Laboratories	Young Eleven	10–0	3 July 2004	
Atiq	Pakistan	Khan Research Laboratories	Young Eleven	10–0	3 July 2004	
Mohammad Sadiq	Pakistan	Afghan Chaman	Naka Muhammadan	5–0	12 July 2004	
Fareed Khan^{5}	Pakistan	Karachi Port Trust	Panther Club	6–0	28 July 2004	
Muhammad Arshad	Pakistan	Wohaib	Naka Muhammadan	6–1	29 July 2004	
Imran Hussain	Pakistan	Pakistan Army	Naka Muhammadan	5–0	8 August 2004	
Imran Hussain	Pakistan	Pakistan Army	Mauripur Baloch	5–1	13 August 2004	
Inayatullah^{4}	Pakistan	Afghan Chaman	Naka Muhammadan	8–1	17 August 2004	
Ahmed Shah	Pakistan	Afghan Chaman	Naka Muhammadan	8–1	17 August 2004	
Arif Mehmood	Pakistan	WAPDA	Naka Muhammadan	5–0	22 August 2004	
Jaffar Hussain	Pakistan	Pakistan Army	Baloch Nushki	5–0	9 September 2004	
Zulfiqar Ali Shah	Pakistan	WAPDA	Mauripur Baloch	6–0	12 September 2004	
Khuda Bakhsh	Pakistan	WAPDA	Afghan Chaman	6–0	15 September 2004	
Arif Mehmood	Pakistan	WAPDA	Afghan Chaman	6–0	15 September 2004	

^{4} Player scored 4 goals
^{5} Player scored 5 goals.
