= Zarai Taraqiati Bank Limited FC =

Former association football club in Pakistan

Zarai Taraqiati Football Club
- Full name: Zarai Taraqiati Bank Limited Football Club
- Short name: ZTBL
- Dissolved: 2014; 11 years ago
- Ground: Jinnah Sports Stadium
- Capacity: 48,200
- Parental Organisation: Zarai Taraqiati Bank Limited
Home colours	Away colours

Zarai Taraqiati Football Club served as the football section of the Zarai Taraqiati Bank Limited, formerly known as Agriculture Development Bank of Pakistan. In its brief history, the club won the Football Federation League, the second tier of Pakistani football in the second year after its inception.

Based in Islamabad, the club played their home games at Jinnah Sports Stadium, Islamabad.

== History ==
=== Early years ===
In 2010, the club competed in the 2010 Pakistan Football Federation League; they were placed in the group B with Ashraf Sugar Mills, Pakistan Railways and Pakistan Television. On 29 November 2010, the club played its first-ever competitive match, ending in a 2–0 loss to Pakistan Television. Four days later they lost to Pakistan Railways with a similar scoreline. On 1 December 2010, the club recorded its first ever victory when they defeated Ashraf Sugar Mills 2–1. The club finished third in their group and failed to qualify for the final stages.

=== Success ===
In 2011–12 the club once again competed in the Football Federation League. The club finished second in their group, winning three consecutive matches against Higher Education Commission, Mecca Flour Mills and Pakistan Railways before losing the final league game to rivals Pakistan Television. Both Zarai Taraqiati and Pakistan Television advanced to final stage, Zarai Taraqiati won topped their group two points ahead of Pakistan Television and got promotion to Pakistan Premier League winning 2 out of 3 games, losing their only game to rival Pakistan Television. They defeated Wohaib 3–1 in the finals of 2011–12 Pakistan Football Federation League to win the second division title.

On 7 September 2012, the club played their first ever 2012–13 Pakistan Premier League match against title-holders Khan Research Laboratories in a 0–3 loss at home. The club went 7 matches without any win, drawing four and losing three matches. The club recorded their first win of the season against Baloch Quetta in a 1–0 victory. On 17 September, the defeated Karachi Port Trust 2–0, causing a major upset, and on 25 December, completed the double over Karachi Port Trust when they defeated them 2–1 away. The club ended its first top-flight season with just victories from 30 matches and finished at 14th place, two points above relegation zone.

=== Downfall and dissolution ===
Zarai Taraqiati started their 2013–14 Pakistan Premier League with 3–0 defeat to Pakistan Air Force. Their first victory of the campaign came against Pakistan Navy with a 2–0 away win. The club recorded their biggest victory after defeating newly promoted Pak Afghan Clearing 3–0 away.

They withdrew after playing just seventeen games. After ZTBL’s top authorities learned that the team would be relegated to the second-tier league, they stopped them from playing any more matches. Thus they forfeited 13 matches which was against the rules. Soon after withdrawing from the league, the parental organisation dissolved the team.

== Honours ==
- Football Federation League
  - Champions (1): 2011–12
