= 1993–94 Asian Cup Winners' Cup =

Tournament details
- Teams: 18

Final positions
- Champions: (Saudi Arabia) Al-Qadisiya (1st title)
- Runners-up: (Hong Kong) South China

The 1993–94 Asian Cup Winners' Cup was the fourth edition of association football competition run by the Asian Football Confederation specifically for its members cup holders.

== First round ==
Team 1	Agg.	Team 2	1st leg	2nd leg
Al Wahda (Bahrain)	2–4	(Saudi Arabia) Al Qadisiya	1–0	1–4
New Radiant (Maldives)	5–0	(Pakistan) Youth League FC	3–0	2–0
Persepolis (Iran)	2–2 (a)	(Kuwait) Al Salmiya	0–1	2–1
Al Arabi (Qatar)	(w/o)^{1}	(United Arab Emirates) Al Nasr		
Nissan (Japan)	6–0	(Philippines) Philippine Air Force F.C.	5–0	1–0
Cảng Sài Gòn (Vietnam)	(w/o)^{2}	(Malaysia) Sarawak		
East Bengal (India)	6–4	(Iraq) Al Zawraa	6–2	0–2
South China (Hong Kong)	2–1	(China) Dalian	2–0	0–1
Mohammedan (Bangladesh)	bye			
Semen Padang (Indonesia)	bye			

^{1} Al Nasr withdrew
^{2} Sarawak withdrew

== Second round ==
Team 1	Agg.	Team 2	1st leg	2nd leg
Mohammedan (Bangladesh)	(w/o)^{1}	(Maldives) New Radiant	8–0	
Semen Padang (Indonesia)	2–1	(Vietnam) Cảng Sài Gòn	1–0	1–1
East Bengal (India)	1–5	(Hong Kong) South China	0–1	1–4
Al Qadisiya (Saudi Arabia)	bye			
Persepolis (Iran)	bye			
Al Arabi (Qatar)	bye			
Nissan (Japan)	bye			

^{1} New Radiant qualified for the quarter-final after Mohammedan failed to appear for the second leg due to financial problems.

== Quarter-finals ==
Team 1	Agg.	Team 2	1st leg	2nd leg
Al Qadisiya (Saudi Arabia)	(w/o)^{1}	(Maldives) New Radiant		
Persepolis (Iran)	2–3	(Qatar) Al Arabi	1–1	1–2
Semen Padang (Indonesia)	2–12	(Japan) Nissan	2–1	0–11
South China (Hong Kong)	bye			

^{1} New Radiant withdrew

== Semi-finals ==
Team 1	Agg.	Team 2	1st leg	2nd leg
Al Arabi (Qatar)	1–2	(Saudi Arabia) Al Qadisiya	1–1	0–1
South China (Hong Kong)	(w/o)^{1}	(Japan) Nissan		

^{1} Nissan withdrew

== Final ==
Team 1	Agg.	Team 2	1st leg	2nd leg
South China (Hong Kong)	2–6	(Saudi Arabia) Al-Qadisiya	2–4	0–2

=== First leg ===
19 March 1994

South China (Hong Kong)	2–4	(Saudi Arabia) Al-Qadisiya

Hong Kong Stadium, Hong Kong

=== Second leg ===
11 April 1994

Al-Qadisiya (Saudi Arabia)	2–0	(Hong Kong) South China
Saleh Al-Qanbar 64' (pen.); Ghazi Asiri	Report

Prince Saud bin Jalawi Stadium, Khobar
Referee: Fayez Betar (Syria)
