= 2007–08 PFF League =

PFF League
- Season: 2007-08
- Dates: 7 November 2007 – 30 January 2008
- Champions: Pak Elektron
- Promoted: Pak Elektron; Pakistan Steel
- Matches: 57
- Goals: 131 (2.3 per match)

The 2007–08 PFF League was the 4th season of PFF League, second tier of Pakistan Football Federation. The season started on 7 November 2007 concluded on 30 January 2008. Pak Electron were declared the champions, and gained promotion to the 2008–09 Pakistan Premier League along with the second-placed Pakistan Steel.

== Format ==
Fifteen teams competed in the tournament. However, Sindh Government Press FC withdrew before the tournament started. In the group stage, teams were divided into two groups of seven teams each, playing each other in a round-robin format. Top three teams from each group progressed to the Super Six stage, where they had to play against each other in another round-robin league. Top two teams from the Super Six stage were promoted to the 2008–09 Pakistan Premier League, with the top team being declared as the PFF League champion.

== Groups ==
=== Group A ===
Pos	Team	Pld	W	D	L	GF	GA	GD	Pts	Qualification
1	Pakistan Air Force	6	5	1	0	10	3	+7	11	Qualification for the Super Six stage
2	Pak Elektron	6	4	0	2	12	4	+8	8	Qualification for the Super Six stage
3	Pakistan Ordnance Factories	6	4	0	2	10	8	+2	8	Qualification for the Super Six stage
4	Panther Club	6	3	0	3	9	4	+5	6	
5	Bannu Red	6	2	1	3	12	10	+2	5	
6	Dera Eleven	6	1	2	3	4	8	−4	4	
7	Higher Education Commission	6	0	0	6	3	23	−20	0	

7 November 2007

Pakistan Air Force	0–0	Dera Eleven
	Report

10 November 2007

Bannu Red	1–1	Dera Eleven
	Report

10 November 2007

Pakistan Air Force	2–1	Pakistan Ordnance Factories
	Report

13 November 2007

Panther Club	2–0	Dera Eleven
	Report

13 November 2007

Bannu Red	2–3	Dera Eleven
	Report

15 November 2007

Pakistan Ordnance Factories	3–1	Dera Eleven
	Report

16 November 2007

Pakistan Air Force	2–1	Bannu Red
	Report

17 November 2007

Pak Elektron	1–0	Panther Club
	Report

22 November 2007

Pakistan Air Force	2–0	Panther Club
	Report

25 November 2007

Pakistan Ordnance Factories	1–0	Panther Club
	Report

28 November 2007

Pak Elektron	3–0	Pakistan Ordnance Factories
	Report

30 November 2007

Pakistan Air Force	3–0	Higher Education Commission
	Report

30 November 2007

Bannu Red	1–0	Panther Club
	Report

3 December 2007

Pak Elektron	2–1	Bannu Red
	Report

4 December 2007

Dera Eleven	2–0	Higher Education Commission
	Report

7 December 2007

Bannu Red	6–2	Higher Education Commission
	Report

7 December 2007

Pakistan Air Force	6–2	Pak Elektron
	Report

10 December 2007

Pak Elektron	4–0	Higher Education Commission
	Report

11 December 2007

Panther Club	6–1	Higher Education Commission
	Report

12 December 2007

Pak Elektron	2–0	Dera Eleven
	Report

13 December 2007

Pakistan Ordnance Factories	2–0	Higher Education Commission
	Report

=== Group B ===
Pos	Team	Pld	W	D	L	GF	GA	GD	Pts	Qualification
1	Sui Southern Gas	6	3	2	1	7	4	+3	8	Qualification for the Super Six stage
2	Pakistan Steel	6	3	1	2	5	4	+1	7	Qualification for the Super Six stage
3	Pakistan Public Works Department	6	3	1	2	4	3	−1	7	Qualification for the Super Six stage
5	Baloch Nushki	6	2	3	1	4	2	−2	7	
4	Baloch Quetta	6	1	4	1	7	6	−1	6	
6	Pakistan Police	6	0	4	2	2	6	−4	4	
7	Mauripur Baloch	6	0	3	3	1	5	−4	3	
8	Sindh Government Press	withdrew from the tournament								

5 November 2007

Baloch Quetta	1–1	Baloch Nushki
	Report

7 November 2007

Pakistan Steel	1–1	Baloch Quetta
	Report

8 November 2007

Baloch Nushki	1–0	Sui Southern Gas Company
	Report

9 November 2007

Pakistan Police	0–0	Pakistan Public Works Department
	Report

10 November 2007

Baloch Nushki	2–0	Pakistan Steel
	Report

12 November 2007

Pakistan Public Works Department	2–1	Baloch Quetta
	Report

13 November 2007

Sui Southern Gas Company	1–1	Pakistan Police
	Report

15 November 2007

Sui Southern Gas Company	2–2	Baloch Quetta
	Report

16 November 2007

Pakistan Public Works Department	1–0	Baloch Nushki
	Report

17 November 2007

Pakistan Police	0–2	Baloch Quetta
	Report

19 November 2007

Baloch Nushki	0–0	Mauripur Baloch
	Report

21 November 2007

Pakistan Police	1–1	Mauripur Baloch
	Report

24 November 2007

Baloch Nushki	0–0	Pakistan Police
	Report

25 November 2007

Pakistan Steel	1–0	Pakistan Public Works Department
	Report

26 November 2007

Baloch Quetta	0–0	Mauripur Baloch
	Report

28 November 2007

Baloch Nushki	0–0	Mauripur Baloch
	Report

29 November 2007

Sui Southern Gas Company	2–0	Mauripur Baloch
	Report

2 December 2007

Pakistan Steel	1–0	Mauripur Baloch
	Report

3 December 2007

Sui Southern Gas Company	1–0	Pakistan Public Works Department
	Report

6 December 2007

Sui Southern Gas Company	1–0	Pakistan Steel
	Report

8 December 2007

Pakistan Public Works Department	1–0	Mauripur Baloch
	Report

== Super Six ==
Pos	Team	Pld	W	D	L	GF	GA	GD	Pts	Qualification
1	Pak Elektron (winners) (Note: Pak Elektron declared winners on league position.)	5	3	2	0	9	4	+5	11	Promoted to 2008–09 Pakistan Premier League
2	Pakistan Steel[lower-alpha 1][lower-alpha 2]	5	3	2	0	8	3	+5	11	Promoted to 2008–09 Pakistan Premier League
3	Sui Southern Gas Company	5	2	1	2	6	6	0	7	Stay in Football Federation League
4	Pakistan Air Force	5	1	4	0	8	5	+3	7	Stay in Football Federation League
5	Pakistan Public Works Department	5	1	1	3	8	7	+1	4	Stay in Football Federation League
6	Pakistan Ordnance Factories	5	0	0	5	2	16	−14	0	Stay in Football Federation League

11 January 2007

Pakistan Steel	1–1	Pak Elektron
Muhammad Akmal (32')	Report	Muhammad Muneer (40')

Pakistan Steel Ground, Karachi
12 January 2007

Pakistan Air Force	1–1	Pakistan Public Works Department
Ghulam Muhammad	Report	Nauman (85')

Pakistan Steel Ground, Karachi
12 January 2007

Sui Southern Gas Company	4–0	Pakistan Ordnance Factories
Muhammad Rasheed (3 goals); Muhammad Ishaq (1 goal)	Report

Pakistan Steel Ground, Karachi
14 January 2007

Pakistan Steel	0–0	Pakistan Air Force
	Report

Pakistan Steel Ground, Karachi
14 January 2007

Pakistan Public Works Department	5–0	Pakistan Ordnance Factories
	Report

Pakistan Steel Ground, Karachi
16 January 2007

Pak Elektron	2–0	Sui Southern Gas Company
Amir Hamza (68'); Muzaffar (71')	Report

Pakistan Steel Ground, Karachi
16 January 2007

Pakistan Steel	3–1	Pakistan Ordnance Factories
Abdul Wahab (60', 67'); Muhammad Akmal (65')	Report	Manzoor Shah (50')

Pakistan Steel Ground, Karachi
22 January 2007

Pak Elektron	1–1	Pakistan Air Force
Ejaz (78'p)	Report	Iqbal (26'p)

Model Town Academy Ground, Lahore
24 January 2007

Pak Elektron	3–2	Pakistan Public Works Department
Munner (73'); Amir Hamza (83', 88')	Report	Mobeen (20'); Gul Muhammad (21')

Model Town Academy Ground, Lahore
26 January 2007

Pakistan Air Force	2–1	Pakistan Ordnance Factories
Iqbal (34'); Amir (79')	Report	Manzoor Shah (37')

PAF Sports Complex, Islamabad
27 January 2007

Pakistan Steel	2–1	Sui Southern Gas Company
Akram (28'); Muhammad Bux (85')	Report	Ata Ullah (6')

PAF Sports Complex, Islamabad
28 January 2007

Sui Southern Gas Company	1–0	Pakistan Public Works Department
Aftab (21')

PAF Sports Complex, Islamabad
29 January 2007

Pak Elektron	2–0	Pakistan Ordnance Factories
Zafar (13'); Amir Hamza (79')	Report

PAF Sports Complex, Islamabad
30 January 2007

Pakistan Steel	2–0	Pakistan Public Works Department
Karim Baksh (45'); Nadir Ali (56')	Report

PAF Sports Complex, Islamabad
30 January 2007

Pakistan Air Force	2–2	Sui Southern Gas Company
Imran (70'p, 80'p)	Report	Nauman (15', 33)

PAF Sports Complex, Islamabad
