= Naka Muhammadan FC =

Pakistani football club

Naka Muhammadan
- Full name: Naka Muhammadan Football Club

Naka Muhammadan Football Club is a Pakistani football club based in the locality of Lyari in Karachi, Sindh. The club is one of the founder members of the Pakistan Premier League, and played at the top tier in 2004. It has also participated in the Karachi Football League, winning the 2015–16 edition.

== History ==
In the early 2000s, the team was recorded participating in national inter-club tournaments of Pakistan.

In 2004, Naka Muhammadan became one of the founding members of the Pakistan Premier League, qualifying by winning all three matches in the provincial qualifying group. It was one of local clubs of Pakistan to appear in Pakistan Premier League, in a tournament dominated by departmental teams during that time. It made its professional debut in the inaugural 2004 National League. The team suffered financial problems and withdrew from the league, but subsequently came back to complete the remaining matches. The club finisbed second-last at 15th position with 15 points, hence becoming relegated. The team also participated in the 2005 National Challenge Cup, the top tier national cup competition finishing last in the group 2 of pool D.

The next season, marred in financial constraints, the team decided not to enter the second tier 2005–06 PFF League.

In 2014, the team participated in the Coca Cola Lyari Football Championship.
