= Satiana =

Pakistani town

Satiana Bunglaw
- Village
- Location on Faisalabad-Tandlianwala road, Pakistan
- Coordinates: 31°12′06.47″N 73°10′12.17″E
- Country: Pakistan
- Province: Punjab
- District: Faisalabad

Satiana Bunglaw is a small town in Jaranwala Tehsil, Faisalabad District, Punjab, Pakistan. Located 27 km from Faisalabad, 25 km from Jaranwala, and 23 km from Tandlianwala, it is located on the Tandlianwala-Faisalabad road. Satiana is well connected by road to nearby cities, including Faisalabad, Tandlianwala, Okara, Jaranwala, Samundri, and Dijkot, in addition to many surrounding villages.

The city features higher secondary schools for both boys and girls, a market with approximately 300 shops, a government hospital, and essential services such as Satiana Post Office (PO#37450), banks, and a registration office of the National Database and Registration Authority (NADRA). Satiana falls within National Assembly constituency NA-103 and Punjab Provincial Assembly constituency PP-102.
