= Karachi Football League =

Karachi Football League کراچی فٹ بال لیگ
- Founded: 1937; 89 years ago (restarted in 2003; 23 years ago)
- Country: Pakistan
- Number of clubs: 20
- Most championships: Burma Muhammadan; Shahzad Muhammadan (2 titles)

The Karachi Football League is a city based football league held in Karachi, in Pakistan's Sindh province.

== History ==
=== Origins ===
On a few known occasions, city league championships were played in Pakistan stretching back to 1937 before the independence of Pakistan, including in Karachi.

By the 1950s, a Karachi Senior Division Football League was held based on promotion and relegation with the second tier Karachi Second Division Football League. Matches were usually held at the Polo Ground.

In the 1990s, a departmental team based K-League was organised Hassan Musa of PIA.

=== Karachi Football League (2003–2016) ===
In 2003, a revamped edition of the league was held again a year before the foundation of the top tier Pakistan Premier League, this time organised by Karachi United and sponsored by KASB Bank as the KASB Premier League. From 2003 until 2008, the league was sponsored by "KASB Group of Companies" which was the Title Sponsor of the event for the first six editions. Coca-Cola Pakistan became the consequent league sponsor. Among the various leagues established in the country, the Karachi League and the Pakistan Premier League reportedly remained the most consistent in terms of structure and continuity.

The regional Karachi league which aimed at promoting club-level football in Karachi, had been compared to the top flight Pakistan Premier League which had a dominance of departmental and military teams, thus resulting in poor attendances. In comparison, the Karachi Football League, although a regional competition, the league consistently attracted large audiences, including a reported 18,000 spectators at the 2008–09 final between Shahzad Muhammadan and Nazimabad FC at KMC Stadium. The playoff matches of some seasons were broadcast on Ten Sports.

The Karachi League clubs were amateur outfits, so the players didn't ordinarily get paid, and all costs were borne by the hosts Karachi United by themselves or through sponsors.

In February 2022, mayor of Karachi Murtaza Wahab announced the return of the league after inactivity.

== Format ==
The Pakistan Premier League employs a promotion and relegation system with the PFF League. The Karachi League, however, functioned differently due to the high number of local clubs. Typically, around eight clubs retained their places annually, while the rest were nominated by Karachi’s district football associations.

In 2003, the season saw 10 clubs competing on a single league basis. In the 2008 season, the league expanded to 16 clubs, with the top eight clubs competing in a playoff. In 2014 season, 20 teams were divided into two groups. After league matches, top four teams from each group progressed into the round-robin Super League phase. The top four teams of the Super League phase then made it to the semi-finals. This structure resembled a playoff-based format akin to the MLS, rather than a traditional league system.

== Winners ==
- 2003: Hyderi Baloch Club
- 2004–05: Lyari Labour Welfare Centre
- 2005–06: Young Ansari
- 2006–07: Keamari Muhammadan
- 2007–08: Shahzad Muhammadan
- 2008–09: Shahzad Muhammadan
- 2009–10: Chanesar Blue
- 2010–11: Baloch Youth Garden
- 2011–12: Burma Muhammadan
- 2012–13: Baloch Mujahid
- 2013–14: Khyber Muslim
- 2014–15: Burma Muhammadan
- 2015–16: Mauripur Baloch

== See also ==
- Pakistan Premier League
- Pakistan Football Federation
