= Youth League FC =

Pakistani football club

- Short name: YLFC

Youth League Football Club, is a Pakistani football club based in Abbottabad, Pakistan. The club featured at the 1993–94 Asian Cup Winners' Cup, the club competition contested annually by the winners of domestic cup competitions across Asia.

== History ==
In 1993, the team won the Lifebuoy Trophy with services of players such as Gohar Zaman. Hence the club featured at the 1993–94 Asian Cup Winners' Cup, captained by Pakistani international defender Iftikhar Ali, losing in both legs against Maldivian side New Radiant by 0–3 and 0–2.

== Performance in AFC competitions ==
Win Draw Loss

Season	Competition	Round	Club	First leg	Second leg	Aggregate
1993–94	Asian Cup Winners' Cup	First Round	(Maldives) New Radiant	0–3	0–2	0–5

== Honours ==
=== Domestic ===
- Lifebuoy Trophy
  - Winners (1): 1993
