= Mauripur Baloch FC =

Pakistani football club

Mauripur Baloch
- Full name: Mauripur Baloch Football Club
- Founded: 1945; 81 years ago
- League: PFF League
- 2007–08 PFF League: 7th

Mauripur Baloch Football Club (Urdu: ماریپور بلوچ فٹبال کلب) is a Pakistani football club based in the locality of Mauripur in west Karachi, Sindh. It last competed in the PFF League. The club is one of the founder members of the Pakistan Premier League, established in 2004. It has also participated in the Karachi Football League, winning the 2015–16 edition.

The club also contain youth teams.

== History ==
=== Early years ===
The club was founded in 1945, two years before the independence of Pakistan.

In 1967, the team played at a football tournament in Larkana.

In the 1980s and 1990s, the club produced several players for the Pakistan national team including Zafar Iqbal, Nawaz Rehman and Farooq Rehman.

In 2002, the club participated in the All-Karachi Quaid-e-Azam Cup Floodlit Football Tournament, losing by 0–1 against Tanzeem Sports. The tournament was eventually abandoned around 18 December due to a conflict between two factions in the Sindh Football Association.

=== Entry in the top-tier (2004–2005) ===
In 2004, Mauripur Baloch became one of the founding members of the Pakistan Premier League, qualifying by winning all three matches in the provincial qualifying group. It was one of local clubs of Pakistan to appear in Pakistan Premier League, in a tournament dominated by departmental teams during that time. It made its professional debut in the inaugural 2004 National League, finishing the season in relegation zone at 13th position with 22 points. The team participated in the 2005 National Challenge Cup, finishing last in the group 1 of pool D. The club also participated the same year in a local tournament in Karachi winning by 4–3 against Golden Star.

=== PFF League (2005–2008) ===
In the second-tier 2005–06 PFF National League, the club failed to advance to the next round after finishing third in the group A behind K-Electric and Sindh Government Press.

In the next 2006 PFF League, the club again finished third in the group stage behind SSGC and PMC, failing to advance to the next round. It again failed to advance in the 2007–08 PFF League.

=== Later years (2008–present) ===
The club subsequently participated in the Karachi Football League. In the 2010–11 season, it finished runner-ups after losing in the final by 1–2 against Baloch Youth Garden. In 2016, the club won the title after winning 4–2 in the penalties after a goalless draw against Baloch Mujahid.

In 2023, the team participated in the KPT Football Challenge Cup, featuring Pakistan international cricketers Javed Miandad and Younis Khan as guests.

== Competitive record ==
The club's competitive records since the 2004–05 season are listed below.

Season	Div	Tms	Pos	National Challenge Cup	AFC President's Cup	AFC Cup
2004–05	Pakistan Premier League	16	13	DNP	DNP	DNP
2005–06	PFF League	12	Group stage	Group stage	DNP	DNP
2006–07	PFF League	8	Group stage	DNP	DNP	DNP
2007–08	PFF League	14	Group stage	DNP	DNP	DNP

== Honours ==
- Karachi Football League:
  - 2015–16
