= Panther FC =

Pakistani football club

Panther Club
- Full name: Panther Football Club
- Ground: Panther Ground, Faisalabad

Panther Football Club is a Pakistani football club based in Faisalabad, Punjab. The club was one of the founding members of the Pakistan Premier League, established in 2004. The club also contained youth teams. It has produced notable players, such as Samar Ishaq, a former captain of the Pakistan national team. The club competes at the Panther Ground in Chak 41-JB in Satiana, Faisalabad.

== History ==
Panther Club made its professional debut in the 2004–05 Pakistan Premier League, finishing the season at 11th position with 30 points, but avoiding relegation due to Allied Bank dissolving their team. The club got relegated in the following season, finishing 11th again, with 20 points. The team participated in the 2005 National Challenge Cup, finishing first in group C, which also comprised Railways, Wohaib and City FC from Lahore. In the second stage, the club finished last behind KRL, WAPDA, KESC, Navy and Police. In the 2006 PFF National League, the club failed to qualify for the second stage where it was grouped with Pakistan Television, HEC, and Dera XI. In the next 2007–08 PFF League, the club finished 4th in the group A comprising seven teams, failing to qualify for the next stage.

== Rivalry ==
Panther Club had a rivalry with Lahore club Wohaib. During the 2005–06 season, match referee Abdul Jabbar was manhandled by angered Wohaib club players after he gave a goal to Panthers Club in the 87th minute. Under pressure, the referee reversed the decision and disallowed the goal but was beaten again by spectators. The first leg of the season saw Wohaib winning by 3–1. On 19 October 2005, Panther recorded a crucial win against Wohaib in the relegation battle by a lone goal.

== Competitive record ==
The club's competitive records since the 2004–05 season are listed below.

Season	Div	Tms	Pos	National Challenge Cup	AFC President's Cup	AFC Cup
2004–05	Pakistan Premier League	16	11	DNP	DNP	DNP
2005–06	Pakistan Premier League	12	11	Second stage	DNP	DNP
2007–08	Football Federation League	13	Group stage	DNP	DNP	DNP
