= Young Eleven FC =

Pakistani football club

- Full name: Young Eleven Football Club
- Nickname: Dera Eleven
- League: PFF League
- 2009–10 PFF League: Group stage

Young Eleven Football Club, also known as Dera Eleven, is a Pakistani football club based in Dera Ismail Khan, Khyber Pakhtunkhwa. It last competed in the PFF League, the second-tier competition in the Pakistan football league system. The club is one of the founder members of the Pakistan Premier League, established in 2004. The club also contain youth teams.

== History ==
In 2004, Young Eleven became one of the founding members of the Pakistan Premier League, qualifying through their provincial qualifying group along with Mardan FC from Mardan. It was one of local clubs of Pakistan to appear in Pakistan Premier League, in a tournament dominated by departmental teams during that time. It made its professional debut in 2004–05 Pakistan Premier League, finishing the season in relegation zone at 12th position with 25 points. In the 2005–06 PFF National League, the club advanced to the second round after finishing second in the group D behind Pakistan Air Force, but failed to advance to the semifinals. The team withdrew from the 2005 National Challenge Cup, the same year.

In the next 2006 PFF League, the club finished last in the group stage, failing to advance to the next round. It again failed to advance in the 2007–08 PFF League. After a hiatus in 2008–09, the club participated in the 2009–10 PFF League, finishing third in the group B of the club leg, again failing to advance to the second stage.

In 2014, the club won in the final against Karwan FC led by international goalkeeper Saqib Hanif in a local tournament in Mianwali, which included Pakistan internationals as guest players.

== Competitive record ==
The club's competitive records since the 2004–05 season are listed below.

| Season | Div | Tms | Pos | National Challenge Cup | AFC President's Cup | AFC Cup |
|---|---|---|---|---|---|---|
| 2004–05 | Pakistan Premier League | 16 | 12 | DNP | DNP | DNP |
| 2005–06 | PFF League | 12 | Final group stage | DNP | DNP | DNP |
| 2006–07 | PFF League | 8 | Group stage | DNP | DNP | DNP |
| 2007–08 | PFF League | 14 | Group stage | DNP | DNP | DNP |
| 2009–10 | PFF League | 18 | Group stage | DNP | DNP | DNP |
