= Pakistan Steel F.C. =

Pakistani football club

Pakistan Steel
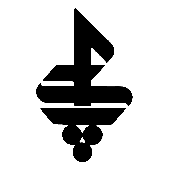
- Full name: Pakistan Steel Football Club
- Nickname: The Steel
- Short name: PSFC
- Dissolved: 2020; 6 years ago
- Stadium: Quaid-e-Azam Sports Complex, Steel Town, Karachi
- Owner: Pakistan Steel Mills

Pakistan Steel Football Club served as the football section of Pakistan Steel Mills. Nicknamed The Steel, the club was based outside the city of Karachi in the Pakistan Steel Township.

== History ==
The club played in the 2008–09 Pakistan Premier League after winning promotion on account of being the runner-up in the 2007–08 PFF League. It again played in the 2020 PFF League.

In 2020, Pakistan Steel disbanded their sport teams including football. Subsequently, 44 players of different sports disciplines of Pakistan Steel Mills were transferred to security departmental jobs.

== Stadium ==
The Pakistan Steel Township contains the Quaid-e-Azam Sports Complex football ground, which served as the home ground of Pakistan Steel. The venue hosted matches in the Pakistan Premier League and the second-tier PFF League, and was also one of the venues of the 2010 KPT-PFF Cup.
