= Wohaib FC =

Pakistani football club

Wohaib
- Full name: Hafiz Wohaib Butt Memorial Football Club
- Founded: 1982; 44 years ago
- Ground: Punjab University Old Campus Ground
- Capacity: 1,000
- League: PFF League Division B
Home colours	Away colours

Hafiz Wohaib Butt Memorial Football Club (Urdu: حافظ وہیب بٹ میموریل فٹ بال کلب), commonly known as Wohaib FC, is a professional football club based in Lahore, Punjab, Pakistan. The club last competed in the 2020 PFF League, the second tier of Pakistani football.

In the early 1990s, Wohaib was one of the leading football clubs in Pakistan, experiencing its height between 1991 and 1994, when club's chairman Hafiz Salman Butt had a successful tenure as general secretary of the Pakistan Football Federation. Wohaib is the first Pakistani club to pass the qualifying round of the Asian Club Championship, doing so in the 1992–93 edition. The club also contains youth teams.

== History ==
=== Establishment and early years ===
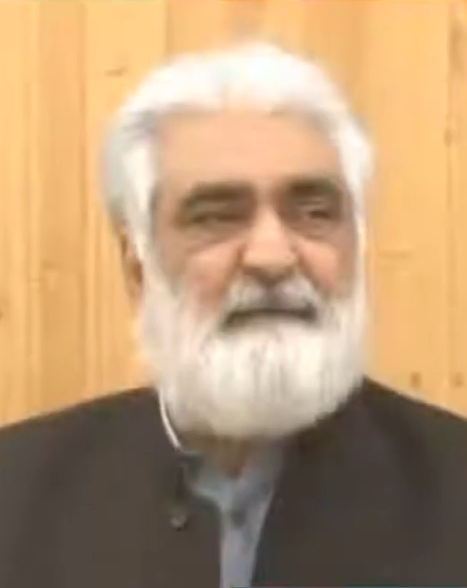
Hafiz Salman Butt, the club's founder and chairman from 1982 till 2021

The club was formed in December 1982 by member of the National Assembly of Pakistan Hafiz Salman Butt in memory of his deceased younger brother Hafiz Wohaib Butt.

=== Short-lived glory (1990s) ===
By the early 1990s, Wohaib FC had established itself as the leading football club in Lahore. It offered aspiring footballers the opportunity to compete at the National Football Championship and secure full-time positions in various leading domestic departmental teams such as WAPDA, Pakistan Airlines, among others. The team experienced its height between 1992 and 1994, when club's chairman Hafiz Salman Butt had a successful tenure as general secretary of the Pakistan Football Federation participating in the 1992–93 and 1993–94 seasons of the revamped National Football Championship by Salman on a proper league-style basis and spread over a number of months, along with several sponsorships. However in these years, Salman was also accused of being biased towards players who were not from Lahore, and often preferring his club players to represent the national team.

==== Asian Club Championship (1992–93) ====
The club participated in the 1992–93 Asian Club Championship, where it managed to become the first Pakistani club to pass the qualifying round of an Asian competition. A reason of Wohaib’s success in the qualifying stage was the sheer recruiting of Pakistani international footballers. Before the implementation of stricter rules and regulations for player registrations by the Asian Football Confederation, it was common for several club sides across Asia to borrow the premiere players from other teams for registration to compete at Asian club competitions. The club borrowed five regular starters of the Pakistan national team for the tournament; Zafar Iqbal and Saleem Patni from PIA, Mateen Akhtar and Shabbir Hussain from WAPDA, and Nauman Khan from Pakistan Army, who combined with Wohaib's best talent. Tariq Lutfi was also appointed honorary head coach for the competition.

The team first lost against Club Valencia from Maldives by 1–2 in their first away match in Malé on 19 September 1992, however the club managed to overcome the score in the return leg after defeating the Maldivian side at the Railway Stadium in Lahore on 27 September. The next day, the match officials from Nepal died on the way home after the match in the PIA Flight 268 crash. Wohaib faced Brothers Union from Bangladesh in the next round; the match held on 10 October 1992 at the Mirpur Stadium in Dhaka ended in a goalless draw. The return leg on 17 October at the Railway Stadium in Lahore ended in a 2–0 victory for Wohaib. Muhammad Nauman Khan and substitute Saleem Patni scored the decisive goals at the 83rd and 90th minute respectively, sealing the historic qualification. This was a time when Pakistan's domestic competitions were largely dominated by the departmental teams, yet many of them struggled to deliver strong performances in Asian competitions. Some even chose not to participate due to the additional costs involved.

The borrowed players returned to their respective departments before the start of the 1992–1993 National Football Championship, held in several venues at Rawalpindi, Karachi and Lahore from 20 October 1992 to 14 February 1993 and where the club managed to finish sixth out of nine teams under the coaching of Salman's sibling Hafiz Sohaib Butt and the captainship of defender Aamir Mahmood. Tariq Lutfi however returned as head of the team for the group stage at the Asian top flight in Bahrain. After a humiliating defeat by 10–0 to Al-Wasl in the opening fixture on 15 January 1993, they came back and drew 1–1 with the eventual champions of the competition PAS Tehran in their final group game on 17 January, with Tanveer ul Hasnain scoring the lone goal. For their efforts, Wohaib FC was ranked 5th place in Asian Club Championship that year.

==== 1993–99 ====
At the 1993–1994 National Football Championship played at Quetta, Lahore, Faisalabad, Rawalpindi, Peshawar and Karachi from 17 August 1993 to 9 February 1994, the club again finished sixth, this time with 15 points. At the next 1994 National Football Championship played at the Tehmas Khan Stadium, Peshawar in a single year from 16 April till 2 May 1994, the club finished seventh securing five points in the single leg format.

Later on, Hafiz Salman's sacking from the Pakistan Football Federation affected the club as departmental clubs took away their best talent and the ones that stayed behind were not given the chances they deserved for selection in national team for the upcoming years.

The team later participated in minor competitions, winning the city based 1998 Lahore League, played in September 1998 at Railway Stadium.

=== Pakistan Premier League era (2004–2008) ===
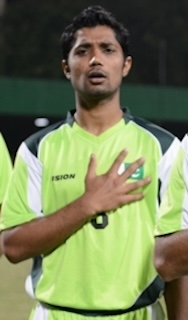
Muhammad Ahmed played for Wohaib from 2003 till 2008

Wohaib became one of the founding members of the Pakistan Premier League in the inaugural 2004–05 season after topping the Punjab Inter-District Club Football Tournament. This time however as was the case of all of the private owned clubs of Pakistan, the team was severely strapped for cash and barely surviving a season, contrasting with the departmental teams who continued to dominate the domestic structure of Pakistan. The club also continued to use its youth system that continued to provide players for Pakistani youth teams at various age groups as well winning many national youth competitions in the past. Notable players produced by the club during this period became goalkeeper Bilal Rafiq, forward Rizwan Asif, and eventual international captain Muhammad Ahmed.

The team finished in the 10th position out of 16 teams accumulating 30 points. On 12 June 2004 during a match against WAPDA at the Punjab Stadium, national football referee Essa Khan and manager of Wohaib Tanvir Zia Butt had an altercation and beat up referee Dil Nawaz minutes before the start of the match. The incident occurred after Wohaib chairman Hafiz Salman Butt abused Dil Nawaz and later beat him up. When Dil Nawaz tried to escape, both Essa and Tanvir caught up with him at the main gate and started beating him. The two were eventually suspended by the Pakistan Football Federation for indiscipline.

The next season, the club survived relegation finishing tenth out of 12 teams, with only one goal difference ahead of Panther FC, where both earned 20 points. The club also a heavy 10–0 defeat against the eventual champions Pakistan Army. The team also participated in the 2005 National Football Challenge Cup, failing to pass through the group stage.

In the 2006–07 season, Wohaib again narrowly missed out on being relegated after finishing just one point above the relegated Habib Bank.

=== Downfall (2007–present) ===
In the 2007–08 season, the club was relegated after losing 8 players to other clubs and internal destabilisation. The football club stirred controversy after inaccurately registering the Nigerian player Akeem Abbas Olajuwon, neglecting to secure the necessary No Objection Certificate. The player received minimal compensation from Wohaib and became stuck in the country as a result, ultimately resulting in his visa overstay for months. Stranded without support from the federation and the club itself, Akeem found assistance from former referee Ahmed Jan, who offered him shelter and covered the expenses for his flight back home.

In their first season at the second tier in the 2008–09 PFF League, the team reached the semifinals until failing to show up against Baloch Nushki. In 2008, the team won the Lahore League after winning in the final against City FC Lahore.

After two more unsuccessful seasons, Wohaib was again promoted to the top tier after finishing runner-ups at the 2011 PFF League under the captaincy of Fouad Nisar and with young players such as Ahmed Faheem. The final against Zarai Taraqiati ended in a goalless draw, and the eventual 1–3 defeat in the penalty shootout.

However, the club was relegated once again at the end of the 2012–13 Pakistan Premier League after collecting only eight points. The team already having secured the relegation, also missed some last matches against Muslim Chaman and Baloch Nushki by walkover.

After a long period of inactivity due to the lack of football activities within Pakistan at both international and domestic level due to the internal crisis within the Pakistan Football Federation coupled by several FIFA bans, the team participated in the 2020 PFF League, failing to advance from the group stage. It also participated at the 2020 PFF National Challenge Cup. These were the lone domestic competitions held during the year, until the PFF received another ban and consequent disruption of the domestic structure followed.

== Club crest and kits ==
The traditional kit of Wohaib is white with green edges in the shoulders and arms, along with white shorts and socks. Between 1991 and 1994, the team kit also usually featured green as the primary colour with white edges. The secondary kit was usually red with white edges. The Pakistan national football team also featured a nearly identical design as the Wohaib kit in 1992 and 1993, coinciding with Wohaib club chairman Hafiz Salman Butt's tenure as general secretary of the Pakistan Football Federation.

== Stadium ==
Wohaib Club's home ground is Punjab University Old Campus Ground situated at Lake Road near Chauburji in Lahore. It was one of the venues considered by the Pakistan Football Federation to host the 2007 AFC President's Cup.

== Rivalries ==
Wohaib had a rivalry with Faisalabad club Panther FC during the 2005–06 season when both teams were fighting for relegation. In October 2005, match referee Abdul Jabbar was manhandled by angered Wohaib club players after he gave a goal to Panthers Club in the 87th minute. Under pressure, the referee reversed the decision and disallowed the goal but was beaten again by spectators. The first leg of the season saw Wohaib winning by 3–1. On 19 October 2005, Panther recorded a crucial win against Wohaib in the relegation battle by a lone goal.

== Competitive record ==
Season	Division	League								National Challenge Cup	Asian club competition	
Season	Division	P	W	D	L	GF	GA	Pts	Pos.	National Challenge Cup	Asian club competition	
1992–93	National A-Division Football Championship	16	5	4	7	16	18	14	6th	DNE	Asian Club Championship	Group stage
1993–94	National A-Division Football Championship	21	4	7	10	14	27	15	6th	DNE	DNQ	
1994	National A-Division Football Championship	7	2	1	4	7	13	5	7th	DNE	DNQ	
2004–05	Pakistan Premier League	30	9	3	18	37	53	30	10th	DNE	DNQ	
2005–06	Pakistan Premier League	22	5	5	12	16	41	20	10th	Group stage	DNQ	
2006–07	Pakistan Premier League	20	3	4	13	10	33	13	10th	DNE	DNQ	
2007–08	Pakistan Premier League	26	1	5	20	11	60	8	14th	DNE	DNQ	
2008–09	PFF League	3	2	0	1	6	5	4	Semi-finals	DNE	DNQ	
2009–10	PFF League	–	–	–	–	–	–	–	Semi-finals	DNE	DNQ	
2010–11	PFF League	4	2	2	0	3	1	8	Final group stage	DNE	DNQ	
2011–12	PFF League	7	4	1	2	15	6	13	2nd	DNE	DNQ	
2012–13	Pakistan Premier League	30	1	5	24	8	75	8	16th	DNE	DNQ	
2013–14	PFF League	2	1	0	1	1	1	3	Group stage	DNE	DNQ	
2014–15	PFF League	DNE								DNE	DNQ	
2020–21	PFF League	5	1	0	4	2	11	3	Group stage	Group stage	DNQ	

Key

Winners
Runners-up
3rd place
Relegated

- Pld = Played
- W = Games won
- D = Games drawn
- L = Games lost
- GF = Goals for
- GA = Goals against
- Pts = Points
- Pos. = Final position
- DNQ = Did not qualify
- DNE = Did not enter
- NH = Not held
- – = Did not exist/Unknown

== Performance in AFC competitions ==
Win Draw Loss

Season	Competition	Round	Club	First leg	Second leg	Aggregate
1992–93	Asian Club Championship	Qualifying Playoff round	(Maldives) Club Valencia	1–2	6–2	7–4
1992–93	Asian Club Championship	Qualifying Playoff round	(Bangladesh) Brothers Union	0–0	2–0	2–0
1992–93	Asian Club Championship	Group stage	(United Arab Emirates) Al-Wasl	0–10		
1992–93	Asian Club Championship	Group stage	(Iran) PAS Tehran	1–1		

== Honours ==
League

- PFF League
  - Runners-up: 2011
