= 2005–06 PFF League =

PFF League
- Season: 2nd
- Dates: 28 December 2005 – 4 February 2006
- Champions: Pakistan Railways
- Promoted: Pakistan Railways; K-Electric

The 2005–06 PFF League was the 2nd season of Pakistan Football Federation League, second tier of Pakistan Football Federation. The season started on 28 December 2005 and concluded on 4 February 2006.

== Groups ==
=== Group A ===
Pos	Team	Pld	W	D	L	GF	GA	GD	Pts
1	K-Electric	6	4	2	0	14	2	+12	10
2	Sindh Government Press	6	3	1	2	16	7	+9	7
3	Mauripur Baloch	6	2	1	3	4	13	-9	5
4	Sui Southern Gas	6	0	2	4	5	17	-12	2

28 December 2005

K-Electric	4–0	Mauripur Baloch
Aftab (4'); Musa (32', 47); Aurangzeb (36')	Report

28 December 2005

Sindh Government Press	7–1	Sui Southern Gas Company
Zahid Ahmad (13', 45', 62'); Amir Shaukat (35'); Farhan (66', 69'); Manzoor Ali (75')	Report	Zeeshan (55')

30 December 2005

Sindh Government Press	2–0	Mauripur Baloch
Farhan Abdul Qadir (9'); Akhtar Ali (77')	Report

1 January 2006

Sindh Government Press	1–1	K-Electric
	Report

1 January 2006

Sui Southern Gas Company	1–1	Mauripur Baloch
	Report

3 January 2006

K-Electric	5–0	Mauripur Baloch
Shakir (8'); Javaid (16'); Musa (41'); Sohail (55', 69')	Report

3 January 2006

Sindh Government Press	5–2	Sui Southern Gas Company
Zahid Ahmad (10', 51'); Amir Shaukat (55'); Akhtar Ali (74'); Farhan (85')	Report	Shahnawaz (58', 83' p)

3 January 2006

K-Electric	5–0	Mauripur Baloch
Shakir (8'); Javaid (16'); Musa (41'); Sohail (55', 69')	Report

5 January 2006

Sindh Government Press	1–2	Mauripur Baloch
Akhtar Ali (86')	Report	Mehboob (56'); Khalid Iqbal (88')

5 January 2006

K-Electric	0–0	Sui Southern Gas Company
	Report

7 January 2006

K-Electric	1–0	Sindh Government Press
Aurangzeb (66')	Report

9 January 2006

Sindh Government Press	1–3	K-Electric
Arif (17')	Report	Musa (49'); Javaid (50'); Aurangzeb (90')

15 January 2006

Mauripur Baloch	1–0	Sui Southern Gas Company
Abdul Wahid (18')	Report

=== Group B ===
Pos	Team	Pld	W	D	L	GF	GA	GD	Pts
1	Pakistan Police	2	1	1	0	1	0	+1	3
2	Baloch Quetta	2	0	1	0	0	0	-1	1

Pakistan Police	1–0	Baloch Quetta
	Report

Baloch Quetta	0–0	Pakistan Police
	Report

=== Group C ===
Pos	Team	Pld	W	D	L	GF	GA	GD	Pts
1	Pakistan Railways	3	1	2	0	4	2	+2	4
2	Pakistan Ordnance Factories	4	0	4	0	2	2	0	4
3	Pakistan Television	3	0	2	1	2	4	-2	2

22 December 2005

Pakistan Railways	3–1	Pakistan Television
Nasir (5'); Zaheer Abbas (50', 87')	Report	Akhtar Ali (85)

24 December 2005

Pakistan Railways	1–1	Pakistan Ordnance Factories
Zaheer Abbas (69')	Report	Naeem Butt (40') p

27 December 2005

Pakistan Ordnance Factories	0–0	Pakistan Television
	Report

29 December 2005

Pakistan Television	1–1	Pakistan Ordnance Factories
Nasir (70')	Report	Lakhmir (26')

31 December 2005

Pakistan Television	1–0	Pakistan Railways
	PTV lost due to placing illegible player

3 January 2006

Pakistan Railways	0–0	Pakistan Ordnance Factories
	Report

=== Group D ===
Pos	Team	Pld	W	D	L	GF	GA	GD	Pts
1	Pakistan Air Force	2	1	1	0	4	3	+1	3
2	Dera Eleven	2	0	1	1	3	4	-1	1
3	Mardan FC (W)								

27 December 2005

Pakistan Air Force	3–2	Dera Eleven
Arshad Jan (51'); Ibrar (80'); Sabih (89')	Report	Muhammad Faheem (32', 71')

16 January 2006

Dera Eleven	1–1	Pakistan Air Force
Muhammad Ali (57')	Report	Arshad Jan (66')

=== Final round ===
==== Group 1 ====
Pos	Team	Pld	W	D	L	GF	GA	GD	Pts
1	K-Electric	3	3	0	0	10	2	+8	6
2	Sindh Government Press	3	2	0	1	3	5	-2	5
3	Baloch Quetta	3	1	0	2	2	5	-3	2
4	Pakistan Police	3	0	0	3	2	5	-3	0

17 January 2006

K-Electric	3–0	Baloch Quetta
Shakir Lashari (26'); Aurangzeb (42'); Ahmad 63')	Report

20 January 2006

Pakistan Police	0–1	Baloch Quetta
	Report	Sarfraz Ahmad (85')

21 January 2006

K-Electric	4–0	Sindh Government Press
Ghafoor (26'); Javaid (54', 83'); Shakir Lashari (85')	Report

22 January 2006

Sindh Government Press	1–0	Pakistan Police
Farhan Abdul Qadir (42')	Report

23 January 2006

Sindh Government Press	2–1	Baloch Quetta
Muhammad Baksh (27'); Muhammad Ilyas (45')	Report	Muhammad Noor (35')

24 January 2006

K-Electric	3–2	Pakistan Police
Ghafoor (29', 72'); Sohail (77')	Report	Habibullah (18'); Muhammad Iqbal (42')

==== Group 2 ====
Pos	Team	Pld	W	D	L	GF	GA	GD	Pts
1	Pakistan Railways	3	2	0	1	11	4	+7	4
2	Pakistan Air Force	3	1	1	1	3	3	0	3
3	Dera Eleven	3	1	1	1	1	6	-5	3
4	Pakistan Ordnance Factories	3	1	0	2	2	4	-2	2

23 January 2006

Pakistan Railways	6–0	Dera Eleven
Zaheer Abbas (10', 12', 40', 76', 85'); Asif (47')	Report

24 January 2006

Pakistan Ordnance Factories	1–0	Pakistan Air Force
Manzoor Shah (73')	Report

26 January 2006

Pakistan Air Force	0–0	Dera Eleven
	Report

27 January 2006

Pakistan Railways	3–1	Pakistan Ordnance Factories
	Report

29 January 2006

Dera Eleven	1–0	Pakistan Ordnance Factories
Muhammad Kamran	Report

30 January 2006

Pakistan Air Force	3–2	Pakistan Railways
Saleh (11'); Ilyas (88'); Iqbal (90'p)	Report	Asif Hameed (52'); Zaheer Abbas

== Semi-finals ==
1 February 2006

K-Electric	4–1	Pakistan Air Force
Musa (30', 85'); Shakir Lashari (33'); Aurangzeb (47')	Report	Arshad (72')

2 February 2006

Pakistan Railways	2–0	Sindh Government Press
Nasir Khan (27'); Zaheer (48')	Report

== Third-Place ==
3 February 2006

Pakistan Air Force	0–0	Sindh Government Press
	Report
Penalties
	3-4

== Final ==
4 February 2006

Pakistan Railways	1–0	K-Electric
Saeed Qureshi (48')	Report
