= Baloch FC (Quetta) =

Pakistani football club

- Full name: Baloch Football Club Quetta
- Short name: BQFC
- Ground: Sadiq Shaheed Stadium
- Capacity: 5,000
- Manager: Abdul Waheed
- League: Pakistan Premier League

Baloch Football Club is a football club based in Quetta, Pakistan. It last competed in the Pakistan Premier League, after gaining promotion from the 2020 PFF League.

== History ==
In 2004, Baloch FC Quetta became one of the founding members of the Pakistan Premier League after qualified via district tournaments. The club was relegated at the end of the season after finishing 14th in the table.

In the 2005–06 PFF National League, Baloch Quetta made its PFF debut against Pakistan Police which they lost.

In the 2009–10 PFF League, Baloch Quetta qualified for the semi-finals. They defeated Muslim FC in the semi-final but lost to Young Blood in the final.

In the 2013 PFF League, Baloch Quetta were promoted to the Pakistan Premier League for the first time. They made their PPL debut in the 2014–15 Pakistan Premier League. However, they won no match and were relegated to the next PFF League.

The next PFF League was held in 2020 where Baloch Quetta won the final and were promoted to the 2021 Pakistan Premier League, but later withdrew.

== Stadium ==
Like several Pakistan domestic football teams, Baloch Quetta does not own a dedicated ground. Hence the team used several municipal venues in Quetta for its home fixtures. The club usually have used the Sadiq Shaheed Stadium for its home fixtures for the Pakistan Premier League.

== Rivalries ==
Baloch FC Quetta and Muslim FC of Chaman contest the Quetta–Chaman rivalry, which is regarded as one of the most prominent fixtures in Balochistan football and is often framed as a contest for provincial supremacy.

== Players ==
=== Current squad ===
As of 1 August 2023

Note: Flags indicate national team as defined under FIFA eligibility rules; some limited exceptions apply. Players may hold more than one non-FIFA nationality.

No.	Pos.	Nation	Player
—	GK	PAK	Mohammad Bilal
—	GK	PAK	Javed Akhtar
—	DF	PAK	Bilal Akhtar
—	DF	PAK	Noor Mohammad
—	DF	PAK	Aman Ullah
—	DF	PAK	Juma Khan
—	DF	PAK	Muhid Ullah
—	DF	PAK	Saif Ullah
—	MF	PAK	Nizam Uddin
—	MF	PAK	Zahid
—	MF	PAK	Azmat Shah

No.	Pos.	Nation	Player
—	MF	PAK	Zaheer Shah
—	FW	PAK	Riaz Ahmed
—	FW	PAK	Zohaib Ayoub
—	FW	PAK	Muhammad Shahid
—	FW	PAK	Kabir Ahmed
—	FW	PAK	Naseeb Ullah
—	FW	PAK	Mohammad Goram
—	FW	PAK	Ameer Jan

== Personnel ==
=== Current technical staff ===
As of August 2023

Position	Name
Assistant Coach	(Pakistan) Abdul Waheed
Goalkeeper Coach	(Pakistan) Aziz

== Competitive record ==
The club's competitive records since the 2004–05 season are listed below.

Season	Div	Tms	Pos	National Challenge Cup	AFC President's Cup	AFC Cup
2004–05	Pakistan Premier League	16	14	DNP	DNP	DNP
2005–06	PFF League	12	Final group stage	Group stage	DNP	DNP
2006–07	PFF League	8	Group stage	DNP	DNP	DNP
2007–08	PFF League	14	Group stage	DNP	DNP	DNP
2009–10	PFF League	18	2	DNP	DNP	DNP
2010–11	PFF League	16	Group stage	DNP	DNP	DNP
2011–12	PFF League	17	Final group stage	DNP	DNP	DNP
2012–13	PFF League	20	Final group stage	DNP	DNP	DNP
2013–14	PFF League	24	2	DNP	DNP	DNP
2014–15	Pakistan Premier League	12	12	DNP	DNP	DNP
2020–21	PFF League	19	1	Group stage	DNP	DNP

== Honours ==
- PFF League
  - Champions (1): 2020
