= Mardan FC =

Pakistani football club

- Full name: Mardan Football Club
- Short name: MAR

Mardan Football Club is a Pakistani football club based in Mardan, Khyber Pakhtunkhwa. The club is one of the founder members of the Pakistan Premier League, and played at the top tier in 2004. The club also have a female team.

== History ==
The club participated in the All-NWFP Football Tournament played at Sheikh Farooq Stadium, Peshawar in 2003. The club lost in the quarterfinals against National Aryana.

In 2004, Mardan FC became one of the founding members of the Pakistan Premier League, qualifying by winning all three matches in the provincial qualifying group. It was one of the few local clubs of Pakistan to appear in Pakistan Premier League, in a tournament dominated by departmental teams during that time. It made its professional debut in the inaugural 2004 National League. The club finished last with 10 points, hence becoming relegated. The team also participated in the 2005 National Challenge Cup, the top tier national cup competition.

The next season, the team withdrew from the second tier 2005–06 PFF League.

In March 2006, the club was suspended by the Pakistan Football Federation due to fielding an overage player at the National U-21 Championship.

In 2016, the club participated in the District Inter-Club Football Tournament being played at Younis Stadium in Mardan, registering a 7–6 victory against Young United in the semifinal.

In 2019, Mardan FC clinched the title after defeating Rashakai Club 1–0 in the final of the Ramazan Games Floodlight Football played at Mardan Sports Complex.
