= PFF League =

Association football league in Pakistan

- Organising body: Pakistan Football Federation
- Founded: 2004; 22 years ago
- Folded: 2020; 6 years ago
- Country: Pakistan
- Confederation: AFC
- Level on pyramid: 2 (2004–2020)
- Promotion to: Pakistan Premier League
- Domestic cup: PFF National Challenge Cup
- Last champions: Baloch Quetta (club phase); Masha United (departmental phase) (2020)
- Most championships: Pakistan Railways (2 titles)

The Pakistan Football Federation League B Division (Urdu: پاکستان فٹ بال فیڈریشن لیگ) commonly known and abbreviated as PFF League, was the second tier of the Pakistani football league system from 2004 to 2020. It operated on a system of promotion and relegation with the Pakistan Premier League. The league was held regularly from 2004 until 2014, when a crisis within the Pakistan Football Federation led to the suspension of domestic football competitions. After a long hiatus, the league returned for the 2020 season.

Each season, the two top-finishing teams from the PFFL's club phase and the departmental phase were automatically promoted to the Pakistan Premier League, and the winner of the final between club phase and departmental phase was crowned the PFF League champion.

== History ==
The PFF League was founded in 2004 to serve as the second division for the newly re-branded Pakistan Premier League. The league's name was originally planned as 'National League Division B', however it was ultimately branded as PFF League since its formation.

Its inaugural season was won by National Bank and Pakistan Public Works Department were the runners-up. Baloch Quetta is the team that has spent the most time in the PFF League, a total of nine seasons.

In 2006, the Pakistan Football Federation introduced the National Club Championship as a third tier beneath the PFF League, although it is unknown whether it was held again as a third-tier competition.

In February 2020, after six years, Pakistan Football Federation announced the 2020 edition of the PFF League to be held across 4 cities (Quetta, Faisalabad, Karachi, and Lahore).

== Structure of the league ==
The league comprised more than 10 teams with club teams playing in the club leg while the departmental clubs played through department phase group stages. Winner from both the phases earned promotion to upcoming season of Pakistan Premier League and face each other in the finals to determine the winner of PFF League.

== Results ==
=== Champions and runners-up ===
Season	Champions	Score	Runner-up
2004–05	National Bank	1–1 (Note: National Bank declared winners on league position.)	Pakistan Public Works Department
2005–06	Pakistan Railways	1–0	K-Electric
2006	Pakistan Television	4–0	PMC Athletico Faisalabad
2007–08	Pak Elektron	1–1 (Note: Pak Elektron declared winners on league position.)	Pakistan Steel
2008–09	Baloch Nushki	1–0	Pakistan Air Force
2009–10	Sui Southern Gas	1–0	Young Blood
2010	Pakistan Police	2–1	Muslim
2011	Zarai Taraqiati	3–1	Wohaib
2012	Pak Afghan Clearing	0–0 (4–3p)	Lyallpur
2013	Pakistan Railways	2–0	Baloch Quetta
2014	Pakistan Navy	1–0	Baloch Nushki
Qualified
2020	Baloch Quetta, Masha United, Karachi United, Gwadar Port Authority		

=== Relegated teams (from PPL to PFFL) ===
Season	Clubs
2004	Allied Bank (48) (Note: Originally, Panther Club finished in the relegation zone 12th and Allied Bank finished 8th, four places above relegation, but Allied Bank were to be dissolved after the end of the season therefore they got relegated in place of Panther Club as Panther were the best placed team in the relegation zone.), Young Eleven FC (25), Mauripur Baloch (22), Baloch Quetta (20), Naka Muhammaden (15), Mardan (10)
2005	Panther Club (20), Pakistan Public Works Department (12)
2006–07	Habib Bank (12) (Note: The Pakistan Football Federation expanded the 2007–08 Pakistan Premier League from 14 to 16 teams, therefore Habib Bank was saved from relegation, even though they finished in the relegation zone), Pakistan Telecommunication (0) (Note: PTCL was dissolved by the parent organisation PTCL, therefore they got relegated without playing a game.)
2007–08	Pakistan Railways (19), Wohaib (8)
2008	Pakistan Steel (26), Pakistan Television (5)
2009	PMC Athletico (21), Baloch Nushki (8)
2010	Sui Southern Gas (20), Young Blood (18)
2011	Pakistan Police (24), Pak Elektron (8)
2012–13	PMC Athletico (25), Wohaib (8)
2013–14	Habib Bank (35), Pakistan Navy (35), Lyallpur (26), Pak Afghan Clearing (24), Baloch Nushki (20), Zarai Tarqiati (17)
2014–15	Pakistan Railways (10), Baloch Quetta (4)
2018–19	Karachi Port Trust (18), Baloch Nushki (6), Ashraf Sugar Mills (0) (Note: Ashraf Sugar Mills withdrew from league after playing 10 games, therefore all of their matches results were annulled and got relegated.), Pakistan Airlines (0) (Note: Pakistan Airlines withdrew from league and got relegated.)
