= Sindh Government Press FC =

Pakistani football club

Sindh Government Press
- Full name: Sindh Government Press
- Short name: SGPFC

Sindh Government Press Football Club is a departmental team based in Karachi, Pakistan.

== History ==
The team first competed as West Pakistan Government Press. In 1959, the team played at the All-Pakistan President's Cup, with players such as Abdul Ghafoor and Abdullah Rahi. In 1962 the team featured in the Karachi Football League.

The team was later being renamed as Sindh Government Press in the 1970s following the independence of Bangladesh.

Sindh Government Press won the inaugural 1979 Inter-Departmental Championship after defeating Muslim Commercial Bank, under the captainship of Ghulam Haider. Consequently, the Pakistan Football Federation organised a tour to Nepal for the team. During the tour, Sindh Government Press recorded a 2–3 defeat against Nepal, 1–1 draw against Nepal Police, and 3–2 victory against Kathmandu Combined.

Under the tenure as manager of former captain Ghulam Haider, Sindh Government Press enjoyed brief domestic success from 1989 to 1992. In the 1989 National Football Championship, they were runners-up to Pakistan Airlines. During the period, the team also won the Lifebuoy Champions Trophy, Habib Bank Gold Cup, and Police Gold Cup. On 18 March 1992, Sindh Government Press won the Niaz Memorial Football Tournament after defeating Karachi by a lone goal.

In the 2004–05 PFF National League, SGP was in Southern Group. They ended up in the fourth place out of seven team. In the 2005–06 PFF National League, SGP were placed second in Group A . They reached the semi-finals, where the loss against Pakistan Railways also ended their promotion chance. They have played more than five editions of PFF League but still have not been promoted to Pakistan Premier League. In 2020, they played PFF League after six years, but still could not win promotion.

== Honours ==
- Inter-Departmental Championship
  - Winners (1): 1979
