= List of Pakistan national football team managers =

This article lists the Pakistan national football team managers/head coaches, since the team's international debut in 1950.

== Overview ==
Under Shahjahan as coach, Pakistan won their first ever title at the 1952 Asian Quadrangular Tournament, where they ended joint-winner with India. On 10 October 1957, Pakistan first foreign head coach John McBride was signed on a two-year contract.

Chinese head coach Wang Xiao He led the national side to clinch the gold medal at the 1989 South Asian Games. At the subsequent 1991 South Asian Games under the tenure of Muhammad Aslam Japani, Pakistan again retained the gold.

== List of managers ==
Managers in italics took charge as caretaker or interim manager

- (Pakistan) Khawaja Riaz Ahmed (1950)
- (Pakistan) Mohammad Shahjahan (1952)
- (Pakistan) Syed Rahman (1953)
- (Pakistan) Khawaja Riaz Ahmed (1954)
- (Pakistan) Abdul Wahid Durrani (1955)
- (Pakistan) Sq. Ldr. M.M. Said (1956)
- (Scotland) John McBride (1957–1959)
- (Pakistan) Saeed Mirza (1959)
- (Pakistan) Sheikh Shaheb Ali (1960–1961)
- (England) George Ainsley (1962)
- (Pakistan) Sheikh Shaheb Ali (1963)
- (Pakistan) Fl. Lt. Atiq Ahmad (1964–1965)
- (Pakistan) Afzal Khan (1966–1967)
- (Pakistan) Muhammad Amin (1967–1973)
- (Pakistan) Afzal Khan (1969)
- (India) Mohammed Rahmatullah (1969)
- (India) Mohammed Rahmatullah (1974)
- (Hungary) Géza Kalocsay (1976)
- (Pakistan) Masood ul Hassan Butt (1978)
- (Pakistan) Younus Rana (1981–1983)
- (Poland) Zbigniew Szumski (1984–1985)
- (Pakistan) Tariq Lutfi (1985–1986)
- (Pakistan) Younus Changezi (1986)
- (Pakistan) Younus Rana (1987)
- (West Germany) Burkhard Ziese (1987–1989)
- (Pakistan) Tariq Lutfi (1989)
- (China) Wang Xiao He (1989–1990)
- (Pakistan) Muhammad Aslam Japani (1991–1993)
- (Pakistan) Tariq Lutfi (1995)
- (Pakistan) Muhammad Idrees (1996–1999)
- (Brazil) Pedro Dias (1999)
- (England) David Burns (2000–2001)
- (England) John Layton (2001–2002)
- (Slovakia) Jozef Herel (2002–2003)
- (Pakistan) Tariq Lutfi (2003–2005)
- (Bahrain) Salman Sharida (2005–2007)
- (Pakistan) Akhtar Mohiuddin (2007–2008)
- (Pakistan) Shahzad Anwar (2008)
- (Austria) György Kottán (2009–2010)
- (Pakistan) Tariq Lutfi (2011)
- (Serbia) Zaviša Milosavljević (2011–2013)
- (Pakistan) Shahzad Anwar (2013)
- (Bahrain) Mohammad Al-Shamlan (2013–2015)
- (Brazil) José Antonio Nogueira (2018–2019)
- (Pakistan) Tariq Lutfi (2019)
- (Pakistan) Shahzad Anwar (2022–2023)
- (England) Stephen Constantine (2023–2025)
- (Peru) Nolberto Solano (2025–)

== Managerial records ==
As of 10 June 2025

- Only senior FIFA A matches considered.
- List also includes managers who took charge of the national team in senior unofficial matches.
- "Period" indicates the timespan of the first and last matches in charge, which may include periods not in charge of the national team
- Since 1978

Manager	Period	P	W	D	L	GF	GA	%W	Major Tournament(s)
(Pakistan) Masood ul Hassan Butt	1978	2	0	0	2	3	14	0.00	—
(Pakistan) Younus Rana	1981–1983	8	4	2	2	8	5	50.00	—
(Poland) Zbigniew Szumski	1984–1985	6	2	0	4	6	17	33.33	—
(Pakistan) Tariq Lutfi	1985–1986	11	3	0	8	14	24	27.27	1985 South Asian Games fourth place 1986 Asian Games group stage
(Pakistan) Younus Changezi	1986	1	0	0	1	0	1	0.00	—
(Pakistan) Younus Rana	1987	2	0	1	1	2	3	0.00	—
(Germany) Burkhard Ziese	1987–1989	10	2	1	7	3	20	20.00	1987 South Asian Games third place
(Pakistan) Tariq Lutfi	1989	1	0	0	1	1	4	0.00	—
(China) Wang Xiao He	1989–1990	6	2	1	3	4	16	33.33	1989 South Asian Games champions 1990 Asian Games group stage
(Pakistan) Muhammad Aslam Japani	1991–1993	21	2	4	15	10	66	9.52	1991 South Asian Games champions 1993 SAARC Gold Cup group stage 1993 South Asian Games group stage
(Pakistan) Tariq Lutfi	1995	2	1	0	1	1	2	50.00	1995 SAARC Gold Cup group stage
(Pakistan) Muhammad Idrees	1996–1999	12	2	0	10	6	33	16.67	1997 SAFF Gold Cup third place 1999 SAFF Gold Cup group stage
(Brazil) Pedro Dias	1999	3	1	0	2	5	15	33.33	1999 South Asian Games group stage
(England) David Burns	2000	4	0	0	4	0	16	0.00	—
(England) John Layton	2001	6	0	1	5	5	29	0.00	—
(Slovakia) Jozef Herel	2002	4	0	2	2	2	4	0.00	—
(Pakistan) Tariq Lutfi	2003–2005	13	5	1	7	12	16	38.46	2003 SAFF Gold Cup fourth place
(Bahrain) Salman Sharida	2005–2006	16	3	3	10	9	31	18.75	2005 SAFF Gold Cup semi-finals 2006 AFC Challenge Cup group stage
(Pakistan) Akhtar Mohiuddin	2007–2008	10	3	1	6	17	28	30.00	2008 SAFF Championship group stage
(Pakistan) Shahzad Anwar	2008	1	0	0	1	1	4	0.00	—
(Austria) György Kottán	2009	7	2	3	2	16	8	28.57	2009 SAFF Championship group stage
(Pakistan) Tariq Lutfi	2011	5	1	1	3	3	9	20.00	—
(Serbia) Zaviša Milosavljević	2011–2013	12	3	4	5	6	14	25.00	2011 SAFF Championship group stage
(Pakistan) Shahzad Anwar	2013	3	1	1	1	3	3	33.33	2013 SAFF Championship group stage
(Bahrain) Mohammad Al-Shamlan	2013–2015	8	2	1	5	6	16	25.00	—
(Brazil) José Antonio Nogueira	2018–2019	8	2	0	6	8	13	25.00	2018 SAFF Championship semi-finals
(Pakistan) Shahzad Anwar	2022–2023	8	0	0	8	1	15	0.00	2023 SAFF Championship group stage
(England) Stephen Constantine	2023–2025	10	1	1	8	2	29	10.00	—

== See also ==
- Pakistan national football team results
