= Tariq Lutfi =

Pakistani footballer and manager

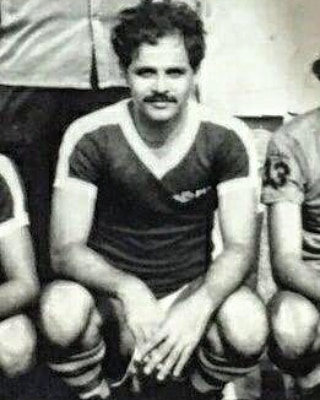
- Lutfi as player of Pakistan Airlines in 1976

Personal information
- Full name: Umar Farooq Tariq Lutfi
- Date of birth: 20 September 1951 (age 75)
- Place of birth: Karachi, Pakistan
- Position: Midfielder

Senior career*
Years	Team	Apps	(Gls)
1976–1985	Pakistan Airlines		

Managerial career
- 1985–1986: Pakistan
- 1989: Pakistan (caretaker)
- 1992–1993: Wohaib
- 1995: Pakistan
- 2003–2005: Pakistan
- 2010: Pakistan women
- 2011: Pakistan
- 2011: Pakistan U23
- 2011–2015: Khan Research Laboratories
- 2017–2019: Sui Southern Gas
- 2019: Pakistan
- * Club domestic league appearances and goals

Umar Farooq Tariq Lutfi (born 20 September 1951) is a Pakistani football coach and former midfielder. Lutfi has the distinction of being the first-ever FIFA Coaching Instructor from South Asia, and has been described as one of the most experienced football coaches from Pakistan.

Lutfi played for Pakistan Airlines from 1976 till 1985 and won the National Football Championship thrice with the team. After stepping down from playing, he managed the Pakistan national team several times from 1985 to 2005. At club level he managed his former club Pakistan Airlines, Wohaib, Khan Research Laboratories, and Sui Southern Gas. He is also a former head coach of the Pakistan women's national football team.

== Playing career ==
Lutfi joined Pakistan Airlines as player on 15 March 1976. He played for the team till 1985, winning the National Football Championship with the team several times in 1976, 1978, and 1981.

== Coaching career ==
=== Pakistan national team ===
Lutfi took over charge of the national men’s team for the first time at the 1985 South Asian Games in Dhaka. The next year he led the team at the 1986 Quaid-e-Azam International Tournament and the 1986 Asian Games.

In 1989, he replaced Burkhard Ziese as caretaker manager two days before facing the United Arab Emirates at the second leg of the 1990 FIFA World Cup qualification in February 1989. He was also member of the coaching staff as assistant coach under Muhammad Aslam Japani during the 1991 South Asian Games when Pakistan won the gold medal.

=== Wohaib ===
Lutfi was made coach of Lahore based club Wohaib which participated in the 1992–93 Asian Club Championship. He led the team to earn victories over clubs from Club Valencia from Maldives and Brothers Union from Bangladesh to qualify for Group B, becoming the first Pakistani club to pass the qualifying round of the Asian Club Championship.

After the start of the 1992–1993 National Football Championship, held from 20 October 1992 to 14 February 1993, Hafiz Sohaib Butt became the club coach, however Lutfi returned as head of the team for the group stage at the Asian top flight. After a humiliating defeat by 10–0 to Al-Wasl in the opening fixture, the club came back and drew 1–1 with the eventual champions of the competition PAS Tehran in their final group game in Bahrain. For their efforts, Wohaib FC was ranked 5th place in Asian Club Championship that year.

=== Return to Pakistan national team ===
In 1995, he assumed the charge for the 1995 South Asian Gold Cup in Colombo.

He again coached the team from 2003 till 2005, leading in a three match friendly series in the last year against India until eventually being replaced by Salman Sharida. During the 2004 South Asian Games, Lutfi served as assistant coach of the Pakistan under-23 team under Wang Xiao He when Pakistan again won the gold.

=== Pakistan women football team ===
In March 2007, being the first-ever FIFA Coaching Instructor from South Asia after obtaining the A license. The same year, Lutfi briefly managed Karachi Bazigar in the Super Football League 2007 campaign.

In 2010, Lutfi was appointed coach of the Pakistan women football team, becoming the first ever in the history of the newly formed team. Tariq coached the team for the first SAFF Women Championship in Bangladesh where the team reached the semi-finals.

=== Return to Pakistan national team ===
The next year returned as caretaker coach of Pakistan national team in 2011, but was replaced by Zaviša Milosavljević. The same year, he also coached the Pakistan under-23 team for the 2012 Summer Olympic Qualifiers against Malaysia.

=== Khan Research Laboratories ===
Lutfi was appointed the head coach for Khan Research Laboratories before the start of 2011-12 Pakistan Premier League season, replacing KRL long term head coach Sajjad Mehmood. Lufti went on to win the league title for three consecutive season, winning the league in 2011-12, 2012-13, 2013-14 and finished sixth in the 2014-15 season. Lufti also won the Pakistan National Football Challenge Cup on four occasions, winning the competition in 2011 and then successfully defending it in the edition, defeating K-Electric on both occasions in the finals. He left the team in March 2015.

=== Sui Southern Gas ===
In 2017, Lutfi was appointed as the head coach for second division side Sui Southern Gas after a successful tenure with Khan Research Laboratories. Lutfi won three out four silverware they competed for after winning Major Tufail Shaheed Memorial Football Tournament, All Pakistan Salahuddin Dogar Memorial Football Tournament and winning the second division title to achieve the promotion to Pakistan Premier League.

=== Return to Pakistan ===
Following the expulsion of Faisal Saleh Hayat by FIFA, Lutfi was assigned the head coach role again in 2019, for a tour in Malaysia, until the Pakistan Football Federation was banned again briefly after.

== Honours ==
=== Player ===
==== Pakistan Airlines ====
- National Football Championship: 1976, 1978, 1981

=== Manager ===
==== Khan Research Laboratories ====
- Pakistan Premier League: 2011-12, 2012-13, 2013-14
- Pakistan National Football Challenge Cup: 2011, 2012, 2015, 2016

==== Sui Southern Gas ====
- Pakistan Football Federation League: 2017-18

==== Individual ====
- Pakistan Sports Awards: 2019

== See also ==
- List of Pakistan national football team managers
