= 1957 National Football Championship (Pakistan) =

Tournament details
- Country: Pakistan
- Venue(s): Dacca Stadium, Dacca
- Dates: 21 October 1957 – 10 November 1957

Final positions
- Champions: Punjab
- Runners-up: East Pakistan

Tournament statistics
- Top goal scorer(s): Ashraf Chowdhury (East Pakistan White) (5 goals)

The 1957 National Football Championship was the 8th edition of the National Football Championship, Pakistan's premier domestic football competition. It was played from 21 October till 10 November 1957, at the Dacca Stadium.

== Teams ==
12 teams participated in the tournament:

- Punjab
- Sindh
- Balochistan
- North-West Frontier Province
- East Pakistan Green
- East Pakistan White
- Karachi
- Bahawalpur State
- Pakistan Air Force
- Pakistan Army
- Pakistan Railways

== Overview ==
A qualifying first round was held and the winning teams would advance to the second round. Pakistan Railways, Punjab, Sindh and Balochistan didn't play the first round and each received bye to each of the four second round matches. Due to visa and passport difficulties of West Pakistani teams, the tournament was delayed twice and ultimately started in 21 October. After the finalisation of the tournament, champions Punjab also played an exhibition match against the Combined XI, comprising players of rest of the teams, ending in a 2–2 draw.

== First round ==
21 October 1957

East Pakistan Green	1–4	Pakistan Army
Rafique	Report	Abul Khair; Riaz Ahmed Qureshi; Aziz

Dacca Stadium, Dacca, East Pakistan
Referee: Mahmood Shah (Pakistan)

22 October 1957

East Pakistan White	5–2	Pakistan Navy
Ashraf; Nabi (pen.); Kabir	Report	Habib; Nazir

Dacca Stadium, Dacca, East Pakistan
Referee: Omar (Pakistan)

23 October 1957

Karachi	5–0	Pakistan Air Force
Yaqub; Ibrahim	Report

Dacca Stadium, Dacca, East Pakistan

27 October 1957

NWFP	1–0	Bahawalpur State
Sher Mohammad	Report

Dacca Stadium, Dacca, East Pakistan

=== Replay ===
29 October 1957

NWFP	1–1	Bahawalpur State
Ghulam Mustafa Jr. (og.)	Report	Mahmood Hussain

Dacca Stadium, Dacca, East Pakistan
Referee: G. Hossain (Pakistan)

=== Second replay ===
31 October 1957

NWFP	3–0	Bahawalpur State
Sher Mohammad; Sher Ahmed	Report

Dacca Stadium, Dacca, East Pakistan

== Second round ==
25 October 1957

Punjab	1–0	Pakistan Army
Mazhar	Report

Dacca Stadium, Dacca, East Pakistan
Referee: Masudur Rahman (Pakistan)

26 October 1957

Sindh	0–5	East Pakistan White
	Report	Mari; Chunna; Ashraf

Dacca Stadium, Dacca, East Pakistan

28 October 1957

Pakistan Railways	0–1	Karachi
	Report	Ibrahim

Dacca Stadium, Dacca, East Pakistan

1 November 1957

Balochistan	3–0	NWFP
Iqbal Anwar; Juma Ali	Report

Dacca Stadium, Dacca, East Pakistan

== Semi finals ==
30 October 1957

Punjab	2–1	Karachi
Safi; Hanif	Report	Yaqub

Dacca Stadium, Dacca, East Pakistan

3 November 1957

East Pakistan White	2–3	Balochistan
Kabir; Ashraf	Report	Iqbal Anwar; Taj Jr.; Juma Ali

Dacca Stadium, Dacca, East Pakistan
Attendance: 50,000
Referee: Mahmood Shah

=== Replay ===
In the semi-finals on 3 November, local fans threw stones at referee Mahmood Shah, due to his alleged controversial decisions during the match, and a brawl ensued, which resulted in seventy-seven people being injured, including fifty-four policemen. The semi-final was eventually replayed on 5 November.

5 November 1957

East Pakistan White	2–1	Balochistan
Ashraf; Kabir	Report	Qayyum

Dacca Stadium, Dacca, East Pakistan

== Final ==
The final was initially held on 8 November, but local fans packed the stadium, with some even sitting inside the playing area, causing Punjab's players to initially refuse to play. Eventually, an exhibition match was held, of 25 minutes in each half, which East Pakistan White won by 2–1.

10 November 1957

Punjab	2–1	East Pakistan White
Hanif; Mazhar	Report	Chunna

Dacca Stadium, Dacca, East Pakistan
Attendance: 40,000
Referee: M.A. Munshi (Pakistan)

=== Teams ===
- Punjab: Sharfuddin, Riasat Ali, Niamat Ullah Durrani, Muhammad Shaukat, Masood ul Hassan Butt, Muhammad Nazir, Talib Ali, Mazhar, Saif, Muhammad Hanif, Rabbani.
- East Pakistan Whites: Ranjit, Ghaznavi, Eugene Gomes, Arzu, Nabi, Shamsu, Rashid Chunna, S.A. Jamman Mukta, Kabir, Mari, Shah Alam.
