= Aamir Mahmood =

Pakistani footballer

Personal information
- Full name: Aamir Mahmood Butt
- Date of birth: 11 April 1970 (age 56)
- Place of birth: Lahore, Pakistan
- Position: Centre-back

Senior career*
Years	Team	Apps	(Gls)
1980s–1990s	Wohaib		
1993	→ Defence FC (loan)		

International career
1991	Pakistan Olympic		
1991–1993	Pakistan	18	(0)
Medal record
Men's football
Representing Pakistan
South Asian Games
Gold medal – first place	1991 Colombo	Team competition
- * Club domestic league appearances and goals

Aamir Mahmood Butt (Urdu: عامر محمود بٹ; born 11 April 1970) is a Pakistani former footballer who played as a centre-back. Mahmood was part of the Pakistan national team which retained the gold medal at the 1991 South Asian Games.

== Club career ==
Mahmood played for Wohaib club in the 1980s and 1990s. He was part of Wohaib team as captain which participated in the 1992–93 Asian Club Championship, which became the first Pakistani club to pass the qualifying round of the Asian Club Championship. Mahmood also represented Defence Club at the 1993–94 Asian Club Championship qualifying round against Oman Club.

Mahmood also represented the Punjab provincial team at the National Football Championship representing the side at the 1989–90 Asian Club Championship.

== International career ==
In 1991, Mahmood represented the Pakistan national under-23 football team at the 1992 Summer Olympics Qualifiers against Yemen, Qatar, United Arab Emirates and Iran. He was later selected for the Pakistan national team for the 1991 South Asian Games where he featured as a regular starter, and helped the team win the gold medal after defeating Maldives in the final. The next year he played at the 1992 AFC Asian Cup qualification, and the 1992 Jordan International Tournament. He featured in Pakistan's second participation at the 1994 FIFA World Cup qualification in 1993, playing in all matches where Pakistan ended up unsuccessful.

== Post-retirement ==
Mahmood obtained his AFC C coaching license following his retirement as player. He also served as sports director at Lahore Leads University. In 2020, Mahmood became member of the committee of Punjab Football Association.

== Honours ==
=== Pakistan ===
- South Asian Games: 1991
