= Shabbir Hussain =

Pakistani footballer (born 1965)

- Hussain in 1987

Personal information
- Full name: Shabbir Hussain
- Date of birth: 13 March 1965
- Place of birth: Quetta, Pakistan
- Date of death: 31 December 2024 (aged 59)
- Place of death: Australia
- Position: Midfielder

Senior career*
Years	Team	Apps	(Gls)
- Hazara Club Quetta
1982–1984	Pakistan Army		
1985–1989	Pakistan Steel		
1990–1995	WAPDA		
1992	→ Wohaib (loan)		

International career
1987–1992	Pakistan		(0)
- * Club domestic league appearances and goals

Shabbir Hussain (Urdu: شبیر حسین; 13 March 1965 – 31 December 2024) was a Pakistani footballer who played as a midfielder for the Pakistan national team during the 1980s and 1990s. He also contributed to the national team's first South Asian Games title in 1989.

== Club career ==
Hussain began his career with Hazara Club Quetta, and later went on to play for Pakistan Army, Pakistan Steel, and WAPDA. He was also crucial to WAPDA's victory in the 1991 National Football Championship, as well as their win for the 1992 National Games.

He was also borrowed by Wohaib FC to take part in the qualifying round of the 1992–93 Asian Club Championship, where the team earned victories over Club Valencia from Maldives and Brothers Union from Bangladesh to qualify for Group B, becoming the first Pakistani club to pass the qualifying round of an Asian competition. However after the qualification, Hussain returned to WAPDA after the start of the 1992–93, held from 20 October 1992 to 14 February 1993.

== International career ==
In 1987, Hussain was first selected by the Pakistan national team for the 1988 Summer Olympics Qualification in Nepal. He played in the 1990 FIFA World Cup qualification for Pakistan in 1989. He also played as substitute in the 1989 South Asian Games final against Bangladesh, which Pakistan would go on to win by 1–0. He then featured in the 1990 Asian Games.

In 1992, Hussain played at the 1992 AFC Asian Cup qualification. The same year, he participated with the national team at the 1992 Jordan International Tournament.

== Honours ==
=== Player ===
- National Football Championship
  - Winners (1): 1991
- National Games
  - Winners (1): 1992
