= Khyber Pakhtunkhwa Football Association =

Regional football governing body in Pakistan

- Sport: Association football
- Jurisdiction: Khyber Pakhtunkhwa, Pakistan
- Abbreviation: KPFA
- Founded: August 1937
- Affiliation: Pakistan Football Federation (PFF)
- President: Nasrullah Khan
- Secretary: Haji Hussain Ahmed (Acting)

The Khyber Pakhtunkhwa Football Association, historically named as the North-West Frontier Province Football Association until 2010, is the regional administrative governing body for the sport of association football in the Khyber Pakhtunkhwa province of Pakistan. It is affiliated with the Pakistan Football Federation.

== History ==
In March 1932, the North-West India Football Association (NWIFA) was established in Lahore to coordinate operations across Punjab, Sindh, Balochistan, Delhi, and the NWFP. A separate NWFP Football Association was subsequently founded as an independent governing body in August 1937.

Following the partition of British India and the independence of Pakistan in 1947, the association aligned as a formal constituent under the newly established Pakistan Football Federation. The association managed the NWFP provincial selection team which regularly competed in the National Football Championship from 1948 until the tournament's eventual restructuring, securing national runner-up finishes in 1952, 1953, and 1955.

In 2010, following the passage of the Eighteenth Amendment to the Constitution of Pakistan which formally renamed the province, the organisation officially updated its legal nomenclature to the Khyber Pakhtunkhwa Football Association.

During the mid-2010s crisis within the Pakistan Football Federation, the longtime KPFA president Syed Zahir Ali Shah formed a reformistic bloc that challenged the national leadership of Faisal Saleh Hayat. This power struggle led to parallel meetings and litigation across the Pakistani judicial system, culminating in the 2018 Supreme Court-mandated PFF elections.

Following years of institutional stagnation and the appointment of a FIFA Normalisation Committee, a formal provincial election process was instituted. Zahir Ali Shah initially secured reelection to the KPFA presidency. However, in April 2025, the PFF Disciplinary Committee issued a ten-year ban against Zahir Ali Shah from all football-related activities, citing allegations related to the formation of a parallel congress in 2015 and the management of local project funds. Following the intervention, the KPFA congress officially ratified Nasrullah Khan assuming charge as president of the KPFA, alongside Haji Hussain Ahmed as the Acting General Secretary.

== See also ==
- Pakistan Football Federation
- Punjab Football Association
- Sindh Football Association
- Azad Kashmir Football Association
