= Mahmood Shah =

Pakistani football referee

- Full name: Syed Mahmood Shah
- Born: 1902; North-West Frontier Province, British India
- Died: 1962 (aged 59–60); Unknown
- Other occupation: Sports Administrator

Domestic
Years	League	Role
1950s	National Football Championship	Referee

Syed Mahmood Shah, alternatively spelled as Syed Mahmud Shah, (Urdu: محمود شاہ) was a Pakistani football referee. He is regarded as one of the earliest international football referees from Pakistan.

== Early life ==
Shah was born in 1902 at North-West Frontier Province, British India.

== Refereeing career ==
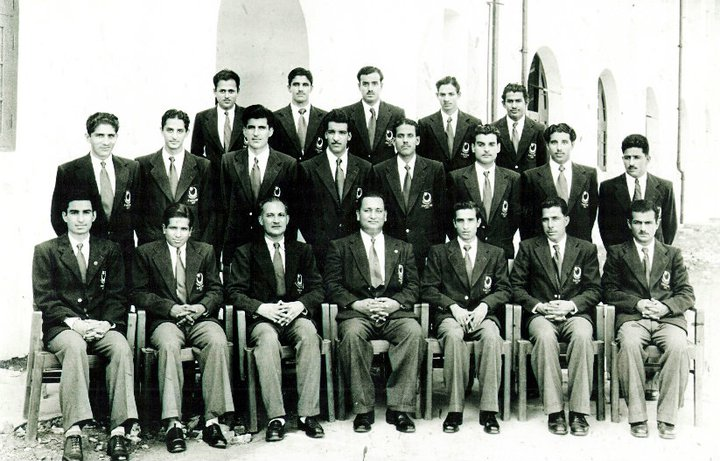
Shah (sitting third from left, bottom row), with Pakistan in 1953.

Shah referred matches in the National Football Championship at domestic level.

In 1952, Shah accompanied the Pakistan national football team as their manager and referee, for their participation in the 1952 Asian Quadrangular Football Tournament held in Ceylon. In the 1953 edition, he supervised the match between India and Burma.

At the 1957 National Football Championship, Shah was assigned to supervise the semi-final match between East Pakistan and Balochistan on 3 November, however, following the conclusion of the game, local fans threw stones at Shah, due to his alleged controversial decisions during the match, which resulted in a brawl, in which seventy-seven people being injured, including fifty-four policemen.

== Administrative career ==
After his retirement from the field of refereeing, Shah transitioned into an administrative role, due to his efforts, several various sporting meets were organized in NWFP, he served as the Chairman of the Pakistan Board of Referees at one point as well, and was a member of the selection committee for the national team.

== Death ==
Shah passed away in 1962.
