= Rajoa Sadat =

- Town
- Location within Pakistan
- Coordinates: 31°36′13″N 72°43′35″E
- Country: Pakistan
- Province: Punjab
- District: Chiniot

Rajoa Sadat is a town and Union Council of Chiniot District, Punjab, Pakistan. The town is situated near Faisalabad-Sargodha Road. The shrine of Pir Shah Daulat, brother of Pir Shah Jeewna, is located here.

Rajoa Sadat is known in Pakistan for the several tent pegging riders from the town entering competitions.

== Demography ==
The population according to the 2012 Census of Pakistan was 35,318.
