= Muhammad Aslam Japani =

Pakistani professional association football manager

Personal information
- Date of birth: 1 January 1941
- Place of birth: Jalandhar, British India
- Date of death: 30 March 2009 (aged 68)
- Place of death: Lahore, Pakistan
- Position: Right back

Senior career*
Years	Team	Apps	(Gls)
- Raiders
- WAPDA

International career
1970	Pakistan		

Managerial career
- 1990–1992: WAPDA
- 1991–1993: Pakistan
- * Club domestic league appearances and goals

Muhammad Aslam Japani (1 January 1941 – 30 March 2009) was a Pakistani football player and manager. Under his coaching tenure Pakistan won the gold medal at the 1991 South Asian Games.

== Playing career ==
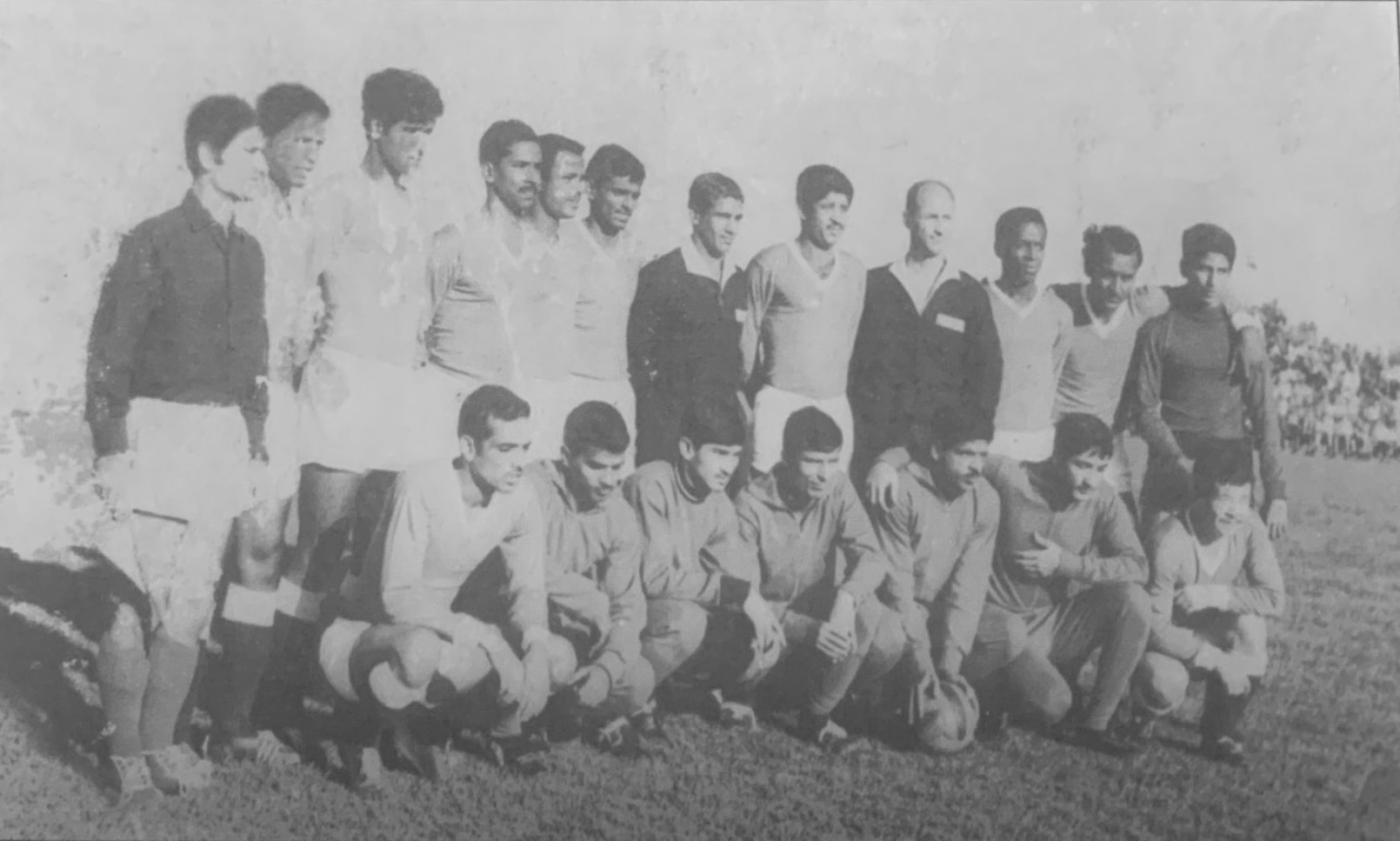
Aslam sitting second from left to right with the Pakistan national team squad for the 1970 RCD Cup

Aslam played for Pakistan youth team in the 1960s. He was part of the squad of the senior Pakistan national football team for the 1970 RCD Cup held in Tehran, Iran.

== Coaching career ==
=== WAPDA ===
After retiring as player, Aslam served as the Sports Officer of WAPDA. During his tenure as coach, WAPDA achieved remarkable victories, including winning the 1991 National Football Championship at Railway Stadium and securing gold at the National Games 1992 held at Minto Park in Lahore.

=== Pakistan ===
One of Aslam's most memorable moments occurred in 1991 when Pakistan triumphed over Maldives with a 2–0 score to clinch the gold medal at the 1991 South Asian Games held at Sugathadasa Stadium in Colombo. He led Pakistan during the Barcelona Olympics Qualifiers in 1991 and the 1992 AFC Asian Cup. He also served as head coach during the 1994 FIFA World Cup AFC qualifiers, the 1993 SAARC Gold Cup and the 1993 South Asian Games. Additionally, he was appointed as the Match Commissioner for the Pakistan Premier League in 2005 by the Pakistan Football Federation president Faisal Saleh Hayat.

== Personal life ==
Aslam was born in Jalandhar in the Punjab province of British India.

He died on Monday 30 March 2009 after a prolonged illness.

== Honours ==
=== Club ===
==== WAPDA ====
- National Football Championship: 1990–1991

=== International ===
==== Pakistan ====
- South Asian Games: 1991
