= Niamat Ullah Durrani =

Pakistani former footballer

Personal information
- Full name: Niamat Ullah Khan Durrani
- Position: Defender

Senior career*
Years	Team	Apps	(Gls)
1950s	Colony Textile Mills		
1950s	Rovers		
1950s	Olympians		

International career
1959–1960	Pakistan		
- * Club domestic league appearances and goals

Niamat Ullah Durrani, (Urdu: نعمت اللہ درانی) was a former Pakistani footballer, who played as a defender for the Pakistan national football team.

== Club career ==
Niamat was selected from Emerson University for the "Tigers" team, one of two teams made for the Punjab University football team.

On domestic level, Niamat played for the Colony Textile Mills football team, Rovers, and Olympians Club of Lahore at the Lahore District Football League and regional tournaments.

Niamat also represented the Punjab Province at the National Football Championship from 1956 onwards, helping them win the competition several times. He later represented the Lahore Division selection.

== International career ==
In 1959, Niamat was called up to the Pakistan national team by coach John McBride for their tour to Burma. The following year, he represented Pakistan at the 1960 Merdeka Tournament.

== Honours ==
- Lahore District Football League:
  - Winners (1): 1962 (shared)
