= Tanveer ul Hasnain =

Pakistani footballer

Personal information
- Date of birth: 29 May 1967 (age 59)
- Place of birth: Lahore, Pakistan
- Positions: Left back; left winger

Senior career*
Years	Team	Apps	(Gls)
1989–1991	Punjab		
1992–1993	Wohaib		

International career
1991	Pakistan Olympic		
1991–1993	Pakistan	8	(0)
Medal record
Men's football
Representing Pakistan
South Asian Games
Gold medal – first place	1991 Colombo	Team competition
- * Club domestic league appearances and goals

Tanveer ul Hasnain (Urdu: تنویر الحسنین; born 29 May 1967) is a Pakistani former footballer who played as a left back and left winger. Tanveer was part of the Pakistan national team which retained the gold medal at the 1991 South Asian Games.

== Club career ==
Tanveer initially took athletics as his path, and competed in several district and division level events. He later started playing football for local Hero Football Club. He represented the Punjab provincial team at the National Football Championship representing the side at the 1989–90 Asian Club Championship. He was also member of the Wohaib club which participated in the 1992–93 Asian Club Championship, where he scored the lone goal for Wohaib in a 1–1 draw against PAS Tehran FC in their final group game in Bahrain.

== International career ==
Tanveer first represented the Pakistan Blue team at the fifth 1987 Quaid-e-Azam International Tournament held in Lahore.

Four years later in 1991, he represented the Pakistan national under-23 football team at the 1992 Summer Olympics Qualifiers against Yemen, Qatar, United Arab Emirates and Iran. He was later selected for the Pakistan national team for the 1991 South Asian Games where he featured as a regular starter, and helped the team win the gold medal after defeating Maldives in the final. Two years later, he represented Pakistan as vice captain at the inaugural 1993 SAARC Gold Cup and the 1993 South Asian Games held in Dhaka.

== Post-retirement ==
Tanveer obtained his AFC C coaching license following his retirement as player, and served as youth coach for several schools and his former club Wohaib.

== Personal life ==
Tanveer hails from Lahore, and from a family of athletes. One of his brothers Zia Sabtain also played as footballer for the Pakistan national youth team while his youngest brother Muhammad Saqlain is a former captain of the Pakistan national field hockey team who represented the country at the 2008 Beijing Olympics. Another brother Imamuddin is a pole vaulter, who represented Pakistan in the 1986 Asian Games.

== Honours ==
=== Pakistan ===
- South Asian Games:
  - Winners (1): 1991
