= Muhammad Abdul Malik =

Pakistani former footballer

Abdul Malik
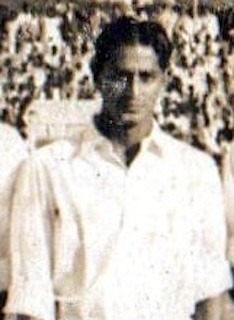
- Malik with Pakistan in 1955

Personal information
- Full name: Muhammad Abdul Malik
- Place of birth: Punjab, British India
- Position: Defender

Youth career
- 1948–1952: Punjab University

Senior career*
Years	Team	Apps	(Gls)
1950s	Sutlej Cotton Mills		

International career
1953–1955	Pakistan		
- * Club domestic league appearances and goals

Muhammad Abdul Malik was a Pakistani footballer who played as a defender. He represented the Punjab football team throughout the 1950s, and also played for the Pakistan national team in the early 1950s.

== Club career ==
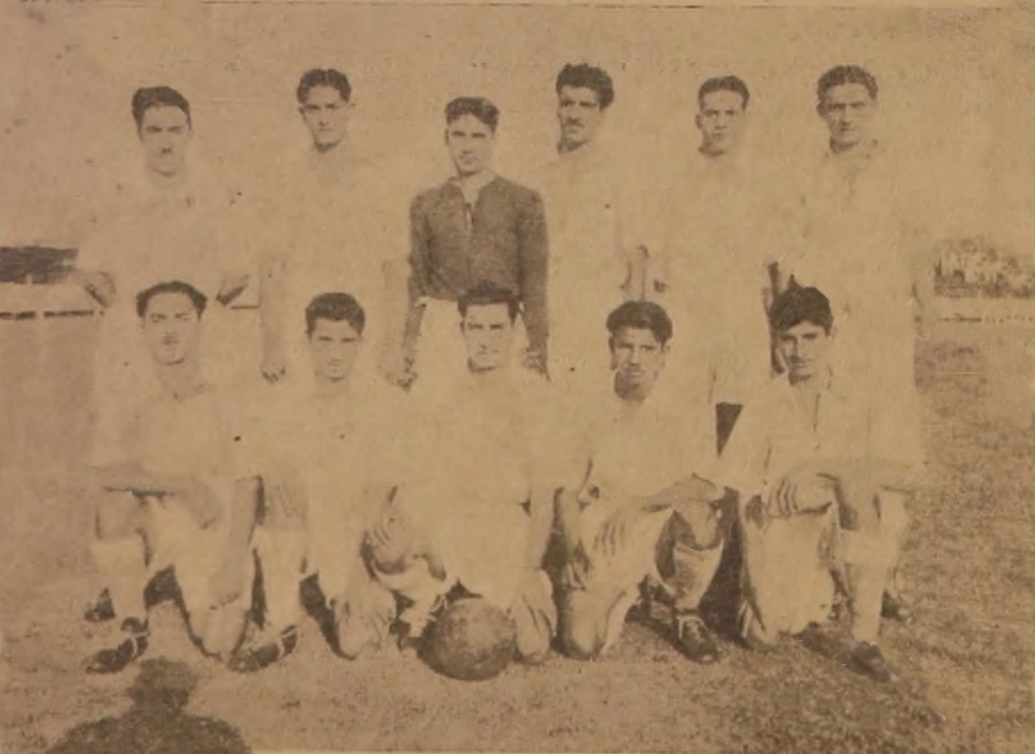
Malik, (second from left), with the Punjab football team in 1952.

Malik played for the Punjab University Football team from 1948 to 1952. He then played for Okara based departmental side Sutlej Cotton Mills in the 1950s.

He also represented the Punjab football team selection at the National Football Championship, helping them win several championships. He was also a part of the Punjab team when they played against touring Iran at Lahore in 1952.

== International career ==
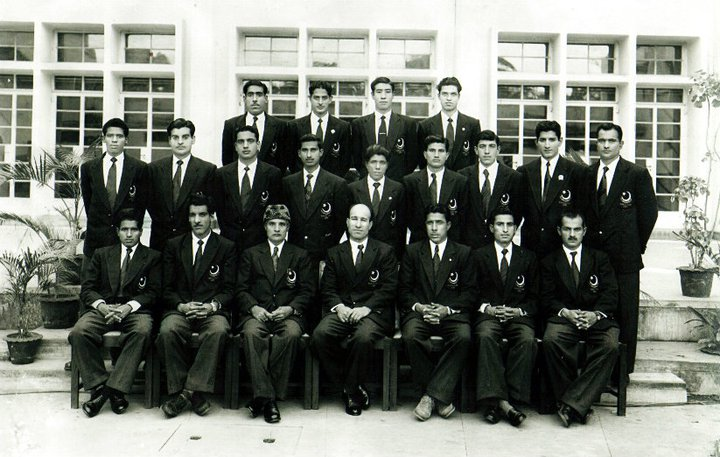
Pakistan national team in 1955, with Malik (second from top left).

In 1953, Malik was called up to the Pakistan national team for the 1953 Asian Quadrangular Football Tournament held in Rangoon, Burma. The following year, he played in a friendly against Singapore which ended in a 2–2 draw. He was also present with the Pakistan team for their participation in the 1954 Asian Games.

The next year, he featured in all three matches at the 1954 Asian Quadrangular Football Tournament. Malik last played with the Pakistan national team at the 1955 Asian Quadrangular Football Tournament.

== Honours ==
- National Football Championship
  - Winners (5): 1952, 1953, 1954, 1955, 1957
