= Masood ul Hassan Butt =

Pakistani footballer

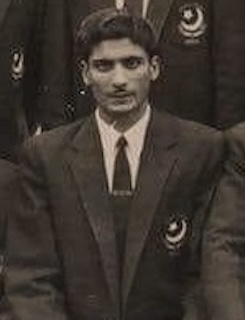
- Hassan in 1959

Personal information
- Date of birth: 1933
- Place of birth: Lahore, British India
- Date of death: 25 March 2013 (aged 80)
- Place of death: Lahore, Pakistan
- Position: Center half

Senior career*
Years	Team	Apps	(Gls)
1950s	Olympians Club		

International career
1956–1960	Pakistan		

Managerial career
- 1978: Pakistan
- * Club domestic league appearances and goals

Masood ul Hassan Butt (Urdu: مسعود الحسن بٹ; 1933 – 25 March 2013) was a Pakistani footballer who played as a midfielder, and manager. He represented the Pakistan national football team from 1956 to 1960, captaining in 1959. He also served as head coach of Pakistan at the 1978 Saudi Arabia Football Federation International Tournament.

== Club career ==
Hailing from Lahore, Hassan played football from 1948 to 1968. He played for Olympians Club of Lahore in the 1950s. He also represented regional selections of Punjab and Lahore Division at the National Football Championship.

== International career ==
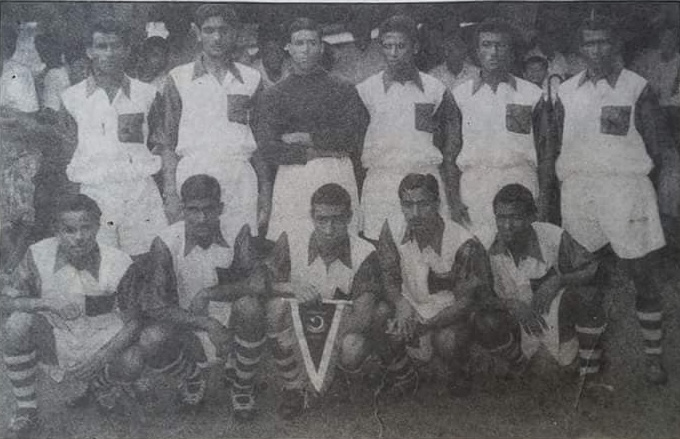
Hassan (standing second from left) with the Pakistan national team, c. 1959

Hassan represented the Pakistan national football team from 1956 to 1962. In 1959, he captained the national team in a tour to Burma under former Scottish goalkeeper turned guest coach/selector John McBride. The same year, he played at the 1960 AFC Asian Cup qualification. He last played with the national team at the 1960 Merdeka Tournament.

== Post-retirement ==
Following his retirement, he remained affiliated with the football working as coach of Sports Board Punjab, and leaded the national selection committee from 1984 to 1986. In 1978, he acted as head coach for the Pakistan national team which participated in the Saudi Arabia Football Federation International Tournament in Riyadh.

He was also guest along with German coach Holger Obermann at the 2006–07 Pakistan Premier League.

== Death ==
Hassan died on Monday of 25 March 2013 at the age of 80 after a protracted illness. Asian Football Confederation General Secretary Dato' Alex Sooray and Russian Football Union President Nikolai Tolstykh sent condolence letters to Pakistan Football Federation President Faisal Saleh Hayat on his demise.

== See also ==
- List of Pakistan national football team captains
