= Muhammad Hanif (footballer) =

Pakistani former footballer

Personal information
- Full name: Muhammad Hanif
- Date of birth: Unknown
- Place of birth: British India
- Date of death: Unknown
- Position: Forward

Senior career*
Years	Team	Apps	(Gls)
1950s	Punjab		

International career
1956–1958	Pakistan		
- * Club domestic league appearances and goals

Muhammad Hanif was a Pakistani footballer who played as a forward. He represented the Punjab football team throughout the 1950s, and also represented the Pakistan national team in 1956 and at the 1958 Asian Games.

== Club career ==
Hanif represented the Punjab football team in the 1950s. He played a key role throughout the 1950s with the team at the National Football Championship which he helped them win on several occasions. In 1955, Hanif had an exceptional campaign, providing several assists as well as a goal in the quarter-finals, and then in the replayed final which ended in a 5–1 victory. In 1957, Hanif also helped the Punjab football team win the 1957 National Football Championship, finding the net in the semi-final as well as the final.

== International career ==
In 1956, Hanif was selected for the Pakistan football team for their far east tour to Ceylon, Singapore, and China. In the tour, he scored a brace against an Indo Malayan XI in a 1–6 win. He also scored against a Guangzhou XI to secure a 1–1 draw.

In 1958, Hanif was selected to represent the Pakistan national football team for their participation in the 1958 Asian Games.

== Career statistics ==
=== International goals ===
Scores and results list Pakistan's goal tally first, score column indicates score after each Hanif goal.

List of international goals scored by Muhammad Hanif
No.	Date	Venue	Opponent	Score	Result	Competition	Ref.
1	26 August 1956	Government Services Ground, Colombo, Ceylon	Ceylon	2–0	5–3	Friendly	

== Honours ==
=== Punjab ===
- National Football Championship
  - Winners (6): 1952, 1953, 1954, 1955, 1957, 1958
