= Sindh Football Association =

- Sport: Association football
- Jurisdiction: Sindh, Pakistan
- Abbreviation: SFA
- Founded: 1947; 79 years ago
- Affiliation: Pakistan Football Federation (PFF); Sindh Sports Board (SSB)
- President: Azam Khan

The Sindh Football Association is the regional governing body of association football in the province of Sindh, Pakistan. It is affiliated with the Pakistan Football Federation.

== History ==
=== Early origins and evolution ===
The roots of football governance in Sindh date back to the pre-independence era under the North-West India Football Association, established in 1932. Following the creation of Pakistan in 1947, the regional body evolved into the Sind-Karachi Football Association, governing both the province of Sindh and the Karachi Federal Capital Territory. The regional selection won the inaugural National Football Championship in 1948 as the "Sindh Reds."

In November 1950, an administrative separation took place, leading to the creation of an independent Karachi Football Association to manage the high concentration of clubs within the federal capital, while the Sindh Football Association focused on the broader province. The regional representative selection also secured another domestic success by winning the National Football Championship title in 1975.

=== Recent years ===
In 2009, administrative friction developed within the executive committee regarding structural appointments and coordination with the central PFF body, leading to the high-profile resignation of the association's general secretary.

During the prolonged crisis that hit the Pakistan Football Federation starting in 2015, the SFA became deeply entangled in political infighting between rival power blocs. Regional football activities across Sindh stalled as a result. FIFA intervened by appointing a regional Normalisation Committee for the SFA to handle temporary operations, review regulatory adherence, and prepare the provincial body for clean elections.

== See also ==
- Football in Pakistan
- Pakistan Football Federation
- Punjab Football Association
- Balochistan Football Association
- Khyber Pakhtunkhwa Football Association
