= Abdul Sattar Gabol =

Pakistani politician

- عبدالستار گبول
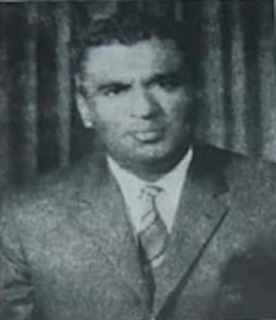

Personal details
- Born: Karachi, British India
- Died: 23 July 2006 (aged 77) Karachi, Pakistan
- Party: PPP
- Parent: Allah Bakhsh Gabol (father)
- Relatives: Nabil Gabol (nephew)

Abdul Sattar Gabol (died 23 July 2006) was a Pakistani politician and one of the founding members of the Pakistan People's Party (PPP). He served as the Minister of Labour and Manpower from 30 March 1977 to 5 July 1977. He also served as the Sindh Provincial Minister for Health, Labour and Social Welfare and president of the Pakistan Football Federation.

== Biography ==
Abdul Sattar Gabol was born to Allah Bakhsh Gabol who served twice as the mayor of Karachi, in 1953 and 1962.

Gabol began his political career in the 1970s as a member of the Pakistan People's Party (PPP), after defeating Mahmoud Haroon in 1970. He was elected twice as a member of the National Assembly from the Lyari constituency and served as a minister both at the national and provincial levels when the PPP was in power.

Gabol left politics following disputes with senior party members of PPP.

== Pakistan Football Federation ==
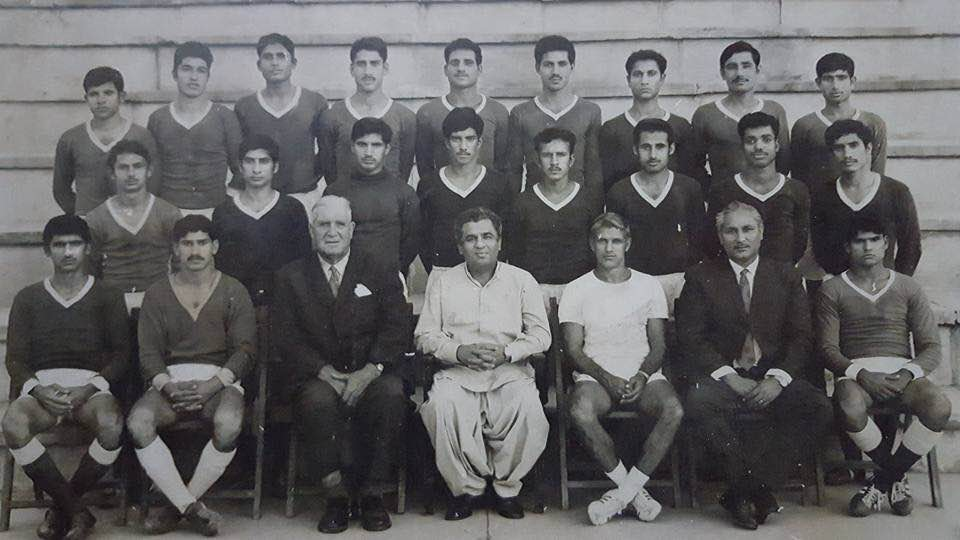
Sattar (sitting in middle) with the Pakistan youth football team in 1973

Sattar served as president of the Pakistan Football Federation between 1972 and 1977. During his tenure, he laid the foundation of the Lyari Football House in Lyari in 1976, which served as the headquarters of Pakistani football until the foundation of the FIFA House Lahore in 2003.

He also served a crucial role in convincing Pakistan national team legend Abdul Ghafoor to came out of international football retirement to play one last time for Pakistan in the 1974 Asian Games.

== Death ==
Sattar died on 23 July 2006 after suffering a heart attack.
