= Sardar Ali Dara =

Pakistani former footballer

S.A. Dara
- Dara, post-retirement

Personal information
- Full name: Sardar Ali Dara
- Date of birth: Unknown
- Place of birth: Lahore, British India
- Date of death: Unknown
- Position: Goalkeeper

Senior career*
Years	Team	Apps	(Gls)
- Olympians FC
- * Club domestic league appearances and goals

Sardar Ali Dara, commonly known as S.A. Dara, (Urdu: سردار علی دارا) was a former Pakistani footballer, who later became a referee.

== Early life ==
Dara hailed Lahore.

== Playing career ==
Dara played for the Olympians Club of Lahore. He also represented the Punjab football team at the National Football Championship on several occasions.

He was held as a stand-by for the Pakistan national football team for their participation at the 1955 Asian Quadrangular Football Tournament.

While still playing, Dara would occasionally officiate matches, before transitioning into the role of a referee full-time after his retirement. He was also appointed as the coach of the Punjab football team for the 1960 National Football Championship.

== Refereeing career ==
Following his retirement, Dara began refereeing matches at district level, before being selected to officiate key matches at the National Football Championship.

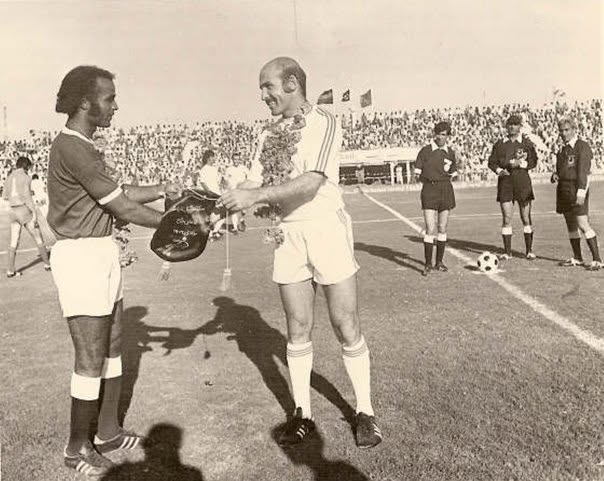
Dara (seen at the back, extreme right) before the match between Pakistan and Afghanistan in 1976.

Later on, Dara became an experienced prominent referee, supervising matches at the 1976 Quaid-e-Azam International Tournament, and the 1982 Quaid-e-Azam International Tournament.
