= Mohammad Al-Shamlan =

Bahraini football coach (born 1972)

Personal information
- Full name: Mohammed Shamlan Mubarak Basheer Al-Shamlan
- Date of birth: 26 December 1972 (age 53)
- Place of birth: Bahrain
- Position: Defender

Team information
- Current team: Hidd SCC (manager)

International career
| Years | Team | Apps | (Gls) |
- Bahrain

Managerial career
- 2005–2007: Pakistan (assistant)
- 2010: Bahrain U-23
- 2012–2013: Manama Club
- 2013–2015: Pakistan
- 2014–2015: Pakistan U-23
- 2016: Riffa SC
- 2017: Hidd SCC
- 2017–2019: Manama Club
- 2019–2021: Hidd SCC
- 2021: Al-Khaldiya SC
- 2022–: Hidd SCC

Mohammad Al-Shamlan (born 26 December 1972) is a Bahraini football coach. Besides Bahrain, he has managed in Pakistan. Leading the Bahrain Olympic Team to the 2010 Asian Games, he left them after a dismal campaign which saw them fail to progress past the group stage. Was denied entry into Palestine by Israel to join his team in the 2014 Palestine International Championship for some days and was forced to sit out of their first game.

== Career ==
He sent 5 goalkeeping coaches to License B training courses in Bahrain when managing Pakistan and was the only foreign coach to deliberately quit the Pakistan job.

=== Pakistan National Team ===
Mohammad Al-Shamlan was designated as manager of Pakistan in 2013, asking for a six-month buffer period in order to yield positive results. As their manager, he tried to utilize Pakistan's football talent but failed and quit the job in summer 2015, joining Riffa SC in the Bahraini Premier League. With Al-Shamlan as coach, Pakistan failed to progress to the second round of the 2018 FIFA World Cup qualification.

=== Pakistan Under 23's ===
Blamed for unsatisfactory results for the Pakistan U-23's in the 2016 AFC U-23 Championship qualifying stages and losing all matches, he was backed by the Pakistan Football Federation.
