= David Burns (football manager) =

Dutch-British football coach

Personal information
- Place of birth: England

Managerial career
- Years: Team
- 2000–2001: Pakistan

David Burns is a Dutch-British football manager. He is fluent in English and Dutch, and has basic knowledge of French and German.

== Playing career ==
Burns had played semi-professional football in the Netherlands, but an injury in 1982 forced him to quit. He decided to take up coaching instead.

== Managerial career ==
In 1983, Burns completed his course for a UEFA ‘A’ coaching badge. In the Netherlands he coaching clubs and worked the Royal Dutch Football Association’s Youth Plan. Burns also spent time coaching in Belgium, Germany, Jamaica, Canada and the USA.

He came to the UK in 1996 after getting British citizenship and managed Cheltenham Town’s youth team for a while before moving to Bristol City’s youth team's goalkeeping coach. He then spent a year as Southampton’s Academy goalkeeping coach.

In January 2000, he was chosen as a FIFA International Coach with the support of the Asian Football Confederation (AFC) and went to Pakistan to become part of their coaching staff alongside John Layton. During this time he also worked on the FIFA Coach Education Future Program to develop Pakistani coaches, and a lecturer in sport for the Pakistan Sports Board. After disputes with the PFF board, he returned to England in March 2001.

Burns worked freelance for Bristol Rovers and Bath City as a sports psychologist for a year. He then continued to coach around the world.

In July 2005, the PPF began negotiations with him to return as head coach of Pakistan. However, the PFF could not meet his package.
