= Sindh football team =

Sindh
- Coat of arms of Sindh, often featured in the team kit
- Full name: Sindh football team
- Ground: Various
- Owner: Sindh Football Association
- League: National Games

The Sindh football team is a Pakistani football team representing Sindh in regional football competitions including the National Games of Pakistan. The team competed at the National Football Championship, the premier football competition of Pakistan from 1948 till 2003.

== History ==
The team competed at the National Football Championship, the premier football competition of Pakistan from 1948 till 2003. In the beginning, the team was under the Sind-Karachi Football Association, the governing body of football in Sindh and the Karachi Federal Capital Territory. In 1950, a separate Karachi Football Association body was formed.

The team won two titles, including in the inaugural 1948 edition under the name of Sindh Reds, defeating the second string Sindh Blue. It also competed with the name Sindh Red in 1975 and 1978.

On 26 December 1983, the team played against visiting West Berlin University team from Germany, winning by 2–0, thanks to goals of Ghulam Sarwar Teddy and Ejaz.

In 2010, the provincial teams including Sindh competed in the 2010 KPT-PFF Cup, a cup competition organised by the Pakistan Football Federation featuring provincial and departmental teams, similar to the previous National Championship.

== Honours ==
- National Football Championship
  - Winners (2): 1948, 1975
  - Runners-up (1): 1978
- National Games
  - Silver medal (1): 2007

== See also ==
- Punjab football team
- Balochistan football team
- Khyber Pakhtunkhwa football team
- East Pakistan football team
- Karachi football team
