= Khawaja Riaz Ahmed =

Pakistani manager

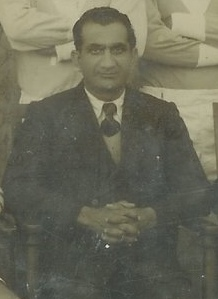
- Riaz in 1950

Personal information
- Full name: Khawaja Riaz Ahmed
- Date of birth: Unknown
- Place of birth: British India
- Date of death: Unknown

Managerial career
- Years: Team
- 1950: Pakistan
- 1954: Pakistan

Khawaja Riaz Ahmed (Urdu: خواجہ ریاض احمد) was a Pakistani football manager and sports organiser. Ahmed was the first manager of the Pakistan national football team in 1950.

== Career ==
Ahmed served as the Honorary Secretary of the North-West India Football Association from the years 1942 to 1947. After the independence of Pakistan, he served as the Honorary Secretary for the Punjab Football Association from 1947. He was also a referee.

In 1950, Ahmed became the first ever manager of the Pakistan national football team. He accompanied the team on their tour to Iran and Iraq. Ahmed would return for a second stint as manager with the national team for their participation in the 1954 Asian Games.

In the later years of his career, he would also serve as the Secretary of the Punjab Football Association.

== See also ==
- List of Pakistan national football team managers
