= Bilal Rafiq =

Pakistani footballer

Personal information
- Full name: Muhammad Bilal Rafiq
- Date of birth: 19 October 1985 (age 41)
- Place of birth: Pakistan
- Position: Goalkeeper

Youth career
- Wohaib

Senior career*
Years	Team	Apps	(Gls)
2005–2006	Wohaib		
2006–2008	Habib Bank		
2008–2018	Pakistan Airlines		

International career
2008	Pakistan	4	(0)
- * Club domestic league appearances and goals

Muhammad Bilal Rafiq (born 19 October 1985) is a Pakistani former footballer who played as a goalkeeper.

== Club career ==
Rafiq first represented Lahore based club Wohaib, also representing the team at youth level. He also represented Lahore Lajpaals at the franchise based 2007 Super Football League.

He later joined departmental side Habib Bank in 2006, until eventually joining Pakistan Airlines.

== International career ==
Rafiq played as the main goalkeeper for Pakistan at the 2008 SAFF Cup.

== Career statistics ==
=== International ===
Appearances and goals by year and competition
National team	Year	Apps	Goals
Pakistan	2008	4	0
Total		4	0
