= 2010 KPT-PFF Cup =

Tournament details
- Country: Pakistan
- City: Karachi
- Venues: 2
- Dates: 22 February – 7 March 2010
- Teams: 16

Final positions
- Champions: Karachi Port Trust (1st title)
- Runners-up: National Bank
- Third place: Khan Research Laboratories
- Fourth place: Balochistan

Tournament statistics
- Matches played: 32
- Top goal scorer: Safiullah Khan (9 goals)

Awards
- Best player: Zafar Majeed (KPT)
- Best goalkeeper: Amir Gul Chhutto

The 2010 KPT-PFF Cup was the inaugural edition of the KPT-PFF Cup, a domestic football cup organised by the Pakistan Football Federation (PFF) in collaboration with Karachi Port Trust (KPT). Played in Karachi from 22 February to 7 March 2010, it featured sixteen teams split into four groups with knockout rounds to follow.

Karachi Port Trust won the title, defeating National Bank 2–1 in the final at the KPT Stadium. Khan Research Laboratories beat Balochistan 8–0 to claim third place.

== Background and format ==
PFF introduced the KPT-PFF Cup as a new invitational tournament in early 2010. The field comprised leading departmental sides from the previous Pakistan Premier League season, in addition to provincial associations, divided into four groups (A–D). Twenty of the scheduled 32 matches were played at the KPT Stadium and twelve at the Quaid-i-Azam football field in Steel Town, Karachi.

Trials and selection for the provincial teams were conducted ahead of the event. A minute of silence was also held for deceased player Abdul Khaliq.

== Venues ==
- KPT Stadium, Kharadar (Karachi) – primary venue.
- Quaid-i-Azam football field, Steel Town (Karachi) – secondary venue.

== Teams ==
- Departmental teams: Khan Research Laboratories, National Bank, Habib Bank, Pakistan Army, KESC, Sui Southern Gas, Pakistan Navy, Pak Elektron, Pakistan Airlines, Karachi Port Trust, Pakistan Steel (admitted after a late withdrawal of Gilgit Baltistan provincial team)
- Provincial teams: Sindh, Balochistan, NWFP, Islamabad, Punjab.

== Group stage ==
=== Group A ===
Pos	Team	Pld	W	D	L	GF	GA	GD	Pts	Qualification
1	Khan Research Laboratories	3	3	0	0	10	1	+9	9	Advance to Knockout round
2	National Bank	3	2	0	1	6	5	+1	6	Advance to Knockout round
3	Habib Bank	3	1	0	2	1	6	−5	3	
4	Sindh	3	0	0	3	1	6	−5	0	

Source: RSSSF
24 February 2010

National Bank	5–0	Habib Bank
	Report

24 February 2010

Khan Research Laboratories	4–1	Sindh
	Report

26 February 2010

Habib Bank	1–0	Sindh
	Report

26 February 2010

Khan Research Laboratories	5–0	National Bank
	Report

28 February 2010

Khan Research Laboratories	1–0	Habib Bank
	Report

28 February 2010

Sindh	0–1	National Bank
	Report

=== Group B ===
Pos	Team	Pld	W	D	L	GF	GA	GD	Pts	Qualification
1	Karachi Electric Supply Corporation	3	1	2	0	1	0	+1	5	Advance to Knockout round
2	Balochistan	3	1	1	1	5	4	+1	4	Advance to Knockout round
3	Pakistan Army	3	1	1	1	1	2	−1	4	
4	Sui Southern Gas	3	1	0	2	4	5	−1	3	

Source: RSSSF
25 February 2010

Balochistan	2–0	Pakistan Army
	Report

25 February 2010

Karachi Electric Supply Corporation	1–0	Sui Southern Gas
	Report

27 February 2010

Karachi Electric Supply Corporation	0–0	Balochistan
	Report

27 February 2010

Pakistan Army	1–0	Sui Southern Gas
	Report

1 March 2010

Pakistan Army	0–0	Karachi Electric Supply Corporation
	Report

1 March 2010

Sui Southern Gas	4–3	Balochistan
	Report

=== Group C ===
Pos	Team	Pld	W	D	L	GF	GA	GD	Pts	Qualification
1	Pakistan Navy	3	2	1	0	3	0	+3	7	Advance to Knockout round
2	Pakistan Steel	3	1	2	0	1	0	+1	5	Advance to Knockout round
3	Pak Elektron	3	1	1	1	2	1	+1	4	
4	NWFP	3	0	0	3	0	5	−5	0	

Source: RSSSF
24 February 2010

Pakistan Navy	2–0	NWFP
	Report

24 February 2010

Pak Elektron	0–0	Pakistan Steel
	Report

26 February 2010

Pak Elektron	2–0	NWFP
	Report

26 February 2010

Pakistan Steel	0–0	Pakistan Navy
	Report

28 February 2010

Pakistan Navy	1–0	Pak Elektron
	Report

28 February 2010

Pakistan Steel	1–0	NWFP
	Report

=== Group D ===
Pos	Team	Pld	W	D	L	GF	GA	GD	Pts	Qualification
1	Punjab	3	2	1	0	9	7	+2	7	Advance to Knockout round
2	Karachi Port Trust	3	1	2	0	7	6	+1	5	Advance to Knockout round
3	Pakistan Airlines	3	1	1	1	3	3	0	4	
4	Islamabad	3	0	0	3	3	6	−3	0	

Source: RSSSF
23 February 2010

Punjab	4–4	Karachi Port Trust
	Report

25 February 2010

Pakistan Airlines	1–0	Islamabad
	Report

27 February 2010

Punjab	2–1	Pakistan Airlines
	Report

27 February 2010

Karachi Port Trust	2–1	Islamabad
	Report

1 March 2010

Karachi Port Trust	1–1	Pakistan Airlines
	Report

1 March 2010

Punjab	3–2	Islamabad
	Report

== Knockout round ==
=== Quarter-finals ===
2 March 2010

Khan Research Laboratories	2–1 (a.e.t.)	Pakistan Steel
	Report

2 March 2010

National Bank	3–0	Pakistan Navy
	Report

3 March 2010

Balochistan	4–0	Punjab
	Report

3 March 2010

Karachi Port Trust	2–0	Karachi Electric Supply Corporation
	Report

=== Semi-finals ===
5 March 2010

National Bank	1–0	Balochistan
	Report

5 March 2010

Karachi Port Trust	1–0	Khan Research Laboratories
	Report

=== Third-place match ===
6 March 2010

Balochistan	0–8	Khan Research Laboratories
	Report

=== Final ===
7 March 2010

Karachi Port Trust	2–1	National Bank
Younus 60'; Ahmed 79'	Report	Shah 82'

KPT Stadium, Karachi
