= Mohammad Shahjahan (footballer) =

Bangladeshi footballer and manager (1920–1992)

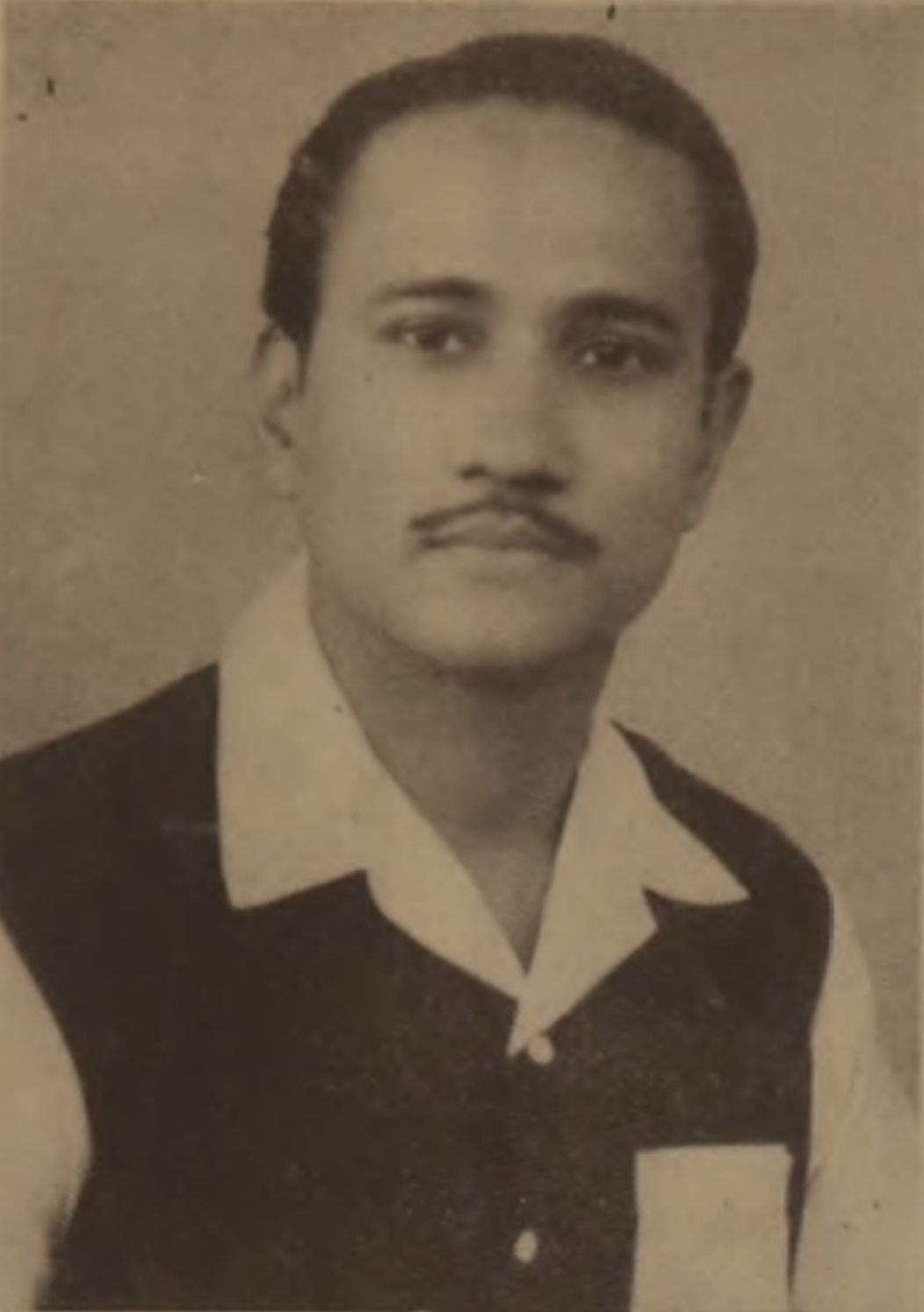
- Shahjahan during his playing days

Personal information
- Full name: Mohammad Shahjahan
- Date of birth: 1920
- Place of birth: Dacca, Bengal Presidency, British India (now Dhaka, Bangladesh)
- Date of death: 7 April 1992 (aged 72) (Note: Although some news sources indicate Shahjahan died on 3 April, primary source confirm his death on 7 April 1992.)
- Place of death: Dhaka, Bangladesh
- Position: Outside left

Senior career*
Years	Team	Apps	(Gls)
1935	Victoria SC		
1938–1939	East Bengal		
1940–1947	Kolkata Mohammedan		
1948–1956	Dhaka Mohammedan		

Managerial career
- 1952: Pakistan
- 1954: East Pakistan
- 1948–1960: Dhaka Mohammedan
- * Club domestic league appearances and goals

_{Subscript text}

Mohammad Shahjahan (Bengali: মোহাম্মদ শাহজাহান; 1920 – 7 April 1992) was a Bangladeshi football player and administrator. He is only the second East Pakistani, followed by Sheikh Shaheb Ali to coach the Pakistan national team.

== Early life ==
Born in Laxmibazar, Old Dhaka, British India in 1920, Shahjahan's passion for sports developed while studying in St. Gregory's High School. Eventually, he gained admission to Bangabasi College in Calcutta.

== Club career ==
=== Victoria SC ===
Shahjahan turned to football with Victoria SC in Dhaka in 1935.

=== Calacutta League ===
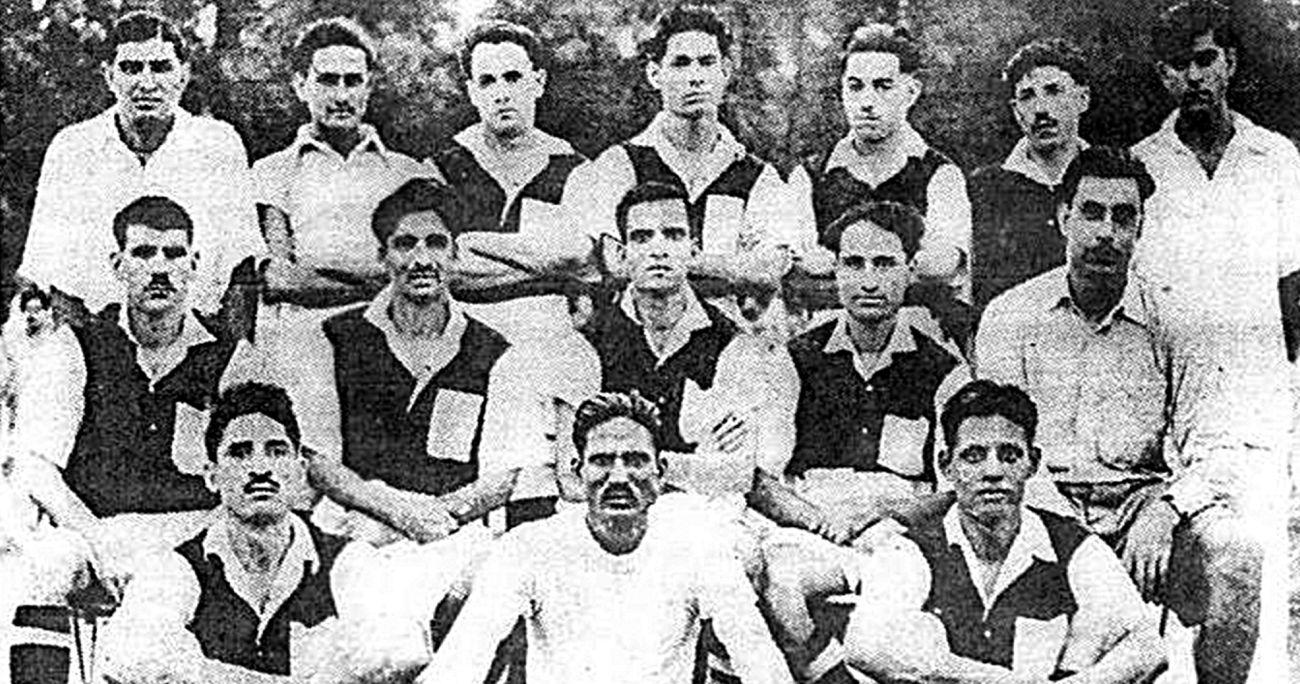
Shahjahan (standing second from left at the top) with 1940 CFL winning Kolkata Mohammedan.

After moving to Calcutta, he joined Gymkhana team. In 1938, he joined East Bengal in the Calcutta First Division League, playing as the club's inside-right until 1939. The following year, he joined Kolkata Mohammedan, remaining at the club until the partition of India, playing as an outside-left and winning numerous titles. He also served as club captain during the latter stages of his stint.

=== Dhaka Mohammedan ===
Following partition, Shahjahan represented Dhaka Mohammedan as a coach-cum-player while also serving in the club's administration. He also served as club captain in 1948, however, after assaulting the referee during a match against E.B. Railway, Shahjahan, along with his teammate Atflaf Hossain, was suspended for the remainder of the season.

== Other sports ==
During his time at Bangabasi College in Calcutta, he competed in the 400-metre and 800-metre sprint events at the Bengal Olympic Athletics meet. He also represented the hockey teams of both East Bengal Club and Kolkata Mohammedan in the Beighton Cup, and participated in several Olympic trials for the India national hockey team. He was also an emerging Kabaddi player, representing his regional team at the All-India Olympic Games.

== Coaching career ==
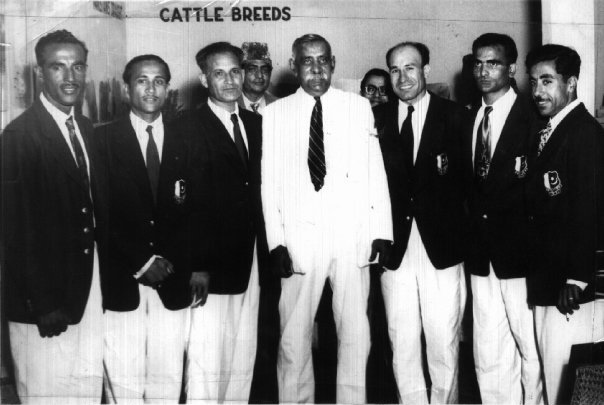
Shahjahan (second from left to right) pictured with the Pakistan national football team during the 1952 Asian Quadrangular Football Tournament

In 1952, Shahjahan would become the coach and assistant manager of the Pakistan national team for their participation in the 1952 Asian Quadrangular Football Tournament. In the tournament, Pakistan would win over Sri Lanka and Burma. Pakistan finished with the same number of points in the table and emerged as joint winners of the tournament after their encounter with India ended in a goalless draw. He also coached East Pakistan in the National Football Championship in Lahore in 1954. In 1965, he was included for the East Pakistan Sports Federation coaching committee as an honorary instructor alongside Rashid Ahmed.

== Post-playing career ==
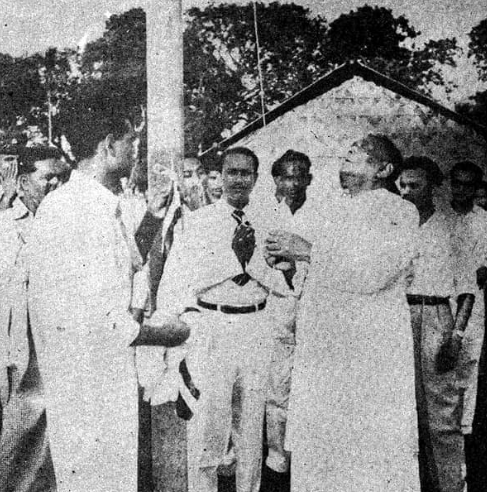
Shahjahan applauding in the middle as A. K. Fazlul Huq inaugurates the Dhaka Mohammedan club tent, 28 July 1957

Alongside Khwaja Nooruddin of Kolkata Mohammedan and several other sports personalities, Shahjahan helped form the East Pakistan Sports Federation (EPSF) in Calcutta prior to the partition of India. He served as its assistant secretary, while Nooruddin was the general secretary. The organization was later merged with the East Pakistan Sports Association and reintroduced in 1951, with Habibullah Bahar Chowdhury serving as its president.

Following partition, Shahjahan moved to Dhaka and became the general secretary of Dhaka Mohammedan, a position he held from 1948 to 1960. He inaugurated the Mohammedan club tents in both 1949 and 1957.

In 1956, he helped the club facilitate numerous players who joined from Dhaka Wanderers. In the same year, he was coach alongside Hafiz Rashid and Abbas Mirja and in 1957, Mohammedan won its inaugural First Division league title. He was also team manager when Mohammedan reached the quarter-final of the IFA Shield in 1958.

Shahjahan would go on to become a member of the governing body of the EPSF, also served as the honorary secretary. He would eventually resign in 1967, stating that:

"Today, EPSF is in the grip of politics. EPSF is now the training centre of politics in Dacca."

— Mr. Shahjahan's statement after his resignation with the EPSF.

For the GANEFO, Shahjahan led the march carrying the banner of East Pakistan. In 1962, he commentated the fourth hockey test match between the Pakistan hockey team and Kenya hockey team.

Following the Independence of Bangladesh, he served as the president of Bangladesh Athletics Federation and secretary of Bangladesh Olympic Association. Shahjahan received the National Award in 1976.

== Death ==
Shahjahan died on 7 April 1992.

== Honours ==
=== Player ===
Kolkata Mohammedan

- Calcutta Football League:
  - Winners (2): 1940, 1941
- Durand Cup:
  - Winners (1): 1940
- IFA Shield:
  - Winners (2): 1941, 1942

=== Manager ===
Pakistan

- Asian Quadrangular Football Tournament:
  - Winners (1): 1952

=== Individual ===
- 1976− National Sports Awards.

== See also ==
- List of Pakistan national football team managers
