= FIFA House Lahore =

FIFA house
- مکان فیفا

General information
- Location: Lahore, Pakistan, Opposite Punjab Stadium, Ferozepur Road
- Coordinates: 31°30′39″N 74°19′55″E
- Construction started: 2004
- Owner: Pakistan Football Federation

FIFA House, Lahore is looking after the sports of Football in Pakistan and provides guidance on international football standards. The main purpose of the FIFA House is to educate coaches, referees, women's football, beach soccer, and administrative and medical matters.

== History ==
The year 2004 saw changes in Pakistan football, with a new administration in place. The FIFA House was consequently built through FIFA GOAL Project in Ferozepur Road in Lahore. It replaced the Lyari Football House in Lyari which was built in 1976 by former PFF president Abdul Sattar Gabol.

Amidst a crisis within the Pakistan Football Federation starting from 2015, the FIFA House was controversially occupied by a rival faction. After regaining control in 2018, the Asian Football Confederation issued a grant for the rehabilitation and reconstruction of the house which had been badly damaged.

By the end of 2018, the house was handed over to Syed Ashfaq Hussain Shah, elected as the PFF chief by elections ordered by the Supreme Court of Pakistan, albeit to Fifa’s wrath for this being third-party interference again. In 2019, it was handled to a normalisation committee installed by FIFA whose task was to hold elections of the country's football governing body and bring it would bring an end to a four-year crisis.

On 27 March 2021, the office was again attacked and people inside held hostage by its former president, Syed Ashfaq Hussain Shah, and his group. A year later, the normalisation committee regained control of the house which resulted in the ban on the Pakistan Football Federation lifted.
