= Mohsen Gilani =

Pakistani football administrator

Syed Mohsen Gilani
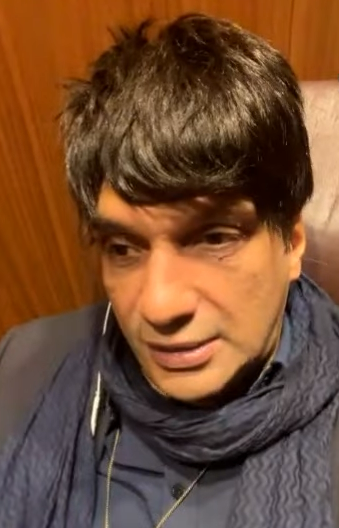
- Gilani in 2025
- Occupation: Football administrator
- Known for: President of the Pakistan Football Federation

Syed Mohsen Gilani (Urdu: سید محسن گیلانی) is a Pakistani football administrator who is serving as the president of the Pakistan Football Federation (PFF) since May 2025.

== Career ==
Gilani completed the FIFA Master programme in sports management and related executive education, including studies undertaken at the University of Oxford through a short-term professional programme.

Gilani later worked in areas connected to football development and governance in several countries, including collaborations with sport-development initiatives and administrative activities linked to FIFA-related programmes in Pakistan. He also worked with FC Midtjylland. In 2010, he founded his own club named Mohsen Gilani FC. In 2020, he was also elected president of Islamabad based club Pak Sporting FC.

From 2019 to 2025, the Pakistan Football Federation was administered by a FIFA-appointed Normalisation Committee established to resolve internal disputes and restore electoral procedures. In the Pakistan Football Federation elections held in May 2025, after forming an alliance with candidate Hafiz Zakaullah, Gilani secured the presidency by a vote of 13–11 in a closely contested ballot, replacing the Normalisation Committee upon completion of its mandate.

Under Gilani first year tenure in 2025, the PFF pursued international partnerships aimed at strengthening technical capacity. In 2025, Pakistan and Azerbaijan signed a memorandum of understanding covering youth development, coaching and administrative exchange. He also held meeting with FIFA president Gianni Infantino.

== See also ==
- Asian Football Confederation
