= Wang Xiao He =

Chinese football manager

Personal information
- Date of birth: 1952 (age 73–74)
- Place of birth: Xi'an, China
- Position: Forward

Senior career*
Years	Team	Apps	(Gls)
- Bayi

International career
1974–1975	China		

Managerial career
- 1989–1990: Pakistan
- 1990–1995: Pakistan Army
- 199?–1999: Bayi
- 2000: Xi'an Anxinyuan
- 200?–2003: Pakistan Army
- 2003–2004: Pakistan U23
- * Club domestic league appearances and goals

Wang Xiao He (simplified Chinese: 王晓和; traditional Chinese: 王曉和; pinyin: Wáng Xiǎo Hé; born 1952) is a Chinese former football player and manager.

Wang represented the China national team in the 1970s. He also managed the Pakistan national football team in several occasions. Under his leadership, Pakistan won the 1989 South Asian Games, and later the 2004 South Asian Games with the Pakistan national under-23 team.

== Early life ==
Wang was born in Xi'an, in the Shaanxi province of China.

== Playing career ==
Wang played for the Bayi Football Team in the 1970s. He was selected for the China national team squad for the 1974 Asian Games. There are also different opinions that he was selected for the 1975 friendly match squad or only for the youth team.

== Coaching career ==
Wang was first hired by the Pakistan Football Federation as part of the foreign aid by China before the 1989 South Asian Games, where he helped the side clinch the gold medal.

He later became affiliated with the Pakistan Army club. In 1995, he returned to China. In 1999, he led the Bayi Football Team. Xiaohe then coached Xi'an Anxinyuan, which had a cooperative relationship with the Bayi Football Team, but failed to achieve the goal of promotion and was fired. He returned to Pakistan to coach the Pakistan Army football team.

Installed again as head coach of Pakistan in December 2003 on the recommendations of the Pakistan Army club, with Tariq Lutfi and Balal Butt being named as his assistants, Wang was known for his stringent training program which focused on footballers' stamina during his time there. He again clinched the gold medal at the 2004 South Asian Games with the Pakistan national under-23 team.

In April 2004 Wang was discharged after the PFF didn't retain him. He later continued to coach military football players in Pakistan.

== Honours ==
=== Pakistan ===
- South Asian Games: 1989

=== Pakistan U23 ===
- South Asian Games: 2004
