= Afzal Khan (footballer) =

Pakistani footballer

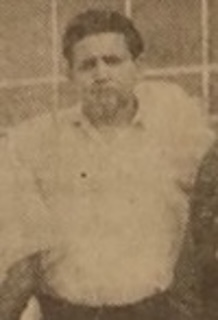
- Khan in 1964

Personal information
- Full name: Muhammad Afzal Khan
- Position: Half-back

Youth career
- 1943–: Delhi University

Senior career*
Years	Team	Apps	(Gls)
1941–1947	Delhi		
1950s	Karachi		

International career
1946	India XI		
1954	Pakistan	0	(0)

Managerial career
- 1966–1967: Pakistan
- 1969: Pakistan
- * Club domestic league appearances and goals

Muhammad Afzal Khan (Urdu: افضل خان) was a Pakistani footballer, manager and FIFA referee. Khan served as head coach of the Pakistan national football team in 1966–1967, and again in 1969.

== Club career ==
Afzal represented the Delhi football team from 1941 until 1947 in All-India Inter–Provincial Competitions, as well as the Santosh Trophy. He helped the team win the 1944–45 Santosh Trophy. He also served as the team's captain in 1946.

In 1943, he played for the football team of Delhi University in Inter-University Tournaments held at Aligarh. He represented the Karachi football team at the National Football Championship from 1948 till the 1950s.

Afzal also played for Moghals Club of Delhi. After partition, Afzal, along with several of the Delhi club's players would move to the newly formed Pakistan. Where Afzal, Munawar Hafiz, and Ahmed Hassan formed the "Pakistan Moghuls Club" of Karachi.

== International career ==
In 1946, Afzal was selected for an India XI for their tour to South Africa.

Afzal was a part of the Pakistan football team squad for the 1954 Asian Games held in Manila, Philippines.

== Coaching career ==
Afzal was selected assistant manager and coach for the Karachi football team for the 1958 National Football Championship.

In 1963, he was appointed manager cum referee of the Pakistan national team along with Shaheb Ali as head coach, during the friendly series against touring China.

In 1966, Afzal was appointed as the head coach of the Pakistan national team for the 1966 Asian Games. However Pakistan did not participate in the tournament due to financial restrictions. In March 1967, he served as head coach of Pakistan during the friendly series against Saudi Arabia. He was again appointed head coach for the tour of Pakistan to Soviet Union in May 1969.

== Refereeing career ==
Afzal was also a FIFA referee. He supervised the 1962 National Football Championship final between Dacca Division and Karachi Division. He also supervised the match between Turkey and Iran at the 1969 RCD Cup.

== Death ==
Afzal died in Pakistan.

In 1978, a football tournament was held in his memory. The tournament was won by PWD, who defeated KPT in the final by 1–0.

== See also ==
- List of Pakistan national football team managers

== Honours ==
Delhi

- Santosh Trophy: 1944–45; runner-up 1941–42
