= Muhammad Zaman Shah =

Pakistani former footballer

Zaman Shah
Personal information
- Full name: Muhammad Zaman Shah
- Date of birth: Unknown
- Place of birth: Quetta, British India
- Date of death: Unknown
- Place of death: Quetta, British India
- Positions: Center half; defender

Senior career*
Years	Team	Apps	(Gls)
1940s–1950s	Quetta Mohammadan		

International career
1950	Pakistan	1	(0)
- * Club domestic league appearances and goals

Muhammad Zaman Shah, (Urdu: محمد زمان شاہ) was a former Pakistani footballer, who played in the 1940s and 1950s, Zaman also represented Pakistan in 1950.

== Club career ==
Zaman played for the Quetta Mohammadan Club in the 1940s and 1950s. After partition, he also represented the Balochistan football team at the National Football Championship, helping them win the title in 1950.

== International career ==
After the conclusion of the 1950 National Football Championship, Zaman was selected for the Pakistan national team's tour to Iran and Iraq. Where he was a part of the starting line-up for the team's international debut.

== Honours ==
=== Balochistan ===
- National Football Championship:
  - Winners (1): 1950
