= Younus Rana =

Pakistani footballer (born 1941)

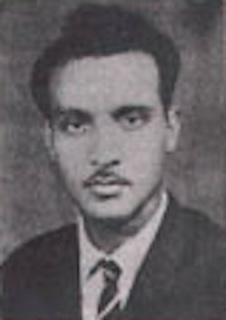
- Rana in 1967

Personal information
- Date of birth: 10 April 1941 (age 85)
- Place of birth: Hoshiarpur, British India
- Position: Midfielder

Senior career*
Years	Team	Apps	(Gls)
1961–1979	Pakistan Western Railway		

International career
1963–1970	Pakistan		

Managerial career
- 1981–1983: Pakistan
- 1987: Pakistan
- 2003–2005: PTCL
- * Club domestic league appearances and goals

Younus Rana (born 10 April 1941), is a Pakistani former footballer and manager. Rana played as a midfielder for the Pakistan national team in the 1960s and 1970s. He is also one of the players to have played and served as head coach of the national team.

== Early life ==
Rana was born on 10 April 1941 in Hoshiarpur, in the Punjab province of British India. After the partition, his family moved to Multan where he represented the football team of Emerson University.

== Club career ==
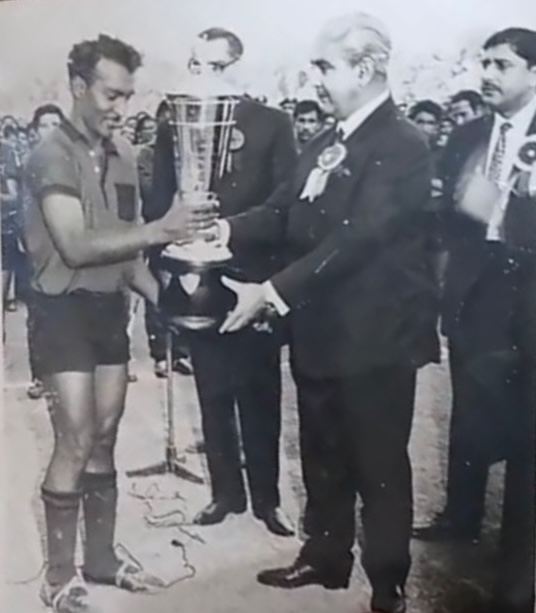
Pakistan Western Railway captain Rana receiving the 1969 National Football Championship trophy from president Yahya Khan in Lahore

Rana represented the Pakistan Western Railway departmental team from 1961 till 1979, earning the captaincy in 1965. He also represented several clubs in domestic competitions such as Rangers Club and Rovers Club from Lahore, and Baloch FC Quetta. In the 1969 edition of the National Football Championship held in Lahore, Rana helped the side finish champions after defeating Karachi in the final.

== International career ==
Younus was first selected for the Pakistan national team at the 1964 Summer Olympics qualification in 1963, as left halfback alongside Abdul Ghafoor. In 1965, he toured Ceylon with the national team and featured at the inaugural 1965 RCD Cup. The next year, he featured in an unofficial friendly against FC Alga Bishkek from the Soviet Union, playing at the right halfback position alongside Maula Bakhsh Momin. In 1967 he also toured Afghanistan and played against Dallas Tornado during the club's worldwide tour, and later featured at the 1968 AFC Asian Cup qualification the same year.

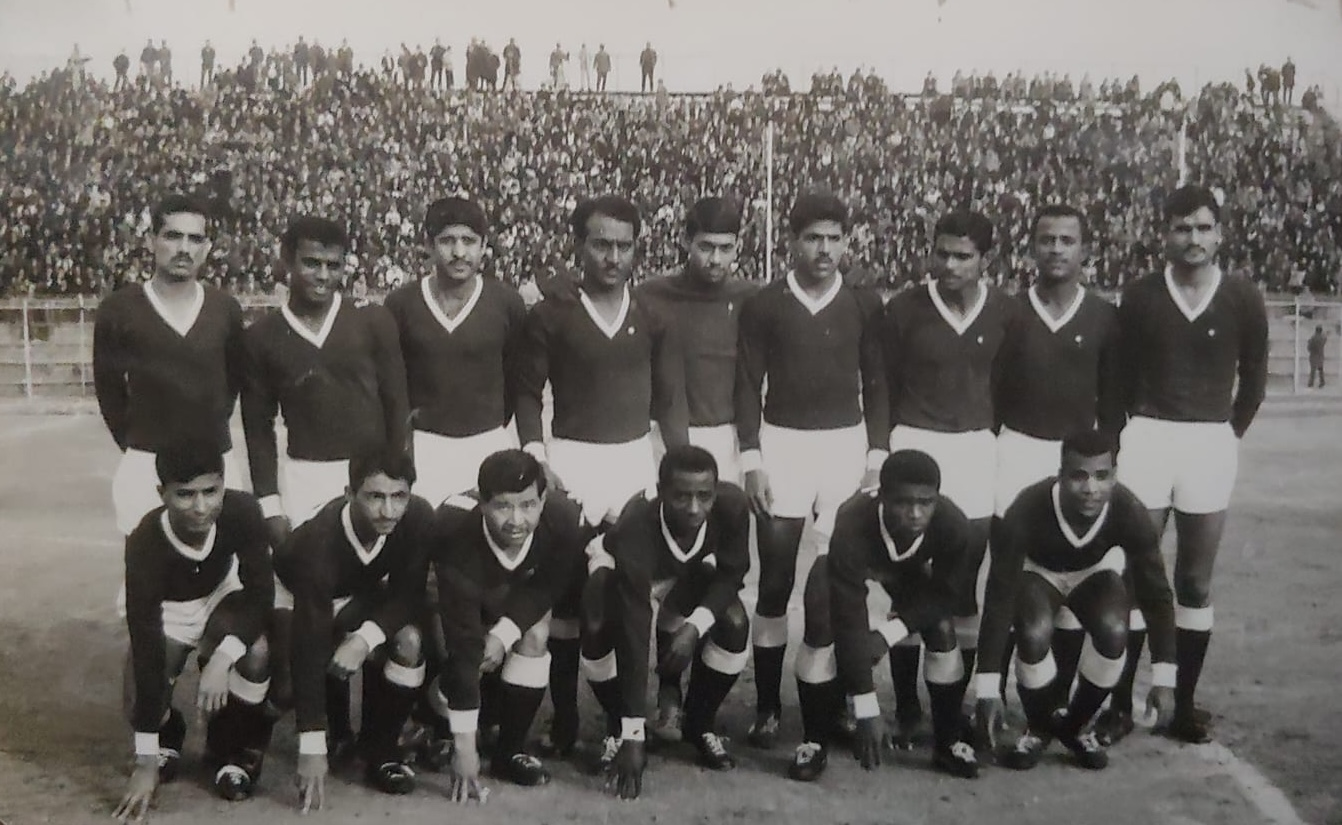
Rana standing fourth from left with the PFF XI team at the 1970 Friendship Cup

In 1969, he featured with the national team at the 1969 RCD Cup. In 1970, Rana was appointed as captain for the national side which competed under the name of Pakistan Football Federation XI for the 1970 Friendship Cup in Iran. Months later at the 1970 RCD Cup, Qadir Bakhsh replaced Rana as captain which also proved to be his last international tournament.

== Post-playing career ==
While playing, Younus also trained to become referee in 1971, and refereed several matches at the National Football Championship in the 1980s. From 1981 onwards, he turned his attention to coaching, and was coach of the Multan team that won the 1981 National Youth Championship under the captaincy of Sharafat Ali.

After earning the coaching diploma from German Bert Trautmann, Rana was appointed as head coach of the Pakistan national team in 1981. After leading the team at the 1981 King's Cup held in Thailand, Rana led the national team (named as Pakistan Greens) in the 1982 Quaid-e-Azam International Tournament and Bangladesh President Gold Cup the same year. In 1983, he coached the Pakistan national team for the matches against the touring Southwest German FA team. His second stint as national coach came in April 1987, during the 1988 Summer Olympics Asian Qualifiers. He later served as assistant coach of the national team following the 1987 Quaid-e-Azam International Tournament in September 1987 till 1989 under head coach Burkhard Ziese.

In 2003, Rana served as head coach of the PTCL departmental team at the last edition of the National Football Championship, and from 2004 onwards at the Pakistan Premier League.

== Honours ==
=== Pakistan Railways ===
- National Football Championship: 1969

== See also ==
- List of Pakistan national football team captains
