= Punjab Football Association (Pakistan) =

- Sport: Association football
- Jurisdiction: Punjab, Pakistan
- Abbreviation: PFA
- Affiliation: Pakistan Football Federation (PFF); Sports Board Punjab (SBP)
- President: Navid Aslam Khan Lodhi
- Vice president: Raja Muhammad Ishtiaq

The Punjab Football Association is the regional administrative governing body for association football in the Punjab province of Pakistan. It is affiliated with the Pakistan Football Federation.

== History ==
=== Origins and early years ===
During the British Raj, football in the Punjab and surrounding regions was governed by the North-West India Football Association since 1932.

After partition, the West Punjab Football Association came into existence after the formation of Pakistan. The last honorary secretary of the North-West India Football Association since 1942, Khawaja Riaz Ahmed, continued his position as honorary secretary in the newly formed West Punjab Football Association in Pakistan. It was later renamed as Punjab Football Association.

Historically, the association has been responsible for selecting and fielding the Punjab provincial football team in national tournaments, including the National Games of Pakistan and the National Football Championship.

=== Governance disputes and legal challenges (2015–2023) ===
Ahead of the PFF presidential elections in April 2015, internal political polarization split the PFA into rival parallel factions, each claiming legitimate authority over provincial football governance. This local impasse directly catalyzed a larger constitutional crisis within the national federation, drawing third-party intervention and multiple international suspensions from FIFA due to government and judicial interference in the sport's infrastructure.

The internal leadership struggle continued for several years. In May 2019, an extraordinary PFA Congress meeting in Lahore issued a five-year suspension against sitting president Naved Haider, an action later contested and declared invalid by rival PFF factions. Further electoral processes faced disruption in November 2020, when the Lahore High Court Bahawalpur Bench issued an injunction halting a scheduled provincial election organized by the FIFA-appointed Normalisation Committee, following petitions challenging structural mandates. Disagreements regarding the validity of various provincial election cycles persisted through 2023 amid active legal disputes between domestic stakeholders and the PFF NC.

=== Normalization and official SBP affiliation ===
Following an extensive restructuring phase led by the Normalisation Committee to resolve regional governance issues, formal democratic elections for the PFA were concluded in November 2024. Navid Aslam Khan Lodhi was elected president, with Raja Muhammad Ishtiaq securing the vice presidency.

The regulatory cycle concluded on 1 July 2026, when the Sports Board Punjab, the provincial government's official sports regulatory authority, formally granted affiliation to the PFA. The decision resolved a 16-month administrative delay linked to procedural election observations, allowing officially sanctioned regional leagues, school competitions, and infrastructure funding to legally resume across the province under the government's umbrella.

== Regional structure ==
In accordance with the constitution of the Pakistan Football Federation, the Punjab Football Association operates a decentralized governance model overseen by individual District Football Associations (DFAs) of all the districts of Punjab.

== See also ==
- Pakistan Football Federation
- Punjab football team (Pakistan)
- Sports Board Punjab
