= Burkhard Ziese =

German football manager

Personal information
- Full name: Burkhard Ziese
- Date of birth: 1 February 1944
- Place of birth: Germany
- Date of death: 19 April 2010 (aged 66)
- Place of death: Ruppichteroth, Germany

Managerial career
- Years: Team
- 1978–1980: Sudan
- 1985–1986: Thailand
- 1987–1989: Pakistan
- 1990–1992: Ghana
- 1994–1997: Bermuda
- 1997–1998: Zambia
- 2003: Ghana
- 2005–2006: Malawi

Burkhard Ziese (1 February 1944 – 19 April 2010) was a German football manager.

== Managerial career ==
After obtaining his coaching license, Ziese had stints in several developing nations such as Sudan, Thailand, Pakistan, Ghana and Bermuda.

Ziese was appointed as coach for the Pakistan national team following the 1987 Quaid-e-Azam International Tournament in September 1987, replacing Younus Rana who subsequently worked as assistant coach under him. In 1989, he was sacked and replaced by Tariq Lutfi who acted as caretaker manager two days before facing the United Arab Emirates at the second leg of the 1990 FIFA World Cup qualification in February 1989.

After coaching Zambia, he returned to Ghana in 2003.

Ziese managed Malawi during the 2008 Africa Cup of Nations qualifying round. In 2006, while managing Malawi, Ziese was brutally attacked by four security officials at the apparent direction of the general secretary of the Football Association of Malawi.

He work a time for NATO in Brussels and play 1968 by Tongerse SV Cercle three games and scored two goals in fourth division of Belgium.
