= Khalid Ahmed Kharal =

Pakistani politician (1939-2017)

Khalid Ahmed Khan Kharal was a Pakistani politician, belonging to the Lakhera Kharal clan based in Kot Kamal Khan, also known as Kamalia. He was born in 1939 in Kamalia and died on 27 August 2017.

== Political career ==
He served as a Federal Minister twice in the government of Prime Minister Benazir Bhutto in 1988-1990 and 1993-1996.

He joined the Central Superior Services of Pakistan as an Assistant Commissioner in 1963. He served in important positions such as Director Industries Department Punjab, Director Food Department Punjab, Deputy Commissioner and Political Agent in Dera Ghazi Khan, Deputy Commissioner Larkana and Commissioner Larkana when Zulfiqar Ali Bhutto was the Prime Minister.

He was considered a close confidant of Zulfiqar Ali Bhutto and Benazir Bhutto. He was imprisoned during Zia ul Haq's martial law to testify against Prime Minister Zulfiqar Ali Bhutto and upon his refusal he left the country in exile and joined the Government of Abu Dhabi as an Adviser on Economic Development. He lived in Abu Dhabi for 15 years.

He was elected as a Member of the National Assembly from the Kamalia constituency. He was considered a very influential person in his district. In 2007 he announced that his son, Haider Ali Khan Kharal would contest instead of him on a PPP ticket in the upcoming general elections.
