= Khyber Pakhtunkhwa football team =

Khyber Pakhtunkhwa
- Coat of arms of Khyber Pakhtunkhwa, often featured in the team kit
- Full name: Khyber Pakhtunkhwa football team
- Ground: Various
- Owner: Khyber Pakhtunkhwa Football Association
- League: National Games

The Khyber Pakhtunkhwa football team, earlier known as North-West Frontier Province till 2010, is a Pakistani football team representing Khyber Pakhtunkhwa in regional football competitions including the National Games of Pakistan. The team competed at the National Football Championship, the premier football competition of Pakistan from 1948 till 2003.

== History ==
The team competed at the National Football Championship, the premier football competition of Pakistan from 1948 till 2003, representing the North-West Frontier Province (NWFP). The team finished runner-ups three times in 1952, 1953, and 1955. On occasions, the team has played under different names, such as NWFP Blue in 1953. The team had services of several notable players of Pakistan such as Sumbal Khan.

In April 1952, during the Iran national team visit to Pakistan, NWFP played against the visitors in Peshawar, losing 2–4.

In 2010, the provincial teams including NWFP competed in the 2010 KPT-PFF Cup, a cup competition organised by the Pakistan Football Federation featuring provincial and departmental teams, similar to the previous National Championship.

== Squads ==
=== 1958 National Football Championship ===
- Fazlur Rehman, Farid Ahmed Shah, Bashir Ahmed, Muhammad Azam, Fazalur Rehman, Muhammad Rafiq, Aminuddin, Jalalabad, Muhammad Ashiq, Abdur Rehman, Sher Muhammad, Munawar Khan, Saad Baz, Aurangzeb, Abdul Latif, Sarfraz, Sabir, Sher Ahmed.

== Honours ==
- National Football Championship
  - Runners-up (3): 1952, 1953, 1955

== See also ==
- Punjab football team
- Balochistan football team
- Sindh football team
- East Pakistan football team
- Karachi football team
