= Pakistan national football team results =

The following are the Pakistan national football team results in its official international matches.
