= Balochistan football team =

Balochistan
- Coat of arms of Balochistan, often featured in the team kit
- Full name: Balochistan football team
- Ground: Various
- Owner: Balochistan Football Association
- League: National Games

The Balochistan football team is a Pakistani football team representing Balochistan in regional football competitions including the National Games of Pakistan. The team competed at the National Football Championship, the premier football competition of Pakistan from 1948 till 2003.

== History ==
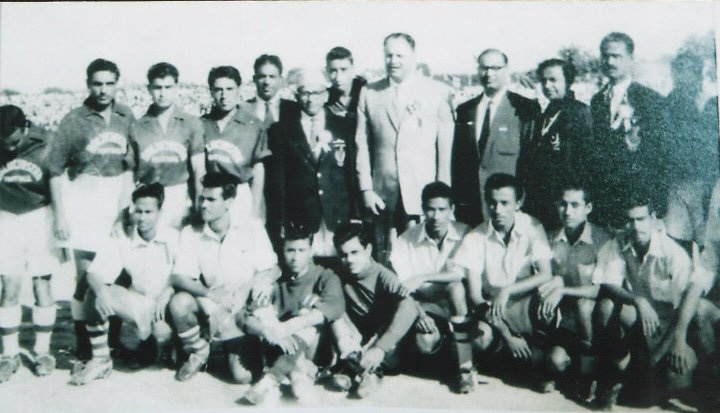
East Pakistan and Balochistan teams pictured at the 1959 National Football Championship final with Ayub Khan

The team competed at the National Football Championship, the premier football competition of Pakistan from 1948 till 2003. With 3 titles, Balochistan is the fifth most successful team of the competition. On occasions, the team has played under different names, such as Balochistan Red in 1950 and 1975. The team had services of several notable players of Pakistan such as Qayyum Changezi, Abdul Wahid Durrani, Taj Mohammad Sr., Taj Mohammad Jr., Muhammad Zaman Shah and Muhammad Ali Shah.

In April 1952, during the Iran national team visit to Pakistan, Balochistan played against the visitors in Quetta, losing 1–3.

At the National Games, the team has won one gold in 1986.

In 2010, the provincial teams including Balochistan competed in the 2010 KPT-PFF Cup, a cup competition organised by the Pakistan Football Federation featuring provincial and departmental teams, similar to the previous National Championship.

== Honours ==
- National Football Championship
  - Winners (3): 1950, 1956, 1959
  - Runners-up (1): 1975
- National Games
  - Gold medal (1): 1986
  - Silver medal (1): 2004

== See also ==
- Punjab football team
- Sindh football team
- Khyber Pakhtunkhwa football team
- East Pakistan football team
- Karachi football team
