= Punjab football team (Pakistan) =

Punjab
- Coat of arms of Punjab, often featured in the team kit
- Full name: Punjab football team
- Ground: Various
- Owner: Punjab Football Association
- League: National Games

The Punjab football team is a Pakistani football team representing Punjab in Pakistan regional football competitions including the National Games of Pakistan. The team competed at the National Football Championship, the premier football competition of Pakistan from 1948 till 2003.

== History ==
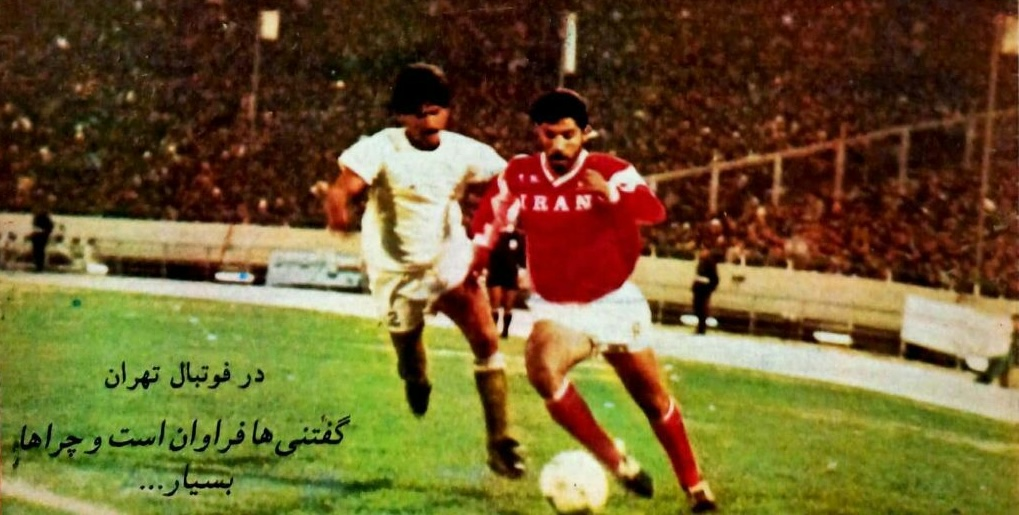
Punjab vs Persepolis at the 1990–91 Asian Cup Winners' Cup first leg in Azadi Stadium

The team competed at the National Football Championship, the premier football competition of Pakistan from 1948 till 2003. With 8 titles, Punjab is the second most successful team of the competition after Pakistan Airlines. On occasions, the team has played under different names, such as Punjab Blue in 1954 and 1958, Punjab A in 1975, or Punjab Red in 1989 and 1990.

In the early editions of the National Football Championship, the team participated under the name "West Punjab football team".

In April 1952, during the Iran national team visit to Pakistan, Punjab played against the visitors in Lahore, losing 1–3.

The team also competed in Asian competitions. At the 1989–90 Asian Club Championship, the team failed to get past the group stage. At the 1990–91 Asian Cup Winners' Cup, they lost in the first round against Persepolis in both legs.

At the National Games Football, the team has won two golds in 1990 and 1998. At the 1992 National Games, the team also competed with Punjab Reds as their name, while Punjab Greens comprised a separate selection composed mainly of players from Crescent Textile Mills football team.

In 2010, the provincial teams including Punjab competed in the 2010 KPT-PFF Cup, a cup competition organised by the Pakistan Football Federation featuring provincial and departmental teams, similar to the previous National Championship.

== Squads ==
=== 1951 National Football Championship ===
- Mohammad Yaqoob, Riasat Ali, Haroon, Niaz Ali, Aziz, Ibrahim, Aslam, Majid, Muhammad Sharif, S.A. Dara, Masood, G. M. Din, Abbas, lqbal, S. M. Akhtar, Ghulam Muhammad Sr., Ghulam Muhammad Jr., Munir, Malik, Masood Fakhri, Jamil Akhtar, Qadir, Iqbal, Saleem Akhtar.

=== 1955 National Football Championship ===
- S. A. Dara, Muhammad Abdul Malik, Fazal, Riasat Ali, Masood, Iqbal, Sabar, Shams-ud-Din, Talib Ali, Salam, Saif, Muhammad Hanif, Mazhar, Noor Ahmad.

=== 1956 National Football Championship ===
- S. A. Dara, Sharafuddin, Riasat Ali, Muhammad Abdul Malik, Sabir, Masood ul Hassan Butt, Iqbal, Nazir Ahmad, Talib Ali, Ateeq, Saif, Muhammad Hanif, Ghulam Rabbani, Abdul Salam, Niamat Ullah Durrani, Barkat, Jabbar.

=== 1957 National Football Championship ===
- Sharafuddin, S. A. Dara, Riasat Ali, Niamat Ullah Durrani, Muhammad Abdul Malik, Masood, Muhammad Nazir, Shaukat, Talib Ali, Mazhar, Saiful Huq, Muhammad Hanif, Ghulam Rabbani, Faqir Muhammad.

=== 1958 National Football Championship ===
- Sharafuddin; Axis; Iqbal, Salam, Saif, Rehman, Ghulam Rabbani, Ashiq Haider, Riasat Ali, Khushi Muhammad, Shaukat Muhammad, Nstair, Ghulam Sabir, Talib Ali, Atique, Ismail, Ghulam Rasul, Noor Muhammad, Yousaf, Inayet, Muhammad Hanif, and Aslam, Ibrahim, Ghulam Sabir.

=== 1959 National Football Championship ===
Coach: (Pakistan) Saeed Mirza

- Sharafuddin, Latif, Din Muhammad, S. A. Dara, Azizullah, Khushi Muhammad, Niamat Ullah Durrani, Anwar, Shaukat, Naseer, Waseem, Masood ul Hassan Butt, Noor Nazir, Ghulam Sabir, Shafiuddin, Khalid, Talib Ali, Sher Muhammad, Salam, Abid, Aziz, Khalid Butt, M.N. Jehan, Hamid, Hafizullah.

== Honours ==
- National Football Championship
  - Winners (8): 1952, 1953, 1954, 1955, 1957, 1958, 1989, 1990
  - Runners-up (1): 1975
- National Games
  - Gold medal (2): 1990, 1998
  - Silver medal (2): 1992, 2001

== Performance in AFC competitions ==
Win Draw Loss

Season	Competition	Round	Club	First leg	Second leg	Aggregate
1989–90	Asian Club Championship	Group stage	(Oman) Fanja	0–2		
1989–90	Asian Club Championship	Group stage	(India) Salgaocar	0–0		
1989–90	Asian Club Championship	Group stage	(Nepal) Kathmandu SC	1–1		
1990–91	Asian Cup Winners' Cup	First Round	(Iran) Persepolis	0–9		
1990–91	Asian Cup Winners' Cup	First Round	(Iran) Persepolis	2–4		

== See also ==
- Sindh football team
- Khyber Pakhtunkhwa football team
- Balochistan football team
- East Pakistan football team
- Karachi football team
