= Pir Shah Jewna =

16th-century Sufi saint (1493–1569)

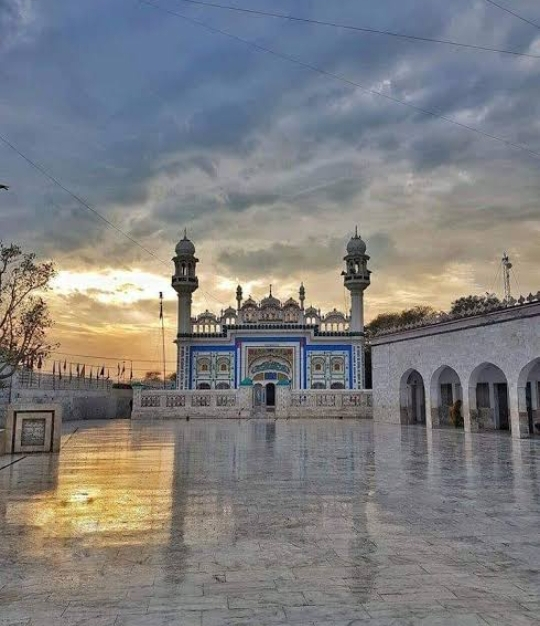
Shah Jewna Shrine, Jhang District Pakistan

Shah Jewna, also known as Pir Shah Jewna Mahboob Alam Naqvi Al-Bukhari, was a 15th-century saint and a Naqvi Sayyid. Born in Kannauj in 895 A.H. (1493 A.D.), he was a direct descendant of Jalaluddin Surkh-Posh Bukhari, Jewna’s father Sayyed Sadruddin Shah Kabir Naqvi Al Bukhari was the chief advisor of King Sikandar Lodi.

After the death of Makhdoom Jahanian Jahangast, the ancestors of Shah Jewna had moved to Kannauj. Jewna migrated from Kannauj to Shah Jeewna (a town named after him), which was deserted until he settled there. Makhdoom Jahanian Mosque is still present in Kannauj. Shah Jewna رحمه الله died in the year 971 A.H. (1569) during the reign of the Mughal Emperor Jalal-ud-din Akbar. Jewna's descendants are still present in various places of India and Pakistan.
