= Faisal Saleh Hayat =

Pakistani politician

Minister of Interior
- In office 23 November 2002 – 25 August 2004
- Prime Minister: Zafarullah Khan Jamali; Shujaat Hussain
- Preceded by: Moinuddin Haider
- Succeeded by: Aftab Ahmad Sherpao

Minister of Commerce
- In office 2 December 1988 – 6 August 1990
- Prime Minister: Benazir Bhutto
- Preceded by: Praful Patel

Personal details
- Born: Makhdoom Syed Faisal Saleh Hayat; 21 July 1952 (age 74) Lahore, Punjab, Pakistan
- Party: PMLN (2023-present)
- Other political affiliations: IND (2022-2023); PPP (2018–2022); IND (2015-2018); PML(Q) (2002–2013); PPP (1988–2002); IJI (1985-1988)
- Spouse: Khalida Riyasat (m. 1984–1996)
- Relations: Khalid Ahmed Kharal (uncle); Syed Zulfiqar Bokhari (cousin)

Makhdoom Syed Faisal Saleh Hayat (Urdu: مخدوم سيد فیصل صالح حیات; born 21 July 1952) is a Pakistani politician from Jhang, Punjab and sports administrator.

== Early life and education ==
Born into a feudal Shi'a family, Hayat is the alleged Sajjada Nashin (lineal descendant and successor) of Pir Shah Jewna, a famous 16th century Sufi saint whose shrine in Jhang District, Punjab, Pakistan, is revered by millions. This spiritual title apart from land he owned was crucial for him to initially draw his wealth and political power.

He was introduced to politics by his maternal uncle Khalid Ahmed Kharal, a bureaucrat who worked with Zulfikar Ali Bhutto, while his other relatives who have been active in politics include Abida Hussain and Syed Zulfiqar Bokhari.

Hayat did his early education from FC College University, Lahore, and later earned a master's degree in law and a diploma in business administration from King's College London.

== Political career ==
Hayat was elected as Member of National Assembly of Pakistan for the terms of 1977–77, 1988–1990, 1990–1993, 1993–1996, 2002–2007 and 2008–2012.

In 1979, he was made member of the Central Executive Committee of the PPP. In the 1990 election, his brother Asad Hayat was also elected member of National Assembly from NA-86 Jhang.

Makhdoom Syed Faisal Saleh Hayat served as a member of Central Executive Committee of PPP in 1979. In 2002, he was elected MNA on a PPP ticket, later forming PPP-Patriots and then joining PML-Q. He served as Federal Minister in numerous Ministries which include Commerce (1988–90), Environment, Housing and Works, Interior (2002–04), and Kashmir Affairs. In 2013, his nomination papers were rejected on the charges of stealing irrigation water.

In 2005, Makhdoom group by him was the largest group for the Nazim and councillor seats with 130 seats. Zahoor Ahmed Sajid contributed with seven seats and faced very little opposition.

== Administration career ==
=== Football ===
Hayat is a former President of the Pakistan Football Federation and had been in helm of the office for nearly two decades, from 2003 till 2017. He has been described as a "feudal lord of Pakistani football" due to his controversial tenure, incompetence and fund embezzlement.

Despite having no real connection to the sport, Hayat first assumed control in 2003. Deeply embedded in Pakistan’s political elite, Hayat used his influence and connections with the new military dictatorship in power, who he jumped ship to after abandoning his own party. The elections that brought him into the PFF also saw accusations that Pakistan’s military spy agencies helped him win.

Under Hayat’s leadership in the ensuing years, Pakistan's football rankings continued to nosedive, from 168th in 2003 to 201st in 2017. Despite millions of dollars in funding from FIFA and the AFC, intended to develop the sport in Pakistan, very little progress was made. Projects promised under FIFA’s Goal Project initiative mostly remained unfulfilled, with only one of the planned eight facilities being constructed. Hayat, however, thrived personally, securing influential positions within the AFC and FIFA, and forging close ties with powerful Gulf leaders. These relationships benefited him greatly, with the AFC covering his legal expenses and funnelling substantial funds into projects that never materialized.

Hayat's unpopularity grew even within his former allies, particularly after a controversial PFF election in 2015, which at one point Hayat held in his own home. The fallout from these polls led to remade loyalties within the PFF as well as several lawsuits. After two years of inaction, FIFA intervened and placed a six-month suspension on the federation in 2017. After two controversial years, a new set of elections under the Supreme Court of Pakistan made Ashfaq Hussain Shah the new president, ending Hayat's long lasting tenure. This caused a serious breakdown as Hayat refused to accept the results. Eventually, FIFA stepped in again in 2019 to appoint a normalisation committee.

== Personal life ==
In May 2017, Faisal Saleh Hayat was injured in a road accident on the M-4 motorway near Faisalabad when his car was hit by a truck.
