= Football at the National Games of Pakistan =

- Founded: Men: 1982; Women: 2012
- Region: Pakistan
- Current champions: M: Pakistan Air Force; W: Pakistan Army (2025)
- Most championships: M: Pakistan Army (5 titles); W: Pakistan Army (2 titles)
- 2025

Football has been a sport at the National Games of Pakistan since 1982, while the women's tournament was introduced in 2012. It comprises various disciplines in which sportsmen from the provinces and departments of Pakistan compete against each other. The winners get awarded the Quaid-e-Azam Shield.

Pakistan Army is currently the most successful team in the men's category with five gold medals, while Pakistan Army is the most successful women's team with two gold medals.

== Results ==
=== Men's tournament ===
Year	Host	Final			Third Place Match		
Year	Host	(gold) Gold	Score	(silver) Silver	(bronze) Bronze	Score	Fourth Place
1982	Peshawar	Pakistan Air Force	−	−	−	−	−
1986	Quetta	Balochistan	−	−	−	–	−
1990	Nowshera	Punjab	−	−	−	–	−
1992	Lahore	WAPDA	2−0	Punjab Reds	Punjab Greens (Note: Title holders Punjab entered the competition as Punjab Reds, while Punjab Greens was a separate selection composed mainly of players from Crescent Textile Mills football team.)	2−0	NWFP
1995	Quetta	Pakistan Army	−	−	−	–	–
1997	Karachi	Pakistan Army	−	−	−	−	−
1998	Peshawar	Punjab	−	−	−	−	−
2001	Lahore	Pakistan Army	−	Punjab	WAPDA	−	Pakistan Navy
2004	Quetta	Pakistan Army	2−0	Balochistan	−	−	−
2007	Karachi	Pakistan Army	0−0 (7−6 p)	Sindh	WAPDA	−	Punjab
2010	Islamabad	WAPDA	1−0	Pakistan Air Force	Pakistan Navy	0−0 (4−2 p)	Pakistan Army
2012	Lahore	WAPDA	4−0	Pakistan Police	Punjab	None (Note: The 2012 men’s tournament was played as a three-team single-league competition.)	
2013	Islamabad	Football not held			Football not held		
2019	Peshawar	Football not held			Football not held		
2023	Quetta	Pakistan Police	3−0	Pakistan Air Force	Balochistan	0−0 (4−3 p)	Pakistan Army
2025	Karachi	Pakistan Air Force	1−0	Pakistan Army	WAPDA	4−0	Pakistan Navy

=== Women's tournament ===
Year	Host	Final			Third Place Match		
Year	Host	(gold) Gold	Score	(silver) Silver	(bronze) Bronze	Score	Fourth Place
2012	Lahore	Punjab	1−0	WAPDA	Higher Education Commission	−	−
2013	Islamabad	Football not held			Football not held		
2019	Peshawar	Football not held			Football not held		
2023	Quetta	Pakistan Army	4−3	WAPDA	Higher Education Commission	−	−
2025	Karachi	Pakistan Army	1−0	WAPDA	Sindh	12−0	Khyber Pakktunkhwa

== Medal table ==
=== Men's ===
Team	Gold	Silver	Bronze
Pakistan Army	5 (1995, 1997, 2001, 2004, 2007)	1 (2025)	−
WAPDA	3 (1992, 2010, 2012)	1 (1992)	3 (2001, 2007, 2025)
Punjab	2 (1990, 1998)	2 (1992, 2001)	1 (2012)
Pakistan Air Force	2 (1982, 2025)	2 (2010, 2023)	−
Balochistan	1 (1986)	1 (2004)	1 (2023)
Pakistan Police	1 (2023)	1 (2012)	−
Sindh	−	1 (2007)	−
Punjab Greens	−	−	1 (1992)
Pakistan Navy	−	−	1 (2010)

Note: Silver medallists of the 1982, 1986, 1990, 1995, 1997, 1998 editions, and Bronze medallists of the 1982, 1986, 1990, 1995, 1997, 1998, 2004 editions are unknown

=== Women's ===
Team	Gold	Silver	Bronze
Pakistan Army	2 (2023, 2025)	0	0
Punjab	1 (2012)	0	0
WAPDA	0	2 (2012, 2023)	1 (2025)
Higher Education Commission	0	0	2 (2012, 2023)
Sindh	0	0	1 (2025)

== See also ==
- National Football Championship
