= 1992–93 Asian Club Championship =

12th edition of premier club football tournament organized by the AFC

1992–1993 Asian Club Championship
Tournament details
- Dates: January 1992 – January 1993
- Teams: 18

Final positions
- Champions: (Iran) PAS Tehran (1st title)
- Runners-up: (Saudi Arabia) Al-Shabab
- Third place: (United Arab Emirates) Al-Wasl
- Fourth place: (Japan) Yomiuri FC

Tournament statistics
- Matches played: 23
- Goals scored: 72 (3.13 per match)

The 1992–93 Asian Club Championship was the 12th edition of the annual international club football competition held in the AFC region (Asia). It determined that year's club champion of association football in Asia.

PAS Tehran of Iran won the final and become Asian champions for the first time.

== First round ==
=== East Asia ===
Team 1	Agg.	Team 2	1st leg	2nd leg
Arseto Solo (Indonesia)	3–2	(Vietnam) Hải Quan	0–0	3–2
PKNK (Malaysia)	2–6	(Brunei) Kota Ranger	1–1	1–5

- No other results from preliminary rounds known

== Second round ==
=== East Asia ===
Team 1	Agg.	Team 2	1st leg	2nd leg
Arseto Solo (Indonesia)	3–2	(Brunei) Kota Ranger FC	1–1	2–1

- No other results from preliminary rounds known

=== West Asia ===
Team 1	Agg.	Team 2	1st leg	2nd leg
Club Valencia (Maldives)	4–7	(Pakistan) Wohaib	2–1	2–6

- No other results from preliminary rounds known

== Third round ==
=== East Asia ===
Team 1	Agg.	Team 2	1st leg	2nd leg
Thai Farmers Bank FC (Thailand)	2–3	(Indonesia) Arseto Solo	2–0	0–3
Liaoning FC (China)	4–4 (a)	(Japan) Yomiuri FC	3–3	1–1

- No other results from preliminary rounds known

=== West Asia ===
Team 1	Agg.	Team 2	1st leg	2nd leg
Al Arabi (Qatar)	3–4	(Iran) PAS Tehran	3–2	0–2
Al-Ansar (Lebanon)	3–5	(Bahrain) Al-Muharraq	1–1	2–4
Al-Wehdat (Jordan)	1–7	(United Arab Emirates) Al-Wasl	0–4	1–3
Qadsia (Kuwait)	3–3 (a)	(Saudi Arabia) Al-Shabab	1–3	2–0
Brothers Union (Bangladesh)	0–2	(Pakistan) Wohaib	0–0	0–2

- No other results from preliminary rounds known

== Group stage ==
=== Group A ===
Pos	Team	Pld	W	D	L	GF	GA	GD	Pts	Qualification
1	(Japan) Yomiuri FC	3	2	1	0	5	0	+5	5	Advance to Semi-finals
2	(Saudi Arabia) Al-Shabab	3	1	2	0	4	1	+3	4	Advance to Semi-finals
3	(Bahrain) Muharraq Club	3	1	1	1	4	3	+1	3	
4	(Indonesia) Arseto Solo	3	0	0	3	0	9	−9	0	

Source: RSSSF
January 1993

Yomiuri FC (Japan)	0–0	(Saudi Arabia) Al-Shabab

January 1993

Yomiuri FC (Japan)	2–0	(Bahrain) Muharraq Club

January 1993

Yomiuri FC (Japan)	3–0	(Indonesia) Arseto Solo

January 1993

Al-Shabab (Saudi Arabia)	1–1	(Bahrain) Muharraq Club

January 1993

Al-Shabab (Saudi Arabia)	3–0	(Indonesia) Arseto Solo

January 1993

Muharraq Club (Bahrain)	3–0	(Indonesia) Arseto Solo

=== Group B ===
Pos	Team	Pld	W	D	L	GF	GA	GD	Pts	Qualification
1	(United Arab Emirates) Al-Wasl	2	2	0	0	11	0	+11	4	Advance to Semi-finals
2	(Iran) PAS Tehran	2	0	1	1	1	2	−1	1	Advance to Semi-finals
3	(Pakistan) Wohaib FC	2	0	1	1	1	11	−10	1	

Source: RSSSF
13 January 1993

Al-Wasl (United Arab Emirates)	1–0	(Iran) PAS Tehran
	Report

Bahrain
15 January 1993

Al-Wasl (United Arab Emirates)	10–0 (Note: RSSSF misreported the scoreline as 10–1)	(Pakistan) Wohaib

Bahrain
17 January 1993

PAS Tehran (Iran)	1–1	(Pakistan) Wohaib
Mohsen Garousi 3'	Report	Tanveer ul Hasnain 75'

Bahrain

== Knockout Stage ==
=== Bracket ===
Semi-finals
20 January – Riffa
(Japan) Yomiuri FC	1
(Iran) PAS Tehran (a.e.t.)	2
20 January – Riffa
(United Arab Emirates) Al-Wasl	2 (3)
(Saudi Arabia) Al-Shabab (p)	2 (4)

Final
22 January – Riffa
(Iran) PAS Tehran	1
(Saudi Arabia) Al-Shabab	0
Third place play-off
22 January – Riffa
(Japan) Yomiuri FC	3
(United Arab Emirates) Al-Wasl	4

=== Semi-final ===
19 January 1993

Yomiuri FC (Japan)	1–2 (a.e.t.)	(Iran) PAS Tehran
	Report	Ali Asghar Modir Roosta; Alireza Hakimzadeh

Bahrain

19 January 1993

Al-Wasl (United Arab Emirates)	2–2 (a.e.t.)	(Saudi Arabia) Al-Shabab
Penalties
	3–4

Bahrain
Referee: Ghazi Al-Kendi (Kuwait)

=== Third Place ===
22 January 1993

Yomiuri FC (Japan)	3–4	(United Arab Emirates) Al-Wasl

Bahrain

=== Final ===
22 January 1993

PAS Tehran (Iran)	1–0	(Saudi Arabia) Al-Shabab
Mohsen Garousi 39'	Report

Bahrain National Stadium, Riffa
Referee: Pirom Un-Prasert (Thailand)
