= John McBride (footballer) =

Scottish footballer and manager

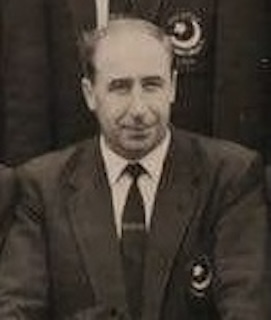
- McBride in 1959

Personal information
- Date of birth: 31 December 1923
- Place of birth: Kilsyth, Scotland
- Position: Goalkeeper

Senior career*
Years	Team	Apps	(Gls)
1941–1948	Third Lanark		
1948–1952	Reading	100	(0)
1952–1955	Shrewsbury Town	78	(0)
1959	Aberdeen	3	(0)

Managerial career
- 1957–1959: Pakistan
- 1959–1961: Al Ahly
- * Club domestic league appearances and goals

John McBride (born 31 December 1923) was a Scottish professional footballer and football manager. McBride played as a goalkeeper for Reading and Shrewsbury Town, and also served as head coach of the Pakistan national team between 1957 and 1959.

== Playing career ==
McBride started his career on 12 September 1941 at Glasgow club Third Lanark. He signed for Reading in March 1948, and played until and 1953 making a total of 106 appearances throughout various competitions. During his spell there he became a fully-qualified physiotherapist and took all the top FA coaching certificates. He later featured for Shrewsbury Town between 1952 and 1955. He also served as player-coach of the club in 1954.

After coaching Pakistan, he returned to Scotland in August 1959 when he was on holidays in his wife's native city Aberdeen, playing for Aberdeen where he made 3 appearances. He volunteered to play for a month before leaving to work in Egypt as coach for Al Ahly of Cairo.

== Coaching career ==
Along with his playing career, McBride served simultaneously as coach of the British Army Western Command Sports Board and in schools in Shropshire.

On 10 October 1957 at the age of 33, McBride was signed as coach for the Pakistan national team on a two-year contract. He took his international team position after being dissatisfied by the contract offered by his playing team Shrewsbury Town.

He served as head coach for the 1958 Asian Games, although it is unclear if he ultimately travelled to Tokyo for the Asian Games with the contingent team. McBride culminated his coaching tenure with the national team after a tour to Burma in April 1959.

== Refereeing career ==
During his time in Pakistan, McBride also officiated matches at the 1958 Aga Khan Gold Cup.
