= Pakistan Football Federation =

Governing body of football in Pakistan

AFC
- Short name: PFF
- Founded: 5 December 1947; 78 years ago
- Headquarters: FIFA House Lahore
- Membership: 7 (Provincial associations including Islamabad Football Association)
- FIFA affiliation: 1948
- AFC affiliation: 1954
- SAFF affiliation: 1997
- President: Mohsen Gilani
- Vice-President: Naveed Aslam Khan Lodhi; Hafiz Zakaullah; Dr. Mohammad Ali
- Website: www.pff.com.pk

The Pakistan Football Federation (PFF) is the national governing body of association football in Pakistan. It is a member of FIFA, the international governing body of football, and affiliated to the Asian Football Confederation and South Asian Football Federation. The federation was founded in 1947; it also manages the futsal and beach soccer national teams.

== History ==
One of the regional federations to organise football in what is now Pakistan Territory was the North-West India Football Association, established in 1932 and reportedly encompassing football control in Punjab, NWFP, Sindh and Balochistan.

Thus, on 5 December 1947 the Pakistan Football Federation was created. Mohammad Ali Jinnah, Pakistan's first Governor-General, became the patron-in-chief, and in 1948, the PFF became affiliated with FIFA. It was also one of the founding members of the Asian Football Confederation in 1954.

Despite the federation's headquarters being officially relocated between different cities, it reportedly lacked a permanent office for much of its early history. The federation's affairs were instead administered without a fixed office, with successive officials conducting its business from wherever they were based. In March 1966, reportedly the headquarters of the Pakistan Football Federation was shifted to Rawalpindi from Peshawar. On 6 May 1969, it was reportedly shifted to Lahore.

In 1976, during the presidency of Abdul Sattar Gabol, the foundations of Football House were laid in Lyari, Karachi. The federation's administrative work was subsequently conducted from Football House, which functioned as the PFF headquarters.

In 2004, FIFA House Lahore replaced the Football House of Lyari as PFF headquarters.

== Controversies and suspensions ==
Since inception, the Pakistan Football Federation has been accused of several corruption scandals and incompetence in running the day-to-day footballing activities in Pakistan.

=== Early administrative dispute ===
In 1948, shortly after the establishment of the Pakistan Football Federation, a dispute emerged over the control of football in the country. Two rival organisations emerged, each claiming to be the supreme governing body for football in Pakistan. The PFF had secured recognition from the international football governing body, while the newly established Pakistan Olympic Association sought to centralise the administration of various sports under its own committees. The PFF refused to recognise the Olympic association's authority over football. Amid the dispute, the federation held a representative meeting in Karachi in which its president, Major Khurshid Anwar, was removed and replaced by Sardar Abdur Rab Nishtar, then the federal Minister for Communications.

=== 1968 brief suspension ===
On 19 September 1968, FIFA suspended PFF due to non-payment of Annual affiliation fees. The suspension was lifted on 28 September 1968, after the delayed payment of the fees.

=== Factionalism in the 1970s ===
Factionalism within Pakistani football administration was also reported during the 1970s. In 1976, football administration was divided between two groups representing Lahore and Islamabad. The two factions were primarily concerned with gaining control of football administration.

=== 1990s political hotbed ===
Pakistani football became a hot bed for politics in the late 1980s and early 1990s. In 1989, FIFA called to hold new elections after conducting an in-depth investigation in Pakistan. Atta Mohammad Pathan, a member of the Pakistan Peoples Party, with the backing of key political figures, opposed the incumbent PFF president Aftab Ahmad Khan Sherpao, who was also affiliated with the same party at the time. Benazir Bhutto, the leader of Pakistan Peoples Party, directed Sherpao to dissolve the Pakistan Football Federation Congress, but instead, Sherpao chose to step down. Wasim Sajjad, the former Senate Chairman, was appointed as the interim president of the PFF.

In 1990, Pakistan Football Federation held its general elections in which Mian Muhammad Azhar won the presidency by a margin of one vote, beating the Pakistan Peoples Party leader Faisal Saleh Hayat. Azhar later ousted PFF General Secretary Hafiz Salman Butt (a Member of National Assembly of Jamaat-e-Islami) in 1994 due to political rifts and alleged abuse of power. The division between the two factions split the PFF into rival groups. Each side sent its own youth teams to compete in the 1994 AFC Youth Championship, which resulted in a FIFA-imposed ban on the PFF. Azhar leveraged his position as president to gain FIFA's support and secure a ban on Salman from the PFF, though Salman consistently denied that FIFA had imposed a lifetime ban on him. FIFA's involvement in 1994 led to new elections for the PFF, where Azhar faced a challenge from Faisal Saleh Hayat, who was supported by Hafiz Salman. However, Azhar narrowly won by a single vote, maintaining his presidency, and went on to secure a third consecutive term in 1999.

Azhar governed the federation till the 2003 elections, when he was beaten by Hayat, who was supported by Butt. By that time, Azhar had fallen out of favour from the pro-Musharraf PML-Q while Hayat’s own pro-Musharraf PPP faction had been growing in power in the run-up to the 2002 General Elections after which he became the Interior Minister of Pakistan.

=== Faisal Saleh Hayat term ===
In August 2003, the PFF became under new management, as the politician Faisal Saleh Hayat won the elections unopposed, backed by Hafiz Salman Butt and Pakistan’s political and military elite. He has been described as a "feudal lord of Pakistani football". During his controversial tenure, Pakistan's FIFA ranking dropped from 168 in 2003 to 201 in 2017. The top division of the Pakistan Premier League also remained suspended because the crisis created due to his actions, along with the men's senior team, who remained suspended from any international competition since March 2015, and FIFA rankings of the senior team had slumped while the women football team is improving

=== 2015–2017 crisis ===
Just before the 2015 PFF elections, internal conflict arose, leading FIFA to demand resolution with AFC's involvement. In June 2015, 18 of the 26 PFF members voted to dismiss Faisal Saleh Hayat for incompetence and embezzlement. The conflict began with the Punjab Football Association, where Hayat-backed Sardar Naveed Haider Khan ousted incumbent Arshad Khan Lodhi, banning several of Lodhi's voters through an illegal disciplinary committee. This led vice-president Zahir Ali Shah to oppose Hayat and run for PFF presidency, alleging that Hayat altered the PFF constitution for his benefit.

The PFF eventually split into two groups following an Extraordinary Congress meeting that suspended Hayat. With the election approaching, the two factions announced their own election venues. The Lahore High Court was forced to intervene in and ordered a stay on polling and appointed a temporary administrator until matters were resolved between the two factions. On 30 June, the elections were declared null by Lahore High Court, attended by AFC observer, Sanjeevan Balasinggam. The PFF chairman Faisal Saleh Hayat said that the "Elections were approved by AFC, but the Asian governing body had no comment on the situation." The row intensified when the Hayat faction went on and held election anyway, disobeying the Lahore High Court stay order. FIFA then intervened and sent a fact-finding mission. They concluded that Hayat be given a mandate for two years, in which he would have to amend PFF statutes and form an independent disciplinary committee before holding elections again.

The Lahore High Court appointed administrator Asad Munir was given authority to manage football activity in Pakistan, while the two factions sorted out differences. Hayat's faction withdrew Pakistan from the 2015 SAFF Cup, only causing more resentment from football fans and senior PFF members who were intent on seeing Hayat removed from office.

By October 2016, FIFA withheld development funding from PFF due to the ongoing issues. In February 2017, the Lahore High Court reinstated Hayat as PFF president, with FIFA giving him until September 2017 to revise statutes and organize new elections.

=== 2017 FIFA suspension ===
In July 2017, FIFA threatened to suspend the PFF's membership if it kept refusing to hand football affairs to its president-elect Faisal Saleh Hayat. Former coach Nasir Ismail also asked FIFA to hold fresh elections for the PFF's presidency.

On 10 October 2017, FIFA suspended PFF with immediate effect due to third-party interference, which constitutes a serious violation of the FIFA statutes. On 13 March 2018 FIFA lifted the suspension, and Pakistan had been given the opportunity to participate in the 2018 Asian Games and the 2018 SAFF competitions.

=== 2018 Supreme Court elections ===
The situation deteriorated by December 2018 as the Supreme Court of Pakistan ordered PFF elections, where Syed Ashfaq Hussain Shah was elected as the PFF chief, albeit to Fifa’s wrath for this being third-party interference again.

Karachi United former captain Humza Khan was appointed as Normalization Committee for the Pakistan Football Federation in September 2019, whose task was to hold elections of the country's football governing body and bring it would bring an end to a four-year crisis that resulted in Pakistan suffering significantly in the game. However he resigned from the post in December 2020, and was replaced by interim Munir Ahmad Khan Sadhana as chairman of the PFF Normalisation Committee, after failing to hold the PFF elections by the June 2020 deadline. Its mandate was extended for six months until the end of the year. In January 2021, FIFA appointed Pakistani Canadian Haroon Malik as new chairman of the Pakistan Football Federation Normalisation Committee.

=== 2021 crisis and suspension ===
On 27 March 2021, the PFF's office was attacked and people inside held hostage by its former president, Syed Ashfaq Hussain Shah, and his group, and the ongoing women's championship was cancelled.

On 7 April 2021, FIFA suspended the federation with immediate effect due to third-party interference, which constitutes a serious violation of the FIFA statutes. The suspension was lifted on 29 June 2022.

=== 2025 suspension ===
On 6 February 2025, the federation was again suspended by FIFA due to failing to adopt a version of the PFF constitution approved by FIFA and the AFC that would have guaranteed fair elections. The suspension was lifted on 2 March 2025 after the PFF agreed to adopt the FIFA and AFC approved constitution.

== Logo ==
Logo of PFF (1990s–2003)

Logo of PFF (2003–2008)

Logo of PFF (2008–2025)

== Competitions ==
=== Men's competitions ===
Competitions currently run by PFF:

Competition	First season	Remarks
Pakistan Premier League	2004	The country's top-tier football league.
National Challenge Cup	1979	The country's national cup competition.
PFF League	2004	The country's 2nd tier football league.
National Club Championship	2006	The country's 3rd tier football league.
National U-19 Football Championship	1964	The country's U-19 football tournament.

=== Women's competitions ===
Competitions currently run by PFF:

Competition	First season	Remarks
National Women Football Championship	2005	The country's women's football tournament.
PFF National Under-19 Women’s Football Championship	N/A	U-19 Women's football tournament.
Shahlyla Baloch National Women U-16 Championship	2014	U-16 Women's football tournament.

=== Defunct ===
Competitions previously run by PFF:

Competition	First season	Last season	Remarks
Quaid-e-Azam International Tournament	1976	1987	International football tournament.
President's Gold Cup International Tournament	1986	1986	International football tournament.
National Football Championship	1948	2003	Men's top tier regional and institutional cup tournament.
National A-Division Football Championship	1992	1994	The country's first national league.
National B-Division Football Championship	1992	1994	The country's first 2nd tier national league.
Super Football League	2007	2010	The country's first franchise league.
KPT-PFF Cup	2010	2010	Cup for departmental and provincial teams.

== National teams ==
=== Men ===
- Pakistan national football team
- Pakistan national football B team
- Pakistan national under-23 football team
- Pakistan national under-20 football team
- Pakistan national under-17 football team
- Pakistan national futsal team
- Pakistan national beach soccer team

=== Women ===
- Pakistan women's national football team
- Pakistan women's national under-20 football team
- Pakistan women's national under-17 football team
- Pakistan women's national futsal team

== Affiliated federations ==
There are currently seven provincial associations affiliated with the PFF

- Islamabad Football Association
- Punjab Football Association
- Sindh Football Association
- Balochistan Football Association
- Khyber Pakhtunkhwa Football Association
- Azad Kashmir Football Association
- Gilgit-Baltistan Football Association

== Board of directors ==
The following are on the board of the directors at the PFF.

Name	Position	ref
(Pakistan) Mohsen Gilani	President	
(Pakistan) Naveed Aslam Khan Lodhi (Pakistan) Hafiz Zakaullah (Pakistan) Dr. Mohammad Ali	Vice-presidents	
(vacant)	General Secretary	
(Pakistan) Shahid Niaz Khokhar	Chief Operating Officer	
(Pakistan) Adeel Rizki	Technical Director	
(Pakistan) Umaid Wasim	Director Media	
(Peru) Nolberto Solano	Head Coach (Senior Men's)	
(Argentina) Jorge Castañeira	Fitness coach (Senior Men's)	
(vacant)	Head Coach (Senior Women's)	
(Pakistan) Muhammad Raza Fazli	Director of Futsal	
(Pakistan) Khurram Shahzad	Referee Coordinator	
(Iran) Fatemeh Sharif	Head Coach (Senior Women's Futsal)	
(Iran) Ali Imani	Head Coach (Senior Men's Futsal)	

== Past office bearers ==
=== Presidents ===
President	Term	Ref.
Muhammad Ali Jinnah (Patron-in-Chief)	1948	
Fazlur Rahman	1948 – 1949	
Major Khurshid Anwar	1948 – 1949	
Khawaja Shahabuddin	1950 – 1951	
Dr. A. M. Malik	1952 – 1958	
Muhammad Sharif Khan	1956 – 1958	
Ataur Rahman	1958 – 1960	
Justice Abdus Sattar	1960 – 1961	
Air Marshal Asghar Khan	1961 – 1965	
Khan Abdus Sabur	1965 – 1972	
Abdul Sattar Gabol	1972 – 1977	
Justice Fida Muhammad Khan	1978 – 1981	
General Fazle Haq	1981 – 1988	
Aftab Ahmad Khan Sherpao	1988 – 1989	
Wasim Sajjad	1989	
Mian Muhammad Azhar	1990 – 2003	
Faisal Saleh Hayat	2003 – 2019 (Note: In 2018, Ashfaq Hussain Shah was elected by the Supreme Court of Pakistan to run the PFF, but his election was not recognised by FIFA.)	
Mohsen Gilani	2025 – present	

=== General secretaries ===
General Secretary	Term	Ref.
Unknown	1948 – 1964	
Maj. Malik Muhammad Hussain	1965 – 1977	
Unknown	1978 – 1989	
Hafiz Salman Butt	1990 – 1994	
Ghulam Abbas Baloch	1995 – 1999	
Agha Syed Liaqat Ali	1999 – 2003	
Muhammad Arshad Khan Lodhi	2003 – 2007	
Ahmed Yar Khan Lodhi	2007 – 2019	
Mujahid Tareen (Acting)	2019	
Haris Jamil Alam Khan (Acting)	2019 – 2020	
Manizeh Zainli	2020 – 2021	
Muhammad Shahid Niaz Khokhar (Acting)	2025	

=== Normalization Committee ===
Chairman	Term	Ref.
Humza Khan	2019 – 2020	
Munir Ahmad Khan Sadhana	2020 – 2021	
Haroon Malik	2021 – 2025	
Saud Hashmi	2025	

== See also ==
- Football in Pakistan
