= Akhtar Mohiuddin =

Pakistani football manager

Personal information
- Full name: Akhtar Mohiuddin
- Date of birth: 1 March 1956 (age 70)
- Place of birth: Chaman, Pakistan

Senior career*
Years	Team	Apps	(Gls)
- Pakistan Customs
- House Building Finance Corporation

Managerial career
- 2006–2007: Pakistan (assistant)
- 2007–2008: Pakistan
- 2010: Pakistan U23
- 2011–2012: PMC Athletico
- Higher Education Commission
- 2025–: Pakistan U17
- * Club domestic league appearances and goals

Akhtar Mohiuddin (Urdu: اختر محی الدین; born 1 March 1956) is a Pakistani professional football coach and former player. Mohiuddin also served as the head coach of the Pakistan football team in 2007 and 2008. He has also served as physical trainer of the Pakistan national hockey and tennis teams.

== Playing career ==
Mohiuddin played for several Balochistan clubs and represented Balochistan and Quetta Division at the National Football Championship. He also played for departmental teams such as Pakistan Customs and House Building Finance Corporation.

== Managerial career ==
Akhtar served as physical trainer of Pakistan tennis team in the 1991 Davis Cup in Jordan, and the Pakistan national hockey team during their tour to Malaysia in 1992.

Mohiuddin earned a football coaching diploma from Germany in 1993. That diploma was later declared by the AFC equivalent to its Licence B. He later served as coach and chief selector of the Balochistan football team. He also coached Afghan Chaman.

=== Pakistan ===
Mohiuddin served as assistant coach of the Pakistan national team under head coach Salman Sharida between 2006 and 2007. In April 2007, he coached Pakistan Football Federation XI at the E. K. Nayanar Memorial Gold Cup in India. When Sharida quit as Pakistan manager in 2007, Mohiuddin was given the role 2 months before the 2010 World Cup qualifiers. Pakistan had to face Asian champions Iraq. Pakistan were defeated 7-0 in the first leg but they were able to hold Iraq to a goalless draw in the second leg.

After the second leg draw, Mohiuddin was retained as manager for the rest of the 2008 fixtures. Pakistan played a two-match away series against Nepal in late March as preparation for the 2008 AFC Challenge Cup qualifiers. Pakistan lost the first match 2-1, despite leading for most of the match, after two late goals for Nepal. They bounced back however, in the second match and won 2-0.

They then travelled to Taipei for 2008 AFC Challenge Cup qualifiers where Pakistan were favourites to qualify for the main round. Pakistan first faced Chinese Taipei, and they came back from 1-0 down to eventually win the game 2-1. However, in the next game, Sri Lanka defeated Pakistan 7-1 on the back of a hat trick from Kasun Jayasuriya. In the final game, a dead rubber, Pakistan defeated Guam 9-2, achieving victory by the widest margin in Pakistan's history.

The 2008 SAFF Championship would prove to be Mohiuddin’s last tournament as manager when Pakistan failed to go beyond the group stages, losing 3-0 to Maldives, 2-0 to India and 4-1 to Nepal.

=== Pakistan U23 ===
He briefly returned as the Pakistan U23 manager for the 2010 Asian Games with Graham Roberts as a coaching consultant. The team performed poorly as Pakistan lost 3 of their matches and drew one and Mohiuddin was replaced afterwards. He also served as head coach of Quetta Zorawar at the 2010 Super Football League.

=== PMC Club Athletico Faisalabad ===
He was appointed the head coach of PMC Athletico for the 2011/12 season. PMC Athletico went on to finish 14th in the league, 3 points above the relegation zone.

=== Higher Education Commission ===
By 2014, Mohiuddin was serving as senior national coach in the Pakistan Sports Board Quetta Centre, and held several training sessions with Chaman based Pakistan Premier League clubs Muslim FC, Afghan Chaman and Pak Afghan. In April 2014, Mohiuddin passed the AFC A License course in Bahrain.

Akhtar was later associated with the Higher Education Commission department. He served as head coach of the women team at the 2021 National Women's Football Championship.

=== Pakistan U17 ===
In 2025, Mohiuddin was appointed head coach of the Pakistan U17 team for the 2026 AFC U-17 Asian Cup qualification.

== Personal life ==
In December 2018, Mohiuddin was given lifetime achievement award by the Chief Minister of Balochistan due to his contributions in sports. In May 2021, he was honoured by IG Motorway Police Syed Kaleem Imam.
