= 2009 Pakistan Premier League =

Pakistan Premier League
- Season: 2009
- Dates: 25 July 2009 – 13 December 2009
- Champions: Khan Research Laboratories; 1st Premier League title 1st Pakistani title
- Relegated: Baloch Nushki; PMC Athletico
- AFC President's Cup: Khan Research Laboratories
- Matches: 182
- Goals: 454 (2.49 per match)
- Top goalscorer: Arif Mehmood (20 goals)
- Biggest home win: Pakistan Airlines 5–0 Habib Bank (9 October 2009); Pakistan Airlines 5–0 Afghan Chaman (27 October 2009); Habib Bank 5–0 PMC Athletico (23 November 2009)
- Biggest away win: Pakistan Navy 0–5 WAPDA (4 October 2009)
- Highest scoring: Karachi Port Trust 6–2 Afghan Chaman (21 October 2009)
- Longest winning run: 6 games Karachi Port Trust
- Longest unbeaten run: 15 games Khan Research Laboratories
- Longest winless run: 23 games Baloch Nushki
- Longest losing run: 11 games Baloch Nushki

The 2009 Pakistan Premier League was the 6th season of Pakistan Premier League and 55th season of Pakistan football league. A total of 14 teams competed in the league, with Khan Research Laboratories unseating the two-time defending champions WAPDA. The league started on 25 July 2009 and ended on 13 December 2009.

The race for the title went to the final day of the season with Khan Research Laboratories and Pakistan Army tied on 57 points. Khan Research Laboratories won their final game defeating Pakistan Airlines 1–0, which meant Pakistan Army had to defeat Karachi Port Trust by at least 11 goals, to gain parity in points and have a higher ratio of goals scored, to win the league. Pakistan Army defeated Karachi Port Trust 2–1, tying both teams on 60 points. Khan Research Laboratories won the league on goal difference, as Khan Research Laboratories finished the season with 10 goals ahead of Pakistan Army; Khan Research Laboratories finished with a goal difference of +32 compared to Pakistan Army's +22. It was the first time a team other than Army or WAPDA won the league since its inception in 2004. PMC Club Athletico Faisalabad and Baloch Nushki faced relegation after finishing in the bottom two.

== Format ==
Teams play each other on a home and away basis

The winners will represent Pakistan at the 2010 AFC President's Cup. The bottom two teams were expected to have been relegated to the Pakistan Football Federation League, but the league was expanded at the end of the season and the bottom two teams survived relegation. Two teams will be promoted to the PPL.

== Teams ==
Pakistan Steel and PTV were relegated to 2009-10 Pakistan Football Federation League after finishing at bottom two in 2008-09 Pakistan Premier League. The two relegated teams were replaced by Baloch Nushki who won the Pakistan Football Federation League and Pakistan Airforce who came second to Baloch Nushki.

The league comprised five teams from Karachi (Habib Bank Limited, K-Electric, Karachi Port Trust, National Bank and Pakistan Airlines; two from Lahore (Pak Elektron Limited and WAPDA); two from Islamabad (Army and Airforce, two from Rawalpindi (Navy and Khan Research Laboratories), one from Faisalabad (PMC Athletico), one from Nushki (Baloch Nushki) and one from Chaman (Afghan Chaman).

=== Location and stadia ===
Locations of teams in the 2009 PPL

Club	City/State	Stadium
Afghan Chaman	Chaman	Govt. High School Ground
Baloch Nushki	Nushki	Nushki Stadium
Habib Bank	Karachi	People's Sports Complex
Karachi Electric Supply Corporation	Karachi	People's Sports Complex
Karachi Port Trust	Karachi	People's Sports Complex
Khan Research Laboratories	Rawalpindi	KRL Football Stadium
National Bank	Karachi	Korangi Baloch Stadium
Pak Elektron	Lahore	Model Town Football Academy Ground
Pakistan Airforce	Peshawar	PAF Sports Complex
Pakistan Army	Rawalpindi	Army Stadium
Navy F.C.	Islamabad	Naval Sports Complex
Pakistan Airlines	Karachi	Korangi Baloch Stadium
PMC Athletico	Faisalabad	University of Agriculture Ground
WAPDA	Lahore	Railway Stadium

== League table ==
Pos	Team	Pld	W	D	L	GF	GA	GD	Pts	Qualification or relegation
1	Khan Research Laboratories	26	18	6	2	40	8	+32	60	Qualification to 2010 AFC President's Cup
2	Pakistan Army	26	19	3	4	36	14	+22	60	
3	WAPDA	26	17	6	3	58	24	+34	57	
4	Pakistan Navy	26	17	6	3	43	24	+19	57	
5	Karachi Port Trust	26	11	5	10	34	30	+4	38	
6	Pakistan Airlines	26	10	6	10	45	29	+16	36	
7	Pak Elektron	26	10	6	10	36	28	+8	36	
8	Karachi Electric Supply Corporation	26	9	7	10	28	27	+1	34	
9	Habib Bank	26	7	9	10	34	39	−5	30	
10	National Bank	26	7	5	14	24	42	−18	26	
11	Pakistan Air Force	26	7	4	15	27	38	−11	25	
12	Afghan Chaman	26	6	4	16	20	51	−31	22	
13	PMC Athletico	26	6	3	17	19	40	−21	21	Relegation to 2010 PFF League
14	Baloch Nushki	26	2	2	22	10	60	−50	8	Relegation to 2010 PFF League

First match(es) will be played: July 2009. Source: PFF
Rules for classification: 1) points; 2) head-to-head points; 3) head-to-head goal difference; 4) goal difference; 5) number of goals scored; 6) drawing of lots

== Fixtures and results ==
Home \ Away	AFG	ARM	BAL	HBL	KESC	KPT	KRL	NAV	NBP	PAF	PEL	PIA	PMCA	WAP
Afghan F.C.		0–3 (Note: The home matches of both Afghan Chaman and Baloch Nushki against Pakistan Army, Khan Research Laboratories, Pakistan Navy, Pakistan Airforce and WAPDA were all moved from Balochistan to Karachi, after the service teams refused to play in Chaman and Nushki citing security reasons; in protest against this decision Afghan and Baloch refused to honour these nominal home matches and were awarded five 0-3 losses each.)	1–1	1–1	3–0	0–0	0–3	0–3	3–1	0–3	3–1	1–0	0–3	0–3
Army F.C.	1–0		2–0	1–1	1–0	1–0	0–0	0–1	1–0	1–0	2–1	1–0	2–0	2–3
Baloch F.C.	0–1	0–3		0–3	1–3	1–4	0–3	0–3	0–1	0–3	0–3	1–2	1–0	0–3
HBL F.C.	3–1		4–0		1–0	2–2		2–3	1–1	1–3	0–1	1–1	5–0	1–1
KESC F.C.	2–1	0–0	4–0	0–1		1–2	0–4	1–1	0–0	2–1		1–1	2–0	0–0
KPT F.C.	6–2	1–2	2–1	1–0	1–2			1–2	2–0	2–0	0–2	2–1		0–3
KRL F.C.	1–0	0–2	3–1	1–0	0–0	1–0		3–0	2–0	3–0	1–0	1–0	1–0	1–1
Navy F.C.	2–0	1–0	2–0	2–1	3–0	0–0	1–1		1–0		1–0	1–1	1–0	0–5
NBP F.C.	1–0	0–3	2–1	2–3	0–4	1–3	1–0	0–3		1–1	0–2	3–1	1–2	
PAF F.C.	1–1	0–1	1–0	3–0	0–3	2–0	1–3	0–0	0–3 (Note: National Bank were awarded three points and three goals following their protest that Pakistan Airforce had fielded an illegal player against them in the Premier Football League match that was held at the PAF Sports Complex in Islamabad on August 2. Pakistan Airforce won the original tie 2-0.)		1–2	2–1	1–1	0–1
PEL F.C.	4–0	0–1	4–0	1–1	0–1	3–0	1–1	4–3	0–1	2–0			1–0	1–1
PIA F.C.	5–0		4–0	5–0	2–0	1–1	0–1	2–2	3–0	4–2	3–3		2–1	0–1
PMC Athletico	1–0	0–2	1–0	1–2	2–1	1–0	0–1	1–2	1–1	2–0	1–1	0–1		0–1
WAPDA F.C.	4–0	5–1	4–1	2–2	2–1	0–1	0–1	1–3	3–2	2–1	2–1	3–2	5–1	

Updated to match(es) played on 13 December 2009. Source: RSSSF
Legend: Blue = home team win; Yellow = draw; Red = away team win.

== Statistics ==
=== Scoring ===
- First goal of the season: Qadeer Khan for Habib Bank against National Bank (25 July 2009).
- Last goal of the season: Muhammad Imran for Pakistan Army against Karachi Port Trust (13 December 2009).
- Fastest goal of the season: 5 minutes – Arif Mehmood for WAPDA against Pakistan Army (9 November 2009).

=== Top goalscorers ===
As of 13 December 2009

Rank	Scorer	Club	Goals
1	(Pakistan) Arif Mehmood	WAPDA	20
2	(Pakistan) Muhammad Ishtiaq	Habib Bank	11
2	(Pakistan) Asmatullah	Pak Elektron	11
3	(Pakistan) Bilal Ahmed	Habib Bank	10
3	(Pakistan) Zahid Ahmed	Karachi Port Trust	10
3	(Pakistan) Nomi Martin Gill	Pakistan Navy	10
3	(Pakistan) Abdul Rehman	Karachi Electric Supply Corporation	10

=== Hat-tricks ===
As of 13 December 2009

Player	For	Against	Result	Date
Arif Mehmood	WAPDA	PMC Athletico	5–1	26 July 2009
Nomi Martin Gill	Pakistan Navy	Karachi Electric Supply Corporation	3–0	7 August 2009
Arif Mehmood	WAPDA	Pakistan Airlines	3–2	21 August 2009
Arif Mehmood	WAPDA	Pakistan Navy	5–0	4 October 2009
Shakir Lashari	Pakistan Airlines	Baloch Nushki	4–0	21 October 2009
Bilal Ahmed	Habib Bank	Baloch Nushki	4–0	23 October 2009
Zeeshan Ali	Pakistan Airlines	Afghan Chaman	5–0	27 October 2009
Aurangzeb Baloch	Karachi Electric Supply Corporation	Baloch Nushki	4–0	27 October 2009

== Awards ==
Award	Player	Club
Top scorer	Arif Mehmood	WAPDA
Best goalkeeper	Ghulam Nabi	KRL
Best Player of the Season	Nasrullah Khan	PIA
Fairplay award	–	Afghan Chaman
