= 2012–13 Pakistan Premier League =

Pakistan Premier League
- Season: 2012–13
- Champions: KRL; 3rd Premier League title 3rd Pakistani title
- Relegated: Wohaib; PMC Athletico
- AFC President's Cup: KRL
- Matches: 240
- Goals: 550 (2.29 per match)
- Top goalscorer: Kaleemullah (35 goals)
- Biggest home win: Habib Bank 6–0 Wohaib (28 December 2012)
- Biggest away win: Wohaib 0–4 Khan Research Laboratories (12 December 2012); PMC Athletico 0–4 Khan Research Laboratories (14 December 2012)
- Highest scoring: Karachi Port Trust 4–6 Karachi Electric Supply Corporation (11 December 2012)
- Longest winning run: 14 games Khan Research Laboratories
- Longest unbeaten run: 22 games Khan Research Laboratories
- Longest winless run: 15 games Baloch Nushki; Wohaib
- Longest losing run: 15 games Wohaib

The 2012–13 Pakistan Premier League was the 9th season of the Pakistan Premier League, the Pakistani professional league for association football clubs, since its establishment in 2004. The season began on 5 September 2012 and ended on 15 January 2013.

Khan Research Laboratories were the defending champions, having won their second Premier League title the previous season. This was their second top division league title.

On 13 January 2013, Khan Research Laboratories won their third Premier League title and Pakistani titles after drawing 0–0 with Pakistan Airlines at KPT Stadium.

Kaleemullah Khan became the first player to score 30+ goals in a Pakistan Premier League season, after scoring 35 goals.

== Format ==
Teams play each other on a home and away basis

The winners will represent Pakistan at the 2013 AFC President's Cup. The bottom two teams will be relegated to the Pakistan Football Federation League.

== Teams ==
Pakistan Police and Pak Elektron were relegated at the end of the 2011–12 season and were replaced by Wohaib and Zarai Taraqiati.

During the season, the Pakistan Navy vacated their previous home ground, the Municipal Stadium in Rawalpindi, for the Karachi Port Trust Stadium in Karachi due to the pitch condition at the former ground, thus KPT Stadium was used by three teams this season, the other two being Karachi Port Trust and National Bank, both had used KPT Stadium as their home ground since the start of Pakistan Premier League.

=== Location and stadia ===
Locations of teams in the 2012–13 PPL

Club	City	Stadium
Afghan Chaman	Chaman	Government High School Ground
Baloch Nushki	Nushki	Nushki Stadium
Habib Bank Limited	Karachi	Peoples Football Stadium
Karachi Electric Supply Corporation	Karachi	Peoples Football Stadium
Karachi Port Trust	Karachi	Karachi Port Trust Stadium
Khan Research Laboratories	Rawalpindi	KRL Football Stadium
Muslim	Quetta	Government High School Ground
National Bank of Pakistan	Karachi	Aga Khan Gymkhana Ground
Pakistan Air Force	Islamabad	Jinnah Sports Stadium
Pakistan Army	Rawalpindi	Army Stadium
Pakistan International Airlines	Karachi	Korangi Baloch Stadium
Pakistan Navy	Karachi	Karachi Port Trust Stadium
PMC Club Athletico Faisalabad	Faisalabad	PMC Football Ground
WAPDA	Lahore	Railway Stadium
Wohaib	Lahore	UMT Football Ground
Zarai Taraqiati	Islamabad	Jinnah Sports Stadium

== League table ==
Pos	Team	Pld	W	D	L	GF	GA	GD	Pts	Qualification or relegation
1	Khan Research Laboratories (C)	30	21	8	1	65	15	+50	71	Qualification for 2013 AFC President's Cup group stage
2	Karachi Electric Supply Corporation	30	18	8	4	60	27	+33	62	
3	Muslim	30	18	8	4	47	22	+25	62	
4	Pakistan Army	30	17	7	6	36	14	+22	58	
5	Pakistan Air Force	30	15	8	7	46	27	+19	53	
6	National Bank	30	11	11	8	34	26	+8	44	
7	Pakistan Navy	30	9	10	11	31	32	−1	37	
8	Pakistan Airlines	30	8	12	10	28	27	+1	36	
9	Afghan Chaman	30	10	5	15	28	38	−10	35	
10	Baloch Nushki	30	8	10	12	28	37	−9	34	
11	WAPDA	30	7	11	12	36	44	−8	32	
12	Karachi Port Trust	30	8	8	14	34	44	−10	32	
13	Habib Bank	30	7	11	12	28	38	−10	32	
14	Zarai Taraqiati	30	6	9	15	22	29	−7	27	
15	PMC Club Athletico Faisalabad (R)	30	4	13	13	19	45	−26	25	Relegation to 2013–14 Pakistan Football Federation League
16	Wohaib (R)	30	1	5	24	8	75	−67	8	Relegation to 2013–14 Pakistan Football Federation League

Updated to match(es) played on 15 January 2013. Source: RSSSF.com
Rules for classification: 1) points; 2) head-to-head points; 3) goal difference; 4) number of goals scored; 5) taking lots
(C) Champions; (R) Relegated

== Fixtures and results ==
Home \ Away	AFG	ARM	BAL	HBL	KESC	KPT	KRL	MUS	NAV	NBP	PAF	PIA	PMC	WAP	WOH	ZTBL
Afghan F.C.		1–1	0–1	2–1	0–2	1–0	0–2	1–2	3–0	0–0	3–0	1–0	0–1	3–0	3–0	1–3
Army F.C.	1–0		2–0	1–0	1–2	4–1	0–1	2–0	1–0	1–1	0–1	2–0	3–0	2–1	2–0	1–0
Baloch F.C.	3–0	0–1		2–0	1–2	0–0	0–0	0–0	3–0	4–1	3–0	0–0	1–1	3–0	3–0	1–1
HBL F.C.	1–3	2–0	1–1		0–0	1–1	1–2	0–1	1–3	1–1	0–1	0–2	0–0	2–2	6–0	1–0
KESC F.C.	2–0	2–1	5–0	2–0		0–1	0–3	3–0	1–0	1–1	1–0	1–1	5–1	1–0	5–0	4–0
KPT F.C.	2–0	0–0	1–1	1–3	4–6		1–2	3–2	1–2	0–1	2–2	1–0	5–0	1–1	2–0	1–2
KRL F.C.	4–0	0–0	4–0	4–0	2–2	3–1		4–1	2–1	1–0	2–1	1–1	3–0	1–0	5–1	1–1
Muslim F.C.	1–1	0–0	1–1	1–1	2–0	2–1	1–0		3–0	1–0	3–0	2–0	4–0	3–0	3–0	1–0
Navy F.C.	3–0	0–2	4–0	0–0	0–3	3–0	1–1	0–0		0–3	0–1	1–1	2–1	0–0	4–0	2–0
NBP F.C.	3–0	1–0	2–0	2–2	1–1	2–0	0–0	0–0	0–3		1–2	1–3	0–1	0–1	3–0	2–1
PAF	2–1	0–1	5–0	5–0	1–0	0–0	1–2	2–2	1–0	3–1		3–0	1–1	2–2	3–0	1–1
PIA F.C.	1–0	0–1	1–0	0–0	2–2	0–1	0–0	0–1	1–1	1–1	0–2		3–0	3–1	4–0	2–1
PMC Athletico	1–1	1–1	0–0	0–1	1–1	3–0	0–4	0–1	0–1	1–2	0–0	1–1		1–1	2–2	1–1
WAPDA F.C.	1–1	0–0	3–0	1–2	3–4	1–1	1–4	1–3	1–1	1–1	0–2	1–1	1–0		3–1	4–1
Wohaib F.C.	0–1	0–2	1–0	0–1	1–1	0–2	0–4	1–4	1–1	0–2	0–3	0–0	0–1	0–2		0–0
ZTBL F.C.	0–1	0–3	1–0	0–0	0–1	2–0	0–3	1–2	1–1	0–1	1–1	1–0	0–0	0–3	3–0	

Updated to match(es) played on 15 January 2013. Source: FIFA.com
Legend: Blue = home team win; Yellow = draw; Red = away team win.

== Statistics ==
=== Scoring ===
- First goal of the season: Sajjad Ahmed for Pakistan Navy against Karachi Port Trust (5 September 2012).
- Last goal of the season: Muhammad Adnan for Pakistan Navy against Khan Research Laboratories (14 January 2013).
- Fastest goal of the season: 59 seconds – Abdus Salam for Karachi Electric Supply Corporation against WAPDA (14 January 2013).
- Most hat-trick by a single player: 7
  - Kaleemullah Khan
- Largest winning margin: 6 goals
  - Habib Bank 6–0 Wohaib (28 December 2012)
- Highest scoring game: 10 goals
  - Karachi Port Trust 4–6 Karachi Electric Supply Corporation (11 December 2012)
- Most goals scored in a match by a single team: 6 goals
  - Habib Bank 6–0 Wohaib (28 December 2012)
  - Karachi Port Trust 4–6 Karachi Electric Supply Corporation (11 December 2012)
- Most goals scored in a match by a losing team: 4 goals
  - Karachi Port Trust 4–6 Karachi Electric Supply Corporation (11 December 2012)

=== Top scorers ===
As of 15 January 2013

Rank	Player	Club	Goals
1	Kaleemullah Khan	Khan Research Laboratories	35
2	Muhammad Rasool	Karachi Electric Supply Corporation	25
3	Ansar Abbas	Pakistan Army	16
4	Muhammad Bin Younus	Karachi Port Trust	13

=== Hat-tricks ===
Player	For	Against	Result	Date	Ref.
Muhammad Rasool	Karachi Electric Supply Company	Baloch Nushki	5–0	20 September 2012	
Arif Mehmood	WAPDA	Zarai Taraqiati	4–1	1 October 2012	
Kaleemullah Khan	Khan Research Laboratories	Habib Bank	4–0	11 October 2012	
Kaleemullah Khan	Khan Research Laboratories	Muslim	4–1	16 October 2012	
Kaleemullah Khan	Khan Research Laboratories	Afghan Chaman	4–0	18 October 2012	
Kaleemullah Khan	Khan Research Laboratories	Baloch Nushki	4–0	21 October 2012	
Kaleemullah Khan	Khan Research Laboratories	Wohaib	3–0	6 November 2012	
Sanaullah	Baloch Nushki	National Bank	4–1	9 November 2012	
Kaleemullah Khan	Khan Research Laboratories	PMC Athletico	3–0	9 November 2012	
Muhammad Rasool^{4}	Karachi Electric Supply Company	Karachi Port Trust	6–4	11 December 2012	
Kaleemullah Khan	Khan Research Laboratories	WAPDA	4–1	17 December 2012	
Aurangzeb Baba	Karachi Electric Supply Company	PMC Athletico	4–0	26 December 2012	

^{4} Player scored four goals

=== Awards ===
As of 15 January 2013

Award	Player	Club
Top Scorer	Kaleemullah Khan	Khan Research Laboratories
Most Valuable Player	Saeed Ahmed	Muslim
Best Goalkeeper	Jaffar Khan	Pakistan Army
Fair Play	—	Zarai Taraqiati
