= Mehran FC =

Pakistani football club

- Full name: Mehran Football Club
- Founded: 1980; 46 years ago
- League: PFF League
- 2009–10: Final group stage

Mehran Football Club is a Pakistani football club based in Islamabad. It last competed in the PFF League.

== History ==
The club was founded in 1980. In 2003, the club participated in the Islamabad Football Association league. In 2004, the club won in the final of the league, on penalties, against Pakistan Television. In 2005, the club participated in the PFF National Challenge Cup, where it finished second in group A, winning by 3–0 against Pakistan Ordnance Factory, 5–3 against DFA XI from Gilgit, and 5–1 against Pilot FC from Azad Kashmir. The club failed to advance to the playoff as it trailed POF on goal difference. In the Islamabad Football Association League the same year, the club recorded a 1–2 defeat in the final against Ravi FC.

In the third-tier National C-Division Soccer League 2005–06, the club lost the third place match by 1–2 against Bannu Red, failing to advance to the 2006 PFF National League.

The club made its professional debut in the 2008–09 PFF League. It finished first in the group A of the club leg, losing by 0–3 against Baloch Nushki, and winning 3–0 against Karachi Kickers. The club lost in the semifinals by 1–2 against Muslim FC.

In October 2009, the secretary general of the club was suspended by the Islamabad Football Association due to confrontation with the Pakistan Football Federation.

In the next 2009–10 PFF League, the club finished last in the group A of the second stage of club phase, comprising Baloch Quetta and Wohaib.

In 2013, the club won IFA Challenge Cup. In 2014, the club participated in the Naveed ul Hassan Memorial Tournament against Huma, with a team comprising international defender Kamran Khan as captain, who played in the youth for the team. In 2018, the club won the Unity Football Cup in the Jinnah Sports Stadium.

== Competitive record ==
The club's competitive records since the 2008–09 season are listed below.

Season	Div	Tms	Pos	National Challenge Cup	AFC President's Cup	AFC Cup
2008–09	PFF League	15	Semi-finals	DNP	DNP	DNP
2009–10	PFF League	18	Final group stage	DNP	DNP	DNP
