= Pakistan National Club Championship =

Association football league in Pakistan

National Club Championship
- Organising body: Pakistan Football Federation
- Founded: 2006
- Folded: Unknown
- Country: Pakistan
- Confederation: AFC
- Number of clubs: 6
- Level on pyramid: 3
- Promotion to: PFF League
- Domestic cup: PFF National Challenge Cup
- Last champions: Baloch FC Nushki (2006)
- Most championships: Baloch FC Nushki (1 title)

The National Club Championship was a third-tier football competition organised by the Pakistan Football Federation (PFF). It was introduced in 2006 at Lahore as the third-tier (C-Division) of the Pakistani football league system, below the Pakistan Premier League and the PFF League. Further editions after 2006 are not documented.

== History ==
Following advice from FIFA and the Asian Football Confederation, the Pakistan Football Federation reorganised its league structure in 2004 by introducing two divisions: the Pakistan Premier League (A-Division) and the PFF League (B-Division). In 2006, the federation expanded the system into three tiers, launching the National Club Championship in Lahore.

The winners and leading teams from the competition advanced to the 2006 PFF League, providing a pathway into the national pyramid.

The inaugural 2006 edition was won by Baloch FC Nushki.

== Format ==
The event was contested by leading local and regional clubs unaffiliated with government departments. Six teams took part in the inaugural edition, divided into two groups of three. Each team played the others in its group once, with the top two from each group advancing to the semi-finals. The winners of the semi-finals met in the final, while the losers contested a third-place playoff. The champions, runners-up, and third-placed earned promotion to the PFF League.

== Results ==
| Season | Champions | Score | Runner-up | Third place (promoted) |
|---|---|---|---|---|
| 2006 | Baloch FC Nushki | 1–1 (3–2 pens) | Punjab Medical College | Bannu Red |

== 2006 season ==
=== Clubs ===
| Team | Location |
|---|---|
| Punjab Medical College | Faisalabad |
| Baloch FC Nushki | Nushki |
| Mehran FC | Islamabad |
| Malir National | Karachi |
| Bannu Red | Bannu |
| Kashmir United FC | Azad Kashmir |

=== Group Stage ===
==== Group A ====
| Pos | Team | Pld | W | D | L | GF | GA | GD | Pts |
|---|---|---|---|---|---|---|---|---|---|
| 1 | Punjab Medical College | 2 | 2 | 0 | 0 | 16 | 0 | +16 | 6 |
| 2 | Baloch FC Nushki | 2 | 1 | 0 | 1 | 8 | 6 | +2 | 3 |
| 3 | Kashmir United | 2 | 0 | 0 | 2 | 1 | 19 | −18 | 0 |

Source: RSSSF
20 June 2006

| Punjab Medical College | 5–0 | Baloch FC Nushki |
|---|---|---|
| | Report |

22 June 2006

| Kashmir United | 1–8 | Baloch FC Nushki |
|---|---|---|
| | Report |

23 June 2006

| Kashmir United | 0–11 | Punjab Medical College |
|---|---|---|
| | Report |

==== Group B ====
| Pos | Team | Pld | W | D | L | GF | GA | GD | Pts |
|---|---|---|---|---|---|---|---|---|---|
| 1 | Bannu Red | 2 | 2 | 0 | 0 | 13 | 2 | +11 | 6 |
| 2 | Mehran FC | 2 | 1 | 0 | 1 | 4 | 6 | −2 | 3 |
| 3 | Malir National | 2 | 0 | 0 | 2 | 3 | 13 | −10 | 0 |

Source: RSSSF
21 June 2006

| Malir National | 1–9 | Bannu Red |
|---|---|---|
| | Report |

22 June 2006

| Mehran FC | 3–2 | Malir National |
|---|---|---|
| | Report |

23 June 2006

| Mehran FC | 1–4 | Bannu Red |
|---|---|---|
| | Report |

=== Knockout stage ===
==== Semifinals ====
25 June 2006

| Punjab Medical College | 3–2 | Mehran FC |
|---|---|---|
| | Report |

26 June 2006

| Bannu Red | 0–2 | Baloch FC Nushki |
|---|---|---|
| | Report |

==== Third place ====
27 June 2006

| Bannu Red | 2–1 | Mehran FC |
|---|---|---|
| | Report |

==== Final ====
28 June 2006

| Punjab Medical College | 1–1 | Baloch FC Nushki |
|---|---|---|
| | Report |
Penalties
| | 2–3 |

=== Outcome ===
The top three qualified for the 2006 PFF League.

| Champions | Runner-up | Third place |
|---|---|---|
| Baloch FC Nushki | Punjab Medical College | Bannu Red |
