= Baloch FC (Nushki) =

Pakistani football club

- Full name: Baloch Football Club Nushki
- Short name: BFC
- Founded: 2004; 22 years ago
- Ground: Nushki Stadium
- Capacity: 1,000
- Owner: Meer Fahad Mengal
- Manager: Abid Hussain
- League: PFF League
Home colours	Away colours

Baloch Football Club is a Pakistani professional football club based in the city of Nushki, Balochistan. It currently competes in the PFF League, the second tier of men's league football in the country, after getting relegated in the 2018–19 season of the top-tier Pakistan Premier League.

== History ==
=== Early years and promotion to second-tier (2004–2006) ===
Founded in 2004, Baloch Nushki played in the inaugural third-tier 2006 Pakistan National Club Championship, and won the tournament in the final by penalties after a 1–1 draw against Punjab Medical College. They were promoted to the second-tier 2006 PFF National League.

=== PFF League (2006–2009) ===
In the 2006 and the 2007–08 PFF League of the national second-tier, the club failed to advance past the group stage.

In the 2008–09 PFF League, they won 1–0 against PAF F.C. in the final of the club leg, gaining promotion to then 14-club Pakistan Premier League for the first time.

=== Entry to top-tier (2009–2014) ===
In their first season in the top-tier league, they finished last in the table, but their relegation along with PMC Athletico Faisalabad was revoked as the next season was extended to 16 teams. The club was rated among the worst teams in the world, after finishing in the bottom of the league with two wins, two draws and 22 defeats from their 26 games. Later on the club emerged strongly, being few of the football clubs that gave competition to well-established departmental sides which dominated the Pakistan football domestic structure in the early years.

=== Yo-yo years (2014–present) ===
In the 2013–14 Pakistan Premier League, they were relegated after finishing 15 in the table. In the second-tier 2014 PFF League, they lost to Pakistan Navy in the final. They were again promoted to the Pakistan Premier League as runner-ups.

The team returned for the 2018–19 Pakistan Premier League season after years of Pakistan Football Federation turmoil and football inactivity, however the team was relegated again from the top tier after finishing 13th in the table.

In 2023, Baloch Nushki was shortlisted by the Pakistan Football Federation to compete in a three-team playoff, alongside Afghan Chaman and Muslim FC, for Pakistan's sole entry in the inaugural SAFF Club Championship expected to launch in 2024. Eventually, with no club meeting the financial and requirements in time, Pakistan forfeited its slot and the tournament also didn't launch.

== Stadium ==
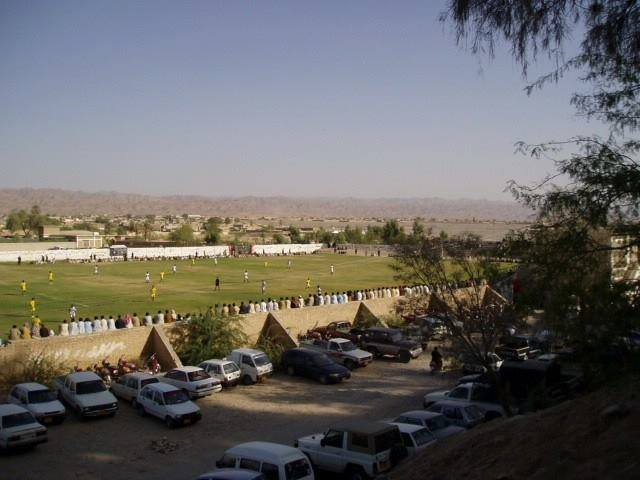
Nushki Stadium

The Nushki Stadium in Nushki serve as the team own ground. It has regularly hosted several Pakistan Premier League fixtures.

== Players ==
=== Current squad ===
As of 1 August 2023

Note: Flags indicate national team as defined under FIFA eligibility rules; some limited exceptions apply. Players may hold more than one non-FIFA nationality.

No.	Pos.	Nation	Player
—	GK	PAK	Sher Zaman
—	GK	PAK	Ihsan Ullah
—	DF	PAK	Siraj Uddin
—	DF	PAK	Rizwan Ahmad
—	DF	PAK	Ali Jan
—	DF	PAK	Faisal Nazar
—	DF	PAK	Muhammad Nasir
—	DF	PAK	Noor Uddin
—	MF	PAK	Sameeullah
—	MF	PAK	Muhammad Arif
—	MF	PAK	Muhammad Farooq
—	MF	PAK	Doulat Khan
—	MF	PAK	Shoukat Ali
—	MF	PAK	Khalil Ahmed
—	MF	PAK	Ataullah

No.	Pos.	Nation	Player
—	MF	PAK	Sohail Baloch
—	MF	PAK	Abdul Qadeer
—	MF	PAK	Kahif Rafique
—	FW	PAK	Obaidullah
—	FW	PAK	Zubair Ahmed
—	FW	PAK	Aourang Zaib
—	FW	PAK	Azbadin
—	FW	PAK	Muhammad Asif Usman
—	FW	PAK	Shams Uddin
—	FW	PAK	Muhammad Asif Ali
—	FW	PAK	Ali Khan
—	FW	PAK	Shayek Baloch
—	FW	PAK	Shaista Khan

== Personnel ==
=== Current technical staff ===
As of 1 August 2023

Position	Name
Head Coach	(Pakistan) Khalid
Team Manager	(Pakistan) Abid Hussain
Assistant Team Manager	(Pakistan) Abdullah
Goalkeeper Coach	(Pakistan) Majid Ali
Scout	(Pakistan) Asif Ali

== Competitive record ==
The club's competitive records since the 2006–07 season are listed below.

Season	Div	Tms	Pos	National Challenge Cup	AFC President's Cup	AFC Cup
2006–07	PFF League	8	Group stage	DNP	DNP	DNP
2007–08	PFF League	14	Group stage	DNP	DNP	DNP
2008–09	PFF League	15	1	DNP	DNP	DNP
2009–10	Pakistan Premier League	14	14	DNP	DNP	DNP
2010–11	Pakistan Premier League	16	11	DNP	DNP	DNP
2011–12	Pakistan Premier League	16	13	DNP	DNP	DNP
2012–13	Pakistan Premier League	16	10	DNP	DNP	DNP
2013–14	Pakistan Premier League	16	15	DNP	DNP	DNP
2014–15	PFF League	30	2	DNP	DNP	DNP
2018–19	Pakistan Premier League	16	13	DNP	DNP	DNP

== Honours ==
League

- National Club Championship
  - Champions (1): 2006
- PFF League
  - Champions (2): 2008–09, 2014–15
