= Pakistani football league system =

The Pakistan football league system consists of interconnected leagues for football clubs in Pakistan. The two-tier system has a hierarchical format with promotion and relegation between leagues. The last top-tier Pakistan Premier League featured 12 teams, while the second-tier PFFL B Division comprised 18 teams.

== Men's ==
=== System by period ===
==== National A-Division Football Championship (1992–1994) ====
The National Football Championship served as the highest level football competition from 1948 to 2003, held on knock-out basis and a closed format competition rather than league system. Under the tenure of PFF General Secretary Hafiz Salman Butt, the 1992–93 and 1993–94 seasons of National Football Championship were contested in a league-style format rather than as a knockout competition, becoming Pakistan's first ever national league format competition. Sponsored as the National Lifebuoy A-Division Football Championship, the tournament ran across several months and introduced a system of promotion and relegation with the second-tier National Lifebuoy B-Division Football Championship. The A-Division titles were won by Pakistan Airlines (1992–93) and Pakistan Army (1993–94), while the B-Division was won by Crescent Textile Mills (1992), National Bank (1993), and Frontier Scouts (1994).

The experiment lasted only two seasons. Following Butt’s removal from office in 1994 amid political disputes and allegations of abuse of power with PFF president Mian Muhammad Azhar, the competition reverted to its previous knockout format.

==== Pakistan Premier League (2004–2021) ====
In August 2003, politician Faisal Saleh Hayat assumed control of the Pakistan Football Federation. Under his administration, the National Football Championship was discontinued and replaced in 2004 by the Pakistan Premier League, with the PFF League serving as the second tier.

In 2006, the Pakistan Football Federation introduced the National Club Championship as a third tier beneath the PFF League. The competition brought together amateur and semi-professional clubs, with three teams, PMC Club Athletico Faisalabad, Baloch Nushki, and Bannu Red earning promotion to the 2006 PFF League. However it is unknown whether it was held again as a third-tier competition.

=== Status evolution ===
Professional leagues
Amateur/Semi-professional leagues

Year	Tier 1	Tier 2	Tier 3	Tier 4	Tier 5 and below	Other leagues (outside the national pyramid)
1992–1994	National A-Division Football Championship	National B-Division Football Championship				Regional leagues
2004–2006	Pakistan Premier League	PFF League				Regional leagues
2006–2021	Pakistan Premier League	PFF League	National Club Championship			Regional leagues

=== Current pyramid ===
Level	League(s)/Division(s)
Tier 1	N/A
Tier 2	N/A
Tier 3	N/A
Other leagues (outside the national pyramid)
-	Regional and city leagues

=== Franchise leagues ===
League	Clubs	Formed	Dissolved
Super Football League	5	2007	2010

== Women's ==
=== System by period ===
There has never been a national women league in Pakistan. The National Women Football Championship, the first national women tournament in Pakistan, was held in 2005. It is held on knock-out basis and a closed format competition.

== See also ==
- Football in Pakistan
