= Kaleemullah Khan =

Kaleemullah Khan may refer to:

- Kaleemullah Khan (field hockey) (born 1958), Pakistani field hockey player
- Kaleemullah Khan (footballer) (born 1992), Pakistani footballer
