= Kaleemullah Khan (footballer) =

Pakistani footballer (born 1992)

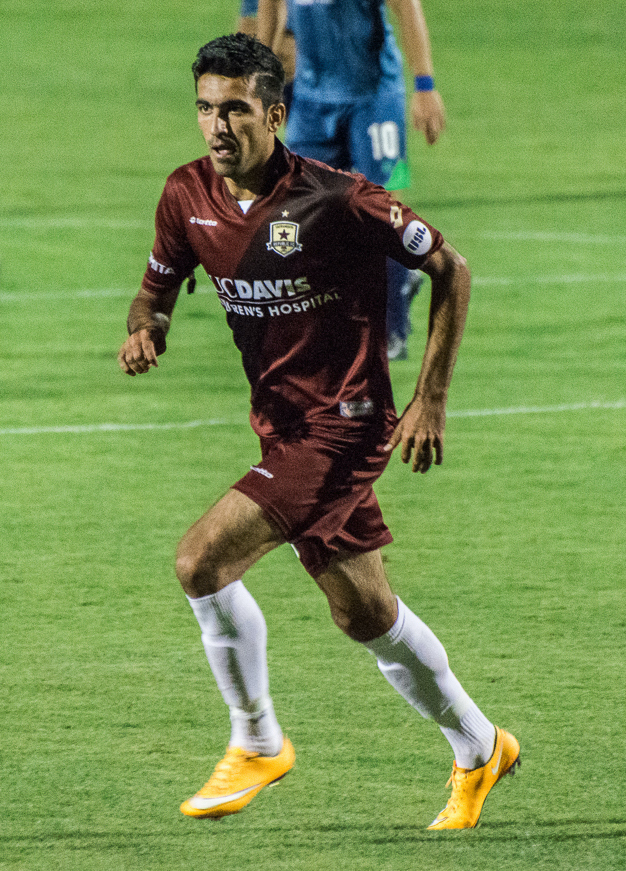
- Kaleemullah playing for Sacramento Republic FC in 2015

Personal information
- Date of birth: 20 September 1992 (age 34)
- Place of birth: Chaman, Pakistan
- Height: 1.78 m (5 ft 10 in)
- Position: Forward

Team information
- Current team: Abdul FC

Youth career
- 2007-2008: Young Afghan

Senior career*
Years	Team	Apps	(Gls)
2008–2009	Afghan Chaman		
2009–2014	Khan Research Laboratories	94	(72)
2014–2015	Dordoi Bishkek	22	(20)
2015	Sacramento Republic FC	8	(0)
2015–2017	Tulsa Roughnecks	24	(1)
2016–2017	→ K-Electric (loan)		
2017–2018	Serhat Ardahanspor	11	(4)
2018–2019	Igdirspor	5	(4)
2019	Araklıspor	2	(2)
2019	Al-Najaf	3	(1)
2019–2021	Zakho	4	(0)
2023–	Abdul FC		

International career^{‡}
2010–2014	Pakistan U23	7	(1)
2011–	Pakistan	29	(5)
Medal record
Khan Research Laboratories
Winner	Pakistan Premier League	2009
Winner	Challenge Cup	2009
Runner-up	Pakistan Premier League	2010
Winner	Challenge Cup	2010
Third place	KPT-PFF Cup	2010
Winner	Pakistan Premier League	2011
Winner	Challenge Cup	2011
Winner	Pakistan Premier League	2012
Winner	Challenge Cup	2012
Runner-up	AFC President's Cup	2013
Winner	Pakistan Premier League	2013
Winner	PFF Fair Play Trophy	2013
Dordoi Bishkek
Winner	Kyrgyzstan League	2014
Winner	Kyrgyzstan Cup	2014
Winner	Kyrgyzstan Super Cup	2014
Winner	Ala-Too Cup	2015
Pakistan
Third place	Philippine Peace Cup	2013
- * Club domestic league appearances and goals as of 1 July 2022 ‡ National team caps and goals as of 2 October 2026

Kaleemullah Khan (Urdu: کلیم الله خان; born 20 September 1992) is a Pakistani professional footballer who plays as a forward for Abdul FC and the Pakistan national team.

He is the first Pakistani footballer to play and score in the United States, and also the first Pakistani player to score 100 career goals in club competitions. He has been praised for his positioning, teamwork and stamina, and has shown consistency in scoring and creating goals.

== Early life ==
Belonging to the Achakzai tribe of ethnic Pashtuns, Khan was born in the city of Chaman, in the Balochistan province of Pakistan. He started playing for his school team, the Government High School Chaman. In the beginning, his parents were not supportive of his interest in the sport due to the lack of football support and infrastructure in the country, but agreed to it when he signed a contract with the club Afghan Chaman.

== Club career ==
=== Khan Research Laboratories ===
==== Early years ====
Khan made his Pakistan Premier League debut for Afghan Chaman in the 2008–09 season. KRL scouted him in a match against the team in 2009 when he came as a substitute and decided to sign him along with his fellow midfielder Mehmood Khan.

He made his debut with KRL on 27 July 2009 in a 3–0 win against PAF F.C., scoring his first goal in the 69th minute. He finished the 2009-10 season with 4 goals in all competitions, as the club won the league and Challenge Cup, and qualified for the AFC President's Cup. During the 2010-11 season, Khan was soon promoted to the first team by KRL manager Sajjad Mehmood. Khan was an important player in KRL's Challenge Cup-winning squad of the 2010-11 season, scoring the second goal of the 4–0 win against Pakistan Navy in the cup final. Khan also made his debut AFC President's Cup on 10 May 2010 in a 2–1 win against Naga Corp from Cambodia, scoring both the goals in the continental club competition.

Khan won the Pakistan Premier League with Khan Research Laboratories in 2012 as KRL set a Pakistan Premier League record scoring the most points in a season in the Pakistan Premier League with 77 points. Khan also won the Challenge Cup with KRL (1–0) against rivals K-Electric in 2011.

==== 2012–13 season ====
During the 2012-13 season, he became involved in the first-team under then manager Tariq Lutfi who replaced manager Sajjad Mahmood the previous season; Khan established himself as a key player – playing almost in every match and scored 35 times to make him the league's all-time record top goal scorer. The club clinched a historic double; winning the league title, the domestic cup and qualified for the AFC President's Cup for the following season – finishing runners-up in the competition losing (1–0) to Turkmenistan's Balkan. Khan finished as the second top goal scorer of the continental cup with 7 goals behind Mirlan Murzaev, scoring 5 goals in an 8–0 group stage win against Yeedzin following with goals in 1–0 victory over Dordoi Bishkek from Kyrgyzstan and a 2–0 win against Hilal Al-Quds from Palestine in the final group stage.

Khan was awarded the player of the year award by Pakistan Football Federation and was declared the best player in the Pakistan Premier League for his performances domestically in the league and internationally at AFC President's Cup in 2013. In the 2013-14 season, Khan won his fourth and last league title with the Rawalpindi side.

=== Dordoi Bishkek ===
==== 2014 season ====
Kaleemullah signed for FC Dordoi Bishkek in 2014, who was soon joined by his former club and Pakistan national team players Muhammad Adil and Saddam Hussain, by former Pakistan coach Zaviša Milosavljević, after his performances in AFC President's Cup 2013 on an initial five-month contract, wearing the Number 9 shirt. After impressing during this five-month stint, Khan extended his contract by signing a new two-year contract with Dordoi in July 2014.

He played a major role in helping the team win a treble; the league title, league cup and super cup, finishing as top goal scorer, scoring 18 goals in 17 appearances in the league with 3 goals out of 3 appearances in the domestic league cup. Khan's remarkable form and greater goals to appearance ratio for Dordoi Bishkek in the Shoro Top League as well as Kyrgyzstan Cup and Kyrgyzstan Super Cup in 2014 edition earned him the best player award in the league by the Football Federation of the Kyrgyz Republic. In total, Kaleemullah finished with 21 goals in 21 matches in the 2014 season for his new club in all competitions.

==== 2015 season ====
Khan made his AFC Cup debut on 9 February 2015 in a 1–0 defeat against Turkmenistan side Ahal in the preliminary round. In an interview with Express Tribune, Khan revealed that he has received letters from Þróttur Reykjavík from Iceland and Chongqing Lifan from China stating that 'they want him to train with the teams for at least a week'. In May, Khan went on trial with United Soccer League side Sacramento Republic for their 2015 season campaign.

=== Sacramento Republic ===
On 18 June 2015 it was announced that Kaleemullah had signed with the Sacramento Republic FC of the USL, the third tier of the United States soccer league system on a four-month contract. At that time, it was believed that he was the first Pakistani-born player to sign a contract with a professional soccer club in the United States.

"The signing of Kaleemullah demonstrates the continued mission of Republic FC to bring the best players from around the world to our Capital City... His scoring prowess is well documented..."

— Sacramento Republic FC Technical Director Graham Smith about the signing of Kaleemullah.

He made his debut for the club on 20 June 2015, two days after signing, entering the match as a 66th-minute substitute for captain Justin Braun. The Republic won that match 2–1. During the match, he made several runs and showed his skill on the ball and eye for passing. He later described the match as a "dream debut."

=== Tulsa Roughnecks ===
On 16 December 2015, Tulsa Roughnecks FC announced the signing of Kaleemullah for the 2016 USL season. In an interview after the move, Kaleemullah said he "couldn't settle in California [with Sacramento]" but that he hoped his transfer would reignite hopes of a "dream move" to the MLS. On May 1, 2016, Khan scored his first goal for his club and first goal on American soil. By doing so, he became the first Pakistani football player to play in US and score there.

"I finally scored a goal and this was important for me. I played as striker for the first time for Roughnecks and scored. Earlier, I was playing as a winger. So this has given me the confidence that I am good enough. I just want to thank everyone who supported me. My coach was very supportive; he took a chance by letting me play as a striker and I delivered a good performance... He was happy for me that I started scoring. He said that this will benefit the team. He also told me that winning or losing is a part of the game and I just need to continue my game."

— Kaleemullah in an interview with The Express Tribune.

==== Loan to K-Electric ====
On 22 December 2016, Dawn in an interview with Kaleemullah reported that he has joined K-Electric on a loan deal from Tulsa Roughnecks until March 2017.

=== Serhat Ardahanspor ===
On 20 September 2017, Kaleem signed for Turkish club Serhat Ardahanspor. The move would make the third country in the career, after previous spells playing in Pakistan, Kyrgyzstan and United States.

=== İzmirspor ===
On 28 July 2018 Khan signed a contract with Turkish club Izmirspor. His signing ceremony was attended by club's President Mustafa Gürkan. However, in August 2018, Khan parted ways with izmirspor because he didn't get international clearance certificate.

=== Igdirspor ===
Khan went on to the sign a contract with a club Igdirspor which played in the same Turkish Regional Amateur League as Izmirspor did. On 23 September 2018, Khan made his debut for the club in a 4–0 win. Khan scored a goal and provided an assist in that match. On October 15, Khan scored in 68th minute against Cayelispor, it marked as Khan's 100th club career goal, making Khan the only Pakistani footballer to achieve this feat.

=== Araklıspor ===
Three months later on 18 January 2019, Kaleemullah moved to Araklıspor in the same regional league, where he had a short stint scoring two goals in two matches.

=== Al-Najaf ===
On 8 March 2019, Khan signed a four-month contract with Iraqi Premier League club Al-Najaf FC for Rs. 5 million. On 4 May, Khan scored his first goal for his club in a 3–2 win over Al-Talaba SC.

=== Zakho ===
On, 24 August 2019, Kaleemullah Khan posted two photos regarding his new club but he didn't disclose his new club's name. Later on, In September 2019, it was announced that Kaleemullah signed to Zakho SC.

In 2020, he received a shin injury during the 2019–20 Iraqi Premier League season which left him unsettled for more than a year. He consequently had to leave the country due to COVID-19 and security issues. The league was postponed due to the 2019–2020 Iraqi protests and the COVID pandemic, and ultimately cancelled on 3 June 2020. He trained at his hometown in Chaman to maintain his fitness level. In October 2021, he recovered from his injury with his contract due to expire in one month, and hinted he had received offers from clubs from Qatar, Russia, United States, and his previous Kyrgyzstan's club Dordoi Bishkek for his next move.

=== Later career ===
After 2021, Khan spent the ensuing years as free agent. In 2023, he started playing for Karachi club Abdul FC. In 2024, he participated in the Futsal National Cup with the club, finalising as runner-up of the phase in Karachi after falling to Forza FC in the final in the penalties.

== International career ==
=== 2010–2015 ===
Khan represented Pakistan at various youth levels, starting with the under-23s in 2010. He was called up to the under-23 team for the 2010 Asian Games making his debut in a 6–0 group stage defeat against Thailand. The following year, he represented the Olympic under-23 team in a test series against Palestine.

With less opportunity to try out new players, and with the national team facing crucial 2012 AFC Challenge Cup qualification, Pakistan manager Tariq Lutfi felt that Khan was needed at the national level. He was called in the senior squad and earned his first senior cap for Pakistan in a 0–3 loss against Turkmenistan on 21 March 2011 at the 2012 AFC Challenge Cup qualification. Throughout the year, he later featured at the 2012 AFC Challenge Cup qualification, 2014 FIFA World Cup qualification and the 2011 SAFF Championship.

At the 2014 AFC Challenge Cup qualification he scored his first international goal against Macau as Pakistan won the match 2–0 on 21 March 2013. He also scored against Bangladesh at the 2013 SAFF Championship in a 2–1 victory, and the opening goal against Philippines at the Philippine Peace Cup in the eventual 1–3 defeat. In 2014, Khan was named captain for the national team for a tour to Lebanon, where he scored the lone goal during a friendly against the Lebanon national team in the eventual 1–3 defeat. Khan also captained the under-23 team at the 2014 Asian Games, and also toured India with the under-23 side recording a goal in a 2–0 victory of arch-rivals India by a free-kick.

Khan was also called up for the qualifiers for the 2018 World Cup against Yemen and played in legs of the matches which were played at neutral venues in March 2015, due to security concerns in their respective countries. Pakistan could not beat the strong Yemen national team and lost 3–1 away in Qatar, and drew 0–0 at the home leg in Bahrain. Pakistan ended up getting knocked out of the World Cup Qualifiers on an aggregate score of 3–1.

=== PFF dispute ===
Khan missed international exposure for the next 3 years, as Pakistan was suspended from all football activities by FIFA on 10 October 2017. For three years since March 2015, Pakistan remained suspended from any international competition because of the crisis created inside the Pakistan Football Federation. Khan along with other national team players meanwhile participated with Pakistan during local Leisure Leagues exhibitions matches involving Brazilian star Ronaldinho and Ryan Giggs in 2017.

Upon return of Pakistan at international stage in 2018, Khan had a dispute with PFF authorities as the former spoke out on the federation's incompetence which ultimately led him not to be selected for the 2018 SAFF Championship. PFF banned the Pakistani players to speak about this matter on any platform. In response, Khan questioned how PFF could implement such an order considering none of the players are centrally contracted to them. To further complicate matters, PFF's Sardar Naveed Haider Khan accused the striker of signing a contract with Turkish fifth-tier side Izmirspor 'for the money' and neglecting national duty. However Khan disagreed by saying "My name was specifically omitted from the list by PFF president because of the statements I'd given about the working of the PFF and it's very petty-minded of them to do that really."

=== 2020– ===
In January 2020, Khan was named in Pakistan's squad for a two-match friendly tour in Malaysia. On 22 January, he scored the opening goal in the 5th minute against UKM in the eventual 2–2 draw. In the second and last match the next day against Felda United, he scored a disallowed goal ruled out in the dying minutes of the match in the eventual 2–0 victory.

In 2022, the Pakistan Football Federation organised trials inviting 90 players for the men's senior team camp after three-and-a-half years of inactivity because of the Pakistan Football Federation's suspension by FIFA, which didn't include Khan, despite him being available and expressing dissatisfaction with his omission. After a perception of his retirement, Khan denied he had retired from football.

In September 2025, Khan recalled to the national football team for their 2027 AFC Asian Cup qualification matches against Afghanistan on 9 & 14 October 2025. At the 2026 FIFA ASEAN Cup, Khan was credited with Pakistan’s second goal in a 4–2 defeat to Vietnam after Ali Akbar Khan’s long-range shot took a final touch off his leg and deflected into the net, marking his fifth senior international goal.

== Style of play ==
Khan is known for being an attacking all-rounder, capable of playing in different forward positions. As he came through the youth system of Young Afghan, he was seen primarily as a left back, often pushing forward to support the attack, which later led to his transition into midfield and then into more advanced roles. After joining Khan Research Laboratories, he shifted his position as a winger and later as centre forward. He has also played on occasions as midfielder.

Khan has been praised for his maturity, pace, technique, awareness and positioning. He has been compared with Lionel Messi due to his goal scoring record by the local media in Pakistan.

== Personal life ==
Kaleemullah is the cousin of former Pakistan national team captain Muhammad Essa Khan. He is also nephew of politician Abdul Khaliq Khan Achakzai. He lost his father in 2010 at the age of 18, when he was at Myanmar at that time playing in the 2010 AFC President's Cup with KRL, which followed the demise of his mother three years earlier in 2007.

In 2017, Khan was named as brand ambassador of Pakistan Super League cricket team Quetta Gladiators alongside MMA fighter Ahmed Mujtaba.

In 2022, Khan acted as convenor of the Sindh Super League, a franchise-based football league held in the province of Sindh.

In 2023, he partnered with Shahzaib Ahmed Khan, the founder of Karachi club Abdul FC, to launch a football facility at the Rahat Football Ground in Clifton, Karachi.

== Career statistics ==
=== Club ===
As of 27 December 2021

Appearances and goals by club, season and competition
Club	Season	League			National Cup^{1}		Continental^{2}		Other^{3}		Total	
Club	Season	Division	Apps	Goals	Apps	Goals	Apps	Goals	Apps	Goals	Apps	Goals
Khan Research Laboratories	2009–10	Pakistan Premier League	—	3	—	1	—		—		—	4
Khan Research Laboratories	2010–11	Pakistan Premier League	—	8	—	1	3	2	—		—	11
Khan Research Laboratories	2011–12	Pakistan Premier League	—	12	—	1	—		—		—	13
Khan Research Laboratories	2012–13	Pakistan Premier League	—	35	6	0	3	0	—		—	35
Khan Research Laboratories	2013–14	Pakistan Premier League	—	18	4	8	6	7	—		—	33
Khan Research Laboratories	Total		94	72	—	11	12	9	—		134	96
Dordoi Bishkek	2014	Shoro Top League	17	18	3	3	0	0	1	0	21	21
Dordoi Bishkek	2015	Shoro Top League	5	2	0	0	1	0	3	0	9	2
Dordoi Bishkek	Total		22	20	3	3	1	0	4	0	30	23
Sacramento Republic	2015	United Soccer League	8	0	0	0	0	0	2	0	9	0
Tulsa Roughnecks	2016	United Soccer League	24	1	1	0	0	0	0	0	24	1
Tulsa Roughnecks	2017	United Soccer League	0	0	0	0	0	0	0	0	0	0
K-Electric (loan)	2016–17	Pakistan Premier League	—		—		—		3	3	3	3
K-Electric (loan)	Total		32	1	1	0	0	0	5	3	36	4
Serhat Ardahanspor	2017–18	Turkish Regional Amateur League	11	4	—		—		—		11	4
Iğdırspor	2018–19	Turkish Regional Amateur League	5	4	—		—		—		5	4
Araklıspor	2018–19	Turkish Regional Amateur League	2	2	—		—		—		2	2
Araklıspor	Total		18	10	—		—		—		18	10
Al-Najaf	2018–19	Iraqi Premier League	3	1	0	0	0	0	0	0	3	1
Zakho	2019–20	Iraqi Premier League	4	0	0	0	0	0	0	0	4	0
Zakho	2020–21	Iraqi Premier League	0	0	0	0	0	0	0	0	0	0
Zakho	Total		7	1	0	0	0	0	0	0	7	1
Career total			173	104	27	14	13	9	9	3	220	133

- 1.Includes statistics from Challenge Cup, Kyrgyzstan Cup, US Open Cup, Turkish Cup and Iraq FA Cup.
- 2.Includes statistics from AFC President's Cup and AFC Cup.
- 3.Includes statistics from NBP President Cup, KPT-PFF Cup, Kyrgyzstan Super Cup, Ala-Too Cup, and Legend Cup.

=== International ===
Appearances and goals by national team and year
National team	Year	Apps	Goals
Pakistan	2011	8	0
Pakistan	2012	1	0
Pakistan	2013	13	3
Pakistan	2014	1	1
Pakistan	2015	2	0
Pakistan	2025	2	0
Pakistan	2026	2	1
Total		29	5

=== International goals ===
Scores and results list Pakistan's goal tally first, score column indicates score after each Khan goal.

List of international goals scored by Kaleemullah Khan
No.	Date	Venue	Opponent	Score	Result	Competition
1	21 March 2013	Spartak Stadium, Bishkek, Kyrgyzstan	Macau	2–0	2–0	2014 AFC Challenge Cup qualification
2	5 September 2013	Halchowk Stadium, Kathmandu, Nepal	Bangladesh	2–1	2–1	2013 SAFF Championship
3	15 October 2013	Panaad Stadium, Bacolod, Philippines	Philippines	1–0	1–3	Philippine Peace Cup
4	19 February 2014	Saida Municipal Stadium, Beirut, Lebanon	Lebanon	1–2	1–3	Friendly
5	2 October 2026	Gelora Bung Karno Stadium, Jakarta, Indonesia	Vietnam	2–3	2–4	2026 FIFA ASEAN Cup

== Honours ==
=== Club ===
Khan Research Laboratories

- Pakistan Premier League: 2009, 2011, 2012, 2013; Runner-up: 2010
- Challenge Cup: 2009, 2010, 2011, 2012
- PFF Fair Play Trophy: 2013
- KPT–PFF Cup Third Place: 2010
- AFC President's Cup Runner-up: 2013

Dordoi Bishkek

- Shoro Top League: 2014
- Kyrgyzstan Cup: 2014
- Kyrgyzstan Super Cup: 2014
- Ala–Too Cup: 2015

K-Electric

- NBP President's Cup Third Place: 2017

=== Country ===
Philippine Peace Cup: Third Place: 2013

=== Individual ===
- Pakistan Premier League Top Goalscorer: 2012 (35 goals)
- Pakistan Premier League Best Player: 2013
- PFF Player of the Year: 2013
- Kyrgyzstan League Top Goalscorer: 2014 (18 goals)
- Kyrgyzstan Football League Best Player: 2014
- First Pakistani football player to be a top scorer for any foreign league outside Pakistan.
- First Pakistan home grown player to play Professional Football in America.
- First Pakistani to score 100 club career goals (42 outside of Pakistan).

=== Records ===
- Record for most Pakistan Premier League goals in a 30-game season: 31 goals
- Record for most hat-tricks scored in the Pakistan Premier League in one season: 7 (2012)
- Record for most goals scored by a Pakistani footballer in Asian competitions (club football): 9 goals
- Dordoi Bishkek Record Goalscorer: 18 goals (5th in Ranking)

== See also ==
- List of Pakistan national football team captains

Awards
Preceded by Saeed Ahmed	PPFL Best Player of the Year; 2013	Succeeded by Mansoor Khan / Muhammad Mujahid
