= PAF Sports Complex, Peshawar =

Pakistan Air Force sports complex in Peshawar

PAF Sports Complex
- Interactive map of PAF Sports Complex
- Address: Peshawar Cantonment, Peshawar, Khyber Pakhtunkhwa, Pakistan
- Coordinates: 33.9956°N 71.5263°E
- Owner: Pakistan Air Force
- Operator: Pakistan Air Force
- Surface: Grass and indoor surfaces

Tenant
- Pakistan Air Force FC

The PAF Sports Complex, is a multi-sport complex operated by the Pakistan Air Force in Peshawar, Khyber Pakhtunkhwa, Pakistan. Located in Peshawar Cantonment, it contains facilities for football, cricket, field hockey, athletics, basketball and volleyball.

The complex has served as a home venue of Pakistan Air Force FC. The complex is separate from the PAF Sports Complex, Islamabad, which has also been used as a home venue by the PAF football team.

== History ==
The complex has undergone expansion and redevelopment. An Auditor General of Pakistan report records that Air Headquarters Unit Peshawar had spent Rs102 million by 2019 on the construction of several sporting components, including cricket and hockey grounds, football grounds, athletics tracks, a basketball court and volleyball facilities.

The PAF Hashim Khan Squash Complex, another Pakistan Air Force sporting venue in Peshawar is separate from the PAF Sports Complex.

== Facilities ==
The complex's facilities include:

- cricket ground
- field hockey ground
- football grounds
- athletics tracks
- basketball court
- volleyball facilities

== Football ==
The football ground has served as one of the home venues of Pakistan Air Force FC. In January 2009, it hosted 2008–09 PFF League matches. During the 2009 Pakistan Premier League, PAF divided its home programme between its complexes in Islamabad and Peshawar. Eight home matches were allocated to the PAF Sports Complex, Islamabad and five to the Peshawar venue. For the following season, the Peshawar complex was selected to stage all 15 of PAF's scheduled home matches.

The complex has also hosted the National Challenge Cup.

== National Games ==
The PAF Sports Complex was one of the venues of the 31st National Games of Pakistan, held in Peshawar in December 2010. It staged the men's and women's netball competitions. The complex also staged the women's karate competition.

For the 2019 National Games, the complex was included among the venues selected across Peshawar. It hosted the men's and women's basketball competitions.

== Basketball ==
The 52nd National Men's Basketball Championship was held at PAF Sports Complex of Peshawar in May 2013, with 12 departmental and regional teams participating.

== See also ==
- Pakistan Air Force FC
- PAF Sports Complex, Islamabad
- List of football stadiums in Pakistan
