= Abdullah Shah (footballer) =

Pakistani footballer

Personal information
- Full name: Syed Abdullah Shah
- Date of birth: 6 February 2001 (age 25)
- Place of birth: Islamabad, Pakistan
- Height: 1.86 m (6 ft 1 in)
- Position: Centre-back

Team information
- Current team: Mehran FC

Youth career
- 2013–2017: Mehran

Senior career*
Years	Team	Apps	(Gls)
2017–2018	POPO FC		
2018–	Mehran		
2021–2022	→ Sui Southern Gas (loan)		
2022–2023	→ Dhivehi Sifainge (loan)		
2024	→ Abu Muslim (loan)	3	(0)
2026	→ Brothers Union (loan)		

International career^{‡}
2023	Pakistan U23	2	(0)
2022–	Pakistan	11	(0)
- * Club domestic league appearances and goals as of 16:40, 23 June 2023 (UTC) ‡ National team caps and goals as of 20:00, 26 September 2026 (UTC)

Syed Abdullah Shah (born 6 February 2001) is a Pakistani professional footballer who plays as a centre-back for Mehran FC and the Pakistan national team.

== Club career ==
=== Early career ===
Shah started his youth career with Mehran FC in 2013, and was selected by the Islamabad under-14 team for youth national championships after trials. In May 2017, Shah was shortlisted in the Islamabad Football Association squad for their tour in Gothia Cup held in Shenyang, China while playing for Mehran. In August 2017, he captained the Islamabad team in the Gothia Cup, where he scored a goal in a 12–0 win against Rising Sun Soccer Academy from India. The team were crowned champions after defeating FC Zhaoqing Lixun from China by 7–6 in the penalties. Shah was also named player of the tournament.

=== POPO FC ===
Abdullah then moved to POPO FC, playing often as a right-back, and becoming a regular call up for the senior squad at the age of 16. He was subsequently called by Pakistan Premier League department Khan Research Laboratories in November 2017, but the move seemingly failed to materialise.

=== Mehran ===
In 2018, Shah returned to his youth club Mehran FC.

==== Loan to Sui Southern Gas ====
Shah joined the departmental side Sui Southern Gas in 2021. He made 4 appearances in the 2021–22 Pakistan Premier League until the league was cancelled shortly after starting.

Following the cancellation of the league, Shah returned to Mehran.

==== Loan to Dhivehi Sifainge ====
In July 2022, he joined Dhivehi Sifainge in the Maldivian Second Division.

==== Loan to Abu Muslim ====
On 2 February 2024, Shah joined Afghanistan Champions League club Abu Muslim on a one-season deal, joining national team fellow Shayak Dost.

==== Loan to Brothers Union ====
In January 2026, Shah joined the Bangladeshi football club Brothers Union for the second round of the Bangladesh Football League.

== International career ==
In 2015, Shah represented Pakistan at youth level in the AFC Under-14 Football Festival in Dushanbe.

In August 2022, Shah was called up for a trials with the senior national team. In November the same year, he was included in Pakistan's squad for a friendly against Nepal, Pakistan's first fixture in nearly three-and-a-half years because of the Pakistan Football Federation's suspension by FIFA. He went on to make his debut in the eventual 0–1 defeat. In October 2023 he represented Pakistan U23 in AFC U23 Asian Cup Qualifiers.

== Futsal career ==
Alongside his football career, Shah also played futsal at club level. In July 2017, Shah participated in the Neymar Jr’s 5 tournament with Chitral futsal club Highlanders FC in Brazil. Shah started playing for Team Eighteen in Islamabad since the establishment of the club in 2018. He also played for the futsal section of Abdul FC during his stay at the club from 2020 to 2021.

== Career statistics ==
=== International ===
As of 26 September 2026

Appearances and goals by national team and year
National team	Year	Apps	Goals
Pakistan	2022	1	0
Pakistan	2023	3	0
Pakistan	2025	3	0
Pakistan	2026	4	0
Total		11	0

== Honours ==
Pakistan

- Diamond Jubilee International Football Tournament: 2026
