= 2010 PFF League =

PFF League
- Season: 2010
- Dates: 22 November – 15 December
- Champions: Pakistan Police
- Promoted: Pakistan Police; Muslim
- Matches: 32
- Goals: 77 (2.41 per match)
- Top goalscorer: Asif Hameed (6 goals)
- Biggest home win: Pakistan Railways 4–0 Ashraf Sugar Mills (29 November 2010); Pakistan Railways 4–0 Pakistan Steel (9 December 2010)
- Biggest away win: Baloch Quetta 0–3 Muslim (12 December 2010)
- Highest scoring: Ravi 4–1 Stars (22 November 2011); Baloch Quetta 2–3 University (8 December 2010); Muslim 3–2 Afghan Sports (8 December 2010); Gwadar Port Authority 2–3 Pakistan Public Work Dept. (29 November 2010)
- Longest winning run: 7 games Pakistan Police
- All statistics correct as of December 15, 2010.

The 2010 PFF League (PFFL) was the 7th season of second tier of Pakistan Football Federation. The season started on 22 November 2010 and concluded on 17 December 2010.

== Teams ==
A total of 18 teams contested the league. 8 teams played via Departmental route and 10 played from club route.

=== Promoted (pre-season) ===
University Football Club and Al Hilal Club from Arifwala promoted from Punjab Inter-Division Club Championship.

=== Relegation (pre-season) ===
Baloch Quetta and PMC Athletico were relegated from 2009-10 Pakistan Premier League season.

Teams relegated from the 2009-10 Pakistan Premier League

- Baloch Quetta
- PMC Athletico

== Club phase ==
=== Region round ===
Team	Pld	W	D	L	GF	GA	GD	Pts
Ravi	2	2	0	0	4	1	+3	6
Stars	2	1	0	1	1	4	−3	3
Gilgit	2	0	0	2	0	0	0	0

- Ravi will face Al-Hilal and Afghan Sports in Group B.
22 November 2010
14:00 UTC+05:00

Ravi	4–1	Stars
Muhammad Rahil 16'; Muhammad Asif 32'; Enika 69', 83'		Faisal Kabir 20'

Jinnah Stadium, Islamabad
23 November 2010
14:00 UTC+05:00

Stars	w/o	Gilgit
	Report

Jinnah Stadium, Islamabad
24 November 2010
14:00 UTC+05:00

Ravi	w/o	Gilgit
	Report

Jinnah Stadium, Islamabad

=== Round One ===
- Baloch Quetta, Muslim & Wohaib bye to Super League.

==== Group A ====
Team	Pld	W	D	L	GF	GA	GD	Pts
University	2	2	0	0	0	0	0	6
Suraj	2	0	0	2	0	0	0	0

29 November 2010
14:00 UTC+05:00

University	w/o	Suraj
	Report

Agriculture University Ground, Faisalabad
1 December 2010
14:00 UTC+05:00

University	w/o	Suraj
	Report

Agriculture University Ground, Faisalabad
- University won both games on walkover.
- University qualified to Super League.

==== Group B ====
Team	Pld	W	D	L	GF	GA	GD	Pts
Afghan Sports	2	2	0	0	2	0	+2	6
Al Hilal Arifwala	2	1	0	1	2	2	0	3
Ravi	2	0	0	2	0	0	0	0

27 November 2010
14:00 UTC+05:00

Al Hilal Arifwala	0–2	Afghan Sports
		Zahoor Ahmed 77'; Muhammad Arif 88'

Govt MC High School Ground, Arifwala
29 November 2010
14:00 UTC+05:00

Al Hilal Arifwala	2–0	Ravi
Asim Nasir 26'; Shahid Gill 88'

Govt MC High School Ground, Arifwala
1 December 2010
14:00 UTC+05:00

Afghan	w/o	Ravi
	Report

Govt MC High School Ground, Arifwala
- Afghan Sports qualified to Super League.

=== Super League (Club) ===
All matches for Club phase of Super League were held in Lahore.

Team	Pld	W	D	L	GF	GA	GD	Pts
Muslim (P)	4	3	1	0	8	3	+5	10
Wohaib	4	2	2	0	3	1	+2	8
University	4	2	1	1	4	3	+1	7
Afghan Sports	4	0	1	3	2	5	−3	1
Baloch Quetta	4	0	1	3	2	7	−5	1

(P) Promoted
6 December 2010
14:00 UTC+05:00

Muslim	1–0	University
Saeed Ahmed

Old Campus Ground
6 December 2010
14:00 UTC+05:00

Wohaib	1–0	Afghan Sports
Muhammad Asif 75'

Railways Stadium, Lahore

8 December 2010
14:00 UTC+05:00

Baloch Quetta	2–3	University
Wahid 38'; Goran 73'		M. Usman 55'; Adil Ali 80'; Imran Mushtaq 90'

Punjab Stadium, Lahore
8 December 2010
14:00 UTC+05:00

Muslim	3–2	Afghan Sports
Saeed Ahmed 27', 67'; Haji Muhammad 45+2'		Muhammad Yaqoob 7', 90+3'

Railways Stadium, Lahore

10 December 2010
14:00 UTC+05:00

Afghan Sports	0–1	University
Ali Adil 15'

Punjab Stadium, Lahore
10 December 2010
14:00 UTC+05:00

Wohaib	1–0	Baloch Quetta
Asad 37'

Railways Stadium, Lahore

12 December 2010
14:00 UTC+05:00

Baloch Quetta	0–3	Muslim
		Hayatullah 4', 73'; Saeed Ahmed 69'

Punjab Stadium, Lahore
12 December 2010
14:00 UTC+05:00

Wohaib	0–0	University

Railways Stadium, Lahore

14 December 2010
14:00 UTC+05:00

Muslim	1–1	Wohaib
Hayatullah 31'

Punjab Stadium, Lahore
14 December 2010
14:00 UTC+05:00

Afghan Sports	0–0	Baloch Quetta

Railways Stadium, Lahore

== Departmental phase ==
=== Group stage ===
==== Group A ====
All matches held in Karachi.

Team	Pld	W	D	L	GF	GA	GD	Pts
Pakistan Police (Q)	3	3	0	0	4	1	+3	9
Pakistan Steel (Q)	3	2	1	0	4	3	+1	7
Pakistan Public Work Department	3	1	1	1	3	3	0	4
Afghan Sports	3	0	0	3	3	7	−4	0

(Q) Qualified for the phase indicated
- Pakistan Police and Pakistan Steel qualified to Super League.
29 November 2010
14:00 UTC+05:00

Gwadar Port Authority	2–3	Pakistan Public Work Department
Wahid Rehman 46'; Tariq Badal 80'		Muhammad Kamran 24'; Noor Muhammad 28'; Muhammad Atif 71'

Quaid-e-Azam Park Ground, Karachi
29 November 2010
14:00 UTC+05:00

Pakistan Police	2–1	Pakistan Steel
Wasim Abbas 24'; Syed Bilal Shah 71'		Muhammad Amin 69'

All Brothers Football Stadium, Faisalabad

1 December 2010
23:30 UTC+05:00

Pakistan Police	1–0	Pakistan Public Work Department
Syed Bilal Shah 43'

Quaid-e-Azam Park Ground, Karachi
1 December 2010
11:30 UTC+05:00

Gwadar Port Authority	1–3	Pakistan Steel
Wahid Rehman 15'		Muhammad Amin 27', 45'; Ahmed Ali 35'

All Brothers Football Stadium, Faisalabad

3 December 2010
23:30 UTC+05:00

Gwadar Port Authority	0–1	Pakistan Police
Wasim Abbas 56'

Quaid-e-Azam Park Ground, Karachi
3 December 2010
11:30 UTC+05:00

Pakistan Steel	0–0	Pakistan Public Work Department

All Brothers Football Stadium, Faisalabad

==== Group B ====
All matches held in Islamabad.

Team	Pld	W	D	L	GF	GA	GD	Pts
Pakistan Railways (Q)	3	2	1	0	7	1	+6	7
Pakistan Television (Q)	3	2	1	0	6	1	+5	7
Zarai Taraqiati	3	1	0	2	2	5	−3	3
Ashraf Sugar Mills	3	0	0	3	1	9	−8	0

(Q) Qualified for the phase indicated
- Pakistan Railways and Pakistan Television qualified to Super League.
29 November 2010
14:00 UTC+05:00

Pakistan Railways	4–0	Ashraf Sugar Mills
Muhammad Afzal 68'; Zaheer Abbas 79', 85', 86'

Jinnah Sports Stadium, Islamabad
29 November 2010
11:30 UTC+05:00

Pakistan Television	2–0	Zarai Taraqiati
Akmal Shahzad 43'; Sanaullah 87'

Jinnah Sports Stadium, Islamabad

1 December 2010
14:00 UTC+05:00

Zarai Taraqiati	2–1	Ashraf Sugar Mills
Iftikhar Ali Khan 32'; Izharullah 68'		Ahmed Ali 72'

Jinnah Sports Stadium, Islamabad
1 December 2010
11:30 UTC+05:00

Pakistan Railways	1–1	Pakistan Television
Zaheer Abbas 86'	Report	Sanaullah 44'

Jinnah Sports Stadium, Islamabad

3 December 2010
11:30 UTC+05:00

Zarai Taraqiati	0–2	Pakistan Railways
	Report	Asif Hameed 21', 56'

Jinnah Sports Stadium, Islamabad
3 December 2010
14:00 UTC+05:00

Pakistan Television	3–0	Ashraf Sugar Mills
Sanaullah 11'; Akmal Shahzad 29', 78'	Report

Jinnah Sports Stadium, Islamabad

=== Super League (Department) ===
All matches held in Lahore:

Team	Pld	W	D	L	GF	GA	GD	Pts
Pakistan Police (P)	3	3	0	0	4	1	+3	9
Pakistan Railways	3	2	0	1	7	3	+4	6
Pakistan Television	3	0	1	2	3	5	−2	1
Pakistan Steel	3	0	1	2	2	7	−5	1

(P) Promoted
7 December 2010
14:00 UTC+05:00

Pakistan Police	1–0	Pakistan Television
Wasim Abbas 35'

Railway Stadium, Lahore

9 December 2010
14:00 UTC+05:00

Pakistan Railways	4–0	Pakistan Steel
Muhammad Afzal 16'; Rizwan 52'; Asif Hameed 57', 88'

Railway Stadium, Lahore

10 December 2010
14:00 UTC+05:00

Pakistan Police	1–0	Pakistan Steel
Asad 90+2'

Railway Stadium, Lahore

11 December 2010
14:00 UTC+05:00

Pakistan Television	1–2	Pakistan Railways
Akmal Shahzad 22'		Muhammad Afzal 11'; Asif Hameed 57'

Railway Stadium, Lahore

13 December 2010
14:00 UTC+05:00

Pakistan Television	2–2	Pakistan Steel
Ilyas Ahmed 5' (o.g.); Fakhr-e-Alam 45+2'		Muhammad Amin 20'; Abdul Wahab 40'

Railway Stadium, Lahore

14 December 2010
14:00 UTC+05:00

Pakistan Police	2–1	Pakistan Railways
Sher Hassan 47'; Nasib 78'		Asif Hameed 63'

Railway Stadium, Lahore

=== Final ===
15 December 2010
14:00 UTC+05:00

Pakistan Police	2–1	Muslim
Muhammad Hanif 10'; Sanaullah 61'		Hazrat Ali 25'

Railway Stadium, Lahore

== Statistics ==
=== Top scorers ===
As of 15 December 2010

Rank	Player	Club	Goals
1	Asif Hameed	Pakistan Railways	6
2	Zaheer Abbas	Pakistan Railways	4
2	Sanaullah	Pakistan Police	4
2	Saeed Ahmed	Muslim	4
5	Wasim Abbas	Pakistan Police	3
5	Akmal Shahzad	Pakistan Television	3
5	Muhammad Afzal	Pakistan Railways	3

=== Hat-tricks ===
As of 15 December 2010

#.	Player	Club	Against	Score	Date
1	Zaheer Abbas	Pakistan Railways	Ashraf Sugar Mills	4–0	28 November 2010
