= Fareed Ullah =

Pakistani footballer

Personal information
- Full name: Fareed Ullah Khan
- Date of birth: 1 January 2001 (age 25)
- Place of birth: Chaman, Pakistan
- Position: Forward

Team information
- Current team: WAPDA

Youth career
- Khyber Afghan

Senior career*
Years	Team	Apps	(Gls)
2016–2020	Pak Afghan		
2020–2021	Masha United		
2021–2025	Muslim FC		
2024	→ Abu Muslim (loan)		
2025–	WAPDA		

International career^{‡}
2023–2025	Pakistan U23	3	(0)
2023–	Pakistan	10	(0)
- * Club domestic league appearances and goals ‡ National team caps and goals as of 10 June 2025 (UTC)

Fareed Ullah Khan (born 1 January 2001) is a Pakistani professional footballer who plays as a forward for WAPDA and the Pakistan national team.

== Club career ==
=== Early career ===
Fareed started his youth career with local club Khyber Afghan FC, and joined PFF league side Pak Afghan Chaman in 2016.

=== Masha United ===
Fareed made his debut with Masha United in the 2020 PFF National Challenge Cup. He scored a goal in the 12th minute on his debut in a 1–3 loss against SSGC. He scored again with a penalty in a 1–2 defeat against SA Gardens, as his team exited the tournament after two defeats in a row.

=== Muslim ===
He joined Muslim FC in the 2021–22 season of the Pakistan Premier League. He scored 2 goals in 12 appearances through the season, until the league was cancelled shortly after starting. He scored on his debut in a 1–0 victory against Navy, and again against Army.

In 2023, Fareed participated in the 2023 PFF National Challenge Cup under departmental team Asia Ghee Mills, scoring in the group stages against Pakistan Railways in a 3–1 victory as the team advanced through the round.

==== Loan to Abu Muslim ====
On 2 November 2024, Fareed joined Afghanistan Champions League club Abu Muslim on a one-season deal.

=== WAPDA ===
Fareed joined departmental side WAPDA in 2025. He played a crucial role for the bronze medal at the 2025 National Games.

== International career ==
Fareed was first called by Pakistan at the youth level for the 2024 AFC U-23 Asian Cup qualification in September 2023. He went on to make three appearances in the campaign.

He made his senior international debut in the FIFA 2026 World Cup qualifiers as a starter against Cambodia in the first leg in Phnom Penh, where Pakistan contested in a goalless 0–0 draw. He played his second match in their second leg, where he made an assist in a 1–0 win against Cambodia in Islamabad, recording Pakistan first-ever victory in World Cup qualifiers in their first fixture in home after 8 years, and qualifying for the second round for the first time.

== Career statistics ==
=== International ===
As of 10 June 2025

Appearances and goals by national team and year
National team	Year	Apps	Goals
Pakistan	2023	4	0
Pakistan	2024	4	0
Pakistan	2025	2	0
Total		10	0
