= PAF Sports Complex, Islamabad =

Pakistan Air Force Sports complex in Islamabad

PAF Sports Complex
- مجتمع ورزشی پی اے ایف
- Interactive map of PAF Sports Complex
- Full name: Pakistan Air Force Sports Complex
- Address: Sector E-9; Islamabad; Pakistan
- Coordinates: 33.7193°N 73.0140°E
- Owner: Pakistan Air Force
- Operator: Pakistan Air Force
- Surface: Grass

Tenant
- Pakistan Air Force FC

The PAF Sports Complex, is a multi-sport complex operated by the Pakistan Air Force in Sector E-9, Islamabad, Pakistan. Its facilities include separate football and cricket grounds, tennis courts and athletics training facilities.

The football ground serves as a home venue of Pakistan Air Force FC in national competitions, while the cricket ground has regularly hosted blind-cricket tournaments. The complex is separate from the PAF Sports Complex, Peshawar, which has also been used as a home venue by the PAF football team. Other PAF sporting facilities include the PAF Skyview Golf and Sports Complex in Lahore Cantonment and facilities at PAF installations in Risalpur and Karachi.

== Facilities ==
The Complex ground regularly hosts football and cricket matches.

Synthetic tennis courts at the complex have been used for national-team training and selection activities. Athletics training has also been conducted at the sports complex. In October 2018, the complex hosted a three-match Asian-style kabaddi series between the Pakistan Air Force and the Sri Lanka Air Force. PAF won the series 3–0.

== Football ==
The complex was used during the final stage of the 2007–08 PFF League, with the competition's Super Six phase concluding in Islamabad in January 2008.

For the 2009 Pakistan Premier League, the Pakistan Football Federation allocated eight of PAF's 13 home matches to the Islamabad complex. The team's remaining five home fixtures were assigned to a separate PAF Sports Complex, Peshawar.

== Cricket ==
The cricket ground has been particularly associated with blind cricket. It hosted the PAF T20 Blind Cricket Champions Trophy on multiple occasions, including the 2012, 2013, 2016 and 2018 editions.

In 2022, the ground was one of two Islamabad venues selected for the National Bank of Pakistan T20 Blind Cricket Trophy. It was again used during the 2023 edition of the competition, alongside Shalimar Cricket Ground. A separate PAF National T20 Blind Cricket Champions Trophy was staged at the complex from December 2022 to January 2023, with teams representing Peshawar, Azad Jammu and Kashmir, Gujranwala and Islamabad.

== See also ==
- Pakistan Air Force FC
- PAF Sports Complex, Peshawar
- Naval Sports Complex, Islamabad
- List of football stadiums in Pakistan
