= 2008–09 PFF League =

PFF League
- Season: 5th
- Dates: 29 November 2008 – 11 March 2009
- Champions: Baloch Nushki
- Promoted: Baloch Nushki; Pakistan Air Force

The 2008–09 PFF League was the 5th season of Pakistan Football Federation League, second tier of Pakistan Football Federation. The season started on 28 December 2008 concluded on 11 March 2009.

== Departmental leg ==
=== Group A ===
Pos	Team	Pld	W	D	L	GF	GA	GD	Pts
1	Sui Southern Gas Company	3	1	2	0	4	2	+2	4
2	Sindh Government Press	3	1	2	0	4	3	+1	4
3	Pakistan Public Works Department	3	1	1	1	4	5	-1	3
4	Pakistan Police	3	0	1	2	2	4	-2	1

28 December 2008

Pakistan Public Works Department	2–1	Pakistan Police
	Report

30 December 2008

Sindh Government Press	2–1	Pakistan Police
	Report

1 January 2009

Sui Southern Gas Company	0–0	Pakistan Police
	Report

12 January 2009

Sindh Government Press	1–1	Pakistan Public Works Department
	Report

14 January 2009

Sindh Government Press	1–1	Sui Southern Gas Company
	Report

16 January 2009

Sui Southern Gas Company	3–1	Pakistan Public Works Department
	Report

17 January 2009

Pakistan Railways	5–2	Higher Education Commission
	Report

=== Group B ===
Pos	Team	Pld	W	D	L	GF	GA	GD	Pts
1	Pakistan Air Force	3	1	2	0	4	2	+2	4
2	Pakistan Railways	3	1	2	0	4	3	+1	4
3	ELBA Pure Water	3	1	1	1	4	5	-1	3
4	Higher Education Commission	3	0	1	2	2	4	-2	1

31 December 2008

Pakistan Air Force	0–0	Pakistan Railways
	Report

3 January 2009

ELBA Pure Water	0–1	Pakistan Railways
	Report

12 January 2009

Pakistan Air Force	5–0	Higher Education Commission
	Report

14 January 2009

ELBA Pure Water	1–1	Higher Education Commission
	Report

19 January 2009

Pakistan Air Force	2–0	ELBA Pure Water
	Report

=== Semi-finals ===
24 January 2009

Pakistan Railways	1–0	Sui Southern Gas Company
	Report

24 January 2009

Pakistan Air Force	2–0	Sindh Government Press
	Report

=== Final ===
31 January 2009

Pakistan Air Force	2–1	Pakistan Railways
	Report

== Club leg ==
=== Group A ===
Pos	Team	Pld	W	D	L	GF	GA	GD	Pts
1	Baloch Nushki	2	2	0	0	7	0	+7	4
2	Mehran	2	1	0	1	3	3	0	2
3	Karachi Kickers	2	0	0	2	0	7	-7	0
4	Lakki Karawan (W)								

=== Group B ===
Pos	Team	Pld	W	D	L	GF	GA	GD	Pts
1	Muslim	3	2	1	0	8	2	+6	5
2	Wohaib	3	2	0	1	6	5	+1	4
3	Young Baloch	3	1	0	2	2	7	-5	2
4	Nowshera Eleven	3	0	1	2	1	3	-2	1

=== Semi-finals ===
27 February 2009

Baloch Nushki	v	Wohaib
	Wohaib lost due to DNS

Sibi Stadium, Sibi
27 February 2009

Muslim	2–1	Mehran
	Report

Sibi Stadium, Sibi

=== Final ===
1 March 2009

Baloch Nushki	1–0	Muslim
	Report

Sibi Stadium, Sibi

== Grand-final ==
11 March 2009

Baloch Nushki	1–0	Pakistan Air Force
Najeebullah (33')	Report

Jinnah Stadium, Islamabad
