= Pakistan Television F.C. =

Pakistani football club

Pakistan Television
- Full name: Pakistan Television Football Club
- Short name: PTV
- Dissolved: 2019; 7 years ago
- Owner: Pakistan Television
| Home colours | Away colours |

Pakistan Television Football Club, commonly referred to as PTV F.C., served as the football section of the state-owned Pakistan Television Corporation. The club used to compete in the Pakistan Premier League.

== History ==
In 2002, the club played Huma FC in the finals of Jashn-e-Azadi Sports Festival, winning the match 2–1.

=== Pakistan Premier League Era ===
==== Success and promotion ====
In 2005–06 the club entered the newly formed second division, the Football Federation League. Placed in Group C with Pakistan Railways and Pakistan Ordnance Factory, they failed to progress after finishing bottom of the group, losing three games and drawing one.

In 2006–07, Pakistan Television topped their group in the Football Federation League and defeated Dera XI 3–1 in the finals to progress to the second stage. They finished second in their group in the second stage and qualified for semi-finals of the tournament. They defeated Sui Southern Gas 1–0 in the semi-finals and routed PMC Athletico 4–0 in the finals, winning the Football Federation League and getting promoted to Pakistan Premier League.

==== Top-flight and downfall: 2007 to 2009 ====
The club's first match in the top-division was a 3–0 loss to WAPDA. On 4 November, the club defeated Pakistan Railways 2–1 to record their first ever top-division victory. On 24 November, the club suffered their biggest defeat, losing 6–0 to Pakistan Army. The club ended their first season in Pakistan Premier League at 11th position with 23 points, just 2 points above the relegated rivals Pakistan Railways. The club was selected for 2008 National Football Challenge Cup but withdrew from the competition. for unknown reasons.

In the 2008–09 season, the club went on to 15 consecutive defeats before defeating Pakistan Navy 2–1 on the 16th match-day. After finishing two more matches as the 2–2 and 0–0 draw, the club went on to lose remaining seven matches as they finished bottom of the table with just 5 points (from 1 win and 2 draws), it is also the lowest points ever earned by team in the history of Pakistan Premier League.

=== Second division ===
In 2009–10 season, the club topped their group in the Football Federation League to qualify for the finals. They lost 1–0 to Sui Southern Gas and failed to get promoted back to Pakistan Premier League. The club qualified for the final stages of 2010–11 Pakistan Football Federation League, they finished third in their group, failing to get promotion. In the 2011–12 Pakistan Football Federation League the club topped their initial group to qualify for final stages, however the club finished two point behind rivals Zarai Taraqiati. The 2012–13 Football Federation League season was their worst second division ever as they lost 3 and draw 1 out of 4 matches, with scoring 2 goals and conceding 8 as they finished bottom of the initial group. In 2013–14, Pakistan Television were placed in group with Higher Education Commission and Bhatti United, and were favorites to top the group, however the club lost both the matches and finished bottom of the group. In 2014–15 season the club topped their initial group, winning both their games, in the final stages they lost all three matches, conceding 10 goals and scoring zero. The club last competed at the 2019 PFF National Challenge Cup.

=== Inactivity and attempted revival ===
Following a period of inactivity, Pakistan Television announced the reactivation of its sports activities including football, hockey and other sports teams on 22 June 2022, after a three-year hiatus. However, the football team did not make a confirmed return to national competition. In December 2024, PTV was among several departments that had yet to restore their football teams despite government directives to revive departmental sports in 2022, after the shutdown of departmental sports in Pakistan a year before.

== Notable players ==
The players below had senior international cap(s) for their respective countries. Players whose name is listed, represented their countries before or after playing for Pakistan Television.

Asia

- (Afghanistan) Shamsuddin Amiri (2001–03)

== Honours ==
- Football Federation League: 1

2006–07
