= Nushki Stadium =

Football stadium in Pakistan

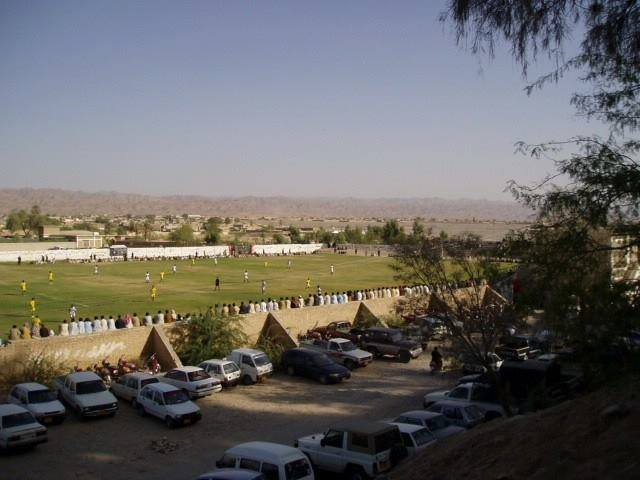
- Interactive map of Nushki Stadium
- Location: Nushki, Pakistan
- Coordinates: 29°33′24″N 66°01′37″E
- Capacity: 1,000
- Surface: Grass

Tenant
- Baloch FC Nushki

Nushki Stadium is an association football stadium in Nushki, Balochistan, Pakistan. It has serves as home ground for Baloch FC Nushki, and has hosted top-flight Pakistan Premier League fixtures.

== See also ==
- List of football stadiums in Pakistan
