= Muslim FC =

Pakistani football club

Muslim
- Full name: Muslim Football Club
- Short name: MFC
- Founded: 2010; 16 years ago
- Stadium: Govt High School Ground; Jamal Nasir Stadium
- Capacity: 12,000
- Manager: Muhammad Eshaq
- League: Pakistan Premier League
Home colours	Away colours

Muslim Football Club is a Pakistani professional football club based in Chaman, Balochistan that competes in the Pakistan Premier League.

== History ==
=== Origins ===
The team had been active locally since 1994–95, operating on community support with many players holding day jobs, and serving as a pathway to departmental teams.

=== Entry to PFF league and promotion (2010) ===
Muslim FC first entered national competition in 2010, and played in the Football Federation League, the second division of Pakistani football. In 2010 Pakistan Football Federation League, the club was placed with local rivals Afghan Sports and Baloch Quetta, along with University Football Club and Wohaib. The club won their first game defeating University Football Club 1–0. In their second and third matches, the club defeated local rivals Afghan Sports and Baloch Quetta 3–2 and 3–0, respectively. The club's last group stage match ended in a 1–1 draw against Wohaib. The club topped their group and earned promotion to 2011–12 Pakistan Premier League. The club also faced the winner of departmental leg, Pakistan Police to determine the trophy winner of the 2010 PFF League, where Muslim ultimately lost the match.

=== Pakistan Premier League (2011–present) ===
The club regularly featured in the top tier, being few of the football clubs that gave competition to well-established departmental sides which dominated the Pakistan football domestic structure in the early years. Despite playing in the top-tier, the club remained semi-professional, with most of the players having another source of income besides playing football.

In 2017, Muslim Football Club defeated Chashma Green to win the All Pakistan Peace Tournament.

The team returned for the 2018–19 Pakistan Premier League season after years of Pakistan Football Federation turmoil and football inactivity, finishing 10th in the table.

In 2023, Muslim FC was shortlisted by the Pakistan Football Federation to compete in a three-team playoff, alongside Baloch Nushki and Afghan Chaman, for Pakistan's sole entry in the inaugural SAFF Club Championship expected to launch in 2024. Eventually, with no club meeting the financial and requirements in time, Pakistan forfeited its slot and the tournament also didn't launch.

== Stadium ==
Like several Pakistan domestic football teams, Afghan Chaman have not own a dedicated ground. Hence the team used several municipal venues in Chaman for its home fixtures. The club usually have used Govt High School Ground and Jamal Nasir Stadium for its home fixtures for the Pakistan Premier League.

== Rivalries ==
=== Chaman Derby ===
Muslim FC shares rivalry with fellow hometown club Afghan Chaman, which have managed to command the highest crowds in Pakistani domestic football.

=== Quetta-Chaman Derby ===
Muslim FC and Baloch FC Quetta contest the Quetta–Chaman rivalry, which is regarded as one of the most prominent fixtures in Balochistan football and is often framed as a contest for provincial supremacy.

== Players ==
=== Current squad ===
As of 14 August 2021

Note: Flags indicate national team as defined under FIFA eligibility rules; some limited exceptions apply. Players may hold more than one non-FIFA nationality.

No.	Pos.	Nation	Player
1	GK	PAK	Naqeebullah
2	DF	PAK	Raheemullah
3	DF	PAK	Hazrat Umar Khan
4	DF	PAK	Wali Khan
5	DF	PAK	Mairaj-ud-Din
6	DF	PAK	Abdul Khaliq
7	MF	PAK	Hikmatullah
8	MF	PAK	Asmatullah (captain)
9	MF	PAK	Muhammad Jamil

No.	Pos.	Nation	Player
11	FW	PAK	Fareed Ullah
12	DF	PAK	Mohammad Arif
13	MF	PAK	Abdul Qahir
14	DF	PAK	Parvaiz Khan
20	MF	PAK	Siraj-ud-Din
22	GK	PAK	Raheemullah
23	MF	PAK	Syed Sanaullah
25	MF	PAK	Kaleemullah

== Personnel ==
=== Current technical staff ===
As of August 2023

Position	Name
Assistant Coach	(Pakistan) Abdul Qadeer Sr
Team Manager	(Pakistan) Muhammad Eshaq
Assistant Team Manager	(Pakistan) Mohammad Rafique

== Coaching history ==
- (Pakistan) Muhammad Dawood (2011–2013)
- (Pakistan) Khalid Nawaz (2014)
- Unknown (2015–2020)
- (Pakistan) Abdul Qadeer (2021–present)

== Competitive record ==
The club's competitive records since the 2010–11 season are listed below.

Season	Div	Tms	Pos	National Challenge Cup	AFC President's Cup	AFC Cup
2010–11	Football Federation League	22	2	DNP	DNP	DNP
2011–12	Pakistan Premier League	16	6	DNP	DNP	DNP
2012–13	Pakistan Premier League	16	3	DNP	DNP	DNP
2013–14	Pakistan Premier League	16	7	DNP	DNP	DNP
2014–15	Pakistan Premier League	12	9	DNP	DNP	DNP
2018–19	Pakistan Premier League	16	10	DNP	DNP	DNP

== Honours ==
- All Pakistan Peace Tournament
  - Winners (1): 2017
