= Pak Elektron Limited FC =

Pakistani football club

Pak Elektron
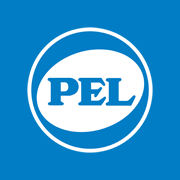
- Full name: Pak Elektron Football Club
- Nickname: Elektrons
- Dissolved: 2012; 14 years ago
- Ground: Model Town Football Ground; Raiders FC Ground
- Owner: Pak Elektron Ltd.
Home colours	Away colours

Pak Elektron Football Club served as the football section of Pakistani appliance and electronics company Pak Elektron Limited. The club was based in Lahore and played its home games at Punjab Stadium.

== History ==
The club were the champions at the 2007–08 PFF League, and gained promotion to the 2008 Pakistan Premier League along with the second-placed Pakistan Steel.

The club last competed in the 2011 Pakistan Premier League, when they were relegated at the end of the season. Soon after, their parent company dissolved the team.

== Stadium ==
Like several Pakistan domestic football teams, Pak Elektron did not own a dedicated ground. Hence the team used several municipal venues in Lahore for its home fixtures. The club usually used Model Town Football Academy Ground in Model Town, or Raiders FC Ground for its home fixtures for the Pakistan Premier League.

== Honours ==
- Football Federation League
  - Champions (1): 2007–08
