= Afghan FC (Chaman) =

Pakistani football club

- Full name: Afghan Football Club Chaman
- Short name: AFC Chaman
- Founded: 1960; 66 years ago (as Afghan Agency Chaman)
- Stadium: Govt High School Ground; Jamal Nasir Stadium
- Capacity: 12,000
- Owner: Mohammad Ali
- Chairman: Haji Naseer Ali
- Manager: Sagheer Muhammad
- League: Pakistan Premier League
- 2018–19: Pakistan Premier League, 11th of 16

Afghan Football Club is a Pakistani professional football club based in Chaman, Balochistan, a border city of Pakistan near Afghanistan. The club last competed in the Pakistan Premier League.

== History ==
=== Early years ===
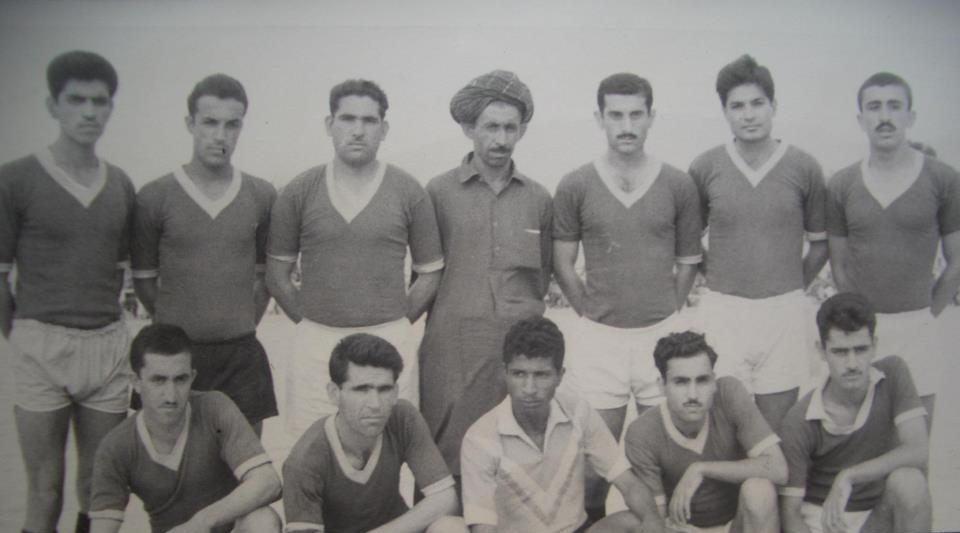
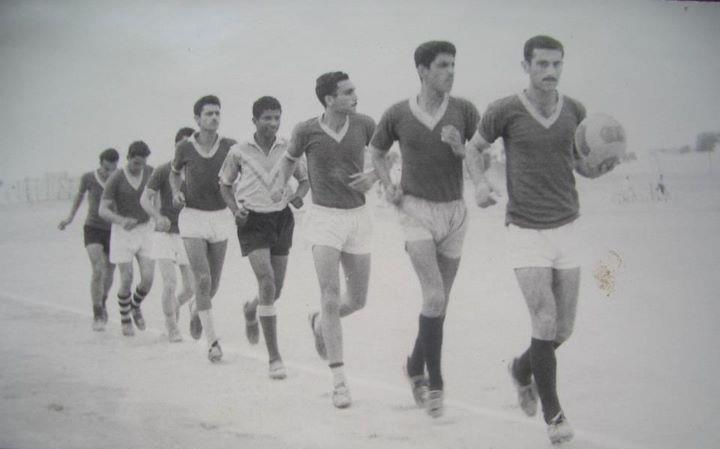
Afghan Chaman during a tournament in Quetta in 1967

The club was founded in 1960 as Afghan Agency Chaman. The Nazim of Chaman Abdul Qayyum Khadakoo was one of the founding members of the club.

On 27 June 1965 they won the "All Pakistan Tournament" in Sibi which became their first ever tournament victory in Pakistan.

In 1967 they competed in "All Pakistan General Musa Tournament" held at Quetta.

=== Top-flight cup debut (1998–2003) ===
Their first top-flight national competition came in 1998, the club made their top tier debut at the 1998 PFF President's Cup, where they failed to pass through the group G, which included National Bank and Sindh Government Press.

In the 1999 PFF President's Cup, they were placed in group F with WAPDA and Khan Research Laboratories, they lost both their matches 1–0, knocking them out of the tournament.

When they competed in the 2000 PFF President's Cup, they were to face Karachi Port Trust but withdrew from the tournament. In 2000, Afghan Chaman played in an invitation tour at Kandahar Stadium in neighbouring Afghanistan against a local team from Kandahar. During the third and final game of the tour, Taliban religious police burst into the ground and stopped the game in the middle. The Taliban arrested twelve of the Afghan Chaman's players and had their heads shaved as punishment for wearing shorts.

In the 2002 PFF President's Cup, they advanced from the group E, which included Karachi Port Trust and Pakistan Ordnance Factories, until losing in the round of 16 against KESC by 4–0.

=== Pakistan Premier League (2004–Present) ===
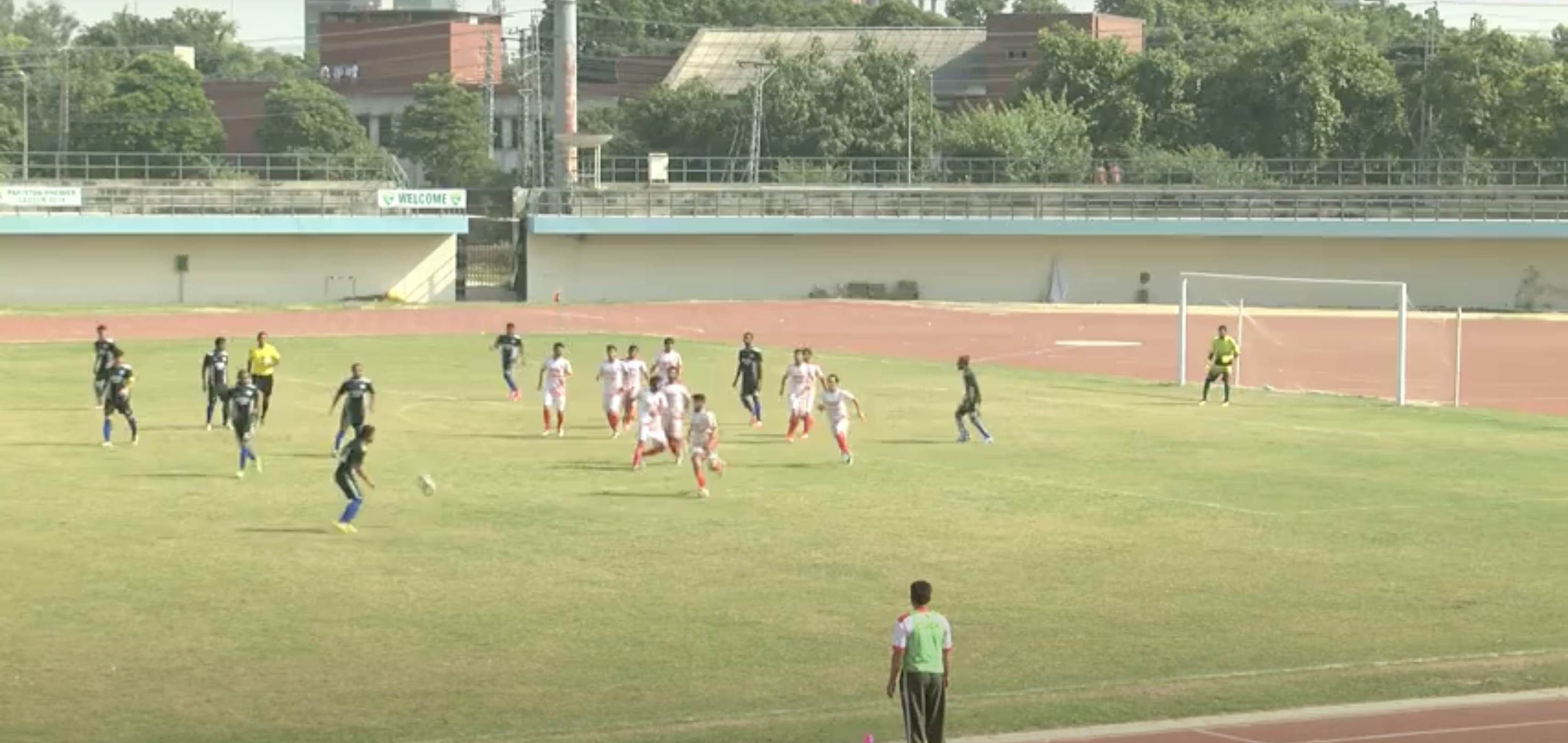
Afghan Chaman against the Ashraf Sugar Mills departmental team during the 2018–19 Pakistan Premier League

In 2004, Afghan FC Chaman became one of the founding members of the Pakistan Premier League. The team avoided relegation in the 2006–07 season, finishing in the ninth spot, 5 points above relegation zone.

The club regularly featured in the top tier, being few of the football clubs that gave competition to well-established departmental sides which dominated the Pakistan football domestic structure in the early years.

The team returned for the 2018–19 Pakistan Premier League season after years of Pakistan Football Federation turmoil and football inactivity, finishing 11th in the table.

In 2023, Afghan Chaman was shortlisted by the Pakistan Football Federation to compete in a three-team playoff, alongside Baloch Nushki and Muslim FC, for Pakistan's sole entry in the inaugural SAFF Club Championship expected to launch in 2024. Eventually, with no club meeting the financial and requirements in time, Pakistan forfeited its slot and the tournament also did not launch.

== Stadium ==
Like several Pakistan domestic football teams, Afghan Chaman have not own a dedicated ground. Hence the team used several municipal venues in Chaman for its home fixtures. The club usually have used Govt High School Ground and Jamal Nasir Stadium for its home fixtures for the Pakistan Premier League.

== Rivalries ==
=== Chaman Derby ===
Afghan Chaman shares rivalry with fellow hometown club Muslim FC, which have managed to command the highest crowds in Pakistani domestic football.

== Players (2023) ==
Note: Flags indicate national team as defined under FIFA eligibility rules; some limited exceptions apply. Players may hold more than one non-FIFA nationality.

No.	Pos.	Nation	Player
—	GK	PAK	Inayat Ullah
—	GK	PAK	Muhammad Hammad Afzal
—	DF	PAK	Khan Jr
—	DF	PAK	Muhammad Essa
—	DF	PAK	Zahoor Ahmed
—	DF	PAK	Sardar Wali
—	DF	PAK	Abdul Rasheed
—	DF	PAK	Ahmed Ullah
—	DF	PAK	Muhammad Salman
—	DF	PAK	Arslan Khan
—	DF	PAK	Nazeer Ahmed
—	DF	PAK	Salman
—	DF	PAK	Wajid Khan

No.	Pos.	Nation	Player
—	MF	PAK	Isteqlal
—	MF	PAK	Jadid Khan Pathan (captain)
—	MF	PAK	Aman Ullah Sr
—	MF	PAK	Hikmat Ullah
—	MF	PAK	Muhammad Arshad
—	MF	PAK	Umer Daraz
—	FW	PAK	Abdul Rahim
—	FW	PAK	Umair Younas
—	FW	PAK	Gul Muhammad
—	FW	PAK	Sohrab Khan
—	FW	PAK	Sadam Hussain
—	FW	PAK	Mujeeb Ur Rahman
—	FW	PAK	Majeed Khan
—	FW	PAK	Aman Ullah Jr

== Personnel (2023) ==
Position	Name
Head coach	(Pakistan) Sagheer Muhammad
Assistant coaches	(Pakistan) Adam Khan
Assistant coaches	(Pakistan) Zahid Rasheed
Team manager	(Pakistan) Niamat Ullah

== Competitive record ==
The club's competitive records since the 2004–05 season are listed below.

Season	Div	Tms	Pos	National Challenge Cup	AFC President's Cup	AFC Cup
2004–05	Pakistan Premier League	16	9	DNP	DNP	DNP
2005–06	Pakistan Premier League	12	4	Group stage	DNP	DNP
2006–07	Pakistan Premier League	12	9	DNP	DNP	DNP
2007–08	Pakistan Premier League	14	9	DNP	DNP	DNP
2008–09	Pakistan Premier League	14	10	DNP	DNP	DNP
2009–10	Pakistan Premier League	14	12	DNP	DNP	DNP
2010–11	Pakistan Premier League	22	8	DNP	DNP	DNP
2011–12	Pakistan Premier League	16	2	DNP	DNP	DNP
2012–13	Pakistan Premier League	16	9	DNP	DNP	DNP
2013–14	Pakistan Premier League	16	10	DNP	DNP	DNP
2014–15	Pakistan Premier League	12	10	DNP	DNP	DNP
2018–19	Pakistan Premier League	16	11	DNP	DNP	DNP

== Honours ==
=== Domestic ===
- Pakistan Premier League

- Runners-up (1): 2011–12

- Balochistan Cup

- Champions : 2019

== See also ==
- Akhtar Mohiuddin
