= Chaman =

City in Balochistan, Pakistan

Chaman چمن (Pashto)
- City
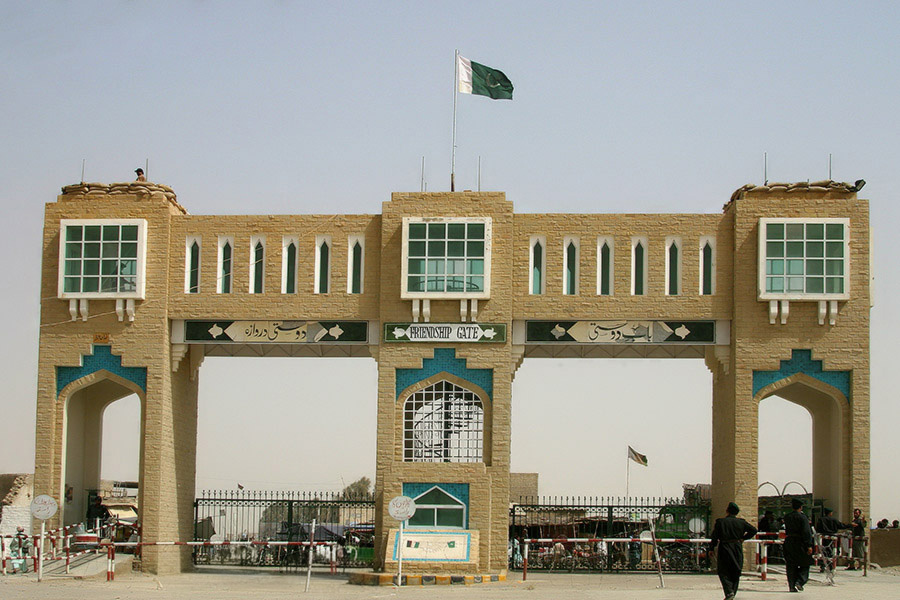
- Chaman Gate border between Pakistan and Afghanistan

- Location of Chaman Chaman (Pakistan) Chaman (South Asia) Chaman (Asia)
- Coordinates: 30°55′20″N 66°26′41″E
- Country: Pakistan
- Province: Balochistan
- District: Chaman District

Government
  - Type: Municipal Corporation
  - Mayor: Seat Vacant
- Elevation: 1,338 m (4,390 ft)

Population (2023 Census)
  - Total: 130,139
  - Rank: 93rd in Pakistan; 6th in Balochistan
- Time zone: UTC+5 (PST)
- Postal code: 86000
- Area code: 826
- Number of Union Councils: 13

Chaman (Pashto and Urdu: چمن) is the capital city of the Chaman District in Balochistan, Pakistan. It is located near the Afghanistan-Pakistan border. The city is situated south of the Wesh–Chaman border crossing with the neighbouring Kandahar province of Afghanistan.

== Etymology ==
The name Chaman is thought to be derived from garden in Urdu. There is little verifiable evidence to a singular and apparently unfounded claim that the name partly derived from that of a Hindu trader in the city before the partition, as the area was known as Chaman much before this period.

== History ==
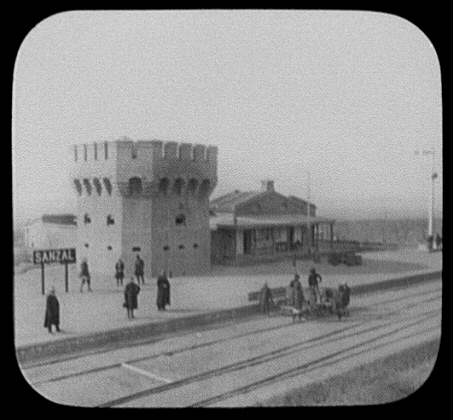
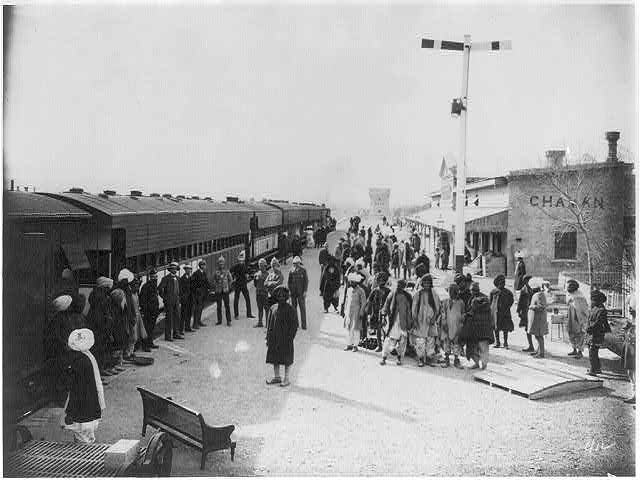
Train station at Chaman near Khojak Tunnel in 1895, by William Henry Jackson

Chaman has been used by NATO forces as a major supply route into Afghanistan since 2000.

Thousands of Afghan refugees enter Pakistan via the Chaman route on a regular basis.

Bombings occurred in 2017, 2020 Chaman bombing, and 2021.

In December 2022, the Afghan Taliban forces launched indiscriminate fire at the Chaman border, twice in a week and caused civilian casualties on the Pakistani side.

In October 2023, the border crossing process was made more stringent, requiring a passport and visa, whereas previously only requiring a national identification card, to cross from Pakistan to Afghanistan. This has resulted in protests in the city.

== Climate ==
With an influence from the local steppe climate, Chaman features a hot semi-arid climate (Köppen BSh). The average annual temperature in Chaman is 19.0 °C, while the annual precipitation averages 232 mm. June is the driest month with virtually no rain rainfall, while January is the wettest month, with an average 65 mm of precipitation.

July is the hottest month of the year with an average temperature of 31.0 °C. January is the coldest month with an average temperature of 6.4 °C.

Climate data for Chaman
| Month | Jan | Feb | Mar | Apr | May | Jun | Jul | Aug | Sep | Oct | Nov | Dec | Year |
|---|---|---|---|---|---|---|---|---|---|---|---|---|---|
| Mean daily maximum °C (°F) | 13.3 (55.9) | 16.0 (60.8) | 21.2 (70.2) | 27.3 (81.1) | 33.8 (92.8) | 38.7 (101.7) | 39.3 (102.7) | 38.5 (101.3) | 35.2 (95.4) | 29.2 (84.6) | 21.1 (70.0) | 16.8 (62.2) | 27.5 (81.6) |
| Daily mean °C (°F) | 6.4 (43.5) | 9.0 (48.2) | 13.8 (56.8) | 19.5 (67.1) | 24.7 (76.5) | 29.1 (84.4) | 31.0 (87.8) | 29.6 (85.3) | 24.9 (76.8) | 18.9 (66.0) | 12.8 (55.0) | 8.5 (47.3) | 19.0 (66.2) |
| Mean daily minimum °C (°F) | −0.4 (31.3) | 2.1 (35.8) | 6.5 (43.7) | 11.7 (53.1) | 15.6 (60.1) | 19.5 (67.1) | 22.7 (72.9) | 20.7 (69.3) | 14.7 (58.5) | 8.7 (47.7) | 3.6 (38.5) | 0.3 (32.5) | 10.5 (50.9) |
Source: Climate-Data.org

== Demographics ==
Population

Historical population

| Year | Pop. | ±% p.a. |
|---|---|---|
| 1951 | 6,980 | — |
| 1961 | 12,208 | +5.75% |
| 1972 | 20,702 | +4.92% |
| 1981 | 29,793 | +4.13% |

| Year | Pop. | ±% p.a. |
|---|---|---|
| 1998 | 56,792 | +3.87% |
| 2017 | 123,191 | +4.16% |
| 2023 | 130,139 | +0.92% |

According to 2023 census, Chaman had a population of 130,139. After the capital Quetta, Chaman is Balochistan's fifth-largest city according to the 2017 Pakistani census. The city is located in northern Balochistan.

Languages

Languages of Chaman (2023 Census)
1. Pashto (98.2%)
2. Punjabi (0.68%)
3. Urdu (0.34%)
4. Others (0.78%)

=== Religion ===
Religious groups in Chaman City (1941 & 2017) (Note: 1941: Data for the entirety of the town of Chaman, which included Chaman Municipality and Chaman Cantonment.)
| Religious group | 1941 | | 2017 | |
| Religious group | Pop. | % | Pop. | % |
|---|---|---|---|---|
| Hinduism | 2,898 | 43.58% | 379 | 0.31% |
| Islam | 2,812 | 42.29% | 122,263 | 99.23% |
| Sikhism | 697 | 10.48% | —N/a | —N/a |
| Christianity | 242 | 3.64% | 515 | 0.42% |
| Jainism | 1 | 0.02% | —N/a | —N/a |
| Ahmadiyya | —N/a | —N/a | 49 | 0.04% |
| Total population | 6,650 | 100% | 123,206 | 100% |

== Transport ==
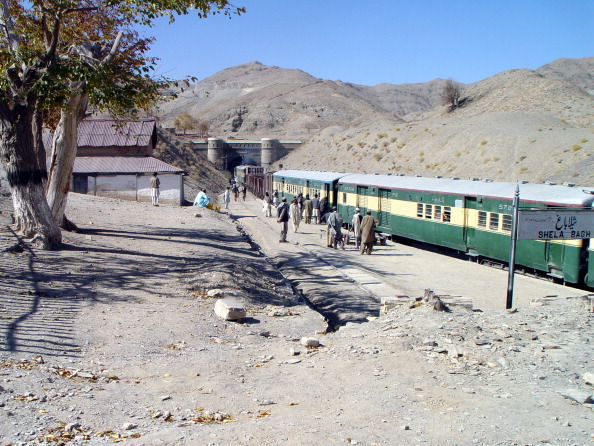
Passenger train entering the Khojak Tunnel

Located in Balochistan near the Pakistan–Afghanistan border, Chaman railway station is the final stop on Pakistan Railways' Rohri–Chaman Line. The station is serviced daily by the Chaman Passenger train, which runs a 142 km route between Quetta and Chaman.

While Chaman has been proposed as a gateway for cross-border rail connections to Kandahar and onward to Central Asia—supported by various bilateral and Trans-Afghan rail projects—no direct railway services currently operate into Afghanistan. Situated at a vital mountain pass, Chaman has historically served as an important trade stop on the eastern trade routes of the Silk Road.

== Trade ==
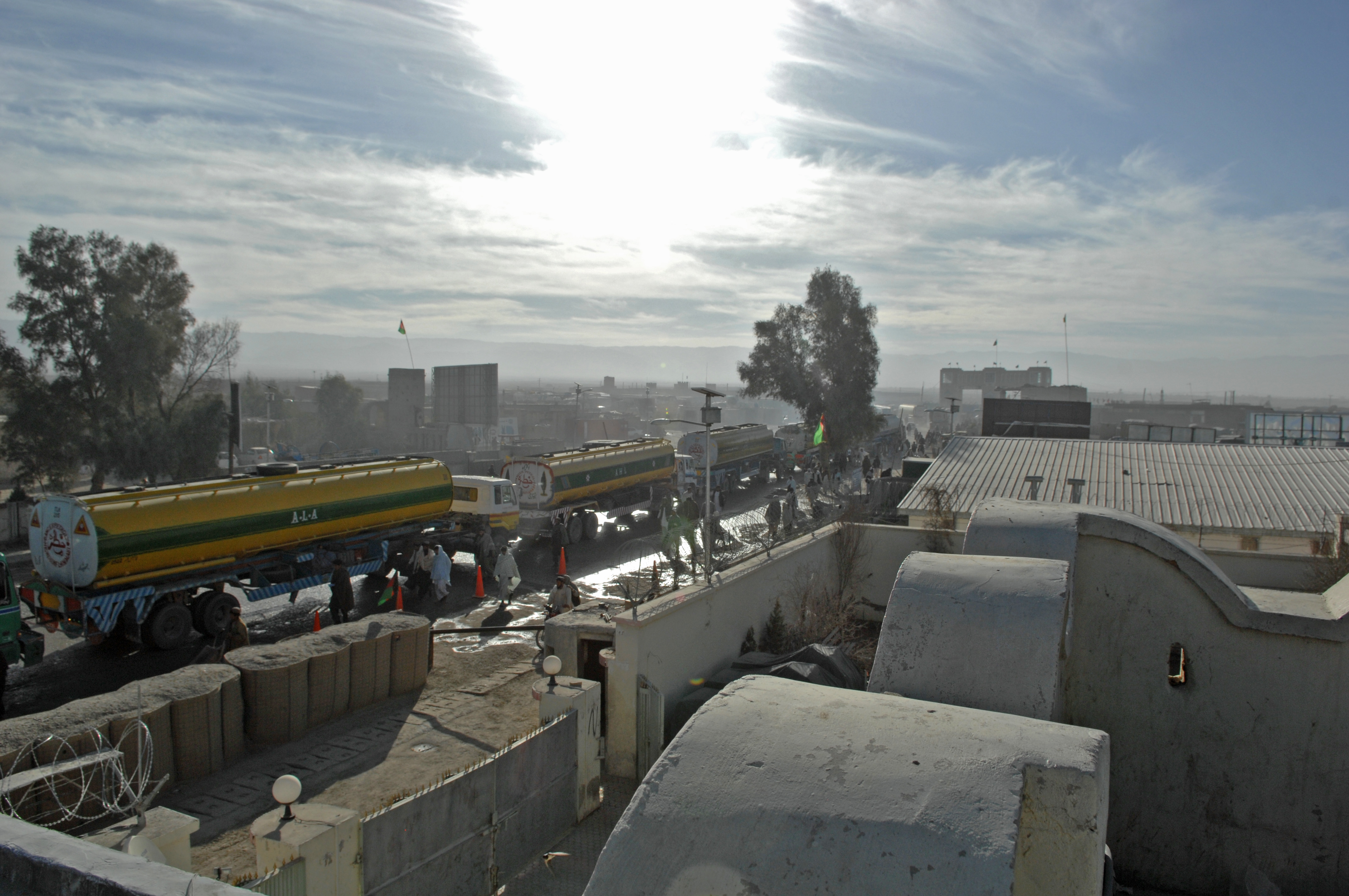
Empty fuel trucks crossing border between Afghanistan and Pakistan through Chaman

The town is an important trade point in the Balochistan region, providing a gateway on the trade routes between Afghanistan and Karachi. It underwent development during the martial law period of 1977 - 1985. People of the city import many things like cars, motor bikes and motor rickshaws. Besides, they import Japanese, Chinese and UAE phones, cosmetics, perfumes, and many other consumer goods from Afghanistan to Pakistan.

== Sports ==
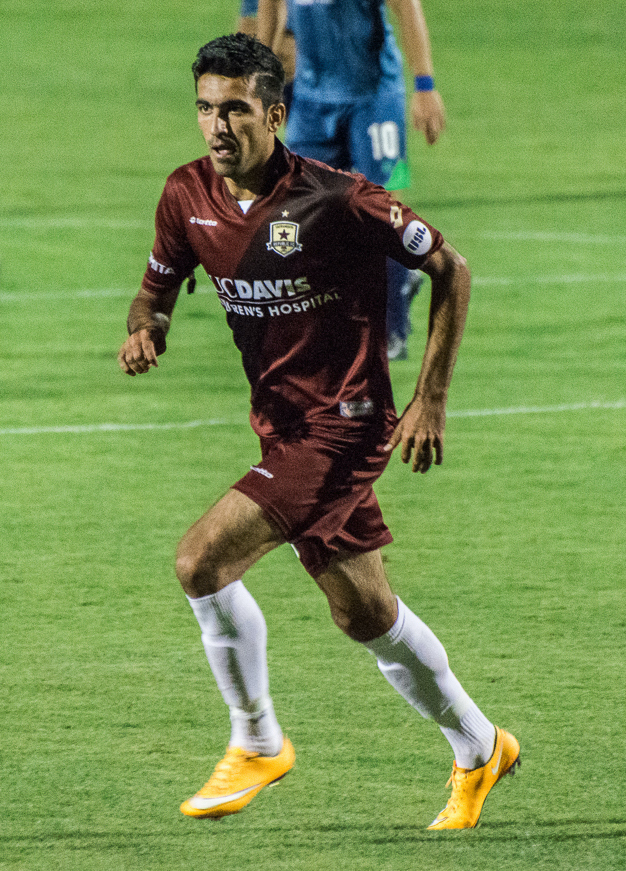
Kaleemullah is the first Pakistani footballer to play in the United States

Football is the most popular sport in the city, which have produced notable footballers for the Pakistan national football team including Muhammad Essa, Kaleemullah, Mehmood Khan, Jadid Khan Pathan, and Fareed Ullah.

The Chaman Derby between popular clubs Afghan Chaman and Muslim FC, share intense rivalry which have managed to command the highest crowds in Pakistani domestic football.

== Notable people ==
- Muhammad Essa, footballer
- Kaleemullah Khan, footballer
- Mehmood Khan, footballer
- Jadid Khan Pathan, footballer
- Fareed Ullah, footballer
- Asghar Khan Achakzai, President of the Awami National Party
- Mohammad Asghar (cricketer)
