= 2006 PFF League =

PFF League
- Season: 3rd
- Dates: 24 July – 2 August 2006
- Champions: Pakistan Television
- Promoted: Pakistan Television; Punjab Medical College

The 2006 PFF League was the 3rd season of PFF League, second tier of Pakistan Football Federation. The season started on 24 July 2006 concluded on 2 August 2006.

== Teams ==
=== Promotion and relegation ===
==== Teams relegated from PPL ====
Panther Club and Pakistan Public Work Department relegated from the 2005–06 Pakistan Premier League. However they didn't participated in the tournament.

==== Teams promoted from NCL ====
PMC Club Athletico, Baloch Nushki and Bannu Red promoted from the 2006 National Club Championship.

== Groups ==
=== Group 1 ===
Pos	Team	Pld	W	D	L	GF	GA	GD	Pts
1	Sui Southern Gas	3	2	1	0	4	2	+2	5
2	Punjab Medical College	3	1	2	0	4	2	+2	4
3	Mauripur Baloch	3	1	1	1	3	3	0	3
4	Baloch Nushki	3	0	0	3	2	6	-4	0

21 July 2006
16:15

Punjab Medical College	1–1	Sui Southern Gas Company
	Report

Faisalabad
22 July 2006
16:15

Mauripur Baloch	2–1	Baloch Nushki
	Report

Faisalabad
24 July 2006
16:15

Sui Southern Gas Company	1–0	Mauripur Baloch
	Report

Faisalabad
25 July 2006
16:15

Punjab Medical College	2–0	Baloch Nushki
	Report

Faisalabad
27 July 2006
16:15

Sui Southern Gas Company	2–1	Baloch Nushki
	Report

Faisalabad
28 July 2006
16:15

Punjab Medical College	1–1	Mauripur Baloch
	Report

Faisalabad

=== Group 2 ===
Pos	Team	Pld	W	D	L	GF	GA	GD	Pts
1	Pakistan Television	3	1	2	0	5	1	+4	4
2	Bannu Red	3	2	0	1	6	5	+1	4
3	Baloch Quetta	3	0	2	1	2	4	-2	2
4	Dera Eleven	3	0	2	1	2	5	-3	2

24 July 2006
16:15

Pakistan Television	1–1	Bannu Red
	Report

25 July 2006
16:15

Pakistan Television	1–1	Dera Eleven
	Report

27 July 2006
16:15

Dera Eleven	1–1	Baloch Quetta
	Report

28 July 2006
16:15

Bannu Red	3–1	Baloch Quetta
	Report

29 July 2006
16:15

Bannu Red	3–0	Dera Eleven
	Report

29 July 2006
16:15

Pakistan Television	0–0	Baloch Quetta
	Report

== Semi-final ==
30 July 2006
16:15

Pakistan Television	1–0	Sui Southern Gas Company
Akhtar Zaman (81')	Report

31 July 2006
16:15

Bannu Red	v	Punjab Medical College
	Report

== Third-Place ==
31 July 2006
16:15

Sui Southern Gas Company	2–1	Bannu Red
Aftab Ahmad (2'), Asim Faiz (80')	Report	Din Badshah (10')

== Final ==
28 July 2006
16:15

Pakistan Television	4–0	Punjab Medical College
Akhtar Zaman (13'); Naimat Ullah (35', 49', 83')	Report
