= PMC Club Athletico Faisalabad =

Pakistani football club

PMC Athletico Faisalabad
- Full name: Punjab Medical College Club Athletico Faisalabad
- Nicknames: Los Rojiblancos; CAF
- Short name: PMC
- Founded: 1990; 36 years ago (as Punjab Medical College Football Club)
- Ground: Punjab Medical College Ground
- Affiliation: Punjab Medical College
- Chairman: Saif ur Rehman Bhatti
Home colours	Away colours

PMC Club Athletico Faisalabad was a Pakistani football club based in Faisalabad, Punjab. Originally known as Punjab Medical College Football Club for its association with Punjab Medical College, the name was changed after the club had a 50% share takeover by Zenith Sports in July 2008 before the start of the 2008–09 Pakistan Premier League season.

== History ==
=== Early years ===
The club was founded in Faisalabad as an independent team. They teamed up with Punjab Medical College, making use of their home stadium and becoming Punjab Medical College Football Club or PMC F.C. for short. They were largely anonymous in Pakistan club football until they won promotion from the third tier 2006 National Club Championship, and subsequently from the second tier 2006 PFF National League to Pakistan Premier League in 2007.

=== Pakistan Premier League ===
In the 2007–08 Pakistan Premier League, the club only picked up one point in their first 10 games, a 2–0 home win against the equally struggling Wohaib FC gibing the team its first win in the PPL. The team still struggled until the second half of the season where they improved to the point that they closed in on the 13th placed Pakistan Railways. On the final fixture of the season, they needed to win against Pakistan Navy, having a game in hand over the Railway men. PMC FC beat Navy 2–1 at home, allowing them to stay in the PPL for another season. The club regularly featured in the top tier, being few of the football clubs that gave competition to well-established departmental sides which dominated the Pakistan football domestic structure in the early years.

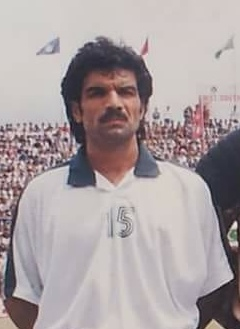
Pakistan international and club captain Haroon Yousaf was one of the founder members of the club

Between the end of the 2007–08 and the start of the 2008 season, a group called Zenith Sports with CEO Malik Riaz Hai Naveed took a 50% stake in the club. Zenith Sports had earlier planned to start a club in the Super Football League, but with the league cancelled they decided to invest in a PPL club instead. The club also signed Pakistan international players Haroon Yousaf and Sarfraz Rasool.

The club was renamed to PMC Club Athletico Faisalabad, a name heavily influenced by Spanish football. The new name and background changes failed to improve the club's fortunes. After a good start, Athletico faltered and quickly found themselves hovering around the relegation zone. Their fortune changed in the second half of the season, and they clawed way up the table, ending the season as 7th placed.

In their 2009–10 Pakistan Premier League, the club finished 13th in the table, but their relegation along with Baloch Nushki was revoked as the next season was extended to 16 teams. Haroon Yousaf became one of the founder members of PMC Club Athletico Faisalabad, remaining as captain of the team. In the 2010–11 Pakistan Premier League, captain Haroon Yousaf played a crucial role in surviving the relegation despite his age being more than 37 years old, after scoring last-minute penalty goal in a 2–1 victory against Baloch Nushki, allowing PMC Athletico the needful three points and to prevent the relegation. He also inspired the team from the brink of relegation by beating hosts Afghan FC Chaman by 1–0 in final game of the season.

In the 2012–13 season of the Pakistan Premier League, the club was relegated after finishing 14th in the table.

== Stadium ==
The Punjab Medical College Ground near the Punjab Medical College in Faisalabad served as the team home stadium.

== Competitive record ==
The club's competitive records since the 2006–07 season are listed below.

Season	Div	Tms	Pos	National Challenge Cup	AFC President's Cup	AFC Cup
2006–07	PFF League	8	2	DNP	DNP	DNP
2007–08	Pakistan Premier League	14	12	DNP	DNP	DNP
2008–09	Pakistan Premier League	14	7	DNP	DNP	DNP
2009–10	Pakistan Premier League	14	13	DNP	DNP	DNP
2010–11	Pakistan Premier League	16	14	DNP	DNP	DNP
2011–12	Pakistan Premier League	16	14	DNP	DNP	DNP
2012–13	Pakistan Premier League	16	14	DNP	DNP	DNP
2013–14	PFF League	24	Group stage	DNP	DNP	DNP
