= Nushki =

Nushki نوشکی
- City
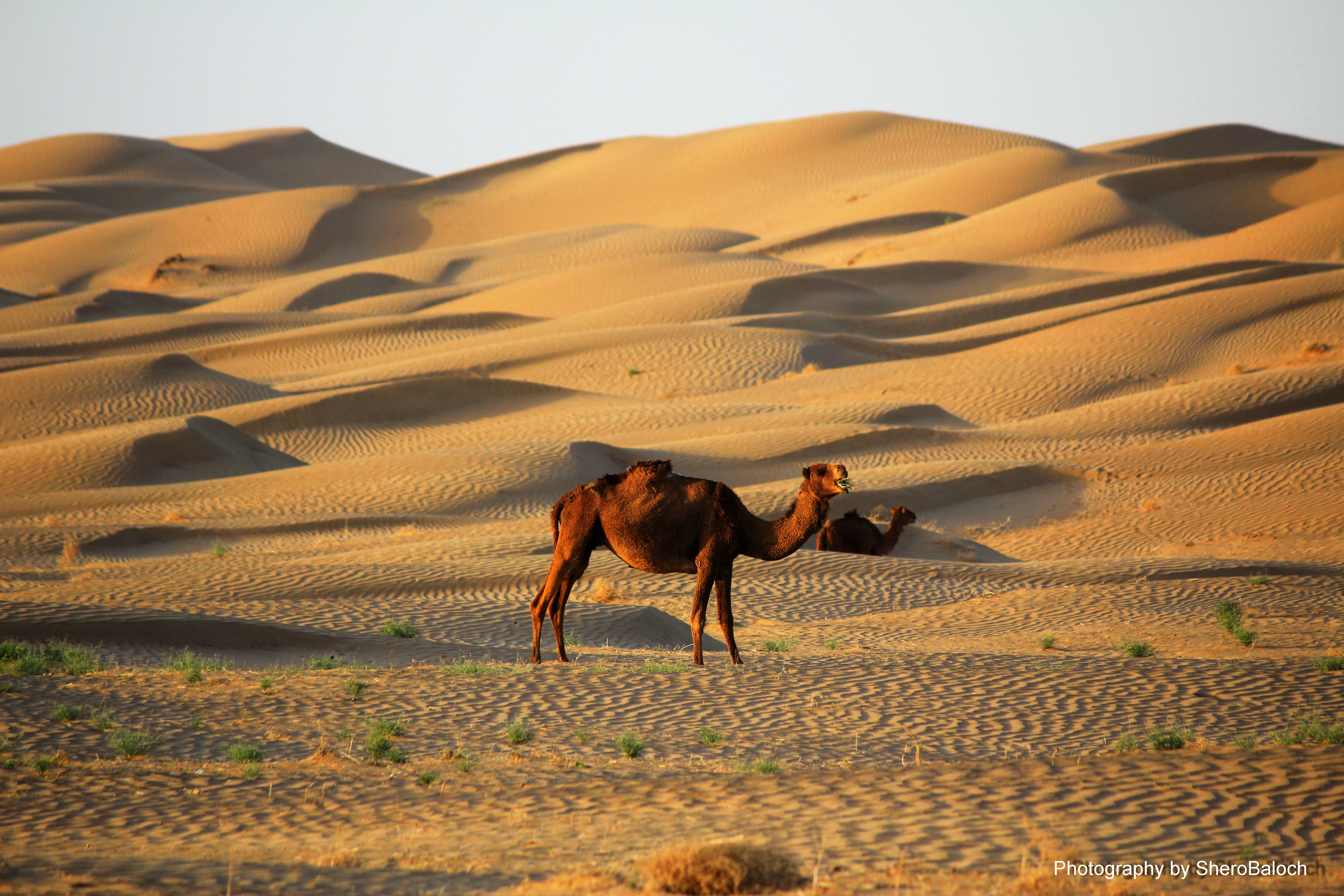
- A camel in the Nushki Desert
- Nickname: City of the golden deserts
- Location within Balochistan, Pakistan Location within Pakistan
- Coordinates: 29°33′20″N 66°1′18″E
- Country: Pakistan
- Province: Balochistan
- District: Nushki District

Population (2023 census)
  - Total: 48,572
- Website: balochistan.gov.pk

Nushki (Urdu: نوشکی) is a city in Nushki District of Balochistan, Pakistan. In 2023, the population was 48,572. It lies in the southwest of Quetta, the provincial capital, at an elevation of 2,900 feet (880 m) above sea level. From Nushki, the flat Balochistan desert stretches northward and westward to the Helmand River.

== History ==
Nushki was a starting point for the British exploration of Central Asia. The British, concerned that their colonies in India would be attacked overland by either Napoleon or the Russians, sent two British officers, Captain Charles Christie and Lieutenant Henry Pottinger, to explore the regions between Balochistan and Persia, which was then allied with the British. Christie and Pottinger traveled from the coast to Kelat (now Kalat) and separated at Nushki on March 22, 1810, with Christie going northwest to Herat and Pottinger traveling west across the deserts. It was unlikely that either of the two men would be accepted by the locals, and they concealed their identities by posing as horse traders or holy men during their respective journeys. They were reunited in Isfahan on June 30, 1810, with Christie having ridden 2,250 miles and Pottinger having ridden 2,412 miles.

During the Balochistan attacks in 2026, parts of Nushki were captured by the Balochistan Liberation Army (BLA) for three days before it was driven out.

== Demographics ==
=== Population ===
Historical population
Year	Pop.	±% p.a.
1951	2,142	—
1961	3,153	+3.94%
1972	5,329	+4.89%
1981	11,300	+8.71%
1998	23,948	+4.52%
2017	46,396	+3.54%
2023	48,572	+0.77%

According to the 2023 census, Nushki had a population of 48,572.

== Sports ==
Baloch FC Nushki has played in the top-flight Pakistan football league. They use the Nushki Stadium for home games.

== See also ==
- Districts of Pakistan
