= 1941–42 Santosh Trophy =

National Football Championship

Tournament details
- Country: India

Final positions
- Champions: Bengal (1st title)
- Runners-up: Delhi
- 60 minute matches

The 1941–42 Santosh Trophy was the first edition of the Santosh Trophy, the main state competition for football in India. It was held in July, 1941. Bengal won the title beating Delhi 5–1 in the final.

Ten teams entered the tournament but Dacca Sporting Association withdrew. Matches were played across the country and the final was played in Calcutta.

== The beginning ==
The Annual General Meeting of the Indian Football Federation was held in the Brabourne Stadium on January 27, 1941. D. Moir was re-elected as the President and so were E.J Turner as the Secretary and Pankaj Gupta as the Treasurer. Members of eleven football associations attended. The meeting decided to start an inter-provincial tournament on a zonal basis in 1941. The trophy, donated by the IFA was to be called the Santosh Memorial Cup.

The matches were to be of two halfs of thirty minutes with an interval of five minutes. If required, extra time of two seven minute halfs with a one minute interval were to be played. The players had to be registered with a member association under whose jurisdiction he had resided for at least six months. In a later meeting in April, the proposal of the Western India Football Association to name the trophy after Hinrichs was also considered.

== Preliminary matches ==
=== Zone A ===
- NWIFA qualified directly for the semifinals as they were the only team in the North Zone.

=== Zone B ===
5 July 1941

Delhi	0–0	Rajputana

Delhi

Delhi	5–1 replay	Rajputana

Delhi

=== Zone C ===
- Bengal received a walkover as Dacca withdrew drew to communal riots. The match was scheduled to be held in Dacca on 13 July.

17 July 1941

Bihar	1–0	United Provinces

Patna

Bengal	0–0	Bihar

Patna
21 July 1941

Bengal	4–0 replay	Bihar
Bachi Khan; Somana; D Banerjee

Patna
Referee: H. Cage

=== Zone D ===
6 July 1941

Mysore	3–0	Madras
Nanjunda; Karim; Habib	Report

SIAA Grounds, Madras
Referee: PN Ramachandran
13 July 1941

Bombay	4–1	Mysore
Langton; Hill; Bhimrao	Report	Nanjunda 13'

Cooperage Ground, Bombay
Referee: Swallow

The score was 1–1 at half-time.

== Semifinals ==
13 July 1941

Delhi	3–2	NWIFA
Bulland Akhtar ? Atma Ram	Report	Iftikhar Ahmed; Wahid

Delhi
Referee: Harnam Singh
24 July 1941

Bengal	1–0	Bombay
P De Mello 50'	Report

Calcutta
Referee: T Shome

== Final ==
There was a shower before the final and both teams started cautiously. The gates for the match was 6175 rupees and 4 annas (Rs. 6175.25). The Bengal-Bombay semifinal at the same venue collected 6492 rupees and 8 annas.

De Mello scored the first goal in the fourth minute directly from a corner kick, an "Olympic Goal". "The ball came in the trek of an archaic parabola and swerved into the net within the far post." Hameeduddin equalised in the ninth minute with a rising shot, from a pass by Atma Ram. In the 22nd minute, the Delhi goal keeper Daley missed by a center by Noor Mohammad. The ball was headed on by D. Banerjee for De Mello to score his second goal. Bengal led 2–1 at half time.

The third Bengal goal came in the eighth minute of the second half, Banerjee playing an angular shot from the right across Daley from a pass by Bhattacharjee. Bhattacharjee scored in the 16th and 23rd minutes, Sunil Ghosh providing both assists. Ghosh suffered a head injury at the start of the match but returned in the eleventh minute.

Bengal was presented the trophy by Mrs H.R. Norton, the wife of the President of Indian Football Association. The chief guests for the final were Mrs Norton and B. C. Ghosh, the vice president of the IFA.

26 July 1941

Bengal	5–1	Delhi
P De Mello 5', 22'; A Bhattacharjee 46', 53'; D Banerjee 38'	Report	Hameeduddin 9'

Calcutta
Referee: P. Misra

== Squads ==
- Bengal : Osman; Sirajuddin, and P. Chakraverti; A. Nandi, J. Lumsden and Masoom; Noor Mohamed, A. Bhattacharjee, D. Banerjee, S. Ghosh and P. De Mello
- Bombay : F. E.Edden (captain, Bombay Gymkhana); James (British Infantry) and S. Thompson (H.V.M.); Raja (B.E.S.T), Alexander (Y.M.C.A) and Telang (B.E.S.T); Bhimrao (Y.M.C.A), Rashad (Muslim Sports), Hill (British Infantry), Butchi (B.E.S.T) and Langton (British Infantry). Reserves : Drynan (GK, Heavy Battery), Higgins (Heavy Battery), Osbourne (Police), Karunakar (Caltex) and Swami (W.I.A.A)
- Mysore : Kadirvelu; Habeeb and Atkinson; Sheriff, Khader and Chinnaswamy; Nanjunda, Laxminarayan, Swaminathan, Murgesh and Rahmat
- Delhi : Daley; A.N. Kaul, Qamaruddin, Mohd Yousuf, Afzal Khan and Sardar Mirza; Habib Beg, Nawab, Akhtar, Atma Ram and Fayaz Khan. Also, Mohd Saeed Shah, Buland Akhtar, Hameeduddin, Safdar
- Rajputana : N Lodrick; H. Dean, A Rahim; Mobeen Ahmad, Sajjad Mohammad, Samiullah; Mumtaz Ahmed, Atta Mohammad, Debi Singh, Wahiduddin and Sikandar Khan
- N.W.I.F.A: Ismail, Gurdip Singh, Ramzan, Faiz, Siraj-ud-Din, Karim Nawaz, Munir, Iftikhar, Zahur, Wahid, Hassan, Fakhru, Abdur Rahman, Akhtar

== Notes ==
Some of the teams were referred to after their football associations. This article uses the names by which the teams came to be known.

- IFA Bengal (Indian Football Association) - Bengal
- WIFA Bombay (Western India Football Association) - Bombay
- NWIFA (North West India Football Association) - Punjab and Balochistan
- Delhi FA - Delhi
