= Bachi Khan =

Pakistani footballer

- Khan with Kolkata Mohammedan in 1937

Personal information
- Full name: Ghulam Nabi
- Date of birth: Unknown
- Place of birth: Peshawar, North-West Frontier Province, British India
- Date of death: Unknown
- Position: Defender

Senior career*
| Years | Team | Apps | (Gls) |
| 1930s | Afghan Club Kohat | | |
| 1930s | Usmania | | |
| 1935–1944 | Mohammedan SC | | |
| 1945 | Bhawanipore | | |
| 1946 | Mohammedan SC | | |
- * Club domestic league appearances and goals

Ghulam Nabi, commonly known as Bachi Khan, was a Pakistani footballer who played as defender for Kolkata Mohammedan in British India during the 1930s and 1940s. He was a key contributor to the club's success in its Golden Era, helping the team secure several titles during his tenure.

== Early life ==
Khan hailed from the North-West Frontier Province, British India.

== Playing career ==
Khan first played for local Afghan Club Kohat, and then played for local Usmania. He then joined Mohammedan SC in 1935. Where he was a prominent role alongside teammate Jumma Khan in the team's backline throughout the 1930s and 1940s. Contributing to several assists during his tenure at the club, helping them win the Calcutta Football League on several occasions, alongside contributing to domestic competitions such as the 1940 Durand Cup final. He also featured at the IFA Shield. Khan would then leave in 1944, to join Bhawanipore Club. However, returned to Mohammedan Sporting a year later.

Khan was also selected to play for the N.W.I.F.A team in 1937, as well as the All-India XI, to play against Islington Corinthians.

Khan also represented the Bengal football team at the Santosh Trophy in the 1940s.

== Playing style ==
Bachi Khan was known for his tough tackling and physical style of play. Regularly troubling opposing full-backs with his rough tackles, making him a constant threat on the pitch. Beyond his defensive work, he also contributed to attacking build-up by winning back possession and helping create several scoring opportunities for the attacking line.

== Honours ==
=== Mohammedan Sporting ===
- Calcutta Football League:
  - Winners (6): 1935, 1936, 1937, 1938, 1940, 1941
- Durand Cup:
  - Winners (1): 1940
- IFA Shield:
  - Winners (3): 1936, 1941, 1942
