= Rashid Khan (footballer) =

Pakistani footballer

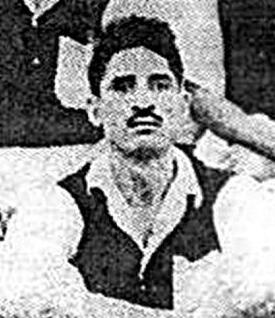
- Khan with Kolkata Mohammedan in 1940

Personal information
- Full name: Abdur Rashid Khan
- Date of birth: 1907
- Place of birth: Kohat, North-West Frontier Province, British India
- Date of death: 7 January 1967 (aged 59–60)
- Place of death: Kohat, Pakistan
- Position: Half-back

Senior career*
Years	Team	Apps	(Gls)
1930s	Shining Club Kohat		
1932–1947	Mohammedan SC		(15+)
- * Club domestic league appearances and goals

Rashid Khan, popularly known as Shidoo, was a Pakistani footballer who played for Mohammedan SC as a Half-back. Rashid was also a part of the historic 1940 squad which won the 1940 Durand Cup.

== Early life ==
Rashid was born in the Kohat region of North-West Frontier Province, British India.

== Playing career ==
Rashid played for Shining Club of Kohat in the 1930s. He joined Calcutta side Mohammedan SC in 1932. Where he would become an influential midfielder, contributing to helping them win the Calcutta Football League multiple times, as well as helping the team secure domestic competitions such as the IFA Shield, and the historic 1940 Durand Cup final. Rashid also toured Ceylon and Burma with the team during his time at the club.

In 1935, Rashid helped the team win the Kolkata Football League, notably, scoring 16 goals throughout the campaign.

In 1941, Rashid would help his team to win the 1941 IFA Shield final, scoring in the final alongside teammate Saboo. He also played in the Rovers Cup. In 1941, he also featured at the Montmorency Football Tournament in Lahore.

He also represented the North-West Frontier Province team against the I.F.A.

== Playing style ==
Rashid was praised for his ability to use both feet with equal dexterity, and his ability to break attacks.

== Death ==
Rashid passed away on 7 January 1967, from a prolonged illness in Kohat, Pakistan, at the age of 60.

== Honours ==
=== Mohammedan Sporting ===
- Calcutta Football League:
  - Winners (7): 1934, 1935, 1936, 1937, 1938, 1940, 1941
- Durand Cup:
  - Winners (1): 1940
- IFA Shield:
  - Winners (3): 1936, 1941, 1942
