= Abdur Rahman (footballer) =

Bangladeshi footballer

Personal information
- Full name: Abdur Rahman
- Date of birth: 1919
- Place of birth: Howrah district, British India
- Date of death: September 1971 (aged 51–52)
- Place of death: Khulna, Bangladesh
- Position: Left winger

Senior career*
Years	Team	Apps	(Gls)
1936–1941	Mohammedan		
1942–19??	Eastern Railway		
- * Club domestic league appearances and goals

Abdur Rahman (Bengali: আবদুর রহমান; 1919 – September 1971) was a former association footballer, who played as a winger for Mohammedan Sporting in the 1930s and 1940s.

== Early life ==
Abdur Rahman was born in 1919, in the Howrah district of then British India. He completed his education in 1935.

== Playing career ==
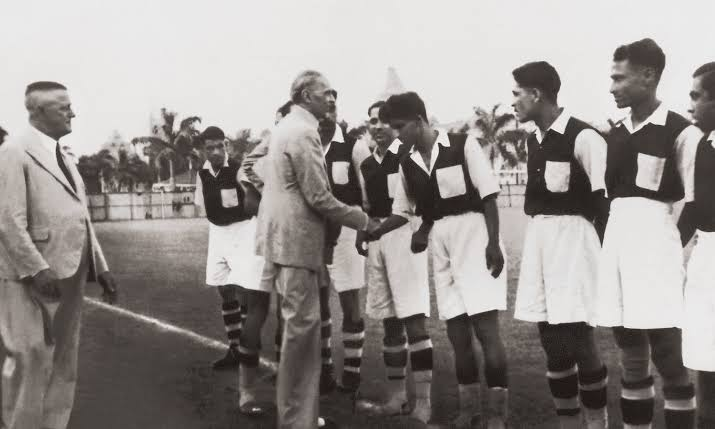
Muhammad Ali Jinnah shaking hands with Abdur Rahman before a match.

In 1936, Rahman joined Calcutta Football League side Mohammedan Sporting. Although Rahman would initially be a backup player for the already occupied left wing position. He would soon develop into top form, being crucial for Mohammedan Sporting.

In 1940, Rahman would be a part of the historic team that secured the Durand Cup final, Rovers Cup, becoming the first Indian team to achieve a "double". The following year, Rahman helped the team win the 1941 IFA Shield.

In 1942, Rahman would join East Bengal Railways, he would be a part of the team for mostly the remainder of his career.

== Personal life ==
After the Partition of India in 1947. Rahman would migrate to Khulna, Pakistan. Rahman passed away in 1971, leaving behind a wife, five daughters and one son.

== Honours ==
Mohammedan Sporting

- Calcutta Football League: 1936, 1937, 1938, 1940, 1941
- Durand Cup: 1940
- IFA Shield: 1936, 1941
- Rovers Cup: 1940
- Demontmercy Cup: 1939
