= Masoom (footballer) =

British Indian footballer

- Masoom during his playing days

Personal information
- Full name: Syed Masoom Ali
- Date of birth: Unknown
- Place of birth: Bangalore, British India
- Date of death: Unknown
- Position: Midfielder

Senior career*
Years	Team	Apps	(Gls)
1930s	Bangalore Muslims		
1934–1946	Mohammedan Sporting		

International career
1936	India		
- * Club domestic league appearances and goals

Syed Masoom Ali, alternatively spelled as Masum, was a former association footballer, who played for Mohammedan Sporting in the 1940s, Masoom was known for his leadership and passing abilities.

== Club career ==
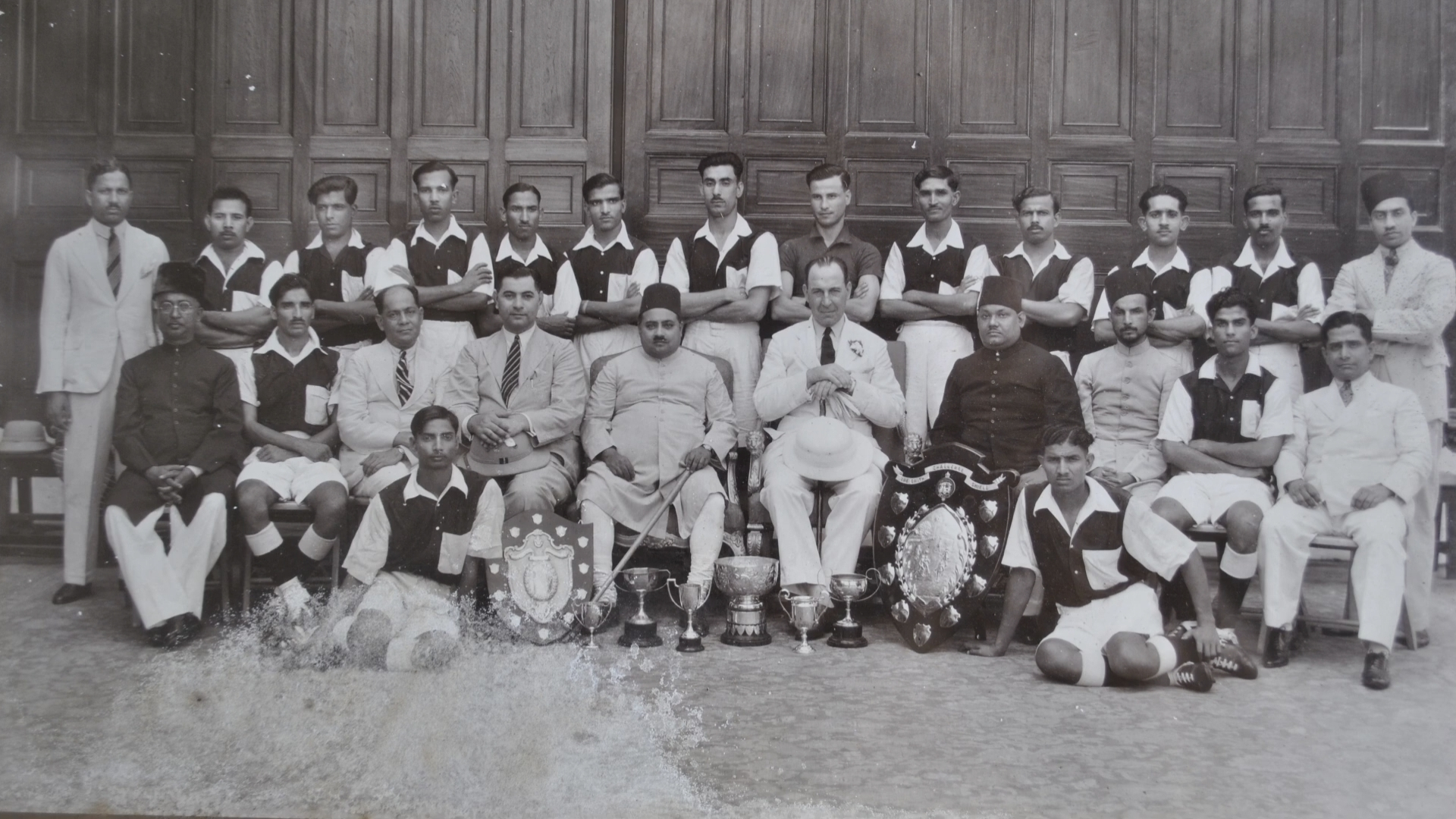
Masoom (standing sixth from left, standing row) with Mohammedan Sporting in 1935.

Masoom was an integral part of the Bangalore Muslims, before being recruited by Mohammedan Sporting. At the club, Masoom played an influential role in the team's structure.

Notably, Masoom was the captain of the team in the 1940 Durand Cup final. He would go on to appear for the club up until partition.

== International career ==
Masoom represented the India national team in the 1936. Where he played against China in a friendly which resulted in a 1–1 draw.

== Honours ==
=== Mohammedan Sporting ===
- Calcutta Football League:
  - Winners (7): 1934, 1935, 1936, 1937, 1938, 1940, 1941
- Durand Cup:
  - Winners (1): 1940
- IFA Shield:
  - Winners (3): 1936, 1941, 1942
