= 1940 Durand Cup final =

- Event: 1940 Durand Cup
Mohammedan Sporting	Royal Warwickshire Regiment
2	1
- Date: 7 December 1940
- Venue: Irwin Amphitheatre, New Delhi, India
- Referee: Harnam Singh

The 1940 Durand Cup final was the concluding match of the 1940 Durand Cup, the 53rd edition of the Durand Cup, the final took place in 1940 between Mohammedan Sporting Club and Royal Warwickshire Regiment, and was played at Irwin Amphitheatre, New Delhi, then part of British India. Mohammedan Sporting Club won the match by 2–1 securing their first Durand Cup title and becoming the first ever Indian team to achieve this accomplishment.

== Route to the final ==
Mohammedan Sporting		Round	Royal Warwickshire Regiment	
Opponent	Result	Round	Opponent	Result
Union Club	2–0	Quarter–Final	Unknown	N/A
Welch Regiment	3–1	Semi–Final	Unknown	N/A

== Match ==
=== Summary ===
On 7 December 1940, the final of the 53rd edition of the Durand Cup, the final took place between Mohammedan Sporting Club and the Royal Warwickshire Regiment. The Mohammedan's beat several difficult clubs and organisations such as the Welch Regiment in the semi-finals, earning their ticket to the final. While the Royal Warwickshire Regiment, being one of the best teams in the tournament, paved their way through and reached the final.

The final began with Mohammedan Sporting dominating much of the opening half and eventually taking the lead in the 24th minute when Noor Mohammed Jr. scored after Saboo who broke clear and passed to Karim, whose effort was initially partially cleared. Warwickshire Regiment equalised early into the second half in the third minute, through their centre-forward, Warman, following a corner kick and a defensive lapse. Mohammedan regained the lead soon afterwards when Saboo scored the winning goal from close range after a break involving Karim and Noor Mohammed Jr., despite sustained pressure from the opposition in the closing stages, Mohammedan Sporting held on to secure the title, becoming the first Indian club to win the trophy.

=== Details ===
12 December 1940

Mohammedan Sporting	2–1	Royal Warwickshire Regiment
Noor Mohammad Jr. 24'; Saboo (?)		Warman 48'

Irwin Amphitheatre, New Delhi
Attendance: 1,00,000 (est.)
Referee: Harnam Singh

Mohammedan Sporting

GK	(British Raj) Ali Hossain
FB	(British Raj) Bachi Khan
FB	(British Raj) Jumma Khan
HB	(British Raj) Bashir
HB	(British Raj) Rashid Khan
HB	(British Raj) Masoom (c)
FW	(British Raj) Noor Mohammad Jr.
FW	(British Raj) Karim
FW	(British Raj) Hafiz Rashid
FW	(British Raj) Saboo
FW	(British Raj) Abdur Rahman

GK	(United Kingdom) Cloves
FB	(United Kingdom) Lewis
FB	(United Kingdom) Clay
HB	(United Kingdom) Wharton
HB	(United Kingdom) Stanley
HB	(United Kingdom) Sparks
FW	(United Kingdom) Jones
FW	(United Kingdom) Williams
FW	(United Kingdom) Warman
FW	(United Kingdom) Harris
FW	(United Kingdom) Jones
