= Kalu Khan (footballer) =

British Indian footballer (1911 – 1970)

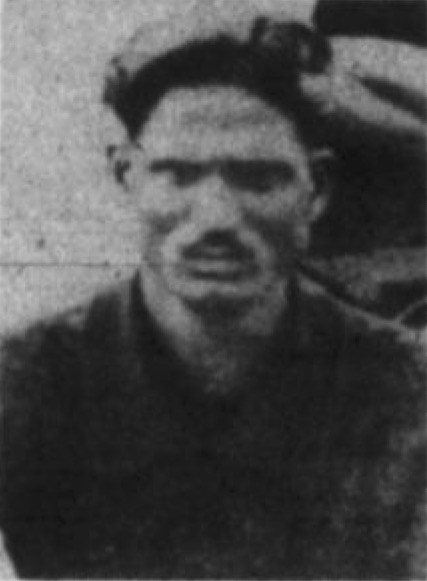

Personal information
- Full name: Kalu Khan
- Date of birth: 1911
- Place of birth: Nasirabad, Ajmer, British India
- Date of death: 30 July 1970 (aged 58–59)
- Place of death: Hyderabad, Sindh, Pakistan
- Position: Goalkeeper

Senior career*
Years	Team	Apps	(Gls)
1920s–1930s	Delhi Youngmen		
1933–1947	Mohammedan SC		
- * Club domestic league appearances and goals

Kalu Khan (1911 – 30 July 1970), alternatively spelled as Kaloo Khan, was a football player most remembered for being the long-time custodian of Calcutta's Mohammedan Sporting Club. He was a key player during Mohammedan Sporting Club's heyday in the 1930s.

== Early life ==
Kalu Khan was born in 1911 in Nasirabad, Ajmer, British India. He learned football while growing up among soldiers.

== Club career ==
Khan would first represent various British Army teams stationed in the Delhi Cantonment, playing for the Friends Union and participating in several military and regional tournaments throughout British India, including the Maharaja Dattaya Shield held in Rajasthan. He also played for the Youngmen Club of Delhi in the 1920s.

Kalu Khan (sitting left, bottom row) with Mohammedan Sporting in 1934.

In 1933, he toured Calcutta with the football team of the B.B & C.I. Railway, playing exhibition matches against Mohammedan Sporting and Mohun Bagan. After his performance in the tour, Khan was recruited by Mohammedan Sporting Club, alongside fellow players Hafiz Rashid, and Mohammad Yasin. The team subsequently earned the promotion to the First Division of the Calcutta Football League. Khan quickly became a key player in Mohammedan Sporting's remarkable ascent, assisting the team in winning the Calcutta Football League in 1934 and becoming a member of the first Indian side to win the First Division championship. From 1934 until 1938, the team won five league titles in a row.

He also participated in the IFA Shield, when he was seriously hurt while playing the East Yorkshire Regiment at the Eden Gardens. He shattered his right shinbone after colliding with an opponent while successfully stopping a goalbound shot, forcing him to temporarily retire from first-class football. In 1941, Khan made a return, assisting Mohammedan Sporting in winning the IFA Shield and the Calcutta Football League, earning the team's second historic "double."

He would go on to play for the club till the mid-1940s and last appeared for Mohammedan Sporting Club in the 1947 IFA Shield during the turbulent period surrounding the Partition of India. In a match against Bhawanipore Club, he suffered another shin injury while making a crucial save, which led to his final retirement from competitive football.

== Personal life and death ==
After the Partition of India, Khan settled in Hyderabad, Sindh, Pakistan, where he lived until his eventual death on 30 July 1970. He was survived by his wife, three sons, and two daughters.

== Honours ==
Mohammedan Sporting

- Calcutta Football League:
  - Winners (7): 1934, 1935, 1936, 1937, 1938, 1940, 1941
- Durand Cup:
  - Winners (1): 1940
- IFA Shield:
  - Winners (3): 1936, 1941, 1942
