= Hafiz Rashid =

British Indian footballer

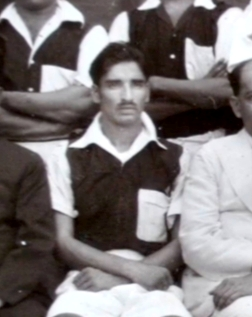
- Rashid with Kolkata Mohammedan in 1935

Personal information
- Full name: Hafiz Ahmed Rashid
- Date of birth: Unknown
- Place of birth: Nasirabad, Ajmer, British India
- Date of death: Unknown
- Place of death: Karachi, Pakistan
- Position: Striker

Senior career*
Years	Team	Apps	(Gls)
1920s–1932	Delhi Youngmen		
1933–1947	Kolkata Mohammedan		(100+)
1942	→ Bata SC Calcutta		
1954	Ispahani Club		

International career
1933	India XI	1	(0)

Managerial career
- 1951: EP Gymkhana
- 1956: Dhaka Mohammedan
- 1962: Pakistan Youth
- * Club domestic league appearances and goals

Hafiz Rashid, commonly known as Rashid Sr., was a footballer who played as a striker, and manager. He is regarded as one of the most prominent players of Kolkata Mohammedan during the 1930s and 1940s. After the partition of India in 1947, Rashid settled in Pakistan where he was awarded Pride of Performance in 1962. He also served as head coach of the Pakistan national youth team the same year.

== Early life ==
Rashid hailed from Nasirabad, Ajmer in Rajasthan.

== Club career ==
Hafiz (second from right, middle row) with Mohammedan Sporting in 1934.

Rashid began his career with Youngmen Club of Delhi. In 1933, Rashid played with the football team of B.B & C.I. Railway as a left winger during a visit to Calcutta for two exhibition matches, against Kolkata Mohammedan on 4 April, and Mohun Bagan on 8 April. Subsequently, Rashid along with fellow Nasirabad based goalkeeper Kalu Khan, and Rawalpindi based forward Mohammad Yasin were scouted and recruited by Kolkata Mohammedan. Rashid switched his position as centre forward and then a crucial role for the promotion of Kolkata Mohammedan from the second division to first division in 1933, scoring 53 goals.

Rashid would also finish as the top goal-scorer of the Calcutta Football League for three consecutive seasons between 1934 and 1936. He scored nine goals during the 1934 campaign, followed by 15 goals in 1935, and 13 goals in 1936.

On 17 June 1936, during a match against the English Military Attached section team at the Mohun Bagan Ground, he fractured his right leg, however, he would return the next season, and continued playing for the club until 1947. In 1940, he helped the team win the historic 1940 Durand Cup final over Royal Warwickshire Regiment, contributing to Kolkata Mohammedan becoming the first ever Indian club to win the final of the Durand Cup. He also featured at the IFA Shield.

In 1942, Rashid, along with a few fellow teammates of Mohammedan Sporting were loaned to Bata SC for their participation in the Rovers Cup that year. Players like Noor Mohammed Jr., Taher, Sirajuddin, Saboo joined the team, that year, the team managed to reach the final of the tournament. Winning the final match 3–1 against Bombay Champions, W.I.A.A. Staff.

After the partition of India, he represented Ispahani Club at the Dhaka First Division Football League in 1954.

== International career ==
In 1933, Rashid was selected to represent the India XI against European XI, which resulted in his side winning the event 2–0. He also took part in the next two editions, in which his side lost 0–4, before winning the next occasion with Rashid scoring.

== Coaching career ==
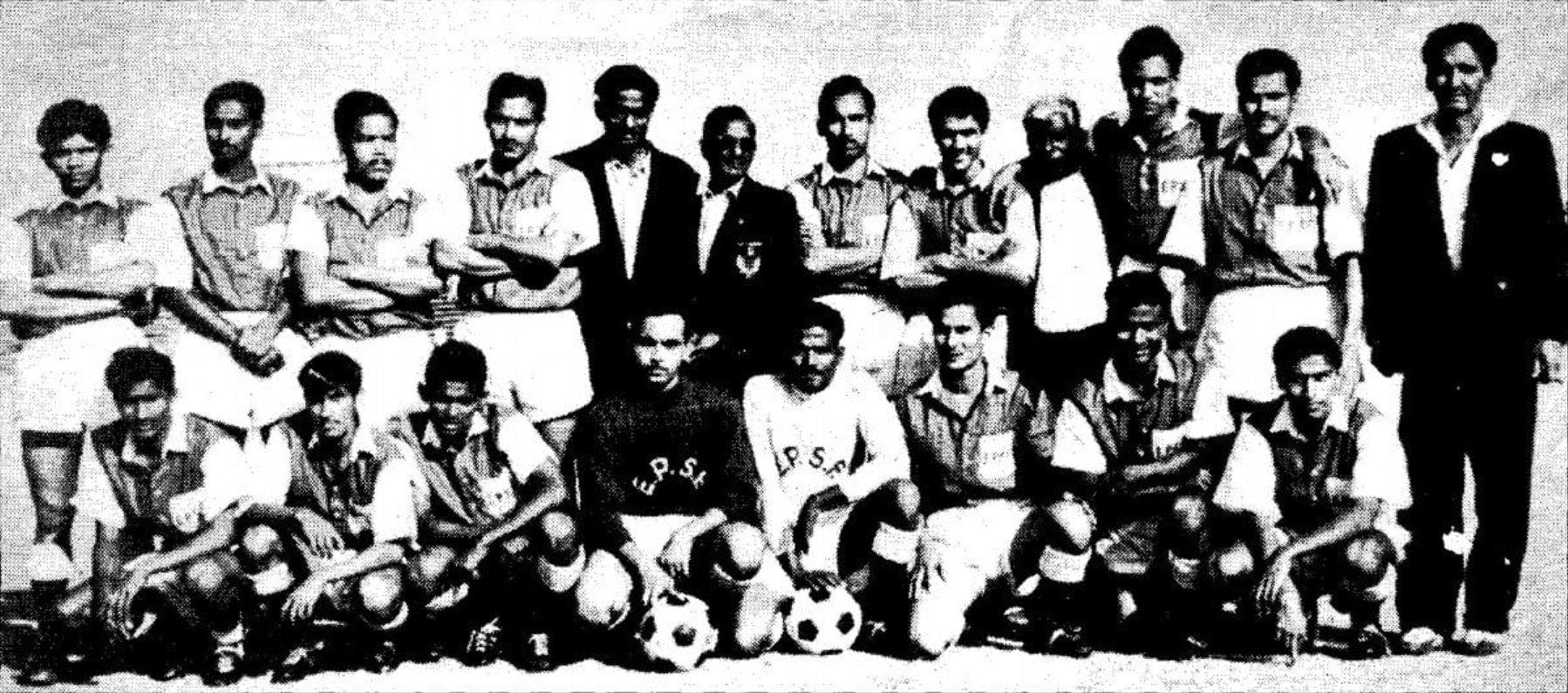
Rashid (extreme right, standing row) with the East Pakistan football team before an exhibition match against the China national team.

In 1951, Rashid was appointed coach of East Pakistan Gymkhana of Dhaka. He also had a coaching stint at Dhaka Mohammedan alongside Mohammad Shahjahan and Abbaz Mirza in the mid-1950s, helping the club win its inaugural First Division league title in 1957.

In 1962, Rashid served as head coach of the Pakistan national youth team for the 1962 AFC Youth Championship. He was also a member of the Pakistan Sports Control Board as chief coach.

Later in 1968, he supervised the Dacca University football team alongside Mohammed Rahmatullah, for their participation in the Independence Day Football Tournament.

== Personal life and death ==
After the partition of India in 1947, Rashid settled in Dhaka, East Pakistan. He was awarded Pride of Performance in 1962. He later spent the last years of his life in Karachi.

== Honours ==
Mohammedan Sporting

- Calcutta Football League:
  - Winners (7): 1934, 1935, 1936, 1937, 1938, 1940, 1941
- Durand Cup:
  - Winners (1): 1940
- IFA Shield:
  - Winners (3): 1936, 1941, 1942

Bata SC

- Rovers Cup:
  - Winners (1): 1942

Individual

- Calcutta Second Division Football League:
  - Top goal-scorer (1): 1933 (53 goals)
- Presidential Pride of Performance:
  - Awarded (1): 1962 (by the Government of Pakistan)
- National Sports Awards:
  - Awarded (1): 1976 (by the Government of Bangladesh)
