= Sirajuddin (footballer) =

Bangladeshi footballer

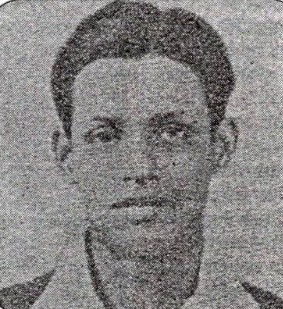

Personal information
- Full name: S. Sirajuddin
- Date of birth: 1908
- Place of birth: Comilla, Bengal, British India (present-day Bangladesh)
- Date of death: Unknown
- Place of death: Unknown
- Position: Full-back

Senior career*
Years	Team	Apps	(Gls)
1930–1935	Kolkata Mohammedan		
1936	Kalighat		
1937–1942	Kolkata Mohammedan		
1942	→ Bata SC Calcutta (loan)		

International career
1941	India XI		
- * Club domestic league appearances and goals

S. Sirajuddin (Bengali: এস সিরাজুদ্দীন; 1908 – Unknown), alternatively spelled Serajuddin, was a footballer from East Bengal present-day Bangladesh. He is best known for representing Kolkata Mohammedan as a full-back prior to the partition of India.

== Early life ==
Sirajuddin was born in Comilla, Bengal, British India in 1908.

== Club career ==
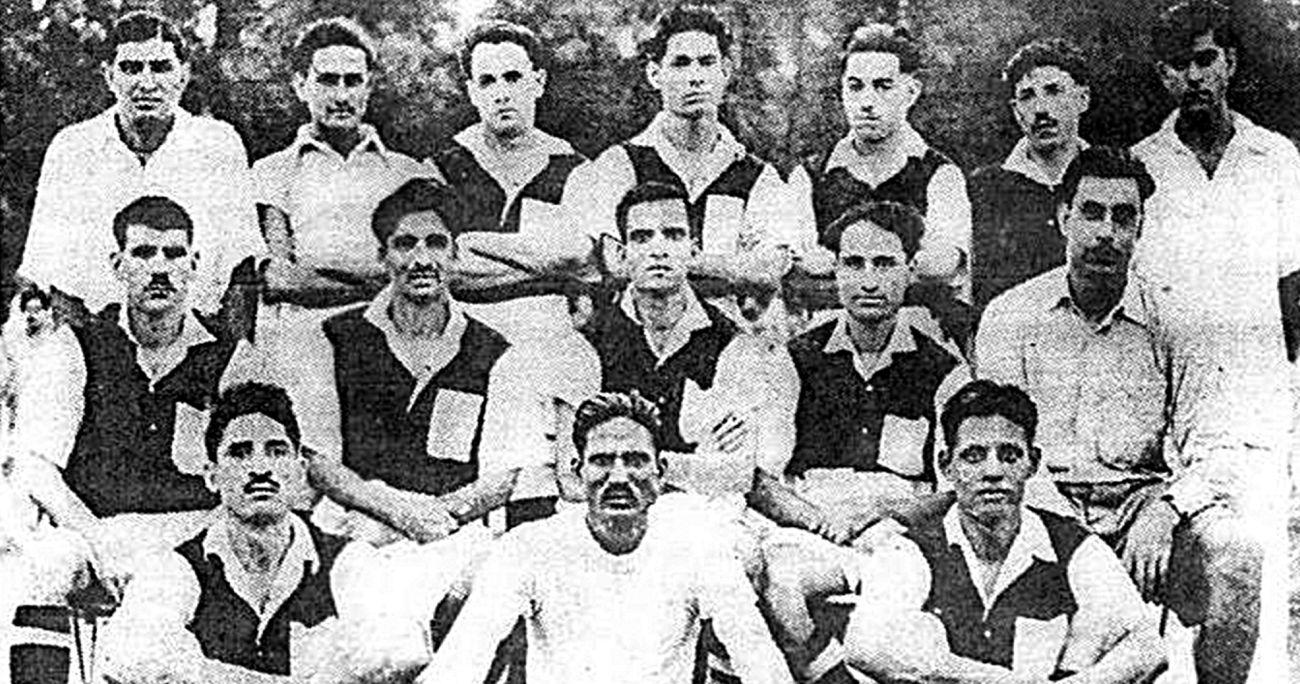
Sirajuddin (bottom row, first from right) with the 1940 CFL winners, Mohammedan.

A Mohun Bagan reject, Sirajuddin, was recruited by Kolkata Mohammedan official CA Aziz in 1930. He played as a full-back under the captaincy of Habibullah Bahar Chowdhury for the club during their Calcutta League Second Division triumph in 1933. The following year, he was part of the team which became the first native club to win the First Division title. Sirajuddin represented Mohammedan during their tours of Rangoon, Colombo, Madras, Delhi, Hyderabad and Lahore.

In 1936, Sirajuddin spent a season with Kalighat FC. In 1937, he made a return to Mohammedan, and on 13 November, he represented league champions Mohammedan against the touring Islington Corinthians from Britain at Calcutta FC Ground. The game ended in a 0–0 draw, a result being credited to Sirajuddin and Jumma Khan's performance in the Mohammedan defence. He again played the British team on 25 November, representing Tipperah XI during a 3–0 defeat in Comilla. Notably, the Tipperah XI included several players from the Calcutta Football League, all hailing from the district.

In 1941, he featured in the IFA Shield final for Mohammedan in a 2–0 victory against King's Own Scottish Borderers on 16 August. Earlier that year, he won the league title alongside the Delhi Football Association Shield Tournament and the Montmorency Football Tournament. He was eventually selected to represent the Bengal football team in the 1941–42 Santosh Trophy. He featured for the team during their 5–1 victory over Delhi in the final on 26 July.

In 1942, Serajuddin, along with fellow Mohammedan teammates Noor Mohammed Jr., Taher, Saboo, and Hafiz Rashid, were loaned to Bata SC for their participation in the Rovers Cup. The team eventually won the tournament by defeating Bombay Champions, W.I.A.A. Staff 3–1 in the final on 10 October.

== International career ==
In 1941, he represented the Indian Football Association in their annual international match against Europeans XI, a team composed of British players, winning 3–1.

== Death ==
Sirajuddin died prior to the Independence of Bangladesh.

== Honours ==
Kolkata Mohammedan

- Calcutta League: 1934, 1935, 1937, 1938, 1940, 1941
- IFA Shield: 1941

Bengal

- Santosh Trophy: 1941–42

Bata SC

- Rovers Cup: 1942
