= Saboo (footballer) =

British Indian footballer

Mahbub Khan
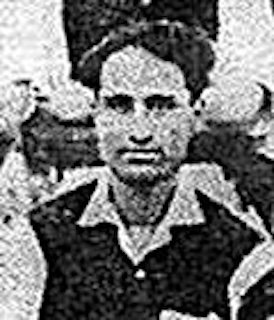
- Saboo with Kolkata Mohammedan in 1940

Personal information
- Full name: Mahbub Khan
- Date of birth: c. 1917
- Place of birth: Unknown (Note: Some sources state he was from North-West Frontier Province, while others state he was from Bangalore.)
- Date of death: 6 June 1980 (aged 64–65)
- Place of death: Bengaluru, India
- Height: 5 ft 11 in (1.80 m)
- Position: Inside left

Senior career*
Years	Team	Apps	(Gls)
19??–19??	Crescent Club Bangalore		
1933–1940s	Mohammedan SC		(45+)
1942	→ Bata SC Calcutta (loan)		

International career
1938–1946	India XI		
- * Club domestic league appearances and goals

Mahbub Khan (c. 1917 – 6 June 1980), commonly known as Saboo, was a footballer who played as a Inside left. He was one of the most well-known players of Kolkata Mohammedan throughout the 1930s and 1940s.

== Club career ==
Saboo (standing in middle, top row) with Mohammedan Sporting in 1934.

Saboo played for the Crescent Club of Bangalore, before joining Mohammedan Sporting Club of Calcutta, where he played for throughout the 1930s as well as the 1940s.

In 1936, Saboo was instrumental in Mohammedan's 1936 IFA Shield triumph, notably scoring a hat-trick in the semi-finals against Howrah Union to win the match 4–0.

In 1940, After an early goal by Noor Mohammad in the 24th minute, Saboo would score the winning goal in the historic 1940 Durand Cup final against the Royal Warwickshire Regiment, securing a 2–1 victory. He also helped the club become the first ever Indian club to win the Durand Cup. He would also finish as the league's top goal-scorer with 11 goals the same year. The following year, In the IFA Shield, he scored seven goals in a ten to nil win for Mohammedan SC. He also played a key role in helping the team win the tournament the very same year, scoring in the final alongside teammate Rashid Khan. As well as netting in 16 goals in the league, becoming the league's top goal-scorer back-to-back.

In 1942, Saboo, along with a few fellow teammates of Mohammedan Sporting were loaned to Bata SC for their participation in the Rovers Cup that year. Players like Noor Mohammed Jr., Taher, Sirajuddin, Hafiz Rashid joined the team, that year, the team managed to reach the final of the tournament. Winning the final match 3–1 against Bombay Champions, W.I.A.A. Staff.

== International career ==
In 1938, Saboo was selected to represent an Indian XI for their tour to Australia. He was also selected to represent the team for their tour of South Africa in 1946.

== Death ==
Saboo died on 6 June 1980 in Bengaluru, India.

== Honours ==
=== Mohammedan Sporting ===
- Calcutta Football League:
  - Winners (7): 1934, 1935, 1936, 1937, 1938, 1940, 1941
- Durand Cup:
  - Winners (1): 1940
- IFA Shield:
  - Winners (3): 1936, 1941, 1942

=== Bata SC ===
- Rovers Cup:
  - Winners (1): 1942
