= Bobby Langton =

English footballer and manager (1918–1996)

Personal information
- Full name: Robert Langton
- Date of birth: 8 September 1918
- Place of birth: Burscough, Lancashire, England
- Date of death: 13 January 1996 (aged 77)
- Place of death: Burscough, England
- Position: Outside left

Youth career
- Burscough Victoria

Senior career*
Years	Team	Apps	(Gls)
1938–1948	Blackburn Rovers	107	(24)
1948–1949	Preston North End	58	(14)
1949–1953	Bolton Wanderers	118	(16)
1953–1956	Blackburn Rovers	105	(33)
1956–1957	Ards	41	(12)
Total		429	(99)

International career
1946–1950	England	11	(1)
- * Club domestic league appearances and goals

Robert Langton (8 September 1918 – 13 January 1996) was an English footballer who played for the majority of his career for Lancashire clubs. He played mostly on the left wing. He represented his country eleven times between 1946 and 1950. After retiring in 1957, he became football manager.

Langton represented Bombay in Santosh Trophy. In mid-20th century, he appeared in Rovers Cup, one of the oldest club football tournaments, with visiting army team.

== Playing career ==
Born in Burscough, he signed for Blackburn Rovers from youth team Burscough Victoria in 1937. He became the team's leading scorer in his second season with fourteen goals but his career was curtailed by the Second World War which he spent part of as a Welch Regiment infantryman in India, although when stationed in Northern Ireland he did help Glentoran to win the Irish Cup in 1945.

He won the first of eleven England caps in a 7–2 defeat of Ireland in 1946 and would go on to play for the national team until 1950 by which time he had changed clubs twice, first to Preston North End for £16,000 in 1948 and then on to Bolton Wanderers for a then club record of £20,000 in November 1949. At Bolton he provided many goals for Willie Moir and Nat Lofthouse, picking up a runners-up medal in the "Matthews Final", in which he assisted a goal for Moir.

In dispute with Bolton in the run up to the final, it proved to be Langton's final game for the club. He returned to Blackburn Rovers in September 1953 and served them for a further three years before seeing out his professional career back in Northern Ireland with Ards. Langton then went into non-league football, with three seasons at Wisbech Town before moving to Kidderminster Harriers and finally seeing his career out with a one-month spell at Colwyn Bay.

== Management career ==
Scouting for Accrington Stanley followed, as well as coaching for King's Lynn and Wisbech before he finally returned home to Burscough to become manager of the local team where he won the Lancashire Combination Cup and the Lancashire Junior Cup. He finally left football in 1971. Bobby Langton died after a short illness in January 1996. Two years later the road that goes past Burscough's ground was renamed Bobby Langton Way after him.

== Honours ==
Bolton Wanderers

- FA Cup runner-up: 1952–53
