= Chibuzor Nwakanma =

Nigerian footballer (1964/65–2022)

Personal information
- Date of birth: 1964 or 1965
- Date of death: 8 April 2022 (aged 57)
- Place of death: Aba, Nigeria
- Position: Striker

Senior career*
Years	Team	Apps	(Gls)
1985–1986	East Bengal		
1987–1991	Mohammedan Sporting		
1993–1995	Mohun Bagan		
1996–1998	Churchill Brothers		
- * Club domestic league appearances and goals

Chibuzor Nwakanma (1964 or 1965 – 8 April 2022) was a Nigerian professional footballer who played for Indian football clubs Mohun Bagan, East Bengal, Mohammedan Sporting, and Churchill Brothers in the 1980s and 90s.

== Early life ==
Nwakanma was born in Nigeria and moved to India to study at the DAV College, Panjab University in Chandigarh in the early 1980s. He met fellow Nigerian footballers Emeka Ezeugo and Christopher Kem, with whom he partnered to help Panjab University win the All-India Inter-Varsity Football Championship in 1985. He also had a degree in theology from Bangalore in India.

== Career ==
Nwakanma was spotted by football scouts during his time at Panjab University. At the recommendation of fellow Nigerian footballer Chima Okorie, who was then playing for Kolkata-based Mohammedan Sporting, he traveled to the city (then known as Calcutta) which at the time was considered as the hub of Indian football. After his studies in Chandigarh, Nwakanma was selected by SC East Bengal, with whom he played for two seasons, before moving over to Mohun Bagan AC and later to Mohammedan Sporting. At Mohun Bagan, he was a member of the team that won the Calcutta Football League, Durand Cup, and Federation Cup in 1994, and at Mohammedan Sporting, he was part of the team that won the Sait Nagjee Football Tournament, Kalinga Cup, and the Bordoloi Trophy. He also represented Indian Football Association in an exhibition game against the visiting Dutch club PSV Eindhoven, coached by Bobby Robson, in 1991. Before his retirement from football in 1998, he also played for the Goan club Churchill Brothers. He also briefly represented Tollygunge Agragami FC and participated in the Bangladesh Premier League.

== Style of play ==
Nwakanma was amongst the first few foreign players to play in the Indian domestic football scene, representing the "big three" of Indian football clubs, Mohun Bagan, East Bengal, and Mohammedan Sporting. With a diminutive frame, Nwakanma was known for his goal-scoring abilities, and was noted to have been a household name in India at the time. He was known for his pace, control, powerful shooting and his dribbling skills. In a career spanning over two decades, he scored over 160 goals.

== Personal life ==
Nwakanma was known to be religious and became a pastor on his return to Nigeria after his retirement from professional football. He also established an academy in Lagos focusing his efforts on using football as means to keep young people away from a life of crime.

Nwakanma died on 8 April 2022 from a cardiac arrest at his home in Aba, Nigeria. He was aged 57.
