= Jumma Khan =

Pakistani footballer

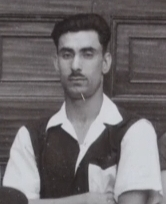
- Khan with Kolkata Mohammedan in 1935

Personal information
- Date of birth: 1912
- Place of birth: Quetta, British India
- Date of death: May 1948 (aged 35–36)
- Place of death: Quetta, Pakistan
- Height: 5 ft 11 in (1.80 m)
- Position: Defender

Senior career*
Years	Team	Apps	(Gls)
1932–1933	Sandemanians		
1934–1944	Mohammedan Sporting		
1945–??	Bhawanipore		

International career
1938	India	4	(0)
- * Club domestic league appearances and goals

Jumma Khan was a Pakistani footballer who played as a defender. He is regarded as one of the most prominent players of Kolkata Mohammedan during the 1930s. Born in the Quetta district in the Baluchistan Agency in British India, he represented India during their 1938 tour to Australia.

== Early life ==
Khan hailed from Quetta in the Baluchistan Agency of British India.

== Club career ==
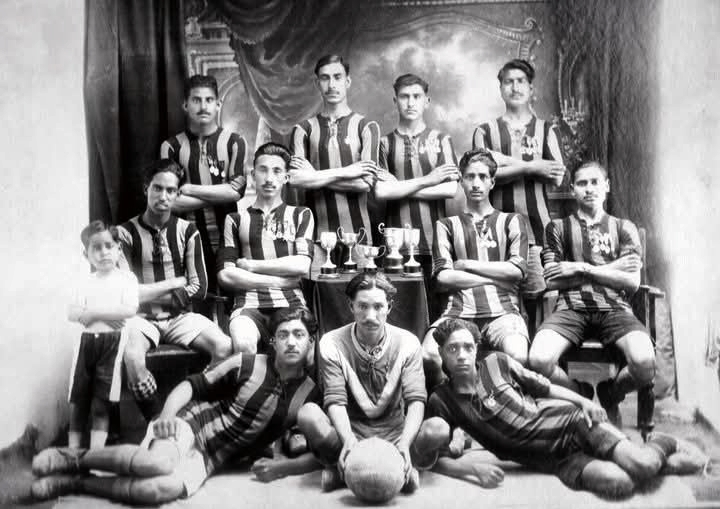
Jumma (second from left, standing row) with Sandemanians Club.

Jumma played for the Sandemanians Club of Quetta, being a part of the team till 1933.

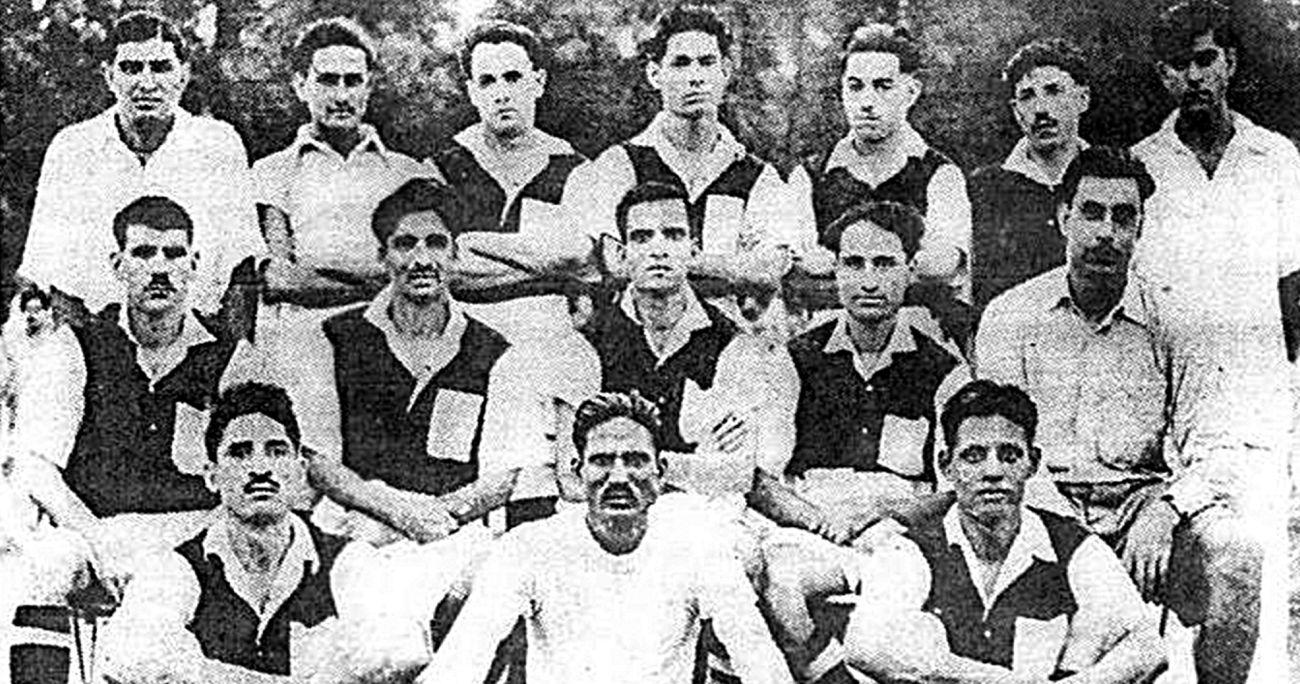
Jumma (sitting far right in middle) with 1940 CFL winning Kolkata Mohammedan.

Khan then joined Kolkata Mohammedan, playing for the team from 1934 till 1944, and was also part of the golden era of the team during this period. He played as a regular left full back along with fellow right fullback Sirajuddin. He was elected captain of the team in 1944. Khan eventually left the club and joined Bhawanipore Club.

== International career ==
Khan played for India XI in several international matches against European and Australian teams. Along with making appearances against China and Burma.

In 1938, he played for India against Australia during their maiden full international tour to Australia. Khan and A. Premlal were selected from the Frontier Province to represent the national team during the tour.

== Personal life and death ==
After the 0–1 loss of Kolkata Mohammedan in the Calcutta Football League championship match against rivals Mohun Bagan in 1944 due to "treachery" of some fellow players, Khan had reportedly experienced psychological shock, and was later attacked by tuberculosis, from which he died in his hometown Quetta in 1948. He had reportedly come back to Calcutta in 1945 to approach the club authorities of his club for treatment, but was unable to get any help.

In May 1950, a football tournament was held in his memory in Quetta.

== Honours ==
=== Mohammedan Sporting ===
- Calcutta Football League:
  - Winners (7): 1934, 1935, 1936, 1937, 1938, 1940, 1941
- Durand Cup:
  - Winners (1): 1940
- IFA Shield:
  - Winners (3): 1936, 1941, 1942
