= Mohammedan SC (Kolkata) =

Association football club in Kolkata, India

Mohammedan Sporting Club
- Full name: Mohammedan Sporting Club
- Nicknames: Black and White Brigade; The Black Panthers
- Short name: MSC; MDSC
- Founded: 22 February 1891; 135 years ago
- Ground: Kishore Bharati Krirangan Salt Lake Stadium Kalyani Stadium Mohammedan Sporting Ground
- Capacity: 12,000; 85,000; 20,000; 15,000
- Owner: Mohammedan SC Pvt Ltd (100%)
- President: Ghazal Uz Zafar
- Head coach: Saheed Ramon
- League: Indian Super League
- 2025–26: Indian Super League, 14th of 14 (relegated)
Home colours	Away colours

Mohammedan Sporting Club, commonly referred to as Mohammedan, is an Indian multi-sports club based in Kolkata, West Bengal. The club is best known for their professional men's football section which competes in the Indian Football League, the second tier of the Indian football league system, as well as the Calcutta Football League (CFL), the oldest football league in Asia. Formed in February 1891, it is one of the oldest active football clubs in the country. Mohammedan is the first Indian club to win the Durand Cup, also the first Indian club to win an overseas tournament.

The club became affiliated with the Indian Football Association (IFA) to play in the second division of CFL before earning promotion to the premier division of CFL in 1933 and a year later, Mohammedan became the first Indian team to win the league and in 1938 became the first team to win it five consecutive times. After the independence of India, Mohammedan became the first Indian club to win a football tournament on foreign soil by lifting the Aga Khan Gold Cup in 1960. In 1996, the club was one of the founding members of India's first nationwide league — National Football League (NFL). For all its laurels, Mohammedan has never won a top-tier league, only managing to win the 2004–05 NFL Second Division to qualify for NFL, and the 2020 I-League qualifiers to qualify for I-League, which was then the first-tier league of India. They have won the Federation Cup twice in 1983–84 and 1984–85.

Founded during the early years of India's independence movement, Mohammedan had been a symbol of progressive Muslim identity through the tumultuous period of freedom struggle in colonial Bengal and the subsequent struggle for status in an altered post-partition landscape. Therefore, the club is primarily supported by the Muslim population of Bengal and it had provided a major backing to the community residing in Kolkata by spreading the sport to a sizeable population during its foundation days. This led to communal rivalry with its cross-town competitors — East Bengal and Mohun Bagan, which were primarily supported by the Hindu population of Bengal during the early decades.

== History ==
=== The beginning and early decades (1887–1930) ===
In 1887, under the leadership of Khan Bahadur Aminul Islam, a sporting club named Jubilee Club was founded, which was later renamed into Crescent Club and Hamidia Club. Finally in 1891, Islam named it Mohammedan Sporting Club to represent the Bengali Mohammedans living in Calcutta.

The third annual meeting of the club, which was presided over by John Woodburn.

The club participated in a number of local tournaments after its foundation but came into prominence only after they won the Cooch Behar Cup in 1902, 1906, and notably in 1909, with Syed Ali Ahmed as captain, the team defeated Mohun Bagan.

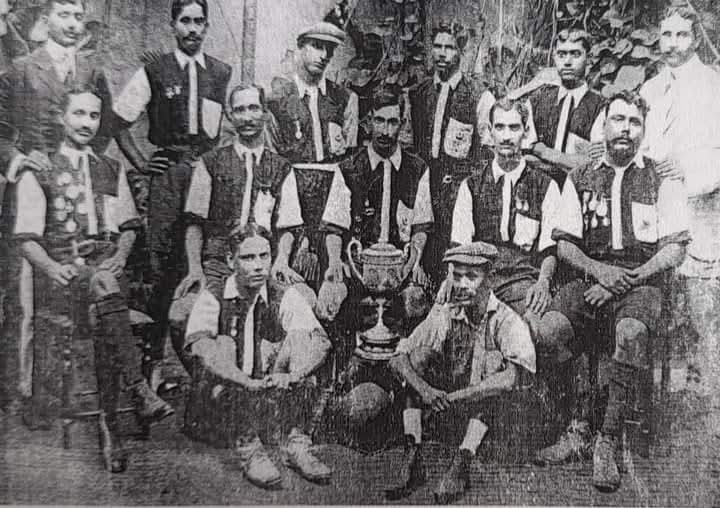
The Mohammedan squad that won the Cooch Behar Cup in 1909

Khan Sahib Syed Ahmed Rashid took a very keen interest in the social and sporting life in Bengal and was the elected Joint Secretary of Mohammedan, from 1925 to 1932. Although it was not before 1927 that the financial condition of the club improved when the team was able to play in the second division of the Calcutta Football League (CFL). In order to overcome the precarious financial state of the club, the Joint Secretaries of the club made an appeal to the public "to support a scheme of the club, extending its activities in the social sphere of Muslims", and also requested for donations of ₹3,500 to ₹4,500. With the improved performances of the club in every sport it participated, the management was able to acquire a considerable amount of investment which helped the club to build better teams. Due to Rashid's widespread influence in sports in Bengal, Sir Francis Stanley Jackson, the Governor of Bengal, accepted the patronage of the club.

During the Satyagraha movement, Rashid helped to organise and make the club participate in the Monsoon League in 1930, the CFL in 1930 and 1931, and number of other sports tournaments, when every native club was boycotting sporting events, which was greatly appreciated by IFA, Bengal Hockey Association and Cricket Board of Control in Bengal and Assam. In 1930, Mohammedan finished last in the league table and was on the verge of being relegated from the CFL 2nd Division, but was allowed to continue when one of the second division teams – East Indian Railway discontinued.

=== The golden period (1931–1947) ===
One of the club officials, CA Aziz concentrated on creating a strong team through modern strategies and was one of the only Indians to first realise the importance of playing in boots. Aziz recruited Mohun Bagan rejects like Kalu Khan and Hafiz Rashid in 1933, and also players from different parts of India were gradually brought in, often in the name of religion. The whole team had a Muslim core, with no players outside the community. This helped Aziz to create unmatched unity in his squad which showed on and off the field. In 1933, Mohammedan qualified for the premier division of CFL for the first time in its history by topping the second division, under the captaincy of Habibullah Bahar Chowdhury.

Under the captaincy of Khurshid Anwar, Mohammedan became the first native club to capture the CFL title in 1934, in their very first year in top division. In March 1935, he was unanimously elected as the General Secretary of the club for the second time and in October that year he organised a successful tour to Rangoon, Mandalay, Maymyo, Colombo, Galle, Kandy, Madras, Bangalore and Mysore for the football team. The tour of Burma undertaken by Mohammedan Club proved to be a valuable experience for the side, as the team encountered strong opposition and competitive standards of football. On 10 October, the team played against University of Ragoon football team, conceding four goals and reducing the margin by one goal. Regardless, the team defeated the Rangoon League Champions, Burma Police, by five goals, with Rahmat and Rahim scoring two, along with Abbas Mirza. The team also played several matches against colleges and universities teams, another match which was regarded as a game full of rough play was against the Friends Union, who were runners-up in the league, the match ended in a 0–0 draw.

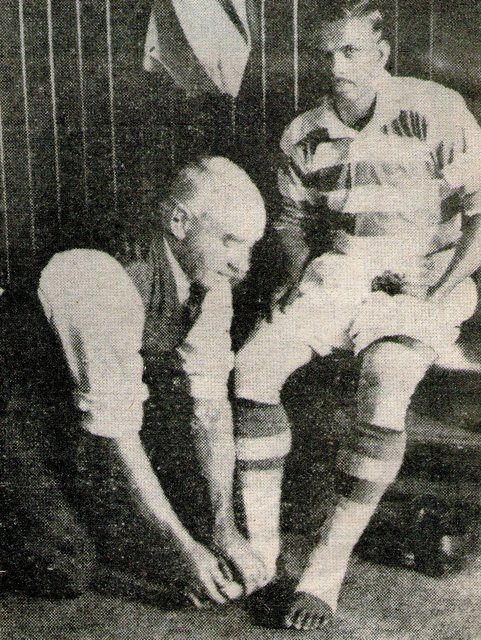
Mohammed Salim played for Mohammedan during 1926–1927 and 1934–1937.

In late October, the team arrived in Ceylon. The first match against Colombo League XI resulted in a 4–1 victory, with Habib scoring two, Mohiuddin and Shedule scoring the remaining two goals. Their next match ended in a 1–1 draw against an All-Ceylon XI. With Mohammedan scoring through Rahmat and Chambers equalizing for the opposition. The team then beat the Saxer Club on 5 November by 3–1, at half-time, the team led by a goal, with Habib and Mohiuddin scoring later on. The team was defeated by a Colombo City League XI by 0–1, with a goal from Buhar of the opposition. They drew against the Amateur League XI, thanks to a late goal by Salim. And faced up against Ceylon Mohammedan, which they won 2–0, and Habib along with Mohinuddin scoring in the match. Lastly, they played a match at Galle, against a Galle XI, winning 3–1, with Habib scoring twice along with a goal from Mohinuddin.

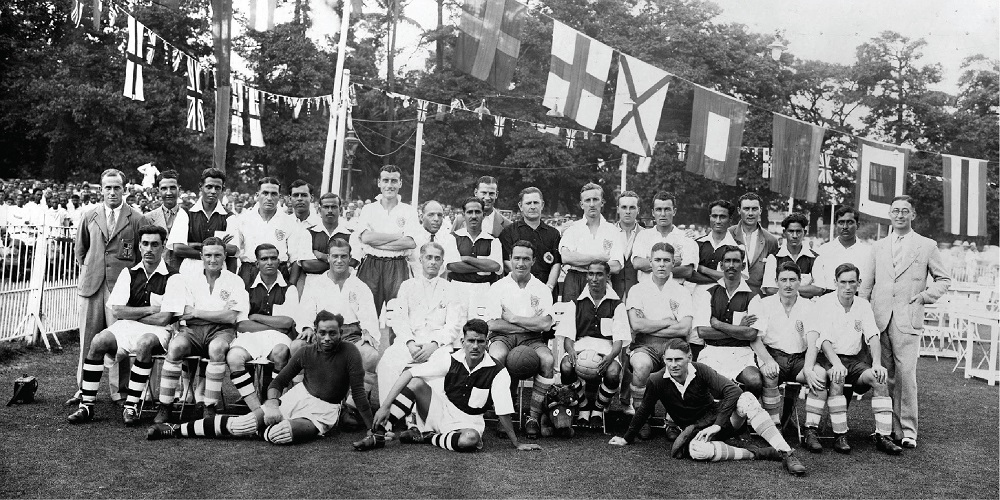
Mohammedan vs Islington Corinthians in 1937.

Mohammedan vs Bangalore Muslims in the Rovers Cup final.

That same year, the captain's armband was handed over to the young and charismatic Abbas Mirza and later in the summer, Mohammedan recruited goalkeeper Osman Jan from Crescent Club in Delhi. With Osman Jan under the bar, Taj Mohammad Sr., Jumma Khan and Sirajuddin were part of a strong and formidable back-line. Along with new and young recruits every year, two defining names remained constant in the team – Syed Abdus Samad, who joined in 1933, and Mohammed Salim, who returned for a second spell in 1934. In 1936, Mohammedan became the first all-Indian team since 1911 to win IFA Shield by defeating Calcutta CFC in the final by 2–1 with goals from Rashid Jr. and Rahim. During this time, Salim took trials at Celtic, and was selected for the team but after playing two friendlies in Scottish Football Alliance, he returned to Mohammedan being homesick, even though being offered contracts from Celtic as well as from clubs in Germany. Thus, he became the first Indian to play for a foreign club. From 1934 to 1938, Mohammedan won the league for record five consecutive times and missed out the title only once in 1939 from 1934 to 1941, when they declined to play in protest against IFA. On 13 November 1937, Mohammedan held the touring English side Islington Corinthians to a goalless draw in Calcutta.

Mohammedan's another great achievement came in the form of Durand Cup, which was then reserved only for British and British-Indian regimental teams until 1940, when civilian teams were also allowed to participate due to most regiments called in for World War II. The final was scheduled on 12 December 1940 at Irwin Amphitheatre in New Delhi and numerous eminent Muslim politicians flew in from far-off cities like Calcutta, Dacca, Hyderabad and Bhopal, while common supporters arrived in trains and tongas to watch the match. It was also the first time a football game of such importance was being officiated by an Indian referee, Captain Harnam Singh. Along with around 1,00,000 spectators, as per traditions, Lord Linlithgow, the Viceroy of India, stood witness as Mohammedan defeated Royal Warwickshire Regiment 2–1, under the captaincy of Masum and goals coming from Noor Mohammad Jr. and Saboo. This victory by a team of only Muslim players at the capital city provided a massive boost to the Muslim national movement in the country. They also captured the Rover's Cup without conceding a goal in the tournament and beating Bangalore Muslims 1–0 in the final, thus creating another unique record of holding CFL, Durand Cup and Rover's Cup titles all in the same year. Their successes led to frenzied support from Muslims in every city of India, followed by increased number of donations to improve the club. They had an abundance of finances and were the first Indian team to play with boots, with a focus on proper diet and physical fitness for their players. In 1941, they won their second Shield, when they beat King's Own Scottish Borderers in the final. They also became the first Indian team to score 100 goals in a year, when they scored 110 goals in all competitions that year. They also became the first Indian club to retain the Shield, when they saw off East Bengal's challenge in 1942 final with a goal from Noor Mohammad. Due to the huge popularity, in 1943, Kaiser Shumsher Jung Bahadur Rana, the Prime Minister of Nepal, came all the way to Calcutta to play for Mohammedan, thus he became the first non-Muslim and Hindu player to don Mohammedan colours. The following years until the Independence of India, Mohammedan lost its dominance and failed to bring back any major silverware into their club tent.

=== Considerable period of success (1947–1980) ===
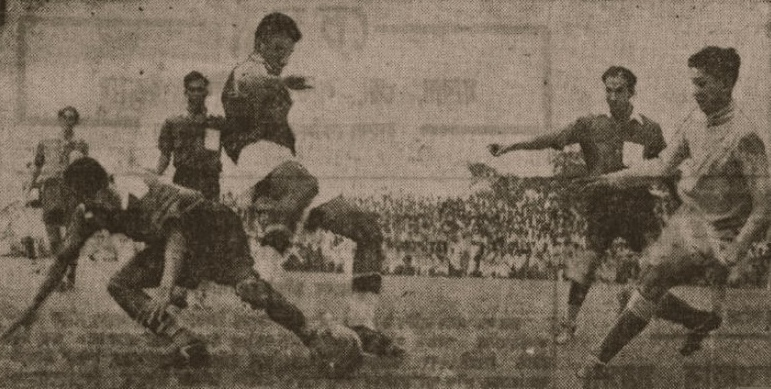
Nikhil Nandy (L) tackling Muhammad Umer during a 1956 Calcutta League match between Mohammedan & Eastern Railway

After the partition in 1947, the club lost many of its elite patrons, members as well as players, who chose to move to newly formed Islamic state of Pakistan, and soon there was a struggle to run which became evident with the club's performance in major tournaments. Yet, few players returned to continue playing for Mohammedan as foreign nationals. Nevertheless, they became the first Indian club to win Calcutta League post independence.

Mohammedan continued to bring in numerous football talents from the neighboring country, including Pakistani international Masood Fakhri, who joined the club in 1955. After 8 years of title drought, Mohammedan went on to win the Rover's Cup for the second time in 1956 by beating the defending champions Mohun Bagan 3–1 in the final. The Rover's Cup win paved the way to regain Mohammedan's lost dominance over football in India and bagged the League-Shield double of CFL and IFA Shield next year. In the league, Mohammedan surpassed East Bengal by a point, they achieved the league title on 10 August 1957, after a drought of nine years since they last won the league in 1948. The game would be played against Wari Club, with Mohammedan winning the match 4–0, with Abid Ghazi scoring a brace, and Salahuddin and Umer netting in a goal each respectively. The team also defeated Railways 3–0 in the Shield final.

By the 1960s, Mohammedan changed its rules and formed teams with players from other communities too. In 1960, as a top club of India, Mohammedan was invited to the 1960 edition of the Aga Khan Gold Cup, which was at that time considered a continental tournament to determine the unofficial Asian champions. Held in Dhaka, Mohammedan became the first Indian side to win a trophy on foreign soil, beating the Perserikatan champions Persatuan Sepakbola Makassar 4–1 in the final. The match is still considered to be one of the greatest matches ever played in Dhaka, and also featured renowned Pakistani forward Muhammad Umer Baloch for Mohammedan. Despite considerably low performance domestically, Mohammedan was still one of the biggest crowd pullers, especially in Delhi, during Durand Cup and DCM Trophy. The next CFL success came only after a decade since their last win, when Mohammedan became the champions without losing a single match, registering their tenth CFL title. In 1971, Mohammedan won the IFA Shield without conceding a goal and by defeating Tollygunge Agragami 2–0 in the final.

=== Gradual downfall and a period of major failure (1981–2019) ===
In the 80s, the success came at the beginning with Mohammedan winning the 1981 CFL unbeaten for the third time, surpassing Mohun Bagan by a point. The following year, Mohammedan appointed one of the iconic Indian footballers, Syed Nayeemuddin to coach the team and also roped in the biggest foreign names, Iranian duo Majid Bishkar and Jamshid Nassiri, from their local rivals East Bengal. Bishkar became the first player to play for Mohammedan with the experience of appearing in FIFA World Cup. In 1983, Mohammedan won its first Federation Cup, which was then the only true national championship, by defeating Mohun Bagan 2–0 in the final, and successfully defended the Cup by defeating East Bengal 1–0 in the next year's final. In 1985, they signed Nigerian striker Chima Okorie from Chandigarh FC, who was considered one of the greatest foreign players in India. The later 80s saw a continued drop in performance, winning only minor silverwares with only major success coming in the form of 1987 Rover's Cup. In 1990, Mohammedan participated in the Jawaharlal Nehru Centenary Club Cup, which was the only international club tournament held in India. Mohammedan, as the only Indian team, qualified for the semi-finals by defeating the Zambian national team 1–0 and Metalist 1925 Kharkiv 1–0 but losing 2–0 to Gimnasia Esgrima. In the semi-final, Mohammedan lost 1–0 to Paraguayan Primera División champion Club Olimpia. Nigerian midfielder Emeka Ezeugo of Mohammedan was awarded Taj Bengal Trophy for player of the tournament. Mohammedan was nominated from India to participate in the 1992–93 Asian Cup Winners' Cup and was scheduled to play against Omani Professional League champions Fanja SC in the first round but they withdrew their team from the competition. Near the end of the century, the players were being unpaid for months at a time and coaches were frequently being replaced due to unimproved performance. Mohammedan's trophy drought continued and in 1996 they became one of the founding members of India's first national league – National Football League (NFL). Under the coaching of newly appointed Mridul Banerjee, Mohammedan finished in the bottom two of group table and was relegated to NFL 2nd Division in their debut season. In 1996, the club took part in Bangabandhu Cup in Bangladesh. In the following season, Mohammedan finished in the bottom half of the group table, therefore getting relegated from NFL 2nd Division as well.

After two seasons, Mohammedan once again qualified for NFL 2nd Division in 2000–01 only to get relegated once again. With hopes of improving the standards, Mohammedan signed their first foreign coach, former Nigerian club player, Chibuzor Nwakanma. In the next season, the club played in the NFL 2nd Division under the coaching of Mohammed Habib and achieved promotion by finishing second in the final league table. Club icon, Nassiri, was put in-charge for the club's second NFL campaign by newly appointed technical director, PK Banerjee, a renowned footballer as well as coach himself, but Mohammedan suffered another relegation. With the return of Habib as the coach, the club successfully won the 2004–05 NFL 2nd Division, thereby achieving promotion. With renowned tactician Subhas Bhowmick at the helm, the club finished eighth in the 2005–06 NFL and avoided relegation from NFL for the first time, but the following season they eventually got relegated by finishing ninth in the table.

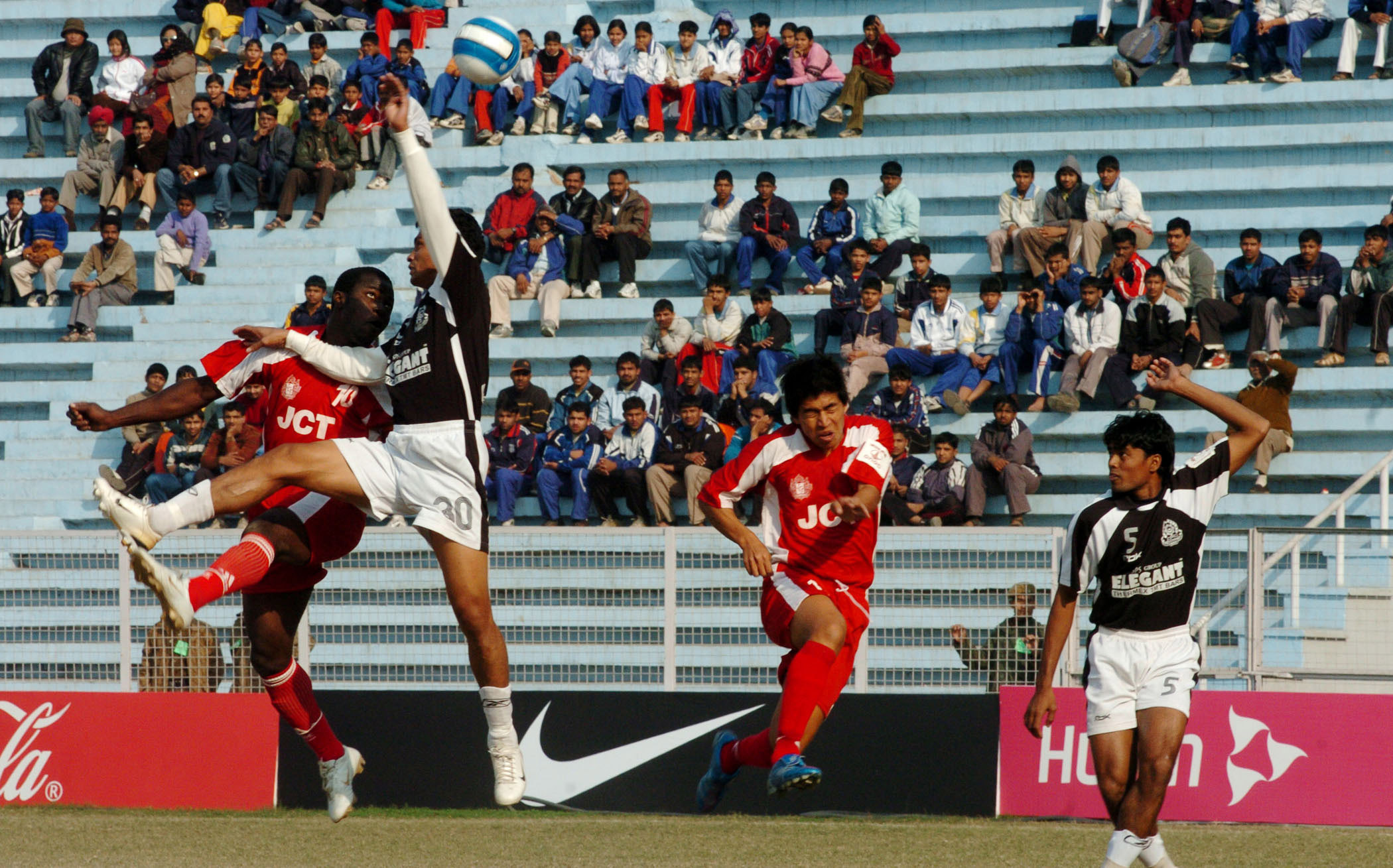
Inaugural match of 2006–07 NFL against JCT Mills at Ambedkar Stadium

Until then, NFL and NFL 2nd Division were semi-professional football leagues, but in 2007 the leagues were reformed into professional I-League and I-League 2nd Division respectively. With the appointment of Shabbir Ali as the official coach of the club, Mohammedan achieved promotion to 2008–09 I-League but got relegated after finishing eleventh in the table. In November 2010, Mohammedan organised Platinum Jubilee Celebration Cup tournament to commemorate the 75th anniversary of their 1934 CFL win, with Mohun Bagan, East Bengal and the world's oldest existing football club Sheffield FC being invited to play. As brand ambassador of Mohammedan, former Indian cricket captain Sourav Ganguly played for the club, wearing number 99 jersey, against East Bengal in a 1–0 defeat. The tournament culminated with a Kolkata Derby, where East Bengal emerged victorious after a penalty shoot-out. In 2013, under Sanjoy Sen, Mohammedan would achieve promotion to I-League and also put an end to a long wait for major success by winning Durand Cup and then the 2014 IFA Shield by beating Bangladesh Premier League runners-up Sheikh Jamal DC in the penalty shootout. But once again faced relegation in the 2013–14 I-League after finishing at the bottom of the table. Later in 2015, they participated in Sheikh Kamal Club Cup in Bangladesh.

The club showed major signs of reformation in 2016, when Ghazal Uz Zafar, a Kolkata-based young entrepreneur, took over as the General Secretary of the club. It was under his secretaryship, the club became runners-up in 2016 CFL after eight years and also lifted the 2016 Sikkim Governor's Gold Cup for the first time since 1980 by defeating Jhapa XI of Nepal by 1–0. In 2018, they emerged as the champions of Bordoloi Trophy, defeating Oil India Limited by 3–1 margin. But their wait for success in the national league and other major tournaments was yet to come to an end.

=== Revival of the lost glory & promotion to ISL (2020–present) ===
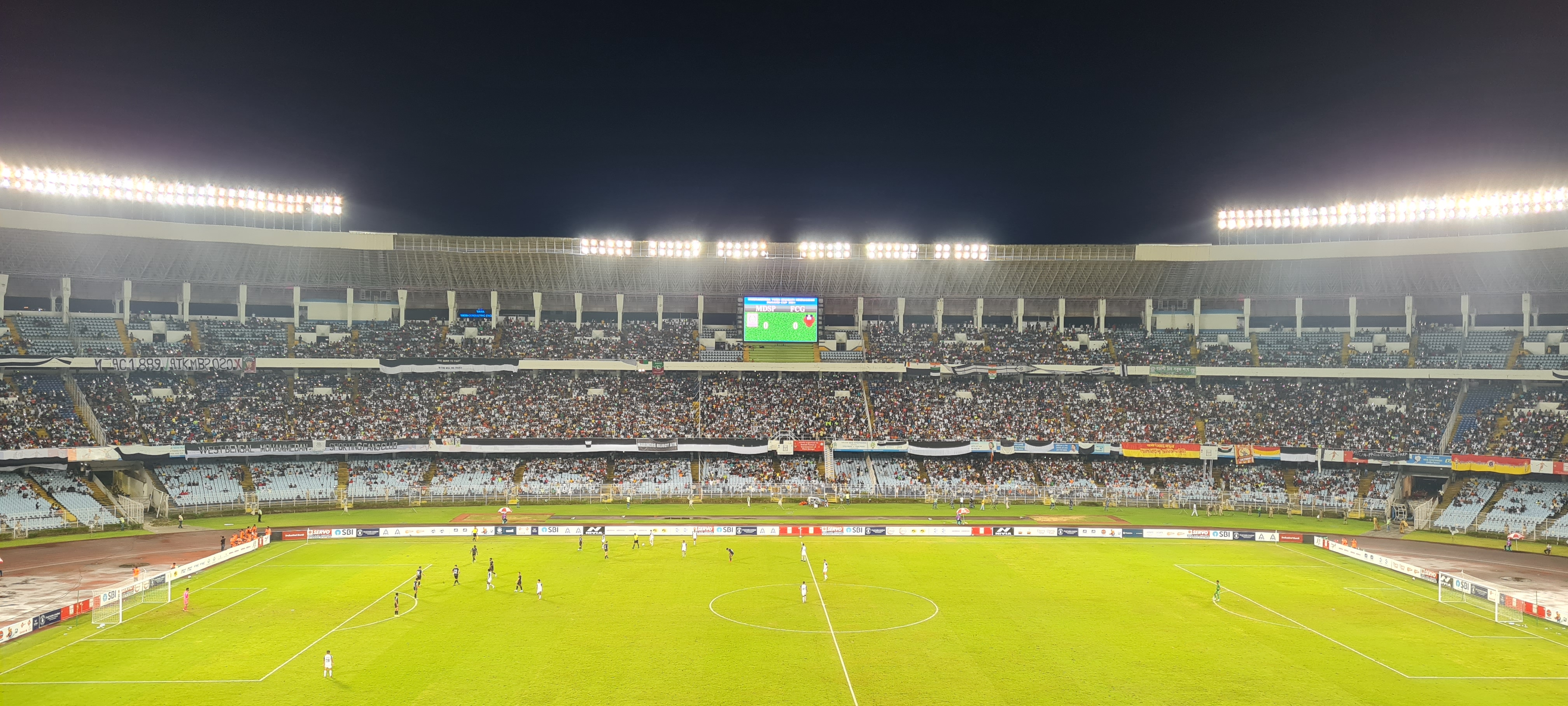
Match between Mohammedan and Goa in 2021 Durand Cup final at Vivekananda Yuba Bharati Krirangan

In October 2020, under the secretaryship of Sheikh Wasim Akram, Mohammedan for the first time entered into a joint venture with a Gurgaon-based sport management company Bunkerhill, with an aim to eventually qualify or enter the Indian Super League, which had been promoted as the top-tier league in 2019. With newly appointed Spanish coach José Hevia, Mohammedan got promoted to 2020–21 I-League after winning 2020 I-League Qualifiers, which temporarily had replaced the traditional I-League 2nd Division due to COVID-19 pandemic restrictions. The club signed previous I-League season's top scorer, Pedro Manzi along with Bangladeshi football team captain Jamal Bhuyan for their AFC quota. After Hevia being sacked mid-season, Mohammedan finished at sixth under their technical director Sankarlal Chakraborty. In May 2021, the club appointed Russia's former assistant coach Andrey Chernyshov, and with him at the helm, Mohammedan reached the Durand Cup final for the first time since 2013 but fell short against FC Goa by just a solitary goal. The following month, Mohammedan clinched their twelfth CFL title after forty long years of wait by defeating Railway FC 1–0 in the final of a newer and shorter knock-out format. As one of the title contenders with Serbian midfielder Nikola Stojanović holding the captain's arm-band and Trinbagonian international Marcus Joseph leading the goalscoring charts by 15 goals, Mohammedan for the first time ran for their maiden national league title at 2021–22 I-League, but finished second after a 2–1 defeat against the table toppers Gokulam Kerala on the final matchday in a must win situation.

In October, the club retained their CFL title. On 6 April 2024, Mohammedan scripted history winning their maiden I-League title in 2023–24 season, which helped the club securing promotion to the Indian Super League. Prior to the 2024–25 Indian Super League season, Shrachi Sports Ventures acquired a 50% stake from existing investor Bunkerhill in a deal that reshaped the club's ownership structure. The new investment distribution saw Shrachi Sports and Bunkerhill holding 30.5% each, while Mohammedan Sporting retained 39% share.

On 16 September 2024, the club played their debut match in the Indian Super League against NorthEast United, which they lost 1–0. The club's first goal in the Indian Super League came in their second match, with Alexie Gomez scoring from penalty spot against FC Goa in a 1–1 draw. The first victory for the club in Indian Super League came in their third league match against Chennaiyan, in their 1–0 away win on 26 September.

During the latter half of the season, the club entered a financial crisis following a dispute between the club and its investors, Shrachi Sports and Bunkerhill Private Limited, over the execution of agreed share transfers and operational control. In January 2025, the investors halted funding of football operations, resulting in delays in player and staff salary payments and uncertainty surrounding the club's participation in the Indian Super League. Amid the financial difficulties, head coach Andrey Chernyshov left the club after not receiving his contractual salary dues.

In April 2025, Shrachi Sports formally communicated its intention to withdraw from the project to the league organisers, leaving the club without a principal investor and raising concerns regarding its ability to meet licensing and operational requirements for the Indian Super League. The club subsequently faced mounting financial liabilities, including unpaid contractual dues owed to former players and coaching staff.

In the 2024–25 Indian Super League, the club went through disastrous campaign, finished at bottom of the regular season table, gaining only 13 points.

In June 2025, FIFA warned the club of disciplinary action after the club failed to clear outstanding contractual dues owed to former head coach Andrey Chernyshov. In July 2025, FIFA officially imposed a registration ban on the club for non-payment of dues to former player Mirjalol Kasimov. The sanction barred the club from registering any new players, domestic or foreign, until the payments were settled and could remain in force for up to three transfer windows. A second transfer ban was imposed after the club failed to clear outstanding wages owed to Argentine midfielder Alexis Gómez.

==== 2025–26 season: All-Indian squad ====
Ahead of the 2025–26 season, the club continued without confirmed external investment and adopted cost-control measures while attempting to stabilise its finances. Owing to the FIFA restrictions and financial uncertainty, the club prepared for the season with an entirely all-Indian squad, retaining the majority of its domestic core players. The team suffered early eliminations in the Durand Cup and the Super Cup.

In January 2026, the Indian Super League season commenced, with the club entering the competition without a single foreign player due to the ongoing registration restrictions.

== Crest, colours and kits ==
=== Crest ===
The crest of Mohammedan Sporting Club is derived from the typical Islamic iconographic symbol used in various historical contexts. It has the star and crescent in middle, which is partially surrounded by floral patterns and, the name of the club, its year of foundation and the country based inscribed below within the shapes of waving banners. The colour of the crest is also in accordance to the Quranic colour of green.

=== Colours ===
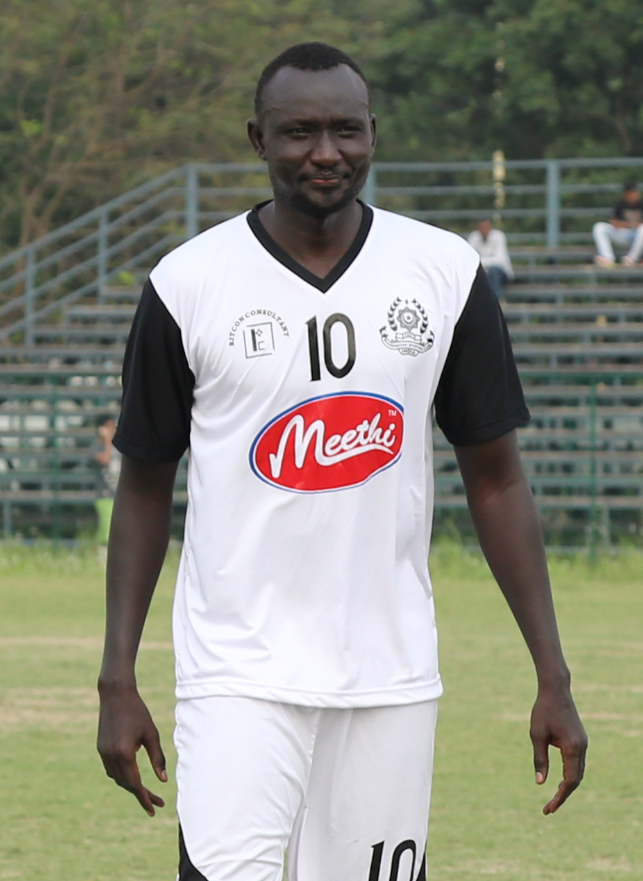
James Moga at Mohammedan's kit launch for 2016–17 season

The club had adopted the nickname of Black Panthers since their Blank Panther inspired jerseys for 2020–21 season, which also resembled their traditional club colours of black (primary) and white (secondary), hence historically they were often termed as "সাদা–কালো ব্রিগেড" (transl. Black and White Brigade).

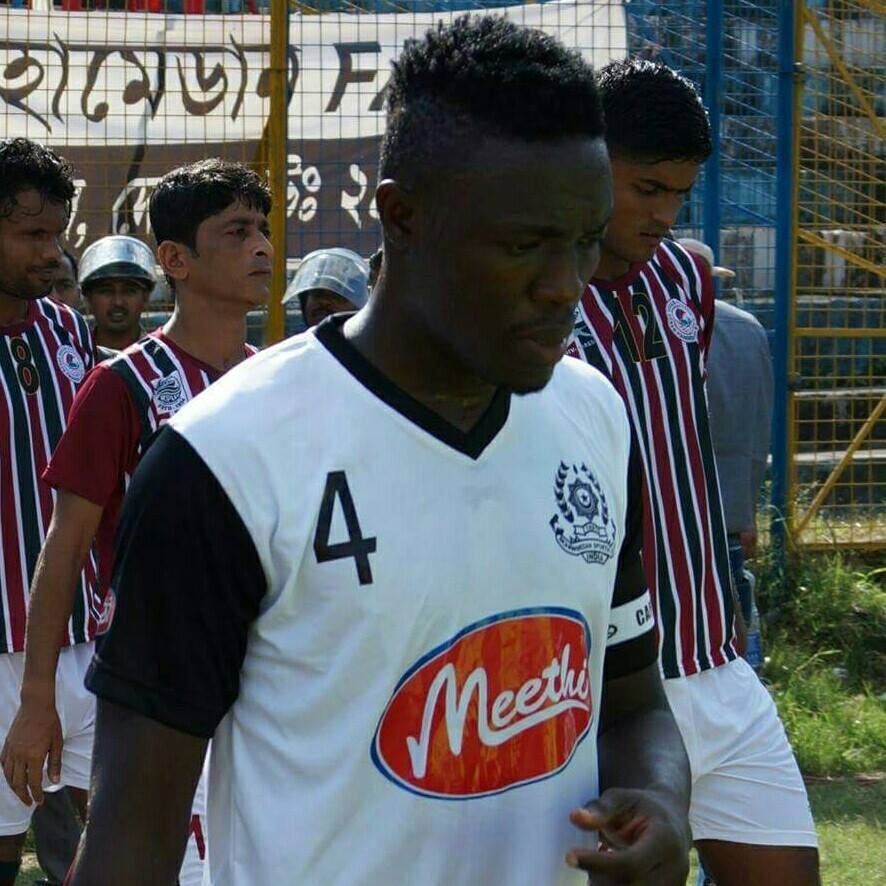
Nigerian player Kareem Omolaja in Mohammedan kit, 2016

=== Kit manufacturer and shirt sponsors ===
Year	Manufacturer	Primary sponsor
2005–07	Reebok	Elegant Steel
2007–08	Reebok	Reliance Group
2008–09	Reebok	Eastern Minerals & Trading Agency
2016–19	Kaizen	Orion Impression
2019–20	Rocky Sports	
2020–21	Trak-Only	Bunkerhill
2021–22	Hummel	Bunkerhill
2022–23	Trak-Only	Bunkerhill
2023–24	SIX5SIX	OpinionEdge
2024–25	SIX5SIX	DafaNews
2025–	Rocky Sports	

=== Slogan ===
"Jaan Jaan Mohammedan" (Bengali: 'জান জান মহামেডান') is the slogan popular among club supporters.

== Stadiums ==
Historically, to host their home games, the club has used several grounds in Kolkata, Howrah, Barasat and Kalyani, including Eden Gardens, which has been reserved for cricket since Vivekananda Yuba Bharati Krirangan opened in 1984.

=== Vivekananda Yuba Bharati Krirangan ===
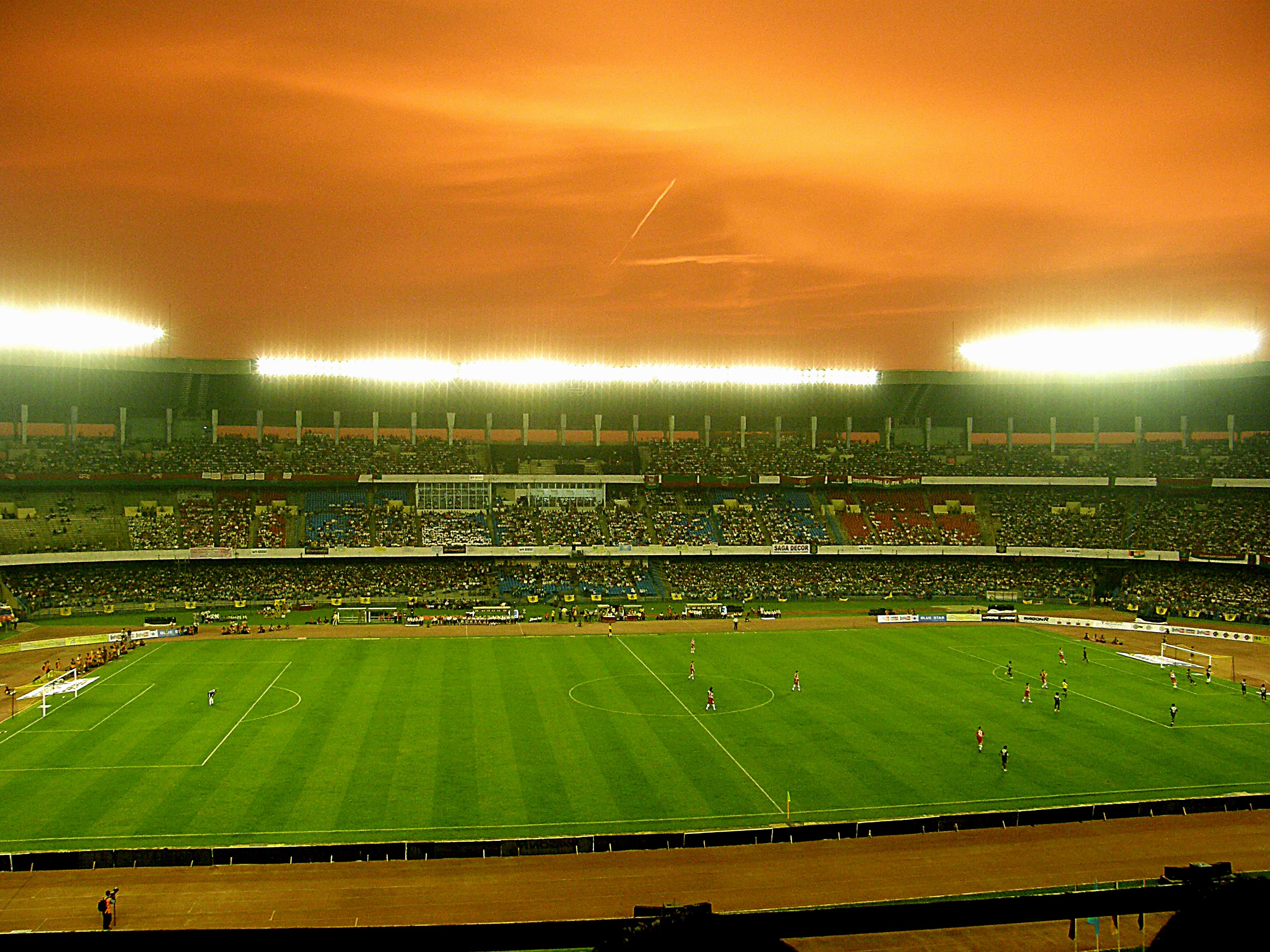
The Salt Lake Stadium in Kolkata

Mohammedan plays its major fixtures at Vivekananda Yuba Bharati Krirangan, commonly called Salt Lake Stadium, located in the suburb of Bidhannagar in Kolkata. A multi-purpose stadium owned by the Government of West Bengal under Youth Affairs and Sports Department, the VYKB primarily hosts football matches, apart from occasional track and field events. The stadium was built in 1984, predominately for matches like Kolkata Derby that featured attendance too huge for the grounds in Maidan to accommodate. Before its renovation in 2011, it was the largest football stadium in the world by capacity of 120,000. Prior to the construction and opening of Rungrado 1st of May Stadium in 1989, it was the largest football stadium in the world. It is currently the fourth largest sports stadium in Asia by capacity. The gigantic stadium features three tiers of concrete galleries with nine entry gates, including a VIP gate, and 30 ramps for the spectators to reach the viewing blocks. The stadium has been mostly used to host major home games like in the Indian Super League, National Football League and the I-League. Since its promotion to Indian Super League in 2024, Mohammedan uses it to host the derbies against the other two Kolkata giants in ISL, East Bengal and Mohun Bagan.

=== Mohammedan Sporting Ground ===
The Mohammedan Sporting Ground is operated by Mohammedan, which is located in Maidan on the northern side of Fort William and adjacent to the club tent. The ground has natural grass turf with a capacity of 25,000. After the renovations in 2017, the ground was installed with floodlights, an air-conditioned press room and a gymnasium named after The Greatest Muhammad Ali to honour his visit to the club in December 1990. Currently, the stadium is used by the club's senior football team as their training facility and also hosts matches of the Calcutta Football League, lower division leagues and youth tournaments.

=== Kishore Bharati Krirangan ===
Kishore Bharati Krirangan is a multi-purpose stadium in Kolkata, West Bengal. used mainly for football matches. The capacity of the stadium is 12,000 and the size of the sports complex is 13 acres. The stadium plays host to Mohammedan SC's non-derby Indian Super League matches and lower division Calcutta Football League matches. It has occasionally hosted Calcutta Premier Division matches. Sports meets of different schools are also held here.

== Rivalry ==
=== Rivalry of the Big Three ===
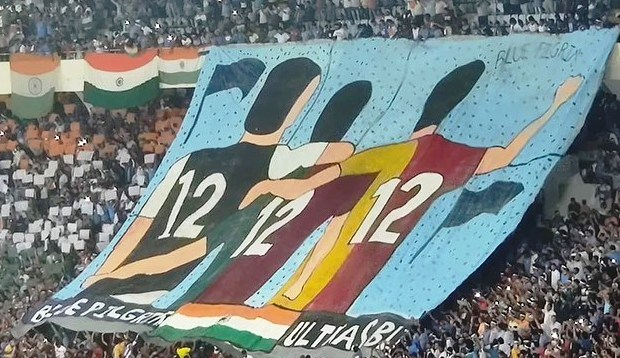
Tifo displaying fans of (left to right) Mohammedan, Mohun Bagan and East Bengal united as the 12th man in support for India at Vivekananda Yuba Bharati Krirangan in 2019

Mohammedan has significant rivalry with the neighbouring clubs – Mohun Bagan and East Bengal. The initiation of the feuds goes back to the early 30s, when Mohammedan came out as a dominant contender for Calcutta Football League by winning seven out of eight titles from 1934 to 1941. Since then until 1958, all the CFL titles were won among these three rival clubs, often referred as the Big Three of Maidan (Bengali: ময়দানের তিন প্রধান), and even in other major tournaments like the Durand Cup, Rovers Cup and IFA Shield, the three clubs contended against each other for the honours. The rivalry initially had a communal background since Mohammedan being a Muslim-only club representing the Muslim population of Kolkata, thereby forcing the Hindus in the city to compete via their support for Mohun Bagan and East Bengal even though they were not communal clubs themselves. By the 1960s, communal tension involved in the feud became insignificant as the club began to regularly sign non-Muslim players as well. However, the club also lost their dominance in Indian football and after the inception of national tournaments like Federation Cup and National Football League, Mohammedan was no more a top club and mostly playing in the lower tiers. Thus, the club rarely met Mohun Bagan and East Bengal at major tournaments due to them being in the top tier. Unlike the ever fierce East Bengal-Mohun Bagan feud termed as Kolkata Derby, the matches including Mohammedan and Mohun Bagan or East Bengal is commonly termed as Kolkata Mini Derby.

== Players ==
=== First-team squad ===
As of February 2026

Note: Flags indicate national team as defined under FIFA eligibility rules; some limited exceptions apply. Players may hold more than one non-FIFA nationality.

No.	Pos.	Nation	Player
1	GK	IND	Padam Chettri
3	DF	IND	Pukhrambam Dinesh Meitei
5	MF	IND	Yash Chickro
6	DF	IND	Sajad Hussain Parray
8	MF	IND	Amarjit Singh Kiyam
9	FW	IND	Fardin Ali Molla
10	FW	IND	Lalthankima Khiangte
14	DF	IND	Zodingliana Ralte
17	FW	IND	Thokchom Adison Singh
18	MF	IND	Jeremy Laldinpuia
20	DF	IND	Hira Mondal

No.	Pos.	Nation	Player
21	GK	IND	Shubhadip Pandit
24	DF	IND	Joe Zoherliana
26	DF	IND	Mohammed Jasim
27	FW	IND	Maharabam Maxion
28	GK	IND	Nikhil Deka
29	FW	IND	Lalremsanga Fanai
30	FW	IND	Israfil Dewan
31	GK	IND	Subhajit Bhattacharjee
35	FW	IND	Juwel Ahmed Mazumder
40	MF	IND	Tangva Ragui
43	DF	IND	Joseph Lalmuanawma
52	MF	IND	Mahitosh Roy
99	DF	IND	Lalngaihsaka

=== Out on loan ===
Note: Flags indicate national team as defined under FIFA eligibility rules; some limited exceptions apply. Players may hold more than one non-FIFA nationality.

No.	Pos.	Nation	Player

== Personnel ==
=== Technical staff ===
As of October 2026

Position	Name
Technical director	(Serbia) Dejan Antonić
Head coach	(India) Saheed Ramon
Assistant coach	(India) Sudhir Mishra
Goalkeeping coach	(India) Lalit Thapa
Physio	(India) Soumya Bhattacharjee
Physio	(India) Md. Belal Qureshi
Strength & conditioning coach	(India) Arsalan Mirza
Performance analyst	(India) Devrup J. Gupta
Masseur	(India) Samir Biswas

=== Management ===
As of August 2026

Position	Name
President	(India) Ghazal Uz Zafar
Vice president	(India) Dr. Abhishek Singh and Sajjad Hossain Mullick
General secretary	(India) SK. Wasim Akram
Assistant general secretary	(India) Vacant
Treasurer	(India) Md. Samiduddin
Football secretary	(India) Belal Ahmed Khan
Cricket secretary	(India) Dipak K. Singh

== Previous seasons ==
Only the seasons since the introduction of a national league in 1996 has been stated below.

As of 22 August 2023

Season	National leagues								Regional league	Domestic cup(s)		Other honours
Season	Div	P	W	D	L	GD	Pts	Pos	Regional league	Domestic cup(s)		Other honours
National Football League/NFL 2nd Division									Calcutta Premier Division	Federation Cup		Other honours
1996–97	1st	5	1	0	4	-3	3	5th of 6 (group stage)	5th	Round of 16		Kohima Royal Gold Cup
1997–98	2nd	5	?	?	?	?	?	5th of 6 (group stage)	4th	Quarter-finalist		
1998–99	Relegated to regional league								5th	Semi-finalist		
1999–00	Relegated to regional league								4th	Not held		
2000–01	2nd	4	1	0	3	-2	3	4th of 5 (final stage)	3rd	Not held		
2001–02	Relegated to regional league								6th	Not eligible		
2002–03	2nd	3	2	1	0	2	7	2nd of 4 (final stage)	2nd	Not held		
2003–04	1st	22	4	7	11	-19	19	11th	3rd	Runners-up		
2004–05	2nd	3	2	1	0	3	7	1st of 4 (final stage)	5th	Round of 16		
2005–06	1st	17	5	2	10	-14	17	8th	3rd	Round of 16		
2006–07	1st	18	2	6	10	-25	12	9th	3rd	Quarter-finalist		
I-League/I-League 2nd Division												
2007–08	2nd	5	3	1	1	5	10	2nd of 6 (final stage)	5th	Round of 16		Independence Day Cup
2008–09	1st	22	5	7	10	-14	22	11th	2nd	Group Stage		
2009–10	2nd	7	2	4	1	0	10	4th of 8 (final stage)	?	Group Stage		
2010–11	2nd	7	1	1	5	-5	4	7th of 8 (final stage)	?	Qualifying play-offs		All Airlines Gold Cup
2011–12	2nd	12	6	3	3	4	21	3rd of 7 (final stage)	?	Group Stage		
2012–13	2nd	10	5	3	2	3	18	2nd of 6 (final stage)	6th	Group Stage		Kalinga Cup
2013–14	1st	24	6	6	12	-8	24	13th	3rd	Group Stage		IFA Shield, Durand Cup
2014–15	2nd	14	8	2	4	12	23 (Note: The club was penalized by the deduction of 3 points due to players' contract faults.)	4th	4th			
2015–16	2nd	10	4	3	3	2	12 (Note: 3 points were by the FIFA Disciplinary Committee)	4th of 6 (final stage)	5th	Not eligible		
2016–17	2nd	6	3	1	2	4	10	3rd of 4 (Preliminary stage)	2nd	Not eligible		Sikkim Gold Cup
										Super Cup		
2017–18	2nd	10	3	3	4	-1	12	5th of 6 (Preliminary stage)	3rd	Not eligible		
2018–19	2nd	10	5	1	4	8	16	3rd of 6 (Preliminary stage)	4th	Not eligible		Bordoloi Trophy, Bodoland Gold Cup
										Durand Cup (Note: After the cancellation of Super Cup due to COVID-19 pandemic, Durand Cup became the de facto domestic cup tournament.)		
2019–20	2nd	4	3	1	0	6	10	1st of 5 (final stage)	4th	Group Stage		Sikkim Gold Cup
										Super Cup		
2020–21	1st	15	5	5	5	-2	20	6th of 11	Cancelled (Note: Tournament was cancelled due to COVID-19 pandemic.)	Cancelled		
2021–22	1st	18	11	4	3	16	37	2nd of 10	Champion (Note: Tournament format was changed from league to league-cum-knockout.)	Not held		
										Durand Cup (Note: Both Durand Cup as well as Super Cup became the domestic cup tournaments of India from 2022)	Super Cup	
2022–23	2nd (Note: The I-League was demoted to the second tier starting from the 2022–23 season, the ISL becoming the sole top-tier league.)	22	7	5	10	-1	26	8th of 12	Champion	Semi-finalist	Qualifying rounds	
2023–24	2nd	24	15	7	2	24	52	1st of 13	Champion	Group Stage	Group Stage	
Indian Super League												
2024–25	13th	24	2	7	15	-31	13	13th of 13	6th	Group Stage	Round of 16	

== Managerial history ==
Note: The following list may not be complete

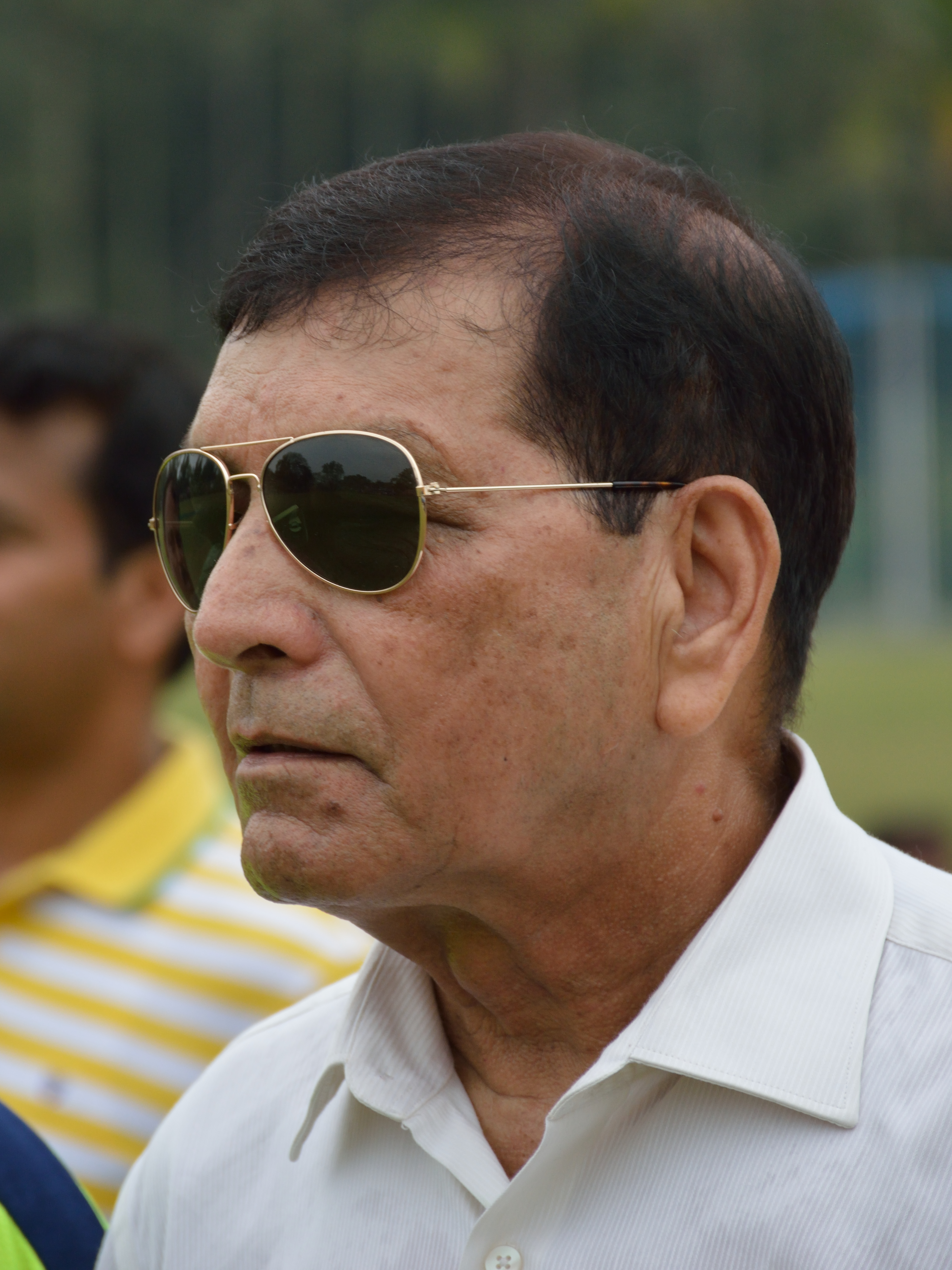
Dronacharya awardee Syed Nayeemuddin played and later managed Mohammedan Sporting.

Andrey Chernyshov secured the CFL title for Mohammedan Sporting twice.

- (India) Syed Nayeemuddin (1982–1985)
- (India) Shabbir Ali (1985–1992)
- (India) Sudip Chatterjee (1997)
- (India) Mridul Banerjee (1997–1998)
- (India) Pungam Kannan (1998–1999)
- (India) Mohammed Habib (1999–2000)
- (India) Syed Firoze (2000–2001)
- (India) Chandu Roy Chowdhury (2001)
- (Nigeria) Chibuzor Nwakanma (2001–2002)
- (India) Mohammed Habib (2002–2003)
- (India) Shankar Maitra (2003)
- (India) P. K. Banerjee (2003–2004)
- (Iran) Jamshid Nassiri (2004)
- (India) Mohammed Habib (2005)
- (India) Subhash Bhowmick (2005–2006)
- (India) Shabbir Ali (2007–2010)
- (Nigeria) Ayodeji Fuja Tope (2010–2011)
- (India) Syed Nayeemuddin (2011)
- (India) Aloke Mukherjee (2011–2013)
- (Nigeria) Abdul Aziz Moshood (2013)
- (India) Sanjoy Sen (2013–2014)
- (India) Mridul Banerjee (2014–2015)
- (India) Ananta Kumar Ghosh (2015–2016)
- (India) Ranjan Chowdhury (2017–2018)
- (India) Biswajit Bhattacharya (2017–2018)
- (India) Raghunath Nandi (2018–2019)
- (India) Subrata Bhattacharya (2019)
- (Nigeria) Saheed Ramon (2019)
- (India) Yan Law (2020)
- (Spain) José Carlos Hevia (2020–2021)
- (India) Sankarlal Chakraborty (2021)
- (Russia) Andrey Chernyshov (2021–2022)
- (Spain) Kibu Vicuña (2022–2023)
- (India) Mehrajuddin Wadoo (2023)
- (Russia) Andrey Chernyshov (2023–2025)

== Notable players ==
=== Past and present internationals ===
The players below have/had senior international cap(s) for their respective countries. Players whose name is listed, represented their countries before or after playing for Mohammedan SC.

=== Asia ===
- (Pakistan) Osman Jan (1935–1939)
- (Pakistan) Wajeed Ali Miazi (1945–1946)
- (Pakistan) Sheikh Shaheb Ali (1945)
- (Pakistan) Ghulam Muhammad (1950s)
- (Pakistan) Dad Muhammad (1950s)
- (Pakistan) Fazalur Rehman (1949; 1951–1954)
- (Pakistan) Masood Fakhri (1955–1956)
- (Pakistan) Amir Jang Ghaznavi (1957)
- (Pakistan) Muhammad Umer (1956–1960)
- (Pakistan) Abid Hussain Ghazi (1956–??)
- (Pakistan) Moosa Ghazi (1959–1961)
- (Pakistan) Abdul Ghafoor Majna (1960)
- (Iran) Ahmad Sanjari (1978)
- (Iran) Majid Bishkar (1982–1987) (Note: Majid Bishkar is one of the only two foreigners to play for Mohammedan, appeared in the 1978 FIFA World Cup.)
- (Nepal) Mani Shah (1987–1989)
- (Bangladesh) Mahabub Hossain Roksy (1991)
- (Bangladesh) Kaiser Hamid (1991)
- (Bangladesh) Nurul Haque Manik (1991)
- (Bangladesh) Rumman Bin Wali Sabbir (1991)
- (Bangladesh) Mohammed Ponir (1991)
- (Bangladesh) SM Salahuddin (1991)
- (Bangladesh) Mohammed Jewel Rana (1991)
- (Bangladesh) Sayeed Hassan Kanan (1991)
- (Bangladesh) Rezaul Karim Rehan (1991)
- (Bangladesh) Imtiaz Sultan Johnny (1991)
- (Nepal) Devnarayan Chaudhury (2000–2001)
- (Nepal) Sandip Rai (2010–2011)
- (Syria) Wael Ayan (2018)
- (Nepal) Shyam Babu Kyapchhali (2019–2020)
- (Nepal) Abhishek Rijal (2020)
- (Bangladesh) Jamal Bhuyan (2020–2021)
- (Tajikistan) Nuriddin Davronov (2022)
- (Kyrgyzstan) Mirlan Murzayev (2022–2023)

=== Africa ===
- (Nigeria) Emeka Ezeugo (1989–90) (Note: Emeka Ezeugo is one of the only two foreigners to play for Mohammedan, who appeared in the 1994 FIFA World Cup.)
- (Kenya) Moses Owira (1998–1999, 2001)
- (Liberia) Eugene Gray (2002–2003, 2009)
- (Zimbabwe) David Makandawire (2005–2007, 2009–2011)
- (Liberia) Preston Corporal (2006–2007)
- (Sudan) (South Sudan) James Moga (2016)
- (Ethiopia) Fikru Teferra (2018)
- (Uganda) Musa Mudde (2019–2020)
- (Uganda) Henry Kisekka (2022)
- (Ghana) Prince Opoku Agyemang (2023)
- (Democratic Republic of the Congo) (Central African Republic) César Lobi Manzoki (2024–)

=== North America ===
- (Trinidad and Tobago) Willis Plaza (2018, 2020)
- (Trinidad and Tobago) Marcus Joseph (2021–2023)
- (Honduras) Eddie Hernández (2023–2024)

== Honours ==
=== International ===
- Aga Khan Gold Cup (Note: The competition is widely regarded as the predecessor of AFC Champions League (held for the first time in 1967), since it was the first organized international competition that involved club teams around Asia, organized by the football authorities of East Pakistan, in collaboration with Asian Football Confederation (AFC).)
  - Winners (1): 1960

=== Domestic ===
League

- I-League
  - Champions (1): 2023–24
  - Runners-up (1): 2021–22
- NFL 2nd Division
  - Champions (1): 2004–05
  - Runners-up (1): 2002–03
- I-League 2nd Division/I-League Qualifiers (Note: I-League 2nd Division was replaced by a shorter cup tournament, I-League Qualifiers, due to COVID-19 pandemic regulations.)
  - Champions (1): 2019–20
  - Runners-up (2): 2008, 2013
  - Third place (1): 2012
- Calcutta Football League
  - Champions (14): 1934, 1935, 1936, 1937, 1938, 1940, 1941, 1948, 1957, 1967, 1981, 2021, 2022, 2023
  - Runners-up (9): 1942, 1944, 1949, 1960, 1971, 1992, 2002, 2008, 2016–17

Cup

- Federation Cup
  - Winners (2): 1983–84, 1984–85
  - Runners-up (3): 1981–82, 1989–90, 2003
- Durand Cup
  - Champions (2): 1940, 2013
  - Runners-up (4): 1959, 1980, 1992, 2021
- IFA Shield (Note: Fourth oldest football tournament, organized by the IFA (W.B.), and played between the local clubs of West Bengal and other invited ones.)
  - Champions (6): 1936, 1941, 1942, 1957, 1971, 2014
  - Runners-up (4): 1938, 1963, 1982, 1990
- Rovers Cup
  - Champions (6): 1940, 1956, 1959, 1980, 1984, 1987
  - Runners-up (9): 1937, 1941, 1955, 1957, 1958, 1981, 1982, 1983, 1991
- Bordoloi Trophy
  - Champions (6): 1969, 1970, 1985, 1986, 1991, 2018
  - Runners-up (5): 1965, 1966, 1971, 1977, 1983
- DCM Trophy
  - Champions (4): 1958, 1961, 1964, 1980
  - Runners-up (3): 1960, 1982, 1983
- All Airlines Gold Cup
  - Champions (3): 1986, 1996, 2010
  - Runners-up (7): 1987, 1988, 1989, 1990, 2005, 2011, 2012
- Cooch Behar Cup
  - Champions (5): 1902, 1906, 1909, 1947, 1952
- Sait Nagjee Trophy
  - Champions (4): 1971, 1984, 1991, 1992
  - Runners-up (1): 1979
- Independence Day Cup
  - Champions (6): 1969, 1971, 1972, 1988, 2007, 2009
  - Runners-up (1): 2018
- Sikkim Governor's Gold Cup
  - Champions (3): 1980, 2016, 2019
  - Runners-up (4): 1986, 1987, 1989, 1991
- Kalinga Cup
  - Champions (3): 1964, 1991, 2012
- Darjeeling Gold Cup
  - Champions (1): 1984
  - Runners-up (1): 2018
- Stafford Challenge Cup
  - Champions (4): 1968, 1970, 1981, 1991
- Bodoland Martyrs Gold Cup
  - Champions (2): 2004, 2018
- Du Mont Morency Cup
  - Winners (1): 1939
- Nizam Gold Cup
  - Champions (1): 1983
- Vizag Trophy
  - Champions (1): 1986
- Kohima Royal Gold Cup
  - Runners-up (1): 1996
- Amta Sanghati Gold Cup
  - Runners-up (1): 2015
- Sri Krishna Gold Cup
  - Champions (4): 1958, 1959, 1965, 1966
- Narayana Trophy
  - Champions (1): 1971
- Steel Express Cup
  - Champions (3): 2001, 2011, 2018
- All India Sambalpur Gold Cup
  - Champions (2): 2009, 2011
- Charms Cup
  - Runners-up (1): 1994
- Nehru Centenary Club Cup
  - Semi-finals (1): 1990

=== Youth ===
- Youth League U13
  - Runners-up (1): 2017–18

=== Awards ===
- Banga Bibhushan: 2022

== Club records ==
=== Overall records ===
- First team to win the Calcutta Football League five years in a row, from 1934 to 1938
- Only team to win the Calcutta League in the very first year of its promotion
- First Indian team to win the Durand Cup, in which they defeated Royal Warwickshire Regiment 2–1 (7 December 1940)
- First Indian team to win the Rovers Cup in 1940
- First Indian team to win a trophy overseas, Aga Khan Gold Cup in Dhaka 1960, beating Indonesian side PSM Makassar 4–1

=== Notable wins against foreign teams ===
As of matches played 1 April 2018

Competition	Round	Year	Opposition	Score	Venue	City	Ref
Durand Cup	Final	1940	(United Kingdom) Royal Warwickshire Regiment	2–1	Irwin Amphitheatre	New Delhi	
IFA Shield	Final	1941	(United Kingdom) King's Own Scottish Borderers	2–0	Eden Gardens	Calcutta	
Aga Khan Gold Cup	Final	1960	(Indonesia) PSM Makassar	4–1	Dacca National Stadium	Dhaka	
DCM Trophy	Final	1980	(South Korea) Seoul Trust Bank	1–0	Ambedkar Stadium	New Delhi	
DCM Trophy	Group stage	1982	(Australia) East Fremantle Tricolore	1–0	Ambedkar Stadium	New Delhi	
DCM Trophy	Group stage	1982	Pakistan International Airlines	5–1	Ambedkar Stadium	New Delhi	
DCM Trophy	Group stage	1983	(Bangladesh) Dhaka Abahani	1–0	Ambedkar Stadium	New Delhi	
DCM Trophy	Semi-final	1983	(South Korea) Myongji University	1–1 (3–0 p)	Ambedkar Stadium	New Delhi	
Nehru Centenary Club Cup	Group Stage	1990	Zambia MNT	1–0	Vivekananda Yuba Bharati Krirangan	Kolkata	
Nehru Centenary Club Cup	Group Stage	1990	(Ukraine) Metalist 1925 Kharkiv	1–0	Vivekananda Yuba Bharati Krirangan	Kolkata	
DCM Trophy	Group stage	1991	Nepal Airlines Club	3–0	Ambedkar Stadium	New Delhi	
IFA Shield	Group Stage	2004	(Bangladesh) Muktijoddha Sangsad KC	3–1	Vivekananda Yuba Bharati Krirangan	Kolkata	
IFA Shield	Group Stage	2011	(China) Shandong Luneng Taishan	1–0	Vivekananda Yuba Bharati Krirangan	Kolkata	
IFA Shield	Final	2014	(Bangladesh) Sheikh Jamal Dhanmondi	1–1 (4–3 p)	Vivekananda Yuba Bharati Krirangan	Kolkata	
Sikkim Gold Cup	Final	2016	(Nepal) Jhapa XI	1–0	Paljor Stadium	Gangtok	

== Gallery ==
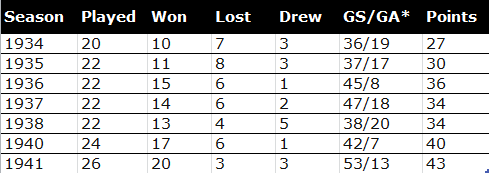
Performance stats of Mohammedan in CFL from 1934 to 1941

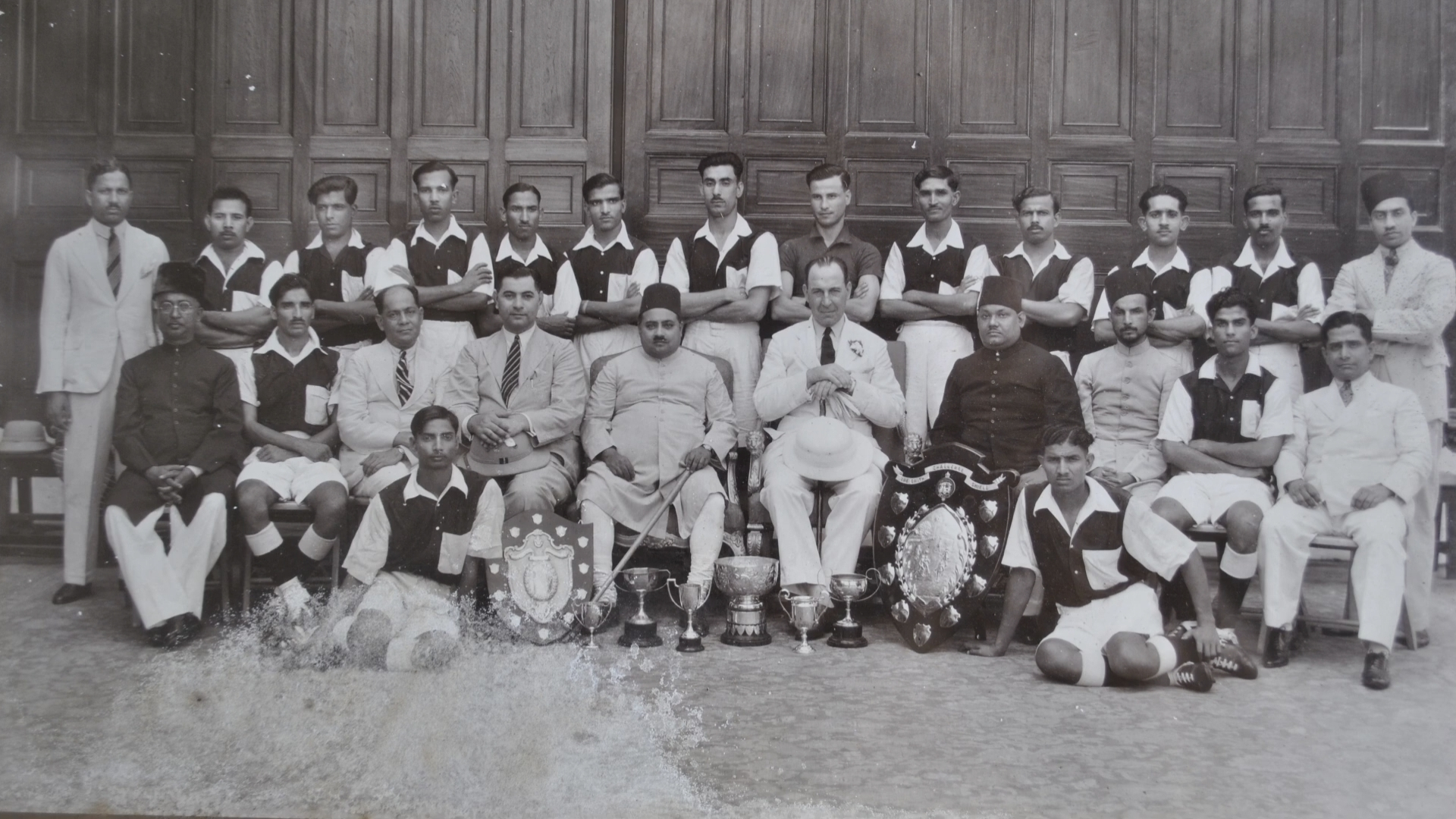
Kolkata Mohammedan in 1935

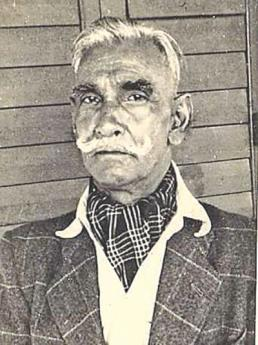
Football Jadukor (transl. Football Magician) Syed Abdus Samad played for Mohammedan from 1933 to 1938, and was CFL champion five years in a row.

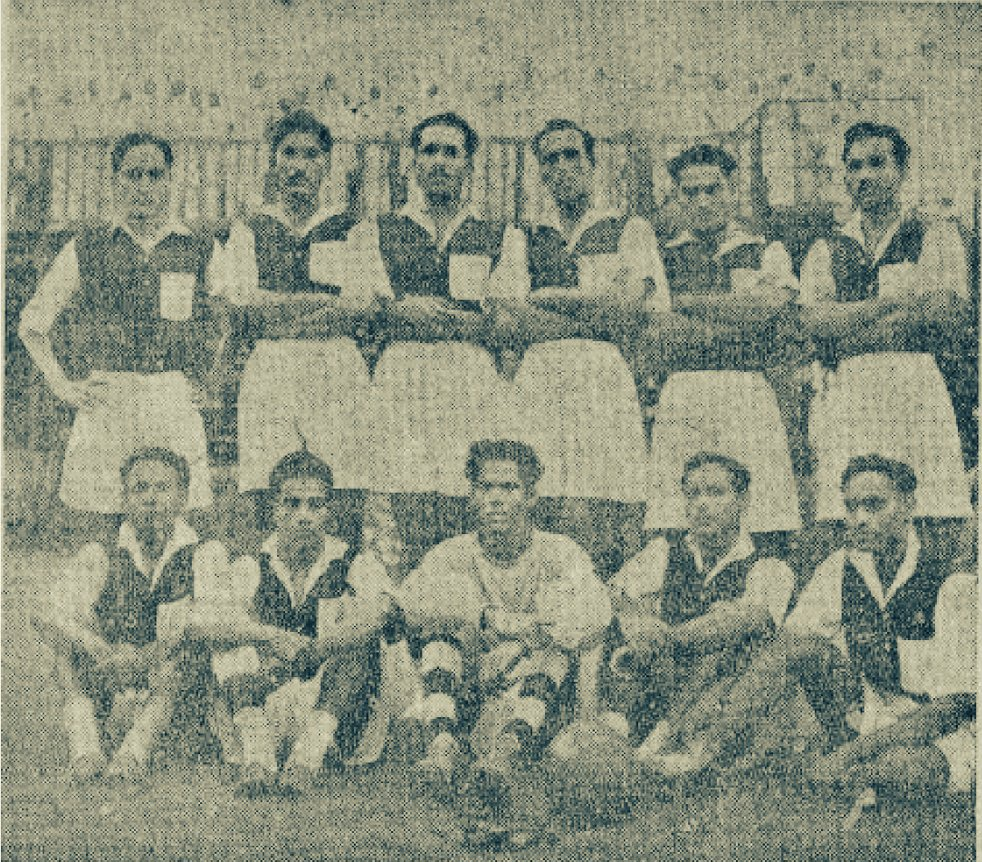
The Mohammedan Sporting team in 1948.

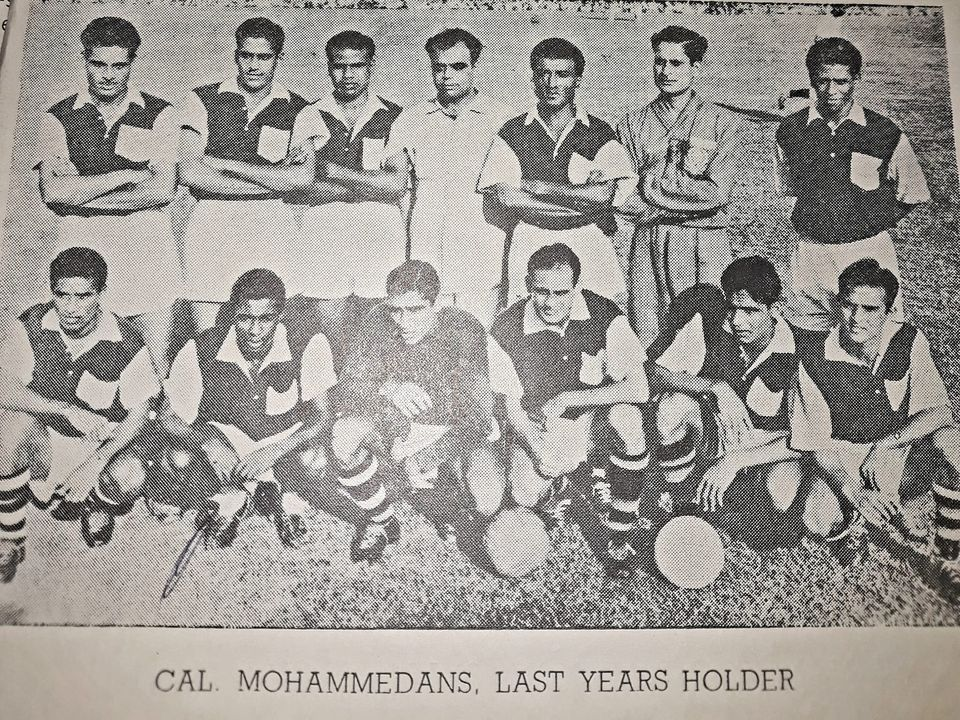
1960 Aga Khan Gold Cup winners Kolkata Mohammedan, pictured before the final

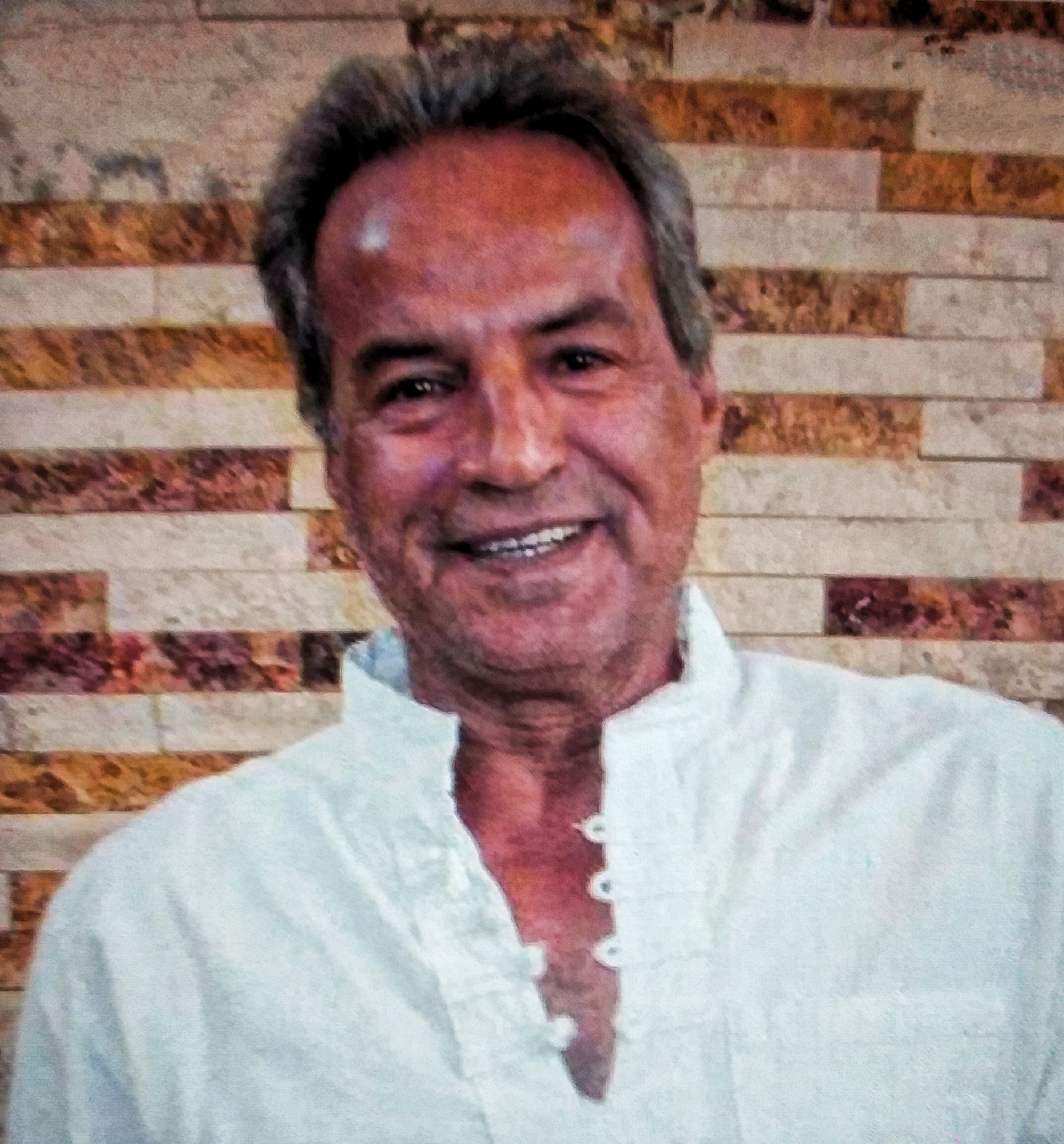
Majid Bishkar played for Mohammedan from 1982 to 1987.

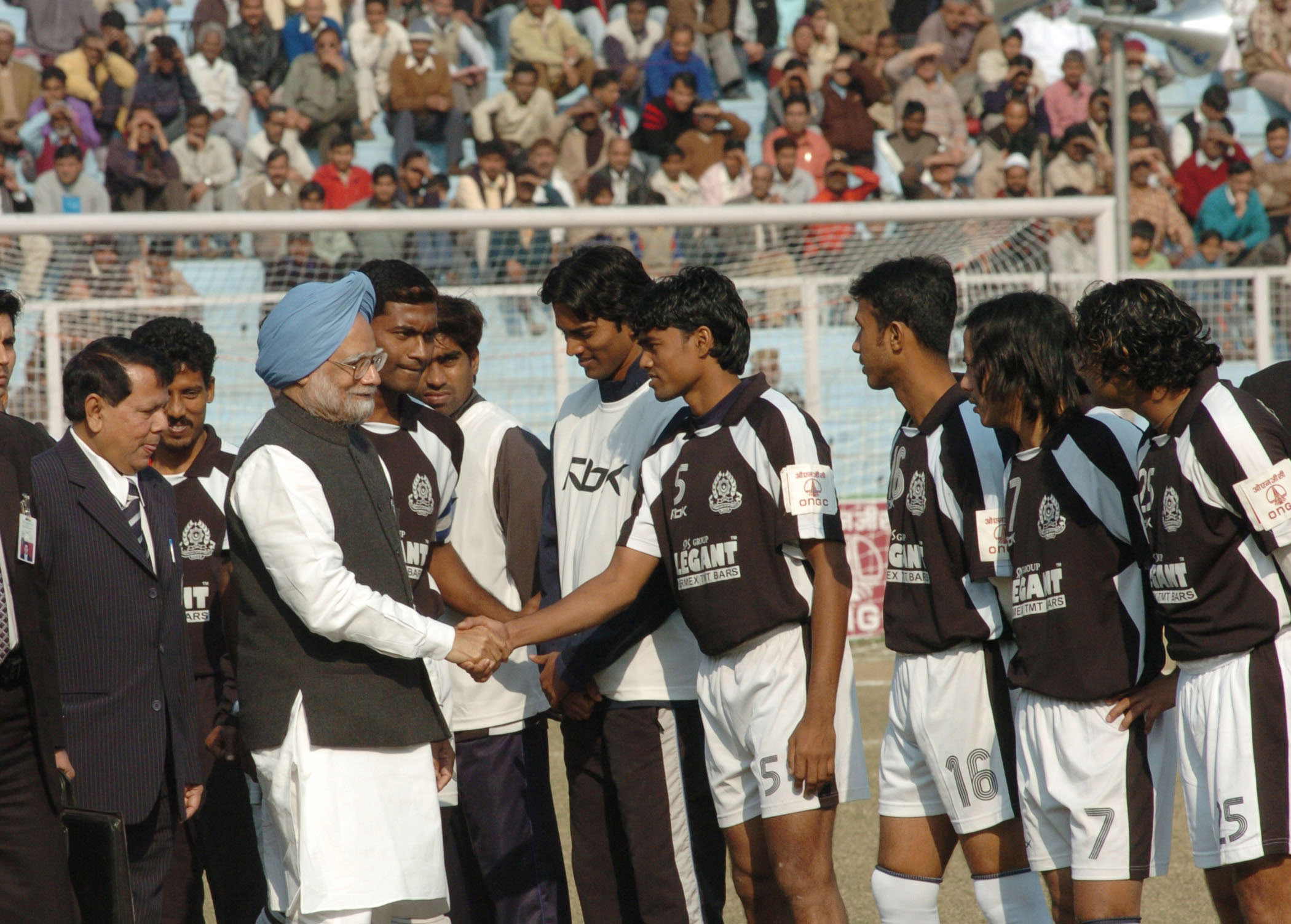
Prime Minister Manmohan Singh being introduced with the Mohammedan players, during the inauguration of the 2006–07 NFL on January 5, 2007

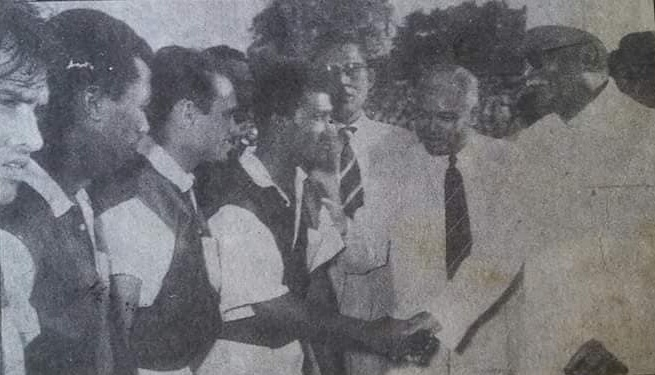
Rajendra Prasad meeting with Kolkata Mohammedan players

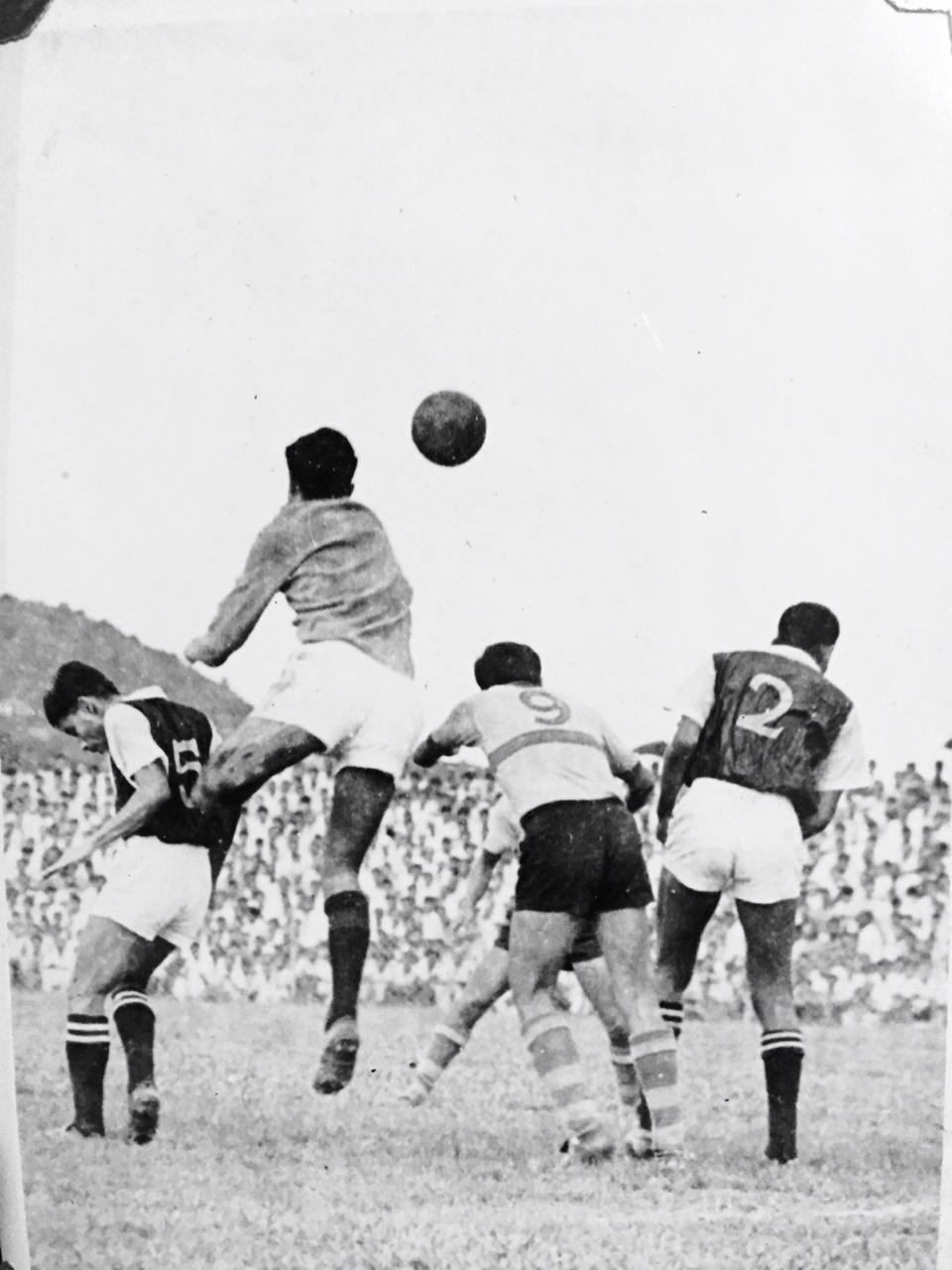
Mohammedan goalkeeper Shakeel Ahmed jumping up for clearing the ball during a match

== Other departments ==
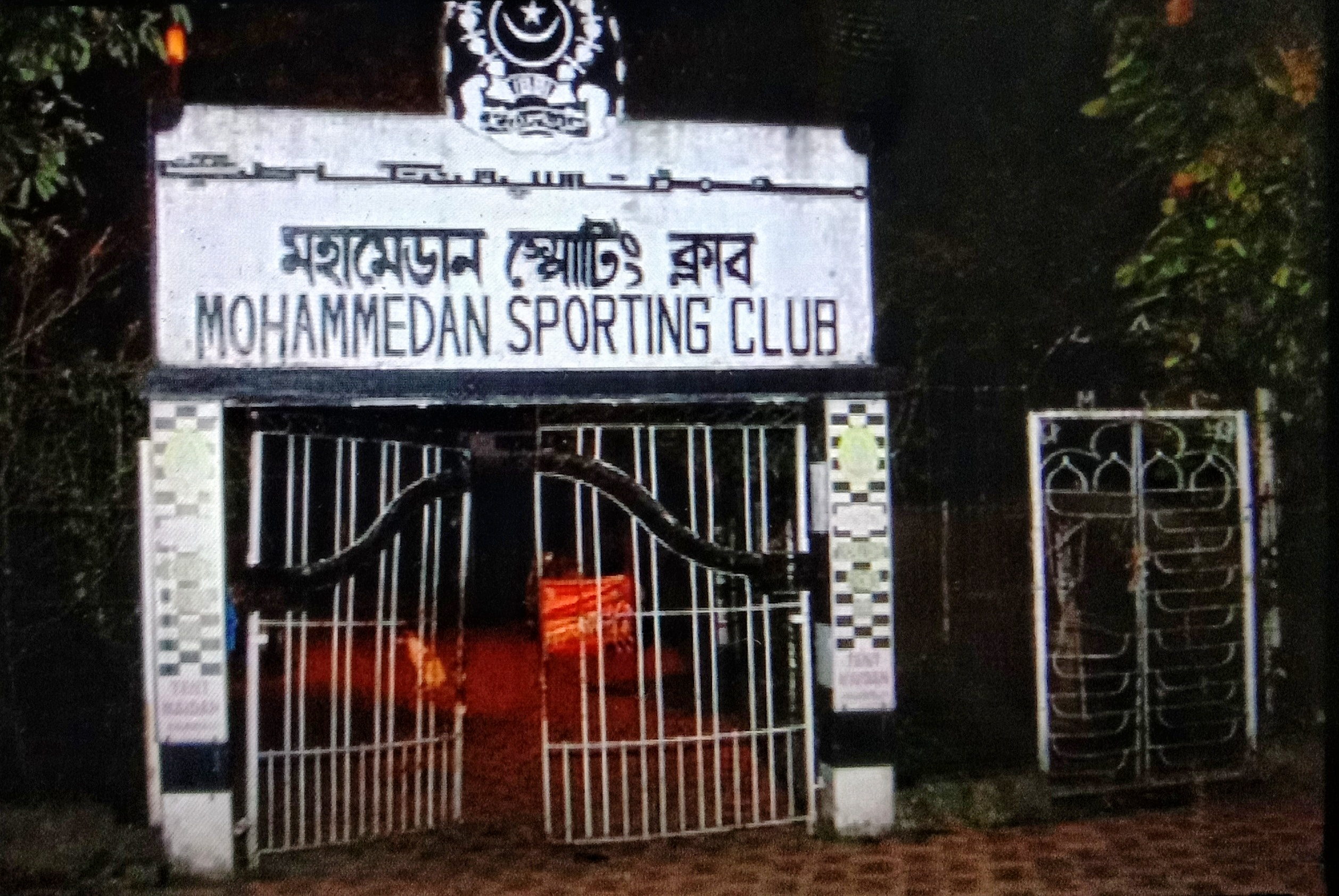
Main entrance of the Mohammedan SC club tent at evening

=== Women's football ===
Mohammedan Sporting women's football section was instituted for the first time in 2022 and participated in the 2022–23 Calcutta Women's Football League. They went past the group stage and qualified for the knockouts, where they finished as semi-finalists in their inaugural season before losing to the eventual winners East Bengal.

=== Cricket ===
The cricket section of Mohammedan Sporting is headquartered at the Tent Maidan, and they practice at both Kolkata Maidan fields and Mohammedan Sporting Ground. The men's cricket team primarily competes in the Cricket Association of Bengal (CAB) First Division tournament, and also participate in JC Mukherjee T-20 Trophy, A. N. Ghosh Memorial Trophy, CAB One Day League and P. Sen Trophy.

The women's cricket team of Mohammedan participates in the CAB run Bengal Women's T20 League. On 24 February 2022, they emerged champions in the league, defeating Rajasthan Club at Kalyani Stadium. They also achieved the feat again in May 2025.

=== Futsal ===
Mohammedan SC participates in Futsal Club Championship, highest level of club futsal competition in India. It is currently the only club from West Bengal to participate in the competition.

=== Athletics ===
The club has an athletics divisions for numerous track and field sports and the athletes represent the club in the annual athletics meet hosted all across the state, including the ones hosted by the neighbouring sports club like Mohun Bagan and East Bengal.

=== Field hockey ===
Club's hockey team is affiliated with Hockey Bengal. Since the British rule in India, the club participated in prestigious tournaments like Beighton Cup and Calcutta Hockey League. Mohammedan won the 1945 and 1959 editions of Calcutta Hockey League. They also achieved runner-up position in Beighton Cup thrice in 1945, 1957 and 1981. The hockey section was revived in 2024 for the edition of Calcutta Hockey League.

== Legacy ==
Mohammedan Sporting Club is not just a football club, it is also a symbol of national integrity and an example of the communal harmony.

— Ghazal uz Zafar, general secretary of Mohammedan SC, on the club's role in Indian football (celebrating the 126th foundation day on 22 February 2017).

The name of noted Bangladeshi club based in Dhaka – Mohammedan Sporting Club — is derived from Mohammedan Sporting Club of Kolkata; The club also adopted a similar crest. Members of the Nawab family of Dhaka established Muslim Sports Club as a local club for the youth. A few years later, the family renamed the club as Mohammedan Sporting Club, inspired by the historic Mohammedan Sporting of Kolkata.

=== Club award ===
Shaan-e-Mohammedan (transl. 'Pride of Mohammedan') is the lifetime achievement award presented by the club annually since 2015, to respect and laud footballing personalities for their indispensable contribution to the club during their career. The award is usually presented either on the foundation day of the club or on the occasion of Iftar when the club organises Dawat-e-Iftar (transl. Iftar Dinner) for the current and former players and coaches along with other distinct personalities.

Shaan-e-Mohammedan recipients
Year	Name	Ref
2015	Mohammad Akbar	
2016	Prasun Banerjee	
2017	Syed Lateefuddin	
2018	Manas Bhattacharya	
2019	Victor Amalraj	
2020	Not awarded due to pandemic	
2021	Not awarded due to pandemic	
2022	Syed Nayeemuddin	
2023	Bhaskar Ganguly	

== See also ==
- Football in Kolkata
- List of football clubs in India
- List of football clubs in West Bengal
- History of Indian football – Overview of the history of association football in India
- Indian football clubs in Asian competitions
