= Moideen Kutty =

Pakistani footballer (1928–2011)

Moideen Kutty PP
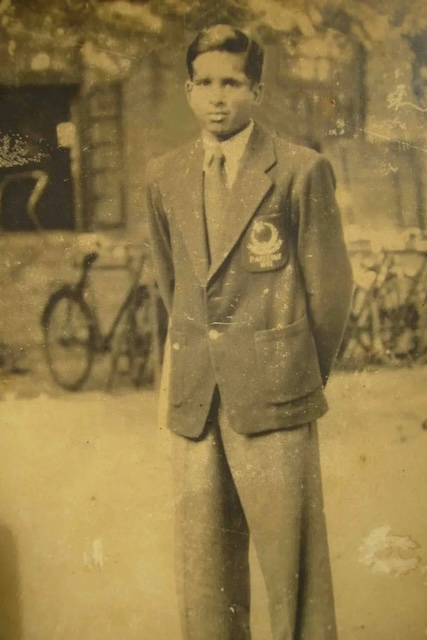
- Kutty in Pakistan national team blazers

Personal information
- Date of birth: 2 January 1926
- Place of birth: Malappuram, Madras Presidency, British India
- Date of death: 20 December 2005 (aged 79) or 7 September 2011 (aged 85)
- Place of death: Karachi, Pakistan
- Position: Striker

Senior career*
Years	Team	Apps	(Gls)
–1947	Royal Indian Air Force		
1947–1950s	Pakistan Air Force		

International career
1952–1955	Pakistan	9+	(5)

Managerial career
- 1965: Pakistan Youth
- * Club domestic league appearances and goals

Flt/Sgt. Moideen Kutty PP (born 2 January 1926), or Mohiuddin Kutty, was a Pakistani footballer who played as a striker. Considered as one of the earliest pioneering footballers in Pakistan history, he was the fourth captain of the Pakistan national football team after Osman Jan, Abdul Wahid Durrani and Muhammad Sharif.

Born in the Madras Presidency of British India, he rose through the ranks from school football. After enlisting in the Royal Indian Air Force in 1944, he represented the Royal Indian Air Force football team. Following the partition of India, Kutty moved to Pakistan where he captained the Pakistan Air Force team. He also represented the Pakistan Army football team.

Kutty scored on his debut with the Pakistan national team at the 1952 Asian Quadrangular Football Tournament, where he helped the side finish as joint-winners alongside India. He later captained the national team at the 1954 Asian Games.

In recognition of his contributions to sports, Kutty was honored with the Pride of Performance Award by the Government of Pakistan in 1969.

== Early life ==
Kutty was born in Melmuri, Malappuram, in the Madras Presidency of British India on 2 January 1926.

Nicknamed as "Irumban" (lit. 'Iron man') due to his lethal barefoot finishing, he developed an interest in football while attending the model high school in Malappuram, where he also guided the team to victories in inter-school competitions. Following his matriculation, he enlisted in the Royal Indian Air Force in 1944. Experiencing his inaugural moments of playing football with boots during his training in Bangalore, he became an essential component of the Royal Indian Air Force football squad.

== Club career ==
=== Early years ===
In 1947, during the Partition of British India, Kutty was serving in the Royal Indian Air Force, where the majority of his colleagues hailed from the western Punjab Province, which eventually became part of Pakistan after the independence. Consequently, he opted for Pakistan in order to remain alongside his teammates and continue his football journey. His decision was made without a full understanding of the broader ramifications of the Partition, as he held the belief that India and Pakistan would maintain friendly relations and that travel between the two nations would be seamless.

“He believed India and Pakistan would be two friendly countries and cross-border movements would be smooth. It was only later he realised that he was awfully wrong and these two countries were likely to stay hostile to each other for the conceivable time.”

— Moideen's cousin-in-law Ahmed Kutty to The Indian Express

Consequently, Kutty became a part of the Royal Pakistan Air Force, which emerged following the partition of the British Indian military forces. He continued his football involvement in his new homeland.

=== Pakistan ===
In 1950, Kutty was chosen to be a part of the Pakistan Air Force football team, assuming the role of captain for the PAF team during the 1951 All-Pakistan Inter-Services Football Championship.

In 1951, Kutty appeared as a guest player for the Wagga City Wanderers, notably, scoring the winning goal against Canberra to win a trophy.

He also participated in the 1955 Army Football Tournament that took place in Iran, which showcased army football teams from India, Iran, Turkey, Iraq, and Syria. The Pakistan Combined Services football team achieved victories against India and Iran, secured a draw against Syria and Iraq, but faced a loss to Turkey. Overall, they finished in the third position behind the Turkish and Iranian teams in the Army Tournament.

During Iran Services team tour of Pakistan in March 1956, Kutty represented a Pakistan Combined Services team in a match against Iran. After the Iranian team secured a 2–1 victory over Karachi at the YMCA Ground in Karachi, the Combined Services team managed to turn the tables by defeating the visitors 2–1 in the subsequent game, avenging Karachi's earlier loss.

== International career ==
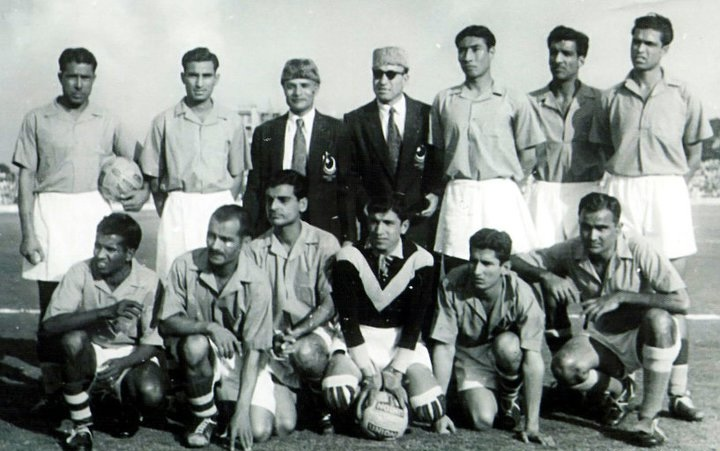
Kutty in the bottom left with the Pakistan national team in 1955

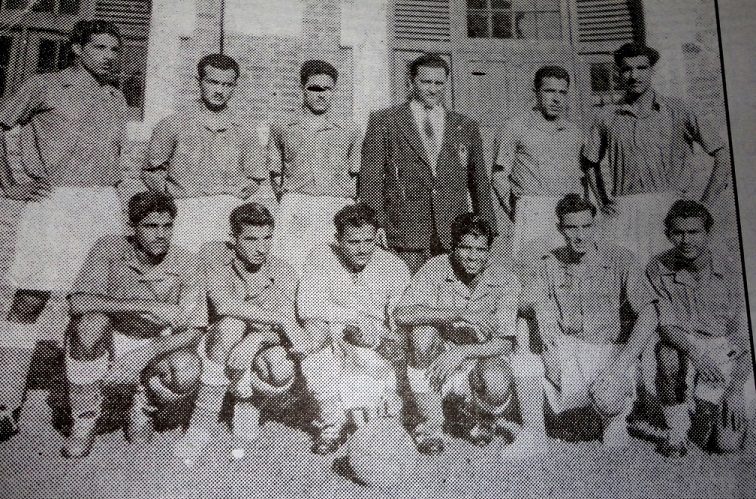
Kutty with the Pakistan national team in 1953 (third from right to left)

In 1952, Kutty was selected for the Pakistan national team, and made his debut during the 1952 Asian Quadrangular Football Tournament. In his debut match, Kutty scored against the host team, Ceylon, making a notable debut. Pakistan played its first match against India after victories over Ceylon and Burma, which ended in a goalless draw and emerged as joint winners of the tournament after finishing with the same points in the table.

In the subsequent edition of the tournament held in Burma in 1953, he scored two goals against Ceylon in Pakistan's resounding 6–0 victory.

In a preparation match for the Asian Games in 1954, he scored against a Singapore combined Colony XI in a 4–1 victory on 24 April 1954. He was appointed captain of the Pakistan team for the 1954 Asian Games in Manila, where he made a significant impact by scoring a goal and providing an assist in Pakistan's 6–2 victory over Singapore. Kutty would then represent the national team at the 1955 Asian Quadrangular Football Tournament held at Dacca, East Pakistan.

== Coaching career ==
Following his playing career, Moideen Kutty transitioned into coaching roles. In 1956, he took on the position of coach for both the Pakistan Services and Air Force teams. Subsequently, he briefly assisted the Pakistan senior team coaching staff. His coaching journey extended to mentoring various youth teams for a span of over 12 years. He was selected head coach of the Pakistan national youth team for their tour to the Soviet Union in August 1965, where the team played several test matches against local clubs. He also had reportedly received coaching education from Loughborough College in the United Kingdom.

== Personal life ==
Kutty also served as flight sergeant in the Pakistan Armed Forces. In recognition of his significant contributions to sports, Moideen Kutty was honored with the Pride of Performance Award, a prestigious civilian accolade in Pakistan. He received this recognition from President Yahya Khan in the year 1969.

Despite facing numerous procedural challenges, Kutty managed to make visits to Malappuram during the 1980s and 90s to see his mother and brothers.

Moideen's spouse, Sainaba, who died in 1987, also originated from Malappuram. The couple had a total of two sons and three daughters, and together, they resided in Karachi.

== Death ==
Kutty died in Karachi. There is no exact consensus on his date of death. Some sources state his death took place on 20 December 2005, while others point to 7 September 2011.

== Career statistics ==
=== International goals ===
Scores and results list Pakistan's goal tally first, score column indicates score after each Kutty goal.

List of international goals scored by Moideen Kutty
No.	Date	Venue	Opponent	Score	Result	Competition	Ref.
1	18 March 1952	Colombo Oval, Colombo, Ceylon	Ceylon		2–0	1952 Asian Quadrangular Football Tournament	
2	2 November 1953	Aung Sag Stadium, Rangoon, Burma	Ceylon	5–0	6–0	1953 Asian Quadrangular Football Tournament	
3	2 November 1953	Aung Sag Stadium, Rangoon, Burma	Ceylon	6–0	6–0	1953 Asian Quadrangular Football Tournament	
4	3 November 1953	Aung Sag Stadium, Rangoon, Burma	India	1–0	1–0	Friendly	
5	2 May 1954	Rizal Memorial Stadium, Manila, Philippines	Singapore	6–2	6–2	1954 Asian Games	

== Honours ==
Pakistan

- Asian Quadrangular Football Tournament:
  - 1952 – Winners
  - 1955 – Runners-up
  - 1954 – Third place

Individual

- Pride of Performance: 1969

== See also ==
- List of Pakistan national football team captains
