= Sumbal Khan =

Pakistani footballer

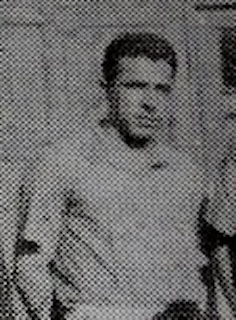
- Khan in 1953

Personal information
- Date of birth: 1926
- Place of birth: Peshawar, British India
- Date of death: December 2007 (aged 81)
- Place of death: Peshawar, Pakistan
- Position: Centre-half

Senior career*
| Years | Team | Apps | (Gls) |
| 1940s–1960s | Warsak | | |
| 1955 | East Bengal | | |

International career
| 1952–1956 | Pakistan | | |
- * Club domestic league appearances and goals

Sumbal Khan (Urdu, Pashto: سنبل خان; 1926 – December 2007) was a Pakistani footballer who played as a centre-half. He was the sixth captain in the history of the Pakistan national football team after Osman Jan, Abdul Wahid Durrani, Muhammad Sharif, Moideen Kutty and Jamil Akhtar. Khan also played for East Bengal in India.

== Early life ==
Khan hailed from Peshawar in the North West Frontier Province in British India.

== Club career ==
Khan starting his career at Peshawar club Warsak FC. He was member of the team till the late 60s. He was among the players who played in the inaugural National Football Championship of Pakistan at YMCA Ground in Karachi in 1948, representing the NWFP provincial team throughout his ensuing career. He also played for the Zamindar Club of Peshawar.

In 1955, Khan alongside fellow national Abdul Haq, joined East Bengal club of India.

== International career ==
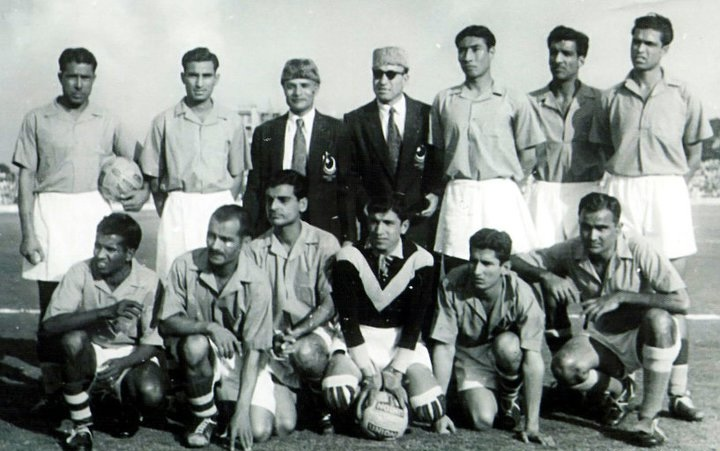
Khan with the Pakistan national team in 1955 (standing at far left)

Sumbal first represented Pakistan in the 1952 Asian Quadrangular Football Tournament in Ceylon. He later featured in the 1953 edition in Burma and the 1954 Asian Games in the Philippines. Sumbal became the sixth captain in the history of the Pakistan national football team at the 1955 Asian Quadrangular Football Tournament at Dhaka. He also toured Ceylon, Singapore and China with the national team in 1956.

== Personal life ==
Khan died in December 2007. The Sumbal Khan Football Ground in Peshawar was named after him.

== Honours ==
Pakistan

- Asian Quadrangular Football Tournament:
  - Winners: 1952
  - Runners-up: 1955
  - Third place: 1954

== See also ==
- List of Pakistan national football team captains
- List of foreign players for SC East Bengal
