= Abdul Ghani (footballer) =

Pakistani former footballer

Personal information
- Full name: Abdul Ghani
- Date of birth: Unknown
- Place of birth: Karachi, British India
- Date of death: Unknown
- Positions: Forward; winger

Senior career*
Years	Team	Apps	(Gls)
1950s	Keamari Union		

International career
1952	Pakistan	3	(0)
- * Club domestic league appearances and goals

Abdul Ghani, (Urdu: عبدالغنی;) was a former Pakistani footballer, who played as a forward, Ghani also represented Pakistan in 1952.

== Club career ==
Ghani played for the Keamari Union Club at domestic level, helping them earn a runners-up position at the 1954 Rovers Cup, with Ghani reducing the margin in the final.

Ghani also represented the Karachi football team at the National Football Championship in the 1950s.

== International career ==
In 1952, Ghani was selected to play for the Pakistan national team, for their participation in the 1952 Asian Quadrangular Football Tournament. Where he made appearances against Burma and India. He also scored a hat-trick, and assisted a goal in a 11–1 victory for Pakistan against a Badulla XI.

The same year, Ghani made an appearance in a friendly against Iran, which resulted in a 0–0 draw.

== Honours ==
=== Pakistan ===
- Asian Quadrangular Football Tournament:
  - Winners (1): 1952 (joint)

=== Keamari Union ===
- Rovers Cup:
  - Runners-up (1): 1954
