= List of Pakistan national football team captains =

This article lists all the captains of the Pakistan national football team.

The first captain to lead Pakistan on their international debut in October 1950 was the goalkeeper Osman Jan, who captained Pakistan in their first international match against Iran on 27 October 1950. The following table includes players who have captained the Pakistan national football team, along with the vice-captains and the international tournaments they led in.

== List of captains ==
Tenure	Incumbent	Vice-captains	Tournaments/Notes	Ref
1950	Osman Jan		1950 tour to Iran and Iraq	
1952	Abdul Wahid Durrani	Muhammad Ramzan Jr.	1952 Asian Quadrangular Football Tournament	
1953	Muhammad Sharif	Moideen Kutty	1953 Asian Quadrangular Football Tournament	
1954	Moideen Kutty	Ahmed Ali Phullo	1954 Asian Games	
1954	Jamil Akhtar	Moideen Kutty	1954 Asian Quadrangular Football Tournament	
1955	Sumbal Khan		1955 Asian Quadrangular Football Tournament	
1956	Riasat Ali	Muhammad Amin	1956 Far East tour	
1958	Nabi Chowdhury	Abdul Haq	1958 Asian Games	
1959	Masood ul Hassan Butt	Ibrahim	1959 tour to Burma	
1959–1960	Qayyum Changezi	Kabir Ahmed	1960 Merdeka Tournament	
1961	Ghulam Rabbani		1961 friendly series against Burma	
1961	Moosa Ghazi		1961 friendly series against Burma	
1962–1965	Muhammad Umer	Abdul Haq	1962 Merdeka Tournament 1965 RCD Cup	
1963	Muhammad Amin	Abid Hussain Ghazi	1964 Summer Olympics qualification	
1964	Abid Hussain Ghazi		1964 friendly series against China	
1966–1967	Turab Ali		1968 AFC Asian Cup qualification	
1967	Wali Muhammad		1968 AFC Asian Cup qualification	
1967	Muhammad Latif		1967 RCD Cup	
1968–1969	Murad Bakhsh		1969 Friendship Cup	
1969	Sardar Aslam		1969 RCD Cup	
1970	Younus Rana	Qadir Bakhsh	1970 Friendship Cup (as PFF XI)	
1970	Qadir Bakhsh	Hafizuddin Ahmed	1970 RCD Cup	
1973	Maula Bakhsh		1973 Far East tour	
1974	Ayub Dar		1974 RCD Cup	
1974	Ali Nawaz Baloch		1974 RCD Cup	
1974	Abdul Ghafoor		1974 Asian Games	
1976	Ghulam Sarwar Sr.		Afghanistan Republic Day Festival Cup 1976 Quaid-e-Azam International Tournament	
1978	Muhammad Ishaq Changezi		Saudi Arabia Football Federation International Tournament	
1981–1982	Muhammad Akbar Raisani	Naeem Gul	1981 King's Cup 1982 Quaid-e-Azam International Tournament	
1982–1983	Naeem Gul		1982 Bangladesh President's Gold Cup	
1984–1985	Muhammad Zulfiqar	Khalid Butt, Najeeb Ullah Najmi	1984 Merdeka Tournament 1985 Quaid-e-Azam International Tournament	
1985	Arbab Hayat Shahzada		1985 South Asian Games	
1986	Shaukat Mufti	Mukhtar Ali	1986 Fajr International Tournament 1986 President's Gold Cup International Tournament	
1986–1988	Mukhtar Ali		1986 Quaid-e-Azam International Tournament 1987 South Asian Games	
1986	Muhammad Naveed	Samuel Gill	1986 Asian Games	
1987	Sharafat Ali		1987 Quaid-e-Azam International Tournament	
1989–1990	Mateen Akhtar	Abdul Wahid, Zafar Iqbal	1989 South Asian Games 1990 Asian Games	
1991–1992	Ghulam Sarwar Teddy		1991 South Asian Games	
1992–1993	Zafar Iqbal		1992 Jordan International Tournament 1993 SAARC Gold Cup	
1993–1997	Muhammad Tariq Hussain	Tanveer ul Hasnain	1993 South Asian Games	
1995	Muhammad Nauman Khan		1995 SAARC Gold Cup	
1997	Qazi Ashfaq	Haroon Yousaf	1997 SAFF Gold Cup	
1998–2003	Haroon Yousaf		1999 SAFF Gold Cup 1999 South Asian Games 2003 SAFF Gold Cup	
2002	Sarfraz Rasool		2002 friendly series against Sri Lanka.	
2003–2011	Jaffar Khan	Samar Ishaq, Adnan Ahmed, Faisal Iqbal, Abdul Aziz	2005 SAFF Gold Cup 2006 AFC Challenge Cup 2011 SAFF Championship	
2005	Tanveer Ahmed		2005 Islamic Solidarity Games	
2006–2009	Muhammad Essa	Jaffar Khan	2009 SAFF Championship	
2008	Zahid Hameed	Imran Niazi	2008 SAFF Championship	
2010–2013	Samar Ishaq	Adnan Ahmed	2013 SAFF Championship	
2013–2019	Zesh Rehman		2013 Philippines Peace Cup	
2014	Kaleemullah Khan	Faisal Iqbal, Saddam Hussain	Test match against Lebanon.	
2014	Muhammad Ahmed		Test match against Lebanon.	
2015–2023	Hassan Bashir		2023 Mauritius Four Nations Cup 2023 SAFF Championship	
2018	Saddam Hussain	Hassan Bashir	2018 SAFF Championship	
2023	Saqib Hanif		Match against Maldives.	
2023	Yousuf Butt		2023 Mauritius Four Nations Cup	
2023–2024	Easah Suliman		2023 Mauritius Four Nations Cup	
2023	Otis Khan			
2024–present	Abdullah Iqbal			

=== Captains by major tournaments ===
- In Continental and International tournaments

Player	Tournament(s)
Moideen Kutty	1954 Asian Games
Nabi Chowdhury	1958 Asian Games
Abdul Ghafoor	1974 Asian Games
Muhammad Naveed	1986 Asian Games
Mateen Akhtar	1990 Asian Games
Jaffar Khan	2006 AFC Challenge Cup

== Bibliography ==
- Bhatti, Mukhtar (1999). Pakistan Sports An Almanac of Pakistan Sports with Complete Records 1947-1999 (3rd ed.). Bhatti Publications. pp. 237–250.
