= Masood Fakhri =

Pakistani footballer (1932–2016)

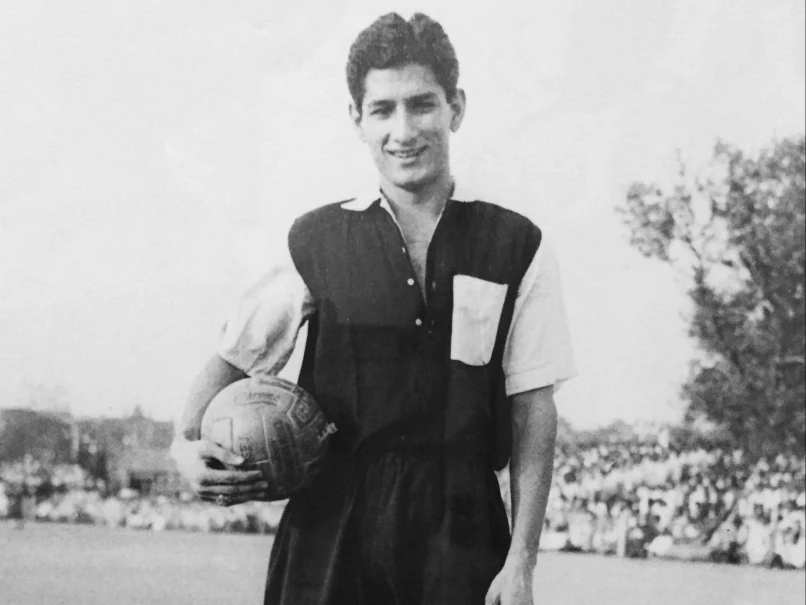
- Fakhri with Mohammedan Sporting in 1955

Personal information
- Full name: Masood Fakhri
- Date of birth: 16 November 1932
- Place of birth: Toba Tek Singh, Punjab, British India
- Date of death: 6 September 2016 (aged 83)
- Place of death: Bangor Teifi, Wales
- Height: 5 ft 9 in (1.75 m)
- Position: Left winger

Senior career*
Years	Team	Apps	(Gls)
1949–1952	Raiders		
1952–1954	East Bengal	30+	(25)
1953	North-Western Railway		
1955–1956	Kolkata Mohammedan		
1956	Rovers FC		
1956	Bata FC		
1956–1957	Bradford City		(0)

International career
1952–1955	Pakistan	13	(10)
- * Club domestic league appearances and goals

Masood Fakhri (Punjabi: مسعود فخری; 16 November 1932 – 6 September 2016) was a Pakistani professional footballer who played as a left winger. A former Pakistani international, Fakhri was well known for his time with Indian Kolkata clubs East Bengal and Mohammedan Sporting. He was the first Pakistani footballer to score a hat trick in an international game at the 1954 Asian Games, and the first player from South Asia to play in England, where he played for Bradford City before prematurely retiring.

== Early life ==
Fakhri was born on 16 November 1932 in Toba Tek Singh, Punjab, British India. His father, Nazir Hussain Siddiqi, served as a headmaster in Pakistan. Fakhri was one of eight siblings, with four brothers and three sisters.

== Club career ==
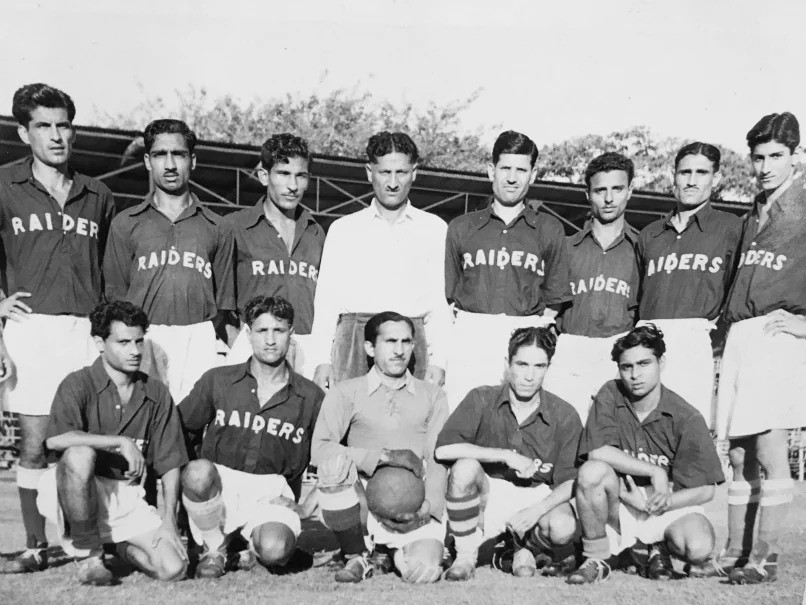
Fakhri, (standing at the far right) with Raiders in the early 1950s.

Fakhri began his club career with Raiders of Lahore in 1949. At the age of 18, he was also selected to represent the Punjab representative team in the second National Football Championship held at Quetta in 1950. He won the third season played two years later in 1952. He also represented Raiders the same year to play in the Rovers Cup in India where his team lost to Bombay Amateurs in the semi-finals, and they also beat Central Railways in the third place match.

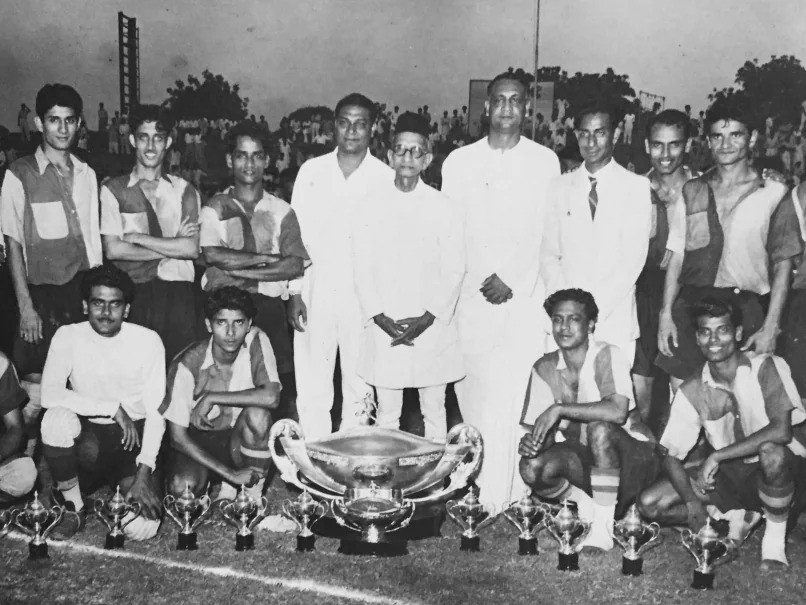
Fakhri standing at the far left with the 1952 DCM Trophy winning East Bengal team

In 1952 at the age of 20, he signed with Indian Calcutta Football League side East Bengal. During his first season with the club, Fakhri helped his side win the Calcutta Football League and the Durand Cup. He scored 14 goals in the Calcutta Football League alongside scoring the winning goals in his first two matches against East Bengal's biggest rivals, Mohun Bagan, and thus became a fan favorite among East Bengal supporters. Fakhri also helped the team win the DCM Trophy.

From April to May 1953 he returned to Pakistan representing North-Western Railway at the National Football Championship. Upon returning to Kolkata, he was part of the East Bengal team that played against German side Kickers Offenbach the following month. He also scored 5 goals in the Calcutta Football League. In August 1953, he was part of the East Bengal senior team's tour to the World Youth Festival in Bucharest, where he scored a goal against Lebanon XI in their 6–1 win and against Germany in the third-place play-offs in a 2–5 defeat. He also featured in the friendly against FC Torpedo Moscow the same month. The team returned from Europe to participate in the IFA Shield and reached the final where they faced Indian Cultural League. In August 1953, the Pakistan Football Federation reportedly prohibited Pakistani players from playing in India without a permit, but East Bengal still fielded Masood Fakhri and fellow countryman Niaz Ali, stating they had received permission from the PFF. On 3 October 1953, in the 1953 IFA Shield final against the Indian Cultural League on the third replayed final, Fakhri scored for East Bengal in the 34th minute. The game would result in a 1–1 tie. The I.C.L. team lodged a complaint with the Indian Football Association immediately after the match against East Bengal over their fielding the Pakistani players. On 11 October 1953, the IFA announced I.C.L. as the winners of the IFA Shield after East Bengal failed to produce a written permit for the Pakistani players from the PFF and suspended the club from all football activities until 31 December 1954. East Bengal challenged the decision and took the IFA to court after receiving a letter from the PFF president, Dr. A. M. Malik on 25 October 1953, and had their suspension revoked.

In 1954, when the National Football Championship was held in Lahore, he returned to his former team this time featuring under the name of Punjab Blue, finding the net in the 80th and 85th minutes against North-Western Railway in the final winning by 3–0.

In 1955, Fakhri signed with another Kolkata club, Mohammedan. He helped the team reach the 1955 Rovers Cup final, finishing as runners-up, losing to Mohun Bagan. The following year, he would go on to win the tournament with Mohammedan Sporting against Mohun Bagan where the team avenged their loss from the previous year.

After playing for Mohammedan Sporting, Fakhri returned to Pakistan, where he represented Rovers and Bata Sports Club in domestic competitions. A few months later, Fakhri was contacted by Bert Flatley, an English Football Association (FA) coach, regarding the idea of joining Bradford City. The team participated in the English football league's third division. On August 8, 1956, Fakhri officially signed a contract with the team following negotiations with Peter Jackson, the manager of the club at the time. In addition to paying his fare of £120, City secured him employment at Bradford's textile factories. Fakhri would make appearances in Bradford City's reserve team, however, he left football early for personal reasons in 1957 after just one season with the team.

== International career ==
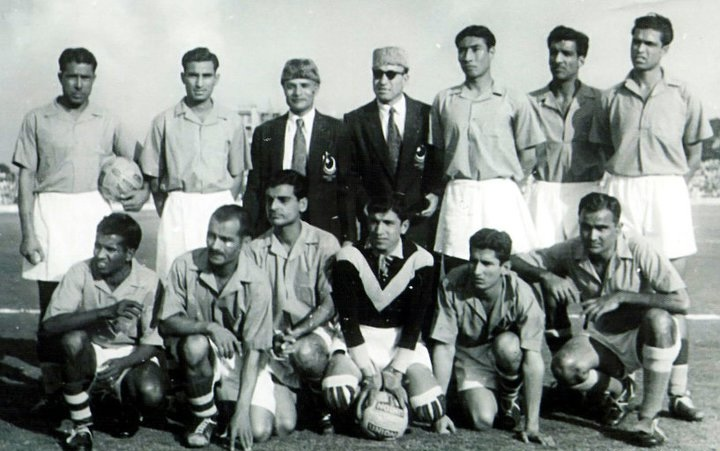
Fakhri with the Pakistan national team in 1955 (second sitting from right to left)

In 1952, Fakhri made his international debut with Pakistan at 1952 Asian Quadrangular Football Tournament against Ceylon, he also made an appearance against Burma. The same year, he played in a friendly match against Iran in YMCA Ground, Karachi, which resulted in a goalless draw.

On 25 April 1954, Fakhri found the net in a friendly against Singapore, which ended in a 2–2 draw. Later on in the starting group stage match of the 1954 Asian Games in Manila, Philippines on 2 May 1954, Fakhri became the first player from Pakistan to score a hat-trick in an international match, as Pakistan thumped Singapore 6–2. He completed the hat-trick in 5 minutes, scoring at the 42nd, 43rd and 47th minutes of the match. He also scored against Burma in a 1–2 loss. Later he was selected for the 1954 Asian Quadrangular Football Tournament. He was starter for Pakistan in all three games that the team played, scoring against Burma and India.

The following year, Fakhri represented Pakistan at the 1955 Asian Quadrangular Football Tournament, where he featured in all three games and found the net twice against Ceylon and a goal against India. He also appeared in a friendly against India after the conclusion of the tournament.

== Personal life ==
Fakhri married Rhoda Eileen and lived in Llanrwst, North Wales. His brother's family settled in Great Britain as well. After retiring from football, Fakhri lived out the rest of his life living in Bangor Teifi, Wales.

== Death ==
Fakhri died on 6 September 2016, at the age of 83, at the Gwynedd Hospital in Wales.

== Legacy ==
"The first day I saw Masood Fakhri, I must have been 16. I kept looking at him. It felt as if some prince from a fairytale had come straight into the football field."

— Chuni Goswami wrote as a column in Ananda Bazar Patrika.

Fakhri was renowned for his excellent speed, dribbling, close control, and attacking abilities, being a frequent starter in the Calcutta Football League and on the international stage for Pakistan. Former national team players Moosa Ghazi and Ghulam Rabbani praised Fakhri's game, stating that were lucky that Masood Fakhri went to London early, otherwise it would not have been possible to take the position as a left-winger in his presence.

Fakhri was also one of the most influential football players in the Indian subcontinent. It is also reported that he was the first ever footballer from the subcontinent to play in England for Bradford City in the late 1950s.

== Career statistics ==
=== International goals ===
Scores and results list Pakistan's goal tally first, score column indicates score after each Fakhri goal.

List of international goals scored by Masood Fakhri
No.	Date	Venue	Opponent	Score	Result	Competition	Ref.
1	25 April 1954	Jalan Besar Stadium, Kallang, Singapore	Singapore		2–2	Friendly	
2	2 May 1954	Rizal Memorial Stadium, Manila, Philippines	Singapore	3–1	6–2	1954 Asian Games	
3	2 May 1954	Rizal Memorial Stadium, Manila, Philippines	Singapore	4–1	6–2	1954 Asian Games	
4	2 May 1954	Rizal Memorial Stadium, Manila, Philippines	Singapore	5–2	6–2	1954 Asian Games	
5	5 May 1954	Rizal Memorial Stadium, Manila, Philippines	Burma	2–1	2–1	1954 Asian Games	
6	19 December 1954	Calcutta FC Ground, Kolkata, India	Burma		1–1	1954 Asian Quadrangular Football Tournament	
7	26 December 1954	Calcutta FC Ground, Kolkata, India	India		1–3	1954 Asian Quadrangular Football Tournament	
8	21 December 1955	Dacca Stadium, Dhaka, East Pakistan	Ceylon	1–0	2–1	1955 Asian Quadrangular Football Tournament	
9	21 December 1955	Dacca Stadium, Dhaka, East Pakistan	Ceylon	2–0	2–1	1955 Asian Quadrangular Football Tournament	
10	24 December 1955	Dacca Stadium, Dhaka, East Pakistan	India		1–2	1955 Asian Quadrangular Football Tournament	

== Honours ==
=== Punjab ===
- National Football Championship:
  - Winners (2): 1952, 1954

=== East Bengal ===
- Calcutta League:
  - Winners (1): 1952
- Durand Cup:
  - Winners (1): 1952
- DCM Trophy:
  - Winners (1): 1952

=== Mohammedan Sporting ===
- Rovers Cup:
  - Winners (1): 1956
  - Runners-up (1): 1955

=== Pakistan ===
- Asian Quadrangular Football Tournament:
  - Winners (1): 1952
  - Runners-up (1): 1955
  - Third-place (1): 1954

== See also ==
- List of footballers who achieved hat-trick records
- List of Pakistan national football team hat-tricks
- List of foreign players for SC East Bengal
