= Ismail Jan =

Pakistani former footballer

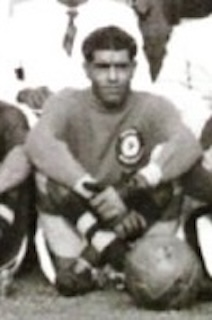
- Ismail with Jinnah Gymkhana in 1949

Personal information
- Full name: Muhammad Ismail Jan Durrani
- Date of birth: Unknown
- Place of birth: Quetta, British India
- Date of death: Unknown
- Position: Goalkeeper

Senior career*
Years	Team	Apps	(Gls)
1930s	Sandemanians		
1940s	Bhawanipore		
1940s	Mohammedan		

International career
1946	India XI		
1952	Pakistan	4	(0)
- * Club domestic league appearances and goals

Ismail Jan Durrani (Urdu: اسماعیل جان درانی) was a Pakistani footballer who played as a goalkeeper. Jan is regarded as one of the most notable Pakistani goalkeepers of the 1950s. He won the 1952 Asian Quadrangular Football Tournament with Pakistan.

== Early life ==
Ismail was born in Quetta, capital of the Balochistan Agency, British India.

== Club career ==
Ismail played for Sandemanians early into his career, and represented the NWIFA for the 1941–42 Santosh Trophy. He then represented Calcutta Football League Bhawanipore Club throughout the 1940s, he played for the Bengal football team at the Santosh Trophy, and also played for Mohammedan.

In 1946, the Mysore Football Association alleged three players, including Ismail, along with Taj Mohammad Sr. and Osman Jan, had played in Quetta the year before. This was a contradiction to Rule 33, which stated that a player can also play for a home club while playing in the Calcutta League. All three players were suspended for two months. Two years later, Ismail was selected to represent an I.F.A. XI against the visiting Burma national team.

In 1949, Ismail was a part of the Jinnah Gymkhana team which toured Burma and Ceylon, where he achieved amazing saves throughout the tours and was also a frequent starter for the club.

Ismail also played for Hydari Sports in the 1950s, he also represented, Balochistan and Karachi football team at the National Football Championship.

== International career ==
In 1946, he was selected for an Indian XI to tour the country of South Africa. Two years later, Ismail was selected to represent an I.F.A. XI against the visiting Burma national team.

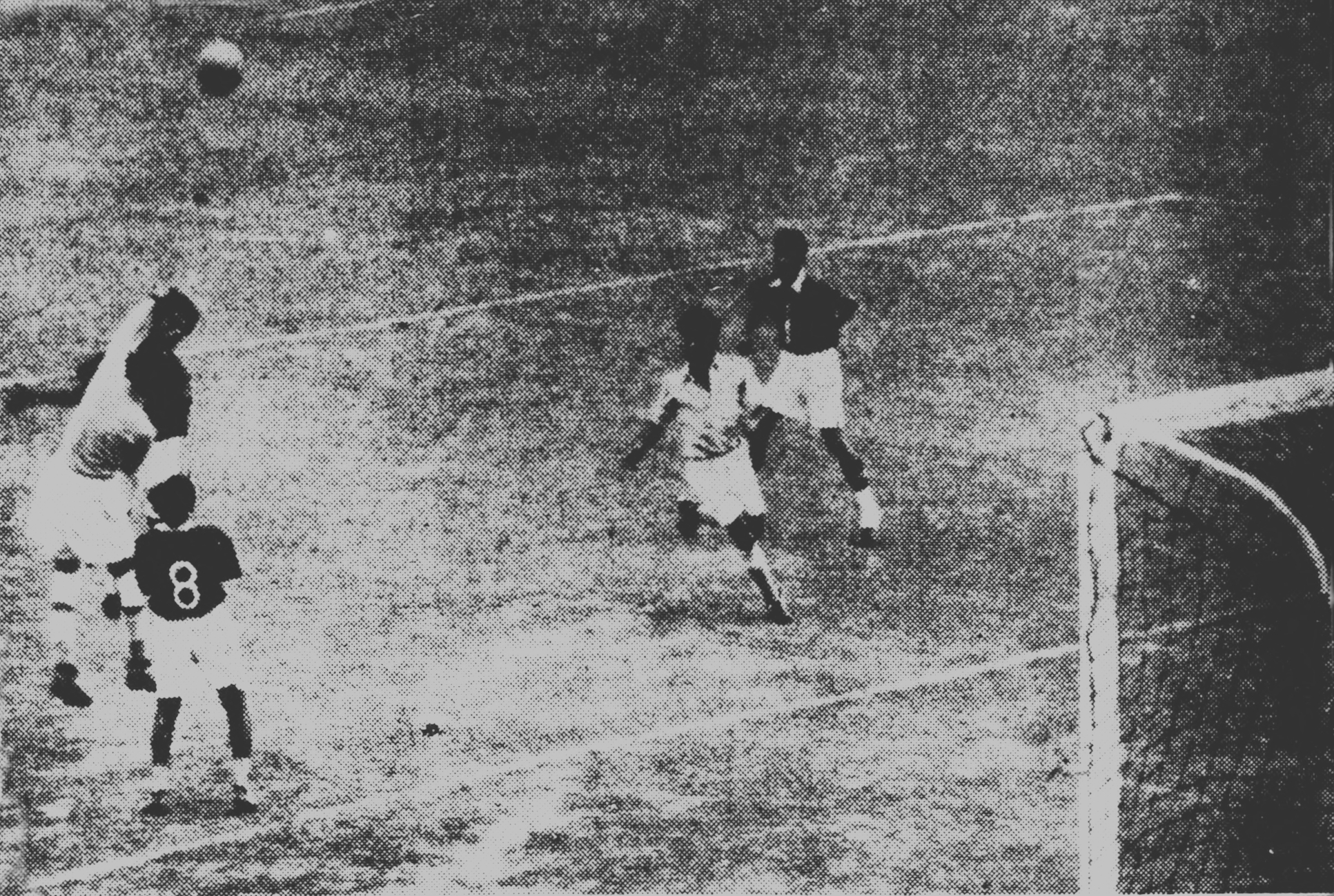
Jan punting the ball away in an encounter during the game between Pakistan and Ceylon at the 1952 Asian Quadrangular Football Tournament.

In 1952, Ismail was selected as the starting goalkeeper for the 1952 Asian Quadrangular Football Tournament held in Colombo, Ceylon. In the tournament, he featured against Ceylon, Burma, and India, keeping a clean sheet throughout the tournament. The same year, Ismail was included in the Pakistan squad for their friendly match against Iran.

== Post-retirement ==
After retirement as player in the 1950s, Jan served as member of the selection committee of the Pakistan Football Federation, for the 1958 Asian Games. Jan was selected as manager of the Pakistan national team for their participation at the 1974 Asian Games, with Mohammad Rahmatullah as head coach.

== Honours ==
Pakistan

- Asian Quadrangular Football Tournament:
  - Winners (1): 1952

Bengal

- Santosh Trophy: 1945–46
