= Shamoo Abdul Ghani =

Pakistani footballer

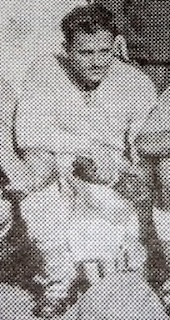
- Shamoo in 1953

Personal information
- Date of birth: Unknown
- Place of birth: Karachi, British India
- Date of death: Unknown
- Position: Goalkeeper

Senior career*
Years	Team	Apps	(Gls)
1950s	Karachi Port Trust		

International career
1953–1954	Pakistan		
- * Club domestic league appearances and goals

Shamoo Abdul Ghani was a Pakistani footballer who played as a goalkeeper for Karachi Port Trust (KPT). He also played for the Pakistan national team. Shamoo is regarded as one of the most prominent goalkeepers of Pakistan in the 1950s.

== Club career ==
Shamoo makes a save during the 1954 Rovers Cup final.

Shamoo started playing football in Keamari Islamia High School in Karachi. He then joined Karachi Port Trust, where he played and captained the team throughout the 1950s. In 1959, he clinched the President's Gold Cup with the team. In 1959, Shamoo was part of the KPT team which embarked on a tour of Portuguese-ruled Goa to play two friendly matches. He also represented and captained the Karachi football team at the National Football Championship, being selected for the first time in 1952.

He was also a part of the Keamari Union squad which participated in the 1954 Rovers Cup.

== International career ==
In 1953, Shamoo was selected to represent the Pakistan national football team for their participation in the 1953 Asian Quadrangular Football Tournament. The next year, he represented Pakistan at the 1954 Asian Games, where he played as starter against Burma.

== Post-retirement ==
After retirement as player, Shamoo remained employed with Karachi Port Trust. In February 1967, Shamoo along with 9 fellow workers of Karachi Port Trust were arrested because of participating in strikes.
