= Rashid Tabassum =

Pakistani sports administrator

- Born: Unknown; British India
- Died: Unknown
- Occupations: sports administrator and hockey supervisor
- Years active: 1949-1971

Pakistan Hockey Federation Representative

Rashid Tabassum, was one of the earliest Pakistani sports administrators involved in professional football and hockey, in 1950s to 1971. He is known for being involved in various sport bodies. He also served as a political figure.

== Administrative career ==
=== Hockey ===
Rashid served as the honorary secretary of the Karachi Hockey Association, along with the Karachi Olympic Association from 1963 to 1971. He was also a member of the selection committee for the national team, and served as a representative for the organization as well.

=== Football ===
Rashid also played a major role in influencing the sport of football. Serving as a member of the Sind—Karachi Football Association. From around 1950 to 1960, He was also a part of the Pakistan Football Federation as an associate secretary.

Rashid was also crucial in the formation of the Jinnah Gymkhana football team. Rashid, who was a Muslim League loyalist, forged the way for the club's creation. Serving as the manager of the team.

== Outside sports ==
Rashid was also a part of the Muslim League.
