= Mohammad Kassim (footballer) =

Pakistani former footballer

Kassim
Personal information
- Full name: Mohammad Kassim
- Date of birth: Unknown
- Place of birth: British India
- Date of death: Unknown
- Position: Inside right

Senior career*
Years	Team	Apps	(Gls)
1948–1950s	Sindh		
1949	Jinnah Gymkhana		

International career
1950	Pakistan		
- * Club domestic league appearances and goals

Mohammad Kassim, alternatively spelled as Mohammad Qassim (Urdu: محمد قاسم;) was a former association footballer, who played as a forward for the Pakistan national team in 1950.

== Club career ==
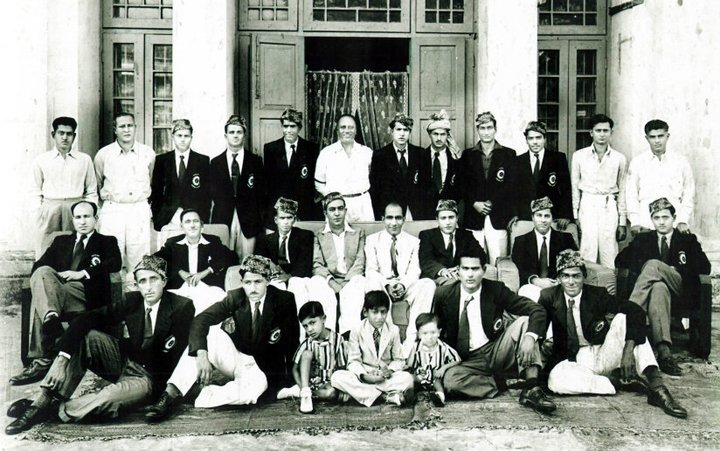
Kassim (front sitting row, extreme right) with Jinnah Gymkhana in 1949.

Kassim represented the Sindh football team at the National Football Championship in the late 1940s till the 1950s.

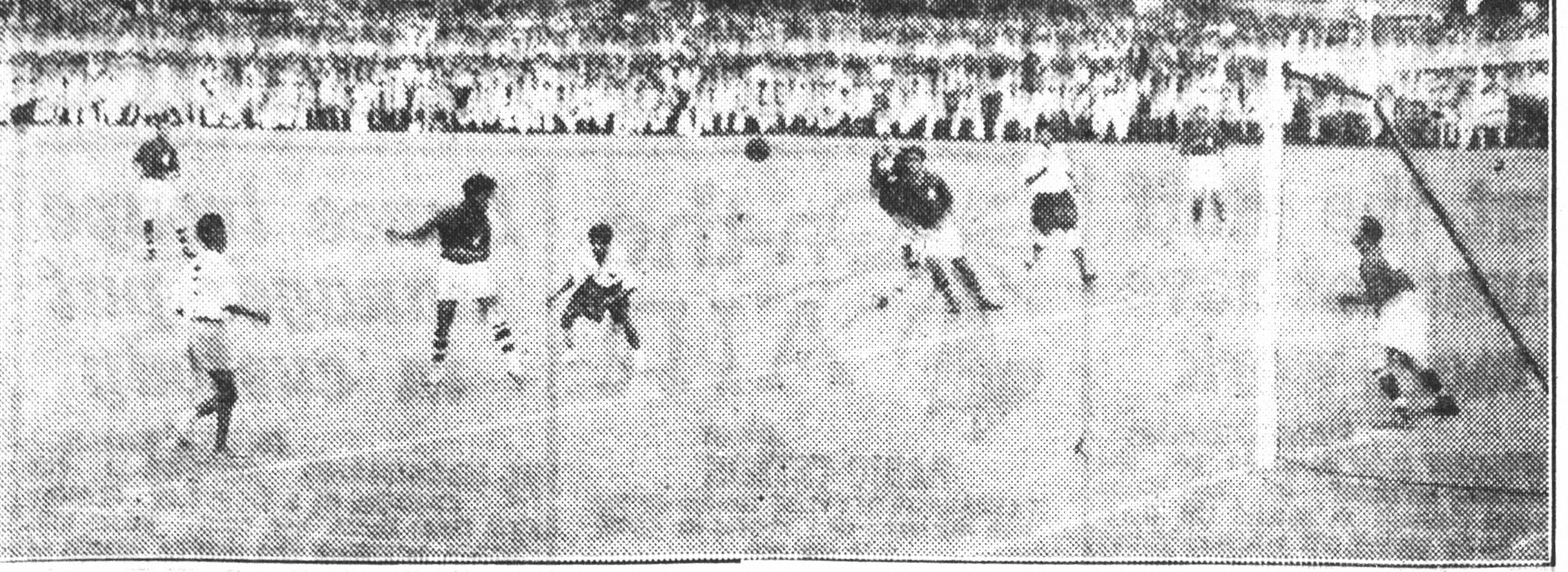
Kassim seen heading the ball towards the goalposts, guarded by goalkeeper Abid.

In 1949, Kassim was a part of the Jinnah Gymkhana football team's tour to Burma and Ceylon. In the tour, Kassim would be praised for his goal-scoring abilities, even scoring a hat-trick in one of the games, against the Ceylon football team.

Kassim also represented the Sindh football team at the National Football Championship.

== International career ==
Kassim was selected for the Pakistan national football team for their tours to Iran and Iraq in 1950. Being Included in the lineup for the national team's first ever match, which was against Iran, along with playing in the match against Al-Haras Al-Malaki for the national team's Iraq tour.
