= 1952 Asian Quadrangular Football Tournament =

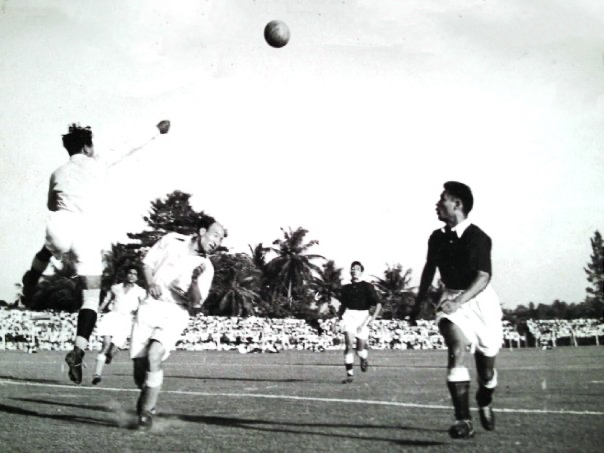
- Pakistan vs Burma during the 1952 Asian Quadrangular Football Tournament

Tournament details
- Host country: Ceylon
- Dates: 9–23 March 1952
- Teams: 4 (from 1 confederation)
- Venue: 1 (in 1 host city)

Final positions
- Champions: India (1st title); Pakistan (1st title)
- Third place: Burma; Ceylon

Tournament statistics
- Matches played: 5
- Goals scored: 10 (2 per match)
- Top scorer: (India) Sheoo Mewalal (4 goals)

The 1952 Asian Quadrangular Football Tournament was the first edition of the Asian Quadrangular Football Tournament held in Colombo, Ceylon. India and Pakistan were declared as the joint winners.

== Overview ==
The 1952 Asian Quadrangular Football Tournament was the inaugural edition of the competition. It was held at the Colombo Oval in Ceylon (now Sri Lanka), with the opening ceremony officiated by Sir Alan Rose.

The tournament took place from March 9 to March 23, featuring four national teams: Burma, Ceylon, India and Pakistan. Matches lasted 60 minutes.

As the competition ended without a clear winner, a coin toss was used to decide which team would hold the trophy for the first six months. Pakistan won the toss and was awarded the trophy. However, the Indian team protested, arguing that they had scored more goals over the course of the tournament and therefore deserved to be declared the winners.

== Squads ==
Ceylon	Burma	Pakistan
Coach: Neville Abeygunawardena: E. A. Parker; T. H. B. Munna; T. H. Noor (captain); T. H. Soono; E. Ramasamy; Basheer Ahmed; K. Poddiappuhamy; Andrew Fernando; J. Howell; G. Lyall; J. Kitchener; K. Sugathapala; Tom Ossen; K. S. Richard; C. S. Richard; Subood; Jabir; Naylor; Veeriah; Krishnarajah	Coach: U. Maung Maung Gai: Saw Myat Zin; Hla Maung; Maung Thaung; Saw Tha Din; Ronny D'Mello; Tin Lay; Hla Kyaing; Ba Kyu; Khin Maung Aye; C. Anderson; Aung Shein; Chan Sein; Gordon Samuel; Sein Hine; Pe Khin; Htoo Wa; Aung Khin; Kyaw Sein; R. Gale; Tun Shein	Coach: Mohammad Shahjahan: Abdul Wahid Durrani (captain); Moideen Kutty; Jamil Akhtar; Sumbal Khan; Ibrar Hussain Bali; Ahmed Ali Phullo; Taj Mohammad Jr.; A. Hannan; Masood Fakhri; Ghulam Muhammad; Abdul Majid; H. Hassan; Niaz Ali; Muhammad Ramzan Sr.; Shafi Muhammad; Abdul Ghani; Ismail Jan; Muhammad Ramzan Jr.

== Results ==
Pos	Team	Pld	W	D	L	GF	GA	GD	Pts	Final result
1	India	3	2	1	0	7	0	+7	5	Champions
2	Pakistan	3	2	1	0	3	0	+3	5	Champions
3	Burma	2	0	0	2	0	5	−5	0	
4	Ceylon	2	0	0	2	0	5	−5	0	

Source: RSSSF

Notes: The competition rules stated that, in the event of a tie on points, goal average would be the tiebreaker. However, the organising committee took the view that goal average could not be considered, since neither India nor Pakistan had conceded any goals, and consequently it was decided that the trophy should be shared. Pakistan won a coin toss to decide which country would receive the trophy for the first six months.

== Matches ==
9 March 1952

Ceylon	0–3	India
	Report	Venkatesh 13', 50'; Mewalal 45'

Colombo Oval, Colombo
Attendance: 10,000
Referee: Mr. A. Roy (India)

16 March 1952

India	4–0	Burma
Mewalal 20', 29', 35'; Venkatesh 53'	Report

Colombo Oval, Colombo
Attendance: 12,500
Referee: P. S. Swales (Ceylon)

18 March 1952

Ceylon	0–2	Pakistan
	Report	Wahid 8'; Kutty 34'

Colombo Oval, Colombo
Referee: U. Kim Teikh (Burma)

20 March 1952

Pakistan	1–0	Burma
Sharif 45'	Report

Colombo Oval, Colombo
Referee: Mr. B. M. Mantara (Ceylon)

22 March 1952

Burma	Cancelled	Ceylon

Colombo Oval, Colombo
- cancelled due to the death of Ceylon's Prime Minister Mr. Don Stephen Senanayake.

23 March 1952

India	0–0	Pakistan
	Report

Colombo Oval, Colombo
Referee: U. Kim Teikh (Burma)

== Statistics ==
=== Goalscorers ===
There were 10 goals scored in 5 matches, for an average of 2 goals per match.

4 goals

- (India) Sheoo Mewalal

3 goals

- (India) Pansanttom Venkatesh

1 goal

- (India) Runu Guha Thakurta
- (Pakistan) Abdul Wahid Durrani
- (Pakistan) Muhammad Sharif
- (Pakistan) Moideen Kutty
