= Basheer Ahmed (footballer) =

Ceylonese former footballer

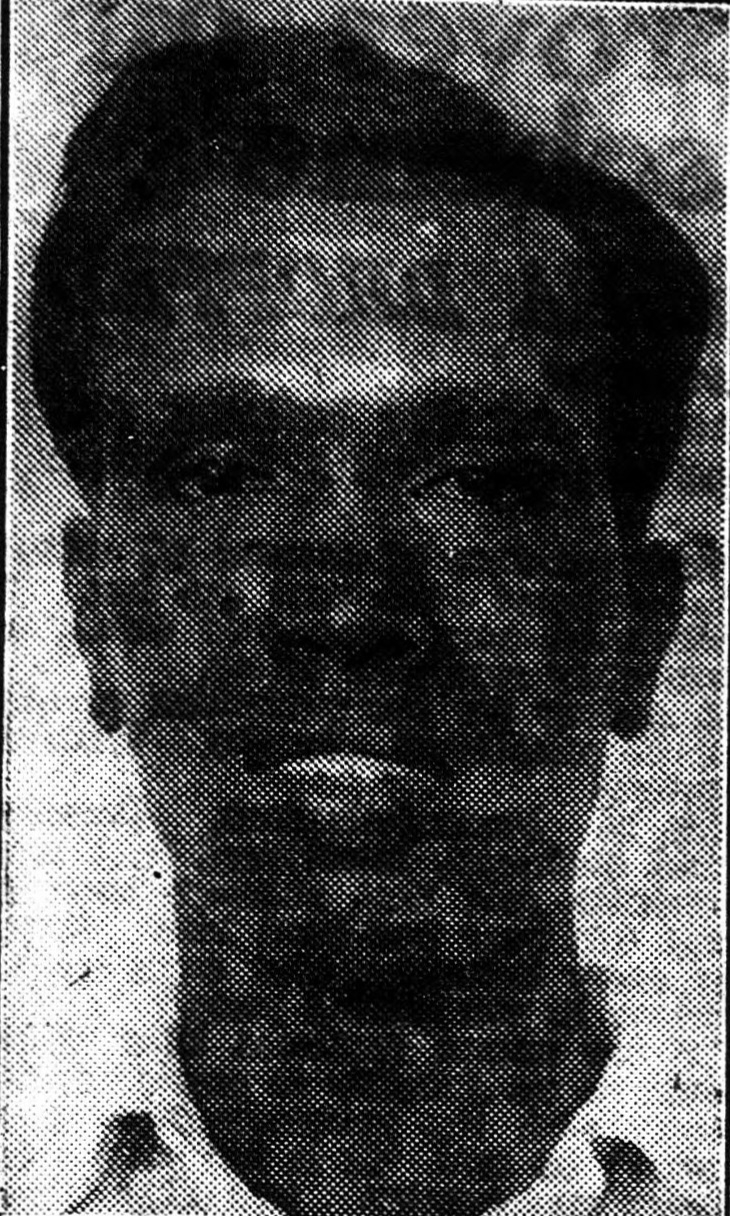
- Basheer in 1949

Personal information
- Full name: Basheer Ahmed
- Place of birth: British India
- Place of death: Sri Lanka
- Positions: Midfielder; defender

Senior career*
Years	Team	Apps	(Gls)
1930s	Colombo United FC		
1940s	Saunders		

International career
1944–1953	Ceylon		
- * Club domestic league appearances and goals

Basheer Ahmed was a former footballer who played for the Saunders in the 1940s and early 1950s. He is also regarded as one of the best players to have represented the Ceylon national team.

== Club career ==
Ahmed played for Colombo United football club, before joining Saunders and playing for them for most of his career, helping them earn several championships.

In 1949, Ahmed represented a City League XI against the touring Jinnah Gymkhana club. Who had visited the country to play friendlies.

== International career ==
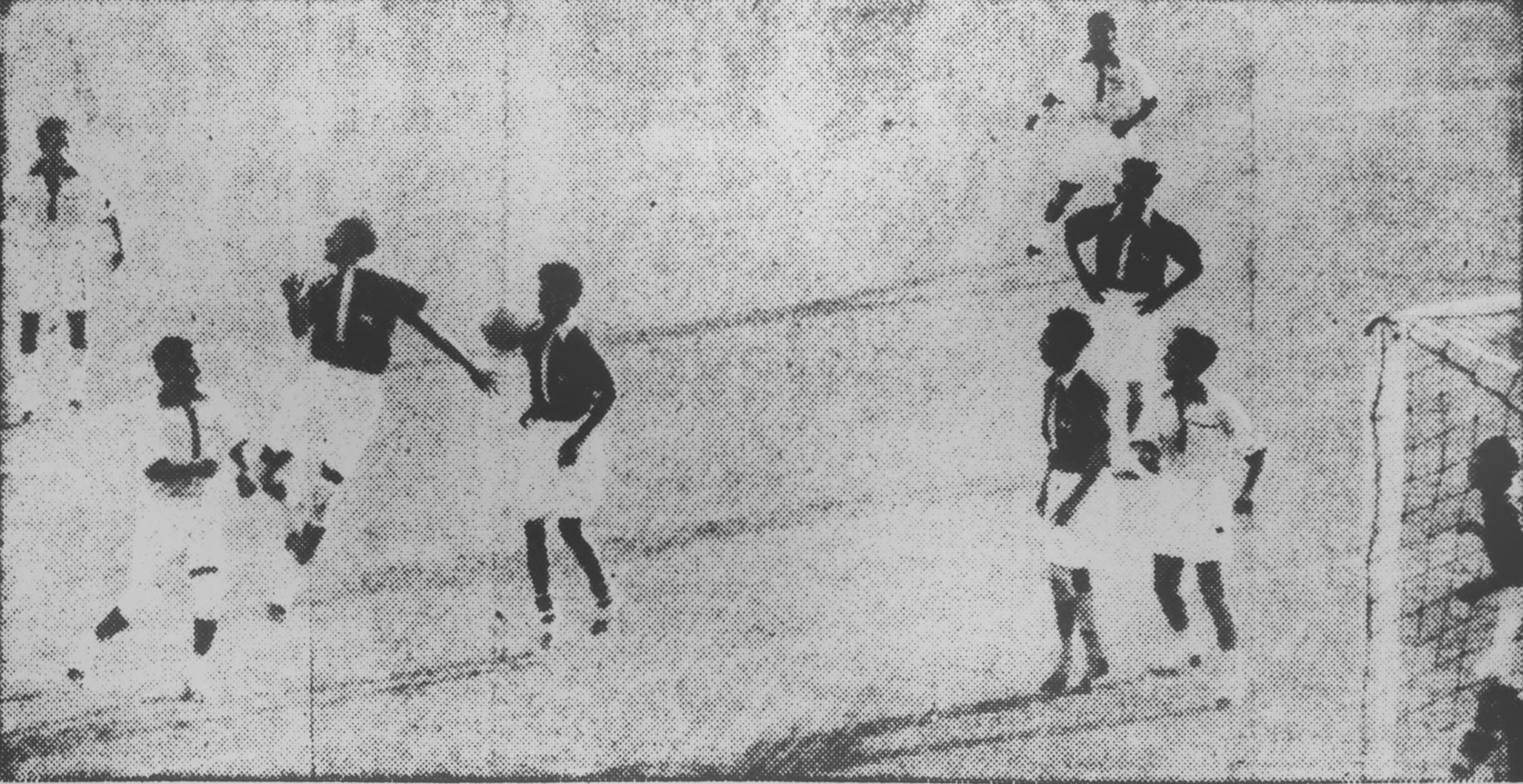
Ahmed (In dark shirt) controlling the ball with his chest in the opening match of the 1952 Asian Quadrangular Football Tournament.

In 1944, Ahmed was selected for the Ceylon football team to tour Mysore and Bangalore. The same year he played against the visiting All-India football team.

In 1952, Ahmed represented Ceylon at the 1st Asian Quadrangular Football Tournament. Where he was a starter in both matches that the national team played, finishing the tournament in third place alongside Burma. He also represented them in the 1953 edition of the tournament.
