= Pakistan Combined Services football team =

Pakistani football club

Pakistan Combined Services
- Ground: Army Stadium, Rawalpindi
- Owners: Pakistan Armed Forces

The Pakistan Combined Services football team serves as the football section of the Pakistan Armed Forces. The team is drawn from several players from the Pakistan Army, Pakistan Air Force, and Pakistan Navy football teams.

== History ==
In 1953, the team won against a touring Austrian team in Karachi, with Nabi Chowdhury of Pakistan Air Force scoring a hat trick.

The Pakistan Combined Services football team participated in the 1955 Six-Nation Army Tournament that took place in Iran, which showcased army football teams from India, Iran, Turkey, Iraq, and Syria. The team achieved victories against India and Iran, secured a draw against Syria and Iraq, but faced a loss to Turkey. Overall, they finished in the third position behind the Turkish and Iranian teams in the Army Tournament.

During the Iran Services team tour of Pakistan in March 1956, the Iranian team secured a 2–1 victory over Karachi at the YMCA Ground in Karachi in their first match. In their match against the Pakistan Combined Services team, the team managed to defeat the visitors by 2–1, avenging Karachi's earlier loss. In November 1956, the team again toured Iran, to playing three exhibition matches in Tehran against the Iranian Army–Air Force XI, a civil team, and the Navy–Civil XI.

In March 1984, the Sri Lankan Combined Services team toured Pakistan to play two matches against the Pakistan Combined Services. In the first match in 14 March at Peshawar, the visitors lost 0–1, and in the second match in 16 March in Rawalpindi, the visitors again lost by 1–2.

In 1999, the Pakistan Combined Services football team, under the captainship of Najeeb Ullah Najmi, toured Iran.

== See also ==
- Combined Services (Pakistan) cricket team
