= Abdul Wahid Durrani =

Pakistani footballer

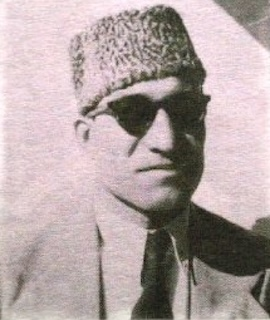

Personal information
- Full name: Abdul Wahid Khan Durrani
- Date of birth: 30 June 1917
- Place of birth: Quetta, British India
- Date of death: 24 February 2008 (aged 90)
- Place of death: Quetta, Pakistan
- Position: Forward

Senior career*
Years	Team	Apps	(Gls)
1940s	Muslim Club Quetta		
1940s	Sandemanians Club Quetta		

International career
1950–1952	Pakistan	5	(2)

Managerial career
- 1955: Pakistan
- * Club domestic league appearances and goals

Abdul Wahid Khan Durrani (Urdu, Pashto: عبدالوحید درانی; 30 June 1917 – 24 February 2008) was a Pakistani international footballer and manager. Wahid scored the first ever goal of the Pakistan national football team in their international debut against Iran in 1950, and was the second captain of the national side after the goalkeeper Osman Jan.

== Club career ==
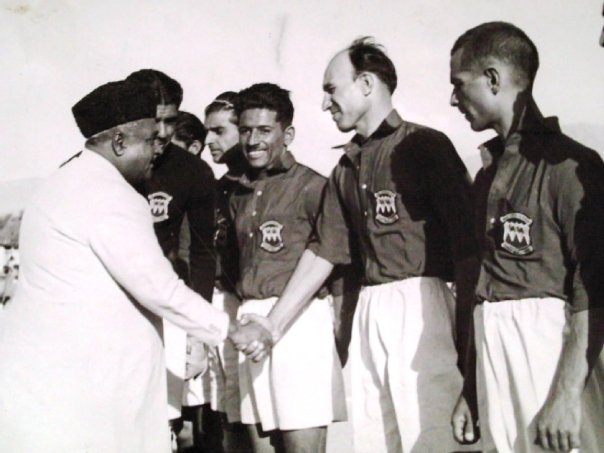
Abdul Wahid (right) shaking hands with the second governor and prime minister of Pakistan Khawaja Nazimuddin (left) during his playing days.

In the 1940s, Wahid played for several Quetta based clubs such as Muslim Club Quetta and Sandemanians Club Quetta. He also represented the NWIFA football team at the 1941–42 Santosh Trophy.

Wahid was part of the Jinnah Gymkhana football team which toured Burma and Ceylon in 1949. He represented the Balochistan football team at the National Football Championship, notably scoring in the final of the 1950 edition.

== International career ==
Wahid made his debut in Pakistan's first ever international match on 27 October 1950 against Iran at Amjadiyeh Stadium in Teheran, where he scored the first ever goal of the national team from an assist from Taj Mohammad Jr., 10 minutes after the second half in a 1–5 defeat.

He later became captain of the Pakistan national football team in the 1952 Asian Quadrangular Football Tournament, where he scored a goal against Ceylon. He also scored two headers against Burma in the following match but both were disallowed, due to him being offside. Wahid also appeared in the last match against India ended in a goalless draw and Pakistan emerged as joint winners of the tournament after finishing with the same points in the table. Later the same year, he also captained the side in friendly home matches against Iran the same year.

== Managerial career ==
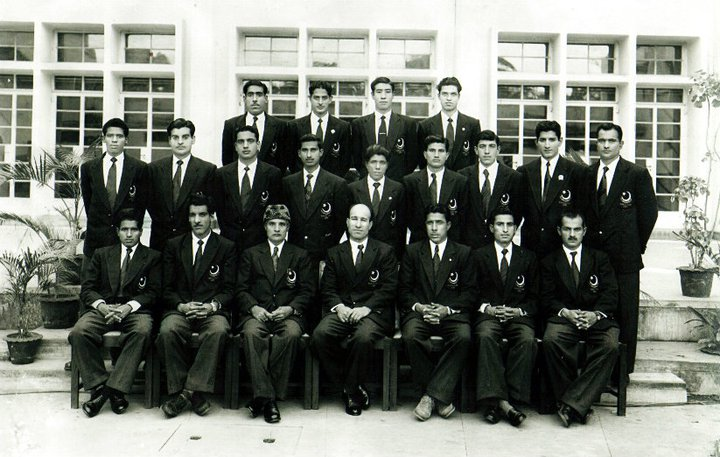
Durrani in the bottom middle as manager of the Pakistan national team in 1955

Wahid was appointed as the manager of the Pakistan international team in the fourth 1955 Asian Quadrangular Football Tournament held in Dhaka, East Pakistan (now Bangladesh), under his coaching spell, Pakistan achieved victories over Burma and Ceylon, however, lost the final match of the tournament against India.

After serving several years as member of the Pakistan Football Federation selection committee, Wahid acted as assistant manager at the Merdeka Tournament in 1984.

== Personal life ==
During the violence of the partition of British India, Abdul Wahid Durrani helped Hindu men and women who had sought refuge in his home in Quetta, and escorted them to the station, effectively saving their lives.

== Career statistics ==
=== International goals ===
Scores and results list Pakistan's goal tally first, score column indicates score after each Wahid goal.

List of international goals scored by Abdul Wahid Durrani
No.	Date	Venue	Opponent	Score	Result	Competition	Ref.
1	27 October 1950	Amjadieh Stadium, Tehran, Iran	Iran	1–4	1–5	Friendly	
2	18 March 1952	Colombo Oval, Colombo, Ceylon	Ceylon	1–0	2–0	1952 Asian Quadrangular Football Tournament	

== Honours ==
Pakistan

- Asian Quadrangular Football Tournament:
  - Winners (1): 1952

== See also ==
- List of Pakistan national football team captains
- List of Pakistan national football team managers
