= Taj Mohammad Jr. =

Pakistani former footballer

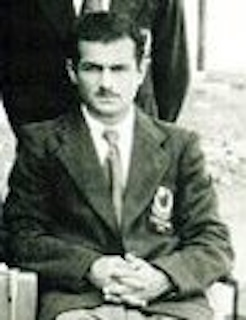
- Taj in 1953

Personal information
- Full name: Taj Mohammad Jr.
- Date of birth: Unknown
- Place of birth: Quetta district, British India
- Position: Forward

Senior career*
Years	Team	Apps	(Gls)
1935–??	Ordnance Depot Quetta		

International career
1950–1956	Pakistan		
- * Club domestic league appearances and goals

Taj Mohammad (Urdu: تاج محمد;) also known as Taj Junior, was a Pakistani footballer who played as a forward. Taj is among the major players of the Pakistan national football team in the 1950s.

== Early life ==
Mohammad was born in Quetta, capital of the Balochistan Agency, British India.

== Club career ==
Mohammad was affiliated with the Ordnance Depot Quetta football team since 1945, and also served as the team captain. In 1949, Mohammad toured Burma and Ceylon Jinnah Gymkhana. In 1954, he captained Friends Union during their tour to southern India.

Mohammad also represented the Balochistan football team selection at the National Football Championship, including in the 1948 inaugural edition. He scored the lone goal in the 1959 edition of the final.

== International career ==
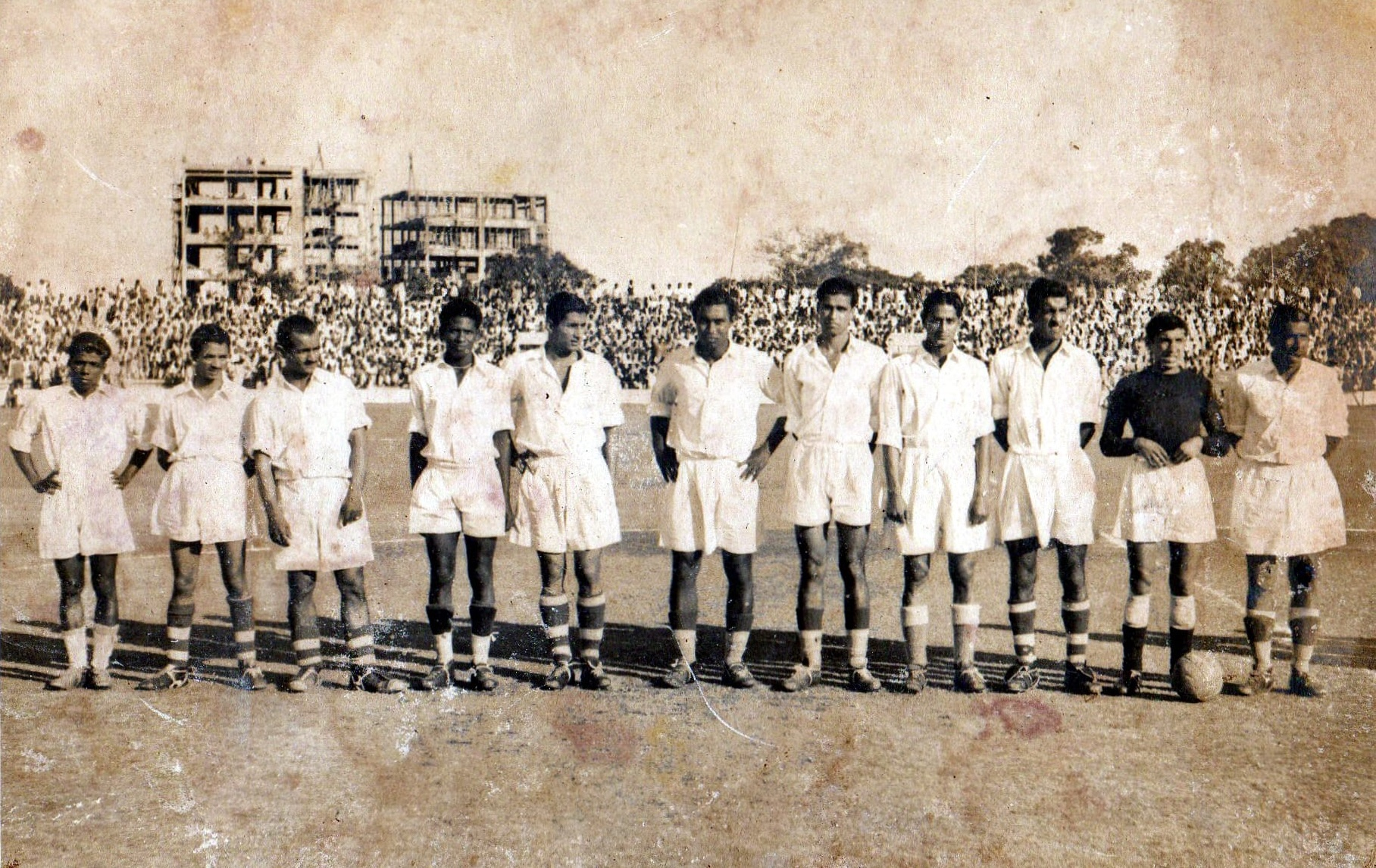
Mohammad standing third from left with Pakistan in 1955.

Mohammad was a member of the Pakistan national team for their tour to Iran and Iraq in 1950. In Pakistan's first ever international match on 27 October 1950 against Iran at Amjadiyeh Stadium in Teheran, Taj gave an assist to Abdul Wahid Durrani to score the first ever goal of the national team, 10 minutes after the second half in a 1–5 defeat.

Two years later, he played against Iran in a friendly match at Karachi.

In 1954, Mohammad participated with the national team for the 1954 Asian Games held at Manila, Philippines. He also played at the 1953 and the 1955 editions of the Asian Quadrangular Football Tournament.

== Honours ==
Pakistan

- Asian Quadrangular Football Tournament:
  - Runners-up (2): 1955, 1953

=== Balochistan ===
- National Football Championship:
  - Winners (3): 1950, 1956, 1959
