= Ibrahim (footballer) =

Pakistani footballer

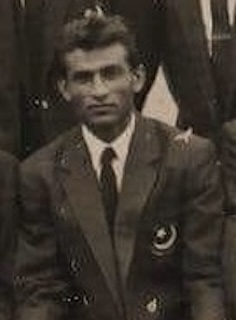
- Ibrahim in 1959

Personal information
- Date of birth: Unknown
- Place of birth: Karachi, British India
- Date of death: Unknown
- Position: Left winger

Youth career
- 1949–: Keamari Union

Senior career*
Years	Team	Apps	(Gls)
1950s	Karachi Port Trust		

International career
1954–1959	Pakistan		
- * Club domestic league appearances and goals

Ibrahim (Urdu: ابراہیم) was a Pakistani footballer who played as a left winger for Karachi Port Trust. In 1959, he also served as the vice-captain of the Pakistan national team.

== Early life ==
Ibrahim hailed from the Keamari locality of Karachi.

== Club career ==
Ibrahim started his career with Keamari Union of Karachi in 1949. He then joined Karachi Port Trust, where he played and captained the team throughout the 1950s. He also represented and captained the Karachi football team at the National Football Championship.

In 1959, Ibrahim captained KPT when the team embarked on a tour of Portuguese-ruled Goa to play two friendly matches. In 1960, he sustained a major leg injury, and the next year a benefit football match was held in Karachi to cover his treatment.

== International career ==
In 1954, Ibrahim was selected to represent the Pakistan national football team for their participation in the 1954 Asian Games, where he played against Singapore and Burma. he was also included in the national team squad for the 1958 Asian Games. In 1959, he also served as the vice-captain of the Pakistan national team for their tour to Burma.

Ibrahim was also present with the national side for several friendlies played throughout the 1950s, where he featured against sides such as Singapore, Malaya, China, etc.

== See also ==
- List of Pakistan national football team captains
