= M. Abid (footballer) =

Ceylonese former footballer

- Abid during his playing days

Personal information
- Full name: A. H. M. Abid
- Date of birth: Unknown
- Place of birth: Kandy, Ceylon
- Date of death: 15 October 1950
- Place of death: Bambalapitiya, Ceylon

Senior career*
Years	Team	Apps	(Gls)
1944–19??	Harlequins S.C.		
- Colombo Central Colours

International career
1949	Ceylon XI		
- * Club domestic league appearances and goals

A. H. M. Abid was a Ceylonese former footballer who played as a goalkeeper in the 1940s. Abid also represented the Ceylon XI on multiple occasions.

== Early life and playing career ==
Abid was educated at St. Anthony's College, Kandy, where he earned his school colours in association football. From 1944 onwards, he played regularly for Harlequins Sports Club. Establishing himself as one of the club’s leading goalkeepers.

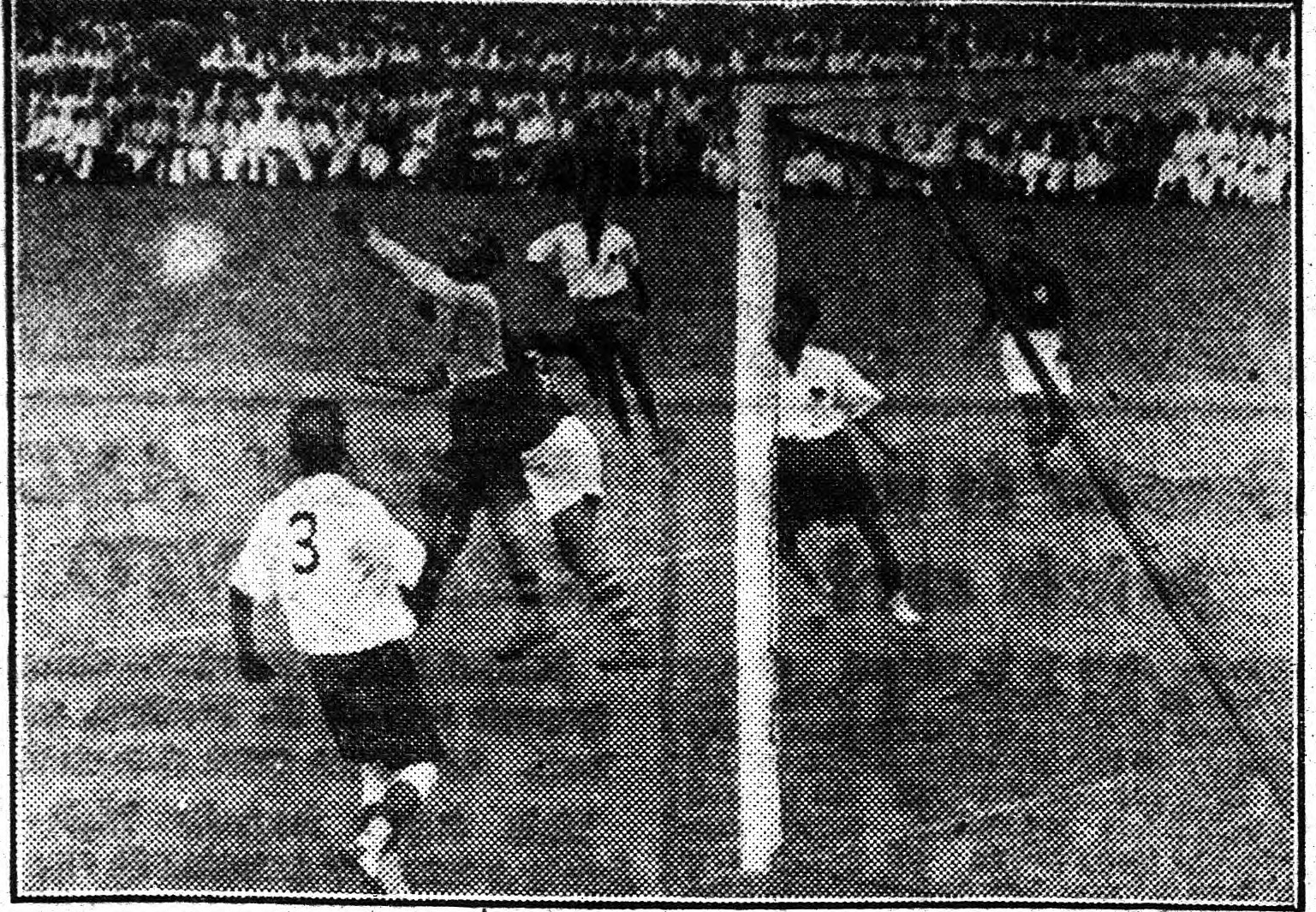
Abid punting the ball away, in. match against the visiting Jinnah Gymkhana.

During his career, Abid helped Harlequins S.C. secure several major domestic titles, including the Colombo Association Football League, City League, and De Mel League championships. He also captained the side on numerous occasions, serving as team skipper during some of its most successful seasons. At representative level, Abid played for the City League XI against a touring team from the All India Football Federation. Later that year, in November, he earned his Ceylon national team cap, representing Ceylon in a series of matches against Jinnah Gymkhana, appearing in all the tests.

He also represented the Colombo Central Colours, who finished as runners-up in domestic inter-league competition.

== Death ==
On October 15 1950, Abid who went to bathe, alongside several friends, was caught in a strong current and swept out to sea. One companion attempted a rescue but also encountered difficulties, while others raised an alarm. Although Abid’s friend was brought ashore, Abid himself disappeared. Police were notified and conducted a search, but recovery efforts were hindered by heavy seas.

Abid’s body was discovered floating near the Bambalapitiya railway station the following morning and was taken to the police mortuary at Wellawatte. An inquest was held at the Wellawatte Police Station by J. N. C. Tiruchelvam, the City Coroner. The death was recorded as an accidental drowning. His funeral was held later the same day at Katugastota.
