= Muhammad Ramzan Jr. =

Pakistani former footballer

Personal information
- Full name: Muhammad Ramzan Jr.
- Date of birth: Unknown
- Place of birth: British India
- Date of death: Unknown
- Position: Goalkeeper

Senior career*
Years	Team	Apps	(Gls)
1940s–1950s	Keamari Union		

International career
1952	Pakistan		
- * Club domestic league appearances and goals

Muhammad Ramzan Jr. was a Pakistani footballer who played as a goalkeeper. Ramzan played and served as the vice-captain for the Pakistan national team for their participation in the 1952 Asian Quadrangular Football Tournament.

== Club career ==
Ramzan spent his career playing for the Keamari Union throughout the 1940s and 1950s, captaining the side on several occasions. Ramzan also represented the Karachi football team at the National Football Championship.

== International career ==
In 1952, Ramzan was selected to represent the Pakistan national team for the 1952 Asian Quadrangular Football Tournament which was held in Ceylon. He also served as the vice-captain of the team. The same year, Ramzan also played in an unofficial exhibition match against a Badulla District XI.
