= Muhammad Ramzan Sr. =

Pakistani former footballer

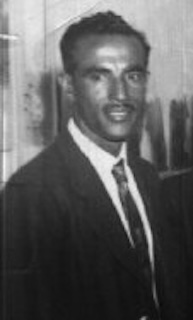
- Ramzan in 1952

Personal information
- Full name: Muhammad Ramzan Hussain
- Place of birth: Karachi, British India
- Position: Defender

Senior career*
Years	Team	Apps	(Gls)
1948–1950s	Mohammedan Sporting		

International career
1950–1952	Pakistan		
- * Club domestic league appearances and goals

Muhammad Ramzan Hussain (Urdu: محمد رمضان حسین), also known as Ramzan Sr., was a Pakistani footballer who played as a defender. He represented the Pakistan national team in their international debut in 1950, and the 1952 Asian Quadrangular Football Tournament.

== Club career ==
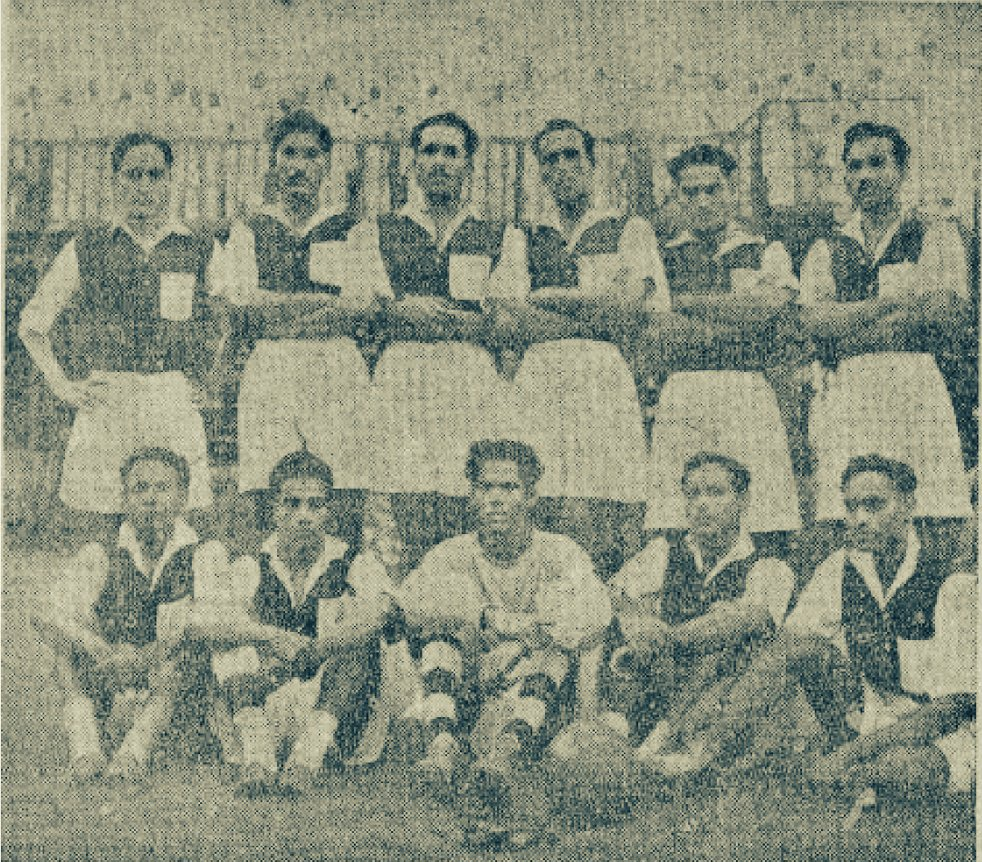
Ramzan (third from right, standing) with Mohammedan Sporting in 1948.

Ramzan played for the Mohammedan Sporting Club in the 1950s. Notably, Ramzan played a crucial role in the team's success in 1948, the season where Mohammedan Sporting became the first Indian club to win Calcutta League without losing a single match. Playing 24 matches, winning 20 and drawing the rest four. The same year, Ramzan, alongside teammate Dad Muhammad, were selected to represent an I.F.A. XI against the visiting Burma football team.

Ramzan also represented the Sindh football team in 1950, and later the Karachi football team at the National Football Championship.

== International career ==
In 1950, Ramzan was part of the Pakistan national football team which toured Iran and Iraq. Two years later, Ramzan represented the Pakistan national team at the 1952 Asian Quadrangular Football Tournament, held in Colombo, Ceylon. In the tournament, he featured as a starter in all the matches Pakistan played. The same year, he featured for Pakistan against the Iran national team during their tour to Pakistan.
