= Taj Mohammad Sr. =

Indian footballer (born 1924)

Taj Mohammad
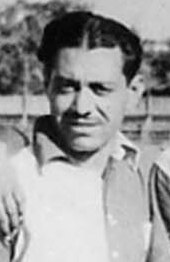
- Taj with East Bengal in 1949

Personal information
- Full name: Taj Mohammad Sr.
- Date of birth: 1924
- Place of birth: Killa Batezai, Quetta district, British India (now in Pishin district, Pakistan)
- Date of death: Unknown
- Place of death: Pakistan
- Position: Defender

Youth career
- Prince Club Quetta

Senior career*
Years	Team	Apps	(Gls)
1940	Hazara Club Quetta		
1940	Sandemanians Club		
1940–1947	Kolkata Mohammedan		
1946–1948	Bhawanipore Club		
1949	East Bengal		
1950s	Muslim Club Quetta		
1950s	Afghan Club Quetta		
1950s	Raiders		
1957–??	North-Western Railway		

International career
1948–1949	India	3	(0)
- * Club domestic league appearances and goals

Taj Mohammad (Pashto: تاج محمد; born 1924) also known as Taj Lala or Taj Senior, was a footballer who played as a defender. Born in the Quetta district in the Baluchistan Agency in British India (present-day Pakistan), he represented India during the 1948 Summer Olympics.

== Early life ==
Belonging to the Tareen tribe of ethnic Pashtuns, Mohammad was born in 1924 in Killa Batezai in the Quetta district (modern-day Pishin district) of Baluchistan Agency of British India.

== Club career ==
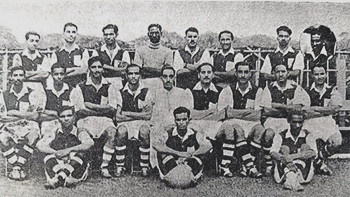
Mohammad (extreme left, standing row) with Kolkata Mohammedan in 1942.

Mohammad started his youth career with Prince Club of Quetta, where he played for 6 years. In 1940, he toured Lucknow with the Hazara Club and represented the Sandemanians Club in the Rovers Cup in Bombay. He was eventually recruited by Kolkata Mohammedan where he formed a formidable defence along with Balochistan fellow Jumma Khan.

In 1946, the Mysore Football Association alleged three players, including Mohammad, along with Ismail Jan and Osman Jan, had played in Quetta the year before. This was a contradiction to Rule 33, which stated that a player can also play for a home club while playing in the Calcutta League. All three players were suspended for two months.

Mohammad also joined Bhawanipore Club in Calcutta. He played for East Bengal in 1949 at Calcutta Football League.

Following the partition, Mohammad moved to Pakistan where he played for several clubs, including Muslim Club of Quetta, Afghan Club, Moghuls, and Karachi Kickers. In 1955, he toured India with Karachi Kickers and the next year went on tour to Tehran with Hazara Club Quetta. He represented Balochistan in the National Football Championship. And also played for Raiders for their participation in the Rovers Cup. Towards the end of his career, Taj joined North-Western Railway in 1957, where he'd play till the rest of his career.

== International career ==
Mohammad competed in the men's tournament at the 1948 Summer Olympics with the India national team. The following year, he toured Ceylon with India, playing in several matches against local sides, including two friendly matches against Ceylon.

After representing India at international level, he migrated back to his hometown in Pakistan. (Note: Although some sources erroneously indicate that Taj Mohammad Sr. represented the Pakistan national football team later on, this is not the case. Taj Mohammad Jr. also hailing from Quetta represented Pakistan including during their international debut in 1950.)

== Post-retirement ==
After his retirement from the game, Mohammad worked in a government school where he retired in 1975. He spent his later life in abject poverty. The Taj Lala Football Stadium in Pishin is named after him.

== Honours ==
Bengal

- Santosh Trophy: 1945–46, 1949–50

East Bengal

- IFA Shield: 1949
- Calcutta Football League: 1949
- Rovers Cup: 1949

== See also ==
- List of Indian football players in foreign leagues

== Bibliography ==
- Kapadia, Novy (2017). Barefoot to Boots: The Many Lives of Indian Football. Penguin Random House. ISBN 978-0-143-42641-7.
- Martinez, Dolores; Mukharjiim, Projit B (2009). Football: From England to the World: The Many Lives of Indian Football. Routledge. ISBN 978-1-138-88353-6. Archived from the original on 2 July 2022.
- Majumdar, Boria; Bandyopadhyay, Kausik (2006). A Social History Of Indian Football: Striving To Score. Routledge. ISBN 9780415348355. Archived from the original on 29 June 2021.
- Basu, Jaydeep (2003). Stories from Indian Football. UBS Publishers' Distributors. ISBN 9788174764546. Archived from the original on 11 October 2022.
- Nath, Nirmal (2011). History of Indian Football: Upto 2009–10. Readers Service. ISBN 9788187891963. Archived from the original on 22 July 2022.
