= Peter Ranasinghe =

Sri Lankan footballer (c. 1933–2022)

- Peter during his playing days

Personal information
- Full name: Peter Ranasinghe
- Date of birth: c. 1933
- Place of birth: Colombo, British Ceylon (present-day Sri Lanka)
- Date of death: 17 November 2022 (aged 88)
- Place of death: Perth, Australia
- Position: Center-back

Youth career
- –1951: St. Joseph's College

Senior career*
Years	Team	Apps	(Gls)
1951–	University of Ceylon		
1955–1956	Colombo Central Colours		
1958–?	Old Joes SC		

International career
1953–1963	Ceylon		
- * Club domestic league appearances and goals

Peter Ranasinghe (Sinhala: පීටර් රණසිංහ; c. 1933 – 17 November 2022) was a Sri Lankan football player who primarily played as a defender. He was captain of the Sri Lanka national team on numerous occasions.

== Early life ==
Ranasinghe, an alumnus of St. Joseph's College, Colombo, excelled in soccer alongside his brother Christopher. Both eventually played for the Ceylon national team. Their father, also a soccer player, worked as a Forest Department officer and lived near the Government Services Ground. Peter participated in Inter-College Football Tournaments, playing as a center-back, occasionally contributing to attacking plays. He also played for the basketball team of St. Joseph's.

== Club career ==
Peter graduated from the University of Ceylon and began representing the Old Joes Sports Club, where he won the CFA Cup by defeating Cargills at the Colombo Oval in 1958. He played in midfield alongside national players like Durand Perera, Bagoos Saldin, K.M. Thomas, and Anton Mariyadasan. Eventually, he led Old Joes at the Gold Cup floodlit tournament final against Saunders SC, which finished in a controversial draw. Earlier, he successfully led the Colombo Central Colours team to win the prestigious Inter-District Championship in 1955 and 1956, organized by the Ceylon Football Association. One of his final contributions to football came in the early 1970s when he led the Nugegoda League Team against a Combined XI during an exhibition match at the Mirihana Police Ground.

== International career ==
Peter made his debut for the Ceylon national team during the 1953 Asian Quadrangular Football Tournament in Rangoon, Burma, under the captaincy of T.H. Soono. He later captained the team during the 1954 Asian Quadrangular Football Tournament in Calcutta, India, playing as a central defender. Ceylon tied 1–1 with eventual champions India and secured their first-ever international victory by defeating Burma 2–1, finishing as tournament runners-up. In the 1955 Asian Quadrangular Football Tournament, Peter continued as captain, playing in a more advanced position. He scored two goals against India in a 3–4 defeat and a free kick goal in a 1–2 loss to Pakistan, with Ceylon finishing at the bottom of the points table. Peter also led the Ceylon team in the 1964 Summer Olympics qualifiers against India over two legs.

== Personal life ==
In 1956, he became an Assistant Lecturer at the University of Ceylon, left for the UK on a Federation of British Industries Scholarship in February 1958, and returned in 1959. He represented the Colombo Commercial Company of the Mercantile League Football Tournament, the company he served as an engineer, later promoted to the rank of Director before he migrated to Australia in 1961.

== Death ==
On November 17, 2022, Peter died at his residence in Perth, Australia.

== Career statistics ==
=== International goals ===
Scores and results list Pakistan's goal tally first, score column indicates score after each Ranasinghe goal.

List of international goals scored by Peter Ranasinghe
No.	Date	Venue	Opponent	Score	Result	Competition	Ref.
1	18 December 1955	Dacca Stadium, Dhaka, East Pakistan	India		3–4	1955 Asian Quadrangular Football Tournament	
2	18 December 1955	Dacca Stadium, Dhaka, East Pakistan	India		3–4	1955 Asian Quadrangular Football Tournament	
3	21 December 1955	Dacca Stadium, Dhaka, East Pakistan	Pakistan	1–2	1–2	1955 Asian Quadrangular Football Tournament	
4	26 August 1956	Government Services Ground, Colombo, Ceylon	Pakistan	1–2	3–5	Friendly	
5	26 August 1956	Government Services Ground, Colombo, Ceylon	Pakistan	2–2	3–5	Friendly	
6	1 September 1956	Government Services Ground, Colombo, Ceylon	Pakistan	1–0	2–2	Friendly	
