= Sheoo Mewalal =

Indian footballer (1926–2008)

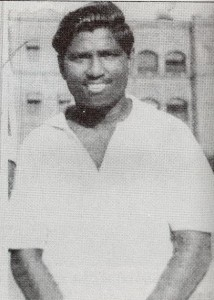

Personal information
- Full name: Sheoo Mewalal
- Date of birth: 1 July 1926
- Place of birth: Daulatpur, British India
- Date of death: 27 December 2008 (aged 82)
- Place of death: Kolkata, India
- Position: Striker

Youth career
- Morning Star Club
- Napier Club

Senior career*
Years	Team	Apps	(Gls)
	George Telegraph	?	(?)
1938–?	Kiddirpore	?	(?)
1945–1946	Aryan	?	(?)
1946–1947	Mohun Bagan	?	(?)
1947–1955	Eastern Railway	?	(90+)
1956–1957	Aryan	?	(?)
1958	Bengal Nagpur Railway		

International career
1946	India XI		
1948–1955	India	10	(7)

Managerial career
- 1977: India
Medal record
Men's football
Representing India
Asian Games
Gold medal – first place	1951 New Delhi	Team
- * Club domestic league appearances and goals

Sheoo Mewalal (also known as Sahu Mewalal; 1 July 1926 – 27 December 2008) was an Indian footballer in Kolkata. He played as a striker and was known for his fitness, bicycle kicks, and goal-scoring abilities, especially using the rabona kick.

Mewalal's playing career with a reported 1032 goals along with 32 hat-tricks in both the official and exhibition matches, was ended in 1958 due to an injury.

== Childhood and early career ==
Mewalal was born in Daulatpur in Chitarghati Panchayat of the Gaya district (now Nawada district) in Bihar, to Sahoo Mahadeoram and Kusumi Devi. He spent his early days playing football with the seeds of a tar tree near the banks of the Khuri River, which flows through his village.

In 1937, his family moved to Calcutta (now Kolkata). His father worked at Fort William, and the family resided in the Fort William and Hastings neighborhoods. Once in Calcutta, Mewalel's footballing talent was noticed by Sergeant Barnett who helped him join the Morning Star Club. Barnett would become his first coach. Known for his ability to shoot with both feet, Mewalal credited Sergeant R. Blackey for helping him learn the technique. Earlier coached by Bagha Som, he began playing as a right-in and was eventually urged by the club to play in the center-forward position, considering his physique and ball-shooting technique.

He began playing for the Napier Club the following year. He made his name at the club after scoring an important goal in a draw against Grear Sporting Club. Mewalal also represented Bengal in Santosh Trophy and played alongside Sailen Manna, and won the tournament in 1953–54 season, in which he scored a goal in their 3–1 win against Mysore in final. Managed by Balaidas Chatterjee, Bengal won multiple Santosh Trophy titles during that time, and Mewalal scored all total 39 goals for the team.

== Club career ==
Mewalal started his senior career in 1938 with Kidderpore SC which was then playing in the 2nd Division of the Calcutta Football League. He came into the limelight in 1944 when he scored the winning goal for the IFA XI against India XI. In 1945, he joined the 1st Division club Aryans, one of the oldest clubs in the country. It was his hat-trick for Aryans in the same year against Mohun Bagan A.C. in a Calcutta league match that impressed the then Mohun Bagan captain Sailen Manna. Mewalal also appeared with another Calcutta Football League side George Telegraph.

In 1946, he joined Mohun Bagan and played under captaincy of Manna. In 1947, he joined the Eastern Railway Football Club. After spending eight years with them, he joined BNR Football Club. In 1958, while playing in an Inter-Railway tournament in Kharagpur, he broke his knee. This incident ended Mewalal's illustrious 20-year career.

During his club career, Mewalel scored more than 150 goals in the local league. He also scored 39 goals—including five hat-tricks—for BNR in the Santosh Trophy competition. Mewalal was the top scorer in the Calcutta Football League on four occasions. He achieved this feat in 1949, 1951, 1953 and 1954 for Eastern Railways and in 1958 for BNR, scoring 32, 18, 11, 19, and 16 goals respectively. He also scored a record of 32 hat-tricks in local football tournaments, a record unbroken to this day. Mewalal scored 1032 goals in his career, in official and unofficial games.

== International career ==
=== Pre-partition ===
In 1946, while playing for Mohun Bagan, Mewalal was selected to represent an India XI on their tour to South Africa.

=== Post-partition ===
Playing for the India national team, Mewalal's first major tournament was the 1948 Summer Olympics in London. As part of the preparation for Olympics, he went to Europe with the national team in July, that won matches against English teams like Pinner F.C., Hayes F.C. and Alexandra Park FC. In the Olympics, Indian team managed by Balaidas Chatterjee, went down 1–2 to France. Following the Olympics, the Talimeren Ao led team played exhibition games, winning a game against the Dutch club AFC Ajax 5–1. He emerged as the top scorer in these games. Mewalal became part of the prominent Indian team during the "golden era" of Indian football, managed by Hyderabad City Police head coach Syed Abdul Rahim, became one of the best teams in Asia.

In March 1951, at the inaugural 1951 Asian Games in New Delhi, he finished as the top scorer with four goals, with India winning the gold medal. Mewalal and his team defeated Iran 1–0 in the gold medal match to gain their first trophy. He was also a part of the team that competed at the 1952 Summer Olympics in Helsinki. He was also part of the national team that toured to several European countries in the late 1940s and played against teams like Denmark, Austria, Switzerland, in which he netted six goals. He later participated in the team's tours of Bangladesh, Afghanistan, Myanmar, and Thailand during the 1950s.

In 1952, Mewalel represented the India football team at the 1952 Asian Quadrangular Football Tournament, where he found the net twice against Ceylon. In the following match, he became first player after independence to score a hat-trick for India in a 4–0 victory over Burma. Finishing the campaign as the top goal-scorer with four goals. He was also selected for the 1955 Asian Quadrangular Football Tournament, where he scored a goal against Ceylon in a 4–3 victory.

== Managerial career ==
In the mid-1970s, Mewalal became interim manager of India national football team and guided them achieving third place in 1977 King's Cup. He also worked as a trainer in the coaching camp formed by Russa United Club in Tollygunge in the 1990s.

== Personal life ==
Mewalal married Laxmi Devi Lal in 1944 at the age of 18. They had three children together.

He was admitted to a Kolkata hospital on 14 November 2008 after suffering from pneumonia. Diagnosed with a gallstone, he was again admitted on 8 December and was operated upon on 19 December, after which he was placed on a liquid diet. He died on 27 December.

== Honours ==
=== Player ===
India

- Asian Games Gold medal:
  - Winners (1): 1951
- Asian Quadrangular Football Tournament:
  - Winners (2): 1952, 1955

Mohun Bagan

- IFA Shield:
  - Winners (1): 1947

Bengal

- Santosh Trophy:
  - Winners (4): 1947–48, 1949–50, 1950–51, 1951-52, 1953–54

Aryan

- IFA Shield:
  - Runners-up (1): 1956

Individual

- Most goals at the Asian Games: 1951 (3 goals)
- Calcutta Football League top goal-scorer:
  - 1949 (32 goals),
  - 1951 (18 goals),
  - 1953 (11 goals),
  - 1954 (19 goals),
  - 1958 (16 goals)

=== Manager ===
India

- King's Cup third place: 1977

== See also ==
- History of Indian football
- List of India national football team hat-tricks
- List of India national football team managers
- History of the India national football team
- India national football team at the Olympics
