= Jinnah Gymkhana FC =

Pakistani football club

Jinnah Gymkhana football team was an association football club based in Karachi. The football team is part of the wider multi-sports Jinnah Gymkhana Club, which also included a hockey team.

During the 1940s, The team was a strong enough to tour other countries and play their international sides. In 1949, the team toured Burma (current day Myanmar) and Ceylon (current day Sri Lanka). One game was attended by Burmese Cabinet Ministers. In Ceylon, it beat the national side in an unofficial test. One match was opened by the Ceylon Prime Minister, D. S. Senanayake.

== History ==
=== Formation and early years ===
The team was formed with the involvement of Rashid Tabassum, a Muslim League loyalist who was also involved with various hockey and football associations.

In 1946, the team won the All-Pakistan Ataturk Soccer Tournament. In early 1947, the team played a match against the touring Afghan Sporting Club from Kabul at the Feroze Shah Kotla Ground in Delhi. The match was attended by Muhammad Ali Jinnah along with his sister, Liaquat Ali Khan, and other members of the Muslim League including Ghazanfar Ali Khan and I.I. Chundrigar.

=== 1949 Tours ===
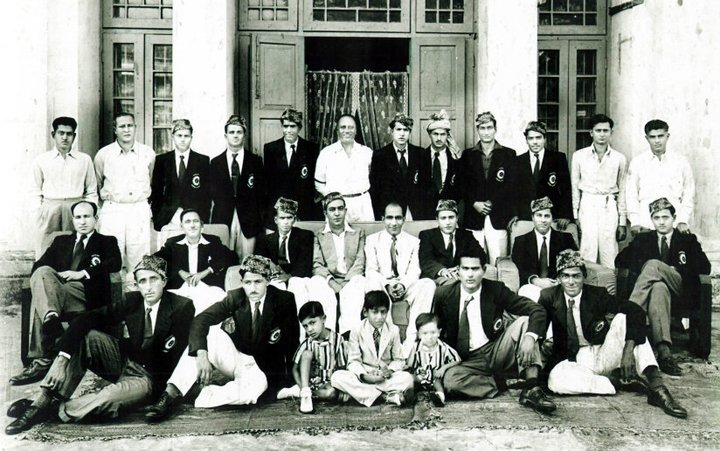
Jinnah Gymkhana team in 1949

In late 1949, the team toured Burma and Ceylon for nine-weeks. The team consisted of seventeen players who mostly had all-India or Inter-provincial appearances to their names. They were captained by S. A. Samad Jr., who previously played for Mohammedan Sporting and also served as the assistant manager on their tour. The team was managed by Rashid Tabassum, who was the Associate Secretary of the Pakistan Football Federation and Honorary General Secretary of the club. The club also included several Pakistan national team players such as Abdul Wahid Durrani, Dad Muhammad, Ismail Jan, Ahmed Ali Phullo, Mohammad Kassim, and Taj Mohammad Jr. These players would go on to represent Pakistan in several tournaments in the later years.

Tour to Burma

The team visited Rangoon, Burma in November of 1949. They played three matches held in Rangoon, the Burma Selected XI managed to defeat the team once, the second game against the Combined Burma XI resulted in a 1–1 draw with Abdul Wahid Durrani equalizing seven minutes before the end. Their third match also resulted in a draw. On 10 November, where Jinnah Gymkhana club lost by three goals to the Burmese Selected XI. Their match on 5 November drew a capacity crowd and was attended by the Pakistani Ambassador to the Burma as well as several Burmese Ministers. After the conclusion of the Burma tour, a local player of one of the teams accompanied the squad to Colombo. The player, Wasay, who was a Burmese army officer who was travelling to Aldershot. Boarded the same ship with the team, even playing with the squad in Colombo, putting up a strong partnership with fellow defender Samad.

Tour to Ceylon

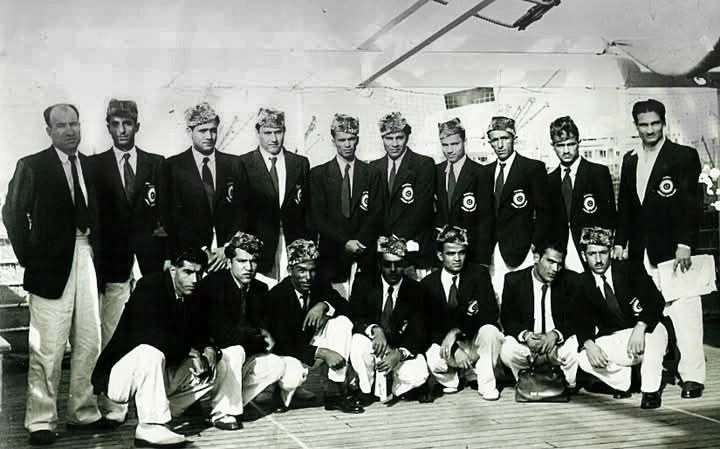
Jinnah Gymkhana Club when they arrived in Ceylon.

After the tour to Burma the club decided to play games in Ceylon. The team left Rangoon on November 21 and arrived in Colombo on November 25. The team consisted of 17 players.

Jinnah Gymkhana club played a Ceylon Football Association team on 26 November; the tourist won 4-3. They faced the City League XI on 27 November where both teams drew by nil. The next match was against Ceylon, where both teams met on two occasions, on 28 November and 29 November, where the team beat them by four goals to nil, with Kassim scoring a hat-trick and a goal by Afzal. On 1 December 1949, the visitors lost to Kandy XI by two goals, with Mustapha scoring their only goal of the game. The following day, the team played another match against Ceylon, where they defeated the latter from a goal by Taj Mohammad Jr.. The team was feted at Kandy where several receptions were held for them.

Jinnah Gymkhana played another match against Ceylon on 3 December 1949, where they won by a goal from Samshaud. The game was opened with remarks by Ceylon's Prime Minister, D. S. Senenayake. In their final match of the tour on 4 December, the team defeated Colombo City League XI by 5–1.

=== Later years ===
In 1955, It was decided that the team would play a number of exhibition matches in countries such as Singapore, Malaya and Burma. However, It is unclear whether the team actually toured the countries to play these matches.

In 1961, the club participated in the "Aly Khan Gold Cup", held at the YMCA Ground.

In 2003, the team featured in several tournaments in Karachi.
