= Ahmed Ali Phullo =

Pakistani former footballer

Ahmed Ali
Personal information
- Full name: Ahmed Ali Phullo
- Place of birth: Quetta, British India
- Positions: Midfielder; right half

Senior career*
Years	Team	Apps	(Gls)
1946–1948	Quetta Mohammadan		
1949–??	Muslim FC Quetta		

International career
1950–1954	Pakistan		
- * Club domestic league appearances and goals

Ahmed Ali (Urdu: احمد علی), known by his nickname Phullo, was a Pakistani footballer who played as a midfielder. Ahmed was among the most prominent players of the Pakistan national football team in the 1950s.

== Club career ==
Ahmed played for the Quetta Mohammadan SC team in the 1940s, also captaining the team from 1946 till 1948. He then joined Muslim FC Quetta, becoming captain of the club in 1952. Ahmed was also part of the Jinnah Gymkhana team that toured Burma and Ceylon in 1949.

He represented the Balochistan football team selection at the National Football Championship from 1948 till the 1950s.

== International career ==
In 1950, Ahmad was selected to represent the Pakistan national team for their tour to Iran and Iraq. Three years later, Ahmed played at the 1953 Asian Quadrangular Football Tournament.

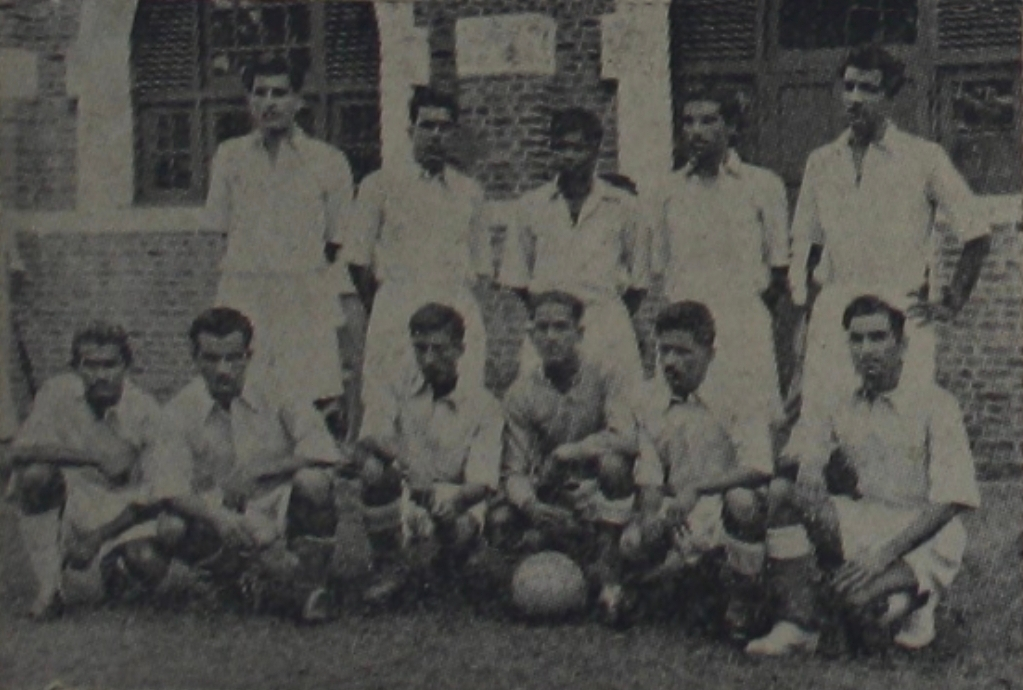
Ahmed (sitting second from left) with Pakistan in 1953.

In 1954, he was also selected for Pakistan to represent the team at the 1954 Asian Games, where he served as the vice-captain. He played both group stage matches against Singapore and Burma.

== See also ==
- List of Pakistan national football team captains
