= 1955 Asian Quadrangular Football Tournament =

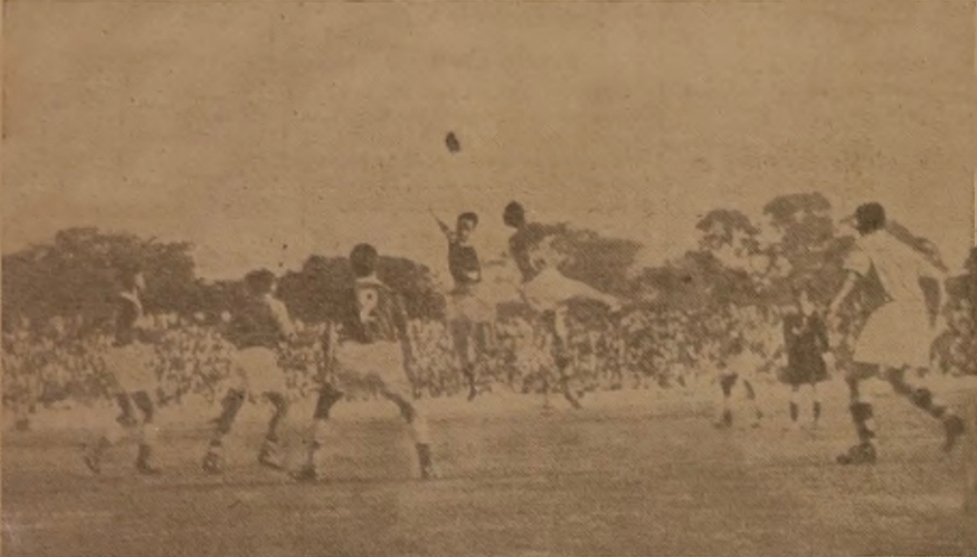
- Pakistan versus Burma on 17 December

Tournament details
- Host country: East Pakistan (now Bangladesh)
- Dates: 17–24 December 1955
- Teams: 4 (from 1 confederation)
- Venue: 1 (in 1 host city)

Final positions
- Champions: India (4th title)
- Runners-up: Pakistan
- Third place: Burma

Tournament statistics
- Matches played: 6
- Goals scored: 30 (5 per match)
- Top scorer: (India) Pradip Kumar Banerjee (5 goals)

The 1955 Asian Quadrangular Football Tournament was the last edition of the Asian Quadrangular Football Tournament to take place. It was held in Dacca (now Dhaka), East Pakistan (now Bangladesh) and won by India for a record 4th time.

== Squads ==
Ceylon	Pakistan
Muzammil Hassimdeen; G. Amarasinghe; A. C. M. Khan; D. M. Panditha; T. H. Soono; T. Ramasamy; Peter Ranasinghe (captain); K. A. Premadasa; Leo Cornelius; T. S. Jaymon; T. S. Sainoon; T. M. Deen; K. D. Somapala; Dennis Peiris; Andrew Fernando; Tom Ossen; Karunapala Fernando	Zafar Ali Lodhi; Moideen Kutty; Jamil Akhtar; Sumbal Khan; Riasat Ali; Nabi Chowdhury; Taj Mohammad Jr.; Ibrar Hussain Bali; Nasir; Abdul Majid; Anwar; Sher Shah; Qayyum Changezi; Muhammad Abdul Malik; Muhammad Amin; Moosa Ghazi; Abdur Rahim; Fazlur Rahman Arzu

== Points Table ==
Pos	Team	Pld	W	D	L	GF	GA	GD	Pts	Final result
1	India	3	3	0	0	11	6	+5	6	Champions
2	Pakistan	3	2	0	1	7	5	+2	4	
3	Burma	3	1	0	2	7	10	−3	2	
4	Ceylon	3	0	0	3	5	9	−4	0	

Source: RSSSF

== Matches ==
All the results are based on data from rsssf

17 December 1955

Pakistan	4–2	Burma
Qayyum 10', 50' (pen.), 55' (pen.); Jamil 56'		Suk Bahadur 44'; Kyaw Zan

Dacca Stadium, Dacca

18 December 1955

India	4–3	Ceylon
Banerjee 30' (?); Mewalal; Sattar	Report	Ranasinghe 2' (?); Fernando

Dacca Stadium, Dacca

20 December 1955

India	5–2	Burma
Banerjee (?); D'Souza (?); Kempaiah	Report	Suk Bahadur; Aung Shein

Dacca Stadium, Dacca

21 December 1955

Pakistan	2–1	Ceylon
Fakhri (?)	Report	Ranasinghe

Dacca Stadium, Dacca
Attendance: 20,000

23 December 1955

Burma	3–1	Ceylon
Suk Bahadur (?); Aung Myint	Report	Sainoon

Dacca Stadium, Dacca

24 December 1955

Pakistan	1–2	India
Fakhri	Report	Banerjee 13'; D'Souza 29'

Dacca Stadium, Dacca
Attendance: 50,000

== Statistics ==
=== Goalscorers ===
There were 30 goals scored in 6 matches, for an average of 5 goals per match.

5 goals

- (India) Pradip Kumar Banerjee

4 goals

- (Myanmar) Suk Bahadur

3 goals

- (Pakistan) Qayyum Changezi
- (Dominion of Ceylon) Peter Ranasinghe
- (India) Neville D'Souza
- (Pakistan) Masood Fakhri

1 goal

- (Pakistan) Jamil Akhtar
- (Myanmar) Kyaw Zan
- (India) Sheoo Mewalal
- (India) Mohammad Abdus Sattar
- (Dominion of Ceylon) Andrew Fernando
- (India) Mariappa Kempaiah
- (Myanmar) Aung Myint
- (Myanmar) Aung Shein
- (Dominion of Ceylon) M. Sainoon
