= Keamari Union FC =

Pakistani football club

Keamari Union
- Full name: Keamari Union Football Club
- Short name: KMUN
- Founded: 1904; 122 years ago

Keamari Union Football Club is a football club based in Keamari, Karachi, Pakistan. Founded in 1904, it is one of the oldest football clubs in Pakistan. The club was prominent in Karachi football during the 1950s, winning multiple regional tournaments and finishing runners-up at the 1954 Rovers Cup in India.

== History ==
=== Early days (1900s–1930s) ===
Founded in 1904, it is one of the oldest football clubs in Pakistan.

In March 1932, the team lost against the Royal Air Force team in the semifinals of the Eduljee Dinshaw Football Tournament. In the 1930s, the team also competed at the YMCA Cup in Karachi.

=== Success (1950s) ===
From the 1950s, the team already started competing in the Karachi First Division Football League.

In 1950, the team won the Raiders All-Pakistan Football Tournament in Lahore, with the services of Pakistan international players such as Osman Jan, the first ever captain of the national team, and Muhammad Ramzan Sr.. The team also had services of international players such as left winger Ibrahim. In May 1950, the team won the Invitation Soccer Cup in Karachi after defeating Pak Moghals in the final. In May 1951, the team again won the Raiders All-Pakistan Football Tournament after defeating Rangers FC in the final.

In 1954, the team participated at the 1954 Rovers Cup in India, notably defeating Mohun Bagan in the semi-finals. The club finished runners-up after losing by 1–2 to Hyderabad Police in the final. During the tournament, Keamari Union player and international striker Muhammad Umer scored eight goals in a single game in a 9–0 victory over an Indian team.

In 1955, the team again featured at the Rovers Cup in India, however the team failed to qualify to the knockout round.

In 1957, the team won the Haji Aboobakar Football Tournament after defeating Karachi Port Trust in the final.

=== Later years ===
In July 1963, Keamari Union was one of the teams to play an exhibition match against a British touring football team stationed in Karachi. In the 1960s, the team competed in the Sheikh Mohammad Ismail Gold Shield Football Tournament held in Multan.

On 20 September 2004, the team lost by 1–6 against Karachi United in an exhibition match.

== Rivalries ==
The team shares a rivalry with Karachi based club Baloch Eleven. In 1956, in a match between the two teams, the pavilion of the KMC Stadium collapsed with close to 100 people getting injured.

== Honours ==
- Rovers Cup
  - Runners-up: 1954
