= Osman Jan =

Pakistani footballer

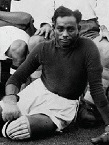
- Osman in 1937

Personal information
- Date of birth: Unknown
- Place of birth: Unknown (Note: Some sources state he was from Mombasa, East Africa Protectorate, while others state he was from New Delhi.)
- Date of death: Unknown
- Place of death: Karachi, Pakistan
- Height: 5 ft 6 in (1.68 m)
- Position: Goalkeeper

Youth career
- Delhi Crescent Club

Senior career*
Years	Team	Apps	(Gls)
1935–1939	Kolkata Mohammedan		
1930s–1940s	Aryan		
1940s–1950s	Keamari Union		

International career
1946	India XI		
1950	Pakistan	1	(0)
- * Club domestic league appearances and goals

Osman Jan (Urdu: عثمان جان) was a Pakistani footballer who played as a goalkeeper. Jan is regarded as one of the greatest goalkeepers in the Indian subcontinent during the 1930s and 1940s. With a short height measuring 5'6", Jan was praised for his long-range leap and a powerful fist. He was also renowned for his outfield play mind and one-on-one situations.

He was part of the Calcutta League dominant side Mohammedan Sporting in the 1930s. He also played for Aryan FC. Osman represented Bengal and Delhi in the Santosh Trophy and was the first footballer to win the Santosh Trophy for two different states.

Osman was appointed captain of the Pakistan national team in their international debut in 1950, and became the first ever captain in the country's history.

== Club career ==
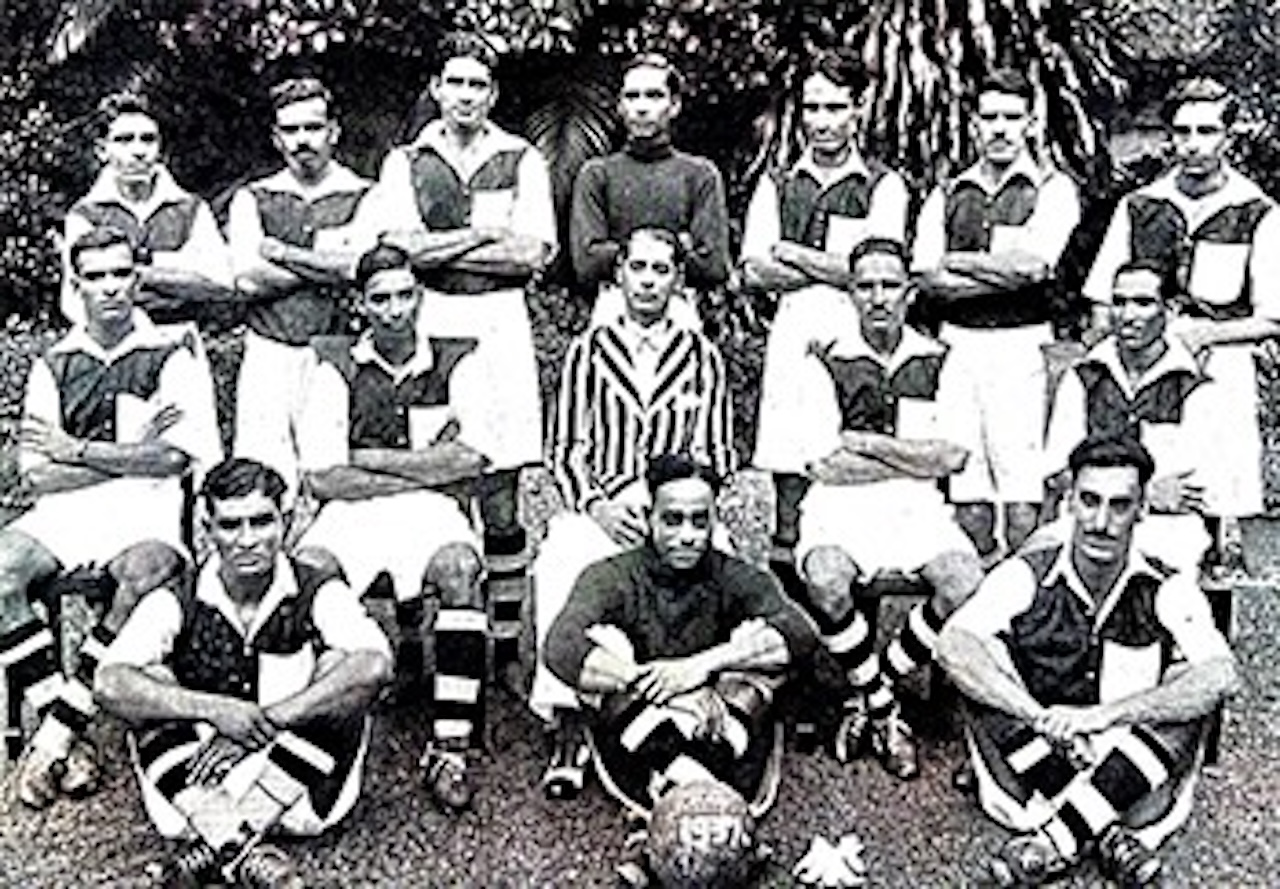
Osman sitting in middle with the 1937 Calcutta League winning Kolkata Mohammedan team

Initially playing for Delhi Crescent Club, Osman was recruited by Mohammedan Sporting in 1935. He further became a key player during the club's dominance Calcutta League in the 1930s. He also featured at the IFA Shield. He won the inaugural edition of the Santosh Trophy with Bengal in 1941.

Osman's return to Delhi, after successful stints at Mohammedan Sporting and Aryan FC in Kolkata helped build a strong Delhi team. Under his captaincy, Delhi achieved an unexpected triumph in the 1944 Santosh Trophy, defeating all time champions Bengal 2–0 in the final. This victory remains Delhi's sole triumph in the National Football Championship.

In 1946, the Mysore Football Association alleged three players, including Osman, along with Taj Mohammad Sr. and Ismail Jan, had played in Quetta the year before. This was a contradiction to Rule 33, which stated that a player can also play for a home club while playing in the Calcutta League. All three players were suspended for two months.

After the partition of India, Osman went over to Pakistan where he represented Sindh at the National Football Championship. He also helped Keamari Union club to win All-Pakistan trophy in Lahore. On 29 April 1950, Osman was included as guest in the squad of Heroes Club from Peshawar for a tour to Iran in May.

== International career ==
In 1937, when the Islington Corinthians XI was touring British India, Osman was selected for the All-India XI, where he was praised for his defensive abilities in goal.

In 1946, he was selected for an Indian XI to tour South Africa.

Osman was appointed captain of the Pakistan national team in their international debut during a trip to Iran and Iraq in October 1950.

Osman made his debut in Pakistan's first ever international match on 27 October 1950 against Iran in the Amjadiyeh Stadium in Teheran. Reportedly the Pakistan national team played the match barefoot, which was the norm in South Asia at the time. Pakistan also engaged in unofficial friendly matches during the tour, defeating Tehran's Taj FC (now Esteghlal FC) with a 6–1 scoreline and drawing 2–2 against a team from Isfahan.

In Iraq, due to the Iraqi FA's inability to gather a full national team, Pakistan played an unofficial friendly against the club Haris al-Maliki resulting in a 1–1 draw at Baghdad in front of a 10,000 crowd, playing once again barefoot, with the heroics of Osman keeping Pakistan from losing in the dying minutes of the game.

== Playing style ==
Osman Jan was considered one of the earliest players to be termed as the sweeper-keeper role in Indian football. He was known for frequently moving outside his penalty area to collect the ball and initiate attacks, often launching long passes toward the centre-half to begin forward moves.

== Post-retirement ==
On 4 July 1951, Osman was appointed as coach of the Pakistan Air Force football team on behalf of the Pakistan Football Federation. On 17 November 1961, Osman was appointed as member of the selection committee of the Karachi Division football team for the National Football Championship.

After his death, a tournament was started in his memory in Karachi.

== Honours ==
=== Kolkata Mohammedan ===
- Calcutta Football League:
  - Winners (4): 1935, 1936, 1937, 1938
- IFA Shield:
  - Winners (1): 1936

=== Bengal ===
- Santosh Trophy:
  - Winners (1): 1941

=== Delhi ===
- Santosh Trophy:
  - Winners (1): 1944

=== Sindh ===
- National Football Championship:
  - Runners-up (1): 1950

== See also ==
- List of Pakistan national football team captains
