= Karachi football team =

Karachi
- Full name: Karachi football team
- Founded: 1950
- Dissolved: 1961
- Ground: Various
- Owner: Karachi Football Association
- League: National Football Championship

The Karachi football team was a Pakistani football team representing the Karachi Federal Capital Territory in the National Football Championship.

== History ==
The team competed at the National Football Championship, the premier football competition of Pakistan, from 1950 till 1960. In the beginning, the team was under the Sind-Karachi Football Association, the governing body of football in Sindh and the Karachi Federal Capital Territory. In 1950, a separate Karachi Football Association body was formed.

In April 1952, during the Iran national team visit to Pakistan, Karachi played against the visitors in Karachi, drawing 1–1.

On 21 June 1953, the team played against touring German club Kickers Offenbach in Karachi, losing 0–2.

During Iran Services team tour of Pakistan in March 1956, the Iranian team secured a 2–1 victory over Karachi at the YMCA Ground, however the Pakistan Combined Services team managed to turn the tables by defeating the visitors 2–1 in the subsequent game, avenging Karachi's earlier loss.

In the 1960 National Football Championship, the team under the name of Karachi Whites finished runner-ups after falling 0–1 against East Pakistan in the final.

In 1961, under PFF newly elected president Asghar Khan, the National Football Championship structure in Pakistan transitioned from provincial to divisional based teams for the first time, and coupled with the relocation of capital of Pakistan to Rawalpindi, the team was effectively dissolved.

== Squads ==
=== 1957 National Football Championship ===
- Ali Muhammad, Muhammad Raza, Muhammad Nisar, Aziz Baloch, Muhammad Aqil, Abid Hussain Ghazi, Muhammad Ismail, Anver Sadiq (Captain), Jehangir Khan, Ibrahim (Vice-captain), Muhammad Haroon, Muhammad Yaqub, Aurangzeb Khan, Muhammad Yousuf, Izhar Haider

=== 1958 National Football Championship ===
- Muhammad Ramzan Jr., Shamoo Abdul Ghani, Ghulam Rasool, Aziz Baloch, Muhammad Omar, Yar Muhammad (Vice-captain), Muhammad Ismail, Ghulam Muhammad, Naseeruddin, Muhammad Rashid, Ibrahim (Captain), Muhammad Yaqub, Ghulam Abbas Baloch, Abdullah Rahi, Yousuf Sr., Mahmood, Moosa Ghazi

=== 1960 National Football Championship ===
- Karachi Whites: Ghulam Hussain, Khuda Bakhsh, Turab Ali, Ismail Roshu, Ismail Sr., Ghulam Muhammad, Mirdad, Haroon (Captain), Mahmood, Ghulam Abbas Baloch (Vice-captain), Yousuf Sr., Nisar, Muhammad Yaqub, Ram Lal, Sabir, Ghulam Rasool, Abdullah, Ismail Jr.
- Karachi Greens: Shamoo Abdul Ghani (Captain), Rahman, Murad Ali, Yar Muhammad, Murad Bakhsh, Mehrab, Lal Muhammad, Yousuf Jr. (Vice-captain), Faqir Muhammad, Jamshed, Gul Muhammad, Ali Muhammad, Aziz Baloch, Muhammad Jan, Umer, Mumtaz, Abdul Razaaq, Abdul Majid, Nabi Khan

== Honours ==
- National Football Championship
  - Runners-up (1): 1960

== See also ==
- Sindh football team
- Punjab football team
- Balochistan football team
- Khyber Pakhtunkhwa football team
- East Pakistan football team
