= YMCA Ground =

Sports ground and public park in Karachi, Pakistan

- Interactive map of YMCA Ground
- Full name: Young Men's Christian Association Ground
- Location: Saddar, Karachi, Sindh, Pakistan
- Coordinates: 24.8618°N 67.0242°E
- Owner: YMCA Karachi
- Operator: YMCA Karachi with maintenance assistance by Government of Sindh
- Type: Public park and sports ground

Construction
- Opened: 1913

Website
- ymca.int/countries/pakistan

Young Men's Christian Association Ground also shortly known as the YMCA Ground, is a public park in Karachi, Pakistan. The park is best known for hosting sporting events throughout the 20th Century.

== Location and layout ==
The ground is situated in central Karachi, opposite the Governor’s House, covering an area of approximately 36,955 square yards (about 30,900 m²). It forms part of the larger YMCA Karachi property, which also includes educational and recreational facilities.

== History ==
The YMCA Karachi chapter was established in 1905–1906. It was given the rights for holding sport activities in 1913. For decades after Pakistan’s independence, the YMCA Ground functioned as a centre for youth and community sports. Historically, the YMCA Ground featured a 300-metre athletics track, Hockey fields, tennis and basketball courts, Badminton, table tennis, and martial-arts facilities, and a canteen and meeting area that served as a gathering place for Karachi’s sports community.

It produced several national-level athletes and became a regular venue for inter-school and inter-university tournaments. The facility also produced several Pakistan international hockey players, including goalkeepers Shahid Ali Khan, Mansoor Ahmed, and Ahmed Alam. The ground also held several football tournaments throughout the early 20th Century. The ground was used as the venue for the first National Football Championship which took place between 28 May and 5 June 1948, with Sindh Red beating Sindh Blue in the final. On 23 April 1952, it hosted the first ever home match of the Pakistan national football team against visiting Iran.

=== Decline and encroachment ===
During the 2000s, the YMCA Ground fell into decline and was increasingly misused for non-sporting purposes such as marriage functions and fairs.

By 2021, the site was described as “occupied” with debris, vehicles and unauthorised structures, raising safety concerns for the adjoining YMCA School. The athletics track was removed, and organised sporting activity ceased.

=== Restoration ===
After years of deterioration, restoration began under the supervision of the Commissioner of Karachi and the Supreme Court of Pakistan’s anti-encroachment directives. In January 2019, sports returned to the ground after 16 years, marked by an exhibition hockey match between President KHA XI and Commissioner Karachi XI. In November 2020, city officials announced the construction of a jogging track, underground reservoir, and green-belt restoration. By 2021, Rs 95 million renovation plan, designed by the firm Arch Vision, was launched, including new changing rooms, hockey and basketball facilities, and future swimming-pool construction. As of the 2020s, the ground also hosts occasional sports and cultural events. In December 2024, the venue was used for the 17th International Urdu Conference organised by the Arts Council of Pakistan.

== See also ==
- Sport in Karachi
- List of parks in Karachi
