= Asian Quadrangular Football Tournament =

- Organiser(s): Ceylon Football Association
- Founded: 1952; 74 years ago
- Abolished: 1955; 71 years ago
- Teams: 4
- Most championships: India (4 titles)

The Asian Quadrangular Football Tournament was an annual football tournament first held in Colombo, Ceylon. It was also alternatively known as Colombo Cup. Established in 1952 by the Ceylon Football Association as a part of the Colombo Fair, the national sides of India, Pakistan, Sri Lanka (formerly known as Ceylon) and Burma played each other in a round robin tournament. The tournament was last played in 1955. In 1953 it was hosted in Rangoon, Burma, in 1954 at Calcutta, India, and finally at Dacca, East Pakistan.

== Background ==
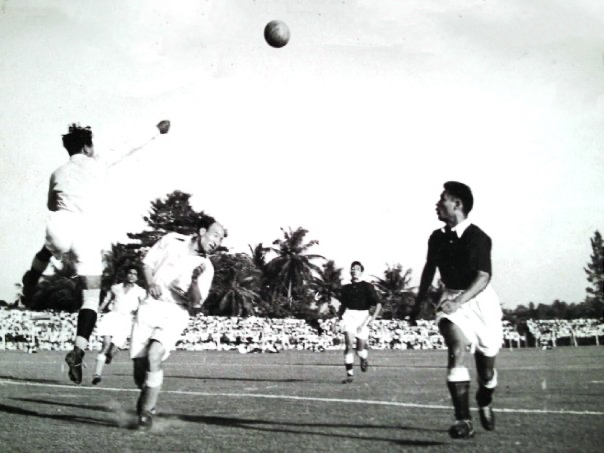
Pakistan vs Burma (in dark shirt) during the 1952 Asian Quadrangular Football Tournament

Established in 1952 by the Ceylon Football Association as a part of the Colombo Exhibition, it was Initially scheduled for March 1952 to coincide with princess Elizabeth II visit to Ceylon, the event was canceled due to the death of King George VI, which led to the cancellation of her visit.

The trophy awarded to the winner of the tournament was called the Colombo Cup. The competition featured four countries from the former British Raj: Burma, Ceylon, India and Pakistan. It was commonly referred to as the Asian Quadrangular Football Tournament or sometimes simply the Quadrangular Tournament.

The success of the 1952 event led the four countries to agree to hold annual tournaments, with each country hosting in turn and additional trophies being awarded alongside the Colombo Cup. For example, the Burma Bowl was introduced in 1953, and the Pakistan Silver Cup in 1955.

However, after the fourth tournament in 1955, plans for the next edition in March 1957 in Ceylon fell through. The Ceylon government withheld funding, and the All-India Football Federation withdrew, arguing that the Olympic Games and the Asian Games already provided enough international competition. In January 1958, there was a proposal for Ceylon and India to continue the Colombo Cup competition alone, but India rejected the idea.

== Results ==
Year	Host	Winner	Runner-up	3rd Place	4th place
1952; Details	Colombo, Ceylon	India Pakistan (Trophy shared)	None	Ceylon Burma	None
1953; Details	Rangoon, Burma	India	Pakistan	Burma	Ceylon
1954; Details	Calcutta, India	India	Ceylon	Pakistan	Burma
1955; Details	Dacca, Pakistan	India	Pakistan	Burma	Ceylon

== Stadiums ==
Year	Stadium	Location
1952	Colombo Oval	Colombo, Ceylon
1953	Aung San Stadium	Rangoon, Burma
1954	Calcutta FC Ground	Calcutta, India
1955	Dacca Stadium	Dacca, East Pakistan

== Statistics ==
=== Performance by nation ===
Team	Gold	Silver	Bronze
India	4 (1952, 1953, 1954*, 1955)		
Pakistan	1 (1952)	2 (1953, 1955)	1 (1954)
Sri Lanka		1 (1954)	1 (1952)
Burma			3 (1952, 1953, 1954)

* = host

=== Top goal scorers by edition ===
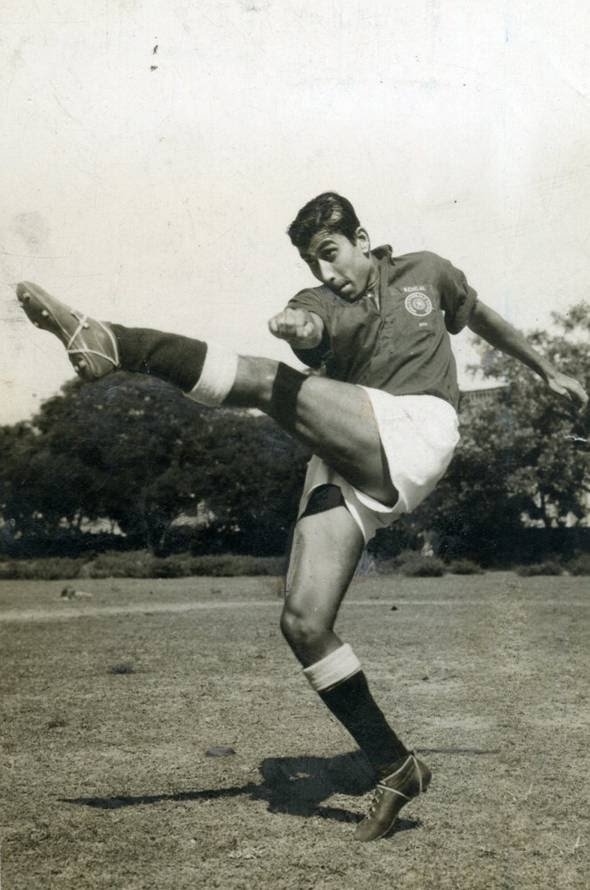
Pradip Kumar Banerjee of India scored the most number of goals in a single championship, 5 goals at the 1955 Quadrangular Tournament.

Years	Player(s)	Goals
1952	(India) Sheoo Mewalal	4
1953	(Myanmar) Gordon Samuel	4
1954	(India) Puran Bahadur Thapa	4
1955	(India) Pradip Kumar Banerjee	5

== See also ==
- Football in Asia
- Merdeka Tournament
