= Ghulam Muhammad (footballer) =

Pakistani footballer

Personal information
- Full name: Ghulam Muhammad Sr.
- Date of birth: Unknown
- Place of birth: Peshawar, British India
- Date of death: Unknown
- Position: Midfielder

Senior career*
Years	Team	Apps	(Gls)
1940s	Young Men Peshawar		
1940s	Bata Sports		
1948–1950s	Kolkata Mohammedan		
1950s	Raiders		
1950s	Pakistan Mint		

International career
1952	Pakistan	1	(0)
- * Club domestic league appearances and goals

Ghulam Muhammad (Urdu: غلام محمد), also known by his nickname Gama, was a Pakistani footballer who played as a midfielder. He played for the Pakistan national team at the 1952 Asian Quadrangular Football Tournament. He also played for Kolkata Mohammedan.

== Early life ==
Ghulam hailed Peshawar.

== Club career ==
Ghulam started his career with Young Men Peshawar football club, and later joined Lahore based Bata Sports Club. He also represented North-West India Football Association team at the Santosh Trophy.

After the independence of Pakistan, he represented Punjab in the National Football Championship. He participated in the Rovers Cup with Raiders. He also played for Kolkata Mohammedan. At the Lahore District Football League, Ghulam played for Pakistan Mint.

== International career ==
In 1952, Ghulam was selected to represent the Pakistan national football team for their participation in the 1952 Asian Quadrangular Football Tournament. He played as starter against Ceylon in a 2–0 victory.
