= 1946–47 Santosh Trophy =

National Football Championship

Tournament details
- Country: India
- Dates: 25 December 1946 – 03 October 1947

Final positions
- Champions: Mysore (1st title)
- Runners-up: Bengal
- 60 minute matches

The 1946–47 Santosh Trophy was the fourth edition of the Santosh Trophy, the main State competition for football in India. It was held in Bangalore. Hosts Mysore defeated Bengal 2–1 in the replayed final.

== Preliminary matches ==
25 December 1946

Mysore	6–1	NWIFA
Raman 10', 24'; Graham 18', 50'; Vajravelu 27'; Sampangi 55'	Report	Niaz 29'

Olympic Stadium, Bangalore
Referee: Smolley

27 December 1946

Delhi	3–1	Travancore
Mohinderpal 32'; Rubbani 35'; Kunwar Munir 60'		Govindan 22'

Olympic Stadium, Bangalore
Referee: Smolley

== Semi-final ==
31 December 1946

Bengal	1–0	Hyderabad
Mewalal 41'

== Final ==
Mysore	0–0	Bengal

3 January 1947

Mysore	2–1 replay	Bengal
Sattar 31'; Dhanraj 60'		Sabu 57'

Referee: Smolley

Dewan of Mysore Sir Ramasamy Mudaliar awarded the prizes.

== Squads ==
- Mysore : Straffin; Syed Mohiuddin and Samad; Basheer, Shanmugham and Khader; Raman, Sattar, Dhanraj, Venkatesh and Vajravelu
- Bengal : Ismail; Manna and Taj Mohammad; Mahabir Prasad, T. Ao and A. Dey; S. Nandy, Sabu, Mewalal, Appa Rao and R. Das
- Attah Ullah, Saeed Mirza, Abdul Rahman, Badri Narain, Akmal Leghari, Hamid-ul-Haq, Hussain Ali, Niaz Ali, Haroon, Karim Bakhsh, Mohammad Amin, S. N. Dutta, Abdul Rahim, A. W. Qazi, Mohammad Aslam.
