= Niaz Ali =

Pakistani footballer (1924 – 2003)

Niaz Ali Khan
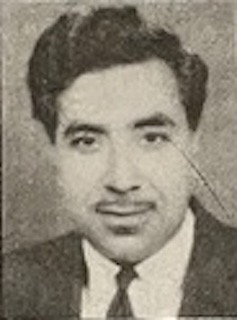

Personal information
- Full name: Niaz Ali Khan
- Date of birth: 1924
- Place of birth: Peshawar, British India
- Date of death: 4 January 2003 (aged 78–79)
- Place of death: Lahore, Pakistan
- Height: 5 ft 8 in (1.73 m)
- Position: Midfielder

Senior career*
Years	Team	Apps	(Gls)
1944–??	Bata Sports		
1953	East Bengal		

International career
1952–1954	Pakistan	10	(0)
- * Club domestic league appearances and goals

Niaz Ali Khan (Urdu: نیاز علی خان; 1924 – 4 January 2003) was a Pakistani footballer who played as a midfielder for the Pakistan football team during the 1950s. Niaz was also one of the few Pakistani footballers to play in India, for East Bengal, in the Calcutta Football League.

== Early and personal life ==
Niaz was born in 1924 in Peshawar, North-West Frontier Province, British India. Khan later moved to Bata Pur, Lahore where he worked for Bata Shoe Company for 50 years.

Niaz married in 1959.

== Club career ==
Niaz started playing football for Bata Sports in 1944, and represented them till the 1950s. Helping them win the Lahore District Football League several times. Aside from Bata, he also played for Peshawar Muhammadan.

In 1946, Niaz was selected to represent the North-West India Football Association football team for the 1946–47 Santosh Trophy. In which he score a consolation goal in a 1–6 defeat against eventual champions, Mysore State.

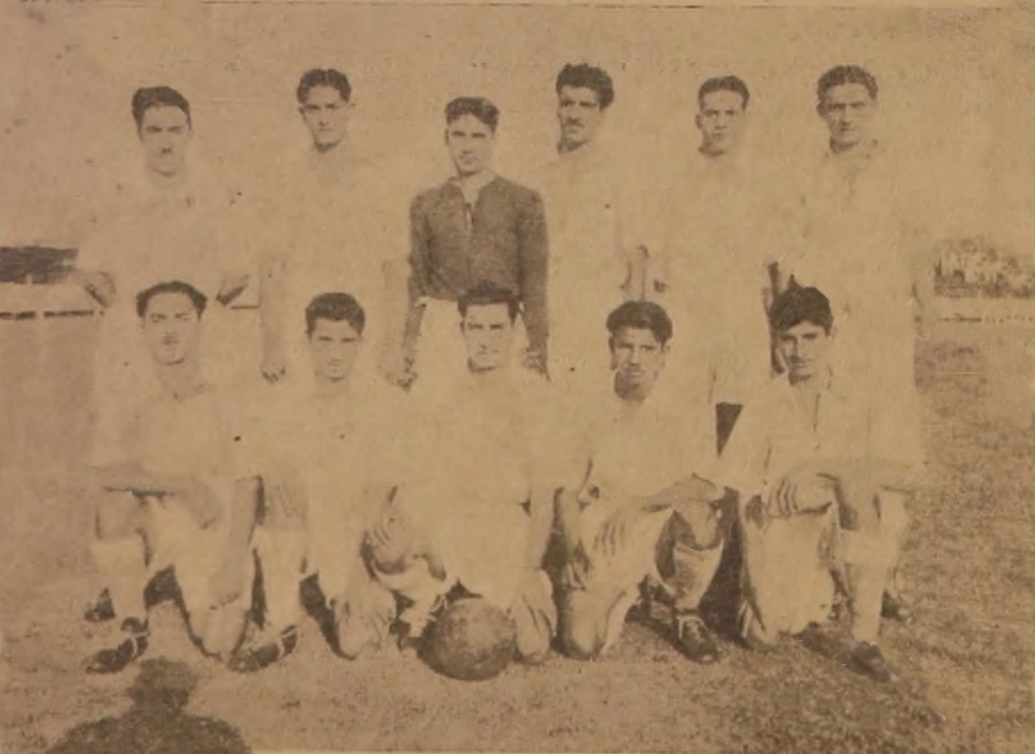
Niaz (extreme left), with the Punjab football team in 1952.

At the National Football Championship, Niaz represented the Punjab football team in the National Football Championship, captaining the team in 1952.

=== East Bengal ===
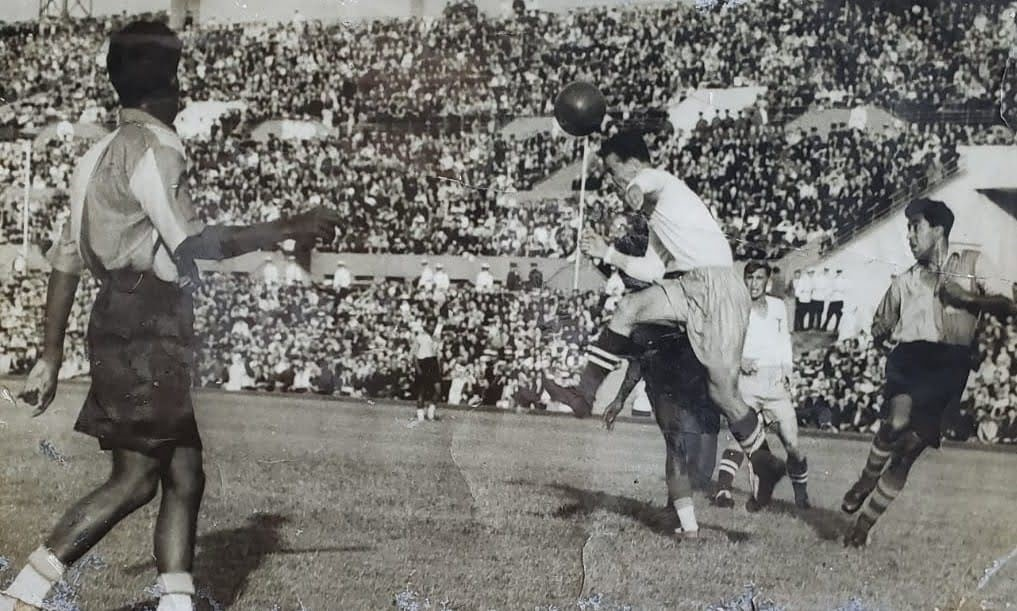
Niaz (far right) with East Bengal during the tour to USSR in 1953

In 1953, Niaz Ali joined East Bengal for a lone season. He played at the 4th World Festival of Youth and Students in Bucharest, and later toured USSR with East Bengal. During his stay, Niaz alongside fellow national teammate, Masood Fakhri, were both suspended. As the Indian Cultural League filed a report stating that the Pakistan Football Federation prohibited the fielding of Pakistani players in India without a permit. East Bengal put out a statement, which was that they had received permission from the organization. After both players were included in the line-up for the third replay in the IFA Shield. The matter was resolved on 11 October 1953, with the IFA siding with the ICL, which resulted in a suspension for East Bengal from all football activities until 31 December 1954. The club fought back in court, and managed to eventually get their suspension revoked.

== International career ==
Niaz represented the Pakistan football team between 1952 and 1954, making 10 appearances.

In 1952, Niaz Ali Khan was called up to the Pakistan football team for the 1952 Asian Quadrangular Football Tournament, where he featured in all three games as starter, winning the title along with India. The same year, he played in a friendly match against Iran at Karachi.

On 25 April 1954, he played in a friendly against Singapore at the Jalan Besar Stadium. During the 1954 Asian Games, Niaz played against Singapore and Burma. Niaz also played at the 1954 Asian Quadrangular Football Tournament, featuring in all three games.

== Death ==
Niaz died on 4 January 2003 from prostate cancer in Lahore, Pakistan.

== Honours ==
Pakistan

- Asian Quadrangular Football Tournament:
  - Winners: 1952
  - Third place: 1954
