= 1954 Asian Quadrangular Football Tournament =

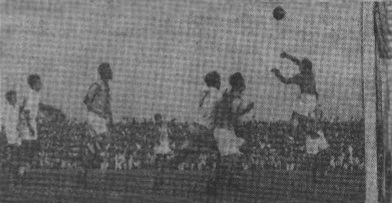
- India versus Pakistan on 26 December

Tournament details
- Host country: India
- Dates: 18–26 December 1954
- Teams: 4 (from 1 confederation)
- Venue: 1 (in 1 host city)

Final positions
- Champions: India (3rd title)
- Runners-up: Ceylon
- Third place: Pakistan

Tournament statistics
- Matches played: 6
- Goals scored: 17 (2.83 per match)
- Top scorer: (India) Puran Bahadur Thapa (4 goals)

1954 Asian Quadrangular Football Tournament was the third edition of the Asian Quadrangular Football Tournament held in Calcutta, India. India won the tournament for a third time.

== Squads ==
Ceylon	India	Pakistan
Peter Ranasinghe (captain); M. Sheriff; J. A. G. Wilson; O. K. Khan; A. C. M. Junaid; M. B. Saldin; T. Meedin; K. A. Premadasa; M. I. M. Laheer; T. S. Jayman; M. Sainoon; Tom Marikar Deen; Andrew Fernando; N. B. Hemachandra; Tom Ossen; A. R. Jailabdeen; Karunapala Fernando	Sailen Manna (captain); Sanat Sett; Sanjeeva Uchil; Sayed Khwaja Aziz-ud-Din; Sheikh Abdul Latif; Pearl; G. R. Gokul; Chandan Singh Rawat; Prakash Singh; Muhammad Noor; Pansanttom Venkatesh; Syed Moinuddin; G. Y. S. Laiq; Samar Banerjee; Mohammad Abdus Sattar; Ahmed Khan; Puran Bahadur Thapa; Jaganathan; Anthony Patrick; Neville D'Souza	Jamil Akhtar (captain); Fazalur Rehman; Lt. Mazhar Siddique; Riasat Ali; Muhammad Abdul Malik; Nazir Hussain; Niaz Ali; Nabi Chowdhury; Dad Muhammad; Ghulam Mohyuddin; Akbar Jan; Moideen Kutty; Muhammad Amin; Masood Fakhri; Ghulam Rabbani; Ata

== Points Tables ==
Pos	Team	Pld	W	D	L	GF	GA	GD	Pts	Final result
1	India	3	2	1	0	6	3	+3	5	Champions
2	Ceylon	3	1	1	1	4	4	0	3	
3	Pakistan	3	1	1	1	4	5	−1	3	
4	Burma	3	0	1	2	3	5	−2	1	

Source: RSSSF

== Matches ==
18 December 1954

India	1–1	Ceylon
Moin 71'	Report	Fernando 90'

Calcutta FC Ground, Calcutta

19 December 1954

Pakistan	1–1	Burma
Fakhri 44'	Report	Sein Pe 50'

Calcutta FC Ground, Calcutta

21 December 1954

Pakistan	2–1	Ceylon
Jamil 46'; Amin 63'	Report	M. Sainoon 1'

Calcutta FC Ground, Calcutta

23 December 1954

India	2–1	Burma
Thapa 16'; Patrick 44'	Report	Samuel 46'

Calcutta FC Ground, Calcutta

25 December 1954

Ceylon	2–1	Burma
Deen 8'; Fernando 13'	Report	Htoo Wa 34'

Calcutta FC Ground, Calcutta

26 December 1954

India	3–1	Pakistan
Thapa 48', 70', 71'	Report	Fakhri 57'

Calcutta FC Ground, Calcutta
Attendance: 1,00,000
Referee: Mac Hedger (Singapore)

== Statistics ==
=== Goalscorers ===
There were 17 goals scored in 6 matches, for an average of 2.83 goals per match.

4 goals

- (India) Puran Bahadur Thapa

2 goals

- (Dominion of Ceylon) Andrew Fernando
- (Pakistan) Masood Fakhri

1 goal

- (India) Syed Moinuddin
- (Myanmar) Sein Pe
- (Pakistan) Jamil Akhtar
- (Pakistan) Muhammad Amin
- (Dominion of Ceylon) M. Sainoon
- (India) Anthony Patrick
- (Myanmar) Gordon Samuel
- (Dominion of Ceylon) Tom Marikar Deen
- (Dominion of Ceylon) M. Sainoon
