= Abdus Sattar (footballer) =

British Indian footballer

Personal information
- Date of birth: 1920
- Place of birth: Bangalore, Mysore, British India
- Date of death: Unknown
- Position: Right-back

Senior career*
| Years | Team | Apps | (Gls) |
- Bangalore Crescent Club
- Bangalore Muslims
| 1932–1941 | Mohammedan Sporting | | |
- * Club domestic league appearances and goals

Abdus Sattar, was a former footballer, who played for Mohammedan Sporting from 1932 to 1941, Sattar was among the players of the Golden Era of the 1930s, being influential in the team's defensive structure.

== Early life ==
Sattar was born in Bangalore, Mysore, of then British India.

== Playing career ==
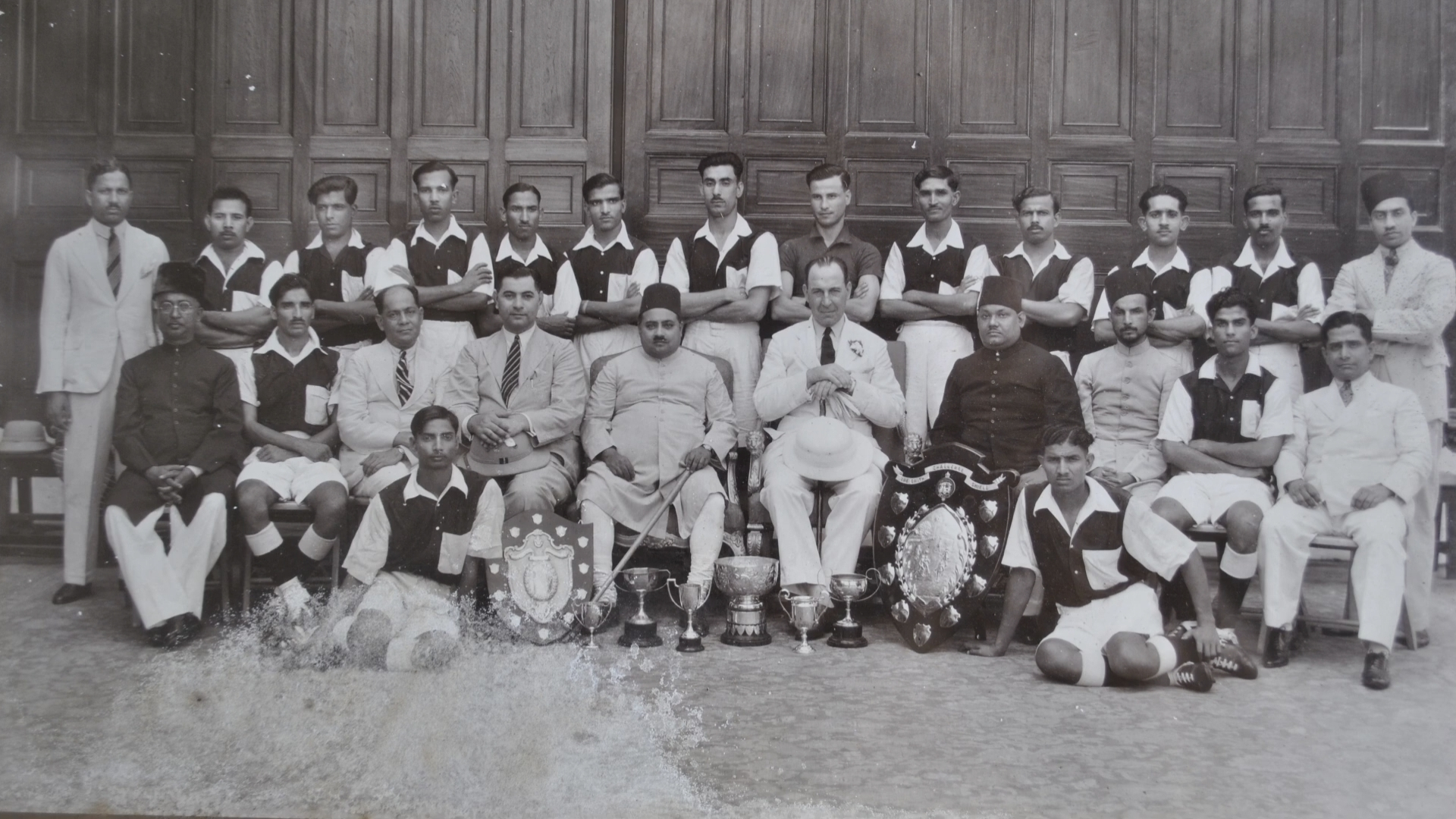
Sattar (third from left, standing row), with Mohammedan Sporting in 1935.

Sattar started off his career with Bangalore Crescent Club, before then joining the Bangalore Muslims. He was recruited to Mohammedan Sporting in 1932 by one of their star players, Mustafa.

Sattar would make his debut for the club at the 1932 Rovers Cup. Two years later, he helped the team gain promotion to the first division of the Calcutta Football League, playing an integral role in the team's defence. Sattar would also feature as a regular starter for the team over the years, before retiring in 1941.

On 11 June 1937, during a match between Mohammedan Sporting and East Bengal, an incident occurred where East Bengal player, Padma Bannerjee, collided with Mohammedan player, Rahmat, due to this, a sudden clash between the two teams had been initiated. Sattar, who was on the bench, had reportedly hit East Bengal official, Girin Ghose. After this incident, several violent incidents broke out, the IFA would carry out a three-year suspension, instead of suspending Sattar, the suspension would be handed to another Mohammedan player, Habib.

== Post-retirement ==
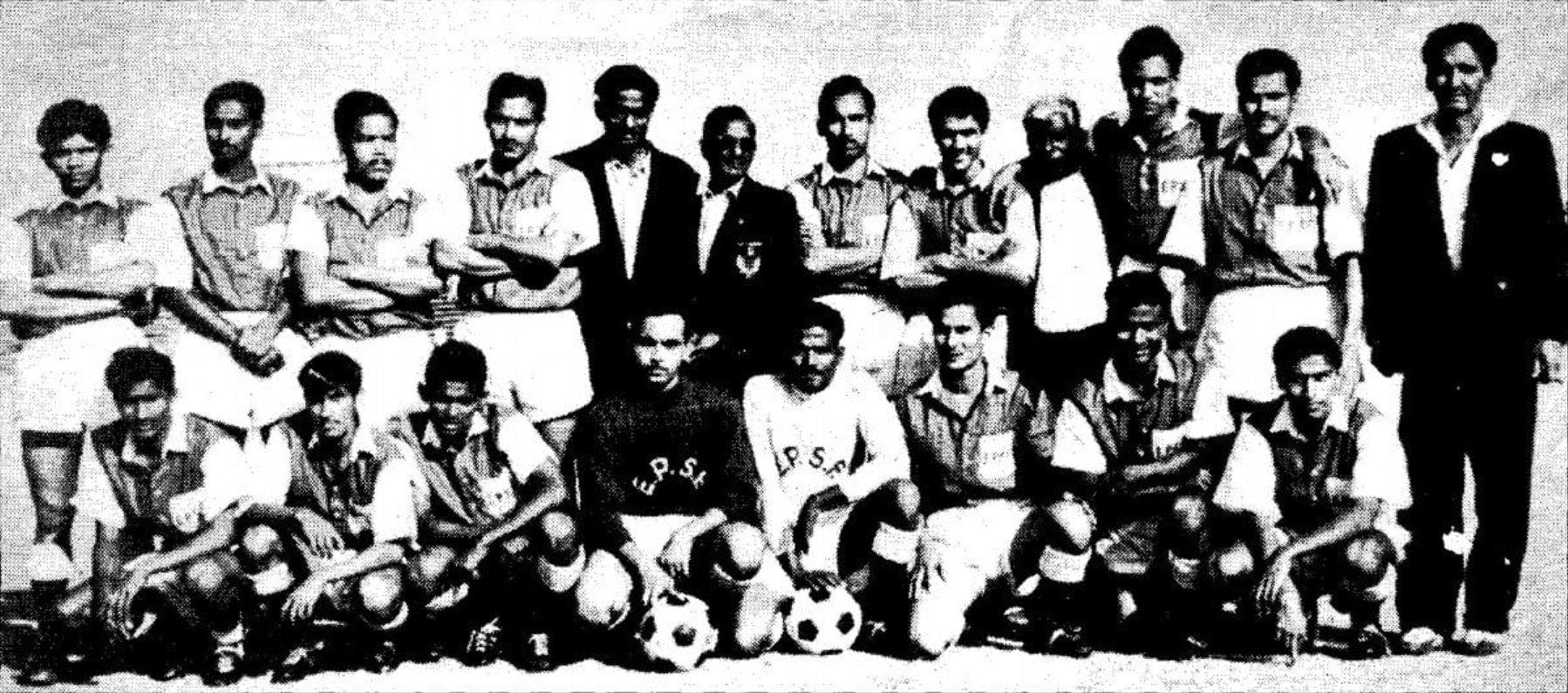
Sattar (fourth from right, standing row) with the East Pakistan football team before an exhibition match against the China national team.

After the Partition of India, Sattar opted to move to Pakistan. He would then transition into the field of coaching, where he would develop several football players.
