= Anthony Patrick =

Indian footballer

Personal information
- Date of birth: 1927
- Place of birth: Hyderabad, British India
- Date of death: 22 April 2010 (aged 83)
- Place of death: Hyderabad, Telangana, India
- Position: Forward

Senior career*
| Years | Team | Apps | (Gls) |
| 1949–1959 | Hyderabad City Police | | |

International career
- India
- * Club domestic league appearances and goals

Anthony Patrick (1927 – 22 April 2010) was an Indian footballer who played for the India national team and represented Hyderabad City Police FC in domestic tournaments.

== Playing career ==
He was selected to play for the national team at the 1954 Asian Games at Manila and also at the 1953 and 1954 editions of the Asian Quadrangular Football Tournament. In 1954 Asian Quadrangular Football Tournament, he scored a goal against Burma national football team at Eden Gardens. He also won five Rovers Cup titles while playing for the Rahim managed Hyderabad City Police consecutively from 1950 to 1954. He also represented Hyderabad in Santosh Trophy.

== Honours ==
Hyderabad City Police

- Durand Cup: 1950–51, 1954, 1957–58, 1961; runner-up: 1952, 1956–57
- Rovers Cup: 1950, 1951, 1952, 1953, 1954, 1957
- DCM Trophy: 1959
- Sait Nagjee Trophy: 1958

India

- Asian Quadrangular Football Tournament: 1953, 1954

Hyderabad

- Santosh Trophy: 1956–57, 1957–58
