= Jamil Akhtar =

Pakistani footballer

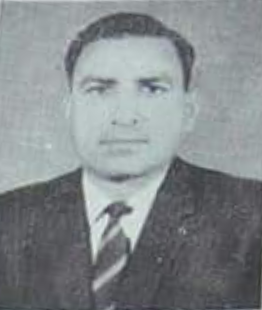
- Akhtar in 1974

Personal information
- Date of birth: 1930 (age 95–96)
- Place of birth: British India
- Place of death: Pakistan
- Position: Striker

Youth career
- 1948–1951: Punjab University

Senior career*
Years	Team	Apps	(Gls)
1948–1954	Rangers		
1954	East Bengal		
1954–??	North-Western Railway		
1958	Zamindar Club		

International career
1952–1955	Pakistan	14	(8)

Managerial career
- Pakistan Western Railway
- * Club domestic league appearances and goals

Jamil Akhtar (Urdu: جمیل اختر; born 1930) was a Pakistani footballer who played as an inside left forward. Considered as one of the earliest pioneering footballers in Pakistan history, he was the fifth captain in the history of the Pakistan national football team after Osman Jan, Abdul Wahid Durrani, Muhammad Sharif and Moideen Kutty. Jamil also played for East Bengal in India.

== Club career ==
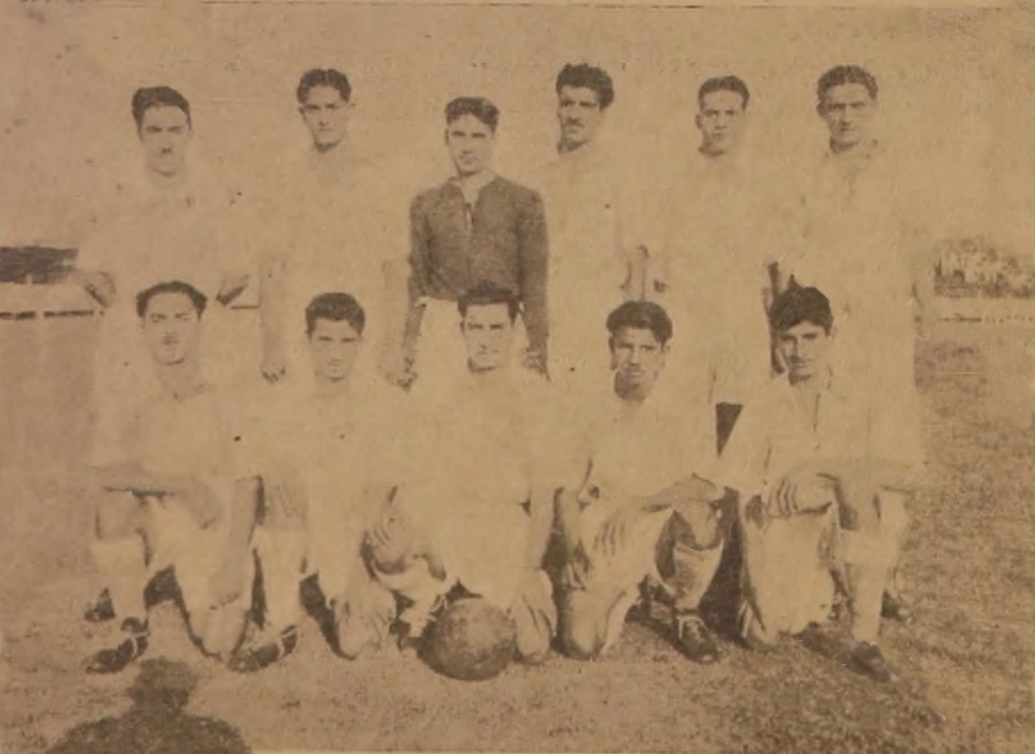
Jamil (middle, sitting row), with the Punjab football team in 1952.

Jamil was member of Lahore club Rangers throughout his career. He represented Punjab University football team from 1948 to 1951. In 1950, he played for Rangers FC at the Rovers Cup in 1951 in Bombay. He won the Lahore District Soccer Championship with the club in June 1951.

He also represented Punjab in the National Football Championship from 1950 to 1953, captaining the team in the last year. He later played for Pakistan Railways at the National Football Championship.

In 1954, Jamil appearead for the Calcutta Football League side, East Bengal, scoring on his debut for the club. Later on, Jamil played for Lahore club Zamindars FC.

Jamil also represented the Lahore Division at the "North-West Railway Inter-Divisional Football Tournament".

== International career ==
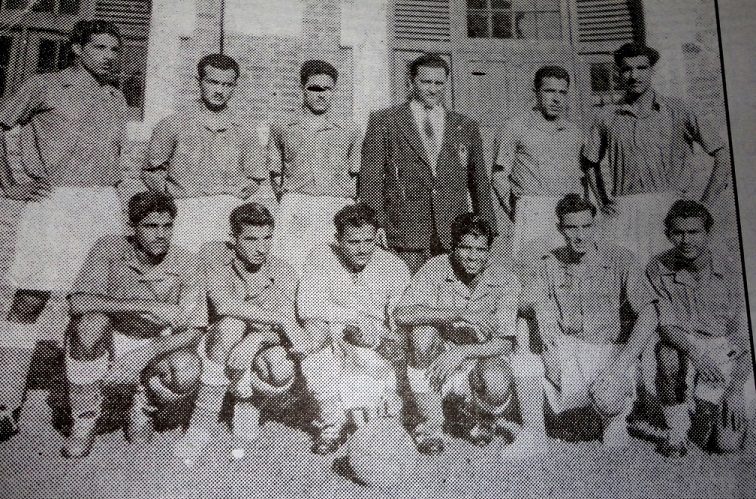
Jamil with the Pakistan national team in 1953 (second sitting from right)

In 1952, Jamil represented Pakistan in the 1952 Asian Quadrangular Football Tournament in Ceylon, making his debut in the last match of the tournament against India. The following year, he was a part of the team for the 1953 Asian Quadrangular Football Tournament, appearing in all three matches, where he scored once against Burma and twice against Ceylon. He also appeared in a 1–0 win against India, after the conclusion of the tournament.

In a preparation match, he scored against a Singapore combined Colony XI in a 4–1 victory on 24 April 1954. In the next match against the Singapore national team, held the following day, Jamil found the net once again, the match would end in a 2–2 draw. At the 1954 Asian Games, he scored a brace in a 6–2 win against Singapore in a group match, where Masood Fakhri had notably scored a hat-trick, and Moideen Kutty also scored a goal, and also appeared in the 1–2 loss against Burma.

Jamil subsequently became the fifth captain in the history of the Pakistan national football team at the 1954 Asian Quadrangular Football Tournament, being a starter in all three matches played, scoring a goal against Ceylon in a 2–1 victory.

At the next 1955 Asian Quadrangular Football Tournament, he featured in all three matches, and scored in a 4–2 victory against Burma. At the exhibition matches at the beginning of the tournament, he scored a hat trick against an East Pakistan XI on 14 December in a 3–1 victory.

== Coaching career ==
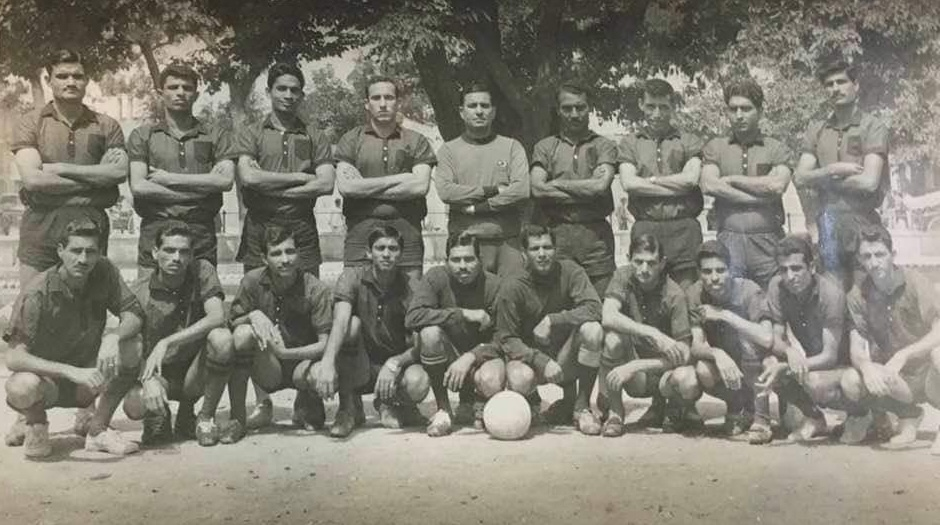
Akhtar standing fifth from left as coach of Pakistan Railways

After retirement as player, Jamil served as coach of the Pakistan Western Railway football team.

== Career statistics ==
=== International goals ===
Scores and results list Pakistan's goal tally first, score column indicates score after each Jamil goal.

List of international goals scored by Jamil Akhtar
No.	Date	Venue	Opponent	Score	Result	Competition	Ref.
1	28 October 1953	Aung San Stadium, Rangoon, Burma	Burma	1–0	1–1	1953 Asian Quadrangular Football Tournament	
2	2 November 1953	Aung San Stadium, Rangoon, Burma	Ceylon	2–0	6–0	1953 Asian Quadrangular Football Tournament	
3	2 November 1953	Aung San Stadium, Rangoon, Burma	Ceylon	3–0	6–0	1953 Asian Quadrangular Football Tournament	
4	25 April 1954	Jalan Besar Stadium, Kallang, Singapore	Singapore		2–2	Friendly	
5	2 May 1954	Rizal Memorial Stadium, Manila, Philippines	Singapore	1–1	6–2	1954 Asian Games	
6	2 May 1954	Rizal Memorial Stadium, Manila, Philippines	Singapore	2–1	6–2	1954 Asian Games	
7	21 December 1954	Calcutta FC Ground, Kolkata, India	Ceylon		2–1	1954 Asian Quadrangular Football Tournament	
8	17 December 1955	Dacca Stadium, Dhaka, East Pakistan	Burma		4–2	1955 Asian Quadrangular Football Tournament	

== Honours ==
Pakistan

- Asian Quadrangular Football Tournament:
  - Winners (1): 1952

=== Punjab ===
- National Football Championship:
  - Winners (2): 1952, 1953

== See also ==
- List of Pakistan national football team captains
- List of foreign players for SC East Bengal
