= Raiders FC =

Pakistani football club

- Full name: Raiders Football Club
- Short name: Raiders FC
- Founded: 1938; 88 years ago
- Ground: Raiders FC Ground
- League: Lahore District Football League

Raiders Football Club, is a Pakistani association football club based in Lahore. Established during the British India era, it is considered one of the oldest football clubs in Pakistan. The club emerged as a prominent side in the late 1940s and 1950s, with several notable footballers representing it, including Taj Mohammad Sr., Fazalur Rehman, Ghulam Muhammad, Motahar Ali Khan, and Masood Fakhri.

== History ==
=== Early years (1940s) ===
The team was formed in 1938 before the World War II. The club emerged in the late 1940s, participating in several local and regional tournaments. With several of the clubs players also taking part in trials for the then upcoming 1948 Inter-Provincial Football Tournament.

=== Rise to prominence (1950s) ===
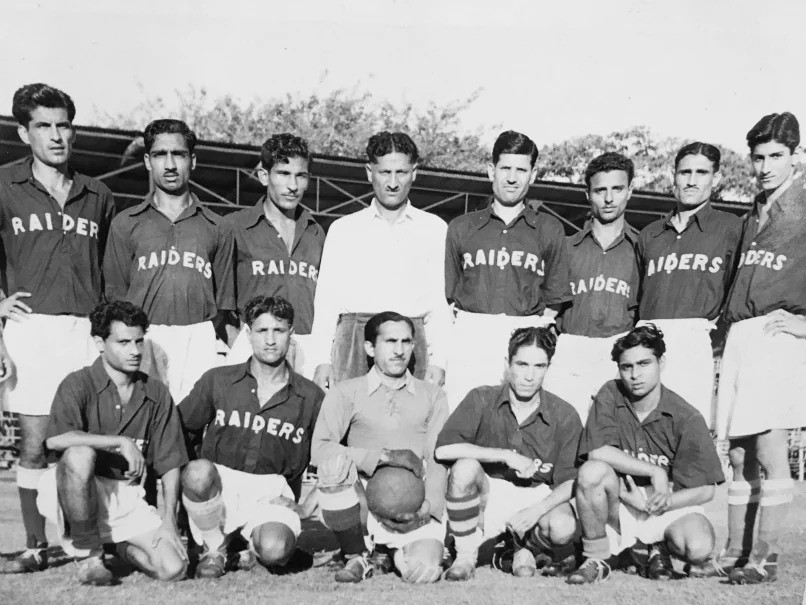
Raiders FC photographed in the 1950s.

In 1950, the team managed to reach the final of the Iqbal Football Tournament. Meeting rivals Rangers in the final. After an embarrassing defeat to the rivals earlier the same year in May. A match which ended in 1–5 for the team. Expectations for the Raiders were low, the final, held on 4 December 1950, would prove that the team would solidifiy themselves as a dominant force, both teams faced off each other, with the Raiders taking the edge and defeating their opponents 1–0 through a free kick.

The following year, the club opened a "Health and Football Coaching Institute" in Lahore.

During this formative period, the team also participated in the Lahore District Football League. Where they reached the league final the same year, against strong opposition Bata Sports Club, the team failed to secure the championship, being defeated 2–0. The following year, the club enrolled in the 1951 Rovers Cup, being beaten by Aryan FC in the quarter-finals of the tournament. The next year, the club was again invited to the tournament, with star player Masood Fakhri returning to the team for the tournament, making it all the way to the semi-finals, eventually losing to Bombay Amateurs, after this loss, the team beat the Central Railways in the third place match. Due to these impressive performances by the club, the Raiders once again participated in the tournament for the third consecutive time, this time, they secured an impressive 3–0 victory over heavy favorites Mohun Bagan, with goals from Akbar Jan, Abdul Aziz, and Masood Fakhri. And avenged their previous years loss against Bombay Amateurs, by defeating them in the second round of the tournament, with goals from Iqbal and Wali. However, the team was then defeated by Burmah-Shell Sports Club 2–0.

In 1954, the team participated in the Olympians Hot Weather Football Tournament, beating strong teams such as Terrors Club, Rangers, Olympians B, alongside more. However, it remains unclear whether the team won the tournament or not. The subsequent year, the team competed in the Quaid-e-Azam Football Tournament, reaching the quarter-finals of the tournament, before being knocked out by the Pakistan Moghuls of Karachi.

For the remainder of the decade, the club participated in several local and regional tournaments.

=== Dry Spell (1960s) ===
From the start of the new decade, the club continued to participate in the Lahore District Football League.

In 1961, a new set of office-bearers were elected at the annual general meet of the club, held on March 23 in Lahore. Where, Mr. Wali Muhammad was announced as general secretary alongside Mr. Abdul Hamid, and assistant secretaries as Mr. Bashir Ahmed and Mr. Khawaja Riaz Ahmed.

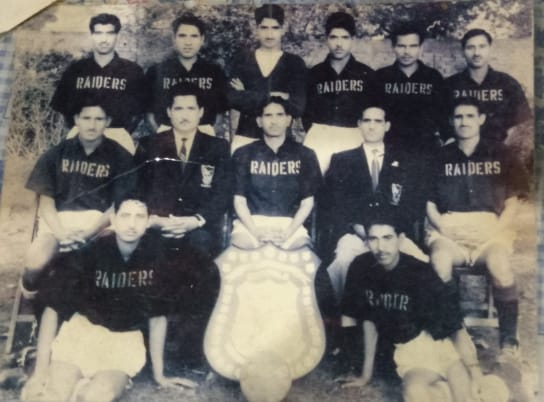
Raiders FC with the 1962 Lahore District Football League trophy

At the 1962 Lahore District Football League, the team shared the title with Rovers Club, after both teams ended with even points. Raiders Club won the coin toss to keep the trophy for the first six months. One year on, the team played a friendly against a Burma Army XI, losing 0–4. The team also participated in the "Gen Musa Football Tournament" held at Quetta. As well as taking part in the "All-Pakistan Lahore Silver Shield Football Tournament" the next year.

In 1965, the team enrolled in the "All-Pakistan Football Tournament". Two years later, the team again participated in the "Gen Musa Football Tournament", however, they were beaten by the eventual finalists West Pakistan Government Press.

=== Later years (2000s) ===
the club would then go on to take part in several local tournaments in the 2000s.

== Honours ==
=== Domestic ===
- Lahore District Football League:
  - Winners (1): 1962
  - Runners-up (1): 1950
- Iqbal Football Tournament:
  - Winners (1): 1950
- All-Pakistan Major-General Iftikhar Khan Tournament:
  - Runners-up (1): 1952

=== Invitational ===
- Rovers Cup:
  - Third-place: 1952
