= 1953 Asian Quadrangular Football Tournament =

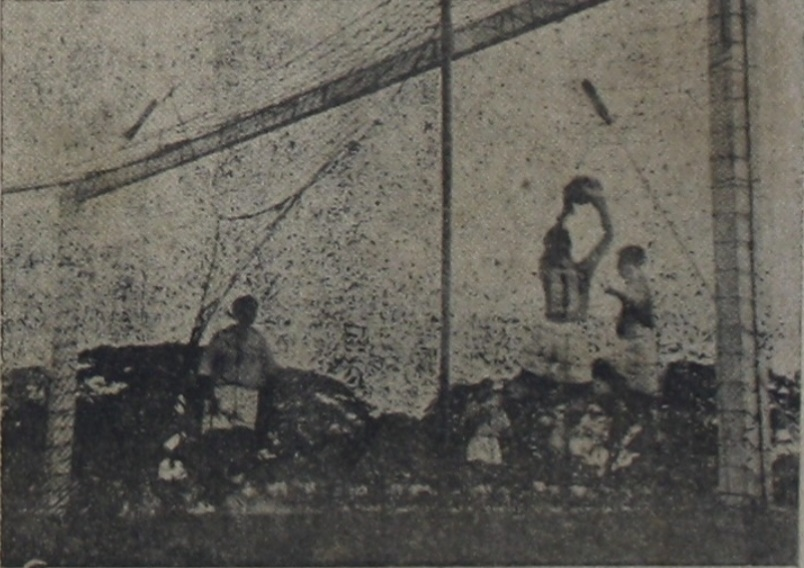
- India versus Burma on 31 October

Tournament details
- Host country: Burma
- Dates: 23 October – 2 November 1953
- Teams: 4 (from 1 confederation)
- Venue: 1 (in 1 host city)

Final positions
- Champions: India (2nd title)
- Runners-up: Pakistan
- Third place: Burma

Tournament statistics
- Matches played: 6
- Goals scored: 22 (3.67 per match)
- Top scorer: (Myanmar) Gordon Samuel (4 goals)

The 1953 Asian Quadrangular Football Tournament was the second edition of the Asian Quadrangular Football Tournament held in Rangoon, Burma. India won the cup for a second time by winning all thee matches. It was India's first outright win in an international football tournament played abroad. The team received the Colombo Cup and a Special Burma Cup for permanent retention.

== Overview ==
The India team arrived in Rangoon on 22 October 1953 and the Pakistan side, a week before. The Indian Express described the Aung San Stadium, where all matches were to be played, as having "concrete and semi permanent stands all around the ground" with a capacity of 30,000. The rules of the tournament had not made wearing boots mandatory. Four of India's players — Sailen Manna, Ahmed Khan, Pansanttom Venkatesh and M. Thangaraj (in the second half) — played bare-footed against Pakistan in the tournament's first game, on 23 October. Matches lasted 70 minutes, with 5 minutes recess.

== Squads ==
Ceylon	India	Pakistan
T. H. Soono (captain); M. Sheriff; O. L. M. H. Deen; A. C. M. Junaid; A. C. M. Khan; Karunapala Fernando; T. Bongso; L. Cornelies; Andrew Fernando; T. J. Azeez; Tom Ossen; Peter Ranasinghe; Basheer Ahmed; K. A. Premadasa; A. R. Jailabdeen; M. I. M. Laheer; K. S. Richard; K. Poddiappuhamy	Sailen Manna (captain); Sanjeeva Uchil; Kenchappa Varadaraj; K. S. Mani; Sayed Khwaja Aziz-ud-Din; G. Muthuraj; Shankar; Anthony Patrick; Chandan Singh Rawat; A. R. Gokul Kumar; Amal Dutta; Pansanttom Venkatesh; Neville D'Souza; M. Thangaraj; Ahmed Khan; Mohammad Abdus Sattar; M. Jayaram; V. J. Pereira	Muhammad Sharif (captain); Moideen Kutty; Jamil Akhtar; Sumbal Khan; Abdul Majid; Ahmed Ali Phullo; Taj Mohammad Jr.; Shamoo Abdul Ghani; Akbar Jan; Rashidullah Khan; Fazal Rehman; Talib Ali; Riasat Ali; Abdul Haq; Muhammad Amin; Lt. Mazhar Siddique; Muhammad Abdul Malik; Tarapada Roy

== Results ==
Pos	Team	Pld	W	D	L	GF	GA	GD	Pts	Final result
1	India	3	3	0	0	7	2	+5	6	Champions
2	Pakistan	3	1	1	1	7	2	+5	3	
3	Burma	3	1	1	1	6	7	−1	3	
4	Ceylon	3	0	0	3	2	11	−9	0	

Source: RSSSF

== Matches ==
23 October 1953

India	1–0	Pakistan
D'Souza 59'	Report

Aung San Stadium, Rangoon
Referee: U. Kim Teikh (Burma)

24 October 1953

Burma	3–2	Ceylon
Samuel 22', 60', 64'	Report	Ossen 21'; Azeez 47'

Aung San Stadium, Rangoon

27 October 1953

India	2–0	Ceylon
Venkatesh; Khan 35'	Report

Aung San Stadium, Rangoon
Attendance: 25,000
Referee: Maung May Lay (Burma)

28 October 1953

Burma	1–1	Pakistan
Ba Kyu 60' (pen.)	Report	Jamil 49'

Aung San Stadium, Rangoon

31 October 1953

Burma	2–4	India
Samuel (?); Ba Kyu 60'	Report	M. Thangaraj 4' (?); Venkatesh (?); Khan (?)

Aung San Stadium, Rangoon
Referee: Mahmood Shah (Pakistan)

2 November 1953

Pakistan	6–0	Ceylon
Akbar 7'; Jamil 10', 13'; Junaid 11' (o.g.); Kutty 37', 42'	Report

Aung San Stadium, Rangoon

== Statistics ==
=== Goalscorers ===
There were 22 goals scored in 6 matches, for an average of 3.67 goals per match.

4 goals

- (Myanmar) Gordon Samuel

3 goals

- (Pakistan) Jamil Akhtar

2 goals

- (India) Ahmed Khan
- (India) Peter Thangaraj
- (India) Pansanttom Venkatesh
- (Myanmar) Ba Kyu
- (Pakistan) Moideen Kutty

1 goal

- (India) Neville D'Souza
- (Dominion of Ceylon) Tom Ossen
- (Dominion of Ceylon) Azeez
- (Pakistan) Akbar Jan

1 own goal

- (Dominion of Ceylon) Junaid (against Pakistan)
