= Lahore District Football League =

Football league of Lahore

- Organising bodies: NWIFA (1936–1947); LDFA (c. 1947–??)
- Founded: August 1936
- First season: 1936–37
- Folded: Unknown
- Country: British India, Pakistan
- Confederation: AFC
- Number of clubs: 16–20
- Domestic cups: North-West India Football Championship; Lahore District Inter-Unit football tournament; Lahore District Football Championship; National Football Championship

The Lahore District Football League, commonly known as the Lahore Football League, was formed by the North-West India Football Association in 1936. The league consisted of several teams from the region such as Raiders, Rangers, Olympians, Zamindars, among many more, and was the one of the country's earliest professional football leagues at the time.

== History ==
=== Pre-Partition (1936–1947) ===
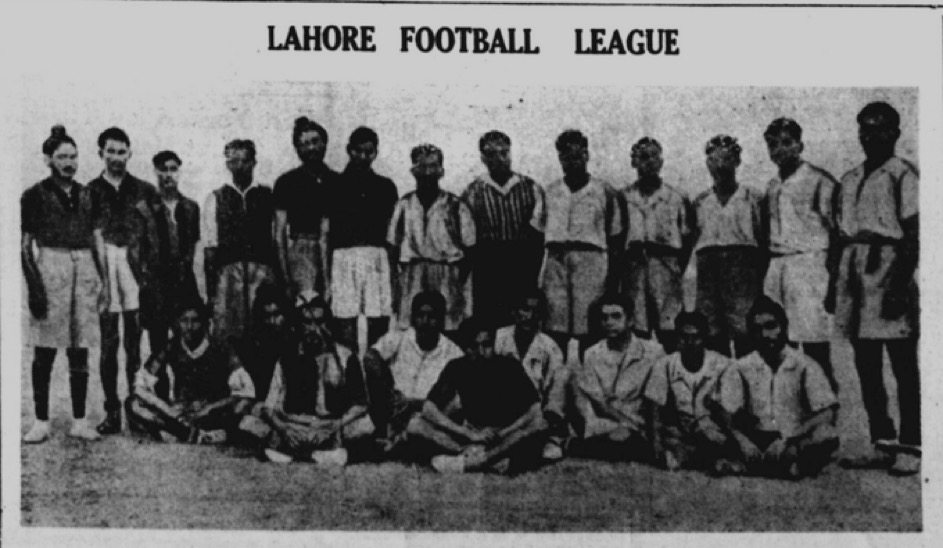
The Old Boys and the Dyal Singh College football teams photographed after a match.

In August 1936, the North-West India Football Association, established in 1932, formed the "Lahore Football League", where all local clubs in the region could face off each other frequently. Early attempts were also made to establish a football league in the region in the 1920s, by the Moghalpura Sports Association, however, never materialised.

The first season, 1936–37 Lahore Football League, was carried out with an impressive administrative display. The league was won by Old Boys Club, an outstation team, after playing fifteen games, winning fourteen, drawing once, and losing none. Government College and Chauburji Estate would secure second and third position respectively. The venue for most of the league's was held at the Minto Park.

With the ongoing momentum of the "North-West India Football Championship", and District football tournaments, football was significantly improved in the region. From 1937 onwards, the league was split into two separate divisions, in which the classification of the teams were split into two divisions, implementing a promotion and regulation system by the points earned by them at the 1936–37 Lahore Football League. The divisions termed as Lahore Football League (A Division), and Lahore Football League (B Division).

The 1940s saw the emergence of several teams, such as Raiders, Rangers, Bata FC, along with several more clubs. However, the league was still dominated by mostly college level or university sides, notably Sikh National College winning the league twice in 1942–43 and 1945–46.

=== Post-partition (1947–1960) ===
Following the partition of India in 1947. The North-West India Football Association was dissolved, and the league was picked up by the then newly formed Lahore District Football Association (LDFA), under the jurisdiction of the Punjab Football Association, which was affiliated with the Pakistan Football Federation. A new format was also introduced, where at the end of the league, a championship play-off match was held between the top two clubs to clash and emerge a final winner of the league. During this period, new and developed administrative structures were adapted, with the creation of the National Football Championship. As well as several players participating in the league, who would go on to represent provincial selections and Pakistan on the international level, such as, Masood Fakhri, Jamil Akhtar, Riasat Ali, M.N. Jehan, and so on, the league faced a massive increase in quality.

The 1949–50 league was won by Bata FC, the club dominated the league along with Olympians, Rangers and Raiders. Bata would defend the title as league champions the following season, with Raiders finishing runners-up. The next edition was won by Rangers. Olympians were named as league champions in the 1954–55 season, and also won the title in 1960–61. Bata Sports would again accomplish a back-to-back league winning season in 1958–59 and 1959–60 respectively, with star player, M.N. Jehan, finishing as the league's top goal-scorer in 1958 with 12 goals to his name.

=== Later years (1960–present) ===
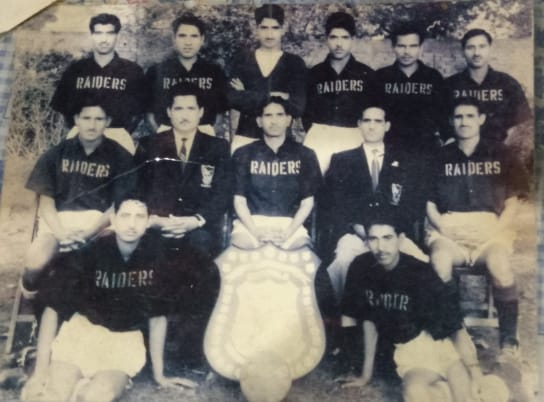
Raiders with the 1962 Lahore District Football League trophy.

The football league continued to produce extraordinary talent, and continued professional exposure to local players.

The 1960 edition was won by Olympians, who won the league on goal difference as the Olympians, Bata Sports, and Combined Military Hospital all finished with 27 points. The Burt Institute Ground was used as a venue of the league.

The 1961–62 Lahore Football League was won by power-houses Bata FC once again, the next edition was shared between Raiders and Rovers, with the former winning the coin toss and was awarded the trophy. The 1963 First Division League saw the both clash each other again, this time, Rovers dominating the game by 7–1 in the final. The Second Division League was also secured by the Usmania Club, defeating Muhammadan FC in the final by 2–1.

After a prolonged period of inactivity, the Lahore league was held again in 1998, at the Railway Stadium. The league was won by Wohaib, with Farida Club being runners-up. In 2008, Wohaib again won the league, defeating City FC in the final. The latter would secure the title in the next edition held the following year, where Mazhar Yaseen scored the winning goal in the final in the 79th minute.

In 2025, the Lahore District Football League was set to make a return as announced by the District Football Association (DFA) of Pakistan.

== Known champions ==
Year	Champion	Runners-up	Source
1936–37	Old Boys	Government College	
1937–1942	Unknown	Unknown	
1942–43	Sikh National College	Government College	
1943–1945	Unknown	Unknown	
1945–46	Sikh National College	Unknown	
1946–1949	Unknown	Unknown	
1949–50	Bata	Olympians	
1950–51	Bata	Raiders	
1951–52	Rangers	R.P. Mint Club	
1953–54	Unknown	Unknown	
1954–55	Olympians	Bata	
1955–1957	Unknown	Unknown	
1958	Bata	Olympians	
1959	Bata	Burt Institute	
1960	Olympians	Bata	
1961	Bata	Unknown	
1962	Raiders/Rovers		
1963	Rovers	Raiders	
1998	Wohaib	Faridia Club	
2008	Wohaib FC	City Club	
2009	City Club	Syed Maududi Institute Club	

== Notable players ==
Here are some prominent footballers, who participated in the league.

- (Pakistan) Masood Fakhri
- (Pakistan) M.N. Jehan
- (Pakistan) Jamil Akhtar
- (Pakistan) Riasat Ali
- (Pakistan) Muhammad Idrees Sr.
- (Pakistan) Niamat Ullah Durrani
- (Pakistan) Saeed Mirza
- (Pakistan) Muhammad Sharif

== See also ==
- Dhaka First Division Football League
- Football in Pakistan
