= Balasundra Vajravelu =

Indian footballer

Personal information
- Full name: Balasundra N Vajravelu
- Date of death: 28 June 2007
- Place of death: Bengaluru, Karnataka, India
- Position: Right winger

Senior career*
Years	Team	Apps	(Gls)
- Bangalore Blue
- Tata Sports Club, Bombay

International career
- India
- * Club domestic league appearances and goals

Balasundra Vajravelu (died 28 June 2007) was an Indian association football player who played in the 1948 Olympics.

== Honours ==
Mysore

- Santosh Trophy: 1946–47
