= G. Muthuraj =

Indian footballer

Muthuraj
- Born: 1 July 1927; Bangalore
- Died: 21 May 2006 (aged 78)
- Spouse: Padmavathy

G. Muthuraj (1 July 1927 – 21 May 2006) was a football player from Karnataka, India.

== Footballing career ==
Fondly known as Muthu, Muthuraj started his career as a defender with the Bangalore Mars in 1947. He also became the captain of the Karnataka state team and played for his state for nearly a decade. he made his international debut in an away series in 1953 against Myanmar (then called Burma).

He represented India at the 1954 Asian Games in Manila.

== Professional career ==
Muthu joined the 515 Army Base Workshop in 1950 and retired in 1962. From then on, he coached the Army team until he quit in 1990.

== Personal life ==
Muthuraj is survived by two sons, both of whom were footballers, and three daughters.

== Honours ==
India

- Asian Quadrangular Football Tournament: 1953
