= Sarangapani Raman =

Indian footballer

Personal information
- Date of birth: 1920
- Place of birth: Bangalore, Mysore State, British India
- Date of death: 11 January 1991 (aged 70–71)
- Position: Forward

Senior career*
Years	Team	Apps	(Gls)
- Mysore State Police
1953–1958	Mohun Bagan		

International career
1948	India	1	(1)
- * Club domestic league appearances and goals

Sarangapani Raman (1920 – 11 January 1991) was an Indian footballer who played for the Mysore State Police football team. He also represented India at the 1948 Summer Olympics.

== Playing career ==
Raman played predominantly as a striker, and was included in Balaidas Chatterjee managed national team squad ahead of the 1948 Summer Olympics. For preparation before the min tournament, India toured to Europe in July and played against few English clubs. He is best known for playing in the Indian national football team's first ever match and scoring independent India's first ever international goal at the 1948 Olympics against France. The match ended 2–1 in favor of France. This was also noted as India's first ever official match after independence.

In domestic club football, he played for Mysore State Police. He later moved to Calcutta Football League side Mohun Bagan and was part of the team that won Durand Cup in 1953 defeating National Defense Academy.

== Managerial career ==
Raman was one of the visionaries of women's football in the southern part of India, predominantly in Karnataka. During his coaching years, he scouted the national players like Chitra Gangadharan, Gayatri Ponappa and Brinda.

== Honours ==
Mohun Bagan

- Durand Cup: 1953

Mysore

- Santosh Trophy: 1946–47

== See also ==
- History of the India national football team
- India national football team at the Olympics
- History of Indian football

== Bibliography ==
- Kapadia, Novy (2017). Barefoot to Boots: The Many Lives of Indian Football. Penguin Random House. ISBN 978-0-143-42641-7.
- Martinez, Dolores; Mukharjiim, Projit B (2009). Football: From England to the World: The Many Lives of Indian Football. Routledge. ISBN 978-1-138-88353-6. Archived from the original on 2 July 2022.
- Nath, Nirmal (2011). History of Indian Football: Upto 2009–10. Readers Service. ISBN 9788187891963. Archived from the original on 22 July 2022.
- Dineo, Paul; Mills, James (2001). Soccer in South Asia: Empire, Nation, Diaspora. London, United Kingdom: Frank Cass Publishers. ISBN 978-0-7146-8170-2. Archived from the original on 25 July 2022.
- "Triumphs and Disasters: The Story of Indian Football, 1889—2000" (PDF). Archived from the original (PDF) on 13 August 2012.
- Majumdar, Boria; Bandyopadhyay, Kausik (2006). Goalless: The Story of a Unique Footballing Nation. Penguin India. ISBN 9780670058747.
- Majumdar, Boria; Bandyopadhyay, Kausik (2006). A Social History Of Indian Football: Striving To Score. Routledge. ISBN 9780415348355. Archived from the original on 29 June 2021.
- Bolsmann, Chris; Vahed, Goolam (2 November 2017). "'They Are Fine Specimens of the Illustrious Indian Settler': Sporting Contact between India and South Africa, 1914–1955". Journal of Southern African Studies. 43 (6): 1273–1291. doi:10.1080/03057070.2017.1379689. ISSN 0305-7070. S2CID 148862123. Archived from the original on 3 October 2022.
- Basu, Jaydeep (2003). Stories from Indian Football. UBS Publishers' Distributors. ISBN 9788174764546. Archived from the original on 11 October 2022.
- Cronin, Brian (19 July 2011). "Did India withdraw from the 1950 World Cup because they were not allowed to play barefoot?". Los Angeles Times. Archived from the original on 11 November 2022.
