= Mohammad Abdus Sattar =

Indian footballer

M A Sattar
Personal information
- Full name: Mohammad Abdus Sattar
- Date of birth: 1925
- Place of birth: Bangalore, British India
- Date of death: 23 April 2011 (aged 85)
- Place of death: Kolkata, India
- Position: Forward

Senior career*
Years	Team	Apps	(Gls)
- Bangalore Muslim Club
1949–1950	Mohammedan Sporting		
1950–1958	Mohun Bagan		
- Howrah Union

International career
- India

Managerial career
- Mohammedan Sporting
Medal record
Men's football
Representing India
Asian Games
Gold medal – first place	1951 New Delhi	Team
- * Club domestic league appearances and goals

Mohammad Abdus Sattar (1925 – 23 April 2011) was an Indian footballer. He was also known as Madar Abdus Sattar.

== Career ==
=== Club career ===
Abdus Sattar started his career with the Bangalore Muslim Club, before joining the Mohammedan Sporting Club in 1949. He signed for Mohun Bagan in 1950, winning the 1955 Rovers Cup with them.

=== International career ===
Abdus Sattar played internationally for the India national football team. After winning the 1951 Asian Games, Abdus Sattar went on to play one match at 1952 Summer Olympics.

== Later life and death ==
After retiring from playing, Sattar coached Mohammedan Sporting Club and under his coaching, Mohammedan won the Calcutta Football League in 1981, which is also their last CFL title until date.

Sattar was the recipient of Mohun Bagan Ratna award in the year 2008.

Abdus Sattar died from pneumonia in Kolkata on 23 April 2011, at the age of 85. He had been suffering from dementia caused by Alzheimer's.

== Honours ==
India

- Asian Games Gold medal: 1951
- Asian Quadrangular Football Tournament: 1953, 1954, 1955

Mohun Bagan

- Calcutta Football League: 1951, 1954, 1956
- Durand Cup: 1953
- IFA Shield: 1954, 1956
- Rovers Cup: 1954

Mysore

- Santosh Trophy: 1946–47

Bengal

- Santosh Trophy: 1949–50, 1951–52, 1953, 1955

Howrah Union

- Stafford Cup: 1964

Individual

- Mohun Bagan Ratna: 2008
