= Raiders FC Ground =

Football stadium in Pakistan

- Interactive map of Raiders FC Ground
- Location: Lahore, Pakistan
- Coordinates: 31.479985°N 74.311941°E
- Capacity: 1,000
- Surface: Grass

Tenant
- Raiders

Raiders Football Club Ground is an association football stadium in Lahore, Pakistan. It has serves as home ground for Lahore based club Raiders, and has hosted top-flight Pakistan Premier League fixtures, and numerous Lahore-level tournaments. It also hosted matches at the 2016 Pakistan Football Federation Cup.

== See also ==
- List of football stadiums in Pakistan
