= 1951–52 Santosh Trophy =

Tournament details
- Country: India
- Dates: September 20, 1951

Final positions
- Champions: Bengal (6th title)
- Runners-up: Bombay
- 60 minute matches

The 1951–52 Santosh Trophy was the 8th edition of the Santosh Trophy, the main State competition for football in India. It was held in 1951 in Cooperage Ground, Bombay, Maharashtra. Bengal won their fourth consecutive title.

== Final ==
30 September 1951

Bengal	1–0	Bombay
Venkatesh 50'	Report

Madras
Referee: P. S. Gopalan

== Squads ==
- Bengal : Sanjiva; B. Bose and Manna; Latif, Chandan Singh and Roy; Venkatesh, Guha Thakurta, Mewalal, Sattar, Nandy
- Bombay : Gurprasad; Vaidya and Papen; Shankar, Krishnan and Kenny; Perumal, Parab, Ferrao, Thomas and Verghese
