= Bangalore Muslims FC =

Bangalore Muslims Football Club is a football club based in Bangalore, Karnataka. The club emerged as one of the strongest in British India during the 1930s and 1940s, continuing its success after the partition.

== History ==
=== Emergence (1930s) ===
Mohammedan Sporting vs Bangalore Muslims in the Rovers Cup final.

The Bangalore Muslims football club emerged in the early 1930s, where they would participate in several local tournaments. In 1937, Bangalore Muslims enrolled into the 41st edition of the Rovers Cup. The team faced several tough opponents, but would ultimately reach the final, where they played against another power-house, Mohammedan Sporting. The final took place on 31st August 1937, with Laxminarayan scoring the winning goal in the 18th minute. This achievement led the club to become the first Indian club to win Rovers Cup, the second oldest football tournament in India. Due to this performance, several players, such as Masoom, Saboo, Habib, Rahmat, Abdus Sattar, were bought by Mohammedan Sporting later on.

The following year, the club regained the championship, winning back-to-back titles, becoming the first civilian team to defeat a British regimental side in the final. In that edition, they defeated the Argyll and Scottish Highlanders by 3–2.

=== Continuity (1940s) ===
In 1941, the club clinched the Stafford Challenge Cup title. The final was played on 24th May, with Decruz and Lakshman scoring for Muslims. The club also had the services of players such as Ahmed Khan, Mohammad Abdus Sattar, Mariappa Kempaiah. It was Bangalore Muslims that challenged the hegemony of Hyderabad City Police.

=== Decline (1960s) ===
In the 1960s, the trust that ran the team sold its share to Mumtaz Ali Khan's Al-Ameen. During the 1960s and 70s, football in Bangalore was dominated by the PSU teams such as Hindustan Aeronautics Limited (HAL), Indian Telephone Industries (ITI), Electronic Radar Development Establishment (ERDE) and thus drew the talent. This decline also affected Bangalore Muslims.

=== Later years ===
The team continues to exist in the lower divisions of the Bangalore Football League. It participates in the Bangalore District Football Association C Division Championship. It is mostly made of the Al-Ameen college players.

== Honours ==
- Rovers Cup
  - Champions (3): 1937, 1938, 1948
  - Runners-up (2): 1940, 1953
- Stafford Challenge Cup
  - Champions: 1941

== See also ==
- List of football clubs in India
- History of Indian football
