= Burt Institute Ground =

Sports venue in Lahore, Pakistan

The Burt Institute Ground is a public sports venue in Lahore, Punjab, Pakistan.

== History ==
=== Pre-partition (1913–1947) ===
After the establishment of the Burt Institute Hall in 1913. Its ground was also used for sport performances. From the 1910s and 1920s onwards, the ground was the home to several tournamets in the region. Regularly being the venue for the Lahore Trades Football Cup.

In the 1930s, Burt Institute also had an established football club, which also participated in local tournaments held in the region. While the ground held the De Montmorecy Football Tournament.

The following decade, the ground hosted matches of the "Punjab National Bank Golden Jubilee All-India Football Tournament". As well as the "M.D. Sheikh Football Tournament".

=== Post-partition (1947–1960s) ===
After the partition of India, the ground became the venue for its very own "Burt Institute Football Tournament", under the club's supervision. The hall's club was also still active, Notably, reaching the final of the "lqbal Memorial Football Tournament" in 1957.

By the 1960s, the ground was a frequent venue for majority of sport activities around the area, with the continuation of the "Burt Institute Football Tournament". Alongside being a ground for the Lahore District Football League in the 1960s, which the club also participated in.

In 1963, the ground was used for the Chinese Table Tennis team, against the Central Zone Table Tennis Association. Eventually hosting several Table Tennis Championships, and Badminton. While the club featured in local tournaments, until it eventually disbanded.
