= Tom Ossen =

Sri Lankan footballer, coach and referee

Personal information
- Full name: M. T. A. Ossen
- Place of birth: Kandy, Ceylon
- Position: Half-back

Youth career
- Dharmaraja College

Senior career*
Years	Team	Apps	(Gls)
- Young Stars SC

International career
1952–1958	Ceylon		

Managerial career
- University of Peradeniya
- Kandy Association Football League
- * Club domestic league appearances and goals

Tom Ossen, also known as M. T. A. Ossen, was a Sri Lankan football player who played as a half-back. He represented the Ceylon national team during the 1950s and captained the national on its tour of the Far East in 1958. Ossen also represented Young Stars Sports Club and Kandy in domestic football. After his playing career, he worked as a coach and became a FIFA referee. Ossen is regarded as one of the notable Ceylonese footballers of his era.

== Club career ==
Ossen was from Kandy and attended Dharmaraja College, where he played football. He later represented Young Stars Sports Club and Kandy. During this period, he was employed by the Kandy Municipal Council as a playground instructor.

== International career ==
Ossen began representing Ceylon in 1952 and was selected for the national squad for the inaugural 1952 Asian Quadrangular Football Tournament held in Colombo. He remained in the Ceylon squad for the 1953 edition in Rangoon, where, on 24 October, he scored in a 3–2 defeat against Burma. He was subsequently included in the Ceylon squads for the 1954 edition in Calcutta and the 1955 edition in Dacca.

Ossen later became captain of Ceylon and led the national side in a match against Madras XI before being chosen to captain the country in a tour of the Far East in 1958. Andrew Fernando served as his vice-captain. The Ceylon team travelled to China via Rangoon for a six-week tour. In China, Ceylon played seven matches between 19 April and 12 May 1958, facing representative sides from Kunming, Chongqing, Beijing, Nanjing and Shanghai, as well as Beijing Locomotive and Shanghai Red Flag. The team's only victory of the Chinese tour came on 10 May, when Ceylon defeated Shanghai Youth by 2–0. Ossen played as one of the team's half-backs during the tour. The other half-backs in the touring squad included M. P. B. Dissanayake, K. A. Premadasa, Eric Perera and M. A. Karunaratne.

== Post-retirement ==
After his playing career, Ossen coached the University of Peradeniya football team and the Kandy Association Football League. He also became a FIFA football referee.

== Career statistics ==
=== International goals ===
Scores and results list Ceylon's goal tally first, score column indicates score after each Ossen goal.

List of international goals scored by Tom Ossen
No.	Date	Venue	Opponent	Score	Result	Competition	Ref.
1	24 October 1953	Aung San Stadium, Rangoon, Burma	Burma		2–3	1953 Asian Quadrangular Football Tournament	
