= Motahar Ali Khan =

British Indian footballer

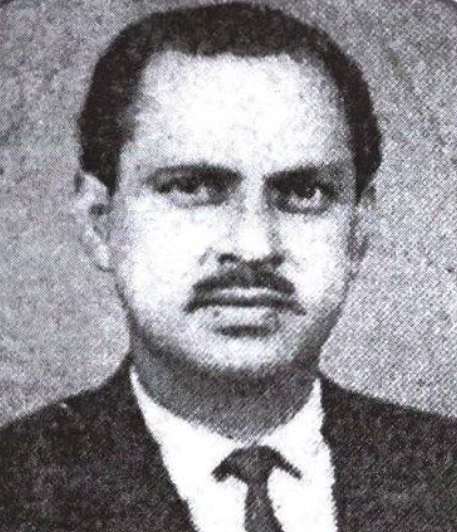
- Khan, post-retirement

Personal information
- Full name: Motahar Ali Khan
- Date of birth: December 1923
- Place of birth: Mymensingh, British India (present-day Bangladesh)
- Date of death: c. 2002
- Place of death: Unknown
- Position: Left-back

Senior career*
Years	Team	Apps	(Gls)
1937–??	Mymensingh Mohammedan		
1942–1944	George Telegraph		
1944–1947	Kolkata Mohammedan		
1948–1951	Dhaka Mohammedan		
1949–??	Quetta Mohammedan		
1953	Raiders		
- * Club domestic league appearances and goals

Motahar Ali Khan (Bengali: মোতাহার আলী খান; 1923 – c. 2002) also known by his nickname Phonu, was a footballer from East Pakistan, now Bangladesh who played as a left-back. He notably played for Kolkata Mohammedan from 1944 to 1947.

== Early life ==
Khan was born in December 1923, at Mymensingh, British India (present-day Bangladesh).

== Playing career ==
=== Youth career ===
Khan played college football at Islamia College, under his captaincy, Islamia College Football team in 1943 became the unbeaten champion of the Inter-College football league for the first time. He also appeared for first class football at Mymensingh for Mymensingh Mohammedan in 1937 when he was only 14 years old and a student of class VIII of Kishoreganj High School. The following year, he represented the team's Sub-divisional team against Mohun Bagan in an exhibition match.

In 1940, Khan enrolled in the Islamia College of Calcutta. The next year, he was selected to represent the University of Calcutta football team for their participation in the Inter-Varsity Football Tournament.

=== Senior career ===
In 1942, Khan joined George Telegraph and featured as a regular starter till 1944. The same year, due to his performances with the team, he was then recruited by the Mohammedan Sporting Club, but did not feature in majority of the team's matches.

In 1946, Khan played in an international junior match for India against the Europeans. The subsequent year, he was elected as the captain of Kolkata Mohammedan. The same year, he captained the Park Circus Club at the Roy Challenge Cup held at Comilla.

Following the partition, Khan chose to migrate to Pakistan, and joined the Quetta Mohammedan in 1949. He also captained the team the following year. When the club merged with Afghan Football Club, Khan remained as the captain of the newly formed team. He also captained and played for the Dhaka Mohammedan in 1948 and 1951. He was a member of the Mymensingh District team which won the Inter-District Football Tournament (East Pakistan) in 1951, and captained the team in the second-round against Dhaka District.

In 1950, Khan was selected to play for the Balochistan Reds for the Inter-Provincial Football Championship held at Quetta, helping the team win the competition for the first time. Khan would then go on to represent the Raiders in 1953.

== Other sports ==
Khan also played cricket for Mohammedan Sporting for some years. Alongside playing for the Baluchistan Cricket XI in numerous festival matches between 1949 till 1954, at Quetta.

== Honours ==
Kolkata Mohammedan

- Cooch Behar Cup: 1947

Balochistan Red

- Inter-Provincial Football Championship: 1950

Mymensingh

- Inter-District Football Tournament: 1951
