= Mazhar Siddique =

Pakistani footballer

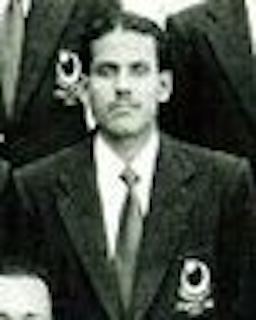
- Siddique with Pakistan in 1953

Personal information
- Full name: Mazhar Siddique
- Date of birth: Unknown
- Place of birth: British India
- Date of death: Unknown
- Place of death: Pakistan
- Position: Goalkeeper

Senior career*
Years	Team	Apps	(Gls)
1953–??	Pakistan Army		

International career
1953–1954	Pakistan		
- * Club domestic league appearances and goals

Mazhar Siddique (Urdu: مظہر صدیق) was a Pakistani footballer who played as a goalkeeper for Pakistan Army and the Pakistan national football team in the 1950s. He also served as lieutenant in the Pakistan Army.

== Club career ==
In 1943, Siddique first pIayed in Inter-Varsity Championship held at Aligarh. He also represented the Uttar Pradesh Sports Control Board the following year.

Starting from 1953, Siddique played for Pakistan Army team at the National Football Championship. He also captained the team on several occasions.

Siddique captained the Pakistan Combined Services football team that participated in the 1955 Army Football Tournament in Iran, which showcased army football teams from India, Iran, Turkey, Iraq, and Syria. The Pakistan Services team achieved victories against India and Iran, secured a draw against Syria and Iraq, but faced a loss to Turkey. Overall, they finished in the third position behind the Turkish and Iranian teams in the Army Tournament.

== International career ==
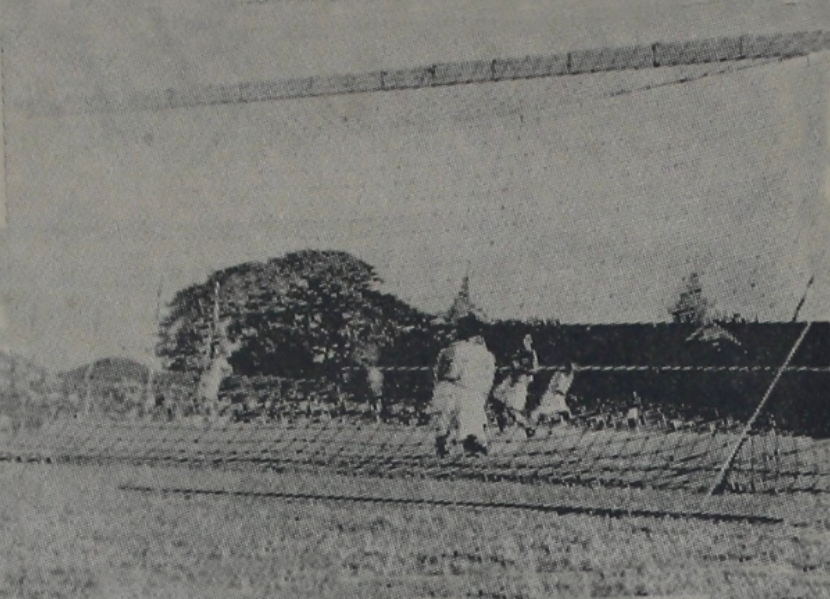
Siddique rushes out to catch the ball against India in an exhibition match after the 1953 Asian Quadrangular Football Tournament.

Siddique was called up to the Pakistan national team for the 1953 Asian Quadrangular Football Tournament held in Rangoon, Burma. He was also present with the team for the following 1954 Asian Quadrangular Football Tournament.

In 1954, Siddique was selected to represent Pakistan for their participation at the 1954 Asian Games, where he played against Singapore in a 6–2 win.

Before the tournament, Siddique played against a Singapore and a Singapore Selection XI, and was praised for his performances and saves throughout the matches.
