= Rangers FC (Lahore) =

Pakistani football club

- Full name: Rangers Football Club
- Short name: RFC
- Founded: c. 1940s
- League: Lahore District Football League

Rangers Football club was a Pakistani football club based in Lahore. Founded in the 1940s, the club was among the prominent teams in Lahore during the pre-partition and early post-independence period. Rangers Club also had the services of prominent players including Jamil Akhtar, Muhammad Sharif, among others.

== History ==
=== Early years (1940s) ===
The club emerged in the 1940s, and quickly established itself as one of the leading teams in the region. In the 1940s, the club, which was a part of the North-West India Football Association. The team participated in the Lahore District Football League, as well as several domestic tournaments.

In 1943, the club reached the final of the 11th edition of the North-West India Football Championship, organized by the North-West India Football Association, where they went up against Bata Sports Club, the final would result in a 0–3 loss for the Rangers Club. The following year, the team reached the semi-finals of the Lahore District Football Championship, but were defeated by R.T.C. Walton four goals to nil. The team also reached the final of the "Olympians Hot Weather Football Tournament", however, lost against the stronger side Bata Sports once again.

In 1946, the club avenged their loss from the previous year, securing the "Olympians Hot Weather Football Tournament", where they defeated Islamia College in the replayed final. Three years later, the club, alongside the likes of Muhammad Sharif, reached the final of the Lahore District Football Championship, where they secured the championship, defeating Bata Sports 2–1.

=== Local growth (1950s) ===
In 1950, with the addition of star forward Jamil Akhtar, the team was greatly strengthened, however, they did not achieve much, as they finished runners-up behind rivals, Raiders FC at the Iqbal Football Tournament. With the final taking place on 4 December 1950, where both teams competed against each other, with the Raiders taking the edge and defeating their Rangers 1–0 through a free kick. The subsequent year, the team won the Lahore District Soccer Championship. The club would then continue to participate in the Lahore District Football League.

In 1957, the club participated in the "M.D. Sheikh Football Tournament". They were eventually beaten by Olympians Club, allowing their opponents to advance into the quarter-finals. Later the same year, the team also competed at the Governor's Cup held at Murree, Punjab. On 23 August 1959, the club jointly won the Ronaldshay Shield alongside Dhaka Wanderers Club, playing out a goalless draw in the final held at the Dhaka Stadium. Wanderers earned the right to keep the trophy for the first six months through a coin toss.

=== Gradual Decline and later years (1960s) ===
In 1962, a new set of office-bearers were appointed at the annaul general meeting of the Rangers Club held under the chairmanship of M. Aslam Chaudhry, the meeting was held on 18 August 1962, the office-bearers elected were: M. Aslam Chaudhry as chairman, Mr. Aslam Khan, and Mr. Niaz as vice-presidents, with secretary being Fazal Akbar Baig, assistant-Secretary being Mr. Khushi Muhammad and treasurer as Mr. Ehsanullah. The following year, the club came runners-up in the league final behind Rovers FC, after a late winner scored six minutes before the end of the game.

The club would then go on to continue in tournaments held across Pakistan.

== Honours ==
=== Domestic ===
- Olympians Hot Weather Football Tournament
  - Winners (1): 1946
  - Runners-up (1): 1944
- Lahore District Football Championship
  - Winners (1): 1949, 1951
- Lahore District League
  - Runners-up (1): 1950
- North-West India Football Championship
  - Runners-up (1): 1943
