= Puran Bahadur Thapa =

Indian footballer (1928–2014)

Personal information
- Date of birth: 28 July 1928
- Place of birth: Upper Mawprem, Shillong, British India (now in Meghalaya)
- Date of death: 2014 (aged 85–86)
- Position: Midfielder

Senior career*
Years	Team	Apps	(Gls)
- 8th Gorkha Rifles
- Gorkha Brigade
- Services

International career
	India	?	(4)
- * Club domestic league appearances and goals

Puran Bahadur Thapa (28 July 1928 – 2014) was an Indian footballer who played for the India national team and the Services football team. He scored a hat-trick for the national team in a 3–1 win against Pakistan in the 1954 Asian Quadrangular Football Tournament at the Eden Gardens. It was the second hat-trick by an Indian footballer post-independence in international football after Sheoo Mewalal. Thapa died in 2014.

== Career ==
Thapa was an officer in the Indian Army and represented the Gorkha Brigade and Services in the Santosh Trophy and domestic tournaments.

== International goals ==
Scores and results list India's goal tally first.

No.	Date	Venue	Opponent	Result	Competition
1.	23 December 1954	Calcutta FC Ground, Calcutta, India	Burma	2–1	1954 Asian Quadrangular Football Tournament
2.	26 December 1954	Calcutta FC Ground, Calcutta, India	Pakistan	3–1	1954 Asian Quadrangular Football Tournament
3.	26 December 1954	Calcutta FC Ground, Calcutta, India	Pakistan	3–1	1954 Asian Quadrangular Football Tournament
4.	26 December 1954	Calcutta FC Ground, Calcutta, India	Pakistan	3–1	1954 Asian Quadrangular Football Tournament

== Honours ==
India

- Asian Quadrangular Football Tournament: 1954, 1955
