= Gordon Samuel =

Burmese footballer

Personal information
- Full name: Gordon Samuel
- Date of birth: 1922
- Place of birth: Burma, British India
- Date of death: Unknown
- Place of death: England
- Position: Striker

Senior career*
Years	Team	Apps	(Gls)
1950s	Customs		

International career
1952–1958	Burma		
- * Club domestic league appearances and goals

Gordon Samuel (born 1922) was a Burmese footballer who played as a forward. He played for the Burma national team in the 1950s.

== Early life ==
Samuel was born in 1922 in Burma province of British India. He belonged to the Anglo-Burmese community.

== Club career ==
Samuel was a part of the Customs team in the 1950s.

== International career ==
In 1952, Samuel was called up to the Burma national team for their participation in the 1952 Asian Quadrangular Football Tournament. The following year, Samuel would participate in the 1953 edition, where he scored a hat-trick in Burma's opening match at the tournament. He became the second player to score a hat-trick in the competition, after Sheoo Mewalal. The same tournament, Samuel would score against India in a 2–4 loss, this would crown him as the top goal-scorer of the tournament, helping Burma achieve a third-place finish behind Pakistan and India.

In 1954, Samuel was again selected for the 1954 Asian Games held at Manila, Singapore. In the tournament, Samuel would score in the group stages, against Singapore and Pakistan. The team would make it to the semi-finals, but failed to advance due to a 2–2 draw against South Korea. This game would result in an advancement for the South Koreans, due to them having a more superior overall goal-average than Burma.

Three years later, Samuel would participate in the 1957 Merdeka Tournament, Burma would fail to achieve any success in the main tournament, however, a separate tournament was fixed which included fixtures between teams that were eliminated from the earlier competition. In this consolation round, Burma would come in second place, with Samuel scoring against Thailand. Around the same time, Hapoel Petah Tikva, an Israeli football team which was touring asia, visited Burma as a part of their tour. Their last match of the tour was against the national team, in the match, Samuel managed to find the net in the 41st minute, helping his team win the match 3–2.

The following year, he was included in the squad for the 1958 Asian Games, in which he scored a goal against Indonesia in a 2–4 loss.

== Personal life ==
During the Second World War, Samuel served in the regular Burma Intelligence Corps, gathering information on enemy troop movements. After missing the evacuation from Burma, he trekked to India on foot over 17 days through a war zone. Following the war, he returned to Burma, where he worked as a customs officer. There he met Doris, whom he married on 29 December 1948.

In 1959, the family emigrated to England with £220, travelling by sea with their three young sons, Gordon, Walter, and Leslie, on a 35-day voyage. They initially settled in Tulse Hill, where Samuel worked as a clerk for British Rail. The family later moved to Thornton Heath, where they lived for decades. By 2008, Samuel and his wife had seven grandchildren and celebrated their 60th wedding anniversary.

Samuel was a supporter of both Arsenal and Crystal Palace football clubs.

== Career statistics ==
=== International goals ===
Scores and results list Burma's goal tally first, score column indicates score after each Samuel goal.

List of international goals scored by Gordon Samuel
No.	Date	Venue	Opponent	Score	Result	Competition	Ref.
1	24 October 1953	Aung San Stadium, Rangoon, Burma	Ceylon		3–2	1953 Asian Quadrangular Football Tournament	
2	24 October 1953	Aung San Stadium, Rangoon, Burma	Ceylon		3–2	1953 Asian Quadrangular Football Tournament	
3	24 October 1953	Aung San Stadium, Rangoon, Burma	Ceylon		3–2	1953 Asian Quadrangular Football Tournament	
4	31 October 1953	Aung San Stadium, Rangoon, Burma	India		2–4	1953 Asian Quadrangular Football Tournament	
5	4 May 1954	Rizal Memorial Stadium, Manila, Philippines	Singapore		1–1	1954 Asian Games	
6	5 May 1954	Rizal Memorial Stadium, Manila, Philippines	Pakistan		2–1	1954 Asian Games	
7	23 December 1954	Calcutta FC Ground, Calcutta, India	India		1–2	1954 Asian Quadrangular Football Tournament	
8	5 September 1957	Merdeka Stadium, Kuala Lumpur, Malaya	Thailand		5–2	1957 Merdeka Tournament	
9	25 May 1958	Tokyo, Japan	Indonesia		2–4	1958 Asian Games	
