= Fazalur Rehman (footballer) =

Pakistani footballer

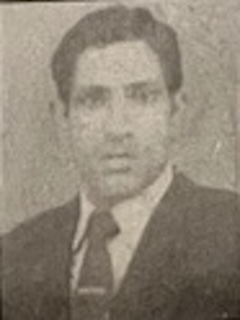

Personal information
- Full name: Fazalur Rehman Japani
- Date of birth: Unknown
- Place of birth: Peshawar, British India
- Date of death: Unknown
- Position: Goalkeeper

Senior career*
Years	Team	Apps	(Gls)
1946	Mohammedan		
1951–1956	Mohammedan		

International career
1954	Pakistan	3	(0)
- * Club domestic league appearances and goals

Fazalur Rehman (Urdu: فضل الرحمان) was a Pakistani footballer who played as a goalkeeper. He played for the Pakistan national team in the 1950s. He also played for Mohammedan Sporting.

== Early life ==
Rehman hailed from Jhanda Bazar in Karimpura, Peshawar.

== Club career ==
Rehman began his career with Peshawar-based Saiful Sarhad football club in the 1940s. He then joined Hilal Club Peshawar, participating in a tournament in Ambala with the team in 1944.

In 1945, he represented Young Men Peshawar in the Atatürk Tournament in Delhi. The following year, he toured South India with the Christian Club of Peshawar. The same year, he joined Kolkata Mohammedan, and also featured in an Indians and Europeans XI football match.

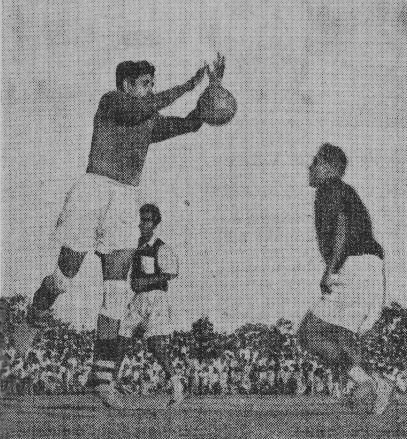
Rehman saving a shot in a league match between Mohammedan Sporting and Mohun Bagan in 1952.

After the independence of Pakistan, Rehman played in the inaugural 1948 National Football Championship with Punjab. He also played at the Rovers Cup in India with Lahore based club Raiders. From 1951 till 1956, Rehman returned to play for Kolkata Mohammedan. He later represented NWFP in the National Football Championship, and played for several Peshawar based clubs such as Heroes Club.

== International career ==
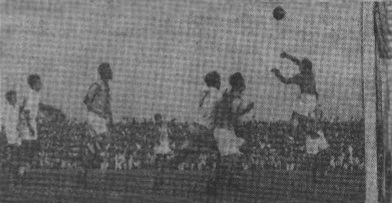
Rehman making a save against India at the 1954 Asian Quadrangular Football Tournament.

In 1954, Rehman was selected to represent the Pakistan national football team for their participation in the 1954 Asian Quadrangular Football Tournament. He played as starter in all the matches of the tournament against Burma, Ceylon and India.

In 1956, he was selected for the tour to Ceylon, Singapore and China. Rehman was injured in the first match of the tour against Ceylon Football Association XI ending in a 6–4 victory. This prompted the PFF to call up Wajeed Ali Miazi as a back-up goalkeeper.
