= 1936–37 Lahore Football League =

1936–37 season of the Lahore Football League

1936-37 Lahore Football League
- Old Boys team which won the league

Tournament details
- Country: British India (now Pakistan)
- City: Lahore
- Venue: Government College Ground
- Dates: 17 October 1936 – February 1937
- Teams: 16

Final positions
- Champions: Old Boys
- Runners-up: Government College

Tournament statistics
- Matches played: 120
- Goals scored: 322 (2.68 per match)

The 1936–37 Lahore Football League was the first season of the Lahore Football League, one of the earliest domestic football competitions in Lahore region during the British India period. The league was conducted under the North-West India Football Association. The league was won by the Old Boys, who finished the season as unbeaten at the top of the standings.

== Overview ==
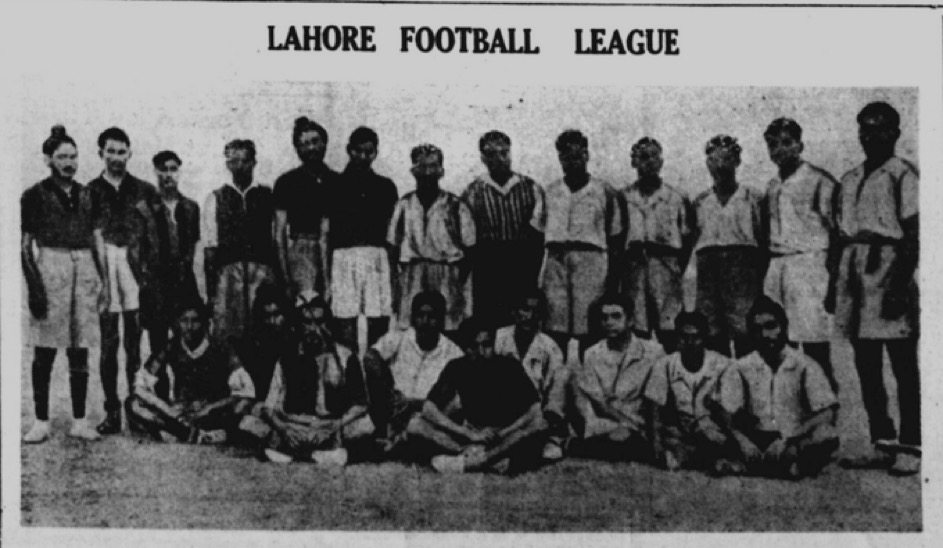
The Old Boys and the Dyal Singh College football teams photographed after a match.

The fifth edition of the league, organized under the supervision of the North-West India Football Association, began on October 17, 1936. This season was for the first time that the league would be won by an "outstation team", the Old Boys were announced as the champions of the league on 10th of February 1937. Alongside this accomplishment, the team also finished their season as Invisibles, winning 14 out of their 15 matches and drawing once.

== League standings ==
The final league table for the 1936–37 season was as follows:

Source: The Civil and Military Gazette (Lahore), 11 February 1937
Pos	Team	Pld	W	D	L	GF	GA	Pts
1	Old Boys	15	14	1	0	41	7	29
2	Government College	15	14	0	1	39	8	28
3	Chauburji Estate	15	9	4	2	30	15	22
4	Islamia College	15	9	4	2	27	16	22
5	F.C. College	15	8	4	3	17	6	20
6	Lahore Police	15	9	1	5	27	17	19
7	Medical College	15	7	1	7	22	31	15
8	Veterinary College	15	6	2	7	24	26	14
9	D.S. College	15	5	4	6	18	22	14
10	M. Engineering College	15	5	2	8	7	19	12
11	Chauburji Freshers	15	4	2	9	8	33	10
12	Mozang Muslim Club	15	3	3	9	16	26	9
13	Zamindar Club	15	4	1	10	13	30	9
14	D.A.V. College	15	3	3	9	5	20	9
15	Lahore Sporting (U.H.)	15	2	1	12	10	13	5
16	S.D. College	15	2	1	12	18	35	5
