= Muhammad Sharif (footballer) =

Pakistani former footballer

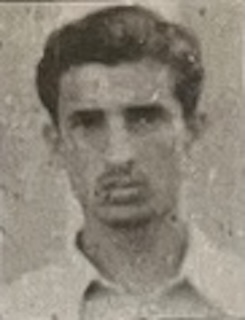

Personal information
- Full name: Muhammad Sharif Nathoo
- Date of birth: Unknown
- Place of birth: British India
- Date of death: Unknown
- Position: Forward

Senior career*
Years	Team	Apps	(Gls)
1940s–1950s	Rangers FC		

International career
1950–1954	Pakistan		(1)
- * Club domestic league appearances and goals

Muhammad Sharif Nathoo was a Pakistani footballer who played as a forward. He played for the Punjab football team throughout the 1950s, he was the third captain of the Pakistan national football team after Osman Jan and Abdul Wahid Durrani.

== Club career ==
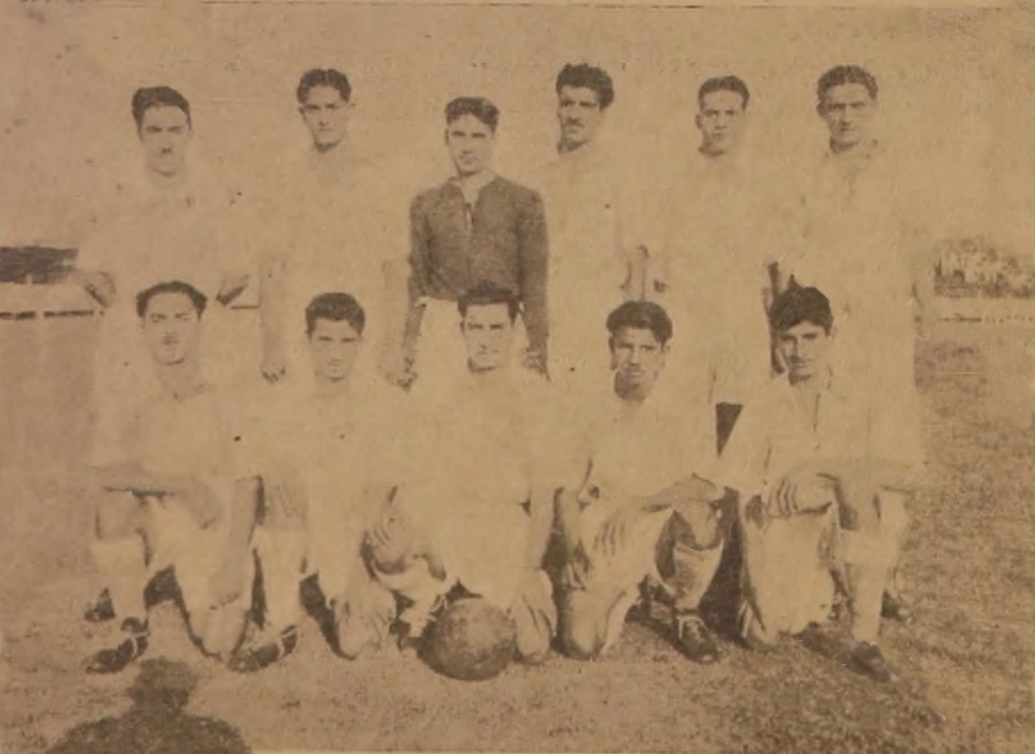
Sharif (second from left, sitting row), with the Punjab football team in 1952.

Sharif was member of Lahore based club Rangers at the Lahore District Football League. Sharif represented the Punjab at the National Football Championship in the 1950s.

In 1952, Sharif was contacted by Calcutta Football League side, East Bengal, who had acquired the services of Masood Fakhri and Riasat Ali. It remains unclear whether Sharif made an appearance for the team.

== International career ==
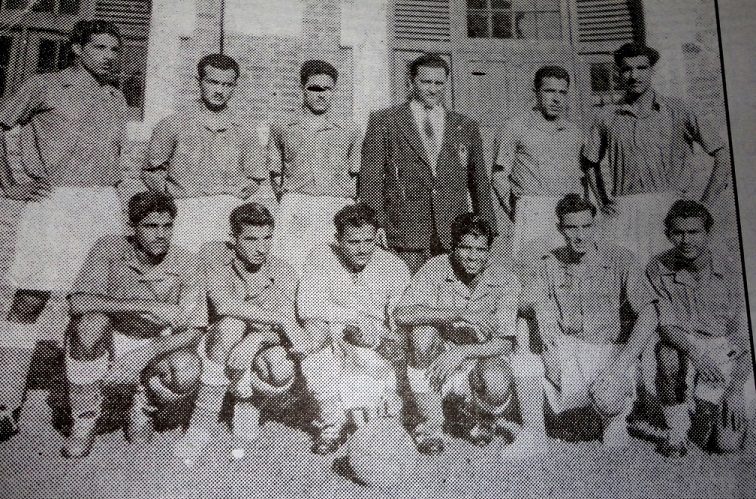
Sharif sitting second from left with Pakistan in 1953

Sharif was selected for the Pakistan national team's tour to Iran and Iraq in 1950. Two years later, he was again selected for the 1952 Asian Quadrangular Football Tournament held in Ceylon. He would go on to score against Burma in the 45th minute.

In 1953, Sharif captained the team for the 1953 Asian Quadrangular Football Tournament. The following year, he was included in the Pakistan squad for the 1954 Asian Games.

== Career statistics ==
=== International goals ===
Scores and results list Pakistan's goal tally first, score column indicates score after each Sharif goal.

List of international goals scored by Muhammad Sharif
No.	Date	Venue	Opponent	Score	Result	Competition	Ref.
1	20 March 1952	Colombo Oval, Colombo, Ceylon	Burma	1–0	1–0	1952 Asian Quadrangular Football Tournament	

== Honours ==
- National Football Championship
  - Winners: 1952, 1953, 1954, 1955

== See also ==
- List of Pakistan national football team captains
