= North-West India Football Association =

Former football governing body in India

- Sport: Football
- Abbreviation: NWIFA
- Founded: March 1932; 94 years ago
- Headquarters: Lahore
- Closure date: 1947; 79 years ago

The North-West India Football Association (NWIFA), was a football governing body in British India, encompassing football control in Punjab, NWFP, Sind, Baluchistan and Delhi. It was headquartered in Lahore. It also sent state teams for the Santosh Trophy.

== History ==
A movement to form a separate football association in North Western India was initiated by Wing Commander Hamid Ali Soofi in November 1931, aiming to promote football activity in the region. In March 1932, the North-West India Football Association was established, headquartered in Lahore, and encompassing control in Punjab, NWFP, Sind, Balochistan and Delhi. Sikandar Hayat Khan was elected president and Hamid Ali Soofi was elected honorary secretary. On 23 June 1937, NWIFA became one of the nine regional football associations to become affiliated with the newly formed All India Football Federation.

Later on, several regions detached and formed their own associations. Sind Football Association was formed in July 1937, and the NWFP Football Association was founded in August 1937. After the partition of India and the subsequent division of Punjab between India and Pakistan, the East Punjab Football Association was established in India, and the West Punjab Football Association was established in Pakistan. The last honorary secretary of the North-West India Football Association since 1942, Khawaja Riaz Ahmed, continued his position as honorary secretary in the West Punjab Football Association in Pakistan. Hamid Ali Soofi also became the first honorary secretary of the Pakistan Football Federation.

== State teams ==
The North-West India Football Association (NWIFA) football team also competed in the Santosh Trophy.

=== 1941–42 Santosh Trophy ===
- Ismail Jan, Gurdip Singh, Ramzan, Faiz, Siraj-ud-Din, Karim Nawaz, Munir, Iftikhar, Zahur, Abdul Wahid Durrani, Hassan, Fakhru, Abdur Rahman, Akhtar.

=== 1945–46 Santosh Trophy ===
- Yaqub, Hughes, Nasir, Ibrar Hussain Bali, Saeed Mirza, Yahya Jan, Ghulam Muhammad, Arshad, Zakria, Akbar Jan, Gilbert, Abdul Rahim, Ata (Note: full name, Ataullah), Amjad, Hussain Ali, Munir.

=== 1946–47 Santosh Trophy ===
- Attah Ullah, Saeed Mirza, Abdul Rahman, Badri Narain, Akmal Leghari, Hamid-ul-Haq, Hussain Ali, Niaz Ali, Haroon, Karim Bakhsh, Mohammad Amin, S. N. Dutta, Abdul Rahim, A. W. Qazi, Mohammad Aslam.

== Office bearers ==
=== Presidents ===
President	Term
Sikandar Hayat Khan	1932 – 1935
Khan Bahadur Nawab Muzaffar Khan	1935 – 1938
Dr. H.B. Dunnicliff	1938 – 1939
Khan Bahadur Muhammad Sheikh	1939 – 1942
Khan Bahadur Mian Afzal Hussain	1942 – 1947

=== Honorary Secretaries ===
Honorary Secretary	Term
Hamid Ali Soofi	1932 – 1942
Khawaja Riaz Ahmed	1942 – 1947

== Competitions ==
=== North-West India Football Championship ===
The association organised several editions of the North-West India Football Championship, open to teams from Punjab, NWFP, Sindh, Balochistan and Delhi. The winners were awarded the Harper Nelson Challenge Cup, and the runners-up were awarded the Rambhajdatt Chaudhary Memorial Challenge Cup.

Edition	Year	Champion	Score	Runner-up	Ref.
1	1932–1933	Headquarter Wing, East Surrey Regiment	1–1 N/A (replayed final)	Shining Club (Kohat)	
2	1933–1934	A Company, East Surrey Regiment	N/A	Headquarter Wing, East Surrey Regiment	
3	1935	Mozang Club	3–2	North-Western Railway Workshops	
4	1936	United Hands FC	3–0	A Company The Royal Scots	
5	1937	Shining Club (Kohat)	1–0	Government College (Lahore)	
6	1938				
7	1939				
8	1940	C Company DCLI	2–1	Government College (Lahore)	
9	1941	Government College (Lahore)	2–0	B Company	
10	1942	Olympians Club (Lahore)	5–0	Mozang Muslims	
11	1943	Batapur Club/Bata Sports	3–0	Rangers FC	
12	1944	Bata Sports Club	1–1 3–2 (replayed final)	DFA Jullundur	
13	1945				
14	1946				
15	1947				

=== Lahore Football League ===
The North-West India Frontier Province also established a Lahore Football League, which was founded in 1936. With it's first season being won by the Old Boys. From 1937 onwards, it was divided in two divisions.
