= Riasat Ali =

Pakistani former footballer

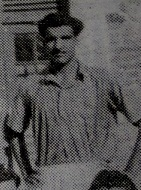
- Riasat in 1953

Personal information
- Full name: Chaudhry Riasat Ali
- Place of birth: Punjab, British India
- Place of death: Pakistan
- Position: Defender

Senior career*
Years	Team	Apps	(Gls)
??–1957	Sutlej Cotton Mills		
1952	East Bengal		
1958–??	Colony Textile Mills		
1950s	Bata FC		

International career
1953–1958	Pakistan		
- * Club domestic league appearances and goals

Riasat Ali (Urdu: ریاضت علی) was a Pakistani footballer who played as a defender. He is also remembered as one of the most prominent players of the Pakistan national team during the 1950s, captaining the national side in 1956.

== Club career ==
Riasat played for Okara based departmental side Sutlej Cotton Mills till 1957. After 1958, he played for Multan based Colony Textile Mills. He also represented the Punjab football team selection at the National Football Championship from 1948 till the late 1950s, captaining the team on several occasions, as well as being an important player for the team's success in the 1950s. Riasat also played for Bata Sports Club at the Lahore District Football League.

In 1952, Riasat would join Calcutta Football League side East Bengal alongside fellow national team player Masood Fakhri for a single season.

== International career ==
Riasat was called up to the Pakistan national team for the 1953 Asian Quadrangular Football Tournament which was held in Burma. He also played for Pakistan in the 1954, and 1955 editions of the tournament.

In 1954, Riasat participated in the 1954 Asian Games with the national team, where he featured against Singapore and Burma. In 1956, Riasat was appointed as the captain of the national team for their far eastern tour to Ceylon, Singapore and China. He also played at the 1958 Asian Games.

== Post-retirement ==
Riasat served as coach after retirement as a player, and helped produce players such as Haroon Yousaf.

== Honours ==
=== Punjab ===
- National Football Championship
  - Winners (6): 1952, 1953, 1954, 1955, 1957, 1958

=== East Bengal ===
- Calcutta League:
  - Winners (1): 1952
- Durand Cup:
  - Winners (1): 1952
- DCM Trophy:
  - Winners (1): 1952

== See also ==
- List of Pakistan national football team captains
