= Stafford Challenge Cup =

- Organising body: Karnataka State Football Association (KSFA)
- Founded: 1938; 87 years ago
- Region: India
- Number of teams: various
- Current champions: Bengaluru United (1st title)
- Television broadcasters: FanCode
- 2023

The Stafford Challenge Cup is an Indian football tournament held in Karnataka, organized by the Karnataka State Football Association (KSFA). Instituted in 1938, it is the oldest football tournament in South India. The tournament was abolished in 1993, but was revived in 2023.

== History ==
The Stafford Challenge Cup was introduced by Staffordshire Regiment in 1938 in Bengaluru. They also donated the silver rolling trophy. Bangalore Muslim Club was the first Indian club to win it in 1941.

In 1990, the Iraqi Olympic team won the tournament but didn't return the trophy since the cup was lost during the Gulf War. It was held for the then-last time in 1993, before the revival 30 years later.

== Venue ==
The older edition matches used to be held at M. Chinnaswamy Stadium and Vyalikaval Ground. The revived edition is held at Bangalore Football Stadium.

== Awards ==
Award name	Prize money
Champions	₹ 2,50,000
Runners-up	₹ 1,50,000

== Results ==
Year	Winners	Score	Runners-up	Notes
1938	(United Kingdom) Wiltshire Regiment			
1939	(United Kingdom) Wiltshire Regiment			
1941	Bangalore Muslim Club		Hyderabad City Police	
1942	Bangalore Sporting			
1943	Mysore Rovers			
1944	Sullivan Police			
1945	Sullivan Police			
1946	Sullivan Police			
1947	Sullivan Police			
1948	Sullivan Police			
1949	Sullivan Police			
1952	Hindustan Aeronautics Limited			
1954	Binny Mills			
1956	Bangalore Blues			
1957	LRDE			
1958	Mysore State Police			
1961	Mysore State Police			
1964	Howrah Union			
1966	MEG & C			
1967	CIL			
1968	Mohammedan Sporting			
1970	Mohammedan Sporting			
1971	CIL			
1972	Orkay Mills	1–0	A.S.C. Centre (South), Bangalore	
1973	Vasco			
1974	Orkay Mills			
1975	Dempo and Orkay Mills (joint winners) – 0–0			
1979	Dempo	2–0	ITI	
1980	(Iraq) Al-Shabab	4–2	ITI	
1981	East Bengal and Mohammedan Sporting (joint winners)			
1982	(Iraq) Al-Quwa Al-Jawiya	1–0	Mohun Bagan	
1984	(Iraq) Al-Talaba	3–0	Salgaocar	
1986	East Bengal		Dempo	
1987	Salcete FC			
1990	Iraq Olympic			
1991	Mohammedan Sporting			
1993	ITI	2–1	Union Bank of India, Mumbai	
1994–2022	Tournament not held			
2023	Bengaluru United	2–1	Chennaiyin (R)	
