= Old Boys FC =

Pakistani football club

Old Boys
- Full name: Old Boys Football Club
- Founded: 1920s
- Dissolved: Unknown
- League: Lahore District Football League

The Old Boys Football Club, is one of the oldest and most earliest prominent teams of the Lahore region. The club was also the first private club in Lahore.

== History ==
In 1918, a group of young schoolboys who would occasionally gather at the Minto Park, where they would play football on a regular basis. Later on, this would eventually lead to the formation of the "Old Boys". The club was also the first private club in Lahore.

In 1929, the club entered the Durand Cup. However, it remains unclear whether the club travelled for the tournament or not.

The club hosted a football tournament in aid of residents affected by the 1935 Quetta earthquake.

The Old Boys team which won the first edition of the Lahore District Football League.

In 1936, the club took part in the 1936–37 Lahore Football League, which they won after playing fifteen games, winning fourteen, drawing once, and losing none, becoming league champions with 29 points.

In 1938, the club took part in the "De Montmorency Junior Football Tournament", "King George V Memorial Football Tournament", and the "Iqbal Football Tournament".

The club was eventually disbanded and discontinued its football operations.

== Honours ==
- Lahore Football League:
  - Winners (1): 1936–37
