= Saeed Mirza (footballer) =

Pakistani footballer and manager

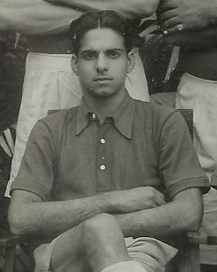
- Mirza in 1946

Personal information
- Full name: Saeed Baig Mirza
- Date of birth: 22 November 1922
- Place of birth: Lahore, British India
- Date of death: 21 November (year unknown)
- Place of death: Pakistan
- Position: Defender

Senior career*
Years	Team	Apps	(Gls)
1935–1958	Olympians Club		
- North-Western Railway

International career
1950	Pakistan		

Managerial career
- 1959: Pakistan
- * Club domestic league appearances and goals

Saeed Baig Mirza (Urdu: سعید بیگ مرزا; born 22 November 1922), was a Pakistani footballer and manager. Mirza was part of the Pakistan national football team squad which toured Iran and Iraq during their international debut in 1950, and served as head coach of the national team at the 1960 AFC Asian Cup qualification in December 1959 in India.

== Early life ==
Mirza was born on 22 November 1922 in Lahore, British India.

== Club career ==
Mirza began his football career with Olympians Club of Lahore in 1935. He also played for North-Western Railway.

He represented the regional NWIFA football team at the 1945–46 Santosh Trophy in India. After the formation of Pakistan he represented Punjab in the National Football Championship.

== International career ==
Mirza was selected for Pakistan's inaugural national team, touring Iran and Iraq in 1950.

== Coaching career ==
After retirement as player, he would transition into coaching. In 1957, Mirza oversaw the selection of the Punjab football team for the National Football Championship. He again oversaw the training camp of Punjab in October 1959. Mirza was also involved in the field of being a referee, being a successful candidate in 1950. Mirza also served as coach of his former team, Olympians.

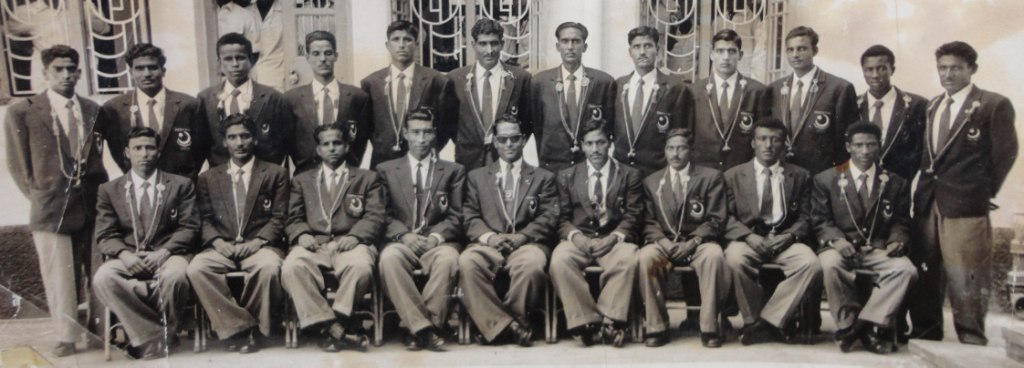
Mirza (sitting third from left) as head coach of Pakistan in 1959.

Mirza served as head coach of the national team at the 1960 AFC Asian Cup qualification in December 1959 in India, where Pakistan faced Iran, India and Israel twice each in the qualifiers. Although Israel managed to qualify by topping the group, Pakistan, under Mirza's coaching, achieved a memorable victory over Iran by 4–1 and secured a draw against Israel under his stint, finishing in third place in the group, ahead of hosts India but behind Iran.

== Death ==
Mirza passed away on 21st November.

== See also ==
- List of Pakistan national football team managers
