= Rovers Cup =

Association football tournament in India (1891–2001)

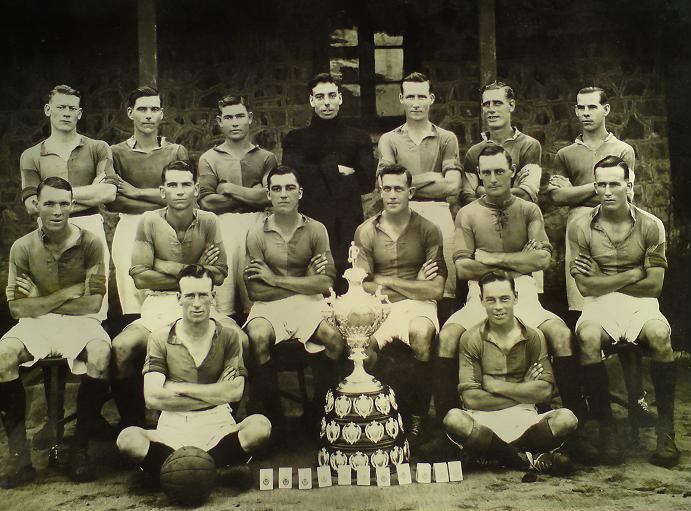
- 2nd Battalion of Middlesex Regiment after winning the Rovers Cup in 1926
- Organiser(s): Western India Football Association (WIFA)
- Founded: 1891; 135 years ago
- Abolished: 2001; 25 years ago
- Region: India
- Last champions: Mohun Bagan (14th title)
- Most championships: Mohun Bagan (14 titles)

The Rovers Cup was an annual football tournament held in India, organized by the Western India Football Association. Incorporated in 1891, it was the third oldest tournament in India after Trades Cup.

== History ==
Rovers Cup was incorporated by some British football enthusiasts in Bombay, Bombay Presidency, in 1891, as a form of amusement. After the foundation of Bombay Football Association (BFA) in 1902, the tournament became well organized. Patronised by Justice Russell, the tournament was firstly opened to British teams. Later in 1911, Western India Football Association was founded as a result of merger between BFA and Rovers Cup Committee. After justice Russel became president and P. R. Cadell became vice-president of WIFA, Indian clubs were given opportunity to participate, and Bengal United (a squad formed with Indian soldiers serving in British battalions) became first Indian team to compete. The tournament was suspended from 1914 to 1920 due to the World War I. Some legendary players from Great Britain, including Arsenal winger Denis Compton, Scottish international Tommy Walker and English international Bobby Langton appeared in the tournament in mid-20th century with visiting overseas teams.

A predecessor edition was held in 1890, where the First Worcester Regiment and its band and drums section participated. The First Worcester Regiment became first team to clinch the title in 1891. Mohun Bagan became the first non-army civilian club in the tournament to compete in 1923 and achieved runners-up position, after their 4–1 defeat to Durham Light Infantry. Mohammedan Sporting from Calcutta became the first Indian club to win title, when they defeated Bangalore Muslims 1–0 in 1940. Mohammedan later won 1956, 1959, 1980, 1984 and 1987 editions. In the 1950s, Syed Abdul Rahim managed Hyderabad City Police formed their supremacy, winning Rovers Cup consecutively from 1950 to 1954. In modern era, Iraqi club Salahaddin became the first foreign side to win trophy, when they defeated Mohammedan Sporting 2–1 in 1982. In 1958, Caltex Sports Club had the honor of becoming the first local team to win it, and Bengal Mumbai is the last local team to win title. The championship was last time held in the 2000–01 season, when Mohun Bagan beat Churchill Brothers by 2–0 in the final.

After the inception of the National Football League, the Rovers Cup started facing problems. With huge costs and sponsorship deals issues, the tournament was finally dissolved in 2001. In 2007, the WIFA announced that they were making attempts to revive the tournament.

== Venue ==
The primary venue of the tournament was Cooperage Ground in Bombay (now Mumbai). The stadium, built over hundred years ago, hosted each and every edition of the tournament.

== Results ==
=== Pre-independence era (1891–1947) ===
Year	Winners	Score	Runners-up	Notes
1890	(United Kingdom) 1st Battalion, Worcestershire Regiment	2–0	(United Kingdom) Band & Drums of the Worcestershire Regiment	
1891	(United Kingdom) 1st Battalion, Worcestershire Regiment	1–0	(United Kingdom) 2nd Battalion, Lancashire Fusiliers	
1892	(United Kingdom) 1st Battalion, Worcestershire Regiment	4–1	(British Raj) Bombay Rovers Club	
1893	(United Kingdom) 2nd Battalion, Lancashire Fusiliers	–		
1894	(United Kingdom) 2nd Battalion, Royal Scots	–	(United Kingdom) 1st Battalion, Loyal North Lancashire Regiment	
1895	(United Kingdom) 2nd Battalion, Royal Scots	3–0	(United Kingdom) 2nd Battalion, Welsh Regiment	
1896	(United Kingdom) 2nd Battalion, Durham Light Infantry	–		
1897	(United Kingdom) 2nd Battalion, Middlesex Regiment	1–0	(United Kingdom) 2nd Battalion, Durham Light Infantry	
1898	(United Kingdom) 2nd Battalion, Highland Light Infantry	–		
1899	(United Kingdom) 2nd Battalion, Royal Irish Regiment	3–0	(United Kingdom) 1st Battalion, Royal Fusiliers	
1900	(United Kingdom) 1st Battalion, Black Watch	2–1	(United Kingdom) 1st Battalion, Shropshire Light Infantry	
1901	(United Kingdom) 1st Battalion, Royal Irish Rifles	1–0	(United Kingdom) 2nd Battalion, Oxfordshire Light Infantry	
1902	(United Kingdom) 1st Battalion, Cheshire Regiment	1–0	(United Kingdom) 1st Battalion, West Yorkshire Regiment	
1903	(United Kingdom) 1st Battalion, Cheshire Regiment	3–0	(United Kingdom) 2nd Battalion, Royal Scots	
1904	(United Kingdom) 1st Battalion, Cheshire Regiment	2–1	(United Kingdom) 1st Battalion, Seaforth Highlanders	
1905	(United Kingdom) 1st Battalion, Seaforth Highlanders	1–0	(United Kingdom) 1st Battalion, Cheshire Regiment	
1906	(United Kingdom) 2nd Battalion, Royal Scots	1–1, 0–0, 1–0	(United Kingdom) 2nd Battalion, East Lancashire Regiment	
1907	(United Kingdom) 2nd Battalion, East Lancashire Regiment	3–0	(United Kingdom) 6th Battalion, Dragoon Guards (Carabiniers)	
1908	(United Kingdom) 2nd Battalion, Worcestershire Regiment	1–0	(United Kingdom) 2nd Battalion, Royal Scots	
1909	(United Kingdom) 2nd Battalion, Worcestershire Regiment	5–0	(United Kingdom) 1st Battalion, King's Own (Royal Lancaster Regiment)	
1910	(United Kingdom) 2nd Battalion, Worcestershire Regiment	1–0	(United Kingdom) 1st Battalion, Lincolnshire Regiment	
1911	(United Kingdom) 1st Battalion, Royal Warwickshire Regiment	1–0	(United Kingdom) 2nd Battalion, Loyal North Lancashire Regiment	
1912	(United Kingdom) 2nd Battalion, Dorsetshire Regiment	0–0, 1–0	(United Kingdom) 2nd Battalion, Royal Irish Regiment	
1913	(United Kingdom) 1st Battalion, Royal Scots	1–0	(United Kingdom) 1st Battalion, Durham Light Infantry	
1914–20	Tournament not held, due to World War I			
1921	(United Kingdom) 1st Battalion, Shropshire Light Infantry	1–0	(United Kingdom) 1st Battalion, Argyll and Sutherland Highlanders	
1922	(United Kingdom) 2nd Battalion, Durham Light Infantry	3–1	(United Kingdom) 1st Battalion, Shropshire Light Infantry	
1923	(United Kingdom) 2nd Battalion, Durham Light Infantry	4–1	(British Raj) Mohun Bagan	
1924	(United Kingdom) 2nd Battalion, Middlesex Regiment	0–0, 2–1 (a.e.t.)	(United Kingdom) 1st Battalion, Royal Scots	
1925	(United Kingdom) 2nd Battalion, Middlesex Regiment	2–0	(United Kingdom) 1st Battalion, North Staffordshire Regiment	
1926	(United Kingdom) 2nd Battalion, Middlesex Regiment	4–0	(United Kingdom) 1st Battalion, Gordon Highlanders	
1927	(United Kingdom) 1st Battalion, Cheshire Regiment	4–1	(United Kingdom) 2nd Battalion, Lancashire Fusiliers	
1928	(United Kingdom) 2nd Battalion, Royal Warwickshire Regiment	2–0	(United Kingdom) 1st Brigade, Royal Field Artillery	
1929	(United Kingdom) 2nd Battalion, Royal Warwickshire Regiment	4–0	(United Kingdom) 2nd Battalion, Duke of Wellington's Regiment	
1930	(United Kingdom) 2nd Battalion, King's Own Scottish Borderers	2–0	(United Kingdom) 2nd Battalion, Duke of Wellington's Regiment	
1931	(United Kingdom) 2nd Battalion, Royal West Kent Regiment	2–1	(United Kingdom) 16th Brigade, Royal Field Artillery	
1932	(United Kingdom) Royal Irish Fusiliers	3–1	(United Kingdom) 2nd Battalion, Duke of Wellington's Regiment	
1933	(United Kingdom) 1st Battalion, King's Regiment (Liverpool)	1–1, 2–2, 1–0	(United Kingdom) 2nd Battalion, South Staffordshire Regiment	
1934	(United Kingdom) 2nd Battalion, Sherwood Foresters	6–1	(United Kingdom) 2nd Battalion, York and Lancaster Regiment	
1935	(United Kingdom) 1st Battalion, King's Regiment (Liverpool)	2–1	(United Kingdom) 2nd Battalion, Durham Light Infantry	
1936	(United Kingdom) 1st Battalion, King's Regiment (Liverpool)	2–0	(United Kingdom) 1st Battalion, Shropshire Light Infantry	
1937	(British Raj) Bangalore Muslims FC	1–0	(British Raj) Mohammedan Sporting	
1938	(British Raj) Bangalore Muslims FC	3–2	(United Kingdom) 2nd Battalion, Argyll and Sutherland Highlanders	
1939	(United Kingdom) 28th Field Regiment, Royal Artillery	2–0	(British Raj) Howrah District XI	
1940	(British Raj) Mohammedan Sporting	1–0	(British Raj) Bangalore Muslims FC	
1941	(United Kingdom) 2nd Battalion, Welch Regiment	2–0	(British Raj) Mohammedan Sporting	
1942	(British Raj) Bata Sports Club (Calcutta)	3–1	(British Raj) Western India Automobile Association Staff	
1943	(United Kingdom) Royal Air Force	5–0	(British Raj) Bombay City Police	
1944	(United Kingdom) British Base Reinforcement Camp	3–1	(British Raj) Western India Automobile Association Staff	
1945	(British Raj) Corps of Military Police	0–0, 3–1	(British Raj) Albert David XI (Calcutta)	
1946	(United Kingdom) British Base Reinforcement Camp	2–1	(British Raj) Tata Sports Club	
1947	Tournament abandoned when the stands collapsed during the quarterfinal			^{1}

=== Post-independence era (1948–2001) ===
Year	Winners	Score	Runners-up	Notes
1948	Bangalore Muslims FC	1–0	Mohun Bagan	
1949	East Bengal	3–0	East Indian Railway	
1950	Hyderabad City Police	1–0	Aryan FC	
1951	Hyderabad City Police	2–0	WIMCO (Western India Match Company, Madras)	
1952	Hyderabad City Police	0–0, 1–0	Bombay Amateurs	
1953	Hyderabad City Police	2–0	Bangalore Muslims FC	
1954	Hyderabad City Police	2–1	(Pakistan) Keamari Union (Karachi)	
1955	Mohun Bagan	2–0	Mohammedan Sporting	
1956	Mohammedan Sporting	3–1	Mohun Bagan	
1957	Hyderabad City Police	3–0	Mohammedan Sporting	
1958	Caltex Club (Bombay)	3–2	Mohammedan Sporting	
1959–60	Mohammedan Sporting	0–0, 3–0	East Bengal	
1960	Andhra Pradesh Police	1–0 (a.e.t.)	East Bengal	
1961–62	Elec. & Mech. Engineering Centre	1–0	Mohun Bagan	
1962	Andhra Pradesh Police and East Bengal (joint winners) – 1–1, 1–1			^{2}
1963–64	Andhra Pradesh Police	1–0	East Bengal	
1964–65	Bengal Nagpur Railway	1–1, 1–0	Mohun Bagan	
1965	Mafatlal Mills (Bombay)	1–0	Mohun Bagan	
1966–67	Mohun Bagan	1–0	Vasco SC	
1967	East Bengal	0–0, 2–0	Mohun Bagan	
1968	Mohun Bagan	0–0, 3–0	Leader FC (Jalandhar)	
1969	East Bengal	3–0	Mohun Bagan	
1970–71	Mohun Bagan	0–0, 1–0	Mahindra United FC	
1971–72	Mohun Bagan	1–0	Vasco SC	
1972–73	Mohun Bagan and East Bengal (joint winners) – 0–0, 0–0 (a.e.t.)			^{3}
1973–74	East Bengal	3–2	Tata Sports Club	
1974–75	Dempo SC	0–1, 1–0	Tata Sports Club	^{4}
1975–76	East Bengal	1–0	Mafatlal Group	
1976	Mohun Bagan	0–0, 1–0	Mafatlal Group	
1977	Mohun Bagan	0–0, 2–1	Tata Sports Club	
1978–79	Dempo SC	2–1	Orkay Mills	
1979–80	Dempo SC	2–0	JCT FC	
1980	Mohammedan Sporting and East Bengal (joint winners) – 1–1 (a.e.t.)			^{5}
1981	Mohun Bagan	2–0	Mohammedan Sporting	
1982	(Iraq) Salahaddin FC	2–1	Mohammedan Sporting	
1983	(Iraq) Al-Jaish Army SC	2–1	Mohammedan Sporting	
1984	Mohammedan Sporting	1–0	JCT FC	
1985	Mohun Bagan	2–0	Salgaocar FC	
1986	Dempo SC	2–0	Mohun Bagan	
1987	Mohammedan Sporting	2–0	Mohun Bagan	
1988	Mohun Bagan	1–0	East Bengal	
1989–90	Salgaocar FC	1–0	Dempo SC	
1990	East Bengal	1–0	Mahindra United FC	
1991	Mohun Bagan	1–0	Mohammedan Sporting	
1992	Mohun Bagan	2–0	JCT FC	
1993	Mahindra United FC	0–0 (3–0 p)	Bank of India (Mumbai)	^{6}
1994	East Bengal	2–1	Air India FC	
1995	Oman Club	2–0	Sesa Sports Club	
1996	Salgaocar FC	1–0	Air India FC	
1997	JCT FC	1–0	Churchill Brothers	
1998	Bengal Mumbai FC	3–0	Central Railway SC	
1999	Salgaocar FC	1–0	Churchill Brothers	
2000–01	Mohun Bagan	2–0	Churchill Brothers	

Notes:

1. The tournament was abandoned when the stands collapsed during the quarterfinal between Mohun Bagan and 1st Bn, South Staffordshire Regiment
2. Joint winners after replay
3. Joint winners after replay
4. Replay after first match was abandoned at 84', with the score at 0–1, as Dempo refused to continue after having a goal disallowed
5. Joint winners
6. Penalty shootout

== Performance by teams ==
=== Performance by Indian teams ===
During its initial years, only British teams contested in the tournament. Mohun Bagan AC was the first Indian team to participate in this tournament on invitation in 1923, but they lost in the finals to Durham Light Infantry by 1–4 margin. The first Indian team to win this tournament was Bangalore Muslims, in 1937.

Statistics: Teams with at least 2 wins, (including joint wins)

#	Club	Win	Last win	Runners-up	Last runners-up
1	Mohun Bagan AC	14	2000–01	10	1987
2	East Bengal Club	10	1994	4	1988
3	Hyderabad City Police	9	1963	1	1943
4	Mohammedan SC	6	1987	9	1991
5	Dempo SC	4	1986	1	1989
6	Bangalore Muslims	3	1948	2	1953
7	Salgaocar SC	3	1999	1	1985

=== Performance by overseas teams ===
Overseas teams had often been invited to participate in Rovers Cup.

==== Winners ====
- (Iraq) Salahaddin FC (1982)
- (Iraq) Al-Jaish Army SC (1983)
- Oman Club (1995)

==== Runners-up ====
- (Pakistan) Keamari Union (1954)

== See also ==
- list of oldest football competitions
- Football in India
- IFA Shield
- Federation Cup
- Super Cup
