= List of foreign East Bengal FC players =

East Bengal is an Indian association football club based in Kolkata, West Bengal, which competes in the top tier of Indian football. The club was formed in August 1920 when the Jorabagan Club's vice-president, Suresh Chandra Chaudhuri, resigned. He did so after the club sent out their starting eleven with the notable exclusion of defender Sailesh Bose, who was dropped from the squad for undisclosed reasons when they were about to face Mohun Bagan in the Coochbehar Cup semi-final on 28 July 1920. He, along with Raja Manmatha Nath Chaudhuri, Ramesh Chandra Sen and Aurobinda Ghosh, formed East Bengal on 1 August 1920. East Bengal started playing in the Calcutta Football League, 2nd division, in 1921. In 1925, they qualified for the first division for the first time and since then they have won many Indian football titles.

East Bengal joined the National Football League (NFL) at its inception in 1996 and is the only club to have played every season to date, including those after the rebranded I-League succeeded the NFL in 2007. East Bengal won the National Football League in 2000–01, 2002–03 and 2003–04 and were runners up seven times, the most by any Indian football club. Among other trophies, East Bengal has won the Calcutta Football League 39 times, the IFA Shield 28 times, the Federation Cup eight times and the Durand Cup 16 times. The team has been one of the most successful in Indian Football. Since the independence of India, the club has attracted many foreign players and regularly featured big names from across the world, including some who have represented their nation at the FIFA World Cup.

This chronological list comprises all foreign players to have signed and played for the club since their foundation in 1920. Each players entry includes his nationality and season of first joining the club. There have been one hundred seventy five foreign players to play for East Bengal to date from forty-nine different countries, with thirty of them from Nigeria, the most from any single nation.

== History ==
=== 1920–1947: Pre-independence era ===
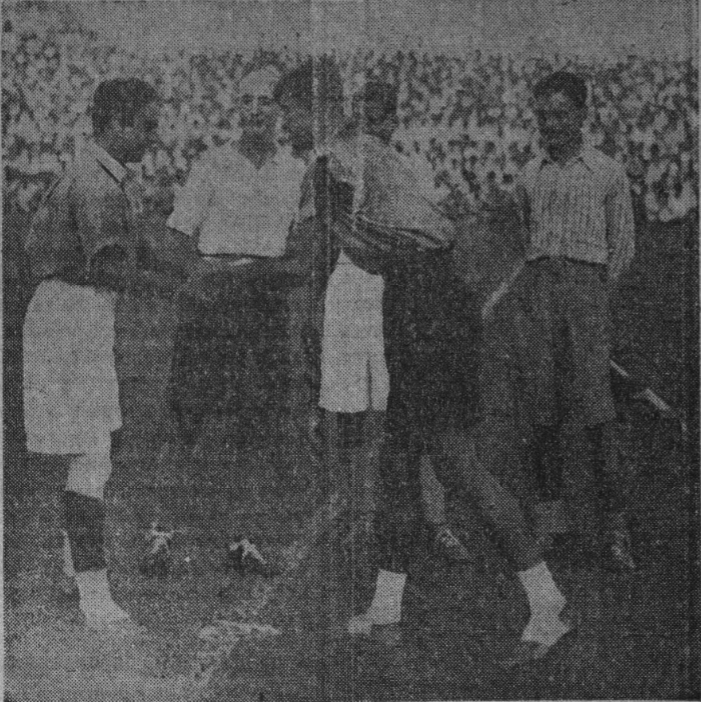
1945 IFA Shield Final – East Bengal and Mohun Bagan captains before the match, in which, Fred Pugsley scored the lone goal.

Since the 1940s, the East Bengal Club has had many foreign international players play for them. The earliest recorded foreign player was the prince of Nepal, Major General Madan Shumsher Jung Bahadur Rana, who donned the East Bengal jersey and played as a center-forward in an exhibition match against the Press Club Team on 4 July 1938. The first-ever foreign recruit to play a competitive match for East Bengal was Fred Pugsley of Myanmar, who joined East Bengal in 1942. Pugsley travelled 500 km (310 mi) on foot from Burma after the Japanese invasion and reached Calcutta, where he knew only of the East Bengal club, which had toured Burma a few years back. The officials immediately recognised him. Extremely ill because of the inhuman exhaustion he suffered while running away from his country, a frail-looking Pugsley asked East Bengal club officials to allow him to try out for their team. The officials were hesitant at first, but after providing medical care, Pugsley tried out and became one of the greatest forwards to play for East Bengal. In the 1945 season especially, with Pugsley the top scorer in the league with 21 goals, East Bengal won the Calcutta Football League and IFA Shield double. Pugsley scored the solitary goal in the IFA Shield final against arch-rivals Mohun Bagan. He scored 48 goals for the club and holds the unique record of scoring eight goals in a single match against B.B & C.I. Railway on 23 September 1945 in the Rovers Cup match—the most goals scored by an individual in a single match in Indian football to date.

=== 1947–1996: Post-independence era ===
In the 50s, during the reign of Pancha Pandavas, East Bengal signed Pakistani internationals Masood Fakhri and Riasat Ali in 1952. During his first season with the club, Fakhri helped his side win the Calcutta Football League, DCM Trophy and the Durand Cup. Fakhri scored the winning goals in his first two matches against East Bengal's biggest rivals, Mohun Bagan, and became a fan favourite among East Bengal supporters. Fakhri was part of the East Bengal side to play tournaments and friendly matches in Romania and the Soviet Union. In 1953, the Pakistan Football Federation (PFF) prohibited Pakistani players from playing in India without a permit, but East Bengal still fielded Masood Fakhri and Niaz Ali, stating they had received permission from the PFF. On 3 October 1953, in the 1953 IFA Shield final against the Indian Cultural League (I.C.L.) on the third replayed final, Masood Fakhri scored for East Bengal and the game ended in a 1–1 tie. The I.C.L. team lodged a complaint with the Indian Football Association (IFA) immediately after the match against East Bengal over their fielding the Pakistani players. On 11 October 1953, the IFA announced I.C.L. as the winners of the IFA Shield after East Bengal failed to produce a written permit for the Pakistani players from the PFF. The IFA suspended the East Bengal club from all football activities until 31 December 1954. East Bengal challenged this decision and took the IFA to court after receiving a letter from the PFF president, Dr. A. M. Malik on 25 October 1953, and had their suspension revoked. A few more Pakistani internationals like Tarapada Roy, Jamil Akhtar, Sumbal Khan, Abdul Haq, Moosa Ghazi, Hussain Killer, etc. played for the club in the mid-50s, with Moosa becoming the first foreign player to score 100 goals in Kolkata football. Moosa was the top scorer of East Bengal in 1956 and 1957 and scored a brace against Mohun Bagan in the 1957 Durand Cup final.

In the 60s and 70s, the club signed a handful of foreign players, including Selim Noor from Sri Lanka, who scored in his first match for the club against Mohun Bagan in the return leg of 1963 Calcutta League, Ruk Bahadur from Hong Kong and David Williams, the first Nigerian to play for East Bengal. In 1980, the club signed Iranian international Majid Bishkar, regarded as the greatest foreign player to play for East Bengal, who featured for the Iran national team in the 1978 FIFA World Cup alongside two other Iranians Jamshid Nassiri and Mahmood Khabaji. Majid earned the nickname "Baadshah" and was voted the greatest foreign player to play for East Bengal in 2019. In 1986, East Bengal signed their first Brazilian player, the former Vitoria and Botafogo player Manilton S. Santos, and later signed Nigerian midfielder Emeka Ezeugo, who went on to play for the Nigerian national team and featured in the 1994 FIFA World Cup. Emeka was instrumental in leading East Bengal to the 1986 IFA Shield title, including a famous 3–1 victory against Nigeria's Leventis United in the semi-finals.

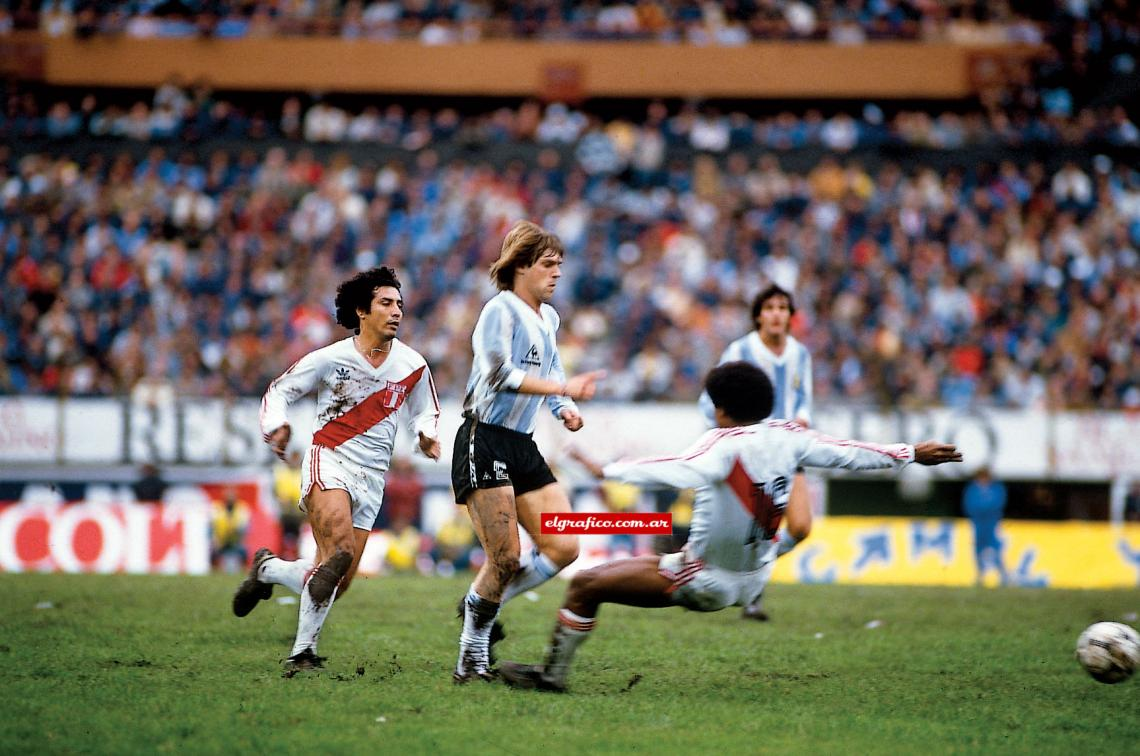
Julian Camino playing for Argentina against Peru in 1985.

The club signed the most prolific forward to have played for East Bengal, Nigerian Chima Okorie from Mohammedan Sporting in 1987. He scored 131 goals for the club in three seasons, becoming the top scorer in East Bengal's history, surpassing K. P. Dhanaraj, who had 127 goals, until this was crossed by Bhaichung Bhutia. The club signed former Arsenal and Norwich City defender John Devine in 1987. In 1988, East Bengal signed former Argentine international Julian Camino, who featured for the Argentina national side in the 1983 Copa América.

East Bengal recruited four Bangladeshi internationals including the captain of the Bangladesh national team Monem Munna, along with Sheikh Mohammad Aslam, Rizvi Karim Rumi and Golam Mohammad Gaus in 1991. The club recruited three British players, Steven Alan Prindiville, Neil Edmonds and Peter Maguire for the 1991–92 Asian Cup Winners' Cup.

=== 1996–2020: National League and I-League era ===
In 1996–97, during the inaugural National Football League season, the club recruited Ulf Johansson from Sweden, Dev Narayan Chaudhary of Nepal, Chima Okorie, and Kelechi Okorie—Chima's younger brother and former AFC Bournemouth and Kenyan international Sammy Omollo. In 1997–98, East Bengal signed Kenyan forward Toni Jose Oniyenga—a cousin of Sammy Omollo and Kenyan international Haggi Azande Abulista, only the second foreign goalkeeper to play for the club till date after Balai Dey in 1965. Omollo scored the solitary goal as East Bengal snatched a victory against J-League side Verdy Kawasaki in the 1997–98 Asian Cup Winners' Cup.

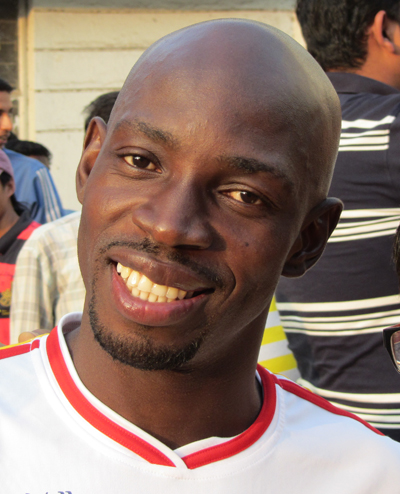
Uga Okpara in East Bengal, 2011

In 1998, the club recruited three Ghanaians, Suley Musah, Jackson Egypong and Emmanuel Opoku, the latter a former Ghana national team player. Opoku played for two seasons, while Jackson and Musah played together till the 2000–01 season when East Bengal won their first National League title. Jackson and Musah formed one of the best defensive pairings in Indian football history. They conceded just nine goals in 22 matches as East Bengal lifted the National League title in the 2000–01 season. Musah was the second foreign player to captain East Bengal club after Chima Okorie in 1990. During that period, the East Bengal club featured several Brazilian recruits like former Santos defender Douglas Silva, former Gremio forward Gilmar da Silva and former Vasco da Gama forward Cristiano Júnior, who became the top scorer with 15 goals as East Bengal lifted the 2003–04 National League title. In 2004–05, East Bengal signed Marcos Secco—brother of Douglas Silva—becoming the third foreign brother pair to play for the club.

In 2007–08, East Bengal recruited their third World Cup player, former South African international MacDonald Mukansi, who represented the Bafana-Bafana at the 2002 FIFA World Cup. The club also signed Edmilson Marques Pardal, Julius Owino and Bolaji Majek during this period. The prolific Ghanaian duo Yusif Yakubu and Ishmael Addo signed with the club in 2008. Addo had represented the Ghana national team and was part of the Ghana U-17 and U-20 teams at the 1999 FIFA U-17 World Championship and 2001 FIFA World Youth Championship.

East Bengal signed former CAF Champions League winner Uga Okpara from Enyimba in 2009. He was voted as the best defender of the 2012–13 I-League and played an instrumental role as East Bengal reached the semi-finals of the 2013 AFC Cup unbeaten. The club also acquired Tolgay Ozbey, and Penn Orji during this period.

In 2014–15, East Bengal signed their fourth World Cupper, former New Zealand international Leo Bertos, who represented the New Zealand national team in the 2010 FIFA World Cup. The club signed the prolific Nigerian Ranti Martins who scored 47 goals for the club in two seasons, winning the Golden Boot in both the 2014–15 and 2015–16 I-League seasons. East Bengal signed former Paris Saint-Germain and France national team defender Bernard Mendy, who had previously represented the France national U-20 team in the 2001 FIFA World Youth Championship, for a brief spell in 2015–2016. East Bengal recruited former Syrian international Mahmoud Al Amna who had previously played for clubs like Al-Ittihad in 2017.

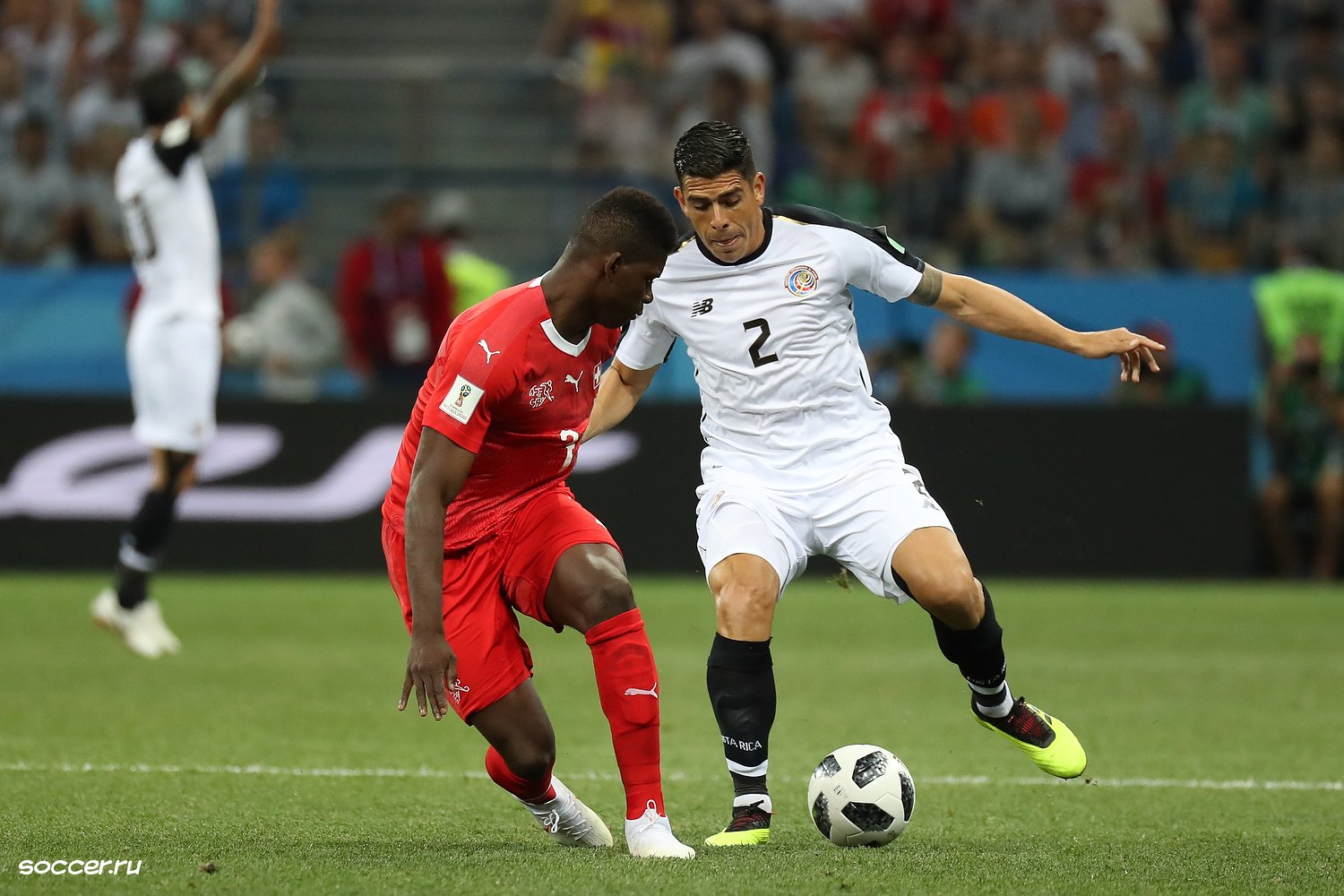
Johnny Acosta for Costa Rica with the ball in the match against Switzerland in 2018 FIFA World Cup.

East Bengal signed their fifth World Cupper, Costa Rican international Johnny Acosta, in 2018. He represented the Costa Rica national team in the 2014 and 2018 FIFA World Cup. Acosta scored on his debut on 2 September 2018 in the Kolkata Derby and helped East Bengal to a 2–2 comeback in the Calcutta League. The club also recruited Enrique Esqueda, who was a U-17 World Cup winner with Mexico and represented the Mexico national team at the 2015 Copa America, and Spanish defender Borja Gomez Perez, as they finished runners-up in the 2018–19 I-League. In January 2019, they roped in another former La Liga midfielder, Antonio Rodríguez Dovale, who had played for Celta Vigo. East Bengal recruited two more former La Liga players, Martí Crespí and Víctor Pérez, along with Spanish compatriots Juan Mera González and Marcos de la Espada in 2019.

=== 2020–present: Indian Super League era ===
The club joined the Indian Super League in 2020 and appointed former Liverpool Robbie Fowler as the manager and recruited former Premier League players like Anthony Pilkington and Danny Fox, along with EFL League One stars like Jacques Maghoma and Bright Enobakhare, and A-League players Scott Neville and Aaron Amadi-Holloway from Brisbane Roar and Matti Steinmann who had played for Hamburger SV in the Bundesliga. Matti Steinmann represented the German national U-20 team in the 2015 FIFA U-20 World Cup. Danny Fox became the third foreign player to be announced officially as the captain of the East Bengal club after Chima Okorie (1990–91) and Suley Musah (2003–04). In 2021–22 season, the club replaced all of the foreigners and announced the signings of Amir Dervišević, Tomislav Mrcela, Franjo Prce, Daniel Chima Chukwu, Darren Sidoel and Antonio Perošević. In the January window, the club had bought in three more players Marcelo Ribeiro, Francisco José Sota and Nepali international Ananta Tamang.

In 2022, the club after partnering with their new investors – the Emami group, announced the signing of five new foreigners for the season: three Brazilians — Alex Lima, Cleiton Silva and Eliandro, Spanish defender Ivan González and Cyprus national team defender Charalambos Kyriakou. In 2023, the club roped in a Spanish quartet: Borja Herrera, Javier Siverio, Saúl Crespo and José Antonio Pardo. The club also roped in Jordanian defender Hijazi Maher as they became part of the 2024 Indian Super Cup title victory. In 2024, the club roped in the top scorer of 2023–24 Indian Super League, Dimitrios Diamantakos of Greece along with French attacker Madih Talal. Later the club also signed Venezuelan Richard Celis and Cameroonian Messi Bouli. In 2025, the club roped in Palestinian national team midfielder Mohammed Rashid along with Brazilian midfielder Miguel Figueira, and Argentine defender Kevin Sibille. Along with them, the club also signed Moroccan international Hamid Ahadad who have previously played for African giants like Raja Casablanca, Wydad Casablanca and Zamalek.

== List of all foreign players ==
The list of all foreign players who have played for East Bengal as below:

Key

- † Players with this background and symbol in the "Name" column denote individuals who were foreign citizen during the time they signed but later became Indian citizen.
- ‡ Players with this background and symbol in the "Name" column denote individuals who were signed by the club but were not registered into the squad.
- A player name in **bold** signifies they have been capped by the national team.

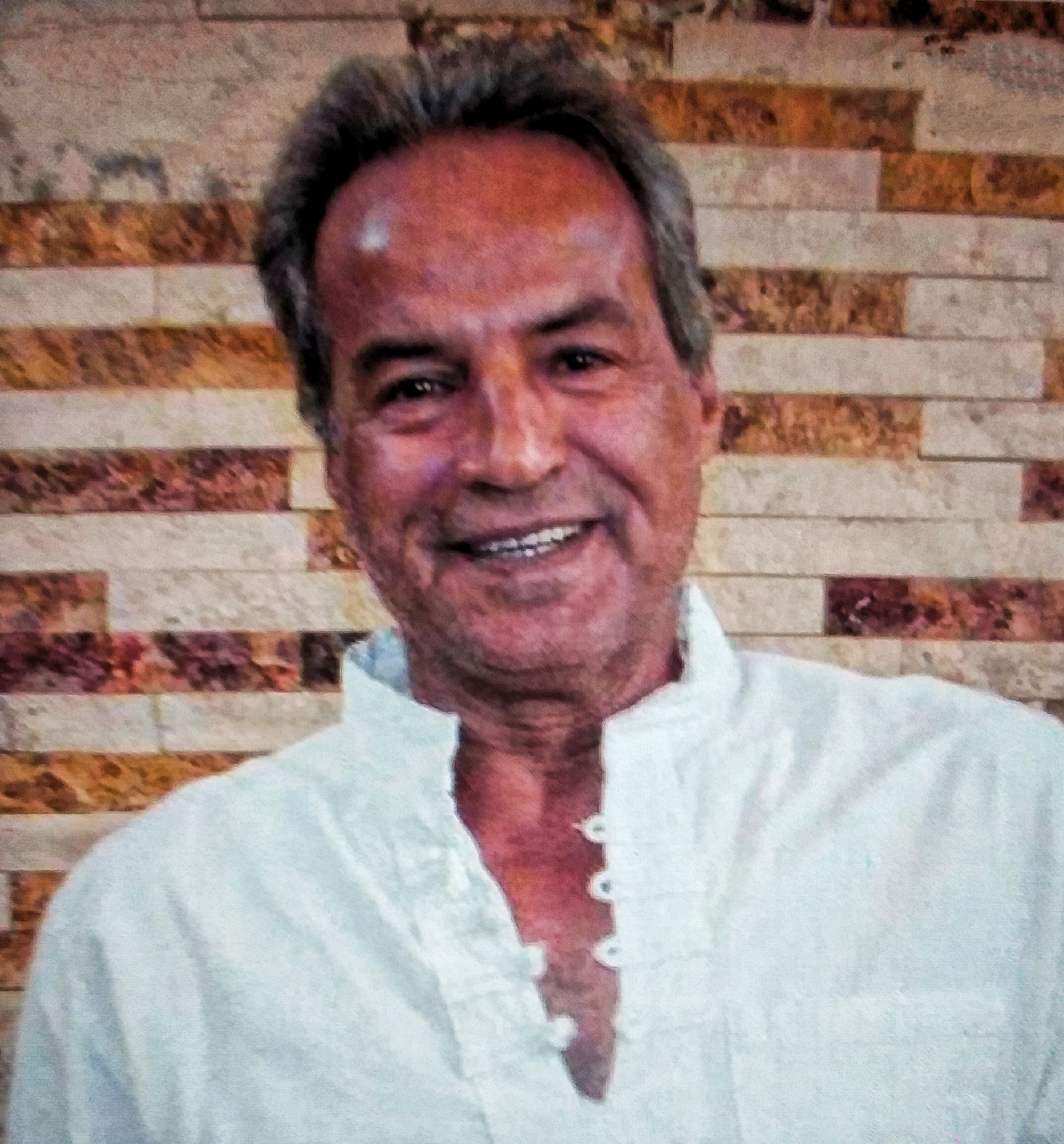
Majid Bishkar in 2018.

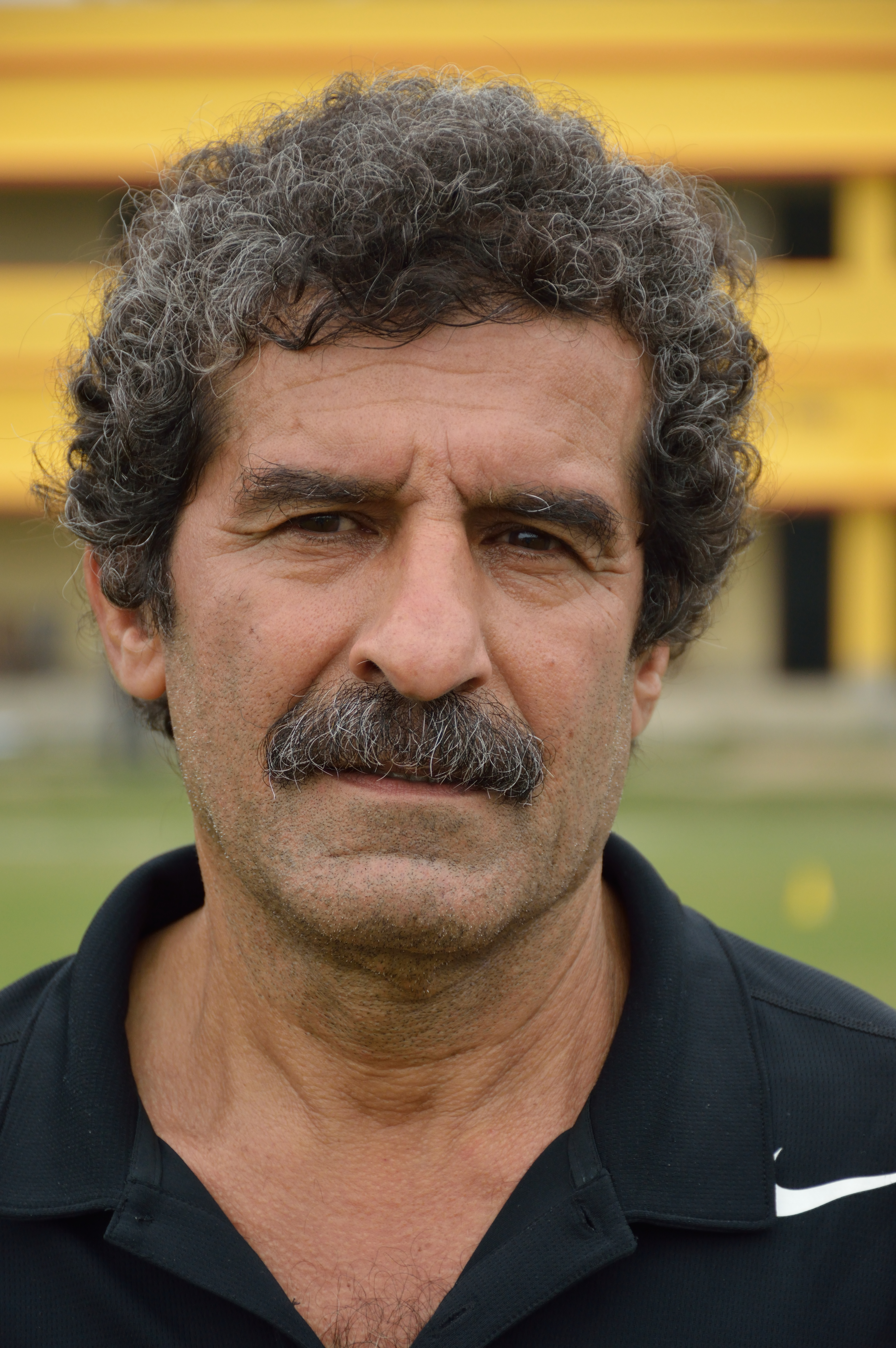
Jamshid Nassiri in 2016.

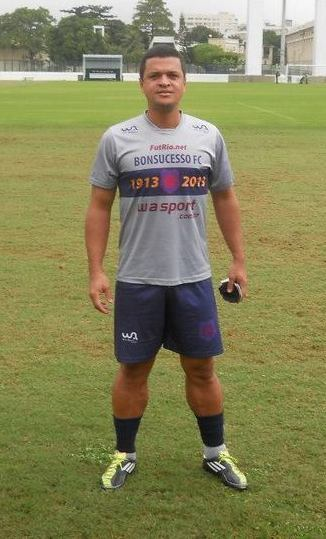
Edmilson Marques Pardal.

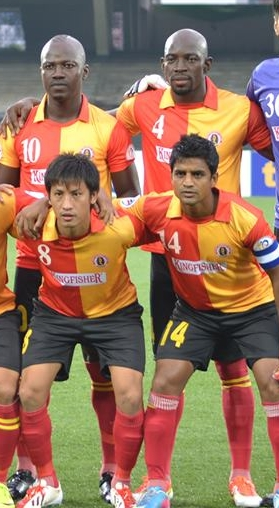
Uga Okpara and Chidi Edeh in 2013

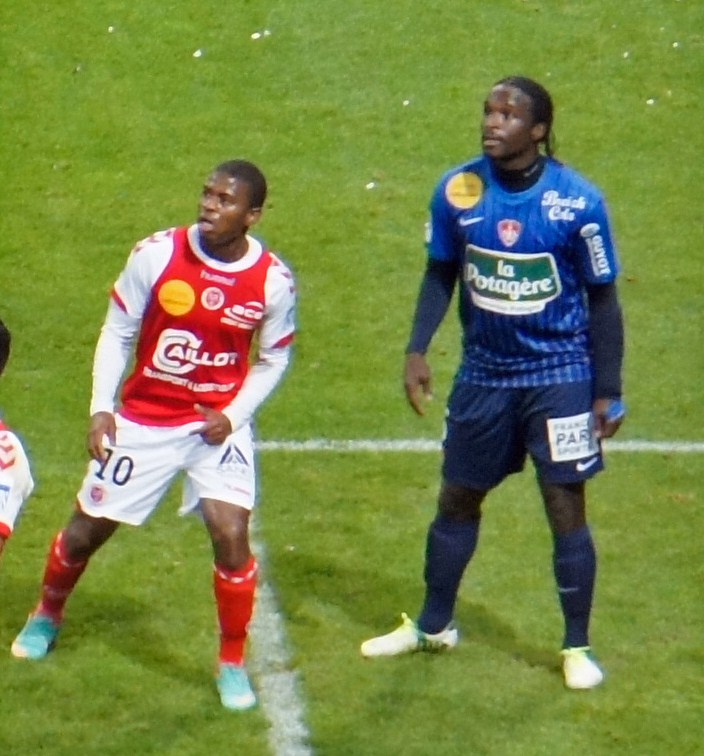
Bernard Mendy, 2012.

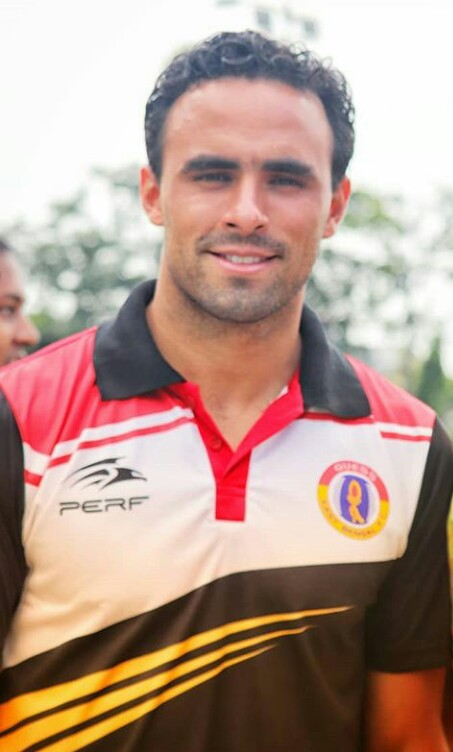
Enrique Esqueda at East Bengal, 2019.

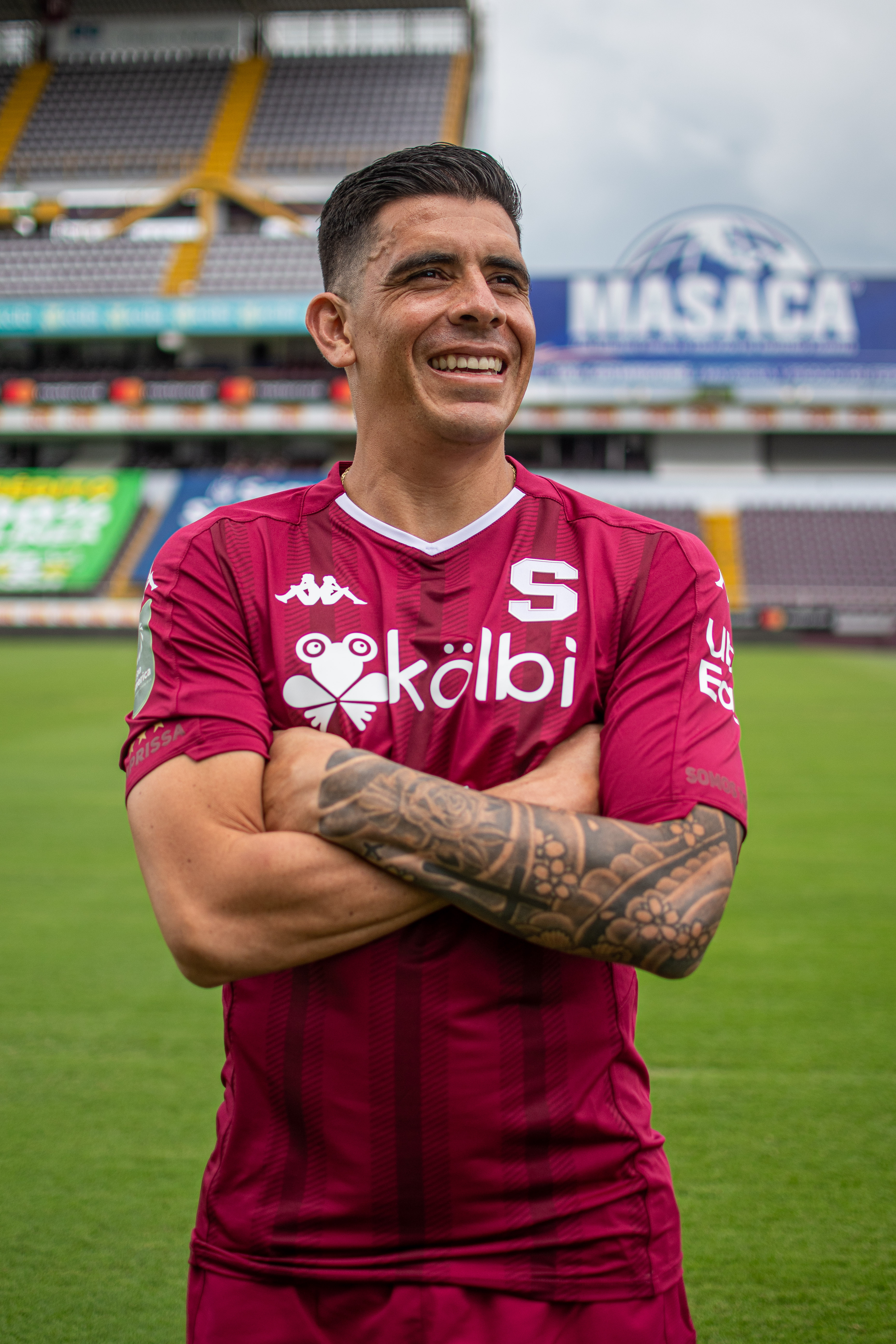
Johnny Acosta in 2020.

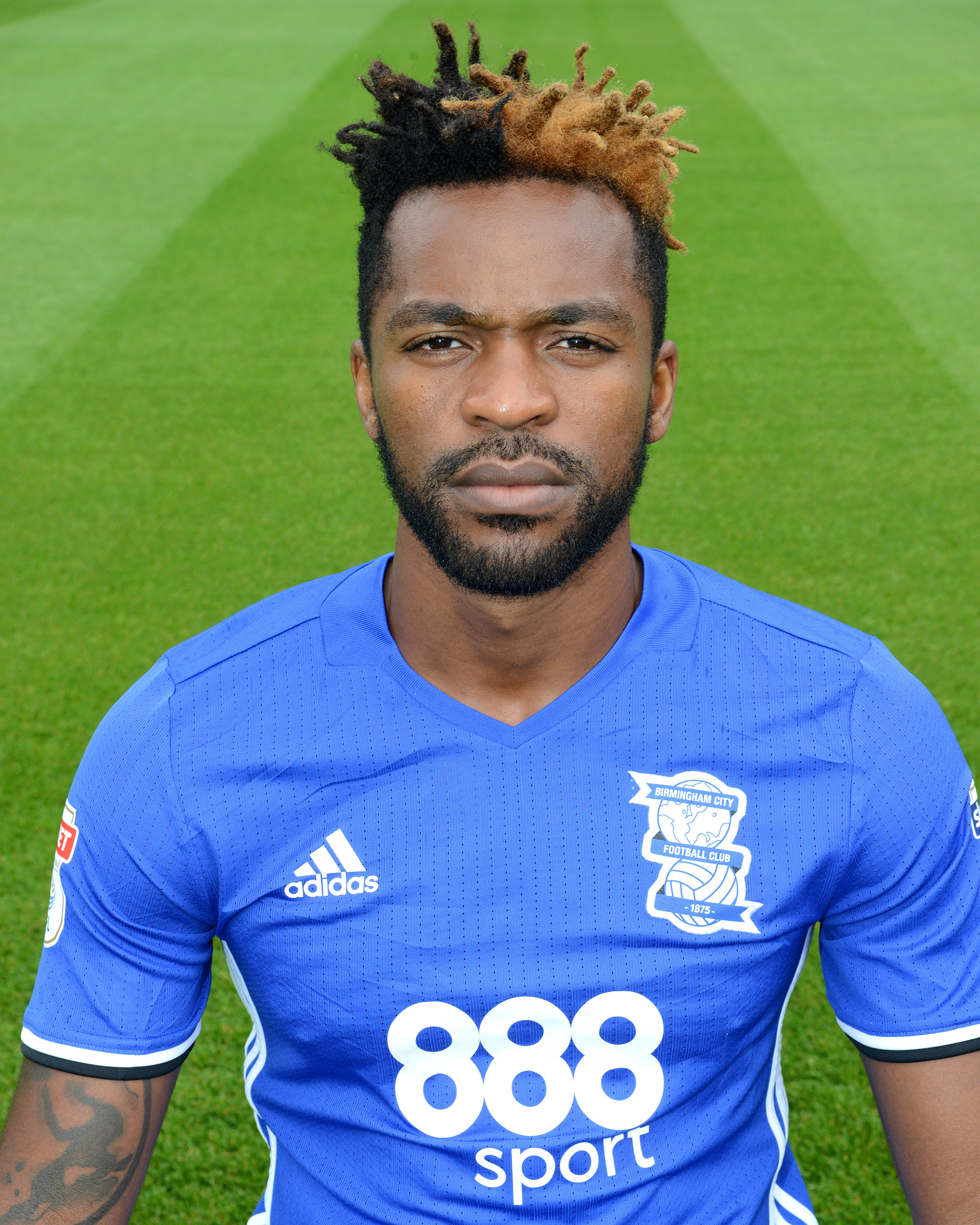
Jacques Maghoma.

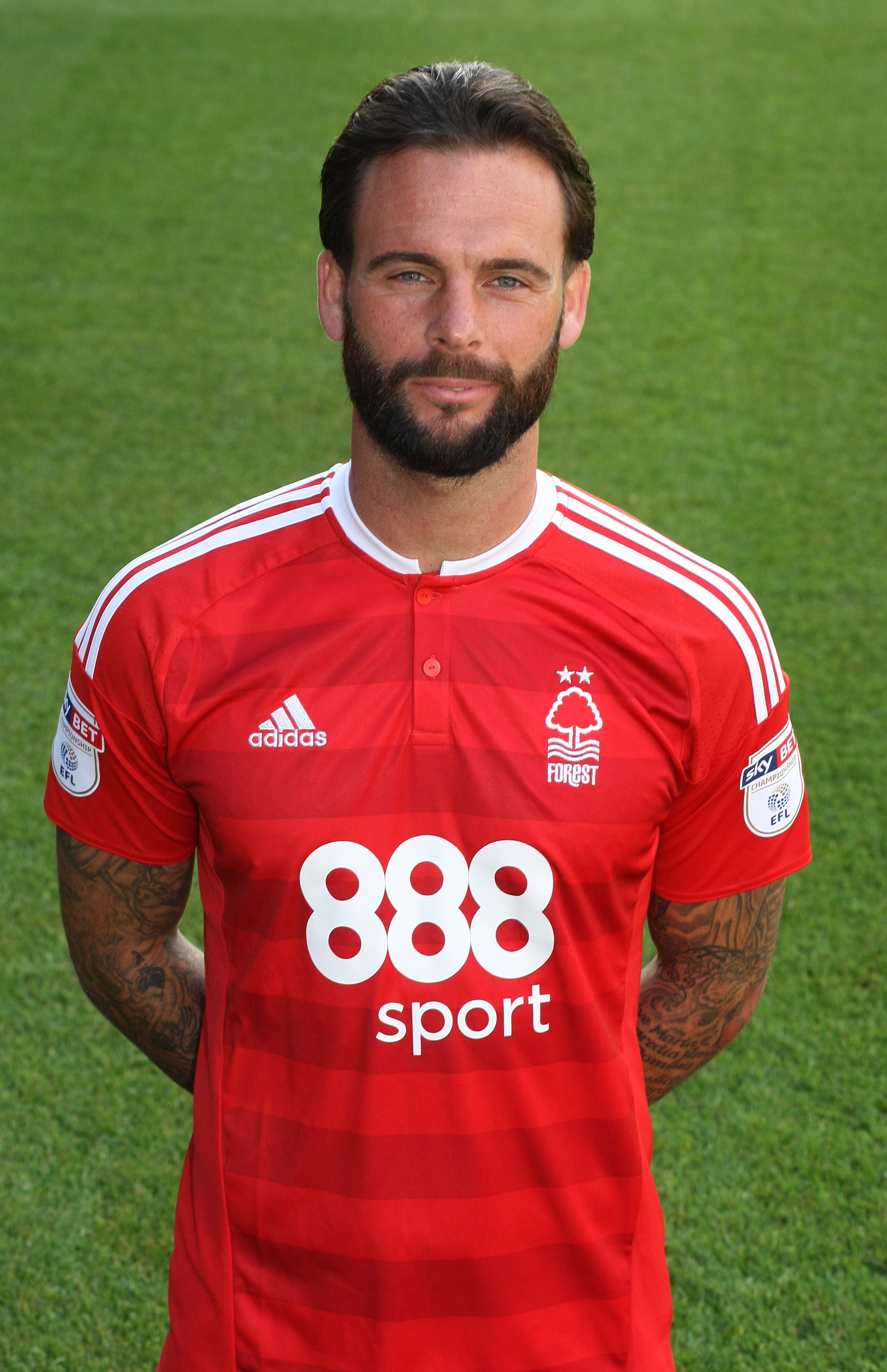
Danny Fox.

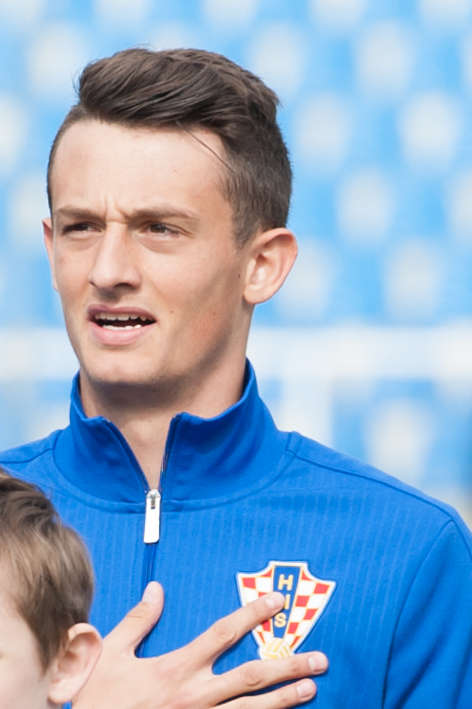
Franjo Prce.

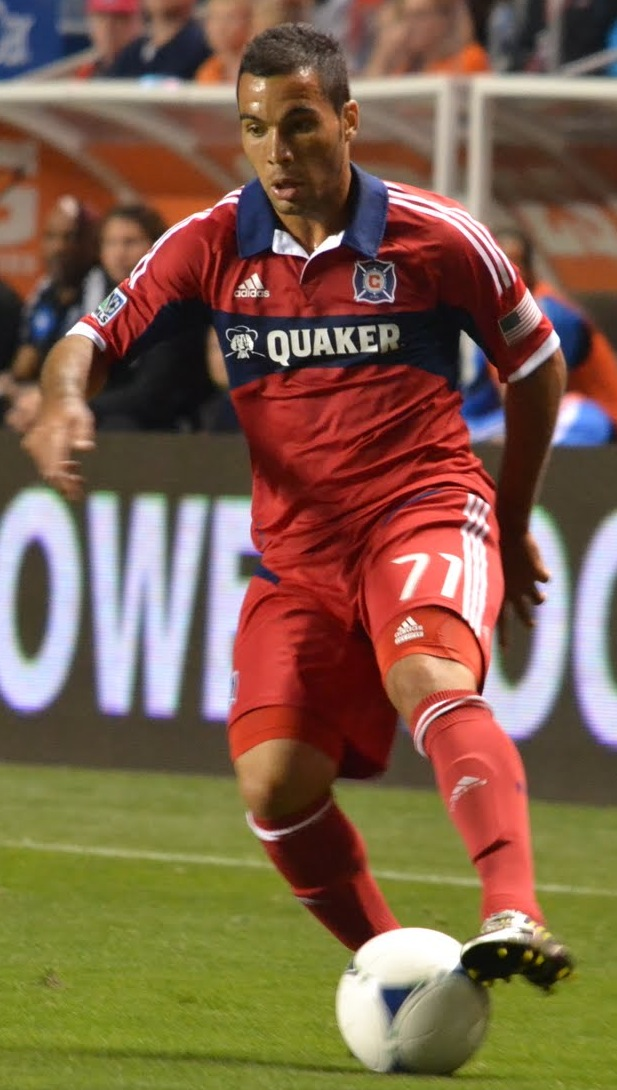
Alex Lima in 2012.

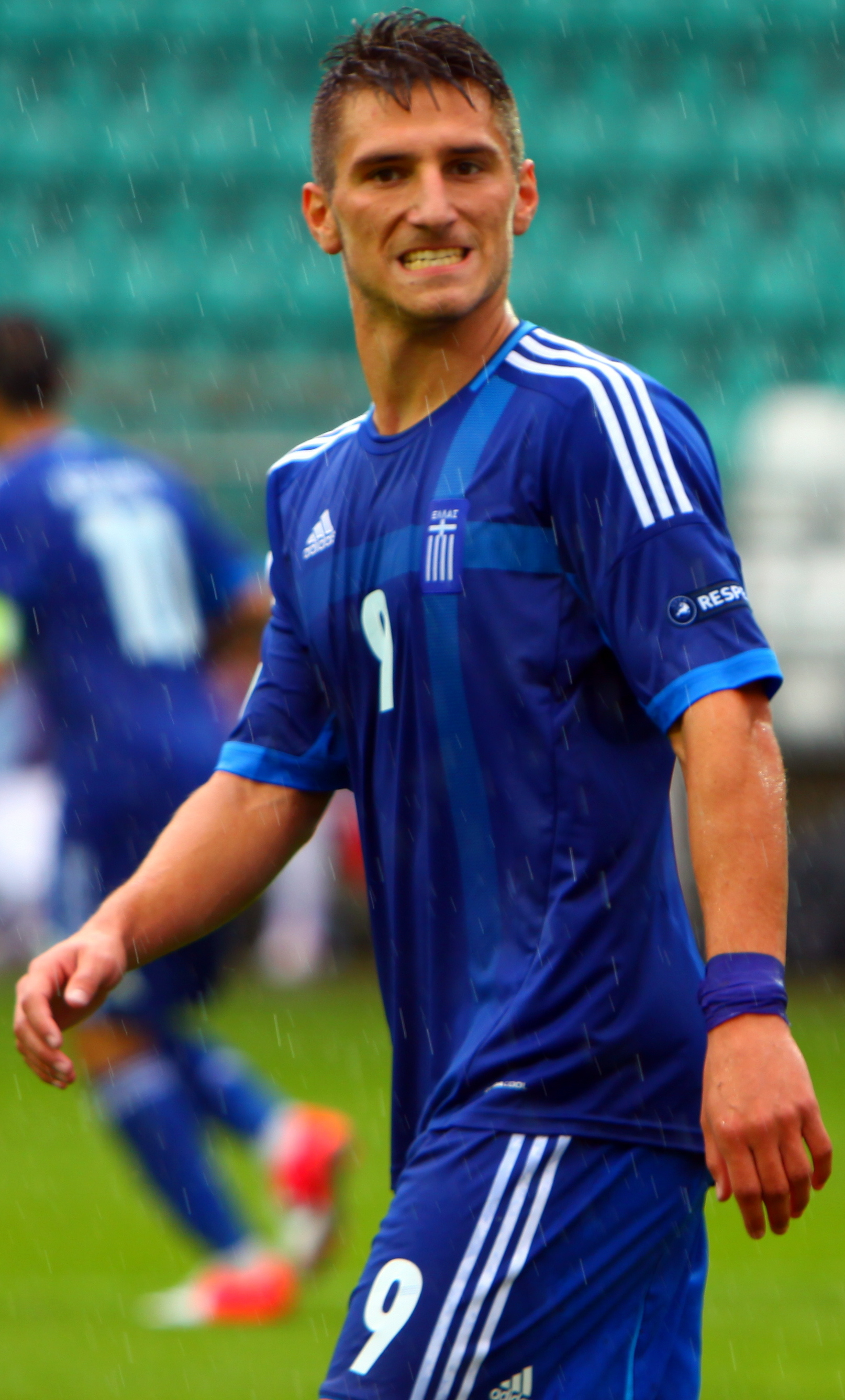
Diamantakos with Greece U19 in 2012.

As of 17 September 2026

Each player is mentioned only once, some of them have rejoined the club later again in different seasons but those entries are excluded from the list.

No.	Season Joined	Nationality	Name	Position	Ref.
1	1942–43	(British rule in Burma) Burma	**Fred Pugsley**	FW	
2	1952–53	Pakistan	**Masood Fakhri**	FW	
3	1952–53	Pakistan	**Riasat Ali**	DF	
4	1953–54	Pakistan	**Niaz Ali**	MF	
5	1953–54	Pakistan	F. R. Khan	FW	
6	1954–55	Pakistan	Mohammad Ghazi	FW	
7	1954–55	Pakistan	Muhammad Qasim	MF	
8	1954–55	Pakistan	**Tarapada Roy** (Note: Tarapada Roy was born in the Bengal Presidency, British India. He made his international debut for Pakistan national football team during the Asian Quadrangular Football Tournament in 1953, before acquiring the Citizenship of India. Between 1955 and 1956, he became an Indian citizen.) †	FW	
9	1954–55	Pakistan	**Jamil Akhtar**	FW	
10	1955–56	Pakistan	**Sumbal Khan**	MF	
11	1955–56	Pakistan	**Abdul Haq**	DF	
12	1956–57	Pakistan	**Moosa Ghazi**	FW	
13	1956–57	Pakistan	**Hussain Killer**	MF	
14	1963–64	Sri Lanka	**Selim Mohammed Noor**	FW	
15	1965–66	Sri Lanka	**Peter Wilfred**	FW	
16	1965–66	Sri Lanka	**Muhammed Lafir**	FW	
17	1965–66	Pakistan	**Balai Dey** (Note: Balai Dey was born in the Bengal Presidency, British India. He made his senior international debut for Pakistan national team during their China tour in 1964, before acquiring the Citizenship of India in 1966. He later broke into the India national team in 1969 and earned the title "Indian Rock" for outstanding performance in the Merdeka Tournament in Malaysia in the same year.) †	GK	
18	1975–76	Hong Kong	Ruk Bahadur	FW	
19	1979–80	Nigeria	David Williams	FW	
20	1980–81	Iran	Mahmood Khabaji	MF	
21	1980–81	Iran	**Majid Bishkar**	FW	
22	1980–81	Iran	Jamshid Nassiri	FW	
23	1984–85	Nepal	**Ganesh Thapa**	MF	
24	1986–87	Iran	Gholam Ali	FW	
25	1986–87	Brazil	Manilton Santos	MF	
26	1986–87	Nigeria	Charles Apu	MF	
27	1986–87	Nigeria	**Emeka Ezeugo**	MF	
28	1986–87	Nigeria	Chibuzor Nwakanma	FW	
29	1986–87	Bangladesh	**Khandoker Wasim Iqbal**	FW	
30	1987–88	Republic of Ireland	**John Devine**	DF	
31	1987–88	Iran	Samad Naorojian	MF	
32	1987–88	Nigeria	Chima Okorie	FW	
33	1987–88	Nigeria	Johnny Akujebi	DF	
34	1988–89	Argentina	**Julian Camino**	DF	
35	1991–92	Bangladesh	**Monem Munna**	DF	
36	1991–92	Bangladesh	**Sheikh Mohammad Aslam**	FW	
37	1991–92	Bangladesh	**Rizvi Karim Rumi**	MF	
38	1991–92	Bangladesh	**Golam Mohammad Gaus**	MF	
39	1991–92	Nigeria	Lulu Nwike	MF	
40	1991–92	England	Steven Alan Prindiville	DF	
41	1991–92	England	Neil Edmonds	MF	
42	1991–92	Scotland	Peter Maguire	FW	
43	1992–93	Nigeria	Christopher Kem	DF	
44	1994–95	Bangladesh	**Rakib Hossain**	MF	
45	1994–95	Bangladesh	**Mizanur Rahman**	MF	
46	1994–95	Sudan	Jallaluddin	FW	
47	1996–97	Latvia	F. Valērijs Tomaskov	DF	
48	1996–97	Latvia	Sergejs Kutov	MF	
49	1996–97	Sweden	Ulf Johansson	MF	
50	1996–97	Nepal	**Dev Narayan Chaudhary**	MF	
51	1996–97	Nigeria	Kelechi Okorie	DF	
52	1996–97	Kenya	**Sammy Omollo**	DF	
53	1997–98	Kenya	**Haggi Azande Abulista**	GK	
54	1997–98	Kenya	Toni Jose Oniyenga	FW	
55	1997–98	Brazil	Hugo Fernando Garcia "Preto"	FW	
56	1997–98	Brazil	Marcelo Gonçalves Domingos Araújo	DF	
57	1997–98	Brazil	Oliviera	FW	
58	1997–98	Nigeria	Beili	MF	
59	1997–98	Nigeria	Humphrey Zebba	MF	
60	1997–98	Nigeria	Felix Abayomi	FW	
61	1998–99	Ghana	Suley Musah	DF	
62	1998–99	Ghana	Jackson Egypong	DF	
63	1998–99	Ghana	**Emmanuel Opoku**	MF	
64	1999–00	Ghana	Abu Iddrisu	MF	
65	1999–00	Ghana	Willie Brown	MF	
66	1999–00	Ghana	Kennedy Ofosuhene Amponsah	FW	
67	1999–00	Brazil	Oseías Luíz Ferreira	FW	
68	2000–01	Nigeria	Awoyemi Isiaka	DF	
69	2000–01	Ukraine	Andriy Malchevskyi	FW	
70	2000–01	Ghana	Siva Mumuni	DF	
71	2000–01	Uzbekistan	Ilhom Sharipov	FW	
72	2000–01	Uzbekistan	Olim Talliaev	MF	
73	2000–01	Nigeria	Omolaja Olalekan	FW	
74	2001–02	Tanzania	**Ally Mayay Tembele**	FW	
75	2001–02	Brazil	Jose Carlos	FW	
76	2002–03	Brazil	Douglas De Silva	DF/MF	
77	2002–03	Nigeria	Mike Okoro	FW	
78	2002–03	Brazil	Gilmar da Silva	MF	
79	2003–04	Brazil	Cristiano Júnior	FW	
80	2004–05	Rwanda (Note: Aniweta player was born in Nigeria but played International football for Rwanda)	**Louis Aniweta**	DF	
81	2004–05	Brazil	Paolo Da Silva	FW	
82	2004–05	Nigeria	Ernest Jeremiah	FW	
83	2004–05	Brazil	Juliano Martins	FW	
84	2004–05	Ghana	**Felix Aboagye**	FW	
85	2004–05	Brazil	Marcos Secco	MF	
86	2005–06	(Democratic Republic of the Congo) DR Congo	**Liswa Nduti**	DF	
87	2005–06	South Africa	Sydney Nkalanga	FW	
88	2005–06	Cameroon	Ngassa Guy Martial	DF	
89	2005–06	Cameroon	Ndem Guy Herve	MF	
90	2006–07	Brazil	Luiz Octavio Alvez de Souza	DF	
91	2006–07	Brazil	Marcio Fernandes Tomaz	FW	
92	2006–07	Brazil	Daniel Carlos Jorge	MF	
93	2006–07	Brazil	Thiago de Sousa Ferreira da Costa	FW	
94	2006–07	Japan	Arata Izumi (Note: Arata Izumi joined East Bengal when he carried a Japanese passport. He acquired Indian citizenship in 2012, and represented the India national football team in the 2013 SAFF Championship.) †	MF	
95	2006–07	Brazil	Cristiano Hilario de Oliveira	DF	
96	2006–07	Kenya	**Boniface Ambani**	FW	
97	2006–07	Brazil	Edmilson	FW	
98	2007–08	Ghana	Abdul Samad Okocha	DF	
99	2007–08	Nigeria	Bolaji Majek	DF	
100	2007–08	Nigeria	Abeeku Gaiesi	FW	
101	2007–08	South Africa	**MacDonald Mukansi**	MF	
102	2007–08	Kenya	**Julius Owino**	DF	
103	2007–08	Nigeria	Ibe Ikechukwu Gift	MF	
104	2008–09	Ghana	Yusif Yakubu	FW	
105	2008–09	Ghana	**Ishmael Addo**	MF	
106	2009–10	Czech Republic	Jan Berger	MF	
107	2009–10	Argentina	Sebastian Monesterolo	FW	
108	2009–10	Australia	Srećko Mitrović	MF	
109	2009–10	Ghana	Abel Hammond	FW	
110	2009–10	Nigeria	Uga Okpara	DF	
111	2010–11	Nigeria	Penn Orji	MF	
112	2010–11	Nigeria	Ekene Ikenwa	FW	
113	2010–11	Australia	Tolgay Özbey	FW	
114	2010–11	Brazil	Leko	FW	
115	2011–12	Scotland	Alan Gow	FW	
116	2012–13	Nigeria	Chidi Edeh	FW	
117	2012–13	Australia	Andrew Barisic	FW	
118	2013–14	South Sudan	**James Moga**	FW	
119	2013–14	Japan	Ryuji Sueoka	FW	
120	2014–15	Australia	Milan Susak	DF	
121	2014–15	New Zealand	**Leo Bertos**	MF	
122	2014–15	Nigeria	Ranti Martins	FW	
123	2014–15	Nigeria	Dudu Omagbemi	FW	
124	2015–16	Nigeria	Bello Razaq	DF	
125	2015–16	South Korea	Do Dong Hyun	FW	
126	2015–16	Nigeria	Orok Essien	FW	
127	2015–16	France	**Bernard Mendy**	DF	
128	2016–17	Nigeria	Somide Adelaja	FW	
129	2016–17	England	Calum Angus	DF	
130	2016–17	Haiti	**Wedson Anselme**	FW	
131	2016–17	Trinidad and Tobago	**Willis Plaza**	FW	
132	2016–17	Uganda	**Ivan Bukenya**	DF	
133	2016–17	Kyrgyzstan	**Ildar Amirov**	FW	
134	2016–17	Australia	Chris Payne	FW	
135	2017–18	Syria	**Mahmoud Amnah**	MF	
136	2017–18	Trinidad and Tobago	**Carlyle Mitchell**	DF	
137	2017–18	Brazil	Charles	FW	
138	2017–18	Ivory Coast	Bazie Armand	MF	
139	2017–18	Japan	Katsumi Yusa	MF	
140	2017–18	Equatorial Guinea	**Eduardo Ferreira**	DF	
141	2017–18	Liberia	Ansumana Kromah	FW	
142	2017–18	Uganda	**Khalid Aucho**	MF	
143	2018–19	France	Kassim Aidara	MF	
144	2018–19	Costa Rica	**Jhonny Acosta**	DF	
145	2018–19	Spain	Borja Gomez Perez	DF	
146	2018–19	Mexico	**Enrique Esqueda**	FW	
147	2018–19	Spain	Jaime Santos Colado	MF	
148	2018–19	Spain	Antonio Rodríguez Dovale	MF	
149	2019–20	Spain	Martí Crespí	DF	
150	2019–20	Spain	Marcos de la Espada	FW	
151	2019–20	Spain	Juan Mera González	MF	
152	2019–20	Spain	Víctor Pérez Alonso	MF	
153	2020–21	Iran	Omid Singh ‡	MF	(Note: Omid Singh was signed by East Bengal in April for the 2020–21 season, however, after their entry into the Indian Super League he was not registered into the squad and was later released by the club.)
154	2020–21	Australia	Scott Neville	DF	
155	2020–21	Wales	Aaron Amadi-Holloway	FW	
156	2020–21	Republic of Ireland	**Anthony Pilkington**	MF	
157	2020–21	Scotland	**Danny Fox**	DF	
158	2020–21	Germany	Matti Steinmann	MF	
159	2020–21	(Democratic Republic of the Congo) DR Congo	**Jacques Maghoma**	MF	
160	2020–21	Nigeria	Bright Enobakhare	FW	
161	2020–21	England	Calum Woods ‡	DF	(Note: Calum Woods was signed as the 8th foreigner of the season, joining the team in Goa but was not registered into the Indian Super League squad and kept as a backup.)
162	2021–22	Slovenia	**Amir Dervišević**	MF	
163	2021–22	Australia	Tomislav Mrcela	DF	
164	2021–22	Croatia	Franjo Prce	DF	
165	2021–22	Nigeria	Daniel Chima Chukwu	FW	
166	2021–22	Netherlands	Darren Sidoel	MF	
167	2021–22	Croatia	**Antonio Perošević**	FW	
168	2021–22	Brazil	Marcelo Ribeiro	FW	
169	2021–22	Spain	Francisco José Sota	MF	
170	2021–22	Nepal	**Ananta Tamang**	DF	
171	2022–23	Spain	Iván González	DF	
172	2022–23	Cyprus	**Charalambos Kyriakou**	DF	
173	2022–23	Brazil	Alex Lima	MF	
174	2022–23	Brazil	Cleiton Silva	FW	
175	2022–23	Brazil	Eliandro	FW	
176	2022–23	Australia	Jordan O'Doherty	MF	
177	2022–23	England	Jake Jervis	FW	
178	2023–24	Spain	Borja Herrera	MF	
179	2023–24	Spain	Javier Siverio	FW	
180	2023–24	Spain	Saúl Crespo	MF	
181	2023–24	Spain	José Antonio Pardo	DF	
182	2023–24	Australia	Jordan Elsey	DF	
183	2023–24	Jordan	**Hijazi Maher**	DF	
184	2023–24	Spain	Víctor Vázquez	MF	
185	2023–24	Costa Rica	**Felicio Brown Forbes**	FW	
186	2023–24	Serbia	Aleksandar Pantić	DF	
187	2024–25	Greece	**Dimitrios Diamantakos**	FW	
188	2024–25	France	Madih Talal	MF	
189	2024–25	Spain	Héctor Yuste	DF	
190	2024–25	Venezuela	**Richard Celis**	FW	
191	2024–25	Cameroon	**Messi Bouli**	FW	
192	2025–26	Brazil	Miguel Figueira Damasceno	MF	
193	2025–26	Palestine	**Mohammed Rashid**	MF	
194	2025–26	Argentina	Kevin Sibille	DF	
195	2025–26	Morocco	**Hamid Ahadad**	FW	
196	2025–26	Japan	Hiroshi Ibusuki	FW	
197	2025–26	Spain	Youssef Ezzejjari	FW	
198	2025–26	Denmark	Anton Søjberg	FW	
199	2026–27	Spain	Dani Ramírez	MF	
200	2026–27	Spain	Nacho Monsalve	DF	
201	2026–27	Nigeria	Effiong Nsungusi	FW	
202	2026–27	Australia	**Chris Ikonomidis**	FW	
203	2026–27	Croatia	Diego Živulić	DF	
204	2026–27	Ivory Coast	Aké Arnaud Loba	FW	
205	2026–27	Poland	Łukasz Zwoliński	FW	

== Players by nationality ==
As of 17 September 2026

Region	Nationality	No. of players
Africa	Cameroon	3
Africa	(Democratic Republic of the Congo) DR Congo	2
Africa	Equatorial Guinea	1
Africa	Ghana	12
Africa	Ivory Coast	2
Africa	Kenya	5
Africa	Liberia	1
Africa	Morocco	1
Africa	Nigeria	31
Africa	Rwanda	1
Africa	South Africa	2
Africa	South Sudan	1
Africa	Sudan	1
Africa	Tanzania	1
Africa	Uganda	2
Africa	Total	66
Asia	Australia (Note: Football Australia, a former member of the OFC, joined the AFC in 2006.)	10
Asia	Bangladesh	7
Asia	Hong Kong	1
Asia	Iran	6
Asia	Japan	4
Asia	Jordan	1
Asia	Kyrgyzstan	1
Asia	Myanmar	1
Asia	Nepal	3
Asia	Pakistan	12
Asia	Palestine	1
Asia	South Korea	1
Asia	Sri Lanka	3
Asia	Syria	1
Asia	Uzbekistan	2
Asia	Total	55
Europe	Croatia	3
Europe	Cyprus	1
Europe	Czech Republic	1
Europe	Denmark	1
Europe	England	5
Europe	France	3
Europe	Germany	1
Europe	Greece	1
Europe	Latvia	2
Europe	Netherlands	1
Europe	Poland	1
Europe	Republic of Ireland	2
Europe	Scotland	3
Europe	Serbia	1
Europe	Slovenia	1
Europe	Spain	18
Europe	Sweden	1
Europe	Ukraine	1
Europe	Wales	1
Europe	Total	48
North America	Costa Rica	2
North America	Mexico	1
North America	Trinidad and Tobago	2
North America	Haiti	1
North America	Total	6
Oceania	New Zealand	1
Oceania	Total	1
South America	Argentina	3
South America	Brazil	25
South America	Venezuela	1
South America	Total	29
Overall Total		205
