= Emil Vartazarian =

Armenian-Iranian rugby football and association football player (born 1976)

- Born: Emil Vartazarian; 25 May 1976 (age 50) Tehran, Iran
- Height: 5 ft 6 in (1.68 m)
- Weight: 72 kg (159 lb)
- School: Armenian College
- University: University of Calcutta

Rugby union career
- Position(s): Full Back; Fly Half
Senior career
Years	Team	Apps	(Points)
1991–1995	Armenian College		
1993–2001	Armenian SC		
International career
Years	Team	Apps	(Points)
1998–2008	India		
Coaching career
- Years: Team
- 2007: Iran

Emil Vartazarian is an Armenian-Iranian retired rugby and association football player who played for the India national rugby union team from 1998 to 2006. He has also played professional football for Bengal Mumbai FC in the Mumbai Super Division League alongside Mohammedan Sporting in the Calcutta Football League.

== Club career ==
Vartazarian came here from Tehran in 1987 when he was 10, as many Armenians do. They come to study at the Armenian College (Kolkata) and Philanthropic Academy of Calcutta.

Besides Rugby, Vartazarian was also good enough in association football and played for Jamshid Nassiri managed Bengal Mumbai FC in the MDFA Elite League from 2003 to 2004. He previously played for Kolkata-based Mohammedan Sporting in 2001–02 season, after graduating in film studies from St. Xavier's College.

== Coaching career ==
- Technical Director: Tamil Nadu rugby team (2008)
- Head Coach : Iran national rugby union team (2007)

== Achievements ==
Vartazarian played rugby for his college team from 1991 until 1995. Vartazarian had to stop as the college team did not have a team for school students one year under the age of 19. As a result of this he started to play for the Armenian Soccer Club from 1993 to 2001.

The last time, during representing his prestigious Armenian team, Vartazarian was a part of the squad that won the All India Beach 7 a-side rugby in Chennai, in 2001. He was a regular member in the Indian national rugby team which was established in 1998.

== Managerial career ==
By profession, Vartazarian was the Technical Director for the South Indian Rugby Football Association (SIRFA). In addition to this, he was also a key player in the Chennai state team (Chennai Cheetahs) and coach of both the Chennai team and the Tamil Nadu Police state team. He was also the assistant coach for the Indian under-19 Rugby team. With him as a player and coach, the Chennai Cheetahs won the All-Indian Beach Seven a side tournament in Chennai in 2003, went up to the semi-finals in the all India tournament in 2002 as well as 2003, won the National Cup in 2004, lost the finals in 2005 and once again brought home the cup in 2006. They have also won the South India 'Ten a side' tournament in 2007 and 'All India Sevens' in 2005.

Vartazarian also managed the first Iranian national team, leading them to victory against Pakistan in a series of two test matches in 2007.

== Personal life ==
Vartazarian has a degree in Film Studies from St. Xaviers College, Kolkata. Charismatic, good looking and superbly fit, he has appeared in commercials for Seven Up, Park Avenue and some energy drinks. His hobbies include rigorous gym work outs and cooking for his family and friends. He has interests in cinema and starting an ethnic Iranian-Indian cuisine restaurant. Vartazarian has also completed a Master's course in Sports Management in Australia, and currently resides in Melbourne, Victoria.

== See also ==
- List of foreign football players in India
