= Bengal Mumbai FC =

Defunct association football club in India

Bengal Mumbai
- Full name: Bengal Mumbai Football Club
- Short name: BMFC
- Founded: 1 January 1998; 28 years ago
- Dissolved: 2011; 15 years ago
- Ground: B.P.T. Ground
- Capacity: 5,000
- Chairman: Krishnendu Sen
- Head coach: Wali Mohammed
- League: NFL 2nd Division; Mumbai Elite League

Bengal Mumbai Football Club, known by its abbreviation BMFC, was an Indian professional football club based in Mumbai, Maharashtra. Founded in 1998, they have competed in the National Football League II, alongside the MDFA Elite League.

Bengal Mumbai is the second professionally founded football club in India and the first in Mumbai. The team was dissolved in 2011.

== History ==
=== Formation and journey ===
Bengal Mumbai Football Club was founded on January 1, 1998, with aims to compete in the top flight of Indian football the National Football League. Later, the club became affiliated with Mumbai District Football Association (MDFA) and began participating in the MDFA Elite League.

Bengal Mumbai represented the Mumbai-based Bengali community and ran the early professional youth academics to promote football in the Indian state of Maharashtra. After their foundation, the club emerged as the foremost professional top flight club from Mumbai to compete in the National Football League I & II.

The club enjoyed their major winning in 1998 (5 December) in the prestigious Rovers Cup defeating Central Railway by 3–0. In that tournament, they have also defeated giants like JCT Mills and Churchill Brothers. In the same year, they won the Western India Football Association (WIFA) organized Mumbai Super Division league with throughout dominance. They also participated in the later editions of Rovers Cup.

On 15 July 2001, Nigerian footballer Charles Ocheaga Esheku, playing his first match for Bengal Mumbai in the Harwood Football League at the Cooperage Ground, collapsed on the ground and was declared dead shortly after being admitted to the Bombay Hospital.

=== Final years ===
In 2010, Bengal Mumbai reached the final of the Sikkim Governor's Gold Cup defeating Three Star Club of Nepal and Shillong Lajong. In final, the club lost to ONGC FC by 1–3 margin and finished as runner-up.

Later in 2011, the club committee unanimously made the decision of disbanding the team due to financial and organizing failures.

== Crest and colours ==
Founded in 1998, the club's crest shows simplicity and it has a blue soccer ball, orbited by a prominent blue ring. Here abbreviation "BMFC", is written in black on top right and "Bengal Mumbai Football Club ltd." is written in blue in bottom right.

Club colours are blue and white.

=== Kit history ===
Home (1998–2011)	Away (1998–2011)

== Ownership ==
BMFC was owned by Bengal Mumbai Football Club Limited, which is a public company incorporated in 1998. It was classified as non-governmental company, as a company limited by shares and is registered at Registrar of Companies, RoC-Mumbai. Krishnendu Sen served as the chairman of BMFC until the club got dissolved in 2011.

== Overview ==
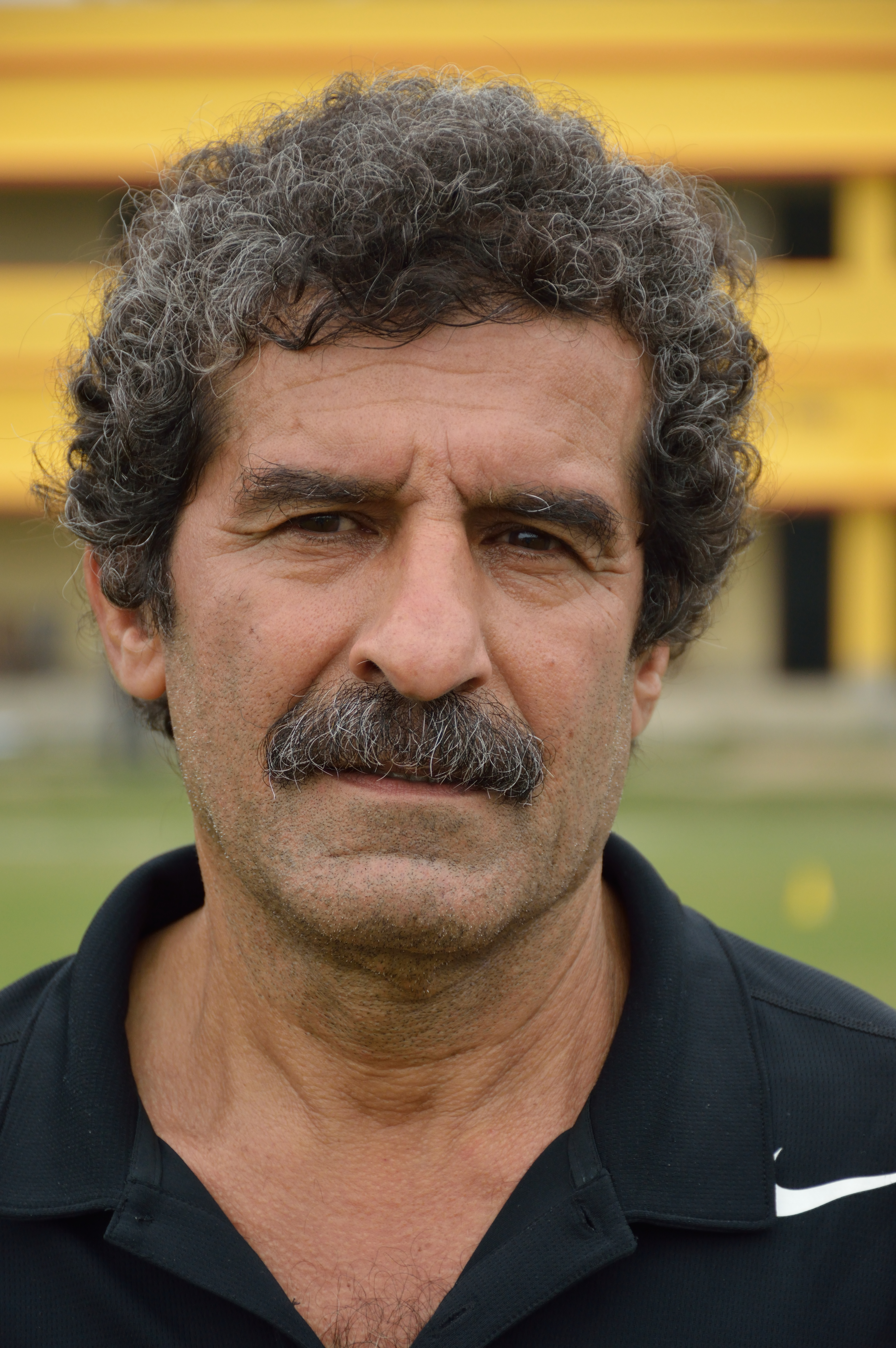
Former Iranian footballer Jamshid Nassiri was club's first manager (from 1998 to 2001).

The brainchild of Krishnendu Sen (media agency owner), Ajit Karmarkar (shipping magnate) and Shankar Maitra (businessman), among others, it had inducted Iranian Jamshid Nassiri as their coach. Nassiri managed the club from 1998 to 2001 during their golden years. Former India internationals James Lukram, Abhay Kumar and Abdul Khaliq, were signed for the club's inaugural season. Former Indian international players including Gift Raikhan, Uday Konar, Royston D'Souza, Kalyan Chaubey (who later became the president of All India Football Federation) have also appeared with the club.

Bengal Mumbai holds the distinguishing record of winning two major league tournaments during the same year of its inception, i.e. Mumbai Super Division (1998), and Rovers Cup (1998).

Indian Football Hall of Fame star Chima Okorie, who played for various clubs in England, Norway and Denmark, played for Bengal Mumbai during the 2001–02 season and also managed the team in 2006. He also became the club's CEO on 16 August.

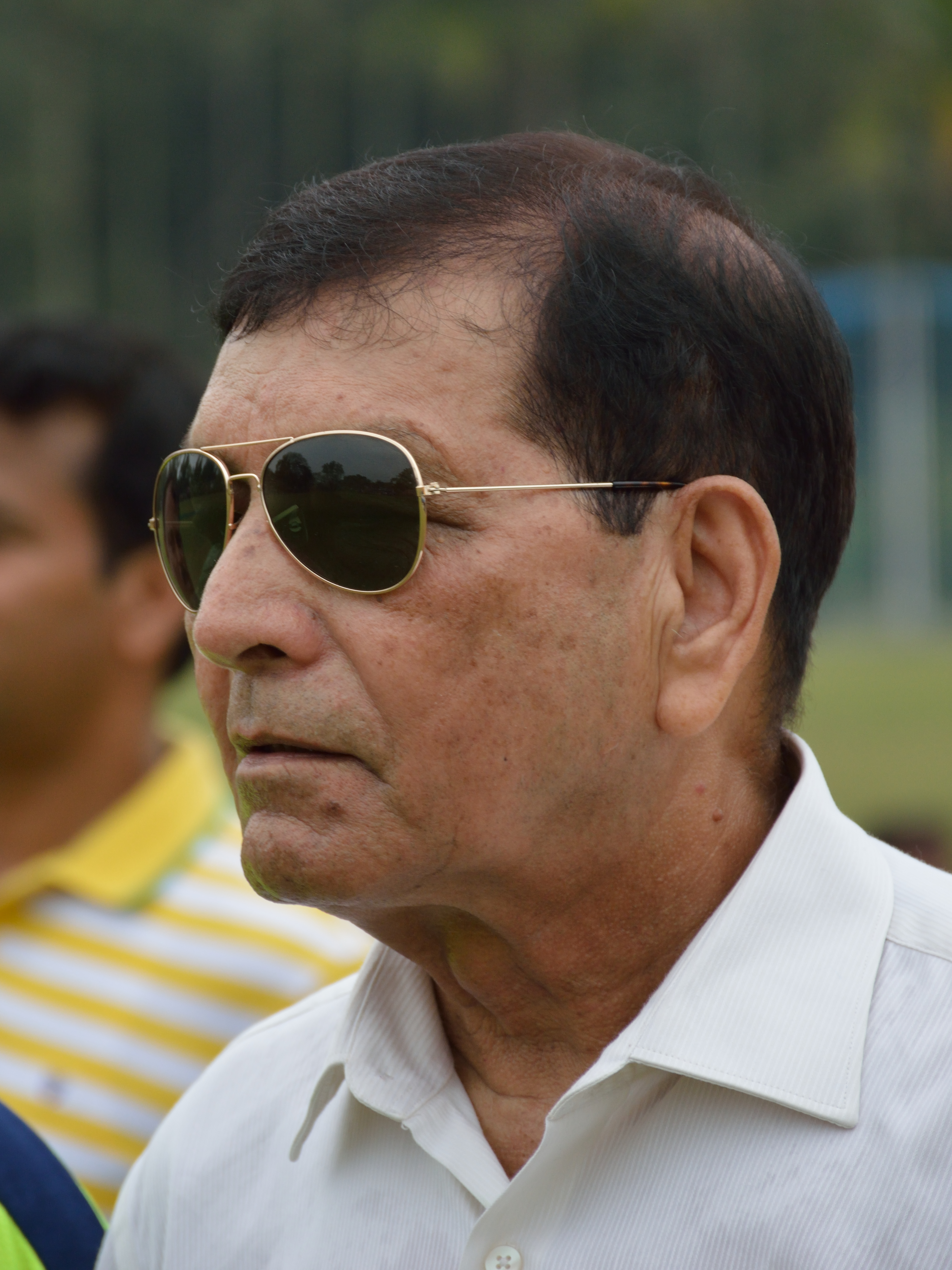
Dronacharya awardee coach Syed Nayeemuddin managed Bengal Mumbai in 2003–04 season.

Jahar Das was the manager of the club during their 2002–03 season. Notable Armenian-Iranian retired rugby union player Emil Vartazarian, who represented India, has also appeared with Bengal Mumbai between 2003 and 2004.

In 2003, Syed Nayeemuddin managed the club in Mumbai Super Division. In 2004, they finished as runners-up in Lal Bahadur Shastri Cup, losing 1–0 to Tata Football Academy. Later in 2004, Bengal Mumbai roped in former India international Syed Shahid Hakim as head coach, who managed the club for a season.

== Home ground ==
BPT Ground or Bombay Port Trust Trust Ground, is a football stadium in Sewri, Mumbai, Maharashtra, which is located at premises of the Bombay Port Trust, and was established in 1998. The stadium had a seating capacity of around 5,000 spectators and was home ground of Bengal Mumbai FC. The ground has also used by several Mumbai-based Cricket teams.

They have previously used Cooperage Ground for some of their games, which had a seating capacity of 12,000 spectators.

== Managerial history ==
- (Iran) Jamshid Nassiri (1998–2001) (Note: Nassiri holds the Indian Citizenship.)
- (India) Jahar Das (2001–2003)
- (India) Syed Nayeemuddin (2003–2004)
- (India) Syed Shahid Hakim (2004–2005)
- (India) Irenio Vaz (2005–2006)
- (Nigeria) Chima Okorie (2006–2007)
- (India) Mohammed Habib (2007–2008)
- (Brazil) Carlos Pereira (2008–2009)
- (India) Wali Mohammed (2009–2011)

== Notable players ==
For all notable Bengal Mumbai FC players with a Wikipedia article, see: Bengal Mumbai FC players.

== Team records ==
=== Notable win(s) against foreign teams ===
Competition	Round	Year	Opposition	Score	Venue	City	Ref
IFA Shield	Group stage	1998	(Thailand) Royal Thai Air Force	3–2	Salt Lake Stadium	Kolkata	
Sikkim Governor's Gold Cup	Quarter-final	2010	(Nepal) Three Star Club	1–1 (4–2 p)	Paljor Stadium	Gangtok	

== Honours ==
=== League ===
- Mumbai Football League
  - Champions (1): 1998 (Note: From 1990 to 1999, known as W.I.F.A. League Super Division.)
  - Runners-up (1): 2010

=== Cup ===
- Rovers Cup
  - Champions (1): 1998
- Lal Bahadur Shastri Cup
  - Runners-up (1): 2004
- Sikkim Governor's Gold Cup
  - Runners-up (1): 2010

== See also ==
- List of football clubs in Mumbai
- Sports in Maharashtra
