= B.P.T. Ground =

Association football stadium

Bombay Port Trust Ground
- B.P.T. Ground
- Location: Mumbai
- Coordinates: 18.9807953°N 72.8532252°E
- Establishment: 1998
- Capacity: 5,000
- Owner: Bombay Port Trust
- Operator: Bombay Port Trust
- Tenants: Bengal Mumbai FC

B.P.T. Ground or Bombay Port Trust Trust Ground is a football stadium in Mumbai. Founded in 1998, it is located at the premises of Bombay Port Trust. The stadium has a capacity of 5,000 spectators and was home of Bengal Mumbai FC.
