= Majid Bishkar =

Iranian footballer (born 1956)

Majid Beshkar
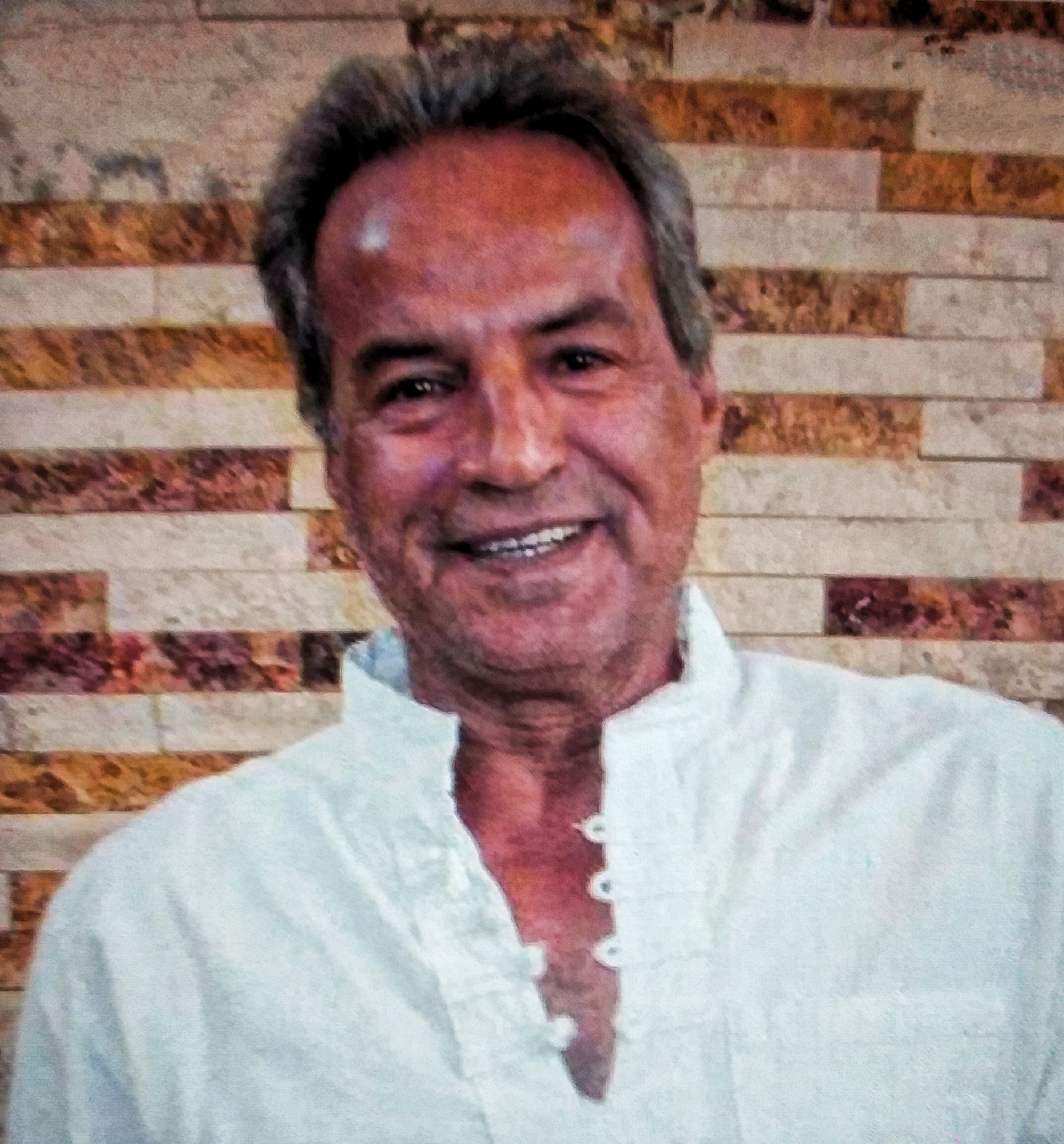
- Beshkar at home in Khorramshahr in 2021

Personal information
- Date of birth: 6 August 1956 (age 70)
- Place of birth: Khorramshahr, Imperial State of Iran
- Position: Attacking midfielder

Senior career*
Years	Team	Apps	(Gls)
1976–1978	Rastakhiz Khorramshahr	34	(18)
1978–1979	Shahbaz	22	(14)
1979–1981	East Bengal		(33)
1982–1987	Mohammedan	128	(62)

International career^{‡}
1976–1978	Iran	8	(2)
- * Club domestic league appearances and goals as of 09:55, 21 May 2019 (UTC) ‡ National team caps and goals as of 09:55, 20 September 2008 (UTC)

Majid Beshkar (Persian: مجید بیشکار; born 6 August 1956) is a retired Iranian professional footballer. He is best known for his contributions towards the Indian football clubs East Bengal and Mohammedan, both based in the city of Kolkata, West Bengal. He was popularly known as "Badshah" in Calcutta Maidan. An attacking midfielder, Bishkar also played as a forward in a 4–2–4 formation, and guided SC East Bengal to win the Indian Federation Cup in 1980. He represented the Iranian national football team at the 1978 FIFA World Cup in Argentina.

== Earlier career ==
At club level, Majid began his career in his hometown of Khorramshahr with Rastakhiz FC and then moved to the Tehran province League with Shahin Tehran FC as a forward, where he played until 1979.

== Career in India ==
During the 1970s he moved to Aligarh Muslim University in India to study. On seeing his performance for the university in the North Zone Inter University championship, Bishkar was signed by East Bengal FC along with other Iranian players Jamshid Nassiri and Mahmud Khabbasi. The 1980 Federation Cup was his debut tournament with the Red and Golds, where he won the tournament with them. In the same season, East Bengal also won the Rovers Cup where he played a key role.

East Bengal signed him shortly afterwards. He was known as Majid Baskar in India, a mispronunciation and misspelling which led to difficulties for both Iranian and Indian officials in unveiling the true identity of Majid.

Bishkar had a crucial part to play in the victories of East Bengal, helping the team win the joint IFA Shield along with the Darjeeling Gold Cup victory. In the IFA Shield, Bishkar created the goal of CB Thapa after a run of four consecutive wall passes. Bishkar also helped East Bengal secure a 3–2 victory over Mohun Bagan in the Darjeeling Gold Cup. During his time with the Red and Golds, Bishkar was able to score 33 goals.

He switched to Mohammedan Sporting Club in 1982, guiding them to a range of trophies including Calcutta Football League and Rovers Cup.

Majid was instrumental for the first win against Mohun Bagan AC in 1983 Federation Cup also helping to lift the trophy in the final. This win came after late sixties in any form of tournament. After a brief hiatus at a time when he was surrounded by controversies, he was last seen playing for Mohammedan SC in 1987. He was relatively unknown in Iran, with both Iranian football journalists and officials being unaware that Majid had previously plied his trade in India. Due to troubles in his homeland, he eventually got addicted to narcotics and led a bohemian lifestyle. After a few other unsuccessful stints in other parts of India, he moved back to Iran. He is still considered one of the best foreigners in the history of Indian club football. He has a nickname "Badshah" which he got while playing in Kolkata Maidan.

Bishkar cast a magical spell during two seasons at East Bengal and then at Mohammedan Sporting, but as he returned to Kolkata in 2019, after more than three decades, nobody had forgotten the Badshah.

"When I landed in Kolkata and picked up my luggage, I was wondering who would guide me to the hotel at 3am. I saw a few East Bengal officials inside the airport and was happy. Then some police escorts showed up and I was happier. But what I saw as I stepped out of the airport was unbelievable.

Hundreds of East Bengal supporters wearing the team jersey and waving flags were shouting my name. They were eager to get a glimpse of me and kept saying 'Badshah is here'. I rubbed my eyes in disbelief. I had left the city decades ago, yet they had not forgotten me"

— Majid Bishkar, on his last trip to Kolkata in 2019.

== International career ==
Bishkar was included in the Iran national football team for the 1978 FIFA World Cup. Iran made its debut World Cup appearance after defeating Australia in Tehran. Iran lost two of three group stage matches against the Netherlands and Peru, and Iran's journey ended early for the group stages.

== Personal life ==
After his brief stint with two Kolkata giants, Bishkar moved to Iran in the 1980s and currently live in Khorramshahr, Khuzestan province, with his family. On 1 October 2020, he was admitted to a hospital after a heart attack.

== Honours ==
East Bengal

- Federation Cup: 1980
- Rovers Cup: 1980

Mohammedan Sporting

- Federation Cup: 1983–84, 1984–85
- IFA Shield: runner-up: 1982
- Rovers Cup: 1984; runner-up: 1982, 1983
- Sait Nagjee Trophy: 1984
- Bordoloi Trophy: 1985; runner-up: 1983
- DCM Trophy: runner-up: 1982, 1983
- Darjeeling Gold Cup: 1984

Individual

- East Bengal "Best Foreign Player Award": 2019

== See also ==
- 1978 FIFA World Cup squads
- List of foreign players for SC East Bengal
