= Syed Shahid Hakim =

Indian footballer and coach (1939–2021)

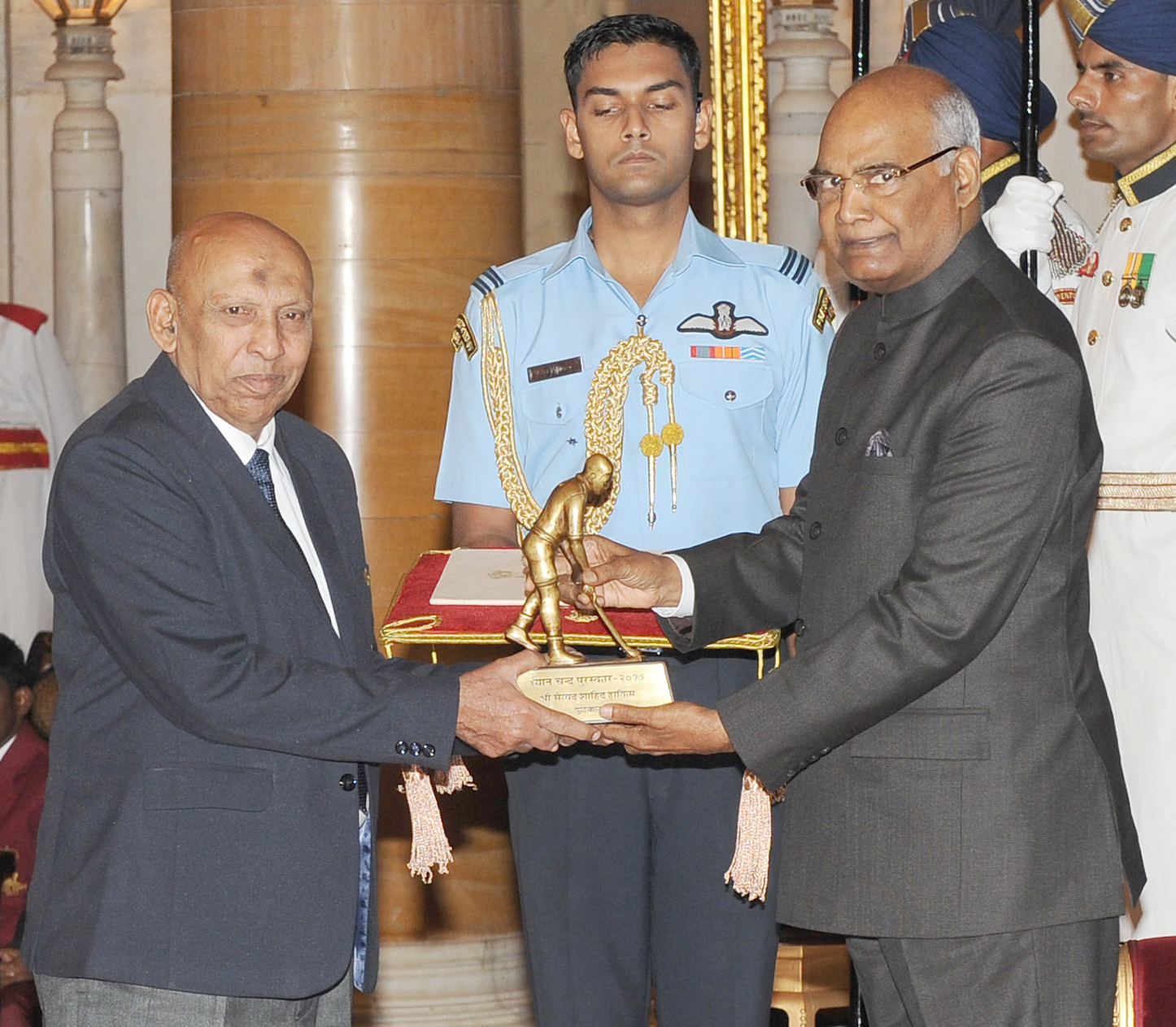
- The President, Ram Nath Kovind presenting the Dhyan Chand Award to Hakim at the Rashtrapati Bhavan, 29 August 2017.

Personal information
- Date of birth: 23 June 1939
- Place of birth: Hyderabad, Hyderabad State, British India (now in Telangana, India)
- Date of death: 22 August 2021 (aged 82)
- Place of death: Kalaburagi, Karnataka, India
- Position: Forward

Senior career*
Years	Team	Apps	(Gls)
- City College Old Boys
- Indian Air Force
- Hyderabad City Police

International career
1960	India		

Managerial career
- 1998–1999: Mahindra United
- 2000–2001: Salgaocar
- 2004–2005: Bengal Mumbai
- * Club domestic league appearances and goals

Syed Shahid Hakim (23 June 1939 – 22 August 2021) was an Indian footballer, football manager, FIFA official and referee. Hakim also acted as assistant manager of India national team during the 1980s. He was awarded by the prestigious Dhyan Chand Award in 2017 for his contributions to the sport.

== Playing career ==
Hakim was the member of the last India national football team played in the 1960 Rome Olympics. He served as the Regional Director of Sports Authority of India. He played in the position of half-back. Hakim was an international referee with FIFA badge holder.

In club football, Hakim appeared with Hyderabad City Police, then one of the strongest sides in Indian club football.

== Post-playing career ==
After retiring from football, Hakim became FIFA badge holder international referee, and officiated matches of Asian Club Championship, and the 1988 AFC Asian Cup in Qatar.

He also worked as pilot, having served as Squadron Leader of the Indian Air Force. Hakim later appointed regional director of Sports Authority of India (SAI). He also went on to serve as "project director in charge of scouting" before the beginning of 2017 FIFA U-17 World Cup in India.

== Managerial career ==
He managed National Football League (India) outfit Mahindra United from 1998 to 1999, and guided the team clinching 1998 Durand Cup. He later managed another NFL side Salgaocar, before becoming head coach of NFL second division and Bombay Harwood League club Bengal Mumbai in 2004–05.

Beside managing Indian clubs, he also served as assistant coach of P. K. Banerjee managed India national football team at the 1982 Asian Games in New Delhi.

Hakim-saab has been an inspiration to many Footballers over the years. He has been a versatile personality. He fully deserves the Award. Congratulations.

— Kushal Das, General Secretary of the All India Football Federation, on Hakim.

Hakim for his contributions to Indian football as coach and manager, was conferred with the prestigious Dronacharya Award in 2017.

== Personal life ==
Born in Hyderabad, British India, Hakim is son of legendary football coach Syed Abdul Rahim, whose tenure as coach of India national team is regarded as "golden age" of football in the country.

Hakim was tested positive for COVID-19 but recovered after treatment. He died on 22 August 2021 of cardiac arrest, aged 82, at a hospital in Gulbarga.

== Awards and honours ==
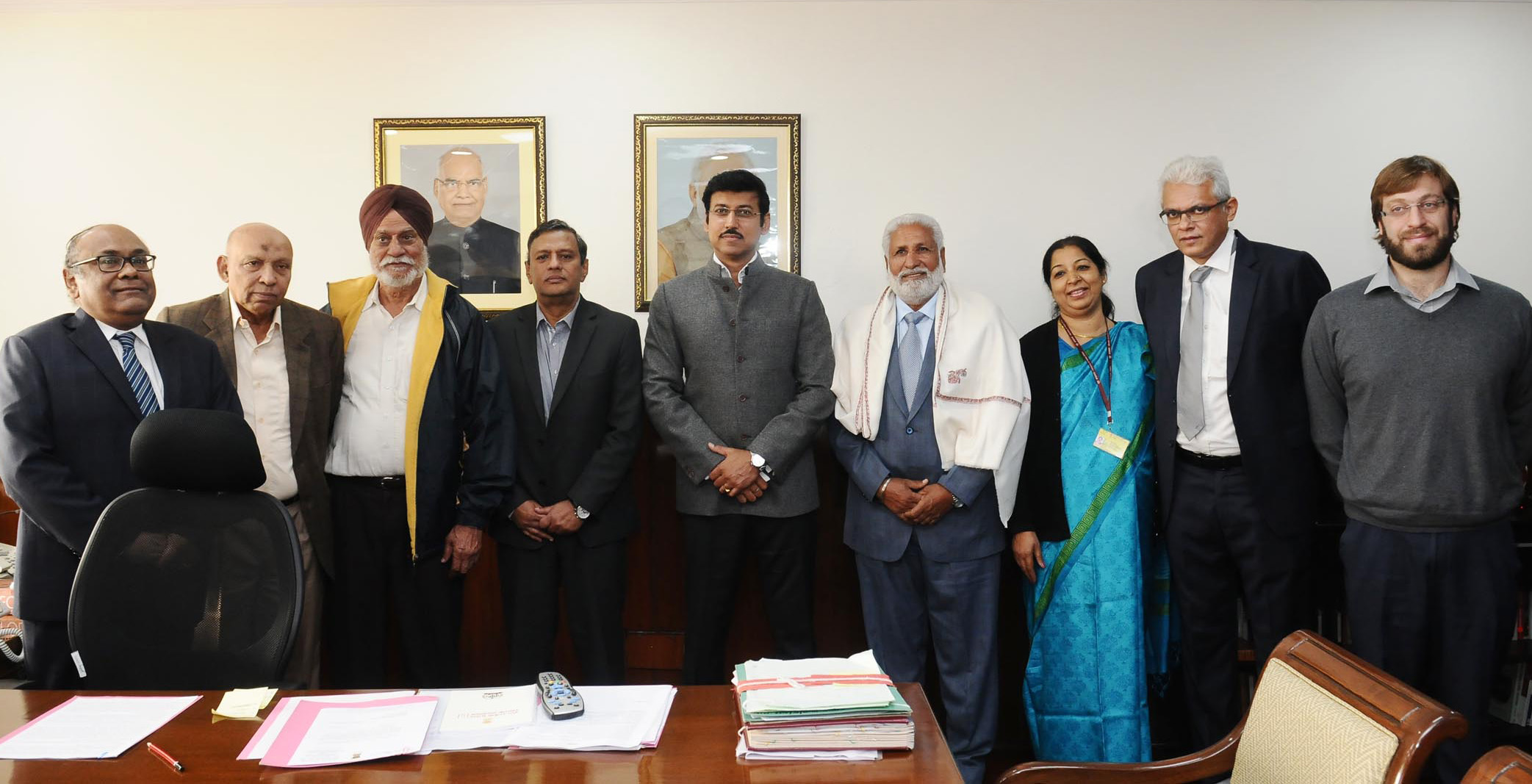
Shahid Hakim (second from left) at the felicitation ceremony hosted by the Ministry of State for Youth Affairs and Sports (IC) and Information & Broadcasting, in New Delhi, December 12, 2017.

=== Player ===
Hyderabad City Police

- Durand Cup: 1961
- Rovers Cup: 1960, 1962
- Sait Nagjee Trophy: 1958
- DCM Trophy: 1959

Hyderabad

- Santosh Trophy: 1957–58

Individual

- Dhyan Chand Award in 2017.

=== Manager ===
Mahindra United

- Durand Cup: 1998

Individual

- Dronacharya Award: 2017

== Bibliography ==
- Kapadia, Novy (2017). Barefoot to Boots: The Many Lives of Indian Football. Penguin Random House. ISBN 978-0-143-42641-7.
- Martinez, Dolores; Mukharjiim, Projit B (2009). Football: From England to the World: The Many Lives of Indian Football. Routledge. ISBN 978-1-138-88353-6. Archived from the original on 2 July 2022.
- Nath, Nirmal (2011). History of Indian Football: Upto 2009–10. Readers Service. ISBN 9788187891963. Archived from the original on 22 July 2022.
- Dineo, Paul; Mills, James (2001). Soccer in South Asia: Empire, Nation, Diaspora. London, United Kingdom: Frank Cass Publishers. ISBN 978-0-7146-8170-2. Archived from the original on 25 July 2022.
- "Triumphs and Disasters: The Story of Indian Football, 1889—2000" (PDF). Archived from the original (PDF) on 13 August 2012.
- Majumdar, Boria; Bandyopadhyay, Kausik (2006). A Social History Of Indian Football: Striving To Score. Routledge. ISBN 9780415348355. Archived from the original on 29 June 2021.
- Basu, Jaydeep (2003). Stories from Indian Football. UBS Publishers' Distributors. ISBN 9788174764546. Archived from the original on 11 October 2022.
- Shreekumar, S. S. (15 August 2020). THE BEST WAY FORWARD FOR INDIA'S FOOTBALL. HSRA Publications. ISBN 9788194721697. Archived from the original on 4 February 2023.
