= Andriy Malchevskyi =

Ukrainian footballer

Personal information
- Full name: Andriy Oleksandrovych Malchevskyi
- Date of birth: 1 December 1968 (age 57)
- Place of birth: Ukraine
- Position: Forward

Senior career*
Years	Team	Apps	(Gls)
1993	Stroitel (Brovary)	6	(0)
1994–1995	Kosonsoy	42	(17)
1996	Xorazm	6	(0)
	Sistema-Borex	2	(0)
	Elektron (Romny)	4	(1)
1997	Chilonzor	11	(1)
1998	Kosonsoy	22	(1)
- Mohammedan
1999	Zarafshan (Navoi)	4	(0)
–2000	Churchill Brothers		
2000–2001	East Bengal		
- Olimp (Kiev)
- * Club domestic league appearances and goals

Andriy Oleksandrovych Malchevskyi (born 1 December 1968) is a Ukrainian former footballer who is last known to have played as a forward for Olimp (Kiev).

== Career ==
In 1996, Malchevskyi signed for Ukrainian third division side Sistema-Borex from Xorazm in Uzbekistan, before joining Ukrainian fourth division club Elektron (Romny).

In 2000, he signed for East Bengal in India after playing for Bangladeshi team Mohammedan.
