= Peter Maguire =

English footballer (born 1969)

Personal information
- Full name: Peter Jason Maguire
- Date of birth: 11 September 1969 (age 57)
- Place of birth: Holmfirth, England
- Height: 5 ft 9 in (1.75 m)
- Position: Striker

Youth career
- 1986–1988: Leeds United

Senior career*
Years	Team	Apps	(Gls)
1988–1989	Leeds United	2	(0)
1989	→ IFK Osby (loan)		
1989–1991	Huddersfield Town	7	(1)
1990	→ Stockport County (loan)	2	(0)
–	Emley		
????–2000	Elgin City^{[A]}	2	(0)
2002–200?	Forres Mechanics		
–	Lossiemouth		
- * Club domestic league appearances and goals

Peter Jason Maguire (born 11 September 1969) is a former professional footballer, born in Holmfirth, West Yorkshire, who played as a striker in the Football League for Leeds United, Huddersfield Town and Stockport County. He also played for Swedish club IFK Osby (on loan), and Emley F.C., a Yorkshire-based English Non League club, and in both the Scottish Highland Football League, and then the Scottish Football League with Elgin City F.C. when Elgin were promoted in 2000 from the Highland Football League to the Scottish Football League, and subsequently with Forres Mechanics F.C., and Lossiemouth F.C., both Scottish Highland Football League clubs.

== Notes ==
A. Figures for Scottish League games only.
