= Jamshid Nassiri =

Iranian-Indian football manager and former player (born 1959)

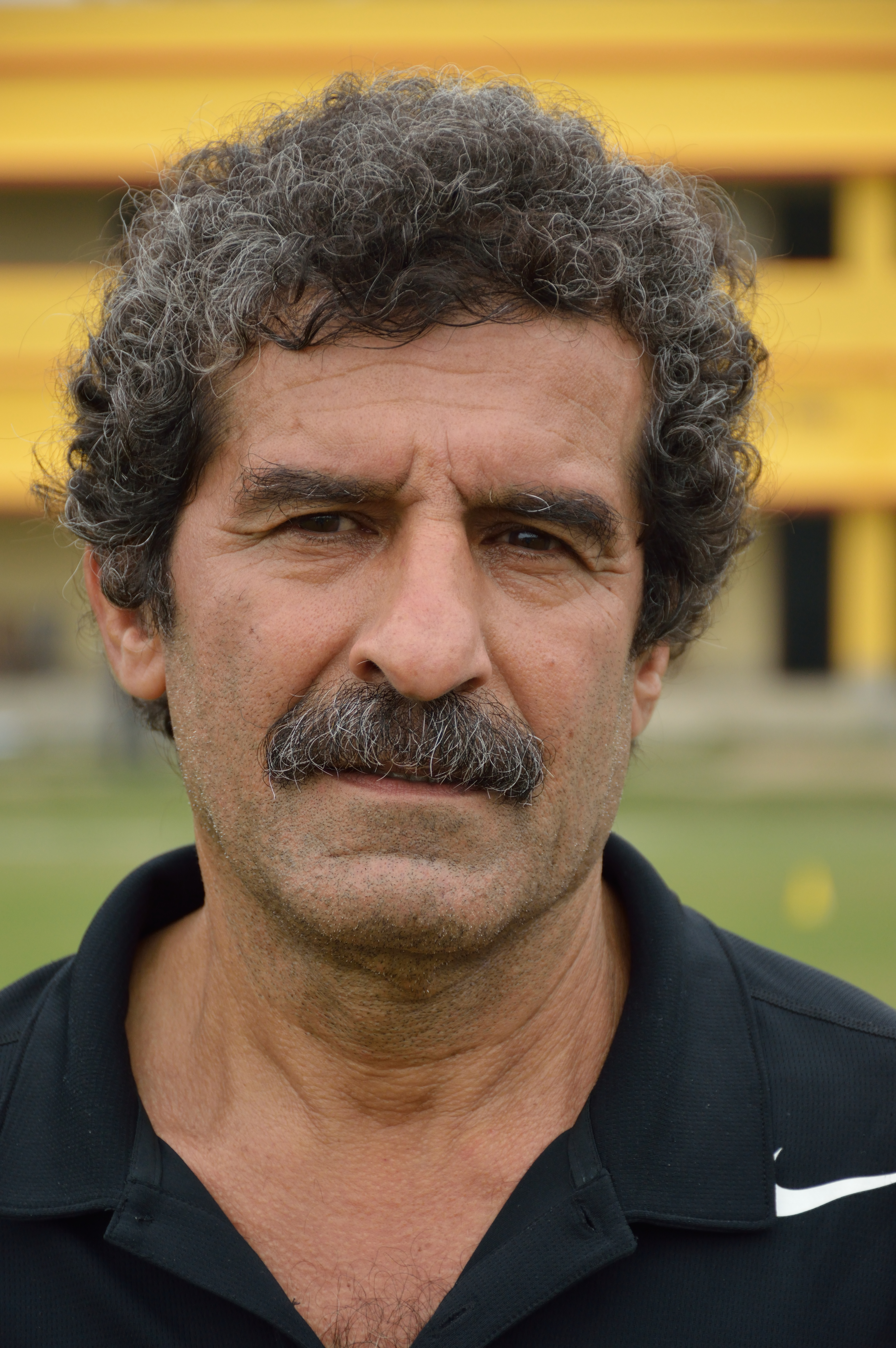
- Nassiri in February 2016

Personal information
- Full name: Jamshid Yeganeh Nassiri
- Date of birth: 23 February 1959 (age 67)
- Place of birth: Khorramshahr, Iran
- Height: 1.80 m (5 ft 11 in)
- Position: Forward

Senior career*
Years	Team	Apps	(Gls)
1977–1979	Rastakhiz Khorramshahr		(30)
1980–1981	East Bengal		(42)
1982–1985	Mohammedan	58	(44)
1985–1986	East Bengal		(30)

International career
1977	Iran U20		

Managerial career
- 1998–2001: Bengal Mumbai
- 2003: Wari AC (technical director)
- 2003–2004: Mohammedan
- 2022: Peerless (technical director)
- 2023–: Calcutta FC
- * Club domestic league appearances and goals

Jamshid Nassiri (born 23 February 1959 in Khorramshahr) is an Iranian-Indian football manager and former footballer, who is currently the head coach of the Calcutta Premier Division side Calcutta FC. Nassiri is known for forming a successful attacking duo with Majid Bishkar in the 1980s. He was one of the most expensive players in Indian football during his playing days and is the first foreign player to score 100 goals across several tournaments in the country.

Nassiri played for several clubs in India during his playing career. At the international level, he has represented Iran at the 1977 FIFA World Youth Championship. Nassiri currently lives in Kolkata and holds Indian citizenship.

== Playing career ==
Nassiri started his career at Takht Jamshid Cup side Rastakhiz Khorramshahr, but it didn't last long as the club was shut down due to Islamic revolution. In 1979, he came to India to pursue his studies and joined the Aligarh Muslim University (AMU). On seeing his performance for the university in the North Zone Inter University championship, Nassiri was signed by East Bengal along with other Iranian players Majid Bishkar and Mahmud Khabbasi. The 1980 Federation Cup was his debut tournament with the Red and Golds, where he won the tournament with them. In the same season, East Bengal also won the Rovers Cup where Nassiri played a big part.

In 1982, he was signed by Mohammedan SC. His transfer was very effective for the side as they were able to win the Federation Cup for the first time in its history. In 1984 Federation Cup final against East Bengal, he scored the winner.

His consistent form saw him returning to East Bengal in 1984 where Nassiri had an impressive run. He scored 17 goals in the Calcutta league and became the league's topscorer. He was also part of the team that won Federation Cup in 1985 and participated in 1985–86 Asian Club Championship in Saudi Arabia, under coaching of legendary footballer P. K. Banerjee. They also won the Coca Cola Cup of Central Asia.

In 1986, Nassiri had his last big transfer move, as he rejoined Mohammedan for a sum of Rs. 250,000, making him as one of the most expensive football player in the country at that time. He continued to play till the late 80's and became the first foreigner in Indian football to score more than 100 goals.

== Managerial career ==
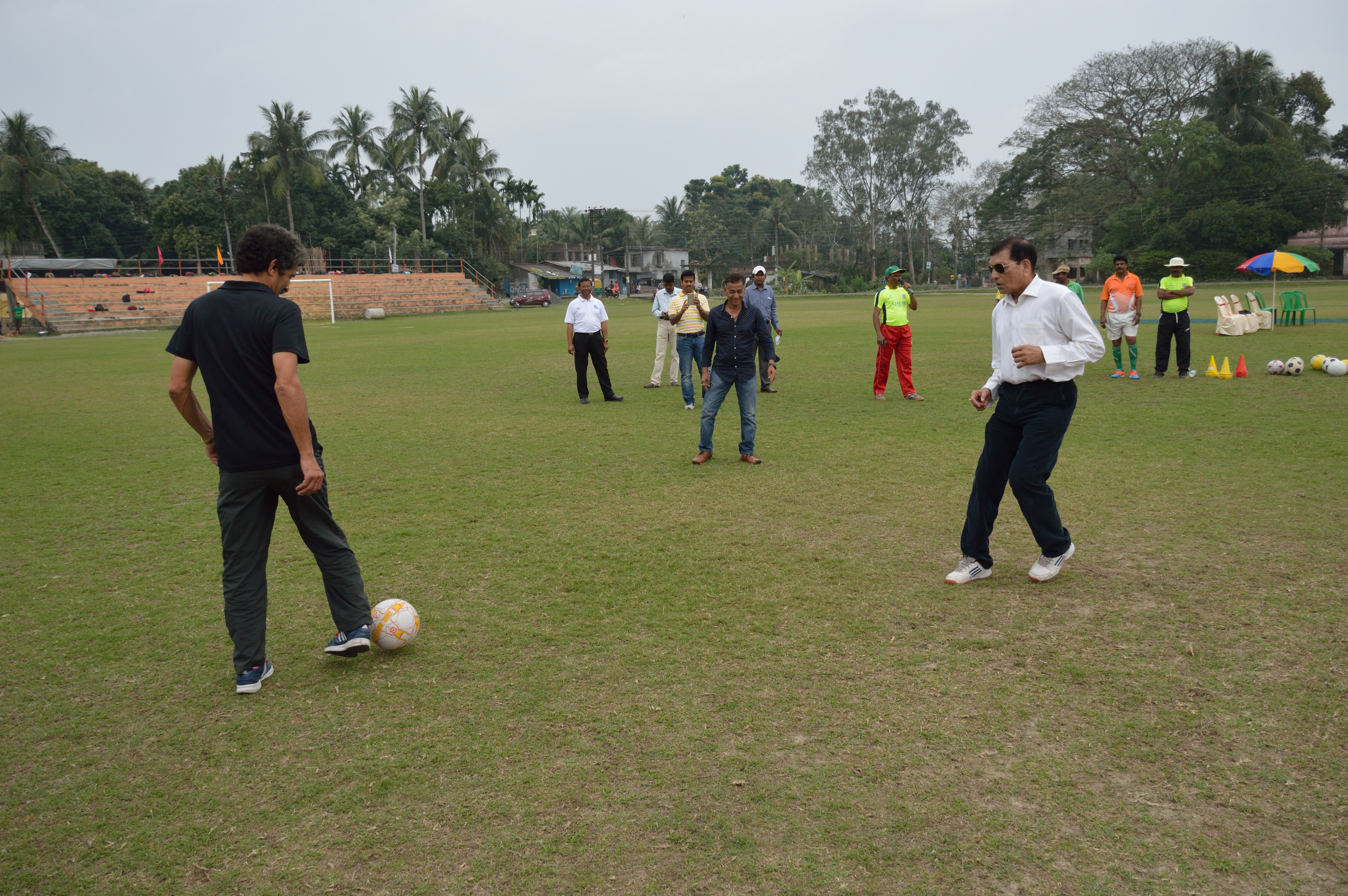
Nassiri (in left) showing his skills with legendary manager Syed Nayeemuddin at a football workshop in Baruipur, South 24 Parganas, February 2016.

Nassiri enjoyed his playing days in India and began his coaching career in the Mumbai Super Division side Bengal Mumbai. He managed the club from 1998 to 2001 and helped them winning the Rovers Cup alongside Mumbai Super Division league in 1998. In 2003, Nassiri was appointed as technical director of Wari Athletic Club, which was then promoted to Calcutta Football League Super Division.

In 2003–04 season, Nassiri managed Mohammedan Sporting in the National Football League. In 2021, he was appointed technical director of Calcutta Police Club, a CFL second division outfit. In June 2022, Nassiri acquired post of technical director in Peerless ahead of the new season of Calcutta Premier Division League. He also guided the team reaching semi-final of Naihati Gold Cup. He was later roped in by Calcutta Cricket and Football Club for rest of the league season.

== Personal life ==
I like India. I found the culture and tradition common to Iran. It was a great experience playing in front of such a massive crowd. That's the reason I preferred to stay back here.

— Jamshid Nassiri, on his life in India and relation with the country.

Since the 1980s, Nassiri lives in Kolkata. He is also a follower of Bengali traditions, foods and culture.

Nassiri is married to Susanne Giri, who is born and brought up in India, and lives in Queens Mansion on Park Street. The couple has two sons, Joshua and Kiyan Nassiri. His younger son Kiyan is a professional footballer (born 2000) currently playing for Indian Super League side Chennaiyin FC. Kiyan began his youth football career in CC&FC – where Jamshid served as coach, and appeared with Mohammedan. He then moved to Mohun Bagan and currently plays professionally for Chennaiyin FC in the Indian Super League.

== Honours ==
=== Player ===
East Bengal

- Federation Cup: 1980–81, 1985
- Rovers Cup: 1980
- IFA Shield: 1986
- Calcutta Football League: 1985
- Darjeeling Gold Cup: 1985
- Sait Nagjee Trophy: 1986
- Stafford Cup: 1986
- Coca-Cola Cup (Central Asia): 1985

Mohammedan Sporting

- Federation Cup: 1983–84, 1984–85
- IFA Shield: runner-up: 1982
- Rovers Cup: 1984; runner-up: 1982, 1983
- Sait Nagjee Trophy: 1984
- Bordoloi Trophy: 1985; runner-up: 1983
- DCM Trophy: runner-up: 1982, 1983
- Darjeeling Gold Cup: 1984

Individual

- Calcutta Football League top scorer: 1985 (with 17 goals)

=== Manager ===
Bengal Mumbai

- Rovers Cup: 1998
- Bombay Super Division League: 1998

== See also ==
- List of foreign players for East Bengal FC
- List of Indian football players in foreign leagues
