= 2013–14 in Pakistani football =

Football in Pakistan
- Season: 2013–14

Men's football
- Pakistan Premier League: Khan Research Laboratories
- Football Federation League: Pakistan Railways
- National Challenge Cup: Pakistan Air Force

Women's football
- National Women Championship: Balochistan United

The 2013–14 season was the 65th season of competitive football in Pakistan.

== Changes in the Pakistan Premier League ==
Teams promoted to the 2013–14 Pakistan Premier League:

- Lyallpur
- Pak Afghan Clearing

Teams relegated from the 2012–13 Pakistan Premier League:

- PMC Club Athletico Faisalabad
- Wohaib

Name changes:

- University F.C. → Lyallpur F.C.

== Internationals ==
=== Men ===
==== 2013 SAFF Championship ====
Team	Pld	W	D	L	GF	GA	GD	Pts
Nepal	3	2	1	0	5	2	+3	7
India	3	1	1	1	3	3	0	4
Pakistan	3	1	1	1	3	3	0	4
Bangladesh	3	0	1	2	2	5	−3	1

Source: RSSSF

1 September 2013 Group Stage	India	1 – 0	Pakistan	Kathmandu, Nepal
18:30 NPT	Ishaq 14' (o.g.)	Report		Stadium: Dasarath Rangasala Stadium; Referee: Hettikamkanamge Perera (Sri Lanka)

3 September 2013 Group Stage	Pakistan	1–1	Nepal	Kathmandu, Nepal
18:30 NPT	Bashir 14'	Report	Magar 90+2'	Stadium: Dasarath Rangasala Stadium; Referee: Saleh Al Hethlol (Saudi Arabia)

5 September 2013 Group Stage	Bangladesh	1–2	Pakistan	Kathmandu, Nepal
15:30 NPT	Ameli 30'	Report	Ishaq 36'; Kalim 90+2'	Stadium: Halchowk Stadium; Referee: Saleh Al Hethlol (Saudi Arabia)

==== Philippine Peace Cup ====
Team	Pld	W	D	L	GF	GA	GD	Pts
Philippines	2	1	0	1	4	3	+1	3
Chinese Taipei	2	1	0	1	2	2	0	3
Pakistan	2	1	0	1	2	3	−1	3

13 October 2013	Chinese Taipei	0–1	Pakistan	Bacolod, Philippines
16:00 UTC+8		Report	Rehman 7'	Stadium: Panaad Stadium; Referee: Wilfredo Bermejo (Philippines)

15 October 2013	Philippines	3–1	Pakistan	Bacolod, Philippines
19:00 UTC+8	Reichelt 33'; Greatwich 78'; Schröck 88'	Report	Kalim Ullah 15'	Stadium: Panaad Stadium; Referee: Heru Santoso (Indonesia)

==== International Friendlies ====
20 August 2013	Afghanistan	3–0	Pakistan	Kabul, Afghanistan
18.30 (UTC+5)	Ahmadi 20'; Hatifi 53'; Jamhour 72'			Stadium: Afghanistan Football Federation Stadium; Attendance: 7,000

19 February 2014	Lebanon	3–1	Pakistan	Sidon, Lebanon
15:30 (UTC+5)	Ismail 7'; Hussein Awada 15'; Tahan 86'		Kaleemullah 17'	Stadium: Saida Municipal Stadium

== Club competitions ==
=== Pakistan Premier League ===
Pos	Team	Pld	W	D	L	GF	GA	GD	Pts	Qualification or relegation
1	Khan Research Laboratories	30	20	6	4	52	10	+42	66	2014 AFC President's Cup
2	Karachi Electric Supply Corporation	30	18	10	2	47	20	+27	64	
3	WAPDA	30	17	12	1	43	14	+29	63	
4	Pakistan Airforce	30	14	8	8	41	29	+12	50	
5	Pakistan Army	30	13	9	8	35	23	+12	48	
6	Pakistan Airlines	30	13	7	10	45	40	+5	46	
7	Muslim	30	12	8	10	33	32	+1	44	
8	Karachi Port Trust	30	11	7	12	63	50	+13	40	
9	National Bank	30	9	10	11	25	25	0	37	
10	Afghan Chaman	30	9	9	12	35	36	−1	36	
11	Habib Bank	30	9	8	13	26	33	−7	35	Relegation to 2014-15 Pakistan Football Federation League
12	Pakistan Navy	30	9	8	13	28	37	−9	35	Relegation to 2014-15 Pakistan Football Federation League
13	Lyallpur	30	6	8	16	27	45	−18	26	Relegation to 2014-15 Pakistan Football Federation League
14	Pak Afghan Clearing	30	4	12	14	22	45	−23	24	Relegation to 2014-15 Pakistan Football Federation League
15	Baloch Nushki	30	5	5	20	21	58	−37	20	Relegation to 2014-15 Pakistan Football Federation League
16	Zarai Taraqiati	30	4	5	21	16	62	−46	17	Relegation to 2014-15 Pakistan Football Federation League

Source: Soccerway
Rules for classification: 1) points; 2) goal difference; 3) number of goals scored.

=== National Challenge Cup ===
Quarter-finals
31 March – 15:30 PM
National Bank	0
Karachi Port Trust	1
31 March – 15:30 PM
KESC	1
WAPDA F.C.	0
1 April – 4:00 PM
Pakistan Air Force (P)	0 (4)
Khan Research Laboratories	0 (2)
1 April – 4:00 PM
Habib Bank	1
Pakistan Airlines	0

Semi-finals
2 April – 4:00 PM
Pakistan Air Force	4
Karachi Port Trust	0
2 April – 4:00 PM
KESC	1
Habib Bank	0

Final
10 May – 4:00 PM
Pakistan Air Force	2
KESC	1

5 April 2014
16:00 PST

KESC	1–2	Pakistan Pakistan Air Force
Oludeyi Abayomi 56'		M. Mujahid 61'; Mansoor 76'

KPT Sports Complex, Karachi
