= Ali Khan Niazi =

Pakistani footballer

Personal information
- Date of birth: 14 December 2000 (age 25)
- Place of birth: Karachi, Pakistan
- Height: 1.78 m (5 ft 10 in)
- Position: Right-back

Team information
- Current team: SA Gardens

Youth career
- JAFA Soccer Academy

Senior career*
Years	Team	Apps	(Gls)
2014–2017	Huma	4	(2)
2018	Civil Aviation Authority	0	(0)
2018–2020	K-Electric	20	(0)
2020–2021	Khan Research Laboratories	15	(4)
2021–2022	Sui Southern Gas	9	(1)
2022–2026	JAFA FC		
2026–	SA Gardens		

International career^{‡}
2018	Pakistan U23		
2023–	Pakistan	6	(0)
- * Club domestic league appearances and goals as of 13 January 2019 ‡ National team caps and goals as of 26 September 2026

Ali Khan Niazi (born 14 December 2000) is a Pakistani footballer who plays as a right-back for SA Gardens and the Pakistan national team.

== Club career ==
=== Huma ===
Niazi started his youth career with JAFA Soccer Academy. He made his senior debut for Huma in the 2014–15 Pakistan Football Federation League, scoring a brace in his debut match against Mardan Blue Star. Niazi scored his first goal in the 44th minute and the second in the 91st minute of the game; he was also booked in the 89th minute. Niazi's second match of the season was a 1–0 loss to Lyallpur. His brace on debut remained his only goals in the season for Niazi, who ended his 2014–15 season with two goals in four appearances for Huma.

=== Civil Aviation Authority ===
Niazi joined departmental side Civil Aviation Authority in 2018. He made his debut for the club on 28 April, coming on as a 30th minute substitute Waseem Asghar in 2018 National Challenge Cup against Sindh Government Press. Niazi got his first full match against defending champions Khan Research Laboratories in a 1–0 victory. Niazi played in the semi-finals against eventual winners Pakistan Airforce, Civial Aviation lost the semi-finals on 4–3 on penalties. His last match for the club was third position match in Challenge Cup, where his team lost 5–1 Pakistan Petroleum.

=== K-Electric ===
Niazi joined K-Electric before the start of 2018–19 Pakistan Premier League. He made 20 appearances, and was booked 4 times during the season as K-Electric finished in the sixth position.

=== Khan Research Laboratories ===
Niazi joined Khan Research Laboratories in 2020 and spent one year in the club.

=== Sui Southern Gas ===
In 2021, he joined Sui Southern Gas of the Pakistan Premier League. He made 9 appearances in the 2021–22 season and scored a goal until the league was cancelled shortly after starting. Shortly after, the club was closed after the shutdown of departmental sports in Pakistan in 2021.

=== JAFA ===
In July 2022, Niazi returned to JAFA in between the football domestic inactivity within Pakistan.

=== SA Gardens ===
Niazi joined SA Gardens in 2026, and played with the team at the 2026 National Football Challenge Cup.

== International career ==
Niazi was included in the Pakistan under 23 squad for the 2018 Asian Games held in Jakarta. He made his debut with the senior team at the 2023 Mauritius Four Nations Cup, in a 0–1 loss against Kenya.

== Career statistics ==
=== Club ===
As of 13 January 2019

Appearances and goals by club, season and competition
Club	Season	League			National Challenge Cup		Total	
Club	Season	Division	Apps	Goals	Apps	Goals	Apps	Goals
Huma	2014–15	Football Federation League	4	2	—		4	2
Civil Aviation Authority	2018–19	Pakistan Premier League	0	0	5	0	5	0
K-Electric	2018–19	Pakistan Premier League	20	0	0	0	20	0
Career total			24	2	5	0	29	2

=== International ===
As of 10 June 2026

Appearances and goals by national team and year
National team	Year	Apps	Goals
Pakistan	2023	4	0
Pakistan	2026	2	0
Total		6	0

== Honours ==
Pakistan

- Diamond Jubilee International Football Tournament: 2026
