= Mehmood Khan (footballer, born 1991) =

Pakistani footballer (born 1991)

Personal information
- Full name: Mehmood Khan
- Date of birth: 10 June 1991 (age 35)
- Place of birth: Chaman, Pakistan
- Height: 1.65 m (5 ft 5 in)
- Position: Midfielder

Team information
- Current team: Pak Afghan
- Number: 8

Youth career
- Afghan Chaman

Senior career*
Years	Team	Apps	(Gls)
2008–2009	Afghan Chaman	16	(2)
2009	→ Karachi Port Trust (loan)		
2009–2016	Khan Research Laboratories	96	(39)
2011	→ Karachi Port Trust (loan)		
2016–2018	K-Electric	0	(0)
2018–2022	Sui Southern Gas	14	(1)
2022–	Pak Afghan		
2022	→ Aino Mina (loan)		
2023–2024	→ Khan Research Laboratories (loan)		

International career
2010–2018	Pakistan U23		
2011–2019	Pakistan	16	(0)
- * Club domestic league appearances and goals

Mehmood Khan (born 10 June 1991) is a Pakistani footballer who plays as a midfielder for Pak Afghan.

== Club career ==
=== Afghan Chaman ===
Khan made his Pakistan Premier League debut for Afghan Chaman in the 2008–09 season.

==== Loan to Karachi Port Trust ====
Khan had a brief stint at departmental side Karachi Port Trust in 2009.

=== Khan Research Laboratories ===
In 2009, Khan signed for departmental side Khan Research Laboratories (KRL), along with teammate Kaleemullah Khan. With KRL, he won three consecutive league titles, in 2011–12, 2012–13 and 2013–14, as well as three national cups, in 2012, 2015 and 2016.

He also participated in the AFC President's Cup from 2012 to 2014. He was a member of the team which reached the 2013 AFC President's Cup final, after falling 0–1 to Turkmen club Balkan FT in the final. On 10 May 2013, Khan scored a memorable Olympic goal from a corner kick in the 12th minute, in the group stage of the 2013 President Cup against Philippines club Global FC, which ended in a 2–0 victory for Khan's side.

==== Loan to Karachi Port Trust ====
Khan was again loaned briefly to Karachi Port Trust in 2011.

=== K-Electric ===
Khan signed for K-Electric in January 2016, along with his brother Dawood Khan.

=== Sui Southern Gas ===
Khan signed for SSGC FC in the 2018–19 season following the restoration of the Pakistan Premier League after three years since 2015. In 2021, SSGC club was closed after the shutdown of departmental sports in Pakistan. After the restoration of departmental sports in Pakistan, SSGC terminated contracts of the players of the squad on 26 August 2022, including Khan.

=== Pak Afghan ===
Khan subsequently moved to his hometown club Pak Afghan Clearing Agency.

==== Loan to Aino Mina ====
In 2022, Khan was loaned to Afghanistan Champions League club Aino Mina. He helped the side finishing fourth in the 2022 season.

==== Loan to Khan Research Laboratories ====
Khan returned to Khan Research Laboratories for the 2023–24 PFF National Challenge Cup.

== International career ==
Khan represented the Pakistan under-23 team at the 2010 Asian Games and in a two-match friendly series against Palestine in 2011.

Khan got his first senior team cap at the 2012 AFC Challenge Cup qualification.

After several friendlies in 2013 and 2014 with the senior team, Khan represented Pakistan at the 2014 Asian Games as part of national U-23 team against China U-23 on 22 September 2014, in a 1–0 loss.

In February 2015, Khan played in a friendly against Afghanistan, ending in a 2-1 victory for Pakistan. He was subsequently called in the 2018 FIFA World Cup qualification against Yemen. Khan missed international exposure for the next 3 years, as Pakistan was suspended from all football activities by FIFA on 10 October 2017. For three years since March 2015, Pakistan remained suspended from any international competition because of the crisis created inside the Pakistan Football Federation.

In 2018, Khan participated in Pakistan tour to Bahrain for test matches as a preparation for the 2018 Asian Games and the 2018 SAFF Championship, when his national side returned to international circuit after 3 years. In the 2018 SAFF Championship, Pakistan terminated the campaign sealing its place in the semi-finals. He was also called for a two-match friendly series against Palestine the same year. In 2019, Khan played in the 2022 World Cup qualification against Cambodia, as Pakistan failed to qualify for the next round. This was before Pakistan were once again suspended from all football activities by FIFA on 7 April 2021.

== Personal life ==
Mehmood's brother Dawood Khan is also a footballer, and has played alongside him at KRL and K-Electric.

== Career statistics ==
=== International ===
As of match played 12 September 2019

Appearances and goals by national team and year
National team	Year	Apps	Goals
Pakistan	2011	2	0
Pakistan	2013	1	0
Pakistan	2014	3	0
Pakistan	2015	3	0
Pakistan	2018	6	0
Pakistan	2019	1	0
Total		16	0

== Honours ==
Khan Research Laboratories

- Pakistan Premier League: 2011–12, 2012–13, 2013–14
- National Football Challenge Cup: 2012, 2015, 2016
