= 2020 National Challenge Cup =

Tournament details
- Country: Pakistan
- Venue: Lahore
- Dates: 30 November – 20 December
- Teams: 28

Final positions
- Champions: WAPDA (1st title)
- Runners-up: Sui Southern Gas
- Third place: Pakistan Army
- Fourth place: Karachi Port Trust

Tournament statistics
- Matches played: 58
- Goals scored: 148 (2.55 per match)
- Top goal scorer: Umair Ali (7 goals)

Awards
- Best Player: Saddam Hussain (SSGC)
- Best goalkeeper: Abdul Basit (WAPDA)
- All statistics correct as of 20 December 2023.

The 2020 National Challenge Cup was the 29th edition of domestic association football cup competition in Pakistan. 28 teams participated in the competition, held from 30 November to 20 December 2020. The competition was held in Lahore, with Punjab Stadium and Fame FC Ground hosting all the matches. In contrary to the departments-only format of the National Challenge Cup, the 2020 editionunder the FIFA-appointed PFF Normalisation Committee, the field was enlarged to 28 teams and for the first time in over a decade included both departments and private clubs, in an effort to revive competition during administrative suspension and the COVID-19 pandemic.

WAPDA won their maiden title after beating Sui Southern Gas 1–0 in the final.

== Teams ==
The 28 teams participating in the tournament were:

- Afghan Chaman
- Asia Ghee Mills
- Baloch Nushki
- Baloch Quetta
- Falcon Company
- Hazara Coal Company
- Higher Education Commission
- Huma F.C.
- Karachi Port Trust
- Karachi United
- Khan Research Laboratories (PPL)
- Lyallpur
- Masha United
- National Bank
- NIMSO FC
- Pakistan Air Force
- Pakistan Army (TH)
- Civil Aviation Authority
- Pakistan Navy
- Pakistan Police
- Popo
- SA Farms
- SA Gardens
- Saif Textiles
- Sui Northern Gas
- Sui Southern Gas
- WAPDA
- Wohaib

Notes
TH = Challenge Cup title holders; PPL = Pakistan Premier League winners

== Group stage ==
=== Group A ===
| Pos | Team | Pld | W | D | L | GF | GA | GD | Pts | Qualification |
|---|---|---|---|---|---|---|---|---|---|---|
| 1 | Pakistan Army | 3 | 3 | 0 | 0 | 8 | 0 | +8 | 9 | Advance to Knockout round |
| 2 | Higher Education Commission | 3 | 1 | 1 | 1 | 3 | 3 | 0 | 4 | Advance to Knockout round |
| 3 | Baloch Nushki | 3 | 1 | 0 | 2 | 2 | 4 | −2 | 3 | |
| 4 | Pakistan Police | 3 | 0 | 1 | 2 | 2 | 8 | −6 | 1 | |

Updated to match(es) played on 9 December 2020. Source: GSA

=== Group B ===
| Pos | Team | Pld | W | D | L | GF | GA | GD | Pts | Qualification |
|---|---|---|---|---|---|---|---|---|---|---|
| 1 | National Bank | 3 | 2 | 0 | 1 | 4 | 1 | +3 | 6 | Advance to Knockout round |
| 2 | Falcon Company | 3 | 2 | 0 | 1 | 4 | 2 | +2 | 6 | Advance to Knockout round |
| 3 | Karachi United | 3 | 2 | 0 | 1 | 4 | 2 | +2 | 6 | Advance to Knockout round |
| 4 | Huma | 3 | 0 | 0 | 3 | 0 | 7 | −7 | 0 | |

Updated to match(es) played on 9 December 2020. Source: GSA

=== Group C ===
| Pos | Team | Pld | W | D | L | GF | GA | GD | Pts | Qualification |
|---|---|---|---|---|---|---|---|---|---|---|
| 1 | Khan Research Laboratories | 3 | 3 | 0 | 0 | 17 | 1 | +16 | 9 | Advance to Knockout round |
| 2 | Karachi Port Trust | 3 | 1 | 1 | 1 | 6 | 5 | +1 | 4 | Advance to Knockout round |
| 3 | Popo | 3 | 1 | 1 | 1 | 4 | 12 | −8 | 4 | |
| 4 | Saif Textiles Mills | 3 | 0 | 0 | 3 | 3 | 12 | −9 | 0 | |

Updated to match(es) played on 9 December 2020. Source: GSA

=== Group D ===
| Pos | Team | Pld | W | D | L | GF | GA | GD | Pts | Qualification |
|---|---|---|---|---|---|---|---|---|---|---|
| 1 | Civil Aviation Authority | 3 | 2 | 1 | 0 | 7 | 1 | +6 | 7 | Advance to Knockout round |
| 2 | Afghan Chaman | 3 | 1 | 1 | 1 | 4 | 5 | −1 | 4 | Advance to Knockout round |
| 3 | Baloch Quetta | 3 | 1 | 1 | 1 | 2 | 4 | −2 | 4 | |
| 4 | Lyallpur | 3 | 0 | 1 | 2 | 1 | 4 | −3 | 1 | |

Updated to match(es) played on 9 December 2020. Source: GSA

=== Group E ===
| Pos | Team | Pld | W | D | L | GF | GA | GD | Pts | Qualification |
|---|---|---|---|---|---|---|---|---|---|---|
| 1 | WAPDA | 3 | 1 | 2 | 0 | 5 | 2 | +3 | 5 | Advance to Knockout round |
| 2 | SA Farms | 3 | 1 | 1 | 1 | 4 | 2 | +2 | 4 | Advance to Knockout round |
| 3 | Pakistan Navy | 3 | 1 | 1 | 1 | 1 | 1 | 0 | 4 | Advance to Knockout round |
| 4 | Asia Ghee Mills | 3 | 1 | 0 | 2 | 2 | 7 | −5 | 3 | |

Updated to match(es) played on 9 December 2020. Source: GSA

=== Group F ===
| Pos | Team | Pld | W | D | L | GF | GA | GD | Pts | Qualification |
|---|---|---|---|---|---|---|---|---|---|---|
| 1 | Sui Southern Gas | 3 | 3 | 0 | 0 | 9 | 2 | +7 | 9 | Advance to Knockout round |
| 2 | SA Gardens | 3 | 1 | 1 | 1 | 4 | 5 | −1 | 4 | Advance to Knockout round |
| 3 | Wohaib | 3 | 0 | 2 | 1 | 1 | 4 | −3 | 2 | |
| 4 | Masha United | 3 | 0 | 1 | 2 | 2 | 5 | −3 | 1 | |

Updated to match(es) played on 9 December 2020. Source: GSA

=== Group G ===
| Pos | Team | Pld | W | D | L | GF | GA | GD | Pts | Qualification |
|---|---|---|---|---|---|---|---|---|---|---|
| 1 | Pakistan Air Force | 3 | 2 | 1 | 0 | 10 | 3 | +7 | 7 | Advance to Knockout round |
| 2 | Hazara Coal Company | 3 | 1 | 2 | 0 | 3 | 2 | +1 | 5 | Advance to Knockout round |
| 3 | NIMSO | 3 | 0 | 2 | 1 | 1 | 7 | −6 | 2 | |
| 4 | Sui Northern Gas | 3 | 0 | 1 | 2 | 2 | 4 | −2 | 1 | |

Updated to match(es) played on 9 December 2020. Source: GSA

=== Ranking of third-placed teams ===
| Pos | Grp | Team | Pld | W | D | L | GF | GA | GD | Pts | Qualification |
|---|---|---|---|---|---|---|---|---|---|---|---|
| 1 | B | Karachi United | 3 | 2 | 0 | 1 | 4 | 2 | +2 | 6 | Advance to Knockout round |
| 2 | E | Pakistan Navy | 3 | 1 | 1 | 1 | 1 | 1 | 0 | 4 | Advance to Knockout round |
| 3 | D | Baloch Quetta | 3 | 1 | 1 | 1 | 2 | 4 | −2 | 4 | |
| 4 | C | Popo | 3 | 1 | 1 | 1 | 4 | 12 | −8 | 4 | |
| 5 | A | Baloch Nushki | 3 | 1 | 0 | 2 | 2 | 4 | −2 | 3 | |
| 6 | F | Wohaib | 3 | 0 | 2 | 1 | 1 | 4 | −3 | 2 | |
| 7 | G | NIMSO | 3 | 0 | 2 | 1 | 1 | 7 | −6 | 2 | |

Source: GSA
Rules for classification: 1) Higher number of points obtained; 2) Superior goal difference; 3) Higher number of goals scored; 4) Fair play conduct.

== Statistics ==
=== Top goalscorers ===
As of 20 December 2020

| Rank | Player | Team | Goals |
|---|---|---|---|
| 1 | Umair Ali | Khan Research Laboratories | 7 |
| 2 | Muhammad Waheed | Civil Aviation Authority | 6 |
| 2 | Essa Bahader | SA Gardens | 6 |
| 2 | Ashfaqquddin Babar | WAPDA | 6 |
| 5 | Muhammad Faisal Yaseen | Pakistan Air Force | 5 |
| 6 | Muhammad Tahir | Sui Southern Gas | 4 |
| 6 | Muhammad | Karachi Port Trust | 4 |
| 6 | Iftikhar Ali Khan | Khan Research Laboratories | 4 |
| 6 | Saddam Hussain | Sui Southern Gas | 4 |
| 10 | Mudassar Zafar | Khan Research Laboratories | 3 |

=== Awards ===
As of 20 December 2020

| Award | Player | Club |
|---|---|---|
| Top Scorer | Umair Ali | Khan Research Laboratories |
| Most Valuable Player | Saddam Hussain | Sui Southern Gas |
| Best Goalkeeper | Abdul Basit Ghafoor | WAPDA |
