= 2023–24 National Challenge Cup =

2023–2024 National Challenge Cup
National Challenge Cup

Tournament details
- Country: Pakistan
- Dates: 24 January 2023 – 12 May 2024
- Teams: 27

Final positions
- Champions: WAPDA
- Runners-up: SA Gardens
- Third place: Pakistan Army
- Fourth place: Higher Education Commission

Tournament statistics
- Top goal scorer: Shayak Dost (8 goals)

Awards
- Best player: Muhammad Umar Hayat
- Best goalkeeper: Salman ul Haq
- All statistics correct as of 12 May 2024.

The 2023–2024 National Challenge Cup was the 30th edition of domestic football cup competition in Pakistan. The cup competition, which ran from 24 January 2023 until 12 May 2024, featured 27 departmental teams from across the country vying for the title, which was defended by the 2020 champions WAPDA.

Initially scheduled to be held throughout 2023, the second phase was held in May 2024 after almost 15 months of inactivity.

== Background ==
The tournament took place after a gap of nearly three-and-a-half years because of the Pakistan Football Federation's suspension by FIFA due to a power struggle within the Pakistan Football Federation. FIFA lifted the ban imposed on PFF after the legitimate Normalization Committee body was restored.

The tournament was announced briefly after departmental sports in Pakistan were restored in August 2022 by Prime Minister Shehbaz Sharif. Many of the departmental clubs were disbanded following the shutdown of departmental sports in Pakistan in September 2021. Departmental teams were then restricted to the National Challenge Cup, following their controversial participation in the Pakistani domestic league setup in the previous years. A PFF official stated that from now on, there will be separate competitions for departments and clubs. When a domestic league is held, it will be solely for clubs.

The PFF Constitution stated that all departmental players need to be “affiliated with a club”, with some teams taking advantage of it such as POPO FC, which had their team playing the Challenge Cup under the department with the name of Mamsons Builders. Lyallpur FC competed under the name of Otto Cranes.

== Format ==
In the first phase, teams, bracketed in seven groups, competed on home and away basis. The leading two teams from each group and the two best third-placed sides progressed to the round of 16. The first phase was held at Karachi, Lahore, Bahawalpur, Faisalabad, Peshawar, Quetta, Chaman, Rawalpindi and Islamabad simultaneously.

The second phase was set to be conducted from May 1 to 12 in 2023 at a centre yet to be decided. It was postponed to kick off on the 21st of October until 6 November 2023. After an uncertain inactivity almost 15 months after it began, the National Challenge Cup knockout stage was finally announced to reach its end in Lahore from May 1 to 12 in 2024. The venue was ultimately shifted to Islamabad, with Jinnah Stadium hosting the semifinals and final, and the group stage and the rest of knockout round at local nearby grounds.

== Teams ==
The 27 teams participating in the tournament are as below:

- Khan Research Laboratories
- WAPDA
- Pakistan Air Force
- Gwadar Port Authority
- Pakistan Navy
- Pakistan Army
- Pakistan Police
- Hazara Coal Company
- Asia Ghee Mills
- POF Wah
- Ashraf Sugar Mills
- NIMSO
- Otto Cranes (Lyallpur FC)
- Masha United
- Pak Afghan Clearing Agency
- SA Gardens
- Saif Textiles
- Muslim Hands
- Hussain Homes Textiles
- MILO
- Klash Mills
- Mamsons Builders (POPO FC)
- WSTC
- BHCC
- SA Farms
- Pakistan Railways
- Higher Education Commission

== First phase ==
=== Group A ===
Pos	Team	Pld	W	D	L	GF	GA	GD	Pts	Qualification
1	Pakistan Navy	2	1	0	1	1	1	0	3	Advance to Second phase
2	Pakistan Police	2	1	0	1	1	1	0	3	Advance to Second phase
3	Gwadar Port Authority (W)	0	0	0	0	0	0	0	0	

Updated to match(es) played on 14 February 2023. Source: PFF (Twitter)
(W) ?

Gwadar Port Authority withdrew due to their internal issues.

24 January 2023

Pakistan Navy	1–0	Pakistan Police
Noman 69'	Report

KPT Stadium, Karachi

30 January 2023

Pakistan Police	1–0	Pakistan Navy
Hasnain 46'	Report

KPT Stadium, Karachi

=== Group B ===
Pos	Team	Pld	W	D	L	GF	GA	GD	Pts	Qualification
1	Pak Afghan Clearing Agency	6	5	1	0	0	0	0	16	Advance to Second phase
2	NIMSO	6	4	1	1	0	0	0	13	Advance to Second phase
3	MILO	6	1	1	4	0	0	0	4	
4	Hazara Coal Company	6	0	1	5	0	0	0	1	

Updated to match(es) played on 14 February 2023. Source: PFF (Twitter)
24 January 2023

Pak Afghan Clearing Agency	6–1	NIMSO
Sharaf (?) ? (?) ? (?) ? (?)	Report	? (?)

Essa Khan Football Ground, Chaman

25 January 2023

MILO	1–1	Hazara Coal Company
Mohammad Saleem (?)	Report	Syed Haider 12'

Ayub National Stadium, Quetta

28 January 2023

MILO	0–3	Pak Afghan Clearing Agency
	Report	Sharaf 16'; Yar Mohammad 36', 53'

Ayub National Stadium, Quetta

29 January 2023

Hazara Coal Company	1–3	NIMSO
	Report

Ayub National Stadium, Quetta

1 February 2023

Pak Afghan Clearing Agency	?–?	Hazara Coal Company

Essa Khan Football Ground, Chaman

2 February 2023

NIMSO	1–0	MILO
Raza (?)	Report

Ayub National Stadium, Quetta

4 February 2023

NIMSO	1–1	Pak Afghan Clearing Agency
Raza 11'	Report	Manan 63'

Yazdan Khan Model High School, Quetta

5 February 2023

Hazara Coal Company	1–2	MILO
Jamshed Ahmad 79'	Report	Saleem 83', 86'

Yazdan Khan Model High School, Quetta

8 February 2023

Hazara Coal Company	?–?	Pak Afghan Clearing Agency

Ayub National Stadium, Quetta

9 February 2023

MILO	0–1	NIMSO
	Report	Raza (?)

11 February 2023

NIMSO	?–?	Hazara Coal Company

Ayub National Stadium, Quetta

12 February 2023

Pak Afghan Clearing Agency	?–?	MILO

Essa Khan Football Ground, Chaman

=== Group C ===
Pos	Team	Pld	W	D	L	GF	GA	GD	Pts	Qualification
1	Asia Ghee Mills	6	4	1	1	0	0	0	13	Advance to Second phase
2	Pakistan Railways	6	2	3	1	0	0	0	9	Advance to Second phase
3	Ashraf Sugar Mills	6	2	1	3	0	0	0	7	
4	Hussain Homes Textiles	6	1	1	4	0	0	0	4	

Updated to match(es) played on 14 February 2023. Source: PFF (Twitter)
24 January 2023

Pakistan Railways	0–0	Ashraf Sugar Mills
	Report

Gulzar Sadiq Park, Bahawalpur

25 January 2023

Asia Ghee Mills	?–?	Hussain Textile

Gulzar Sadiq Park, Bahawalpur

28 January 2023

Pakistan Railways	0–0	Hussain Textile

Gulzar Sadiq Park, Bahawalpur

29 January 2023

Asia Ghee Mills	2–1	Ashraf Sugar Mills
	Report

Gulzar Sadiq Park, Bahawalpur

1 February 2023

Pakistan Railways	1–3	Asia Ghee Mills
Siraj Uddin 70'	Report	Fareed Ullah 12'; Mohammad Jamil 62'; Mohammad Hasan 75'

Gulzar Sadiq Park, Bahawalpur

2 February 2023

Hussain Textiles	0–2	Ashraf Sugar Mills
	Report	Nasir 12'; Kashif (?)

Gulzar Sadiq Park, Bahawalpur

4 February 2023

Ashraf Sugar Mills	0–1	Pakistan Railways
	Report	Asmat Khan (?)

Gulzar Sadiq Park, Bahawalpur

5 February 2023

Hussain Textile	2–4	Asia Ghee Mills
Mohammad Muawiya (?); Syed Moosa Qasim 30'	Report	Amir Sohail 13'; Syed Haider Ali 51'; Mohammad Hasan 55', 89'

Gulzar Sadiq Park, Bahawalpur

8 February 2023

Hussain Home Textile	0–0	Pakistan Railways
	Report

Gulzar Sadiq Park, Bahawalpur

9 February 2023

Ashraf Sugar Mills	2–1	Asia Ghee Mills
Muhammad Umair Ashraf (?)	Report	Hassan (?)

Gulzar Sadiq Park, Bahawalpur

11 February 2023

Pakistan Railways	1–1	Asia Ghee Mills
Sirajuddin 20'	Report	Mohammad Hassan 67'

Gulzar Sadiq Park, Bahawalpur

12 February 2023

Ashraf Sugar Mills	0–2	Hussain Textiles
	Report	Rehman Akhter (?); Asad Ali (?)

Gulzar Sadiq Park, Bahawalpur

=== Group D ===
Pos	Team	Pld	W	D	L	GF	GA	GD	Pts	Qualification
1	Otto Cranes	6	4	2	0	0	0	0	14	Advance to Second phase
2	SA Farms	6	3	1	2	0	0	0	10	Advance to Second phase
3	Masha United	6	3	1	2	0	0	0	10	Advance to Second phase
4	Klash Mills	6	0	0	6	0	0	0	0	

Updated to match(es) played on 14 February 2023. Source: PFF (Twitter)
24 January 2023

Masha United	3–0	Klash Mills
Musaddaq (?)	Report

Panther Ground, Faisalabad

25 January 2023

SA Farms	2–2	Otto Cranes
Hussain 3'; Sufyan 4'	Report	Haider 37'; Hussain 69'

Panther Ground, Faisalabad

28 January 2023

Masha United	1–1	Otto Cranes
Ikram 45'	Report	Naveed 74'

Panther Ground, Faisalabad

29 January 2023

Klash Mills	0–1	SA Farms
	Report

Dhanola Ground, Faisalabad

1 February 2023

Masha United	4–2	SA Farms
Ikram (?); Musaddiq (?); Ibrar (?)	Report	Hamza (?)

Panther Ground, Faisalabad

2 February 2023

Klash Mills	0–3	Otto Cranes
	Report	Haider (?); Hasnain (?)

Dhanola Ground, Faisalabad

4 February 2023

Klash Mills	0–1	Masha United
	Report	Nadeem (?)

Dhanola Ground, Faisalabad

5 February 2023

Otto Cranes	2–0	SA Farms
Hussain (?); Sagar (?)	Report

Agriculture University Ground, Faisalabad

8 February 2023

Otto Cranes	2–1	Masha United
Abdul Rehman 14'; Hussain Shah 58'	Report	Usman 68'

Agriculture University Ground, Faisalabad

9 February 2023

SA Farms	6–0	Klash Mills
Ali (?); Sufyan (?); Hussain (?)	Report

Panther Ground, Faisalabad

11 February 2023

SA Farms	4–2	Masha United
Ali 14' (?); Atif (?); Usama (?)	Report	Yousuf 45', 90'

Panther Ground, Faisalabad

12 February 2023

Otto Cranes	4–1	Klash Mills
Haider Ali (?)	Report	Shahraiz (?)

Agriculture University Ground, Faisalabad

=== Group E ===
Pos	Team	Pld	W	D	L	GF	GA	GD	Pts	Qualification
1	WAPDA	6	3	3	0	0	0	0	12	Advance to Second phase
2	SA Gardens	6	2	3	1	0	0	0	9	Advance to Second phase
3	Higher Education Commission	6	1	4	1	0	0	0	7	Advance to Second phase
4	Saif Textiles	6	1	0	5	0	0	0	3	

Updated to match(es) played on 14 February 2023. Source: PFF (Twitter)
24 January 2023

WAPDA	2–2	Higher Education Commission
	Report

Railway Stadium, Lahore

25 January 2023

SA Gardens	3–0	Saif Textile
Shakeel Ahmed 48'; Umair 72'; Murtaza 88'	Report

SA Garden Ground, Lahore

28 January 2023

SA Gardens	1–1	WAPDA
Omar Saeed 16'	Report	Faisal 86'

SA Gardens Stadium, Lahore

29 January 2023

Saif Textile	0–2	Higher Education Commission
	Report

Fame Football Ground, Lahore

1 February 2023

WAPDA	5–0	Saif Textile
Faheem 1'; Dost 9', 56', 61'; Uzair 74'	Report

Punjab University Football Ground, Lahore

2 February 2023

Higher Education Commission	0–0	SA Gardens
	Report

Punjab University Football Ground, Lahore

4 February 2023

Higher Education Commission	0–0	WAPDA
	Report

Punjab University Football Ground, Lahore

5 February 2023

Saif Textile	1–3	SA Gardens
Abdul Kalam 86'	Report	Mohammad Umair 32'; Murtaza 42'; Samnan 86'

Fame Football Ground, Lahore

8 February 2023

Saif Textile	0–3	WAPDA
	Report	Adeel Ali 35'; Dost 35'; Faheem 41'

Fame Football Ground, Lahore

9 February 2023

SA Gardens	2–2	Higher Education Commission
Murtaza (?); Touqeer (?)	Report	Waqas (?); Rehman (?)

SA Gardens Stadium, Lahore

11 February 2023

WAPDA	1–0	SA Gardens
Adeel Ali 11'	Report

Punjab University Football Ground, Lahore

12 February 2023

Higher Education Commission	0–1	Saif Textile
	Report	Asad (?)

Punjab University Football Ground, Lahore

=== Group F ===
Pos	Team	Pld	W	D	L	GF	GA	GD	Pts	Qualification
1	Khan Research Laboratories	6	5	1	0	0	0	0	16	Advance to Second phase
2	Pakistan Army	6	4	1	1	0	0	0	13	Advance to Second phase
3	Muslim Hands	6	1	0	5	0	0	0	3	
4	POF Wah	6	1	0	5	0	0	0	3	

Updated to match(es) played on 14 February 2023. Source: PFF (Twitter)
24 January 2023

Khan Research Laboratories	7–0	POF Wah
Moin Ahmed (?); Waheed (?) ? (?) ? (?)	Report

KRL Football Stadium, Rawalpindi

25 January 2023

Muslim Hands	0–2	Pakistan Army
	Report	Afzaal 64'; Dabeer Hussain 72'

Municipal Stadium, Rawalpindi

28 January 2023

Muslim Hands	0–1	Khan Research Laboratories
	Report	Iftikhar Ali 90'

Municipal Stadium, Rawalpindi

29 January 2023

Pakistan Army	4–0	POF Wah
Qadeer Hussain (?) ? (?)	Report

Army Stadium, Rawalpindi

1 February 2023

Khan Research Laboratories	0–0	Pakistan Army
	Report

KRL Football Stadium, Rawalpindi

2 February 2023

POF Wah	1–0	Muslim Hands
Zain-ul-Aabdeen (?)	Report

POF Ground, Wah Cantt

4 February 2023

POF Wah	0–2	Khan Research Laboratories
	Report	Iftikhar Ali (?); Waheed (?)

POF Ground, Wah Cantt

5 February 2023

Pakistan Army	3–0	Muslim Hands
Afzaal 45'; Sarfaraz 65'; Abrar 78'	Report

Army Stadium, Rawalpindi

8 February 2023

Pakistan Army	0–2	Khan Research Laboratories
	Report	Waheed 17', 48'

Army Stadium, Rawalpindi

9 February 2023

Muslim Hands	5–3	POF Wah
Ali (?); Shahid (?); Asim (?); Tufail (?); Sajid (?)	Report	Zain (?); Haider (?)

Municipal Stadium, Rawalpindi

11 February 2023

Khan Research Laboratories	2–0	Muslim Hands
Waheed 41'; Najeebullah 90'	Report

KRL Football Stadium, Rawalpindi

12 February 2023

POF Wah	0–3	Pakistan Army
	Report	Qadeer Hussain (?)

POF Ground, Wah Cantt

=== Group G ===
Pos	Team	Pld	W	D	L	GF	GA	GD	Pts	Qualification
1	Pakistan Air Force	6	4	1	1	0	0	0	13	Advance to Second phase
2	WSTC	6	3	1	2	0	0	0	10	Advance to Second phase
3	Mamsons Builders	6	2	1	3	0	0	0	7	
4	BHCC	6	1	1	4	0	0	0	4	

Updated to match(es) played on 14 February 2023. Source: PFF (Twitter)
24 January 2023

WSTC	2–2	Pakistan Air Force
	Report

Tehmas Khan Football Stadium, Peshawar

25 January 2023

Mamsons Builders	1–1	BHCC
Mohammad Rizwan 31'	Report	Afridi 74'

Tehmas Khan Football Stadium, Peshawar

28 January 2023

WSTC	1–2	Mamsons Builders
	Report

Tehmas Khan Football Stadium, Peshawar

29 January 2023

BHCC	0–3	Pakistan Air Force
	Report

Tehmas Khan Football Stadium, Peshawar

1 February 2023

Mamsons Builders	1–3	Pakistan Air Force
Waleed 32'	Report	Samad (?); Essa (?); Muhammad Mujahid (?)

Tehmas Khan Football Stadium, Peshawar

2 February 2023

WSTC	2–1	BHCC
Zahid (?); Rizwan (?)	Report	Riaz (?)

Tehmas Khan Football Stadium, Peshawar

4 February 2023

Pakistan Air Force	4–0	WSTC
Abdul Samad 46'; Essa 70'; Mansoor Khan 75'; Faisal 88'	Report

PAF Sports Complex, Peshawar

5 February 2023

BHCC	2–1	Mamsons Builders
Rehmatullah 53'; Danish 76'	Report	Waleed 42'

Tehmas Khan Football Stadium, Peshawar

8 February 2023

Pakistan Air Force	3–0	BHCC
Fahim 45'; Essa 62'; Naik Alam 72'	Report

PAF Sports Complex, Peshawar

9 February 2023

Mamsons Builders	1–3	WSTC
Adeel Younas (?)	Report	Rizwan (?); Maab (?)

Tehmas Khan Football Stadium, Peshawar

11 February 2023

BHCC	0–1	WSTC
	Report	Rizwan 88'

Tehmas Khan Football Stadium, Peshawar

12 February 2023

Pakistan Air Force	1–2	Mamsons Builders
Samad (?)	Report	Taha (?); Adeel Younas (?)

PAF Sports Complex, Peshawar

== Second phase ==
=== Group A ===
Pos	Team	Pld	W	D	L	GF	GA	GD	Pts	Qualification
1	Pakistan Army	3	3	0	0	10	1	+9	9	Advance to Quarter-finals
2	Higher Education Commission	3	2	0	1	5	4	+1	6	Advance to Quarter-finals
3	Pak Afghan Clearing Agency	3	1	0	2	2	6	−4	3	
4	NIMSO	3	0	0	3	2	8	−6	0	

Updated to match(es) played on 5 May 2024. Source: GSA
1 May 2024
14:00 PST

NIMSO	1–3	Higher Education Commission
Zulfiqar Ali (?)	Report	Fakhar Abbas (?); Ahmed Hassan (?); Hammad Hassan (?)

1 May 2024
16:30 PST

Pak Afghan Clearing Agency	0–4	Pakistan Army
	Report	Qadeer Hussain (?); Abrar (?); Salman (?)

3 May 2024
14:00 PST

Pakistan Army	3–1	Higher Education Commission
Afzaal 15'; Umair Ali 28'; Haris 52'	Report	Muhammad Inam 83'

3 May 2024
16:30 PST

Pak Afghan Clearing Agency	2–1	NIMSO
Sharab Khan (?)	Report	Musaveer (?)

5 May 2024
14:00 PST

Pak Afghan Clearing Agency	0–1	Higher Education Commission
	Report	Haleem (?)

5 May 2024
16:30 PST

NIMSO	0–3	Pakistan Army
	Report	Anees (?); Hassan (?)

=== Group B ===
Pos	Team	Pld	W	D	L	GF	GA	GD	Pts	Qualification
1	Khan Research Laboratories	3	2	0	1	8	3	+5	6	Advance to Quarter-finals
2	Pakistan Navy	3	2	0	1	6	2	+4	6	Advance to Quarter-finals
3	Masha United	3	1	1	1	1	4	−3	4	
4	SA Farms	3	0	1	2	0	6	−6	1	

Updated to match(es) played on 5 May 2024. Source: GSA
1 May 2024
14:00 PST

SA Farms	0–0	Masha United
	Report

1 May 2024
16:30 PST

Khan Research Laboratories	1–3	Pakistan Navy
Ali Agha (?)	Report	Noman Dodo (?); Muhammad Naeem (?); Abdul Rehman (?)

3 May 2024
14:00 PST

Pakistan Navy	0–1	Masha United
	Report	Mujahid Hussain (?)

3 May 2024
16:30 PST

Khan Research Laboratories	3–0	SA Farms
Najeebullah 51', 90'; Waqar Baloch 77'	Report

5 May 2024
14:00 PST

Khan Research Laboratories	4–0	Masha United
Shahzaib (?); Najeebullah (?); Waheed (?); Ali Agha (?)	Report

5 May 2024
16:30 PST

SA Farms	0–3	Pakistan Navy
	Report	Nauman (?); Farhanullah (?); Naveed (?)

=== Group C ===
Pos	Team	Pld	W	D	L	GF	GA	GD	Pts	Qualification
1	WAPDA	3	3	0	0	11	3	+8	9	Advance to Quarter-finals
2	WSTC	3	1	1	1	5	6	−1	4	Advance to Quarter-finals
3	Otto Cranes	3	1	0	2	6	9	−3	3	
4	Pakistan Police	3	0	1	2	2	6	−4	1	

Updated to match(es) played on 6 May 2024. Source: GSA
2 May 2024
14:00 PST

WSTC	1–1	Pakistan Police
Mohib Ullah (?)	Report	Qurban Ali Hazara (?)

2 May 2024
16:30 PST

Otto Cranes	2–5	WAPDA
Sagar Masih (?)	Report	Dost (?); Ahmed Faheem (?); Umar Hayat (?)

4 May 2024
14:00 PST

WAPDA	3–0	Pakistan Police
Ghazi (?); Dost (?)	Report

4 May 2024
16:30 PST

Otto Cranes	2–3	WSTC
Muhammad Saad (?); Saddam Hussain (?)	Report	Raza (?); Zaid (?)

6 May 2024
14:00 PST

WSTC	1–3	WAPDA
? (?)	Report	Dost (?)

6 May 2024
14:00 PST

Otto Cranes	2–1	Pakistan Police
Muhammad Saad (?); Muhammad Shahzaib (?)	Report	Fateh (?)

=== Group D ===
Pos	Team	Pld	W	D	L	GF	GA	GD	Pts	Qualification
1	SA Gardens	3	2	1	0	8	5	+3	7	Advance to Quarter-finals
2	Pakistan Air Force	3	2	0	1	8	3	+5	6	Advance to Quarter-finals
3	Asia Ghee Mills	3	1	1	1	1	3	−2	4	
4	Pakistan Railways	3	0	0	3	3	9	−6	0	

Updated to match(es) played on 6 May 2024. Source: GSA
2 May 2024
14:00 PST

SA Gardens	5–3	Pakistan Railways
Roger (?); Tauqeer (?); Murtaza (?); Umair (?)	Report	Abdul Rehman (?); Nabeel (?); Masood (?)

2 May 2024
16:30 PST

Pakistan Air Force	3–0	Asia Ghee Mills
Samad Khan Wazir (?); Faisal Baloch (?)	Report

4 May 2024
14:00 PST

Asia Ghee Mills	1–0	Pakistan Railways
Muhammad Suleman Ali (?)	Report

4 May 2024
16:30 PST

Pakistan Air Force	2–3	SA Gardens
Haseeb Khan (?); Faisal (?)	Report	Murtaza Hussain (?); Samnan (?)

6 May 2024
14:00 PST

SA Gardens	0–0	Asia Ghee Mills
	Report

6 May 2024
16:30 PST

Pakistan Air Force	3–0	Pakistan Railways
Mujahid (?); Fahimullah (?)	Report

== Knockout round ==
=== Bracket ===
Quarter-finals
7 May – 15:30
Pakistan Army	1
Pakistan Navy	0
8 may – 15:30
WAPDA	1
Pakistan Air Force	0
7 May – 15:30
Khan Research Laboratories	0
Higher Education Commission	1
8 May – 15:30
SA Gardens	1
WSTC	0

Semi-finals
10 May – 21:00
Pakistan Army	0
WAPDA	2
10 May – 18:00
Higher Education Commission	0 (2)
SA Gardens (p)	0 (3)

Final
12 May – 20:30
WAPDA	1
SA Gardens	0
Third place
12 May – 17:00
Pakistan Army	4
Higher Education Commission	0

=== Quarter-finals ===
7 May 2024
15:30 PST

Khan Research Laboratories	0–1	Higher Education Commission
	Report	Farrukh (?)

7 May 2024
15:30 PST

Pakistan Army	1–0	Pakistan Navy
Qadeer Hussain (?)	Report

8 May 2024
15:30 PST

WAPDA	1–0	Pakistan Air Force
Dost (?)	Report

8 May 2024
15:30 PST

SA Gardens	1–0	WSTC
Umar Sadozai (?)	Report

=== Semi-finals ===
10 May 2024
18:00 PST

SA Gardens	0–0 (a.e.t.)	Higher Education Commission
	Report
Penalties
	3–2

Jinnah Sports Stadium, Islamabad

10 May 2024
21:00 PST

Pakistan Army	0–2	WAPDA
	Report	Faheem 58'; Dost 90'

Jinnah Sports Stadium, Islamabad

=== Third position ===
12 May 2024
17:00 PST

Pakistan Army	4–0	Higher Education Commission

Jinnah Sports Stadium, Islamabad

=== Final ===
12 May 2024
20:30 PST

SA Gardens	0–1	WAPDA
	Report	Yousaf Ahmed 17'

Jinnah Sports Stadium, Islamabad

== Awards ==
As of 12 May 2024

Award	Recipient	Club
Top Scorer	Shayak Dost	WAPDA
Most Valuable Player	Muhammad Umar Hayat	WAPDA
Best Goalkeeper	Salman ul Haq	SA Gardens
Best Referee	Irshad ul Haq	-
Best Assistant Referee	Muhammad Ali	-
Fair play	-	Higher Education Commission
