= 2014 National Challenge Cup =

2014 NBP National Challenge Cup

Tournament details
- Country: Pakistan
- Venue(s): Karachi Port Trust Stadium; KMC Football Stadium, Karachi
- Dates: 25 March 2014 – 5 April 2014
- Teams: 12

Final positions
- Champions: Pakistan Airforce (1st title)
- Runners-up: KESC

Tournament statistics
- Matches played: 19
- Goals scored: 51 (2.68 per match)
- Top goal scorer: Mohammad Mujahid (5 goals)

Awards
- Best player: Abayomi Oludeyi

The 2014 National Challenge Cup was the 24th season of domestic cup tournament in Pakistani football. It was sponsored by National Bank of Pakistan, and known as NBP National Challenge Cup. 12 teams participated in the tournament.

National Bank were the defending champions, but were eliminated in quarter-finals by Karachi Port Trust.

Pakistan Air Force won their first title after defeating KESC 2–1 in the finals.

== Teams ==
The 21 teams participating in the tournament were:

- Khan Research Laboratories (PPL)
- National Bank (TH) (H)
- Habib Bank
- Pakistan Navy
- Karachi Port Trust
- Pakistan Airlines
- Pakistan Airforce
- KESC
- Pakistan Police
- Pak Afghan Clearing
- WAPDA
- Higher Education Commission

Notes
TH = Challenge Cup title holders; PPL = Pakistan Premier League winners; H = Host

== Group stage ==
=== Group A ===
Pos	Team	Pld	W	D	L	GF	GA	GD	Pts	Qualification
1	Pakistan Airlines	2	2	0	0	3	1	+2	6	Advance to Knockout round
2	Khan Research Laboratories	2	0	1	1	1	2	−1	1	Advance to Knockout round
3	Pakistan Navy	2	0	1	1	2	3	−1	1	

Updated to match(es) played on 29 March 2014. Source:
26 March 2014
16:15 PST

Khan Research Laboratories	1–1	Pakistan Navy
Rizwan 63'		Asif Bux 30' (pen.)

Karachi Port Trust Stadium, Karachi
28 March 2014
16:15 PST

Pakistan Navy	1–2	Pakistan Airlines
Asif Bux 76'		Shakir 59'; Haji Mohammad 90+1' (pen.)

Karachi Port Trust Stadium, Karachi
30 March 2014
16:15 PST

Pakistan Airlines	1–0	Khan Research Laboratories
Saadullah 9'

KMC Football Stadium, Karachi

=== Group B ===
Pos	Team	Pld	W	D	L	GF	GA	GD	Pts	Qualification
1	KESC	2	1	1	0	6	3	+3	4	Advance to Knockout round
2	Karachi Port Trust	2	1	1	0	4	3	+1	4	Advance to Knockout round
3	Pak Afghan Clearing	2	0	0	2	4	9	−5	0	

Updated to match(es) played on 29 March 2014. Source:
25 March 2014
16:15 PST

KESC	5–2	Pak Afghan Clearing
Abayomi Oludeyi 10'; Rasool 27', 57'; A. Rehman 61'; U. Farooq 75'		A. Salam 86'; Rehmatullah 89'

KMC Football Stadium, Karachi
27 March 2014
16:15 PST

Pak Afghan Clearing	2–3	Karachi Port Trust
M. Essa Jr. 60'; A. Salam 84'		Waseem 5', 66'; Z. Majeed 81'

Karachi Port Trust Stadium, Karachi
29 March 2014
16:15 PST

Karachi Port Trust	1–1	KESC
U. Farooq 9' (o.g.)		Abayomi Oludeyi 56'

Karachi Port Trust Stadium, Karachi

=== Group C ===
Pos	Team	Pld	W	D	L	GF	GA	GD	Pts	Qualification
1	National Bank	2	1	1	0	4	2	+2	4	Advance to Knockout round
2	WAPDA	2	1	1	0	3	2	+1	4	Advance to Knockout round
3	Higher Education Commission	2	0	0	2	2	5	−3	0	

Updated to match(es) played on 29 March 2014. Source:
25 March 2014
16:15 PST

National Bank	3–1	Higher Education Commission
Sher Ali 14', 37' (pen.); Adnan Mazhar 81'		Noman Khan 76'

Karachi Port Trust Stadium, Karachi
27 March 2014
16:15 PST

WAPDA	2–1	Higher Education Commission
Hassnain 37'; M. Adnaan 57'		Umair Ali 82'

KMC Football Stadium, Karachi
29 March 2014
16:15 PST

National Bank	1–1	WAPDA
Naveed Mumtaz 49'		M. Asif 84'

KMC Football Stadium, Karachi

=== Group D ===
Pos	Team	Pld	W	D	L	GF	GA	GD	Pts	Qualification
1	Habib Bank	2	1	0	1	4	4	0	3	Advance to Knockout round
2	Pakistan Airforce	2	1	0	1	4	4	0	3	Advance to Knockout round
3	Pakistan Police	2	1	0	1	3	3	0	3	

Updated to match(es) played on 29 March 2014. Source:
26 March 2014
16:15 PST

Pakistan Airforce	2–1	Pakistan Police
M. Mujahid 51', 77'		Himmat 85'

KMC Football Stadium, Karachi
28 March 2014
16:15 PST

Pakistan Police	2–1	Habib Bank
Ghulam Nabi 39'; Perveiz 90+2'		Saeed 85'

KMC Football Stadium, Karachi
30 March 2014
16:15 PST

Habib Bank	3–2	Pakistan Airforce
Saeed 62'; Hassan 71'; M. Bilal 73'		Mansoor 12'; M. Mujahid 63'

Karachi Port Trust Stadium, Karachi

== Knockout round ==
=== Quarter-finals ===
31 March 2014
15:30 PST

National Bank	0–1	Karachi Port Trust
		Junaid Qadir 67'

KMC Football Stadium, Karachi
31 March 2014
15:30 PST

KESC	1–0	WAPDA
Riaz 16'

Karachi Port Trust Stadium, Karachi
1 April 2014
15:30 PST

Pakistan Airforce	0–0 (a.e.t.)	Khan Research Laboratories
Penalties
	4-2

KMC Football Stadium, Karachi
1 April 2014
15:30 PST

Habib Bank	1–0	Pakistan Airlines
Saeed 33'

Karachi Port Trust Stadium, Karachi

=== Semifinals ===
2 April 2014
16:00 PST

Pakistan Airforce	4–0	Karachi Port Trust
M. Mujahid 9', 65'; Imran Mushtaq 76'; Ahmed Akber 85'

Karachi Port Trust Stadium, Karachi
2 April 2014
16:00 PST

KESC	1–0	Habib Bank
Abayomi Oludeyi 71'

KMC Football Stadium, Karachi

== Finals ==
5 April 2014
16:00 PST

KESC	1–3 (a.e.t.)	Pakistan Airforce
Abayomi Oludeyi 45+1'	Report	M. Mujahid 71'; M. Arif Nawaz 109'; M. Sheir 116'

Karachi Port Trust Stadium, Karachi
Attendance: 6,002
Referee: M Younis Lal

== Bracket ==
Quarter-finals
31 March – 15:30 PM
National Bank	0
Karachi Port Trust	1
31 March – 15:30 PM
KESC	1
WAPDA F.C.	0
1 April – 4:00 PM
Pakistan Airforce (P)	0 (4)
Khan Research Laboratories	0 (2)
1 April – 4:00 PM
Habib Bank	1
Pakistan Airlines	0

Semi-finals
2 April – 4:00 PM
Pakistan Airforce	4
Karachi Port Trust	0
2 April – 4:00 PM
KESC	1
Habib Bank	0

Final
10 May – 4:00 PM
Pakistan Airforce (a.e.t.)	3
KESC	1

== Statistics ==
=== Top goalscorers ===
Rank	Player	Team	Goals
1	(Pakistan) Mohammad Mujahid	Pakistan Airforce	5
2	(Nigeria) Abayomi Oludeyi	KESC	4
3	(Pakistan) Saeed Ahmed	Habib Bank	3
4	(Pakistan) Muhammad Rasool	KESC	2
4	(Pakistan) Asif Bux	Pakistan Navy	2
4	(Pakistan) Mansoor Khan	Pakistan Airforce	2
4	(Pakistan) Abdus Salam	Pak Afghan Clearing	2
4	(Pakistan) Sher Ali	National Bank	2
