= Shayak Dost =

Pakistani footballer

Personal information
- Date of birth: 1 May 2002 (age 24)
- Place of birth: Killi Jamaldini, Nushki district, Pakistan
- Height: 1.80 m (5 ft 11 in)
- Position: Winger

Team information
- Current team: City Club
- Number: 12

Senior career*
Years	Team	Apps	(Gls)
2018–2019	Baloch Nushki		
2020–	WAPDA		
2020	→ Lyallpur (loan)		
2023–2024	→ Abu Muslim (loan)	3	(1)
2024–2025	→ Adalat Farah (loan)		
2026	→ Brothers Union (loan)	8	(8)
2026–	→ City Club (loan)		

International career^{‡}
2019	Pakistan U20	4	(0)
2023–	Pakistan U23	3	(0)
2022–	Pakistan	23	(2)
- * Club domestic league appearances and goals as of 07:22, 18 April 2026 (UTC) ‡ National team caps and goals as of 2 October 2026

Shayak Dost (Urdu: شہک دوست; born 1 May 2002) is a Pakistani professional footballer who plays for Bangladesh Football League club City Club and the Pakistan national team. Primarily a left winger, Dost can also be deployed as a left midfielder or left wing-back.

== Early life ==
Dost was born to a working-class family in Killi Jamaldini, a small locality near Nushki in Balochistan province and is from the Jamaldini Baloch tribe. He studied from the high school until matriculation, and didn't continue education due to poverty.

== Club career ==
=== Baloch Nushki ===
Dost started his football career with local hometown club Baloch Nushki in 2018.

=== WAPDA ===
In 2020, Dost joined departmental side WAPDA.

==== Loan to Lyallpur ====
In 2020 Dost was a member of Lyallpur. He made one appearance for the club in the 2020 PFF National Challenge Cup, taking part in its 0–1 defeat to Baloch Quetta. In 2021 he also played for local club Balochistan Zorawars in the National Under-23 Football Championship.

==== Loan to Abu Muslim ====
On 20 December 2023, Dost was approached by Afghanistan Champions League club Abu Muslim to sign a one-season deal. On 28 December, he finalised his move to the club.

He returned to WAPDA in May 2024 following the resumption of the 2023–24 PFF National Challenge Cup. He was subsequently awarded as top scorer of the competition.

==== Loan to Adalat Farah ====
On 26 December 2024, Dost along with fellow national teammates Haseeb Khan and Alamgir Ghazi joined Afghanistan Champions League club Adalat Farah in the middle of the season on a loan deal.

==== Loan to Brothers Union ====
In January 2026, Dost joined the Bangladeshi football club Brothers Union for the second round of the Bangladesh Football League. Dost made his debut for the club on March 6, scoring against Bangladesh Police in the 73rd minute.

==== Loan to City Club ====
In July 2026, Dost joined newly promoted Bangladesh Football League side City Club.

== International career ==
Dost represented Pakistan at the youth level in 2020 AFC U-19 Championship qualification. He went on to make four appearances in the campaign.

In August 2022 Dost was called up for a trials with the senior national team. In November the same year, he was included in Pakistan's squad for a friendly against Nepal, Pakistan's first fixture in nearly three-and-a-half years because of the Pakistan Football Federation's suspension by FIFA. He made his senior international debut as a second-half substitute in the eventual 0–1 away defeat.

Dost scored his first international goal on 31 March 2026 against Myanmar during the 2027 AFC Asian Cup qualification at the Jinnah Sports Stadium.

== Style of play ==
Primarily a left winger, Dost can also be deployed as a left midfielder or left wing-back. He provides box-to-box mentality in the wings throughout 90 minutes, running up and down the field, helping the team in transitional play. Apart from his attacking prowess, Dost has been praised due to his abilities winning the ball back and his work-rate.

== Personal life ==
Dost is the youngest of his siblings and in 2005, he was three years old when his father passed away. His older brother Majid Ali also played football, and was selected for the Pakistan national team in 2003 for the 2004 AFC Asian Cup qualification.

== Career statistics ==
=== International ===
As of 2 October 2026

Appearances and goals by national team and year
National team	Year	Apps	Goals
Pakistan	2022	1	0
Pakistan	2023	10	0
Pakistan	2024	3	0
Pakistan	2025	2	0
Pakistan	2026	7	2
Total		23	2

Scores and results list Pakistan's goal tally first, score column indicates score after each Dost goal.

List of international goals scored by Shayak Dost
No.	Date	Venue	Opponent	Score	Result	Competition
1	31 March 2026	Jinnah Sports Stadium, Islamabad, Pakistan	Myanmar	1–2	1–2	2027 AFC Asian Cup qualification
2	10 June 2026	National Football Stadium, Malé, Maldives	Afghanistan	1–0	2–0	2026 Diamond Jubilee International Football Tournament

== Honours ==
WAPDA

- PFF National Challenge Cup: 2023–24, 2026

Pakistan

- Diamond Jubilee International Football Tournament: 2026
