= Saeed Ahmed (footballer) =

Pakistani international footballer

Personal information
- Full name: Saeed Ahmed Nazar Muhammad
- Date of birth: 1 February 1990 (age 36)
- Place of birth: Chaman, Pakistan
- Position: Striker

Senior career*
Years	Team	Apps	(Gls)
2010–2013	Muslim	59	(29)
2013–2014	Khan Research Laboratories	13	(7)
2014–2022	Sui Southern Gas	12	(0)

International career^{‡}
2012	Pakistan U23		
2012–2013	Pakistan	7	(0)
- * Club domestic league appearances and goals as of January 13, 2019 ‡ National team caps and goals as of September 18, 2018

Saeed Ahmed Nazar Muhammad (born 1 February 1990) is a Pakistani footballer who plays as a striker.

== Club career ==
=== Muslim ===
Ahmed started his career with Muslim FC. He helped the side achieve promotion to the Pakistan Premier League during the 2010–11 Pakistan Football Federation League, scoring 4 goals in 5 appearances. He received the best player award in the 2012–13 Pakistan Premier League season.

=== Khan Research Laboratories ===
Ahmed moved to departmental side Khan Research Laboratories in 2013. He won the 2013–14 Pakistan Premier League.

=== Sui Southern Gas ===
The next season, Ahmed signed for SSGC. In 2021, SSGC club was closed after the shutdown of departmental sports in Pakistan. After the restoration of departmental sports in Pakistan, SSGC terminated contracts of the players of the squad on 26 August 2022, including Ahmed.

== International career ==
Ahmed was called up to the Pakistan under 23 team in the 2012 H.E. Mahinda Rajapaksa Under-23 International Football Trophy. He scored against Bangladesh in the group stages. Ahmed missed the penalty in the final against Maldives, with Pakistan ultimately finishing as runner-up of the tournament.

He played his first senior international match in 2012 in the defeat against Singapore.

== Career statistics ==
=== Club ===
As of match played 29 May 2019

Appearances and goals by club, season and competition
Club	Season	League			National Cup		Asia		Total	
Club	Season	Division	Apps	Goals	Apps	Goals	Apps	Goals	Apps	Goals
Muslim	2010–11	Football Federation League	5	4	–		–		5	4
Muslim	2011–12	Pakistan Premier League	26	15	–		–		26	15
Muslim	2012–13	Pakistan Premier League	28	10	–		–		28	10
Muslim	Total		59	29	–		–		59	29
Khan Research Laboratories	2013–14	Pakistan Premier League	13	7	4	2	2 (Note: Appearances in AFC President's Cup)	0	19	9
Khan Research Laboratories	Total		13	7	4	2	2	0	19	9
Sui Southern Gas	2014–15	Football Federation League	5	0	3	1	–		8	1
Sui Southern Gas	2018–19	Pakistan Premier League	7	0	2	0	–		9	0
Sui Southern Gas	Total		12	0	5	1	–		13	1
Career totals			84	36	9	3	2	0	95	39

=== International ===
Appearances and goals by national team and year
National team	Year	Apps	Goals
Pakistan	2012	1	0
Pakistan	2013	6	0
Total		7	0

== Honours ==
=== Khan Research Laboratories ===
- Pakistan Premier League: 2013–14

=== Individual ===
- Best player: 2012–13 Pakistan Premier League
