= 2014–15 in Pakistani football =

Football in Pakistan
- Season: 2014–15

Men's football
- Pakistan Premier League: K-Electric
- Football Federation League: Pakistan Navy
- National Challenge Cup: Khan Research Laboratories

The 2014–15 season is the 66th season of competitive football in Pakistan.

== Changes in the Premier League ==
Teams promoted to the 2014–15 Pakistan Premier League:

- Pakistan Railways

Teams relegated from the 2014–15 Pakistan Premier League:

- Habib Bank
- Lyallpur
- Navy
- Pak Afghan Clearing
- Zarai Taraqiati

Name changes:

- Karachi Electric Supply Corporation F.C. → K-Electric F.C.

== Internationals ==
=== Men ===
==== International Friendlies ====
14 October 2014	Pakistan	0–2	Palestine	Lahore
16:00 PST			Ismail 90'; Jaber 90+3'	Stadium: Punjab Stadium

6 February 2015	Pakistan	2–1	Afghanistan	Lahore
16:00 PST	M. Riaz 18'; Saadullah 90+1'		Sharifi 56'	Stadium: Punjab Stadium

==== 2018 FIFA World Cup qualifier ====
12 March 2015	Yemen	3–1	Pakistan	Grand Hamad Stadium, Doha (Qatar) (Note: Yemen played their home match in Doha, Qatar due to security concerns from the 2014–15 Yemeni coup d'état.)
18:30 UTC+3	Al-Matari 3'; Boqshan 56'; Al-Sasi 69'	Report (FIFA); Report (AFC)	Bashir 67' (pen.)	Attendance: 300; Referee: Mohammad Abu Loum (Jordan)

23 March 2015 (Note: Pakistan was originally scheduled to play their home match on 17 March 2015 (15:00 UTC+5) at Punjab Stadium, Lahore, but it was postponed due to safety and security reasons after the Lahore church bombings and civil unrest in the city. The match was subsequently rescheduled to be played in Bahrain.)	Pakistan	0–0	Yemen	Khalifa Sports City Stadium, Isa Town (Bahrain)
18:30 UTC+3		Report (FIFA); Report (AFC)		Attendance: 2,200; Referee: Ali Sabah Adday Al-Qaysi (Iraq)

== Club competitions ==
=== Pakistan Premier League ===
Pos	Team	Pld	W	D	L	GF	GA	GD	Pts	Qualification or relegation
1	K-Electric (C)	22	15	3	4	43	20	+23	48	Qualification to AFC Cup qualifying round
2	Pakistan Army	22	13	6	3	30	7	+23	45	
3	Pakistan Air Force	22	12	6	4	38	14	+24	42	
4	Pakistan Airlines	22	11	5	6	28	18	+10	38	
5	WAPDA	22	10	6	6	31	14	+17	36	
6	Khan Research Laboratories	22	8	7	7	19	16	+3	31	
7	National Bank	22	8	6	8	21	17	+4	30	
8	Karachi Port Trust	22	9	2	11	29	28	+1	29	
9	Muslim	22	8	5	9	26	26	0	29	
10	Afghan Chaman	22	6	5	11	24	29	−5	23	
11	Pakistan Railways (R)	22	1	7	14	13	25	−12	10	Relegation
12	Baloch Quetta (R)	22	0	4	18	6	64	−58	4	Relegation

Source: SoccerWay
(C) Champions; (R) Relegated

=== Pakistan Football Federation League ===
==== Play-off finals ====
27 December 2014
15:00 UTC+05:00

Navy	1–0	Baloch Nushki
	Report

Dr. Mohammad Ali Shah, Karachi
