= Salman ul Haq =

Pakistani footballer

Personal information
- Full name: Salman ul Haq
- Date of birth: 10 June 2001 (age 25)
- Place of birth: Faisalabad, Pakistan
- Position: Goalkeeper

Team information
- Current team: SA Gardens

Senior career*
Years	Team	Apps	(Gls)
2018–2019	Pakistan Air Force		
2020–2022	Sui Northern Gas	6	(0)
2022–	SA Gardens		

International career^{‡}
2020	Pakistan U20	3	(0)
2023	Pakistan U23	2	(0)
- * Club domestic league appearances and goals as of 03:47, 16 January 2024 (UTC) ‡ National team caps and goals as of 23:00, 16 January 2024 (UTC)

Salman ul Haq (born 10 June 2001) is a Pakistani professional footballer who plays as a goalkeeper for SA Gardens.

== Club career ==
=== Early career ===
In 2018, Salman was a member of Pakistan Air Force departmental team. In 2020, he joined SNGPL of the Pakistan Premier League. He made 6 appearances in the 2021–22 season until the league was cancelled shortly after starting.

=== SA Gardens ===
By 2022 Salman signed for SA Gardens. His strings of saves of the penalties in the semifinals of the 2023–24 PFF National Challenge Cup against Higher Education Commission departmental team helped SA Gardens into the final where they ended being the runner-up, losing against WAPDA in the final. He was declared the best goalkeeper of the competition.

== International career ==
Salman represented Pakistan at the youth level in 2020 AFC U-19 Championship qualification. He went on to make three appearances in the campaign.

In May 2023, Salman was called up for trials with the senior national team. In June next month, he was included in Pakistan's squad for the 2023 SAFF Championship. He was called in September 2023 for the 2024 AFC U-23 Asian Cup qualification where he made two appearances against Japan and Bahrain, as Pakistan exited the group losing three games in the group.
