= SA Gardens FC =

Pakistani football club

SA Gardens
- Full name: SA Gardens Football Club
- Short name: SAG
- Founded: 2020; 6 years ago
- Ground: SA Gardens Football Ground
- Technical Director: Saud Yousaf
- Head Coach: Zafar Iqbal

SA Gardens Football Club is a Pakistani professional football club based in Kala Shah Kaku, Punjab. The club has featured thrice in the National Challenge Cup.

The club also has a futsal section.

== History ==
The club was founded in 2020. Shortly after, it made its debut in national competition. In the 2020 National Football Challenge Cup. They were drawn in group F with SSGC, Wohaib and Masha United. The club started the campaign with a 1–1 draw against Wohaib. The club advanced until the semifinals before falling to WAPDA by 3–0.

The club finished as runner-up of the 2023–24 National Football Challenge Cup, after falling against WAPDA by 0–1 in the final.

In February 2026, the Pakistan Football Federation (PFF) announced the 2026 National Challenge Cup. SA Gardens was drawn into Group D, alongside NIMSO and Pak Afghan Clearing Agency. In the opening game, SA Gardens drew with PACA, via a 93rd minute equalizer from the captain Umer Javed. In the second group game, the club defeated NIMSO, with Shahzaib scoring in the 53rd minute.

In the Quarter-finals, they were drawn against International Supply Company. SA Gardens won on 4-2 on penalties, after ending 1-1 at the end of normal time. Umer Javed scored his second goal of the tournament. In the Semi-finals, the 2024 edition winners, WAPDA, faced off SA Gardens in a repeat of the 2024 final. The match remained one-sided, as WAPDA eased pass 4-0.

In the Third-place playoff, the team took on Pakistan Army, which ended in a 2-2 draw, forcing a penalty shootout. SA Gardens took home third place, winning 4-2 on penalties.

The tournament saw Umer Javed score twice. While, Fahad, Ubah and Shahzaib scored one time each.

== Results and fixtures ==
The following is a list of match results in the last 12 months, as well as any future match have been scheduled.

Win Draw Loss Fixture

=== 2026 ===
| 4 February 2026 2026 National Challenge Cup - Group Stage | SA Gardens | 1–1 | PACA | Karachi, Pakistan |
| | Umar Javed 90+3' | | Sharaf Khan 45+7' | Stadium: KMC Stadium |

| 8 February 2026 2026 National Challenge Cup - Group Stage | SA Gardens | 1–0 | NIMSO | Karachi, Pakistan |
| | Shahzaib 53' | | | Stadium: KMC Stadium |

| 11 February 2026 2026 National Challenge Cup - Quarter-finals | SA Gardens | 1–1 (a.e.t.) (4-2 p) | International Supply Company | Karachi, Pakistan |
| | Umer Javed 35' (pen.) | | Salman Umer 73' | Stadium: KPT Stadium |
| | Penalties |
| | Mohib Afridi (penalty scored); Umer Javed (penalty scored) | | (penalty missed) Salman Umer; (penalty missed) Anas Nazeer; (penalty scored) Akhter; (penalty scored) Hussain Latif |

| 13 February 2026 2026 National Challenge Cup - Semi-finals | SA Gardens | 0–4 | WAPDA | Karachi, Pakistan |
| | | | Raza 31', 53' (pen.); Mohib Ullah 36' (o.g.); Hammad Hassan 90' | Stadium: KPT Stadium |

| 15 February 2026 2026 National Challenge Cup - Third place playoff | SA Gardens | 2-2 (a.e.t.) (4-2 p) | Army | Karachi, Pakistan |
| | Fahad 13'; Ubah 37' | | Abrar Ahmed 11'; Qadeer 21' | Stadium: KPT Stadium |
| | Penalties |
| | Jevan Khan (penalty scored); Ubaid ur Rahman (penalty scored); Toqeer ul Hassan (penalty missed); Ans Amin (penalty scored); Umer Javed (penalty scored) | | (penalty scored) Afzaal; (penalty scored) Umair; (penalty missed) Rehman Manzoor; (penalty missed) Rafay |

== Players (2023) ==
Note: Flags indicate national team as defined under FIFA eligibility rules; some limited exceptions apply. Players may hold more than one non-FIFA nationality.

| No. | Pos. | Nation | Player |
|---|---|---|---|
| — | FW | PAK | Muhammed Rafay |
| — | GK | PAK | Muhammad Azhar |
| — | GK | PAK | Abdul Basit |
| — | DF | PAK | Bakht Ali |
| — | DF | PAK | Hamza Munir |
| — | DF | PAK | Kamran Yaseen |
| — | DF | PAK | Umer Javed Sadozai |
| — | DF | PAK | Kamran Ali |
| — | DF | PAK | Hamza Nawaz |
| — | DF | PAK | Aamir Sohail |
| — | MF | PAK | Umer Saeed |
| — | MF | PAK | Naik Alam |
| — | MF | PAK | Toqeer Ul Hassan |

| No. | Pos. | Nation | Player |
|---|---|---|---|
| — | MF | PAK | Zaid Mehmood |
| — | MF | NGA | Ogwuike Okechukwu Bennedict Ubah |
| — | MF | PAK | Muhammad Fahad |
| — | MF | PAK | Shahzaib Hassan |
| — | MF | PAK | Saud Yousaf |
| — | MF | PAK | Faran Nasir |
| — | FW | PAK | Rawal Mahfooz |
| — | FW | PAK | Haider Ali |
| — | FW | PAK | Saif Ali |
| — | FW | PAK | Muhammad Mustafa |
| — | FW | PAK | Zohair Altaf Gondal |
| — | FW | PAK | Daniel Azeem |
| — | FW | PAK | Abdullah Malik |
| — | FW | PAK | Essa Bahader |

== Staff (2026) ==
| Position | Name |
|---|---|
| Head coach | (Pakistan) Zafar Iqbal |
| Team manager | (Pakistan) Saud Yousaf |
| Assistant Coach | (Pakistan) Mohammad Hamza |
| Physio | (Pakistan) Majid |

== Honours ==
=== Domestic ===
- National Football Challenge Cup:
  - Runners up (1): 2023-24
  - 3rd Place (1): 2026

=== Futsal ===
- PFF National Futsal Cup:
  - Winners (1): 2023
