= Muhammad Umar Hayat =

Pakistani footballer

Personal information
- Full name: Muhammad Umar Hayat
- Date of birth: 22 September 1996 (age 30)
- Place of birth: Okara, Pakistan
- Height: 1.70 m (5 ft 7 in)
- Position: Right-back

Team information
- Current team: WAPDA

Youth career
- Renala Sports

Senior career*
Years	Team	Apps	(Gls)
2012–	WAPDA		
2014	→ Lyallpur (loan)		
2026	→ Brothers Union (loan)		

International career^{‡}
2018	Pakistan U23	3	(0)
2018–	Pakistan	22	(1)
- * Club domestic league appearances and goals as of 3 July 2021 (UTC) ‡ National team caps and goals as of 9 October 2025 (UTC)

Muhammad Umar Hayat (born 22 September 1996), also known as Umar Rao, is a Pakistani professional footballer who plays as a right-back for WAPDA, and the Pakistan national team.

== Club career ==
Hayat started his early career with Renala Sports Football Club located in District Okara, and later joined departmental side WAPDA in 2012. He had a brief stint with Lyallpur at the 2014 PFF League.

Hayat captained WAPDA, winning the 2023–24 PFF National Challenge Cup, where he was declared the most valuable player of the competition.

In January 2026, Hayat joined the Bangladeshi football club Brothers Union for the second round of the Bangladesh Football League.

== International career ==
Hayat went on an under-14 AFC Championship tour in Iran with the Pakistan youth team.

Hayat was included in the Pakistan under 23 squad for the 2018 Asian Games held in Jakarta. He went on to make three appearances in the campaign.

He was subsequently named to the nation's 20-man squad for the 2018 SAFF Championship. He made his senior international debut on 4 September 2018 in the team's opening match of the tournament, a 2–1 victory over Nepal. The following year he was then named to Pakistan's squad for 2022 FIFA World Cup qualification matches against Cambodia, earning praise from local media for his performance at right-back.

Hayat scored his first international goal on 17 October 2023 against Djibouti during the 2023 Mauritius Four Nations Cup. He represented the Pakistan national football team in the 2026 FIFA World Cup qualifiers, making history as Pakistan defeated the Cambodia national football team in the second leg after drawing the first—qualifying for the 2nd round Of Fifa Worldcup for the very first time.

== Career statistics ==
=== International ===
As of 9 October 2025

Appearances and goals by national team and year
National team	Year	Apps	Goals
Pakistan	2018	3	0
Pakistan	2019	2	0
Pakistan	2022	1	0
Pakistan	2023	9	1
Pakistan	2024	4	0
Pakistan	2025	3	0
Total		22	1

Scores and results list Pakistan's goal tally first, score column indicates score after each Hayat goal.

List of international goals scored by Muhammad Umar Hayat
No.	Date	Venue	Opponent	Score	Result	Competition
1	17 June 2023	Stade de Cote d'Or, Saint Pierre, Mauritius	Djibouti	1–2	1–3	2023 Mauritius Four Nations Cup

== Honours ==
=== WAPDA ===
- PFF National Challenge Cup: 2020, 2023–24
