= Pakistan Civil Aviation Authority FC =

Pakistani football club

Pakistan Civil Aviation Authority
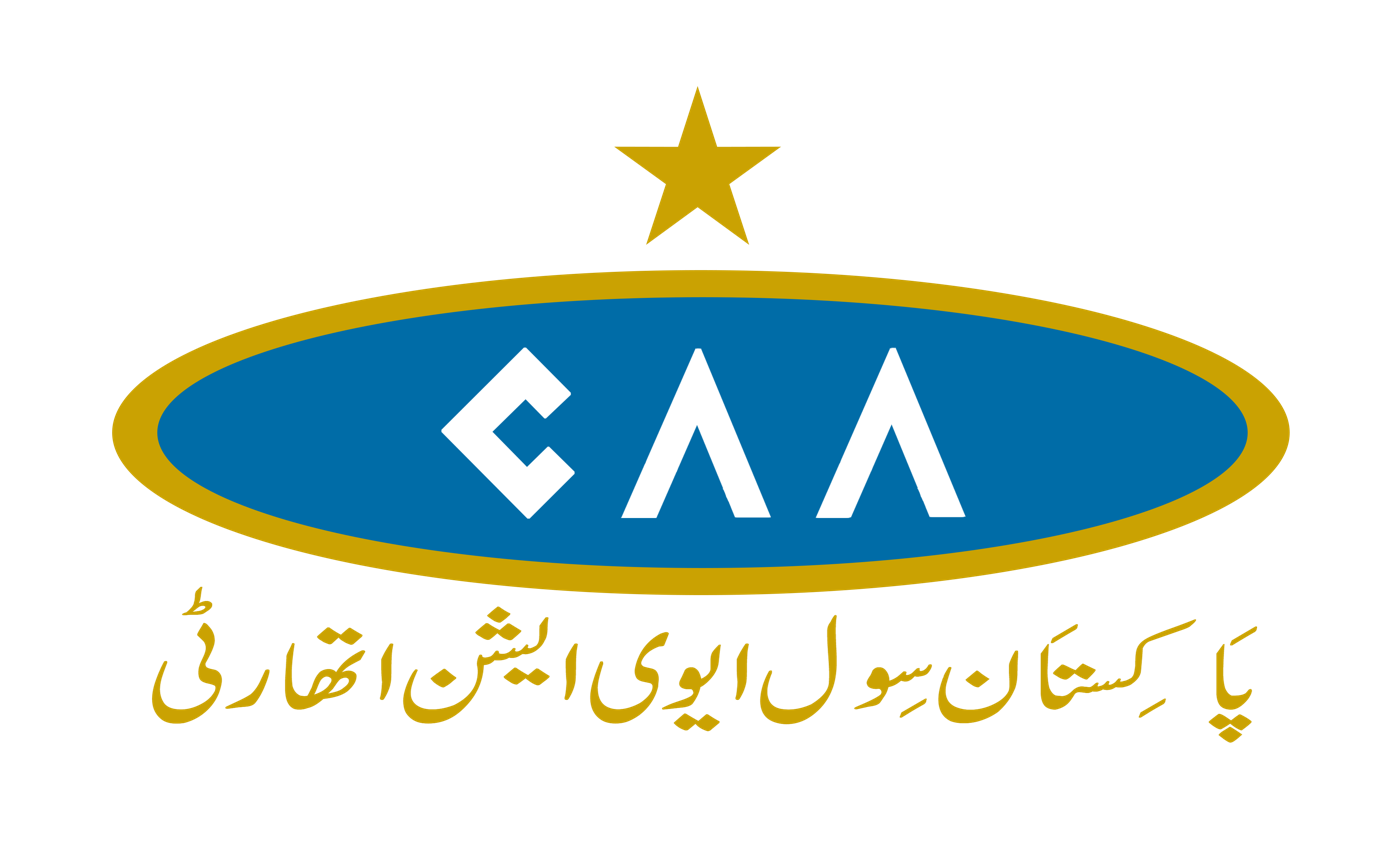
- Full name: Pakistan Civil Aviation Authority Football Club
- Short name: PCAA
- Founded: 2017; 9 years ago
- Dissolved: 2021; 5 years ago
- Ground: Korangi Baloch Stadium
- Capacity: 5,000
- Owner: Pakistan Civil Aviation Authority
Home colours	Away colours

Pakistan Civil Aviation Authority Football Club, commonly referred to as PCAA or CAA, served as the football section of Pakistan Civil Aviation Authority. Based in Karachi, the club used to compete in the Pakistan Premier League.

== History ==
=== Formation ===
CAA FC was formed in 2017, before the start of 2018 National Challenge Cup, along with Pakistan Petroleum and Asia Ghee Mills. All the clubs were formed to take part in the first-ever football tournament in Pakistan since 2016 PFF Cup.

=== National Football Challenge Cup ===
The CAA F.C. Aviation Authority played their first game on 28 April 2018 against Sindh Government Press in the opening match at All Brothers Football Stadium, Karachi. The CAA team won 3–1. On 2 May 2018, the CAA caused a major upset after defeating the defending and six-time champions, Khan Research Laboratories 1–0 in the final match of the group stage, with an 86th-minute goal from winger Zaid Umer. In the quarter-finals, the CAA defeated the newly formed Asia Ghee Mills 2–1. They faced eventual winners Pakistan Air Force in the semi-finals. After getting the lead in the 44th minute through Saeed A. Aziz, the CAA conceded a goal in the 77th minute. The match went on to penalties after ending 1–1 in the extra time, and Pakistan Air Force won 4–3. The CAA faced newly formed Pakistan Petroleum in the third-place match, which they lost 5–1.

=== Pakistan Premier League ===
Aviation Authority won promotion after winning the play-off against Asia Ghee Mills. On 28 September 2018, Aviation Authority played their first top-flight match against newly promoted Sui Southern Gas, a 0–0 draw. Aviation Authority's first loss of the season was against National Bank in the second match day on 1 October 2018. On 27 October 2018, Aviation Authority did a major upset in the league, after drawing 2–2 with WAPDA away at Punjab Stadium. Their first victory came in the match day 10, on 4 November 2018, defeating Afghan Chaman 2–0. On 13 December 2018, Aviation Authority recorded their biggest victory after defeating relegation bound Baloch Nushki 6–1, with full-back Muhammad Naeem scoring five goals. On 20 December, Aviation Authority did a major upset by defeating WAPDA 2–0. Three days later, they defeated first placed Pakistan Airforce. On 30 December, they defeated Karachi Port Trust 5–2 away, the victory which confirmed the relegation of Karachi Port Trust for the first time in the Pakistan Premier League history. Their last match of the season was a 1–0 win over former champions Pakistan Army.

=== Disbandment ===
The club was closed after the shutdown of departmental sports in Pakistan in September 2021.

== Statistics ==
=== Season-by-season ===
As of match played 13 January 2019

Season	League								National Cup	Top Scorer	
Season	P	W	D	L	GF	GA	Pts	Position	National Cup	Player	Goals
2018–19	26	11	6	9	31	27	39	7th	Semi-finals	(Pakistan) Muhammad Naeem	14
2019–20	–	–	–	–	–	–	–	–	Quarter-finals	(Pakistan) Muhammad Waheed	7
