= Mansoor Khan (footballer) =

Pakistani footballer (born 1997)

Personal information
- Full name: Mansoor Khan
- Date of birth: 20 February 1997 (age 29)
- Place of birth: Mardan, Pakistan
- Position: Midfielder

Team information
- Current team: Khan Research Laboratories
- Number: 17

Youth career
- Mardan Blue Star

Senior career*
Years	Team	Apps	(Gls)
2009–2011	Mardan Blue Star	2	(0)
2011–2024	Pakistan Air Force	47	(23)
2024–	Khan Research Laboratories		

International career^{‡}
2011	Pakistan U16	4	(3)
2014–2018	Pakistan U23	5	(1)
2014–2018	Pakistan	6	(0)
- * Club domestic league appearances and goals ‡ National team caps and goals as of 18:59, 20 February 2017 (UTC)

Mansoor Khan (Urdu, Pashto: منصور خان; born 20 February 1997) is a Pakistani footballer who plays as a midfielder for Khan Research Laboratories. He has also represented Pakistan internationally at the senior, U23 and U16 levels.

Khan was declared player of the tournament in the 2011 SAFF U-16 Championship after winning the title with Pakistan. He has won the National Challenge Cup twice with Pakistan Air Force, in 2014 and 2018.

== Early life and career ==
Mansoor was born in Mardan, Khyber Pakhtunkhwa. He started his career with hometown team Mardan Blue Star.

== Club career ==
=== Pakistan Airforce ===
==== Debut season: 2011–2014 ====
Mansoor joined departmental side Pakistan Air Force in 2011. He made just 7 appearances in the 2011–12 Pakistan Premier League. His only goal of the season was a winner against Pakistan Airlines in the 77th minute in a 2–1 victory. In the 2012–13 season, Mansoor made 13 appearances providing four assists. In the 2013–14 season, he was barely used in the league although he competed in all of the 2014 National Football Challenge Cup matches for the team, scoring in a 3–2 group stage defeat to Habib Bank and netting the winner, in the 76th minute, against Karachi Electric Supply Corporation in the finals.

==== 2014–2024 ====
Mansoor scored his first goal of the 2014–15 season against Karachi Port Trust in a 3–2 defeat. Mansoor ended his season with 18 goals in 22 appearances, finishing second to K-Electric's Muhammad Rasool for the golden boot, Mansoor khan won player of the year award that season.

On 13 October 2016, Mansoor scored his first hat-trick against Punjab in All Pakistan Shama Challenge Football Cup, scoring the goals in 7th, 17th and 56th minute as Pakistan Airforce won the match 5–0. Mansoor scored the winner against Khan Research Laboratories in quarter-finals on 53rd minute.

In December 2016, Khan was approached by Sri Lanka Premier League club Air Force SC along with three more players and the coach of his club during their tour to Colombo. However, the move failed to materialise due to Pakistan Football Federation failure to provide PAF with the International Transfer Certificate in time.

After three years of inactivity due to Pakistan Football Federation suspension by FIFA, Khan participated 2023–24 PFF National Challenge Cup.

=== Khan Research Laboratories ===
In June 2024, Mansoor Khan moved to departmental side Khan Research Laboratories.

== International career ==
Khan represented Pakistan at the youth level at the inaugural SAFF U-16 Championship held in Kathmandu, Nepal in 2011. His was the only goal in Pakistan's first match of the tournament as Pakistan defeated India 1–0, before winning 6–0 versus Maldives to reach the semi-finals. He scored the last of two late goals against Bangladesh, helping his team qualify for the final, In the final, Khan again scored against India as Pakistan became the champions via a 2–1 win. Khan was declared the tournament's best player.

He received his first senior cap with Pakistan in a friendly against Lebanon which ended in a 2–1 loss. He was also called by the under 23 team to represent in the 2016 AFC U-23 Championship qualification and the 2018 Asian Games. He scored a free kick goal in a 3–1 victory against Kyrgyzstan in the AFC qualifiers.

== Career statistics ==
=== International ===
Appearances and goals by year and competition
National team	Year	Apps	Goals
Pakistan	2014	3	0
Pakistan	2015	2	0
Pakistan	2018	1	0
Total		6	0
