= 2026 National Challenge Cup =

National Challenge Cup

Tournament details
- Country: Pakistan
- Dates: 4–15 February
- Teams: 12

Final positions
- Champions: WAPDA
- Runners-up: Khan Research Laboratories
- Third place: SA Gardens
- Fourth place: Pakistan Army

Tournament statistics
- Top goal scorer: Syed Ali Raza (6 goals)

Awards
- Best player: Waqar Baloch
- Best goalkeeper: Hassan Ali
- All statistics correct as of 15 February 2026.

The 2026 National Challenge Cup was the 31st edition of domestic football cup competition in Pakistan. 12 departmental teams participate in the competition, from 4 until 15 February. WAPDA successfully defended the title after defeating Khan Research Laboratories in the final.

== Background ==
After a long lasting football inactivity and the election of new Pakistan Football Federation president Mohsen Gilani, the tournament was expected to start between 15 and 30 October 2025, until being delayed. The tournament took place at two venues in Karachi, KMC Stadium and KPT Sports Complex.

== Format ==
Teams were divided into four pools, with the top two from each advancing to the quarter-finals.

== Teams ==
The 12 teams participating in the tournament were as below. Pakistan Police and Gwadar Port Authority withdrew after initially confirming participation.

- Khan Research Laboratories
- WAPDA
- Pakistan Air Force
- Pakistan Navy
- Pakistan Army
- Hazara Coal Company
- NIMSO
- Pak Afghan Clearing Agency
- SA Gardens
- Mamsons
- Pakistan Railways
- International Supply Company

== Group stage ==
=== Group A ===
Pos	Team	Pld	W	D	L	GF	GA	GD	Pts	Qualification
1	Mamsons	2	1	1	0	2	1	+1	4	Advance to Knockout round
2	Pakistan Air Force	2	1	0	1	2	2	0	3	Advance to Knockout round
3	Pakistan Navy	2	0	1	1	0	1	−1	1	

Source: PFF
4 February 2026

Pakistan Navy	0–1	Pakistan Air Force
	Report	Arsalan 90+2'

KPT Stadium, Karachi

6 February 2026

Pakistan Air Force	1–2	Mamsons
Samad Khan 18'	Report	Hayyaan Khattak 45+2', 77'

KMC Stadium, Karachi

8 February 2026

Mamsons	0–0	Pakistan Navy
	Report

KPT Stadium, Karachi

=== Group B ===
Pos	Team	Pld	W	D	L	GF	GA	GD	Pts	Qualification
1	WAPDA	2	1	1	0	5	0	+5	4	Advance to Knockout round
2	Khan Research Laboratories	2	1	1	0	3	0	+3	4	Advance to Knockout round
3	Hazara Coal	2	0	0	2	0	8	−8	0	

Source: PFF
4 February 2026

WAPDA	0–0	Khan Research Laboratories
	Report

KMC Stadium, Karachi

6 February 2026

Khan Research Laboratories	3–0	Hazara Coal
Mohammad Adil 30'; Moin Ahmed 40'; Waqar Baloch 48'	Report

KPT Stadium, Karachi

8 February 2026

Hazara Coal	0–5	WAPDA
	Report	Raza 4', 6', 53'; Adil 45+2'; Ahmed Faheem 48'

KMC Stadium, Karachi

=== Group C ===
Pos	Team	Pld	W	D	L	GF	GA	GD	Pts	Qualification
1	Pakistan Army	2	1	1	0	3	1	+2	4	Advance to Knockout round
2	International Supply Company	2	1	0	1	1	2	−1	3	Advance to Knockout round
3	Pakistan Railways	2	0	1	1	1	2	−1	1	

Source: PFF
4 February 2026

Pakistan Army	1–1	Pakistan Railways
Rafay 58'	Report	Mohammad Suleman 88'

KPT Stadium, Karachi

6 February 2026

Pakistan Railways	0–1	International Supply Company
	Report	Ubaid 85'

KMC Stadium, Karachi

8 February 2026

International Supply Company	0–2	Pakistan Army
	Report	Rafay 13'; Subhan Karim 61'

KPT Stadium, Karachi

=== Group D ===
Pos	Team	Pld	W	D	L	GF	GA	GD	Pts	Qualification
1	SA Gardens	2	1	1	0	2	1	+1	4	Advance to Knockout round
2	NIMSO	2	1	0	1	2	1	+1	3	Advance to Knockout round
3	Pak Afghan Clearing Agency	2	0	1	1	1	3	−2	1	

Source: PFF
4 February 2026

SA Gardens	1–1	Pak Afghan Clearing Agency
Umar Javed 90+3'	Report	Sharef Khan 45+7'

KMC Stadium, Karachi

6 February 2026

Pak Afghan Clearing Agency	0–2	NIMSO
	Report	Zulfiqar 17'; Altaf 22'

KPT Stadium, Karachi

8 February 2026

NIMSO	0–1	SA Gardens
	Report	Shahzaib 53'

KMC Stadium, Karachi

== Knockout round ==
=== Quarter-finals ===
10 February 2026

Mamsons	0–2	Khan Research Laboratories
	Report	Najeeb 41'; Moin Ahmed 79'

KPT Stadium, Karachi

10 February 2026

WAPDA	3–0	Pakistan Air Force
Mohammad Abdullah 5'; Adnan Saeed 23'; Raza 45+4'	Report

KPT Stadium, Karachi

11 February 2026

Pakistan Army	4–0	NIMSO
Rafay 13', 26'; Mansoor 24'; Noor Saba 85'	Report

KPT Stadium, Karachi

11 February 2026

SA Gardens	1–1	International Supply Company
Umar Javed 35' (pen.)	Report	Salman Umer 73'
Penalties
	4–2

KPT Stadium, Karachi

=== Semi-finals ===
13 February 2026

Khan Research Laboratories	4–0	Pakistan Army
Ali Zafar 26'; Zaid Umer 47'; Ali Agha 70'; Sameer Abbas 83'	Report

KPT Stadium, Karachi

13 February 2026

WAPDA	4–0	SA Gardens
Raza 31', 53' (pen.); Mohib Ullah 36' (o.g.); Hammad Hassan 90'	Report

KPT Stadium, Karachi

=== Third position ===
15 February 2026

Pakistan Army	2–2	SA Gardens
Abrar Ahmed 11'; Qadeer 21'	Report	Fahad 13'; Ubah 37'
Penalties
	2–4

KPT Stadium, Karachi

=== Final ===
15 February 2026

Khan Research Laboratories	0–1	WAPDA
	Report	Sumnan Qaiser 86'

KPT Stadium, Karachi

== Awards ==
Award	Recipient	Club
Top Scorer	Syed Ali Raza	WAPDA
Most Valuable Player	Waqar Baloch	Khan Research Laboratories
Best Goalkeeper	Hassan Ali	WAPDA
Best Referee	Adnan Anjum; Dilawar Khan	-
Best Assistant Referee	Ehsan Ahmed	-
Fair play	-	International Supply Company
