= Muhammad Waseem Khan =

Pakistani footballer

Personal information
- Full name: Muhammad Waseem Khan
- Date of birth: 20 August 1987 (age 39)
- Place of birth: Karachi, Pakistan
- Position: Midfielder

Youth career
- Lyari Star FC

Senior career*
Years	Team	Apps	(Gls)
2007–2008	Pakistan Public Works Department		
2008–2021	Karachi Port Trust		

International career
2006	Pakistan	3	(0)
- * Club domestic league appearances and goals

Muhammad Waseem Khan (Urdu: محمد وسیم خان; born 20 August 1987), also known as Waseem Cheena, is a Pakistani former footballer who played as a midfielder. Waseem has represented the Pakistan national football team in 2006.

== Early life ==
Waseem was born 20 August 1987 in Lyari, Karachi.

== Club career ==
In 2007, Waseem was representing Lyari Star Football Club in the Anti-Narcotics Football Tournament at the KMC Stadium in Karachi. He was then scouted by KMC manager Ahmed Jan. In the same year, he got a permanent job in Pakistan Public Works Department, and represented the institution's football team in the second tier 2007 PFF League.

Waseem later joined Karachi Port Trust.

== International career ==
Waseem made his international debut with Pakistan at the 2007 AFC Asian Cup qualification. He also played several international matches at youth level.

== Honours ==
=== Karachi Port Trust ===
- KPT-PFF Cup
  - Winners (1): 2010
