= Syed Ali Raza (footballer) =

Pakistani footballer

Personal information
- Full name: Syed Ali Raza
- Date of birth: 6 August 2004 (age 22)
- Place of birth: Quetta, Pakistan
- Position: Forward

Team information
- Current team: Brothers Union
- Number: 11

Senior career*
Years	Team	Apps	(Gls)
2020–2024	NIMSO		
2026–	WAPDA		
2026–	→ Brothers Union (loan)		

International career^{‡}
2025–	Pakistan U23	3	(0)
2026–	Pakistan	3	(0)
- * Club domestic league appearances and goals as of 23:00, 31 March 2026 (UTC) ‡ National team caps and goals as of 23:00, 2 October 2026 (UTC)

Syed Ali Raza (born 6 August 2004) is a Pakistani footballer who plays as a forward for Bangladesh Football League club Brothers Union and the Pakistan national team.

== Club career ==
=== NIMSO ===
Raza represented Quetta based departmental side NIMSO at the 2020 and 2023–24 National Challenge Cup. In 2024, he was scouted by Dubai based youth team named The Football Academy (TFA). He was praised in his debut match with the team.

=== WAPDA ===
In 2026, Raza was acquired by WAPDA for the 2026 National Challenge Cup. He went on to win the title with the team, and finished as top scorer of the tournament with six goals.

==== Loan to Brothers Union ====
In August 2026, he was loaned to Brothers Union for the 2026–27 Bangladesh Football League.

== International career ==
Raza made his international debut with Pakistan U23 at the 2026 AFC U-23 Asian Cup qualification.

In 2026, he was selected for the Pakistan senior team for the 2027 AFC Asian Cup qualification. He made his debut against Myanmar on 31 March 2026.

== Personal life ==
Raza's father Zahir Agha was also a football player. He supports FC Barcelona and has cited Lionel Messi as his favourite player.

== Career statistics ==
=== International ===
As of 2 October 2026

Appearances and goals by national team and year
National team	Year	Apps	Goals
Pakistan	2026	3	0
Total		3	0

== Honours ==
WAPDA

- National Challenge Cup: 2026
