= 2018–19 Pakistan Premier League =

Pakistan Premier League
- Season: 2018–19
- Dates: 25 September 2018 – 13 January 2019
- Champions: Khan Research Laboratories; 5th Premier League; 5th Pakistani title
- Relegated: Karachi Port Trust; Baloch Nushki; Ashraf Sugar Mills; Pakistan Airlines
- Matches: 182
- Goals: 398 (2.19 per match)
- Top goalscorer: Ansar Abbas (15 goals)
- Best goalkeeper: Tanvir Mumtaz (Khan Research Laboratories)
- Biggest home win: Pakistan Navy 6–1 Baloch Nushki (7 December 2018); National Bank 5–0 Baloch Nushki (19 December 2018); Pakistan Airforce 5–0 Baloch Nushki (9 January 2019)
- Biggest away win: Baloch Nushki 0–5 Pakistan Army (17 November 2018); Karachi Port Trust 0–5 Pakistan Army (17 December 2018); Afghan Chaman 0–5 Khan Research Laboratories (23 December 2018)
- Highest scoring: Pakistan Navy 6–1 Baloch Nushki (7 December 2018); Karachi Port Trust 2–5 Civil Aviation Authority (30 December 2018); Sui Northern Gas 4–3 Afghan Chaman (8 January 2019)
- Longest winning run: 5 matches Khan Research Laboratories; Pakistan Airforce; Sui Southern Gas
- Longest unbeaten run: 13 matches Khan Research Laboratories
- Longest winless run: 26 matches Baloch Nushki
- Longest losing run: 8 matches Baloch Nushki
- Highest attendance: 15,000; Khan Research Laboratories 4–0 Sui Southern Gas (13 January 2019)

The 2018–19 Pakistan Premier League was the 61st season of Pakistan domestic football and the 12th season of the Pakistan Premier League. It was the first edition of the league to be played since the 2014–15 season.

The league was reportedly not recognised by FIFA and AFC, as it was organised by two different federations. Faisal Saleh Hayat controversially-led Pakistan Football Federation, which was internationally recognised, started the league and non-FIFA recognised Ashfaq Hussain Shah group, who was elected PFF president in an election ordered by the Supreme Court a month before the termination of the season completed the event.

== Format and overview ==
The PPL matches for the season were held in Multan, Karachi and Lahore from 25 September 2018 to 11 January 2019, with 16 teams participating (12 PPL teams and 4 winner teams of second-tier playoffs). Each team would get to play each other twice, meaning in a season they would play 30 games. The bottom four teams got relegated to the second tier. The team that finished first would get qualification in the AFC Cup, but AFC denied entry of Pakistani football clubs in 2019 AFC Cup because of incomplete licensing regulations due to absence of footballing activity since the end of 2014-15 season.

=== Controversies ===
The Pakistan Premier League was reportedly not recognised by FIFA and AFC, as it was organised by two different federations. Faisal Saleh Hayat controversially-led Pakistan Football Federation, which was internationally recognised, started the league and non-FIFA recognised Ashfaq Hussain Shah group, who was elected PFF president in an election ordered by the Supreme Court a month before the termination of the season completed the event. The Hayat group also initially ended the league, making final payments and forcing the referees to boycott the remaining matches.

SSGC's promotion was also controversial, occurring through a one-match playoff that violated FIFA and AFC rules on team promotion and relegation. Further complicating matters, one of the promoted teams, Ashraf Sugar Mills, withdrew from the league midway, citing the high costs of competing at the top level. With football effectively stalled in the country for years, SSGC took advantage by recruiting leading players from the Pakistan national team. Once Hayat regained his position as PFF president in March 2018, after a six-month FIFA ban, international players along with team head coach Tariq Lutfi became hesitant to compete in the second division. Consequently, the PFF decided to promote four teams through a single-match playoff, bypassing the second-division league. The leading clubs were also refused a spot in the AFC Cup mainly due to club licensing issues.

The standard of the pitches, the refereeing and the introduction of qualifiers were also criticised along with spectators attacking a referee at Malir, and there was a lack of proper ambulance facilities. Referees also pulled out of the event when the new body took the league control.

However, positive changes introduced were live streaming of matches, subsidy and introduction of match bonuses, 80 percent increase in dailies for referees and match commissioners, fine accommodation for referees and payment of ground fee by the PFF itself. The total cost of the league was 20 million PKR.

== Venues ==
The 2018–19 Pakistan Premier Football League was staged in only three city legs rather than at individual club home grounds. The Multan leg at Qila Kohna Qasim Bagh Stadium (late Sep till early October), the Lahore leg primarily at Punjab Stadium (late October till November), and the Karachi leg at KPT Stadium (Dec till January), with some fixtures at KMC Stadium.

== Teams ==
=== Promotion and relegation ===
==== Teams relegated to FFL ====
Baloch Quetta and Pakistan Railways were relegated at the end of 2014–15 season (no league was held until current season).

==== Teams promoted from FFL ====
Pakistan Navy got promoted after winning 2014–15 Pakistan Football Federation League, defeating Baloch Nushki 1–0 in the finals.

==== Teams promoted from PPL Promotion Play-Offs 2018 ====
Civil Aviation Authority, Sui Southern Gas Company, Ashraf Sugar Mills and Sui Northern Gas Company won their matches and promoted to Pakistan Premier League.

Location of teams in 2018–19 Pakistan Premier League

Team	Location
Afghan Chaman	Chaman
Ashraf Sugar Mills	Bahawalpur
Baloch Nushki	Nushki
Civil Aviation Authority	Karachi
K-Electric	Karachi
Karachi Port Trust	Karachi
Khan Research Laboratories	Rawalpindi
Muslim	Quetta
National Bank	Karachi
Pakistan Air Force	Islamabad
Pakistan Army	Rawalpindi
Pakistan Navy	Islamabad
Pakistan Airlines	Karachi
Sui Southern Gas	Karachi
Sui Northern Gas	Lahore
WAPDA	Lahore

== Season summary ==
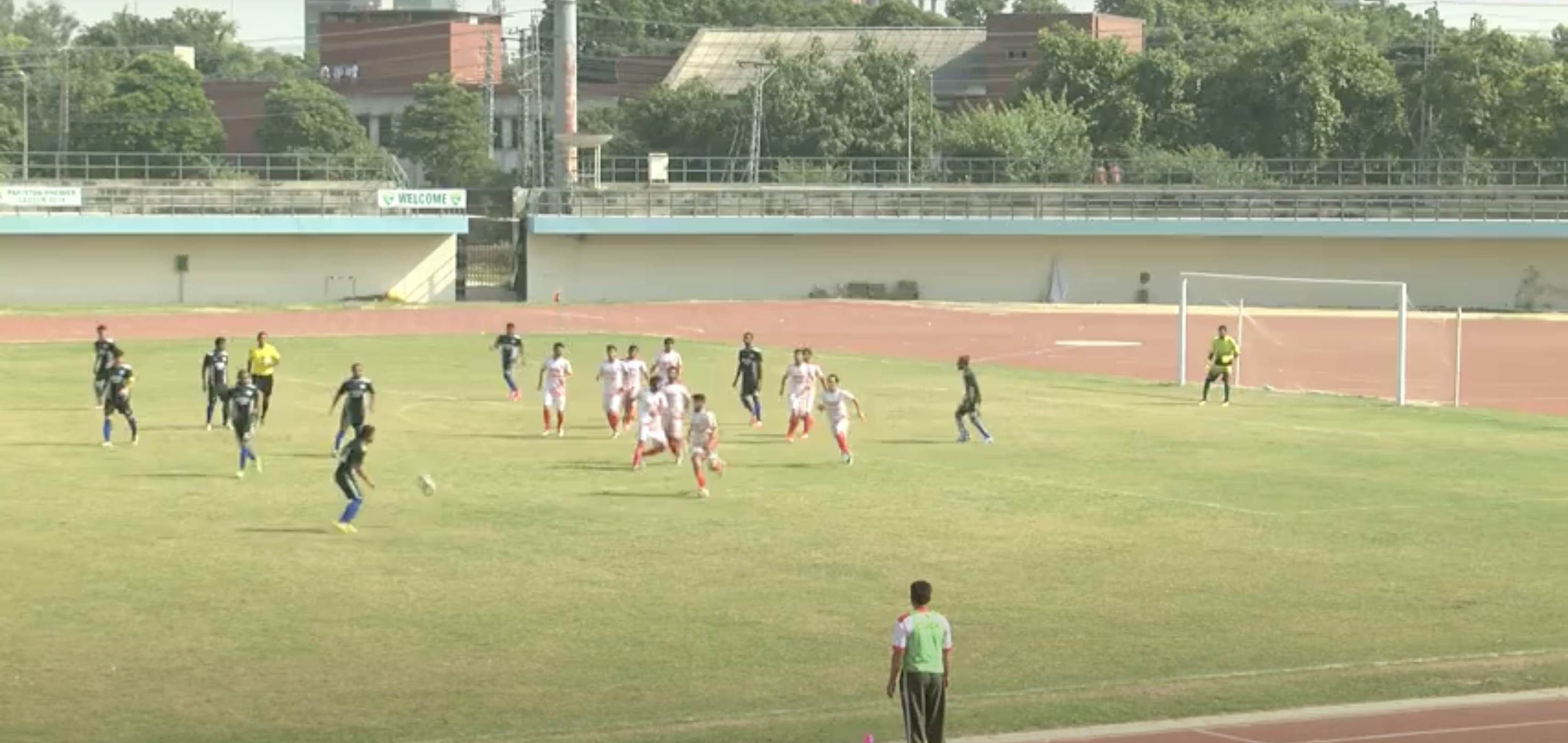
Afghan Chaman against Ashraf Sugar Mills on 22 October 2018

Ashraf Sugar Mills and Pakistan Airlines withdrew from league with former withdrawing after playing first phase in Multan and latter not playing a single match due to financial issues. Baloch Nushki got relegated after failing to win a single match and ended third last in relegation zone with six points from 6 draws. On 9 January 2019, Karachi Port Trust got relegated to Federation League for the first time ever, after they lost 2–0 to Muslim and 12th placed Sui Northern Gas winning their game match 4–3 against Afghan Chaman, leaving Karachi Port Trust 5 points from safe zone with only one match to play.

KRL FC won the league on the final match day. Pakistan Air Force F.C. (PAF FC) were sitting at the top of table with 51 points, one point ahead of SSGC FC and three ahead of Khan Research Laboratories, who both had to face each other on final match day. Sui Southern Gas victory would hand them the title and for Khan Research Laboratories, they to beat the Sui Southern Gas by four goals to secure the title. Khan Research Laboratories the last game of the season, defeating title contenders Sui Southern Gas 4–0, finishing first on goal difference ahead of PAF FC. This is the smallest title winning margin in the history of Pakistan Premier League, with Khan Research Laboratories winning with a goal difference of just +1, as PAF FC had a goal difference on +27 and winners Khan Research Laboratories had +28.

== League table ==
Pos	Team	Pld	W	D	L	GF	GA	GD	Pts	Qualification or relegation
1	Khan Research Laboratories (C)	26	14	9	3	40	12	+28	51	
2	Pakistan Airforce	26	14	9	3	40	13	+27	51	
3	Sui Southern Gas	26	15	5	6	32	16	+16	50	
4	Pakistan Army	26	12	10	4	38	19	+19	46	
5	WAPDA	26	13	6	7	32	18	+14	45	
6	K-Electric	26	10	11	5	30	21	+9	41	
7	Civil Aviation Authority	26	11	6	9	31	27	+4	39	
8	National Bank	26	9	6	11	27	27	0	33	
9	Pakistan Navy	26	10	3	13	30	37	−7	33	
10	Muslim	26	5	13	8	16	17	−1	28	
11	Afghan Chaman	26	8	4	14	24	44	−20	28	
12	Sui Northern Gas	26	3	14	9	28	33	−5	23	
13	Karachi Port Trust (R)	26	4	6	16	19	46	−27	18	Relegation to 2020 PFF League
14	Baloch Nushki (R)	26	0	6	20	12	69	−57	6	Relegation to 2020 PFF League
15	Ashraf Sugar Mills (Note: Ashraf Sugar Mills withdrew from the league due to financial issues. thus their results were annulled against all the teams, as per rules of Pakistan Football Federation.) (R)	0	0	0	0	0	0	0	0	Relegation to 2020 PFF League
16	Pakistan Airlines (Note: PIA didn't send the team for the league owing to financial reasons, though Pakistan Football Federation have not given walkover to any team.) (R)	0	0	0	0	0	0	0	0	Relegation to 2020 PFF League

Source: Soccerway.com
Rules for classification: 1) points; 2) head-to-head points; 3) head-to-head goal difference; 4) goal difference; 5) number of goals scored; 6) drawing of lots
(C) Champions; (R) Relegated

== Results ==
Home \ Away	AFG	ASM	BAL	CAA	KE	KPT	KRL	MUS	NBP	PAF	PAR	PAN	PIA	SSGC	SNGP	WAP
Afghan Chaman	—		3–2	0–2	2–2	1–0	0–5	0–4	0–1	0–3	0–2	3–2		0–3	2–1	0–1
Ashraf Sugar Mills	—	—	—	—	—	—	—	—	—	—	—	—	—	—	—	—
Baloch Nushki	0–4		—	0–0	2–4	2–2	0–2	0–1	0–0	0–3	0–5	0–1		1–3	0–0	0–2
Civil Aviation Authority	0–1		6–1	—	0–3	1–0	0–1	2–1	2–3	1–0	1–2	1–0		1–3	1–0	2–0
K-Electric	0–0		1–1	2–0	—	0–1	1–1	2–0	1–0	0–0	0–1	4–1		0–2	3–0	1–0
Karachi Port Trust	0–2		2–2	2–5	0–1	—	0–0	0–0	2–1	0–3	0–5	0–1		3–2	1–1	0–2
Khan Research Laboratories	3–0		3–0	2–1	1–1	1–0	—	0–0	3–0	0–0	0–1	0–1		4–0	1–1	1–0
Muslim	2–0		1–0	0–0	0–0	2–0	1–2	—	0–0	0–0	0–2	1–1		0–0	0–0	0–0
National Bank	0–1		5–0	1–0	1–1	1–3	0–1	2–1	—	0–1	1–1	2–0		1–0	2–0	0–2
Pakistan Airforce	2–0		5–0	4–0	0–0	1–0	1–1	1–1	0–2	—	1–2	2–0		1–0	2–2	2–1
Pakistan Army	1–1		1–0	0–1	0–0	3–0	1–1	1–1	2–1	2–2	—	1–2		1–0	1–1	0–2
Pakistan Navy	0–0		6–1	1–2	1–2	5–1	0–3	1–0	1–0	0–3	1–0	—		0–1	1–1	0–1
Pakistan Airlines	—	—	—	—	—	—	—	—	—	—	—	—	—	—	—	—
Sui Southern Gas	2–0		1–0	1–1	3–0	1–0	1–0	2–0	0–0	1–2	0–0	3–0		—	1–0	1–0
Sui Northern Gas	4–3		0–0	0–0	3–0	2–2	1–3	0–0	3–3	0–0	2–2	1–2		1–2	—	0–0
WAPDA	2–1		3–0	2–2	1–1	1–0	1–1	1–0	2–0	0–1	1–1	4–2		1–2	1–0	—

Updated to match(es) played on 10 January 2019. Source: Soccerway
Legend: Blue = home team win; Yellow = draw; Red = away team win.

a: Both Ashraf Sugar Mills and Pakistan Airlines withdrew from the league.

== Season statistics ==
=== Scoring ===
- First goal of the season: Ahmed Faheem for WAPDA against Pakistan Army (26 September 2018).
- Last goal of the season: Izharullah for Khan Research Laboratories against Sui Southern Gas (13 January 2018)
- Most goals scored by a single team in a match: 6 goals
  - Pakistan Navy 6–1 Baloch Nushki (7 December 2018)
- Highest scoring game: 7 goals
  - Pakistan Navy 6–1 Baloch Nushki (7 December 2018)
  - Karachi Port Trust 2–5 Civil Aviation Authority (30 December 2018)
  - Sui Northern Gas 4–3 Afghan Chaman (8 January 2019)
- Most goals scored in a match by a losing team: 3 goals
  - Sui Northern Gas 4–3 Afghan Chaman (8 January 2019)

==== Top scorers ====
As of 13 January 2019

Rank	Player	Club	Goals
1	(Pakistan) Ansar Abbas	Pakistan Army	15
2	(Pakistan) Muhammad Mujahid	Pakistan Airforce	13
2	(Pakistan) Muhammad Naeem	Civil Aviation Authority	13
3	(Pakistan) Muhammad Rasool	K-Electric	12
3	(Pakistan) Mansoor Khan	Pakistan Airforce	12
4	(Pakistan) Iftikhar Ali Khan	Khan Research Laboratories	11
5	(Pakistan) Ahmed Faheem	WAPDA	10

==== Hat-tricks ====
Player	For	Against	Result	Date	Ref
(Pakistan) Iftikhar Ali Khan	Khan Research Laboratories	National Bank	3–0 (H)	28 September 2018	
(Pakistan) Ahmed Faheem	Pakistan Airforce	Pakistan Navy	4–2 (H)	18 October 2018	
(Pakistan) Ansar Abbas^{4}	Pakistan Army	Baloch Nushki	5–0 (A)	17 November 2018	
(Pakistan) Hassan Faiz	Pakistan Navy	Baloch Nushki	6–1 (H)	7 December 2018	
(Pakistan) Muhammad Waheed ^{4}	Civil Aviation Authority	Karachi Port Trust	5–2 (A)	30 December 2018	

^{4} Player scored four goals
