= Muhammad Waheed =

Pakistani footballer (born 2002)

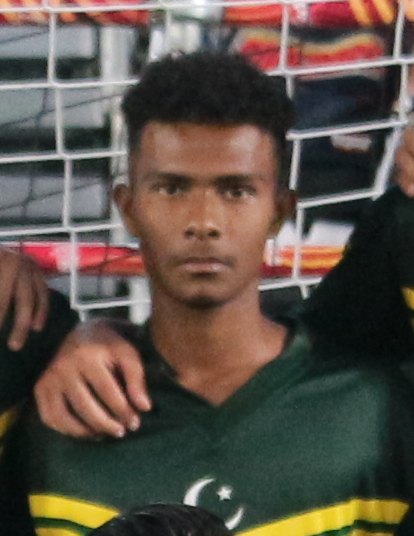
- Waheed in 2019

Personal information
- Full name: Muhammad Waheed Abdul Ghani
- Date of birth: 15 October 2002 (age 24)
- Place of birth: Karachi, Pakistan
- Height: 1.79 m (5 ft 10 in)
- Position: Forward

Team information
- Current team: Khan Research Laboratories

Youth career
- 2013–2018: Karachi United

Senior career*
| Years | Team | Apps | (Gls) |
| 2018–2021 | Civil Aviation Authority | 24 | (8) |
| 2021–2022 | Sui Southern Gas | 11 | (8) |
| 2022– | Khan Research Laboratories | | |

International career^{‡}
| 2019 | Pakistan U20 | 4 | (2) |
| 2023– | Pakistan U23 | 2 | (0) |
| 2022– | Pakistan | 8 | (0) |
- * Club domestic league appearances and goals as of 16:40, 23 November 2022 (UTC) ‡ National team caps and goals as of 03:21, 17 October 2023 (UTC)

Muhammad Waheed (born 15 October 2002) is a Pakistani professional footballer who plays as a forward for Khan Research Laboratories and the Pakistan national team.

== Early life and family ==
Waheed hails from the Malir District of Karachi. He comes from a family of footballers; his paternal grandfather, maternal uncles and his brother have played at the domestic level.

== Club career ==
=== Karachi United ===
Waheed began his youth career with Karachi United, having been selected at the age of 11.

=== Pakistan Civil Aviation Authority ===
Waheed began his senior career with departmental side Pakistan Civil Aviation Authority, becoming a consistent top goal-scorer in domestic competitions. He scored 8 goals in 24 appearances in the 2018–19 Pakistan Premier League. He also scored 7 goals in 4 appearances in the 2019 PFF National Challenge Cup, finishing as the top scorer.

=== Sui Southern Gas ===
Waheed joined Sui Southern Gas in 2021. He scored 8 goals in 11 appearances in the 2021–22 season until the league was cancelled shortly after starting.

=== Khan Research Laboratories ===
In late 2022 Waheed moved to Khan Research Laboratories. He soon made an impact, scoring two goals in a victory over Pakistan Army F.C. in the 2023 PFF National Challenge Cup.

== International career ==
Waheed represented Pakistan at the youth level in the 2020 AFC U-19 Championship qualification. He went on to score two goals in four appearances. His goals came in a 1–2 defeat to Kuwait and a 1–5 defeat to Palestine.

In late 2019 Waheed was included in Pakistan's 13-man squad for the Socca World Cup in Greece. He was the youngest player on any squad in the six-a-side tournament. In preparation for the tournament, he scored in a 2–1 friendly victory over Colombia. In the team's Group Stage match against Germany, he scored both of his team's goals in the 2–3 defeat. In January 2020, Waheed was named in Pakistan's squad for a two-match friendly tour in Malaysia against UKM and Felda United on 22 and 23 January, respectively. In the second and last match against Felda United, he scored the opening goal in the 16th minute in the eventual 2–0 victory.

In August 2022 Waheed was called up for trials with the senior national team. In November the same year, he was included in Pakistan's squad for a friendly against Nepal, Pakistan's first fixture in nearly three-and-a-half years because of the Pakistan Football Federation's suspension by FIFA. He made his senior international debut as a second-half substitute in the eventual 0–1 away defeat.

Waheed was called up to the senior squad again in February 2023 in preparation for upcoming friendlies, the 2023 SAFF Championship, and 2026 FIFA World Cup qualification.

== Career statistics ==
=== Club ===
As of match played 7 November 2021

Appearances and goals by club, season and competition
| Club | Season | League | | | National cup (Note: Includes PFF National Challenge Cup) | | Total | |
| Club | Season | Division | Apps | Goals | Apps | Goals | Apps | Goals |
|---|---|---|---|---|---|---|---|---|
| Civil Aviation Authority | 2018–19 | Pakistan Premier League | 24 | 8 | — | | 24 | 8 |
| Civil Aviation Authority | 2019–20 | Pakistan Premier League | — (Note: No league was held during 2019–20 season.) | | 4 | 7 | 4 | 7 |
| Civil Aviation Authority | 2020–21 | Pakistan Premier League | — (Note: No league was held during 2020–21 season.) | | 0 | 0 | 0 | 0 |
| Civil Aviation Authority | Total | | 24 | 8 | 4 | 7 | 28 | 15 |
| Sui Southern Gas | 2021–22 | Pakistan Premier League | 11 | 8 | — | | 11 | 8 |
| Career total | | | 35 | 16 | 4 | 7 | 39 | 23 |

=== International ===
As of 17 October 2023

Appearances and goals by national team and year
| National team | Year | Apps | Goals |
|---|---|---|---|
| Pakistan | 2022 | 1 | 0 |
| Pakistan | 2023 | 7 | 0 |
| Total | | 8 | 0 |

==== International goals ====
===== Youth =====
Scores and results list Pakistan's goal tally first.

| No | Date | Venue | Opponent | Score | Result | Competition |
|---|---|---|---|---|---|---|
| 1. | 22 November 2019 | Al-Seeb Stadium, Seeb, Oman | Kuwait U20 | 1–0 | 1–2 | 2020 AFC U-19 Championship qualification |
| 2. | 24 November 2019 | Al-Seeb Stadium, Seeb, Oman | Palestine U20 | 1–2 | 1–5 | 2020 AFC U-19 Championship qualification |
Last updated 23 November 2022
