= Mohib Ullah (footballer) =

Pakistani footballer

Personal information
- Full name: Mohib Ullah Afridi
- Date of birth: 23 May 2005 (age 21)
- Place of birth: Dara Adamkhel, Kohat District, Pakistan
- Height: 1.80 m (5 ft 11 in)
- Position: Centre-back

Youth career
- 2011–2019: Khyber Muslim
- 2019–2021: Karachi United

Senior career*
Years	Team	Apps	(Gls)
2021–	Karachi United	82	(4)
2024–2025	→ Aino FC (loan)		
2025	→ Aino FC (loan)		
2026	→ SA Gardens (loan)		
2026	→ Paro (loan)	14	(2)

International career^{‡}
2018–2019	Pakistan U15	7	(3)
2023–	Pakistan U23	3	(0)
2023–	Pakistan	12	(1)
- * Club domestic league appearances and goals as of October 2026 ‡ National team caps and goals as of 2 October 2026

Mohib Ullah Afridi (Urdu: محب اللہ آفریدی; born 23 May 2005) is a Pakistani professional footballer who plays as a defender for the Pakistan national team.

== Early life ==
Mohib's family originates from Dara Adamkhel in the Khyber Pakhtunkhwa province. He started playing football at Karachi based club Khyber Muslim in 2011. He later started training at Karachi United Football Academy.

== Club career ==
=== Karachi United ===
Mohib began his youth career with Karachi United in 2019. He made several appearances with the senior team and scored one goal in the 2021–22 season of the Pakistan Premier League, until the league was cancelled.

==== Loan to Aino FC ====
In November 2024, Mohib joined Aino Mina FC on a one-season loan for the 2024–25 Afghanistan Champions League.

==== Loan to Aino FC ====
In November 2025, Mohib was again loaned to Aino Mina FC for the 2025 Afghanistan Champions League season.

==== Loan to Paro FC ====
In April 2026, Mohib joined Bhutan Premier League club Paro FC. During his spell at Paro, Mohib won the Bhutan Premier League title and represented the club in the AFC Challenge League.

== International career ==
In October 2018, Mohib was called up to the Pakistan under-15 team for the 2018 SAFF U-15 Championship held in Nepal. He scored three goals in the tournament, including two against Nepal. Pakistan ended being the runners-up in the final against Bangladesh, where Mohib scored the equalizer in the 1–1 draw before his team lost in the penalty shootout. He also participated in the 2020 AFC U-16 Championship qualification in 2019 as captain.

In September 2023, Mohib was called up for the 2024 AFC U-23 Asian Cup qualification where he made three appearances, as Pakistan exited the group.

Mohib was handed his senior international debut with Pakistan by head coach Stephen Constantine on 21 November 2023 in the eventual 6–1 home defeat against Tajikistan, in the second round of the 2026 FIFA World Cup qualification, playing in an unfamiliar right-back position. Following a difficult performance, he was substituted at half-time and subsequently faced criticism.

Mohib later established himself as a regular member of Pakistan's defence, often playing alongside Abdullah Iqbal and Easah Suliman. On 2 October 2026, Mohib scored his first senior international goal against Vietnam during the 2026 FIFA ASEAN Cup. In the 31st minute, he dispossessed a Vietnamese defender before beating goalkeeper Patrik Le Giang to give Pakistan a 1–0 lead.

== Career statistics ==
=== International ===
As of 2 October 2026

Appearances and goals by national team and year
National team	Year	Apps	Goals
Pakistan	2023	1	0
Pakistan	2025	4	0
Pakistan	2026	7	1
Total		12	1

Scores and results list Pakistan's goal tally first, score column indicates score after each Ullah goal.

List of international goals scored by Mohib Ullah
No.	Date	Venue	Opponent	Score	Result	Competition
1	2 October 2026	Gelora Bung Karno Stadium, Jakarta, Indonesia	Vietnam	1–0	2–4	2026 FIFA ASEAN Cup

== Honours ==
Pakistan

- Diamond Jubilee International Football Tournament: 2026

Paro

- Bhutan Premier League: 2026
