= 2013–14 Pakistan Premier League =

Pakistan Premier League
- Season: 2013–14
- Champions: Khan Research Laboratories; 4th Premier League title 4th Pakistani title
- Relegated: Habib Bank; Pakistan Navy; Lyallpur; Pak Afghan Clearing; Baloch Nushki; Zarai Taraqiati
- AFC President's Cup: Khan Research Laboratories
- Matches: 240
- Goals: 559 (2.33 per match)
- Top goalscorer: Muhammad Bin Younus (27 goals)
- Biggest home win: Karachi Port Trust 7–0 Baloch Nushki (1 November 2013)
- Biggest away win: Pak Afghan Clearing 2–7 Karachi Port Trust (10 January 2014)
- Highest scoring: Pak Afghan Clearing 2–7 Karachi Port Trust (10 January 2014)
- Longest winning run: 10 games Khan Research Laboratories
- Longest unbeaten run: 10 games Khan Research Laboratories
- Longest winless run: 11 games Zarai Taraqiati
- Longest losing run: 7 games Baloch Nushki

The 2013–14 Pakistan Premier League was the 10th season of the Pakistan Premier League and the 59th season of Pakistan domestic football. The league began on 1 September 2013 and ended on 8 February 2014. Khan Research Laboratories ended up winning the championship for the third consecutive season and their fourth title overall.

Zarai Taraqiati (ZTBL), in their first season after promotion, withdrew from the league after playing 17 games. This happened after ZTBL’s top authorities learned that the team would be relegated to the second-tier league at the end of the season. They stopped the team from playing any more matches. Thus they forfeited 13 matches which was against the rules.

== Venues ==
The 2013–14 Pakistan Premier League was staged only at two centralised venues, in Karachi (KPT Stadium, Korangi Baloch Stadium, KMC Stadium used periodically) and Lahore (Railway Stadium).

== Teams ==
PMC Club Athletico Faisalabad and Wohaib were relegated at the end of the 2012–13 campaign. They were replaced by Pak Afghan Clearing and Lyallpur.

Club	City
Afghan Chaman	Chaman
Baloch Nushki	Nushki
Habib Bank	Karachi
Karachi Electric Supply Corporation	Karachi
Karachi Port Trust	Karachi
Khan Research Laboratories	Rawalpindi
Lyallpur	Faisalabad
Muslim	Quetta
National Bank	Karachi
Pak Afghan Clearing	Chaman
Pakistan Airforce	Peshawar
Pakistan Army	Rawalpindi
Pakistan Airlines	Karachi
Pakistan Navy	Karachi
WAPDA	Lahore
Zarai Taraqiati	Islamabad

== League table ==
Pos	Team	Pld	W	D	L	GF	GA	GD	Pts	Qualification or relegation
1	Khan Research Laboratories	30	20	6	4	52	10	+42	66	2014 AFC President's Cup
2	Karachi Electric Supply Corporation	30	18	10	2	47	20	+27	64	
3	WAPDA	30	17	12	1	43	14	+29	63	
4	Pakistan Airforce	30	14	8	8	41	29	+12	50	
5	Pakistan Army	30	13	9	8	35	23	+12	48	
6	Pakistan Airlines	30	13	7	10	45	40	+5	46	
7	Muslim	30	12	8	10	33	32	+1	44	
8	Karachi Port Trust	30	11	7	12	63	50	+13	40	
9	National Bank	30	9	10	11	25	25	0	37	
10	Afghan Chaman	30	9	9	12	35	36	−1	36	
11	Habib Bank	30	9	8	13	26	33	−7	35	Relegation to 2014-15 Pakistan Football Federation League
12	Pakistan Navy	30	9	8	13	28	37	−9	35	Relegation to 2014-15 Pakistan Football Federation League
13	Lyallpur	30	6	8	16	27	45	−18	26	Relegation to 2014-15 Pakistan Football Federation League
14	Pak Afghan Clearing	30	4	12	14	22	45	−23	24	Relegation to 2014-15 Pakistan Football Federation League
15	Baloch Nushki	30	5	5	20	21	58	−37	20	Relegation to 2014-15 Pakistan Football Federation League
16	Zarai Taraqiati	30	4	5	21	16	62	−46	17	Relegation to 2014-15 Pakistan Football Federation League

Source: Soccerway
Rules for classification: 1) points; 2) goal difference; 3) number of goals scored.

== Awards ==
Award	Player	Club
Top scorer	Muhammad Bin Younus	Karachi Port Trust
Best goalkeeper	Muzammil Hussain	WAPDA
Best Player of the Season	Kaleemullah Khan	Khan Research Laboratories
Fairplay award	–	Khan Research Laboratories
