= Karachi Port Trust Stadium =

Football stadium in Pakistan

KPT Football Stadium
- کراچی پورٹ ٹرسٹ اسٹیڈیم
- KPT Stadium
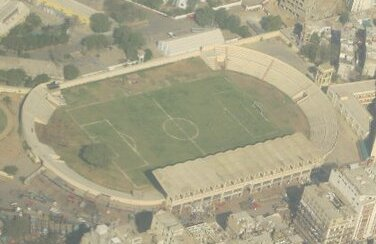
- Interactive map of KPT Football Stadium
- Full name: Karachi Port Trust Football Stadium
- Location: West Wharf, Karachi, Pakistan
- Coordinates: 24°51′02.6″N 66°59′28.8″E
- Owner: DHA
- Capacity: 20,000
- Surface: Grass
- Scoreboard: yes

Construction
- Builder: DHA

Tenant
- Karachi Port Trust FC

The Karachi Port Trust Football Stadium is a football stadium in the West Wharf, Kharadar area of Karachi, Pakistan. Located inside the Benazir Sports Complex, the stadium is the home ground of KPT FC, among other football clubs. The stadium has a capacity of around 15,000 people.

== Location ==
It is located inside the Benazir Sports Complex on Akbar Siddiqui Road in the West Wharf Industrial Area of Karachi.

== Matches ==
It has hosted several national and local football competitions, including the 2009-10, 2010-11, and 2011–12 editions of the Pakistan Premier League, and the 2012, 2014, 2016, 2018, 2023, and 2026 editions of the National Challenge Cup.

== See also ==
- List of football stadiums in Pakistan
