= Pak Afghan Clearing Agency FC =

Football club in Pakistan

Pak Afghan Clearing Agency
- Full name: Pak Afghan Clearing Football Club
- Short name: PACA
- Founded: 2012; 14 years ago
- Ground: Essa Khan Football Ground
- Owner: Muhammad Essa

Pak Afghan Clearing Agency Football Club, abbreviated as PACA, is a Pakistani institutional football club based in Chaman, Balochistan. It has briefly competed in the Pakistan Premier League, the top tier of the football league system in the country. The club also participated in the country's second-tier PFF National Challenge Cup.

== History ==
PACA was founded as a hybrid of a department and football club co-owned by former Pakistan international Muhammad Essa. The club spent only one year in the top-flight, after winning the 2012 PFF League. They finished 14th in the 2013–14 Pakistan Premier League and were relegated after only one year in the Pakistan Premier League.

== Stadium ==
The Essa Khan Football Ground in Chaman serves as the team home stadium.

== Notable players ==
The players below had senior international cap(s) for their respective countries. Players whose name is listed, represented their countries before or after playing for Pak Afghan FC.

Asia

- (Afghanistan) Yar Mohammad Zakarkhel (2023)

== Honours ==
- Football Federation League
  - Winners (1): 2012
