= Lyallpur FC =

Pakistani football club

Lyallpur F.C
- Full name: Lyallpur Football Club
- Short name: LFC
- Coach: Mohammad Habib
- League: Pakistan Premier League
- 2021: Football Federation League, Champions
Home colours	Away colours

Lyallpur Football Club is a Pakistani professional football club based in Faisalabad, Punjab.

== History ==
=== University Football Club ===
The club, previously known as University Football Club, won the Punjab Inter-Division Club Championship in Jaranwala after defeating Al Hilal Club from Arifwala by penalties, hence qualified for the 2010 PFF League along with the runner-ups. After advancing to the second round of the 2010 PFF League club phase, the team finished third in the table behind Muslim FC and Wohaib.

=== Promotion to top-tier and name change (2012–2014) ===
University Football Club got promoted from the 2012 PFF League along with the runner-ups after defeating Pak Afghan in the final by 3–0. The club subsequently changed their name to Lyallpur FC, reflecting the old name of the city of Faisalabad, before the start of the 2013–14 Pakistan Premier League. The club was relegated at the end of the season, finishing 14th in the table.

=== Return to PFF League (2014–2020) ===
In the 2014 Pakistan Football Federation League, the club finished as leader in the group A of the club phase ahead of Huma and Mardan Blue Star. However, they ended as last in the final club stage behind Baloch Nushki and Almo Mohammedan.

=== Nomination in the top-tier (2021–present) ===
Lyallpur was included in the 2021–22 Pakistan Premier League, replacing other teams which skipped participation. The league was suspended a few months into the season and then cancelled.

== Players ==
=== Current squad ===
As of 1 August 2023

Note: Flags indicate national team as defined under FIFA eligibility rules; some limited exceptions apply. Players may hold more than one non-FIFA nationality.

No.	Pos.	Nation	Player
—	GK	PAK	Zulqarnain Haider
—	GK	PAK	Umair Naseeb
—	GK	PAK	Talha Tahir
—	GK	PAK	Hassan Ali
—	DF	PAK	Shahram Babar
—	DF	PAK	Rehan Munir
—	DF	PAK	Haq Nawaz
—	DF	PAK	Muhammad Waqas
—	DF	PAK	Mubashir Ali
—	DF	PAK	Sajid Mehmood
—	DF	PAK	Rajab Ali
—	DF	PAK	Atta Muhammad
—	DF	PAK	Saqib Nadeem
—	DF	PAK	Sajjad Anwar
—	DF	PAK	Umar Javed

No.	Pos.	Nation	Player
—	MF	PAK	Hassnain Abbas
—	MF	PAK	Muhammad Adil
—	MF	PAK	Zahid Majeed
—	MF	PAK	Muhammad Idrees
—	MF	PAK	Usman Manzoor
—	MF	PAK	Naeem Ullah
—	MF	PAK	Adeel Ali
—	MF	PAK	Zaid Ahmed
—	MF	PAK	Yaseen Nawaz
—	MF	PAK	Wajid Hussain
—	MF	PAK	Haider Ali
—	MF	PAK	Haseeb Arshad
—	MF	PAK	Abu Al Kalam
—	FW	PAK	Muhammad Zain Ul Abideen
—	FW	PAK	Sagar
—	FW	PAK	Junaid Tariq

== Personnel ==
=== Current technical staff ===
As of 1 August 2023

Position	Name
Head Coach	(Pakistan) Mohammad Habib
Assistant Coach	(Pakistan) Nadeem Sarwar
Team Manager	(Pakistan) Tahir Hussain
Assistant Team Manager	(Pakistan) Sajid Ishaq
Goalkeeper Coach	(Pakistan) Umer Daraz
Fitness Coach	(Pakistan) Nasir Hussain
Physiotherapist	(Pakistan) Abid Hussain

== Coaching history ==
- (Pakistan) Muhammad Afzal (2010)
- (Pakistan) Mohammad Habib (2012–present)

== Competitive record ==
The club's competitive records since the 2010–11 season are listed below.

Season	Div	Tms	Pos	National Challenge Cup	AFC President's Cup	AFC Cup
2010–11	PFF League	16	Final group stage	DNP	DNP	DNP
2011–12	PFF League	17	Final group stage	DNP	DNP	DNP
2012–13	PFF League	20	1	DNP	DNP	DNP
2013–14	Pakistan Premier League	16	14	DNP	DNP	DNP
2014–15	PFF League	30	Final group stage	DNP	DNP	DNP
2020–21	PFF League	19	Group stage	Group stage	DNP	DNP

== Honours ==
- PFF League
  - Champions (1): 2012–13
