= Karachi Port Trust FC =

Pakistani football club

Karachi Port Trust
- Full name: Karachi Port Trust Football Club
- Nickname: The Portmen
- Short name: KPT
- Founded: 1887; 139 years ago
- Dissolved: 2021; 5 years ago
- Ground: KPT Stadium
- Capacity: 20,000
- Owner: Karachi Port Trust
| Home colours | Away colours |

Karachi Port Trust Football Club served as the football section of Karachi Port Trust. Founded during the British Raj, it is one the oldest football teams in Pakistan. Based in Kharadar, Karachi, the club played their home matches at KPT Stadium. The club used to compete in the National Football Championship and Pakistan Premier League.

== History ==
=== Early years ===
The football team was established during the British Raj, and is believed to have been founded in 1887, the year the Karachi Port Trust was established. By the 1930s, the team was reported playing in several tournaments in Karachi.

=== Post-independence (1947–1960s) ===
In 1959, the team captained by Pakistan national team left winger Ibrahim, and including other internationals such as goalkeeper Shamoo Abdul Ghani, toured Portuguese-ruled Goa for two friendlies. An opening game in Panaji against a local Goa XI ended in a 1–1 draw, and a second match in Margão against a Goa Selection ending in a 0–1 loss for KPT. Some sources state a win for KPT in the first match.

=== National success and continental debut (1960s–1992) ===

Karachi Port Trust's starting line-up at the 1964 Aga Khan Gold Cup final replay against Dhaka Mohammedan.

In 1964, the team jointly won 1964 Aga Khan Gold Cup along with Dhaka Mohammedan, after drawing the final match by nil, and the replay match by 1–1.

In October 1971, KPT won the Iranian Monarchy Celebration Football Tournament held in Karachi, defeating PIA in the final by 2–0.

In the 1987 National Football Championship, the club finished as runner-up after falling against Crescent Textile Mills in the final.

KPT won the National Departmental Championship in 1990. Subsequently the team played at the 1991–92 Asian Cup Winners’ Cup, where they lost 0–9 on aggregate to Indonesia’'s Pupuk Kaltim (6–0, 3–0) in the first round.

=== Entry to the Pakistan Premier League (2004–2011) ===
The club is one of the founding members of current top-flight Pakistan Premier League, appearing in every season since the first edition in 2004.

=== Crisis years (2012–2019) ===
In 2012, the club was hit hard in middle of a crisis as KESC and NBP signed its key players, and the consequent disappointing results and ongoing struggle with the management. The team ultimately was relegated in the 2018-19 Pakistan Premier League.

=== Disbandment ===
The club was closed after the shutdown of departmental sports in Pakistan in September 2021. In 2023, the parental organization hinted at the revive the sport clubs after the restoration of departmental sports in Pakistan in 2022, however no progress was made.

== Stadium ==
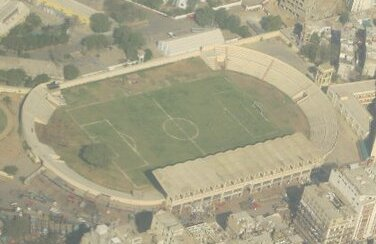
Aerial view of the KPT Stadium

The Karachi Port Trust Stadium in Karachi serve as the team own ground. It has regularly hosted several Pakistan Premier League and National Challenge Cup fixtures.

== Rivalries ==
Karachi Port Trust and Pakistan International Airlines had a long lasting rivalry in Karachi football, with fixtures between the two teams described as meetings of arch-rivals.

== Performance in AFC competitions ==
Win Draw Loss

| Season | Competition | Round | Club | First leg | Second leg | Aggregate |
|---|---|---|---|---|---|---|
| 1991–92 | Asian Cup Winners' Cup | First Round | (Indonesia) Pupuk Kaltim | 0–6 | 0–3 | 0–9 |

== Honours ==
=== Domestic ===
- National Departmental Championship/PFF President's Cup
  - Winners (1): 1990
  - Runner-up (2): 1998, 2003
- KPT-PFF Cup
  - Winners (1): 2010

=== Invitational ===
- Aga Khan Gold Cup
  - Winners (1): 1964 (shared)
