= Pakistan Air Force FC =

Pakistani football club

PAF F.C.
- Full name: Pakistan Air Force Football Club
- Short name: PAF
- Founded: 1947; 79 years ago
- Ground: PAF Sports Complex, Islamabad; PAF Sports Complex, Peshawar
- Owner: Pakistan Air Force
- Chairman: AM Asim Suleman
- Manager: Salman Chaudhry
Home colours	Away colours

Pakistan Air Force Football Club, abbreviated as PAF FC, serves as the football section of Pakistan Air Force. The club used to compete in the National Football Championship and Pakistan Premier League. It regularly participates in the National Football Challenge Cup.

== History ==
=== Early years (1947–1970s) ===
Pakistan Air Force football team was established in 1947, shortly after the Partition of British India, and the consequent partition of the British Indian military forces. Members serving in the Royal Indian Air Force both as employees and players, such as Moideen Kutty, immediately became part of the newly established Pakistan Air Force and their sport teams. In their early years, from 1947 till 1956, the football team was named as Royal Pakistan Air Force (RPAF).

In the 1950s, Pakistan Air Force played the Inter-Services Football Championship at the domestic level in Pakistan. In August 1960, PAF won the fifth Ismail Gold Shield Football Tournament, which featured guest teams from India and Iran. In 1961, PAF played a friendly game against the Iranian club Shahin F.C., with PAF international forward Faqir Hussain scoring all 4 goals for his team in a match which ended in a 6–4 defeat.

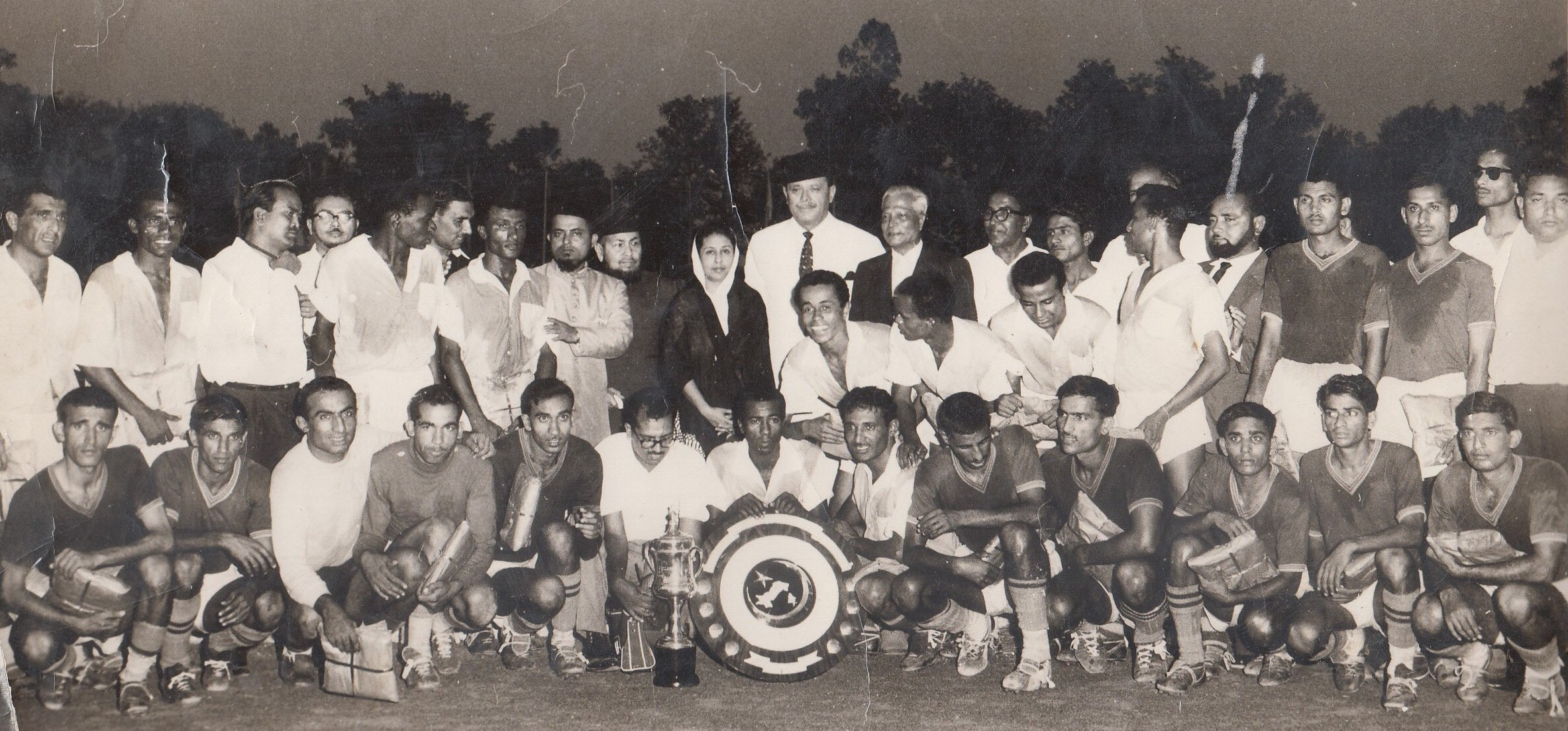
Victoria SC and Pakistan Air Force during the 1963 All-Pakistan Mohammad Ali Bogra Memorial Tournament final pictured with Ayub Khan

In 1963, the club were runners-up in the All-Pakistan Mohammad Ali Bogra Memorial Football Tournament, losing 1–3 to Victoria SC in the final held in Rawalpindi.

=== Early success and continental debut (1980s–1990s) ===
In the 1981 National Football Championship, it finished as runner-up, losing to Pakistan Airlines in the final.

Pakistan Air Force clinched gold in the first edition of football when it was introduced in the National Games of Pakistan.

Their first National Football Championship title came in 1986, defeating Pakistan Airlines in the final. Consequently, at the 1987 Asian Club Championship qualifying round in Dhaka from 8 till 16 June 1987, the team was placed in a group stage with winning sides from India, Bangladesh, Nepal and Iraq. India's Mohun Bagan outplayed PAF 4–1. With 3–0 lead at interval, the margin widened by another goal in the second half. PAF's only goal came in the second half from Abdul Rahman. Nepal's Manag Marshyangdi trounced PAF 4–1. The lone goal for PAF was scored by Abdul Shakoor. The Iraqi Club Al-Rasheed defeated PAF by 10–0 . This was the third defeat in a row for the PAF, thus the team failed to qualify for the final round of the Asian Clubs Championship.

=== Pakistan Premier League era: 2008–2019 ===
They were promoted to the Pakistan Premier League from the PFF League after finishing second to Baloch Nushki in the 2007–08 season.

At the end of 2013 after the appointment of coach Shahzad Anwar, Air Force ended up in fourth position in the 2013–14 Pakistan Premier League season, and ended up champions in the 2014 National Football Challenge Cup.

It won the 2018 National Challenge Cup, after defeating WAPDA 2–1 in the finals.

=== 2023–present ===
Following the domestic football revamp in the country in 2023, departmental clubs including Air Force remained competing in the National Football Challenge Cup.

== Stadium ==
The club has two home grounds; the PAF Sports Complex, Islamabad and the PAF Sports Complex, Peshawar. For the 2009 Pakistan Premier League, the Pakistan Football Federation allocated eight of PAF's 13 home matches to the Islamabad complex. The team's remaining five home fixtures were assigned to the Peshawar complex.

== Performance in AFC competitions ==
Win Draw Loss

Season	Competition	Round	Club	First leg	Second leg	Aggregate
1987–88	Asian Club Championship	Qualifying Stage	(India) Mohun Bagan	1–4		
1987–88	Asian Club Championship	Qualifying Stage	(Bangladesh) Dhaka Mohammedan	1–3		
1987–88	Asian Club Championship	Qualifying Stage	(Nepal) Manang Marsyangdi	1–4		
1987–88	Asian Club Championship	Qualifying Stage	(Iraq) Al Rasheed	0–10		

== Honours ==
=== Domestic ===
- National Football Championship
  - Winners (1): 1986
- National Challenge Cup
  - Winners (2): 2014, 2018
- National Games
  - Winners (2): 1982, 2025
