= 2019–20 Pakistan Army F.C. season =

Pakistan Army
2019–20 season
- Owner: Pakistan Army
- Chairman: Brig. Gen. Saleem Nawaz
- Manager: Ghayoor Ali Hamdani
- Stadium: Army Stadium
- National Challenge Cup: Winners
- Top goalscorer: League: All: Ansar Abbas (3 goals)
Home colours	Away colours
- All statistics correct as of August 4, 2019.

The 2019–20 season is Pakistan Army's 69th season of competitive football, 68th season in the top division of Pakistani football and 12th season in the Pakistan Premier League since it was first created. In addition to the Pakistan Premier League, the club competed in the National Challenge Cup.

During this season, Pakistan Army won National Challenge Cup for the third, winning their first since 2001.

== Competitions ==
Win Draw Loss

=== Overview ===
Competition	Record							
Competition	G	W	D	L	GF	GA	GD	Win %
National Challenge Cup	6	4	2	0	9	4	+5	66.67
Total	6	4	2	0	9	4	+5	66.67

Updated to match played 4 August 2019
Source: Competitions

=== National Challenge Cup ===
Pakistan Army were drawn in Group C of the National Challenge Cup alongside Pakistan Railways, PFF Tigers and Civil Aviation Authority.

Group stages

Pos	Team	Pld	W	D	L	GF	GA	GD	Pts	Qualification
1	Pakistan Army	3	2	1	0	4	2	+2	7	Advance to Knockout round
2	Civil Aviation Authority	3	1	2	0	8	2	+6	5	Advance to Knockout round
3	PFF Tigers	3	0	2	1	1	2	−1	2	
4	Pakistan Railways	3	0	1	2	1	8	−7	1	

Updated to match(es) played on 25 July 2019. Source: GSA

22 July 2019	Pakistan Army	1–0	PFF Tigers	Peshawar
17:15 PST	Shahid Iqbal (yellow card) 73'; M. Jamil 90'	Report	Rizwan Ullah (yellow card) 80'	Stadium: Tehmas Khan Football Stadium; Attendance: 500

26 July 2019	Pakistan Army	1–0	Pakistan Railways	Peshawar
17:00 PST	Ali Raza 9'	Report		Stadium: Tehmas Khan Football Stadium

28 July 2019	Civil Aviation Authority	2–2	Pakistan Army	Peshawar
17:00 PST	Nouman Saud (yellow card) 12'; M. Nasir 31', 51'; Nisar Ahmad (yellow card) 45+3'	Report	Shakeel Ahmed 6'; M. Waheed 62'; Waseem Asghar (yellow card) 90+3'	Stadium: Tehmas Khan Football Stadium

Quarter-finals

31 July 2019	Pakistan Army	2–0 (a.e.t.)	Pakistan Navy	Peshawar
20:00 PST	Abbas 101'; Nisar Ahmed (yellow card) 110'; Zil Hasnain 113'	Report		Stadium: Tehmas Khan Football Stadium; Attendance: 2,000

Semi-finals

2 August 2019	Khan Research Laboratories	0–0 (a.e.t.) (1–3 p)	Pakistan Army	Peshawar
18:00 PST		Report		Stadium: Tehmas Khan Football Stadium
	Penalties
	Umair Ali (penalty scored); Iftikhar A. Khan (penalty missed); Shahid (penalty missed); Ghulam Fareed (penalty missed)		(penalty scored) Nisar Ahmed; (penalty scored) Najeeb-ur-Rehman; (penalty scored) M. Jamil

Final

4 August 2019	Sui Southern Gas	2–3	Pakistan Army	Peshawar
21:00 PST	Saadullah 41'; M. Tahir 52'	Report	Shahid Iqbal (yellow card) 35'; Mohammad Sarfaraz (yellow card) 66'; Abbas 67', 75'; Ali Raza 77'	Stadium: Tehmas Khan Football Stadium

== Squad information ==
=== First team squad ===
As of 4 August 2019.

Squad No.	Name	Nationality	Position(s)	Since	Date of birth (age)	Signed from	Games played	Goals scored
Goalkeepers
1	Shahbaz Ahmed Khan	(Pakistan)	GK	2014	29 March 1988 (aged 31)	Academy	36	0
18	Ahmed Manzoor	(Pakistan)	GK	2019	8 April 1997 (aged 22)	(Pakistan) Ashraf Sugar Mills	0	0
Defenders
2	Mir Sheraz-ud-din	(Pakistan)	RB / LB	2018	22 August 1996 (aged 22)	Academy	3	0
3	Nisar Ahmed	(Pakistan)	LB	2014	7 October 1994 (aged 24)	Academy	42	3
4	Shahid Iqbal	(Pakistan)	CB	2013	26 January 1994 (aged 25)	Academy	41	0
5	Shahbaz Younas	(Pakistan)	CB	2014	2 March 1996 (aged 23)	Academy	31	2
12	Nouman Saud	(Pakistan)	CB	2019	1 February 1997 (aged 22)	Academy	0	0
13	Muhammad Irshad	(Pakistan)	CB	2015	30 May 1994 (aged 25)	Academy	0	0
14	Muhammad Zahid	(Pakistan)	CB	2018	27 February 1996 (aged 23)	Academy	5	0
Midfielders
6	Umair Ali	(Pakistan)	CM	2015	18 July 1999 (aged 20)	(Pakistan) Karachi Port Trust	23	1
7	Zil Hasnain	(Pakistan)	CM	2014	3 August 1992 (aged 26)	Academy	28	3
8	Muhammad Afzaal	(Pakistan)	DM / CM	2018	20 November 1998 (aged 20)	Academy	20	0
15	Najeed-ur-Rehman	(Pakistan)	AM	2012	2 September 1994 (aged 24)	Academy	54	6
16	Muhammad Sufyan	(Pakistan)	DM / CM	2019	1 January 1998 (aged 21)	Academy	0	0
21	Ansar Abbas (c)	(Pakistan)	AM	2012	15 April 1989 (aged 30)	Academy	92	50
Strikers
9	Ali Raza (vc)	(Pakistan)	CF	2018	13 May 1996 (aged 23)	Academy	22	3
10	Muhammad Sarfaraz	(Pakistan)	CF	2014	16 March 1989 (aged 30)	Academy	17	9
11	Mateen Tariq	(Pakistan)	CF	2018	1 July 1999 (aged 20)	Academy	24	7
17	Abdul Rehman	(Pakistan)	CF	2014	27 May 1995 (aged 24)	Pakistan Television	4	0
19	Muhammad Nasir	(Pakistan)	CF	2019	3 April 1997 (aged 22)	Academy	0	0
20	Qadeer Hussain	(Pakistan)	CF	2018	23 December 1997 (aged 21)	Academy	0	0
23	Muhammad Jamil	(Pakistan)	CF	2014	2 March 1993 (aged 26)	(Pakistan) Atish Tank	0	0

== Statistics ==
=== Squad statistics ===
As of match played 4 August 2019

Appearances (Apps.) numbers are for appearances in competitive games only including sub appearances
Red card numbers denote: Numbers in parentheses represent red cards overturned for wrongful dismissal.

No.	Nat.	Player	Pos.	Premier League				National Challenge Cup				Total			
No.	Nat.	Player	Pos.	Apps	Goal	Booked	Sent off (straight red)	Apps	Goal	Booked	Sent off (straight red)	Apps	Goal	Booked	Sent off (straight red)
1	(Pakistan)	Shahbaz Ahmed	GK					1				1			
2	(Pakistan)	Mir Sheraz-ud-Din	DF					2				2			
3	(Pakistan)	Nisar Ahmed	DF					4		2		4		2	
4	(Pakistan)	Shahid Iqbal	DF					4		1		4		1	
5	(Pakistan)	Shahbaz Younas	DF					6				6			
6	(Pakistan)	Umair Ali	MF					2				2			
7	(Pakistan)	Zil Hasnain	MF					6	1			6	1		
8	(Pakistan)	Muhammad Afzaal	MF					3				3			
9	(Pakistan)	Ali Raza	FW					1 (3)	2			1 (3)	2		
10	(Pakistan)	Mohammad Sarfaraz	FW					1				1			
11	(Pakistan)	Mateen Tariq	FW					(3)				(3)			
12	(Pakistan)	Nouman Saud	DF					5		1		5		1	
13	(Pakistan)	Muhammad Irshad	DF					1				1			
14	(Pakistan)	Muhammad Zahid	DF												
15	(Pakistan)	Najeeb-ur-Rehman	MF					(1)				(1)			
16	(Pakistan)	Muhammad Sufyan	MF					1				1			
17	(Pakistan)	Abdul Rehman	FW					3				3			
18	(Pakistan)	Manzoor Ahmed	GK					5				5			
19	(Pakistan)	Mohammad Nasir	FW					4	2			4	2		
20	(Pakistan)	Qadeer Hussain	FW					1				1			
21	(Pakistan)	Ansar Abbas	MF					6	3			6	3		
23	(Pakistan)	Muhammad Jamil	FW					5	1			5	1		
Own goals															
Totals								61	9	4		61	9	4	

=== Goalscorers ===
As of match played 4 August 2019

Includes all competitive matches. The list is sorted alphabetically by surname when total goals are equal.

No.	Pos.	Player	Premier League	National Challenge Cup	TOTAL
21	MF	(Pakistan) Ansar Abbas		3	3
9	FW	(Pakistan) Ali Raza		2	2
19	FW	(Pakistan) Muhammad		2	2
23	FW	(Pakistan) Muhammad Jmail		1	1
7	MF	(Pakistan) Zil Hasnain		1	1
Own Goals				0	0
Totals				9	9

=== Clean sheets ===
As of match played 4 August 2019

The list is sorted by shirt number when total clean sheets are equal. Numbers in parentheses represent games where both goalkeepers participated and both kept a clean sheet; the number in parentheses is awarded to the goalkeeper who was substituted on, whilst a full clean sheet is awarded to the goalkeeper who was on the field at the start of play.

No.	Player	Premier League	National Challenge Cup	TOTAL
18	(Pakistan) Ahmed Manzoor		3	3
1	(Pakistan) Shahbaz Ahmed Khan		1	1
Totals			4	4
