= 2019 National Challenge Cup final =

2019 National Football Challenge Cup final
- Event: National Challenge Cup
Sui Southern Gas	Pakistan Army
2	3
- Date: 4 August 2019
- Venue: Tehmas Khan Football Stadium, Peshawar

The 2019 National Football Challenge Cup final was a football match between Pakistan Army and Sui Southern Gas played on 4 August 2019 at Tehmas Khan Football Stadium in Peshawar. Pakistan Army won their National Challenge Cup title after having won the last time in 2001.

== Road to final ==
Sui Southern Gas
Round
Pakistan Army
Opponent
Result
Group stage
Opponent
Result
Pakistan Television
1–1
Matchday 1
PFF Tigers
1–0
Pakistan Navy
2–1
Matchday 2
Pakistan Railways
1–0

Matchday 3
Civil Aviation Authority
2–2
Group B winner

Team	Pld	W	D	L	GF	GA	GD	Pts
Sui Southern Gas	2	1	1	0	3	2	+1	4
Pakistan Navy	2	1	0	1	3	2	+1	3
Pakistan Television	2	0	1	1	1	3	−2	1

Final standings
Group C winner

Team	Pld	W	D	L	GF	GA	GD	Pts
Pakistan Army	3	2	1	0	4	2	+2	7
Civil Aviation Authority	3	1	2	0	8	2	+6	5
PFF Tigers	3	1	1	1	1	1	0	4
Pakistan Railways	3	0	0	3	0	8	−8	0

Opponent
Result
Knockout stage
Opponent
Result
Civil Aviation Authority
1–0
Quarter-finals
Pakistan Navy
2–0 (aet)
WAPDA
1–0
Semi-finals
Khan Research Laboratories
0–0 (aet) (3–1 p.)

== Match ==
=== Details ===
4 August 2019
21:00 PST

Sui Southern	2–3	Pakistan Army
Saadullah 32'; M. Tahir 52'	Report	Abbas 67', 75'; Ali Raza 77'

Tehmas Khan Football Stadium, Peshawar

Sui Southern Gas	Pakistan Army

GK	34	(Pakistan) Saqib Hanif
LWB	20	(Pakistan) Nabi Bux
CB	13	(Pakistan) Ahsan Ullah		(substituted off) 61'
CB	11	(Pakistan) Abdul Salam
CB	4	(Pakistan) Muhammad Naveed		(substituted off) 46'
RWB	3	(Pakistan) Amjad Hussain
LW	27	(Pakistan) Salal Raza
CM	6	(Pakistan) Bilawal-ur-Rehman
CM	17	(Pakistan) Saddam Hussain (c)
RW	23	(Pakistan) Habib-ur-Rehman
CF	10	(Pakistan) Saadullah Khan	32'
Substitutes:
GK	40	(Pakistan) Zubair Ahmed
DF	2	(Pakistan) Hameed Khan
MF	7	(Pakistan) Jadeed Khan
MF	19	(Pakistan) Zakir Lashari
FW	9	(Pakistan) Muhammad Lal
FW	15	(Pakistan) Raziq Mushtaq		(substituted on) 61'
FW	24	(Pakistan) Muhammad Tahir	52'	(substituted on) 46'
Manager:
(Pakistan) Tariq Lutfi

GK	18	(Pakistan) Ahmed Manzoor
RB	3	(Pakistan) Nisar Ahmed
CB	4	(Pakistan) Shahid Iqbal	(yellow card) 35'
CB	5	(Pakistan) Shahbaz Younas
LB	12	(Pakistan) Nauman Saud
DM	7	(Pakistan) Zil Hasnain
CM	8	(Pakistan) Muhammad Afzaal		(substituted off) 60'
CM	21	(Pakistan) Ansar Abbas (c)	67', 75'
RF	17	(Pakistan) Abdul Rehman
CF	23	(Pakistan) Muhammad Jamil
LF	19	(Pakistan) Muhammad Nasir		(substituted off) 46'
Substitutes:
GK	1	(Pakistan) Shahbaz Ahmed
DF	2	(Pakistan) Mir Shiraz-ud-Din
DF	13	(Pakistan) Muhammad Irshad
DF	14	(Pakistan) Muhammad Shahid
MF	15	(Pakistan) Najeeb-ur-Rehman
FW	9	(Pakistan) Ali Raza	77'	(substituted on) 46'
FW	10	(Pakistan) Mohammad Sarfaraz	(yellow card) 66'	(substituted on) 60'
Manager:
(Pakistan) Ghayoor Ali Hamdani

Match rules

- 90 minutes.
- 30 minutes of extra time if necessary.
- Penalty shoot-out if scores still level.
- Seven named substitutes.
- Maximum of three substitutions.
