= 2018 National Challenge Cup final =

2018 National Football Challenge Cup final
- Event: National Challenge Cup
WAPDA	Pakistan Air Force
1	2
- Date: 10 May 2018
- Venue: KPT Football Stadium, Karachi
- Referee: Muhammad Ahmad Rauf
- Attendance: 2,500

The 2018 National Football Challenge Cup final was a football match between Pakistan Air Force and WAPDA played on 10 May 2018 at KPT Football Stadium in Karachi. Pakistan Air Force won their second National Challenge Cup title after having won the first in 2014.

== Road to final ==
WAPDA
Round
Pakistan Air Force
Opponent
Result
Group stage
Opponent
Result
Sui Southern Gas
1–0
Matchday 1
Pakistan Police
2–2
Karachi United
3–0
Matchday 2
State Life
2–0
Group F winner

Team	Pld	W	D	L	GF	GA	GD	Pts
WAPDA	2	2	0	0	4	0	+4	6
Sui Southern Gas	2	1	0	1	2	2	0	3
Karachi United	2	0	0	2	1	5	−4	0

Final standings
Group C winner

Team	Pld	W	D	L	GF	GA	GD	Pts
Pakistan Air Force	2	1	1	0	4	2	+2	4
State Life	2	1	0	1	2	3	–1	3
Pakistan Police	2	0	1	1	3	4	−1	1

Opponent
Result
Knockout stage
Opponent
Result
Pakistan Navy
2–0
Quarter-finals
Pakistan Army
0–0 (aet) (2–4 p.)
Pakistan Petroleum
2–0
Semi-finals
Civil Aviation Authority
1–1 (aet) (4–3 p.)

== Match ==
=== Details ===
10 May 2018
16:00 PST

WAPDA	1–2	Pakistan Airforce
Ahmed 11'	Report	M. Mujahid 32'; Samad Khan 66'

KPT Stadium, Karachi
Attendance: 2,500
Referee: Mohammad Ahmad Rauf

WAPDA	Pakistan Air Force

GK	1	(Pakistan) Muzammil Hussain (c)
RB	4	(Pakistan) Saadat Hussain
CB	5	(Pakistan) Shahram Babar
CB	6	(Pakistan) Muhammad Umar
LB	8	(Pakistan) Muhammad Ahmed	(yellow card) 27'	(substituted off) 71'
CM	15	(Pakistan) Muhammad Bilal
CM	14	(Pakistan) Ali Uzair
RW	7	(Pakistan) Ahmed Faheem	11'
AM	10	(Pakistan) Naeemullah
LW	29	(Pakistan) Adeel Ali
CF	11	(Pakistan) Muhammad Ali
Substitutes:
GK	18	(Pakistan) Bilal Khalid
DF	3	(Pakistan) Mohsin Ali
DF	21	(Pakistan) Arbab Basit
MF	9	(Pakistan) Usman Manzoor		(substituted on) 78'
MF	12	(Pakistan) Muhammad Wasim
MF	13	(Pakistan) Adnan Saeed
MF	20	(Pakistan) Muhammad Khurram		(substituted on) 71'
Manager:
(Pakistan) Muhammad Habib

GK	18	(Pakistan) Ghazanfer Yaseen
RB	3	(Pakistan) Muhammad Asif
CB	4	(Pakistan) Muhammad Sohail
CB	15	(Pakistan) Mehdi Hasan
LB	16	(Pakistan) Muhammad Alam	(yellow card) 22'
DM	8	(Pakistan) Amir Khan		(substituted off) 90+2'
CM	10	(Pakistan) Muhammad Mujahid (c)	32'
CM	17	(Pakistan) Sohail Khan	(yellow card) 10'
RW	19	(Pakistan) Samad Khan	66'	(substituted off) 90+5'
LW	7	(Pakistan) Mansoor Khan
CF	9	(Pakistan) Irfan Ali
Substitutes:
GK	1	(Pakistan) Muhammad Mubashir
DF	13	(Pakistan) Mudassir Wasim
DF	20	(Pakistan) Muhammad Junaid
MF	21	(Pakistan) Abdul Rehman
FW	6	(Pakistan) Salman Khan
FW	11	(Pakistan) Muhammad Zeeshan
Manager:
(Pakistan) Aslam Khan

Assistant referees:2,500
Adnan Anjum
Jahangir Khan
Fourth official:2,500
Mehboob Ali

Match rules

- 90 minutes.
- 30 minutes of extra time if necessary.
- Penalty shoot-out if scores still level.
- Seven named substitutes.
- Maximum of three substitutions.
