= 2019 National Challenge Cup =

Tournament details
- Country: Pakistan
- City: Peshawar
- Venue(s): Tehmas Khan Football Stadium; Qayyum Stadium
- Dates: 19 July 2019 – 4 August 2019
- Teams: 15

Final positions
- Champions: Pakistan Army (3rd title)
- Runners-up: Sui Southern Gas
- Third place: Khan Research Laboratories
- Fourth place: WAPDA

Tournament statistics
- Matches played: 29
- Goals scored: 74 (2.55 per match)
- Top goal scorer: Muhammad Waheed (7 goals)

Awards
- Best player: Saadullah Khan (SSGC)
- Best goalkeeper: Ahmed Manzoor (Pakistan Army)
- All statistics correct as of August 4, 2019.

The 2019 National Challenge Cup was the 28th edition of domestic association football cup competition in Pakistan. 15 teams participated in the competition, commencing from 19 July and concluding on 4 August 2019. The competition was held in Peshawar, with Tehmas Khan Football Stadium and Qayyum Football Stadium hosting all the matches. Pakistan Army defeated Sui Southern Gas by 3-2 to win their third title.

== Teams ==
The following 15 teams participated in the tournament:

- Khan Research Laboratories (PPL)
- Pakistan Airforce (TH)
- PFF Tigers
- Asia Ghee Mills
- Civil Aviation Authority
- Karachi Port Trust
- Karachi United
- National Bank
- Pakistan Army
- Pakistan Navy
- Pakistan Police
- Pakistan Railways
- Pakistan Television
- Sui Southern Gas
- WAPDA

Notes
TH = Challenge Cup title holders; PPL = Pakistan Premier League winners

== Group stage ==
=== Group A ===
Pos	Team	Pld	W	D	L	GF	GA	GD	Pts	Qualification
1	Pakistan Air Force	3	3	0	0	9	0	+9	9	Advance to Knockout round
2	Pakistan Police	3	1	1	1	7	4	+3	4	Advance to Knockout round
3	National Bank	3	1	1	1	4	6	−2	4	
4	Asia Ghee Mills	3	0	0	3	1	11	−10	0	

Updated to match(es) played on 26 July 2019. Source: GSA
19 July 2019
20:00 PST

Pakistan Air Force	4–0	Asia Ghee Mills
Irfan Ali 45'; Mansoor 59' (pen.), 67'; M. Faisal Yaseen 61'	Report

Tehmas Khan Football Stadium, Peshawar
Attendance: 500
20 July 2019
17:00 PST

National Bank	2–2	Pakistan Police
Basit Ali 42'; Maqbool 67'	Report	Tariq 28', 53'

Tehmas Khan Football Stadium, Peshawar
23 July 2019
17:00 PST

Pakistan Air Force	2–0	Pakistan Police
Ali Raza 64', 84'	Report

Tehmas Khan Football Stadium, Peshawar
23 July 2019
20:00 PST

National Bank	2–0	Asia Ghee Mills
Maqbool 20'; Sher Ali 88'	Report

Tehmas Khan Football Stadium, Peshawar
Attendance: 200
26 July 2019
17:00 PST

Pakistan Police	5–0	Asia Ghee Mills
	Report	Jamil 31'; M. Hanif 49'; Yousaf Ali 75', 80'; Nabeel 87'

Qayyum Football Stadium, Peshawar
26 July 2019
17:00 PST

National Bank	0–3	Pakistan Air Force
	Report	Sohail Jr. 47'; M. Faisal Yaseen 90+3'; Mansoor 90+4'

Tehmas Khan Football Stadium, Peshawar

=== Group B ===
Pos	Team	Pld	W	D	L	GF	GA	GD	Pts	Qualification
1	Sui Southern Gas	2	1	1	0	3	2	+1	4	Advance to Knockout round
2	Pakistan Navy	2	1	0	1	3	2	+1	3	Advance to Knockout round
3	Pakistan Television	2	0	1	1	1	3	−2	1	

Updated to match(es) played on 28 July 2019. Source: GSA
21 July 2019
23:00 PST

Pakistan Navy	2–0	Pakistan Television
Awais Gul 66'; Abdurl Rehman 89'	Report

Tehmas Khan Football Stadium, Peshawar
25 July 2019
17:15 PST

Sui Southern Gas	1–1	Pakistan Television
Zain-ul-Abden 58'	Report	Adnan Khan 41'

Tehmas Khan Football Stadium, Peshawar
25 July 2019
17:00PST

Sui Southern Gas	2–1	Pakistan Navy
Saadullah 10'; Zakir Lashari 39'	Report	Farhaullah 73'

Tehmas Khan Football Stadium, Peshawar

=== Group C ===
Pos	Team	Pld	W	D	L	GF	GA	GD	Pts	Qualification
1	Pakistan Army	3	2	1	0	4	2	+2	7	Advance to Knockout round
2	Civil Aviation Authority	3	1	2	0	8	2	+6	5	Advance to Knockout round
3	PFF Tigers	3	0	2	1	1	2	−1	2	
4	Pakistan Railways	3	0	1	2	1	8	−7	1	

Updated to match(es) played on 25 July 2019. Source: GSA
22 July 2019
17:15 PST

Pakistan Army	1–0	PFF Tigers
M. Jamil 90'	Report

Tehmas Khan Football Stadium, Peshawar
Attendance: 500
22 July 2019
20:00 PST

Civil Aviation Authority	6–0	Pakistan Railways
Muhammad Waheed 4', 45+5', 60', 71', 78', 79'	Report

Tehmas Khan Football Stadium, Peshawar
Attendance: 700
25 July 2019
20:00 PST

PFF Tigers	0–0	Civil Aviation Authority
	Report

Qayyum Football Stadium, Peshawar
26 July 2019
17:00 PST

Pakistan Army	1–0	Pakistan Railways
Ali Raza 9'	Report

Tehmas Khan Football Stadium, Peshawar
28 July 2019
17:00 PST

Civil Aviation Authority	2–2	Pakistan Army
Shakeel Ahmed 6'; Muhammad Waheed 62'	Report	M. Nasir 31', 51'

Tehmas Khan Football Stadium, Peshawar
28 July 2019
17:00 PST

Pakistan Railways	1–1	PFF Tigers
M. Saleem 90+2'	Report	Naik Alam 13'

Qayyum Football Stadium, Peshawar

=== Group D ===
Pos	Team	Pld	W	D	L	GF	GA	GD	Pts	Qualification
1	Khan Research Laboratories	3	2	1	0	8	0	+8	7	Advance to Knockout round
2	WAPDA	3	2	1	0	5	0	+5	7	Advance to Knockout round
3	Karachi Port Trust	3	1	0	2	1	8	−7	3	
4	Karachi United	3	0	0	3	0	6	−6	0	

Updated to match(es) played on 24 July 2019. Source: GSA
20 July 2019
20:00 PST

Khan Research Laboratories	3–0	Karachi United
Izharullah 29'; Iftikhar A. Khan 41'; Umair Ali 90+1'	Report

Tehmas Khan Football Stadium, Peshawar
21 July 2019
20:15 PST

WAPDA	3–0	Karachi Port Trust
Zubair Qadeer 10'; Ashfaquddin 23'; Adnan Saeed 57'	Report

Tehmas Khan Football Stadium, Peshawar
24 July 2019
20:00 PST

WAPDA	2–0	Karachi United
Zubair Qadeer 18'; Ashfaquddin 78'	Report

Tehmas Khan Football Stadium, Peshawar
24 July 2019
17:15 PST

Khan Research Laboratories	5–0	Karachi Port Trust
Arslan Ali 17'; Izharullah 29'; Iftikhar A. Khan 39'; Imran Khan 65'; Umair Ali 83'	Report

Tehmas Khan Football Stadium, Peshawar
27 July 2019
17:00 PST

Khan Research Laboratories	0–0	WAPDA
	Report

Tehmas Khan Football Stadium, Peshawar
27 July 2019
17:00 PST

Karachi Port Trust	1–0	Karachi United
Fareed Ahmed 21'	Report

Qayyum Football Stadium, Peshawar

== Knockout round ==
=== Quarter-finals ===
29 July 2019
20:00 PST

Pakistan Air Force	0–3	WAPDA
	Report	Usman Manzoor 29'; Ashfaquddin 32', 75'

Tehmas Khan Football Stadium, Peshawar
30 July 2019
20:00 PST

Sui Southern Gas	1–0	Civil Aviation Authority
Habib-ur-Rehman 34'	Report

Tehmas Khan Football Stadium, Peshawar
31 July 2019
17:00 PST

Khan Research Laboratories	6–1	Pakistan Police
Umair Ali 1', 44', 87'; Zaid Umer 53'; Imran Khan 59'; Zeeshan Siddiqui 80'	Report	M. Yousaf 40'

Tehmas Khan Football Stadium, Peshawar
31 July 2019
20:00 PST

Pakistan Army	2–0 (a.e.t.)	Pakistan Navy
Abbas 101'; Zil Hasnain 113'	Report

Tehmas Khan Football Stadium, Peshawar
Attendance: 2,000

=== Semi-finals ===
1 August 2019
18:00 PST

WAPDA	0–1	Sui Southern Gas
		Hussain 23'

Tehmas Khan Football Stadium, Peshawar
2 August 2019
18:00 PST

Khan Research Laboratories	0–0 (a.e.t.)	Pakistan Army
	Report
Penalties
Umair Ali (penalty scored); Iftikhar A. Khan (penalty missed); Shahid (penalty missed); Ghulam Fareed (penalty missed)	1–3	(penalty scored) Nisar Ahmed; (penalty scored) Najeeb-ur-Rehman; (penalty scored) M. Jamil

Tehmas Khan Football Stadium, Peshawar

=== Third place ===
3 August 2019
21:00 PST

WAPDA	0–1	Khan Research Laboratories
	Report	Umair Ali 90'

Tehmas Khan Football Stadium, Peshawar

== Final ==
=== Details ===
4 August 2019
21:00 PST

Sui Southern Gas	2–3	Pakistan Army
Saadullah 41'; M. Tahir 52'	Report	Abbas 67', 75'; Ali Raza 77'

Tehmas Khan Football Stadium, Peshawar

== Bracket ==
Quarter-finals
29 July – 15:00
Pakistan Air Force	0
WAPDA	3
30 July – 20:00
Sui Southern Gas	1
Civil Aviation Authority	0
31 July – 17:00
Khan Research Laboratories	6
Pakistan Police	1
31 July – 20:00
Pakistan Army (a.e.t.)	2
Pakistan Navy	0

Semi-finals
1 August – 18:00
WAPDA	0
Sui Southern Gas	1
2 August – 18:00
Khan Research Laboratories	0 (1)
Pakistan Army (a.e.t.)(P)	0 (3)

Final
4 August – 21:00
Sui Southern Gas	2
Pakistan Army	3
Third place
3 August – 21:00
WAPDA	0
Khan Research Laboratories	1

== Statistics ==
=== Top goalscorers ===
As of 4 August 2019

Rank	Player	Team	Goals
1	Muhammad Waheed	Civil Aviation Authority	7
2	Umair Ali	Khan Research Laboratories	6
3	Ashfaqquddin Babar	WAPDA	4
4	Mansoor Khan	Pakistan Air Force	3
5	Ali Raza	Pakistan Air Force	2
5	Muhammad Tariq	Pakistan Police	2
5	Iftikhar Ali Khan	Khan Research Laboratories	2
5	Izharullah Khan	Khan Research Laboratories	2
5	Muhammad Nasir	Pakistan Army	2
5	Ali Raza	Pakistan Army	2

=== Clean Sheets ===
As of 4 August 2019

Rank	Player	Team	C
1	Abdul Basit	WAPDA	4
1	Nasrullah	Khan Research Laboratories	4
2	Ghanzafar Yaseen	Pakistan Air Force	3
3	Saqib Hanif	Sui Southern Gas Company	2
4	Murad Khan	PFF Tigers	1
4	Shehroz Ahmed	Pakistan Navy	1
4	Ahmed Manzoor	Pakistan Army	1
4	Sameer Ahmed	Pakistan Civil Aviation Authority	1

=== Awards ===
As of 4 August 2019

Award	Player	Club
Top Scorer	Muhammad Waheed	Civil Aviation Authority
Most Valuable Player	Saadullah Khan	Sui Southern Gas
Best Goalkeeper	Ahmed Manzoor	Pakistan Army
Fair Play	—	Pakistan Air Force
