= 2018–19 SSGC FC season =

Sui Southern Gas
2018–19 season
- Owner: Sui Southern Gas
- Manager: Tariq Lutfi
- Stadium: Benazir Sports Complex
- Pakistan Premier League: 3rd
- National Challenge Cup: Group stage
- Top goalscorer: League: Muhammad Tahir (9 goals); All: Muhammad Tahir (9 goals)
- Highest home attendance: 1,200 (vs. Sui Northern Gas, 11 October 2018, Pakistan Premier League)
- Lowest home attendance: 800 (vs. Karachi United, 22 April 2018, National Challenge Cup)
- Biggest win: 3–0 v Afghan Chaman (8 November 2018); 3–0 v K-Electric (19 December 2019); 3–0 v Pakistan Navy (7 January 2019)
- Biggest defeat: 0–4 v Khan Research Laboratories (13 January 2019)
Home colours
- All statistics correct as of January 13, 2019.

The 2018–19 season was Sui Southern Gas's first season in Pakistan Premier League since 2010–11 after winning one-legged promotion after defeating Gwadar Port Authority 7–1 on 17 September 2019.

== Coaching staff ==
Position	Staff
First-team Manager	(Pakistan) Tariq Lutfi
Assistant Managers	(Pakistan) Shamim Khan
Assistant Managers	(Pakistan) Saeed Asif
Assistant Managers	(Pakistan) Nasim Ahmed
Scout	(Pakistan) Amir Ahmed
Scout	(Pakistan) Aftab Ahmed
Scout	(Pakistan) Sarwar Ali

Source: GSA

=== Other information ===
Owner	(Pakistan) Sui Southern Gas
Ground (capacity and dimensions)	Benazir Sports Complex (20,000 / 100x49 metres)

Source: GSA

=== First team squad ===
As of 13 January 2019.

No.	Name	Nat	Position	Since	Date of birth (age)	Signed from	Games	Goals
Goalkeepers
1	Ahsanullah Ahmed HG^{2} (VC)	(Pakistan)	GK	2014	25 February 1995 (aged 23)	Academy	18	0
30	Saqib Hanif	(Pakistan)	GK	2018	23 April 1994 (aged 24)	(Maldives) B.G. Sports Club	5	0
33	Mehmood Ahmed	(Pakistan)	GK	2018	19 September 1992 (aged 26)	Pakistan Army	0	0
33	Zubair Ahmed U21 HG^{2}	(Pakistan)	GK	2018	16 October 2001 (aged 17)	Academy	4	0
Defenders
3	Amjad Hussain HG^{2}	(Pakistan)	CB / LB	2014	7 March 1994 (aged 24)	Academy	16	0
4	Muhammad Naveed	(Pakistan)	CB	2017	20 January 1992 (aged 26)	(Pakistan) Khan Research Laboratories	23	0
5	Noor Muhammad	(Pakistan)	CB	2016	4 February 1991 (aged 27)	(Pakistan) K-Electric	24	0
11	Abdul Salam HG^{2}	(Pakistan)	RB / LB	2015	6 November 1995 (aged 23)	Academy	14	1
12	Zahid Nadeem HG^{2}	(Pakistan)	LB	2014	23 October 1991 (aged 27)	Academy	12	0
13	Ahsanullah Khan HG^{2}	(Pakistan)	RB	2016	13 December 1992 (aged 26)	(Pakistan) Khan Research Laboratories	20	0
20	Nabi Bux U21 HG^{2}	(Pakistan)	CB	2018	28 August 2000 (aged 18)	Academy	10	0
28	Salal Raza	(Pakistan)	CB	2015	29 December 1995 (aged 23)	(Pakistan) Karachi Port Trust	1	0
55	Aurangzeb	(Pakistan)	CB	2018	1 July 1988 (aged 30)	Free Agent	0	0
Midfielders
6	Bilawal-ur-Rehman	(Pakistan)	CM	2014	2 October 1993 (aged 25)	(Pakistan) Khan Research Laboratories	28	2
7	Jadeed Khan	(Pakistan)	RM	2018	6 January 1989 (aged 30)	(Pakistan) WAPDA	17	1
8	Mehmood Khan	(Pakistan)	CM / AM	2018	10 June 1991 (aged 27)	(Pakistan) K-Electric	14	1
17	Saddam Hussain (C)	(Pakistan)	AM / CM	2018	10 April 1993 (aged 25)	(Northern Cyprus) Gençler Birliği	16	0
19	Zakir Lashari	(Pakistan)	LW / RW	2014	31 August 1991 (aged 27)	(Pakistan) Habib Bank	14	2
26	Ubaid Ahmed U21	(Pakistan)	RW / LW	2018	15 January 2000 (aged 18)	(Pakistan) Habib Bank	18	1
Forwards
9	Muhammad Lal HG^{2}	(Pakistan)	ST	2014	21 September 1990 (aged 28)	Academy	26	12
10	Saadullah Khan	(Pakistan)	ST	2018	4 June 1994 (aged 24)	(Maldives) B.G. Sports Club	10	2
15	Razziq Mushtaq U21 HG^{2}	(Pakistan)	ST	2018	3 October 1999 (aged 19)	Academy	23	1
16	Saeed Ahmed	(Pakistan)	ST	2014	1 February 1990 (aged 28)	(Pakistan) Khan Research Laboratories	12	0
21	Imran Hussain	(Pakistan)	ST	2014	10 March 1981 (aged 37)	Pakistan Army	2	0
22	Amaanullah Ali HG^{2}	(Pakistan)	ST	2014	5 May 1996 (aged 22)	Academy	7	0
23	Habib-ur-Rehman	(Pakistan)	ST	2018	16 February 1996 (aged 22)	(Pakistan) K-Electric	21	5
24	Muhammad Tahir HG^{2}	(Pakistan)	ST	2018	19 January 1995 (aged 23)	Academy	24	9
25	Abdul Naeem U21	(Pakistan)	ST	2018	9 October 1997 (aged 21)	Academy	26	0
27	Shahiryar Lasi U21	(Pakistan)	ST	2018	29 July 2000 (aged 18)	(Pakistan) Karachi Port Trust	5	0

- HG^{2} = Club-trained player
- U21 = Under-21 player

== Competitions ==
=== Overall ===
Competition	Started round	Final position / round	First match	Last match
Pakistan Premier League	—	3rd	28 September 2018	13 January 2019
National Challenge Cup	Group stage	Group stage	22 April 2018	26 April 2018

== Competition record ==
Competition	Record							
Competition	G	W	D	L	GF	GA	GD	Win %
Pakistan Premier League	26	15	5	6	32	16	+16	57.69
National Challenge Cup	2	1	0	1	2	2	+0	50.00
Promotional Play-offs	1	1	0	0	7	1	+6	100.00
Total	29	17	5	7	41	19	+22	58.62

=== Pakistan Premier League ===
==== Table ====
Pos	Team	Pld	W	D	L	GF	GA	GD	Pts
1	Khan Research Laboratories (C)	26	14	9	3	40	12	+28	51
2	Pakistan Airforce	26	14	9	3	40	13	+27	51
3	Sui Southern Gas	26	15	5	6	32	16	+16	50
4	Pakistan Army	26	12	10	4	38	19	+19	46
5	WAPDA	26	13	6	7	32	18	+14	45

Source: Soccerway.com
Rules for classification: 1) points; 2) head-to-head points; 3) head-to-head goal difference; 4) goal difference; 5) number of goals scored; 6) drawing of lots
(C) Champions

==== Matches ====
28 September 2018 1	Civil Aviation Authority	0–0	Sui Southern Gas	Multan
20:00 PST		Report	Bilawal-ur-Rehman (yellow card) 26'	Stadium: Qasim Bagh Stadium; Attendance: 1,500; Referee: Dilawar Khan

2 October 2018 2	Pakistan Army	1–0	Sui Southern Gas	Multan
20:30 PST	Mateen Tariq 61'	Report		Stadium: Qasim Bagh Stadium; Attendance: 1,000; Referee: Adnan Anjum

5 October 2018 3	Sui Southern Gas	0–0	National Bank	Multan
19:30 PST	Noor Muhammad (yellow card) 8'	Report	Akmal Shehzad (yellow card) 58'; Amir Siddique (yellow card) 70'	Stadium: Qasim Bagh Stadium; Attendance: 1,200; Referee: Jahangir Khan

8 October 2018 4	Muslim	0–0	Sui Southern Gas	Multan
20:30 PST		Report		Stadium: Qasim Bagh Stadium; Attendance: 900; Referee: Adnan Anjum

11 October 2018 5	Sui Southern Gas	1–0	Sui Northern Gas	Multan
22:45 PST	Habib-ur-Rehman 90+2'	Report		Stadium: Qasim Bagh Stadium; Attendance: 1,200; Referee: Adnan Anjum

23 October 2018 6	Baloch Nushki	1–3	Sui Southern Gas	Lahore
15:00 PST	Ali Khan 44'; Doulat Khan (yellow card) 74'	Report	Habib-ur-Rehman 45+1'; M. Lal 63', 76'	Stadium: Punjab Stadium; Attendance: 400; Referee: Muzammil Hussain

28 October 2018 7	K-Electric	0–2	Sui Southern Gas	Lahore
16:00 PST	Abayomi Wilson (yellow card) 45'	Report	M. Lal 88'; Mehmood Khan 90+3'	Stadium: Punjab Stadium; Attendance: 1,200; Referee: Adnan Anjum

31 October 2018 8	WAPDA	1–2	Sui Southern Gas	Lahore
15:00 PST	Adnan Saeed 76'	Report	Ahsanullah Khan (yellow card) 22' (yellow-red card) 69'; Habib-ur-Rehman 25'; Razziq Mushtaq 55'	Stadium: Punjab Stadium; Attendance: 500; Referee: Jahangir Khan

3 November 2018 9	Pakistan Air Force	1–0	Sui Southern Gas	Lahore
15:00 PST	Ali Raza (yellow card) 25'; M. Mujahid 49'	Report	Waseem (yellow card) 50'; Iqbal (yellow card) 80'	Stadium: Punjab Stadium; Attendance: 1,200; Referee: Adnan Anjum

8 November 2018 10	Afghan Chaman	0–3	Sui Southern Gas	Lahore
12:30 PST	A. Ali (yellow card) 37'	Report	M. Tahir 59', 83'; M. Lal 65'	Stadium: Punjab Stadium; Referee: Adnan Anjum

17 November 2018 11	Karachi Port Trust	3–2	Sui Southern Gas	Karachi
14:30 PST	M. Waseem 37'; Zubair 67'; M. Jalil 71' (yellow card) 82'; Jasim Ali (yellow card) 90+2'	Report	Razziq Mushtaq (yellow card) 5'; Bilawal-ur-Rehman (yellow card) 28'; M. Tahir 61', 73'	Stadium: KPT Football Stadium; Attendance: 1,500; Referee: Muhammad Ahmad Rauf

23 November 2018 12	Pakistan Navy	0–1	Sui Southern Gas	Karachi
14:30 PST	M. Sumair (yellow card) 46'	Report	M. Tahir 34'	Stadium: Korangi Baloch Stadium; Attendance: Korangi Baloch Stadium

26 November 2018 13	Sui Southern Gas	1–0	Khan Research Laboratories	Karachi
15:00 PST	Habib-ur-Rehman 13'; Saddam (yellow card) 59'	Report	Shahid (yellow card) 88'	Stadium: KMC Football Stadium; Referee: Jahangir Khan

29 November 2018 14	Sui Southern Gas	1–1	Civil Aviation Authority	Karachi
12:00 PST	M. Lal 27'	Report	M. Bilal 13'; Saeed A. Aziz 90+2'	Stadium: Korangi Baloch Stadium; Referee: Adnan Anjum

2 December 2018 15	Sui Southern Gas	0–0	Pakistan Army	Karachi
15:00 PST	Habib-ur-Rehman (yellow card) 51'; M. Naveed (yellow card) 84'	Report	Zahid Naveed (yellow card) 85'	Stadium: KMC Football Stadium

5 December 2018 16	National Bank	1–0	Sui Southern Gas	Karachi
12:00 PST	Misbah-ul-Hassan (yellow card) 63'; Basit Ali 65'			Stadium: KPT Football Stadium; Referee: Adnan Anjum

8 December 2018 17	Sui Southern Gas	2–0	Muslim	Karachi
12:00 PST	M. Lal 85'; Bilawal-ur-Rehman 90+3'	Report		Stadium: KPT Football Stadium; Referee: Adnan Anjum

12 December 2018 18	Sui Northern Gas	1–2	Sui Southern Gas	Karachi
15:00 PST	M. Imran Lallu (yellow card) 27'; Sada Bahar 45+1'	Report	M. Tahir 25', 44'	Stadium: Korangi Baloch Stadium; Referee: Jahangir Khan

16 December 2018 19	Sui Southern Gas	1–0	Baloch Nushki	Karachi
15:00 PST	M. Lal 53'	Report	M. Ibrahim (yellow card) 73'	Stadium: KPT Football Stadium; Referee: Muzammil Hussain

19 December 2018 20	Sui Southern Gas	3–0	K-Electric	Karachi
13:00 PST	Bilawal-ur-Rehman 35'; Jadeed 44'; A. Salam 61'	Report		Stadium: Korangi Baloch Stadium; Attendance: 1,000; Referee: Muhammad Ahmad Rauf

23 December 2018 21	Sui Southern Gas	1–0	WAPDA	Karachi
12:00 PST	Amjad Hussain (yellow card) 12'; Nabi Bux (yellow card) 40'; Ubaid Ahmed 42'	Report	M. Shahbaz (yellow card) 19'; Ahmed (yellow card) 45'; Shahram Babar (yellow card) 52'	Stadium: KPT Football Club; Attendance: 1,200

26 December 2018 22	Sui Southern Gas	1–2	Pakistan Air Force	Karachi
13:00 PST	M. Tahir 29'	Report	M. Mujahid 20'; Mansoor 27'; Ali Raza (yellow card) 28'; M. Sufyan Asif (yellow card) 80'	Stadium: KPT Football Club; Referee: Ahmed Lal

30 December 2018 23	Sui Southern Gas	2–0	Afghan Chaman	Karachi
13:00 PST	Habib-ur-Rehman 27'; M. Tahir 64'	Report	Khan Jr. (yellow card) 82'	Stadium: Korangi Baloch Stadium; Referee: Adnan Anjum

2 January 2019 24	Sui Southern Gas	1–0	Karachi Port Trust	Karachi
13:00 PST	M. Lal 53'; Amjad Hussain (yellow card) 53'	Report		Stadium: KMC Football Stadium; Referee: Hidayatullah

7 January 2019 25	Sui Southern Gas	3–0	Pakistan Navy	Karachi
15:00 PST	Saadullah (yellow card) 46' (goal) 50', 78'; Zakir Lashari 79'	Report	Shahid Munir (yellow card) 27'; Rana Zafaryab (yellow card) 45+1'	Stadium: KPT Football Stadium; Referee: Muhammad Anwar

13 January 2019 26	Khan Research Laboratories	4–0	Sui Southern Gas	Karachi
14:30 PST	Iftikhar A. Khan 10'; Izharullah 20', 51'; Junaid Ahmed 26'; Mazdaq Masood (yellow card) 30'	Report	Nabi Bux (yellow card) 24'	Stadium: KPT Football Stadium; Attendance: 15,000; Referee: Hidayatullah

=== National Challenge Cup ===
==== Table ====
Pos	Team	Pld	W	D	L	GF	GA	GD	Pts	Qualification
1	WAPDA	2	2	0	0	4	0	+4	6	Advance to Knockout round
2	Sui Southern Gas	2	1	0	1	2	2	0	3	
3	Karachi United	2	0	0	2	1	5	−4	0	

Updated to match(es) played on 21 April 2018. Source:

22 April 2018 Group stage	WAPDA	1–0	Sui Southern Gas	Karachi
17:00 PST	M. Ali 56'; Shahram Babar (yellow card) 84'	Report	M. Tahir (yellow card) 63'; A. Salam (yellow card) 79'	Stadium: KPT Football Stadium; Attendance: 2,500; Referee: Jahangir Khan

26 April 2018 Group stage	Sui Southern Gas	2–1	Karachi United	Karachi
16:30 PST	Bilawal-ur-Rehman 24'; A. Naeem (yellow card) 30' (goal) 72'; Noor Mohammad (yellow card) 39'	Report	Fazal Muhammad 39'	Stadium: KPT Football Stadium; Attendance: 800; Referee: Mohammad Ahmad Rauf

== Squad statistics ==
=== Appearances and goals ===
As of 13 January 2019

No.	Pos	Nat	Player	Total		Premier League		National Challenge Cup	
No.	Pos	Nat	Player	Apps	Goals	Apps	Goals	Apps	Goals
1	GK	(Pakistan) PAK	Ahsan Ullah	18	0	16+0	0	2+0	0
3	DF	(Pakistan) PAK	Amjad Hussain	12	0	12+0	0	0+0	0
4	DF	(Pakistan) PAK	Muhammad Naveed	25	0	23+0	0	2+0	0
5	DF	(Pakistan) PAK	Noor Muhammad	26	0	24+0	0	2+0	0
6	MF	(Pakistan) PAK	Bilawal-ur-Rehman	27	3	24+1	2	2+0	1
7	MF	(Pakistan) PAK	Jadeed Khan	22	1	17+4	1	1+0	0
8	MF	(Pakistan) PAK	Mehmood Khan	20	1	14+4	1	2	0
9	FW	(Pakistan) PAK	Muhammad Lal	28	8	21+5	8	2+0	0
10	FW	(Pakistan) PAK	Saadullah Khan	15	2	10+4	2	1+0	0
11	DF	(Pakistan) PAK	Abdul Salam	22	1	14+6	1	2+0	0
12	DF	(Pakistan) PAK	Zahid Nadeem	13	0	9+3	0	1+0	0
13	DF	(Pakistan) PAK	Ahsanullah Khan	23	0	20+1	0	2+0	0
15	FW	(Pakistan) PAK	Razziq Mushtaq	25	1	16+7	1	0+2	0
16	FW	(Pakistan) PAK	Saeed Ahmed	12	0	7+5	0	0+0	0
17	MF	(Pakistan) PAK	Saddam Hussain	16	0	16+0	0	0+0	0
19	FW	(Pakistan) PAK	Zakir Lashari	18	1	9+7	1	1+1	0
20	DF	(Pakistan) PAK	Nabi Bux	13	0	10+3	0	0+0	0
21	FW	(Pakistan) PAK	Imran Hussain	4	0	2+2	0	0+0	0
22	FW	(Pakistan) PAK	Amaanullah	7	0	7+0	0	0+0	0
23	FW	(Pakistan) PAK	Habib-ur-Rehman	23	5	19+2	5	1+1	0
24	FW	(Pakistan) PAK	Muhammad Tahir	26	9	24+0	9	2+0	0
25	FW	(Pakistan) PAK	Abdul Naeem	27	1	14+12	0	1+0	1
26	MF	(Pakistan) PAK	Ubaid Ahmed	26	1	18+6	1	1+1	0
27	FW	(Pakistan) PAK	Shahriyar Lasi	5	0	4+1	0	0+0	0
28	DF	(Pakistan) PAK	Salal Raza	1	0	1+0	0	0+0	0
30	GK	(Pakistan) PAK	Saqib Hanif	5	0	5+0	0	0+0	0
33	GK	(Pakistan) PAK	Mehmood Ahmed	1	0	1+0	0	0+0	0
40	GK	(Pakistan) PAK	Zubair Ahmed	4	0	4+0	0	0+0	0
55	DF	(Pakistan) PAK	Aurangzeb	0	0	0+0	0	0+0	0

- Source: GSA

=== Disciplinary record ===
Number	Nationality	Position	Name	Pakistan Premier League		National Challenge Cup		Total	
Number	Nationality	Position	Name	Booked	Sent off (straight red)	Booked	Sent off (straight red)	Booked	Sent off (straight red)
13	(Pakistan)	DF	Ahsanullah Khan	2	1	0	0	2	1
3	(Pakistan)	DF	Amjad Hussain	2	0	0	0	2	0
20	(Pakistan)	DF	Nabi Bux	2	0	0	0	2	0
6	(Pakistan)	MF	Bilawal-ur-Rehman	2	0	0	0	2	0
5	(Pakistan)	DF	Noor Muhammad	1	0	1	0	2	0
4	(Pakistan)	DF	Muhammad Naveed	1	0	0	0	1	0
17	(Pakistan)	MF	Saddam Hussain	1	0	0	0	1	0
10	(Pakistan)	FW	Saadullah Khan	1	0	0	0	1	0
15	(Pakistan)	FW	Razziq Mushtaq	1	0	0	0	1	0
23	(Pakistan)	FW	Habib-ur-Rehman	1	0	0	0	1	0
11	(Pakistan)	DF	Abdul Salam	0	0	1	0	1	0
24	(Pakistan)	FW	Muhammad Tahir	0	0	1	0	1	0
11	(Pakistan)	FW	Abdul Naeem	0	0	1	0	1	0
			TOTALS	14	1	4	0	18	1

=== Top scorers ===
Place	Position	Nationality	Number	Name	Pakistan Premier League	National Challenge Cup	Total
1	FW	(Pakistan)	24	Muhammad Tahir	9	0	9
2	FW	(Pakistan)	9	Muhammad Lal	8	0	8
3	FW	(Pakistan)	23	Habib-ur-Rehman	5	0	5
4	MF	(Pakistan)	6	Bilawal-ur-Rehman	2	1	3
5	FW	(Pakistan)	10	Saadullah Khan	2	0	2
6	FW	(Pakistan)	7	Jadeed Khan	1	0	1
6	MF	(Pakistan)	8	Mehmood Khan	1	0	1
6	DF	(Pakistan)	11	Abdul Salam	1	0	1
6	FW	(Pakistan)	15	Razziq Mushtaq	1	0	1
6	FW	(Pakistan)	19	Zakir Lashari	1	0	1
6	MF	(Pakistan)	26	Ubaid Ahmed	1	0	1
6	FW	(Pakistan)	25	Abdul Naeem	0	1	1
TOTALS					32	2	34

=== Captains ===
No.	P	Name	Country	No. games	Notes
17	MF	Saddam Hussain	(Pakistan)	16	Club captain
1	GK	Ahsan Ullah	(Pakistan)	10	Club vice captain
6	MF	Bilawal-ur-Rehman	(Pakistan)	2	3rd captain

Last updated: 13 January 2019
Source: Competitive match reports.
Competitive matches only
Matches started as captain only
Country: FIFA nationality; No.: Squad number; P: Position; Name: Player name; No. Games: Number of games started as captain.
