= 2016 Pakistan Football Federation Cup =

2016 National Football Challenge Cup
Pakistan Football Federation Cup

Tournament details
- Country: Pakistan
- Cities: Islamabad; Lahore; Karachi
- Dates: 28 January 2016 – 6 February 2016 (qualifying competition); 9 February 2016 – 22 February 2016 (main competition)
- Teams: 24 (overall); 16 (qualifying competition); 8 (main competition)

Final positions
- Champions: Khan Research Laboratories (6th title)
- Runners-up: National Bank
- Third place: Pakistan Air Force
- Fourth place: Pakistan Army

Tournament statistics
- Matches played: 50
- Goals scored: 116 (2.32 per match)
- Top goal scorer: Fazal (6 goals)

Awards
- Best player Best goalkeeper: Mansoor Khan (Pakistan Air Force); Saqib Hanif (Khan Research Laboratories)

The 2016 National Football Challenge Cup or 2016 Pakistan Football Federation Cup was the 26th season of domestic association football cup tournament in Pakistani football. 24 teams took part in this competition held in Islamabad, Lahore, and Karachi from 28 January 2016 to 22 February 2016.

Reigning champions Khan Research Laboratories successfully defended their title after defeating National Bank 1–0 in the final.

== Background ==
After eight months of no football action, the tournament was announced for 28 January 2016 to 23 February 2016. The PFF Cup, instead of the usual National Challenge Cup, was organised by the Lahore High Court appointed PFF administrator Justice Asad Munir. The National Challenge Cup scheduled for April 2016 was later called off due to lack of sponsorship, leaving the PFF Cup as the only national knockout event that year.

== Format ==
=== Qualifying round ===
For qualification, 15 teams from PFF League (B Division) and 1 team from the Pakistan Premier League played in a group stage, with winners and runners-up from each group qualifying for the final round.

=== Final round ===
Eight teams from the qualifying round and eight teams from the Pakistan Premier League played in a group stage, with the group winners and runners-up qualifying for the knock-out stages.

== Teams ==
Final Round the 8 Teams from PPL.	Qualifying Round the 15 teams from PFF League, 1 from PPL
Khan Research Laboratories; WAPDA; Pakistan Army; National Bank; Pakistan Air Force; Karachi Port Trust; Pakistan Navy; Pakistan Airlines (withdrew)	Pakistan Railways; Sui Southern Gas Company; Ashraf Sugar Mills; Social Welfare; Pakistan Steel; Gwadar Port Authority; Sindh Government Press; Pakistan Police; Karachi United; Saif Textiles; Falcon Company; Insaf Afghan Goods Trading Company; Higher Education Commission; Pakistan Television; Bhatti United; SNGPL

1. A:
2. K Electric
3. 2016 AFC Cup
4. Al Hidd
5. Sindh Social Welfare Trust withdrew without playing a match

== Qualifying round ==
=== Group I ===
Pos	Team	Pld	W	D	L	GF	GA	GD	Pts	Qualification
1	Sui Southern Gas	2	2	0	0	4	2	+2	6	Advance to Final Round
2	Ashraf Sugar Mills	2	1	0	1	7	2	+5	3	Advance to Final Round
3	Pakistan Steel	2	0	0	2	1	8	−7	0	

Updated to match(es) played on 31 January 2016. Source: PFF
- All Matches played in Karachi
28 January 2016
15:00 (UTC+5)

Sui Southern Gas	Not Held	Social Welfare
	Report

KPT Stadium, Karachi
28 January 2016
15:00 (UTC+5)

Ashraf Sugar Mills	6–0	Pakistan Steel
M. Bilal 20', 55', 67'; Imran Ali 50'; M. Imran 53'; Kashif Amin 85'

KMC Stadium, Karachi

30 January 2016
15:00 (UTC+5)

Sui Southern Gas	2–1	Pakistan Steel
Ahmed 25'; Zahid Nadeem (red card) 51'; Abdus Salam 71'		Nasir Ahmed 17'; Amjad Hussain (yellow card) 44'

KMC Stadium, Karachi
Referee: Younas Lal
30 January 2016
15:00(UTC+5)

Ashraf Sugar Mills	Not Held	Social Welfare
	Report

1 February 2016
15:00 (UTC+5)

Pakistan Steel	Not Held	Social Welfare
	Report

1 February 2016
15:00 (UTC+5)

Sui Southern Gas	2–1	Ashraf Sugar Mills
Saadullah (45+1); M. Lal 77'		Zeshan Rafiq 79'

KMC Stadium, Karachi

=== Group II ===
Pos	Team	Pld	W	D	L	GF	GA	GD	Pts	Qualification
1	Karachi United	3	2	1	0	10	3	+7	7	Advance to Final Round
2	Pakistan Police	3	1	1	1	6	6	0	4	Advance to Final Round
3	Gwadar Port Authority	2	1	0	1	5	6	−1	3	
4	Sindh Government Press	3	1	0	2	4	7	−3	3	

Updated to match(es) played on 2 February 2016. Source: PFF
- All Matches played in Karachi
29 January 2016
15:00 (UTC+5)

Gwadar Port Authority	1–4	Karachi United
Pehchan 51'		Fazal 5', 32'; Asif Khan 24', 41'

KPT Stadium, Karachi
Referee: Younas Lal
29 January 2016
15:00 (UTC+5)

Sindh Government Press	1–2	Pakistan Police
M. Waqas 45+1'; Mohammad (red card) 90+1'		Sher Hassan 22'; Zakir Ullah 71'; M. Naeem (yellow card)

KMC Stadium, Karachi
Referee: Habibullah

31 January 2016
15:00 (UTC+5)

Gwadar Port Authority	3–2	Pakistan Police
Mian 24'; Pehchan 75'; Wahid 90+5'		Hassan 43'; Zaman 90'

KMC Stadium, Karachi
31 January 2016
15:00 (UTC+5)

Karachi United	4–0	Sindh Government Press
Ali Raza 10'; Fazal 21'; M.Junaid 73'; A.Usman 75'

KPT Stadium, Karachi

2 February 2016
15:00 (UTC+5)

Karachi United	2–2	Pakistan Police
Noman 16'; Asif Khan 42'		Hassan 75'; Monibullah 85'

KPT Stadium, Karachi
2 February 2016
15:00 (UTC+5)

Gwadar Port Authority	1–3	Sindh Government Press
Shahnawaz 62'		Zohaib 12'; Dodo 33', 48'

KMC Stadium, Karachi

=== Group III ===
Pos	Team	Pld	W	D	L	GF	GA	GD	Pts	Qualification
1	Pakistan Railways	3	2	1	0	5	0	+5	7	Advance to Final Round
2	Saif Textiles	3	1	2	0	1	0	+1	5	Advance to Final Round
3	Falcon Company	3	0	2	1	0	1	−1	2	
4	Insaf Afghan Goods Trading Company	3	0	1	2	0	5	−5	1	

Updated to match(es) played on 6 February 2016. Source: PFF
- All Matches played in Lahore
1 February 2016
11:45 (UTC+5)

Pakistan Railways	4–0	Insaf Afghan Goods Trading Company
M.Asim 26', 72', 77'; Umer Zafar 47'

Fame Club Ground, Lahore
1 February 2016
14:30 (UTC+5)

Saif Textile	0–0	Falcon Company

Fame Club Ground, Lahore

3 February 2016
14:30 (UTC+5)

Pakistan Railways	1–0	Falcon Company
M.Asim 70'

Fame Club Ground, Lahore
3 February 2016
14:30 (UTC+5)

Saif Textile	1–0	Insaf Afghan Goods Trading Company
Virk 34'

Fame Club Ground, Lahore

5 February 2016
14:30 (UTC+5)

Falcon Company	0–0	Insaf Afghan Goods Trading Company

Fame Club Ground, Lahore
5 February 2016
14:30 (UTC+5)

Pakistan Railways	0–0	Saif Textile

Fame Club Ground, Lahore

=== Group IV ===
Pos	Team	Pld	W	D	L	GF	GA	GD	Pts	Qualification
1	Sui Northern Gas	3	2	1	0	6	1	+5	7	Advance to Final Round
2	Bhatti United	3	1	2	0	3	0	+3	5	Advance to Final Round
3	Higher Education Commission	2	1	0	1	2	6	−4	3	
4	Pakistan Television	2	0	1	1	0	4	−4	1	

Updated to match(es) played on 6 February 2016. Source: PFF
- All Matches played in Islamabad
31 January 2016
14:30 (UTC+5)

Higher Education Commission	1–3	Sui Northern Gas
Danial 35'		Mehmood 5'; Bahar 54'; Farooq 90'

Jinnah Sports Stadium, Islamabad
31 January 2016
12:00 (UTC+5)

Pakistan Television	0–0	Bhatti United

Jinnah Sports Stadium, Islamabad

2 February 2016
14:30 (UTC+5)

Higher Education Commission	0–3	Bhatti United
		Bahar; Owais; Nadeem

Jinnah Sports Stadium, Islamabad
2 February 2016
14:30 (UTC+5)

Pakistan Television	0–3	Sui Northern Gas
		Latif (2); Munir

Jinnah Sports Stadium, Islamabad

4 February 2016
14:30 (UTC+5)

Bhatti United	0–0	Sui Northern Gas

Jinnah Sports Stadium, Islamabad
4 February 2016
14:30 (UTC+5)

Pakistan Television	0–1	Higher Education Commission
		Ashraf

Jinnah Sports Stadium, Islamabad

== Group stage ==
=== Group A ===
Pos	Team	Pld	W	D	L	GF	GA	GD	Pts	Qualification
1	Pakistan Army	3	3	0	0	8	2	+6	9	Knockout stage
2	Karachi United	3	2	0	1	5	4	+1	6	Knockout stage
3	Karachi Port Trust	3	1	0	2	4	5	−1	3	
4	Saif Textile	3	0	0	3	4	10	−6	0	

Updated to match(es) played on 10 February 2016. Source:
9 February 2016
11:30 (UTC+5)

Pakistan Army	4–1	Saif Textile
Sarfaraz 28', 82'; Nisar 58'; Zahid 60'		Waqas 86'

Fame Club Ground, Lahore
9 February 2016
11:30 (UTC+5)

Karachi Port Trust	0 - 2	Karachi United
		Fazal 44', 54'

Faisal Town Football Ground, Lahore

11 February 2016
14:30 (UTC+5)

Pakistan Army	2 - 0	Karachi United
Najeeb 3'; Ansar Abbas 73'

Faisal Town Football Ground, Lahore
11 February 2016
14:30 (UTC+5)

Karachi Port Trust	3 - 1	Saif Textile
M.Jalil 2'; Qadir 70'; Shamir Taj 90+1'		Ali Raza 45'

Fame Club Ground, Lahore

13 February 2016
11:30 (UTC+5)

Karachi United	3 - 2	Saif Textile
Ali Reza 18'; Fazal 50'; Baloch 72'		Virk 45'; Waqas Ali 64'

Fame Club Ground, Lahore
13 February 2016
11:30 (UTC+5)

Pakistan Army	2 - 1	Karachi Port Trust
Ansar Abbas 24'; Rasool 86'		Baloch 27'

Faisal Town Football Ground, Lahore

=== Group B ===
Pos	Team	Pld	W	D	L	GF	GA	GD	Pts	Qualification
1	Sui Southern Gas	3	2	1	0	4	2	+2	7	Knockout stage
2	WAPDA	3	2	0	1	7	3	+4	6	Knockout stage
3	Pakistan Police	3	1	0	2	3	3	0	3	
4	Pakistan Navy	3	0	1	2	1	7	−6	1	

Updated to match(es) played on 13 February. Source:
10 February 2016
14:30 (UTC+5)

WAPDA	1 - 0	Pakistan Police
Ahsan 4'

Faisal Town Football Ground, Lahore
10 February 2016
14:30 (UTC+5)

Pakistan Navy	0 - 0	Sui Southern Gas

Fame Club Ground, Lahore

12 February 2016
11:30 (UTC+5)

WAPDA	1 - 2	Sui Southern Gas
Hasnain 3'		Saadullah 78'; Abdus Salam 86'

Faisal Town Football Stadium, Lahore
12 February 2016
11:30 (UTC+5)

Pakistan Navy	0 - 2	Pakistan Police
		Izharullah 68'; M.Naveed 76'

Fame Club Ground, Lahore

14 February 2016
14:30 (UTC+5)

Sui Southern Gas	2 - 1	Pakistan Police
Abdul Salam 7'; Saadullah 73'		Umair 14'

Fame Club Ground, Lahore
14 February 2016
14:30 (UTC+5)

WAPDA	5 - 1	Pakistan Navy
Jadeed Khan 12', 74', 86'; 57', 64'		Mohsin 72'

Faisal Town Football Stadium, Lahore

=== Group C ===
Pos	Team	Pld	W	D	L	GF	GA	GD	Pts	Qualification
1	Khan Research Laboratories	3	3	0	0	6	1	+5	9	Knockout stage
2	National Bank	3	2	0	1	3	2	+1	6	Knockout stage
3	Sui Northern Gas	3	1	0	2	1	2	−1	3	
4	Ashraf Sugar Mills	3	0	0	3	0	5	−5	0	

Updated to match(es) played on 13 February. Source:
10 February 2016
11:30 (UTC+5)

Khan Research Laboratories	3 - 0	Ashraf Sugar Mills
Adil 79'; M.Hanif 86'; M.Salman 90'

Faisal Town Football Ground, Lahore
10 February 2016
11:30 (UTC+5)

National Bank	1 - 0	Sui Northern Gas
Maqbool 57'

Fame Club Ground, Lahore

12 February 2016
14:30 (UTC+5)

Khan Research Laboratories	1 - 0	Sui Northern Gas
Murtaza 50'

Faisal Town Football Ground, Lahore
12 February 2016
14:30 (UTC+5)

National Bank	1 - 0	Ashraf Sugar Mills
J.Hamza 42'

Fame Club Ground, Lahore

14 February 2016
11:30 (UTC+5)

Sui Northern Gas	1 - 0	Ashraf Sugar Mills
Farooq 52'

Fame Club Ground, Lahore
14 February 2016
11:30 (UTC+5)

Khan Research Laboratories	2 - 1	National Bank
Murtaza 10'; Y.Afridi 21'		Sher Ali Khan 81'

Faisal Town Football Ground, Lahore

=== Group D ===
Pos	Team	Pld	W	D	L	GF	GA	GD	Pts	Qualification
1	Pakistan Air Force	2	2	0	0	4	1	+3	6	Knockout stage
2	Bhatti United	2	0	1	1	1	2	−1	1	Knockout stage
3	Pakistan Railways	2	0	1	1	1	2	−1	1	

First match(es) will be played: 9 February 2016. Source:
9 February 2016
14:30 (UTC+5)

Pakistan Air Force	2 - 1	Bhatti United
Salman 33'; Arif 71'		Latif 34'

Faisal Town Football Ground, Lahore
11 February 2016
11:30 (UTC+5)

Pakistan Air Force	2 - 1	Pakistan Railways
Mansoor 28'; Sohail Jr. 45'		Wajid 51'

Faisal Town Football Ground, Lahore

13 February 2016
14:30 (UTC+5)

Pakistan Railways	0 - 0	Bhatti United

Faisal Town Football Ground, Lahore

=== Quarterfinals ===
15 February 2016
14:00 (UTC+5)

Pakistan Army	1 - 0	Bhatti United
Ansar Abbas 85'

Faisal Town Football Ground, Lahore
Referee: Habibullah

16 February 2016
14:00 (UTC+5)

PAF F.C.	1 - 0	Karachi United
M.Mujahid 73'

Faisal Town Football Ground, Lahore

17 February 2016
14:00 (UTC+5)

Sui Southern Gas	0 - 0	National Bank
Penalties
	2 - 3

Fame Club Ground, Lahore

18 February 2016
14:00 (UTC+5)

Khan Research Laboratories	3 - 1	WAPDA
Hanif 21'; M.Adil 52'; M.Shahid 89'		Arif 82'

Faisal Town Football Ground, Lahore

=== Semifinals ===
20 February 2016
11:00 (UTC+5)

Khan Research Laboratories	0 - 0	Pakistan Air Force
Penalties
	4 - 3

Punjab Stadium, Lahore

20 February 2016
14:00 (UTC+5)

National Bank	1 - 0	Pakistan Army
M.Maqbool 6'

Punjab Stadium, Lahore

=== Third place match ===
21 February 2016

Pakistan Air Force	2 - 0	Pakistan Army
Irfan 42', 66'

Punjab Stadium, Lahore

=== Final ===
22 February 2016

Khan Research Laboratories	1 - 0	National Bank
M.Ahmed 75'

Punjab Stadium, Lahore

== Knockout round ==
=== Bracket ===
Quarter Final
C1	Khan Research Laboratories	3
B2	WAPDA	1
D1	Pakistan Air Force	1
A2	Karachi United	0
B1	Sui Southern Gas	0 (2)
C2	National Bank	0 (3)
A1	Pakistan Army	1
D2	Bhatti United	0

Semi Final
C1	Khan Research Laboratories	0 (4)
D1	Pakistan Air Force	0 (3)
C2	National Bank	1
A1	Pakistan Army	0

Final
C1	Khan Research Laboratories	1
C2	National Bank	0
Third place
D1	Pakistan Air Force	2
A1	Pakistan Army	0

== Top scorer ==
Rank	Player	Club	Goals
1	(Pakistan) Fazal	Karachi United	6
2	(Pakistan) Jadeed Khan	WAPDA	5
3	(Pakistan) M. Bilal	Ashraf Sugar Mills	3
3	(Pakistan) Saadullah Khan	Sui Southern Gas	3
3	(Pakistan) Asif Khan	Karachi United	3
3	(Pakistan) Abdus Salam	Sui Southern Gas	3
4	(Pakistan) Pehchan	Gwadar Port Authority	2

== Prize fund ==
Prize money for 2016 PFF Cup.
Teams

Achieved round	Premium per team	Summed bonuses
Third Place	Rs.100,000	
Finals	Rs.200,000	
Champion	Rs.100,000	Rs.300,000

Fair Play, Best Players and Referees

Type	Money
Fair-play Trophy Winner	Rs.50,000
Top Goalscorer	Rs.25,000
Best Player	Rs.25,000
Best Goalkeeper	Rs.25,000
Best Referee	Rs.15,000
Best Assistant Referee	Rs.10,000
