= 2014 PFF League =

Football Federation League
- Season: 2014
- Dates: 24 November 2014 – 27 December 2014
- Champions: Pakistan Navy
- Promoted: Pakistan Navy; Baloch Nushki
- Matches: 44
- Goals: 98 (2.23 per match)
- Top goalscorer: Saadullah Khan (6 goals)
- Biggest home win: Pakistan Navy 5–0 Pakistan Television (5 December 2014)
- Biggest away win: Gwadar Port Authority 2–6 Higher Education Commission (14 December 2015)
- Highest scoring: Gwadar Port Authority 2–6 Higher Education Commission (14 December 2015)
- Longest winning run: 7 games Pakistan Navy
- Longest unbeaten run: 7 games Pakistan Navy
- Highest attendance: 10,032; Lyallpur 0–0 Baloch Nushki (24 December 2014)
- Lowest attendance: 233; Bhatti United 1–2 Saif Textiles (10 December 2014)
- Total attendance: 73,478
- Average attendance: 1,669
- All statistics correct as of December 27, 2014.

The 2014 PFF League (PFFL) was the 11th season of the second tier of Pakistani football league system. The season started on 27 November 2014 and concluded on 27 December 2014.

== Teams ==
A total of 30 teams contested the league. 21 teams played via departmental route and 9 played from club route.

=== Relegation (pre-season) ===
A total of 6 teams were relegated from 2013–14 Pakistan Premier League (first tier), and therefore, joined the 2014 PFF League.

Teams relegated from the 2013–14 Pakistan Premier League

- Baloch Nushki
- Habib Bank
- Lyallpur
- Pakistan Navy
- Pak Afghan Clearing
- Zarai Taraqiati

=== Teams ===
Club Phase	Departmental Phase
Alamo Muhammadan; Baloch Nushki; Baloch Dalbandin; Huma FC; Young Ittefaq; Lyallpur; Milli Afghan; Mardan Blue Star; Atish Tank	Pakistan Public Work Department; Sui Southern Gas; Ashraf Sugar Mills; Higher Education Commission; Pak Afghan Clearing; Karachi United; Habib Bank; Gwadar Port Authority; Batti United; Saif Textiles; Pakistan Navy; Pakistan Steel; Pakistan Police; Insaf Afghan Goods; Falcon Company; Sindh Government Press; Aqua Water Company; Sui Northern Gas; Social Welfare; Hazara Coal Company; Pakistan Television

== Club phase ==
=== Group stages ===
==== Group A ====
Pos	Team	Pld	W	D	L	GF	GA	GD	Pts	Qualification
1	Lyallpur	2	2	0	0	5	0	+5	6	Advance to Final stage
2	Huma FC	2	1	0	1	3	2	+1	3	
3	Mardan Blue Star	2	0	0	2	1	7	−6	0	

Updated to match(es) played on 6 December 2014. Source: GSA
1 December 2014
14:00 PST

Lyallpur	4–0	Mardan Blue Star
M. Touseef 2', 42'; Naeemullah 3'; Rizwan Safdar 21'	Report

Attendance: 1,298
Referee: Muhammad Shafaat Habib
4 December 2014
14:00 PST

Huma FC	3–1	Mardan Blue Star
Nasir Jameel 18'; Ali Khan Niazi 44', 90'	Report	Din Badshah 8'

Attendance: 400
Referee: Muhammad Shafaat Habib
6 December 2014
15:00 PST

Lyallpur	1–0	Huma FC
M. Touseef 45'	Report

Attendance: 900
Referee: Muhammad Ali

==== Group B ====
Pos	Team	Pld	W	D	L	GF	GA	GD	Pts	Qualification
1	Baloch Nushki	2	2	0	0	3	0	+3	6	Advance to Final stage
2	Young Ittefaq	2	1	0	1	2	3	−1	3	
3	Atish Tank	2	0	0	2	1	3	−2	0	

Updated to match(es) played on 6 December 2014. Source: GSA
1 December 2014
15:00 PST

Baloch Nushki	2–0	Young Ittefaq
M. Rafique 75'; Sanaullah 90+3'	Report

Attendance: 575
Referee: Dilawar Khan
3 December 2014
15:00 PST

Young Ittefaq	2–1	Atish Tank
Allauddin 64'; Ahmedullah 78'	Report	Imtiaz Khan 10'

Attendance: 835
Referee: Jahangir Khan
5 December 2014
15:00 PST

Baloch Nushki	1–0	Atish Tank
Shahbaz Khan 50'	Report

Attendance: 1,025
Referee: Dilawar Khan

==== Group C ====
Pos	Team	Pld	W	D	L	GF	GA	GD	Pts	Qualification
1	Alamo Muhammadan	2	2	0	0	4	0	+4	6	Advance to Final stage
2	Baloch Dalbandin	2	1	0	1	3	2	+1	3	
3	Milli Afghan	2	0	0	2	0	5	−5	0	

Updated to match(es) played on 6 December 2014. Source: GSA
30 November 2014
15:00 PST

Milli Afghan	0–2	Alamo Muhammadan
	Report	Zakir Khan 5'; Nazeer Ahmed 88'

Attendance: 635
Referee: Jahangir Khan
2 December 2014
15:00 PST

Baloch Dalbandin	0–2	Alamo Muhammadan
	Report	Erfan 62', 69'

Attendance: 953
Referee: Irshad-ul-Haq
4 December 2014
15:00 PST

Milli Afghan	0–3	Baloch Dalbandin
	Report	Attaullah 67', 89'; Shah Saleem 77'

Attendance: 830
Referee: Hidayatullah

=== Final stage (Club) ===
Pos	Team	Pld	W	D	L	GF	GA	GD	Pts	Qualification
1	Baloch Nushki	2	1	1	0	2	0	+2	4	Promotion to Pakistan Premier League
2	Alamo Muhammadan	3	1	1	1	1	2	−1	4	
3	Lyallpur	2	0	0	2	0	3	−3	0	

Updated to match(es) played on 22 December 2014. Source: GSA
18 December 2014
11:00 PST

Lyallpur	0–1	Alamo Muhammadan
	Report	Nazeer Ahmed 10'

Attendance: 1,000
Referee: Javed Bangash
20 December 2014
11:00 PST

Baloch Nushki	2–0	Alamo Muhammadan
M. Rafique 61'; Obaidullah 76'	Report

Attendance: 10,000
Referee: M. Younis Lal
22 December 2014
11:00 PST

Lyallpur	0–0	Baloch Nushki
	Report

Attendance: 10,032
Referee: Javed Bangash

== Departmental phase ==
=== Group stage ===
==== Group A ====
Pos	Team	Pld	W	D	L	GF	GA	GD	Pts	Qualification
1	Gwadar Port Authority	2	1	1	0	4	1	+3	4	Advance to Final stage
2	Habib Bank	2	1	1	0	4	1	+3	4	
3	Insaf Afghan Goods	2	0	0	2	0	6	−6	0	

Updated to match(es) played on 10 December 2014. Source: GSA
24 November 2014
11:00 PST

Habib Bank	3–0	Insaf Afghan Goods
Saeed A. Aziz 45+2'; Atif Fateh 58'; Zubair Ahmed 61'	Report

Attendance: 500
Referee: Saadullah
26 November 2014
11:00 PST

Gwadar Port Authority	3–0	Insaf Afghan Goods
Naeem 11'; Mohsin Akber 32'; Pervez 41'	Report

Attendance: 1,566
Referee: Tahir Hussain
28 November 2014
11:00 PST

Habib Bank	1–1 (a.e.t.)	Gwadar Port Authority
Hafiz Hassan Faiz 44'	Report	Nasim Hussain 70'
Penalties
	5–3

Attendance: 966
Referee: Javed Bangash

==== Group B ====
Pos	Team	Pld	W	D	L	GF	GA	GD	Pts	Qualification
1	Pakistan Navy	2	2	0	0	5	2	+3	6	Advance to Final stage
2	Falcon Company	2	0	1	1	1	2	−1	1	
3	Pakistan Steel	2	0	1	1	1	3	−2	1	

Updated to match(es) played on 10 December 2014. Source: GSA
25 November 2014
11:00 PST

Pakistan Navy	2–1	Falcon Company
Naveed Ahmed 11'; Fazal Rehman 62'	Report	Syed Shahab-ud-din 45+1'

Attendance: 953
Referee: Arsalan Shareef
27 November 2014
11:00 PST

Pakistan Steel	0–0	Falcon Company
	Report

Attendance: 585
Referee: M. Younis Lal
2 December 2014
11:00 PST

Pakistan Navy	3–1	Pakistan Steel
	Report

Attendance: 1,396

==== Group C ====
Pos	Team	Pld	W	D	L	GF	GA	GD	Pts	Qualification
1	Pak Afghan Clearing	2	2	0	0	2	0	+2	6	Advance to Final stage
2	Sindh Government Press	2	1	0	1	2	1	+1	3	
3	Karachi United	2	0	0	2	0	3	−3	0	

Updated to match(es) played on 10 December 2014. Source: GSA
24 November 2014
11:00 PST

Pak Afghan Clearing	1–0	Sindh Government Press
Hazrat Moaaz 9'	Report

Attendance: 2,021
Referee: M. Younis Lal
26 November 2014
11:00 PST

Karachi United	0–2	Sindh Government Press
	Report

Attendance: 3,066
Referee: M. Younis Lal
28 November 2014
11:00 PST

Pak Afghan Clearing	1–0	Karachi United
Iftikhar A. Khan 75'	Report

Attendance: 2,036
Referee: Saleem Faiz

==== Group D ====
Pos	Team	Pld	W	D	L	GF	GA	GD	Pts	Qualification
1	Sui Southern Gas	2	2	0	0	6	0	+6	6	Advance to Final stage
2	Aqua Water Company	2	0	1	1	0	3	−3	1	
3	Social Welfare	2	0	1	1	0	3	−3	1	

Updated to match(es) played on 10 December 2014. Source: GSA
6 December 2014
11:00 PST

Sui Southern Gas	3–0	Aqua Water Company
Zakir Lashari 19'; Imran Hussain 43'; Saadullah 59'	Report

Attendance: 3,154
Referee: Arsalan Shareef
8 December 2014
11:00 PST

Social Welfare	0–0	Aqua Water Company
	Report

Attendance: 2,030
Referee: M. Younis Lal
10 December 2014
11:00 PST

Sui Southern Gas	3–0	Social Welfare
Saadullah 19', 43'; M. Lal 87'	Report

Attendance: 1,298
Referee: Anees Akhtar

==== Group E ====
Pos	Team	Pld	W	D	L	GF	GA	GD	Pts	Qualification
1	Higher Education	2	2	0	0	2	0	+2	6	Advance to Final stage
2	Sui Northern Gas	2	1	0	1	3	2	+1	3	
3	Hazara Coal Company	2	0	0	2	1	4	−3	0	

Updated to match(es) played on 10 December 2014. Source: GSA
24 November 2014
10:00 PST

Higher Education Commission	1–0	Sui Northern Gas
Awais Riasat 89'	Report

Attendance: 356
Referee: Rauf Bari
26 November 2014
10:00 PST

Sui Northern Gas	3–1	Hazara Coal Company
Ahmed Faheem 28', 86'; Usman Iqbal 36'	Report	Syed Abdullah 57'

Attendance: 852
Referee: Shahid Hussain
10 December 2014
10:00 PST

Higher Education Commission	1–0	Sui Northern Gas
Ali Raza 63'	Report

Attendance: 937
Referee: Waheed Murad

==== Group F ====
Pos	Team	Pld	W	D	L	GF	GA	GD	Pts	Qualification
1	Ashraf Sugar Mills	2	1	1	0	3	2	+1	4	Advance to Final stage
2	Pakistan Public Work Dept.	2	1	0	1	2	2	0	3	
3	Pakistan Police	2	0	1	1	1	2	−1	1	

Updated to match(es) played on 10 December 2014. Source: GSA
25 November 2014
11:00 PST

Pakistan Police	0–1	Pakistan Public Work Dept.
Asif Ali 63'	Report

Attendance: 3,132
Referee: Saleem Faiz
27 November 2014
11:00 PST

Ashraf Sugar Mills	2–1	Pakistan Public Work Dept.
M. Faiz 23'; Imran Ali 62'	Report	Sajid Hussain 23' (pen.)

Attendance: 651
Referee: Asad Mehmood
10 December 2014
11:00 PST

Pakistan Police	1–1	Ashraf Sugar Mills
M. Aamir 40'	Report	M. Shahbaz 65'

Attendance: 1,535
Referee: Javed Bangash

==== Group G ====
Pos	Team	Pld	W	D	L	GF	GA	GD	Pts	Qualification
1	Pakistan Television	2	2	0	0	3	1	+2	6	Advance to Final stage
2	Saif Textiles	2	1	0	1	3	3	0	3	
3	Bhatti United	2	0	0	2	1	3	−2	0	

Updated to match(es) played on 10 December 2014. Source: GSA
25 November 2014
10:00 PST

Pakistan Television	2–1	Saif Textiles
Rahman Ullah 61'; Sana Ullah 90+3'	Report	M. Usman Ghani 90+4'

Attendance: 751
Referee: Majid Khan
27 November 2014
10:00 PST

Pakistan Television	1–0	Bhatti United
Wali Khan 51'	Report

Attendance: 258
Referee: Shahid Hussain
10 December 2014
11:00 PST

Bhatti United	1–2	Saif Textiles
Talha Iftikhar 33'	Report	Mujahid Ali 37'; Usman Shafiq 81'

Attendance: 233
Referee: Irshad-ul-Haq

=== Final stage (Department) ===
==== Group 1 ====
Pos	Team	Pld	W	D	L	GF	GA	GD	Pts	Qualification
1	Higher Education Commission	2	1	1	0	3	2	+1	4	Advance to Play-offs final
2	Gwadar Port Authority	2	1	0	1	5	7	−2	3	
3	Pak Afghan Clearing	2	0	1	1	1	3	−2	1	

Updated to match(es) played on 21 December 2014. Source: GSA
14 December 2014
10:00 PST

Higher Education Commission	6–2	Gwadar Port Authority
Ali Raza 4'; Mohsin Ali 8'; Awais Riasat 10'; Mohsin Butt 21'; Moazzam Ali 79'	Report	Pervez 31'; Faisal 59'

Attendance: 3,566
Referee: Irshad-ul-Haq
16 December 2014
10:00 PST

Pak Afghan Clearing	0–0	Higher Education Commission
Wali Khan 51'	Report

Attendance: 300
Referee: Shahid Hussain
18 December 2014
11:00 PST

Gwadar Port Authority	3–1	Pak Afghan Clearing
Bilal Ali 15'; Pervez 44', 72'	Report	Iftikhar A. Khan 87'

Attendance: 356
Referee: Irshad-ul-Haq

==== Group 2 ====
Pos	Team	Pld	W	D	L	GF	GA	GD	Pts	Qualification
1	Pakistan Navy	3	3	0	0	7	0	+7	9	Advance to Play-offs final
2	Sui Southern Gas	3	2	0	1	7	1	+6	6	
3	Ashraf Sugar Mills	3	1	0	2	2	5	−3	3	
4	Pakistan Television	3	0	0	3	0	10	−10	0	

Updated to match(es) played on 21 December 2014. Source: GSA
15 December 2014
11:00 PST

Pakistan Navy	5–0	Pakistan Television
A. Haq 15'; Fazal Rehman 19'; Mohsin Ali 66'; Farhan 74'; Sajjad Ahmed 81'	Report

Attendance: 3,020
Referee: Habib Ullah
16 December 2014
11:00 PST

Sui Southern Gas	4–0	Ashraf Sugar Mills
M. Lal 24', 80'; Umair Ali 76'; Saadullah 79'	Report

Attendance: 1,200
Referee: Habib Ullah
18 December 2014
11:00 PST

Pakistan Navy	1–0	Ashraf Sugar Mills
Mohsin Ali 56'	Report

Attendance: 1,000
Referee: Jahangir Khan
19 December 2014
11:00 PST

Sui Southern Gas	3–0	Pakistan Television
Saadullah 45', 89'; M. Lal 71'	Report

Attendance: 1,000
Referee: Arsalan Shareef
21 December 2014
11:00 PST

Pakistan Navy	1–0	Sui Southern Gas
Mohsin Ali 61'	Report

Attendance: 3,000
Referee: Habib Ullah
21 December 2014
11:00 PST

Pakistan Television	0–2	Ashraf Sugar Mills
	Report

Attendance: 1,032

=== Play-off final ===
24 December 2014
11:00 PST

Pakistan Navy	2–1	Higher Education Commission
	Report

Korangi Baloch Stadium, Karachi
Attendance: 1,245

Pakistan Navy promoted to Pakistan Premier League.

== Federation League finals ==
27 December 2014
10:30 PST

Baloch Nushki	0–1	Pakistan Navy
	Report

Dr. Muhammad Ali Shah Stadium, Karachi
Attendance: 1,000

== Statistics ==
=== Top goalscorers ===
As of 27 December 2014.

Rank	Player	Club	Goals
1	(Pakistan) Saadullah Khan	Sui Southern Gas	6
2	(Pakistan) Pervez	Gwadar Port Authority	4
2	(Pakistan) Muhammad Lal	Sui Southern Gas	4
4	(Pakistan) Muhammad Tauseef Ahmed	Lyallpur	3
4	(Pakistan) Mohsin Ali	Pakistan Navy	3
