= Ahmed Faheem =

Pakistani association football player

Personal information
- Date of birth: 4 December 1994 (age 31)
- Place of birth: Khanewal, Pakistan
- Height: 1.75 m (5 ft 9 in)
- Position: Winger

Team information
- Current team: WAPDA
- Number: 17

Youth career
- Crown Club Khanewal

Senior career*
Years	Team	Apps	(Gls)
2011–2013	Wohaib		
2014–2015	Sui Northern Gas	2	(2)
2018–	WAPDA	20	(11)

International career^{‡}
2018–2019	Pakistan	3	(1)
- * Club domestic league appearances and goals as of January 13, 2019 ‡ National team caps and goals as of June 11, 2019

Ahmed Faheem (born 4 December 1994) is a Pakistani footballer who plays as a winger for WAPDA.

== Club career ==
=== Early career ===
Faheem first represented Khanewal based Crown Club at youth level. He also represented the Punjab provincial team in 2009. He later represented Lahore based club Wohaib, playing a crucial role for the club promotion to the top tier at the 2011 PFF League.

=== Sui Northern Gas ===
Faheem started his career with Lahore-based Sui Northern Gas, making his debut for the club on 26 November 2014 against Hazara Coal Company in the 2014–15 Pakistan Football Federation League. Faheem scored a brace on debut, scoring the opening goal of the match in the 28th minute and his second in the 86th minute as Sui Northern Gas won the match 3–1. His second match was a 1–0 defeat to Higher Education Commission. On 15 April 2015, Faheem scored on his National Football Challenge Cup debut against K-Electric in a 3–1 loss in the 86th minute during the group stage match in the 2015 NBP National Challenge Cup. Faheem also scored a penalty in the 88th minute against rivals Sui Southern Gas as his team lost 2–6 in the last match of the National Challenge Cup.

=== WAPDA ===
Faheem joined WAPDA in 2018, as there was no football league held since 2015. He scored on his debut for WAPDA in the opening match for 2018–19 Pakistan Premier League against Pakistan Army in a 1–1 draw. Faheem scored his first career hat-trick against Pakistan Navy in a 4–2 victory, scoring his first and third on penalties in 15th and 80th minute and second in 57th minute. On 8 November 2018, he scored the lone goal against Muslim in a 1–0 victory. Faheem ended his season with 11 goals in 20 appearances. Faheem scored in the semi-finals of 2018 National Challenge Cup against Pakistan Petroleum in a 2–0 victory. Faheem scored the opening goal in the finals against Pakistan Airforce in the 11th minute. WAPDA lost the match 2–1.

After three years of inactivity due to Pakistan Football Federation suspension by FIFA, Faheem scored the fastest goal in the 2023 PFF National Challenge Cup which came in the 37th second in a 5–0 victory against Saif Textile.

== International career ==
In 2010, Faheem represented Pakistan in the under-14 in Tehran.

Faheem made his senior debut for Pakistan against Bangladesh in 2018 SAFF Championship, coming on as a substitute for Muhammad Adil at the 79th minute. His second international appearances was against Bhutan, coming on as an 88th-minute substitute captain Hassan Bashir. Faheem scored his first international goal in the same match in the 90+1 minute as Pakistan won the match 3–0.

== Career statistics ==
=== Club ===
As of 13 January 2019

Club	Season	League			Cup (Note: Includes National Football Challenge Cup)		Total	
Club	Season	Division	Apps	Goals	Apps	Goals	Apps	Goals
Sui Northern Gas	2014–15	Football Federation League	2	2	3	2	5	4
Sui Northern Gas	Total		2	2	3	2	5	5
WAPDA	2018–19	Pakistan Premier League	20	11	5	2	25	13
WAPDA	Total		20	11	5	2	25	13
Career Totals			22	13	8	4	30	17

=== International ===
As of 11 June 2019

Appearances and goals by national team and year
Pakistan	Year	Apps	Goals
Pakistan	2018	2	1
Pakistan	2019	1	0
Total		2	1

Scores and results list Pakistan's goal tally first, score column indicates score after each Faheem goal.

List of international goals scored by Ahmed Faheem
No.	Date	Venue	Opponent	Score	Result	Competition
1	8 September 2018	Bangabandhu National Stadium, Dhaka, Bangladesh	Bhutan	3–0	3–0	2018 SAFF Championship

== Honours ==
=== WAPDA ===
- PFF National Challenge Cup: 2020, 2023–24
