= Aatish FC =

Pakistani football club

- Full name: Atish Football Club Tank
- Short name: AFCT
- League: PFF League
- 2014 PFF League: Group stage

Aatish Football Club is a Pakistani football club based in Tank, Khyber Pakhtunkhwa. It last competed in the 2014 PFF League.

== History ==
Atish Tank was founded by a group of 10 individuals, including club manager Hizbullah.

The club participated in the Peshawar District Football League in 2005, losing by 0–2 against United Club.

The club made its professional debut in the 2014 PFF League. It was one of the two clubs from Khyber Pakhtunkhwa who qualified, along with Mardan Blue Star, both qualifying by virtue of winning the inter-district tournaments. The club finished last in the group stage, after losing by 1–2 and 0–1 to Young Ittefaq and Baloch Nushki respectively.

The club subsequently missed league exposure for the next years, as Pakistan was suspended from all football activities by FIFA in 2015 due to the Pakistan Football Federation crisis.

In 2019, the club was ousted from the Khyber Pakhtunkhwa Football Cup organised by Ufone held at Tehmas Khan Football Stadium in Peshawar, after losing by 0–1 to DFA Chitral. In 2020, the club lost by 0–3 against Eleven Star from Bannu in the final of a tournament organised by the Frontier Corps. In 2021, the club again participated in the Ufone 4G Khyber Pakhtunkhwa Football Cup 2021, again losing to DFA Chitral by 2–4 in the penalties after both sides failed to score a goal. In 2022, the club clinched a record victory of 7–1 over POPO FC in final of the Peshawar Football League. In the subsequent edition of the Peshawar Football League in 2023, the club failed to defend the title after losing to Ideal FC Chitral by 3–4 in the final.

== Competitive record ==
The club's competitive records since the 2014 season are listed below.

Season	Div	Tms	Pos	National Challenge Cup	AFC President's Cup	AFC Cup
2014–15	Football Federation League	30	Group stage	DNP	DNP	DNP
