= 2018 National Challenge Cup =

Tournament details
- Country: Pakistan
- City: Karachi
- Venue(s): All Brother's Football Stadium; KPT Stadium
- Dates: 21 April 2018 –10 May 2018
- Teams: 24

Final positions
- Champions: Pakistan Air Force (2nd title)
- Runners-up: WAPDA
- Third place: Pakistan Petroleum
- Fourth place: Civil Aviation Authority

Tournament statistics
- Matches played: 32
- Goals scored: 74 (2.31 per match)
- Attendance: 42,500 (1,328 per match)
- Top goal scorer: Nazir Ahmed (5 goals)

Awards
- Best player: Zaid Umar
- Best goalkeeper: Ghazanfar Yasin
- All statistics correct as of May 10, 2018.

The 2018 National Challenge Cup was the 27th edition of domestic association football cup competition in Pakistan. 24 teams participated in the competition held from 21 April to 10 May 2018. The National Challenge Cup was held in Karachi after FIFA lifted its ban on the Pakistan Football Federation (PFF). The matches were played at the KPT Stadium and the All Brothers Football Stadium, Malir.

The tournament took place after a gap of two years due to a power struggle within the Pakistan Football Federation. The Federation was being run by a court-appointed administrator, whose appointment was declared unlawful by a division bench of the High Court which ordered financial and administrative control to be handed over to the legitimate body headed by Syed Faisal Saleh Hayat. FIFA also lifted the ban imposed on PFF after the legitimate body was restored by the court ruling.

The tournament coincided with the appointment of José Antonio Nogueira as head coach of the Pakistan national football team on 16 April 2018. Nogueira reached Karachi on 26 April to witness the event first-hand.

== Teams ==
The 24 teams participating in the tournament are as below:

2018 Pakistan National Teams
#	Name	#	Name	#	Name	#	Name
1	K-Electric F.C.	7	Pakistan Airlines	13	Pakistan Police	19	Civil Aviation Authority
2	WAPDA	8	National Bank	14	Pakistan Public Works Department	20	Karachi United
3	Pakistan Army	9	Sui Northern Gas	15	Sindh Government Press	21	Hazara Coal
4	Khan Research Laboratories	10	Karachi Port Trust	16	Gwadar Port Authority	22	Pakistan Ordnance Factories
5	Pakistan Airforce	11	Pakistan Navy	17	Sui Southern Gas	23	Ashraf Sugar Mills
6	Falcon	12	Pakistan Petroleum	18	State Life	24	Asia Ghee Mills

== Group stage ==
=== Group A ===
Pos	Team	Pld	W	D	L	GF	GA	GD	Pts	Qualification
1	Ashraf Sugar Mills	2	1	1	0	1	0	+1	4	Advance to Knockout round
2	National Bank	2	1	0	1	3	1	+2	3	
3	Falcon	2	0	1	1	0	3	−3	1	

Updated to match(es) played on 21 April 2018. Source:
21 April 2018
16:30 PST

National Bank	0–1	Ashraf Sugar Mills
	Report	Abbas Ahmed 90+2'

KPT Stadium, Karachi
Attendance: 1,100
Referee: Muhammad Ahmad Rauf
25 April 2018
16:30 PST

National Bank	3–0	Falcon
Maqbool 2'; Munir Ahmed 28'; Zain-ul-Abdeen 72'	Report

All Brothers Football Ground, Karachi
Attendance: 1,800
Referee: Adnan Anjum
29 April 2018
16:30 PST

Ashraf Sugar Mills	0–0	Falcon
	Report

All Brother's Football Ground, Karachi
Attendance: 1,000
Referee: Adnan Anjum

=== Group B ===
Pos	Team	Pld	W	D	L	GF	GA	GD	Pts	Qualification
1	Pakistan Navy	2	2	0	0	5	1	+4	6	Advance to Knockout round
2	Pakistan Airlines	2	1	0	1	3	2	+1	3	
3	Hazara Coal	2	0	0	2	0	5	−5	0	

Updated to match(es) played on 21 April 2018. Source:
22 April 2018
16:30 PST

Pakistan Airlines	1–2	Pakistan Navy
Tariq Solangi 20'	Report	Hafiz Hassan 2'; M. Ameen 53'

All Brothers Football Ground, Karachi
Attendance: 1,500
Referee: Muhammad Ahmad Rauf
26 April 2018
16:30 PST

Pakistan Airlines	3–0	Hazara Coal
Lashari 8'; Nasrullah 63'	Report

All Brothers Football Ground, Karachi
Attendance: 1,000
Referee: Adnan Anjum
30 April 2018
16:30 PST

Pakistan Navy	3–0	Hazara Coal
M. Yousaf 50'; Hafiz Hassan 85'; Sajjad Ahmed 89'	Report

All Brother's Football Ground, Karachi
Attendance: 1,200
Referee: Adnan Anjum

=== Group C ===
Pos	Team	Pld	W	D	L	GF	GA	GD	Pts	Qualification
1	Pakistan Airforce	2	1	1	0	4	2	+2	4	Advance to Knockout round
2	State Life	2	1	0	1	2	3	−1	3	
3	Pakistan Police	2	0	1	1	3	4	−1	1	

Updated to match(es) played on 21 April 2018. Source:
23 April 2018
16:30 PST

Pakistan Airforce	2–2	Pakistan Police
Ali Raza 23'; Mansoor 27'	Report	Amir Shah 74'; Sher Hassan 77'

All Brothers Football Ground, Karachi
Attendance: 2,000
Referee: Adnan Anjum
27 April 2018
16:30 PST

Pakistan Police	1–2	State Life
Yousaf Ali 12'	Report	Imtiaz 25'; M. Zakir 71'

All Brothers Football Ground, Karachi
Attendance: 500
Referee: Jahangir Khan
1 May 2018
16:30 PST

Pakistan Airforce	2–0	State Life
Samad Khan 54'; Salman Khan 90+3'	Report

All Brother's Football Ground, Karachi
Attendance: 1,000
Referee: Muhammad Ahmad Rauf

=== Group D ===
Pos	Team	Pld	W	D	L	GF	GA	GD	Pts	Qualification
1	Civil Aviation Authority	2	2	0	0	4	1	+3	6	Advance to Knockout round
2	Khan Research Laboratories	2	1	0	1	3	1	+2	3	
3	Sindh Government Press	2	0	0	2	1	6	−5	0	

Updated to match(es) played on 21 April 2018. Source:
24 April 2018
16:30 PST

Khan Research Laboratories	3–0	Sindh Government Press
Umair Ali 13'; Izharullah 43'; Zeeshan Siddiqui 45+1'	Report

All Brothers Football Ground, Karachi
Attendance: 1,000
Referee: Jahangir Khan
28 April 2018
16:30 PST

Sindh Government Press	1–2	Civil Aviation Authority
M. Jahanzaib 17'	Report	Dawood Javed 25'; Saeed A. Aziz 60'; M. Naeem 86'

All Brothers Football Ground, Karachi
Attendance: 1,000
Referee: Touqeer Aslam
2 May 2018
16:30 PST

Khan Research Laboratories	0–1	Civil Aviation Authority
	Report	Zaid Umar 86'

All Brother's Football Ground, Karachi
Attendance: 1,200
Referee: Muhammad Ahmad Rauf

=== Group E ===
Pos	Team	Pld	W	D	L	GF	GA	GD	Pts	Qualification
1	Pakistan Petroleum	2	2	0	0	3	0	+3	6	Advance to Knockout round
2	Karachi Port Trust	2	1	0	1	4	2	+2	3	
3	Pakistan Public Works Department	2	0	0	2	1	6	−5	0	

Updated to match(es) played on 21 April 2018. Source:
22 April 2018
15:00 PST

Karachi Port Trust	4–1	Pakistan Public Works Department
Fareed 11'; Muhammad 31', 85'; Zahid Ahmed 80'	Report	Zubair 43'

KPT Stadium, Karachi
Attendance: 2,500
Referee: Adnan Anjum
25 April 2018
16:30 PST

Pakistan Public Works Department	0–2	Pakistan Petroleum
	Report	Mehrullah 50', 62'

KPT Stadium, Karachi
Attendance: 1,200
Referee: Mohammad Ahmad Rauf
29 April 2018
16:30 PST

Karachi Port Trust	0–1	Pakistan Petroleum
	Report	Nazir Ahmed 12'

KPT Stadium, Karachi
Attendance: 1,500
Referee: Muhammad Ahmad Rauf

=== Group F ===
Pos	Team	Pld	W	D	L	GF	GA	GD	Pts	Qualification
1	WAPDA	2	2	0	0	4	0	+4	6	Advance to Knockout round
2	Sui Southern Gas	2	1	0	1	2	2	0	3	
3	Karachi United	2	0	0	2	1	5	−4	0	

Updated to match(es) played on 21 April 2018. Source:
22 April 2018
17:00 PST

WAPDA	1–0	Sui Southern Gas
M. Ali 56'	Report

KPT Stadium, Karachi
Attendance: 2,500
Referee: Jahangir Khan
26 April 2018
16:30 PST

Sui Southern Gas	2–1	Karachi United
Bilawal-ur-Rehman 24'; A. Naeem 72'	Report	Fazal Muhammad 39'

KPT Stadium, Karachi
Attendance: 800
Referee: Mohammad Ahmad Rauf
30 April 2018
16:30 PST

WAPDA	3–0	Karachi United
Naeem Ullah 49'; Saadat Hussain 52'; Ali Uzair 56'	Report

KPT Stadium, Karachi
Attendance: 800
Referee: Jahangir Khan

=== Group G ===
Pos	Team	Pld	W	D	L	GF	GA	GD	Pts	Qualification
1	Pakistan Army	2	2	0	0	2	0	+2	6	Advance to Knockout round
2	Gwadar Port Authority	2	1	0	1	4	2	+2	3	
3	Pakistan Ordnance Factories	2	0	0	2	1	5	−4	0	

Updated to match(es) played on 21 April 2018. Source:
23 April 2018
16:30 PST

Pakistan Army	1–0	Gwadar Port Authority
Nisar Ahmed 84' (pen.)	Report

KPT Stadium, Karachi
Attendance: 2,500
Referee: Muhammad Ahmad Rauf
27 April 2018
16:30 PST

Gwadar Port Authority	4–1	Pakistan Ordnance Factories
Pervez 6', 54'; A. Wajid 48'; Shoaib 69'	Report	Touseef Ahmad 88'

KPT Stadium, Karachi
Attendance: 800
Referee: Mohammad Ahmad Rauf
1 May 2018
16:30 PST

Pakistan Army	1–0	Pakistan Ordnance Factories
Umar Waqar 9'	Report

KPT Stadium, Karachi
Attendance: 1,500
Referee: Jahangir Khan

=== Group H ===
Pos	Team	Pld	W	D	L	GF	GA	GD	Pts	Qualification
1	Asia Ghee Mills	2	1	1	0	1	0	+1	4	Advance to Knockout round
2	Sui Northern Gas	2	1	0	1	1	1	0	3	
3	K-Electric	2	0	1	1	0	1	−1	1	

Updated to match(es) played on 21 April 2018. Source:
24 April 2018
16:30 PST

K-Electric	0–1	Sui Northern Gas
	Report	Umer Javed 60'

KPT Stadium, Karachi
Attendance: 2,000
Referee: Touqeer Aslam
28 April 2018
16:30 PST

K-Electric	0–0	Asia Ghee Mills
	Report

KPT Stadium, Karachi
Attendance: 1,200
Referee: Adnan Anjum
2 May 2018
16:30 PST

Sui Northern Gas	0–1	Asia Ghee Mills
	Report	Mubashir Hussian 43'

KPT Stadium, Karachi
Attendance: 500
Referee: Adnan Anjum

== Knockout round ==
=== Quarter-finals ===
3 May 2018
16:00 PST

Ashraf Sugar Mills	0–3	Pakistan Petroleum
	Report	Abdullah 4', 70'; Nazir Ahmed 11'

KPT Stadium, Karachi
Attendance: 800
Referee: Adnan Anjum
4 May 2018
16:00 PST

WAPDA	2–0 (a.e.t.)	Pakistan Navy
M. Ahmed 98', 118'	Report

KPT Stadium, Karachi
Attendance: 1,000
Referee: Jahangir Khan
5 May 2018
16:00 PST

Pakistan Army	0–0 (a.e.t.)	Pakistan Airforce
	Report
Penalties
Nisar Ahmed (penalty missed); Shoaib Nisar (penalty scored); Ansar Abbas (penalty scored); Shehbaz Younis (penalty missed)	2–4	(penalty scored) Mansoor; (penalty scored) M. Sohail; (penalty scored) Samad Khan; (penalty scored) Ghazanfer

KPT Stadium, Karachi
Attendance: 1,200
Referee: Mohammad Ahmad Rauf
6 May 2018
16:00 PST

Civil Aviation Authority	2–1	Asia Ghee Mills
Zaid Umar 13'; Nouman 66'	Report	Sajid Ali 15'

KPT Stadium, Karachi
Attendance: 1,200
Referee: Adnan Anjum

=== Semi-finals ===
7 May 2018
16:00 PST

WAPDA	2–0	Pakistan Petroleum
Ahmed 14'; Usman 29'	Report

KPT Stadium, Karachi
Attendance: 1,000
Referee: Adnan Anjum
7 May 2018
16:00 PST

Pakistan Airforce	1–1 (a.e.t.)	Civil Aviation Authority
Sohail Khan 59'	Report	Saeed A. Aziz 25'
Penalties
Mansoor (penalty scored); M. Sohail (penalty missed); Samad Khan (penalty scored); Ghazanfer (penalty missed); A. Rehman (penalty scored); Salman (penalty scored)	4–3	(penalty missed) Nouman; (penalty missed) Zaid Umar; (penalty scored) Zain-ul-Abdeen; (penalty scored) Ubaidullah; (penalty scored) Dawood Javed; (penalty missed) Saeed Babar

KPT Stadium, Karachi
Attendance: 1,500
Referee: Jahangir Khan

=== Third position ===
9 May 2018
16:00 PST

Pakistan Petroleum	5–1	Civil Aviation Authority
Abdullah 21'; Mehrullah 26'; Nazir Ahmed 67', 79', 85'	Report	Zain 57'

KPT Stadium, Karachi
Attendance: 1,200
Referee: Adnan Anjum

=== Finals ===
10 May 2018
16:00 PST

WAPDA	1–2	Pakistan Airforce
Ahmed 11'	Report	M. Mujahid 32'; Samad Khan 66'

KPT Stadium, Karachi
Attendance: 2,500
Referee: Mohammad Ahmad Rauf

=== Bracket ===
Quarter-finals
3 May – 4:00 PM
Ashraf Sugar Mills	0
Pakistan Petroleum	3
4 May – 4:00 PM
Pakistan Navy	0
WAPDA (AET)	2
5 May – 4:00 PM
Pakistan Airforce (P)	0 (4)
Pakistan Army	0 (2)
6 May – 4:00 PM
Civil Aviation Authority	2
Asia Ghee Mills	1

Semi-finals
7 May – 4:00 PM
Pakistan Petroleum	0
WAPDA	2
8 May – 4:00 PM
Pakistan Airforce (P)	1 (4)
Civil Aviation Authority	1 (3)

Final
10 May – 4:00 PM
WAPDA	1
Pakistan Airforce	2
Third place
9 May – 4:00 PM
Pakistan Petroleum	5
Civil Aviation Authority	1

== Top scorers ==
As of 10 May 2018

Position	Player	Club	Goals
1	Nazir Ahmed	Pakistan Petroleum	5
2	Abdullah	Pakistan Petroleum	3
2	Mehrullah	Pakistan Petroleum	3
4	Samad Khan	Pakistan Airforce	2
4	Muhammad Ahmed	WAPDA	2
4	Pervez Kouda	Gwadar Port Authority	2
4	Hafiz Hassan Faiz	Pakistan Navy	2
4	Muhammad	Karachi Port Trust	2
4	Zaid Umar	Civil Aviation Authority	2
4	Saeed Abdul Aziz	Civil Aviation Authority	2
