= 2017 Maldivian Third Division Football Tournament =

Tournament details
- Country: Maldives
- Teams: 39

Final positions
- Champions: DSC
- Runners-up: Sea Life

Statistics of Third Division Football Tournament in the 2017 season. Tournament started on November 1.

== Teams ==
49 teams are competition in the 2017 Third Division Football Tournament, and these teams were divided into 9 groups of 4 teams, and 1 group with 3 teams, making up a total of 10 groups.

Group 1

- Club Amigos
- Dhivehi Sifainge Club
- LQ Sports
- Thimarafushi Friendly Players

Group 2

- C.B.L
- Bench
- Confere
- Falcon Sports Club

Group 3

- Red Line Club
- Lorenzo
- Club All Youth Linkage
- Sports Club Rivalsa

Group 4

- Buru Sports
- Super United Sports
- Sea Land
- College

Group 5

- Police Club
- U.N friends
- Tent Sports Club
- Rage

Group 6

- Lagoons Sports Club
- Gaamagu
- Offu Football Club
- Dhandu Goalhi

Group 7

- Valiant Sports Club
- Sent Sports Club
- Zefro
- Club Rock Street

Group 8

- Dribbling Stars
- Muiveyo Friends Club
- Youth Revolution Club
- Villimale United

Group 9

- Sports Club Veloxia
- Thulhaadhoo Aventures Sports
- Kumundhoo
- L.T Sports

Group 10

- Sea Life
- Lineage
- The Bows

== Group stage ==
All times listed are Maldives Standard Time.

=== Group 1 ===
Team	Pld	W	D	L	GF	GA	GD	Pts
T1	0	0	0	0	0	0	0	0
T2	0	0	0	0	0	0	0	0
T3	0	0	0	0	0	0	0	0
T4	0	0	0	0	0	0	0	0

Club Amigos	0–6	Dhivehi Sifainge Club	Turf Ground 1, Malé
	Report

–	Turf Ground 1, Malé

–	Turf Ground 1, Malé

–	Turf Ground 1, Malé

–	Turf Ground 1, Malé

–	Turf Ground 1, Malé

=== Group 2 ===
Team	Pld	W	D	L	GF	GA	GD	Pts
T1	0	0	0	0	0	0	0	0
T2	0	0	0	0	0	0	0	0
T3	0	0	0	0	0	0	0	0
T4	0	0	0	0	0	0	0	0

C.B.L Sports	1–2	Bench Sports Club	Turf Ground 1, Malé
	Report

Confere Sports Club	6–2	Falcon Sports Club	Turf Ground 1, Malé
	Report

–	Turf Ground 1, Malé

–	Turf Ground 1, Malé

–	Turf Ground 1, Malé

–	Turf Ground 1, Malé

=== Group 3 ===
Team	Pld	W	D	L	GF	GA	GD	Pts
T1	0	0	0	0	0	0	0	0
T2	0	0	0	0	0	0	0	0
T3	0	0	0	0	0	0	0	0
T4	0	0	0	0	0	0	0	0

Lorenzo Sports Club	1–0	Red Line Club	Turf Ground 1, Malé
	Report

–	Turf Ground 1, Malé

–	Turf Ground 1, Malé

–	Turf Ground 1, Malé

–	Turf Ground 1, Malé

–	Turf Ground 1, Malé

=== Group 4 ===
Team	Pld	W	D	L	GF	GA	GD	Pts
T1	0	0	0	0	0	0	0	0
T2	0	0	0	0	0	0	0	0
T3	0	0	0	0	0	0	0	0
T4	0	0	0	0	0	0	0	0

Buru Sports Club	3–0	Super United Sports	Turf Ground 1, Malé
	Report

–	Turf Ground 1, Malé

–	Turf Ground 1, Malé

–	Turf Ground 1, Malé

–	Turf Ground 1, Malé

–	Turf Ground 1, Malé

=== Group 5 ===
Team	Pld	W	D	L	GF	GA	GD	Pts
T1	0	0	0	0	0	0	0	0
T2	0	0	0	0	0	0	0	0
T3	0	0	0	0	0	0	0	0
T4	0	0	0	0	0	0	0	0

Police Club	1–0	U.N Friends	Turf Ground 1, Malé
	Report

–	Turf Ground 1, Malé

–	Turf Ground 1, Malé

–	Turf Ground 1, Malé

–	Turf Ground 1, Malé

–	Turf Ground 1, Malé

=== Group 6 ===
Team	Pld	W	D	L	GF	GA	GD	Pts
T1	0	0	0	0	0	0	0	0
T2	0	0	0	0	0	0	0	0
T3	0	0	0	0	0	0	0	0
T4	0	0	0	0	0	0	0	0

Lagoons Sports Club	–	Club Gaamagu	Turf Ground 1, Malé

–	Turf Ground 1, Malé

–	Turf Ground 1, Malé

–	Turf Ground 1, Malé

–	Turf Ground 1, Malé

–	Turf Ground 1, Malé

=== Group 7 ===
Team	Pld	W	D	L	GF	GA	GD	Pts
T1	0	0	0	0	0	0	0	0
T2	0	0	0	0	0	0	0	0
T3	0	0	0	0	0	0	0	0
T4	0	0	0	0	0	0	0	0

–	Turf Ground 1, Malé

–	Turf Ground 1, Malé

–	Turf Ground 1, Malé

–	Turf Ground 1, Malé

–	Turf Ground 1, Malé

–	Turf Ground 1, Malé

=== Group 8 ===
Team	Pld	W	D	L	GF	GA	GD	Pts
T1	0	0	0	0	0	0	0	0
T2	0	0	0	0	0	0	0	0
T3	0	0	0	0	0	0	0	0
T4	0	0	0	0	0	0	0	0

–	Turf Ground 1, Malé

–	Turf Ground 1, Malé

–	Turf Ground 1, Malé

–	Turf Ground 1, Malé

–	Turf Ground 1, Malé

–	Turf Ground 1, Malé

=== Group 9 ===
Team	Pld	W	D	L	GF	GA	GD	Pts
T1	0	0	0	0	0	0	0	0
T2	0	0	0	0	0	0	0	0
T3	0	0	0	0	0	0	0	0
T4	0	0	0	0	0	0	0	0

–	Turf Ground 1, Malé

–	Turf Ground 1, Malé

–	Turf Ground 1, Malé

–	Turf Ground 1, Malé

–	Turf Ground 1, Malé

–	Turf Ground 1, Malé

=== Group 10 ===
Team	Pld	W	D	L	GF	GA	GD	Pts
T1	0	0	0	0	0	0	0	0
T2	0	0	0	0	0	0	0	0
T3	0	0	0	0	0	0	0	0

–	Turf Ground 1, Malé

–	Turf Ground 1, Malé

–	Turf Ground 1, Malé

== Final ==
24 December 2017
16:00

DSC	1–1	Sea Life
Nadheef Ibrahim 80'	Report (in Dhivehi)	86' Rasheed Omokafe Adeyanju
Penalties
	3–2

National Football Stadium, Malé

== Awards ==
Award	Details
Best Player	Rasheed Omokafe Adeyanju (Sea Life Sports Club)
Best Goalkeeper	Abdulla Arusham (Buru Sports Club)
