= Pakistan Public Works Department =

Public Works Department of the Government of Pakistan

Pakistan Public Works Department (Urdu: پاکستان پبلک ورکس ڈیپارٹمنٹ) was a federal government department under Ministry of Housing and Works. It was based in Islamabad, and had sub-offices in all the major cities of the country.

== History ==
The Public Works Department was established in 1854 during British India by Lord Dalhousie to oversee and implement construction projects in the region.

After the formation of Pakistan in 1947, it was renamed Pakistan Public Works Department (PWD). The department operated under the Ministry of Housing and Works and at its peak employed around seven thousand personnel.

On June 4, 2024, Prime Minister Shahbaz Sharif ordered the abolition of PWD owing to poor performance and widespread corruption. On July 5, closure of Pakistan PWD officially commenced. Pakistan Infrastructure Development and Asset Management Authority will be created under a special Act to replace Pakistan PWD.
