= Ahsan Ullah =

Pakistani footballer

Personal information
- Full name: Ahsan Ullah Khan
- Date of birth: 13 December 1992 (age 33)
- Place of birth: Quetta, Pakistan
- Position: Right-back

Senior career*
Years	Team	Apps	(Gls)
2007–2011	Karachi Port Trust	30	(0)
2011–2018	Khan Research Laboratories	86	(3)
2018–2022	Sui Southern Gas	20	(0)

International career^{‡}
2010–2014	Pakistan U23	2	(0)
2013–2015	Pakistan	11	(0)
- * Club domestic league appearances and goals as of January 13, 2019 ‡ National team caps and goals as of March 23, 2015

Ahsan Ullah Khan is a Pakistani footballer who plays as a right-back.

== Club career ==
=== Karachi Port Trust ===
Khan started his career at Karachi Port Trust in 2007.

=== Khan Research Laboratories ===
In 2011, Khan moved to Khan Research Laboratories where he won three consecutive league titles and three National Cup titles. He was a member of the team which reached the 2013 AFC President's Cup final, after falling to Turkmen club Balkan FT by 0–1 in the final.

=== Sui Southern Gas ===
In 2018, Khan signed for SSGC. In 2021, SSGC club was closed after the shutdown of departmental sports in Pakistan. After the restoration of departmental sports in Pakistan, SSGC terminated contracts of the players of the squad, including Khan's, on 26 August 2022.

== International career ==
Khan started his international career with Pakistan U23 during 2014 Asian Games against Thailand U23. He made his second appearance against China U23 in the Asian Games and also played in a test series against Palestine in 2011.

He made his senior debut at the 2013 SAFF Championship against India, coming on as an 87th-minute substitute for Kaleemullah Khan. He made his second appearance against Nepal, coming on as an 89th-minute substitute for Hassan Bashir. He earned his first full cap in the final group stage game against Bangladesh.

== Career statistics ==
As of match played 19 May 2019

Appearances and goals by club, season and competition
Club	Season	League			National Cup (Note: National Football Challenge Cup)		Asia (Note: AFC President's Cup)		Total	
Club	Season	Division	Apps	Goals	Apps	Goals	Apps	Goals	Apps	Goals
Karachi Port Trust	2007–08	Pakistan Premier League	5	0	1	0	—		6	0
Karachi Port Trust	2008–09	Pakistan Premier League	1	0	3	0	—		4	0
Karachi Port Trust	2009–10	Pakistan Premier League	16	0	—		—		16	0
Karachi Port Trust	2010–11	Pakistan Premier League	8	0	4	0	—		12	0
Karachi Port Trust	Total		30	0	8	0	–	–	38	0
Khan Research Laboratories	2011–12	Pakistan Premier League	20	1	6	0	4	0	30	1
Khan Research Laboratories	2012–13	Pakistan Premier League	26	0	3	0	6	0	35	0
Khan Research Laboratories	2013–14	Pakistan Premier League	23	2	1	0	3	0	27	2
Khan Research Laboratories	2014–15	Pakistan Premier League	17	0	6	0	—		23	0
Khan Research Laboratories	2015–16	Pakistan Premier League	—		6	0	—		6	0
Khan Research Laboratories	Total		86	3	22	0	13	0	121	3
Sui Southern Gas	2018–19	Pakistan Premier League	20	0	2	0	—		22	0
Sui Southern Gas	Total		20	0	2	0	–	–	22	0
Career total			136	3	32	0	13	0	181	3

=== International ===
Appearances and goals by national team and year
National team	Year	Apps	Goals
Pakistan	2013	5	0
Pakistan	2014	3	0
Pakistan	2015	3	0
Total		11	0
