= Chaudhry Muhammad Ashraf (senator) =

Pakistani politician

Senator Chaudhry Muhammad Ashraf

Member of the Senate of Pakistan
- In office 1973–1977

Personal details
- Born: 1925 Chillianwala, Mandi Bahauddin, Punjab, British India
- Died: 1983 (aged 57–58)
- Party: Pakistan Peoples Party
- Children: Zaka Ashraf
- Parent: Khan Muhammad Ashraf Sr. (Father)
- Occupation: Politician; Businessman

Chaudhry Muhammad Ashraf was a Pakistani politician and businessman who was the founder of Ashraf Sugar Mills and Ashraf Coal Mines.

== Early life ==
Chaudhry Ashraf was born in 1925, to a well-known family in Challianwala, Mandi Bahauddin District and was the son of Khan Muhammad Ashraf Sr. (1889-1985). He served in World War II at the age of 15, and fought in The Blitz. Chaudhrey graduated from Bahauddin University with a bachelor's degree in 1946. His uncle Chaudhry Rehmat Ali was a close associate of Muhammad Ali Jinnah. He founded Ashraf Sugar Mills in the 1950s.

He was the father of former Chairman Pakistan Cricket Board Zaka Ashraf. After his son Zaka graduated from Cadet College Petro with his bachelor's degree in 1973, he planned to serve in the Army and eventually became a Navy Officer and later travel aboard in several countries including Jamaica and Panama, but by his father's request he was to work at his business, so that when he died The Ashraf name would carry on with his son.

== Political career ==
He became member of Senate of Pakistan as the candidate of Pakistan Peoples Party (PPP) in the government of Zulfikar Ali Bhutto.

== Death ==
He died in November 1983. After his death, his son Zaka became the Chairman of Ashraf Sugar Mills and inherited his late father's fortune.
