= Shahbaz Younas =

Pakistani footballer (born 1996)

Personal information
- Date of birth: 2 March 1996 (age 30)
- Place of birth: Faisalabad, Punjab, Pakistan
- Position: Centre-back

Senior career*
Years	Team	Apps	(Gls)
2014–2021	Pakistan Army	31	(5)

International career
2015–2018	Pakistan U23	6	(0)
2015–2018	Pakistan	4	(0)
Medal record
Pakistan Army
Second place	Pakistan Premier League	2014–15
Third place	National Challenge Cup	2015
- * Club domestic league appearances and goals

Shahbaz Younas (Urdu: شہباز یونس, born on 2 March 1996) is a Pakistani former footballer who played as a centre-back for Pakistan Army. Younas has represented both Pakistan national football team and Pakistan U23 team simultaneously from 2015.

== Club career ==
=== Pakistan Army ===
==== 2014–15 ====
Younas started his career with Pakistan Army in 2014–15 season. In his debut season, he made 10 league appearances and 6 appearances in National Cup, he made a total of 16 appearances in the debut season as Pakistan Army finished second in the league and won the third place match in the 2015 NBP National Challenge Cup.

==== 2018–19 ====
Younas started his 2018–19 with 2018 National Challenge Cup, as Pakistan Army lost to Pakistan Air Force on penalties in the quarter-finals. Younas scored his first goal for Pakistan Army in a 2–2 draw against Pakistan Air Force, Younas scored the goal at 49th minute. Younas scored his second goal after two months, scoring the fourth goal against Baloch Nushki at 85th minute as Pakistan Army won the match 5–0. Younas ended his season with 21 league appearances and two goals, along with 3 National Cup appearances.

== International career ==
Younas made his international debut on 23 March 2015 against Yemen in 2018 FIFA World Cup qualifications. In 2018, Shahbaz made three appearances for the national side in 2018 SAFF Championship against Bangladesh, Bhutan and India.

== Career statistics ==
As of 13 January 2019

Club	Season	League			National Cup		Total	
Club	Season	Division	Apps	Goals	Apps	Goals	Apps	Goals
Pakistan Army	2014–15	Pakistan Premier League	10	0	6	0	16	0
Pakistan Army	2018–19	Pakistan Premier League	21	2	3	0	24	2
Pakistan Army	Career total			31	2	9	40	2

=== International ===
Appearances and goals by national team and year
National team	Year	Apps	Goals
Pakistan	2015	1	0
Pakistan	2018	3	0
Total		4	0

== Honours ==
- National Football Challenge Cup: 2019
