= Mohsin Ali (footballer) =

Pakistani footballer (born 1996)

Personal information
- Date of birth: 1 June 1996 (age 30)
- Place of birth: Faisalabad, Pakistan
- Position: Left-back

Senior career*
Years	Team	Apps	(Gls)
2014–2017	Pakistan Navy		
2017–2024	WAPDA		

International career
2012	Pakistan U20		
2013–2018	Pakistan U23	6	(0)
2014–2018	Pakistan	9	(0)
- * Club domestic league appearances and goals

Mohsin Ali (born 1 June 1996) is a Pakistani former footballer who played as a left-back.

== Club career ==
=== Pakistan Navy ===
Ali started his career with Pakistan Navy F.C., making his debut in a 1–1 draw against Khan Research Laboratories in the 2014 National Football Challenge Cup. His second appearance was against Pakistan Airlines, in a match they lost 2–1.

=== WAPDA ===
Ali moved to WAPDA in 2017. He won the 2020 PFF National Challenge Cup.

== International career ==
Ali made his senior international debut in a friendly 3–1 away loss to Lebanon. He came on as a 77th-minute substitute for Ahsan Ullah. Ali played in the 2018 SAFF Championship; his first match, against Nepal in the group stage, was won by Pakistan 1–2. In his second group-stage match against Bangladesh, he was booked in the 81st minute as Pakistan lost the match 1–0. His final group-stage appearance was a 3–0 win over Bhutan. Ali started for Pakistan in the semi-finals against India, where he was sent-off in the 86th minute along with Indian midfielder Lallianzuala Chhangte after a brawl between the two players as India defeated Pakistan 3–1.

== Career statistics ==
=== International ===
Appearances and goals by national team and year
National team	Year	Apps	Goals
Pakistan	2014	3	0
Pakistan	2015	2	0
Pakistan	2018	4	0
Total		9	0

== Honours ==
=== WAPDA ===
- PFF National Challenge Cup: 2020
