= State Life =

Pakistani state owned insurer

- Type: Government organization
- Industry: Life insurance
- Predecessor: Adamjee Life Insurance; EFU Life Insurance; United Life Insurance; New Jubilee Life Insurance; Habib Life Insurance; Premier Life Insurance; Central Life Insurance; IGI Life Insurance; Union Life Insurance
- Founded: November 1972; 53 years ago
- Headquarters: Karachi, Pakistan
- Key people: Shoaib Javed Hussain (CEO) Senator Saleem Zia (Chairman)
- Products: Life insurance; Pensions; Annuities; Takaful; Bancassurance
- Revenue: ▲ Rs. 208.374 billion (US$750 million) - 2019
- Net income: ▲ Rs. 1.27 billion (US$4.5 million) - 2017
- Total assets: ▲ Rs. 1.058 trillion (US$3.8 billion) - 2019
- Owner: Government of Pakistan
- Website: statelife.com.pk

The State Life Insurance Corporation of Pakistan (SLIC) (Urdu: اسٹیٹ لائف انشورنس), commonly known as State Life, is Pakistan's largest state-owned life and health insurance company based in Karachi.

Shoaib Javed Hussain, CEO of State Life is assisted by four directors. The CEO and directors of State Life are all appointed by the Government of Pakistan. The Principal Office of State Life is situated in Karachi, Pakistan.

== History ==
The corporation traces its origins to the Life Insurance (Nationalisation) Order of 19 March 1972, issued by the government of Prime Minister Zulfikar Ali Bhutto, which transferred the management of all life insurance business in Pakistan from the private sector to the state. In the first phase of nationalisation, between March and October 1972, the operations of 32 private life insurance companies were taken over by the government, and a Life Insurance Management Board was constituted to recommend a permanent structure for the sector. The Board's proposal led to the consolidation of the nationalized portfolios into three operating units, designated "A", "B" and "C", which were merged with effect from 1 November 1972 to form the State Life Insurance Corporation of Pakistan as the sole life insurer in the country.

The corporation continued to be governed by a board constituted under the Life Insurance (Nationalization) Order until July 2000, when the federal government reconstituted its board under the Insurance Ordinance, 2000. SLIC's monopoly over life insurance was eased over time as private insurers were given licenses, although it has retained the dominant share.

== Subsidiaries ==
State Life has the following subsidiaries:

- Alpha Insurance Company Limited
- State Life (Abdullah Haroon Road) Properties (Private) Limited
- State life (Lackie Road) Properties (Private) Limited
- State Assets Management Company Limited (SAMCO)
