= SNGPL FC =

Pakistani association football team

Sui Northern Gas
- Full name: Sui Northern Gas Pipeline Limited Football Club
- Short name: SNGPL Sports
- Founded: 2014; 12 years ago
- Dissolved: 2023; 3 years ago
- Ground: Punjab Stadium
- Capacity: 15,000
- Owner: Sui Northern Gas Pipelines Ltd.
Home colours	Away colours

Sui Northern Gas Pipelines Limited Football Club, commonly known as SNGPL Sports, served as the football section of Sui Northern Gas Pipelines Limited. Based in Lahore, The club used to compete in the Pakistan Premier League.

== History ==
Sui Northern Gas debuted in the 2014 PFF league where they were drawn in group E. They ended up in second place. In the 2015 NBP National Challenge Cup, they were drawn with KRL, K-Electric and SSGC, finishing last in their group.

The club was affected amidst the shutdown of departmental sports in Pakistan in September 2021. The SNGPL Sports Cell suspended its football, hockey and kabaddi teams in 2023 due to unavailability of funds.
