= Saadullah Khan (footballer) =

Pakistani footballer (born 1994)

Personal information
- Full name: Saadullah Khan
- Date of birth: 4 June 1994 (age 32)
- Place of birth: Pishin, Pakistan
- Height: 1.78 m (5 ft 10 in)
- Positions: Attacking midfielder; winger

Youth career
- 2008–2009: Youth Academy Pishin
- 2009–2010: Pak Elektron

Senior career*
| Years | Team | Apps | (Gls) |
| 2010–2011 | Pak Elektron | 27 | (11) |
| 2011–2014 | Khan Research Laboratories | 95 | (43) |
| 2014–2015 | Sui Southern Gas | 8 | (6) |
| 2015–2016 | B.G. Sports Club | 12 | (5) |
| 2017–2018 | Dhivehi Sifainge | | |
| 2018–2022 | Sui Southern Gas | 23 | (6) |

International career^{‡}
| 2009–2011 | Pakistan U20 | | |
| 2015 | Pakistan U23 | | |
| 2014–2020 | Pakistan | 7 | (1) |
Medal record
Khan Research Laboratories
| Winner | Pakistan Premier League | 2011 |
| Winner | Challenge Cup | 2011 |
| Winner | Pakistan Premier League | 2012 |
| Winner | Challenge Cup | 2012 |
| Runner-up | AFC President's Cup | 2013 |
| Winner | Pakistan Premier League | 2013 |
| Winner | PFF Fair Play Trophy | 2013 |
Dhivehi Sifainge
| Winner | Maldivian Third Division | 2017 |
- * Club domestic league appearances and goals as of November 2022 ‡ National team caps and goals as of 20 January 2022

Saadullah Khan (Urdu: سعد الله خان; born 4 June 1994) is a Pakistani professional footballer who plays as an attacking midfielder who has played for the national team. He is currently a free agent. Although his favored position is that of a playmaker, he can also be deployed as a striker or winger.

Khan had been praised for his speed, technique, dribbling skills, and play-making capabilities. Considered one of Pakistan's best young players in the 2010s, he had been labelled as one of the featured midfielders of South Asia in 2015.

== Early life ==
“I remember when I became Hafiz-e-Quran, it was in December 2000, I would run away and play football. My father was against the idea of me playing the sport full-time, but I persevered and didn’t give up. Slowly but surely, when he would hear people praising my skill, he allowed me to play. I know there are many children who play football with this passion, and they should not be failed on any account.”

— Saadullah in an interview with The Express Tribune.

Saadullah was born in the town of Pishin, in the Balochistan province of Pakistan. He used to study at a madrassa, and became a Hafiz in December 2000.

== Club career ==
=== Youth career ===
In 2008, Saadullah trained at Youth Academy Pishin. After a year, he played for departmental side Pak Elektron.

=== Khan Research Laboratories ===
He played for Khan Research Laboratories between 2011 and 2014, winning the Pakistan Premier League title in 2011–12, 2012–13, 2013–14 and Challenge Cup in 2011 and 2012. In the 2011 National Football Challenge Cup, Khan scored a hat-trick in a 6–0 victory against KPT as a substitute in the second half within 36 minutes in the 54th, 56th and 90th minute respectively as KRL advanced to the semifinals.

He also participated in the AFC President's Cup from 2012 to 2014. He was a member of the team which reached the 2013 AFC President's Cup final, after falling to Turkmen club Balkan FT by 0–1 in the final.

=== BG Sports ===
Saadullah then had a brief stint at Sui Southern Gas in the second-tier of Pakistani football league, before finally making his move to BG Sports Club joining the club on a six-month contract in Maldives in April 2015. Khan was one of the four foreign players allowed for the club including Spaniard David Carmona, Trinidad and Tobago international Sean Bateau, and Nigerian David Philemon. The move would also make him the first Pakistani men footballer to play in Maldives, after female international Hajra Khan.

=== Dhivehi Sifainge ===
After his stint, Khan returned to SSGC, playing in the 2016 PFF Cup which was the one the few events held in Pakistan due to Pakistan Football Federation crisis from 2015 to 2017 until the eventual ban. In August 2016, Saadullah got an offer from Hungarian team Somos SE to play in 3 friendlies. He eventually joined Dhivehi Sifainge in the 2017 Maldivian Third Division. The team got promoted to the Maldivian Second Division after defeating Sea Life SC in the penalties, following a 1–1 draw.

=== Sui Southern Gas ===
Khan returned to SSGC in the 2018–19 season following the restoration of the Pakistan Premier League after three years since 2015. In February 2019, he got an offer from Indonesia Liga 1 club Persib Bandung.

In 2021, SSGC club was closed after the shutdown of departmental sports in Pakistan. After the restoration of departmental sports in Pakistan, SSGC terminated contracts of the players of the squad on 26 August 2022, including Saadullah.

== International career ==
In 2009, Saadullah was called by the Pakistan under-19 team for the 2010 AFC U-19 Championship qualification in Tehran, under coach Gohar Zaman.

Khan made his senior debut for the Pakistan national football team in 2014 at the age of 19, in a 3–1 defeat against Lebanon. His second appearance was against Palestine. Khan scored his first international goal for the national team on his third appearance, in a friendly against Afghanistan in 2015 which was assisted by team captain Hassan Bashir. Saadullah came as a substitute for Mansoor Khan in the last 10 minutes of the match, and scored with a header in the 91st minute of the match through a free kick executed by Bashir. He also was included in the Pakistan squad for test matches against Malaysia under-19 and under-22 in Kuala Lumpur, and Osotspa FC and Thailand under-23 in Bangkok in 2015. He remained an unused substitute in the 2018 FIFA World Cup qualification against Yemen. In May 2015, Khan also participated in the 2016 AFC U-23 Championship qualification.

Saadullah missed international exposure for the next 3 years, as Pakistan was suspended from all football activities by FIFA on 10 October 2017. For three years since March 2015, Pakistan remained suspended from any international competition because of the crisis created inside the Pakistan Football Federation. Saadullah along with other national team players meanwhile participated with Pakistan during local Leisure Leagues exhibitions matches involving Brazilian star Ronaldinho and Ryan Giggs in 2017.

In 2018, Saadullah participated in the Pakistan tour to Bahrain for test matches as a preparation for the 2018 SAFF Championship, when his side returned to the international circuit after 3 years, where he scored a goal in a 2–0 victory against Sitra Club. In the 2018 SAFF Championship, Pakistan's campaign ended in the semi-finals.

In January 2020, Saadullah was named in Pakistan's squad for a two-match friendly tour in Malaysia against UKM and Felda United on 22 and 23 January respectively, which ended in a 2–2 draw and a 2–0 victory. This was before Pakistan were once again suspended from all football activities by FIFA on 7 April 2021. After the suspension was lifted on 29 June 2022, Saadullah along with his teammate Saddam Hussain were excluded from the national football team camp, as they were unable to attend the trials of the national team where they were named, following the return to international football due to their ongoing court case against their former departmental club SSGC.

== Coaching career ==
In May 2023, Saadullah became Pakistan's first player to complete an FA Level Two (UEFA) coaching course at the age of 28.

== Personal life ==
Saadullah lost his father in 2014, who had been killed by robbers in his hometown in Pishin. His younger brother Kaleemullah Khan is also a footballer.

He completed his master’s degree in International Relations in 2021.

== Career statistics ==
=== Club ===
As of match played 12 September 2023

| Club | Season | League | | | Domestic Cup | | Asian Competition (Note: Asian competitions include the AFC President's Cup) | | Total | |
| Club | Season | Division | Apps | Goals | Apps | Goals | Apps | Goals | Apps | Goals |
|---|---|---|---|---|---|---|---|---|---|---|
| Pak Elektron | 2010–11 | Pakistan Premier League | 24 | 9 | 3 | 2 | – | | 27 | 11 |
| Khan Research Laboratories | 2011–12 | Pakistan Premier League | 25 | 14 | 6 | 0 | 4 | 1 | 35 | 15 |
| Khan Research Laboratories | 2012–13 | Pakistan Premier League | 23 | 15 | 4 | 0 | 4 | 1 | 31 | 16 |
| Khan Research Laboratories | 2013–14 | Pakistan Premier League | 26 | 11 | 3 | 1 | 0 | 0 | 29 | 12 |
| Khan Research Laboratories | Total | | 98 | 49 | 16 | 3 | 8 | 2 | 122 | 54 |
| Sui Southern Gas | 2014–15 | PFF League | 5 | 6 | 3 | 0 | – | | 8 | 6 |
| BG Sports Club | 2015 | Dhivehi Premier League | 12 | 5 | – | | – | | 12 | 5 |
| Dhivehi Sifainge | 2017 | Maldivian Third Division | – | – | – | | – | | – | – |
| Sui Southern Gas | 2018–19 | Pakistan Premier League | 10 | 2 | 2 | 0 | – | | 10 | 2 |
| Sui Southern Gas | 2019–20 | Pakistan Premier League | – (Note: No league was held during 2019–20 season.) | | 5 | 2 | – | | 5 | 2 |
| Sui Southern Gas | 2020–21 | Pakistan Premier League | – (Note: No league was held during 2020–21 season.) | | 0 | 0 | – | | 0 | 0 |
| Sui Southern Gas | 2021–22 | Pakistan Premier League | 8 | 2 | – | | – | | 8 | 2 |
| Sui Southern Gas | Total | | 35 | 15 | 10 | 2 | – | | 43 | 17 |
| Career total | | | 147 | 64 | 26 | 5 | 8 | 2 | 181 | 71 |

=== International ===
As of match played 12 September 2018

Appearances and goals by national team and year
| National team | Year | Apps | Goals |
|---|---|---|---|
| Pakistan | 2014 | 2 | 0 |
| Pakistan | 2015 | 1 | 1 |
| Pakistan | 2018 | 4 | 0 |
| Total | | 7 | 1 |

==== International goals ====
Scores and results list Pakistan's goal tally first, score column indicates score after each Khan goal.

List of international goals scored by Saadullah Khan
| No. | Date | Venue | Opponent | Score | Result | Competition |
|---|---|---|---|---|---|---|
| 1 | 6 February 2015 | Punjab Stadium, Lahore, Pakistan | Afghanistan | 2–1 | 2–1 | Friendly |

== Honours ==
=== Club ===
Khan Research Laboratories

- Pakistan Premier League: 2011–12, 2012–13, 2013–14;
- Challenge Cup: 2011, 2012
- AFC President's Cup Runner-up: 2013

==== Dhivehi Sifainge ====
- Maldivian Third Division: 2017
