= Ansar Abbas =

Pakistani footballer

Personal information
- Date of birth: 15 March 1989 (age 37)
- Place of birth: Faisalabad, Pakistan
- Position: Attacking midfielder

Senior career*
Years	Team	Apps	(Gls)
2012–2024	Pakistan Army	93	(50)

International career
2011	Pakistan	1	(0)
Medal record
Pakistan Army
Third place	National Football Challenge Cup	2015
- * Club domestic league appearances and goals

Ansar Abbas (born 15 March 1989) is a Pakistani former footballer who played as an attacking midfielder for Pakistan Army. Abbas was the top scorer in the 2018–19 Pakistan Premier League, scoring 15 goals in 26 games.

== Club career ==
=== Pakistan Army ===
==== 2014–15 ====
At the 2014–15 Pakistan Premier League, Ansar scored for Pakistan Army's opening game of the season against Pakistan Railways, netting his team's third goal in the 24th minute as Pakistan Army won the match 6–0. He scored his second goal in Pakistan Army's second match of the season where he broke the deadlock in the 65th minutes as his team defeated Pakistan Air Force 1–0. Ansar went on with three consecutive matches with goal after scoring the lone goal of the match against Muslim on 15 October 2014. On 15 November 2015, Ansar scored a brace and got booked against Muslim. Ansar's last goal of the season was against relegation bound Pakistan Railways. Ansar scored his first National Football Challenge Cup goal in his second match 2015 NBP National Challenge Cup against Pakistan Navy. His second match of the cup competition was against Karachi Port Trust. Ansar scored the first penalty in penalty shootout against WAPDA as Pakistan Army won the third position match. Ansar ended his season with 8 goals in 22 matches.

==== 2018–19 ====
Ansar was made the captain of Pakistan Army for the 2018–19 Pakistan Premier League, he scored the equaliser against WAPDA in the first match of the season. On 16 November 2018, Ansar scored his first career hat-trick, scoring four goals against Baloch Nushki in a 5–0 victory. Ansar scored goals in 15th, 50th, 85th and 91st of the game. Ansar scored a brace against Karachi Port Trust on 17 December 2018 in 5–0 victory. Ansar's last goal of the season was against K-Electric in the 91st minute. Ansar ended his 2018–19 season with 15 goals in 29 appearances. He also helped the team win the 2019 National Football Challenge Cup, scoring two goals in the final.

==== Later career ====
After years of football inactivity due to the suspension on the Pakistan Football Federation by FIFA, Abbas played for the last time at the 2023 National Games, and the 2023–24 National Football Challenge Cup.

== International career ==
In 2011, Abbas represented the Pakistan under-23 team in the 2012 Summer Olympics Qualifiers, and in a test series against Palestine.

He made his sole senior international appearance at the 2011 SAFF Championship, in a match against Maldives.

== Career statistics ==
=== Club ===
As of 13 January 2019

Appearances and goals by club, season and competition
Club	Season	League			Domestic Cup		Total	
Club	Season	Division	Apps	Goals	Apps	Goals	Apps	Goals
Pakistan Army	2012–13	Pakistan Premier League	28	16	4	0	32	16
Pakistan Army	2013–14	Pakistan Premier League	23	13	4	3	27	16
Pakistan Army	2014–15	Pakistan Premier League	16	6	6	2	22	8
Pakistan Army	2018–19	Pakistan Premier League	26	15	3	0	29	15
Career total			93	50	17	5	110	55

=== International ===
Appearances and goals by national team and year
National team	Year	Apps	Goals
Pakistan	2011	1	0
Total		1	0

== Honours ==
=== Club ===
Pakistan Army

- National Football Challenge Cup: 2019

=== Individual ===
- Pakistan Premier League Golden Boot: 2018–19
