= Tehmas Khan Football Stadium =

Football stadium in Peshawar, Pakistan

- طہماس خان فٹ بال اسٹیڈیم د تهماس خان فوټبال لوبغالی
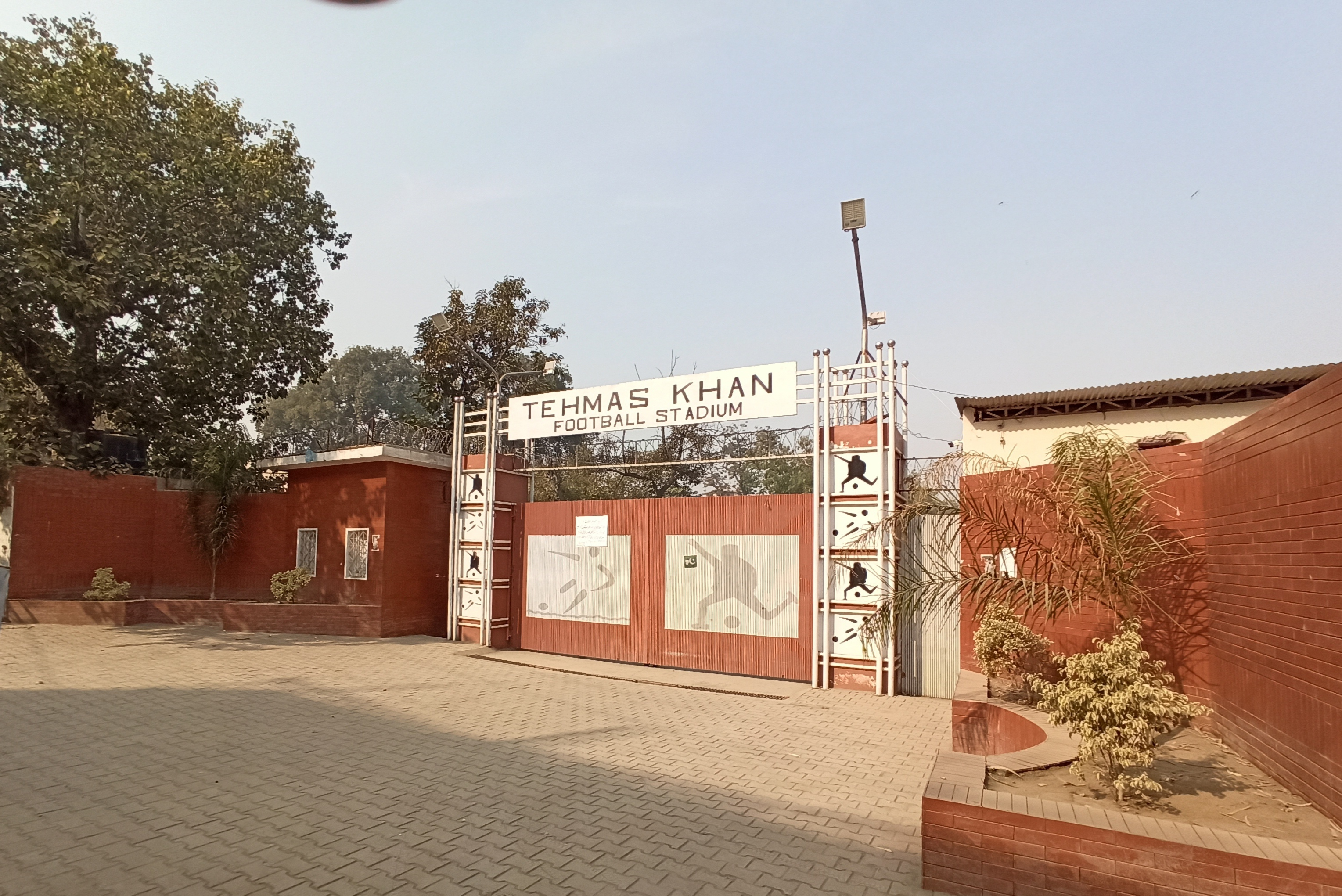
- Interactive map of Tehmas Khan Football Stadium
- Address: Shahi Bagh, Faqirabad, Peshawar, Khyber Pakhtunkhwa
- Location: Peshawar, Khyber Pakhtunkhwa
- Coordinates: 34°01′09.6″N 71°34′35.7″E
- Owner: District Government Peshawar
- Seating type: 6000
- Capacity: 6000
- Type: Grass

Construction
- Cost: Rs. 15 million

Tehmas Khan Football Stadium (sometimes called Tamas Khan Football Ground) is a historic football ground located at Faqeerabad, Peshawar, the capital of Khyber Pakhtunkhwa, Pakistan. The stadium has a capacity of around 6,000 people.

== Overview ==
The stadium is named after Tehmas Khan, a notable Peshawar football personality who died in the late 1960s, and founder of Afghan Football Club, established in 1919.

The stadium is located near the historic Shahi Bagh, adjacent to Arbab Niaz Cricket Stadium and Peshawar Gymkhana Ground. It is popular among footballers and football tournaments are regularly staged here. The stadium seats 6,000 spectators.

== Hosting history ==
The 28th edition of the National Football Challenge Cup was held here from 19 July to 4 August 2019.

== See also ==
- List of football stadiums in Pakistan
