= Shahzad Anwar =

Pakistani professional association football manager

Personal information
- Full name: Shahzad Anwar
- Date of birth: 26 April 1978 (age 48)
- Place of birth: Sargodha, Pakistan

Managerial career
- Years: Team
- 2008: Pakistan (caretaker)
- 2011: Pakistan U19
- 2013: Pakistan (caretaker)
- 2013–2014: Pakistan Air Force
- 2020: POPO FC
- 2021: Pakistan Air Force
- 2022: SKA Brasil U20
- 2022–2023: Pakistan
- 2023: Pakistan U23
- 2023–: POPO FC

Shahzad Anwar (born 26 April 1978) is a Pakistani football manager/head coach.

Anwar began his coaching career in 1997 at a local school in Sargodha, subsequently enrolling in certificate coaching courses provided by the Pakistan Football Federation. He made his way into the Pakistan national team, initially as a caretaker manager in 2008, before assuming the position of head coach in 2022. He was also named the PFF Technical Director in 2015. He is the first coach in Pakistan football to hold an AFC Pro-License.

== Career ==
Anwar began his coaching career in 1997 at a local school in Sargodha and then took certificate coaching courses offered by the Pakistan Football Federation (PFF).

He took over the charge of the Pakistan national team as the caretaker manager in 2008 for the 4–1 friendly defeat against Malaysia.

In 2011, Anwar was appointed head coach of the Pakistan national under-19 team for the 2012 AFC U-19 Championship qualification.

He was forced into the caretaker role again in the 2013 SAFF Championship, winning one game, losing one and drawing one as Pakistan exited the group stage.

At the end of 2013, Anwar was appointed as head coach of Pakistan Air Force FC. Under Anwar, PAF ended up in fourth position in the 2013–14 Pakistan Premier League season, and ended up champions in the 2014 National Football Challenge Cup. Anwar stepped down as coach of PAF in July 2014.

He was named the PFF Technical Director in 2015, but kept the job on hold in order to work on receiving his AFC Professional Coaching Diploma, the certification being an equivalent of the UEFA Pro License.

He became Pakistan’s first AFC Pro-License coach in 2017 after completing his last step, following a six-month internship at Brazil’s Nacional Atletico Clube in São Paulo. He subsequently continued serving as PFF Technical Director in 2018.

After being deprived of the chance to coach the under 23 side of Al Sadd by the Pakistan Football Federation in 2020, Anwar was hired by Islamabad club POPO FC. POPO made its professional debut in the 2020 PFF National Challenge Cup. The club impressed as a youth club, winning by 2-1 against Saif Tex in their first match. The club exited the tournament finishing third in the group stage.

In 2021, he returned to Pakistan air force to coach the side in the 2021–22 Pakistan Premier League, which was cancelled shortly after starting.

In 2022, POPO developed a partnership with Futebol Clube SKA Brasil, where two of the players from the squad, Waleed Khan and Mohammad Rizwan joined the under 20 side of the Brazilian club on a temporary basis along with Anwar as coach.

In November 2022, he assumed his role as the official head coach for a friendly against Nepal, Pakistan's first fixture in nearly three-and-a-half years because of the Pakistan Football Federation's suspension by FIFA. The friendly was eventually lost by 1–0, in a late minute goal. He also managed the under 23 team in the 2024 AFC U-23 Asian Cup qualification, handling the squad as goalkeeping coach, manager and physio in their preparation due to the lack of facilities.

Anwar was replaced with Stephen Constantine after losing eight of eight games with the national team, and returned to POPO FC as head coach at the end of 2023.

== Honours ==
=== Pakistan Air Force ===
- National Challenge Cup: 2014
