= Adeel Younas =

Pakistani footballer (born 2006)

Personal information
- Full name: Muhammad Adeel Younas
- Date of birth: 23 March 2006 (age 20)
- Place of birth: Faisalabad, Pakistan
- Position: Forward

Team information
- Current team: POPO FC

Youth career
- POPO FC

Senior career*
Years	Team	Apps	(Gls)
2021–	POPO FC		
2021	→ Pakistan Air Force (loan)	8	(0)
2024–2025	→ Khurasan FC (loan)		
2025	→ Hoandedhdhoo FC (loan)		

International career^{‡}
2023–	Pakistan U20	4	(0)
2024–	Pakistan	5	(0)
- * Club domestic league appearances and goals as of 23:00, 13 July 2024 (UTC) ‡ National team caps and goals as of 23:00, 14 October 2025 (UTC)

Muhammad Adeel Younas (born 23 March 2006) is a Pakistani footballer who plays as forward for POPO FC, and the Pakistan national team.

== Club career ==
=== POPO FC ===
Younas started his career at Islamabad club POPO FC, having previously played for the team's youth academy.

==== Loan to Pakistan Air Force ====
In August 2021, he was loaned to Pakistan Air Force for the 2021–22 Pakistan Premier League. He made 8 appearances in the 2021–22 season until the league was cancelled shortly after starting.

Upon returning to POPO FC, which had their team playing the 2023–24 PFF National Challenge Cup under the name of Mamsons Builders, he scored goals against WSTC and Pakistan Air Force, failing to advance from the group stages.

==== Loan to Khurasan FC ====
On 29 October 2024, Younas along with national teammate Kamil Marwat joined Afghanistan Champions League club Khurasan FC based in the Faryab province of Afghanistan, on a one-season deal.

==== Loan to Hoandedhdhoo FC ====
In December 2025, Younas along with teammate Ali Uzair were loaned to Hoandedhdhoo FC to compete in the Maldives Atoll Championship, the regional-level competition in Maldives football.

== International career ==
In August 2022, Younas was called up for trials with the Pakistan senior national team for a friendly against Nepal, for their first fixture in nearly three-and-a-half years because of the Pakistan Football Federation's suspension by FIFA, but failed to make it to the final squad. The next year, Younas was called to represent Pakistan at the youth level in the 2023 SAFF U-19 Championship in their first ever participation in the tournament. He helped the team pass through the semifinals after a nil goal draw against Bhutan, being the first to score in the penalty shoot-outs. The team finished as runner-up of the tournament after falling in the final against India.

He made his senior international debut on 21 March 2024 as a starter against Jordan in their 0–3 home defeat at the 2026 World Cup qualification. He was praised by the media at the end of the match due to his constant threats to the rival defence.

== Career statistics ==
=== International ===
As of 14 October 2025

Appearances and goals by national team and year
National team	Year	Apps	Goals
Pakistan	2024	3	0
Pakistan	2025	2	0
Total		5	0
