= Waleed Khan =

Pakistani footballer (born 2004)

Personal information
- Full name: Muhammad Waleed Khan
- Date of birth: 8 December 2004 (age 21)
- Place of birth: Kohat, Pakistan
- Height: 1.79 m (5 ft 10 1/2 in)
- Position: Winger

Team information
- Current team: POPO FC
- Number: 10

Youth career
- 2016–2020: POPO FC

Senior career*
Years	Team	Apps	(Gls)
2020–	POPO FC		
2021	→ Pakistan Air Force (loan)	10	(3)
2022	→ SKA Brasil U20 (loan)		

International career^{‡}
2023–	Pakistan U23	3	(0)
2022–	Pakistan	11	(0)
- * Club domestic league appearances and goals as of 14:00, 11 October 2023 (UTC) ‡ National team caps and goals as of 23:00, 26 March 2024 (UTC)

Muhammad Waleed Khan (born 4 December 2004) is a Pakistani professional footballer who plays for POPO FC and the Pakistan national team.

== Early life ==
Khan was born in Kohat in the Khyber Pakhtunkhwa province, and shifted with his family to Islamabad in 2010.

== Club career ==
=== POPO FC ===
Khan started his youth career with POPO FC in 2016. He became a regular member of the senior squad in 2020.

==== Loan to Pakistan Air Force ====
In August 2021, he was loaned to Pakistan Air Force for the 2021–22 Pakistan Premier League. He scored in the opening match of the second leg of the season at the age of 16, in a 2–2 draw against KRL in the 39th minute of the match. He also scored in a 3–0 victory against Karachi United, and a 5–0 victory against Huma, before the league was cancelled shortly after starting.

==== Loan to SKA Brasil U20 ====
In 2022, Khan along with POPO FC club compatriot Mohammad Rizwan joined the under 20 side of Brazilian club Futebol Clube SKA Brasil on a temporary basis along with the coach Shahzad Anwar.

== International career ==
In August 2022, Khan was called up for a trials with the senior national team. In November the same year, he was included in Pakistan's squad for a friendly against Nepal, Pakistan's first fixture in nearly three-and-a-half years because of the Pakistan Football Federation's suspension by FIFA. He made his senior international debut playing the full match in the eventual 0–1 away defeat. He was subsequently called for the 2023 Mauritius Four Nations Cup and the 2023 SAFF Championship in India. In October 2023 he represented Pakistan U23 in AFC U23 Asian Cup Qualifiers.

== Career statistics ==
=== International ===
As of 26 March 2024

Appearances and goals by national team and year
National team	Year	Apps	Goals
Pakistan	2022	1	0
Pakistan	2023	8	0
Pakistan	2024	2	0
Total		11	0
