= Muhammad Sadam =

Pakistani footballer (born 2005)

Personal information
- Full name: Muhammad Sadam
- Date of birth: 1 February 2005 (age 21)
- Place of birth: Faisalabad, Pakistan
- Position: Centre-back

Team information
- Current team: POPO FC

Youth career
- POPO FC

Senior career*
Years	Team	Apps	(Gls)
2023–	POPO FC		

International career^{‡}
2023	Pakistan U20	4	(0)
2023–	Pakistan	4	(0)
- * Club domestic league appearances and goals as of 23:00, 1 February 2024 (UTC) ‡ National team caps and goals as of 23:00, 11 June 2024 (UTC)

Muhammad Sadam (born 1 February 2005) is a Pakistani professional footballer who plays as a centre-back for POPO FC and the Pakistan national team.

== Early life ==
Sadam started playing football at a young age in his native village Tandlianwala. He was scouted by Islamabad club POPO FC following a recommendation by club player Muhammad Taha, and Sadam's family member who likewise played for the club and the Pakistan national youth team.

== Club career ==
=== POPO FC ===
Sadam started playing for the senior team of POPO FC in 2023.

== International career ==
In 2023, Sadam was called to represent Pakistan as captain at the youth level in the 2023 SAFF U-19 Championship in their first ever participation in the tournament. The team finished as runner-up of the tournament after falling in the final against India.

He made his senior international debut on 21 November 2023 as a substitute in the 63th minute against Tajikistan in their 1–6 home defeat.

In March 2025, he suffered a knee injury during a training session amidst receiving offers from foreign clubs, struggling for funds for treatment due to his pending dues and financial assistance from the Pakistan Football Federation.

== Personal life ==
Sadam has cited Real Madrid as his favourite club, and has described Sergio Ramos and Virgil Van Dijk as his inspiration. His elder Haji Muhammad also represented the Pakistan national team in 2009 and played for Pakistan Airlines, earning the most valuable award of the 2010 Pakistan Premier League season.

== Career statistics ==
=== International ===
As of 11 June 2024

Appearances and goals by national team and year
National team	Year	Apps	Goals
Pakistan	2023	1	0
Pakistan	2024	3	0
Total		4	0
