= Abdul Samad Khan (footballer) =

Pakistani football midfielder

Personal information
- Date of birth: 2008 or 2009 (age 17–18)
- Place of birth: Manyar, Swat district, Pakistan
- Positions: Midfielder; forward

Team information
- Current team: Qarabağ (youth)

Youth career
- 2017–2026: POPO
- 2026–: Qarabağ

International career^{‡}
Years	Team	Apps	(Gls)
2023–	Pakistan U17		(6)
2026–	Pakistan U20		
2026–	Pakistan	2	(0)
- ‡ National team caps and goals as of 03:09, 2 October 2026 (UTC)

Abdul Samad Khan (Urdu: عبدالصمد; born 2008 or 2009) is a Pakistani footballer who plays as a midfielder and forward for Qarabağ's youth team and the Pakistan national team.

== Club career ==
Born in the village of Manyar, Swat District, Khan joined the academy of POPO in 2017. In 2026, following his performances with Pakistan's youth national teams in matches against Azerbaijan, he caught the attention of local scouts, who offered him a one-week trial with Azerbaijani side Qarabağ.

He signed a two-year contract with Qarabağ on 2 August 2026, initially with the club's under-17 and under-19 teams, making him the second Pakistani youth player to move to Europe after Kaleemullah Junior joined Turkish club Sarıyer S.K. in April 2026.

== International career ==
Khan has previously captained both the Pakistan under-17 and under-20 national teams, and scored six goals for the under-17 national team. In March and April 2026, he played for the under-20 national team at the 2026 SAFF U-20 Championship in the Maldives, before playing under-17s at the UEFA Under-16 Development Tournament shortly after, where he scored against Kazakhstan in the opening match.

In September 2026, he was called up to the Pakistan senior national team squad for the 2026 FIFA ASEAN Cup. He made his senior international debut against in the eventual 2–2 draw against Philippines.

== Career statistics ==
=== International ===
As of 2 October 2026

Appearances and goals by national team and year
National team	Year	Apps	Goals
Pakistan	2026	2	0
Total		2	0
