= Mamoon Moosa Khan =

Pakistani footballer (born 2000)

Personal information
- Date of birth: 28 November 2000 (age 25)
- Place of birth: Dera Ismail Khan, Pakistan
- Positions: Centre-back; right-back

Team information
- Current team: Paro
- Number: 6

Youth career
- POPO

Senior career*
Years	Team	Apps	(Gls)
2019–	POPO		
2021–2022	→ Pakistan Air Force (loan)		
2026	→ Pakistan Air Force (loan)		
2024–2025	→ Adalat Farah (loan)		
2026–	→ Paro (loan)	10	(0)

International career^{‡}
2019	Pakistan U20	4	(0)
2023–	Pakistan U23	3	(0)
2022–	Pakistan	12	(0)
- * Club domestic league appearances and goals as of 8 September 2026 (UTC) ‡ National team caps and goals as of 7 June 2026 (UTC)

Mamoon Moosa Khan (born 28 November 2000) is a Pakistani professional footballer who plays as a centre-back for Bhutan Premier League club Paro and the Pakistan national team.

== Club career ==
=== POPO ===
Khan started his career at Islamabad club POPO, having previously played for the team's youth academy.

==== Loan to Pakistan Air Force ====
Khan was subsequently called by Pakistan Premier League departmental side Pakistan Air Force in 2021. He made 2 appearances in the 2021–22 season.

Although Khan represented POPO FC for the 2023–24 PFF National Challenge Cup under the department name Mamsons Builders, he again represented Pakistan Air Force at the 2026 National Challenge Cup.

==== Loan to Adalat Farah ====
In November 2024, Khan joined Afghanistan Champions League club Adalat Farah on a one-season loan.

==== Loan to Paro ====
In April 2026, Khan joined Bhutan Premier League club Paro.

== International career ==
Khan was first selected as vice-captain of the Pakistan under 19 team for the 2020 AFC U-19 Championship qualification. Khan received his first senior international call-up for a friendly against Nepal on 16 November 2022. He went on to debut in the 0–1 defeat. He was subsequently called for the 2023 Mauritius Four Nations Cup and the 2023 SAFF Championship in India. In October 2023 he represented Pakistan U23 in AFC U-23 Asian Cup qualification.

== Career statistics ==
=== International ===
As of 7 June 2026

Appearances and goals by national team and year
National team	Year	Apps	Goals
Pakistan	2022	1	0
Pakistan	2023	8	0
Pakistan	2024	1	0
Pakistan	2026	2	0
Total		12	0

== Honours ==
Pakistan

- Diamond Jubilee International Football Tournament: 2026
