= Ali Uzair =

Pakistani footballer

Personal information
- Full name: Ali Uzair Mahmood
- Date of birth: 14 October 1996 (age 30)
- Place of birth: Faisalabad, Pakistan
- Height: 1.78 m (5 ft 10 in)
- Position: Midfielder

Team information
- Current team: Brothers Union
- Number: 7

Senior career*
Years	Team	Apps	(Gls)
2018–2019	WAPDA	18	(1)
2019–2020	Khan Research Laboratories	0	(0)
2020–2025	WAPDA	5	(0)
2025–	POPO FC		
2025	→ Hoandedhdhoo FC (loan)		
2026	→ PWD (loan)	5	(0)
2026–	→ Brothers Union (loan)		

International career^{‡}
2019–	Pakistan	24	(0)
- * Club domestic league appearances and goals as of 30 August 2026 ‡ National team caps and goals as of 29 September 2026

Ali Uzair Mahmood (born 14 October 1996) is a Pakistani professional footballer who plays as a midfielder for Bangladesh Football League club Brothers Union and the Pakistan national team.

== Club career ==
Ali Uzair started playing in 2018 for WAPDA in the Pakistan Premier League.

In 2022, Uzair played for Larkana Leopards in the Sindh Super League, a franchise-based football league held in the province of Sindh. He helped the team finish as champions after winning against Lyari Fighters 1–0 in the final. Uzair was subsequently declared player of the tournament.

In October 2025, he joined POPO FC. Two months later, Uzair, along with teammate Adeel Younas, was loaned to Hoandedhdhoo FC to compete in the Maldives Atoll Championship, a regional-level competition in Maldives football.

In January 2026, Uzair was loaned to the Bangladeshi football club PWD SC for the second round of the Bangladesh Football League.

In August 2026, he was loaned to Brothers Union for the 2026–27 Bangladesh Football League.

== International career ==
Ali Uzair left for Cambodia to play the 2022 FIFA World Cup qualifiers. He debuted for Pakistan national football team in the 2022 FIFA World Cup qualifiers against Cambodia on 6 June 2019, coming on as a half-time substitution for Navid Rehman.

== Career statistics ==
=== Club ===
As of match played 13 January 2019

Appearances and goals by club, season and competition
Club	Season	League			Cup (Note: Includes National Football Challenge Cup)		Total	
Club	Season	Division	Apps	Goals	Apps	Goals	Apps	Goals
WAPDA	2018–19	Pakistan Premier League	18	1	5	1	23	2
WAPDA	Total		18	1	5	1	23	2
Career total			18	1	5	1	23	2

=== International ===
As of 29 September 2026

Appearances and goals by national team and year
National team	Year	Apps	Goals
Pakistan	2019	2	0
Pakistan	2023	11	0
Pakistan	2024	4	0
Pakistan	2025	4	0
Pakistan	2026	3	0
Total		24	0

== Honours ==
=== WAPDA ===
- PFF National Challenge Cup: 2020, 2023–24
