= Usman Ali (footballer) =

Pakistani footballer

Personal information
- Full name: Usman Ali
- Date of birth: 10 June 2004 (age 22)
- Place of birth: Malakand, Pakistan
- Position: Goalkeeper

Team information
- Current team: PWD

Youth career
- POPO FC

Senior career*
Years	Team	Apps	(Gls)
2020–2024	POPO FC		
2021–2022	→ Huma (loan)	6	(0)
2024–2026	Khan Research Laboratories		
2026–	PWD		

International career^{‡}
2020	Pakistan U16	3	(0)
2023	Pakistan U23	1	(0)
- * Club domestic league appearances and goals as of 03:47, 16 January 2024 (UTC) ‡ National team caps and goals as of 23:00, 16 January 2024 (UTC)

Usman Ali (born 10 June 2004) is a Pakistani footballer who plays as a goalkeeper for Bangladesh Football League club PWD.

== Club career ==
=== POPO FC ===
Ali started playing professionally in 2020 for POPO FC, having previously played for the team's youth academy.

==== Loan to Huma ====
In 2021, he was loaned to Huma FC for the 2021–22 Pakistan Premier League. He made 6 appearances in the 2021–22 season until the league was cancelled shortly after starting.

=== Khan Research Laboratories ===
On 21 February 2024, Ali moved to departmental side Khan Research Laboratories, formerly being scouted by them in 2020 at the age of 16.

=== PWD ===
In January 2026, Ali joined the Bangladeshi football club PWD SC for the second round of the Bangladesh Football League.

== International career ==
Ali represented Pakistan at the youth level in 2020 AFC U-16 Championship qualification. He went on to make three appearances in the campaign.

In December 2022, Ali was called up for trials with the senior national team. He was called in September 2023 for the 2024 AFC U-23 Asian Cup qualification where he made one appearance against Palestine, as Pakistan exited the group losing three games in the group. In October few months later, he was included in Pakistan senior squad for the 2026 FIFA World Cup qualification against Cambodia.
