= Manyar, Swat district =

Manyar
- Village
- Location in Pakistan
- Coordinates: 34°43′N 72°16′E
- Country: Pakistan
- Province: Khyber Pakhtunkhwa
- District: Swat

Population (1998)
  - Total: 15,000
- Time zone: UTC+5 (PST)

Manyar (pop. [1998] c. 15,000) is a village in Swat District, Khyber Pakhtunkhwa province, Pakistan. It is situated between the two villages of Ghaligay and Tindodag, 12 km southeast of Mingora. Its Union Council constituency is Ghaligay, Tehsil Barikot, District Swat. The village is a major tourist destination for its view of the sea, surrounding meadows, and hills. There is a beautiful and big Masjid called Cheena Masjid located in Barpalow in which the spring water is flowing for ablution which increases more the beauty of this village. The secret of Manyar is also the mountains of manyar, because there are many beautiful places where people go for trekking.

The Manyar include Barpalow, Kozpalow, Gharib Abad, Kashala and Krash Machine places. There are about 16 Masajids in Manyar village.

Football is a major sport of Manyar. The Manyar Eleven team is a winner of many tournaments played at the district level on large grounds.

Manyar was originally settled by Hindus, and is now the home of Pathans, people who speak Pashto and Pashto remains the local language. The main source of local income is farming. The main religion of the region is Islam.

Manyar is mainly inhabited by Pashtuns.

Among Pashtuns, some of its tribes are Sher Khan khel, Natu khel, Ali khan Khel, Lakhkar Khel, Qazi Khel (Qazian), Busa khel, Nadar khel, Akhund khel.

Some other prominent tribes are Shiekhan, Shahibzadgan, Mulan.

Manyar has dardic (gujjars) population as well in its hilly areas.
