= 2023 SAFF U-19 Championship =

Tournament details
- Host country: Nepal
- Dates: 21–30 September 2023
- Teams: 6 (from 1 sub-confederation)
- Venue: 1 (in 1 host city)

Final positions
- Champions: India (3rd title)
- Runners-up: Pakistan

Tournament statistics
- Matches played: 9
- Goals scored: 26 (2.89 per match)
- Attendance: 23,233 (2,581 per match)
- Top scorer(s): (Bhutan) Jigme Namgyel (India) Gwgmsar Goyary (Nepal) Samir Tamang (3 goals each)
- Best player: (India) Manglenthang Kipgen
- Best goalkeeper: (India) Lionel Daryl Rymmei
- Fair play award: Bhutan

The 2023 SAFF U-19 Championship was the 5th edition of the SAFF U-19 Championship, an international football competition for men's under-19 national teams organized by South Asian Football Federation (SAFF). It took place from 21–30 September 2023 in Kathmandu, Nepal.

India are the defending champions, who won their second title in 2022 by defeating Bangladesh in the final on 5 August 2022.

== Venue ==
On 22 July 2023, SAFF announced the tournament will be held at the Dasharath Rangasala in Kathmandu, Nepal.

Kathmandu
Dasharath Rangasala
Capacity: 15,500
2023 SAFF U-19 Championship

== Teams ==
Sri Lanka are ineligible for participation as they are suspended by FIFA. Other six SAFF teams are eligible to participate.

Team	Appearances in the SAFF U-19 Championship	Previous best performance
Bangladesh	5th	Runners-up (2017, 2019, 2022)
Bhutan	4th	Fourth place (2017, 2019)
India	5th	Winners (2019, 2022)
Maldives	5th	Third place (2019)
Nepal (Host)	5th	Winners (2015, 2017)
Pakistan	1st	–

=== Draw ===
The draw was held in BFF House in Dhaka, Bangladesh on 22 July 2023 at 12:00 BST (UTC+6).

Pot 1	Pot 2	Pot 3
Nepal (hosts); India	Maldives; Bhutan	Bangladesh; Pakistan

=== Draw result ===
Group A
Pos	Team
A1	Nepal
A2	Maldives
A3	Pakistan

Group B
Pos	Team
B1	India
B2	Bhutan
B3	Bangladesh

== Match officials ==
Referees

- (Maldives) Nadheem Hussain
- (India) Astha Aditya Purkay
- (Bangladesh) Sabuj Kumar Das
- (Pakistan) Adnan Anjum
- (Nepal) Nabin Maharjan
- (Bhutan) Pema Tshewang

Assistant referees

- (Maldives) Shaheem Hussain
- (Nepal) Yadhav Kishan Kanaya
- (India) M Sawant Dipesh
- (Bhutan) Passang Passang
- (Bangladesh) Sharif SM Junayed
- (Pakistan) Mehboob Ali

== Players eligibility ==
Players born on or after 1 January 2005 are eligible to compete in the tournament. Each team has to register a squad of minimum 16 players and maximum 23 players, minimum two of whom must be goalkeepers.

== Group stage ==
- Times listed are UTC+05:45 Nepal Standard Time (NST).

Key to colours in group tables
Group winners and runners-up advance to the semi-finals

Tiebreakers

Teams are ranked according to points (3 points for a win, 1 point for a draw, 0 points for a loss), and if tied on points, the following tiebreaking criteria are applied, in the order given, to determine the rankings.

1. Points in head-to-head matches among tied teams;
2. Goal difference in head-to-head matches among tied teams;
3. Goals scored in head-to-head matches among tied teams;
4. If more than two teams are tied, and after applying all head-to-head criteria above, a subset of teams are still tied, all head-to-head criteria above are reapplied exclusively to this subset of teams;
5. Goal difference in all group matches;
6. Goals scored in all group matches;
7. Penalty shoot-out if only two teams are tied and they met in the last round of the group;
8. Disciplinary points (yellow card = 1 point, red card as a result of two yellow cards = 3 points, direct red card = 3 points, yellow card followed by direct red card = 4 points);
9. Drawing of lots.

=== Group A ===
Pos	Team	Pld	W	D	L	GF	GA	GD	Pts	Qualification
1	Pakistan	2	1	1	0	2	1	+1	4	Qualified for Knockout stage
2	Nepal (H)	2	1	0	1	4	2	+2	3	Qualified for Knockout stage
3	Maldives	2	0	1	1	2	5	−3	1	

Source: GSA
(H) Hosts
21 September 2023
17:30

Pakistan	1–0	Nepal
Ali Zafar 76'	Report

Dashrath Stadium, Kathmandu
Attendance: 3,500
Referee: Astha Aditya Dipesh (India)

23 September 2023
13:30

Maldives	1–1	Pakistan
Shanaan Rasheed Rashad 39'	Report	Shah Jahan 84'

Dashrath Stadium, Kathmandu
Attendance: 212
Referee: Sabuj Kumar Das (Bangladesh)

25 September 2023
13:30

Nepal	4–1	Maldives
Prashant Laksam 17'; Samir Tamang 30', 90+6'; Nirajan Dhami 88'	Report	Adam Layaan Rasheed 58'

Dashrath Stadium, Kathmandu
Attendance: 3,709
Referee: Pema Tshewang (Bhutan)

=== Group B ===
Pos	Team	Pld	W	D	L	GF	GA	GD	Pts	Qualification
1	India	2	2	0	0	5	1	+4	6	Qualified for Knockout stage
2	Bhutan	2	1	0	1	5	5	0	3	Qualified for Knockout stage
3	Bangladesh	2	0	0	2	3	7	−4	0	

Source: GSA
21 September 2023
13:30

Bangladesh	0–3	India
	Report	Gwgmsar Goyary 1'; Naoba Meitei Pangabam 45+5'; Arjun Singh Oinam 90'

Dashrath Stadium, Kathmandu
Attendance: 201
Referee: Nadheem Ali (Maldives)

23 September 2023
17:30

Bhutan	4–3	Bangladesh
Jigme Namgyel 32', 68'; Kingzang Tenzi 45+3'; Rinzin Dorji 84'	Report	Md Rubel Shaikh 3'; Asadul Molla 30'; Razu Ahmed Zisan 55'

Dashrath Stadium, Kathmandu
Attendance: 300
Referee: Adnan Anjum (Pakistan)

25 September 2023
17:30

India	2–1	Bhutan
Gwgmsar Goyary 37'; Ricky Meetei Haobam 64'	Report	Jigme Namgyel 20'

Dashrath Stadium, Kathmandu
Attendance: 425
Referee: Nabin Maharjan (Nepal)

== Knockout stage ==
=== Bracket ===
Semi-finals
27 September – Kathmandu
Pakistan (p)	0 (6)
Bhutan	0 (5)
27 September – Kathmandu
India (p)	1 (3)
Nepal	1 (2)

Final
30 September – Kathmandu
Pakistan	0
India	3

=== Semi-finals ===
27 September 2023
13:30

Pakistan	0–0	Bhutan
	Report
Penalties
Adeel Younas (penalty scored); Shah Jahan (penalty scored); Ali Zafar (penalty scored); Khurshid Alam (penalty scored); Muhammad Sadam (penalty scored); Kamil Ahmed Khan (penalty scored)	6–5	Kinzang Tenzing (penalty scored); Jigme Namgyel (penalty scored); Rinzin Dorji (penalty scored); Ugyen Dorji (penalty scored); Pema Zangpo (penalty scored); Tshetrim Pelzang (penalty missed)

Dashrath Stadium, Kathmandu
Attendance: 315
Referee: Astha Aditya Dipesh (India)
27 September 2023
17:30

India	1–1	Nepal
Sahil Khurshid 26'	Report	Samir Tamang 74'
Penalties
Arjun Singh Oinam (penalty scored); Dinesh Singh Soubam (penalty missed); Gwgmsar Goyary (penalty scored); Ricky Meetei Haobam (penalty missed); Manglenthang Kipgen (penalty scored)	3–2	Ashwin Ghorasainee (penalty scored); Prashant Laksam (penalty missed); Kushal Deuba (penalty scored); Lachhu Thapa (penalty missed); Bikram Tamang (penalty missed)

Dashrath Stadium, Kathmandu
Attendance: 12,656
Referee: Adnan Anjum (Pakistan)

=== Final ===
30 September 2023
17:30

Pakistan	0–3	India
	Report	Manglenthang Kipgen 64', 85'; Gwgmsar Goyary 90+5'

Dashrath Stadium, Kathmandu
Attendance: 1,615
Referee: Nadheem Ali (Maldives)

== Winner ==
5th SAFF U-19 Championship 2023 Champions

India
Third title

== Awards ==
The following awards were given at the conclusion of the tournament:

Fair Play Award	Best goalkeeper	Most valuable player
Bhutan	(India) Lionel Daryl Rymmei	(India) Manglenthang Kipgen

== Statistics ==
=== Goalscorers ===
There have been 26 goals scored in 9 matches, for an average of 2.89 goals per match.

3 goals

- (Bhutan) Jigme Namgyel
- (India) Gwgmsar Goyary
- (Nepal) Samir Tamang

2 goals

- (India) Manglenthang Kipgen

1 goal

- (Bangladesh) Md Rubel Shaikh
- (Bangladesh) Asadul Molla
- (Bangladesh) Razu Ahmed Zisan
- (Bhutan) Kingzang Tenzi
- (Bhutan) Rinzin Dorji
- (India) Ricky Meetei Haobam
- (India) Sahil Khurshid
- (India) Naoba Meitei Pangabam
- (India) Arjun Singh Oinam
- (Maldives) Shanaan Rasheed Rashad
- (Maldives) Adam Layaan Rasheed
- (Nepal) Prashant Laksham
- (Nepal) Nirajan Dhami
- (Pakistan) Ali Zafar
- (Pakistan) Shah Jahan

Source: GSA

== Final standing ==
Rank	Team	Pld	W	D	L
1st place, gold medalist(s)	India	4	4	0	0
2nd place, silver medalist(s)	Pakistan	4	2	1	1
3rd place, bronze medalist(s)	Nepal	3	1	0	2
4	Bhutan	3	1	0	2
5	Maldives	2	0	1	1
6	Bangladesh	2	0	0	2

== See also ==
2023 in SAFF
Men's
U-16 Championship	U-19 Championship	Senior Championship (Final)
Women's
U-17 Championship	U-20 Championship	

- 2022 SAFF Women's Championship
- 2022 AFF Championship
- 2022 EAFF E-1 Football Championship
- 2023 CAFA Nations Cup
- 2023 WAFF Championship
- 2023 AFC Asian Cup
- 2026 FIFA World Cup qualification (AFC)
