= Mingora, Swat =

Mingora
- Tehsil
- Country: Pakistan
- Province: Khyber Pakhtunkhwa
- District: Swat

Population (2017)
  - Total: 24,471
- Time zone: UTC+5 (PST)

Mingora is an administrative subdivision (Tehsil) of Swat District in the Khyber Pakhtunkhwa province of Pakistan.

Swat District has eight tehsils: Mingora, Matta Tehsil, Khwazakhela Tehsil, Barikot Tehsil, Babuzai Tehsil, Kabal Tehsil, Charbagh Tehsil, and Bahrain Tehsil. Each tehsil consists of some number of Union councils. There are 65 union councils in Swat District, 56 rural and nine urban.

== See also ==
- Manyar, Swat district
