= UEFA coaching licences =

Association football coaching licences mandated by UEFA

The UEFA coaching licences are documents testifying credentials of managers/ coaches among members of UEFA. The governing body for football in Europe mandates several licences, each valid for coaching at a certain level. These include the UEFA Pro Licence, the UEFA A Licence, the UEFA B Licence and UEFA C Licence. They are issued by each UEFA member state's football federation and are valid for three years.

== Types ==
=== UEFA Pro Licence ===
The UEFA Pro Licence is the highest coaching certification available in Europe and generally follows the completion of the 'B' and 'A' licences. A Pro Licence is required for anyone who wishes to manage a football club in the top tier of any European nation's league system on a permanent basis, i.e. more than 12 weeks (the amount of time an unqualified caretaker manager is allowed to take control). Such a licence is also required to manage in the UEFA Champions League, the UEFA Europa League and the UEFA Conference League.

A UEFA Pro Licence from North Macedonia

=== UEFA A Licence ===
The UEFA A Licence is one level below the UEFA Pro Licence and allows holders to be head coaches of youth teams up to age 18, reserve teams (also known as 'B' teams) for top-flight clubs, and men's professional second-tier clubs.

=== UEFA B Licence ===
The UEFA B Licence is one level below the UEFA A Licence, and allows holders to be head coaches of amateur clubs, youth teams up to age 16, and assistant coaches for professional clubs.

=== UEFA C Licence and FA Level 1 ===
The C License is one level below the B License. This license replaced the FA Level 2 certificate, which was previously provided by local football associations. The FA Level 1 certificate, now known as the "Introduction to Coaching Football" course, serves as a prerequisite for the C License. Some football associations refer to this entry-level coaching qualification as a "D License." When applying for the C License, completing the FA Level 1 course is often required.

== See also ==
- AFC Professional Coaching Diploma: the coaching licence of the Asian Football Confederation equivalent to the UEFA Pro Licence.
- Manager (association football)
