= POPO FC =

Pakistani football club

POPO
- Full name: POPO Football Club
- Short name: PFC
- Founded: 2012; 14 years ago
- Ground: F-11 Multipurpose Ground
- Chairman: Haris Haroon
- Head coach: Shahzad Anwar
Home colours	Away colours

POPO Football Club, is a Pakistani professional football club based in Islamabad, Pakistan.

Primarily focused on grassroots football development and consisting of several youth teams, the club is often regarded as one of the most successful football academies in the country.

== History ==
The club was founded in 2012 by a lecturer at Islamic University’s business programme Haris Haroon. The club was named after his nickname given to him by his students during his tutoring days. Initially, they took part in various local tournaments in Islamabad, but later on settled an academy for young players.

The club produced a number of players for both the Pakistan U-19 and U-16 teams, for the 2020 AFC U-19 Championship qualification and the 2020 AFC U-16 Championship qualification respectively in 2019. The club subsequently hired Pakistan's first AFC Pro License holding coach Shahzad Anwar.

POPO made his professional debut in the 2020 PFF National Challenge Cup. The club impressed as a youth club, winning by 2–1 against Saif Tex in their first match. The club exited the tournament finishing third in the group stage.

In 2022, the club developed a partnership with Futebol Clube SKA Brasil, where two of the players from the squad, Waleed Khan and Mohammad Rizwan joined the under 20 side of the Brazilian club on a temporary basis along with the coach Shahzad Anwar.

== Stadium ==
The F-11 Multipurpose Ground located in the F-11 Sector of Islamabad serve as the team home ground.

== Players (2023) ==
Note: Flags indicate national team as defined under FIFA eligibility rules; some limited exceptions apply. Players may hold more than one non-FIFA nationality.

No.	Pos.	Nation	Player
—	GK	PAK	Usman Ali
—	GK	PAK	Haroon
—	GK	PAK	Saqib
—	DF	PAK	Muhammad Sadam
—	DF	PAK	Mamoon Moosa Khan (captain)
—	DF	PAK	Abdul Razzak
—	DF	PAK	Muhammad Raheel
—	DF	PAK	Kamil Ahmad Khan
—	DF	PAK	Ibrahim
—	MF	PAK	Mohammad Taha

No.	Pos.	Nation	Player
—	MF	PAK	Mohammad Hayyan Khattak
—	MF	PAK	Hanif
—	MF	PAK	Nasir
—	MF	PAK	Naqeeb
—	FW	PAK	Waleed Khan
—	FW	PAK	Adeel Younas
—	FW	PAK	Faraz mehmood
—	FW	PAK	Khurshid Alam
—	FW	PAK	Tajir
—	FW	PAK	Adnan
