= AFC Professional Coaching Diploma =

Coaching accreditation issued by the Asian Football Confederation

The AFC Professional Coaching Diploma, also known as the AFC Pro-Diploma, is the highest level of coaching accreditation issued by the Asian Football Confederation (AFC), equivalent to the UEFA Pro Licence. The diploma was first awarded by the AFC in 2001.

== Structure ==
Students are required to have completed the B coaching certificate. Study for the diploma involves undertaking at least 220 hours of coursework. The AFC proposed that coaches of all national professional leagues teams must have the diploma.
