= Pakistan national football team =

Men's association football team

Pakistan
- Nickname(s): شاہین, Shāhīn (The Falcons)
- Association: Pakistan Football Federation (PFF)
- Confederation: AFC (Asia)
- Sub-confederation: SAFF (South Asia)
- Head coach: Nolberto Solano
- Captain: Abdullah Iqbal
- Most caps: Haroon Yousaf (49)
- Top scorer: Muhammad Umer (18)
- Home stadium: Jinnah Stadium
- FIFA code: PAK
First colours	Second colours

FIFA ranking
- Current: 197 (18 November 2026)
- Highest: 141 (February 1994)
- Lowest: 205 (June 2019)

First international
- Iran 5–1 Pakistan (Tehran, Iran; 27 October 1950)

Biggest win
- Pakistan 7–0 Thailand (Kuala Lumpur, Malaysia; 5 August 1960); Pakistan 9–2 Guam (Taipei, Taiwan; 6 April 2008); Pakistan 7–0 Bhutan (Dhaka, Bangladesh; 8 December 2009)

Biggest defeat
- Iran 9–1 Pakistan (Tehran, Iran; 12 March 1969); Pakistan 0–8 Iraq (Amman, Jordan; 28 May 1993)

AFC Challenge Cup
- Appearances: 1 (first in 2006)
- Best result: Group stage (2006)

Asian Games
- Appearances: 5 (first in 1954)
- Best result: Sixth place (1954)

SAFF Championship
- Appearances: 13 (first in 1993)
- Best result: Runners-up (2026)

ASEAN Cup (as guest)
- Appearances: 1 (first in 2026)
- Best result: Group stage (2026)
Medal record
Men's Football
SAFF Championship
Silver medal – second place	2026 Dhaka	Team
Bronze medal – third place	1997 Kathmandu	Team
South Asian Games
Gold medal – first place	1989 Islamabad	Team
Gold medal – first place	1991 Colombo	Team
Bronze medal – third place	1987 Calcutta	Team
- Website: pff.com.pk

The Pakistan national football team (Urdu: پاکستان قومی فٹ بال ٹیم) represents Pakistan in men's international football in FIFA-authorised events and is controlled by the Pakistan Football Federation, the governing body for football in Pakistan. Pakistan became a state member of FIFA in 1948 and joined the Asian Football Confederation in 1954.

Pakistan's national team debuted in 1950 and has yet to qualify for the FIFA World Cup finals. Pakistan has never qualified for the AFC Asian Cup, although on regional level in South Asia, the team has won the 1952 Asian Quadrangular Football Tournament, and has achieved gold at the South Asian Games in 1989 and 1991.

Pakistan had a brief period of emergence in the 1950s and early 1960s, but as the global popularity of football surged, the sport's standing in Pakistan deteriorated. The standard achieved in the early years could not be maintained because of lack of organisation of the game and the administration's lack of attention to football. Football has also struggled to gain popularity in Pakistan largely due to the heavy influence of cricket in South Asia.

== History ==
=== Early years (1950s) ===
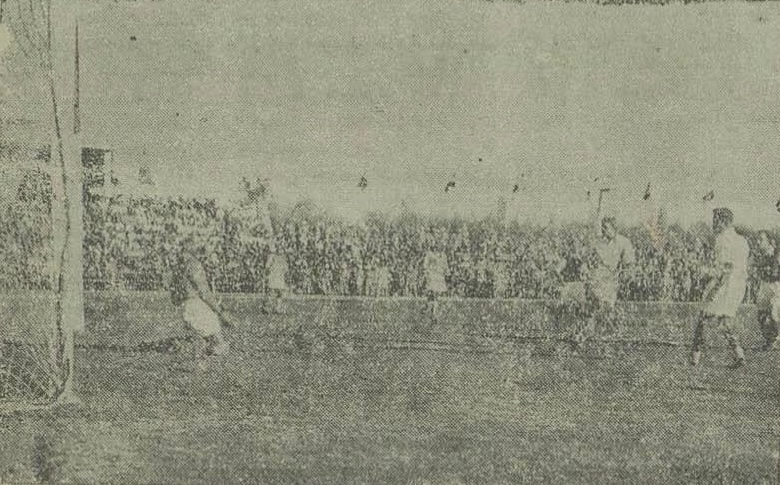
Pakistan (in light kit) in their debut match against Iran on 27 October 1950

Shortly after the creation of Pakistan in 1947, the Pakistan Football Federation (PFF) was created, and Muhammad Ali Jinnah became its first Patron-in-Chief. PFF received recognition from FIFA in early 1948. Following the conclusion of the inaugural Inter-Provincial Football Tournament in 1948, the Pakistan Football Federation planned to send a national team to compete at the 1948 Summer Olympics. However, for reasons that remain unclear, the team ultimately did not participate in the tournament.

In 1950, Pakistan embarked upon a tour to Iran and Iraq. The national team faced Iran in their first official international game in Tehran on 27 October 1950, losing the game 1–5, with Abdul Wahid Durrani scoring the lone goal. The match also took place during the Shah of Iran's birthday celebrations. Reportedly the Pakistan national team played the match barefoot, which was the norm back in South Asia. Pakistan also engaged in unofficial friendly matches during the tour, losing against Tehran's Taj by 1–6 scoreline and drew 2–2 against a team from Isfahan. The following month, the team toured the country of Iraq, where due to the Iraq Football Association's inability to gather a full national team, Pakistan played an unofficial friendly against the club Al-Haras Al-Malaki, which resulted in a 1–1 draw.

Pakistan's starting line-up in 2–3–5 formation at the 1952 Asian Quadrangular Football Tournament match against India
Coach: Mohammad Shahjahan

Pakistan's next international outing came in the 1952 Asian Quadrangular Football Tournament. They finished as joint champions alongside India after finishing with the same points in the table. Pakistan was awarded the shared trophy for the first six months after winning a coin toss. The same year, Pakistan played a friendly against Iran in home venue, with the match ending in a goalless draw.

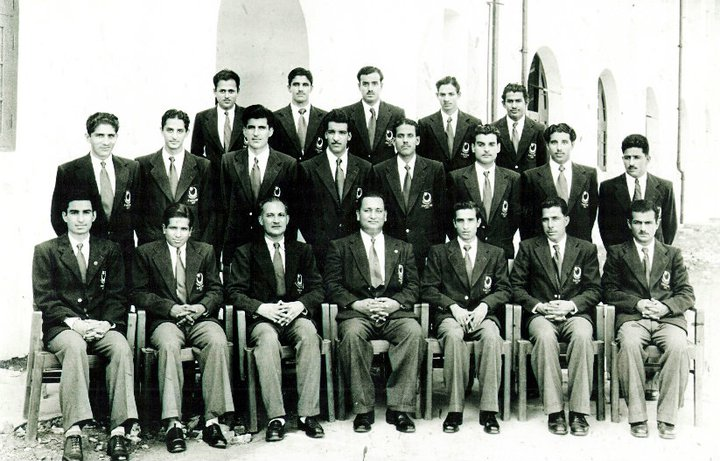
Pakistan national team pictured in 1953.

During the early 1950s, Pakistan played internationally in the following Asian Quadrangular Football Tournament editions which were played in Burma in 1953, India in 1954, East Pakistan in 1955. The team made its first appearance at the 1954 Asian Games in Manila, Philippines, where on 2 May 1954, Masood Fakhri had most notably become the first Pakistani player to score a hat-trick in an international match, as Pakistan thumped Singapore 6–2 in a group match. However, Pakistan failed to advance out of the group stages, after losing to Burma.

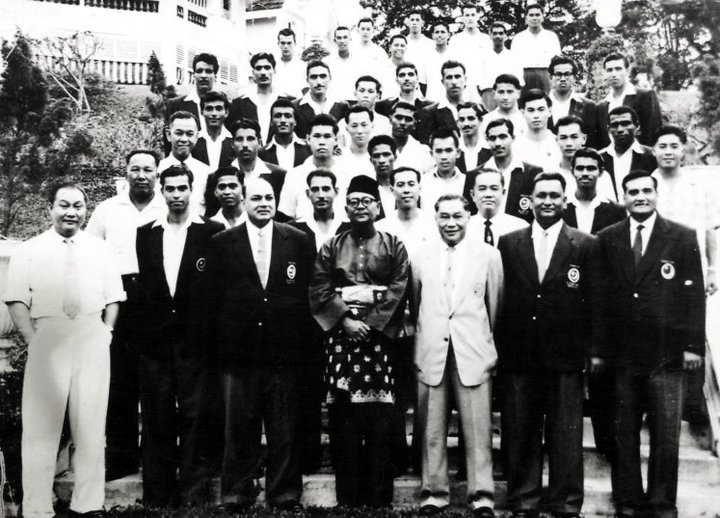
Pakistan and Malaya national teams for the 1958 Asian Games pictured with Tunku Abdul Rahman before their participation in the tournament

The Pakistan Football Federation became one of the 13 founding members of the Asian Football Confederation on 8 May 1954. Initially scheduled to play against Israel in the inaugural 1956 AFC Asian Cup qualifiers, the team withdrew along with Afghanistan due to reluctance to host the Israeli team. The same year, the team toured Ceylon, Singapore, and China, and two years later featured at the 1958 Asian Games held in Japan.

In 1959 after a tour to Burma, Pakistan finally decided to participate in the 1960 Asian Cup qualifiers hosted by India in Kerala, where Pakistan faced Iran, India and Israel twice each in the qualifiers. Although Israel managed to qualify by topping the group, Pakistan achieved memorable victories over Iran by 4–1, as well as a win over arch-rivals India by 0–1, and managing to secure a 2–2 draw against Israel, finishing in third place in the group, ahead of hosts India, and behind Iran and Israel.

=== Emergence (1960s) ===

Pakistan's starting line-up in 2–3–5 formation at the 1962 Merdeka Tournament final against Indonesia
Coach: George Ainsley

Pakistan had participated in various friendly tournaments in the early 1960s, with the Merdeka Cup hosted in Malaysia after the country first participation in 1960. Pakistan recorded a 7–0 victory over Thailand, and a 3–1 win over Japan. Two years later in the 1962 Merdeka Tournament, Pakistan ended runner up after falling to Singapore by 1–2 in the final.

During the China national team tour in Pakistan in 1963, the first test in Dhaka in East Pakistan (now Bangladesh) ended in a 0–0 tie. The second match in Peshawar ended in a 3–2 victory for Pakistan, with the third fixture in Lahore ending in another 1–1 draw. The final fourth match in Karachi ended in a 2–0 defeat for Pakistan. The 1964 Summer Olympics qualification the same year included a 4–1 loss in Iran and a 1–0 win in Pakistan. Pakistan visited China in 1964 playing several test matches against local sides, including a 2–0 victory against the China national team.

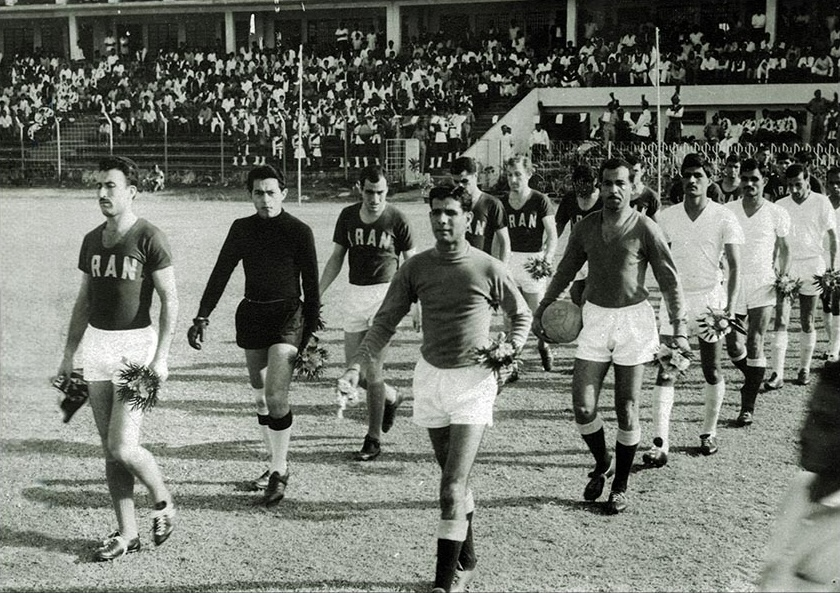
Pakistan vs Iran during the 1967 RCD Cup

In 1965 after a tour to Ceylon involving several test matches, they played in the inaugural 1965 RCD Cup and finished third. In the 1960s, the national team also hosted several teams from Soviet Union and Dallas Tornados for unofficial test matches. In March 1967, the national team played a four-match test series against Saudi Arabia in Lyallpur, Sukkur, Hyderabad and Karachi, winning and losing once, and drawing twice. Months later, Pakistan lost their Asian Cup qualifiers against Burma and Cambodia and drew their final match against India. Pakistan also entered the 1968 Merdeka Tournament, but did not feature in it, withdrawing earlier before the tournament started.

They then hosted the second 1967 RCD Cup and finished third. In 1969, they travelled to Iran to take part in the 1969 Friendship Cup, in which they had a 2–1 win against Iraq and a record 9–1 defeat by Iran. This was before another disappointment at the 1969 and 1970 RCD Cup editions.

Despite the game's growth in the 1960s, Pakistan did not actively participate in the Asian Games football tournaments held in 1962, 1966, and 1970 due to financial constraints. The World Cup qualifiers followed a similar pattern, with Pakistan missing crucial matches because of a lack of interest from the federation and insufficient government support.

=== Dark era (1970s) ===
Following the 1971 Bangladesh Liberation War, East Pakistan became the independent nation of Bangladesh. This separation also led to the loss of the Dhaka First Division League, which had provided a higher standard of competition than was typically found in West Pakistan, often drawing leading players from West Pakistan and functioned alongside the National Football Championship as a key competitive platform.

The national team did not compete again until 1973, when the national team toured the far east, which included several test matches against local teams and a friendly against China ending in a 4–7 defeat.

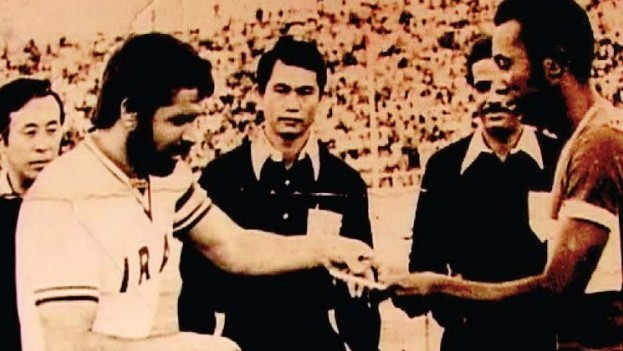
Pakistani captain Abdul Ghafoor with Iran national team captain Parviz Ghelichkhani (left) during the 1974 Asian Games

In the early 1970s the national side participated at the 1974 RCD Cup and the 1974 Asian Games. The most notable result in this period included a 2–2 draw against Turkey at the former and a 5–1 win against Bahrain at the latter. Two years later, Pakistan held the inaugural 1976 Quaid-e-Azam International Tournament in Karachi. Earlier that same year, Pakistan participated in the third edition of the Afghanistan Republic Day Festival Cup, finishing in fifth place.

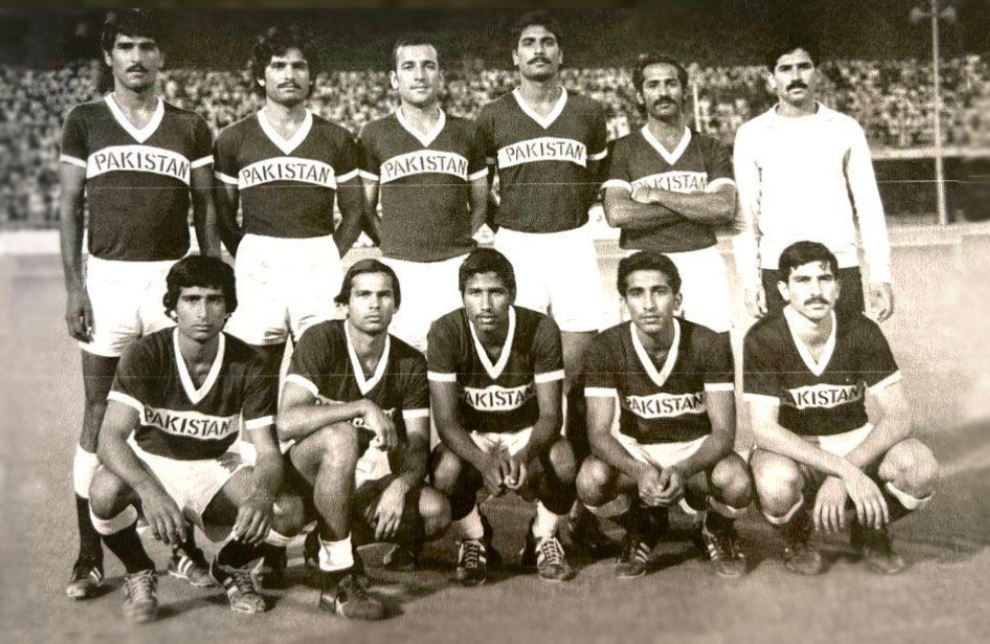
The Pakistan national team pictured in 1978 before their match against Saudi Arabia

In 1978, Pakistan participated in the "Saudi Arabia Football Federation International Tournament", the team lost their first match against Saudi Arabia 0–6. The following match against South Korea B ended in another loss, with a scoreline of 0–5, the final match against Kenya ended in 3–8 defeat.

=== Resurgence and South Asian success (1980–1989) ===
After several years of competitive football inactivity, the national team was invited for the 1981 Merdeka Tournament, however, the team declined the invitation, withdrawing from the tournament. Instead, they participated in the 1981 King's Cup, Pakistan secured a goalless draw against Semarang from Indonesia. After a loss to Thailand, they gained a 3–2 victory against Malaysia and although they lost a close game against 1 August from China, they were able to win 1–0 in their final game against Singapore.

Pakistan hosted the 1982 Quaid-e-Azam International Tournament involving Iran, Bangladesh, Oman, Nepal and the second string Pakistan Blues. The Green Shirts started off with a 2–0 win over Nepal. They then lost to Iran, but came back and beat Bangladesh 2–1. The last game against Oman ended nil-nil and Pakistan ended at the third position behind the Pakistan Blues team. In 1984, the national team participated at the 1984 Merdeka Tournament, and later at the 1984 AFC Asian Cup qualification, losing 4 out of 5 games, the only victory coming against North Yemen 4–1.

The national team hosted another 1985 Quaid-e-Azam International Tournament, this time inviting North Korea XI, Indonesia Youth, Bangladesh and Nepal. A goalless draw against the North Koreans boosted the side, as they beat Nepal by one goal. However, they lost in the final two games against Bangladesh and Indonesia. In the 1985 South Asian Games, Pakistan ended fourth after losing a penalty shoot out to Nepal in the third place match.

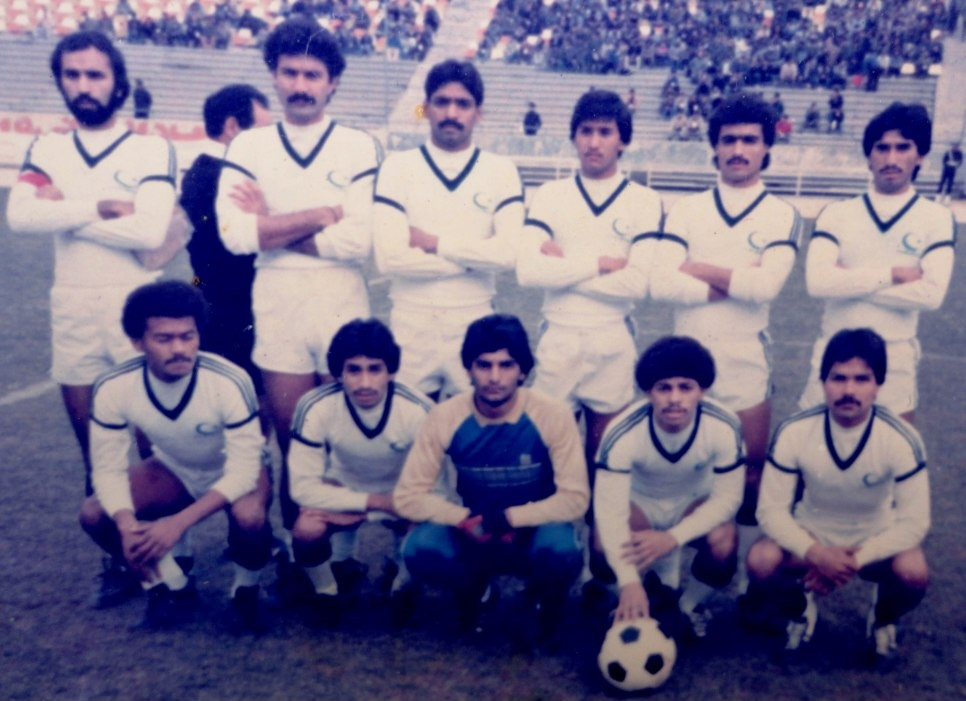
Pakistan at the 1986 Fajr International Tournament

After participating at the 1986 Fajr International Tournament in Iran, the team finished runners-up at the 1986 Quaid-e-Azam International Tournament involving China, Sri Lanka, Nepal and a South Korean XI. In the 1986 Asian Games, Pakistan lost all their games.

Pakistan's starting line-up at the 1989 South Asian Games final against Bangladesh (Exact formation type and players position unknown)
Coach: Wang Xiao He

In 1987 after an unsuccessful campaign at the 1988 Summer Olympics Qualification against Nepal at away venue, the side was more successful at the 1987 South Asian Games, winning the bronze medal match against Bangladesh 1–0. In 1988, after losing the 1988 AFC Asian Cup qualification, Pakistan began with their first ever participation for the 1990 FIFA World Cup qualifiers for Italy in January and February, losing all matches. The national team bounced back, when several months later they took gold at the 1989 South Asian Games, beating Bangladesh 1–0 in the final, from a solitary goal by Haji Abdul Sattar in the dying minutes of the game.

=== Sustained regional competitiveness (1990s) ===

Pakistan's starting line-up in 5–3–2 sweeper formation at the 1991 South Asian Games final against Maldives
Coach: Muhammad Aslam Japani

Pakistan had another early exit in the 1990 Asian Games, losing all three games. In the 1991 South Asian Games however, Pakistan beat the Maldives in the final 2–0 to win their second gold, from goals scored by Qazi Ashfaq and Muhammad Nauman Khan. In 1992, the team lost all matches at the 1992 AFC Asian Cup qualification and the 1992 Jordan International Tournament. After again ending unsuccessful at the 1994 FIFA World Cup qualification in 1993, the team hosted the inaugural 1993 SAARC Gold Cup in Lahore, finishing fourth. At the 1993 South Asian Games, they were unable to get past the group stage.

Pakistan went out of the 1995 SAARC Gold Cup group stage on goal difference. The team lost all their Asian Cup and World Cup qualifying games. Pakistan came third in the 1997 SAFF Cup, thanks to a 1–0 victory over Sri Lanka in the third place playoff. The 1999 SAFF Cup saw Pakistan finish bottom of their group, and Pakistan also failed to get out of the group stage of the final 1999 South Asian Games to hold full internationals.

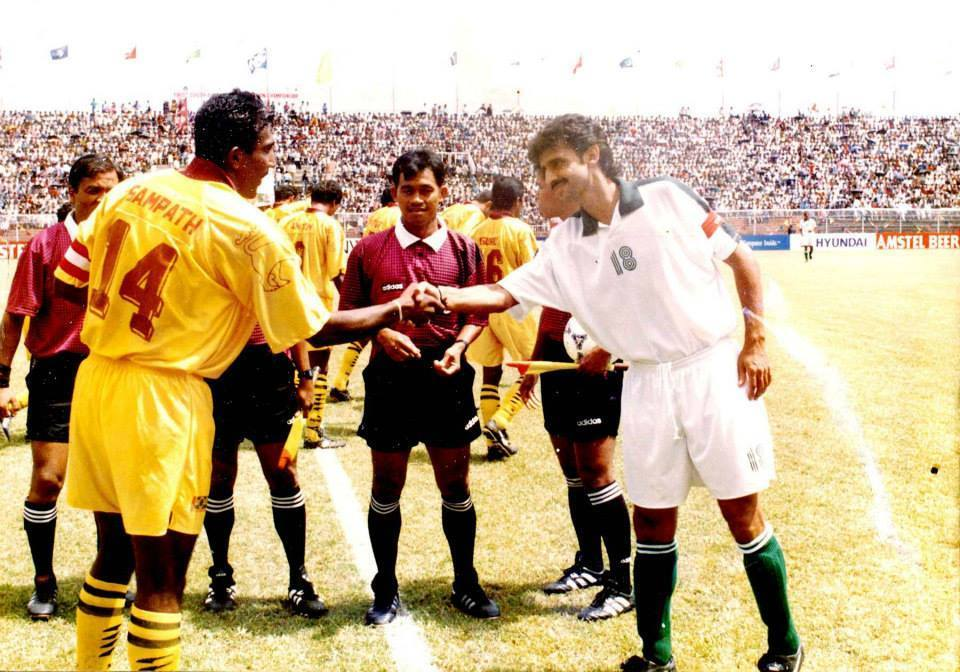
Pakistan and Sri Lanka during the Third-place match at the 1997 SAFF Gold Cup

Pakistan were unable to win any of their 2000 Asian Cup qualifiers. The following year Pakistan achieved their first point in the 2002 World Cup qualification, thanks to a hat-trick by Gohar Zaman in a 3–3 draw against Sri Lanka, but all other matches ended in defeat.

In 2002, Pakistan played in an unsuccessful four match series against Sri Lanka. At the 2003 SAFF Cup, under the inspiration of the attacking midfielder Sarfraz Rasool, Pakistan stunned India, Sri Lanka and Afghanistan in three victories as they reached the semi-finals only to fall short against Maldives by 1–0. Pakistan finished fourth, losing 2–1 in extra time to India in the third place playoff. Later in the year, Pakistan won their first Asian Cup qualifier with a 3–0 over Macao, but still were unable to qualify. They rounded off the year with defeats to Kyrgyzstan in the World Cup qualifiers.

=== Mixed results and structural reforms (2004–2014) ===
2004 saw changes in Pakistan football, with a new administration in place by this time and a new national league up and running. A victory and a draw against India in a three match series, the final match ending 3–0 in favour to the Green Shirts, followed by the reach in the semi-finals of the 2005 SAFF Cup, losing against defending champion Bangladesh by 0–1 margin.

The Pakistan team lost their first two Asian Cup qualifiers in 2006, in between which they took part in the first 2006 AFC Challenge Cup. They failed to get past the group stage, but beat Kyrgyzstan 1–0. Back at the Asian Cup qualifiers, they lost their remaining fixtures. In the 2010 World Cup qualifiers in 2007, they fell to a heavy defeat by the Asian champions Iraq, losing 7–0 on aggregate across the two legs after drawing 0–0 in the second round. In 2008, Pakistan travelled to Nepal for two friendlies before taking on the 2008 AFC Challenge Cup qualification. Although they won against Chinese Taipei 2–1 in the first match, and beat Guam in a record-equalling 9–2 win in the final match, other results, including a 7–1 defeat to Sri Lanka, saw them again fail to reach the finals.

In the 2008 SAFF Championship, Pakistan failed to go beyond the group stages, losing to Maldives 3–0, India 2–1 and Nepal 4–1, which signalled the end of Akhtar Mohiuddin's tenure as head coach. After Mohiuddin's departure, George Kottan was hired and the veteran tactician took the team to the 2009 SAFF Championship. The side were defeated 1–0 by Sri Lanka, before drawing 0–0 with Bangladesh as Adnan Ahmed missed a late penalty to seal a win. Pakistan won against Bhutan 7–0 in their last game.

Kottan was soon sacked in February 2010, Pakistan had no senior games during the entire calendar year. For the 2012 AFC Challenge Cup qualification in 2011, coach Tariq Lutfi was called up once more and failed to deliver. Defeats such as the 3–0 against Turkmenistan and 3–1 against India meant that the side were already out of the qualifiers despite beating Chinese Taipei by 2–0. Later in the 2014 FIFA World Cup Qualifiers in July, Pakistan lost 3–0 to Bangladesh in Dhaka, before earning a 0–0 draw in Lahore a few days later. Pakistan did not qualify for the 2014 FIFA World Cup, being eliminated by Bangladesh in the first round of the AFC qualifying section in 2011, losing 3–0 on aggregate.

That saw the end of Lutfi's reign, with Serbian coach Zaviša Milosavljević taking over in November 2011 right before the 2011 SAFF Championship. Despite having little time to influence the team, Zavisa managed to hold Bangladesh 0–0, Maldives 0–0 and Nepal 1–1 in the India-hosted 2011 SAFF Championship. However, they were unable to progress into the semi-finals and returned home.

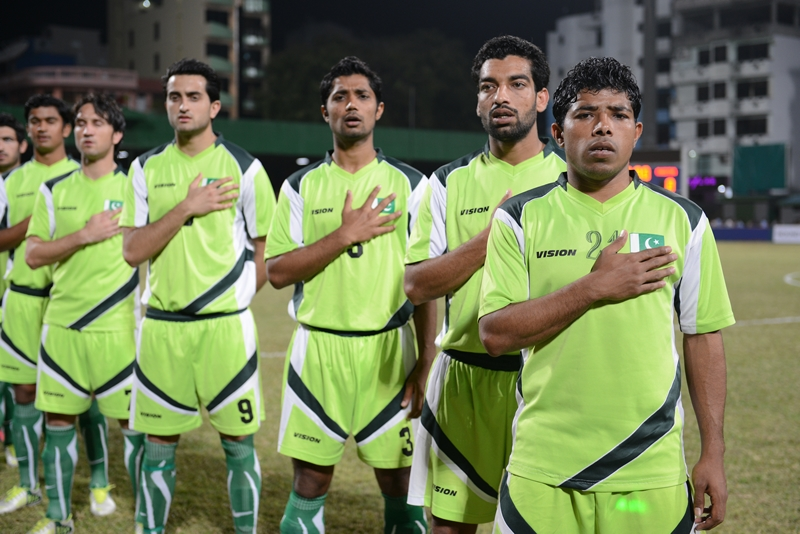
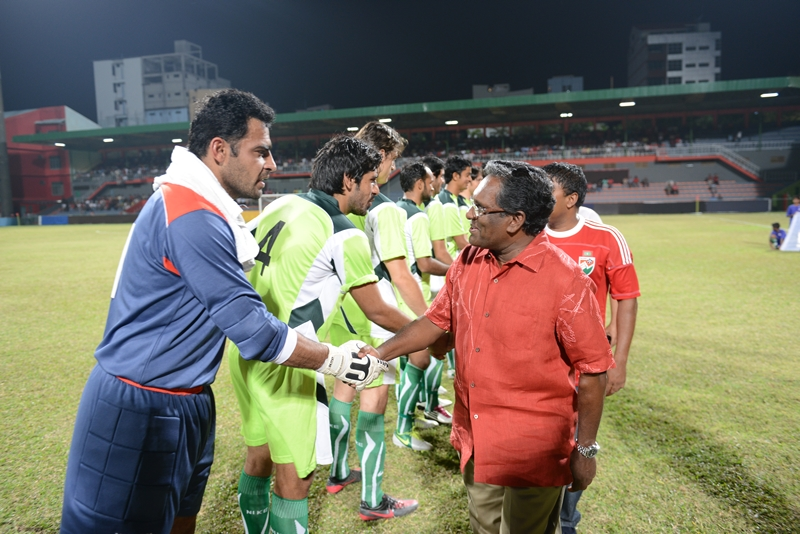
Pakistan in Malé during a friendly against Maldives in 2013

2012's sole game was witnessed in November against Singapore, who thrashed Pakistan 4–0 at home. Pakistan started 2013 well, winning two games against Nepal with identical 1–0 margins. A 1–1 draw with Maldives followed, but with congested fixtures Pakistan ended up losing the last game 3–0 in Male.

Pakistan then played the 2014 AFC Challenge Cup qualification in Bishkek, losing out 1–0 to Tajikistan in injury-time. Pakistan also lost 1–0 against the Kyrgyzstan after scoring in the 1st minute, but comfortably beat Macau 2–0.

Pakistan played a friendly against Afghanistan in August, losing 3–0 without their foreign-based players. Coach Zaviša Milosavljević was controversially sacked and replaced by Bahrain's Mohammad Al-Shamlan, who acted as a coaching consultant to Shahzad Anwar in the 2013 SAFF Championship. The Shaheens lost their first game 1–0 to India after an own-goal from Samar Ishaq. Against hosts Nepal, Hassan Bashir scored an early goal, only to see 15-year-old Bimal Gharti Magar level things in injury-time. However, Pakistan beat Bangladesh 2–1 but failed to advance to the semi-finals. The team participated at the 2013 Philippine Peace Cup at the end of the year.

For Pakistan's campaign for the 2018 FIFA World Cup, they were to face Yemen in Round 1 in the AFC qualifying section. In the first match, Pakistan lost 3–1. For the second match, Pakistan drew 0–0, eliminating Pakistan from the tournament on aggregate.

=== Inactivity and FIFA suspensions (2015–2022) ===
Pakistan was suspended from all football activities by FIFA on 10 October 2017, after the controversial tenure of the PFF president and politician Faisal Saleh Hayat, widely described as a "feudal lord of Pakistani football".

For three years since March 2015, the top division of the Pakistan Premier League remained suspended because of the crisis created due to his actions, along with the men's senior team, who remained suspended from any international competition, and FIFA rankings of the senior team had slumped from 168 in 2003 to the lowest 201 in 2017.

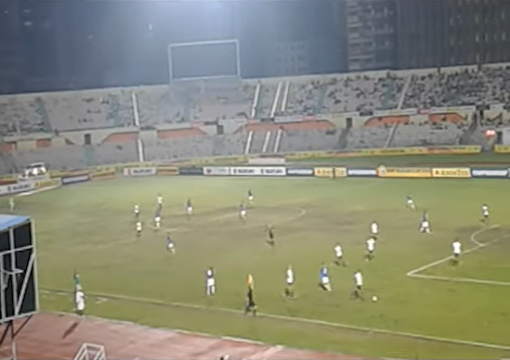
Pakistan against India at the 2018 SAFF Championship

FIFA restored membership of PFF on 13 March 2018.

Pakistan went to Bangladesh to take part in 2018 SAFF Cup which started in September 2018 which was their first FIFA recognised tournament after a span of 3 years. Pakistan played its first match of the event against Nepal which ended in a 2–1 win. Pakistan lost its next match to hosts Bangladesh by 1–0 after conceding a late goal. Green shirts played their final group game against Bhutan which ended in a 3–0 win and sealed their place in semis after 13 years. Pakistan faced arch rivals India in semi-final and were ultimately knocked out by 3–1.

After the SAFF Cup, Pakistan negotiated with the Palestine Football Association for a friendly. It was initially reported that the match will be played in Lahore, Pakistan on 15 November 2018 but Palestine decided to host the event afterwards. Due to visa issues, Pakistan team couldn't fly to Palestine on the desired date. So, the match was played on 16 November in which Shaheens lost by 2–1.

Disappointment would soon strike again as Pakistan lost its chance to pass the 2022 FIFA qualification, losing against Cambodia twice in the first round and was eliminated. The preliminary camp for the matches were controversially organised by two different federations. Faisal Saleh Hayat-led Pakistan Football Federation, which was internationally recognised, and non-FIFA recognised Ashfaq Hussain Shah group, which formed a parallel PFF, coming into power by third-party interference through the PFF elections conducted by the Supreme Court.

Pakistan were once again suspended from all football activities by FIFA on 7 April 2021. The suspension was lifted on 29 June 2022.

=== International return and historic World Cup qualification win (2022–present) ===
Pakistan made their comeback by playing a friendly match against Nepal in November 2022, losing 0–1 in a late minute goal. They played a second friendly match against Maldives in March 2023 losing 0–1.

Pakistan subsequently took part in the 2023 Mauritius Four Nations Cup featuring Mauritius, Kenya, Djibouti and the 2023 SAFF Championship alongside India, Kuwait and Nepal in the group stages, losing all six matches and finishing last in their group in each competition.

On 27 July 2023, the draw for the first round of the 2026 FIFA World Cup qualification took place in which Pakistan were drawn once again against Cambodia, followed by the appointment of the English coach Stephen Constantine. In the first leg in Phnom Penh, Pakistan contested in a goalless 0–0 draw. Pakistan won their second leg beating Cambodia 1–0 in Islamabad, due to a goal by Harun Hamid, recording their first-ever victory in World Cup qualifiers in their first fixture at home for eight years, and qualifying for the second round for the first time.

Following the victory in Islamabad, the Shaheens were drawn in a group with Saudi Arabia, Jordan, and Tajikistan. Being the 193rd ranked team, Pakistan were the lowest-ranked team in the qualifiers, and terminated the campaign losing all the games in the group.

Pakistan was briefly suspended from all football activities again by FIFA on 6 February 2025 due to failing to adopt a version of the PFF constitution approved by FIFA and the AFC that would have guaranteed fair elections. The suspension was lifted on 2 March 2025 after the PFF agreed to adopt the FIFA and AFC approved constitution. After an unsuccessful campaign at the 2027 AFC Asian Cup qualification, the team participated in the Diamond Jubilee International Football Tournament held in Maldives in 2026. After a draw against Bangladesh Olympic, and victories over Maldives and rivals Afghanistan, the team again defeated Afghanistan in the final, marking their first football title in 35 years since the 1991 South Asian Games.

Pakistan took part in the 2026 FIFA ASEAN Cup as a guest team in the primarily Southeast Asian tournament, notably drawing 2–2 draw against the Philippines.

== Team image ==
=== Kit ===
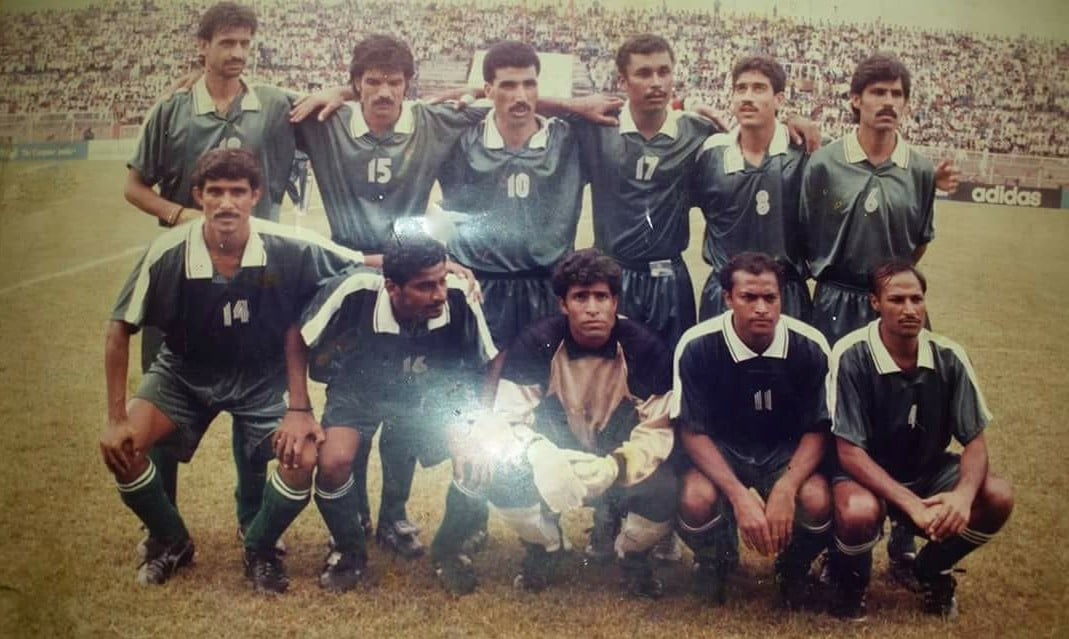
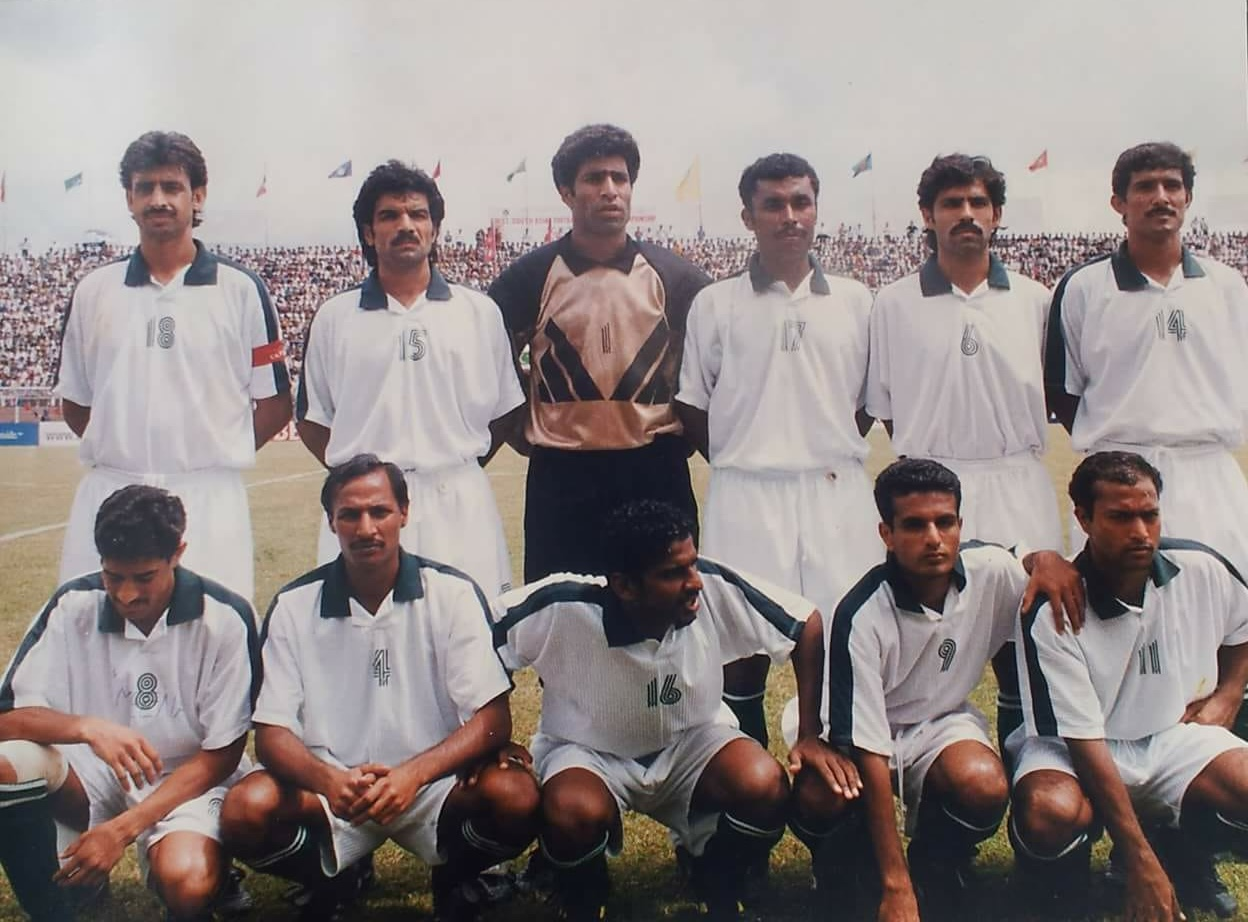
Pakistan wearing the traditional green home jersey (above), and the traditional white away jersey (below) at the 1997 SAFF Gold Cup

The Pakistan national team's kits have traditionally featured green and white, either as individual colours or in combination. The colours are derived from the flag of Pakistan which is a green field with a white crescent moon and five-rayed star at its centre, and a vertical white stripe at the hoist side.

==== Kit suppliers ====
Kit supplier	Period	Ref.
Unknown	1950–2000	
(United Kingdom) Sapphire Sports	2001	
(Pakistan) National Bank	2005	
(Pakistan) Roshi Sports	2007	
(Pakistan) Vision	2010–2013	
(Pakistan) Forward	2013–2015	
None (Note: From 2015 to 2017, Pakistan didn't play any matches due to Pakistan Football Federation (PFF) crisis and consequent ban by FIFA.)	2015–2017	
(United Kingdom) Joshila	2018–2021	
None (Note: From 2021 to 2022, Pakistan didn't play any matches due to Pakistan Football Federation (PFF) ban by FIFA.)	2021–2022	
(Pakistan) Denim Studio	2022–2023	
(Pakistan) Gym Armour	2023–2026	
(Pakistan) Aora	2026–present	

=== Home stadiums ===
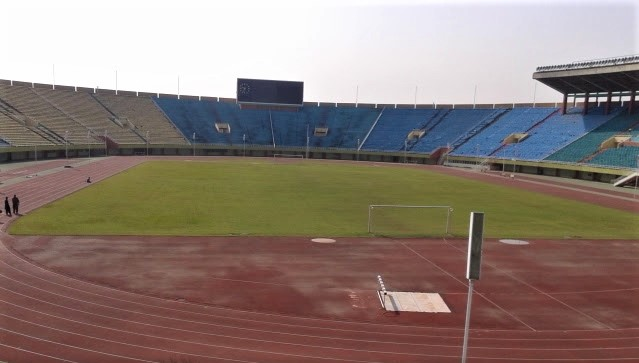
Jinnah Sports Stadium in Islamabad

For the first fifty years of their existence, Pakistan played their home matches at various multi-purpose stadiums all around the country. YMCA Ground in Karachi hosted the national team's first home match against Iran on 23 April 1952. The Hockey Club stadium hosted the 1974 RCD Cup and the inaugural 1976 Quaid-e-Azam International Tournament. The consequent 1982 Quaid-e-Azam International Tournament was held at the cricket National Stadium, while the 1985 edition was held at the Qayyum Stadium in Peshawar.

Although the Pakistan Football Federation doesn't own any stadium to date, since the 1980s Pakistan plays majority of their home matches at the Jinnah Sports Stadium in the capital Islamabad which first hosted the 1986 Quaid-e-Azam International Tournament, and where the senior team won the 1989 South Asian Games. By the 1990s, the Railway Stadium in Lahore also served as one of the primary venues which also hosted the inaugural 1993 SAARC Gold Cup.

By the 2000s, several alternative stadiums emerged such as Karachi's People's Football Stadium and the Punjab Stadium in Lahore located near the headquarters of the Pakistan Football Federation.

The Jinnah Sports Stadium is the largest football stadium in Pakistan with a capacity of over 45,000, whereas the People's Football Stadium is second largest with 40,000.

=== Pakistan B ===
In the Quaid-e-Azam International Tournament, two Pakistan national teams usually participated, the Pakistan national football team under the name of Pakistan Greens, and the Pakistan national B team under the name of Pakistan Reds in 1976, Pakistan Blue in 1982, and Pakistan White in 1985, 1986 and 1987. Alongside the senior national team, the other national team mainly consisted of "second string" or youth international players. Having a two separate teams was very common during the 80s and 90s for developing South Asian countries, both Nepal (Nepal B) and Bangladesh (Bangladesh B) had second string team's.

In June 1993, the Pakistan Football Federation sent an alternate team, designated as "Pakistan A", to the 1993 ECO Cup held in Tehran, Iran, while the main national team was participating in the 1994 FIFA World Cup qualifiers. At the inaugural 1993 SAARC Gold Cup held in Lahore, a second string team named Pakistan White also played exhibition matches against the national sides participating in the tournament.

=== Rivalries ===
==== India ====
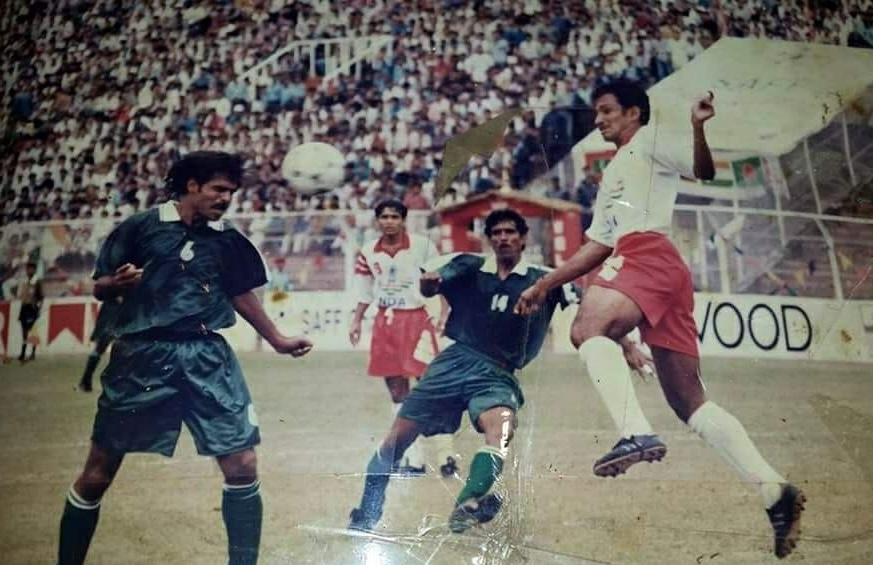
Pakistan against India at the 1997 SAFF Gold Cup

Pakistan's arch-rivals in several sports including football are India. The two teams first met at the 1952 Asian Quadrangular Football Tournament, which ended in a goalless draw and both teams crowned champions of the tournament. India first won at the consequent 1953 Asian Quadrangular Football Tournament with a 1–0 win, with Neville D'Souza scoring a goal. Pakistan men's football team recorded its first official win over India at the 1960 AFC Asian Cup qualification with Abdullah Rahi netting the winner. Currently, Pakistan has won three games, there have been eight draws and sixteen wins for India among the 27 games played so far. In addition, both teams have faced each other two times in exhibition matches after the finalisation of the 1953 and 1955 Asian Quadrangular Football Tournament editions, with Pakistan winning both times by 1–0.

==== Afghanistan ====
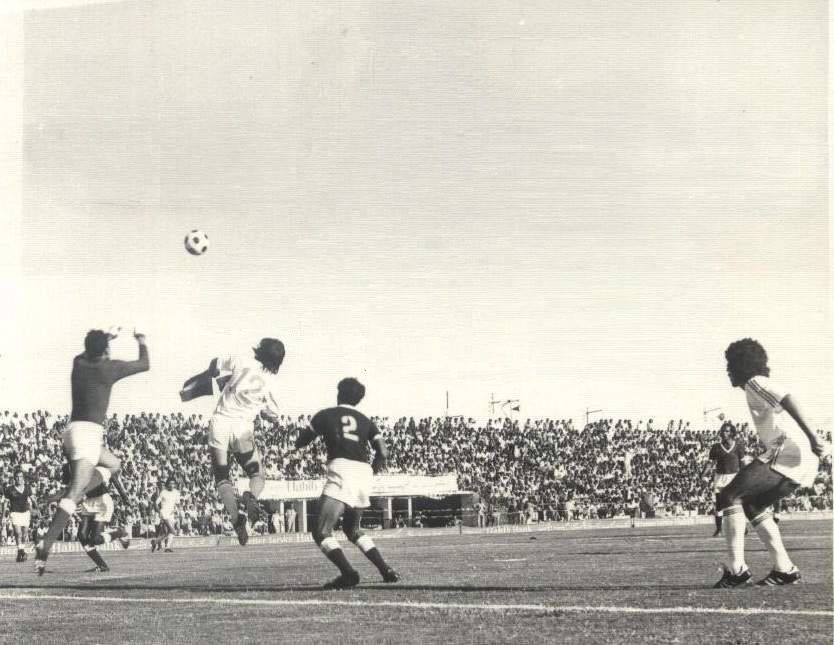
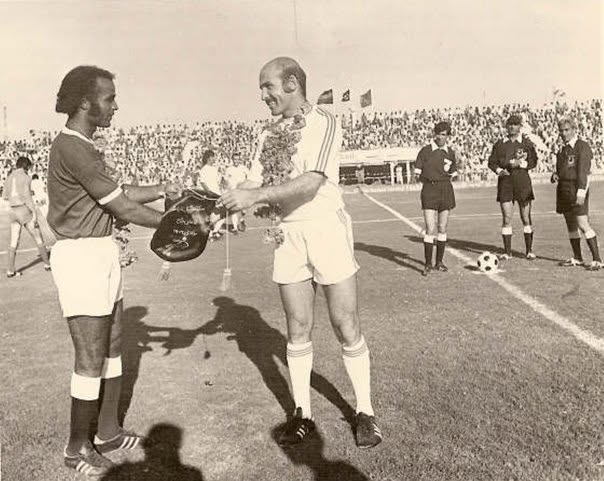
Pakistan vs Afghanistan at the 1976 Quaid-e-Azam International Tournament

Pakistan is currently rivals with Afghanistan in many sports, including cricket and football.

The national teams of Pakistan and Afghanistan first met at the 1976 Afghanistan Republic Day Festival Cup, where the A team of Afghanistan won by 1–0, with Mohammad Saber Rohparwar scoring the lone goal on a corner kick minutes before game's end. Because of rising tensions between the two countries in the 1970s, Afghan president Mohammad Daoud Khan handed each player 5,000 afghanis as a celebration and gift for their victory. Both teams met again at the 1976 Quaid-e-Azam International Tournament the same year where Pakistan avenged by winning by the same score, with forward Afzal Qasim scoring the winning goal in the eighth minute after the kick off. A Pakistani selection named Shaheen FC again participated in the Afghan tournament in 1977.

The ensuing civil war and political instability in Afghanistan prevented the two sides from meeting again until 2003. Due to the historical, cultural and political relationship between the two countries, contests between the teams generate much enthusiasm amongst football fans on account of their mutual relations and have been referred to as a "rivalry".

== Results and fixtures ==
The following is a list of match results in the last 12 months, as well as any future match have been scheduled.

Win Draw Loss Fixture

=== 2026 ===
31 March 2027 Asian Cup qualification third round	Pakistan	1–2	Myanmar	Islamabad, Pakistan
14:00 UTC+5	S. Dost 90'	Report; Report (AFC)	Saqib Hanif 46' (o.g.); Than Paing 59'	Stadium: Jinnah Sports Stadium; Attendance: 0 Referee: Firdavs Nosafarov (Uzbekistan)
Note: The match was held behind closed doors due to restrictions on large public gatherings by Pakistani government.

1 June 2026 Diamond Jubilee Tournament	Pakistan	0–0	Bangladesh Olympic	Malé, Maldives
16:00 UTC+5:30		Report		Stadium: National Football Stadium; Attendance: 1,200; Referee: Javiz Mohamed (Maldives)

4 June 2026 Diamond Jubilee Tournament	Maldives	0–3	Pakistan	Malé, Maldives
16:00 UTC+5:30		Report	Nawaz 53'; Arshad 84'; Hamid 87'	Stadium: National Football Stadium; Attendance: 1050; Referee: Ashwin Kumar (India)

7 June 2026 Diamond Jubilee Tournament	Afghanistan	0–2	Pakistan	Malé, Maldives
16:00 UTC+5:30		Report	Nawaz 5'; Hamid 90+2'	Stadium: National Football Stadium; Attendance: 450; Referee: Sinan Hussain (Maldives)

10 June 2026 Diamond Jubilee International Football Tournament final	Pakistan	2–0	Afghanistan	Malé, Maldives
21:00 UTC+5:30	Shayak 24'; Hamid 90+4'	Report		Stadium: National Football Stadium; Attendance: 273; Referee: Aditya Purkayastha (India)

26 September 2026 ASEAN Cup Group B	Pakistan	0–4	Thailand	Bandung, Indonesia
14:30 UTC+5:30		Report	Teerasak 31', 84'; Soonsup-Bell 41'; Zeb 64' (o.g.)	Stadium: Si Jalak Harupat Stadium; Referee: Kim Hee-gon (South Korea)

29 September 2026 ASEAN Cup Group B	Philippines	2–2	Pakistan	Bandung, Indonesia
15:00 UTC+7	Reyes 24'; Kristensen 32' (pen.)	Report	Khan 47'; Arshad 62'	Stadium: Si Jalak Harupat Stadium; Referee: Abdurashid Khudoyberganov (Uzbekistan)

2 October 2026 ASEAN Cup Group B	Vietnam	4–2	Pakistan	Jakarta, Indonesia
16:00 UTC+7	Nguyễn Hai Long 50'; Nguyễn Hoàng Đức 57'; Nguyễn Đình Bắc 80'; Williams Minh Hoàng 90+1'	Report	Mohib 31'; Kaleemullah 88'	Stadium: Gelora Bung Karno Stadium; Referee: Muhammad Taqi (Singapore)

5 November 2026 SAFF Championship Group B	India	3–2	Pakistan	Dhaka, Bangladesh
15:30 +6:00	Suhail 13', 19'; Kipgen 32'	SAFF; FIFA	Najeeb 90+1'; Ghazi 90+4'	Stadium: National Stadium; Attendance: 2,300; Referee: Ngô Duy Lân (Vietnam)

8 November 2026 SAFF Championship Group B	Pakistan	3–0	Maldives	Dhaka, Bangladesh
15:30 +6:00	M. Abdullah 3' (pen.); Najeeb 8', 23'	SAFF; FIFA		Stadium: National Stadium; Attendance: 203; Referee: Ahmad A'Qashah (Singapore)

14 November 2026 SAFF Championship Semi-finals	Bangladesh	0–1	Pakistan	Dhaka, Bangladesh
20:30 +6:00		Report	Arshad 86'	Stadium: National Stadium; Attendance: 21,983; Referee: Ngô Duy Lân (Vietnam)

17 November 2026 SAFF Championship Final	India	2–1	Pakistan	Dhaka, Bangladesh
20:30 +6:00	Bhat 61'; Mandi 88'	Report	Ghazi 45+1'	Stadium: National Stadium; Attendance: 9,348; Referee: Mohammed Khalfan Al Manai (Oman)

== Coaching staff ==
=== Personnel ===
Position	Name
Head coach	(Peru) Nolberto Solano
Assistant coaches	(England) Titus Bramble
Assistant coaches	(Pakistan) Walid Javaid
Goalkeeper coach	(Pakistan) Zahid Taj
Fitness coach	(Portugal) Eduardo Seixas
Physiotherapist	(Pakistan) Muhammad Adnan
Team manager	(Pakistan) Shahzaib Ahmed Khan
Technical observer	(Pakistan) Asghar Khan Anjum

== Players ==
=== Current squad ===
The following players were named in the squad for the 2026 SAFF Championship in September 2026.

Caps and goals are correct as of 14 November 2026, after the match against Bangladesh.

No.	Pos.	Player	Date of birth (age)	Caps	Goals	Club
	GK	Yousuf Butt	18 October 1989 (age 37)	39	0	(Danish Football Association) Ishøj IF
	GK	Saqib Hanif	23 April 1994 (age 32)	11	0	(Football Association of Maldives) New Radiant
	GK	Hassan Ali	23 February 2003 (age 23)	0	0	(Pakistan Football Federation) WAPDA
	DF	Mohib Ullah	23 May 2005 (age 21)	15	1	(Bhutan Football Federation) Paro FC
	DF	Abdullah Iqbal (Captain)	27 July 2002 (age 24)	25	0	(Swedish Football Association) Mjällby
	DF	Easah Suliman	26 January 1998 (age 28)	14	0	(Association of Football Federations of Azerbaijan) Sumgayit
	DF	Mamoon Moosa Khan	28 November 2000 (age 25)	13	0	(Bhutan Football Federation) Paro FC
	DF	Abdul Rehman	25 February 2008 (age 18)	5	0	(Pakistan Football Federation) POPO FC
	DF	Haris Zeb	15 May 2001 (age 25)	12	0	(New Zealand Football) South Island United
	DF	Ali Khan Niazi	14 December 2000 (age 25)	6	0	(Pakistan Football Federation) SA Gardens
	DF	Waqar Baloch	2 March 1996 (age 30)	7	0	(Pakistan Football Federation) Khan Research Laboratories
	DF	Junaid Shah	23 March 2003 (age 23)	11	0	(Pakistan Football Federation) SA Gardens
	DF	Haseeb Khan	4 April 2000 (age 26)	8	0	(Pakistan Football Federation) Pakistan Air Force
	MF	Hayyaan Khattak	6 October 2003 (age 23)	10	0	(Pakistan Football Federation) POPO FC
	MF	Alamgir Ghazi	9 May 2001 (age 25)	27	1	(Pakistan Football Federation) WAPDA
	MF	Ali Uzair	14 October 1996 (age 30)	27	0	(Bangladesh Football Federation) Brothers Union
	MF	Tufail Shinwari	10 May 2006 (age 20)	4	0	(Pakistan Football Federation) Karachi United
	MF	Adil Nabi	28 February 1994 (age 32)	4	0	(Hellenic Football Federation) Panachaiki
	MF	Muhammad Junaid		2	0	(Pakistan Football Federation) WAPDA
	MF	Zain ul Abideen Ishaque	25 May 1998 (age 28)	2	0	(Pakistan Football Federation) Karachi United
	FW	Kaleemullah Khan	20 September 1992 (age 34)	29	5	(Pakistan Football Federation) Abdul FC
	FW	Abdul Arshad	26 February 2003 (age 23)	18	3	(Danish Football Association) Kolding IF
	FW	Shayak Dost	1 May 2002 (age 24)	25	2	(Bangladesh Football Federation) City Club
	FW	Ali Khan	16 March 2001 (age 25)	4	1	(Swedish Football Association) Vasalunds IF
	FW	Umar Nawaz	28 September 2007 (age 19)	8	2	(Football Association of Finland) Kajaanin Haka
	FW	Syed Ali Raza	6 August 2004 (age 22)	5	0	(Bangladesh Football Federation) Brothers Union
	FW	Najeeb Ullah Khan	2 August 2007 (age 19)	3	3	(Pakistan Football Federation) Khan Research Laboratories
	FW	McKeal Abdullah	7 July 2005 (age 21)	9	1	(The Football Association) Ilkeston Town

=== Recent call-ups ===
The following players have also been called up to the Pakistan squad within the last twelve months.

Pos.	Player	Date of birth (age)	Caps	Goals	Club	Latest call-up
GK	Zulqurnain Shinwari		0	0	(Pakistan) POPO FC	2026 SAFF Championship^{PRE}
GK	Usman Ali	10 June 2004 (age 22)	0	0	(Bangladesh) PWD SC	v. Syria; 31 March 2026
DF	Arslan Ali	28 December 1998 (age 27)	1	0	(Pakistan) Khan Research Laboratories	2026 SAFF Championship^{PRE}
DF	Abdul Qadeer Khan		2	0	(Pakistan) Khan Research Laboratories	2026 SAFF Championship^{PRE}
DF	Muhammad Adeel	1 April 2006 (age 20)	0	0	(Pakistan) WAPDA	2026 SAFF Championship^{PRE}
DF	Abdullah Shah	6 February 2001 (age 25)	11	0	(Pakistan) Mehran FC	2026 FIFA ASEAN Cup
DF	Mohammad Fazal	29 May 2002 (age 24)	11	0	(Sweden) Nordic United	2026 FIFA ASEAN Cup
DF	Ubaid Ullah Khan		0	0	(Pakistan) WAPDA	2026 FIFA ASEAN Cup^{PRE}
DF	Shahid Anjum		0	0	(Pakistan)	2026 FIFA ASEAN Cup^{PRE}
DF	Muhammad Umar Hayat	22 September 1996 (age 30)	22	1	(Pakistan) WAPDA	2026 Diamond Jubilee International Football Tournament^{PRE}
DF	Ahmed Salman	24 August 2006 (age 20)	1	0	(United Arab Emirates) Shabab Al Ahli	v. Syria; 31 March 2026
DF	Sardar Wali	28 November 1998 (age 27)	0	0	(Pakistan) WAPDA	v. Syria; 31 March 2026
DF	Kamil Marwat	10 January 2006 (age 20)	0	0	(Pakistan) POPO FC	v. Syria; 31 March 2026
DF	Ans Amin	15 April 2006 (age 20)	0	0	(Pakistan) SA Gardens	v. Syria; 31 March 2026
DF	Rehman Manzoor	3 August 2003 (age 23)	1	0	Pakistan Army	v. Syria; 31 March 2026
MF	Umair Ali	17 May 1999 (age 27)	3	0	Pakistan Army	2026 SAFF Championship^{PRE}
MF	Ali Agha	15 May 1997 (age 29)	7	0	(Pakistan) Khan Research Laboratories	2026 FIFA ASEAN Cup
MF	Ali Zafar	28 August 2007 (age 19)	0	0	(Pakistan) Khan Research Laboratories	2026 FIFA ASEAN Cup^{PRE}
MF	Owais Ilyas		0	0	(Pakistan)	2026 FIFA ASEAN Cup^{PRE}
MF	Otis Khan	5 September 1995 (age 31)	15	0	(England) Altrincham	2026 Diamond Jubilee International Football Tournament
MF	Rahis Nabi	16 April 1999 (age 27)	19	1	(England) Sporting Khalsa	2026 Diamond Jubilee International Football Tournament
MF	Muhammad Fahad	27 December 1999 (age 26)	0	0	(Pakistan) SA Gardens	v. Syria; 31 March 2026
FW	Ibraheem Siddiqui	28 March 2009 (age 17)	0	0	(Switzerland) FC Aesch Youth	2026 SAFF Championship^{PRE}
FW	Abdul Samad Khan		2	0	(Azerbaijan) Qarabağ FK Youth	2026 FIFA ASEAN Cup
FW	Samad Khan Wazir	15 March 1998 (age 28)	0	0	Pakistan Air Force	2026 FIFA ASEAN Cup^{PRE}
FW	Harun Hamid	10 November 2003 (age 23)	18	4	(Bosnia and Herzegovina) Jedinstvo Bihać	2026 Diamond Jubilee International Football Tournament
FW	Ali Haider Shah	2 March 2003 (age 23)	2	0	(Denmark) Ishøj IF	2026 Diamond Jubilee International Football Tournament
FW	Moin Ahmed	28 November 2003 (age 22)	6	0	(Bangladesh) Dhaka Abahani	v. Syria; 31 March 2026
FW	Muhammad Afzaal	4 September 1997 (age 29)	1	0	Pakistan Army	v. Syria; 31 March 2026
FW	Jevan Khan	13 December 2006 (age 19)	1	0	(Pakistan) SA Gardens	v. Syria; 31 March 2026
^{PRE} Preliminary squad / standby; ^{RET} Retired from the national team; ^{INJ} Player withdrew due to injury; ^{WD} Player withdrew from squad due to non-injury issue

== Player records ==
As of 2 October 2026
Players in bold are still active with Pakistan.

=== Most appearances ===
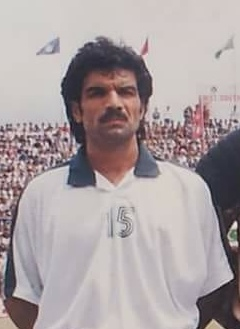
Haroon Yousaf is Pakistan's most capped player with 49 appearances.

Rank	Player	Caps	Goals	Period
1	Haroon Yousaf	49	3	1992–2003
2	Jaffar Khan	47	0	2001–2013
3	Zafar Iqbal	45	1	1985–1995
4	Samar Ishaq	44	3	2006–2013
5	Muhammad Essa	40	11	2001–2009
5	Muhammad Tariq Hussain	40	0	1987–2003
7	**Yousuf Butt**	36	0	2012–present
8	Muhammad Umer	35	18	1956–1965
8	Abdul Ghafoor	35	3	1959–1974
8	Abdullah Rahi	35	3	1959–1967

NB Exact figures of old long-serving players such as Muhammad Umer, Abdul Ghafoor, Abdullah Rahi & Abid Hussain Ghazi, who are likely to have accumulated between 30 and 40 caps, are not yet known and yet to be researched. Additionally, player appearances are also missing in the 2000 AFC Asian Cup qualification, two of the 2002 friendly matches against Sri Lanka, 2005 Islamic Solidarity Games match against Malaysia, and 2006 friendly against Palestine in the primary source and yet to be updated.

=== Top goalscorers ===
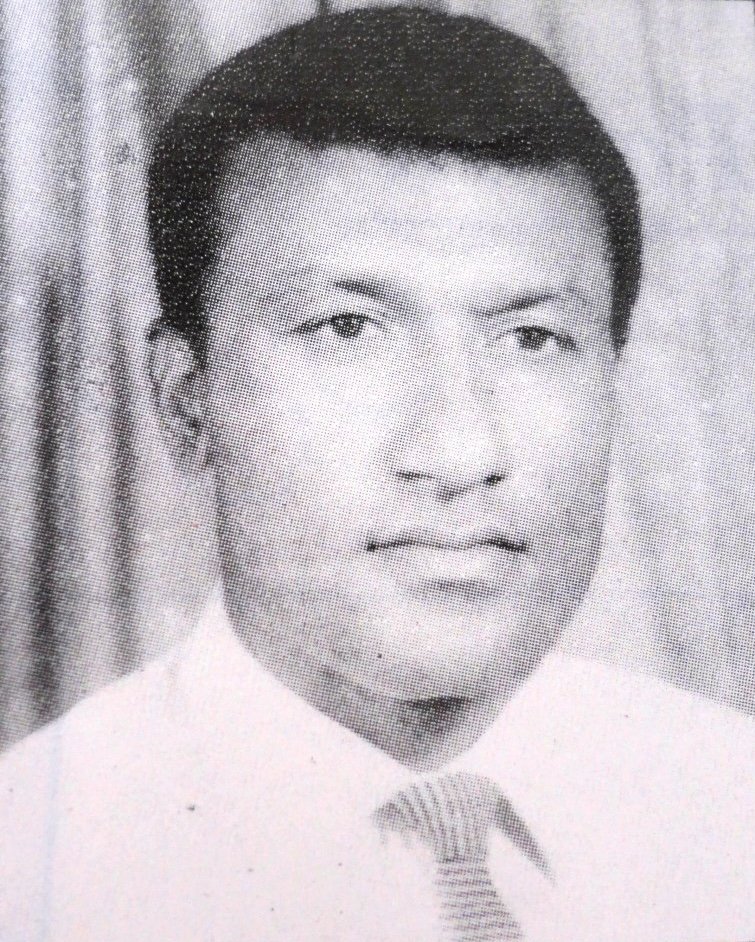
Muhammad Umer is Pakistan's all-time top scorer with 18 goals.

Rank	Player	Goals	Caps	Ratio	Period
1	Muhammad Umer	18	35	0.51	1956–1965
2	Sharafat Ali	12	32	0.38	1984–1992
3	Moosa Ghazi	11	25	0.44	1955–1967
3	Muhammad Essa	11	40	0.28	2001–2009
5	Masood Fakhri	10	13	0.77	1952–1955
6	Qayyum Changezi	9	—	—	1955–1963
6	Hassan Bashir	9	29	0.31	2012–2023
8	Jamil Akhtar	8	14	0.57	1952–1955
9	Arif Mehmood	7	21	0.33	2005–2012
10	Ghulam Sarwar Teddy	6	—	—	1984–1992
10	Muhammad Nauman Khan	6	18	0.33	1991–1997
10	Sarfraz Rasool	6	23	0.26	1997–2003

NB Goalscorer information is currently missing and yet to be researched for the 1–1 draw against India at the 1976 Afghanistan Republic Day Festival Cup, the 4–7 friendly defeat against China in 1973, and the 1–1 draw against South Vietnam at the 1958 Asian Games.

=== Captains ===
- In major Continental and International tournaments. For the complete list, see the main article.

Player	Tournament
Moideen Kutty	1954 Asian Games
Nabi Chowdhury	1958 Asian Games
Abdul Ghafoor	1974 Asian Games
Muhammad Naveed	1986 Asian Games
Mateen Akhtar	1990 Asian Games
Jaffar Khan	2006 AFC Challenge Cup

== Competitive record ==
=== FIFA World Cup ===
FIFA World Cup record									Qualification record					
Year	Result	Position	Pld	W	D*	L	GF	GA	Pld	W	D*	L	GF	GA
1930 to 1938	Part of United Kingdom								Part of United Kingdom					
1950 to 1986	Did not enter								Did not enter					
(Italy) 1990	Did not qualify								4	0	0	4	1	12
(United States) 1994	Did not qualify								8	0	0	8	2	36
(France) 1998	Did not qualify								4	0	0	4	3	22
(South Korea) (Japan) 2002	Did not qualify								6	0	1	5	5	29
(Germany) 2006	Did not qualify								2	0	0	2	0	6
(South Africa) 2010	Did not qualify								2	0	1	1	0	7
(Brazil) 2014	Did not qualify								2	0	1	1	0	3
(Russia) 2018	Did not qualify								2	0	1	1	1	3
(Qatar) 2022	Did not qualify								2	0	0	2	1	4
(Canada) (Mexico) (United States) 2026	Did not qualify								8	1	1	6	2	26
(Morocco) (Portugal) (Spain) 2030	To be determined								To be determined					
(Saudi Arabia) 2034	To be determined								To be determined					
Total	—	0/20	—	—	—	—	—	—	40	1	5	34	15	148

=== AFC Asian Cup ===
AFC Asian Cup record									Qualification record					
Year	Result	Position	Pld	W	D*	L	GF	GA	Pld	W	D*	L	GF	GA
(Hong Kong) 1956	Withdrew								Withdrew					
(South Korea) 1960	Did not qualify								6	2	1	3	8	10
(Israel) 1964	Withdrew								Withdrew					
(Iran) 1968	Did not qualify								3	0	1	2	1	4
(Thailand) 1972	Withdrew								Withdrew					
(Iran) 1976	Withdrew								Withdrew					
(Kuwait) 1980	Withdrew								Withdrew					
(Singapore) 1984	Did not qualify								4	1	0	3	4	14
(Qatar) 1988	Did not qualify								4	0	0	4	1	12
(Japan) 1992	Did not qualify								2	0	0	2	0	9
(United Arab Emirates) 1996	Did not qualify								2	0	0	2	0	7
(Lebanon) 2000	Did not qualify								4	0	0	4	0	16
(China) 2004	Did not qualify								2	1	0	1	3	3
(Indonesia) (Malaysia) (Thailand) (Vietnam) 2007	Did not qualify								8	0	1	7	4	23
(Qatar) 2011	Did not enter								AFC Challenge Cup					
(Australia) 2015	Did not enter								AFC Challenge Cup					
(United Arab Emirates) 2019	Did not qualify								2	0	1	1	1	3
(Qatar) 2023	Did not qualify								2	0	0	2	1	4
(Saudi Arabia) 2027	Did not qualify								12	1	3	8	3	30
Total	—	0/19	—	—	—	—	—	—	51	5	7	39	26	135

=== AFC Challenge Cup ===
The AFC Challenge Cup was held every two years from 2006 through 2014.

AFC Challenge Cup record									Qualification record					
Year	Result	Position	Pld	W	D	L	GF	GA	Pld	W	D*	L	GF	GA
(Bangladesh) 2006	Group stage	10th	3	1	1	1	3	4	No qualification					
(India) 2008	Did not qualify								3	2	0	1	12	10
(Sri Lanka) 2010	Did not qualify								3	1	2	0	9	3
(Nepal) 2012	Did not qualify								3	1	0	2	3	6
(Maldives) 2014	Did not qualify								3	1	0	2	2	2
Total	Group stage	1/5	3	1	1	1	3	4	12	5	2	5	26	21

=== SAFF Championship ===
SAFF Championship record
Year	Result	Position	Pld	W	D*	L	GF	GA
(Pakistan) 1993	Fourth place	4th	3	0	2	1	2	6
(Sri Lanka) 1995	Group stage	5th	2	1	0	1	1	2
(Nepal) 1997	Third place	3rd	4	2	0	2	3	4
(India) 1999	Group stage	6th	2	0	0	2	0	6
(Bangladesh) 2003	Fourth place	4th	5	3	0	2	5	4
(Pakistan) 2005	Semi-finals	4th	4	2	1	1	2	1
(Sri Lanka) (Maldives) 2008	Group stage	8th	3	0	0	3	2	9
(Bangladesh) 2009	Group stage	5th	3	1	1	1	7	1
(India) 2011	Group stage	5th	3	0	3	0	1	1
(Nepal) 2013	Group stage	5th	3	1	1	1	3	3
(India) 2015	Withdrew							
(Bangladesh) 2018	Semi-finals	4th	4	2	0	2	6	5
(Maldives) 2021	Suspended							
(India) 2023	Group stage	8th	3	0	0	3	0	9
Total	Third place	12/14	39	12	8	19	32	52

=== FIFA ASEAN Cup ===
FIFA ASEAN Cup record
Year	Result	Position	Pld	W	D*	L	GF	GA
(Indonesia) 2026	Group stage	7th	3	0	1	2	4	10
Total	Group stage	1/1	3	0	1	2	4	10

=== Asian Games ===
Football at the Asian Games has been an under-23 tournament since 2002.

Asian Games record
Year	Position	Pld	W	D	L	GF	GA
(India) 1951	Did not enter						
(Philippines) 1954	Round 1	2	1	0	1	7	4
(Japan) 1958	Round 1	2	0	1	1	2	4
(Indonesia) 1962	Did not enter						
(Thailand) 1966	Did not enter						
(Thailand) 1970	Did not enter						
(Iran) 1974	Round 1	3	1	0	2	6	13
(Thailand) 1978	Did not enter						
(India) 1982	Did not enter						
(South Korea) 1986	Round 1	4	0	0	4	2	15
(China) 1990	Round 1	3	0	0	3	1	16
(Japan) 1994	Did not enter						
(Thailand) 1998	Did not enter						
2002 to present	See Pakistan national under-23 football team						
Total	5/13	14	2	1	11	18	52

=== South Asian Games ===
Football at the South Asian Games has been an under-23 tournament since 2004.

South Asian Games record
Year	Position	Pld	W	D*	L	GF	GA
(Nepal) 1984	Did not enter						
(Bangladesh) 1985	Fourth place	3	1	1	1	6	5
(India) 1987	Third place	3	2	1	0	2	0
(Pakistan) 1989	Champions	3	2	1	0	5	2
(Sri Lanka) 1991	Champions	3	2	1	0	3	0
(Bangladesh) 1993	Group stage	2	0	1	1	3	4
(India) 1995	Withdrew						
(Nepal) 1999	Group stage	3	1	0	2	5	9
2004 to present	See Pakistan national under-23 football team						
Total	6/8	17	8	5	4	24	20

=== RCD Cup ===
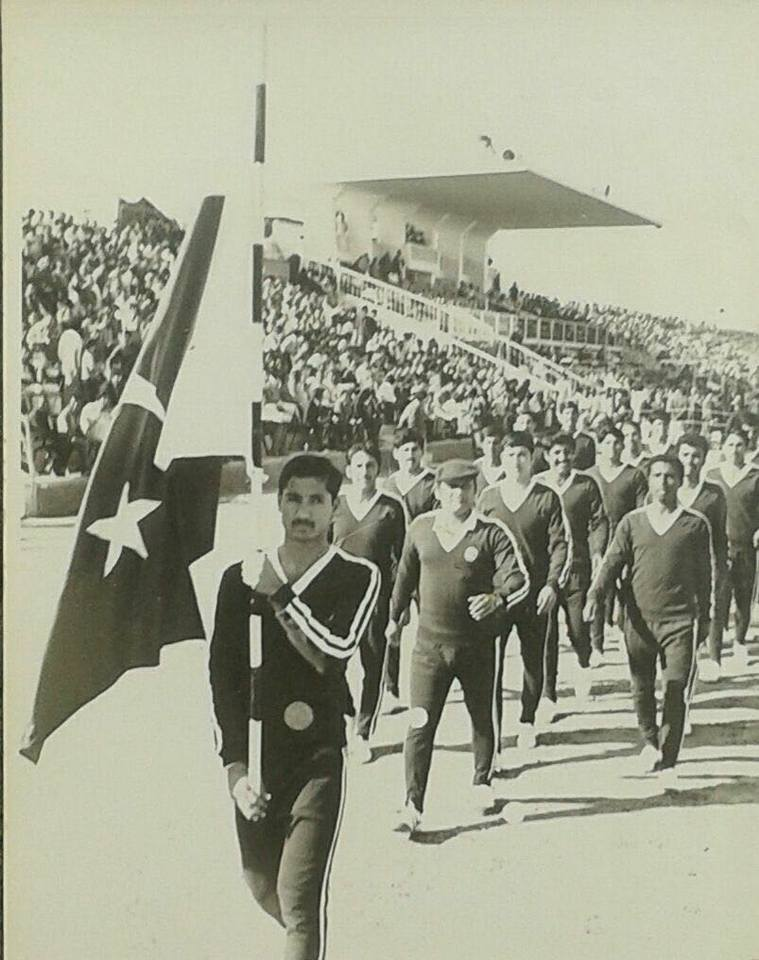
Pakistan at the 1974 RCD Cup

RCD Cup record
Year	Position	Pld	W	D*	L	GF	GA
(Iran) 1965	Third place	2	0	0	2	2	7
(Pakistan) 1967	Third place	2	0	0	2	4	9
(Turkey) 1969	Third place	2	0	0	2	4	8
(Iran) 1970	Third place	2	0	0	2	1	10
(Pakistan) 1974	Third place	2	0	1	1	3	4
Total	5/6	10	0	1	9	14	38

== Honours ==
=== Regional ===
- South Asian Games
  - (gold) Gold medal (2): 1989, 1991
  - (bronze) Bronze medal (1): 1987
- SAFF Championship
  - (silver) Second place (1): 2026
  - (bronze) Third place (1): 1997

=== Friendly ===
- RCD Cup
  - (bronze) Third place (5): 1965, 1967, 1969, 1970, 1974
- Asian Quadrangular Football Tournament
  - (gold) Champions (1): 1952
  - (silver) Runners-up (2): 1953, 1955
  - (bronze) Third place (1): 1954
- Diamond Jubilee Football Tournament
  - (gold) Champions (1): 2026
- Merdeka Cup
  - (silver) Runners-up (1): 1962
- Quaid-e-Azam International Tournament
  - (silver) Runners-up (2): 1976, 1986
  - (bronze) Third place (2): 1982, 1987
- Philippine Peace Cup
  - (bronze) Third place (1): 2013

== See also ==
- Football in Pakistan
  - Women's football in Pakistan
- Pakistan national under-23 football team
- Pakistan national under-20 football team
- Pakistan national under-17 football team
- Pakistan Football Federation
