= Pakistan national under-20 football team =

Men's under-20 national association football team representing Pakistan

Pakistan Under-20
- Nickname(s): Green Shirts, Pak Shaheen
- Association: Pakistan Football Federation
- Confederation: AFC (Asia)
- Sub-confederation: SAFF (South Asia)
- Head coach: Muhammad Essa
- Captain: Ali Zafar
- FIFA code: PAK
First colours	Second colours

First international
- Hong Kong 4–2 Pakistan (Bangkok, Thailand; 16 April 1962)

Biggest win
- Pakistan 4–0 Singapore (Bangkok, Thailand; 18 April 1962)

Biggest defeat
- Iran 14–0 Pakistan (Tehran, Iran; 6 November 2007)

FIFA U-20 World Cup
- Appearances: 0

AFC U-20 Asian Cup
- Appearances: 3 (first in 1962)
- Best result: Group Stage : (1962, 1973, 2000)

SAFF U-20 Championship
- Appearances: 1 (first in 2023)
- Best result: Runner-up (2023)
Medal record
SAFF Championship
Silver medal – second place	2023 Nepal

Pakistan national under-20 football team represents Pakistan in international youth football competitions in SAFF U-20 Championship, AFC U-20 Asian Cup and FIFA U-20 World Cup, as well as any other under-20 & under-19 international football tournaments. The team is operated under the Pakistan Football Federation.

The team have qualified for the AFC U-20 Asian Cup three previous times and is yet to qualify for FIFA U-20 World Cup. The team will also first take part in the SAFF U-20 Championship in the 2023 edition.

== History ==
=== 1960s ===
The Pakistan national youth team first participated at the 1962 AFC Youth Championship held in Bangkok, with former Kolkata Mohammedan player Hafiz Rashid as head coach, and Muhammad Saleem as captain. In the tournament, the team finished third in their group, After being defeated 2–4 by Hong Kong, the team won over Singapore by 4–0, with Muhammad Aslam and Turab Ali scoring a goal each, along with a brace from Muhammad Taqi. The next match against Indonesia was won by a scoreline of 3–0. Ismail Chichi scoring once, Aboojan and Mahmood Ahmad adding the other two goals. they were eventually defeated by South Korea 0–4. Finishing behind Indonesia and South Korea.

In August 1965, the youth national team coached by Moideen Kutty, and captained by Javid Muhammad toured the Soviet Union, where they played several test matches, losing 1–5 against Kirovobad Club at Baker, where Sardar Aslam converted a penalty, 2–4 against Ararat Club at Yerevan, with Ayub Dar and Javid scoring, 1–4 against Volga Club at Kalinin, 2–9 against Shinnik Club at Yaroslavl, reducing the margin through Younus and Ayub Dar. And 1–3 against Spartak Club at Orel, the lone goal scored by Younus.

=== 1970s ===
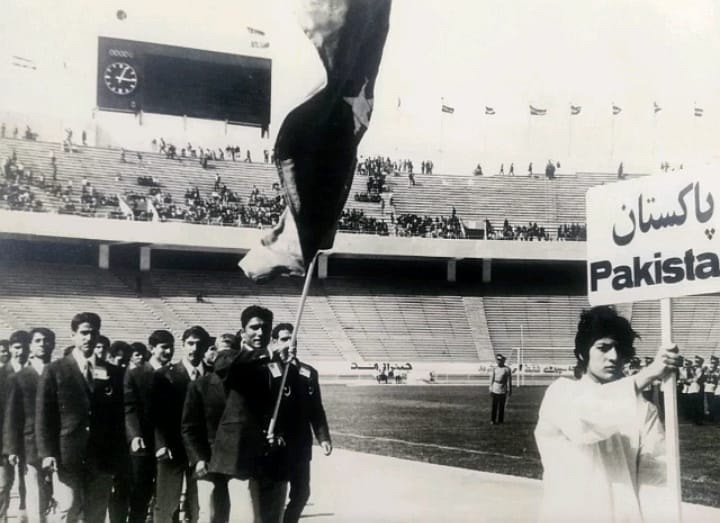
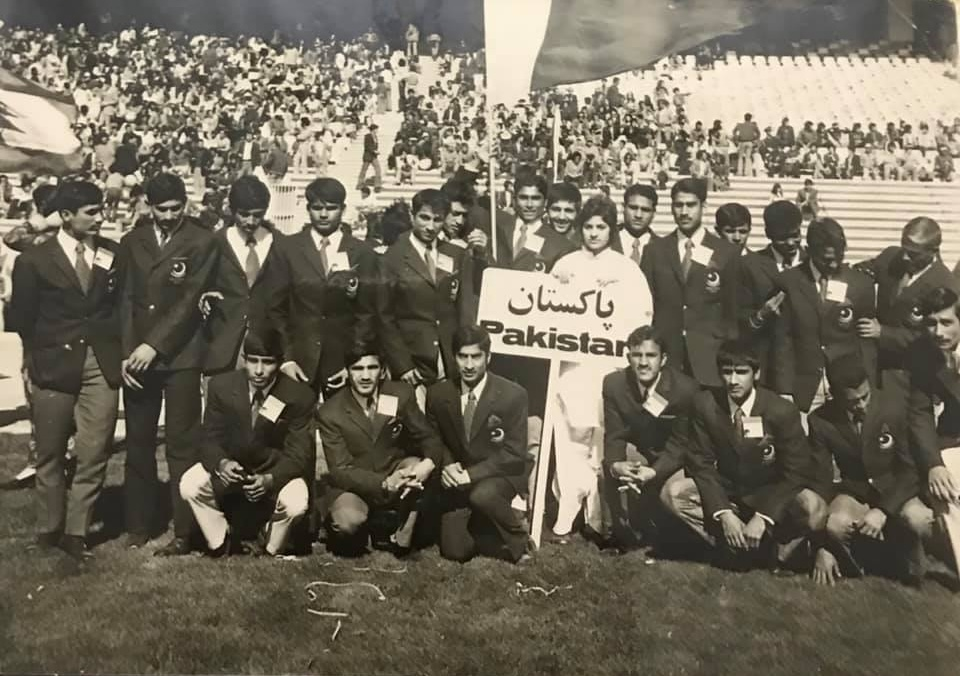
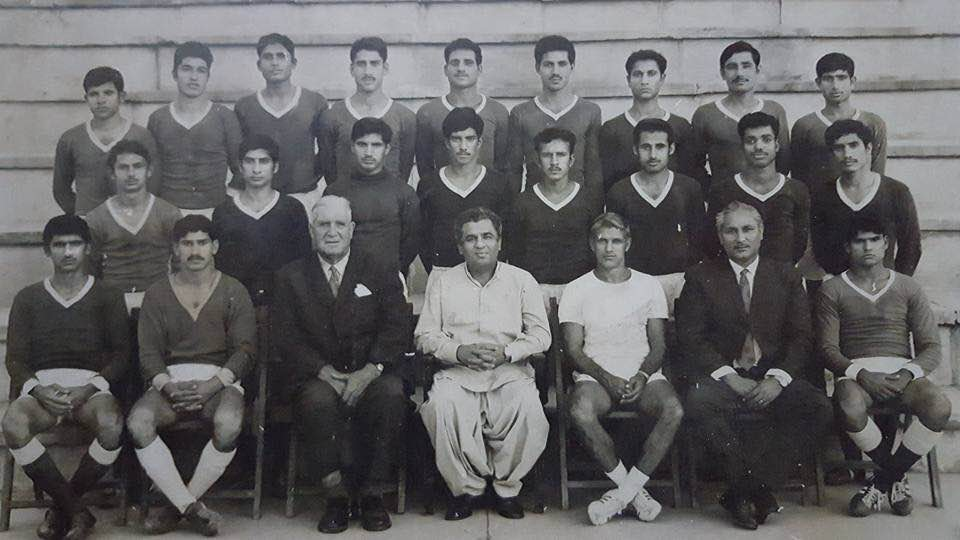
Pakistan at the 1973 AFC Youth Championship

After a decade-long gap and the fall of Dhaka, the team participated at the 1973 AFC Youth Championship in Tehran led by senior team head coach Muhammad Amin, and Muhammad Idrees as captain. Pakistan would face defeats against Saudi Arabia, Indonesia, and Burma. With Pakistan's only goal of the competition from Afzal Qasim against Saudi Arabia.

In February 1975, Pakistan Youth took part in the U-20 Tournament of the Crown Prince in Iran, failing to advance in the group A consisting of the youth teams of Arsenal, Hungary and Iran.

=== 1980s ===
In October 1982, the team coached by former Pakistan international defender Ali Muhammad Sr. featured at the 1982 AFC Youth Championship qualification group B held in Kathmandu, finishing last in group B behind Iraq, Bahrain and North Yemen.

At the 1985 AFC Youth Championship qualification in Dammam in December 1985, the team again failed to get past the group A consisting of Saudi Arabia, Bahrain, Qatar, and Syria. The next year at the 1986 AFC Youth Championship qualification group 5 in home venue in Quetta, the team lagged behind India and Nepal.

=== 1990s ===
At the 1990 AFC Youth Championship qualification, Pakistan was moved from group 4 to group 5, due to strained relations with India. In the group matches held in Dhaka, the team ended last behind South Korea, Thailand, Bangladesh, and Malaysia. In the 1992 AFC Youth Championship qualification, the team this time played in the group 3 stage matches in Kannur, India, finishing fourth behind India, Bangladesh and Nepal, and ahead of Maldives.

Amidst infighting within the Pakistan Football Federation president Mian Muhammad Azhar and PFF General Secretary Hafiz Salman Butt in 1994, the division between the two factions split the PFF into rival groups. Each side sent its own Pakistan youth teams to compete in the 1994 AFC Youth Championship qualification, which resulted in a FIFA-imposed ban on the PFF.

At the 1996 AFC Youth Championship qualification group 5 matches in Kannur, the team failed to advance behind India and Sri Lanka. Two years later at the 1998 AFC Youth Championship qualification in group 6 in Bangalore, the team finished third behind India and Kyrgyzstan, and ahead of Maldives and Bhutan.

=== 2000s ===
After ending successful in the group 5 qualifiers, the team competed in 2000 AFC Youth Championship under Englishman John Layton, and with players such as Muhammad Essa and Jaffar Khan.

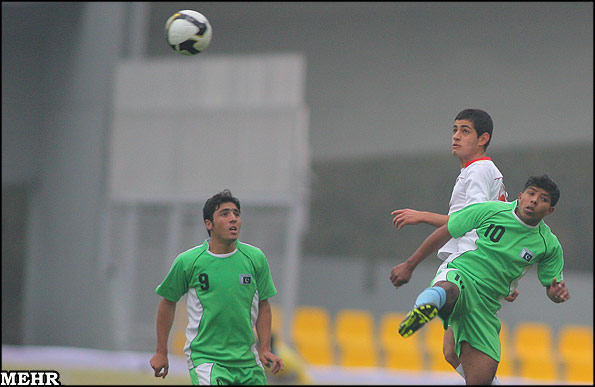
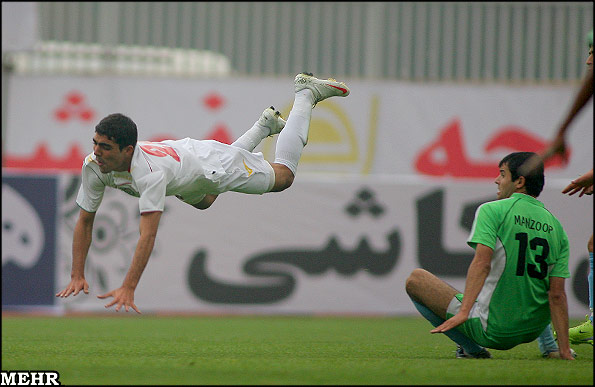
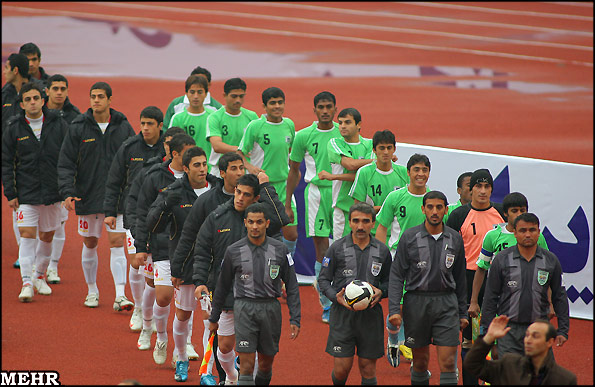
Pakistan during 2010 AFC U-19 Championship qualification against Iran on 8 December 2009

Pakistan hosted the 2002 AFC Youth Championship qualification group 5 matches at the People Football Stadium in Karachi, finishing second behind Bangladesh due to only one goal difference, thus failing to qualify. The subsequent 2004, 2006, 2008 AFC Championship qualifying editions again ended in disappointment.

At the 2010 AFC U-19 Championship qualification held in December 2009, Pakistan was stripped of the hosting rights, and the group D matches were held in Iran.

=== 2010s ===
After failing in 2012, and 2014 AFC Championship qualifying editions, Pakistan withdrew in the 2016 AFC U-19 Championship qualification. The team missed international exposure for the next years, due to internal crisis within the Pakistan Football Federation, and the consequent suspension by FIFA on 10 October 2017. FIFA restored membership of PFF on 13 March 2018. At the 2020 AFC U-19 Championship qualification in November 2019 held in Oman, the team ended last in group A.

=== 2020s ===
The team again missed international exposure due to another suspension on the PFF in April 2021. The suspension was lifted on 29 June 2022.

Pakistan vs India at the 2026 SAFF U-20 Championship

Pakistan in Malé during a friendly against Maldives in 2013

In 2023, the team participated for the first time at the SAFF U-19 Championship. The team finished as runner-up of the tournament after falling in the final against India. The team did not enter at the 2025 AFC U-20 Asian Cup qualification.

== Coaching staff ==
=== Current staff ===
Position	Name
Head coach	(Pakistan) Muhammad Essa
Assistant coach	(Pakistan) Muhammad Ashfaq
Goalkeeping coach	(Pakistan) Jaffar Khan
Team Manager	N/A

=== Coaching history ===
Year	Head coach
1962	(Pakistan) Hafiz Rashid
1965	(Pakistan) Moideen Kutty
1973	(Pakistan) Muhammad Amin
1975	Unknown
1982	(Pakistan) Ali Muhammad Sr.
1985	Unknown
1986	Unknown
1990	Unknown
1992	(Pakistan) Muhammad Naeem
1996	Unknown
2000	(England) John Layton
2002	(England) John Layton
2003	Unknown
2005	Unknown
2007	(Pakistan) Bashir Ahmed
2009	(Pakistan) Gohar Zaman
2011	(Pakistan) Shahzad Anwar
2013	(Pakistan) Nasir Ismail
2019	(Pakistan) Nasir Ismail
2023	(England) Shadab Iftikhar
2026	(Pakistan) Shahzad Anwar
2026	(Pakistan) Muhammad Essa

== Players ==
=== Current squad ===
- The 23-man squad was call-up for the 2026 SAFF U-20 Championship.

No.	Pos.	Player	Date of birth (age)	Caps	Goals	Club
	GK	Zulqurnain				(Pakistan Football Federation) POPO FC
	GK	Adil Ali Khan				(Pakistan Football Federation)
	GK	Kashif				(Pakistan Football Federation)
	DF	Umar Javed				(Pakistan Football Federation) POPO FC
	DF	Zarib Haider				(Pakistan Football Federation) POPO FC
	DF	Majid Ali				(Pakistan Football Federation) POPO FC
	DF	Ubaid Ullah				(Pakistan Football Federation)
	DF	Abdul Khaliq				(Pakistan Football Federation)
	DF	Abdul Rehman	25 February 2008 (age 18)			(Pakistan Football Federation) POPO FC
	DF	Sheraz Khalid				(Pakistan Football Federation) Karachi United
	MF	Aabis Raza				(Pakistan Football Federation) POPO FC
	MF	Ali Zafar				(Pakistan Football Federation) POPO FC
	MF	Zain Imran	28 May 2009 (age 17)			(Football Australia) Melbourne Victory FC Youth
	MF	Shahab Ahmed				(Pakistan Football Federation) POPO FC
	MF	Khobaib Khan				(Pakistan Football Federation)
	MF	Owais Ilyas				(Pakistan Football Federation)
	MF	Muhammad Junaid				(Pakistan Football Federation)
	MF	Mansoor Khan				(Pakistan Football Federation) POPO FC
	FW	Najeeb Ullah	2 August 2007 (age 19)			(Pakistan Football Federation) Khan Research Laboratories
	FW	Abdul Samad Khan	2008 or 2009 (age 17–18)			(Association of Football Federations of Azerbaijan) Qarabağ
	FW	Sajjad Hussain				(Pakistan Football Federation) POPO FC
	FW	Muhammad Abdullah				(Pakistan Football Federation)
	FW	Faham Ahmed				(Pakistan Football Federation)

== Results and fixtures ==
Matches in the last 12 months, and future scheduled matches

Win Draw Loss Fixture

=== 2026 ===
24 March 2026 2026 SAFF U-20 GS	Bangladesh	2–0	Pakistan	Malé, Maldives
	R. Sullivan 54', 67'	Report		Stadium: National Football Stadium; Attendance: 2,550; Referee: Mohamed Rideewita Withana Chirantha (Sri Lanka)

26 March 2026 2026 SAFF U-20 GS	India	3–0	Pakistan	Malé, Maldives
	V. Yadav 3'; Dodum 64', 88' (pen.)	Report		Stadium: National Football Stadium; Attendance: 334; Referee: Virendha Rai (Bhutan)

9 June 2026 Friendly	Azerbaijan	1–0	Pakistan	Gabala, Azerbaijan
	Hikmat Cabrayilzada 31'	Report		Stadium: Gabala City Stadium

== Competitive records ==
=== FIFA U-20 World Cup ===
FIFA U-20 World Cup record
Host/Year	Result	Position	Pld	W	D*	L	GF	GA
FIFA World Youth Championship
(Tunisia) 1977 to (Netherlands) 2005	did not Qualify							
FIFA U-20 World Cup
(Canada) 2007 to (Argentina) 2023	did not Qualify							
(Chile) 2025	did not enter							
(Azerbaijan) (Uzbekistan) 2027	To be determined							
Total	0/25	–	0	0	0	0	0	0

=== AFC U-20 Asian Cup ===
AFC U-20 Asian Cup records
Host/Year	Result	Position	Pld	W	D*	L	GF	GA
(Malaysia) 1959 to (Thailand) 1961	did not enter							
(Thailand) 1962	Group Stage	5th	4	2	0	2	9	8
(Federation of Malaya) 1963 to (Thailand) 1972	did not enter							
(Iran) 1973	Group Stage	14th	3	0	0	3	1	12
(Thailand) 1974 to (Bangladesh) 1978	did not enter							
(Thailand) 1980 to (United Arab Emirates) 1992	did not qualify							
(Indonesia) 1994	did not enter							
(South Korea) 1996	did not qualify							
(Thailand) 1998	did not qualify							
(Iran) 2000	Group Stage	7th	4	1	0	3	2	15
(Qatar) 2002 to (Myanmar) 2014	did not qualify							
(Bahrain) 2016 to (China) 2018	did not enter							
(Uzbekistan) 2020	did not qualify							
(Uzbekistan) 2023 to (China) 2025	did not enter							
Total	3/41	–	11	3	0	8	12	35

=== SAFF U-20 Championship ===
SAFF U-20/U-19/U-18 Championship record
Host/Year	Result	Position	Pld	W	D*	L	GF	GA
(Nepal) 2015 to (India) 2022	did not enter							
(Nepal) 2023	Runner-up	2/6	4	1	2	1	2	4
Total	Runner-up	2nd	4	1	2	1	2	4

== Honours ==
=== SAFF ===
- SAFF U-20/U-19/U-18 Championship
  - (silver) Runners-up (1): 2023

== See also ==
- Pakistan Football Federation
- Pakistan national football team
- Pakistan national under-23 football team
- Pakistan national under-17 football team
