= Futebol Clube SKA Brasil =

FC SKA
- Full name: Futebol Clube SKA Brasil
- Nickname: Águia
- Founded: 7 January 1971; 55 years ago (as Monte Negro Futebol Clube); 8 December 1992; 33 years ago (as Osasco Futebol Clube); 13 June 2019; 6 years ago (as FC SKA Brasil)
- Ground: Estádio Gabriel Marques da Silva
- Capacity: 7,500
- Head coach: José Nogueira Jr.
- 2024: Paulista Série A4, 4th of 16
Home colours	Away colours

Futebol Clube SKA Brasil is a Brazilian football club based in Santana de Parnaíba, São Paulo. The team compete in Campeonato Paulista Segunda Divisão, the fourth tier of the São Paulo state football league.

== History ==
The club was founded on 7 January 1971 as Monte Negro Futebol Clube, and professionalized its football department in 1979, when they competed in the Campeonato Paulista Série A3. They competed for the last time in a professional competition as Monte Negro in 1992, when they participated in the Campeonato Paulista Segunda Divisão. After several financial difficulties, the club was founded again on 8 December 1992 as Osasco Futebol Clube.

On 13 June 2019, the team once again rebranded, becoming Futebol Clube SKA Brasil, after the SKA, a software engineering-related company, decided to acquire the club. Edmílson, a former and famous FC Barcelona and Brazil national team player is the club chairman.

The club has recently invested in youth development, participating in under-15 and under-17 tournaments of different kinds. It also became the first foreign team to ever play in the J-Village Cup, an invitational friendly tournament held in Japan for under-18 teams.

== Stadium ==
The team played the 2020 season at the Estádio José Liberatti, as the Estádio Gabriel Marques da Silva was still under repairs. After the stadium renovation was completed on the end of 2020, the team officially made the Estádio Municipal Prefeito Gabriel Marques da Silva, located at Santana de Parnaíba, where the club is established since 2021. FC SKA already had a training center in there, which ended up inducing the team to establish themselves at the municipality.

== Honours ==
=== Women's football ===
- Campeonato Paulista de Futebol Feminino - Divisão Especial
  - Winners (1): 2022
