= 2018–19 KRL F.C. season =

2018–19 season season
- Owner: Khan Research Laboratories
- Chairman: Tahir Ikram
- Head coach: Sajjad Mehmood
- Stadium: KRL Football Stadium
- Pakistan Premier League: 1st
- National Challenge Cup: Group stage
- Top goalscorer: League: Iftikhar A. Khan (12); All: Iftikhar A. Khan (12)
Home colours	Away colours

The 2018–19 season is Khan Research Laboratories Football Club's 23rd competitive season, 22nd consecutive season in the top flight of Pakistani football, 12th consecutive season in the Premier League, and 23rd year in existence as a football club.

== Month by month review ==
=== September ===
Khan Research Laboratories started their season with a 3–0 win over National Bank with a hat-trick scored by Iftikhar Ali Khan. In its second and last league game of September, Khan Research Laboratories drew 0–0 to Muslim.

Position at the end of September

Pos	Team	Pld	W	D	L	GF	GA	GD	Pts
1	Khan Research Laboratories	2	1	1	0	3	0	+3	4

=== October ===
Khan Research Laboratories faced newly promoted Sui Northern Gas on 4 October, the match ended in a 1–1 draw with Iftikhar Ali Khan scoring his fourth goal in three matches. Their fourth match of the season was a 3–0 win over newly promoted Baloch Nushki, Izharullah Khan, Umair Ali and Iftikhar Ali Khan scored for Khan Research Laboratories. On 21 October, Khan Research Laboratories faced rivals K-Electric in match that ended 1–1, with Izharullah Khan scoring for Khan Research Laboratories. On 24 October, Khan Research Laboratories faced their longtime-rivals WAPDA, with Khan Research Laboratories winning the game 1–0 after a late-goal from Umair Ali. In their last match of the October, the club faced Pakistan Air Force in a 1–1 draw, after Danish Hameed's goal was equalised by Pakistan Air Force's Irfan Ali at 63rd minute.

Position at the end of October

Pos	Team	Pld	W	D	L	GF	GA	GD	Pts
4	Khan Research Laboratories	7	3	4	0	10	3	+7	13

=== November ===
On 1 November, Khan Research Laboratories faced Afghan Chaman, which the club won 3–0 with attacking trio Iftikhar Ali Khan, Izharullah Khan and Umair Ali scoring for Khan Research Laboratories. On 6 November, Khan Research Laboratories defeated struggling Karachi Port Trust 1–0 with winger Umair Ali scoring a late goal for the club. On 16 November, Khan Research Laboratories defeated Pakistan Navy 3–0, with goals from Iftikhar Ali Khan, Izharullah Khan and Zaid Umar. On 19 November, the club faced longtime-rivals Pakistan Army in a 1–1, with Muhammad Shahid scoring equaliser for Khan Research Laboratories at 43rd minute. On 23 November, the club extended its unbeaten run to 12 matches after defeating newly-form and promoted Civil Aviation Authority 2–1 with Iftikhar Ali Khan and captain Zia Us-Salam scoring for the club. On 26 November, Khan Research Laboratories' unbeaten run came to an end after losing 1–0 Sui Southern Gas, with Habib-ur-Rehman scoring the winning goal of the game. On 29 November, Khan Research Laboratories defeated National Bank 1–0 courtesy of an own goal from Misbah-ul-Hassan.

Position at the end of November

Pos	Team	Pld	W	D	L	GF	GA	GD	Pts
1	Khan Research Laboratories	14	8	5	1	21	6	+15	29

=== December ===
Khan Research Laboratories faced Muslim in their first match of December, winning the match 2–1 with Umair Ali scoring in 12th minute and Muhammad Shahid scoring a penalty in the 92nd minute of the match, which caused a mob of angry people attacking the referee. On 6 December, Khan Research Laboratories defeated Sui Northern Gas 3–1, Waqar Baloch, Iftikhar Ali Khan and Umair Ali scoring the goals. On 10 December, they defeated Baloch Nushki 2–0 with Imran Khan and Zaid Umar scoring for the club. Khan Research Laboratories ended their next three matches with three consecutive draws, 1–1 draw with rivals K-Electric and WAPDA with Junaid Ahmed scoring against K-Electric and Iftikhar Ali Khan against WAPDA and a 0–0 with Pakistan Air Force. On 23 December, Khan Research Laboratories defeated Afghan Chaman 5–0 with Imran Khan and Zeeshan Siddiqui scoring a brace and Iftikhar Ali Khan also scoring, taking his tally to 11 goals. The club played a goalless draw against Karachi Port Trust on 26 December.

Position at the end of December

Pos	Team	Pld	W	D	L	GF	GA	GD	Pts
1	Khan Research Laboratories	22	12	9	1	35	10	+25	45

=== January ===
The club lost two consecutive matches for the first time in the season, losing 1–0 Pakistan Army and Pakistan Navy. On 9 January, Khan Research Laboratories defeated Civil Aviation Authority 1–0 with a 23rd-minute goal from Umair Ali, leaving them 3 points behind first placed Pakistan Air Force and 1 point behind second placed Sui Southern Gas. On the final day of the league, Khan Research Laboratories defeated title contenders Sui Southern Gas 4–0, with Iftikhar Ali Khan and Junaid Ahmed scoring a goal each and Izharullah Khan scoring a brace. The victory leveled Khan Research Laboratories with first place Pakistan Air Force on 51 points, although Khan Research Laboratories won the league on goal difference, having a goal difference of +28 against Pakistan Air Force's +27.

Position at the end of January

Pos	Team	Pld	W	D	L	GF	GA	GD	Pts
1	Khan Research Laboratories	26	14	9	3	40	12	+28	51

== Club ==
=== Coaching staff ===
Position	Staff
Manager	(Pakistan) Ayaz Butt
Assistant Manager	(Pakistan) Saeed Sr.
Head Coach	(Pakistan) Sajjad Mehmood
Assistant Coach	(Pakistan) Kamran Khan
Local Coach	(Pakistan) Muhammad Shahid
Goalkeeper Coach	(Pakistan) Muhammad Zeeshan
Scout	(Pakistan) Abdul Ghaffar

Source: Global Sports Archive

=== Other information ===
Owner	(Pakistan) Khan Research Laboratories
Chairman	(Pakistan) Ayaz Butt

Source: Global Sports Archive

== First team squad ==
As of 13 January 2019.

Squad No.	Name	Nationality	Position(s)	Since	Date of birth (age)	Signed from	Games played	Goals scored
Goalkeepers
1	Tanveer Mumtaz	(Pakistan)	GK	2018	5 March 1994 (aged 24)	(Pakistan) Sui Southern Gas	84	0
23	Nasrullah Khan	(Pakistan)	GK	2018	20 June 1998 (aged 20)	(Pakistan) Muslim	3	0
24	Hasan Riaz	(Pakistan)	GK	2018	2 September 1994 (aged 24)	(Pakistan) Higher Education Commission	0	0
Defenders
2	Muhammad Shahid (vc)	(Pakistan)	RB	2010	10 November 1984 (aged 33)	(Pakistan) WAPDA	139	2
3	Arslan Ali	(Pakistan)	LB	2018	20 December 1998 (aged 19)	(Pakistan) Habib Bank	21	0
5	Waqar Baloch	(Pakistan)	CB	2018	28 November 1996 (aged 21)	(Pakistan) Sui Southern Gas	21	1
12	Abdul Qadeer	(Pakistan)	CB	2018	4 April 1999 (aged 19)	(Pakistan) WAPDA	9	0
14	Mazdaq Masood	(Pakistan)	CB	2018	23 January 1994 (aged 24)	(Pakistan) WAPDA	19	0
15	Imran Khan	(Pakistan)	CB	2018	7 January 1994 (aged 24)	Pakistan Airlines	26	3
18	Ghulam Fareed	(Pakistan)	RB / LB	2018	20 August 1991 (aged 27)	(Pakistan) WAPDA	14	0
25	Ali Agha	(Pakistan)	CB	2018	15 May 1997 (aged 21)	(Pakistan) Omid Hazara FC	6	0
Midfielders
4	Rajab Ali	(Pakistan)	CM / DM	2018	9 April 1989 (aged 29)	(Pakistan) Pak Hazara FC	17	0
7	Zia Us-Salam (c)	(Pakistan)	CM / RM	2010	4 February 1990 (aged 28)	Academy	109	6
10	Umair Ali	(Pakistan)	AM / LW	2018	9 September 1991 (aged 27)	(Pakistan) Sui Southern Gas	19	8
11	Yousaf Ahmed	(Pakistan)	LW / AM / RW	2018	6 November 1997 (aged 20)	Academy	1	0
17	Zaid Umer	(Pakistan)	CM	2018	22 September 2001 (aged 17)	(Pakistan) Civil Aviation Authority	11	2
19	Junaid Ahmed	(Pakistan)	AM	2018	7 July 1999 (aged 19)	(Pakistan) Karachi Port Trust	22	2
21	Muhammad Adil	(Pakistan)	AM / RW	2018	9 July 1992 (aged 26)	(Australia) Hawkesbury City	71	24
22	Abdul Razzaq	(Pakistan)	RW / AM	2014	26 May 1998 (aged 20)	Academy	7	0
Strikers
6	Izharullah	(Pakistan)	CF	2014	3 November 1989 (aged 28)	Academy	41	7
8	Iftikhar Ali Khan	(Pakistan)	CF	2018	1 February 1992 (aged 26)	(Pakistan) WAPDA	25	12
13	Hafiz Shah Wali	(Pakistan)	CF	2018	10 August 1990 (aged 28)	(Pakistan) Muslim	20	0
16	Danish Hameed	(Pakistan)	CF	2018	20 March 1995 (aged 23)	(Pakistan) Sui Southern Gas	16	1
20	Zeeshan Siddiqui	(Pakistan)	CF	2018	25 December 1993 (aged 24)	Academy	7	2

== Season ==
=== National Challenge Cup ===
Khan Research Laboratories were the defending champions of the National Challenge Cup, they were knocked out in group stages after losing 1–0 to Pakistan Civil Aviation Authority in the final group match.

==== Table ====
Pos	Team	Pld	W	D	L	GF	GA	GD	Pts	Qualification
1	Civil Aviation Authority	2	2	0	0	4	1	+3	6	Advance to Knockout round
2	Khan Research Laboratories	2	1	0	1	3	1	+2	3	
3	Sindh Government Press	2	0	0	2	1	6	−5	0	

Updated to match(es) played on 21 April 2018. Source:

==== Matches ====
25 April 2018 Group Stage	Khan Research Laboratories	3–0	Sindh Government Press	Karachi
16:30 PST	Umair Ali 21'; Izharullah 35'; Zeeshan Siddiqui 39'			Stadium: All Brothers Football Ground; Referee: Jehangir Khan

3 May 2018 Group stage	Pakistan Civil Aviation Authority	1–0	Khan Research Laboratories	Karachi
16:30 PST	Zaid Umar 84'			Stadium: All Brothers Football Ground; Referee: Jehangir Khan

=== Premier League ===
==== Table ====
Pos	Team	Pld	W	D	L	GF	GA	GD	Pts
1	Khan Research Laboratories (C)	26	14	9	3	40	12	+28	51
2	Pakistan Airforce	26	14	9	3	40	13	+27	51
3	Sui Southern Gas	26	15	5	6	32	16	+16	50
4	Pakistan Army	26	12	10	4	38	19	+19	46
5	WAPDA	26	13	6	7	32	18	+14	45

Source: Soccerway.com
Rules for classification: 1) points; 2) head-to-head points; 3) head-to-head goal difference; 4) goal difference; 5) number of goals scored; 6) drawing of lots
(C) Champions

==== Matches ====
26 September 2018 1	Khan Research Laboratories	3–0	National Bank	Multan
20:00 PST	Iftikhar A. Khan 23', 44', 76'; Zia Us-Salam (yellow card) 58'	Report		Stadium: Qilla Kohna Qasim Bagh Stadium; Attendance: 1,500; Referee: Adnan Anjum

30 September 2018 2	Khan Research Laboratories	0–0	Muslim	Multan
20:00 PST	Zeeshan Siddiqui (yellow card) 77'	Report		Stadium: Qilla Kohna Qasim Bagh Stadium; Attendance: 1,500; Referee: Adnan Anjum

4 October 2018 3	Khan Research Laboratories	1–1	Sui Northern Gas	Multan
20:00 PST	M. Shahid (yellow card) 21'; Iftikhar A. Khan 44'; A. Qadeer (yellow card) 76'	Report	Sada Bahar (yellow card) 45'; Samad Khan 64'; Umer Farooq (yellow card) 61'; Aleem Sarwar (yellow card) 68'	Stadium: Qilla Kohna Qasim Bagh Stadium; Attendance: 1,500; Referee: Jahangir Khan

12 October 2018 4	Khan Research Laboratories	3–0	Baloch Nushki	Multan
22:45 PST	Izharullah 10'; Umair Ali 59'; Iftikhar A. Khan 61'	Report		Stadium: Qilla Kohna Qasim Bagh Stadium; Attendance: 1,500; Referee: Muzammil Hussain

21 October 2018 5	Khan Research Laboratories	1–1	K-Electric	Lahore
12:30 PST	Izharullah 11'; Iftikhar A. Khan (yellow card) 29'; Umair Ali (yellow card) 51'; Zia Us-Salam (yellow card) 58'	Report	Rasool 21'; Akber Ali (yellow card) 28'	Stadium: Punjab Stadium; Attendance: 1,500; Referee: Muhammad Ahmad Rauf

24 October 2018 6	Khan Research Laboratories	1–0	WAPDA	Lahore
22:45 PST	Junaid Ahmed (yellow card) 49'; Umair Ali 73'	Report	Adnan Saeed (yellow card) 30'; Ahmed Faheem (yellow card) 44'	Stadium: Punjab Stadium; Attendance: 1,200; Referee: Touqeer Aslam

27 October 2018 7	Pakistan Airforce	1–1	Khan Research Laboratories	Lahore
22:45 PST	Mehdi Hassan (yellow card) 42'; Irfan 63'; M. Mujahid (yellow card) 79'	Report	Danish Ahmed 43'; Mazdooq Masood (yellow card) 50'; Waqar Baloch (yellow card) 68'	Stadium: Punjab Stadium; Attendance: 1,500; Referee: Jahangir Khan

1 November 2018 8	Khan Research Laboratories	3–0	Afghan Chaman	Lahore
15:00 PST	Waqar Baloch (yellow card) 57'; Iftikhar A. Khan 76'Izharullah 77'; Umair Ali 90+2'	Report	Sohrab Khan (yellow card) 79'; Khan Jr. (yellow card) 82' (yellow-red card) 82'	Stadium: Punjab Stadium; Attendance: 400; Referee: Touqeer Aslam

6 November 2018 9	Khan Research Laboratories	1–0	Karachi Port Trust	Lahore
12:30 PST	Muhammad Adil (yellow card) 61'; Umair Ali 81'	Report	M. Waseem (yellow card) 36'	Stadium: Punjab Stadium; Attendance: 350; Referee: Jahangir Khan

9 November 2018 10	Khan Research Laboratories	1–0	Ashraf Sugar Mills	Lahore
15:00 PST	Umair Ali 35'	Report		Stadium: Punjab Stadium; Attendance: 300; Referee: Muhammad Ahmad Rauf

16 November 2018 11	Pakistan Navy	0–3	Khan Research Laboratories	Karachi
15:00 PST		Report	Izharullah 21'; Iftikhar A. Khan 30'; Zaid Umar 75'	Stadium: KMC Football Stadium; Attendance: 5,000; Referee: Dilawar Khan

19 November 2018 12	Pakistan Army	1–1	Khan Research Laboratories	Karachi
14:30 PST	Umar Waqar 25'	Report	M. Shahid 43'; Waqar Baloch (yellow card) 68'	Stadium: KPT Stadium; Attendance: 3,500; Referee: Jahangir Khan

23 November 2018 13	Khan Research Laboratories	2–1	Civil Aviation Authority	Karachi
14:30 PST	Iftikhar A. Khan 9'; Rajab Ali (yellow card) 57'; Zia Us-Salam 60'; Mazdaq Masood (yellow card) 85'	Report	Mudassir Ali (yellow card) 28'; M. Naeem 87'	Stadium: KMC Football Stadium; Referee: Muhammad Ahmad Rauf

26 November 2018 14	Sui Southern Gas	1–0	Khan Research Laboratories	Karachi
15:00 PST	Habib-ur-Rehman 13'; Saddam (yellow card) 59'	Report	M. Shahid	Stadium: KMC Football Stadium; Referee: Jahangir Khan

=== Summary ===
Competition	P	W	D	L	GF	GA	CS	Booked	(yellow card) (yellow-red card)	Sent off (straight red)
Pakistan Premier League	26	14	9	3	40	12	14	32	0	0
National Challenge Cup	2	1	0	1	3	1	1	0	0	0
Total	28	15	9	4	43	13	15	32	0	0

== Statistics ==
=== Appearances ===
No.	Pos.	Name	Premier League		National Challenge Cup		Total		Discipline	
No.	Pos.	Name	Apps	Goals	Apps	Goals	Apps	Goals	Yellow card	Red card
1	GK	(Pakistan) Tanveer Mumtaz	26	0	0	0	26	0	0	0
2	DF	(Pakistan) Muhammad Shahid	24	2	2	0	26	2	4	0
3	DF	(Pakistan) Arslan Ali	21 (2)	0	2	0	23 (2)	0	1	0
4	MF	(Pakistan) Rajab Ali	17 (10)	0	2	0	19 (10)	0	1	0
5	DF	(Pakistan) Waqar Baloch	21	1	0	0	21	1	6	0
6	FW	(Pakistan) Izharullah	26	6	2	1	28	7	0	0
7	MF	(Pakistan) Zia Us-Salam	26	1	1	0	27	1	2	0
8	FW	(Pakistan) Iftikhar Ali Khan	25 (6)	12	0	0	25 (6)	12	2	0
9	FW	(Pakistan) Rizwan Asif	0	0	2	0	0	0	0	0
10	FW	(Pakistan) Umair Ali	19	8	2	1	21	9	2	0
11	MF	(Pakistan) Yousaf Ahmed	1 (1)	0	0	0	1 (1)	0	0	0
12	DF	(Pakistan) Abdul Qadeer	9	0	0	0	9	0	1	0
13	FW	(Pakistan) Hafiz Wali Shah	20 (11)	0	0	0	20 (11)	0	3	0
14	DF	(Pakistan) Mazdaq Maqsood	19	0	0	0	19	0	3	0
15	DF	(Pakistan) Imran Khan	26	0	2	0	28	0	3	0
16	FW	(Pakistan) Danish Hameed	16 (11)	1	1 (1)	0	17 (12)	1	0	0
17	MF	(Pakistan) Zaid Umar	11 (11)	2	0	0	11 (11)	2	0	0
18	DF	(Pakistan) Ghulam Fareed	14 (3)	0	2	0	16 (13)	0	1	0
19	MF	(Pakistan) Junaid Ahmed	22	2	1	0	23	2	2	0
20	FW	(Pakistan) Zeeshan Siddiqui	7 (4)	2	2 (1)	1	9 (5)	3	1	0
21	MF	(Pakistan) Muhammad Adil	6 (5)	0	2	0	8 (5)	0	1	0
22	MF	(Pakistan) Abdul Razzaq	7 (2)	0	0	0	7 (2)	0	0	0
23	GK	(Pakistan) Nasrullah	3 (2)	0	0	0	3 (2)	0	0	0
24	GK	(Pakistan) Hassan Riaz	0	0	2	0	2	0	0	0
25	DF	(Pakistan) Ali Agha	6 (3)	0	0	0	6 (3)	0	1	0
26	MF	(Pakistan) Yasir Afridi	0	0	0	0	0	0	0	0
Players who left the club in July transfer window
14	DF	(Pakistan) Imran Khan	0	0	2	0	2	0	0	0

Last updated: 13 January 2019.
Source: KRL F.C.

=== Top scorers ===
The list is sorted by shirt number when total goals are equal.

Rnk	Pos	No.	Player	Premier League	National Challenge Cup	Total
1	FW	8	(Pakistan) Iftikhar Ali Khan	12	0	12
2	FW	9	(Pakistan) Umair Ali	8	1	9
3	FW	6	(Pakistan) Izharullah	6	1	7
4	FW	20	(Pakistan) Zeeshan Siddiqui	2	1	3
5	DF	2	(Pakistan) Muhammad Shahid	2	0	2
5	MF	17	(Pakistan) Zaid Umar	2	0	2
5	MF	19	(Pakistan) Junaid Ahmed	2	0	2
8	DF	5	(Pakistan) Waqar Baloch	1	0	1
8	MF	7	(Pakistan) Zia Us-Salam	1	0	1
8	FW	16	(Pakistan) Danish Hameed	1	0	1
Own goals				3	0	3
Total				40	3	43

Last updated: 13 January 2019.
Source: KRL F.C.

=== Clean sheets ===
The list is sorted by shirt number when total clean sheets are equal.

Rnk	No.	Player	Premier League	National Challenge Cup	Total
1	1	(Pakistan) Tanveer Ahmed	14	0	14
2	24	(Pakistan) Hassan Riaz	0	1	1

Last updated: 13 January 2019.
Source: KRL F.C.

=== Summary ===
Games played	28 (26 Pakistan Premier League) (2 National Football Challenge Cup)
Games won	15 (14 Pakistan Premier League) (1 National Football Challenge Cup)
Games drawn	9 (9 Pakistan Premier League)
Games lost	4 (3 Pakistan Premier League) (1 National Football Challenge Cup)
Goals scored	43 (40 Pakistan Premier League) (3 National Football Challenge Cup)
Goals conceded	13 (12 Pakistan Premier League) (1 National Football Challenge Cup)
Goal difference	+30 (28 Pakistan Premier League) (2 National Football Challenge Cup)
Clean sheets	15 (14 Pakistan Premier League) (1 National Football Challenge Cup)
Yellow cards	32 (32 Pakistan Premier League)
Most appearances	(Pakistan) Izharullah (29 appearances)
Top scorer	(Pakistan) Iftikhar Ali Khan (12 goals)
Winning Percentage	Overall: 15/28 (53.5%)

Last updated: 13 January 2019.
Source: KRL F.C.
