= 2019–20 KRL F.C. season =

2019–20 season
- Owner: Khan Research Laboratories
- Chairman: Ayaz Butt
- Head coach: Aslam Khan
- Stadium: KRL Football Stadium
- National Challenge Cup: Third place
- Top goalscorer: League: All: Umair Ali (6)
Home colours	Away colours

The 2019–20 season is Khan Research Laboratories Football Club's 24th competitive season, 23rd consecutive season in the top flight of Pakistani football, 13th consecutive season in the Premier League, and 24th year in existence as a football club.

== Club ==
=== Coaching staff ===
Position	Staff
Manager	(Pakistan) Ayaz Butt
Assistant Manager	(Pakistan) Saeed Sr.
Head Coach	(Pakistan) Aslam Khan
Assistant Coach	(Pakistan) Kamran Khan
Local Coach	(Pakistan) Muhammad Shahid
Goalkeeper Coach	(Pakistan) Muhammad Zeeshan
Scout	(Pakistan) Abdul Ghaffar

Source: Global Sports Archive

=== Other information ===
Owner	(Pakistan) Khan Research Laboratories
Chairman	(Pakistan) Ayaz Butt

Source: Global Sports Archive

== First team squad ==
As of 19 July 2019.

Squad No.	Name	Nationality	Position(s)	Since	Date of birth (age)	Signed from	Games played	Goals scored
Goalkeepers
23	Nasrullah Khan	(Pakistan)	GK	2018	20 June 1998 (aged 21)	(Pakistan) Muslim	2	0
24	Hasan Riaz	(Pakistan)	GK	2018	2 September 1994 (aged 24)	(Pakistan) Higher Education Commission	0	0
Defenders
2	Muhammad Shahid (c)	(Pakistan)	RB	2010	10 November 1984 (aged 34)	(Pakistan) WAPDA	139	2
3	Arslan Ali	(Pakistan)	LB	2018	20 December 1998 (aged 20)	(Pakistan) Habib Bank	21	0
4	Muneer Ahmed	(Pakistan)	CB	2019	2 October 1990 (aged 28)	(Pakistan) Muslim	0	0
5	Waqar Baloch	(Pakistan)	CB	2018	28 November 1996 (aged 22)	(Pakistan) Sui Southern Gas	21	1
12	Abdul Qadeer	(Pakistan)	CB	2018	4 April 1999 (aged 20)	(Pakistan) WAPDA	9	0
14	Mazdaq Masood	(Pakistan)	CB	2018	23 January 1994 (aged 25)	(Pakistan) WAPDA	19	0
15	Imran Khan	(Pakistan)	CB	2018	7 January 1994 (aged 25)	Pakistan Airlines	26	3
18	Ghulam Fareed	(Pakistan)	RB / LB	2018	20 August 1991 (aged 27)	(Pakistan) WAPDA	14	0
25	Ali Agha	(Pakistan)	CB	2018	15 May 1997 (aged 22)	(Pakistan) Omid Hazara FC	6	0
Midfielders
10	Umair Ali	(Pakistan)	AM / LW	2018	9 September 1991 (aged 27)	(Pakistan) Sui Southern Gas	19	8
17	Zaid Umer	(Pakistan)	CM	2018	22 September 2001 (aged 17)	(Pakistan) Civil Aviation Authority	11	2
19	Junaid Ahmed	(Pakistan)	AM	2018	7 July 1999 (aged 20)	(Pakistan) Karachi Port Trust	22	2
22	Abdul Razzaq	(Pakistan)	RW / AM	2014	26 May 1998 (aged 21)	Academy	7	0
Strikers
6	Izharullah (vc)	(Pakistan)	CF	2014	3 November 1989 (aged 29)	Academy	41	7
8	Iftikhar Ali Khan	(Pakistan)	CF	2018	1 February 1992 (aged 27)	(Pakistan) WAPDA	25	12
9	Zeeshan Siddiqui	(Pakistan)	CF	2018	25 December 1993 (aged 25)	Academy	7	2
13	Hafiz Shah Wali	(Pakistan)	CF	2018	10 August 1990 (aged 28)	(Pakistan) Muslim	20	0

== Season ==
=== National Challenge Cup ===
Khan Research Laboratories started their season with 3–0 win over Karachi United. On 24 July, they defeated Karachi Port Trust 5–0 and three days later drew 0–0 with WAPDA to top their group.

==== Table ====
Pos	Team	Pld	W	D	L	GF	GA	GD	Pts	Qualification
1	Khan Research Laboratories	3	2	1	0	8	0	+8	7	Advance to Knockout round
2	WAPDA	3	2	1	0	5	0	+5	7	Advance to Knockout round
3	Karachi Port Trust	3	1	0	2	1	8	−7	3	
4	Karachi United	3	0	0	3	0	6	−6	0	

Updated to match(es) played on 24 July 2019. Source: GSA

==== Matches ====
20 July 2019 Group Stage	Khan Research Laboratories	3–0	Karachi United	Peshawar
20:00 PST	Izharullah 29'; Iftikhar A. Khan 41'; Ali Agha (yellow card) 75'; Arslan Ali (yellow card) 83'; Umair Ali 90+1'	Report		Stadium: Tehmas Khan Football Stadium

24 July 2019 Group Stage	Khan Research Laboratories	5–0	Karachi Port Trust	Peshawar
20:00 PST	Arslan Ali 17'; Izharullah 29'; Iftikhar A. Khan 39'; Imran Khan 65'; Umair Ali 83'	Report		Stadium: Tehmas Khan Football Stadium

27 July 2019 Group Stage	Khan Research Laboratories	0–0	WAPDA	Peshawar
17:00 PST	Muneer Ahmed (yellow card) 52'; Hafiz Shah (yellow card) 52'	Report	Zain-ul-Abdeen (yellow card) 47'; M. Ahmed 50'	Stadium: Tehmas Khan Football Stadium

31 July 2019 Quarter-finals	Pakistan Police	6–1	Khan Research Laboratories	Peshawar
17:00 PST	Umair Ali 1', 44', 87'; Zaid Umer 53'; Imran Khan 59'; Zeeshan Siddiqui 80'	Report	M. Yousaf 40'	Stadium: Tehmas Khan Football Stadium

2 August 2019 Semi-finals	Khan Research Laboratories	0–0 (a.e.t.) (1–3 p)	Pakistan Army	Peshawar
18:00 PST		Report		Stadium: Tehmas Khan Football Stadium
	Penalties
	Umair Ali (penalty scored); Iftikhar A. Khan (penalty missed); Shahid (penalty missed); Ghulam Fareed (penalty missed)		(penalty scored) Nisar Ahmed; (penalty scored) Najeeb-ur-Rehman; (penalty scored) M. Jamil

3 August 2019 Third place	WAPDA	0–1	Khan Research Laboratories	Peshawar
21:00 PST		Report	Umair Ali 90'	Stadium: Tehmas Khan Football Stadium

=== Summary ===
Competition	P	W	D	L	GF	GA	CS	Booked	(yellow card) (yellow-red card)	Sent off (straight red)
National Challenge Cup	6	4	2	0	15	1	5	5	0	0
Total	6	4	2	0	15	1	5	5	0	0

== Statistics ==
=== Appearances ===
No.	Pos.	Name	Premier League		National Challenge Cup		Total		Discipline	
No.	Pos.	Name	Apps	Goals	Apps	Goals	Apps	Goals	Yellow card	Red card
2	DF	(Pakistan) Muhammad Shahid	0	0	4	0	4	0	0	0
3	DF	(Pakistan) Arslan Ali	0	0	4	1	4	1	1	0
4	DF	(Pakistan) Muneer Ahmed	0	0	5	0	5	0	1	0
5	DF	(Pakistan) Waqar Baloch	0	0	4	0	4	0	0	0
6	FW	(Pakistan) Izharullah	0	0	4 (1)	2	4 (1)	2	0	0
8	FW	(Pakistan) Iftikhar Ali Khan	0	0	3 (1)	2	3 (1)	2	0	0
9	FW	(Pakistan) Zeeshan Siddiqui	0	0	2 (2)	1	2 (2)	1	0	0
10	FW	(Pakistan) Umair Ali	0	0	5	6	5	6	0	0
12	DF	(Pakistan) Abdul Qadeer	0	0	4 (1)	0	4 (1)	0	1	0
13	FW	(Pakistan) Hafiz Wali Shah	0	0	1 (2)	0	1 (2)	0	1	0
14	DF	(Pakistan) Mazdaq Maqsood	0	0	1 (1)	0	1 (1)	0	0	0
15	DF	(Pakistan) Imran Khan	0	0	5	2	5	2	0	0
17	MF	(Pakistan) Zaid Umar	0	0	5	1	5	1	0	0
18	DF	(Pakistan) Ghulam Fareed	0	0	1	0	1	0	0	0
19	MF	(Pakistan) Junaid Ahmed	0	0	2 (1)	0	2 (1)	0	0	0
22	MF	(Pakistan) Abdul Razzaq	0	0	0 (1)	0	0 (1)	0	0	0
23	GK	(Pakistan) Nasrullah	0	0	5	0	5	0	0	0
24	GK	(Pakistan) Hassan Riaz	0	0	0	0	0	0	0	0
25	DF	(Pakistan) Ali Agha	0	0	0 (1)	0	0 (1)	0	1	0

Last updated: 3 August 2019.
Source: KRL F.C.

=== Top scorers ===
The list is sorted by shirt number when total goals are equal.

Rnk	Pos	No.	Player	Premier League	National Challenge Cup	Total
1	MF	10	(Pakistan) Umair Ali	0	6	6
2	FW	6	(Pakistan) Izharullah Khan	0	2	2
2	FW	8	(Pakistan) Iftikhar Ali Khan	0	2	2
2	DF	15	(Pakistan) Imran Khan	0	2	2
4	DF	3	(Pakistan) Arslan Ali	0	1	1
4	FW	9	(Pakistan) Zeeshan Siddiqui	0	1	1
4	MF	17	(Pakistan) Zaid Umer	0	1	1
Own goals				0	0	0
Total				0	15	15

Last updated: 3 August 2019.
Source: KRL F.C.

=== Clean sheets ===
The list is sorted by shirt number when total clean sheets are equal.

Rnk	No.	Player	Premier League	National Challenge Cup	Total
1	23	(Pakistan) Nasrullah	0	5	5

Last updated: 3 August 2019.
Source: KRL F.C.
