= Yasir Afridi =

Pakistani footballer

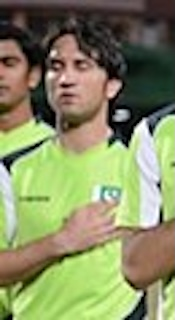
- Afridi with Pakistan in 2013

Personal information
- Birth name: Yasir Afridi
- Date of birth: 27 July 1988 (age 38)
- Place of birth: Landi Kotal, Pakistan
- Height: 1.75 m (5 ft 9 in)
- Position: Midfielder

Team information
- Current team: Mehran

Senior career*
Years	Team	Apps	(Gls)
2007–2021	Khan Research Laboratories	87	(23)
2021–2022	Muslim FC		
2023	BHCC		
2023–	Mehran		

International career^{‡}
2010–2011	Pakistan U23	3	(0)
2013	Pakistan	7	(0)
- * Club domestic league appearances and goals as of January 13, 2019 ‡ National team caps and goals as of June 11, 2019

Yasir Afridi (born 27 July 1988) is a Pakistani footballer who plays as a midfielder for Mehran.

Khan has been with Khan Research Laboratories where he won three Pakistan Premier League titles and four National Football Challenge Cup tournaments. Initially called up to the Pakistan national football team for the 2005 South Asian Football Federation Gold Cup, he also competed at the 2010 Asian Games with the Pakistan national under-23 football team.

== Early and personal life ==
Afridi was born on 27 July 1988 in Landi Kotal, Khyber Pakhtunkhwa. Afridi is a cousin of Shaheen Afridi and Riaz Afridi, both of whom represent the Pakistan national cricket team.

== Club career ==
=== Khan Research Laboratories ===
Afridi made his debut with Khan Research Laboratories in the 2007–08 Pakistan Premier League. On 15 January 2008, he scored a hat-trick in a 3–0 win against Afghan Chaman, opening the scoring for KRL in the 58th minute and adding two more in the 78th and 80th minutes after a scoreless first half at the KRL Stadium, Rawalpindi. He won the Pakistan Premier League title with the side in 2011–12, 2012–13, and 2013–14. He also won the National Football Challenge Cup with the club in the 2011, 2012, 2015, and 2016 editions.

Afridi also participated in the AFC President's Cup from 2012 to 2014. He was a member of the team which reached the 2013 AFC President's Cup final, after falling to Turkmen club Balkan FT by 0–1 in the final.

During the 2018–19 season, Afridi was part for the 2018 National Challenge Cup, although he was an unused substitute in the only match he was selected and was not included in the 2018–19 Pakistan Premier League squad, which was won by Khan Research Laboratories.

=== Muslim FC ===
Afridi moved to Chaman club Muslim FC in 2021.

=== BHCC ===
In early 2023, Afridi played in the 2023 PFF National Challenge Cup held in the year with departmental side BHCC. He scored the equaliser goal in the 74th minute against POPO FC which competed under the name of department Mamsons Builders.

=== Mehran ===
Afridi subsequently moved to Islamabad club Mehran FC in May 2023.

== International career ==
In August 2005, Afridi was included in the national youth camp for the selection of Pakistan under-20 team for the 2006 AFC Youth Championship qualification.

Afridi was first called by the Pakistan national team during the 2005 South Asian Football Federation Gold Cup.

In 2007, he was included in the national camp for the selection of Pakistan under-23 team for the 2008 Summer Olympics qualifiers. Afridi participated with the Pakistan national under-23 football team in 2010 Asian Games. On 7 November 2010, Afridi made his debut in the campaign against Thailand U23. Afridi was booked a yellow card against Oman U23 on the 63rd minute.

Mired by injuries in 2012, he was called again by the senior team in February 2013, making two appearances in both two-match friendlies against Nepal, both ending in a 1–0 victory for Pakistan. He them played in a two-match tour against Maldives in the same month, receiving an injury to his face which saw the play halt for few minutes. He was criticised by the end of the campaign. In March 2013, he participated in the 2014 AFC Challenge Cup qualification, playing against Tajikistan and Kyrgyzstan. He played his last international match on 20 August 2013 against Afghanistan. He remained as unused substitute in the 2013 SAFF Championship.

== Career statistics ==
=== Club ===
As of 13 January 2019

Club	Season	League			Cup (Note: Includes National Football Challenge Cup)		Asia (Note: Includes AFC President's Cup)		Total	
Club	Season	Division	Apps	Goals	Apps	Goals	Apps	Goals	Apps	Goals
Khan Research Laboratories	2014–15	Pakistan Premier League	12	2	3	0	—		15	2
Khan Research Laboratories	2011–12	Pakistan Premier League	23	6	5	0	4	0	32	6
Khan Research Laboratories	2012–13	Pakistan Premier League	16	5	1	0	2	0	30	5
Khan Research Laboratories	2013–14	Pakistan Premier League	26	9	2	0	3	1	31	10
Khan Research Laboratories	2014–15	Pakistan Premier League	10	1	3	0	—		13	1
Khan Research Laboratories	2015–16	Pakistan Premier League	—		6	1	—		6	1
Khan Research Laboratories	2018–19	Pakistan Premier League	—		0	0	—		0	0
Khan Research Laboratories	Total		87	23	20	1	9	1	116	25
Career Totals			87	23	20	1	9	1	116	25

=== International ===
Appearances and goals by year and competition
National team	Year	Apps	Goals
Pakistan	2013	7	0
Total		7	0

== Honours ==
=== Khan Research Laboratories ===
- Pakistan Premier League: 2011–12, 2012–13, 2013–14
- National Football Challenge Cup: 2011, 2012, 2015, 2016
