= Zia Us-Salam =

Pakistani footballer

Personal information
- Full name: Zia Us-Salam
- Date of birth: February 4, 1990 (age 36)
- Place of birth: Chitral, Pakistan
- Position: Midfielder

Team information
- Current team: Khan Research Laboratories
- Number: 7

Senior career*
Years	Team	Apps	(Gls)
2008–	Khan Research Laboratories	117	(10)

International career^{‡}
2011–2012	Pakistan U23		
2012–2013	Pakistan	4	(0)
- * Club domestic league appearances and goals as of 13 January 2019 ‡ National team caps and goals as of 9 October 2013

Zia Us-Salam (born 4 February 1990) is a Pakistani footballer who plays as a midfielder for Khan Research Laboratories, where he is the captain.

== Club career ==
Zia started his career with departmental side Khan Research Laboratories in 2008. He won four league titles and five National Challenge Cup with the club.

He also participated in the AFC President's Cup from 2012 to 2014. He was a member of the team which reached the 2013 AFC President's Cup final, after falling to Turkmen club Balkan FT by 0–1 in the final.

In December 2021, Zia played with DFA Chitral, winning the 2021 Khyber Pakhtunkhwa Football Cup after winning in the final against Muslim FC.

== International career ==
Following a football camp that was held in 2011 in Chitral, Zia-us-Salam was selected to play for Pakistan's national football team. In January 2011, he was included in the probable list for the 2012 Summer Olympics qualifiers. He also participated in the 2012 H.E. Mahinda Rajapaksa Under-23 International Football Trophy with the Pakistan national under-23 team.

Zia made his international debut on 19 November 2012 in a friendly match against Singapore in a 4–0 loss. He made his competitive debut in 2013 SAFF Championship against Nepal in a 1–1 draw, coming on as a 72nd minute substitute for Muhammad Riaz. He played his first full international against Bangladesh in the competition, as Pakistan won the match 1–2. Zia has not made an appearance for national team since.

== Career statistics ==
=== Club ===
As of match played 13 January 2019

Appearances and goals by club, season and competition
Club	Season	League			Cup		Asia		Total	
Club	Season	Division	Apps	Goals	Apps	Goals	Apps	Goals	Apps	Goals
Khan Research Laboratories	2010–11	Pakistan Premier League	14	0	6	0	–	–	20	0
Khan Research Laboratories	2011–12	Pakistan Premier League	21	2	6	0	1	0	28	2
Khan Research Laboratories	2012–13	Pakistan Premier League	27	5	4	0	6	1	37	6
Khan Research Laboratories	2013–14	Pakistan Premier League	25	2	2	0	3	0	29	2
Khan Research Laboratories	2014–15	Pakistan Premier League	4	0	5	0	–	–	9	0
Khan Research Laboratories	2015–16	Pakistan Premier League	–	–	4	0	–	–	4	0
Khan Research Laboratories	2018–19	Pakistan Premier League	26	1	1	0	–	–	27	1
Khan Research Laboratories	Total		117	10	28	0	10	1	155	11
Career total			117	10	28	0	10	1	155	11

=== International ===
Appearances and goals by national team and year
National team	Year	Apps	Goals
Pakistan	2012	1	0
Pakistan	2013	3	0
Total		4	0

== Honours ==
=== Club ===
Khan Research Laboratories

- Pakistan Premier League: 2011–12, 2012–13, 2013–14, 2018–19
- National Football Challenge Cup: 2010, 2011, 2012, 2015, 2016
