= 2025 Lahore Qalandars season =

2025 season of Lahore Qalandars

Lahore Qalandars
2025 season
- Coach: Aqib Javed
- Captain: Shaheen Afridi
- Ground(s): Gaddafi Stadium
- PSL 2025: Champions
- Most runs: Fakhar Zaman (439)
- Most wickets: Shaheen Afridi (19)

Lahore Qalandars competed in the 2025 Pakistan Super League (PSL 2025) under captain Shaheen Afridi. They secured their third title in four seasons, tying Islamabad United for the most PSL championships. Fakhar Zaman was the team's top scorer with 439 runs, and Afridi led the bowling attack with 19 wickets.

== Season summary ==
Lahore Qalandars began PSL 2025 with a defeat to Islamabad United, but quickly bounced back with strong victories over Quetta Gladiators and Karachi Kings. Despite the absence of overseas players like Daryl Mitchell and Sam Billings, they secured a top-four finish, largely driven by performances from Fakhar Zaman and Abdullah Shafique.

In the Eliminator, Lahore chased 191/4 in 18.4 overs to beat Karachi Kings, with Shafique playing a pivotal knock. They followed that by defeating Islamabad United by 95 runs in Qualifier 2 to reach the final.

On 25 May 2025 at Gaddafi Stadium, Lahore chased down 202/4 in 19.5 overs to defeat Quetta Gladiators by 6 wickets. Kusal Perera starred with 62* and captain Shaheen Afridi took 3/32 in what proved a tightly contested final. The win secured Lahore’s third PSL title in four years and capped a season of strong comebacks and clutch performances.

== Season standings ==
=== Points table ===
Pos	Team	Pld	W	L	NR	Pts	NRR	Qualification
1	Quetta Gladiators (RU)	10	7	2	1	15	1.393	Advance to Qualifier
2	Islamabad United (3rd)	10	6	4	0	12	0.372	Advance to Qualifier
3	Karachi Kings (4th)	10	6	4	0	12	0.049	Advance to Eliminator 1
4	Lahore Qalandars (C)	10	5	4	1	11	1.036	Advance to Eliminator 1
5	Peshawar Zalmi	10	4	6	0	8	−0.293	
6	Multan Sultans	10	1	9	0	2	−2.449	

Source: ESPNcricinfo

== Statistics ==
=== Most runs ===
Fakhar Zaman led Lahore's batting in 2025, scoring 439 runs at 33.76 average and strike rate 152.96.

=== Most wickets ===
Shaheen Shah Afridi was Lahore's top wicket-taker, claiming 19 wickets in the 2025 season.

== Results ==
=== Group stage ===
Match 1
11 April 2025
20:30 (N)
Scorecard

Lahore Qalandars; 139 (19.2 overs)	v	Islamabad United (H); 143/2 (17.4 overs)
Abdullah Shafique 66 (38); Jason Holder 4/26 (4 overs)		Colin Munro 59 (42); Asif Afridi 1/15 (4 overs)

Islamabad United won by 8 wickets
Rawalpindi Cricket Stadium, Rawalpindi
Umpires: Chris Brown (NZ) and Ahsan Raza (Pak)
Player of the match: Jason Holder (Islamabad United)

- Islamabad United won the toss and elected to field.
- Muhammad Naeem (Lahore Qalandars) made his T20 debut.

Match 4
13 April 2025
20:00 (N)
Scorecard

Lahore Qalandars; 219/6 (20 overs)	v	Quetta Gladiators; 140 (16.2 overs)
Fakhar Zaman 67 (39); Abrar Ahmed 2/33 (4 overs)		Rilee Rossouw 44 (19); Rishad Hossain 3/31 (4 overs)

Lahore Qalandars won by 79 runs
Rawalpindi Cricket Stadium, Rawalpindi
Umpires: Chris Brown (NZ) and Ahsan Raza (Pak)
Player of the match: Fakhar Zaman (Lahore Qalandars)

- Quetta Gladiators won the toss and elected to field.
