= 2015 National Challenge Cup =

National Bank Football Challenge Cup

Tournament details
- Country: Pakistan
- City: Lahore
- Venue(s): Railway Stadium; Model Town Football Academy Ground; Shah Faisal Sports Ground
- Dates: 15 April 2015 – 28 April 2015
- Teams: 16

Final positions
- Champions: Khan Research Laboratories (5th title)
- Runners-up: Pakistan International Airlines
- Third place: Pakistan Army
- Fourth place: WAPDA

Tournament statistics
- Matches played: 32
- Goals scored: 92 (2.88 per match)
- Top goal scorer: Muhammad Mujahid (4 goals)
- All statistics correct as of 28 April 2015.

2015 National Challenge Cup was the 25th edition of the National Challenge Cup, the main domestic cup in Pakistani football. The tournament was held in Lahore, from 15 to 28 April 2015. The season was called NBP National Challenge Cup as it was sponsored by National Bank of Pakistan.

== Teams ==
The 16 participating teams are as below:

- Pakistan Airforce^{TH,}
- K-Electric^{PPL}
- Khan Research Laboratories
- Pakistan Army
- WAPDA
- Karachi Port Trust
- Pakistan Airlines
- Pakistan Navy
- National Bank
- Habib Bank
- Pakistan Railways
- Sui Northern Gas
- Sui Southern Gas
- Ashraf Sugar Mills
- Saif Textiles Mills
- Higher Education Commission

Notes
TH = Challenge Cup title holders; PPL = Pakistan Premier League winners; H = Host

== Group stages ==
=== Group A ===
Pos	Team	Pld	W	D	L	GF	GA	GD	Pts	Qualification
1	Pakistan Airlines	3	2	0	1	3	2	+1	6	Advance to Knockout round
2	National Bank	3	2	0	1	3	4	−1	6	Advance to Knockout round
3	Higher Education Commission	3	1	1	1	4	2	+2	4	
4	Saif Textiles Mills	3	0	1	2	1	3	−2	1	

Updated to match(es) played on 22 April 2015. Source: GSA
15 April 2015
15:30 (UTC+5)

National Bank	0–3	Higher Education Commission
	Report	Awais Riasat 44', 52'; Ali Raza 58' (pen.)

Model Town Football Academy Ground, Lahore
Attendance: 50
15 April 2015
16:00 (UTC+5)

Pakistan Airlines	1–0	Saif Textiles Mills
Habib-ur-Rehman 75'	Report

Railway Stadium, Lahore
Attendance: 150

17 April 2015
16:00 (UTC+5)

Pakistan Airlines	2-1	Higher Education Commission
A. Jabbar 40'; Lashari 76'	Report	Waseem 90'

Shah Faisal Sports Ground, Lahore
Attendance: 400
18 April 2011
16:00 (UTC+5)

National Bank	2–1	Saif Textiles Mills
Maqbool 45+1'; Akmal Shahzad 90+4'	Report	Mustafa 57'

Railway Stadium, Lahore
Attendance: 250

20 April 2015
15:30 (UTC+5)

Higher Education Commission	0–0	Saif Textiles Mills
	Report

Model Town Football Academy Ground, Lahore
Attendance: 150
20 April 2015
16:00 (UTC+5)

Pakistan Airlines	0–1	National Bank
	Report	Sher Mohammad 72'

Shah Faisal Sports Ground, Lahore
Attendance: 200

=== Group B ===
Pos	Team	Pld	W	D	L	GF	GA	GD	Pts	Qualification
1	Pakistan Navy	3	1	2	0	5	3	+2	5	Advance to Knockout round
2	Pakistan Army	3	1	2	0	3	2	+1	5	Advance to Knockout round
3	Ashraf Sugar Mills	3	1	1	1	2	3	−1	4	
4	Karachi Port Trust	3	0	1	2	2	4	−2	1	

Updated to match(es) played on 22 April 2015. Source: GSA
16 April 2015
15:30 (UTC+5)

Karachi Port Trust	1–1	Pakistan Navy
Waseem 24'	Report	Mohsin Ali 84'

Model Town Football Academy Ground, Lahore
Attendance: 100
16 April 2015
16:00 (UTC+5)

Pakistan Army	0–0	Ashraf Sugar Mills
	Report

Shah Faisal Sports Ground, Lahore
Attendance: 300

19 April 2015
15:30 (UTC+5)

Karachi Port Trust	0–1	Ashraf Sugar Mills
	Report	M. Imran Jr. 80'

Model Town Football Academy Ground, Lahore
Attendance: 150
19 April 2011
16:00 (UTC+5)

Pakistan Army	1–1	Pakistan Navy
Ansar Abbas 70'	Report	Naveed 73'

Railway Stadium, Lahore
Attendance: 150

21 April 2015
16:00 (UTC+5)

Pakistan Navy	3–1	Ashraf Sugar Mills
Hafiz Hassan 62'; Farhan 72', 90'	Report	Azeem Abbas 88'

Shah Faisal Sports Ground, Lahore
Attendance: 300
22 April 2015
16:00 (UTC+5)

Pakistan Army	2–1	Karachi Port Trust
Ansar Abbas 4'; Masror Ahmed 89' (pen.)	Report	Zahid Ahmed 29' (pen.)

Railway Stadium, Lahore
Attendance: 100

=== Group C ===
Pos	Team	Pld	W	D	L	GF	GA	GD	Pts	Qualification
1	Pakistan Airforce	3	2	0	1	6	1	+5	6	Advance to Knockout round
2	Habib Bank	3	2	0	1	6	4	+2	6	Advance to Knockout round
3	WAPDA	3	2	0	1	4	2	+2	6	
4	Pakistan Railways	3	0	0	3	1	10	−9	0	

Updated to match(es) played on 22 April 2015. Source: GSA
17 April 2015
15:30 (UTC+5)

WAPDA	1–0	Pakistan Railways
Waseem Abbas 81'	Report

Model Town Football Academy Ground, Lahore
Attendance: 200
17 April 2015
16:00 (UTC+5)

Pakistan Airforce	0–1	Habib Bank
	Report	Saeed 58'

Railway Stadium, Lahore
Attendance: 100

19 April 2015
16:00 (UTC+5)

Pakistan Airforce	4–0	Pakistan Railways
M. Sohail 6'; M. Mujahid 20', 35', 56'	Report

Shah Faisal Sports Ground, Lahore
Attendance: 300
20 April 2011
16:00 (UTC+5)

WAPDA	3–0	Habib Bank
Waseem Abbas 52', 75'; Ahsan Ali 90+2'	Report

Railway Stadium, Lahore
Attendance: 200

22 April 2015
15:30 (UTC+5)

Pakistan Airforce	2–0	WAPDA
M. Mujahid 14'; Mansoor 32'	Report

Model Town Football Academy Ground, Lahore
Attendance: 150
22 April 2015
16:00 (UTC+5)

Pakistan Railways	1–5	Habib Bank
Usman 6'	Report	Saeed 14', 45+1'; Atif Fateh 64'; Khayal Muhammad 68' (pen.); Noman 75'

Shah Faisal Sports Ground, Lahore
Attendance: 300

=== Group D ===
Pos	Team	Pld	W	D	L	GF	GA	GD	Pts	Qualification
1	Khan Research Laboratories	3	2	1	0	3	1	+2	7	Advance to Knockout round
2	K-Electric	3	1	2	0	3	1	+2	5	Advance to Knockout round
3	Sui Southern Gas	3	1	1	1	7	4	+3	4	
4	Sui Northern Gas	3	0	0	3	3	11	−8	0	

Updated to match(es) played on 22 April 2015. Source: GSA
15 April 2015
16:00 (UTC+5)

K-Electric	3–1	Sui Northern Gas
Rasool 22', 72'; Essa 45+1'	Report	Ahmed Faheem 86'

Shah Faisal Sports Ground, Lahore
Attendance: 200
16 April 2015
16:00 (UTC+5)

Khan Research Laboratories	2–1	Sui Southern Gas
Murtuza Hussain 61' (pen.); A. Samad 90'	Report	Zakir Lashari 13'

Railway Stadium, Lahore
Attendance: 300

18 April 2015
15:30 (UTC+5)

K-Electric	0–0	Sui Southern Gas
	Report

Model Town Football Academy Ground, Lahore
Attendance: 130
18 April 2015
16:00 (UTC+5)

Khan Research Laboratories	1–0	Sui Northern Gas
M. Naveed 87'	Report

Shah Faisal Sports Ground, Lahore
Attendance: 400

21 April 2015
15:30 (UTC+5)

Khan Research Laboratories	0–0	K-Electric
	Report

Model Town Football Academy Ground, Lahore
Attendance: 150
21 April 2015
16:00 (UTC+5)

Sui Southern Gas	6–2	Sui Northern Gas
Saeed 4'; Bilawal-ur-Rehman 17' (pen.); Hameed Khan 24'; M. Lal 54', 79'; Umair Ali 60'	Report	Sada Bahar 57'; Ahmed Faheem 88' (pen.)

Railway Stadium, Lahore
Attendance: 30

== Knockout round ==
=== Quarter finals ===
23 April 2015
16:00 (UTC+5)

Khan Research Laboratories	1–0	National Bank
Murtuza Hussain 20'	Report

Shah Faisal Sports Ground, Lahore
Attendance: 150
23 April 2015
16:00 (UTC+5)

Pakistan Airlines	3-1	K-Electric
Nasrullah 79' (pen.); Zeeshan Ali 93'; Imran Khan 106'	Report	Rasool 36'

Railway Stadium, Lahore
Attendance: 150

24 April 2015
16:00 (UTC+5)

Pakistan Airforce	0–2	Pakistan Army
	Report	Zahid Naveed 20', 86'

Model Town Football Academy Ground, Lahore
Attendance: 200
24 April 2015
16:00 (UTC+5)

Pakistan Navy	1–2	WAPDA
Hafiz Hassan 3'	Report	Ahsan Ali 31'; Hassnain 70'

Railway Stadium, Lahore
Attendance: 200

=== Semi-finals ===
26 April 2015
15:45 (UTC+5)

Khan Research Laboratories	1–0	Pakistan Army
Murtuza Hussain 23'	Report

Shah Faisal Sports Ground, Lahore
Attendance: 250
Referee: Shahid Hussain
26 April 2015
15:45 (UTC+5)

Pakistan Airlines	1–1 (a.e.t.)	WAPDA
Riaz Ahmed 62'	Report	A. Razzaq 81'
Penalties
Lashari (penalty scored); Riaz Ahmed (penalty scored); A. Jabbar (penalty scored); Habib-ur-Rehman (penalty scored); A. Ghaffar (penalty scored)	5–4	(penalty scored) Waseem Abbas; (penalty scored) Ahsan Ali; (penalty scored) Hassnain; (penalty scored) S. Aun Raza; (penalty missed) M. Noman

Railway Stadium, Lahore
Attendance: 250
Referee: Irshad-ul-Haq

=== Third place ===
24 April 2015
16:00 (UTC+5)

Pakistan Army	0–0 (a.e.t.)	WAPDA
	Report
Penalties
Ansar Abbas (penalty scored); Shahid Zameer (penalty scored); M. Yasir (penalty scored); Farmanullah (penalty scored); Zahid Naveed (penalty scored)	5–4	(penalty scored) Waseem Abbas; (penalty scored) M. Bilal; (penalty scored) Hassnain; (penalty scored) Naeemullah; (penalty missed) M. Touseef

Railway Stadium, Lahore
Attendance: 150
Referee: Shahid Hussain

=== Final ===
28 April 2015
15:00 (UTC+5)

Pakistan Airlines	0–3	Khan Research Laboratories
	Report	M. Dawood 3'; Izharullah 50', 54'

Railway Stadium, Lahore
Attendance: 500
Referee: Irshad-ul-Haq

== Top scorers ==
As of 28 April 2015

Rank	Scorer	Club	Goals
1	Muhammad Mujahid	Pakistan Airforce	4
2	Murtuza Hussain	Khan Research Laboratories	3
2	Muhammad Rasool	K-Electric	3
2	Waseem Abbas	WAPDA	3
2	Saeed	Habib Bank	3
