= Riaz Afridi =

Pakistani cricket coach and cricketer

Personal information
- Born: 21 January 1985 (age 41); Peshawar, Khyber Pakhtunkhwa, Pakistan
- Batting: Right-handed
- Bowling: Right-arm medium-fast
- Relatives: Shaheen Afridi (younger brother); Yasir Afridi (cousin)

International information
- National side: Pakistan (2004)
- Only Test (cap 182): 28 October 2004 v Sri Lanka

Career statistics
Competition	Test	First-class
Matches	1	42
Runs scored	9	580
Batting average	9.00	13.18
100s/50s	0/0	0/2
Top score	9	66
Balls bowled	186	7902
Wickets	2	182
Bowling average	43.50	23.28
5 wickets in innings	0	10
10 wickets in match	0	1
Best bowling	2/42	7/78
Catches/stumpings	0/–	8/–
- Source: ESPNcricinfo, 11 June 2017

Riaz Afridi (Urdu: ریاض آفریدی; born 21 January 1985) is a Pakistani Cricket Coach and Former Cricketer. He is the elder brother of Pakistani fast bowler Shaheen Shah Afridi. Currently he is part of Lahore Qalandars coaching team.

He was a right-handed batsman and a right-arm medium-fast bowler. In December 2017, his youngest brother Shaheen Afridi was named in Pakistan's squad for the 2018 Under-19 Cricket World Cup.

Afridi has played one Test match, for the Pakistan national cricket team against the Sri Lanka national cricket team. It was the same match which saw Naved-ul-Hasan make his Test debut.

Riaz is a cousin of Pakistani footballer Yasir Afridi. In 2007 Riaz signed a contract with the Indian Cricket League (ICL) and represented the Lahore Badshahs, which put Riaz's future as a Pakistani Test player at risk.

During the summer months Riaz played club cricket in the north east of England for Great Ayton CC, he was a key player as the club won the North Yorkshire and South Durham Cricket League for the first time in its history. The following season he achieved the feat of 100 wickets in a league season.
