= 2011 National Challenge Cup =

National Bank Football Cup

Tournament details
- Country: Pakistan
- Venue(s): Bohranwali Ground, Faisalabad
- Dates: 14 April 2011 – 27 April 2011
- Teams: 16

Final positions
- Champions: Khan Research Laboratories (3rd title)
- Runners-up: K-Electric

Tournament statistics
- Matches played: 32
- Goals scored: 92 (2.88 per match)
- Top goal scorer: Muhammad Rasool (5 goals)

Awards
- Best player: Hassnain Abbas (Khan Research Laboratories)
- All statistics correct as of 27 April 2011.

2011 National Challenge Cup was the 21st season of National Challenge Cup, the main domestic cup in Pakistani football. Hosted by PMC Athletico, the tournament was held from 14 to 27 April 2011.

== Teams ==
The 16 teams participating in the tournament were as below:

=== Teams ===
(TH: Challenge Cup title holders; PPL: Pakistan Premier League winners)

Teams for 2011 National Challenge Cup Group stage
Khan Research Laboratories^{TH}	WAPDA^{PPL}	PMC Athletico (H)	Pakistan Army
Karachi Port Trust	Pakistan Airlines	Pakistan Navy	Karachi Electric Supply Corporation
Habib Bank	National Bank	Pakistan Airforce	Pakistan Television
Pakistan Railways	Zarai Taraqiati	Ashraf Sugar Mills	Pakistan Police

== Group stages ==
=== Group A ===
Pos	Team	Pld	W	D	L	GF	GA	GD	Pts	Qualification
1	Ashraf Sugar Mills	3	2	0	1	3	1	+2	6	Advance to Knockout round
2	WAPDA	3	1	1	1	3	3	0	4	Advance to Knockout round
3	Pakistan Navy	3	1	1	1	3	3	0	4	
4	National Bank	3	1	0	2	3	5	−2	3	

Updated to match(es) played on 21 April 2011. Source:
16 April 2011
16:00 (UTC+5)

National Bank	2-1	Pakistan Navy
Ashfaq 33'; Waheed Hameed 64'		Asif Bakhsh 57'

Bohranwali Stadium, Faisalabad
16 April 2011
16:00 (UTC+5)

WAPDA	0-1	Ashraf Sugar Mills
		Nisar 87'

PMC Ground, Faisalabad
18 April 2011
16:00 (UTC+5)

WAPDA	2-1	National Bank
Shahid Baloch 5'; Ayaz Baloch 54'		Misbah 90+3'

Bohranwali Stadium, Faisalabad
Referee: Ahmed Ali
18 April 2011
16:00 (UTC+5)

Pakistan Navy	1-0	Ashraf Sugar Mills
Asif Bakhsh 45+1'

PMC Ground, Faisalabad
Referee: Naveed Bashir Butt
21 April 2011
16:00 (UTC+5)

National Bank	0-2	Ashraf Sugar Mills
		Zainul Abedia 3'; Saeed Khan 82'

Bohranwali Stadium, Faisalabad
21 April 2011
16:00 (UTC+5)

Pakistan Navy	1-1	WAPDA
Shahid Munir 90'		Yasir 4'

PMC Ground, Faisalabad

=== Group B ===
Pos	Team	Pld	W	D	L	GF	GA	GD	Pts	Qualification
1	Khan Research Laboratories	3	3	0	0	9	0	+9	9	Advance to Knockout round
2	Pakistan Airforce	3	2	0	1	5	3	+2	6	Advance to Knockout round
3	Zarai Taraqiati	3	1	0	2	1	6	−5	3	
4	Habib Bank	3	0	0	3	0	6	−6	0	

Updated to match(es) played on 21 April 2011. Source:
14 April 2011
16:00 (UTC+5)

Pakistan Airforce	3-0	Habib Bank
Muhammad Arif 24'; Amir Khan 30'; Irfan Ali 36'

Bohranwali Stadium, Faisalabad
15 April 2011
16:00 (UTC+5)

Karachi Research Laboratories	4-0	Zarai Taraqiati
Asim Mansoor 20'; Asif 84', 89'; Mehmood Khan 87'

Bohranwali Ground, Faisalabad
17 April 2011
16:00 (UTC+5)

Habib Bank	0-2	Khan Research Laboratories
		Asif 50'; Ishaq 73'

PMC Ground
Referee: Ahmed Ali
17 April 2011
16:00 (UTC+5)

Pakistan Airforce	2-0	Zarai Taraqiati
Irfan 45'; Amir 61'

PMC Ground
Referee: Naveed Bashir Butt
19 April 2011
16:00 (UTC+5)

Khan Research Laboratories	3-0	Pakistan Airforce
Qasim 25'; Saadullah 67'; Kaleemullah 89'

PMC Ground
Referee: Naveed Bashir Butt
17 April 2011
16:00 (UTC+5)

Habib Bank	0-1	ZTBL
		Iftikhar Ali 68'

PMC Ground
Referee: Naveed Bashir Butt

=== Group C ===
Pos	Team	Pld	W	D	L	GF	GA	GD	Pts	Qualification
1	Pakistan Airlines	3	3	0	0	5	1	+4	9	Advance to Knockout round
2	Karachi Port Trust	3	2	0	1	2	2	0	6	Advance to Knockout round
3	Pakistan Police	3	0	1	2	4	6	−2	1	
4	Pakistan Television	3	0	1	2	3	5	−2	1	

Updated to match(es) played on 21 April 2011. Source:
15 April 2011
16:00 (UTC+5)

Karachi Port Trust	1-0	Pakistan Police
Zafar Majeed 17'

PMC Ground, Faisalabad
15 April 2011
16:00 (UTC+5)

Pakistan Television	0-1	Pakistan Airlines
		Lashari 26'

University of Agriculture Ground, Faisalabad
17 April 2011
16:00 (UTC+5)

Pakistan Police	1-2	Pakistan Airlines
Sher Hassan 71' (pen.)		Saddam 54'; Nazir 75'

Bohramwali Ground, Faisalabad
Referee: Ahmed Ali
17 April 2011
16:00 (UTC+5)

Karachi Port Trust	1-0	Pakistan Television
Zafar Majeed 89'

Bohramwali Ground, Faisalabad
Referee: M. Iqbal Jr
19 April 2011
16:00 (UTC+5)

Karachi Port Trust	0-2	Pakistan Airlines
		Abdul Qadir 41'; Lashari 46'

Bohramwali Ground, Faisalabad
Referee: M. Iqbal Jr
19 April 2011
16:00 (UTC+5)

Pakistan Television	3-3	Pakistan Police
M. Ali 8'; Salah Uddin 42'; Niamatullah 79'		Rasheed 38'; Nasibullah 54'; Sanaullah 58'

Bohramwali Ground, Faisalabad
Referee: M. Iqbal Jr

=== Group D ===
Pos	Team	Pld	W	D	L	GF	GA	GD	Pts	Qualification
1	Karachi Electric Supply Corporation	3	2	1	0	7	4	+3	7	Advance to Knockout round
2	Pakistan Army	3	2	1	0	2	0	+2	7	Advance to Knockout round
3	Pakistan Railways	3	1	0	2	5	6	−1	3	
4	PMC Athletico	3	0	0	3	2	6	−4	0	

Updated to match(es) played on 21 April 2011. Source:
16 April 2011
16:00 (UTC+5)

PMC Athletico	1-3	Karachi Electric Supply Corporation
Usman 43'		Rasool 27', 29'; Muhammad 54'

PMC Ground, Faisalabad
Referee: Ahmed Ali
16 April 2011
16:00 (UTC+5)

Pakistan Army	1-0	Pakistan Railways
Safeer 33'

Bohranwali Stadium, Faisalabad
Referee: Ahmed Ali
18 April 2011
16:00 (UTC+5)

Karachi Electric Supply Corporation	4-3	Pakistan Railways
Rasool 10', 71', 77'; M. Riaz 55'		Imran 67'; Waseem Abbass 80'; Usman 86'

University of Agriculture Stadium, Faisalabad
Referee: M. Iqbal Jr.
18 April 2011
16:00 (UTC+5)

PMC Athletico	0-1	Pakistan Army
		Ikram 45'

PMC Ground, Faisalabad
Referee: Ahmed Ali
20 April 2011
16:00 (UTC+5)

Karachi Electric Supply Corporation	0-0	Pakistan Army

University of Agriculture Stadium, Faisalabad
20 April 2011
16:00 (UTC+5)

PMC Athletico	1-2	Pakistan Railways
Alam 43'		Imran 44', 90'

PMC Ground, Faisalabad

== Knockout round ==
=== Quarter finals ===
22 April 2011
16:00 (UTC+5)

Khan Research Laboratories	6-0	Karachi Port Trust
M. Zeeshan 18'; S. Hasnain 22', 30'; Saadullah 54', 66', 90+1'

PMC Ground, Faisalabad
Referee: M. Iqbal Jr.
22 April 2011
16:00 (UTC+5)

Pakistan Airlines	3-0	Pakistan Airforce
Lashari 41', 87'; A. Jabbar 89'

Bohranwali Ground, Faisalabad
Referee: Naveed Butt
22 April 2011
16:00 (UTC+5)

Ashraf Sugar Mills	0-2	Pakistan Army
		Jaffer 16' (pen.); Ikram 59'

Bohranwali Ground, Faisalabad
Referee: Ahmed Ali
22 April 2011
16:00 (UTC+5)

Karachi Electric Supply Corporation	2-0	WAPDA
Muhammad bin Yousuf 34'; Essa 74'

Bohranwali Ground, Faisalabad
Referee: Ahmed Ali

=== Semi-finals ===
25 April 2011
16:00 (UTC+5)

Khan Research Laboratories	1-1 (a.e.t.)	Pakistan Army
Hussain Abbas 48'		Ikram 30'
Penalties
	4–2

Bohranwali Ground, Faisalabad
Referee: Jehangir Khan
25 April 2011
16:00 (UTC+5)

Karachi Electric Supply Corporation	1-1 (a.e.t.)	Pakistan Airlines
Aurangzeb Shahmir 115'		Nasrullah 109'
Penalties
	4–3

Bohranwali Ground, Faisalabad
Referee: Ahmed Ali

=== Third place ===
24 April 2011
16:00 (UTC+5)

Pakistan Army	3-0	Pakistan Airlines
M. Ikram 20'; Shabbir Hussain 22'; Safeer 56'

Bohranwali Ground, Faisalabad
Referee: Ahmed Ali

=== Final ===
25 April 2011
16:00 (UTC+5)

Khan Research Laboratories	1-0	Karachi Electric Supply Corporation
Hassnain Abbas 74'

Bohranwali Ground, Faisalabad
Referee: Ahmed Ali

== Bracket ==
Quarter Final
D1	Karachi Electric Supply Corporation	2
A2	WAPDA	0
C1	Pakistan Airlines	3
B2	Pakistan Airforce	0
A1	Ashraf Sugar Mills	0
D2	Pakistan Army	2
B1	Khan Research Laboratories	6
C2	Karachi Port Trust	0

Semi Final
D1	Karachi Electric Supply Corporation	1 (4)
C1	Pakistan Airlines	1 (3)
B1	Khan Research Laboratories	1 (4)
D1	Pakistan Army	1 (2)

Final
B1	Khan Research Laboratories	1
C1	Karachi Electric Supply Corporation	0

== Top scorers ==
As of 27 April 2011

=== Top scorer ===
Rank	Scorer	Club	Goals
1	Muhammad Rasool	Karachi Electric Supply Corporation	5
2	Saadullah Khan	Khan Research Laboratories	4
2	Shakir Lashari	Pakistan Airlines	4
4	Hassnain Abbas	Khan Research Laboratories	3
4	Imran	Pakistan Railways	3
