= Railways Ground =

Sports venue in Faisalabad, Pakistan

- Location: Faisalabad, Pakistan
- Capacity: 2,000

Railways Ground is a multi-use stadium in Faisalabad, Pakistan. It is primarily used for hosting football matches. The stadium holds 2,000 spectators.
