= Shaheen Shah Afridi =

Pakistani cricketer (born 2000)

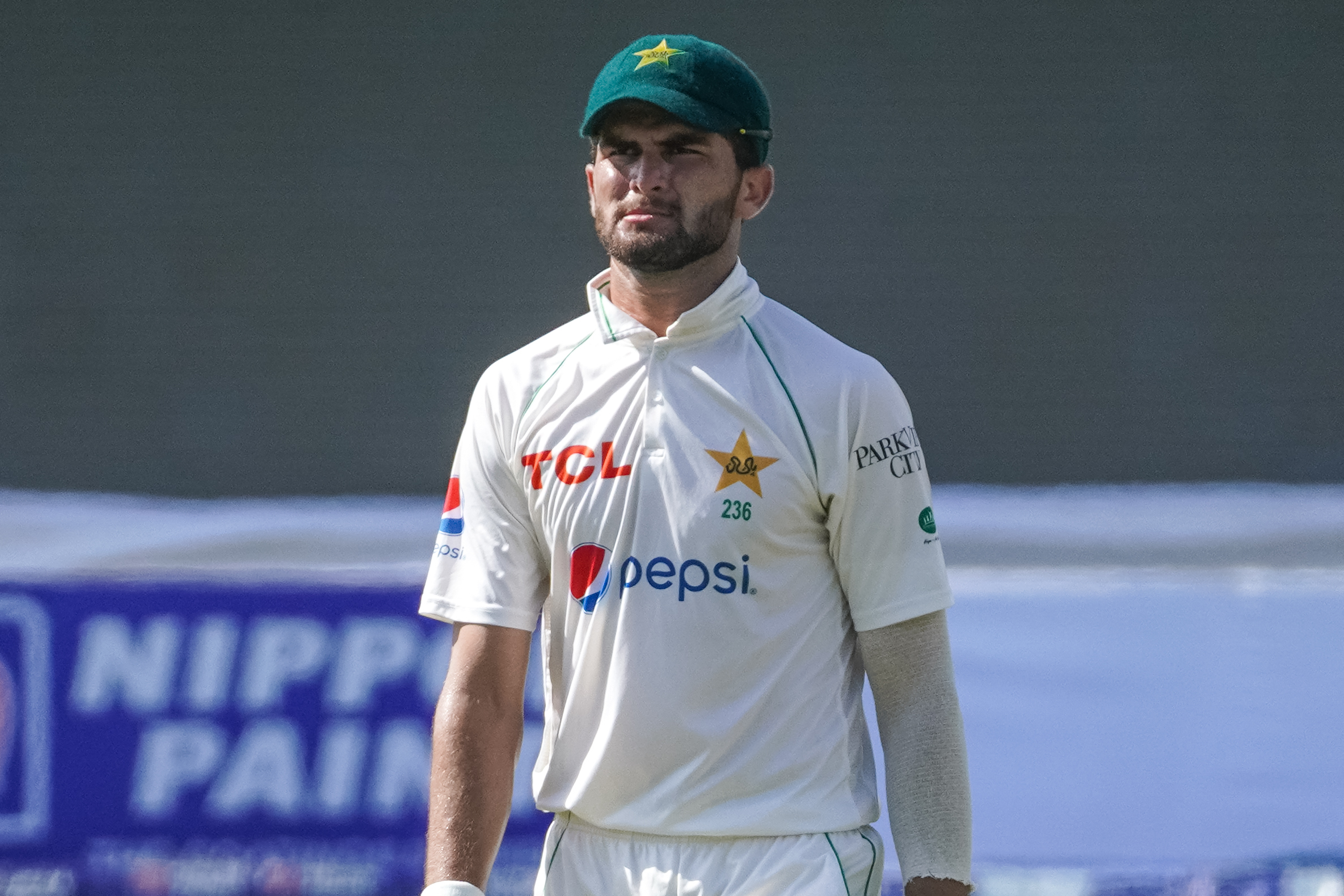
- Afridi in 2023

Personal information
- Born: 6 April 2000 (age 26); Landi Kotal, Khyber Pakhtunkhwa, Pakistan
- Nickname: The Eagle
- Height: 1.98 m (6 ft 6 in)
- Batting: Left-handed
- Bowling: Left-arm fast
- Role: Bowler
- Relatives: Riaz Afridi (brother); Yasir Afridi (cousin); Shahid Afridi (father-in-law)

International information
- National side: Pakistan (2018–present)
- Test debut (cap 236): 3 December 2018 v New Zealand
- Last Test: 20 October 2025 v South Africa
- ODI debut (cap 218): 21 September 2018 v Afghanistan
- Last ODI: 30 May 2026 v Australia
- ODI shirt no.: 10
- T20I debut (cap 78): 3 April 2018 v West Indies
- Last T20I: 28 February 2026 v Sri Lanka
- T20I shirt no.: 10

Domestic team information
- Years: Team
- 2017/18: Khan Research Laboratories
- 2018–present: Lahore Qalandars
- 2018: Balochistan
- 2019/20: Northern
- 2020: Hampshire
- 2020/21–2023: Khyber Pakhtunkhwa
- 2022: Middlesex
- 2023: Nottinghamshire
- 2023: Welsh Fire
- 2024/25: Fortune Barishal
- 2025/26: Brisbane Heat
- 2026-present: Kandy Royals

Career statistics
Competition	Test	ODI	T20I	FC
Matches	34	78	103	43
Runs scored	269	345	345	390
Batting average	7.27	13.80	14.37	8.47
100s/50s	0/0	0/0	0/0	0/0
Top score	29*	37	33*	29*
Balls bowled	6,684	3919	2,223	8,364
Wickets	126	149	136	166
Bowling average	28.13	24.38	21.35	26.81
5 wickets in innings	4	3	0	5
10 wickets in match	1	0	0	1
Best bowling	6/51	6/35	4/22	8/39
Catches/stumpings	3/–	20/–	30/–	6/–
Medal record
Men's cricket
Representing Pakistan
ICC T20 World Cup
Runner-up	2022 Australia
ACC Asia Cup
Runner-up	2025 UAE
- Source: ESPNcricinfo, 18 October 2026

Shaheen Shah Afridi (Note: Pashto: شاهین شاه اپریدی, pronounced [ʃɑhin 'ʃɑh əpridi]; Urdu: شاہین شاہ آفریدی, pronounced [ʃaːɦiːɳ ʃaːɦ aːfɾiːdiː]) (born 6 April 2000) is a Pakistani international cricketer who represents the Pakistan national team. He is the captain of the national ODI team and previously served as captain of Pakistan T20I team. A left-arm fast bowler, he made his international debut against West Indies in 2018 and was named the ICC Men's Cricketer of the Year in 2021, becoming the first Pakistani cricketer to win the Sir Garfield Sobers Trophy. He led the Lahore Qalandars to Pakistan Super League titles in 2022, 2023, and 2025, becoming the first captain to win three PSL championships.

== Early and personal life ==
Afridi was born on 6 April 2000 in Landi Kotal, Khyber Agency of the Federally Administered Tribal Areas (present-day Khyber District, Khyber Pakhtunkhwa) into a family belonging to the Zakhakhel Afridi tribe of the Pashtuns. He grew up in his hometown of Landi Kotal. He is the youngest of seven brothers; his eldest brother, 15 years his senior, is Riaz Afridi who played a single Test match for Pakistan in 2004. His cousin Yasir Afridi is a professional footballer who has represented the Pakistan national football team.

In March 2021, Afridi became engaged with Ansha Afridi who is daughter of former Pakistan cricketer Shahid Afridi. On 3 February 2023, they married in a private nikah ceremony. On 24 August 2024, their first child was born, a son named Aliyaar Afridi.

In July 2022, Afridi was made an honorary Deputy Superintendent of the Police (DSP) rank in the KP Police as a goodwill ambassador.

In January 2023, it was announced that Afridi would design Lahore Qalandars' new kits for the 2023 PSL.

== Youth career ==
Shaheen began his cricket career from the Tatara Ground in Landi Kotal, which is named after the nearby Tatara Hills. Riaz Afridi introduced Shaheen to hard-ball cricket at the FATA Under-16 trials in 2015, with Shaheen having played only tennis-ball cricket until then. Success at this level led to Shaheen being selected for the Under-16 tour of Australia in November 2015, where he played his part with four wickets in the 2–1 victories in the One-Day and Twenty20 series.

In December 2016, Afridi was included in the Pakistan Under-19 cricket team selected for the 2016 Under-19 Asia Cup held in Sri Lanka. He took 3 wickets for 27 runs in Pakistan's nine-wickets victory over Singapore in their opening match of the U-19 Asia Cup.

== Domestic and franchise career ==
In early September 2017, Afridi signed a two-year contract with Dhaka Dynamites, a major Bangladesh Premier League franchise. Later he made his first-class debut for Khan Research Laboratories in the 2017–18 Quaid-e-Azam Trophy on 26 September 2017. In the second innings of the match, he took 8 wickets for 39 runs, the best figures by a Pakistani bowler on first-class debut.

In December 2017, Afridi was named in Pakistan's squad for the 2018 Under-19 Cricket World Cup. He was the leading wicket-taker for Pakistan in the tournament, with 12 wickets. Following Pakistan's matches in the tournament, the International Cricket Council (ICC) named Afridi as the rising star of the squad.

Afridi made his Twenty20 debut for Lahore Qalandars in the 2018 Pakistan Super League (PSL) on 23 February 2018. The following month in the PSL, during Lahore's match with the Multan Sultans, Afridi took five wickets for four runs. Lahore won the fixture by 6 wickets and Afridi was named the player of the match.

In April 2018, Afridi was named in Baluchistan's squad for the 2018 Pakistan Cup. He made his List A debut for Baluchistan on 25 April 2018.

In July 2019, Afridi was selected to play for the Rotterdam Rhinos in the inaugural edition of the Euro T20 Slam cricket tournament. However, the following month the tournament was cancelled.

In December 2019, it was announced that Afridi will play for Hampshire County Cricket Club in the 2020 T20 Blast in England. In September 2020, Hampshire confirmed his participation in the 2020 T20 Blast, and announced that he will be available after fulfilling his national duties.

On 20 September 2020, in the final round of group matches in the T20 Blast, Afridi took a hat-trick and four wickets in four balls, finishing with match figures of 6/19 from his four overs and recording the best ever bowling figures at the Rose Bowl in T20 cricket.

On 2 October 2020, in the 2020–21 National T20 Cup, Afridi took his second five-wicket haul in three T20 games, with figures of 5/20 from his four overs. Three days later, Afridi took another five-wicket haul, with 5/21 in the match against Sindh. In October 2021, Afridi signed with Middlesex to play in domestic matches in England until July 2022. However, he returned to Pakistan in mid-May to prepare for the national team's home series against the West Indies.

In December 2021, he was named as the captain of Lahore Qalandars. Afridi later stated that Imran Khan had suggested for him to become captain, which led to the change in captaincy. Under his captaincy, Qalandars won the 2022 PSL, which made him the youngest captain to win a T20 league. He also ended the tournament as the leading wicket-taker.

In December 2024, he was directly signed by the defending Bangladesh Premier League Champion, Fortune Barishal, making his debut for them on the 30th of December.

In June 2025, Afridi nominated for the Big Bash League (BBL) international player draft for the 2025–26 season. He was selected first overall by the Brisbane Heat.

== International career ==
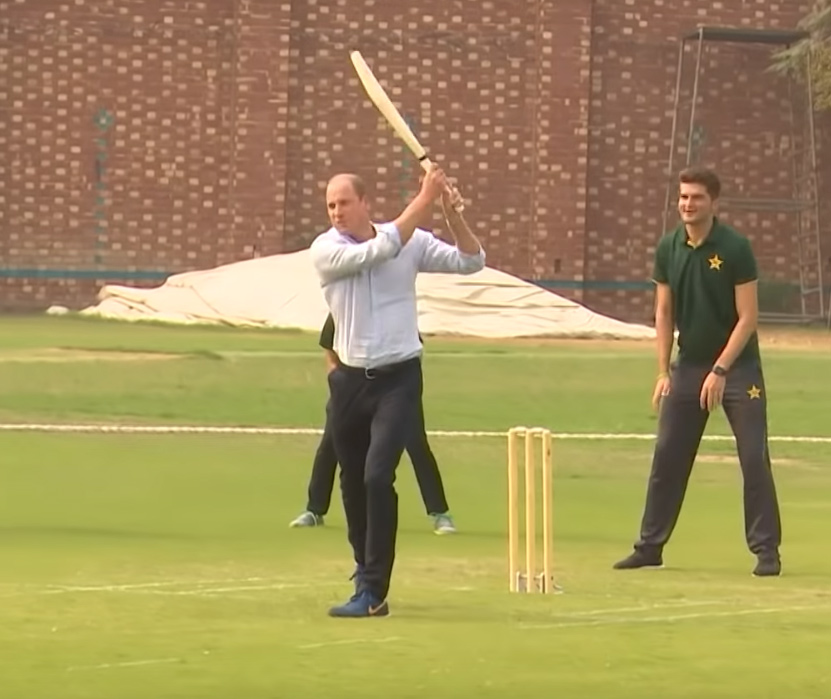
Afridi (behind the stumps) and Prince William playing tapeball cricket in Lahore, in 2019

In March 2018, he was named in Pakistan's Twenty20 International (T20I) squad for their series against the West Indies. He made his T20I debut for Pakistan against the West Indies on 3 April 2018. In September 2018, he was named in Pakistan's One Day International (ODI) squad for the 2018 Asia Cup. He made his ODI debut for Pakistan against Afghanistan on 21 September 2018.

His rapid rise to international cricket was noted, as despite having played only three first-class matches, he was already being discussed as a strong candidate for Test selection. His early career trajectory was also compared to that of Wasim Akram, observing that while both debuted with limited domestic experience, Afridi was being introduced to the highest level far more gradually and systematically, with his pace, height, left-arm angle, and control as defining attributes. In November 2018, he was named in Pakistan's Test squad for their series against New Zealand. He made his Test debut for Pakistan against New Zealand on 3 December 2018.

In April 2019, he was named in Pakistan's squad for the 2019 Cricket World Cup. On 5 July 2019, in the match against Bangladesh, Shaheen became the youngest bowler to take a five-wicket haul in a World Cup match, finishing with figures of 6/35. These were also the best bowling figures by a bowler for Pakistan in a World Cup match. Following the World Cup, the International Cricket Council (ICC) named Afridi as the rising star of the squad.

In December 2019, during the second Test match against Sri Lanka, Afridi took his first five-wicket haul in Test cricket. In June 2020, he was named in a 29-man squad for Pakistan's tour to England during the COVID-19 pandemic. In July, he was shortlisted in Pakistan's 20-man squad for the Test matches against England. In September 2021, he was named in Pakistan's squad for the 2021 ICC Men's T20 World Cup.

In August 2021, during the second Test of the tour of West Indies, Afridi was declared Player of the Match as he took 10 for 94, the best match figures by a Pakistan fast bowler since Mohammad Asif in 2006, and only the fourth instance of a Pakistan quick taking ten wickets in a Test in the 21st century. Observers highlighted Afridi's sustained pace, reverse swing, and ability to strike with both the new and old ball, noting that his efforts helped Pakistan level the series and extend their record of not losing a multi-match bilateral Test series to the West Indies since 2000.

In December 2021, Afridi entered the top five of the ICC Test bowling rankings for the first time in his career. It was noted that Afridi's ascent reflected both his wicket-taking consistency and his impact as Pakistan's premier strike bowler, making him the youngest fast bowler in the world at that time to occupy a top-five position in the Test rankings. In January 2022, Afridi was named the Cricketer of the Year by the International Cricket Council. He took 78 wickets in 36 international matches in 2021.

In October 2023, he took a 5 wicket haul against Australia in the 2023 Cricket World Cup match. He finished the 2023 Cricket World Cup with the sixth most wickets, taking 18 wickets in 9 matches. On 31 October, he became the fastest Pakistani bowler to get 100 wickets in ODIs, as well as the fastest pacer to do so. He achieved the feat in 51 matches, overtaking Saqlain Mushtaq, who took 53 matches to complete 100 wickets. However, analysts noted a dip in Afridi's trademark new-ball effectiveness in ODIs. Analysts argued that Afridi's opening bursts, once defined by prodigious swing and early wickets, had begun to wear thin, with batters increasingly prepared for his inswinging fuller length. It suggested that Afridi might have been over-striving for the perfect, wicket-taking delivery, reducing his variation and predictability in the powerplay.

In November 2023, Afridi rose to the top of the ICC ODI bowling rankings for the first time in his career. Afridi climbed seven places after a strong start to the 2023 ODI World Cup, where a series of impactful new-ball and middle-overs spells significantly boosted his ranking. His ascent made him the first Pakistan fast bowler since the 1990s to reach No. 1 in ODIs. On 15 November 2023, Afridi was appointed as T20I captain after Babar Azam resigned from captaincy in all three formats of the game.

In May 2024, he was named in Pakistan's squad for the 2024 ICC Men's T20 World Cup tournament. In December 2024, he completed 100 T20Is wickets against South Africa, becoming only the third Pakistani to reach the mark, Additionally, he was the first Pakistani to reach 100 wickets in all three formats of international cricket, and the youngest bowler to do so. Afridi also became the youngest ever to achieve 100 wickets in all-format of cricket history.

In November 2024, Afridi returned to the top of the ICC ODI bowling rankings, reclaiming the No. 1 position. The update followed a series of strong white-ball performances that lifted him back above his competitors in the global standings.

During the 2025 Asia Cup, Afridi took 10 wickets in seven matches, finishing as one of Pakistan's leading bowlers in the competition. In a Super Four match against Bangladesh, he recorded figures of 3 for 17 and added useful 29 runs, helping Pakistan recover from a top-order collapse. His contributions with both ball and bat were noted as adding depth to the team's overall performance.

In October 2025, during the first Test of the home series against South Africa, which Pakistan won by 93 runs, Afridi was decisive with the old ball, exploiting reverse swing to claim four wickets in the final innings, a haul greater than all Pakistani pace bowlers had managed collectively across the previous four home Tests. On 20 October 2025, Afridi was appointed as ODI captain of Pakistan team. In the third and last T20I of the home series against South Africa, which Pakistan won, Afridi was noted for his new ball spell, taking 3/26, including two wickets in the first over, reducing South Africa to 22 in the powerplay, their third-lowest in T20I history. As captain, Afridi led Pakistan to a landmark victory in the ODI series, becoming the first Pakistan skipper to win an ODI series at home against the Proteas. He chose to field first in the decider, and his strategic decisions and leadership under pressure were pivotal in the triumph.

== Awards and recognition ==
- PCB's Impactful performance of the year: 2021
- ICC Men's cricketer of the Year, 2021.

Preceded by Babar Azam	Pakistani national cricket captain (T20I); 2023–2024	Succeeded by Babar Azam

Awards
Preceded by Ben Stokes	Sir Garfield Sobers Trophy; 2021	Succeeded by Babar Azam
