= Muhammad Shahid (footballer) =

Pakistani footballer

Personal information
- Full name: Muhammad Naeem Shahid
- Date of birth: 10 November 1984 (age 41)
- Place of birth: Bahawalpur, Pakistan
- Height: 1.73 m (5 ft 8 in)
- Position: Right-back

Youth career
- 1994–2002: Sutlej Club

Senior career*
Years	Team	Apps	(Gls)
2002–2010	WAPDA		
2007	Lahore Lajpaals		
2010–2021	Khan Research Laboratories		

International career
2003–2006	Pakistan U23		
2003–2009	Pakistan	18	(0)
Medal record
Representing Pakistan
Winner	South Asian Games	2006
- * Club domestic league appearances and goals

Muhammad Naeem Shahid (Urdu: محمد شاہد; born 10 November 1984), is a Pakistani former footballer who played as a right-back.

== Club career ==
=== Early career ===
Shahid started his youth career at Sutlej Club in Bahawalpur in 1994. His father also played in the same club earlier. He later represented the district and division Bahawalpur team, and was selected for the Punjab provincial team. He also participated in the National Youth ChampionshipNational Youth Football Championship.

=== WAPDA ===
Shahid won the Pakistan Premier League for five times with WAPDA in 2004–05, 2007–08 and 2008–09.

=== Khan Research Laboratories ===
He moved to Khan Research Laboratories in 2010, winning the 2011–12, 2012–13 and 2013–14 Pakistan Premier League. He also won National Football Challenge Cup four three with Khan Research Laboratories, winning the domestic cup in 2010, 2011, 2012, 2015 and 2016. He was a member of the team which reached the 2013 AFC President's Cup final, after falling to Turkmen club Balkan FT by 0–1 in the final.

In the 2018–19 Pakistan Premier League season, Shahid's stoppage time goal on penalty enabled leaders Khan Research Laboratories to beat Muslim FC by 2–1 at the Korangi Baloch Football Stadium. The match was marred by a crowd of Muslim FC’s supporters trying to attack the referee after the final whistle for sending off one of their players in the second half. The victory enabled KRL to take their points tally to 32 from 15 matches, above the second-placed Pakistan Air Force, until eventually winning the league title again at the end of the season.

== International career ==
In 2003. Shahid represented the Pakistan under 23 national team at the 2004 Summer Olympics qualifiers.

He earned his first senior international cap in 2003 during the 2004 AFC Asian Cup qualifiers against Singapore. He was subsequently called for the 2006 FIFA World Cup qualification the same year against Kyrgyzstan. Shahid was also called by the Pakistan under 23 national team for the 2006 South Asian Games held in Colombo, where he helped Pakistan win the gold medal.

After several friendlies against India, Kyrgyzstan, Tajikistan, Macau and Nepal, he participated in the 2008 and 2010 AFC Challenge Cup qualification. He was also called up for the 2009 SAFF Championship.

== Career statistics ==
=== International ===
Appearances and goals by year and competition
National team	Year	Apps	Goals
Pakistan	2003	3	0
Pakistan	2005	2	0
Pakistan	2006	3	0
Pakistan	2008	4	0
Pakistan	2009	6	0
Total		18	0

== Honours ==
=== Club ===
==== WAPDA ====
- Pakistan Premier League: 2004–05, 2007–08, 2008–09

==== Khan Research Laboratories ====
- Pakistan Premier League: 2011–12, 2012–13, 2013–14, 2018–19
- National Football Challenge Cup: 2010, 2011, 2012, 2015, 2016

=== International ===
==== Pakistan U23 ====
- South Asian Games: 2006
