= Rajab Ali (footballer) =

Pakistani footballer

Personal information
- Full name: Rajab Ali Hazara
- Date of birth: 6 March 1997 (age 29)
- Place of birth: Quetta, Pakistan
- Height: 1.75 m (5 ft 9 in)
- Position: Midfielder

Senior career*
Years	Team	Apps	(Gls)
2013–2015	Pak Hazara FC		
2016	Pakistan Police		
2016–2026	Khan Research Laboratories		

International career^{‡}
2013–2014	Pakistan U17		
2023–	Pakistan	2	(0)
- * Club domestic league appearances and goals as of 18:00, 14 October 2023 (UTC) ‡ National team caps and goals as of 18:00, 17 November 2023 (UTC)

Rajab Ali (born 6 March 1997) is a Pakistani footballer who plays as a midfielder. He last played for Khan Research Laboratories. He has represented the Pakistan national team. Ali is also a member of the Pakistan national futsal team, playing with the team at the 2026 SAFF Futsal Championship.

== Early life ==
Belonging to the ethnic Hazara community, Rajab was born in Quetta in the Balochistan province of Pakistan. At the age of 10, Rajab started to pursue his football aspirations. Initially, his family hoped to prioritize his studies, but Ali remained dedicated to football despite the scarcity of resources for the sport.

== Club career ==
=== Early career ===
Ali started his football career following an announcement about an under-13 tournament and made it into the Balochistan under-13 football team. He continued his path by also playing for the under-14 and under-15 teams.

However, when the under-16 championship was scheduled in Mali Bagh in Quetta, Ali's parents expressed concerns about security issues in Balochistan, leading them to hesitate about allowing him to prepare for the championship. Despite the opposition from his family, Ali attended the 10-day training camp, and earned a spot in the Balochistan Championship and subsequently journeyed to Lahore Football House. He was associated with Quetta-based Pak Hazara FC.

=== Pakistan Police ===
In 2016, Ali also played for the Pakistan Police department in the 2016 Pakistan Football Federation Cup. The same year, Ali won the Balochistan cup with District Football Association Quetta, scoring a goal in a 8–2 victory against Jaffarabad DFA.

=== Khan Research Laboratories ===
He joined Pakistan Premier League departmental side Khan Research Laboratories in 2016. He won the 2018–19 season title with the team.

He also played in the 2021–22 season, but the league was cancelled shortly after starting. In September 2021, he netted a goal in a 6–0 victory against Karachi United at the Ibn-e-Qasim Bagh Stadium. He left KRL in June 2026.

== International career ==
Ali was first selected for the Pakistan under-16 team for the 2013 SAFF U-16 Championship held in Nepal. He was subsequently made captain for the 2014 AFC U-16 Championship qualification. Ali also participated in the 2014 edition of the Street Child World Cup held in Brazil.

In December 2018, Ali participated in Pakistan tour to Qatar for test matches as a preparation for the upcoming 2022 FIFA World Cup qualification, however he was dropped for the final squad. He made his senior international debut on 12 October 2023 in the 2026 FIFA World Cup qualifiers against Cambodia, which ended in a 0–0 draw.

== Futsal career ==
Ali represented the Pakistan national futsal team at the 2026 SAFF Futsal Championship.

== Personal life ==
In 2014, Ali opened the Hazara Football Academy, intended as a training academy due to the lack of resources in football.

Initially, the academy only trained men players. In 2020, the academy expanded the training program to women players. It is providing a future for players who play on the streets instead of playing in football stadiums.

== Career statistics ==
=== International ===
As of 17 November 2023

Appearances and goals by national team and year
National team	Year	Apps	Goals
Pakistan	2023	2	0
Total		2	0

== Honours ==
Khan Research Laboratories

- Pakistan Premier League: 2018–19
