= 2012–13 in Pakistani football =

Football in Pakistan
- Season: 2012–13

Men's football
- Premier League: Khan Research Laboratories
- Federation League: Pak Afghan Clearing
- National Challenge Cup: National Bank

Women's football
- National Women Championship: Young Rising Stars

The 2012–13 season was the 64th season of competitive football in Pakistan.

== Changes in the Pakistan Premier League ==
Teams promoted to the 2012–13 Pakistan Premier League:

- Zarai Taraqiati
- Wohaib

Teams relegated from the 2012–13 Pakistan Premier League:

- Pakistan Police
- Pak Elektron

== Internationals ==
=== Men ===
==== International friendlies ====
19 November 2012 Friendly	Singapore	4–0	Pakistan	Jurong West, Singapore
11:45 SST	Kamran 2' (o.g.); Amri 30'; Ishak 77'; Đurić 86'			Stadium: Jurong West Stadium; Attendance: 1,609

9 February 2013 Friendly	Nepal	0–1	Pakistan	Kathmandu, Nepal
		Report	M. Mujahid 56'	Stadium: Dasarath Rangasala Stadium

12 February 2013 Friendly	Maldives	1–1	Pakistan	Malé, Maldives
21:00 MVT	Asadhulla 48'	Report	Hameed Ahmed 90+1'	Stadium: National Football Stadium; Attendance: 7,000

14 February 2013 Friendly	Maldives	3–0	Pakistan	Malé, Maldives
21:00 MVT	Umair 59'; Ashfaq 67', 90'	Report		Stadium: National Football Stadium; Attendance: 7,000

=== Group B ===
Team	Pld	W	D	L	GF	GA	GD	Pts
Kyrgyzstan	3	3	0	0	3	0	+3	9
Tajikistan	3	2	0	1	4	1	+3	6
Pakistan	3	1	0	2	2	2	0	3
Macau	3	0	0	3	0	6	−6	0

Source: RSSSF

17 March 2013 Group stages	Tajikistan	1–0	Pakistan	Bishkek, Kyrgyzstan
12:00 UTC+6	Makhmudov 89'	Report		Stadium: Spartak Stadium; Attendance: 400; Referee: Masoud Tufayelieh (Syria)

19 March 2013 Group stages	Pakistan	0–1	Kyrgyzstan	Bishkek, Kyrgyzstan
16:00 UTC+6		Report	Tetteh 1'	Stadium: Spartak Stadium; Attendance: 12,000; Referee: Ammar Al-Jeneibi (UAE)

21 March 2013 Group stages	Pakistan	2–0	Macau	Bishkek, Kyrgyzstan
12:00 UTC+6	Bashir 44' (pen.); Kalim Ullah 70'	Report		Stadium: Spartak Stadium; Attendance: 800; Referee: Jameel Abdulhusin (Bahrain)

== League ==
=== Pakistan Premier League ===
Pos	Team	Pld	W	D	L	GF	GA	GD	Pts	Qualification or relegation
1	Khan Research Laboratories (C)	30	21	8	1	65	15	+50	71	Qualification for 2013 AFC President's Cup group stage
2	Karachi Electric Supply Corporation	30	18	8	4	60	27	+33	62	
3	Muslim	30	18	8	4	47	22	+25	62	
4	Pakistan Army	30	17	7	6	36	14	+22	58	
5	Pakistan Air Force	30	15	8	7	46	27	+19	53	
6	National Bank	30	11	11	8	34	26	+8	44	
7	Pakistan Navy	30	9	10	11	31	32	−1	37	
8	Pakistan Airlines	30	8	12	10	28	27	+1	36	
9	Afghan Chaman	30	10	5	15	28	38	−10	35	
10	Baloch Nushki	30	8	10	12	28	37	−9	34	
11	WAPDA	30	7	11	12	36	44	−8	32	
12	Karachi Port Trust	30	8	8	14	34	44	−10	32	
13	Habib Bank	30	7	11	12	28	38	−10	32	
14	Zarai Taraqiati	30	6	9	15	22	29	−7	27	
15	PMC Club Athletico Faisalabad (R)	30	4	13	13	19	45	−26	25	Relegation to 2013–14 Pakistan Football Federation League
16	Wohaib (R)	30	1	5	24	8	75	−67	8	Relegation to 2013–14 Pakistan Football Federation League

Updated to match(es) played on 15 January 2013. Source: RSSSF.com
Rules for classification: 1) points; 2) head-to-head points; 3) goal difference; 4) number of goals scored; 5) taking lots
(C) Champions; (R) Relegated

== National Football Challenge Cup ==
26 May 2013
19:00 PST

National Bank	1–0	Karachi Electric Supply Corporation
M. Asif 81'

Ground No. 1 Dring Stadium, Bahawalpur
Referee: Irshad-ul-Haq (Sheikhupura DFA)
