= Muhammad Ikram =

Pakistani footballer

Muhammed Ikram
Personal information
- Full name: Muhammed Ikram
- Date of birth: 8 January 1988 (age 38)
- Place of birth: Faisalabad, Pakistan
- Position: Striker

Senior career*
Years	Team	Apps	(Gls)
2011–2016	Pakistan Army		

International career
2011	Pakistan	2	(0)
- * Club domestic league appearances and goals

Muhammed Ikram (born 1 January 1988) is a Pakistani former footballer, who played as a striker for Pakistan Army during his five year career.

== International career ==
Ikram earned his first international cap in 2011 against Bangladesh during the 2014 FIFA World Cup qualifiers. He made his international debut in a 3–0 loss to Bangladesh in Dhaka, coming on as a half-time substitute for Kaleemullah Khan. His second and last international appearance was in the second leg against Bangladesh in Lahore, he came on as a 68th minute substitute for Muhammad Rasool, he was booked at 74th minute of the game.
