= Ayaz Butt =

Pakistani footballer and manager

Personal information
- Full name: Muhammad Ayaz Butt
- Date of birth: 27 September 1957 (age 69)
- Place of birth: Pakistan
- Position: Defender

International career
Years	Team	Apps	(Gls)
1982	Pakistan	1	(0)

Managerial career
- 2006–: Khan Research Laboratories (team manager)
- 2019: Pakistan (team manager)

Muhammad Ayaz Butt (Urdu: محمد ایاز بٹ; born 27 September 1957), is a Pakistani former footballer who played as a defender and manager. Butt represented the Pakistan national football team at the 1982 Quaid-e-Azam International Tournament, and served as team manager of Khan Research Laboratories.

== Playing career ==
Butt played as a defender. He represented the Pakistan national football team at the 1982 Quaid-e-Azam International Tournament.

== Managerial career ==
Butt joined Khan Research Laboratories football setup as team manager in 2006. He also served as Principal Scientific Officer of the department. Butt subsequently oversaw the club's rise to domestic dominance, including five Pakistan Premier League titles and six National Challenge Cups, and a stunt to the 2013 AFC President's Cup final, the first time a Pakistani club reached an Asian club final round.

In December 2019 he was named Pakistan national team manager for a friendly tour to Malaysia.

== Career statistics ==
=== International ===
Appearances and goals by national team and year
National team	Year	Apps	Goals
Pakistan	1982	1	0
Total		1	0
