= Waqar Baloch =

Pakistani footballer (born 1996)

Personal information
- Full name: Waqar Ehtisham
- Date of birth: 2 March 1996 (age 30)
- Place of birth: Faisalabad, Pakistan
- Position: Centre-back

Team information
- Current team: Khan Research Laboratories

Senior career*
Years	Team	Apps	(Gls)
2017–2018	Sui Southern Gas		
2018–	Khan Research Laboratories		
2026	→ Hoandedhdhoo FC (loan)		

International career^{‡}
2024–	Pakistan	6	(0)
- * Club domestic league appearances and goals as of 11:13, 21 June 2026 (UTC) ‡ National team caps and goals as of 23:00, 31 March 2026 (UTC)

Waqar Ehtisham (born 2 March 1996), commonly known as Waqar Baloch is a Pakistani footballer who plays as centre-back for Khan Research Laboratories and the Pakistan national team.

== Club career ==
=== Sui Southern Gas ===
Baloch started playing for Pakistan Premier League departmental side Sui Southern Gas in 2017.

=== Khan Research Laboratories ===
Baloch subsequently moved to Khan Research Laboratories. In the 2018–19 season he made 21 appearances scoring a goal, helping the side clinch the league title.

In the 2021–22 season, he made 10 appearances scoring two goals until the league was cancelled shortly after starting. In September 2021, he netted a goal in a 6–0 victory against Karachi United at the Ibn-e-Qasim Bagh Stadium.

== International career ==
Baloch was first called for the 2018 Asian Games preparation camp by coach Jose Antonio Nogueira, however he was unable to secure a spot in the final squad. He was called again the next year for the 2019 Asian Games training camp under head coach Tariq Lutfi, although Pakistan ultimately not participated in the competition.

In January 2020, Baloch was named in Pakistan's squad for a two-match friendly tour in Malaysia.

In August 2022, Baloch was called up for trials with the Pakistan senior national team for a friendly against Nepal, for their first fixture in nearly three-and-a-half years because of the Pakistan Football Federation's suspension by FIFA, but failed to make it to the final squad. He made his senior international debut on 6 June 2024 as a substitute in the second half against Saudi Arabia in their 0–3 home defeat at the 2026 World Cup qualification.

== Career statistics ==
=== International ===
As of 31 March 2026

Appearances and goals by national team and year
National team	Year	Apps	Goals
Pakistan	2024	2	0
Pakistan	2025	3	0
Pakistan	2026	1	0
Total		6	0

== Honours ==
Khan Research Laboratories

- Pakistan Premier League: 2018–19
