= Hassnain Abbas =

Pakistani footballer

Personal information
- Full name: Hassnain Abbas
- Date of birth: 15 October 1990 (age 36)
- Place of birth: Faisalabad, Pakistan
- Position: Midfielder

Team information
- Current team: Lyallpur
- Number: 10

Senior career*
Years	Team	Apps	(Gls)
2011–2013	Khan Research Laboratories		
2013–2021	WAPDA	61	(5)
2021–	Lyallpur	12	(3)

International career^{‡}
2011–2014	Pakistan	5	(0)
- * Club domestic league appearances and goals as of January 13, 2022 ‡ National team caps and goals as of July 3, 2015

Hassnain Abbas (born 15 October 1990) is a Pakistani footballer who plays as a midfielder for Pakistan Premier League club Lyallpur. He has also been part of the Pakistan national football team.

== Club career ==
=== Khan Research Laboratories ===
Abbas appeared in 2012 AFC President's Cup, while playing for Khan Research Laboratories. He won the 2011–12 Pakistan Premier League with the club.

=== WAPDA ===
In 2013, Abbas signed for WAPDA.

=== Lyallpur ===
In 2021, Abbas moved to Lyallpur FC. He made 12 appearances and scored three goals in the 2021–22 season until the league was cancelled shortly after starting.

== International career ==
In May 2011, Abbas was included in the provisional squad for the 2014 World Cup qualifiers. He made his international debut with Pakistan in 2011 during the 2014 World Cup qualifiers against Bangladesh. He was subsequently called for the 2011 SAFF Championship.

== Career statistics ==
=== International ===
As of 14 October 2014

Appearances and goals by national team and year
National team	Year	Apps	Goals
Pakistan	2011	4	0
Pakistan	2014	1	0
Total		5	0

== Honours ==
- Pakistan Premier League: 2011–12
